= List of trifoliate plants =

This is an incomplete list of plants with trifoliate leaves. Trifoliate leaves (also known as trifoliolate or ternate leaves) are a leaf shape characterized by a leaf divided into three leaflets. Species which are known to be trifoliate are listed here. Genera which are characteristically trifoliate are also listed, with species underneath. Genera which are generally not trifoliate are not listed; only the trifoliate species are. Entries are currently listed in alphabetical order, but in the future it may be desirable to list them by families. It may also be desirable to include common names and references.

== A ==
- Acer cissifolium
- Acer griseum
- Acer mandshuricum
- Acer maximowiczianum
- Acer triflorum
- Adenocarpus spp.
- Aegle marmelos
- Amphicarpaea spp.
- Anagyris spp.
- Anthyllis spp.
- Aphyllodium spp.
- Aquilegia grata
- Aquilegia vulgaris
- Argyrolobium spp.
- Aspalathus spp.

== B ==
- Baptisia spp.
  - Baptisia australis
- Bituminaria spp.
  - Bituminaria bituminosa
- Bolusafra spp.
- Bolusia spp.
- Burtonia spp.
- Butea spp.

== C ==
- Cajanus spp.
- Calopogonium spp.
- Canavalia spp.
- Carmichaelia spp.
- Christia spp.
- Clematis aristata
- Cleome serrulata
- Clitoria spp.
- Collaea spp.
- Cologania spp.
- Crotalaria spp.
- Cyclopia spp.
- Commiphora wightii
- Cyamopsis spp.
- Cytisus spp.
  - Cytisus scoparius

== D ==
- Desmodium spp.
- Derris spp.
- Dicentra cucullaria
- Dichilus spp.
- Dioclea spp.
- Dolichos spp.
- Dorycnium spp.
- Dumasia spp.

== E ==
- Eleiotis spp.
- Eriosema spp.
- Erythrina spp.
- Esenbeckia runyonii

== F ==
- Fagonia spp.
  - Fagonia arabica
  - Fagonia laevis
- Flemingia spp.
- Forsythia
- Fragaria chiloensis

== G ==
- Galactia spp.
- Genista spp.
  - Genista monspessulana
  - Genista stenopetala
- Glycine spp.
- Goodia spp.

== H–K ==
- Helicotropis spp.
- Hymenocarpos spp.
- Hypocalyptus spp.
- Indigofera spp.
- Kennedia spp.

== L ==
- Lablab spp.
- Laburnum
- Lebeckia spp.
- Lespedeza spp.
- Lotononis spp.
- Lotus spp.

== M ==
- Martiodendron spp.
- Medicago spp.
  - Medicago truncatula
- Melicope
- Melilotus spp.
- Menyanthes trifoliata
- Mucuna spp.

== N ==
- Nandina domestica

== O ==
- Ononis spp.
- Otoptera spp.
- Oxalis spp.
  - Oxalis corniculata
  - Oxalis tuberosa

== P ==
- Pachyrhizus spp.
- Parochetus spp.
- Pinellia ternata
- Piptanthus spp.
- Phaseolus spp.
- Poncirus trifoliata
- Potentilla indica
- Pseudopanax
  - colensoi var. ternatus
  - macintyrei
- Psophocarpus spp.
- Pterocarpus santalinus
- Pueraria spp.
  - Pueraria edulis
  - Pueraria lobata
  - Pueraria montana
  - Pueraria phaseoloides
  - Pueraria thompsonii

== R ==
- Ranzania japonica
- Raukaua
  - anomalus (juvenile phase)
  - edgerleyi (juvenile phase)
  - simplex (juvenile phase)
- Rhus integrifolia
- Rhus lancea
- Rhus pyroides
- Rhus trilobata
- Rhynchosia spp.
- Rothia spp.
- Rubus spp.
  - Rubus spectabilis

== S ==
- Sigmoidotropis spp.
- Sumac spp.
- Stylosanthes spp.
- Sweetia spp.

== T ==
- Taverniera spp.
- Teramnus spp.
- Tiarella trifoliata
- Toxicodendron radicans
- Toxicodendron rydbergii
- Triphasia spp.
  - Triphasia trifolia
- Trifolium spp.
  - Trifolium campestre
  - Trifolium hybridum
  - Trifolium incarnatum
  - Trifolium pratense
- Trigonella spp.

== U–Z ==
- Ulex spp.
  - Ulex europaeus
  - Ulex gallii
- Vigna spp.
- Wiborgia spp.
