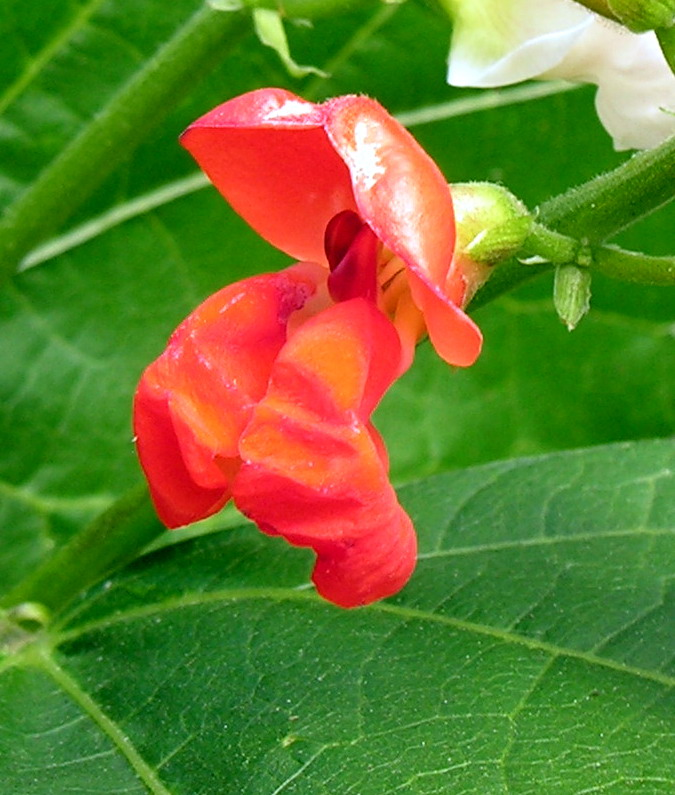
- Phaseolus coccineus

Scientific classification
- Kingdom: Plantae
- Clade: Tracheophytes
- Clade: Angiosperms
- Clade: Eudicots
- Clade: Rosids
- Order: Fabales
- Family: Fabaceae
- Subfamily: Faboideae
- Clade: Meso-Papilionoideae
- Clade: Non-protein amino acid-accumulating clade
- Clade: Millettioids
- Tribe: Phaseoleae; Bronn ex DC. (1825)

Subtribes
- See text

Synonyms
- Phaseolinae Bronn (1822); Erythrineae (Benth.) Hassk. (1844); Glycineae Burnett (1835)

= Phaseoleae =

Tribe of legumes

The plant tribe Phaseoleae is one of the subdivisions of the legume subfamily Faboideae, in the unranked NPAAA clade. This group includes many of the beans cultivated for human and animal food, most importantly from the genera Glycine, Phaseolus, and Vigna.

== Taxonomy ==
Although the tribe as defined in the late 20th century does not appear to be monophyletic, there does seem to be a monophyletic group which roughly corresponds to the tribe Phaseoleae (with some changes). The earlier concept of Phaseoleae is paraphyletic relative to the tribes Abreae and Psoraleeae, plus most of Millettieae and parts of Desmodieae.

The following subtribes and genera are recognized by the USDA:

Cajaninae

- Adenodolichos Harms
- Bolusafra Kuntze
- Cajanus Adans.
- Carrissoa Baker f.
- Chrysoscias E. Mey. (Note: Possibly synonymous with Rhynchosia)
- Dunbaria Wight & Arn.
- Eriosema (DC.) Desv.
- Paracalyx Ali
- Rhynchosia Lour.

Clitoriinae

- Barbieria DC.
- Centrosema (DC.) Benth.
- Clitoria L.
- Clitoriopsis R. Wilczek
- Periandra Mart. ex Benth.

Diocleinae

- Bionia Mart. ex Benth. (Note: Possibly synonymous with Camptosema)
- Camptosema Hook. & Arn.
- Canavalia Adans.
- Cleobulia Mart. ex Benth.
- Collaea DC.
- Cratylia Mart. ex Benth.
- Cymbosema Benth. (Note: Possibly synonymous with Dioclea)
- Dioclea Kunth
- Galactia P. Browne
- Lackeya Fortunato et al. (Note: Possibly synonymous with Galactia)
- Luzonia Elmer
- Macropsychanthus Harms ex K. Schum. & Lauterb.
- Neorudolphia Britton
- Rhodopis Urb.

Glycininae

- Afroamphica H.Ohashi & K.Ohashi
- Amphicarpaea Elliott ex Nutt.
- Calopogonium Desv.
- Cologania Kunth
- Dumasia DC.
- Eminia Taub.
- Glycine Willd.
- Herpyza C. Wright
- Neocollettia Hemsl.
- Neonotonia J. A. Lackey
- Neorautanenia Schinz
- Neustanthus Benth.
- Nogra Merr.
- Pachyrhizus Rich. ex DC.
- Phylacium Benn.
- Pseudeminia Verdc.
- Pseudovigna (Harms) Verdc.
- Pueraria DC.
- Sinodolichos Verdc.
- Teramnus P. Browne
- Teyleria Backer
- Toxicopueraria A.N. Egan & B. Pan bis
- Weizhia G.Y.Li, Z.H.Chen, K.W.Jiang & B.Pan bis

Kennediinae

- Hardenbergia Benth.
- Kennedia Vent.
- Vandasina Rauschert

Ophrestiinae

- Cruddasia Prain
- Ophrestia H. M. L. Forbes
- Pseudoeriosema Hauman

Phaseolinae

- Alistilus N. E. Br.
- Ancistrotropis A. Delgado (Note: American genera formerly part of Vigna)
- Austrodolichos Verdc.
- Cochliasanthus Trew
- Condylostylis Piper
- Dipogon Liebm.
- Dolichopsis Hassl.
- Dolichos L.
- Helicotropis A. Delgado
- Lablab Adans.
- Leptospron (Benth.) A. Delgado
- Macroptilium (Benth.) Urb.
- Macrotyloma (Wight & Arn.) Verdc.
- Mysanthus G. P. Lewis & A. Delgado
- Nesphostylis Verdc.
- Oryxis A. Delgado & G. P. Lewis
- Oxyrhynchus Brandegee
- Phaseolus L.
- Physostigma Balf.
- Ramirezella Rose
- Sigmoidotropis (Piper) A. Delgado
- Spathionema Taub.
- Sphenostylis E. Mey.
- Strophostyles Elliott
- Vatovaea Chiov.
- Vigna Savi
- Wajira Thulin

incertae sedis

- Apios Fabr.
- Butea Roxb. ex Willd.
- Cochlianthus Benth.
- Decorsea R. Vig.
- Diphyllarium Gagnep.
- Dysolobium (Benth.) Prain
- Erythrina L.
- Haymondia A.N. Egan & B. Pan bis (Note: USDA/GRIN places it under Glycininae following Pueraria DC., in conflict with A.N. Egan & B. Pan.)
- Mastersia Benth.
- Meizotropis Voigt (Note: Possibly synonymous with Butea)
- Mucuna Adans.
- Otoptera DC.
- Psophocarpus Neck. ex DC.
- Shuteria Wight & Arn.
- Spatholobus Hassk.
- Strongylodon Vogel

== See also ==
- Helena M. L. Forbes
