= Weizhia =

Scientific classification
- Kingdom: Plantae
- Clade: Tracheophytes
- Clade: Angiosperms
- Clade: Eudicots
- Clade: Rosids
- Order: Fabales
- Family: Fabaceae
- Subfamily: Faboideae
- Clade: Millettioids
- Tribe: Phaseoleae
- Subtribe: Glycininae
- Genus: Weizhia; G.Y.Li, Z.H.Chen, K.W.Jiang & B.Pan bis
- Species: W. pentaphylla

Binomial name
- Weizhia pentaphylla G.Y.Li, Z.H.Chen, K.W.Jiang & B.Pan bis

Genus of flowering plants

Weizhia is a genus of flowering plants in the family Fabaceae. It includes a single species, Weizhia pentaphylla, a climbing perennial native to Zhejiang province in southeastern China.

The genus and species were both described in 2023. Morphological and phylogenetic evidence place the genus in subtribe Glycininae, closely related to the genera Dumasia and Toxicopueraria. Weizhia is distinguished by having usually pinnately 5-foliolate leaves and spurred wing-petals.
