= Eminia =

Eminia is the scientific name for two genera of organisms and may refer to:

- Eminia (bird), a monotypic genus of birds in the family Cisticolidae
- Eminia (plant), a genus of plants in the family Fabaceae
