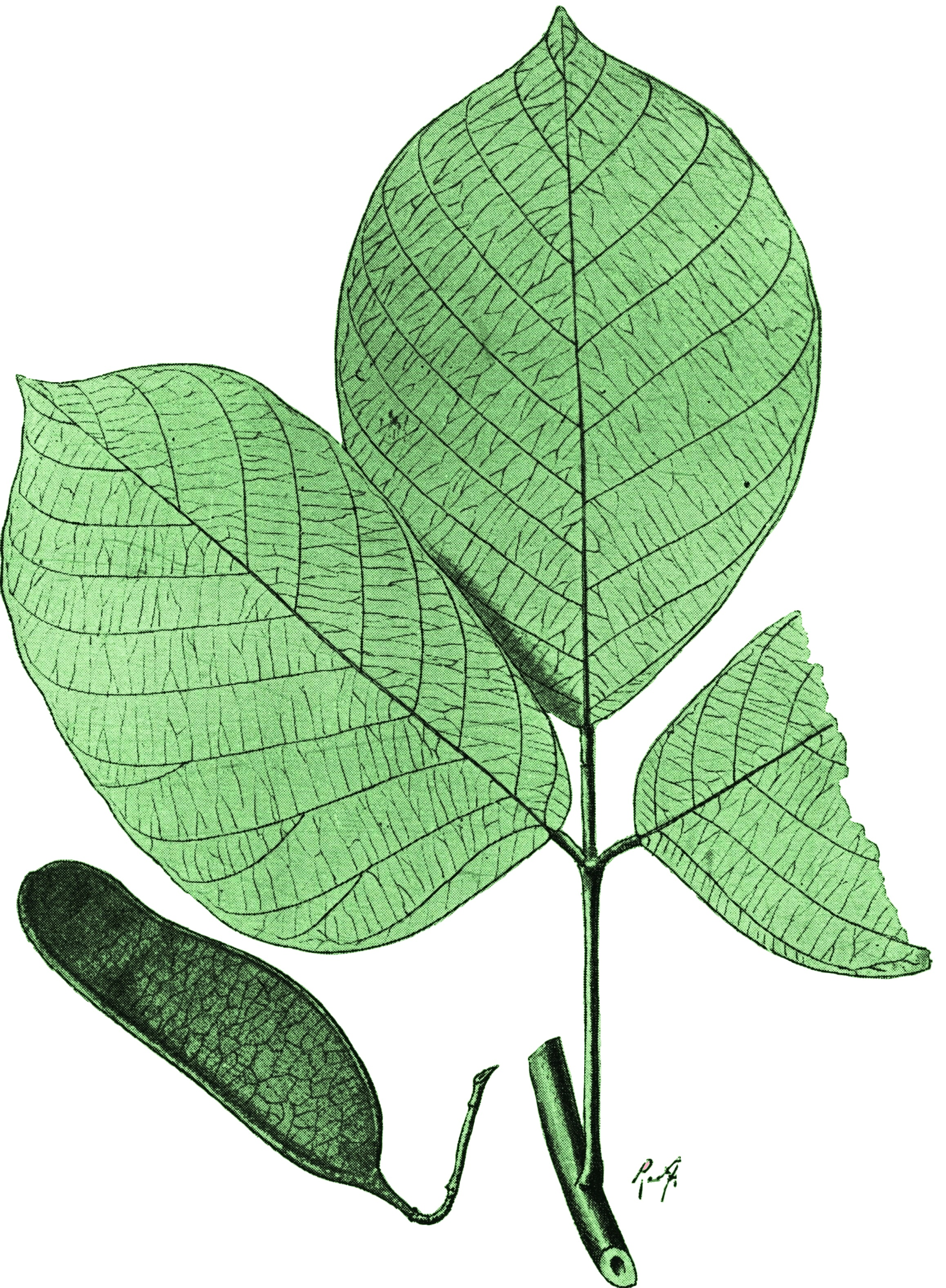
- Spatholobus parviflorus (syn. Spatholobus roxburghii)

Scientific classification
- Kingdom: Plantae
- Clade: Tracheophytes
- Clade: Angiosperms
- Clade: Eudicots
- Clade: Rosids
- Order: Fabales
- Family: Fabaceae
- Subfamily: Faboideae
- Tribe: Phaseoleae
- Genus: Spatholobus; Hassk. (1842)

Species
- 35; see text

Synonyms
- Drebbelia Zoll. & Moritzi (1846)

= Spatholobus =

Genus of legumes

Spatholobus is a genus of flowering plants in the legume family Fabaceae. It includes 35 species of lianas which range from the Indian subcontinent to Indochina, southern China, and western Malesia (Peninsular Malaysia, Sumatra, Java, Borneo, and the Philippines). It grows in seasonally-dry to evergreen tropical forest and thicket, often on rocky slopes and in disturbed areas. It belongs to subfamily Faboideae.

== Species ==
Plants of the World Online includes:

- Spatholobus acuminatus Benth.
- Spatholobus albus Wiriad. & Ridd.-Num.
- Spatholobus apoensis Elmer
- Spatholobus auricomus Ridd.-Num.
- Spatholobus auritus Ridd.-Num.
- Spatholobus biauritus C.F.Wei
- Spatholobus bracteolatus Prain
- Spatholobus crassifolius Benth.
- Spatholobus discolor C.F.Wei
- Spatholobus dubius Prain
- Spatholobus ferrugineus (Zoll. & Moritzi) Benth.
- Spatholobus gengmaensis C.F.Wei
- Spatholobus gyrocarpus Benth.
- Spatholobus harmandii Gagnep.
- Spatholobus hirsutus Wiriad. & Ridd.-Num.
- Spatholobus latibractea Ridd.-Num.
- Spatholobus latistipulus Merr.
- Spatholobus littoralis Hassk.
- Spatholobus macropterus Miq.
- Spatholobus maingayi Prain
- Spatholobus merguensis Prain
- Spatholobus multiflorus Wiriad. & Ridd.-Num.
- Spatholobus oblongifolius Merr.
- Spatholobus parviflorus (Roxb. ex G.Don) Kuntze
- Spatholobus persicinus Ridl.
- Spatholobus pottingeri Prain
- Spatholobus pulcher Dunn
- Spatholobus purpureus Benth. ex Baker
- Spatholobus ridleyi Prain
- Spatholobus sanguineus Elmer
- Spatholobus sinensis Chun & H.Y.Chen
- Spatholobus suberectus Dunn
- Spatholobus uniauritus C.F.Wei
- Spatholobus varians Dunn
- Spatholobus viridis Wiriad. & Ridd.-Num.
