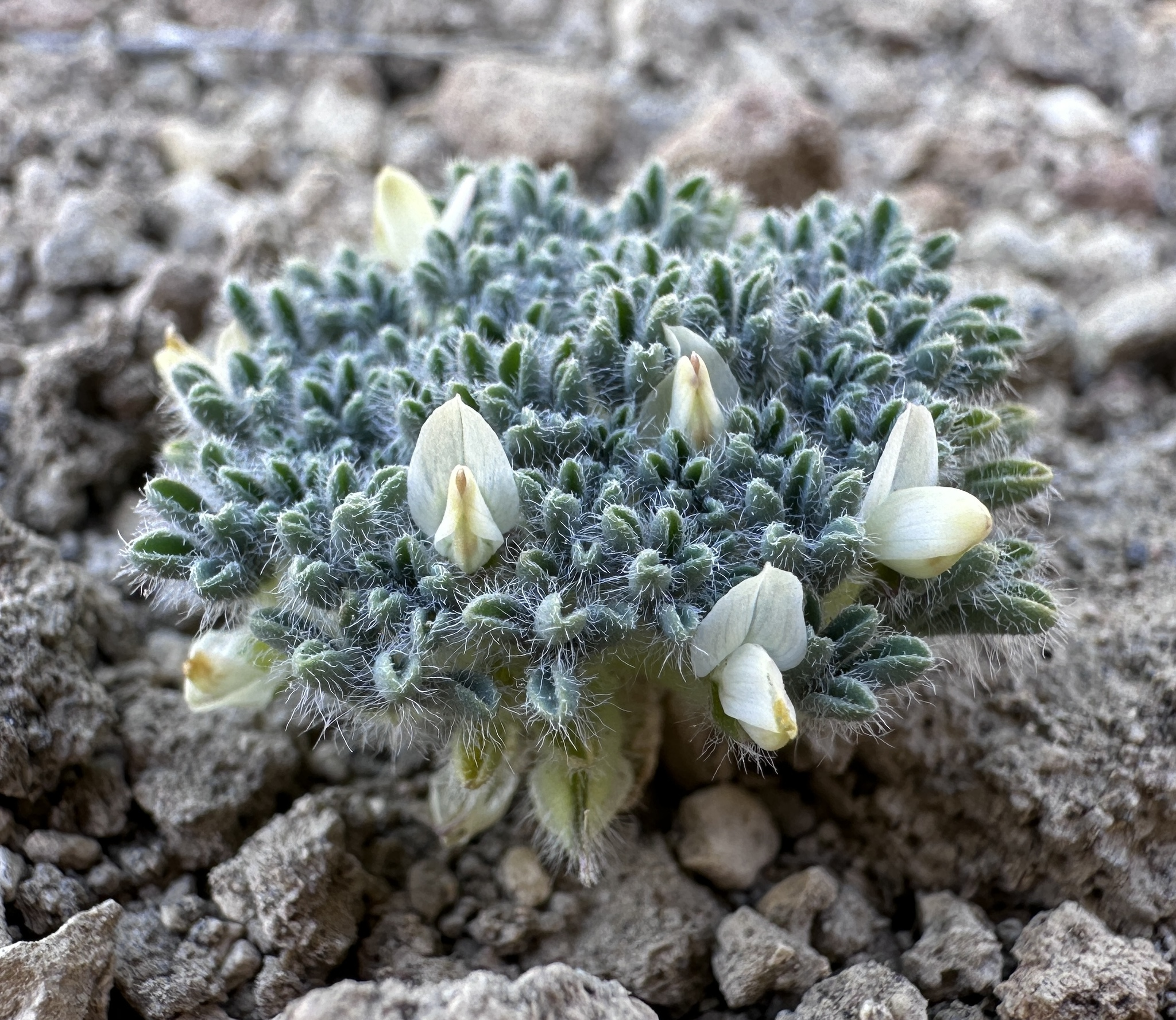
- Lupinus uncialis in Washoe County, Nevada

Scientific classification
- Kingdom: Plantae
- Clade: Tracheophytes
- Clade: Angiosperms
- Clade: Eudicots
- Clade: Rosids
- Order: Fabales
- Family: Fabaceae
- Subfamily: Faboideae
- Genus: Lupinus
- Species: L. uncialis

Binomial name
- Lupinus uncialis S.Watson

= Lupinus uncialis =

Species of flowering plant

Lupinus uncialis is a species of flowering plant in the legume family Fabaceae. It is found in the foothills of the western edge of the Great Basin in eastern California, Nevada, southeastern Oregon and Idaho. It is an annual plant, growing to only 2 cm (0.79 in) when full grown.
