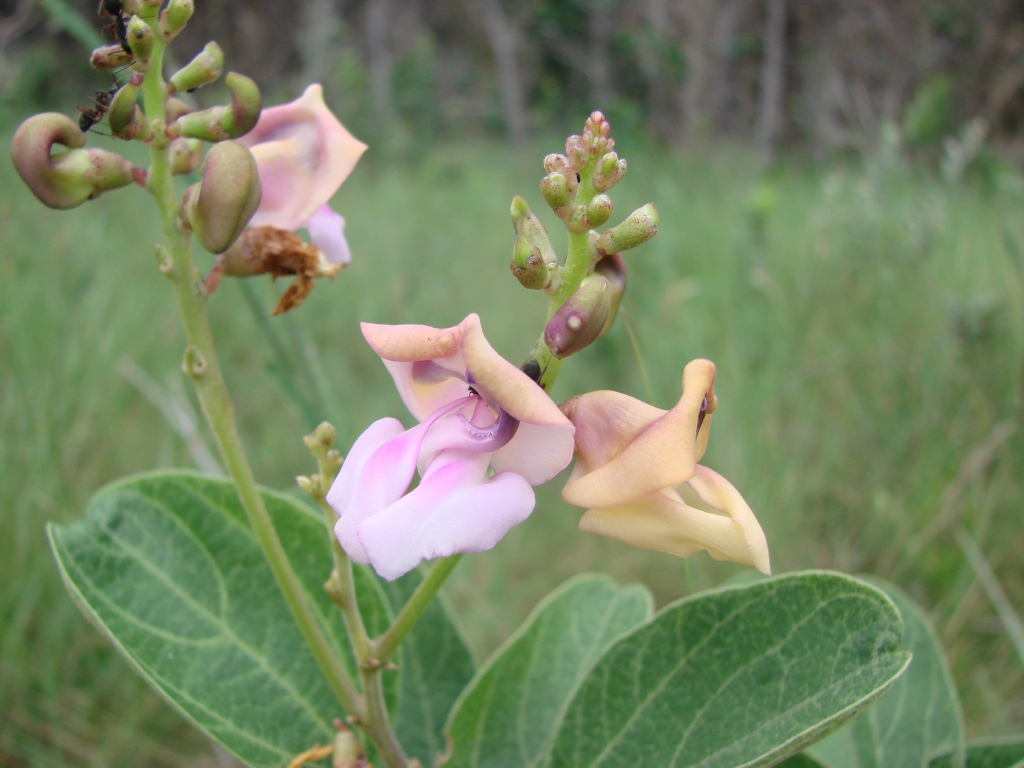
- Ancistrotropis firmula

Scientific classification
- Kingdom: Plantae
- Clade: Tracheophytes
- Clade: Angiosperms
- Clade: Eudicots
- Clade: Rosids
- Order: Fabales
- Family: Fabaceae
- Subfamily: Faboideae
- Subtribe: Phaseolinae
- Genus: Ancistrotropis; A. Delgado, 2011

Type species
- Ancistrotropis peduncularis (Fawcett & Rendle) A. Delgado

Species
- Ancistrotropis firmula (Bentham) A. Delgado; Ancistrotropis peduncularis (Fawcett & Rendle) A. Delgado; Ancistrotropis subhastata (Verdc.) A. Delgado; Ancistrotropis arrabidae (Steud.) A. Delgado; Ancistrotropis clitorioides (Bentham) A. Delgado; Ancistrotropis robusta (Piper) A. Delgado

Synonyms
- Phaseolus ser. Pedunculares Hassl. 1923; Vigna sect. Pedunculares (Hassl.) Maréchal et al. 1978

= Ancistrotropis =

Genus of legumes

Ancistrotropis is a genus of flowering plants in the legume family, Fabaceae. It belongs to the subfamily Faboideae. Species in this genus were formerly considered to belong to the genus Vigna.
