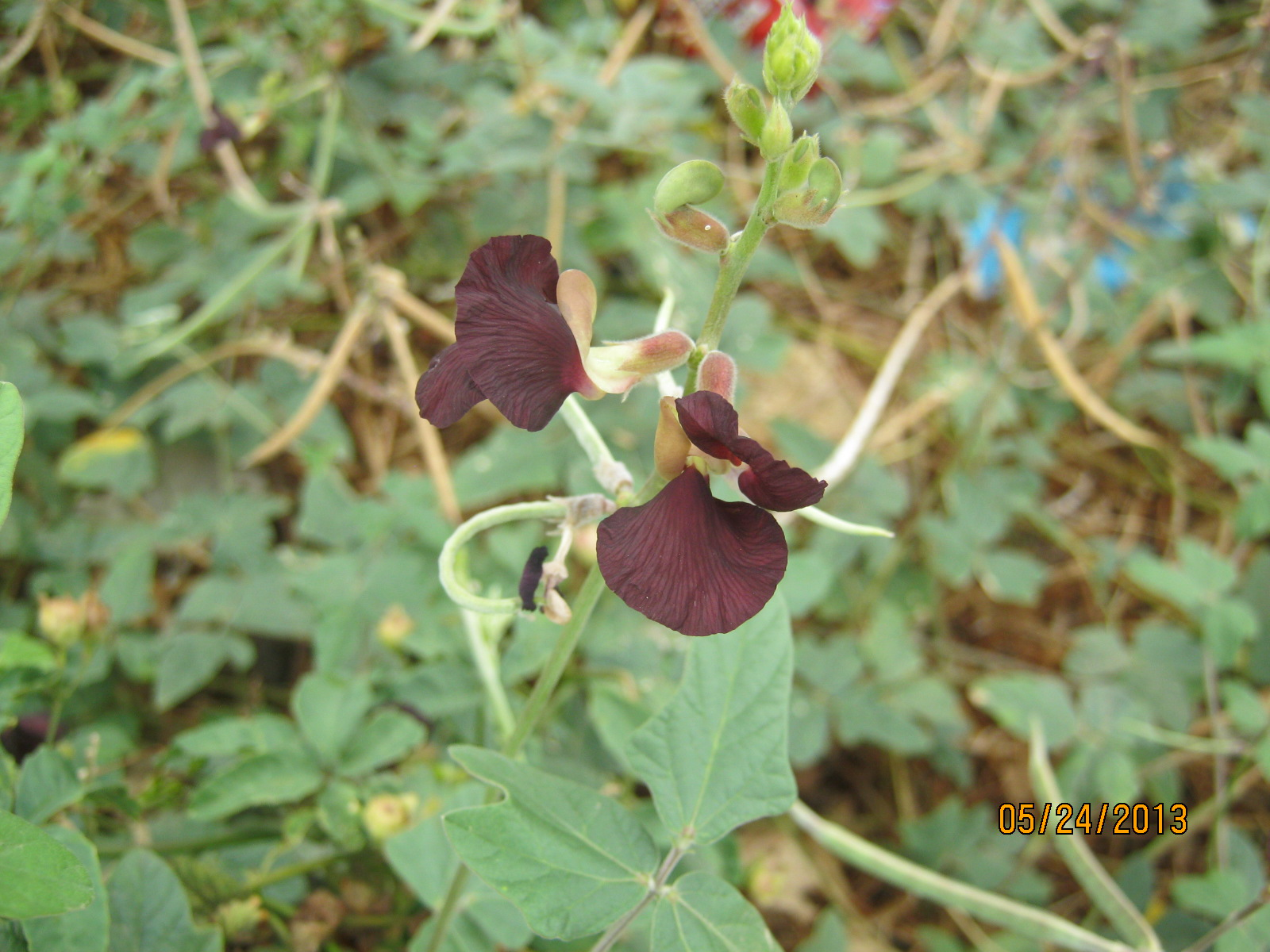
- Ramirezella strobilophora

Scientific classification
- Kingdom: Plantae
- Clade: Tracheophytes
- Clade: Angiosperms
- Clade: Eudicots
- Clade: Rosids
- Order: Fabales
- Family: Fabaceae
- Subfamily: Faboideae
- Subtribe: Phaseolinae
- Genus: Ramirezella; Rose (1903)

Species
- Ramirezella calcoma Ochot.-Booth & A. Delgado; Ramirezella crassa (McVaugh) Ochot.-Booth & A. Delgado; Ramirezella lozanii (Rose) Piper; Ramirezella micrantha A. Delgado & Ochot.-Booth; Ramirezella nitida Piper; Ramirezella penduliflora A. Delgado & Ochot.-Booth; Ramirezella strobilophora (B.L.Rob.) Rose

= Ramirezella (plant) =

Genus of legumes

Ramirezella is a small genus of flowering plants in the family Fabaceae. It includes seven species of climbing herbs native to southern North America, ranging from northern Mexico and Nicaragua. Typical habitats include seasonally-dry tropical forest and secondary vegetation in disturbed areas. It belongs to the subfamily Faboideae.
