= Burkilliodendron =

Scientific classification
- Kingdom: Plantae
- Clade: Tracheophytes
- Clade: Angiosperms
- Clade: Eudicots
- Clade: Rosids
- Order: Fabales
- Family: Fabaceae
- Subfamily: Faboideae
- Genus: Burkilliodendron; Sastry (1969)
- Species: B. album

Binomial name
- Burkilliodendron album (Ridl.) Sastry (1969)

Synonyms
- Alloburkillia Whitmore (1969), nom. illeg.; Alloburkillia alba (Ridl.) Whitmore (1969); Burkillia Ridl. (1925), nom. illeg.; Burkillia alba Ridl. (1925)

Genus of legumes

Burkilliodendron is a genus of flowering plants in the legume family, Fabaceae. It contains a single species, Burkilliodendron album, a shrub or tree native to Peninsular Thailand and Peninsular Malaysia. The genus belongs to subfamily Faboideae.
