= Eremosparton =

Scientific classification
- Kingdom: Plantae
- Clade: Tracheophytes
- Clade: Angiosperms
- Clade: Eudicots
- Clade: Rosids
- Order: Fabales
- Family: Fabaceae
- Subfamily: Faboideae
- Subtribe: Astragalinae
- Genus: Eremosparton; Fisch. & C.A.Mey. (1841)

Species
- Eremosparton aphyllum (Pall.) Fisch. & C.A.Mey.; Eremosparton flaccidum Litv.; Eremosparton songoricum (Litv.) Vassilcz.

Genus of legumes

Eremosparton is a genus of flowering plants in the legume family, Fabaceae. It belongs to subfamily Faboideae. It includes three species native to Eurasia, which range from the Caucasus and southern European Russia through Central Asia (Kazakhstan, Uzbekistan, Kyrgyzstan, and Turkmenistan) to Xinjiang.
