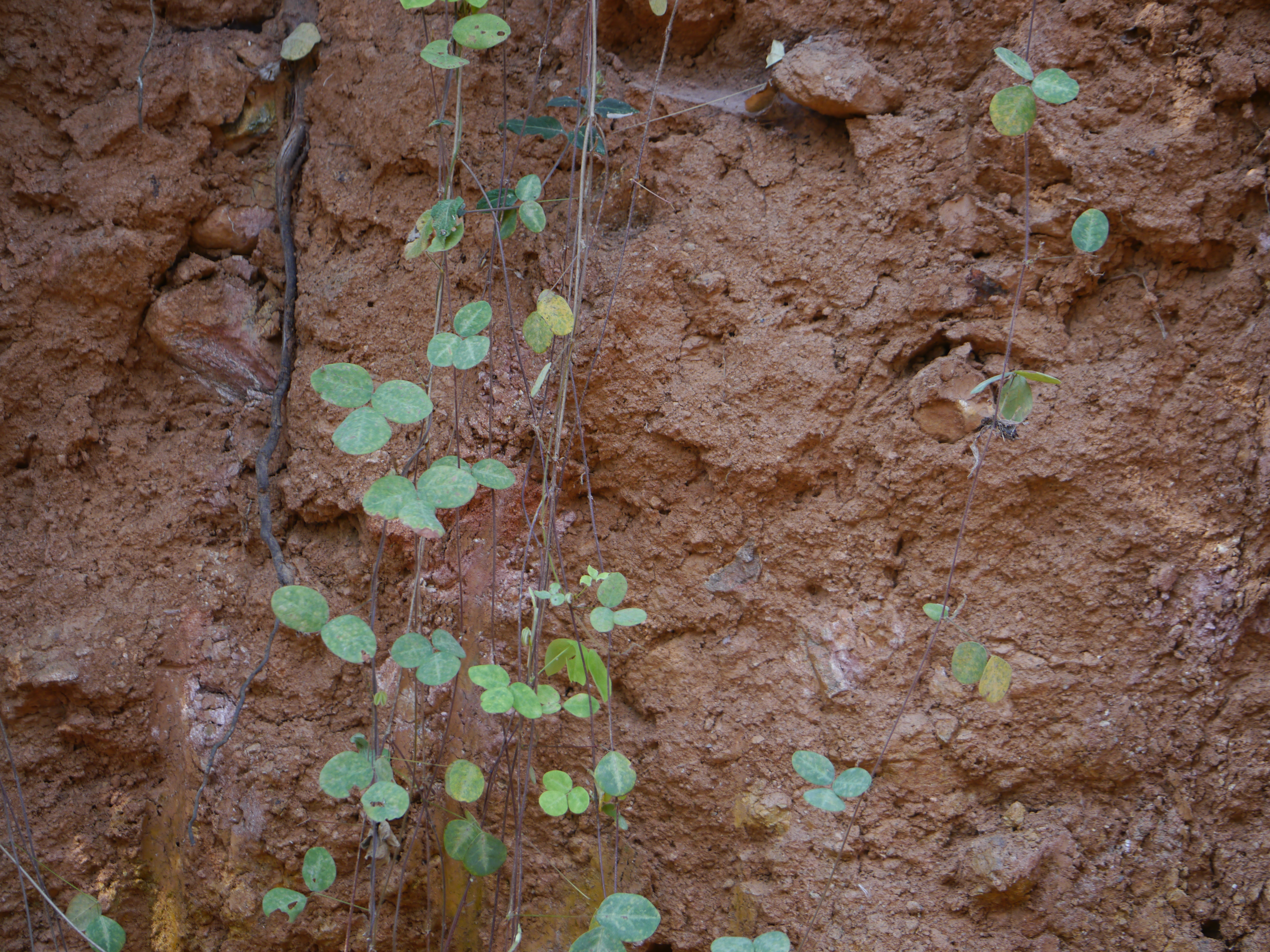
- Shuteria vestita

Scientific classification
- Kingdom: Plantae
- Clade: Tracheophytes
- Clade: Angiosperms
- Clade: Eudicots
- Clade: Rosids
- Order: Fabales
- Family: Fabaceae
- Subfamily: Faboideae
- Tribe: Phaseoleae
- Genus: Shuteria; Wight & Arn. (1834)

Species
- Shuteria annamica Gagnep.; Shuteria involucrata (Wall.) Wight & Arn. ex Walp.; Shuteria suffulta Benth.; Shuteria vestita Wight & Arn.

Synonyms
- Shutereia Choisy

= Shuteria =

Genus of legumes

Shuteria is a genus of flowering plants in the family Fabaceae. It includes four species of climbing herbs or lianas which range from the Indian subcontinent through Indochina, southern China, and Malesia to Papuasia. They grow in seasonally-dry tropical and subtropical forest margins, secondary forest, woodland, or scrub, often in open areas and on limestone. It belongs to the subfamily Faboideae. Some species of Shuteria are used in traditional medicines.
