= Toxicopueraria =

Scientific classification
- Kingdom: Plantae
- Clade: Tracheophytes
- Clade: Angiosperms
- Clade: Eudicots
- Clade: Rosids
- Order: Fabales
- Family: Fabaceae
- Subfamily: Faboideae
- Tribe: Phaseoleae
- Subtribe: Glycininae
- Genus: Toxicopueraria; A.N.Egan & B.Pan

Genus of flowering plants

Toxicopueraria is a genus of flowering plants belonging to the family Fabaceae.

Its native range is Pakistan to Southern China and Northern Indo-China.

Species:

- Toxicopueraria peduncularis (Benth.) A.N.Egan & B.Pan
- Toxicopueraria yunnanensis (Franch.) A.N.Egan & B.Pan
