= Smirnowia =

Scientific classification
- Kingdom: Plantae
- Clade: Tracheophytes
- Clade: Angiosperms
- Clade: Eudicots
- Clade: Rosids
- Order: Fabales
- Family: Fabaceae
- Subfamily: Faboideae
- Genus: Smirnowia; Bunge (1876)
- Species: S. turkestana

Binomial name
- Smirnowia turkestana Bunge (1876)

Synonyms
- Eremosparton turkestanum (Bunge) Franch. (1883); Smirnowia iranica Sabeti (1976), no Latin descr. or type.

Genus of legumes

Smirnowia is a genus of flowering plants in the legume family, Fabaceae. It contains a single species, Smirnowia turkestana, a perennial shrub native to Afghanistan, Iran, Turkmenistan, and Uzbekistan. It belongs to the subfamily Faboideae.
