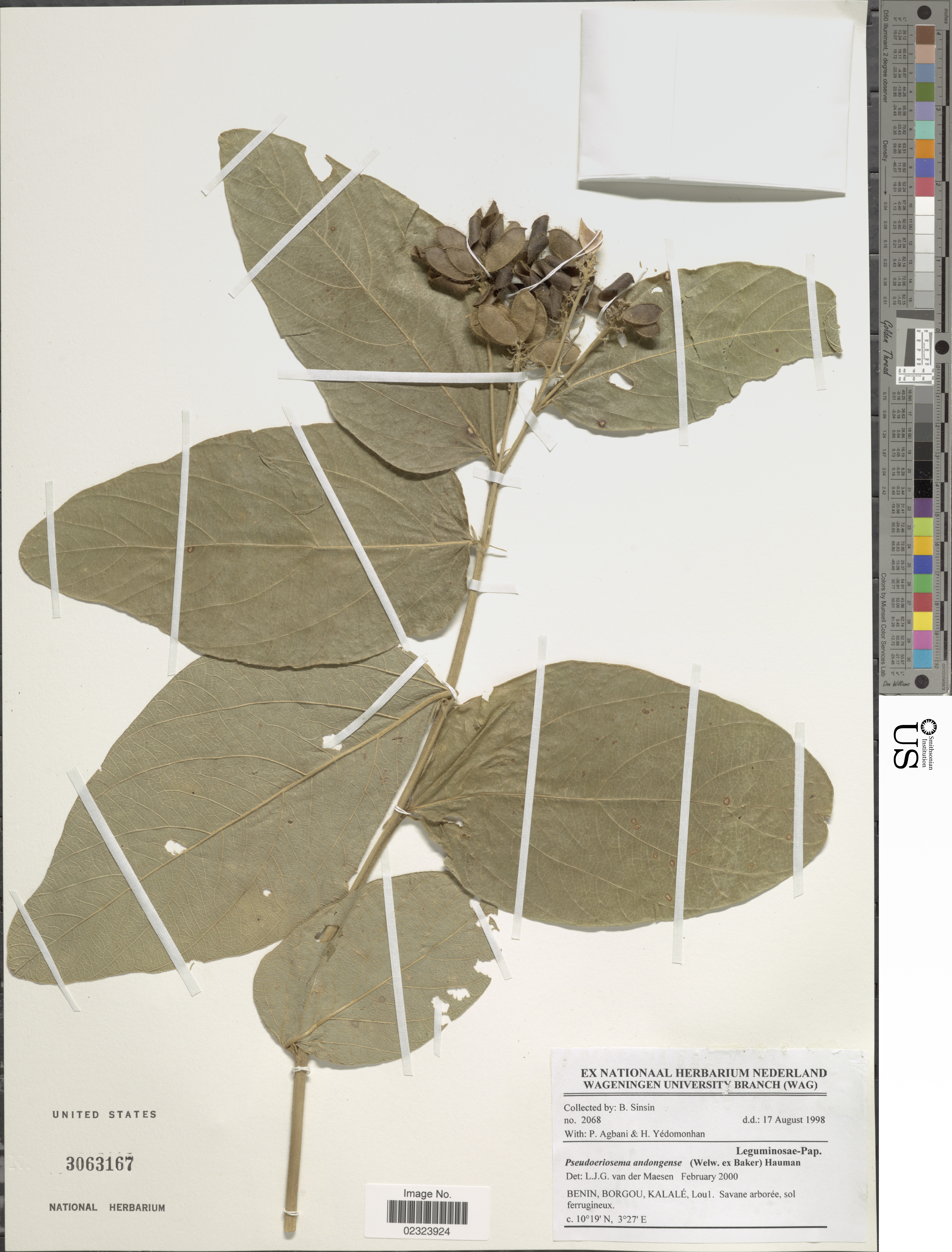
- Pseudoeriosema andongense

Scientific classification
- Kingdom: Plantae
- Clade: Tracheophytes
- Clade: Angiosperms
- Clade: Eudicots
- Clade: Rosids
- Order: Fabales
- Family: Fabaceae
- Subfamily: Faboideae
- Tribe: Phaseoleae
- Subtribe: Ophrestiinae
- Genus: Pseudoeriosema; Hauman (1955)

Species
- 5; see text

= Pseudoeriosema =

Genus of legumes

Pseudoeriosema is a genus of flowering plants in the legume family, Fabaceae. It includes five species of herbs or shrubs native to tropical Africa. Typical habitats include seasonally-dry tropical woodland, wooded grassland, and seasonally swampy grassland in the Zambezian, Sudanian, and Somali-Masai regions. It belongs to the subfamily Faboideae.

- Pseudoeriosema andongense (Welw. ex Baker) Hauman
- Pseudoeriosema borianii (Schweinf.) Hauman
- Pseudoeriosema homblei (De Wild.) Hauman
- Pseudoeriosema longipes (Harms) Hauman
- Pseudoeriosema moeroense (De Wild.) Hauman
