= Dysolobium =

Scientific classification
- Kingdom: Plantae
- Clade: Tracheophytes
- Clade: Angiosperms
- Clade: Eudicots
- Clade: Rosids
- Order: Fabales
- Family: Fabaceae
- Subfamily: Faboideae
- Tribe: Phaseoleae
- Genus: Dysolobium (Benth.) Prain (1897)

Species
- Dysolobium dolichoides (Kurz) Prain; Dysolobium grande (Wall. ex Benth.) Prain; Dysolobium lucens (Benth.) Prain; Dysolobium pilosum (J.G.Klein ex Willd.) Maréchal; Dysolobium tetragonun Prain

Synonyms
- Dolichovigna Hayata (1920)

Genus of legumes

Dysolobium is a genus of flowering plants in the legume family, Fabaceae. It belongs to the subfamily Faboideae. It includes five species native to tropical Asia, ranging from the Himalayas through Indochina to southern China, Taiwan, the Philippines, Peninsular Malaysia, and Java. These plants are typically twining shrubs or woody vines, often found in wet tropical biomes, thriving in humid forests and along riverbanks.
