= Clitoriopsis =

Scientific classification
- Kingdom: Plantae
- Clade: Tracheophytes
- Clade: Angiosperms
- Clade: Eudicots
- Clade: Rosids
- Order: Fabales
- Family: Fabaceae
- Subfamily: Faboideae
- Tribe: Phaseoleae
- Subtribe: Clitoriinae
- Genus: Clitoriopsis; R.Wilczek (1954)
- Species: C. mollis

Binomial name
- Clitoriopsis mollis R.Wilczek (1954)

Genus of legumes

Clitoriopsis is a genus of flowering plants in the legume family, Fabaceae. It belongs to the subfamily Faboideae. The genus contains a single species, Clitoriopsis mollis, a subshrub native to South Sudan and Democratic Republic of the Congo. It grows in seasonally-dry tropical forest margins, woodland, and wooded grassland.
