= Pseudovigna =

Scientific classification
- Kingdom: Plantae
- Clade: Tracheophytes
- Clade: Angiosperms
- Clade: Eudicots
- Clade: Rosids
- Order: Fabales
- Family: Fabaceae
- Subfamily: Faboideae
- Subtribe: Glycininae
- Genus: Pseudovigna (Harms) Verdc. (1970)

Species
- Pseudovigna argentea (Willd.) Verdc.; Pseudovigna puerarioides Ern; Pseudovigna sulaensis R.Clark & Burgt

Genus of legumes

Pseudovigna is a genus of flowering plants in the legume family, Fabaceae. It includes three species of trailing or climbing perennial herbs native to tropical Africa, in Sierra Leone and Ghana to Nigeria in West Africa, and Kenya to Mozambique and Zimbabwe in east Africa. It belongs to subfamily Faboideae.
