= Pseudeminia =

Scientific classification
- Kingdom: Plantae
- Clade: Tracheophytes
- Clade: Angiosperms
- Clade: Eudicots
- Clade: Rosids
- Order: Fabales
- Family: Fabaceae
- Subfamily: Faboideae
- Subtribe: Glycininae
- Genus: Pseudeminia; Verdc. (1970)

Synonyms
- Muxiria Welw. (1859)

Genus of legumes

Pseudeminia is a genus of flowering plants in the legume family, Fabaceae. It belongs to the subfamily Faboideae. It includes four species of herbs or subshrubs native to southern and central tropical Africa, mostly in the Zambezian region. Typical habitats include seasonally-dry tropical woodland, thicket, bushland, wooded grassland, and scrubland, and in former cultivated areas.

- Pseudeminia benguellensis (Torre) Verdc.
- Pseudeminia comosa (Baker) Verdc.
- Pseudeminia mendoncae (Torre) Verdc.
- Pseudeminia muxiria (Welw. ex Baker) Verdc.
