= Dolichopsis =

Scientific classification
- Kingdom: Plantae
- Clade: Embryophytes
- Clade: Tracheophytes
- Clade: Spermatophytes
- Clade: Angiosperms
- Clade: Eudicots
- Clade: Rosids
- Order: Fabales
- Family: Fabaceae
- Subfamily: Faboideae
- Tribe: Phaseoleae
- Subtribe: Phaseolinae
- Genus: Dolichopsis; Hassl. (1907)

Species
- Dolichopsis ligulata (Piper) A.Delgado; Dolichopsis monticola (Mart. ex Benth.) J.A.Lackey ex G.P.Lewis; Dolichopsis paraguariensis Hassl.

Synonyms
- Oryxis A.Delgado & G.P.Lewis (1997)

Genus of legumes

Dolichopsis is a small genus of flowering plants in the legume family, Fabaceae. It belongs to the subfamily Faboideae. It includes three species native to South America, ranging from west-central and southeastern Brazil to Bolivia, Paraguay, and northern Argentina.
