= Alistilus =

Scientific classification
- Kingdom: Plantae
- Clade: Tracheophytes
- Clade: Angiosperms
- Clade: Eudicots
- Clade: Rosids
- Order: Fabales
- Family: Fabaceae
- Subfamily: Faboideae
- Subtribe: Phaseolinae
- Genus: Alistilus; N.E.Br. (1921)

Species
- Alistilus bechuanicus N.E.Br.; Alistilus jumellei (R. Vig.) Verdc.; Alistilus magnificus Verdc.

Synonyms
- Alysistyles N.E.Br. ex R.A.Dyer (1975), orth. var.

Genus of legumes

Alistilus is a genus of flowering plants in the legume family, Fabaceae. It belongs to the subfamily Faboideae. It includes three species native to southern Africa and Madagascar.

- Alistilus bechuanicus N.E.Br. – Namibia, Botswana, South Africa (Northern Provinces)
- Alistilus jumellei (R. Vig.) Verdc. – south-central and southern Madagascar
- Alistilus magnificus Verdc. – south-central Madagascar
