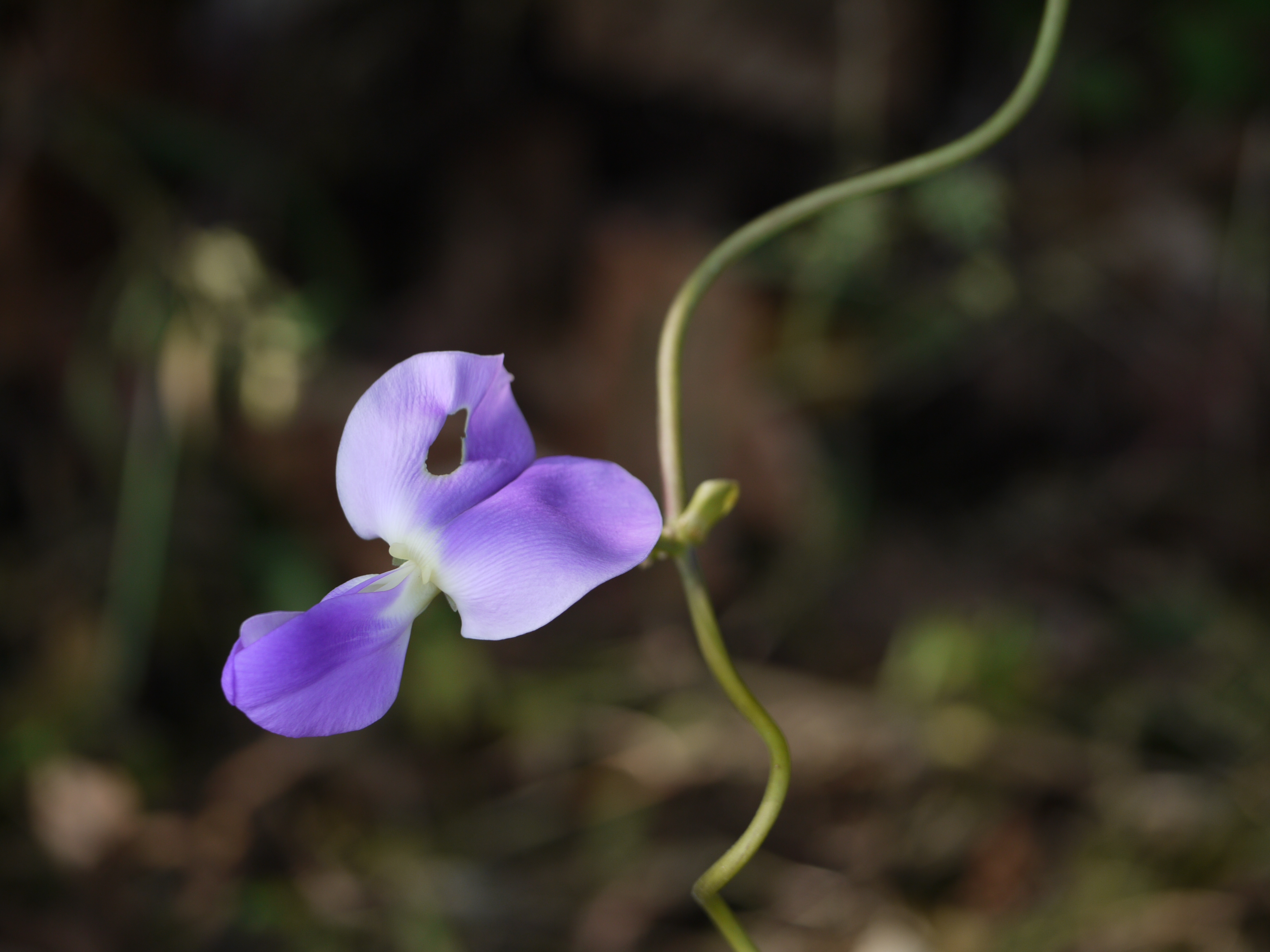
- Nesphostylis bracteata

Scientific classification
- Kingdom: Plantae
- Clade: Tracheophytes
- Clade: Angiosperms
- Clade: Eudicots
- Clade: Rosids
- Order: Fabales
- Family: Fabaceae
- Subfamily: Faboideae
- Subtribe: Phaseolinae
- Genus: Nesphostylis; Verdc. (1970)

Species
- Nesphostylis bracteata (Baker) D.Potter & J.J.Doyle; Nesphostylis holosericea (Welw. ex Baker) Verdc.; Nesphostylis lanceolata (Graham ex Baker) H.Ohashi & Tateishi

= Nesphostylis =

Genus of legumes

Nesphostylis is a genus of flowering plants in the legume family, Fabaceae. It belongs to the subfamily Faboideae. It was previously believed to be a monotypic African genus consisting of the species N. holosericea from West and East Africa, but a second species, Nesphostylis lanceolata, was found in Burma in 1977. A third species, N. bracteata, was found in India.
