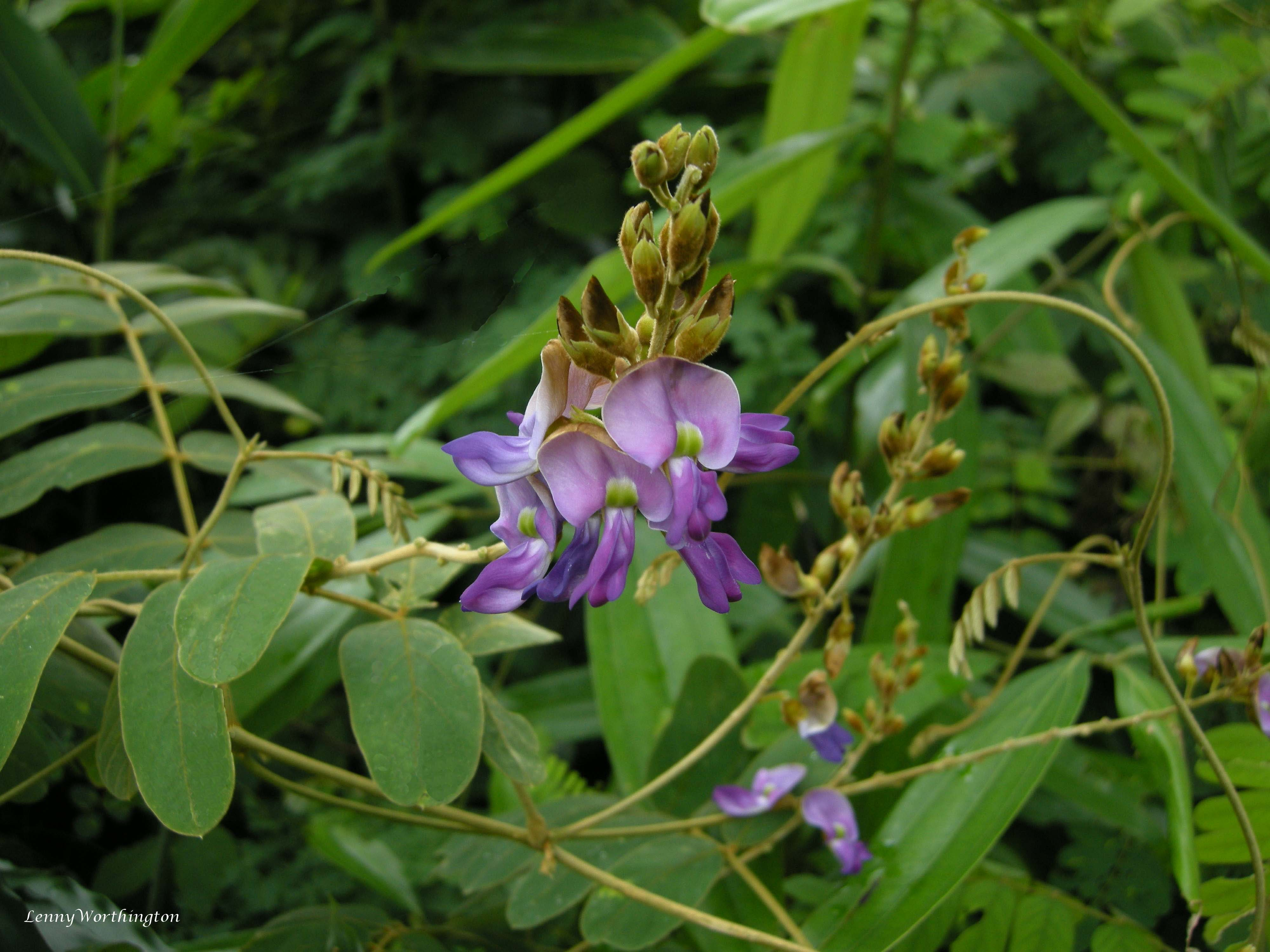
- Cruddasia multifoliolata Leguminosae

Scientific classification
- Kingdom: Plantae
- Clade: Tracheophytes
- Clade: Angiosperms
- Clade: Eudicots
- Clade: Rosids
- Order: Fabales
- Family: Fabaceae
- Subfamily: Faboideae
- Tribe: Phaseoleae
- Subtribe: Ophrestiinae
- Genus: Cruddasia; Prain

= Cruddasia =

Genus of legumes

Cruddasia is a genus of flowering plants in the legume family, Fabaceae. It belongs to the subfamily Faboideae.

== Species ==
- Cruddasia craibii
- Cruddasia insignis
- Cruddasia laotica
- Cruddasia multifoliolata
- Cruddasia pinnata
