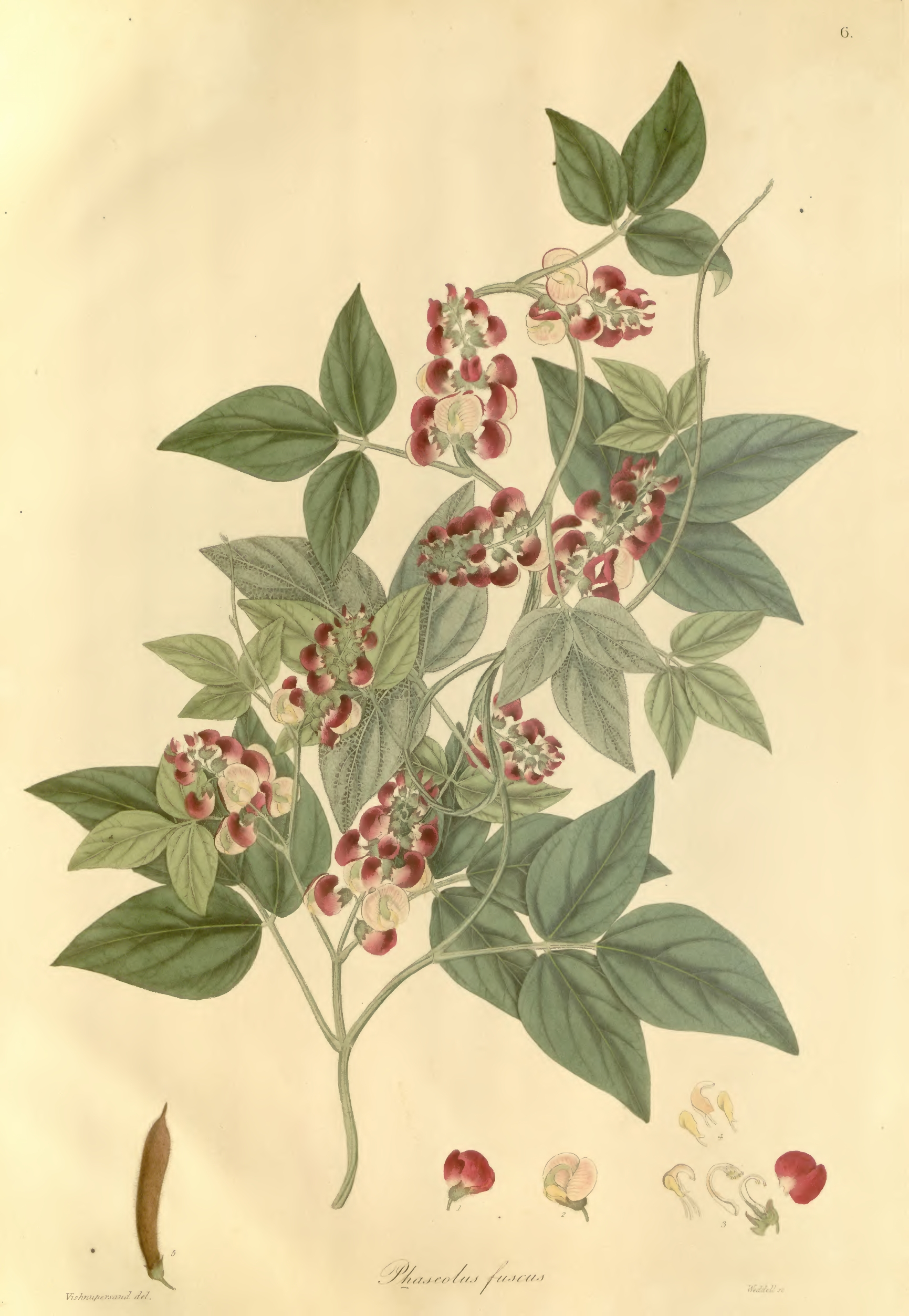
- Dunbaria fusca

Scientific classification
- Kingdom: Plantae
- Clade: Embryophytes
- Clade: Tracheophytes
- Clade: Angiosperms
- Clade: Eudicots
- Clade: Rosids
- Order: Fabales
- Family: Fabaceae
- Subfamily: Faboideae
- Tribe: Phaseoleae
- Subtribe: Cajaninae
- Genus: Dunbaria; Wight & Arn. (1834), nom. cons.

Species
- 19; see text.

= Dunbaria =

Genus of legumes

Dunbaria is a genus of flowering plants in the family Fabaceae. It belongs to the subfamily Faboideae. It includes 19 species which range from India to Indochina, China, Korea, Japan, Malesia, New Guinea, and northern Australia.

== Uses ==
Root tubers of Dunbaria species have been used as traditional food for Aborigines of the Northern Territory.

== Species ==
19 species are accepted:

- Dunbaria bella Prain
- Dunbaria circinalis (Benth.) Baker
- Dunbaria cumingiana Benth.
- Dunbaria debilis Baker
- Dunbaria ferruginea Wight & Arn.
- Dunbaria floresiana Maesen
- Dunbaria fusca (Wall.) Kurz
- Dunbaria glabra Thuan
- Dunbaria glandulosa (Dalzell & A.Gibson) Prain
- Dunbaria gracilipes Lace
- Dunbaria incana (Zoll. & Moritzi) Maesen
- Dunbaria lecomtei Gagnep.
- Dunbaria longicarpa (Thuan) Maesen
- Dunbaria podocarpa Kurz
- Dunbaria punctata (Wight & Arn.) Benth.
- Dunbaria rubella Span. ex Miq.
- Dunbaria trichodon (Dunn) Maesen
- Dunbaria truncata (Miq.) Maesen
- Dunbaria villosa (Thunb.) Makino
