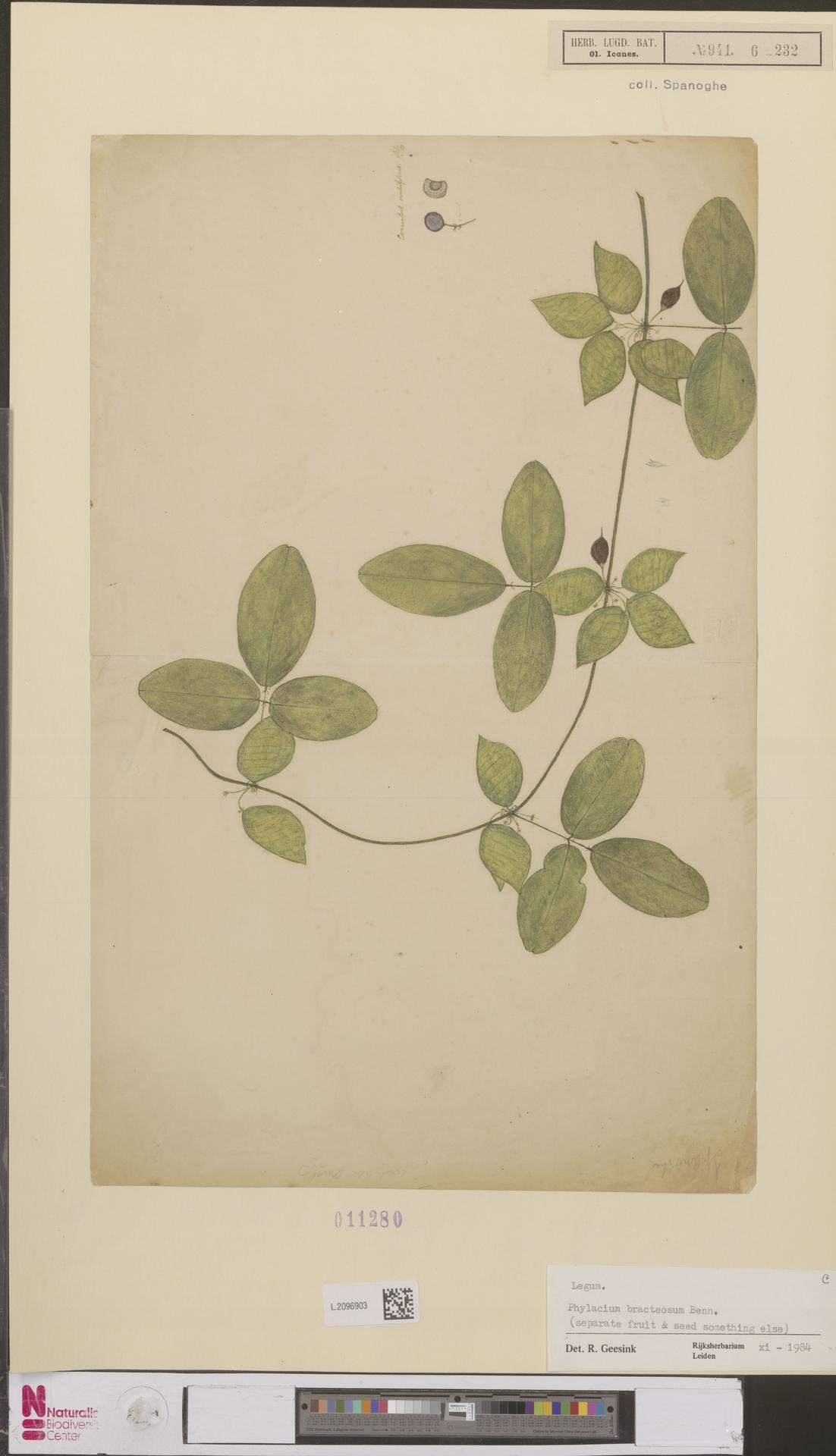
- Phylacium bracteosum

Scientific classification
- Kingdom: Plantae
- Clade: Tracheophytes
- Clade: Angiosperms
- Clade: Eudicots
- Clade: Rosids
- Order: Fabales
- Family: Fabaceae
- Subfamily: Faboideae
- Subtribe: Glycininae
- Genus: Phylacium; Benn. (1840)

Species
- Phylacium bracteosum Benn.; Phylacium majus Collett & Hemsl.

Synonyms
- Heleiotis Hassk. (1844)

= Phylacium =

Genus of legumes

Phylacium is a genus of flowering plants in the legume family, Fabaceae. It includes two species of climbing herbs which range from southern China through Indochina, Malesia, and Papuasia to Queensland. Typical habitats include seasonally-dry tropical forest, thicket, wooded grassland, and scrub, often in disturbed areas. It belongs to subfamily Faboideae.
