= Cochlianthus =

Scientific classification
- Kingdom: Plantae
- Clade: Tracheophytes
- Clade: Angiosperms
- Clade: Eudicots
- Clade: Rosids
- Order: Fabales
- Family: Fabaceae
- Subfamily: Faboideae
- Tribe: Phaseoleae
- Genus: Cochlianthus; Benth.

Species
- Cochlianthus gracilis Benth.; Cochlianthus montanus (Diels) Harms

Genus of legumes

Cochlianthus is a genus of flowering plants in the family Fabaceae. It belongs to subfamily Faboideae. It contains two species, native to the central and eastern Himalayas, Tibet, and south-central China.

== Species ==
- Cochlianthus gracilis Benth. – central and eastern Himalayas, Tibet, and south-central China
- Cochlianthus montanus (Diels) Harms – southeastern Tibet and southwestern Yunnan
