= Mastersia =

Scientific classification
- Kingdom: Plantae
- Clade: Embryophytes
- Clade: Tracheophytes
- Clade: Angiosperms
- Clade: Eudicots
- Clade: Rosids
- Order: Fabales
- Family: Fabaceae
- Subfamily: Faboideae
- Tribe: Phaseoleae
- Genus: Mastersia; Benth. (1865)

Species
- Mastersia assamica Benth.; Mastersia bakeri (Koord.) Backer ex Koord.-Schum.

Genus of legumes

Mastersia is an Asian genus of flowering plants in the legume family, Fabaceae. It belongs to the subfamily Faboideae. It contains two species of lianas or twining herbs. Typical habitat is seasonally-dry tropical forest, often in open places, including both wet and dry sites.

- Mastersia assamica Benth. – eastern Himalayas, Tibet, Assam, and Myanmar
- Mastersia bakeri (Koord.) Backer ex Koord.-Schum. – central Malesia, including Borneo, Java, Sulawesi, and the Maluku Islands

The genus is named after Maxwell Tylden Masters.
