= Sinodolichos =

Scientific classification
- Kingdom: Plantae
- Clade: Embryophytes
- Clade: Tracheophytes
- Clade: Spermatophytes
- Clade: Angiosperms
- Clade: Eudicots
- Clade: Rosids
- Order: Fabales
- Family: Fabaceae
- Subfamily: Faboideae
- Subtribe: Glycininae
- Genus: Sinodolichos; Verdc. (1970)

Species
- Sinodolichos lagopus (Dunn) Verdc.; Sinodolichos oxyphyllus (Benth.) Verdc.

Genus of legumes

Sinodolichos is a genus of flowering plants in the legume family, Fabaceae. It includes two species native to southern China, Assam, Myanmar, Thailand, Vietnam, and Borneo. It belongs to subfamily Faboideae.
