= Nogra =

Scientific classification
- Kingdom: Plantae
- Clade: Tracheophytes
- Clade: Angiosperms
- Clade: Eudicots
- Clade: Rosids
- Order: Fabales
- Family: Fabaceae
- Subfamily: Faboideae
- Subtribe: Glycininae
- Genus: Nogra; Merr.

Species
- Nogra dalzellii (Baker) Merr.; Nogra filicaulis (Kurz) Merr.; Nogra grahamii (Wall. ex Benth.) Merr.; Nogra guangxiensis C.F.Wei

Genus of legumes

Nogra is a genus of flowering plants in the legume family, Fabaceae. It includes four species of herbs native to Asia, ranging from India to Myanmar, Thailand, Laos, and southern China. They typically grow in seasonally-dry tropical forest, often in open grassy areas. The genus belongs to subfamily Faboideae.

The genus is phylogenetically allied with Pueraria.
