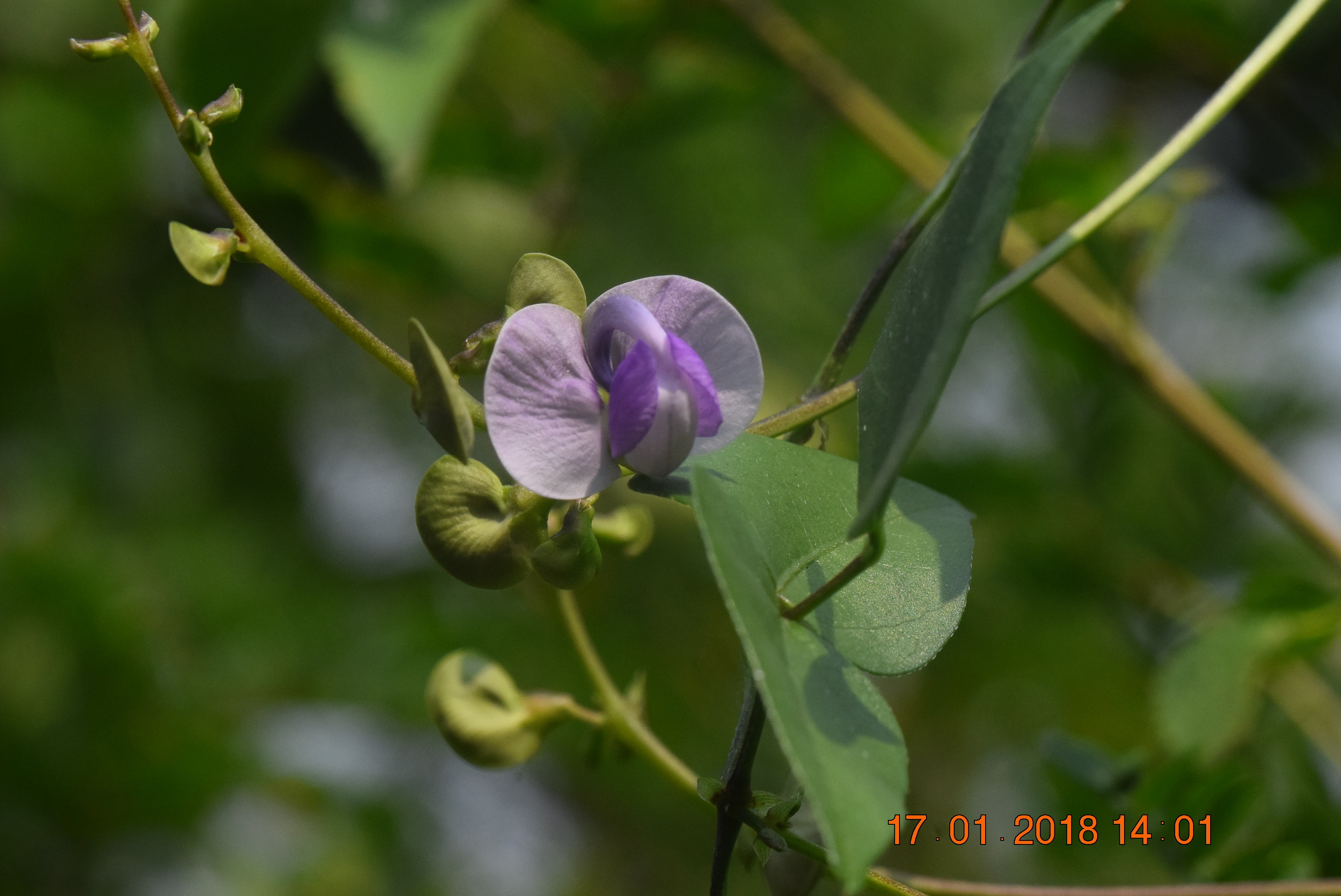

Scientific classification
- Kingdom: Plantae
- Clade: Tracheophytes
- Clade: Angiosperms
- Clade: Eudicots
- Clade: Rosids
- Order: Fabales
- Family: Fabaceae
- Subfamily: Faboideae
- Subtribe: Phaseolinae
- Genus: Wajira; Thulin (1982)

Type species
- Wajira albescens Thulin

Species
- Wajira albescens Thulin; Wajira danissana Thulin & Lavin; Wajira grahamiana (Wight & Arn.) Thulin & Lavin; Wajira praecox (Verdc.) Thulin & Lavin; Wajira virescens (Thulin) Thulin & Lavin
- Range of the legume genus Wajira

Synonyms
- Vigna subg. Macrorhynchus Verdc. (1970)

= Wajira =

Genus of legumes

Wajira is a small genus of flowering plants in the legume family, Fabaceae. It includes five species of climbing herbs or subshrubs native to tropical Africa, the Indian subcontinent, and Thailand. Four species are native to the Somali-Masai region of northeastern tropical Africa. Wajira grahamiana is more widespread in Africa and ranges to the Indian subcontinent and Indochina. Typical habitats are seasonally-dry tropical forest, woodland, bushland, and grassland. It belongs to the subfamily Faboideae. Species in this genus were formerly considered to belong to the genus Vigna. A key for the genus has been published.
