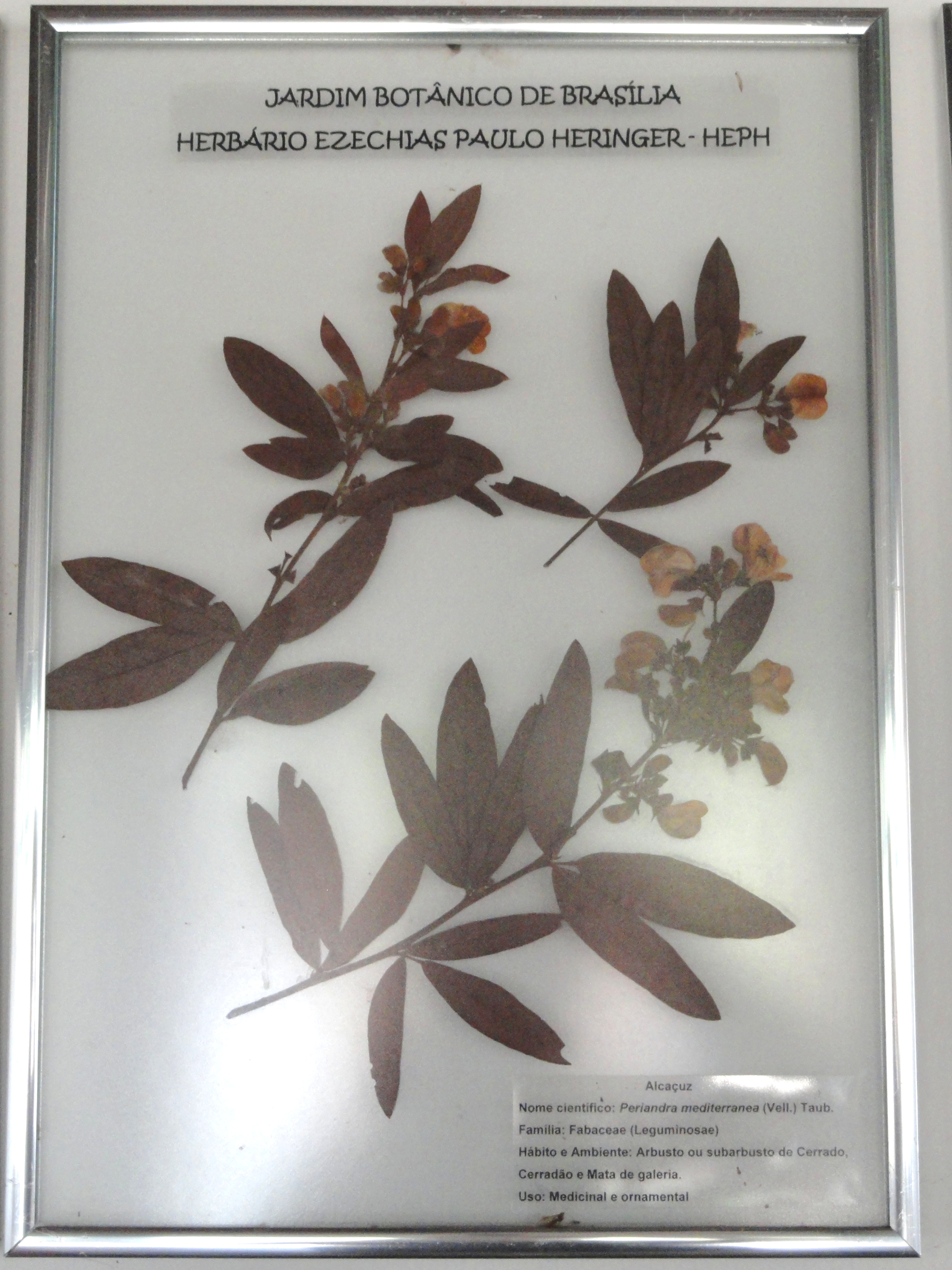
- Periandra mediterranea

Scientific classification
- Kingdom: Plantae
- Clade: Tracheophytes
- Clade: Angiosperms
- Clade: Eudicots
- Clade: Rosids
- Order: Fabales
- Family: Fabaceae
- Subfamily: Faboideae
- Tribe: Phaseoleae
- Subtribe: Clitoriinae
- Genus: Periandra; Mart. ex Benth. (1837)

Species
- 7; see text

Synonyms
- Glycinopsis Kuntze (1891)

= Periandra =

Genus of legumes

Periandra is a genus of flowering plants in the legume family Fabaceae. It includes seven species native to the tropical Americas, including Brazil, Bolivia, and the Dominican Republic. The genus belongs to subfamily Faboideae.

== Species ==
- Periandra berteroana (DC.) Benth.
- Periandra coccinea (Schrad.) Benth.
- Periandra densiflora Benth.
- Periandra gracilis H.S.Irwin & Arroyo
- Periandra heterophylla Benth.
- Periandra mediterranea (Vell.) Taub.
- Periandra pujalu Emmerich & L.Senna
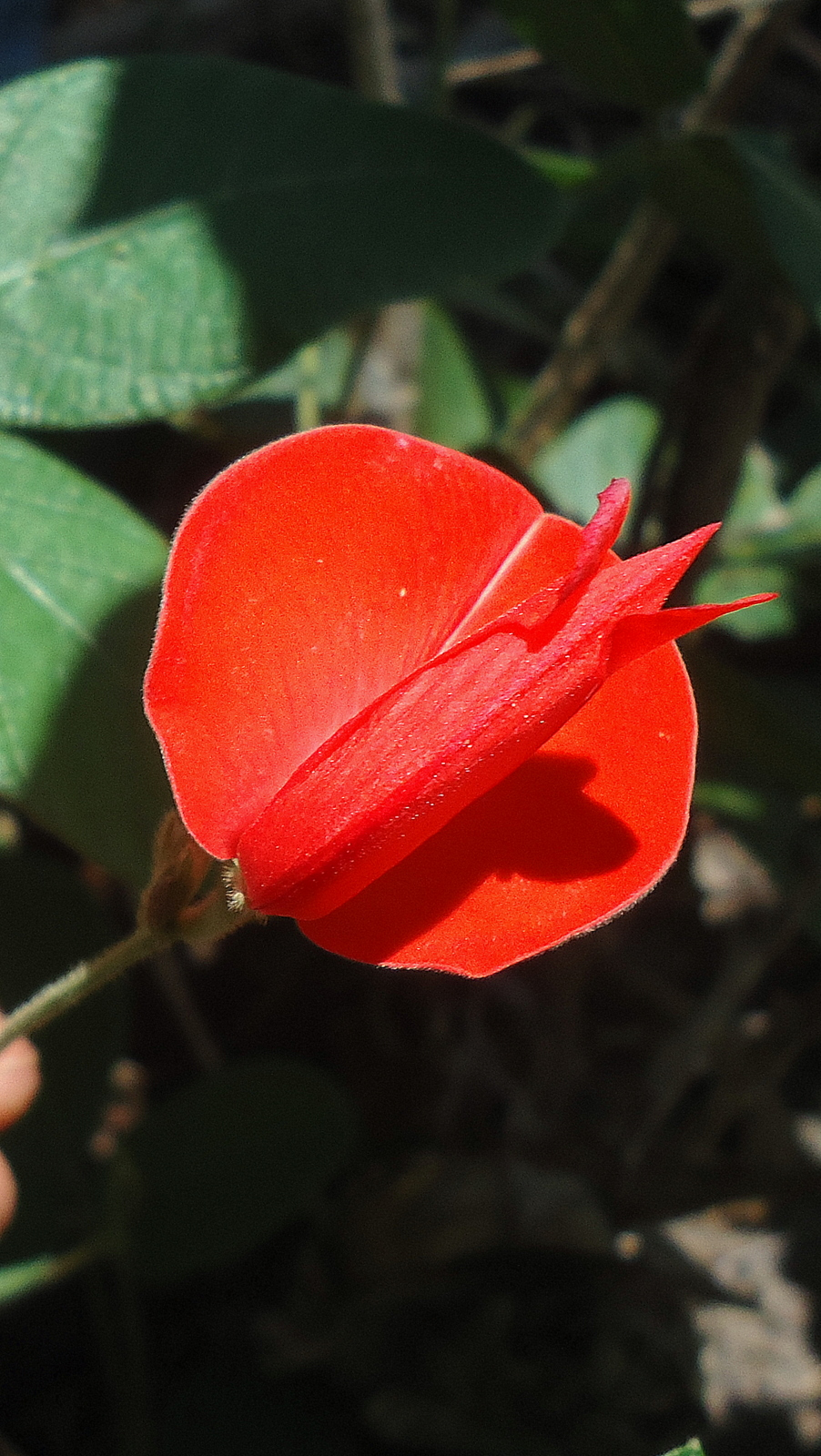
Periandra coccinea in Bahia

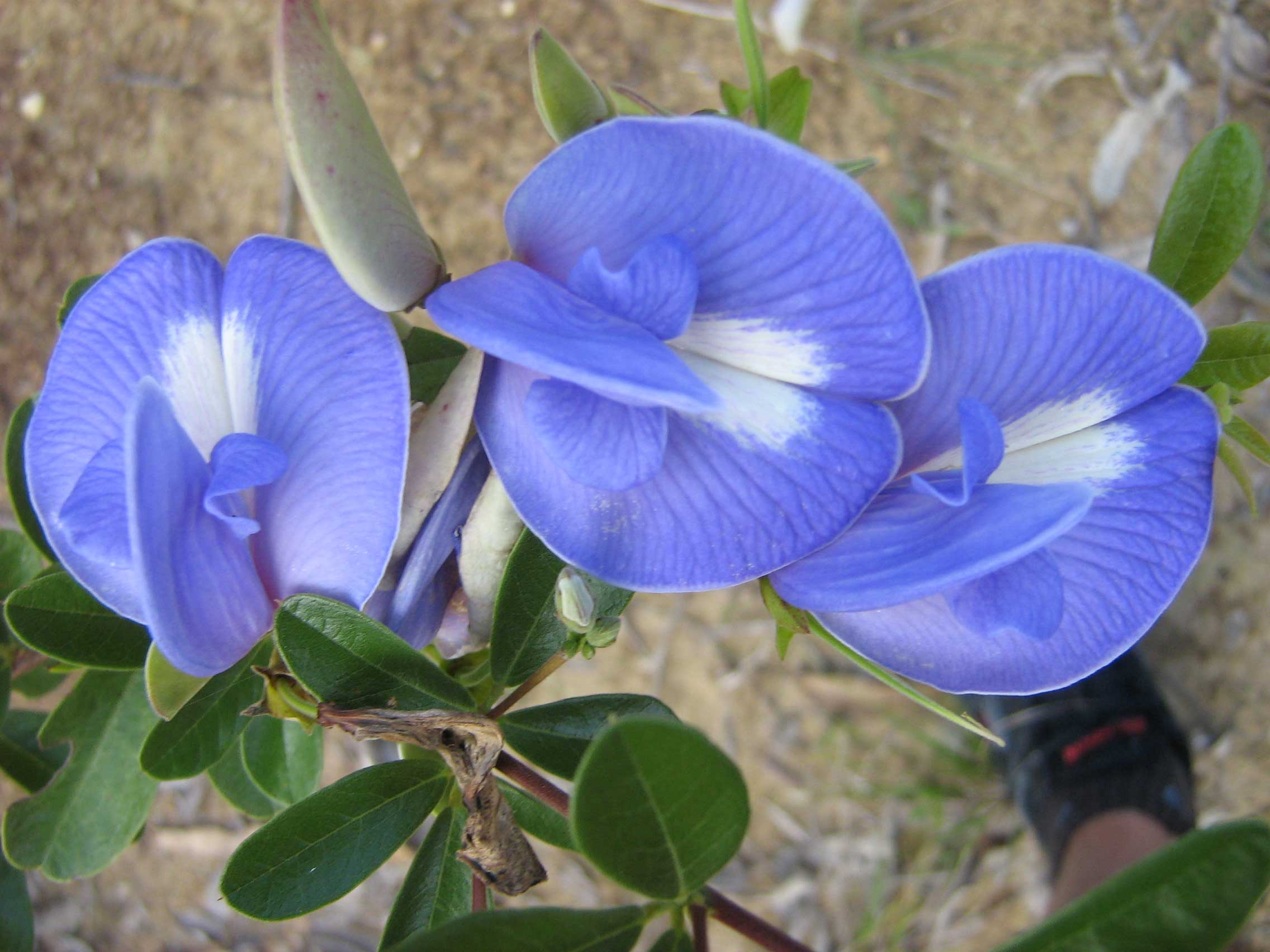
Periandra mediterranea in Bahia

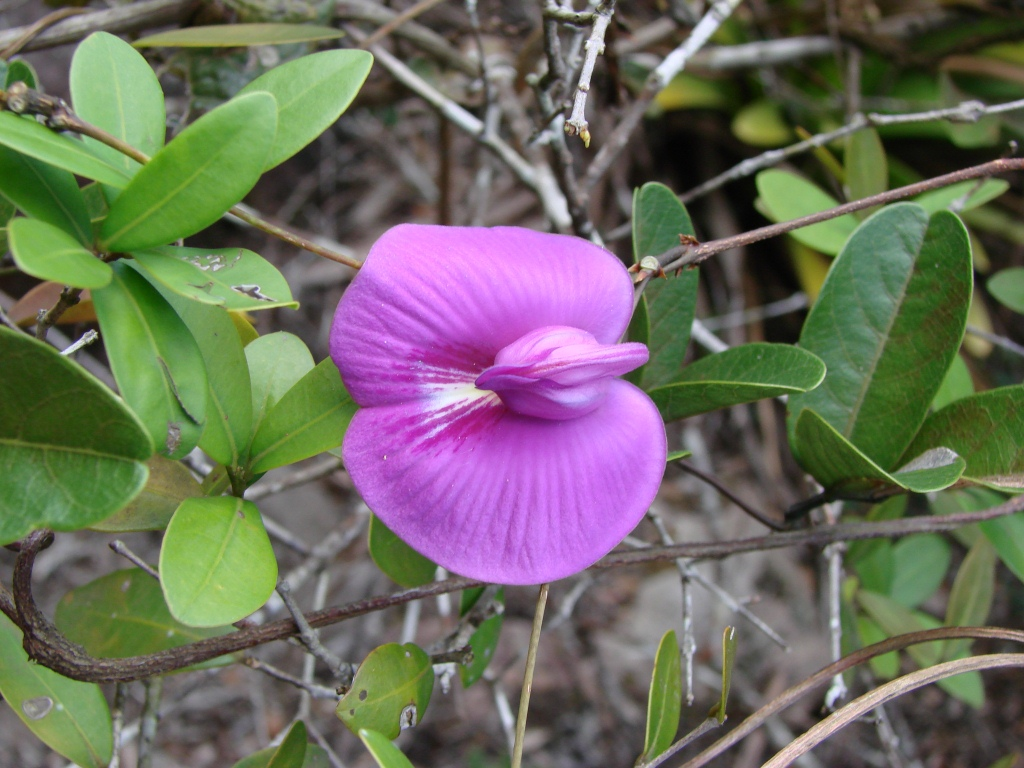
Periandra pujalu in Bahia
