= Austrodolichos =

Scientific classification
- Kingdom: Plantae
- Clade: Tracheophytes
- Clade: Angiosperms
- Clade: Eudicots
- Clade: Rosids
- Order: Fabales
- Family: Fabaceae
- Subfamily: Faboideae
- Tribe: Phaseoleae
- Subtribe: Phaseolinae
- Genus: Austrodolichos; Verdc. (1970)
- Species: A. errabundus

Binomial name
- Austrodolichos errabundus (M.B.Scott) Verdc. (1970)

Synonyms
- Dolichos errabundus M.B.Scott (1915); Vigna canescens C.T.White (1935 publ. 1936)

Genus of legumes

Austrodolichos is a genus of flowering plants in the legume family, Fabaceae. It belongs to the subfamily Faboideae. It includes a single species, Austrodolichos errabundus, native to northern Australia.

== Description ==
These plants are vines with tuberous roots. The stems are covered in simple hairs. Leaves are 3-foliolate with upper surfaces darker than the lower surface. The inflorescences are axillary, with one or two stemmed pink to purple flowers.

== Uses ==
Root tubers of Austrodolichos species have been traditional food for Aborigines of the Northern Territory.
