= Condylostylis =

Scientific classification
- Kingdom: Plantae
- Clade: Tracheophytes
- Clade: Angiosperms
- Clade: Eudicots
- Clade: Rosids
- Order: Fabales
- Family: Fabaceae
- Subfamily: Faboideae
- Subtribe: Phaseolinae
- Genus: Condylostylis; Piper (1926)

Type species
- Condylostylis venusta Piper

Synonyms
- Vigna sect. Condylostylis (Piper) Maréchal et al. (1978)

Genus of legumes

Condylostylis is a small genus of flowering plants in the legume family, Fabaceae. It belongs to subfamily Faboideae. The genus includes four species native to the tropical Americas, ranging from southeastern Mexico to northern Argentina. Species in this genus were formerly considered to belong to the genus Vigna.

There are four species in the genus Condylostylis:

- Condylostylis candida (Vell.) A. Delgado
- Condylostylis latidenticulata (Harms) A. Delgado
- Condylostylis venusta Piper
- Condylostylis vignoides (Rusby) A. Delgado
