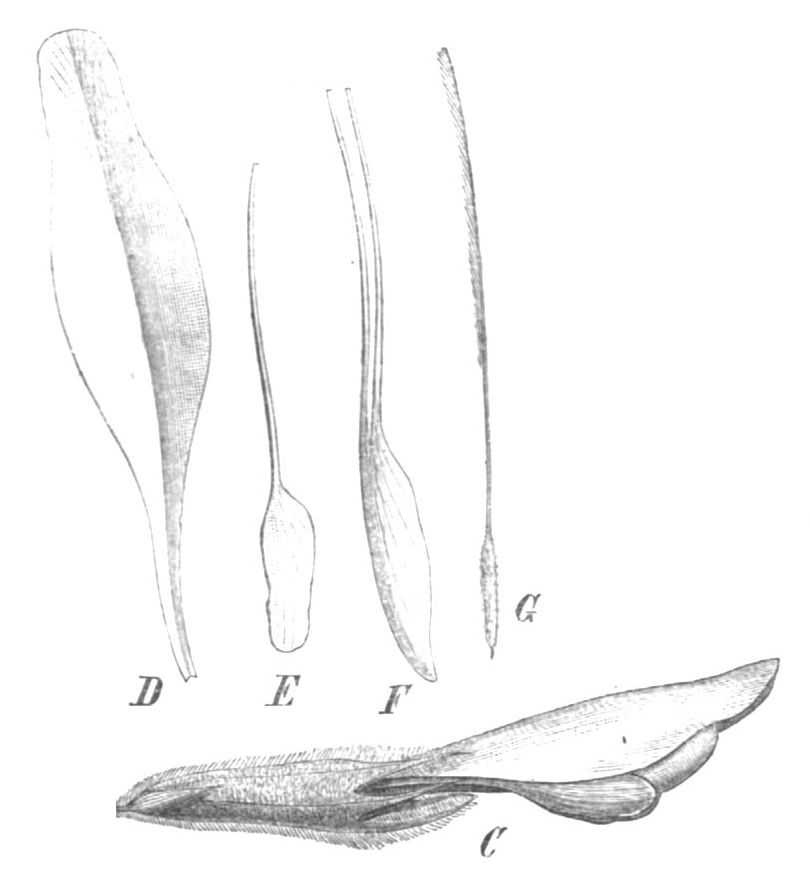
- Barbiera pinnata book illustration, 1891

Scientific classification
- Kingdom: Plantae
- Clade: Tracheophytes
- Clade: Angiosperms
- Clade: Eudicots
- Clade: Rosids
- Order: Fabales
- Family: Fabaceae
- Subfamily: Faboideae
- Tribe: Phaseoleae
- Subtribe: Clitoriinae
- Genus: Barbieria; DC. (1825)
- Species: B. pinnata

Binomial name
- Barbieria pinnata (Pers.) Baill. (1870)

Synonyms
- Barbieria maynensis Poepp. (1845); Barbieria polyphylla DC. (1825), nom. superfl.; Clitoria pinnata (Pers.) R.H.Sm. & G.P.Lewis (1991); Clitoria polyphylla Poir. (1811), nom. superfl.; Galactia pinnata Pers. (1807); Nauchea polyphylla Ledru ex J.T.Descourt. (1826), nom. superfl.

= Barbieria =

Genus of legumes

Barbieria is a genus of flowering plants in the legume family, Fabaceae. It contains a single species, Barbieria pinnata, a climber native to the tropical Americas, from southern Mexico through Central America and the Caribbean to northern South America.

It belongs to the Phaseoleae tribe of subfamily Faboideae.

== Description ==
Erect shrub 1–2.5 m tall, apically a scandent liana. Leaves imparipinnate, leaflets commonly 13–21, oblong to elliptic, 2.5–6 cm long x 1–2.5 cm wide, dark green with micro-uncinate pubescent above, pale with rufo appressed-pilose pubescence below. Inflorescences pseudoracemose, 4–24 cm long; peduncle rufo-pilose. Pedicels 305 mm in flower, 5–7 mm long in fruit. Bracts deltoid-lanceolate, subulate-acuminate, 3–8 mm. Bracteoles lanceolate, subulate-acuminate, dark greenish-yellow becoming reddish-orange, 7-11mm long x 2–3 mm wide. Flowers resupinate papilionaceous, red, 4.5–6 cm long. Calyx dark-vivid red, narrow infundibular, tube 16–22 mm long, 3–5 mm basally expanding to 6–8 mm wide at throat, lobes deltoid-ovate, subulate-acuminate, 8–12 mm long; persistent in fruit. Standard petal brilliant red, paler toward spotted center, blade oblong-lanceolate, 25–33 mm long x 14–17 mm wide, claw 21–24 mm long. Wing petals shorter than keel, red, flaring apically, blade elliptic-oblong 25–33 mm long x 14–17 mm wide, claw 21–24 mm long. Keel petals red, blade elliptic-oblong, weakly falcate, 17–23 mm long x 2.5–5 mm wide. Staminal sheath white, 36–44 mm long, free filaments 6–8 mm; anthers white. Ovary sessile, linear, 8–11 mm long, densely pubescent, trichomes white, ascending-asppressed, to 2 mm long; style 30–43 mm long, flattened, bearded lengthwise, exerted beyond stamens, geniculate 5–6 mm from distal end. Legume subsessile, linear, ecostate, valves puberulent-hirsute, strongly transversed-impressed between the seeds, spirally-twisting dehiscent. Seeds smooth, transverse oblong.], brownish-black, viscid,4-9 per pod. It flowered in March with fruits borne from April through December.

Barbieria is easily distinguishable from other members of subtribe Clitoriinae by red flowers, wing petals shorter than the keel, subulate0-acuminte bracts, bracteoles, stipules and calyx lobes, the dorsal calyx lobes free to near the base, and 15-21 leaflets.

== Range and habitat ==
Barbieria ranges from southwestern Mexico through Central America, the Caribbean islands, and northern South America to Bolivia and southeastern Brazil. It is present in the Amazonian, Andean, and Orinoco bioregions. In Colombia it ranges from 200 to 1140 meters elevation in the departments of Antioquia, Guaviare, Meta, and Vaupés.

Barbieria is found in moist soils in secondary growth, roadsides, riverine forests, forest edges or open areas with abundant sun, at elevations of 390–1000 m. Plant collectors often cited that the plant was observed rarely in the area sampled.

== Taxonomy ==
De Candolle's (1825) Barbieria DC is a monotypic legume genus of questionable affinities, historically having been synonymized with the genus Clitoria, and placed in several tribes, including its own. White (1980) treated Barbieria as a distinct genus in the Panamanian flora. Lackey (1981) concluded it was a member of the genus Clitoria. In addition, he was the first to correctly assign the genus to tribe Phaseoleae subtribe Clitoriinae Benth., with members bearing resupinate (inverted) flowers, a unique trait amongst legumes. Mabberley (1987) and Smith and Lewis (1991) reconfirmed Barbieria as a synonym of Clitoria. Species of Clitoria fall into three distinct groups based upon morphology, but one could conclude that they represent three distinct genera. Bentham (1858) concluded that Clitoria would be rendered more natural by retaining these groups together, treating them as section. Baker (1879) elevated two sections to subgenus Clitoria and subgenus Neurocapum (Desv.) Bak. Fantz (1979) agreed with Bentham and elevated the third section to subgenus Bracteria. Fantz (1996) resegregated Barbieria from Clitoria. He provided a taxonomic key to the genera (Bracteria, Centrosema, Clitoria, Clitoriopsis, Periandra) in subtribe Clitoriinae. He provided over thirty morphological character traits segregating Bracteria and Clitoria in Table 2.
