= Mysanthus =

Scientific classification
- Kingdom: Plantae
- Clade: Tracheophytes
- Clade: Angiosperms
- Clade: Eudicots
- Clade: Rosids
- Order: Fabales
- Family: Fabaceae
- Subfamily: Faboideae
- Subtribe: Phaseolinae
- Genus: Mysanthus; G.P.Lewis & A.Delgado (1994)
- Species: M. uleanus

Binomial name
- Mysanthus uleanus (Harms) G.P.Lewis & A.Delgado (1994)

Varieties
- Mysanthus uleanus var. dolichopsoides (Hoehne) G.P.Lewis & A.Delgado; Mysanthus uleanus var. uleanus

Synonyms
- Phaseolus uleanus Harms (1908)

Genus of legumes

Mysanthus uleanus is a species of flowering plant in the legume family, Fabaceae. It is a climbing herb endemic to eastern Brazil. It grows in seasonally-dry tropical wooded grassland, thorn scrub, rocky shrubland, and in degraded areas. It is the only described member of the genus Mysanthus, though there is a report of an undescribed species. The genus belongs to subfamily Faboideae.
