= Teyleria =

Scientific classification
- Kingdom: Plantae
- Clade: Tracheophytes
- Clade: Angiosperms
- Clade: Eudicots
- Clade: Rosids
- Order: Fabales
- Family: Fabaceae
- Subfamily: Faboideae
- Subtribe: Glycininae
- Genus: Teyleria; Backer (1939)

Species
- Teyleria barbata (Craib) J.A.Lackey ex Maesen; Teyleria stricta (Kurz) A.N.Egan & B.Pan; Teyleria tetragona (Merr.) J.A.Lackey ex Maesen

Genus of legumes

Teyleria is a genus of flowering plants in the legume family, Fabaceae. It includes three species of twining herbs native to Indochina, southern China, Hainan, the Philippines, Java, and the Lesser Sunda Islands. Typical habitat is seasonally-dry tropical forest, often on hillsides. It belongs to subfamily Faboideae.
