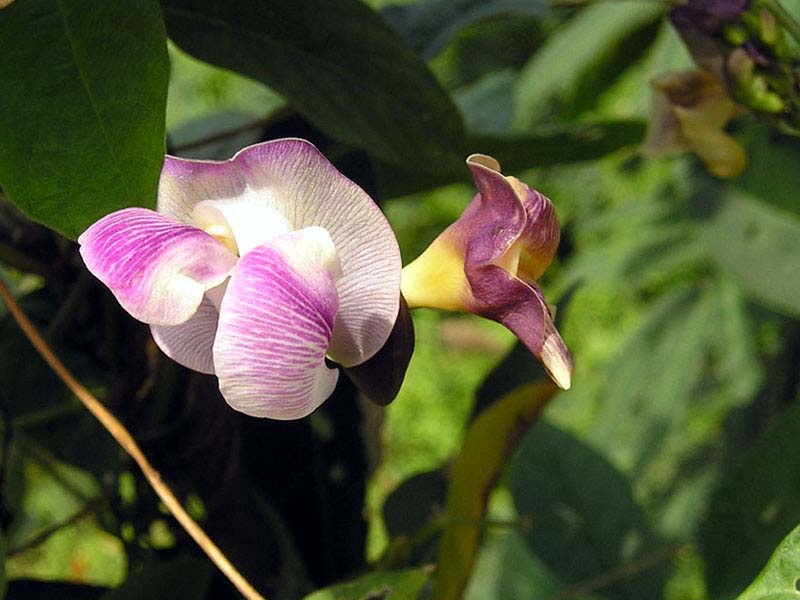
- Leptospron adenanthum

Scientific classification
- Kingdom: Plantae
- Clade: Tracheophytes
- Clade: Angiosperms
- Clade: Eudicots
- Clade: Rosids
- Order: Fabales
- Family: Fabaceae
- Subfamily: Faboideae
- Subtribe: Phaseolinae
- Genus: Leptospron (Benth.) A. Delgado

Type species
- Leptospron adenanthum (G. Mey.) A. Delgado

Species
- Leptospron adenanthum (G.Mey.) A.Delgado; Leptospron gentryi (Standl.) A.Delgado

Synonyms
- Phaseolus sect. Leptospron Benth., 1865; Vigna sect. Leptospron (Benth.) Maréchal et al., 1978

= Leptospron =

Genus of legumes

Leptospron is a small genus of flowering plants in the legume family, Fabaceae. It contains two species with a pantropical distribution. It belongs to the subfamily Faboideae. Species in this genus were formerly considered to belong to the genus Vigna.
