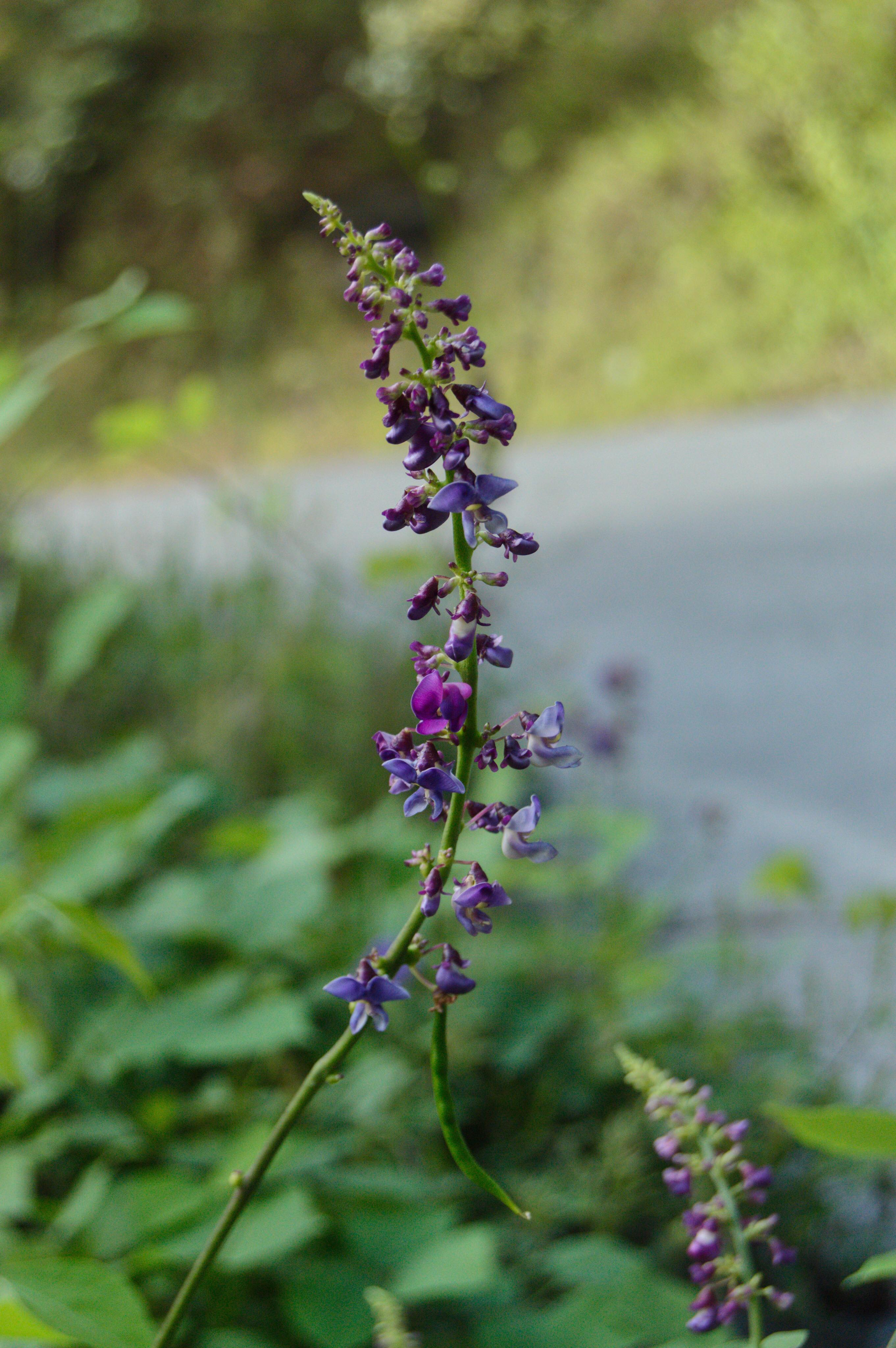
- Oxyrhynchus populneus

Scientific classification
- Kingdom: Plantae
- Clade: Tracheophytes
- Clade: Angiosperms
- Clade: Eudicots
- Clade: Rosids
- Order: Fabales
- Family: Fabaceae
- Subfamily: Faboideae
- Tribe: Phaseoleae
- Subtribe: Phaseolinae
- Genus: Oxyrhynchus; Brandegee (1912)

Species
- Oxyrhynchus papuanus (Pulle) Verdc.; Oxyrhynchus populneus (Piper) Norvell ex A.Delgado & E.Estrada; Oxyrhynchus trinervius (Donn. Sm.) Rudd; Oxyrhynchus volubilis Brandegee

Synonyms
- Monoplegma Piper (1920); Peekelia Harms (1920)

= Oxyrhynchus (plant) =

Genus of legumes

Oxyrhynchus is a small genus of flowering plants in the legume family, Fabaceae. It includes four species, three native to the tropical Americas from northern Mexico to Colombia, and one native to New Guinea, Maluku, and the Bismarck Archipelago. It belongs to the subfamily Faboideae. A key for the species in this genus has been published.
