= Neorautanenia =

Scientific classification
- Kingdom: Plantae
- Clade: Tracheophytes
- Clade: Angiosperms
- Clade: Eudicots
- Clade: Rosids
- Order: Fabales
- Family: Fabaceae
- Subfamily: Faboideae
- Subtribe: Glycininae
- Genus: Neorautanenia; Schinz

Species
- Neorautanenia ficifolia (Benth. ex Harv.) C.A.Sm.; Neorautanenia mitis (A. Rich.) Verdc.

Synonyms
- Bisrautanenia Kuntze (1903)

Genus of legumes

Neorautanenia is a genus of flowering plants in the legume family, Fabaceae. It includes two species of herbs of subshrubs native to sub-Saharan Africa. They inhabit seasonally-dry tropical open woodland, bushland, wooded grassland, and grassland, often on rocky outcrops. It belongs to the subfamily Faboideae. Neorautanenia mitis is a common perennial herb found in the middle-belt region of Nigeria, as well as other parts of western and central Africa. It has insecticidal properties and is used in traditional Rwandese medicine as treatment for scabies.
