= Diphyllarium =

Scientific classification
- Kingdom: Plantae
- Clade: Tracheophytes
- Clade: Angiosperms
- Clade: Eudicots
- Clade: Rosids
- Order: Fabales
- Family: Fabaceae
- Subfamily: Faboideae
- Genus: Diphyllarium; Gagnep. (1915)
- Species: D. mekongense

Binomial name
- Diphyllarium mekongense Gagnep. (1915)

Genus of legumes

Diphyllarium is a genus of flowering plants in the legume family, Fabaceae. It contains a single species, Diphyllarium mekongense, a shrub native to Vietnam, Laos, and Thailand. It belongs to subfamily Faboideae.
