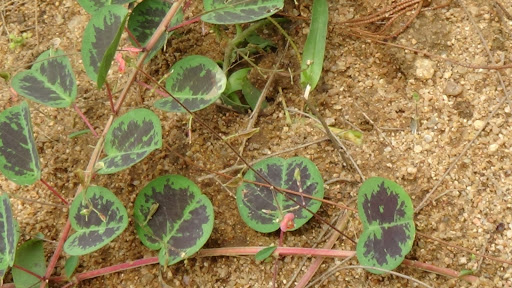

Scientific classification
- Kingdom: Plantae
- Clade: Tracheophytes
- Clade: Angiosperms
- Clade: Eudicots
- Clade: Rosids
- Order: Fabales
- Family: Fabaceae
- Subfamily: Faboideae
- Subtribe: Desmodiinae
- Genus: Eleiotis; DC.

Species
- Eleiotis rottleri Wight & Arn.; Eleiotis sororia (L.) DC.

Synonyms
- Oxydium Benn. (1840)

= Eleiotis =

Genus of legumes

Eleiotis is a genus of flowering plants in the legume family, Fabaceae. It belongs to subfamily Faboideae. It includes two species of annuals or perennials native to India, Sri Lanka and Myanmar.

- Eleiotis rottleri Wight & Arn.
- Eleiotis sororia (L.) DC.
