= Helicotropis =

Scientific classification
- Kingdom: Plantae
- Clade: Tracheophytes
- Clade: Angiosperms
- Clade: Eudicots
- Clade: Rosids
- Order: Fabales
- Family: Fabaceae
- Subfamily: Faboideae
- Subtribe: Phaseolinae
- Genus: Helicotropis; A.Delgado (2011)

Type species
- Helicotropis linearis (Kunth) A. Delgado

Species
- Helicotropis hookeri (Verdc.) A.Delgado; Helicotropis linearis (Kunth) A.Delgado; Helicotropis spectabilis (Standl.) A. Delgado

Genus of legumes

Helicotropis is a small genus of flowering plants in the legume family, Fabaceae. It belongs to the subfamily Faboideae. It includes three species of perennial climbing vines native to the tropical Americas, ranging from southern Mexico to northeastern Argentina. Species in this genus were formerly considered to belong to the genus Vigna.

- Helicotropis hookeri (Verdc.) A.Delgado – southern Brazil, northeastern Argentina, and Uruguay
- Helicotropis linearis (Kunth) A.Delgado – central Mexico to Paraguay and southern Brazil
- Helicotropis spectabilis (Standl.) A. Delgado – southern Mexico to Costa Rica
