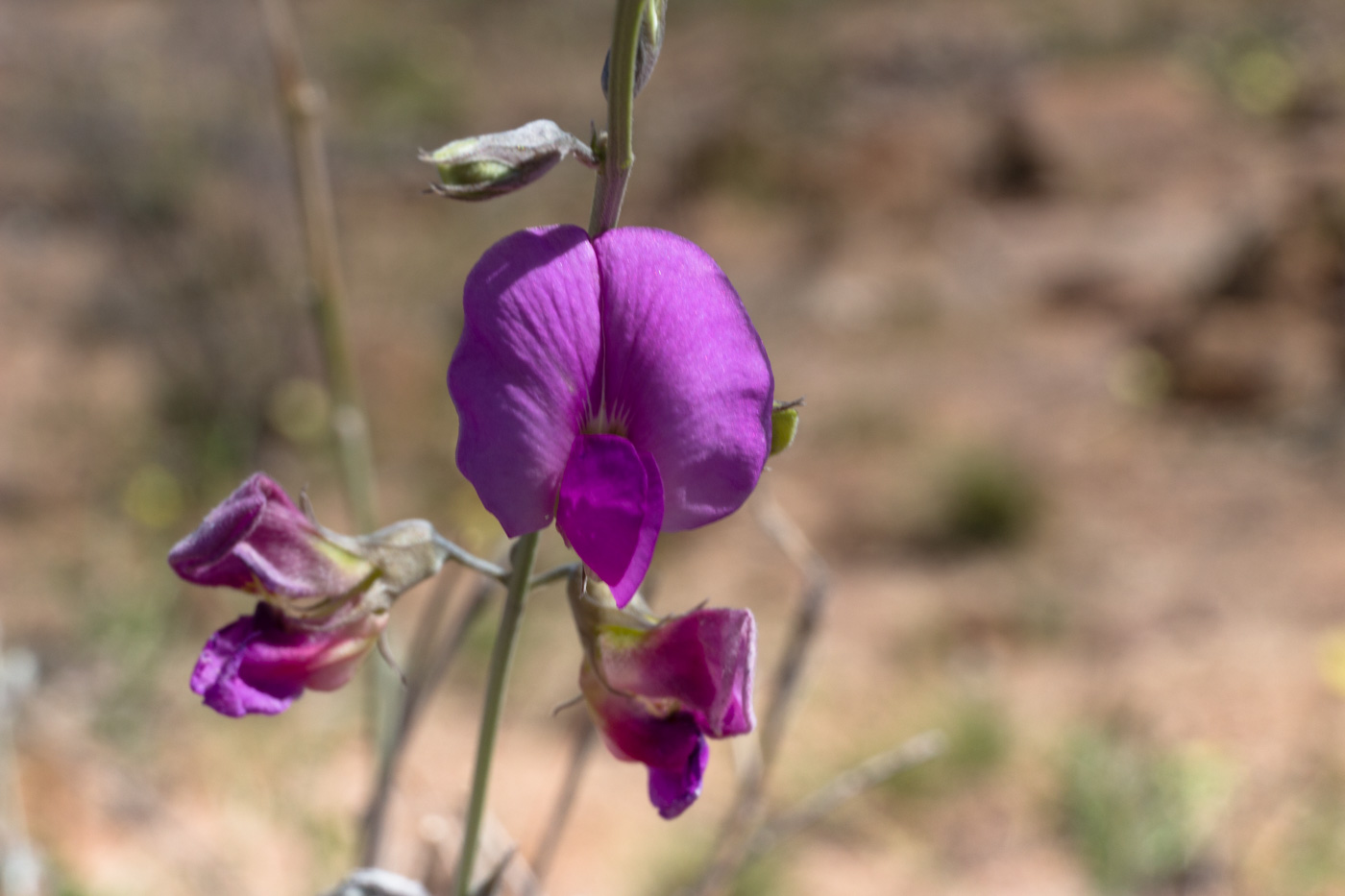
- Flowers of O. burchellii, Namibia

Scientific classification
- Kingdom: Plantae
- Clade: Tracheophytes
- Clade: Angiosperms
- Clade: Eudicots
- Clade: Rosids
- Order: Fabales
- Family: Fabaceae
- Subfamily: Faboideae
- Tribe: Phaseoleae
- Genus: Otoptera; DC. (1826)

Species
- 2; see text

= Otoptera =

Genus of legumes

Otoptera is a genus of flowering plants in the legume family, Fabaceae. It includes two species native to southern Africa and Madagascar. It belongs to the subfamily Faboideae. According to Moteetee and Van Wyk, the generic name Otoptera is derived from a characteristic spur at the base of each wing petal and is derived from the Greek oto meaning 'ear' and ptero meaning 'wing'. The proper words in ancient Greek for 'ear' and 'wing' are however oûs, genitive ōtós (οὖς, genitive ὠτός) and pterón (πτερόν). Members of the Otoptera genus can be identified by the spur at the base of the petals and spoon shaped styles with two distinct lips.

The genus contains two species; Otoptera burchellii which is native to areas of South Africa, Namibia, Botswana, and Zimbabwe and Otoptera madagascariensis which is native to parts of Madagascar.

== Species ==
- Otoptera burchellii DC.
- Otoptera madagascariensis R.Vig.
