= Herpyza =

Scientific classification
- Kingdom: Plantae
- Clade: Tracheophytes
- Clade: Angiosperms
- Clade: Eudicots
- Clade: Rosids
- Order: Fabales
- Family: Fabaceae
- Subfamily: Faboideae
- Genus: Herpyza; Sauvalle (1869)
- Species: H. grandiflora

Binomial name
- Herpyza grandiflora (Griseb.) C.Wright (1869)

Varieties
- Herpyza grandiflora var. grandiflora; Herpyza grandiflora var. stenophylla Urb.

Synonyms
- Teramnus gandiflorus Griseb. (1866)

Genus of legumes

Herpyza is a genus of flowering plants in the legume family, Fabaceae. It contains a single species, Herpyza grandiflora, an herbaceous perennial endemic to Cuba. It belongs to the subfamily Faboideae.

Two varieties are accepted:

- Herpyza grandiflora var. grandiflora
- Herpyza grandiflora var. stenophylla Urb.
