= Vatovaea =

Scientific classification
- Kingdom: Plantae
- Clade: Tracheophytes
- Clade: Angiosperms
- Clade: Eudicots
- Clade: Rosids
- Order: Fabales
- Family: Fabaceae
- Subfamily: Faboideae
- Genus: Vatovaea; Chiov. (1951)
- Species: V. pseudolablab

Binomial name
- Vatovaea pseudolablab (Harms) J.B.Gillett (1966)

Synonyms
- Phaseolus cibellii Chiov. (1915); Vatovaea biloba Chiov. (1951); Vigna pseudolablab Harms (1913)

Genus of legumes

Vatovaea is a genus of flowering plants in the legume family, Fabaceae. It is monotypic, being represented by the single species Vatovaea pseudolablab.

Vatovaea pseudolablab is a woody climber, growing 1.2 to 1.5 m. tall from an enormous woody tuber. The species is native to tropical eastern Africa and the southern Arabian Peninsula, ranging from Sudan to Uganda and Tanzania, and to Yemen and Oman. Typical habitats are semi-desert grassland and Acacia bushland, and occasionally on seasonally-wet grassland over clay soils, from 270 to 1350 meters elevation.
