= Cleobulia =

Scientific classification
- Kingdom: Plantae
- Clade: Tracheophytes
- Clade: Angiosperms
- Clade: Eudicots
- Clade: Rosids
- Order: Fabales
- Family: Fabaceae
- Subfamily: Faboideae
- Tribe: Diocleae
- Genus: Cleobulia; Mart. ex Benth. (1837)

Species
- Cleobulia coccinea (Vell.) L.P.Queiroz; Cleobulia crassistyla R.H.Maxwell; Cleobulia diocleoides Benth.; Cleobulia leiantha Benth.

Synonyms
- Cheobula Vell. (1829), orth. var.

Genus of legumes

Cleobulia is a genus of flowering plants in the family Fabaceae. It belongs to subfamily Faboideae. It includes four species of vines, lianas, or shrubs native to southwestern Mexico and Brazil. Habitats include Amazon rainforest, seasonally dry forest, and montane oak and pine forest.

- Cleobulia coccinea (Vell.) L.P.Queiroz – a climber native to eastern, southern, and west-central Brazil
- Cleobulia crassistyla R.H.Maxwell – a shrub native to southwestern Mexico (Guerrero)
- Cleobulia diocleoides Benth. – a climber native to southeastern Brazil (Minas Gerais)
- Cleobulia leiantha Benth. – a climber native to northern Brazil (Pará)
