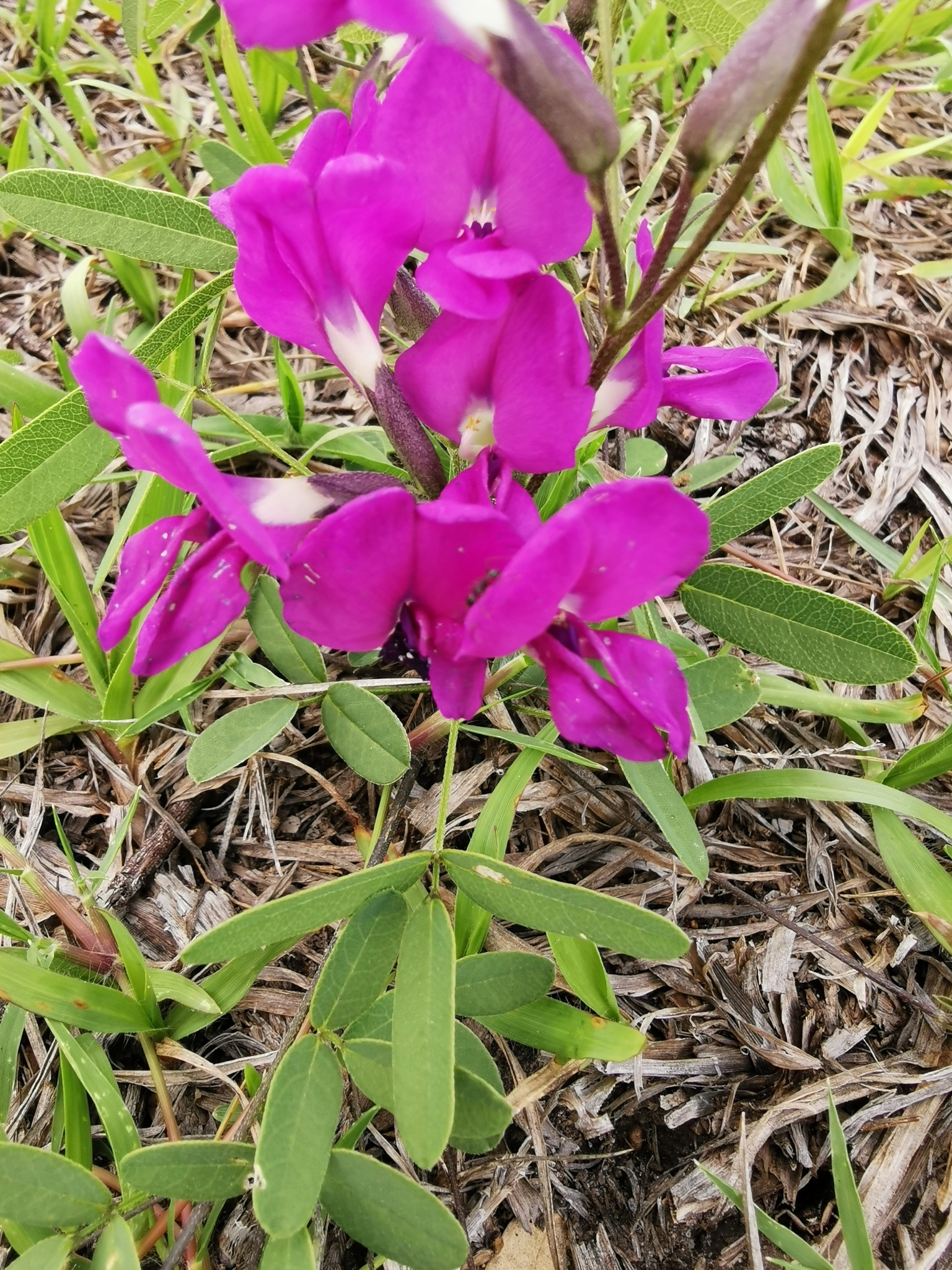
- Cologania angustifolia

Scientific classification
- Kingdom: Plantae
- Clade: Tracheophytes
- Clade: Angiosperms
- Clade: Eudicots
- Clade: Rosids
- Order: Fabales
- Family: Fabaceae
- Subfamily: Faboideae
- Subtribe: Glycininae
- Genus: Cologania; Kunth (1823)

Species
- 13; See text

= Cologania =

Genus of legumes

Cologania is a genus of flowering plants in the legume family, Fabaceae. It belongs to subfamily Faboideae. It includes 13 species of perennial climbing herbs which range from the southwestern United States through Mexico, Central America, and western (Andean) South America to northern Argentina. Most species are montane, and habitats include tropical to warm temperate montane forest, woodland, thicket, wooded grassland, and open bushland on mountain slopes.

== Species ==
The following species are recognised in the genus Cologania:

- Cologania angustifolia Kunth
- Cologania biloba (Lindl.) G.Nicholson
- Cologania broussonetii (Balb.) DC.
- Cologania capitata Rose
- Cologania cordata Fearing ex McVaugh
- Cologania grandiflora Rose
- Cologania hintoniorum B.L.Turner
- Cologania hirta (M.Martens & Galeotti) N.E.Rose
- Cologania obovata Schltdl.
- Cologania pallida Rose
- Cologania parviflora V.M.Badillo
- Cologania procumbens Kunth
- Cologania racemosa (B.L.Rob.) Rose
