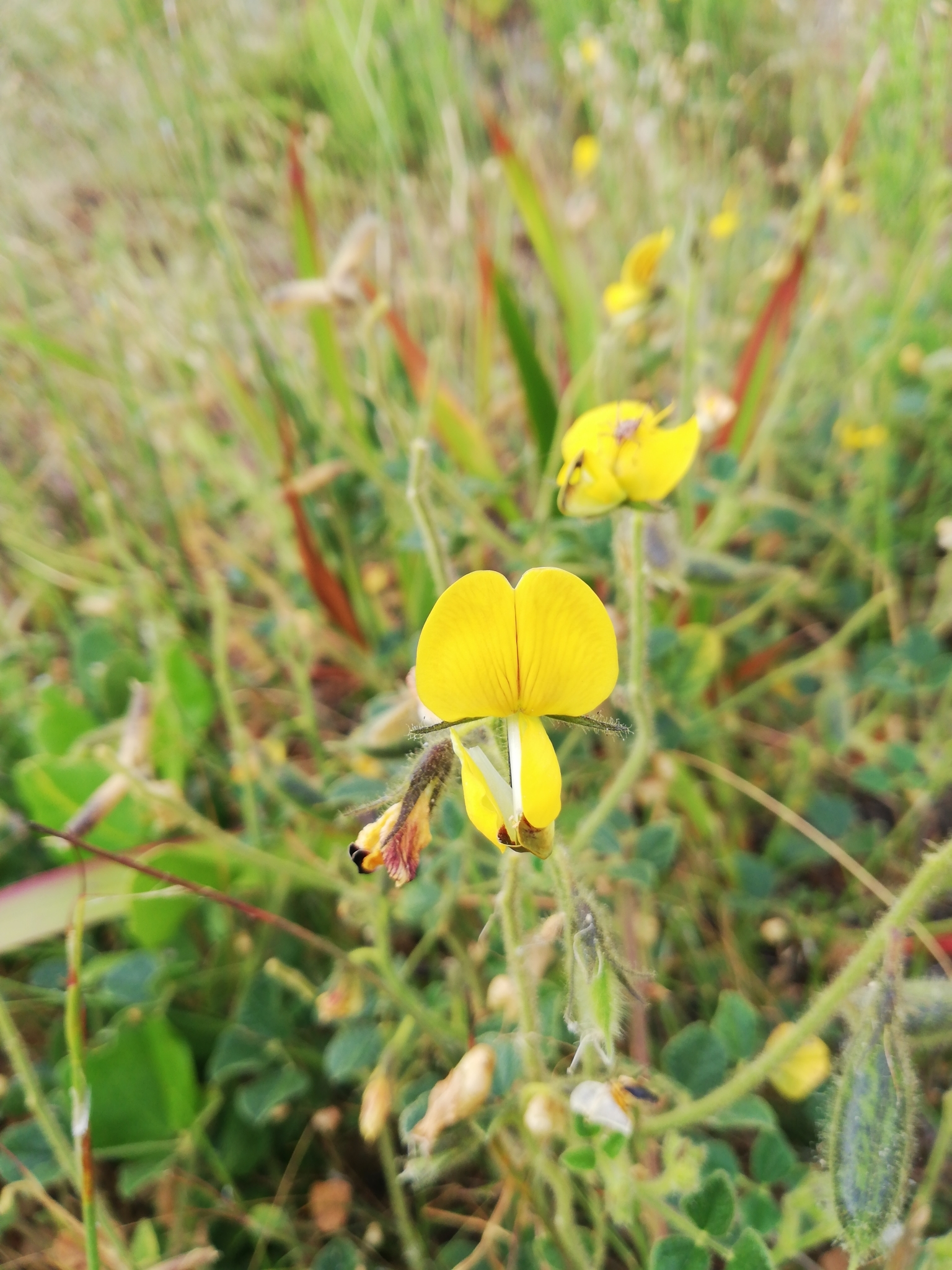

Scientific classification
- Kingdom: Plantae
- Clade: Tracheophytes
- Clade: Angiosperms
- Clade: Eudicots
- Clade: Rosids
- Order: Fabales
- Family: Fabaceae
- Subfamily: Faboideae
- Tribe: Phaseoleae
- Subtribe: Cajaninae
- Genus: Bolusafra; Kuntze (1891)
- Species: B. bituminosa

Binomial name
- Bolusafra bituminosa (L.) Kuntze (1891)

Synonyms
- (Genus): Fagelia Neck. ex DC. (1825), nom. illeg.; (Species): Crotalaria bituminosa (L.) Spreng. (1826); Crotalaria glycinea Lam. (1786); Dolichos hirtus DC. (1825), nom. illeg.; Fagelia bituminosa (L.) DC. (1825); Fagelia flexuosa Meisn. (1843); Glycine bituminosa L. (1753); Glycine viscosa Moench (1802), nom. superfl.; Rhynchosia rehmannii Schinz (1907)

= Bolusafra =

Genus of legumes

Bolusafra is a genus of flowering plants in the legume family, Fabaceae. It is monotypic, being represented by the single species Bolusafra bituminosa or tar pea. It is a subshrub native to the Cape Provinces of South Africa.
