= Spathionema =

Scientific classification
- Kingdom: Plantae
- Clade: Tracheophytes
- Clade: Angiosperms
- Clade: Eudicots
- Clade: Rosids
- Order: Fabales
- Family: Fabaceae
- Subfamily: Faboideae
- Genus: Spathionema; Taub. (1895)
- Species: S. kilimandscharicum

Binomial name
- Spathionema kilimandscharicum Taub. (1895)

Synonyms
- Vigna macrantha Harms (1901)

Genus of legumes

Spathionema kilimandscharicum is a species of flowering plant in the legume family, Fabaceae. It is a climbing or scrambling subshrub, 2 to 10 meters long, native to Kenya and Tanzania. It is the sole species in genus Spathionema. It belongs to subfamily Faboideae.

It grows in mixed deciduous bushland with Acacia spp., Terminalia orbicularis, Commiphora spp., Sesamothamnus spp. and others, and in Acacia semi-desert grassland, from 350 to 1470 meters elevation.
