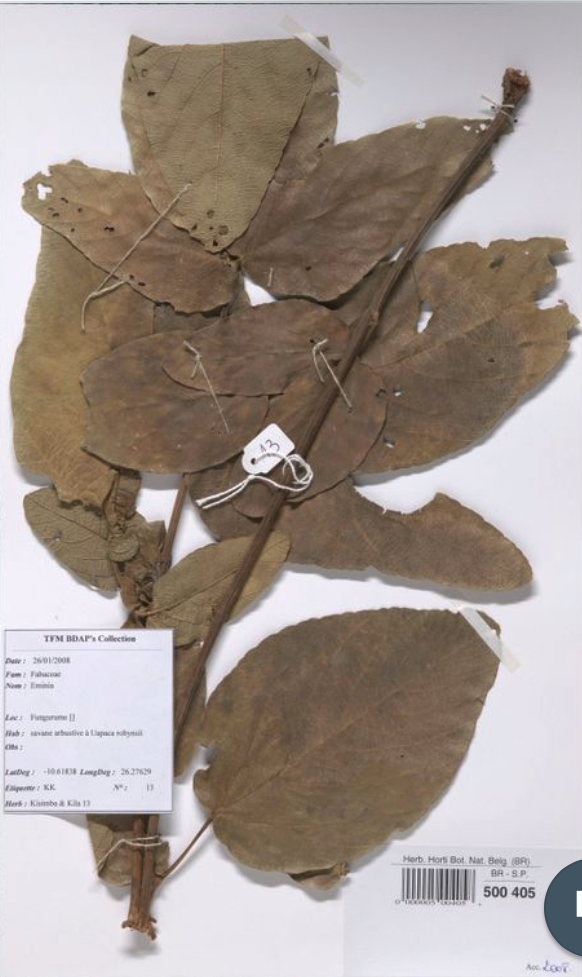

Scientific classification
- Kingdom: Plantae
- Clade: Tracheophytes
- Clade: Angiosperms
- Clade: Eudicots
- Clade: Rosids
- Order: Fabales
- Family: Fabaceae
- Subfamily: Faboideae
- Tribe: Phaseoleae
- Genus: Eminia; Taub. (1891)

Species
- four; see text

= Eminia (plant) =

Genus of legumes

Eminia is a genus of flowering plants in the legume family, Fabaceae. It belongs to the subfamily Faboideae. It contains the following species: It includes four species native to south-central and southern Africa, ranging from the Democratic Republic of the Congo and Tanzania to Angola, Botswana, and Mozambique.

- Eminia antennulifera (Baker) Taub.
- Eminia benguellensis Torre
- Eminia harmsiana De Wild.
- Eminia holubii (Hemsl.) Taub.
