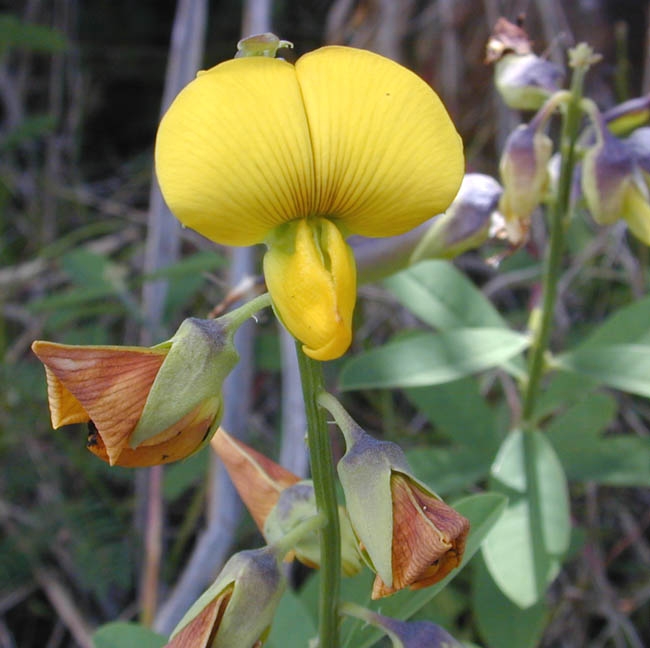
- Crotalaria retusa

Scientific classification
- Kingdom: Plantae
- Clade: Embryophytes
- Clade: Tracheophytes
- Clade: Angiosperms
- Clade: Eudicots
- Clade: Rosids
- Order: Fabales
- Family: Fabaceae
- Subfamily: Faboideae

Tribes
- Abreae; Amorpheae; Bossiaeeae; Brongniartieae; Cicereae; Crotalarieae; Dalbergieae; Desmodieae; Dipterygeae; Euchresteae; Fabeae; Galegeae; Genisteae; Hedysareae; Hypocalypteae; Indigofereae; Loteae; Millettieae; Mirbelieae; Phaseoleae; Podalyrieae; Psoraleeae; Robinieae; Sesbanieae; Sophoreae; Swartzieae; Thermopsideae; Trifolieae; Wisterieae
- Distribution of the Faboideae

Synonyms
- Aspalathaceae Martynov; Astragalaceae Berchtold & J. Presl; Ciceraceae W. Steele; Coronillaceae Martynov; Cytisaceae Berchtold & J. Presl; Dalbergiaceae Martinov; Daleaceae Berchtold & J. Presl; Galedupaceae Martynov; Geoffroeaceae Martius; Hedysaraceae Oken; Inocarpaceae Berchtold & J. Presl; Lathyraceae Burnett; Lotaceae Oken; Papilionatae Taub.; Papilionaceae Giseke; Papilionoideae (L.) DC. 1825; Phaseolaceae Martius; Robiniaceae Vest; Sophoraceae Berchtold & J. Presl; Tamarindaceae Martinov; Trifoliaceae Berchtold & J. Presl; Viciaceae Oken

= Faboideae =

Faboideae Temporal range: Late Paleocene – recent

Subfamily of plants

The Faboideae is the largest subfamily in the flowering plant family Fabaceae or Leguminosae. An alternative name for the subfamily, mostly used in older literature, is Papilionoideae, or Papilionaceae when this group of plants is treated as a family.

Widely known members of this subfamily include peanuts, peas, lentils, lupin, soybean, and other legumes. The butterfly-shaped flowers are characteristic of the Faboideae subfamily and root nodulation is very common. The species in this subfamily vary enormously in size, from the tiny Lupinus uncialis reaching only 2 cm in height, to Pterocarpus mildbraedii subsp. usumbarensis at up to 75 m (246 ft) height.

== Genera ==
The type genus, Faba, is a synonym of Vicia, and is listed here as Vicia.

- Abrus
- Acmispon
- Acosmium
- Adenocarpus
- Adenodolichos
- Adesmia
- Aenictophyton
- Aeschynomene
- Afgekia
- Aganope
- Airyantha
- Aldina
- Alexa
- Alhagi
- Alistilus
- Almaleea
- Alysicarpus
- Amburana
- Amicia
- Ammodendron
- Ammopiptanthus
- Ammothamnus
- Amphiodon
- Amorpha
- Amphicarpaea
- Amphimas
- Amphithalea
- Anagyris
- Anarthrophyllum
- Ancistrotropis
- Andira
- Angylocalyx
- Antheroporum
- Anthyllis
- Antopetitia
- Aotus
- Aphyllodium
- Apios
- Apoplanesia
- Apurimacia
- Arachis
- Argyrocytisus
- Argyrolobium
- Arthroclianthus
- Aspalathus
- Astragalus
- Ateleia
- Austrocallerya
- Austrodolichos
- Austrosteenisia
- Baphia
- Baphiastrum
- Baphiopsis
- Baptisia
- Barbieria
- Behaimia
- Bionia
- Bituminaria
- Bobgunnia
- Bocoa
- Bolusafra
- Bolusanthus
- Bolusia
- Bossiaea
- Bowdichia
- Bowringia
- Brongniartia
- Brya
- Bryaspis
- Burkilliodendron
- Butea
- Cadia
- Cajanus
- Calia
- Calicotome
- Callerya
- Callistachys
- Calobota
- Calophaca
- Calopogonium
- Calpurnia
- Camoensia
- Camptosema
- Campylotropis
- Canavalia
- Candolleodendron
- Caragana
- Carmichaelia
- Carrissoa
- Cascaronia
- Castanospermum
- Centrolobium
- Centrosema
- Chadsia
- Chaetocalyx
- Chamaecytisus
- Chapmannia
- Chesneya
- Chorizema
- Christia
- Cicer
- Cladrastis
- Clathrotropis
- Cleobulia
- Clianthus
- Clitoria
- Clitoriopsis
- Cochlianthus
- Cochliasanthus
- Codariocalyx
- Collaea
- Cologania
- Colutea
- Condylostylis
- Cordyla
- Coronilla
- Coursetia
- Craibia
- Cranocarpus
- Craspedolobium
- Cratylia
- Cristonia
- Crotalaria
- Cruddasia
- Cullen
- Cyamopsis
- Cyathostegia
- Cyclocarpa
- Cyclolobium
- Cyclopia
- Cymbosema
- Cytisophyllum
- Cytisopsis
- Cytisus
- Dahlstedtia
- Dalbergia
- Dalbergiella
- Dalea
- Dalhousiea
- Daprainia
- Daviesia
- Decorsea
- Dendrolobium
- Derris
- Dermatophyllum
- Desmodiastrum
- Desmodium
- Dewevrea
- Dichilus
- Dicraeopetalum
- Dillwynia
- Dioclea
- Diphyllarium
- Diphysa
- Diplotropis
- Dipogon
- Dipteryx
- Discolobium
- Disynstemon
- Dolichopsis
- Dolichos
- Dorycnium
- Droogmansia
- Dumasia
- Dunbaria
- Dussia
- Dysolobium
- Ebenus
- Echinospartum
- Eleiotis
- Eminia
- Endosamara
- Eremosparton
- Erichsenia
- Erinacea
- Eriosema
- Errazurizia
- Erythrina
- Etaballia
- Euchilopsis
- Euchlora
- Euchresta
- Eutaxia
- Eversmannia
- Exostyles
- Eysenhardtia
- Ezoloba
- Fairchildia
- Fiebrigiella
- Fissicalyx
- Flemingia
- Fordia
- Galactia
- Galega
- Gastrolobium
- Geissaspis
- Genista
- Genistidium
- Geoffroea
- Gliricidia
- Glycine
- Glycyrrhiza
- Gompholobium
- Gonocytisus
- Goodia
- Grazielodendron
- Guianodendron
- Gueldenstaedtia
- Halimodendron
- Hammatolobium
- Haplormosia
- Hardenbergia
- Harleyodendron
- Harpalyce
- Hebestigma
- Hedysarum
- Helicotropis
- Herpyza
- Hesperolaburnum
- Hippocrepis
- Hoita
- Holocalyx
- Hosackia
- Hovea
- Huangtcia
- Humularia
- Hymenocarpos
- Hymenolobium
- Hypocalyptus
- Indigastrum
- Indigofera
- Inocarpus
- Isotropis
- Jacksonia
- Kanburia
- Kennedia
- Kotschya
- Kummerowia
- Lablab
- +Laburnocytisus (Note: Not a true genus. It is a graft-chimera between Laburnum and Cytisus.)
- Laburnum
- Lackeya
- Ladeania
- Lamprolobium
- Lathyrus
- Latrobea
- Lebeckia
- Lecointea
- Lembotropis
- Lennea
- Lens
- Leobordea
- Leptoderris
- Leptodesmia
- Leptolobium
- Leptosema
- Leptospron
- Lespedeza
- Lessertia
- Leucomphalos
- Limadendron
- Liparia
- Listia
- Lonchocarpus
- Lotononis
- Lotus
- Luetzelburgia
- Lupinus
- Luzonia
- Maackia
- Machaerium
- Macropsychanthus
- Macroptilium
- Macrotyloma
- Maraniona
- Margaritolobium
- Marina
- Mastersia
- Mecopus
- Medicago
- Melilotus
- Melliniella
- Melolobium
- Microcharis
- Mildbraediodendron
- Millettia
- Mirbelia
- Monopteryx
- Mucuna
- Muellera
- Muelleranthus
- Mundulea
- Myrocarpus
- Myrospermum
- Myroxylon
- Mysanthus
- Nanhaia
- Neocollettia
- Neoharmsia
- Neonotonia
- Neorautanenia
- Neorudolphia
- Nephrodesmus
- Nesphostylis
- Nissolia
- Nogra
- Oberholzeria
- Olneya
- Onobrychis
- Ononis
- Ophrestia
- Orbexilum
- Oreophysa
- Ormocarpopsis
- Ormocarpum
- Ormosia
- Orphanodendron
- Ornithopus
- Oryxis
- Ostryocarpus
- Otholobium
- Otoptera
- Ottleya
- Oxylobium
- Oxyrhynchus
- Oxytropis
- Pachyrhizus
- Padbruggea
- Panurea
- Paracalyx
- Paragoodia
- Paramachaerium
- Parochetus
- Parryella
- Pearsonia
- Pediomelum
- Pedleya
- Periandra
- Pericopsis
- Petaladenium
- Peteria
- Petteria
- Phaseolus
- Phylacium
- Phyllodium
- Phyllota
- Phylloxylon
- Physostigma
- Pickeringia
- Pictetia
- Piptanthus
- Piscidia
- Pisum
- Plagiocarpus
- Platycelyphium
- Platycyamus
- Platylobium
- Platymiscium
- Platypodium
- Platysepalum
- Podalyria
- Podocytisus
- Podolobium
- Poecilanthe
- Poiretia
- Poitea
- Polhillia
- Polhillides
- Pongamiopsis
- Pseudarthria
- Pseudeminia
- Pseudoeriosema
- Pseudovigna
- Psophocarpus
- Psoralea
- Psorothamnus
- Pterocarpus
- Pterodon
- Ptycholobium
- Ptychosema
- Pueraria
- Pultenaea
- Pullenia
- Pycnospora
- Pyranthus
- Rafnia
- Ramirezella
- Ramorinoa
- Retama
- Rhodopis
- Rhynchosia
- Rhynchotropis
- Riedeliella
- Robinia
- Robynsiophyton
- Rothia
- Rupertia
- Sakoanala
- Salweenia
- Sarcodum
- Sartoria
- Schefflerodendron
- Scorpiurus
- Sellocharis
- Sesbania
- Shuteria
- Sigmoidala
- Sigmoidotropis
- Sinodolichos
- Smirnowia
- Smithia
- Soemmeringia
- Sophora
- Spartium
- Spathionema
- Spatholobus
- Sphaerolobium
- Sphaerophysa
- Sphenostylis
- Sphinctospermum
- Spirotropis
- Spongiocarpella
- Stauracanthus
- Staminodianthus
- Steinbachiella
- Stirtonanthus
- Stonesiella
- Streblorrhiza
- Strongylodon
- Strophostyles
- Stylosanthes
- Styphnolobium
- Swainsona
- Swartzia
- Sweetia
- Sylvichadsia
- Syrmatium
- Tabaroa
- Tadehagi
- Taralea
- Taverniera
- Templetonia
- Tephrosia
- Teramnus
- Teyleria
- Thermopsis
- Thinicola
- Tipuana
- Trifidacanthus
- Trifolium
- Trigonella
- Tripodion
- Trischidium
- Uleanthus
- Ulex
- Uraria
- Uribea
- Urodon
- Vandasina
- Vatairea
- Vataireopsis
- Vatovaea
- Vavilovia
- Vermifrux
- Verdesmum H. Ohashi & K. Ohashi 2012
- Vicia
- Vigna
- Viminaria
- Virgilia
- Vuralia
- Wajira
- Weberbauerella
- Whitfordiodendron
- Wiborgia
- Wiborgiella
- Wisteria
- Wisteriopsis
- Xanthocercis
- Xiphotheca
- Zollernia
- Zornia
- Zygocarpum

== Systematics ==
Modern molecular phylogenetics recommend a clade-based classification of Faboideae as a superior alternative to the traditional tribal classification of Polhill:

- Faboideae (Papilionoideae)
  - - ADA clade
      - Angylocalyceae
      - - Dipterygeae
        - Amburaneae
  - - - Swartzieae
        - Swartzioids
        - Atelioids
    - - Cladrastis clade
      - Meso-Papilionoideae
        - Exostyleae
        - Genistoids
          - Ormosieae
          - - Brongniartieae
            - Leptolobieae
            - Core genistoids
              - Camoensieae
              - - Sophoreae
                - - Podalyrieae
                  - - Crotalarieae
                    - Genisteae
        - Vataireoids
        - Andira clade
        - Dalbergioids
          - Amorpheae
            - Amorphoids
            - Daleoids
          - Dalbergieae
            - Adesmia clade
            - - Dalbergia clade
              - Pterocarpus clade
        - Old World clade
          - Baphieae
          - NPAAA clade
            - - Hypocalypteae
              - Mirbelioids
            - - - Indigofereae
                - Millettioids
                  - Barbierieae (Clitoriinae clade)
                  - - Core millettioids
                      - Abreae
                      - - Millettieae
                        - Diocleae
                    - Phaseoloids
                      - Kennediinae clade
                      - Desmodieae
                      - - Cajaninae clade
                        - - Erythrininae clade
                          - - Psoraleeae
                            - Phaseoleae clade
              - Hologalegina (=galegoids)
                - Robinioids
                  - Loteae
                  - - Sesbanieae
                    - Robinieae
                - IRLC
                  - Wisterieae
                  - - Fabeae
                    - - Hedysareae
                      - Astragaleae

Note: Minor branches have been omitted.
