= Dumasia =

Scientific classification
- Kingdom: Plantae
- Clade: Tracheophytes
- Clade: Angiosperms
- Clade: Eudicots
- Clade: Rosids
- Order: Fabales
- Family: Fabaceae
- Subfamily: Faboideae
- Subtribe: Glycininae
- Genus: Dumasia; DC. (1825)

Species
- 10; see text

Genus of legumes

Dumasia is a genus of flowering plants in the legume family, Fabaceae. It belongs to the subfamily Faboideae. It includes ten species which range from sub-Saharan Africa to the Indian subcontinent, Indochina, China, Korea, Japan, Malesia, and New Guinea.

- Dumasia cordifolia Benth. ex Baker
- Dumasia forrestii Diels
- Dumasia henryi (Hemsl.) R.Sha & M.G.Gilbert
- Dumasia hirsuta Craib
- Dumasia kurziana (Predeep & M.P.Nayar) B.Pan bis, B.Tian & K.W.Jiang
- Dumasia prazeri Predeep & M.P.Nayar
- Dumasia truncata Siebold & Zucc.
- Dumasia villosa DC.
- Dumasia yunnanensis Y.T.Wei & S.K.Lee
- Dumasia zhangjiajieensis Y.K.Yang, L.H.Liu & J.K.Wu
