= P. nepalensis =

P. nepalensis may refer to:

- Pachykytospora nepalensis, a bracket fungus
- Pandanus nepalensis, an Old World monocot
- Parena nepalensis, a ground beetle
- Persicaria nepalensis, a flowering plant
- Phloeozeteus nepalensis, a ground beetle
- Phryno nepalensis, a tachina fly
- Phyllonorycter nepalensis, a Nepalese moth
- Piptanthus nepalensis, an Asian plant
- Plagiochila nepalensis, a liverwort with thin leaf-like flaps on either side of the stem
- Platambus nepalensis, a beetle native to the Palearctic
- Platynaspis nepalensis, a ladybird that feeds on scale insects
- Platynus nepalensis, a ground beetle
- Poecilosomella nepalensis, a small dung fly
- Potentilla nepalensis, a perennial plant
- Pristosia nepalensis, a ground beetle
- Pseudopostega nepalensis, a Nepalese moth
- Psilorhynchus nepalensis, a mountain carp
- Pterostichus nepalensis, a ground beetle
- Puccinia nepalensis, a plant pathogen
