= Coleophora albens =

Scientific classification
- Kingdom: Animalia
- Phylum: Arthropoda
- Class: Insecta
- Order: Lepidoptera
- Family: Coleophoridae
- Genus: Coleophora
- Species: C. albens

Binomial name
- Coleophora albens Falkovitsh, 1973

Species of moth

Coleophora albens is a moth of the family Coleophoridae. It is found in Turkestan and Uzbekistan.

The larvae feed on Astragalus and Ammodendron species. The length of the case is 13–16 mm. Larvae can be found on the beginning of June and (after diapause) from the end of April to May.
