= Sweetia =

Conservation status
- Least Concern (IUCN 3.1)

Scientific classification
- Kingdom: Plantae
- Clade: Tracheophytes
- Clade: Angiosperms
- Clade: Eudicots
- Clade: Rosids
- Order: Fabales
- Family: Fabaceae
- Subfamily: Faboideae
- Clade: Vataireoids
- Genus: Sweetia; Spreng. (1825), nom. cons.
- Species: S. fruticosa

Binomial name
- Sweetia fruticosa Spreng. (1825)

Varieties
- var. fruticosa Spreng.; var. hassleri Yakovlev; var. paraguariensis (Hassl.) Yakovlev

Synonyms
- Ferreirea Alemão; Acosmium lentiscifolium Vogel (1837), sensu auct.; Ferreirea spectabilis Allemão (1845); Ferreirea spectabilis f. fruticosa Chodat & Hassl. (1904); Ferreirea spectabilis var. paraguariensis Hassl. (1904); Sweetia fruticosa var. hassleri Yakovlev (1969); Sweetia fruticosa var. paraguariensis (Hassl.) Yakovlev (1969)

Genus of legumes

Sweetia fruticosa is a species of flowering plants in the legume family, Fabaceae. It is a tree native to eastern, southern, and west-central Brazil, Bolivia, Paraguay, and northeastern Argentina. It is the only member of the genus Sweetia (though some sources also include Sweetia atrata Mohlenbr.). It belongs to the subfamily Faboideae. It was traditionally assigned to the tribe Sophoreae, mainly on the basis of flower morphology; recent molecular phylogenetic analyses assigned Sweetia fruticosa into an informal, monophyletic clade called the "vataireoids".
