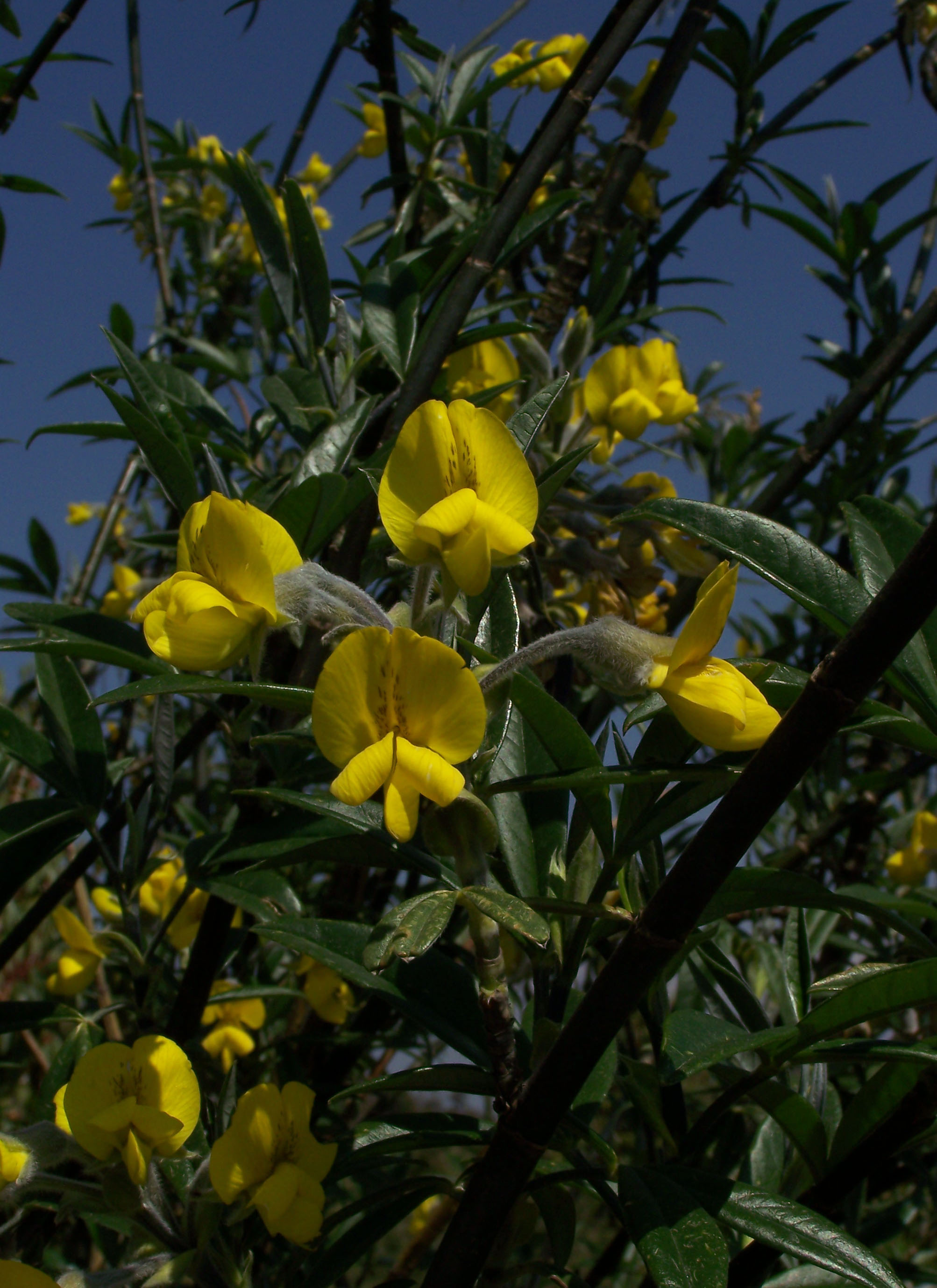
- Piptanthus nepalensis, Nepal

Scientific classification
- Kingdom: Plantae
- Clade: Embryophytes
- Clade: Tracheophytes
- Clade: Spermatophytes
- Clade: Angiosperms
- Clade: Eudicots
- Clade: Rosids
- Order: Fabales
- Family: Fabaceae
- Subfamily: Faboideae
- Tribe: Sophoreae
- Genus: Piptanthus; Sweet (1828)

Species
- Piptanthus nepalensis (Hook.) Sweet; Piptanthus tomentosus Franch.
- The range of Piptanthus.

= Piptanthus =

Genus of legumes

Piptanthus is a genus of flowering plants in the legume family, Fabaceae. It includes two species of shrubs native to the Himalayas, Tibet, Myanmar, and western China. They grow in montane grassland, thicket, and forest margins.

The genus belongs to subfamily Faboideae. It is most closely related to the genera Anagyris, Thermopsis (Asiatic spp.), and Vuralia.

== Species ==
Piptanthus comprises the following species:

- Piptanthus nepalensis is native to Burma, Bhutan, China, India, and Nepal. It is a morphologically variable shrub; for a detailed description, see Piptanthus nepalensis.
- Piptanthus tomentosus is endemic to China. It can be distinguished from P. nepalensis by the coating of reddish hairs on its fruit.
