= Coleophora singreni =

Scientific classification
- Kingdom: Animalia
- Phylum: Arthropoda
- Class: Insecta
- Order: Lepidoptera
- Family: Coleophoridae
- Genus: Coleophora
- Species: C. singreni

Binomial name
- Coleophora singreni Falkovitsh, 1973

Species of moth

Coleophora singreni is a moth of the family Coleophoridae. It is found in southern Russia, Turkestan and Uzbekistan.

The larvae feed on Astragalus and Ammodendron species. Larvae can be found at the beginning of June and (after diapause) from April to the beginning of May.
