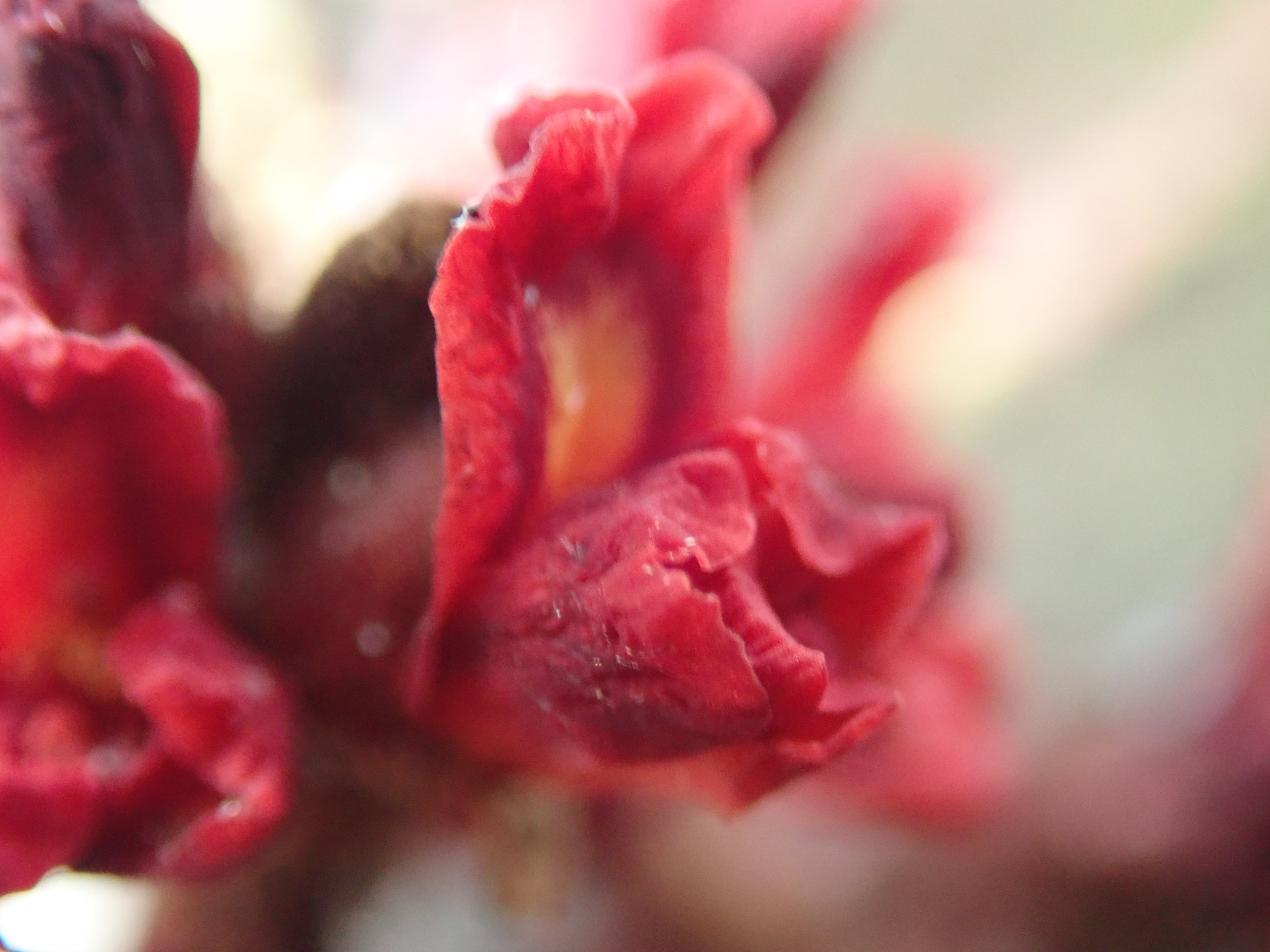
- Luetzelburgia andrade-limae in Brazil

Scientific classification
- Kingdom: Plantae
- Clade: Embryophytes
- Clade: Tracheophytes
- Clade: Spermatophytes
- Clade: Angiosperms
- Clade: Eudicots
- Clade: Rosids
- Order: Fabales
- Family: Fabaceae
- Subfamily: Faboideae
- Clade: Vataireoids
- Genus: Luetzelburgia; Harms

Type species
- Luetzelburgia auriculata (Allemão) Ducke

Species
- Luetzelburgia amazonica D. Cardoso et al.; Luetzelburgia andina D. Cardoso et al.; Luetzelburgia andrade-limae H. C. Lima; Luetzelburgia auriculata (Allemão) Ducke; Luetzelburgia bahiensis Yakovlev; Luetzelburgia guaissara Toledo; Luetzelburgia guianensis D. Cardoso et al.; Luetzelburgia harleyi D. Cardoso et al.; Luetzelburgia jacana D.B.O.S.Cardoso; Luetzelburgia neurocarpa D. Cardoso et al.; Luetzelburgia praecox (Harms) Harms; Luetzelburgia purpurea D. Cardoso et al.; Luetzelburgia sotoi D. Cardoso et al.; Luetzelburgia trialata (Ducke) Ducke
- Range of the sucupiras and angelims (genus Luetzelburgia)

= Luetzelburgia =

Genus of legumes

Luetzelburgia (common names include sucupira and angelim) is a genus of flowering plants in the legume family, Fabaceae. It includes 14 species of trees and shrubs native to Brazil, Bolivia, and Colombia. Typical habitat is seasonally-dry tropical lowland woodland and wooded grassland, and occasionally lowland rain forests. The genus belongs to the subfamily Faboideae. It was traditionally assigned to the tribe Sophoreae, mainly on the basis of flower morphology; recent molecular phylogenetic analyses assigned Luetzelburgia into an informal, monophyletic clade called the "vataireoids". Keys for the different species of Luetzelburgia have been published.
