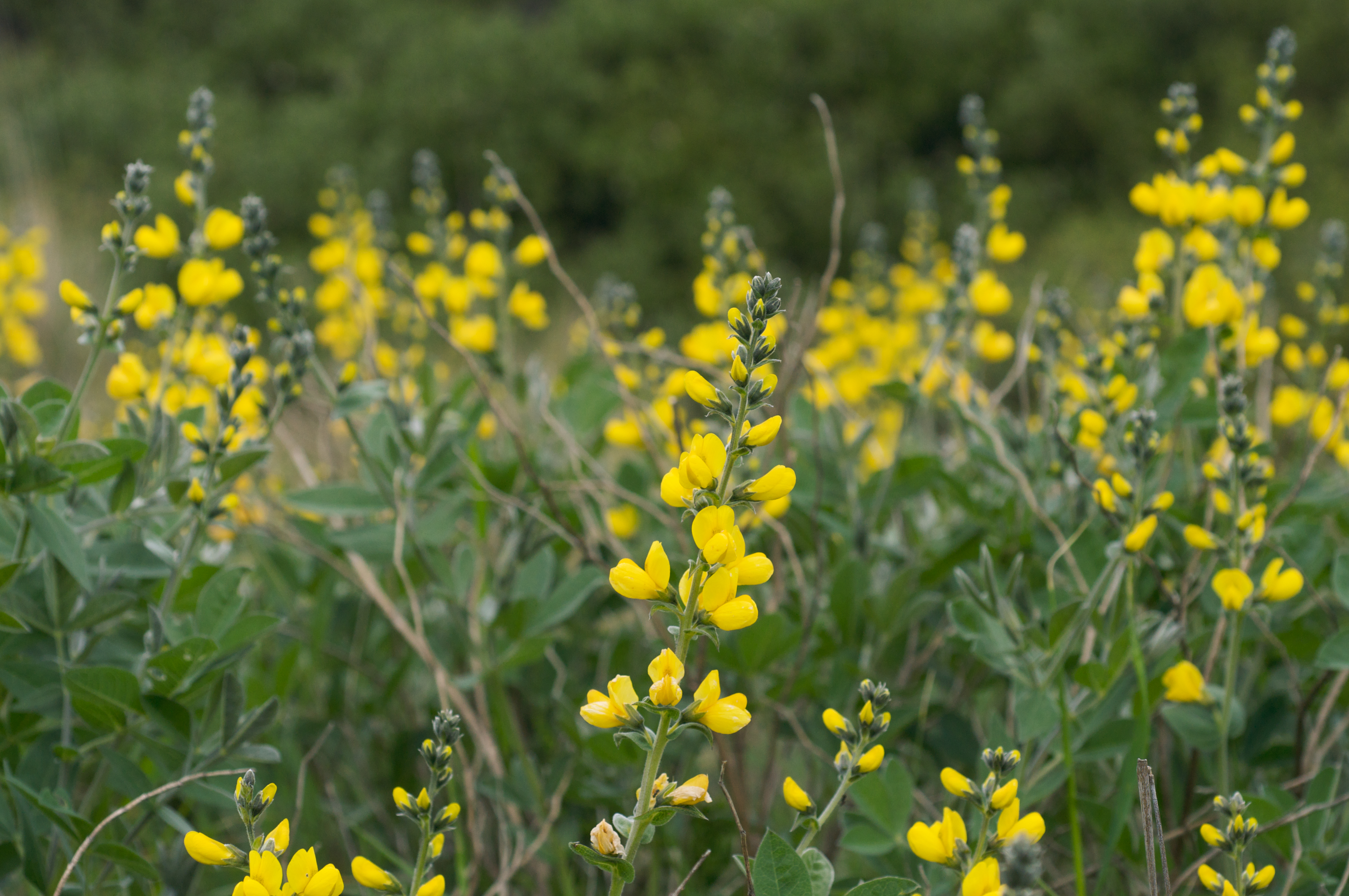

Conservation status
- Apparently Secure (NatureServe)

Scientific classification
- Kingdom: Plantae
- Clade: Embryophytes
- Clade: Tracheophytes
- Clade: Spermatophytes
- Clade: Angiosperms
- Clade: Eudicots
- Clade: Rosids
- Order: Fabales
- Family: Fabaceae
- Subfamily: Faboideae
- Genus: Thermopsis
- Species: T. californica

Binomial name
- Thermopsis californica S.Watson

= Thermopsis californica =

Species of legume

Thermopsis californica, known by the common name California goldenbanner, is a species of flowering plant in the legume family.

The plant is endemic to California, from regions in San Diego County and Southern California, to Modoc County and northeastern California.

It was previously included within the species Thermopsis macrophylla.

== Varieties ==
Varieties include:

- Thermopsis californica var. argentata — silvery false lupine; endemic to Northern California.
- Thermopsis californica var. californica — endemic to coastal California.
- Thermopsis californica var. semota — velvety false lupine; endemic to the Peninsular Ranges.
