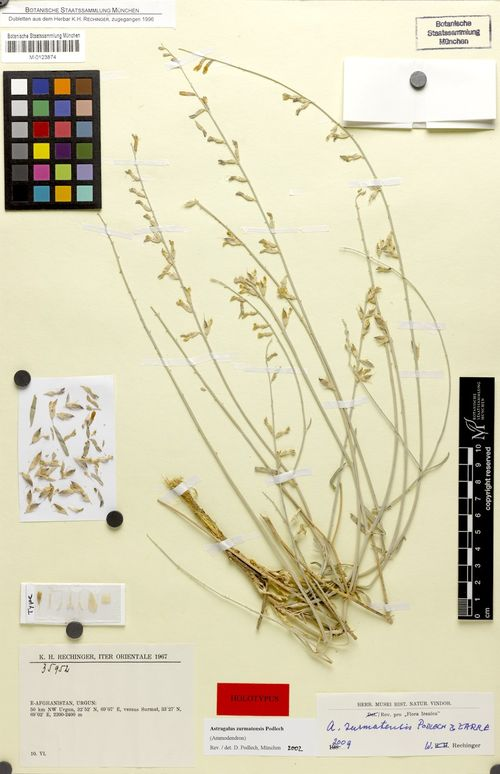

Scientific classification
- Kingdom: Plantae
- Clade: Tracheophytes
- Clade: Angiosperms
- Clade: Eudicots
- Clade: Rosids
- Order: Fabales
- Family: Fabaceae
- Subfamily: Faboideae
- Genus: Astragalus
- Species: A. zurmatensis

Binomial name
- Astragalus zurmatensis Podlech & Zarre

= Astragalus zurmatensis =

Species of flowering plant

Astragalus zurmatensis is a species of flowering plant in the family Fabaceae.

== Taxonomy ==
Astragalus zurmatensis was named by Dietrich Podlech and Shahin Zarre in 2003, based on specimens collected from Afghanistan in 1967, at an altitude of 2,200–2,400 metres (7,200–7,900 ft). It was named alongside several other species of Astragalus, and placed in Ammodendron, which the authors treated as a section of Astragalus.

== Distribution ==
Astragalus zurmatensis is native to the temperate biome of north-eastern Iran and eastern Afghanistan. The holotype was collected from Paktia Province, Afghanistan.

== Description ==
Astragalus zurmatensis is a subshrub. It grows up to 40 centimetres (1.3 ft) tall, and has white hairs. The stem has greyish-brown bark. The leaves are 2.5–4 centimetres (0.98–1.57 in) long, and have stems up to 5 millimetres (0.20 in) long. The plant has one or two pairs of leaflets, which are 15–30 millimetres (0.59–1.18 in) long, and 2–3 millimetres (0.079–0.118 in) wide.

The species has pale violet flowers, which are yellowish-brown when dry. The calyx is around 5 millimetres (0.20 in) long. The flower stalks are 7–12 centimetres (2.8–4.7 in) long. Unripe legumes are attched without stems.
