= Vuralia =

Scientific classification
- Kingdom: Plantae
- Clade: Tracheophytes
- Clade: Angiosperms
- Clade: Eudicots
- Clade: Rosids
- Order: Fabales
- Family: Fabaceae
- Subfamily: Faboideae
- Tribe: Sophoreae
- Genus: Vuralia; Uysal & Ertugrul (2014)
- Species: V. turcica

Binomial name
- Vuralia turcica (Kit Tan, Vural & Küçük.) Uysal & Ertugrul (2014)

Synonyms
- Thermopsis turcica Kit Tan, Vural & Küçük. (1983)

Genus of legumes

Vuralia is a monotypic genus belonging to subfamily Faboideae of the legume family, Fabaceae, endemic to the area surrounding lakes Akşehir and Eber in southwestern Türkiye. It has a chromosome number of 2n = 18. The single species Vuralia turcica was discovered by Turkish botanists in 1982 and is found only on the shores of lakes Akşehir and Eber. The species is critically endangered, being on the verge of extinction in its native range. The local names of this species translate as Eber yellow and yellow licorice. V. turcica was formerly placed in the genus Thermopsis.

== Description ==
V. turcica has a stout rhizome giving rise to top growth of upright habit 30–80 cm in height, bearing stems and trifoliate leaves clad in long, soft hairs and clustered yellow flowers in a terminal racemose inflorescence. The ovary is tripartite, each flower giving rise to three twisted pods, each of which, when ripe, is brown on the exterior and yellow within and approximately 25 mm in length.

== Taxonomy ==
The genus is named in honour of Turkish botanist Mecit Vural of Gazi University by Uysal and Ertuğrul, Vuralia being a Latinised form of his surname.

=== Affiliation within Fabaceae ===
The genus Vuralia is most closely related to the Asian species of the genus Thermopsis and the Old World genera Anagyris and Piptanthus: less so to the American species of Thermopsis which are closer to Baptisia (the genus Thermopsis is polyphyletic and merits splitting into separate Old and New World genera).

== Habitat loss ==
The habitat of V. turkica has sustained damage due to the desiccation of lakes Akşehir and Eber and the herb itself has been largely eradicated as a weed by farmers in the region. Furthermore, sexual reproduction has been impaired by insect damage to ripening seed before maturity. However, the plant is neither widely consumed by herbivores nor exploited for medicinal / pharmaceutical purposes by humans and is able to increase vegetatively by the spread of the fleshy rhizomes, these factors furnishing some defence against possible extinction.
