= Coleophora eucoleos =

Scientific classification
- Kingdom: Animalia
- Phylum: Arthropoda
- Class: Insecta
- Order: Lepidoptera
- Family: Coleophoridae
- Genus: Coleophora
- Species: C. eucoleos

Binomial name
- Coleophora eucoleos Falkovitsh, 1973

Species of moth

Coleophora eucoleos is a moth of the family Coleophoridae. It is found in Turkestan and Uzbekistan.

Adults are on wing in August.

The larvae feed on Astragalus and Ammodendron species.
