= Coleophora astragalorum =

Scientific classification
- Kingdom: Animalia
- Phylum: Arthropoda
- Class: Insecta
- Order: Lepidoptera
- Family: Coleophoridae
- Genus: Coleophora
- Species: C. astragalorum

Binomial name
- Coleophora astragalorum Falkovitsh, 1973

Species of moth

Coleophora astragalorum is a moth of the family Coleophoridae that can be found in Turkmenistan and Uzbekistan.

The larvae feed on Astragalus and Ammodendron species. Larvae can be found at the end of May and (after diapause) from the end of March to April.
