= Thermopsis mollis =

Conservation status
- Vulnerable (NatureServe)

Scientific classification
- Kingdom: Plantae
- Clade: Tracheophytes
- Clade: Angiosperms
- Clade: Eudicots
- Clade: Rosids
- Order: Fabales
- Family: Fabaceae
- Subfamily: Faboideae
- Genus: Thermopsis
- Species: T. mollis

Binomial name
- Thermopsis mollis (Michx.) M.A.Curtis ex A.Gray

Species of legume

Thermopsis mollis is a species of flowering plant in the legume family known by the common names Allegheny Mountain goldenbanner, soft bush pea, and soft-haired thermopsis. It is native to the southeastern United States from southern Virginia to northern Georgia.

This plant is a rhizomatous perennial herb with erect, branching stems growing up to 1.5 meters tall. The inflorescence is a raceme at the top of the stem. The fruit is a legume pod up to 7 centimeters long. The plant reproduces by seed and by sprouting from its woody rhizome.

This plant grows in the Appalachian Mountains and the Piedmont uplands.
