= Exostyles amazonica =

Scientific classification
- Kingdom: Plantae
- Clade: Embryophytes
- Clade: Tracheophytes
- Clade: Angiosperms
- Clade: Eudicots
- Clade: Rosids
- Order: Fabales
- Family: Fabaceae
- Subfamily: Faboideae
- Genus: Exostyles
- Species: E. amazonica

Binomial name
- Exostyles amazonica Yakovlev, 1979

Species of flowering plant

Exostyles amazonica is a species of Exostyles present in Suriname and North Brazil. It is a tree that grows primarily in a wet, tropical, biome. It was described in 1979 by Gennady Yakovlev.
