= Lecointea ovalifolia =

Conservation status
- Vulnerable (IUCN 2.3)

Scientific classification
- Kingdom: Plantae
- Clade: Tracheophytes
- Clade: Angiosperms
- Clade: Eudicots
- Clade: Rosids
- Order: Fabales
- Family: Fabaceae
- Subfamily: Faboideae
- Genus: Lecointea
- Species: L. ovalifolia

Binomial name
- Lecointea ovalifolia J. F. Macbr.

Species of Peruvian legume

Lecointea ovalifolia is a flowering plant of the family Fabaceae found exclusively in Peru.
