= Harleyodendron =

Scientific classification
- Kingdom: Plantae
- Clade: Tracheophytes
- Clade: Angiosperms
- Clade: Eudicots
- Clade: Rosids
- Order: Fabales
- Family: Fabaceae
- Subfamily: Faboideae
- Tribe: Exostyleae
- Genus: Harleyodendron; R.S.Cowan (1979)
- Species: H. unifoliolatum

Binomial name
- Harleyodendron unifoliolatum R.S.Cowan (1979)

Genus of legumes

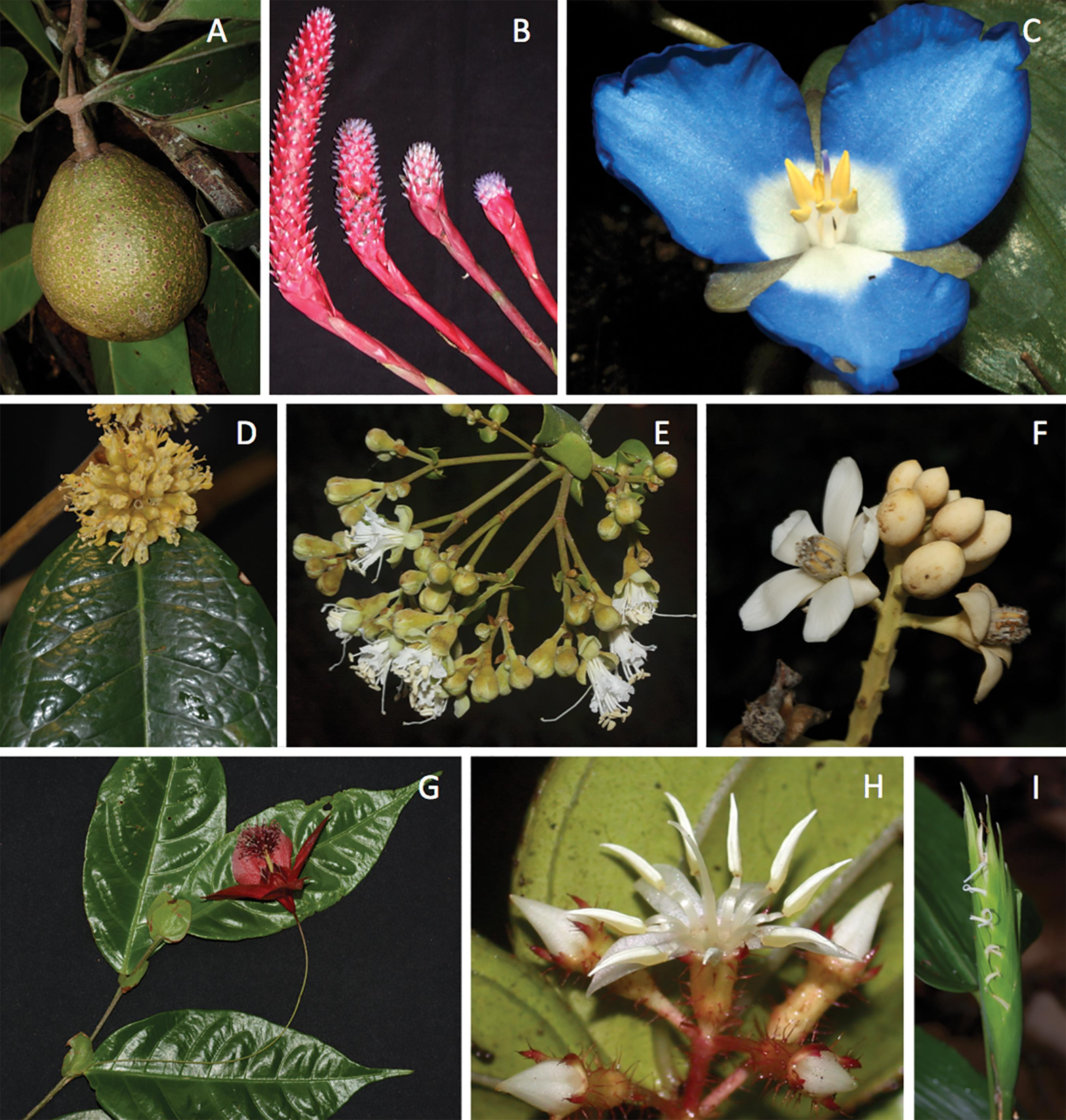
F. Harleyodendron unifoliolatum (Fabaceae)

Harleyodendron unifoliolatum is a species of flowering plant in the legume family, Fabaceae. It belongs to the subfamily Faboideae. It is the only member of the genus Harleyodendron. It is a tree endemic to northeastern Brazil.
