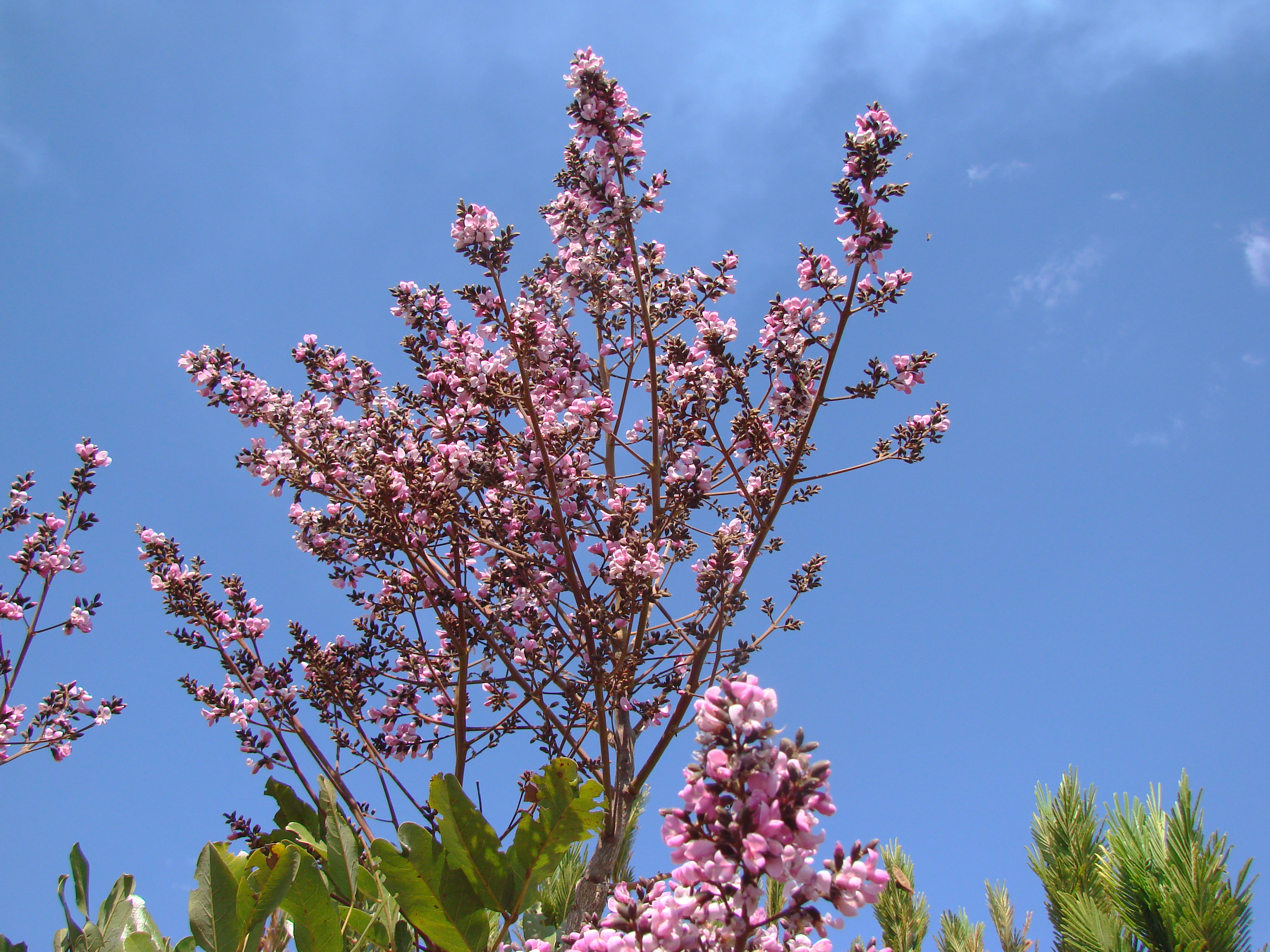
- Vatairea macrocarpa

Scientific classification
- Kingdom: Plantae
- Clade: Tracheophytes
- Clade: Angiosperms
- Clade: Eudicots
- Clade: Rosids
- Order: Fabales
- Family: Fabaceae
- Subfamily: Faboideae
- Clade: Meso-Papilionoideae
- Clade: Vataireoids (Pennington et al. 2001) Wojciechowski 2013

Genera
- Luetzelburgia Harms; Sweetia Spreng.; Vatairea Aubl.; Vataireopsis Ducke

Synonyms
- Sophoreae sensu Polhill, 1981 pro parte 5

= Vataireoids =

Clade of legumes

The vataireoids are an early-branching monophyletic clade of the flowering plant subfamily Faboideae (or Papilionaceae) that are mostly found in northern South America, primarily Brazil.

== Description ==
This clade is composed of four genera, two of which were traditionally assigned to the tribe Dalbergieae (Vatairea and Vataireopsis) and two of which were traditionally assigned to the tribe Sophoreae (Luetzelburgia and Sweetia), mainly on the basis of flower morphology. However, recent molecular phylogenetic analyses circumscribed these four genera into a strongly supported monophyletic clade. The name of this clade is informal and is not assumed to have any particular taxonomic rank like the names authorized by the ICBN or the ICPN. The clade is defined as:

"The most inclusive crown clade containing Sweetia fruticosa Spreng. 1825 and Vatairea guianensis Aubl. but not Andira inermis (W. Wright) DC., Zollernia ilicifolia (Brongn.) Vogel 1837, or Aldina insignis (Benth.) Endl. 1843."
