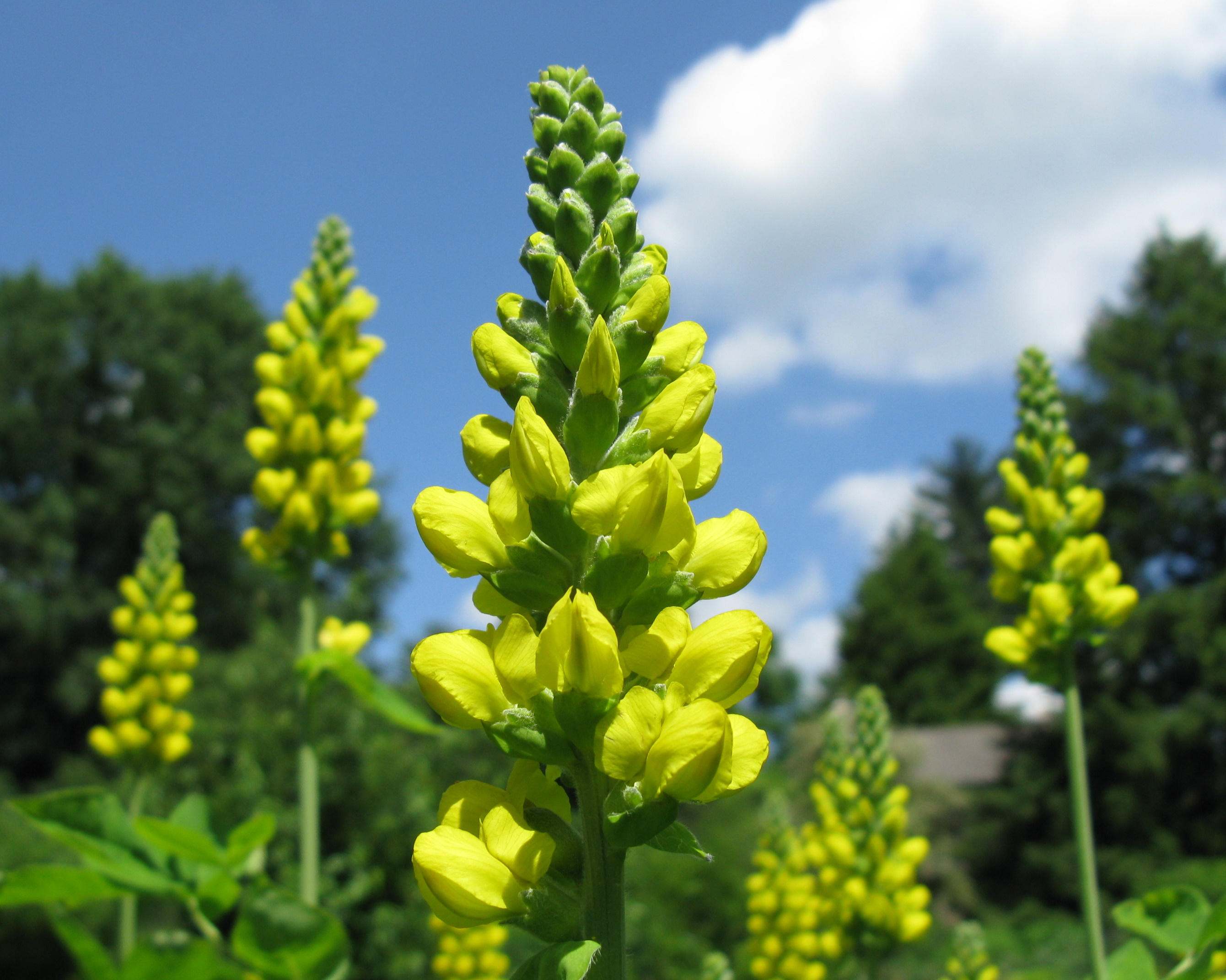

Conservation status
- Vulnerable (NatureServe)

Scientific classification
- Kingdom: Plantae
- Clade: Tracheophytes
- Clade: Angiosperms
- Clade: Eudicots
- Clade: Rosids
- Order: Fabales
- Family: Fabaceae
- Subfamily: Faboideae
- Genus: Thermopsis
- Species: T. villosa

Binomial name
- Thermopsis villosa (Walter) Fernald & B.G.Schub.

Synonyms
- Thermopsis caroliniana

= Thermopsis villosa =

Species of legume

Thermopsis villosa, commonly referred to as hairy false lupine, is a perennial herbaceous plant in the legume family. Its native range is in North America, in the southern Appalachian Mountains, principally in western North Carolina, eastern Tennessee, and northern Georgia. It is found elsewhere as an escape from cultivation. It occurs mainly in disturbed sites. NatureServe assigns Thermopsis villosa a global conservation rank of G3?, indicating that the species is probably vulnerable. Its rounded global rank is G3.
