= Exostyles glabra =

Scientific classification
- Kingdom: Plantae
- Clade: Tracheophytes
- Clade: Angiosperms
- Clade: Eudicots
- Clade: Rosids
- Order: Fabales
- Family: Fabaceae
- Subfamily: Faboideae
- Genus: Exostyles
- Species: E. glabra

Binomial name
- Exostyles glabra Vogel, 1837
- The distribution of Exostyles glabra

Species of plant

Exostyles glabra is a species of Exostyles present in Northeast Brazil and Southest Brazil. It is a tree that grows primarily in a wet, tropical, biome. It was described by Julius Rudolph Theodor Vogel in April or May 1837.
