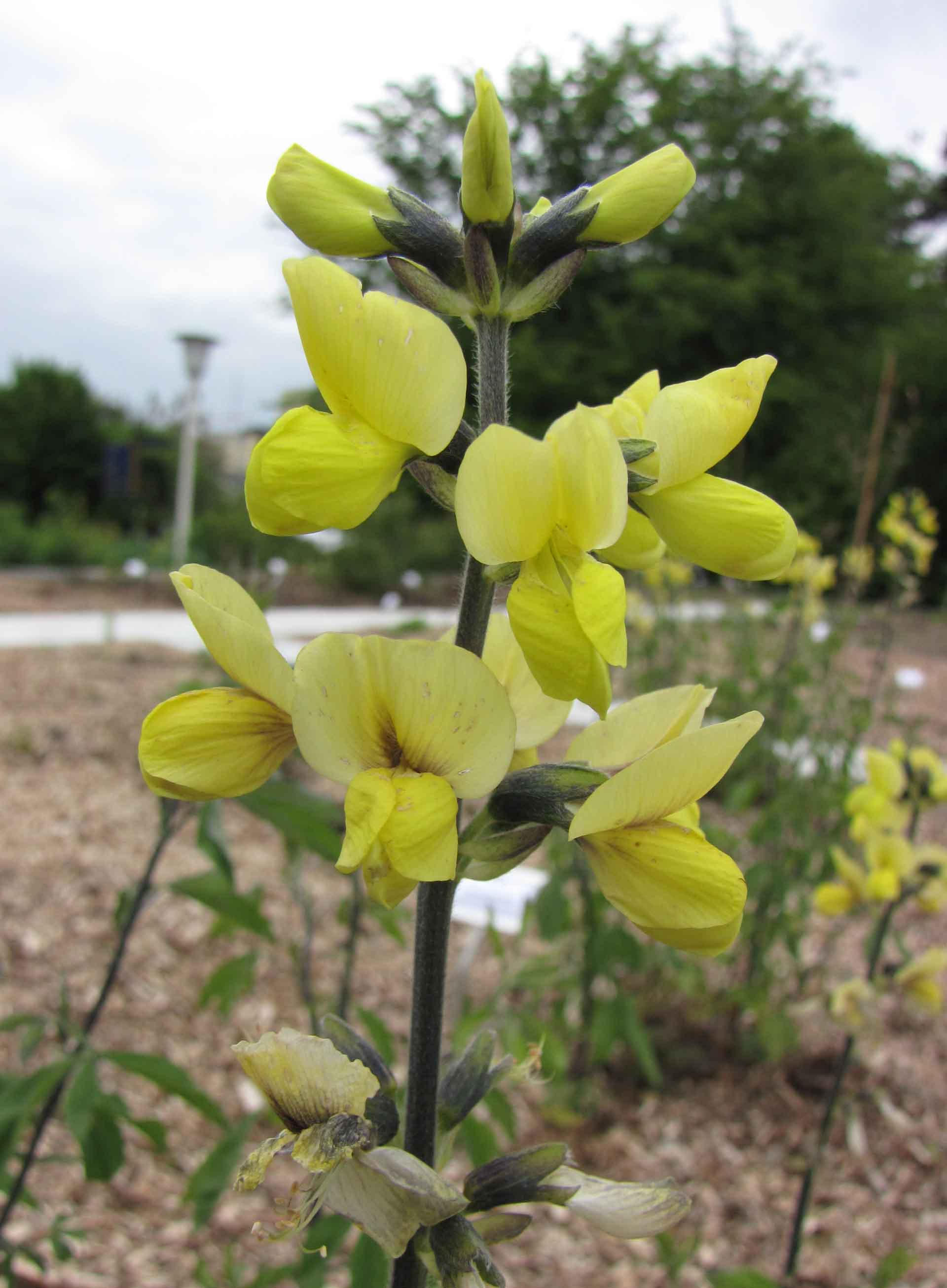

Scientific classification
- Kingdom: Plantae
- Clade: Embryophytes
- Clade: Tracheophytes
- Clade: Spermatophytes
- Clade: Angiosperms
- Clade: Eudicots
- Clade: Rosids
- Order: Fabales
- Family: Fabaceae
- Subfamily: Faboideae
- Genus: Thermopsis
- Species: T. lanceolata

Binomial name
- Thermopsis lanceolata R.Br.

Synonyms
- Thermopsis sibirica Czefr.

= Thermopsis lanceolata =

Species of plant

Thermopsis lanceolata, the tapered false lupin (or lupine), is a species of flowering plant in the legume family Fabaceae, native to Russia (Siberia), Kazakhstan, Mongolia, Nepal and China (Hebei Sheng, Gansu Sheng, Shanxi Sheng, Shaanxi Sheng, Qinghai Sheng, Nei Mongol Zizhiqu (s.)). Growing to 1 m (3.3 ft) tall and broad, this herbaceous perennial has grey-green leaves and erect tapering panicles of pale yellow, pea-like flowers in spring. It is closely related to the familiar lupins of gardens, but with a more bushy appearance.

The plant is tough and resilient, tolerating a wide range of growing conditions, but resents disturbance.

The Latin specific epithet lanceolata means 'spear-shaped', in reference to the leaves.

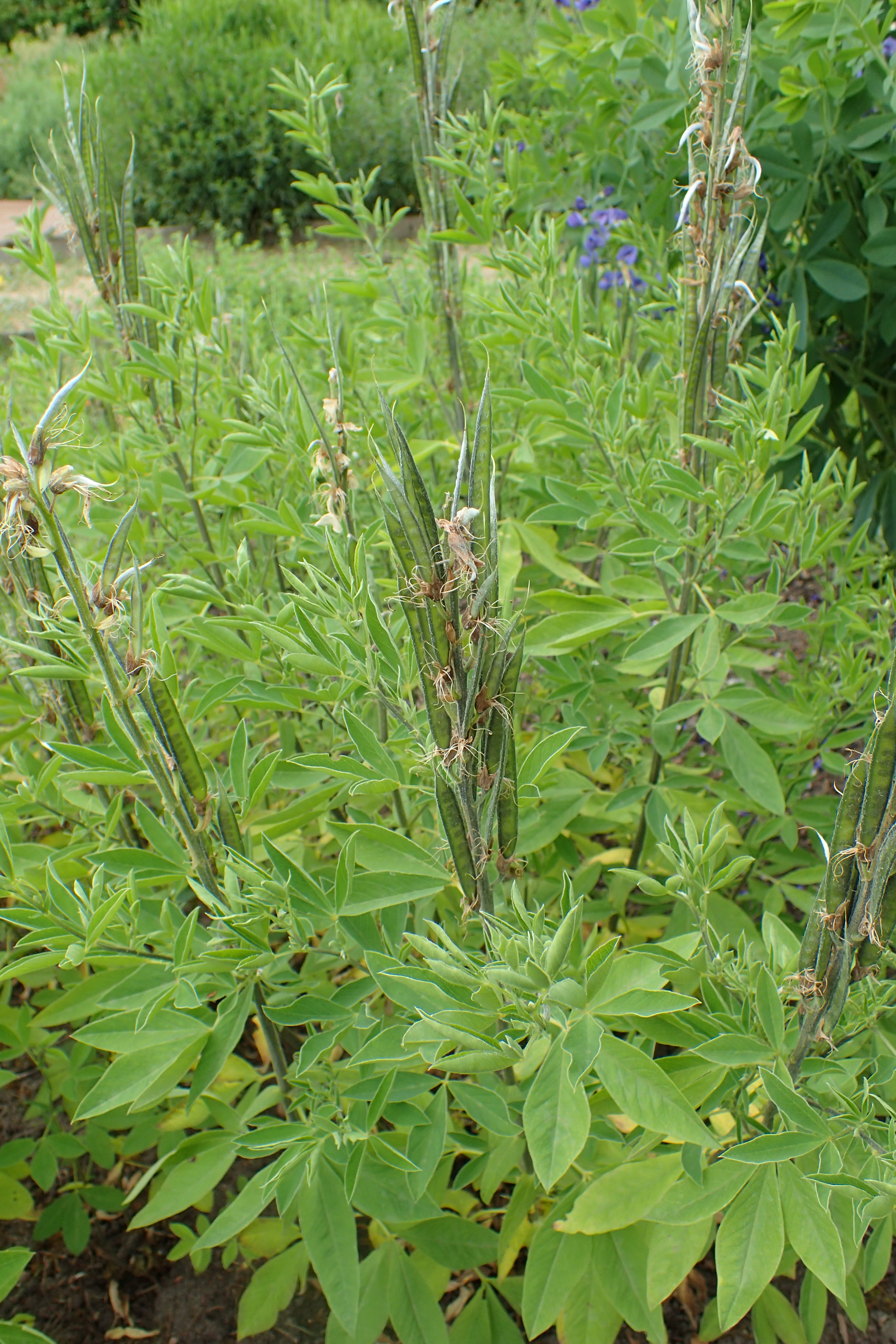

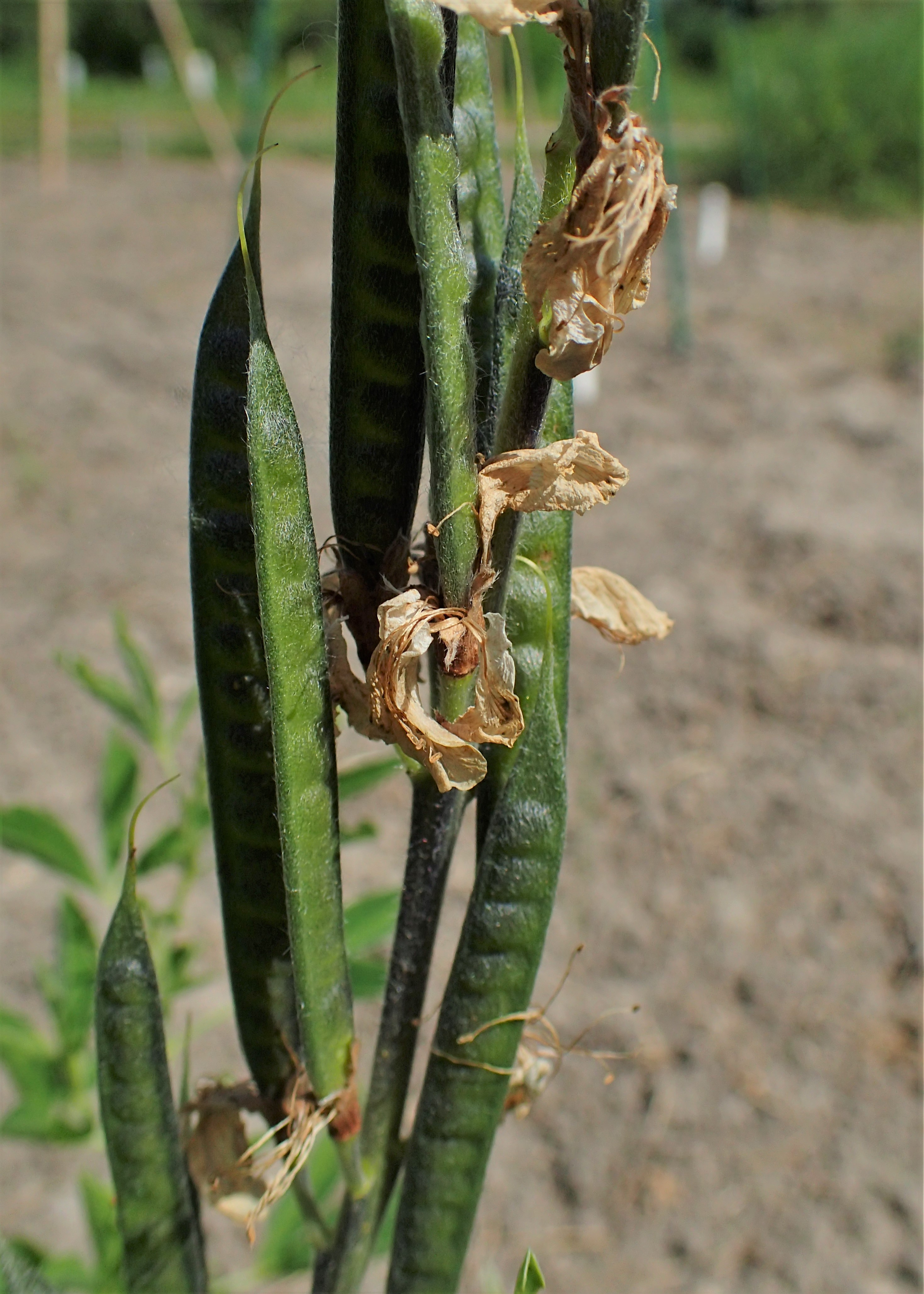

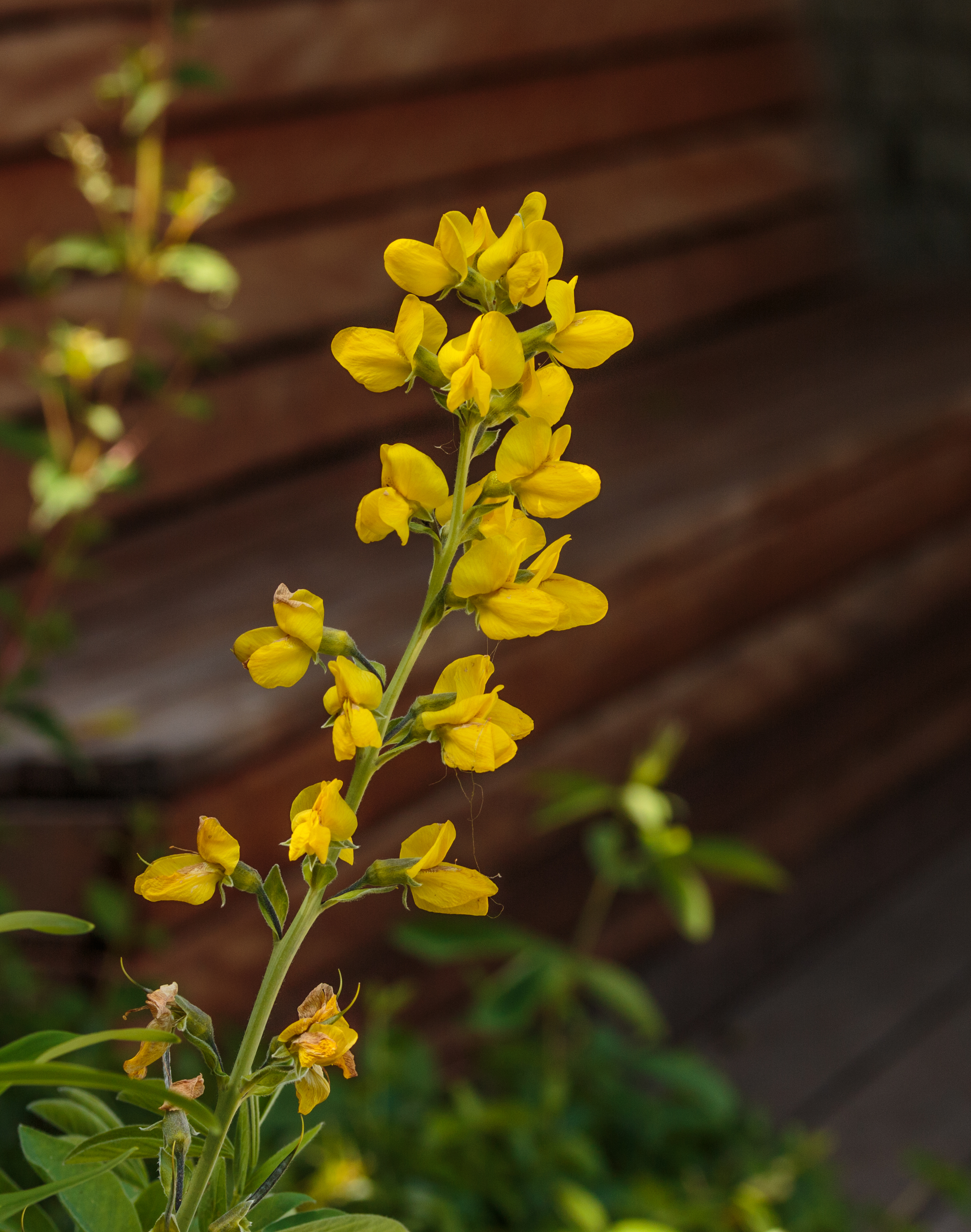

An alkaloid that is present in Thermopsis lanceolata is called Thermopsine [486-90-8].
