= Thermopsis robusta =

Conservation status
- Imperiled (NatureServe)

Scientific classification
- Kingdom: Plantae
- Clade: Tracheophytes
- Clade: Angiosperms
- Clade: Eudicots
- Clade: Rosids
- Order: Fabales
- Family: Fabaceae
- Subfamily: Faboideae
- Genus: Thermopsis
- Species: T. robusta

Binomial name
- Thermopsis robusta Howell

Species of flowering plant

Thermopsis robusta, commonly known as the robust false lupine or showy golden-banner, is a rare species of flowering plant in the legume family, Fabaceae. It is a perennial herb endemic to northern California and southwestern Oregon in the United States. It grows in open forest habitats, meadows, ridgelines, roadsides, and areas of shale or serpentine soils.

NatureServe assigns Thermopsis robusta a global conservation rank of G2, or imperiled. Roadside populations are particularly vulnerable to vehicles, construction work, and competition from invasives.
