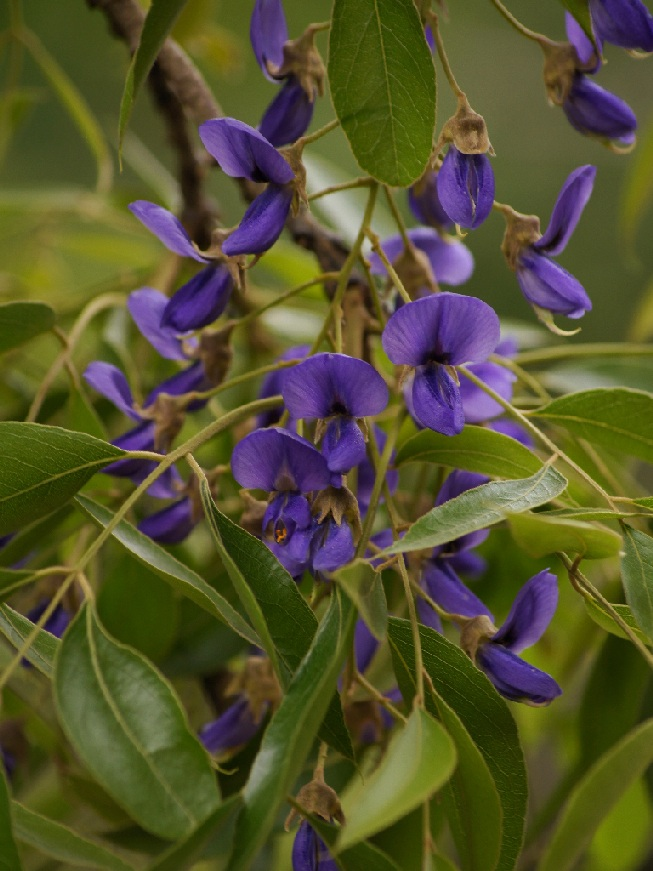

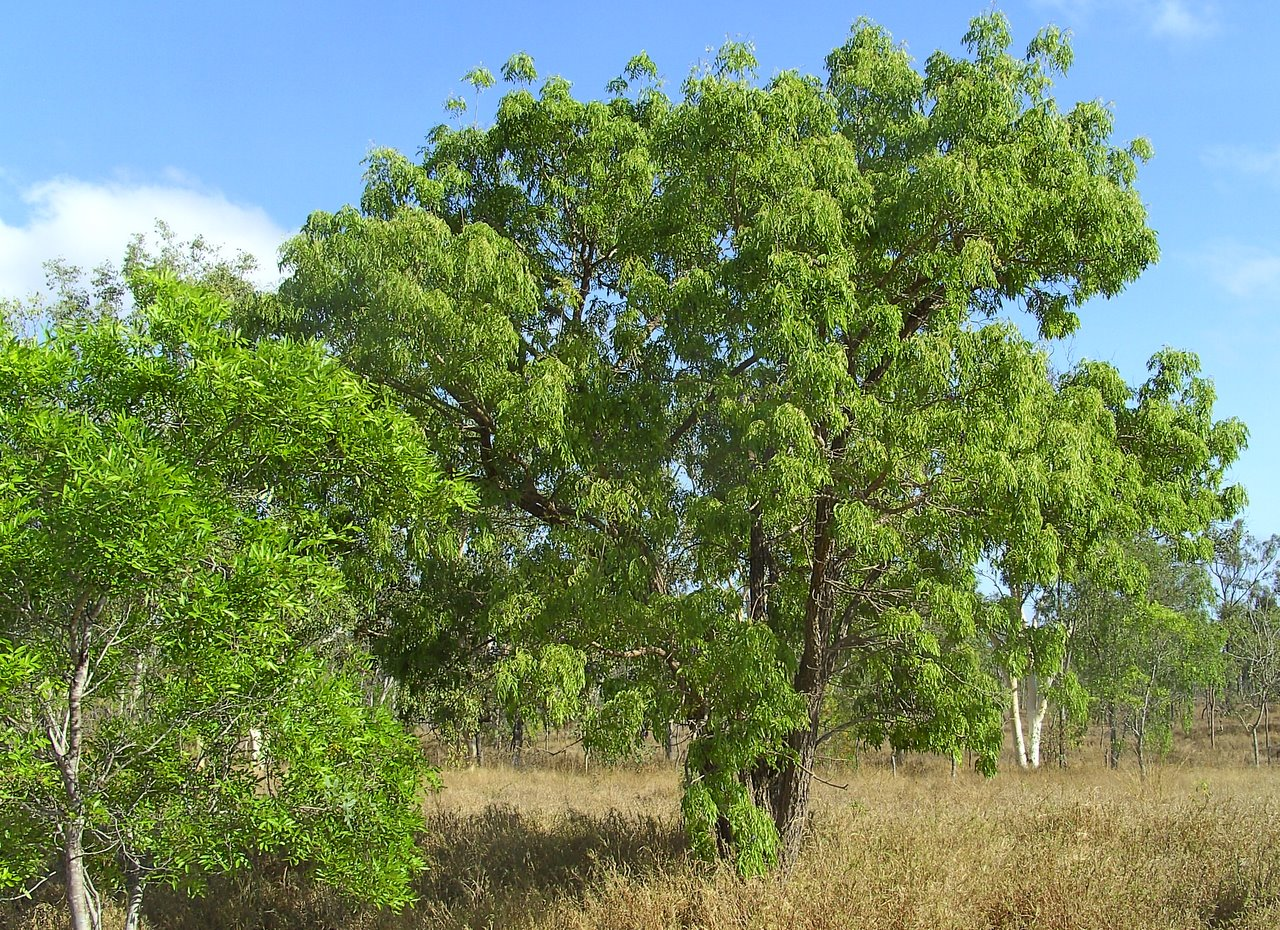
- Habit

Scientific classification
- Kingdom: Plantae
- Clade: Tracheophytes
- Clade: Angiosperms
- Clade: Eudicots
- Clade: Rosids
- Order: Fabales
- Family: Fabaceae
- Subfamily: Faboideae
- Tribe: Sophoreae
- Genus: Bolusanthus; Harms (1906)
- Species: B. speciosus

Binomial name
- Bolusanthus speciosus (Bolus) Harms (1906)

Synonyms
- Lonchocarpus speciosus Bolus (1889); Bolusanthus speciosus f. albescens Yakovlev (1972)

= Bolusanthus =

Genus of legumes

Bolusanthus speciosus (tree wisteria) is a species of flowering plants in the family Fabaceae. It belongs to the subfamily Faboideae. It is the only member of the genus Bolusanthus .

== Description ==
It is a small deciduous tree, which can grow up to 7 m (23 ft) tall. It has black, fissured rough bark and also drooping branches. Between September and October, when the tree has no leaves, it begins to bloom, with lilac blue flowers. Later it produces a seed capsule, the grey pods contain 3-8 smooth, bright yellow or brown seeds.

The wood is very hard, heavy and yellow in colour. It can be used for axe-handles, wagon spokes and fencing poles. The tree is also grown in gardens due to the attractive flowers.

== Distribution ==
It is native to KwaZulu-Natal and Northern Provinces (of South Africa), Eswatini, Botswana, Malawi, Mozambique, Zambia and Zimbabwe. It is found in low to medium elevations in woodland or wooded grasslands.

== Taxonomy ==
The genus name of Bolusanthus is in honour of Harry Bolus, (1834 – 1911) who was a South African botanist, botanical artist, businessman and philanthropist.

It was first published and described by (Bolus) Hermann Harms (a German botanist) in Repert. Spec. Nov. Regni Veg. 2: 15 in 1906.
