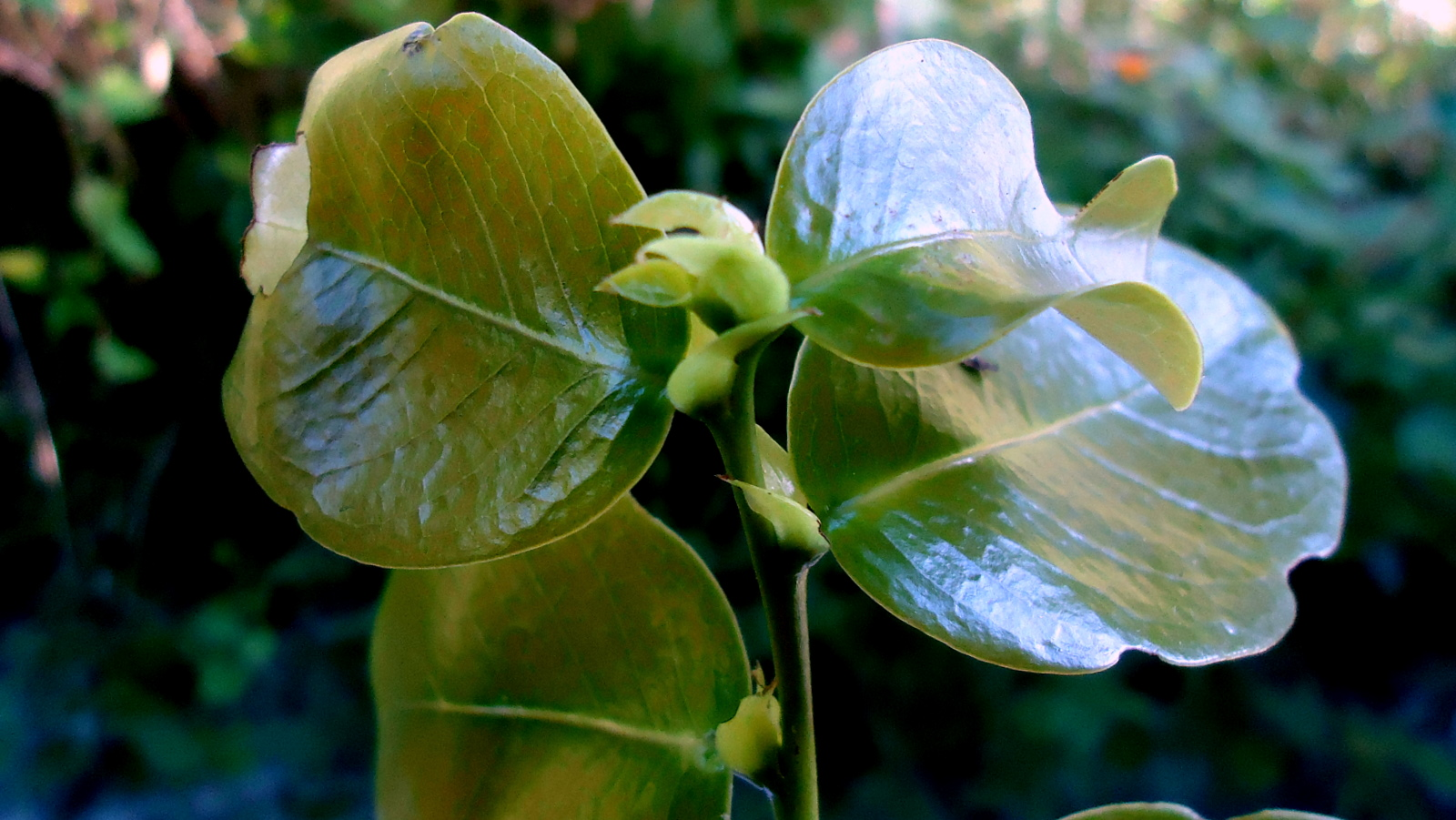
- Zollernia latifolia

Scientific classification
- Kingdom: Plantae
- Clade: Tracheophytes
- Clade: Angiosperms
- Clade: Eudicots
- Clade: Rosids
- Order: Fabales
- Family: Fabaceae
- Subfamily: Faboideae
- Tribe: Exostyleae
- Genus: Zollernia; Wied-Neuw. & Nees (1827)

Species
- Zollernia cowanii Mansano; Zollernia glabra (Spreng.) Yakovlev; Zollernia glaziovii Yakovlev; Zollernia grandifolia Schery; Zollernia ilicifolia (Brongn.) Vogel; Zollernia kanukuensis R.S.Cowan; Zollernia latifolia Benth.; Zollernia paraensis Huber; Zollernia splendens Wied-Neuw. & Nees

Synonyms
- Acidandra Mart. ex Spreng. (1830); Coquebertia Brongn. (1833)

= Zollernia =

Genus of legumes

Zollernia is a genus of flowering plants in the legume family, Fabaceae. It includes 10 species native to South America, ranging from Venezuela and the Guianas to southern Brazil. Zollernia are trees or shrubs that flower annually. Species are most commonly found in dense moist forests, but also grow in seasonally-dry cerrado (savanna and open woodland) and caatinga (deciduous thorn woodland and scrub).

Leaves of Zollernia ilicifolia are used medicinally as an analgesic and antiulcerogenic by the peoples of the Brazilian tropical Atlantic Rainforest.
