= Platycelyphium =

Scientific classification
- Kingdom: Plantae
- Clade: Tracheophytes
- Clade: Angiosperms
- Clade: Eudicots
- Clade: Rosids
- Order: Fabales
- Family: Fabaceae
- Subfamily: Faboideae
- Tribe: Sophoreae
- Genus: Platycelyphium; Harms (1905)
- Species: P. voense

Binomial name
- Platycelyphium voense (Engl.) Wild (1959)

Synonyms
- Commiphora voensis Engl. (1904); Platycelyphium cyananthum Harms (1905)

Genus of legumes

Platycelyphium voense is a species of flowering plant in the family Fabaceae. It is a tree native to Somalia, Ethiopia, Kenya, and Tanzania in eastern Africa. It grows in bushland and thicket in the Somali-Masai region. It is the only member of the genus Platycelyphium. It belongs to subfamily Faboideae.
