= Exostyles venusta =

Scientific classification
- Kingdom: Plantae
- Clade: Tracheophytes
- Clade: Angiosperms
- Clade: Eudicots
- Clade: Rosids
- Order: Fabales
- Family: Fabaceae
- Subfamily: Faboideae
- Genus: Exostyles
- Species: E. venusta

Binomial name
- Exostyles venusta Schott
- Distribution of Exostyles venusta

Species of plant

Exostyles venusta is a species of legume found in Northeast Brazil and Southest Brazil. It is a tree that grows primarily in a wet, tropical, biome. It was first described by Heinrich Wilhelm Schott in 1827. It is a flowering plant and a legume, and grows a large trunk.
