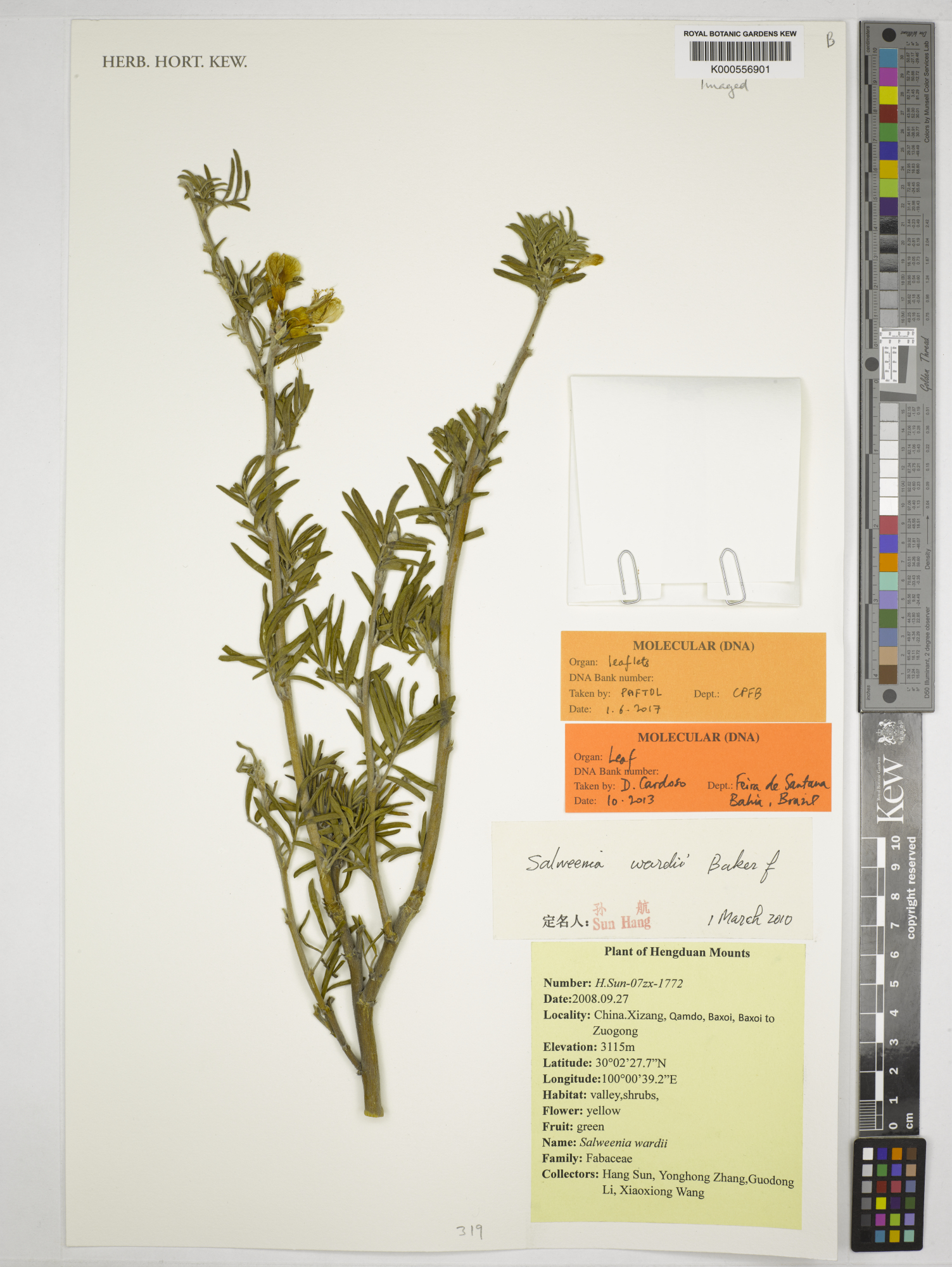

Scientific classification
- Kingdom: Plantae
- Clade: Tracheophytes
- Clade: Angiosperms
- Clade: Eudicots
- Clade: Rosids
- Order: Fabales
- Family: Fabaceae
- Subfamily: Faboideae
- Tribe: Sophoreae
- Genus: Salweenia; Baker f.

Species
- 2; see text
The range of Salweenia:
Salweenia bouffordiana
Salweenia wardii

= Salweenia =

Genus of legumes

Salweenia is a genus of flowering plants in the family Fabaceae. It includes two species of evergreen shrubs native to Tibet and Sichuan. It belongs to the subfamily Faboideae. They grow in dry continental temperate montane habitats, typically thickets on dry stony slopes, on gravel terraces, and in sandy stream beds.

== Species ==
Salweenia comprises the following species:

- Salweenia bouffordiana H.Sun, Zhi M.Li & J.P.Yue
- Salweenia wardii Baker f.
