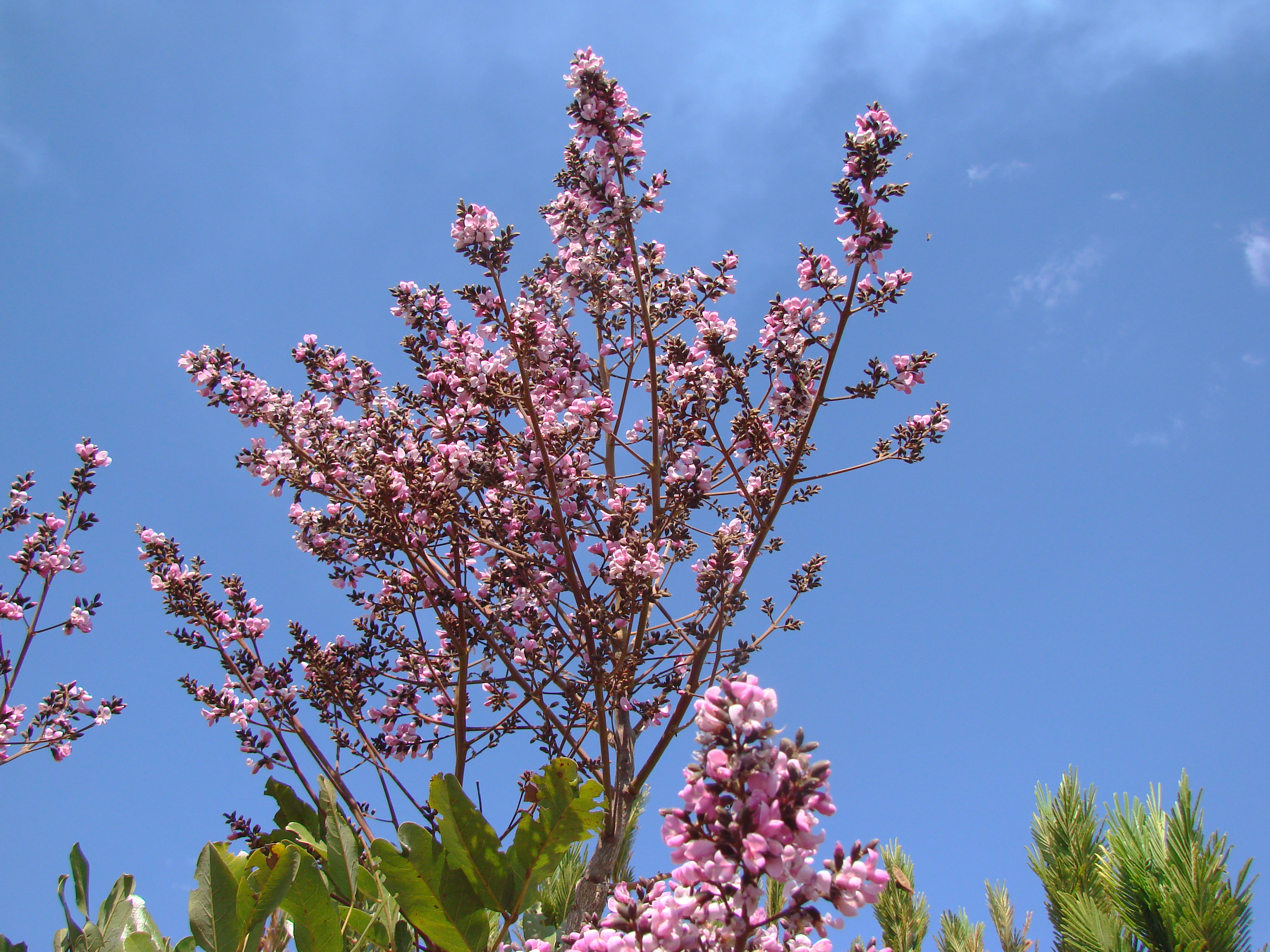
- Vatairea macrocarpa

Scientific classification
- Kingdom: Plantae
- Clade: Tracheophytes
- Clade: Angiosperms
- Clade: Eudicots
- Clade: Rosids
- Order: Fabales
- Family: Fabaceae
- Subfamily: Faboideae
- Clade: Vataireoids
- Genus: Vatairea; Aubl.

Species
- Vatairea erythrocarpa (Ducke) Ducke; Vatairea fusca (Ducke) Ducke; Vatairea guianensis Aubl.; Vatairea heteroptera (Allemão) Ducke; Vatairea lundellii (Standl.) Killip ex Record; Vatairea macrocarpa (Benth.) Ducke; Vatairea paraensis Ducke; Vatairea sericea (Ducke) Ducke

= Vatairea =

Genus of legumes

Vatairea is a genus of flowering plants in the legume family, Fabaceae. It includes eight species of tall trees native to the tropical Americas, ranging from southern Mexico to Bolivia and southern Brazil. Seven species are native to northern South America, with the center of diversity in Amazonia. Vatairea lundellii ranges from southern Mexico to Panama. Most species grow in tropical rain forest, often in the inundated forests known as igapó and varzea, where they are emergent trees, growing above the forest canopy. V. macrocarpa grows in seasonally-dry forest, cerrado (savanna and woodland), and caatinga (scrub forest).

It belongs to the subfamily Faboideae. It was traditionally assigned to the tribe Dalbergieae, mainly on the basis of flower morphology; recent molecular phylogenetic analyses assigned Vatairea into an informal, monophyletic clade called the "vataireoids".
