= Vataireopsis =

Scientific classification
- Kingdom: Plantae
- Clade: Tracheophytes
- Clade: Angiosperms
- Clade: Eudicots
- Clade: Rosids
- Order: Fabales
- Family: Fabaceae
- Subfamily: Faboideae
- Clade: Vataireoids
- Genus: Vataireopsis; Ducke (1932)

Species
- Vataireopsis araroba (Aguiar) Ducke; Vataireopsis iglesiasii Ducke; Vataireopsis speciosa (Aguiar) Ducke; Vataireopsis surinamensis H.C.Lima

Genus of legumes

Vataireopsis is a genus of flowering plants in the legume family, Fabaceae. It includes four species of small to emergent trees, native to northern South America, ranging from Colombia, Venezuela, and the Guianas to Bolivia and southern Brazil. They grow in tropical lowland rain forest, in both the Amazon and Atlantic Forest.

It belongs to the subfamily Faboideae. It was traditionally assigned to the tribe Dalbergieae, mainly on the basis of flower morphology; recent molecular phylogenetic analyses assigned Vataireopsis into an informal, monophyletic clade called the "vataireoids".
