= Exostyles godoyensis =

Scientific classification
- Kingdom: Plantae
- Clade: Tracheophytes
- Clade: Angiosperms
- Clade: Eudicots
- Clade: Rosids
- Order: Fabales
- Family: Fabaceae
- Subfamily: Faboideae
- Genus: Exostyles
- Species: E. godoyensis

Binomial name
- Exostyles godoyensis Soares-Silva & Mansano
- The distribution of Exostyles godoyensis

Species of Exostyle (legume)

Exostyles godoyensis is a plant native to South Brazil and Southeast Brazil. It is a tree that grows in a seasonally dry tropical biome. It was described in 2004 by botonists Lucia Helena Soares-Silva and Vidal de Freitas Mansano.
