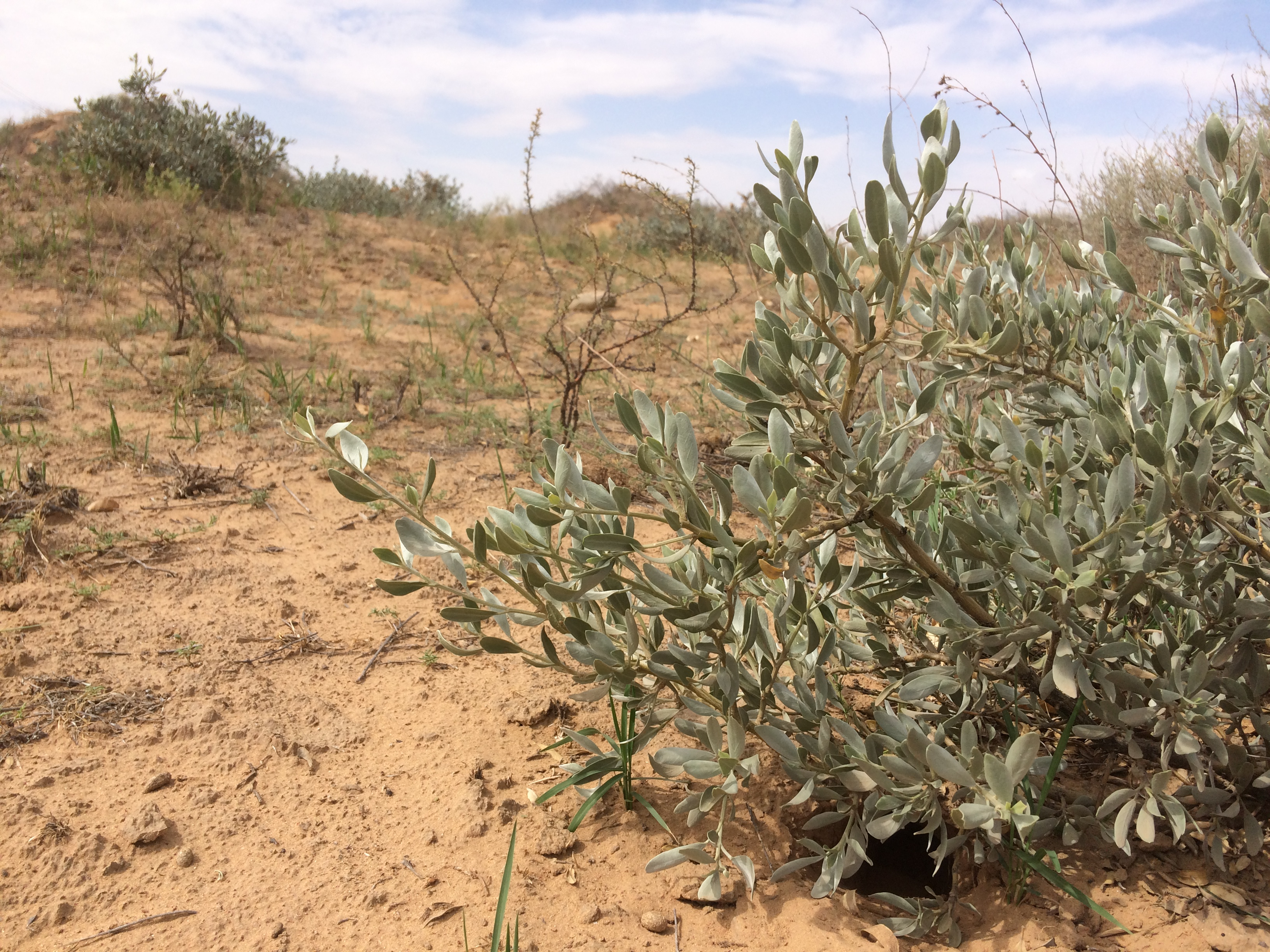
- Ammopiptanthus mongolicus

Scientific classification
- Kingdom: Plantae
- Clade: Tracheophytes
- Clade: Angiosperms
- Clade: Eudicots
- Clade: Rosids
- Order: Fabales
- Family: Fabaceae
- Subfamily: Faboideae
- Tribe: Sophoreae
- Genus: Ammopiptanthus; S.H.Cheng

Species
- 2–3; see text

= Ammopiptanthus =

Genus of legumes

The genus Ammopiptanthus, endemic to the eastern desert of Central Asia, includes two species: A. mongolicus (Maxim.) Cheng f. and A. nanus (M. Pop.) Cheng f.

Ammopiptanthus is the only genus of evergreen broadleaf shrub in the northwest desert of China and both species are dominant in the local vegetation, so this genus plays an important role in fixing moving sands and delaying further desertification. The biological property of Ammopiptanthus evergreen broadleaf has been viewed as an ancestral trait that identifies it as a Tertiary relict taxon. The vegetation in northwest China was dominated by evergreen and/or deciduous broadleaf forests in the early Tertiary period according to the fossil evidence. When subsequent changes made the climate colder and drier from the early Miocene (24–16 Ma) in Central Asia, the forests were gradually replaced by steppe and then by desert. Today, their habitats are stony and/or sandy deserts where the climate is arid (annual precipitation ranges from 100 to 160 mm) and the temperature varies from below −30 °C in the winter to +40 °C in the summer. Because of low seed germination rates in the harsh environments and increasing anthropogenic pressures in their natural range, both A. mongolicus and A. nanus have been categorized as 'endangered' species. As a relict survivor of the evergreen broadleaf forest in this region from the Tertiary period, Ammopiptanthus has acquired the strong ability to adapt to the dry and extremely cold environments. The characteristics described above have recently attracted scientific attention to their anatomy, cold and drought stress resistance, and genetic diversity and geographic differentiation.

== Species ==
Ammopiptanthus comprises the following species:

- Ammopiptanthus mongolicus (Kom.) S.H. Cheng
- Ammopiptanthus nanus (Popov) S.H. Cheng

== Species names with uncertain taxonomic status ==
The status of the following species is unresolved:

- Ammopiptanthus kamelinii Lazkov
