= Uribea =

Scientific classification
- Kingdom: Plantae
- Clade: Tracheophytes
- Clade: Angiosperms
- Clade: Eudicots
- Clade: Rosids
- Order: Fabales
- Family: Fabaceae
- Subfamily: Faboideae
- Tribe: Exostyleae
- Genus: Uribea; Dugand & Romero (1962)
- Species: U. tamarindoides

Binomial name
- Uribea tamarindoides Dugand & Romero (1962)

Genus of legumes

Uribea tamarindoides is a species of flowering plant in the legume family, Fabaceae. It is a tree native to Costa Rica, Panama, and Colombia, where it grows in tropical lowland rain forest. It is the only member of genus Uribea. The genus belongs to subfamily Faboideae.
