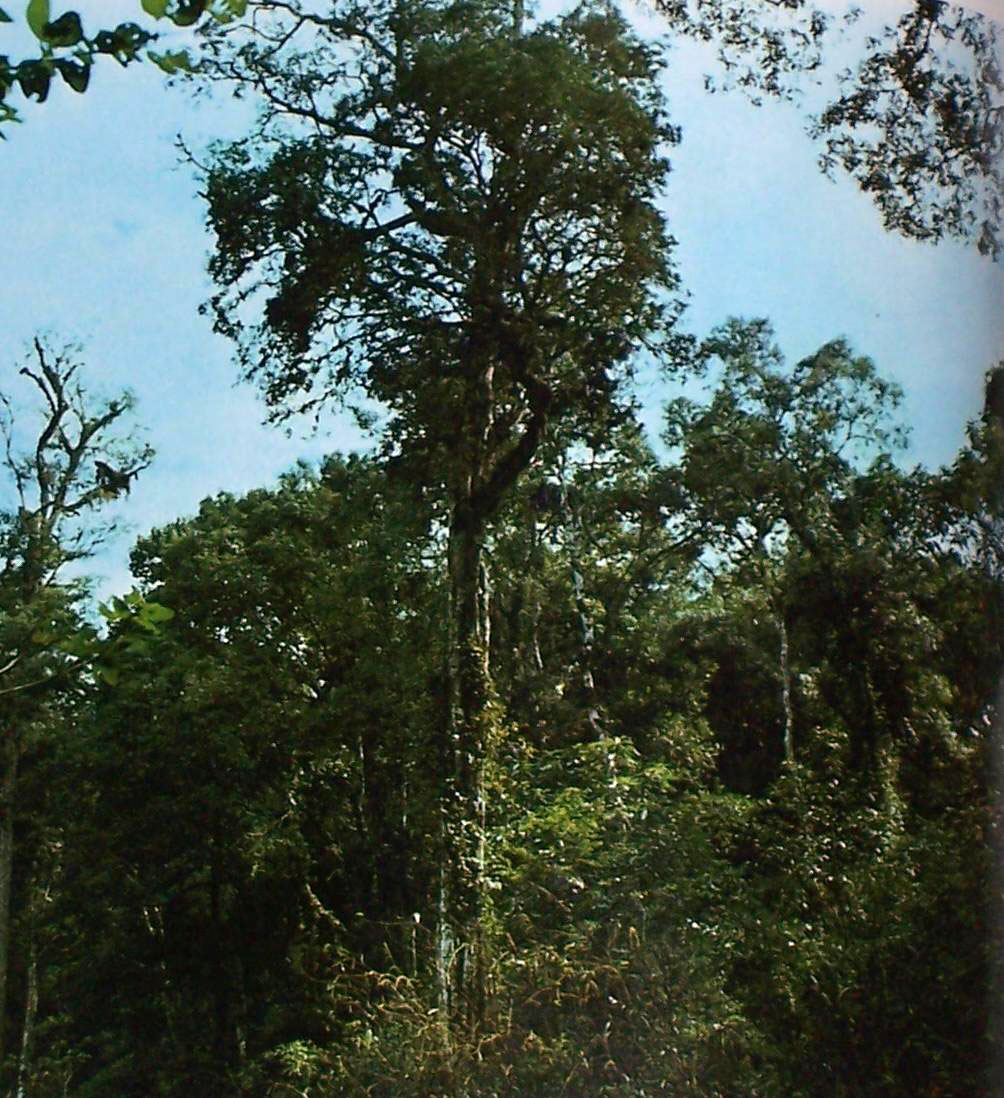
- Holocalyx balansae

Scientific classification
- Kingdom: Plantae
- Clade: Tracheophytes
- Clade: Angiosperms
- Clade: Eudicots
- Clade: Rosids
- Order: Fabales
- Family: Fabaceae
- Subfamily: Faboideae
- Tribe: Exostyleae
- Genus: Holocalyx; Micheli (1883)
- Species: H. balansae

Binomial name
- Holocalyx balansae Micheli (1883)

= Holocalyx =

Genus of legumes

Holocalyx balansae is a species of flowering plant in the legume family, Fabaceae. It belongs to the subfamily Faboideae. It is the only member of the genus Holocalyx. It is a tree native to South America, where it ranges from eastern, southern, and west-central Brazil to Bolivia, Paraguay, and northeastern Argentina.
