= Exostyles =

Scientific classification
- Kingdom: Plantae
- Clade: Tracheophytes
- Clade: Angiosperms
- Clade: Eudicots
- Clade: Rosids
- Order: Fabales
- Family: Fabaceae
- Subfamily: Faboideae
- Tribe: Exostyleae
- Genus: Exostyles; Schott

Species
- Exostyles amazonica Yakovlev; Exostyles glabra Vogel; Exostyles godoyensis Soares-Silva & Mansano; Exostyles venusta Schott
- A map showing the distribution of the species in the Exostyles genus.

Genus of legumes

Exostyles is a genus of flowering plants in the legume family, Fabaceae. It belongs to subfamily Faboideae. It includes four species native to Brazil and Suriname. The species primarily inhabit around bodies of water, especially the Amazon River and the east coast of South America. The Genus is characterized by alternate leaflets, imparipinnate leaves, persistent stipules and stipels, 10 free stamens, zygomorphic flowers, basifixed anthers, and a berry-like legume fruit.
