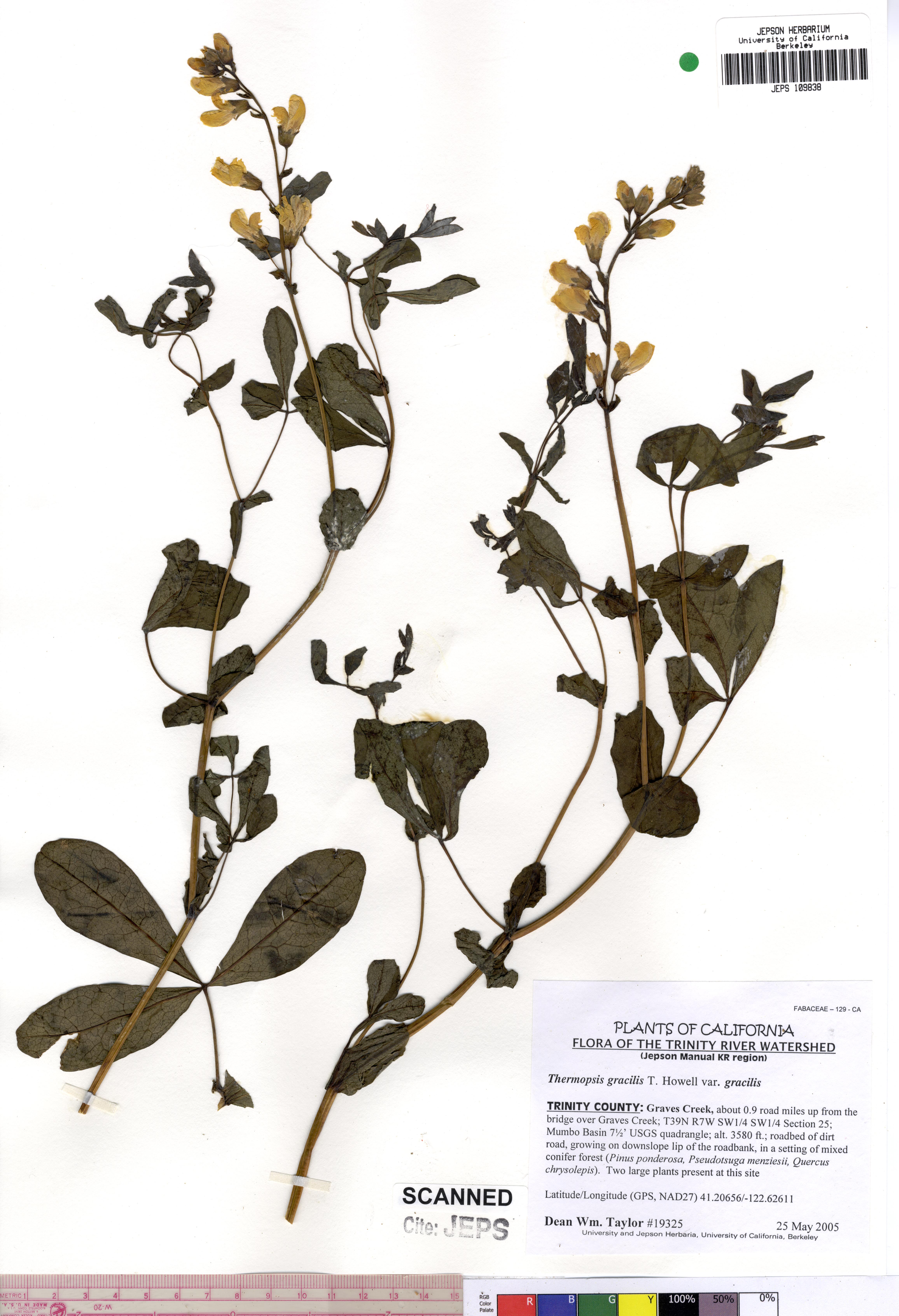
- Herbarium specimen

Conservation status
- Apparently Secure (NatureServe)

Scientific classification
- Kingdom: Plantae
- Clade: Embryophytes
- Clade: Tracheophytes
- Clade: Spermatophytes
- Clade: Angiosperms
- Clade: Eudicots
- Clade: Rosids
- Order: Fabales
- Family: Fabaceae
- Subfamily: Faboideae
- Genus: Thermopsis
- Species: T. gracilis

Binomial name
- Thermopsis gracilis Howell

= Thermopsis gracilis =

Species of legume

Thermopsis gracilis is a species of flowering plant in the legume family known by the common name slender goldenbanner.

It is native to the western United States from Washington state to northern California.

It grows in open mountain forests and other habitats.

== Description ==
Thermopsis gracilis is a rhizomatous perennial herb producing a fuzzy-haired, hollow stem up to a meter (3 ft.) tall. Each leaf has three leaflets as well as stipules that look like leaflets.

The inflorescence is a raceme of many bright yellow pealike flowers each measuring 2 centimeters long or more. The fruit is a leathery legume pod containing the seeds.
