= Neoharmsia =

Scientific classification
- Kingdom: Plantae
- Clade: Tracheophytes
- Clade: Angiosperms
- Clade: Eudicots
- Clade: Rosids
- Order: Fabales
- Family: Fabaceae
- Subfamily: Faboideae
- Tribe: Sophoreae
- Genus: Neoharmsia; R.Vig. (1952)

Species
- Neoharmsia baronii (Drake) R.Vig.; Neoharmsia madagascariensis R.Vig.

Genus of legumes

Neoharmsia is a genus of legume in the family Fabaceae. It includes two species of trees or shrubs endemic to Madagascar. Typical habitats are seasonally-dry tropical woodland and succulent thicket or woodland, on limestone or coastal sand, in the northern and western parts of the island.
