= Lecointea =

Scientific classification
- Kingdom: Plantae
- Clade: Tracheophytes
- Clade: Angiosperms
- Clade: Eudicots
- Clade: Rosids
- Order: Fabales
- Family: Fabaceae
- Subfamily: Faboideae
- Tribe: Exostyleae
- Genus: Lecointea; Ducke (1922)

Species
- 7; see text

Synonyms
- Beliceodendron Lundell (1975)

Genus of legumes

Lecointea is a genus of flowering plants in the family Fabaceae. It contains seven species native to the tropical Americas.

- Lecointea amazonica Ducke
- Lecointea guianensis M.Yu.Gontsch. & Yakovlev
- Lecointea hatschbachii Barneby
- Lecointea lasiogyne (Barneby) M.Yu.Gontsch. & Yakovlev
- Lecointea marcano-bertii Barneby
- Lecointea ovalifolia J.F.Macbr.
- Lecointea peruviana Standl. ex J.F.Macbr.

Its native range stretches from south-eastern Mexico to southern Tropical America. It is found in Belize, Bolivia, Brazil, Colombia, Costa Rica, Ecuador, French Guiana, Guyana, Honduras, Mexico, Nicaragua, Panamá, Peru, Suriname and Venezuela.

The genus name of Lecointea is in honour of Paul Georges Aimé Le Cointe (1870–1956), a French botanist who worked in Brazil. He was also the director of a museum in Belém. It was first described and published in Arch. Jard. Bot. Rio de Janeiro Vol.3 on page 128 in 1922.
