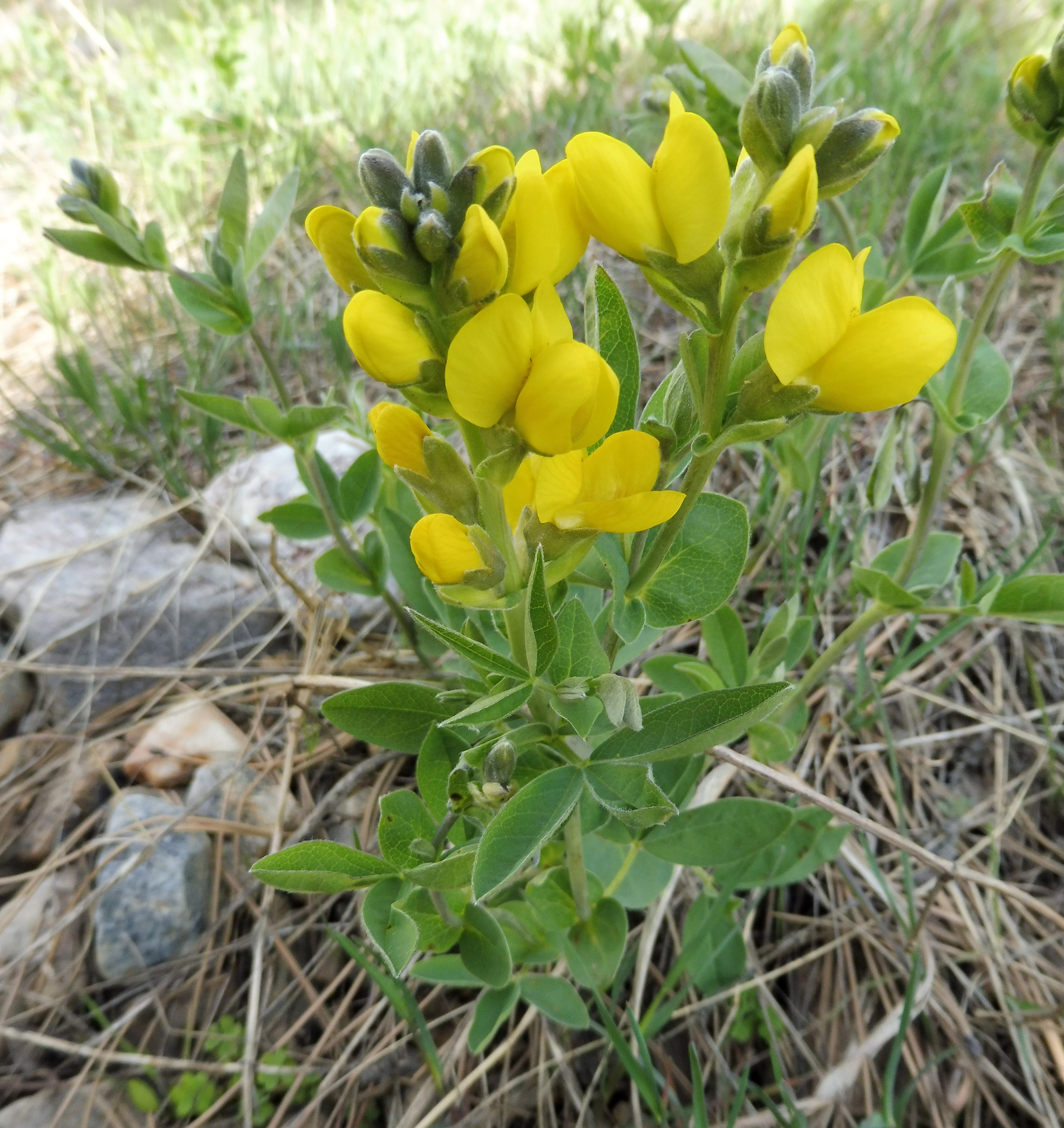

Conservation status
- Secure (NatureServe)

Scientific classification
- Kingdom: Plantae
- Clade: Tracheophytes
- Clade: Angiosperms
- Clade: Eudicots
- Clade: Rosids
- Order: Fabales
- Family: Fabaceae
- Subfamily: Faboideae
- Genus: Thermopsis
- Species: T. rhombifolia

Binomial name
- Thermopsis rhombifolia (Nutt. ex Pursh) Nutt. ex Richardson

= Thermopsis rhombifolia =

Species of legume

Thermopsis rhombifolia, also known as prairie thermopsis, is a species of flowering plant in the legume family. It is native to North America, where it is found in the Great Plains, with extensions into the lower canyons of the Rocky Mountains. Its natural habitat is dry grasslands and woodlands.

It is a perennial herb that produces yellow flowers in the spring.

== Usage ==
The flowers were commonly used by the natives as a source of yellow dye and were boiled in tea as a cure for stomach ailments for people and horses. The plant has toxic properties if ingested; symptoms of poisoning include vomiting, dizziness, and abdominal pain.

=== Toxicity ===
T. rhombifolia contains a number of quinolizidine alkaloids, including anagyrine, thermopsine, rhombifoline, cytisine, N-methylcytisine, 5,6-dehydrolupanine, and lupanine. The alkaloid content is highest in the seeds.

After ingesting a handful of "peas" (immature seed), a 6 year old girl developed a headache about 6–7 hours postingestion, which persisted for 12 hours, together with mild vomiting. A boy of the same age had eaten an unknown number of peas and started vomiting in about 4 hours, mild vomiting persisting for 2 hours, accompanied by nausea but no headache. In a separate case, an 8 year old boy ingested about 6 peas and started vomiting about 3–4 hours postingestion, complaining of abdominal cramping and headache. Most of the vomiting occurred in the first few hours, but the symptoms gradually abated over the next 24 hours.

A 6 year old boy ingested 20 or more flowers, developing abdominal pain and cramps after about 45 minutes. He vomited about 6–7 times over the next 8 hours. Within an hour postingestion, he became drowsy, weak, and had several episodes of dizziness and stumbling which persisted over the first few hours. After 4 hours, he developed a headache, which lasted about 10–12 hours. His blood pressure and heart rate were not significantly affected. He was treated with activated charcoal. In a separate case, a 6 year old girl ingested 2–3 flowers, developing nausea and lethargy within an hour. Symptoms subsided over the next 3–4 hours.
