= Phyllonorycter nepalensis =

Scientific classification
- Kingdom: Animalia
- Phylum: Arthropoda
- Class: Insecta
- Order: Lepidoptera
- Family: Gracillariidae
- Genus: Phyllonorycter
- Species: P. nepalensis

Binomial name
- Phyllonorycter nepalensis Kumata, 1973

Species of moth

Phyllonorycter nepalensis is a moth of the family Gracillariidae. It is known from the Nepal.

The wingspan is 7.2 mm for males and 6 mm for female.

The larvae feed on Alnus nepalensis. They mine the leaves of their host plant.
