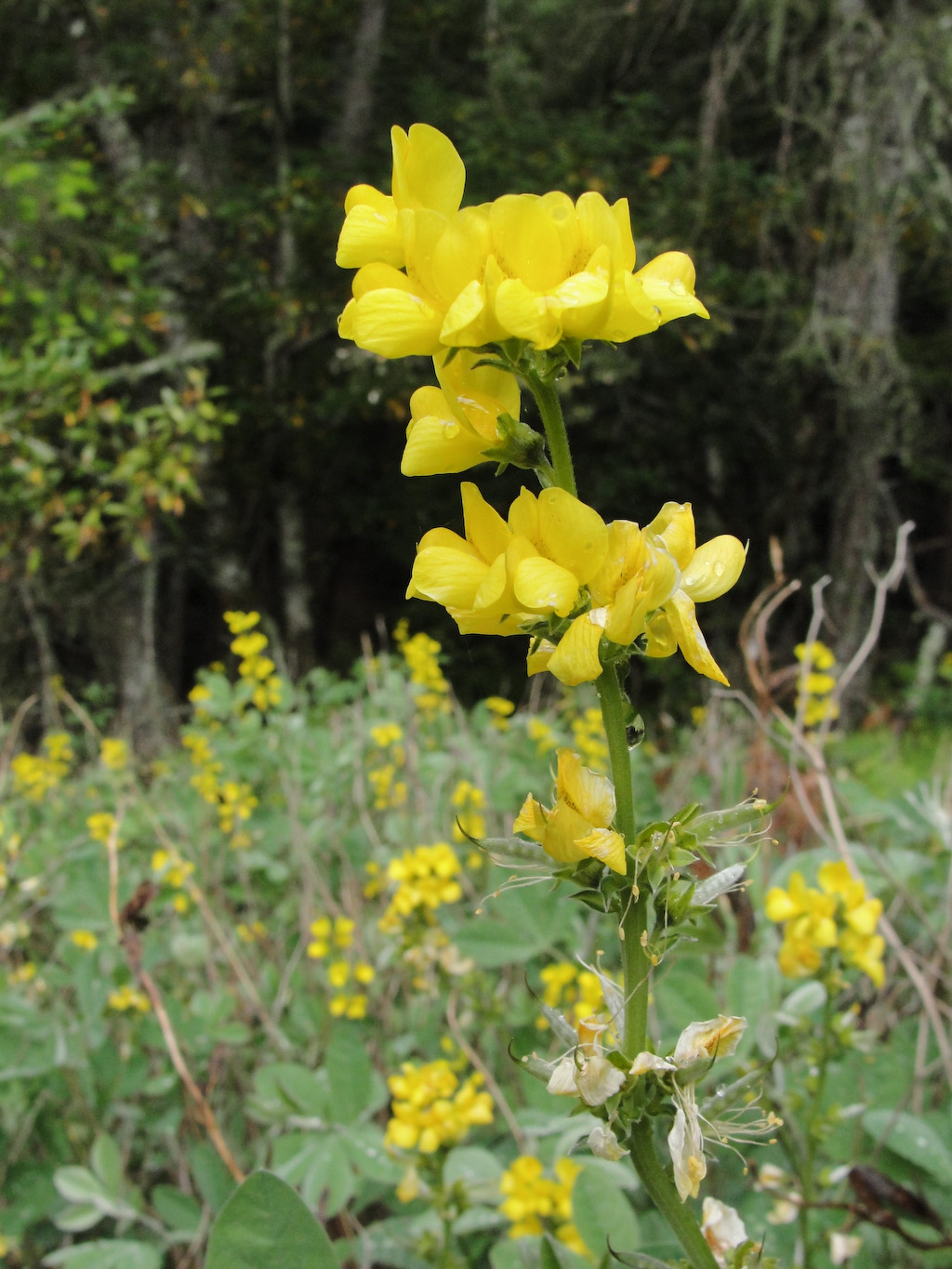

Conservation status
- Critically Imperiled (NatureServe)

Scientific classification
- Kingdom: Plantae
- Clade: Embryophytes
- Clade: Tracheophytes
- Clade: Spermatophytes
- Clade: Angiosperms
- Clade: Eudicots
- Clade: Rosids
- Order: Fabales
- Family: Fabaceae
- Subfamily: Faboideae
- Genus: Thermopsis
- Species: T. macrophylla

Binomial name
- Thermopsis macrophylla Hook. & Arn.

= Thermopsis macrophylla =

Species of legume

Thermopsis macrophylla is a species of flowering plant in the legume family known by the common names Santa Inez goldenbanner and Santa Ynez false-lupine.

== Distribution ==
It is endemic to Santa Barbara County, California, where there are 500 to 2500 individuals remaining in the Santa Ynez Mountains. Only two occurrences have been confirmed recently, but the appearance of plants in coming seasons will depend on wildfire activity in the region, because plants spring up from the dormant seed bank after fire. All the known populations occur on wildlands within the Los Padres National Forest.

The plant grows in chaparral on sandstone soils among chamise (Adenostoma fasciculatum), Eastwood's manzanita (Arctostaphylos glandulosa), and chaparral whitethorn (Ceanothus leucodermis).

This species once included several other species of Thermopsis, but in 1994, the others were separated out and elevated to species status, and the name T. macrophylla was applied to this rare variety limited to the Santa Ynez Mountains.

== Description ==
This is a rhizomatous perennial herb growing up to 2 m (6 ft 7 in) tall and 1 m (3 ft 3 in) wide. It produces up to ten inflorescences each bearing up to 100 bright yellow flowers up to 2 cm (0.79 in) long each. The fruit is a legume pod containing six to eight seeds. The seeds have very hard coats and must be scarified by fire until they reach 80 °C (176 °F) if they are to germinate.
