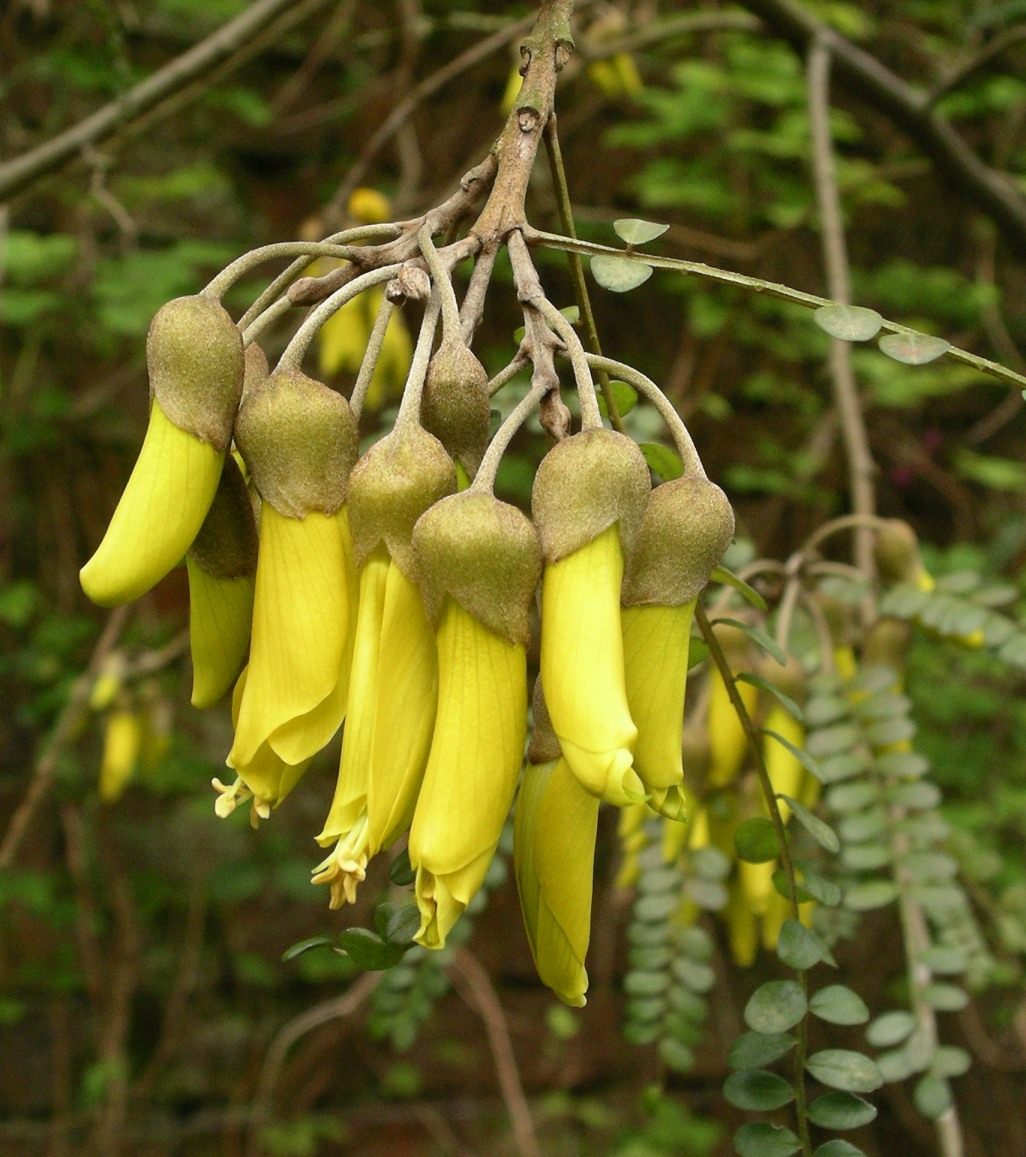
- Sophora tetraptera

Scientific classification
- Kingdom: Plantae
- Clade: Tracheophytes
- Clade: Angiosperms
- Clade: Eudicots
- Clade: Rosids
- Order: Fabales
- Family: Fabaceae
- Subfamily: Faboideae
- Clade: Meso-Papilionoideae
- Clade: Genistoids
- Clade: Core Genistoids
- Tribe: Sophoreae (Spreng. ex DC. 1825) Cardoso et al. 2013

Genera
- See text

Synonyms
- Euchresteae (Nakai) H.Ohashi 1973; Sophora group sensu Polhill 1994; Sophoreae sensu stricto; Sophoreae sensu Polhill 1981 pro parte 7; Thermopsideae Yakovlev 1972

= Sophoreae =

Tribe of legumes

The tribe Sophoreae is one of the subdivisions of the plant family Fabaceae. Traditionally this tribe has been used as a wastebasket taxon to accommodate genera of Faboideae which exhibit actinomorphic, rather than zygomorphic floral symmetry and/or incompletely differentiated petals and free stamens. Various morphological and molecular analyses indicated that Sophoreae as traditionally circumscribed was polyphyletic. This led to a re-circumscription of Sophoreae, which resulted in the transfer of many genera to other tribes (Amburaneae, Angylocalyceae, Baphieae, Camoensieae, the Cladrastis clade, Exostyleae, Leptolobieae, Ormosieae, Podalyrieae, and the Vataireoids). This also necessitated the inclusion of two former tribes, Euchresteae and Thermopsideae, in the new definition of Sophoreae. Tribe Sophoreae, as currently circumscribed, consistently forms a monophyletic clade in molecular phylogenetic analyses. The Sophoreae arose 40.8 ± 2.4 million years ago (in the Eocene).

Description of morphological synapomorphies has yet to be undertaken, but members of this tribe can be distinguished by the relatively simple flowers, unspecialized pinnate leaves, accumulation of quinolizidine alkaloids, and the presence of free stamens. The tribe does have a node-based definition: the crown clade originating from the most recent common ancestor of Bolusanthus speciosus (Bolus) Harms and Sophora davidii (Franch.) Pavol..

== Genera ==
Sophoreae comprises the following genera:

- Ammodendron Fisch. ex DC.
- Ammopiptanthus S. H. Cheng
- Ammothamnus Bunge (Note: Often included in Sophora, rather than treated as a segregate genus.)
- Anagyris L.
- Baptisia Vent.
- Bolusanthus Harms
- Dicraeopetalum Harms
- Euchresta (Lesch.) Benn.
- Maackia Rupr.
- Neoharmsia R.Vig.
- Piptanthus Sweet
- Platycelyphium Harms
- Salweenia Baker f.
- Sophora L.
- Thermopsis R.Br.
- Vuralia Uysal & Ertugrul
