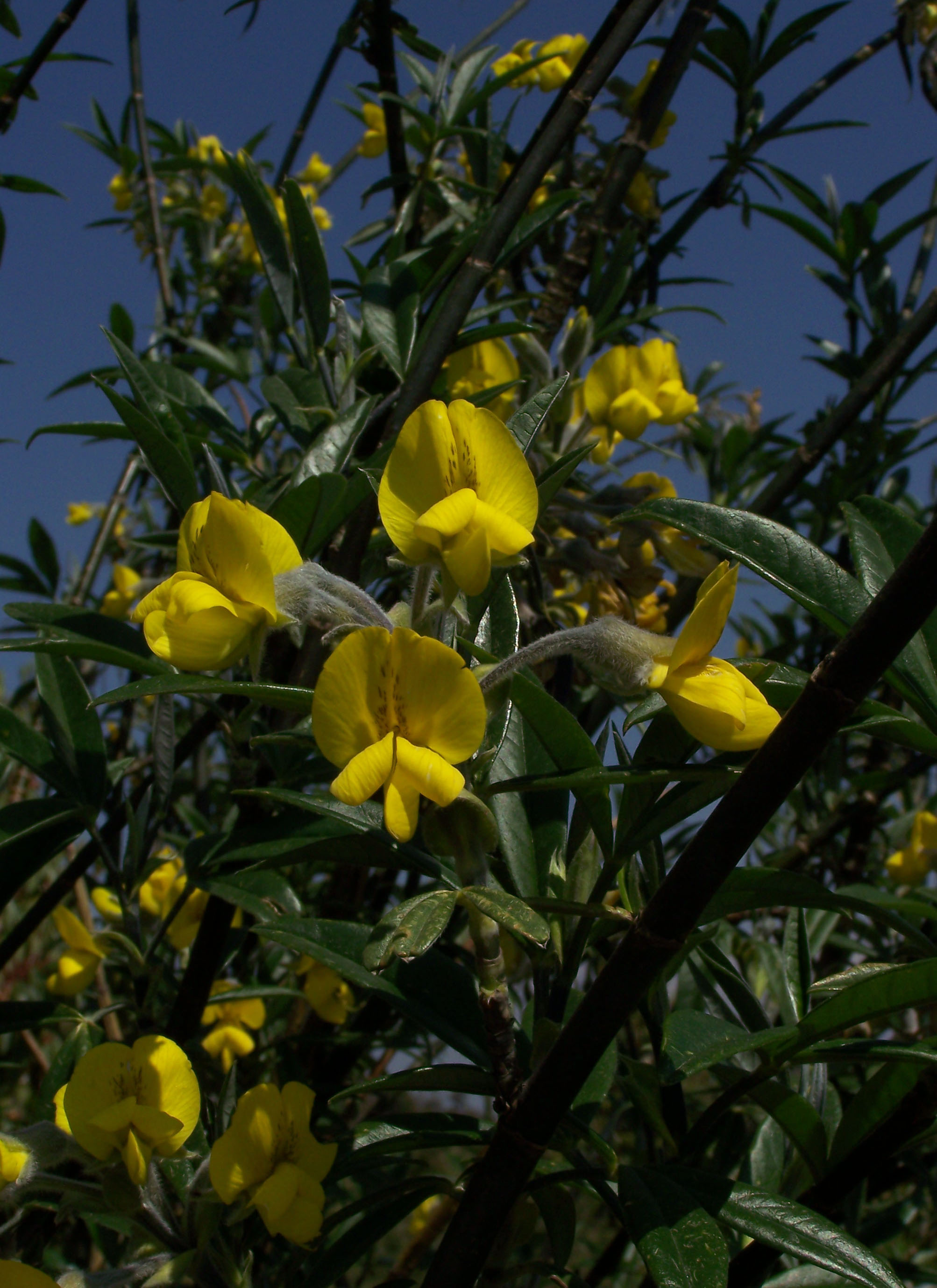
- Piptanthus nepalensis, Nepal

Scientific classification
- Kingdom: Plantae
- Clade: Embryophytes
- Clade: Tracheophytes
- Clade: Spermatophytes
- Clade: Angiosperms
- Clade: Eudicots
- Clade: Rosids
- Order: Fabales
- Family: Fabaceae
- Subfamily: Faboideae
- Genus: Piptanthus
- Species: P. nepalensis

Binomial name
- Piptanthus nepalensis (Hook.) Sweet

= Piptanthus nepalensis =

Species of flowering plant

Piptanthus nepalensis is a species of flowering plant in the legume family Fabaceae. It is native to the Himalayas and adjacent regions, including Bhutan, China, India, Myanmar, and Nepal.

== Description ==
Piptanthus nepalensis is a shrub that is variable in morphology, particularly in the arrangement of hairs on its leaves and other parts. It is evergreen in mild sheltered sites and semi-evergreen elsewhere, losing its leaves in severe frost but recovering in spring. The growth is upright and flexible, and plants can be trained against walls where they flower more profusely. The flowers are large and bright yellow, resembling those of Laburnum, and are borne in short upright clusters.

Piptanthus nepalensis is morphologically variable and has historically been divided into multiple species, many of which are now treated as synonyms.

== Distribution and habitat ==
Piptanthus nepalensis grows in montane grassland, thicket, and forest margins across its native range in the Himalayas and surrounding regions.

== Genomics ==
A chromosome-level genome assembly of Piptanthus nepalensis was published in 2026. The genome size is approximately 1.04 Gb, with about 99.0% of the sequence anchored to nine pseudo-chromosomes. The assembly has a BUSCO completeness of 99.3%, and 26,035 protein-coding genes were predicted.
