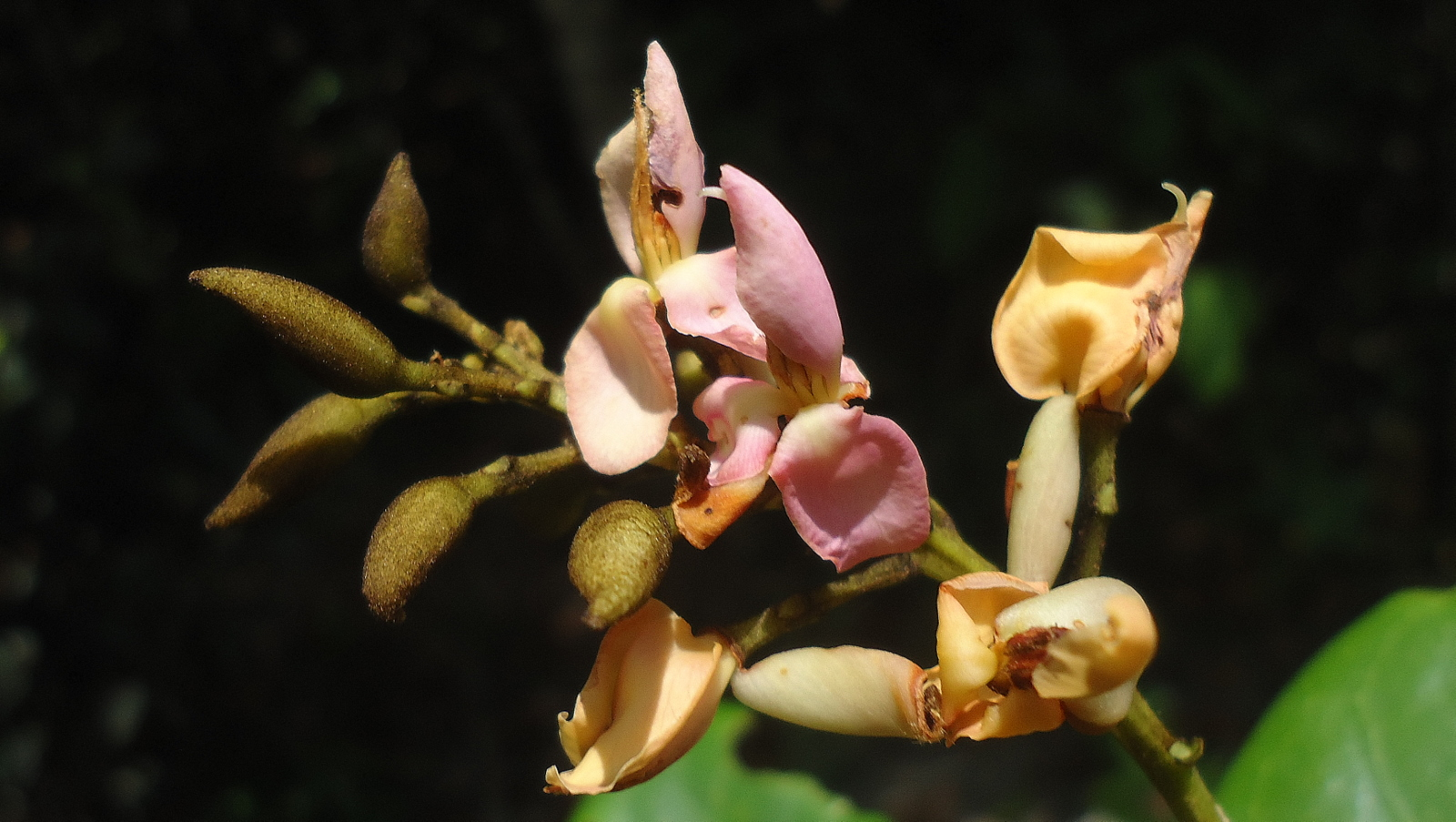
- Zollernia latifolia

Scientific classification
- Kingdom: Plantae
- Clade: Tracheophytes
- Clade: Angiosperms
- Clade: Eudicots
- Clade: Rosids
- Order: Fabales
- Family: Fabaceae
- Subfamily: Faboideae
- Clade: Meso-Papilionoideae
- Tribe: Exostyleae (Cardoso et al. 2012) Cardoso et al. 2013

Synonyms
- Lecointea clade; Lecointioid clade Cardoso et al. 2012; Lecointioids; Sophoreae sensu Polhill, 1981 pro parte 4; Swartzieae sensu Cowan, 1981 pro parte B; Swartzieae sensu Cowan, 1981 pro parte C

= Exostyleae =

Clade of legumes

The tribe Exostyleae is an early-branching monophyletic clade of the flowering plant subfamily Faboideae (or Papilionaceae) that are mostly found in Neotropical rainforests.

== Description ==
This clade is composed of 6 genera, most of which were traditionally assigned to the tribe Swartzieae. However, recent molecular phylogenetic analyses circumscribed these six genera into a strongly supported monophyletic clade. Synapomorphic traits that unite the members of this clade include non-papilionate flowers, "serrate and sometimes spinescent leaflet or leaf margins, standard position variable in the floral bud, basifixed anthers, and drupaceous fruits". They are also united by wood anatomy, sharing an "uncommon presence of crystals in ray cells", and floral ontogeny, sharing "unidirectional initiation of five sepals, simultaneous initiation of petals, and[…]unusual antepetalous stamens initiating before the antesepalous ones."

== Genera ==
- Exostyles Schott
- Harleyodendron R. S. Cowan
- Holocalyx Micheli
- Lecointea Ducke.
- Uribea Dugand & Romero
- Zollernia Wied-Neuw. & Nees
