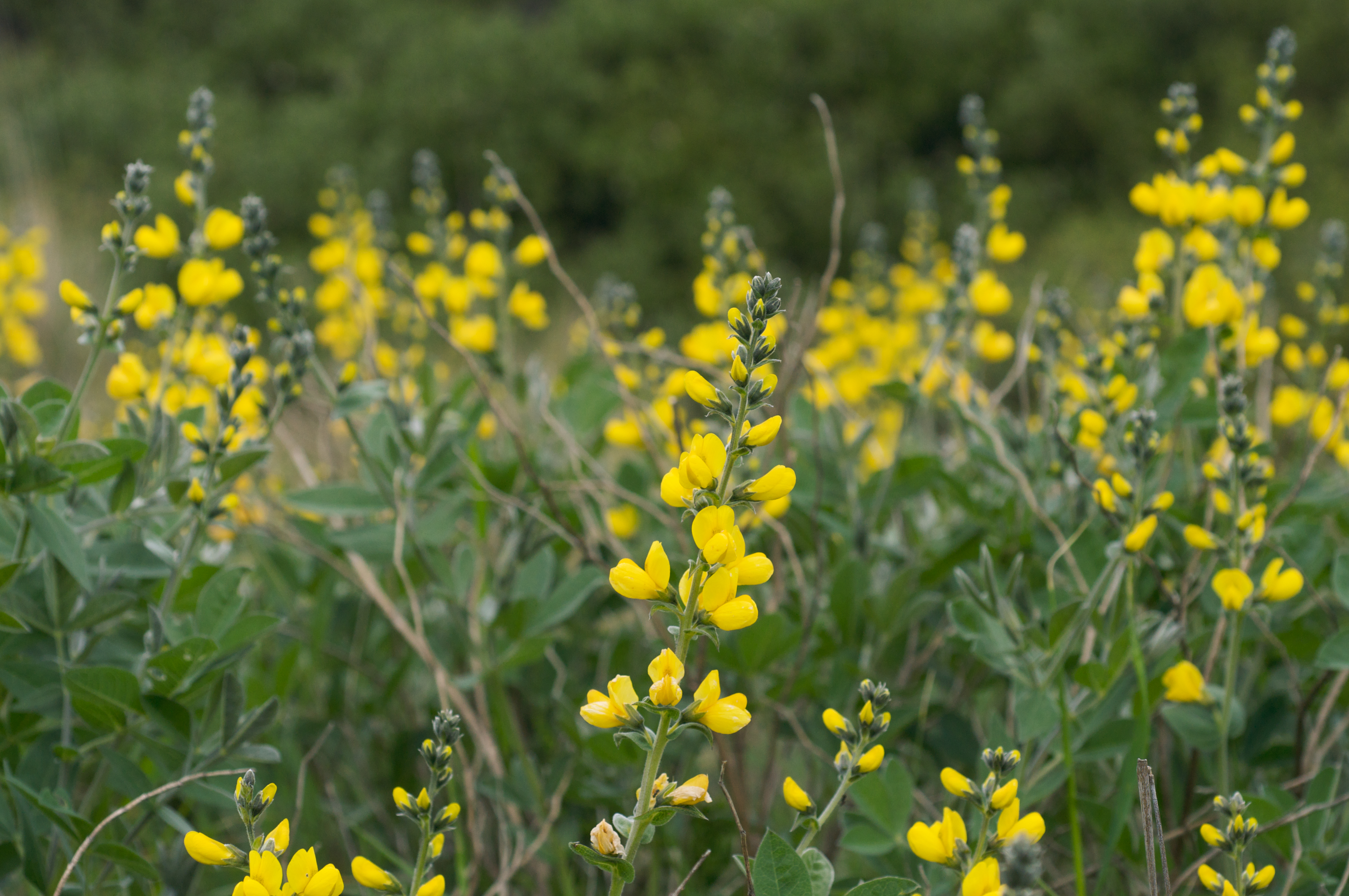
- Thermopsis californica

Scientific classification
- Kingdom: Plantae
- Clade: Tracheophytes
- Clade: Angiosperms
- Clade: Eudicots
- Clade: Rosids
- Order: Fabales
- Family: Fabaceae
- Subfamily: Faboideae
- Tribe: Sophoreae
- Genus: Thermopsis; R.Br.

Species
- 27; see text

Synonyms
- Drepilia Raf. (1837); Scolobus Raf. (1819); Thermia Nutt. (1818)

= Thermopsis =

Genus of legumes

Thermopsis is a genus of legumes, native to temperate North America and east Asia. They are herbaceous perennials and are known as goldenbanners or false-lupines.

== Species ==
Thermopsis comprises the following species:

- Thermopsis alpina (Pall.) Ledeb.
- Thermopsis alterniflora Regel & Schmalh.
- Thermopsis barbata Benth.
- Thermopsis bargusinensis Czefr.
- Thermopsis californica S. Watson — western North America
  - var. argentata (Greene) C.J.Chen & B.L.Turner
  - var. californica S. Watson
  - var. semota (Jeps.) C.J.Chen & B.L.Turner
- Thermopsis chinensis S. Moore
- Thermopsis dahurica Czefr.
- Thermopsis dolichocarpa V.A. Nikitin
- Thermopsis gracilis Howell — western North America
- Thermopsis gyirongensis S.Q. Wei
- Thermopsis hirsutissima Czefr.
- Thermopsis inflata Cambess.
- Thermopsis jacutica Czefr.
- Thermopsis lanceolata R.Br.
- Thermopsis longicarpa N.Ulziykh.
- Thermopsis macrophylla Hook. & Arn. — western North America
- Thermopsis mollis (Michx.) M.A.Curtis ex A.Gray — eastern North America
- Thermopsis mongolica Czefr.
- Thermopsis montana Nutt. — Rocky Mountains of North America
  - var. hitchcockii (Isely) M.G.Mendenh.
  - var. montana
- Thermopsis przewalskii Czefr.
- Thermopsis rhombifolia (Pursh) Richardson — Rocky Mountains of North America
- Thermopsis robusta Howell—western North America
- Thermopsis schischkinii Czefr.
- Thermopsis smithiana E.Peter
- Thermopsis turkestanica Gand.
- Thermopsis villosa (Walter) Fernald & B.G.Schub.—eastern North America
- Thermopsis yushuensis S.Q.Wei

== Toxicity ==
The toxicity of T. rhombifolia and T. montana has been the subject of research. The toxicity is known to come from a series of alpha-pyridone quinolizidine alkaloids, including (in decreasing order of relative abundance in plant tissues) anagyrine, thermposine, 5,6-dehydrolupanine, cytisine, N-methylcystisine, lupanine, and 17-oxysparteine. Their concentration is highest in young plants, flowers, and legumes, though otherwise generally alkaloid concentrations are equal throughout the plant. Alkaloid dosage from plant ingestion is in the range of 1.1–11.3 mg/kg.

A 1997 review found 23 cases. 18 patients developed symptoms within a few hours and symptoms lasted up to 12 hours, including vomiting, dizziness, abdominal pain, drowsiness, nausea, headache, oral irritation, tachycardia, tremors, and other general signs. Only 2 required admission to a health care facility, one of which involved elevated CK levels. Purified alkaloids cause the same signs of intoxication as the whole plant.
