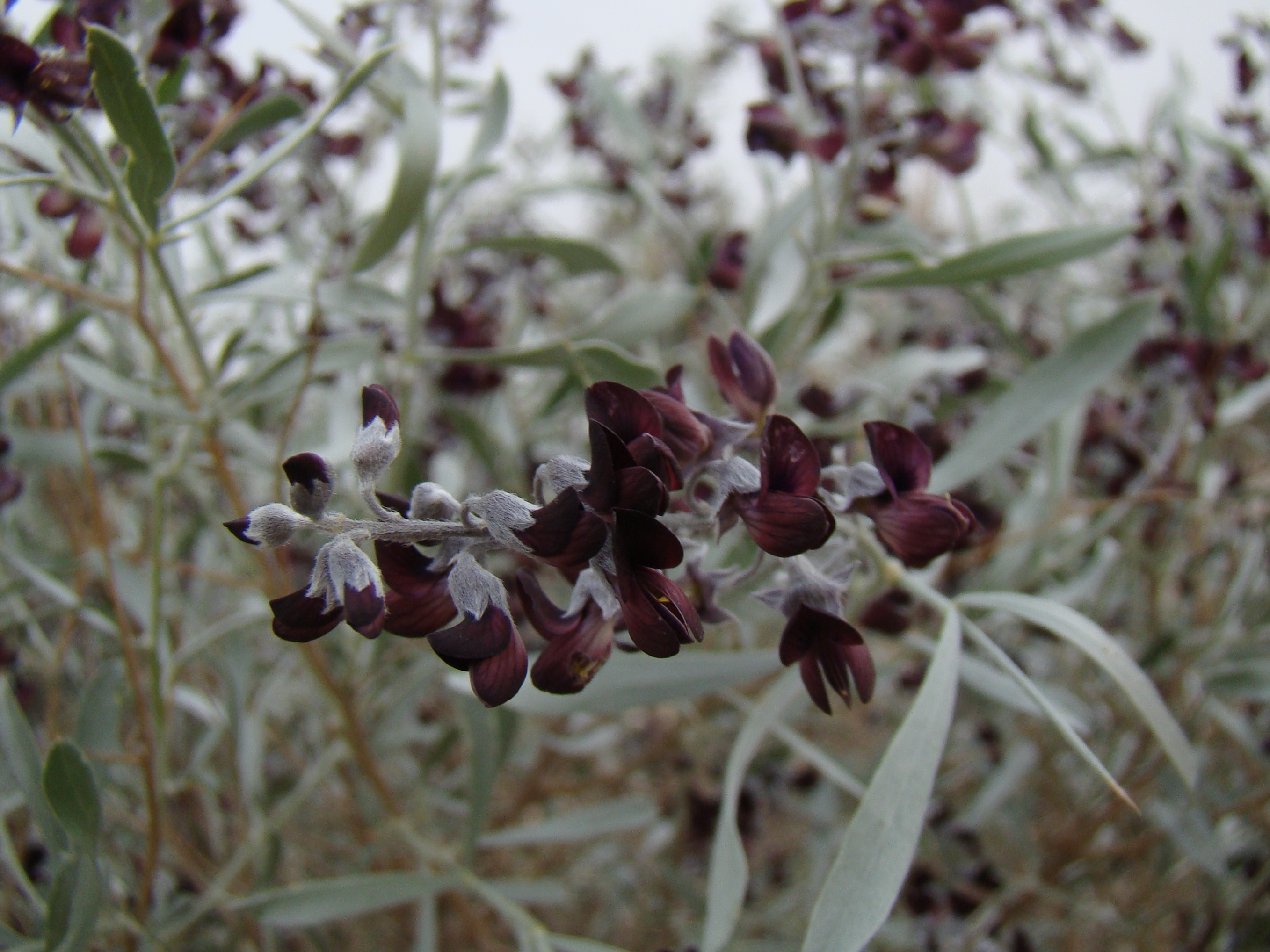

Scientific classification
- Kingdom: Plantae
- Clade: Embryophytes
- Clade: Tracheophytes
- Clade: Spermatophytes
- Clade: Angiosperms
- Clade: Eudicots
- Clade: Rosids
- Order: Fabales
- Family: Fabaceae
- Subfamily: Faboideae
- Tribe: Sophoreae
- Genus: Ammodendron; Fisch. ex DC. (1825)

Species
- Ammodendron bifolium (Pall.) Yakovlev; Ammodendron conollyi Bunge ex Boiss.; Ammodendron eichwaldii Ledeb. & C.A.Mey.; Ammodendron karelinii Fisch. & C.A.Mey. ex Ledeb.; Ammodendron persicum Bunge ex Boiss.

= Ammodendron =

Genus of legumes

Ammodendron is a genus of flowering plants, called the sand acacias, in the family Fabaceae. It contains five species, which range from Iran through Central Asia to Xinjiang. It belongs to the subfamily Faboideae. Its name is derived from the Greek άμμος ammos ("sand") and δένδρον dendron ("tree").

== Species ==
Ammodendron includes five accepted species:

- Ammodendron bifolium (Pall.) Yakovlev – Central Asia and Xinjiang
- Ammodendron conollyi Bunge ex Boiss. – Iran and Central Asia
- Ammodendron eichwaldii Ledeb. & C.A.Mey. – Central Asia
- Ammodendron karelinii Fisch. & C.A.Mey. ex Ledeb. – Central Asia
- Ammodendron persicum Bunge ex Boiss. – Iran
