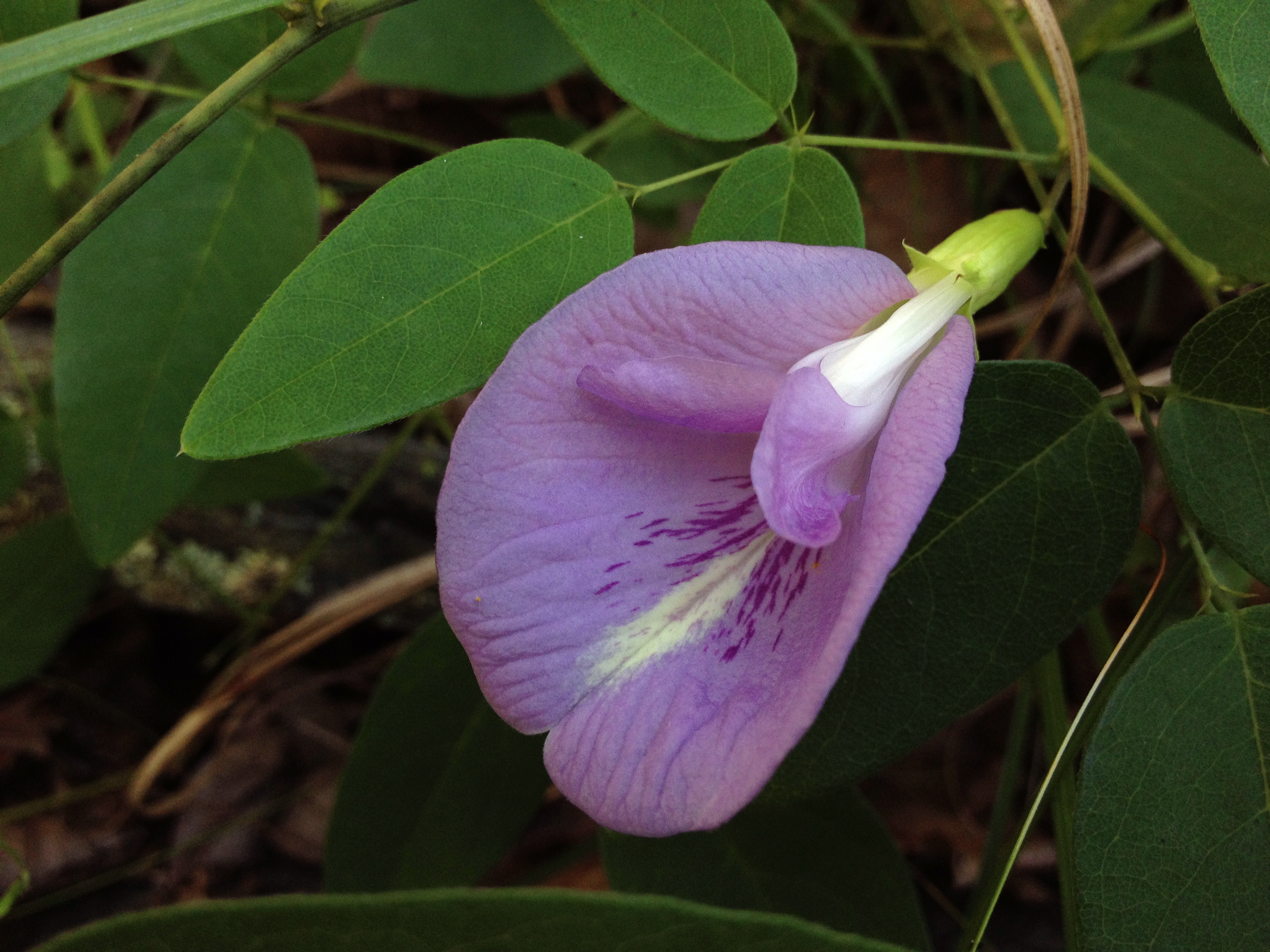

Conservation status
- Secure (NatureServe)

Scientific classification
- Kingdom: Plantae
- Clade: Embryophytes
- Clade: Tracheophytes
- Clade: Spermatophytes
- Clade: Angiosperms
- Clade: Eudicots
- Clade: Rosids
- Order: Fabales
- Family: Fabaceae
- Subfamily: Faboideae
- Genus: Clitoria
- Species: C. mariana

Binomial name
- Clitoria mariana L.

Synonyms
- Martiusia mariana (L.) Small; Nauchea mariana (L.) Descourt. Ternatea mariana (L.) Kuntze; Vexillaria mariana (L.) Raf. Eaton

= Clitoria mariana =

Species of plant

Clitoria mariana, known by the common names butterfly pea and Atlantic pigeon wings, is a perennial herbaceous plant in the pea family, Fabaceae. The plant is native to the United States.

== Description ==
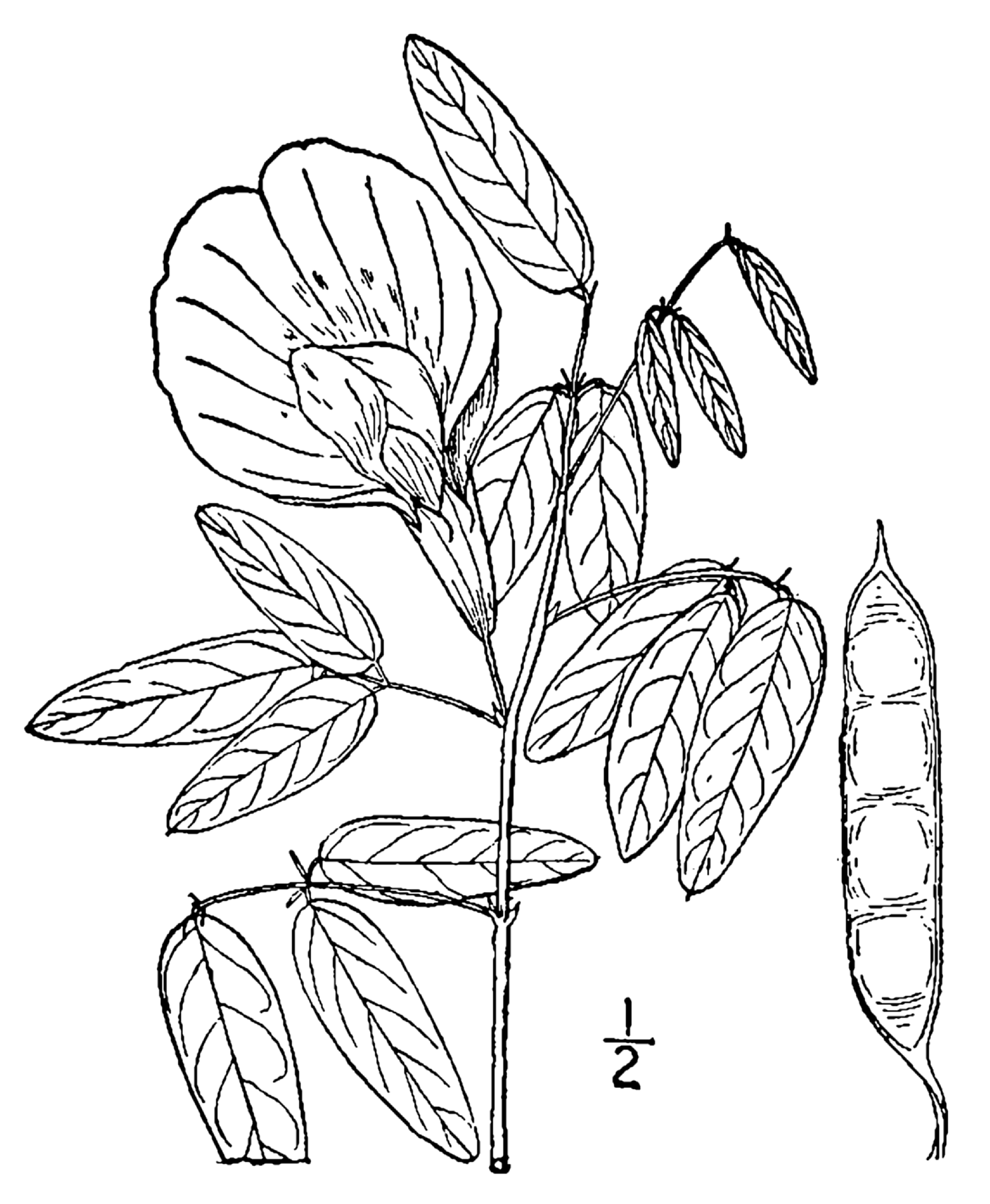
Botanical illustration of Clitoria mariana (1913)

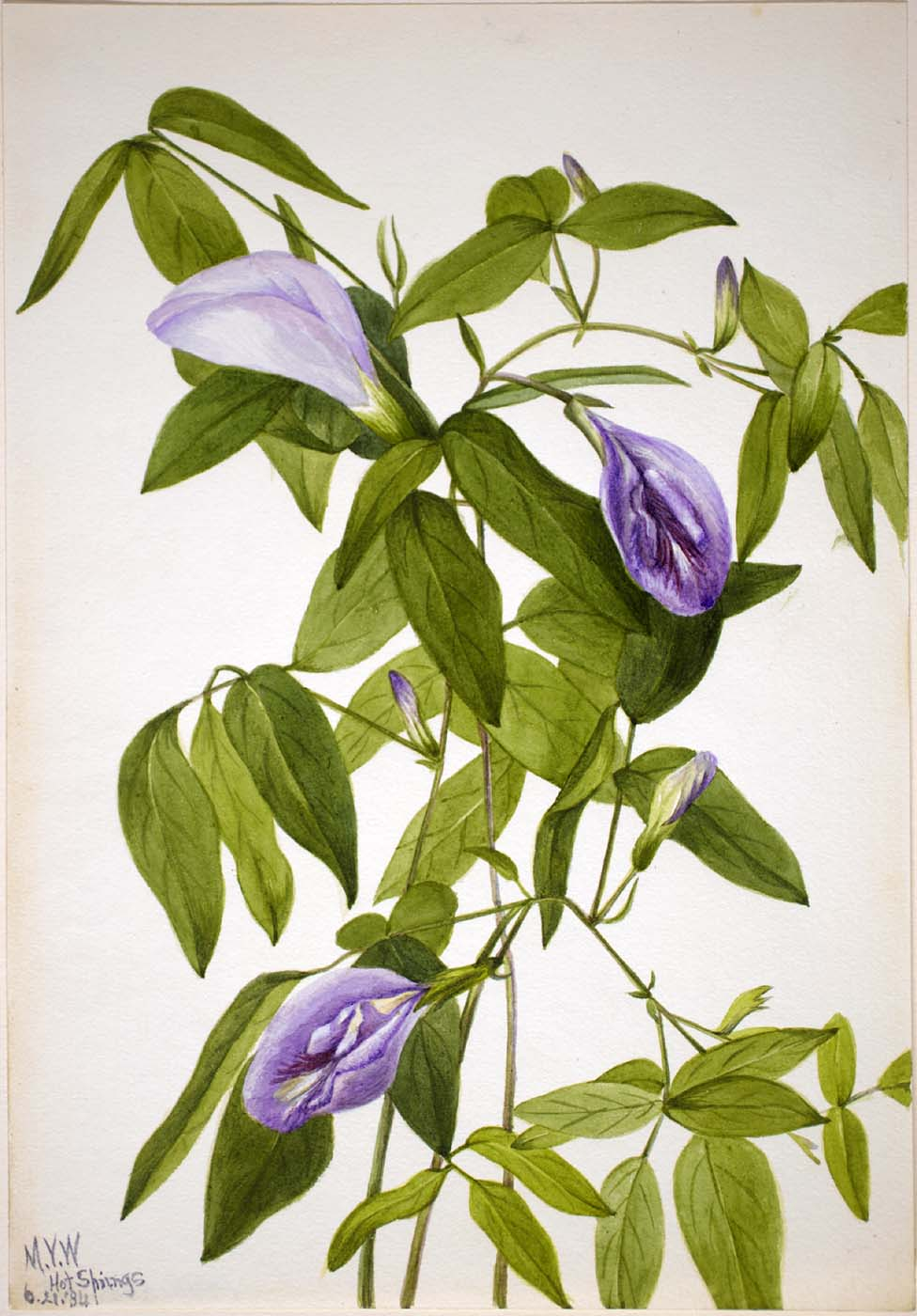
Watercolor of Clitoria mariana by Mary Vaux Walcott (1934, Smithsonian American Art Museum collection).

The ascending, sometimes twining stem of Clitoria mariana is 45 to 60 centimeters long. The leaves are pinnately trifoliate, borne on petioles with stipules. The thin, smooth or slightly hairy leaflets are ovate, 2.5 to 11 centimeters long, and 1.5 to 5 centimeters wide.

It produces purple flowers in summer. The flowers are axillary, usually solitary, and resupinate. The calyx is tubular. The corolla of the flower is about 5 centimeters long, its wings and keel much shorter than the standard.

The fruit is a linear oblong pod, 25 millimeters long and 5 millimeters wide.

This species is similar in appearance to Centrosema virginianum, however, in Clitoria the flower is erect and in Centrosema the flower is upside down and the banner points downward.

== Distribution and habitat ==
The plant is native to the eastern, southern, and central United States west to New Mexico and Arizona. It is also found in Asia, in: Bhutan, India, Laos, Myanmar, Thailand, Vietnam, and southern China (Guangxi, Yunnan).

In the United States it has been recorded in Alabama, Arkansas, Arizona, Washington, D.C., Delaware, Florida, Georgia, Iowa, Illinois, Indiana, Kansas, Kentucky, Louisiana, Maryland, Minnesota, Missouri, Mississippi, North Carolina, Nebraska, New Jersey, New Mexico, New York, Ohio, Oklahoma, Pennsylvania, South Carolina, Tennessee, Texas, Virginia, Wisconsin, and West Virginia.

C. mariana is a facultative upland species. It typically lives in high light areas, but can also tolerate partial shade. It ranges from dry to moist sand soils.

== Ecology ==
It is a larval host to the long-tailed skipper.

== Conservation ==
It is listed as an endangered species by the states of New Jersey and Pennsylvania. The range of Clitoria mariana also includes parts of India, Bhutan, Laos, Myanmar, Thailand, Vietnam, and the Chinese provinces of Guangxi, and Yunnan. In Virginia, it grows in habitats such as dry open forests, shale barrens, and rocky or sandy woodlands. The presence of this species is dependent on appropriate habitat, and it may be eliminated from an area by development, changes in land use, or competition with invasive species.
