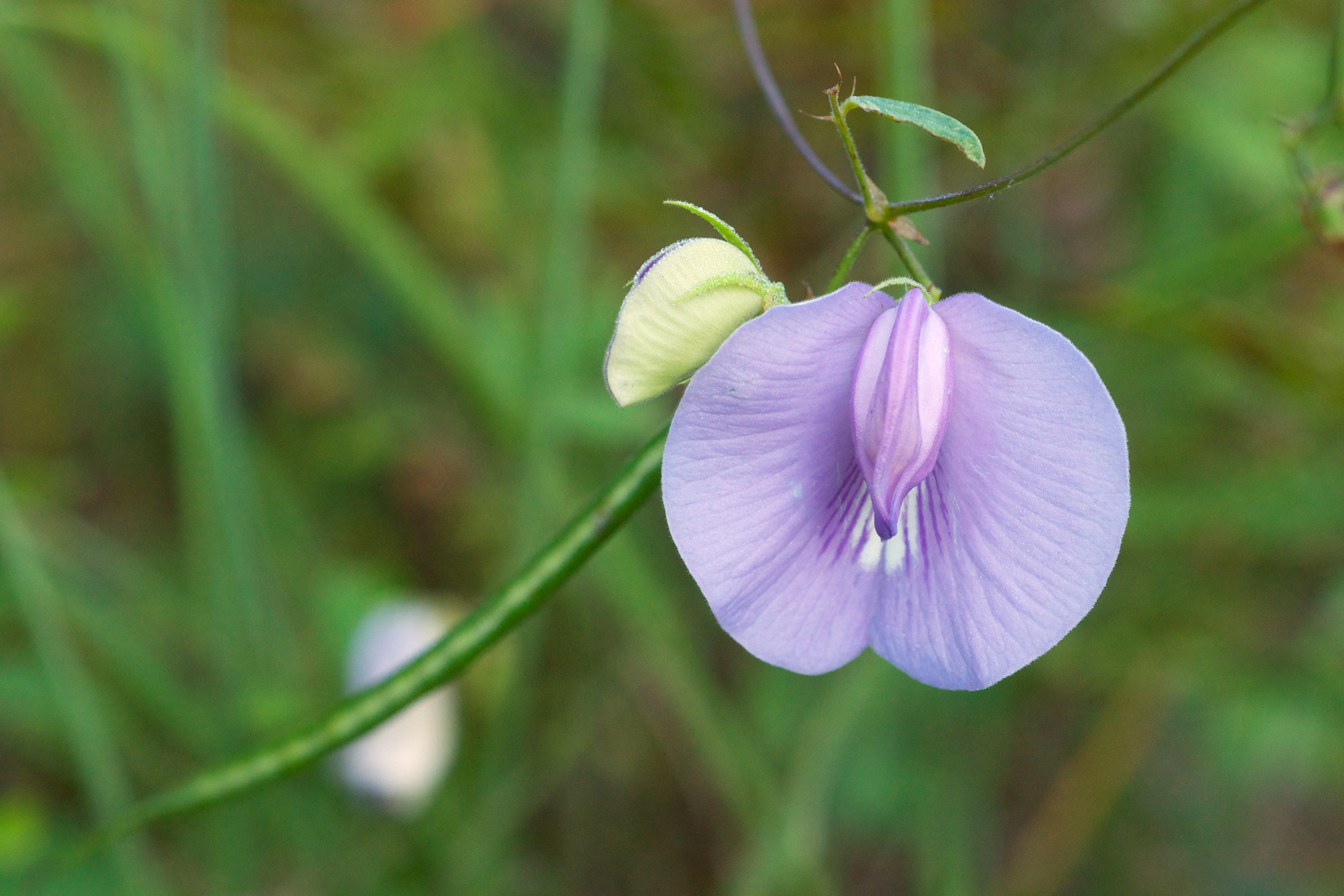

Scientific classification
- Kingdom: Plantae
- Clade: Embryophytes
- Clade: Tracheophytes
- Clade: Angiosperms
- Clade: Eudicots
- Clade: Rosids
- Order: Fabales
- Family: Fabaceae
- Subfamily: Faboideae
- Genus: Centrosema
- Species: C. virginianum

Binomial name
- Centrosema virginianum (L.) Benth.

= Centrosema virginianum =

Species of legume

Centrosema virginianum is known by the common names of spurred butterfly pea, wild blue vine, blue bell, and wild pea. C. virginianum is a member of the family Fabaceae, it is identified by its trailing and twining vine and showy flowers. C. virginianum habitats are in sunny areas within pine lands, and coastal uplands.

== Description ==
Centrosema virginianum is a perennial herbaceous vine growing procumbently or twining to a height approaching two meters. It has alternate pinnately divided leaves, 3 to 10 centimeters long. Leaflets are lanceolate or ovate, 1 to 4 cm long, Stipules are often deciduous, and mostly setaceous. There is a wide range of leaflet forms, from linear to ovate to oblong or lanceolate-oblong, acute or acuminate at the apex. Flowering occurs in the spring and summer.

Flowers of Centrosema virginianum, are highly specialized, with an inverted (resupinate) banner to accommodate pollinators (bees). The inflorescence consists of one to four bisexual flowers on an axillary peduncle; the calyx is deeply five-lobed, and the acute lobes are longer than the tube. The corolla is purplish or lavender-blue to nearly white; the fruit contains four to ten dark brown seeds. The diversity of leaflet shapes and corolla size and color can lead to confusion with C. pubescens. C. virginianum's roots are capable of nitrogen fixation.

== Distribution ==
Centrosema virginianum ranges more or less continuously from Uruguay and northern Argentina to the eastern United States and Bermuda in tropical and subtropical areas. It is widely distributed throughout the West Indies and has become naturalized in tropical West Africa.

== Ecology ==
Centrosema virginianum is a legume with high nitrogen-fixing potential. C. virginianum can tolerate overstory canopies that decrease light levels to about half of the ambient light level, meaning that it can grow in partial shade without significant affect to its nitrogen-fixing capability.

C. virginianum is capable of spreading clonally by production of rhizomes. Its seeds can remain viable in the soil seed bank for up to two years because of their hard seed coats.

As a legume, C. virginianum is high in protein and mineral content, making it attractive to a great variety of herbivorous animal species, including reptiles, mammals, and birds.

C. virginianum thrives under a regular fire regime, and seasonal burning does not negatively affect its nitrogen fixing capabilities.

Its flower is highly specialized for pollination by large insects of the Hymenoptera Order, requiring bees to "trip" the pollen delivery mechanism.

== See also ==
- Clitoria, a vine with which Centrosema virginianum may be confused.
