= Acrocercops clitoriella =

Scientific classification
- Kingdom: Animalia
- Phylum: Arthropoda
- Class: Insecta
- Order: Lepidoptera
- Family: Gracillariidae
- Genus: Acrocercops
- Species: A. clitoriella

Binomial name
- Acrocercops clitoriella Busck, [1934]

Species of moth

Acrocercops clitoriella is a moth of the family Gracillariidae. It is known from Cuba.

The larvae feed on Clitoria species, including Clitoria ternatea. They probably mine the leaves of their host plant.
