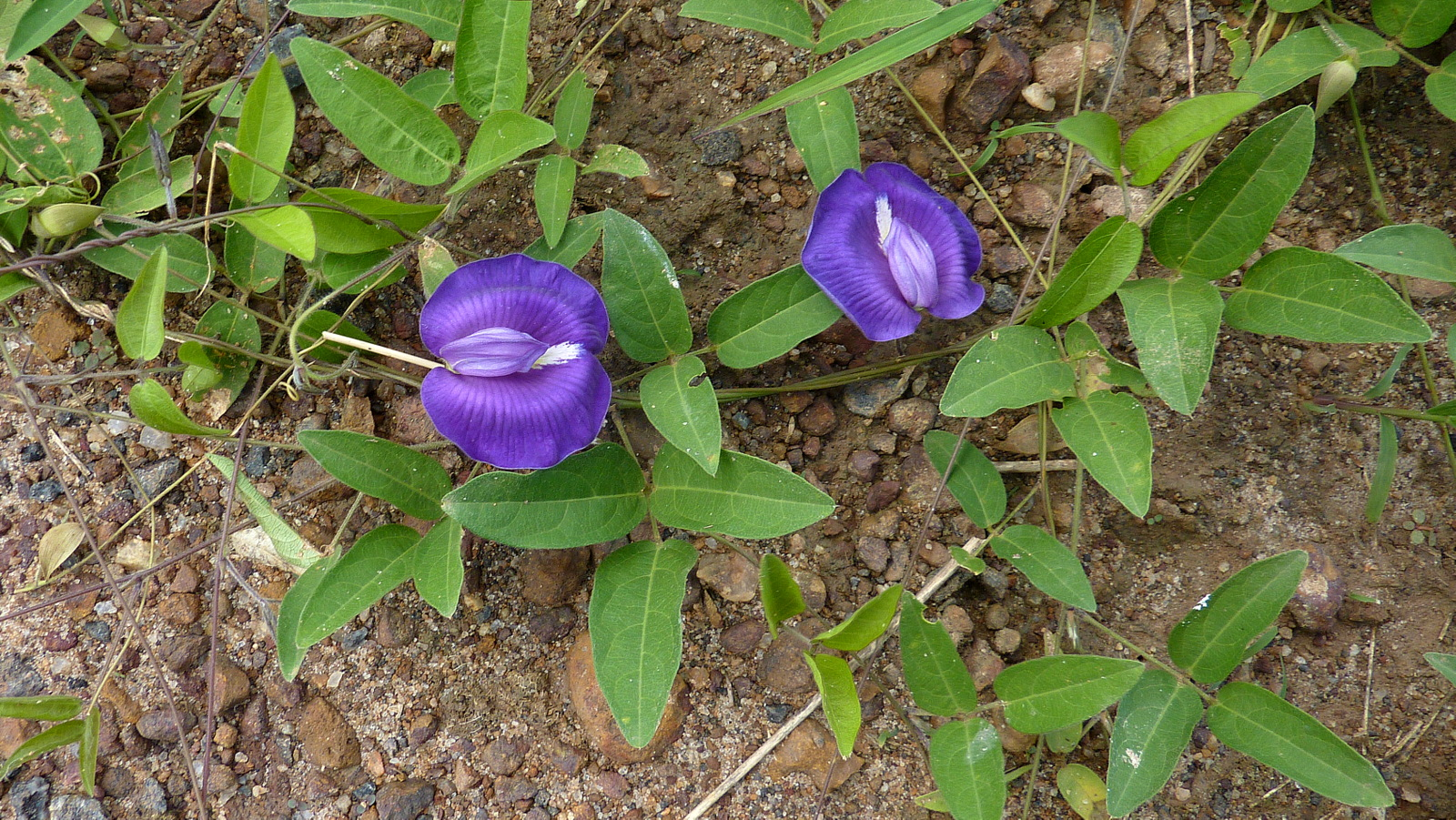

Scientific classification
- Kingdom: Plantae
- Clade: Tracheophytes
- Clade: Angiosperms
- Clade: Eudicots
- Clade: Rosids
- Order: Fabales
- Family: Fabaceae
- Subfamily: Faboideae
- Genus: Centrosema
- Species: C. brasilianum

Binomial name
- Centrosema brasilianum (L.) Benth.

Synonyms
- Bradburya brasiliana (L.) Kuntze; Bradburya insulana (Vell.) Kuntze; Centrosema insulanum (Vell.) Steud.; Clitoria brasiliana L.; Clitoria formosa Kunth; Clitoria nsulana Vell.; Vexillaria brasiliana (L.) Hoffmanns.

= Centrosema brasilianum =

Species of legume

Centrosema brasilianum belongs to the dicot class with a variety of names such as Clitoria brasiliana, and many more. It is a member of the family Fabaceae. This species in mainly found in South American nations such as Brazil, Guyana, and Bolivia.

== Morphology ==
Centrosema brasilianum is a prostrate-trailing to twining, perennial, herbaceous legume. Amongst different studies, some erect and semi-erect forms were identified along with adventitious roots on trailing stems. Leaves are trifoliate, leaflets elliptical-oblong, sometimes ovate, 3.3-6.6 cm long, 1.5-3.6 cm wide. Flower racemes consists of 2-5 flowers, or sometimes solitary. Bracteoles either are glabrous or pubescent, ranging from 3–13 mm long, 12–17 mm long and 5–10 mm wide, ovate and flat or cupped. Peduncles in the leaf axis vary from 4–30 mm long. The papilionate flower is generally violet, violet-blue or red-lilac, and in rare cases also purple or white. Outcrossing may cause a degree of variation in color intensity. From time of sowing to flowering varies between 3–7 months. Pods are linear, dehiscent, 70–160 mm long and 4–5 mm wide, containing roughly 8-23 seeds. Seeds vary from dark to light brown and can sometimes be grey, black or yellow, often with stripes or spotted with a cylindrical shape raging 3.4-4.4 mm long, 2.3-3.1 mm wide.

== Distribution-morphology variation ==
=== Brazil ===
Vines can grow to 2.5 m; leaflets are mid-green, tinged bluish; bracts and bracteoles are greenish tinged purple; flowers are resupinate; upper (= cardinal) calyx lobes slightly longer than the others; corolla is deep purple (varying to pink with streaks of white dependent on location found); standard with a central yellow blotch which is white near its apex.

=== Guyana ===
Centrosema brasilianum found in Guyana consist of twining vines with flowers that are white along with a banner yellow at base.

=== Bolivia ===
Centrosema brasilianum found in Bolivia consists of weak herbs, trailing among grasses, the stems to about 0.5 m long, very inconspicuous, but the flowers very showy; petals blue-purple.

While most reported collections of Centrosema brasilianum are throughout Brazil, other findings vary east, northeast, and north of Brazil in such places such as Venezuela and Colombia. There have also been sightings in Central America, Indian Ocean, and Australia.

== History ==
Centrosema brasilianum was listed as one of the species under Clitoria which are currently accepted as Centrosema, but these species were known to Plukenet (1691). George Bentham (1837) listed 25 species of Centrosema and by 1859 listed another 18 species and then reduced 20 of these to synonyms; establishing C. brasilianum (L.) Benth. as one.

== Ecology ==
=== Soil requirements ===
Centrosema brasilianum native habitat consists of well-drained, acidic to very acidic (ph of 4.1-6.3) soils. This poses an elevated tolerance to high levels of aluminum. Along with its acidic adaptability, medium to low fertility soils are common grounds in which C. brasilianum grows. The limiting nutrient pertaining to Centrosema species is phosphorus, thus recommendations range from 10–40 kg/ha, subject to soil parameters. The species including C. brasilianum entails a minor quantity of magnesium and calcium.

=== Moisture ===
Centrosema brasilianum contains a characteristic, which allows it to have a high tolerance to drought, along with the ability to retain green leaves over extended dry seasons. To control water loss, C. brasilianum uses osmotic and stomatal as its main processes. Centrosema brasilianum drought tolerance is attributed to its deep rooting system.

=== Pests and diseases ===
Centrosema brasilianum is susceptible to rhizoctonia foliar blight (RFB), which may cause yield reductions of up to 50%.

== Forage ==
Centrosema brasilianum forage quality is high and compares favorable with other tropical legumes. Reports of a range of 11.8%-19.6% of crude protein were found in large collections evaluated in Colombia and Nigeria during sampling at ages of 6–18 weeks, respectively. Reports on in vitro dry matter digestibility range from 28-56%. In contrast to many other tropical legumes, C. brasilianum maintains its quality and retains its leaves under drought to a large extent which is an important characteristic when searching for forages for dry environments. Centrosema brasilianum is highly palatable.

== Propagation ==
Establishment and germination of C. brasilianum is generally good. Report indicated that after evaluation of 257- seed accessions, a 40% success rate was established in field germination and 84% in the laboratory. Prior to sowing, scarification is a necessity along with hot water treatment, Osram irradiation and sulphuric acid. Centrosema brasilianum establishes relatively slowly, therefore weed control during establishment is advantageous. Once established, it competes well in grasslands with sowing depths of only 5 cm and seeding rates of 4–5 kg/ha.

== Practical info ==
While C. pubescens has been the most commercialized legume of the genus Centrosema, other species have shown good potential. Studies are probably not necessary on stratification methods since much can be extrapolated from existing experience and current methods of management. With weeds being a major problem at establishment, research is required to identify effective and low cost weed control programs along with fertilizer requirements. The greatest gap to overcome is providing a framework for developing a strategy of grazing management that is applicable to a wide range of climatic and edaphic conditions.
