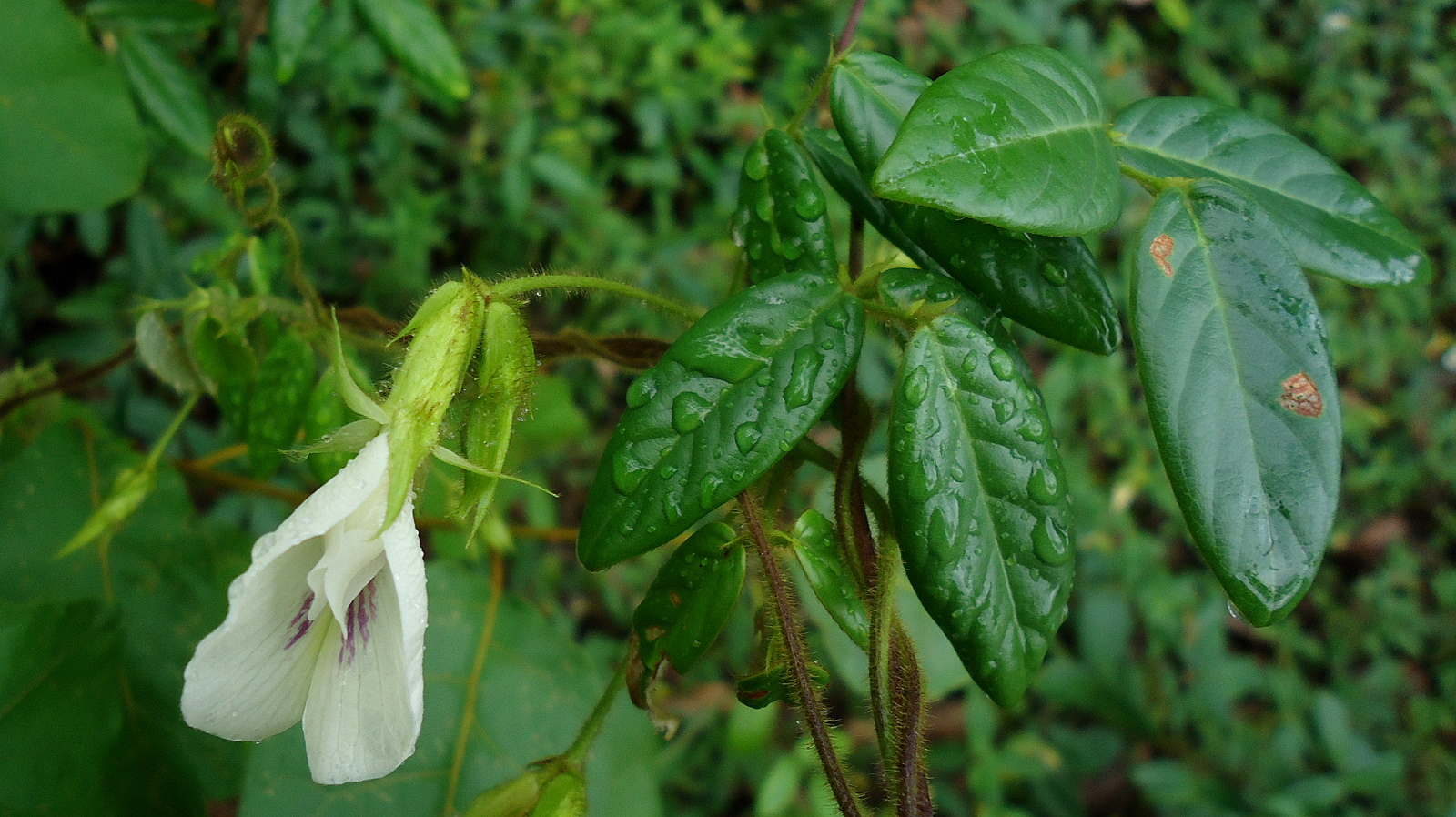

Scientific classification
- Kingdom: Plantae
- Clade: Tracheophytes
- Clade: Angiosperms
- Clade: Eudicots
- Clade: Rosids
- Order: Fabales
- Family: Fabaceae
- Subfamily: Faboideae
- Genus: Clitoria
- Species: C. falcata

Binomial name
- Clitoria falcata Lam.

= Clitoria falcata =

Species of legume

Clitoria falcata is a plant of the genus Clitoria native to South and Central America.
