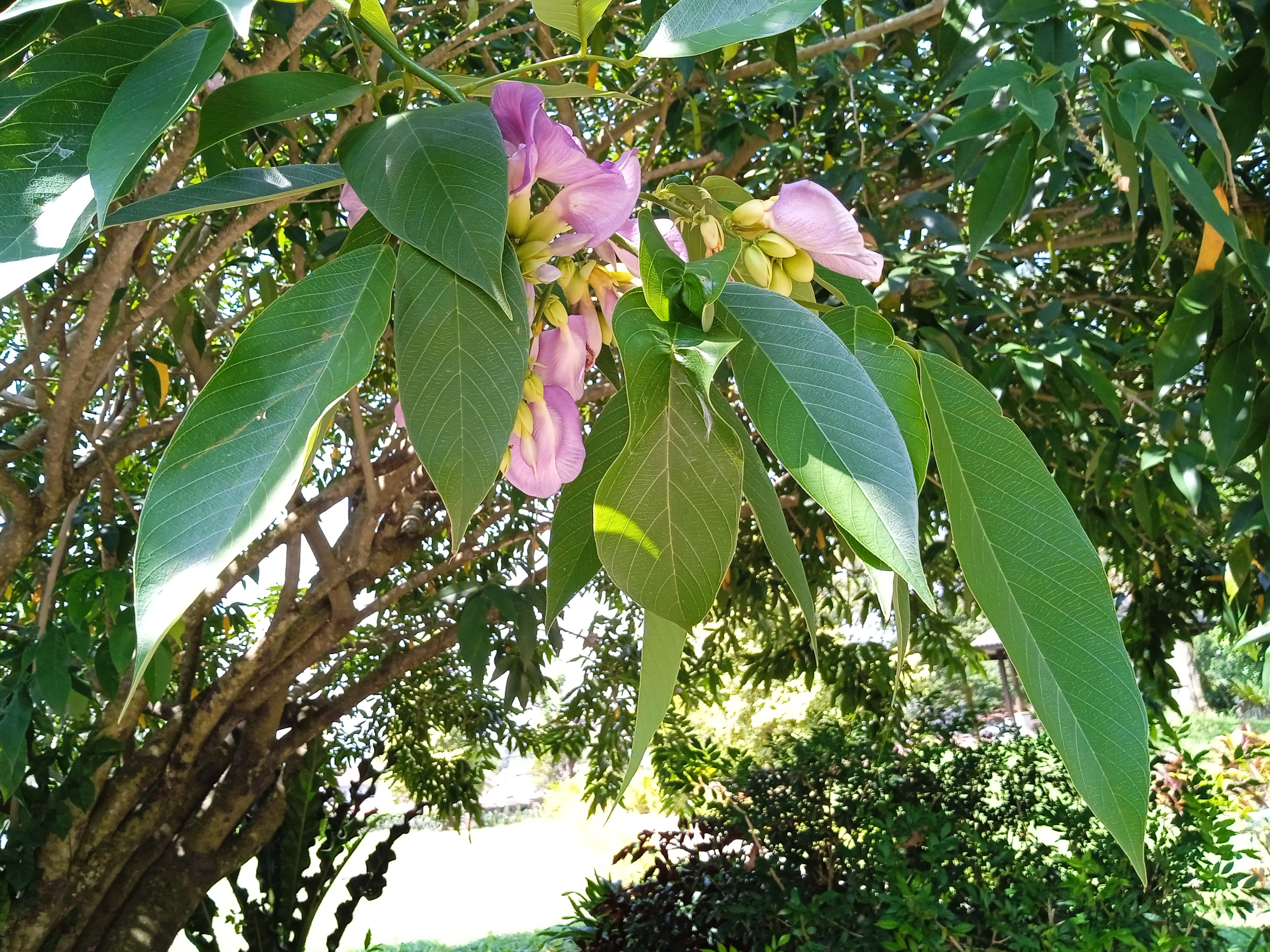

Scientific classification
- Kingdom: Plantae
- Clade: Tracheophytes
- Clade: Angiosperms
- Clade: Eudicots
- Clade: Rosids
- Order: Fabales
- Family: Fabaceae
- Subfamily: Faboideae
- Genus: Clitoria
- Species: C. fairchildiana

Binomial name
- Clitoria fairchildiana R. A. Howard

= Clitoria fairchildiana =

Species of legume

Clitoria fairchildiana, the sombreiro, is a flowering plant species in the genus Clitoria found in Campina Grande, Brazil.

The rotenoids clitoriacetal, stemonacetal, 6-deoxyclitoriacetal, 11-deoxyclitoriacetal, 9-demethylclitoriacetal and stemonal can be isolated from C. fairchildiana.

== Gallery ==
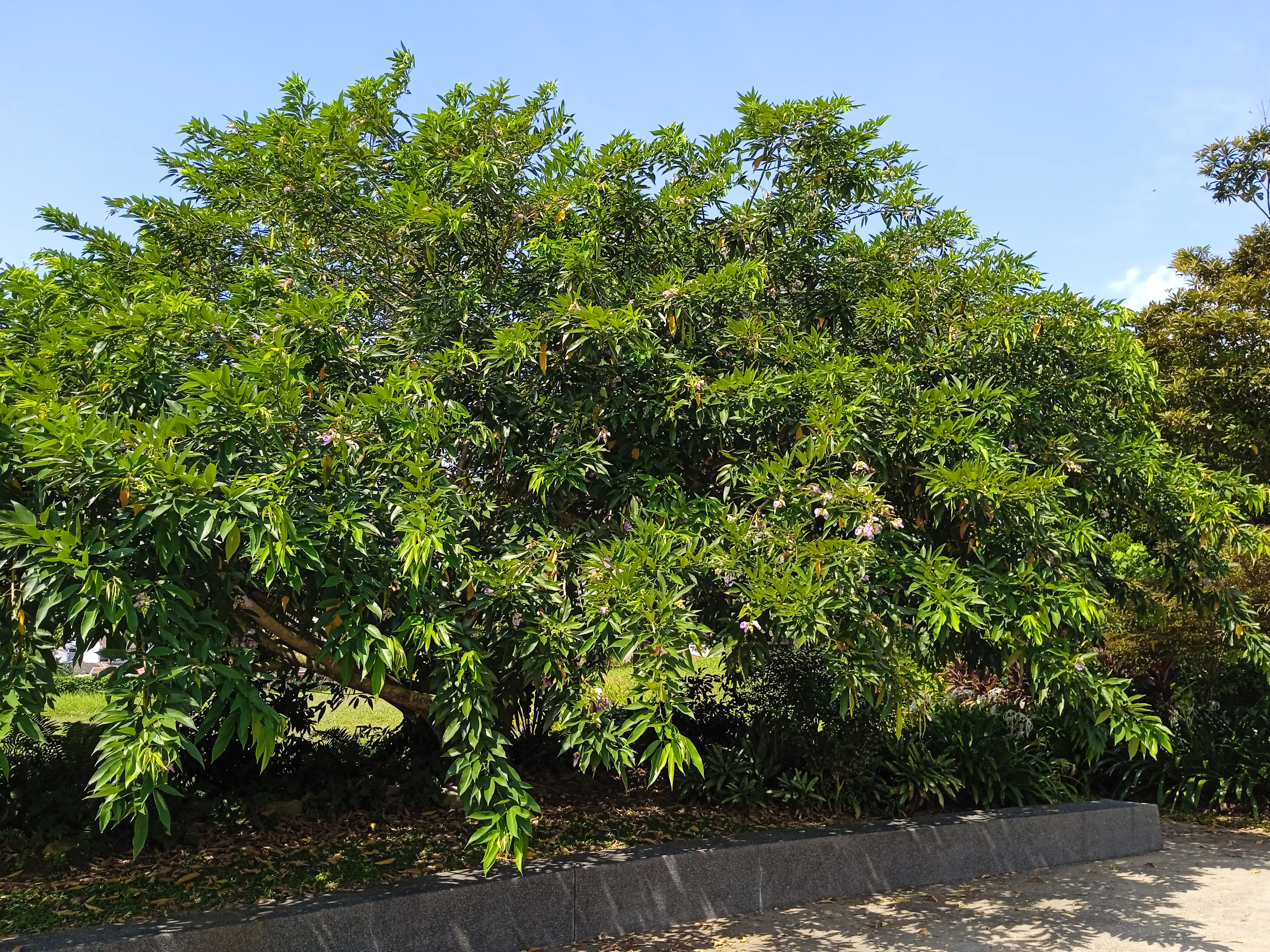
Tree

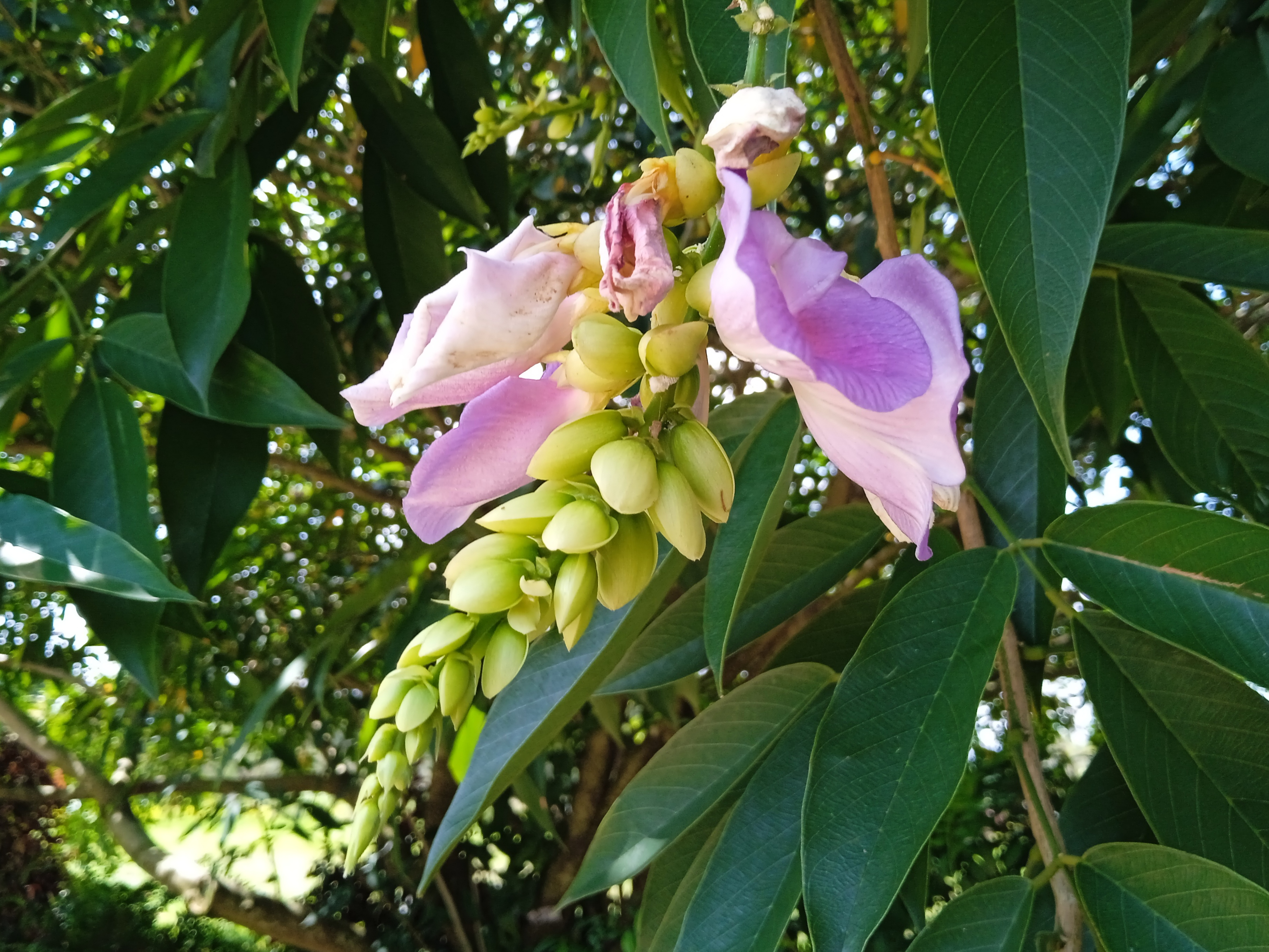
Flower

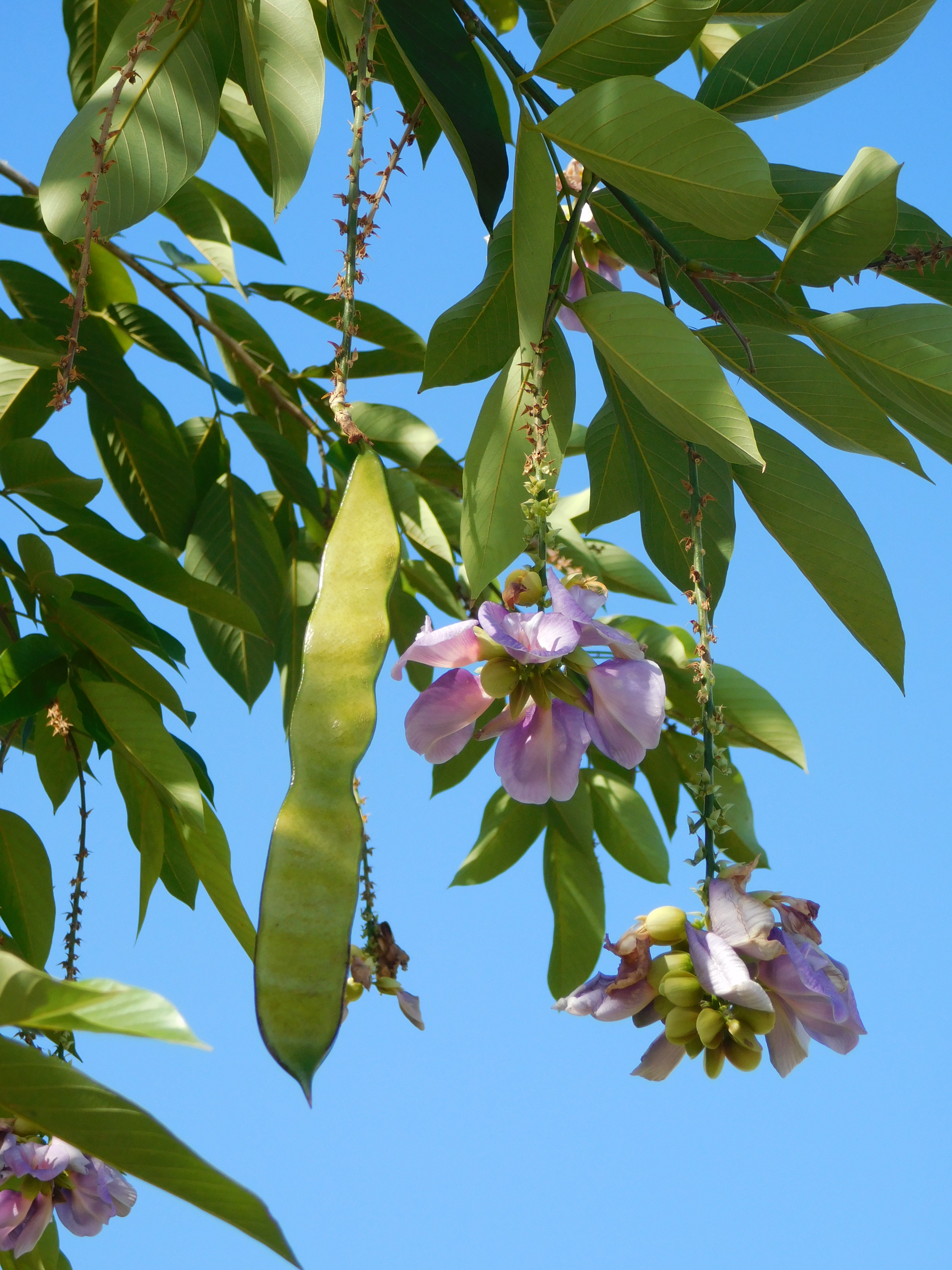
Flower
