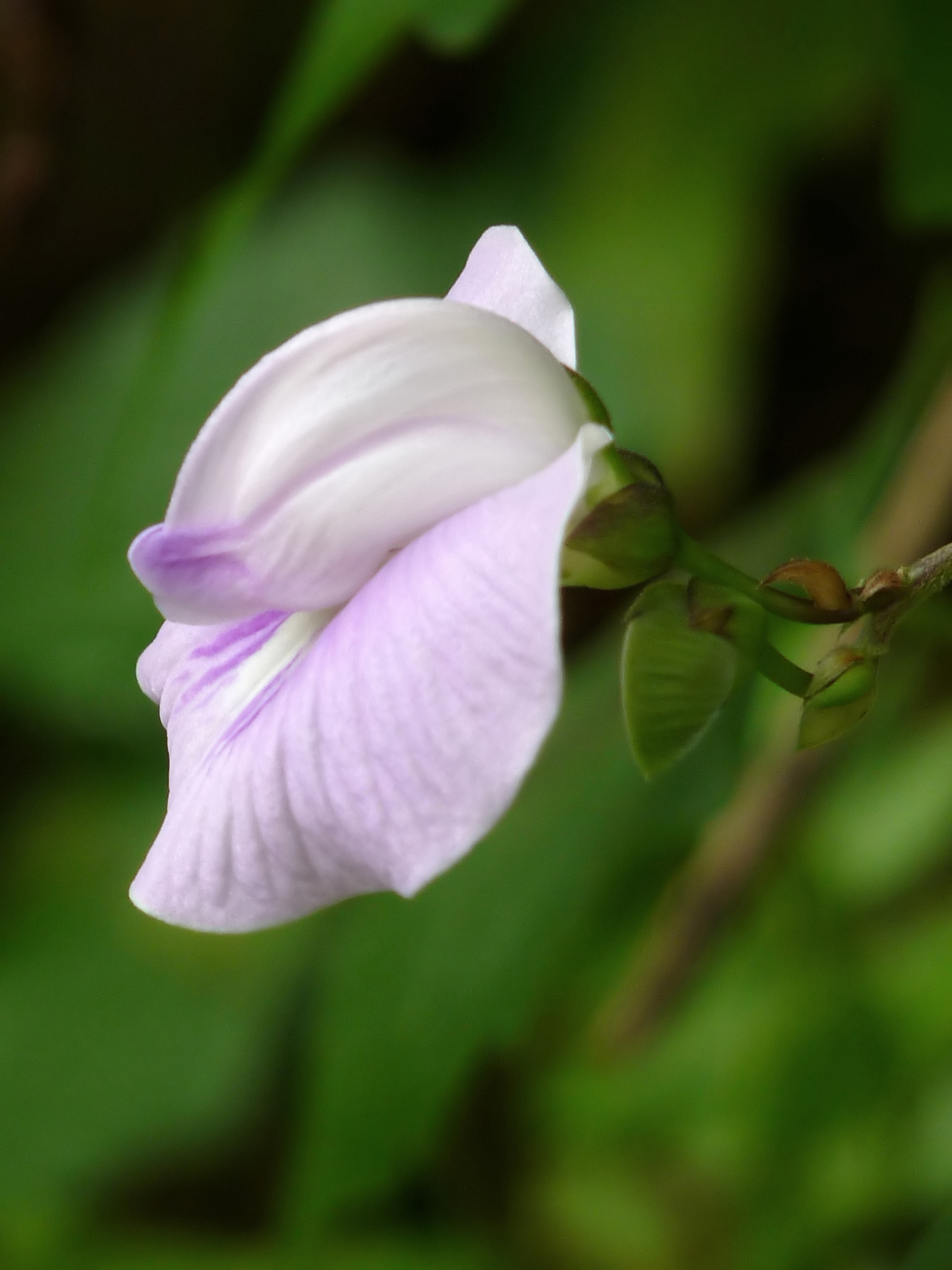
- Centrosema pubescens

Scientific classification
- Kingdom: Plantae
- Clade: Embryophytes
- Clade: Tracheophytes
- Clade: Spermatophytes
- Clade: Angiosperms
- Clade: Eudicots
- Clade: Rosids
- Order: Fabales
- Family: Fabaceae
- Subfamily: Faboideae
- Tribe: Phaseoleae
- Subtribe: Clitoriinae
- Genus: Centrosema (DC.) Benth.

Type species
- Centrosema brasilianum (L.) Benth.

Species
- 45, see text

Synonyms
- Bradburya Raf.; Cruminium Desv.; Platysema Benth.; Steganotropis Lehm.; Vexillaria Benth., nom. illeg.

= Centrosema =

Genus of legumes

Centrosema, the butterfly peas, is a genus of vines in the legume family (Fabaceae). It includes 45 species, which are native to tropical and sub-tropical Americas from the southern United States to northern Argentina.

The following is a list of all accepted species as of 29 May 2025:

- Centrosema acutifolium Benth.
- Centrosema angustifolium (Kunth) Benth.
- Centrosema arenarium Benth.
- Centrosema arenicola (Small) F.J.Herm.
- Centrosema bellum Vilchez
- Centrosema bifidum Benth.
- Centrosema brachypodum Benth.
- Centrosema bracteosum Benth.
- Centrosema brasilianum (L.) Benth.
- Centrosema capitatum (Rich.) Amshoff
- Centrosema carajasense Cavalc.
- Centrosema coriaceum Benth.
- Centrosema dasyanthum Benth.
- Centrosema fasciculatum Benth.
- Centrosema flavescens Carnevali, Duno & Angulo
- Centrosema grandiflorum Benth.
- Centrosema grazielae V.P.Barbosa
- Centrosema haitense Urb. & Ekman
- Centrosema heptaphyllum Moric.
- Centrosema heteroneurum (Standl.) Standl.
- Centrosema jaraguaense Hoehne
- Centrosema kermesi Burkart
- Centrosema latidens Killip & J.F.Macbr.
- Centrosema lucia-helenae Brandão & Gavil.
- Centrosema macranthum Hoehne
- Centrosema macrocarpum Benth.
- Centrosema molle Mart. ex Benth.
- Centrosema pascuorum Mart. ex Benth.
- Centrosema platycarpum Benth.
- Centrosema plumieri (Turpin ex Pers.) Benth.
- Centrosema pubescens Benth.
- Centrosema rotundifolium Mart. ex Benth.
- Centrosema sagittatum (Humb. & Bonpl. ex Willd.) Brandegee
- Centrosema schottii (Millsp.) K.Schum.
- Centrosema sericiflorum K.L.Barreto & L.P.Queiroz
- Centrosema tapirapoanense Hoehne
- Centrosema teresae Brandão & Sousa Costa
- Centrosema tetragonolobum R.Schultze-Kraft & R.J.Williams
- Centrosema triquetrum (Hoffmanns. ex Benth.) Benth.
- Centrosema unifoliatum (Rose) Lundell
- Centrosema variifolium Burkart
- Centrosema venosum Mart. ex Benth.
- Centrosema vetulum Mart. ex Benth.
- Centrosema vexillatum Benth.
- Centrosema virginianum (L.) Benth.

Lepidopteran caterpillars that feed on butterfly peas include the two-barred flasher (Astraptes fulgerator), occasionally recorded on C. macrocarpum and C. plumieri at least.

Another plant referred to as butterfly pea from the same subtribe Clitoriinae is the related Clitoria ternatea. However it doesn't belong to the genus Centrosema.

In Jamaica, it is known as Fee Fee and is usually seen at Christmas time. The flower is able to make a whistling sound hence children usually find it useful as a toy.

== See also ==
- Clitoria
