= Clitoria brachystegia =

Conservation status
- Endangered (IUCN 3.1)

Scientific classification
- Kingdom: Plantae
- Clade: Tracheophytes
- Clade: Angiosperms
- Clade: Eudicots
- Clade: Rosids
- Order: Fabales
- Family: Fabaceae
- Subfamily: Faboideae
- Genus: Clitoria
- Species: C. brachystegia

Binomial name
- Clitoria brachystegia Benth.

Species of legume

Clitoria brachystegia is a species of flowering plant in the family Fabaceae. It is found only in Ecuador. Its natural habitat is subtropical or tropical dry forests.
