= Clitoria moyobambensis =

Conservation status
- Vulnerable (IUCN 2.3)

Scientific classification
- Kingdom: Plantae
- Clade: Tracheophytes
- Clade: Angiosperms
- Clade: Eudicots
- Clade: Rosids
- Order: Fabales
- Family: Fabaceae
- Subfamily: Faboideae
- Genus: Clitoria
- Species: C. moyobambensis

Binomial name
- Clitoria moyobambensis Fantz

Species of plant

Clitoria moyobambensis is a species of legume in the family Fabaceae. It is found only in Peru.
