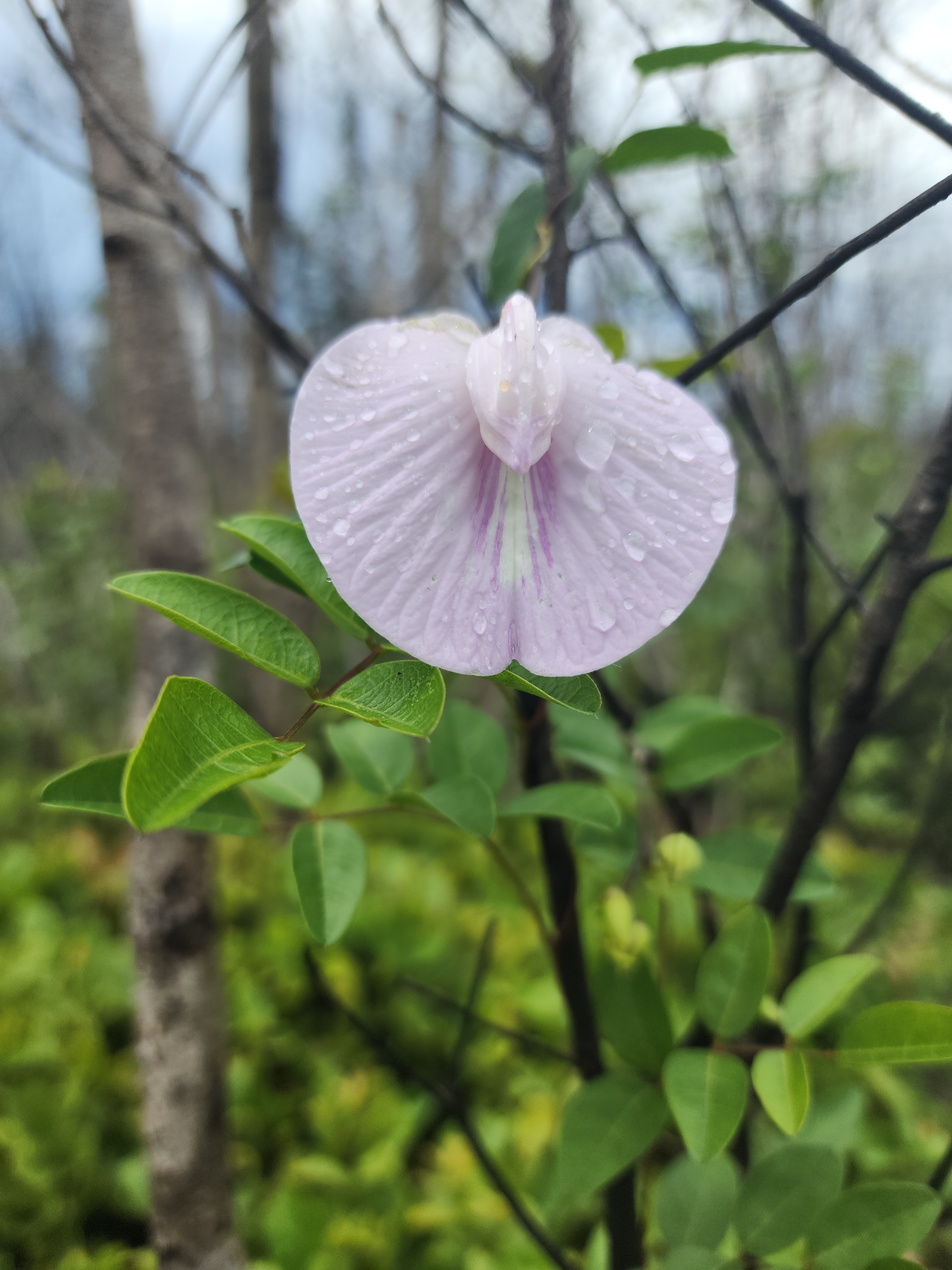
- Blooming in a portion of recently burned scrubby flatwood

Conservation status
- Imperiled (NatureServe)

Scientific classification
- Kingdom: Plantae
- Clade: Tracheophytes
- Clade: Angiosperms
- Clade: Eudicots
- Clade: Rosids
- Order: Fabales
- Family: Fabaceae
- Subfamily: Faboideae
- Genus: Centrosema
- Species: C. arenicola

Binomial name
- Centrosema arenicola (Small)F.J.Herm.

= Centrosema arenicola =

Species of flowering plant

Centrosema arenicola, commonly referred to as pineland butterfly-pea or sand butterfly-pea, is a rare species of vining flowering plant endemic to the central region of peninsular Florida, USA.

== Habitat ==
It only occurs in the sandy, fire-dependent pine habitats of the central peninsula; primarily longleaf pine sandhill and scrubby flatwoods.

== Conservation ==
The species' primary threat is habitat loss from development for real estate and agriculture.

== Gallery ==
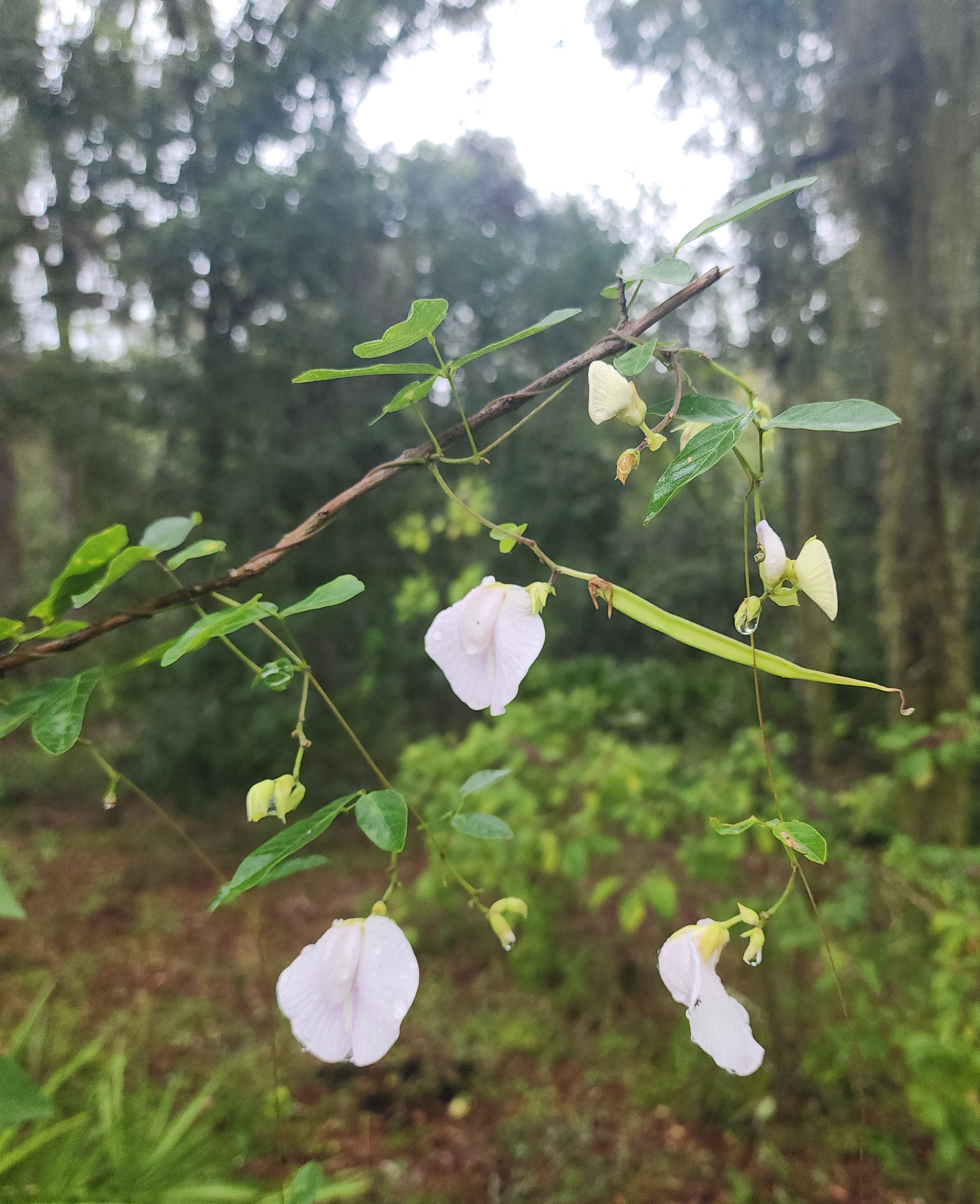
Specimen in bloom and in fruit on the margins of a longleaf pine sandhill
