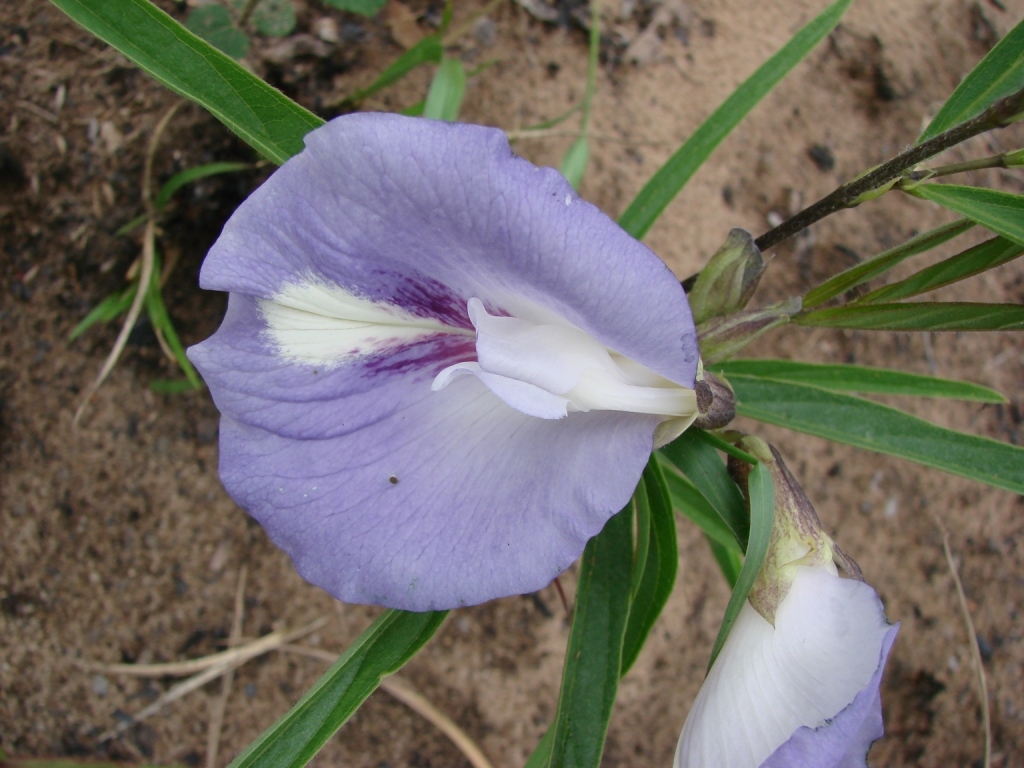

Scientific classification
- Kingdom: Plantae
- Clade: Tracheophytes
- Clade: Angiosperms
- Clade: Eudicots
- Clade: Rosids
- Order: Fabales
- Family: Fabaceae
- Subfamily: Faboideae
- Genus: Clitoria
- Species: C. guianensis

Binomial name
- Clitoria guianensis (Aubl.) Benth. 1858

= Clitoria guianensis =

Species of legume

Clitoria guianensis is a plant of the genus Clitoria native to Brazil.
