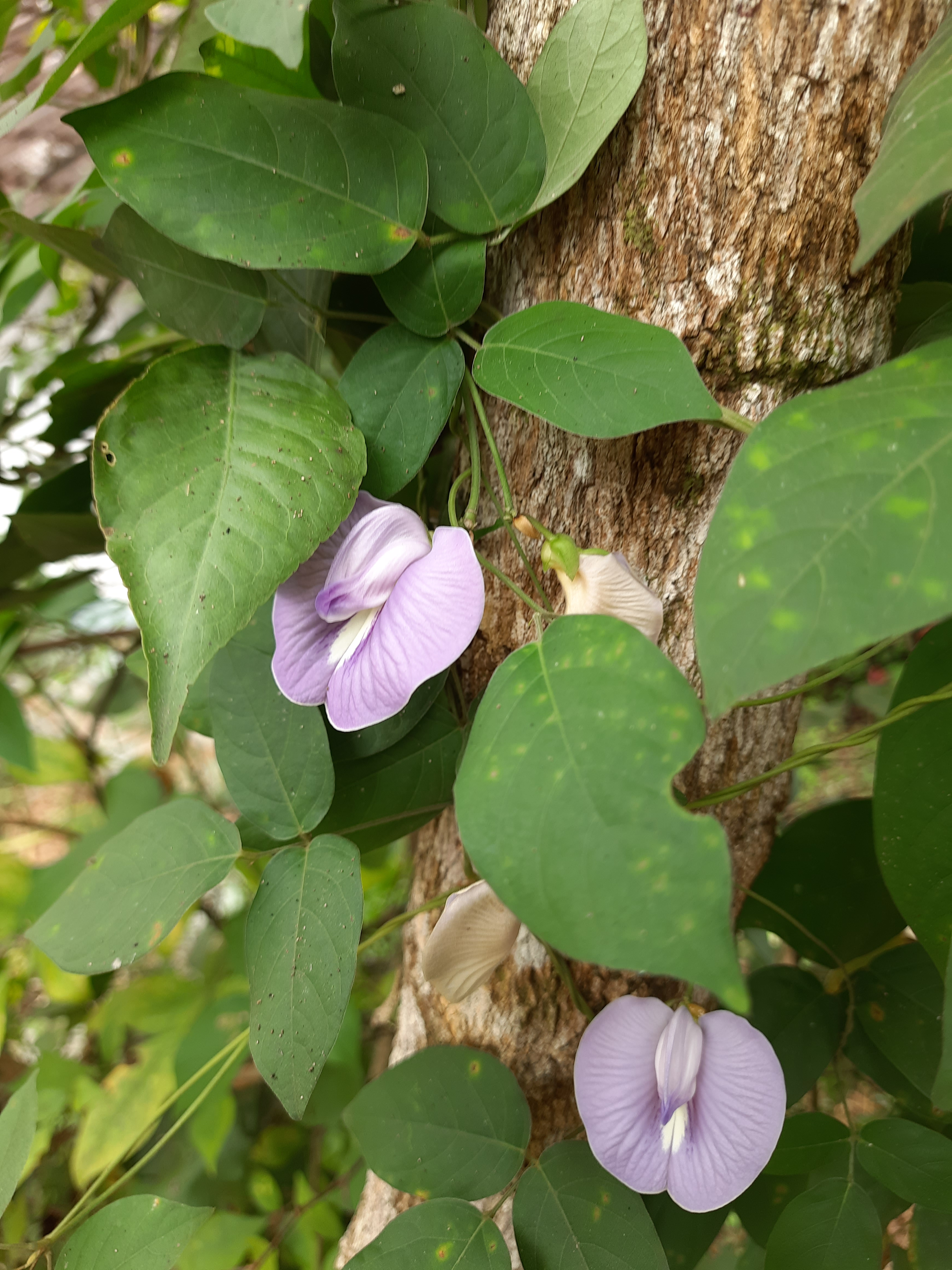

Scientific classification
- Kingdom: Plantae
- Clade: Tracheophytes
- Clade: Angiosperms
- Clade: Eudicots
- Clade: Rosids
- Order: Fabales
- Family: Fabaceae
- Subfamily: Faboideae
- Genus: Centrosema
- Species: C. molle

Binomial name
- Centrosema molle Mart. ex Benth.

= Centrosema molle =

Species of legume

Centrosema molle, the soft butterfly pea or spurred butterfly pea, is a perennial climbing herb in the legume family Fabaceae. Native to regions from southern Mexico through Central and South America, the species is distributed across countries including Brazil, Colombia, Venezuela, and much of the Caribbean, and has been introduced to parts of Asia and the Pacific such as India, Sri Lanka, Thailand, and Samoa. It typically inhabits seasonally dry tropical biomes, thriving in forests, savannas, shrublands, and grasslands. The plant is characterized by its twining habit, three-foliolate velvety leaves, and mauve-purple flowers with a distinctive spur above the claw of the standard petal. The pods are linear and ribbed, reaching up to 17 cm in length. E. molle is used environmentally, particularly for soil improvement and ground cover, and serves as forage for animals.
