= Jean-Théodore Descourtilz =

French naturalist, painter and illustrator (1796–1855)

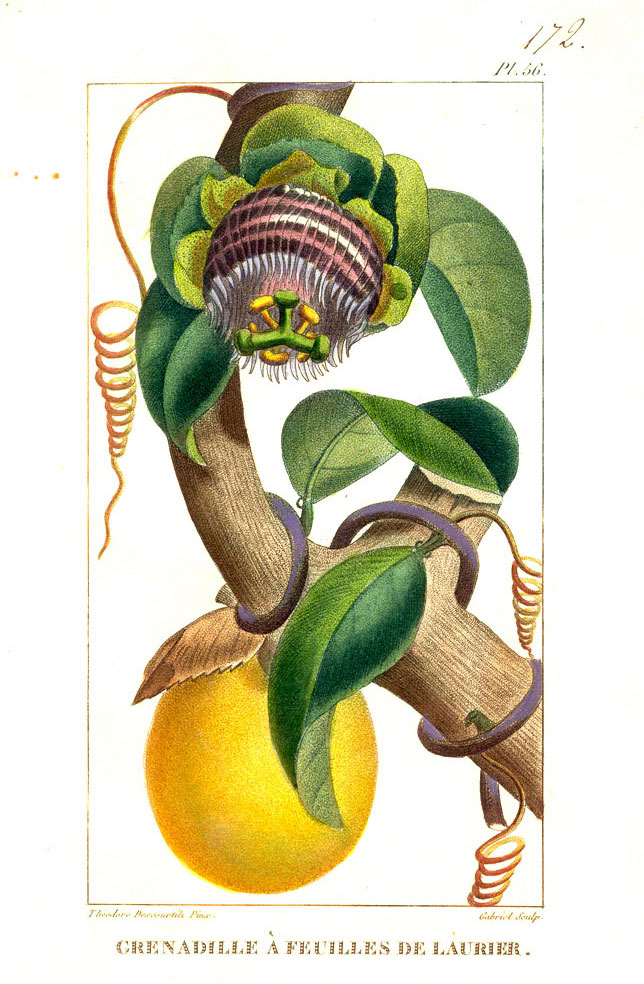
Passiflora laurifolia from Flore Medicale des Antilles

Jean-Theodore Descourtilz (1796 or 1798 – 13 January 1855 in Riacho das Almas) was a French naturalist, painter and illustrator, the son of botanist Michel Étienne Descourtilz (1775-1835). Jean-Theodore was a noted ornithological artist who published Oiseaux brillans du Bresil in Paris in 1834, and did the plant illustrations for his father's Flore Medicale des Antilles published between 1821 and 1829.

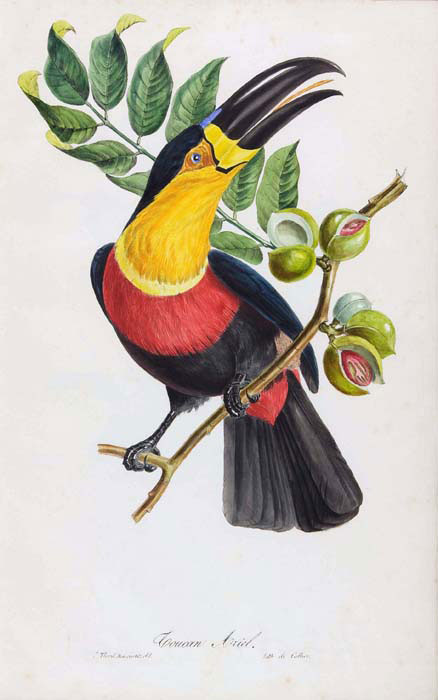
Ramphastos vitellinus Oiseaux Brillians du Bresil

He arrived in Brazil in about 1826, since in 1831 his lavishly illustrated manuscript on the hummingbirds of São Paulo and Rio de Janeiro was acquired by the library of the National Museum. In this work, referring to a particular hummingbird, he states that it was a species so rare that in five years of research he collected only two specimens. Descourtilz was an interested and meticulous observer, concerned about the accuracy of his notes which concisely described the habits and appearance of each species. His poetic and flowery text was in keeping with the period, and was invariably accompanied by colour plates of the species studied.

Ornithologie Bresilienne ou Histoire des Oiseaux du Bresil describes and figures 164 species of Brazilian birds, 15 species and 1 genus new to science. Four parts of the work appeared, each with 12 plates by Descourtilz, before his sudden death in 1855. The plates were prepared in London, and apparently printed by Waterlow and Sons and also Joseph Masters and Co.

In the late 1840s or early 1850s he was sent by the Government to the province of Espírito Santo to investigate the animal life and to report on precious minerals. He discovered traces of gold and iron in the vicinity of the village Laurinha, created by the provincial government to house and proselytise the Puri Indians. However, the ill-treatment suffered by the Indians drove them away and led to the decay of the village. At the site there was a village that eventually became the city of Conceição do Castelo on the headwaters of the Rio Castelo, a tributary of the Itapemirim. Descourtilz explored the city of Itapemirim and nearby towns, gathering various minerals and a collection of crystals, all lodged with the National Museum of Rio de Janeiro, where he took up an appointment in 1854.

Descourtilz was a member of the Société Linnéenne de Paris and of the Société Auxiliaire de l'Industrie de Rio de Janeiro. He died of arsenic poisoning caused by chemicals he used in the preparation of specimens.
