= Clitoria woytkowskii =

Conservation status
- Vulnerable (IUCN 2.3)

Scientific classification
- Kingdom: Plantae
- Clade: Tracheophytes
- Clade: Angiosperms
- Clade: Eudicots
- Clade: Rosids
- Order: Fabales
- Family: Fabaceae
- Subfamily: Faboideae
- Genus: Clitoria
- Species: C. woytkowskii

Binomial name
- Clitoria woytkowskii Fantz

Species of plant

Clitoria woytkowskii is a species of flowering plant in the family Fabaceae. It is found only in Peru.
