= Michel Étienne Descourtilz =

Michel Étienne Descourtilz (25 November 1775, Boiste near Pithiviers – 1835 or 1836, Paris), was a French medical doctor, botanist and historian of the Haitian Revolution. He was the father of illustrator Jean-Théodore Descourtilz, with whom he sometimes collaborated.

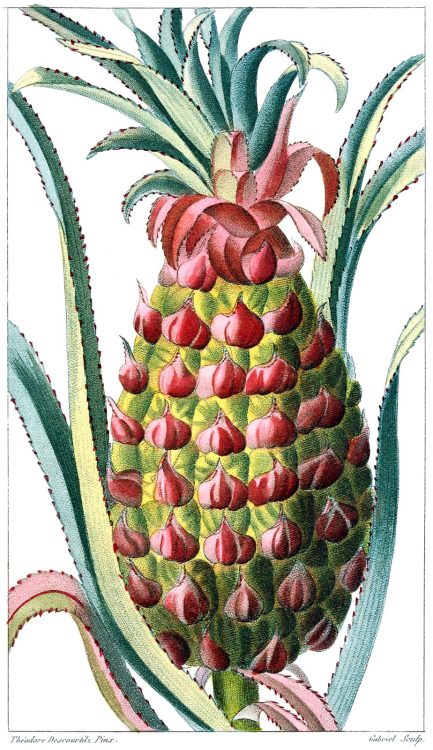
Plate of a pineapple from Descourtiz, 1877

In 1799, after completing his medical studies he traveled to Charleston, South Carolina and Santiago, Cuba, arriving in Haiti on 2 April. Despite a passport from Toussaint Louverture and serving as physician with the forces of Jean-Jacques Dessalines, he was in constant danger. His plant collections were mostly from between Port-au-Prince and Cap-Haïtien and along the Artibonite River. All his natural history collections and many drawings were destroyed during the course of the revolution. In 1803 he returned to France, worked as a physician in a hospital at Beaumont and served as president of the Paris Linnean Society.

As a taxonomist he circumscribed the genus Nauchea (family Fabaceae).

== Bibliography ==
- Flore pittoresque et médicale des Antilles, ou, Histoire naturelle des plantes usuelles des colonies françaises, anglaises, espagnoles et portugaises; par M.E. Descourtilz. Peinte par J. Th. Descourtilz. Vols. 1-8
- Voyages d'un naturaliste, et ses observations faites sur les trois règnes de la nature, dans plusieurs ports de mer français, en Espagne, au continent de l'Amérique Septentrionale, à Saint Yago de Cub. Vols.1-3
- Complete bibliography on WorldCat.
- Descourtilz, Michel Étienne, 2021. Flore médicale des Antilles. New edition established by César Delnatte, ethnobotanist. (Collection de la Fondation Clément). Bordeaux, Hervé Chopin. 245 p. 100 tables reproduced.

== Sources and references ==
- Biography in French with bibliography from the Dictionnaire encyclopédique des sciences médicales.
- Urban, Ignaz. Notae biographicae, Symb. Antill. 3:36,1900.
