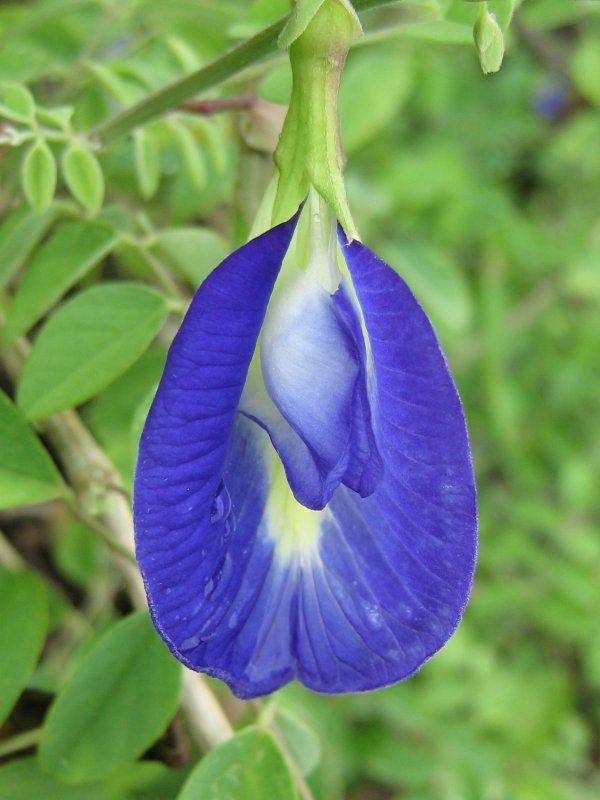
- Clitoria ternatea

Scientific classification
- Kingdom: Plantae
- Clade: Tracheophytes
- Clade: Angiosperms
- Clade: Eudicots
- Clade: Rosids
- Order: Fabales
- Family: Fabaceae
- Subfamily: Faboideae
- Clade: Millettioids
- Tribe: Phaseoleae
- Subtribe: Clitoriinae
- Genus: Clitoria; L.

Species
- 66; see text.

Synonyms
- Clitoriastrum Heist. (1748), not validly publ.; Macrotrullion Klotzsch (1849), nom. nud.; Martia Leandro (1819 publ. 1821), nom. illeg.; Martiusia Schult. (1822); Nauchea J.T.Descourt. (1826); Neurocarpum Desv., (1813); Rhombifolium Rich. ex DC. (1825); Ternatea Mill., (1825), not validly publ.; Vexillaria Eaton (1817), nom. superfl.

= Clitoria =

Genus of legumes

Clitoria is a genus of mainly tropical and subtropical, insect-pollinated flowering pea vines.

== Taxonomy ==
=== Naming of the genus ===
This genus was named after the human clitoris, for the flowers bear a resemblance to the vulva. The first reference to the genus, which includes an illustration of the plant, was made in 1678 by Jakób Breyne, a Polish naturalist, who described it as Flos clitoridis ternatensibus, meaning 'Ternatean flower of the clitoris'. Many vernacular names of these flowers in different languages are similarly based on references to female external genitalia.

Controversies existed in the past among botanists regarding the good taste of the naming of the genus. The analogy drew sharp criticism from botanists such as James Edward Smith in 1807, Amos Eaton in 1817, Michel Étienne Descourtilz in 1826, and Eaton and Wright in 1840. Some less explicit alternatives, like Vexillaria (Eaton 1817) and Nauchea (Descourtilz 1826), were proposed, but they failed to prosper, and the name Clitoria has survived to this day.

=== Species ===
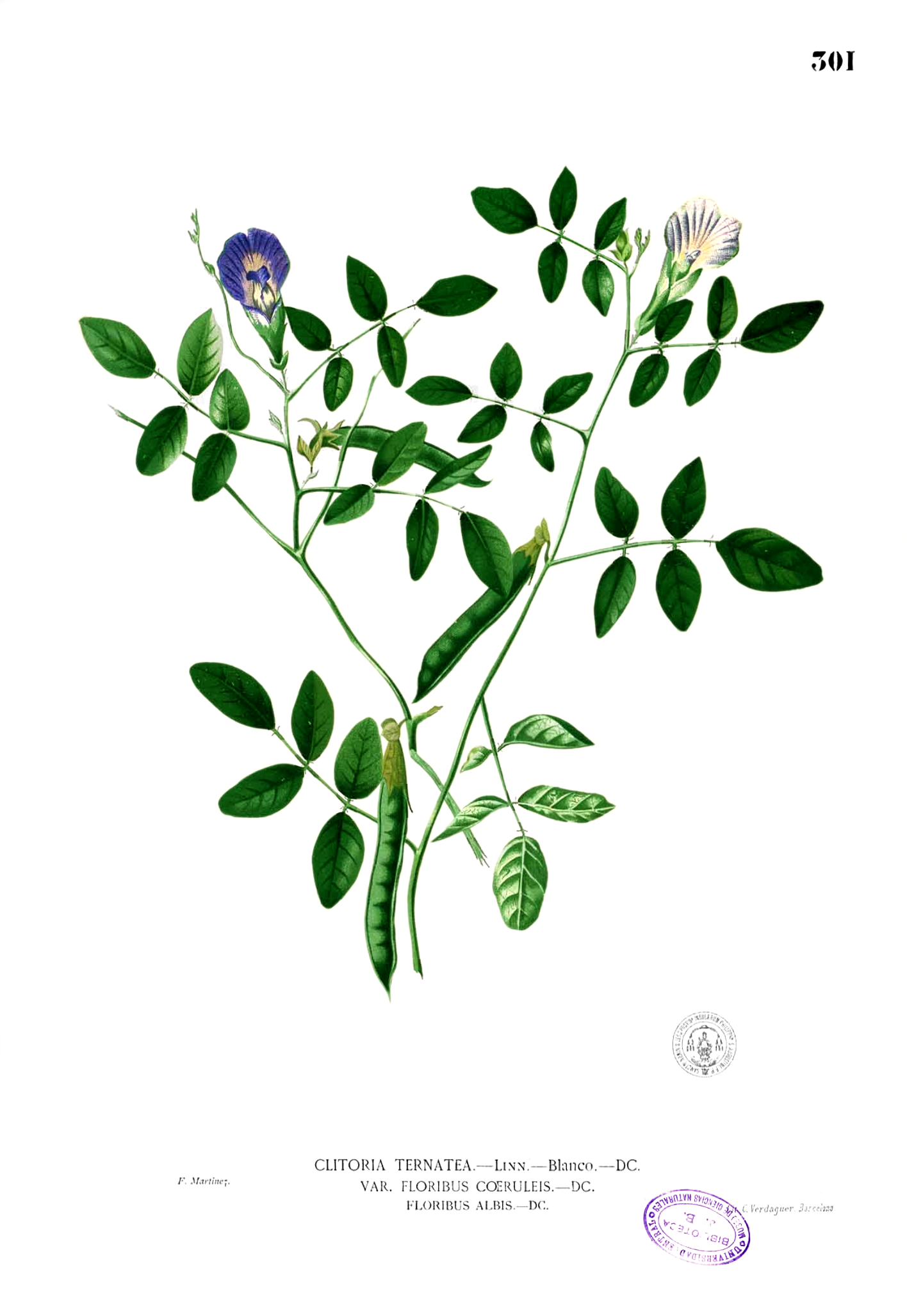
Blue and white varieties of Clitoria ternatea

As of June 2021, Plants of the World Online accepted the following species:

- Clitoria amazonum Mart. ex Benth.
- Clitoria andrei Fantz
- Clitoria annua J.Graham
- Clitoria arborea Benth.
- Clitoria arborescens R.Br.
- Clitoria australis Benth.
- Clitoria brachycalyx Harms
- Clitoria brachystegia Benth.
- Clitoria canescens Pittier ex Fantz
- Clitoria cavalcantei Fantz
- Clitoria cearensis Huber
- Clitoria chanondii Chuakul
- Clitoria cordiformis Fantz
- Clitoria cordobensis Burkart
- Clitoria coriacea Schery
- Clitoria dendrina Pittier
- Clitoria densiflora (Benth.) Benth.
- Clitoria epetiolata Burkart
- Clitoria fairchildiana R.A.Howard
- Clitoria falcata Lam.
- Clitoria flagellaris (Benth.) Benth.
- Clitoria flexuosa Fantz
- Clitoria fragrans Small
- Clitoria froesii Fantz
- Clitoria glaberrima Pittier
- Clitoria guianensis (Aubl.) Benth.
- Clitoria hanceana Hemsl.
- Clitoria hermannii Fantz
- Clitoria heterophylla Lam.
- Clitoria humilis Rose
- Clitoria irwinii Fantz
- Clitoria javanica Miq.
- Clitoria javitensis (Kunth) Benth.
- Clitoria juninensis Fantz
- Clitoria kaessneri Harms
- Clitoria kaieteurensis Fantz
- Clitoria lasciva Bojer ex Benth.
- Clitoria laurifolia Poir.
- Clitoria leptostachya Benth.
- Clitoria linearis Gagnep.
- Clitoria macrophylla Wall. ex Benth.
- Clitoria magentea Fantz
- Clitoria mariana L.
- Clitoria mexicana Link
- Clitoria monticola Brandegee
- Clitoria moyobambensis Fantz
- Clitoria mucronulata Benth.
- Clitoria nana Benth.
- Clitoria nervosa Herzog
- Clitoria obidensis Huber
- Clitoria pendens Fantz
- Clitoria pilosula Wall. ex Benth.
- Clitoria plumosa Fantz
- Clitoria polystachya Benth.
- Clitoria pozuzoensis J.F.Macbr.
- Clitoria sagotii Fantz
- Clitoria selloi Benth.
- Clitoria simplicifolia (Kunth) Benth.
- Clitoria snethlageae Ducke
- Clitoria speciosa Cav.
- Clitoria steyermarkii Fantz
- Clitoria stipularis Benth.
- Clitoria ternatea L.
- Clitoria triflora S.Watson
- Clitoria tunuhiensis Fantz
- Clitoria woytkowskii Fantz

== Distribution ==
These plants are native to tropical, subtropical and temperate areas of the world, ranging through the temperate and tropical Americas, sub-Saharan Africa, Arabian Peninsula, Indian Subcontinent, Indochina, southern China, and Western Australia and the Northern Territory.

== Uses ==
The most widely known species of the genus is Clitoria ternatea, also known as butterfly pea. It is used as an herbal medicine, and it is used as food, as well. Its roots are used in ayurveda Hindu medicine.

== Gallery ==
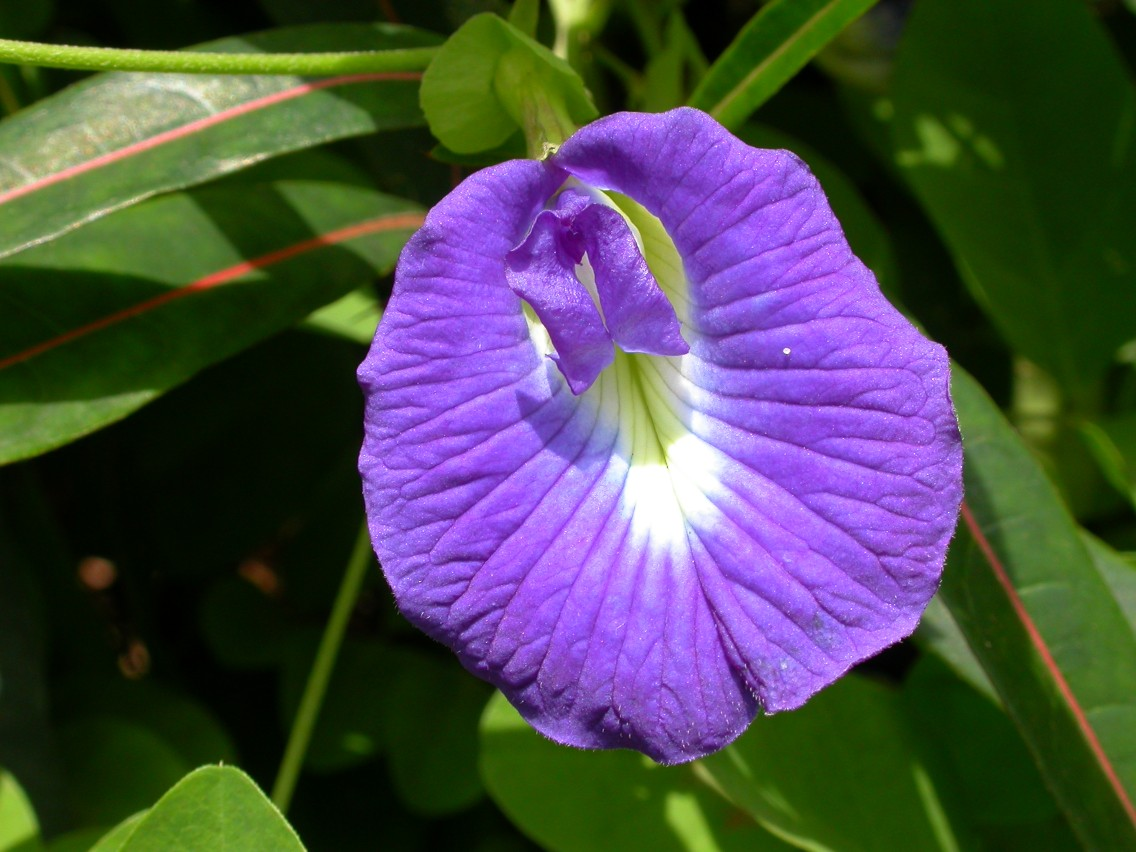
The shape of the Clitoria flowers has inspired the name of the genus

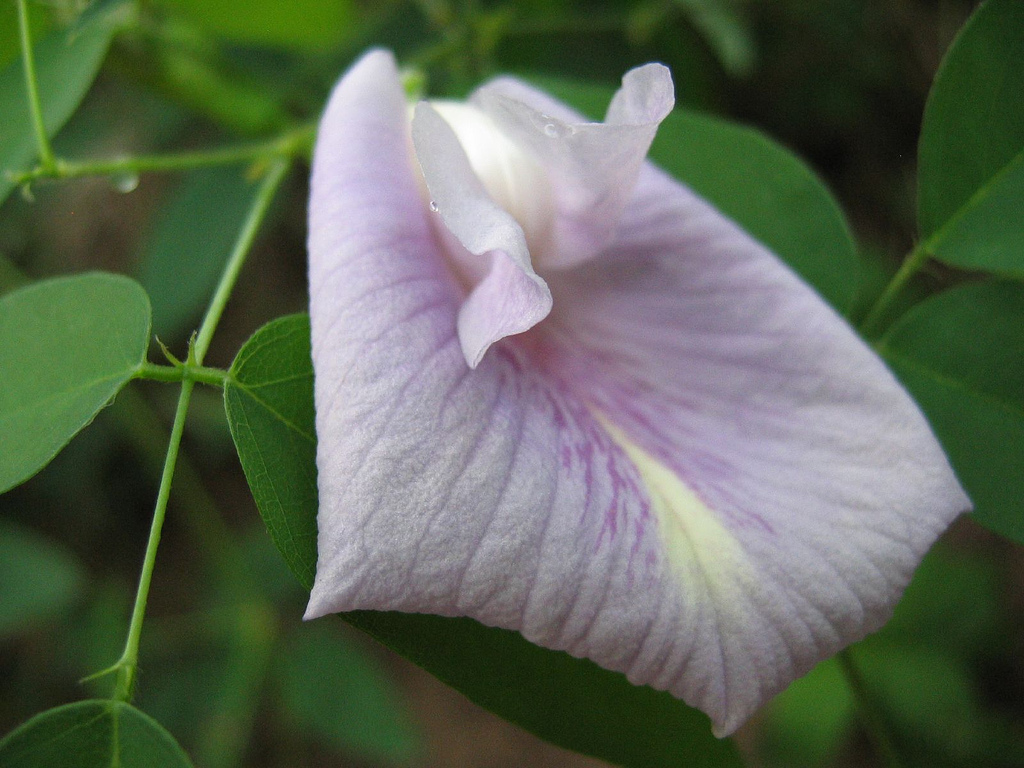
Clitoria mariana flower

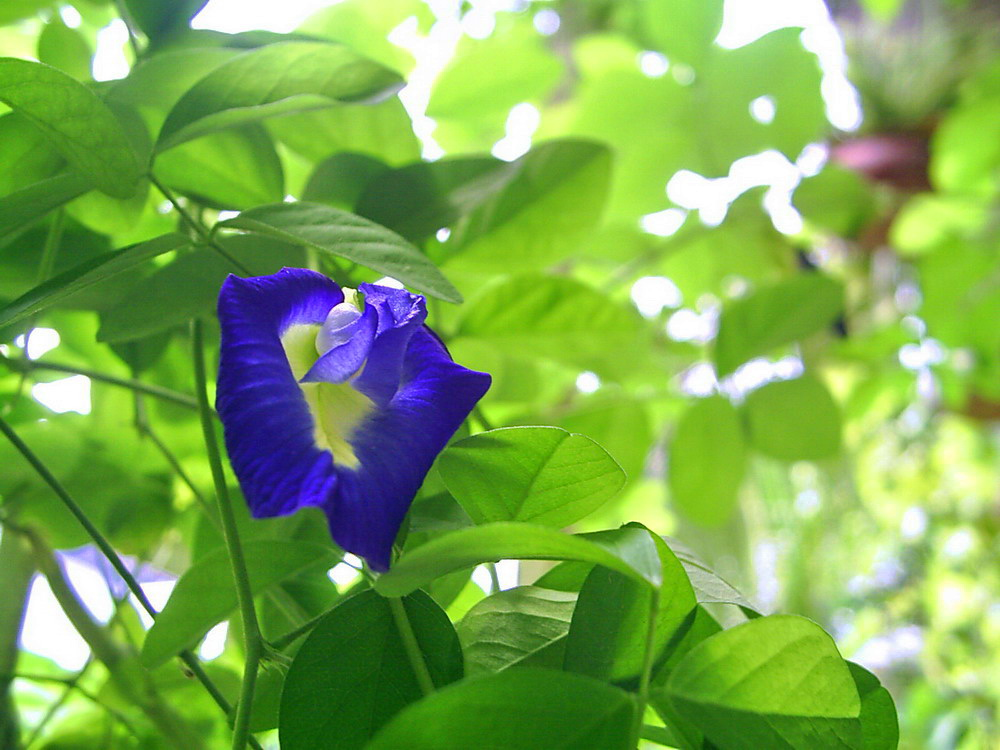
Clitoria ternatea, known as Neel Aporajita in Bangladesh

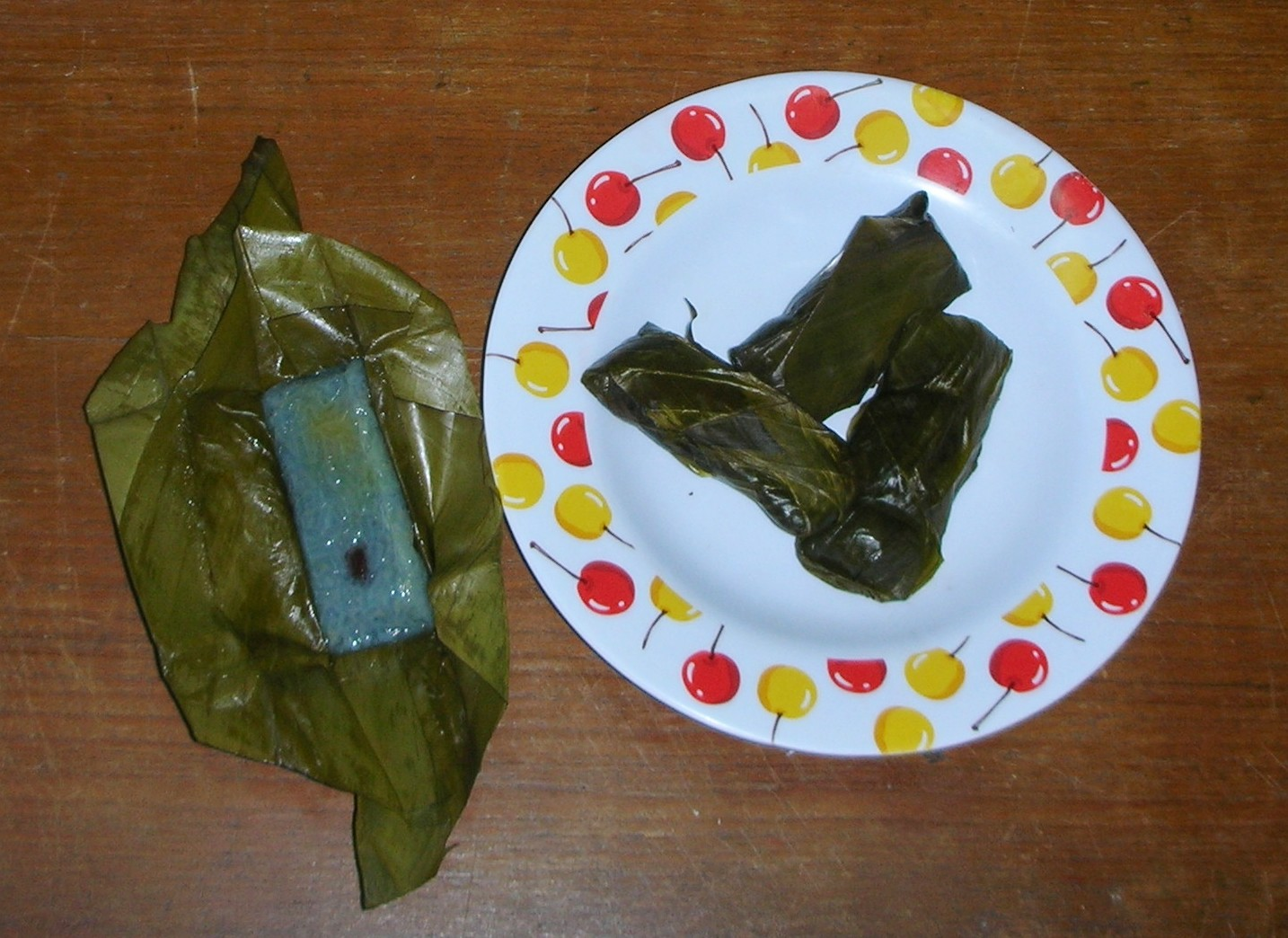
Thai Khao tom sweet colored blue with Clitoria ternatea flowers

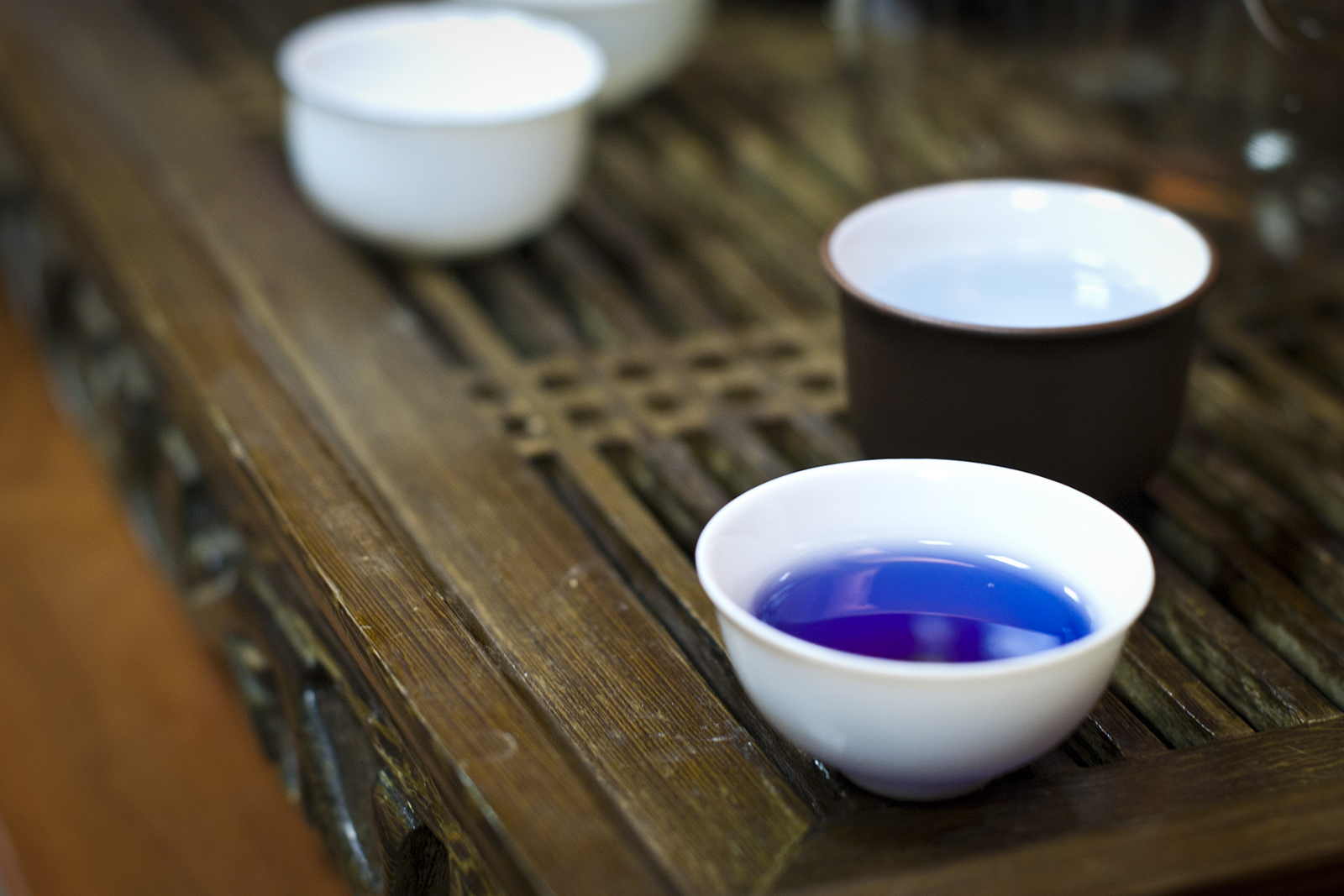
Clitoria tea

== See also ==
- Centrosema
- List of taxa named after human genitals
