= Barbara Regina Dietzsch =

German painter (1706 –1783)

- Born: 22 September 1706; Free Imperial City of Nuremberg, Electorate of Bavaria, Holy Roman Empire
- Died: 1 May 1783 (aged 76); Free Imperial City of Nuremberg, Electorate of Bavaria, Holy Roman Empire
- Known for: Painting; Engraving
- Patrons: Court of the Free Imperial City of Nuremberg, Christoph Jacob Trew

Barbara Regina Dietzsch (22 September 1706 – 1 May 1783) was a Bavarian painter and engraver known for her still lifes.

== Biography ==
Barbara Regina Dietzsch was born in the Free Imperial City of Nuremberg. Members of Dietzsch's family, including her father, Johann Israel, brother Johann Christoph, and sister Margareta, were employed by the Nuremberg courts. Dietzsch taught Margareta how to paint.

Dietzsch was married to Nikolaus Christopher Matthes, who was also a painter. The couple resided in Hamburg. Dietzsch eventually returned to Nuremberg where she died in May 1783.

== Career ==
Dietzsch specialized in watercolor and gouache paintings of animals and plants. Dietzsch primarily painted flowers, and she also painted birds and shells. Her works are typically identifiable by their brown or otherwise monochromatic backgrounds. These works were made into engravings, most of which Dietzsch created herself.

Her works sold in Germany, England, Holland, and France. They were collected in the Netherlands and England. Additionally, although Dietzsch herself did not illustrate textbooks, her works have been included in German natural history books. Christoph Jacob Trew, a physician and botanist, was a patron of botanical art in Nuremberg, including that of the Dietzsch family. Her work was influential on artist Ernst Friedrich Carl Lang.

The Dietzsch family used art to portray the natural world in a way that reflected the philosophical and scientific advancements of their time. Germaine Greer describes Dietzsch's work as "exact and linear, as one might expect of designs for engraving, but in her more ambitious flower pieces she exhibited a conservatism of approach which was fairly antiquarian."

The similarities in style and subject matter of works by Dietzsch and works by her family members have caused challenges in attribution.

== Notable works ==
- A Dandelion with a Tiger Moth, a Butterfly, a Snail, and a Beetle, 18th century, Fine Arts Museums of San Francisco
- Dandelion, about 1755, J. Paul Getty Museum
- Passiflora caerulea, Tied bouquet with ranunculus and Tied bouquet with tulips, purchased by the Royal Horticultural Society Lindley Library in 2013.
- A tulip, a butterfly of the species Arctia caja (garden tiger moth), and a beetle (possibly a longhorn), second or third quarter 18th century, acquired by the Metropolitan Museum of Art in 2024.

== Gallery ==
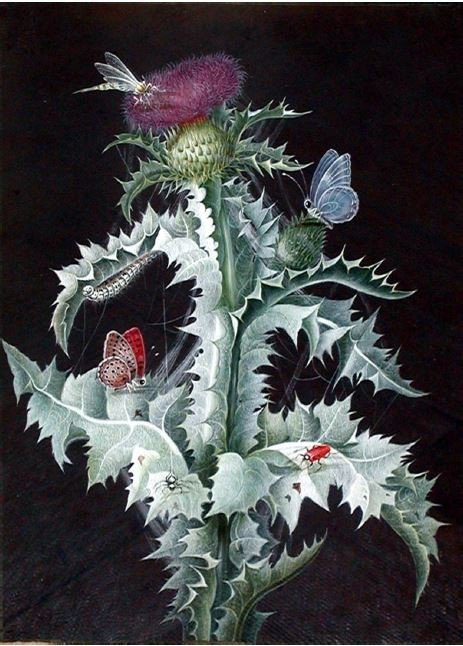
A Study of a Thistle

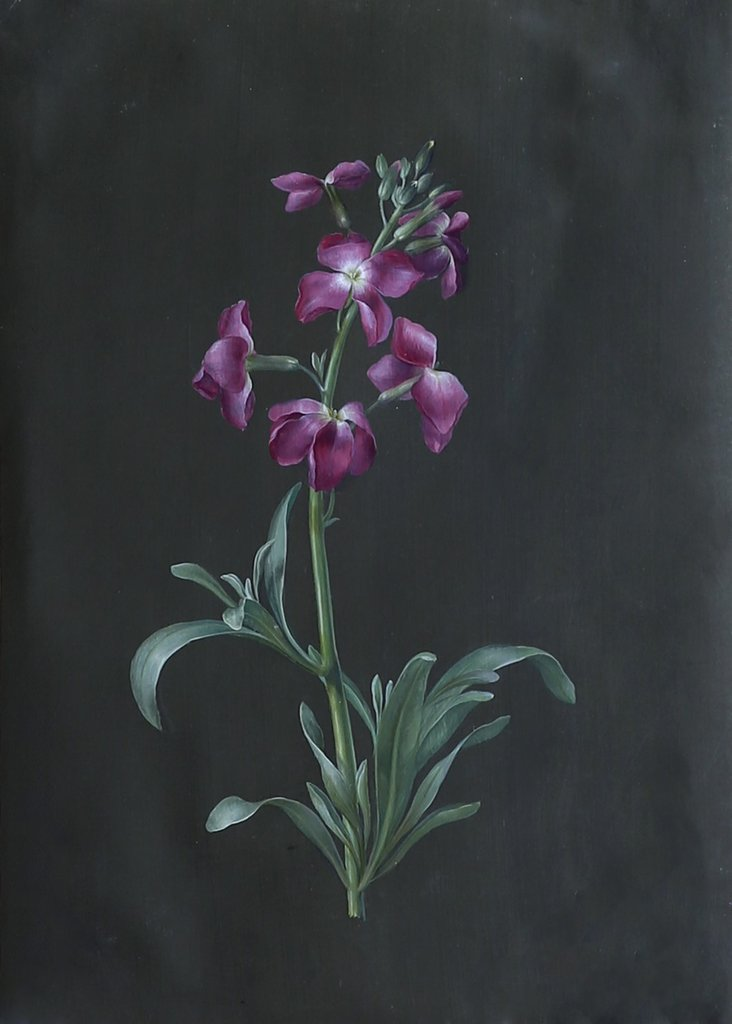
Bouquet (Pink Flowers)

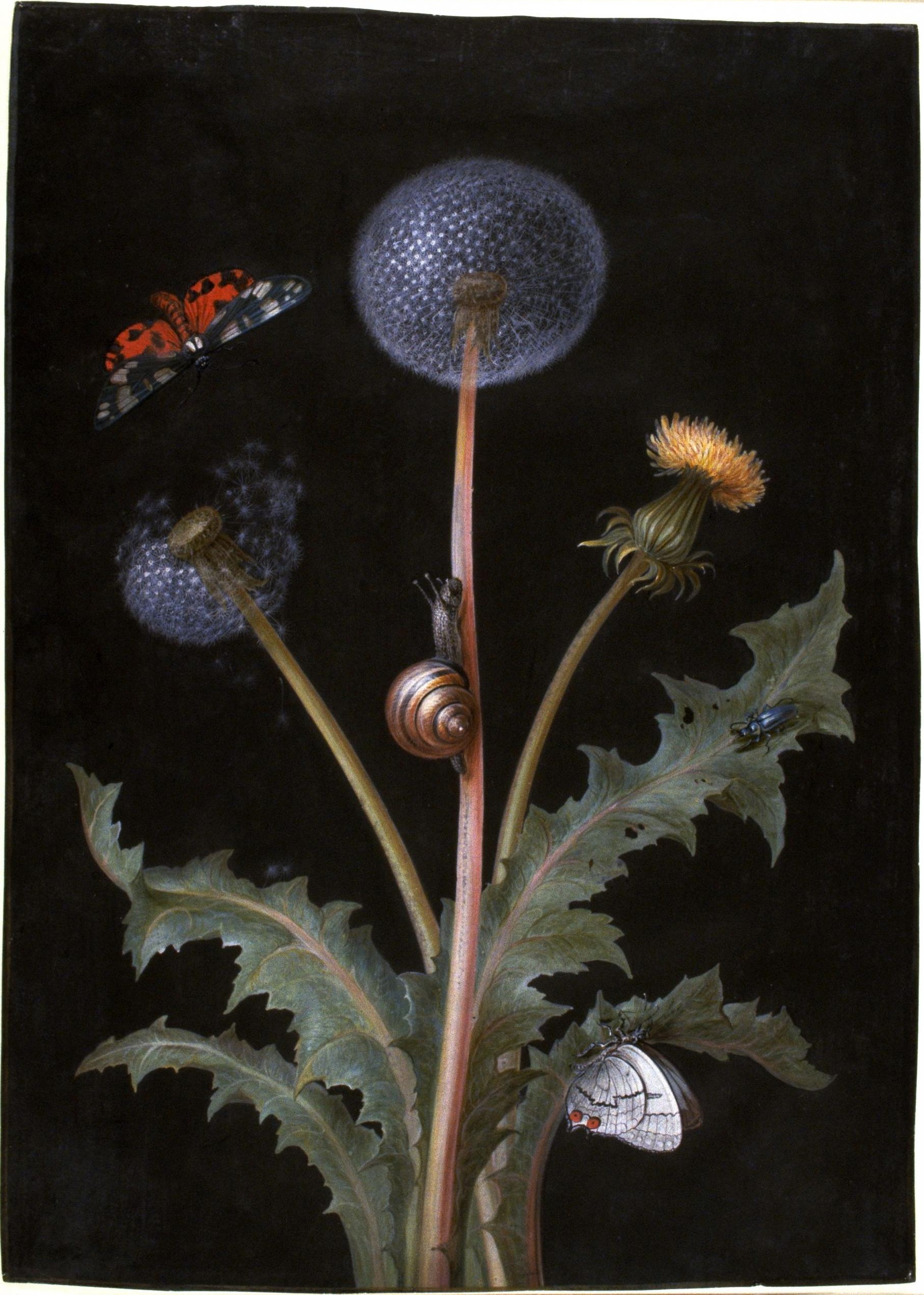
A Dandelion with a Tiger Moth, a Butterfly, a Snail, and a Beetle

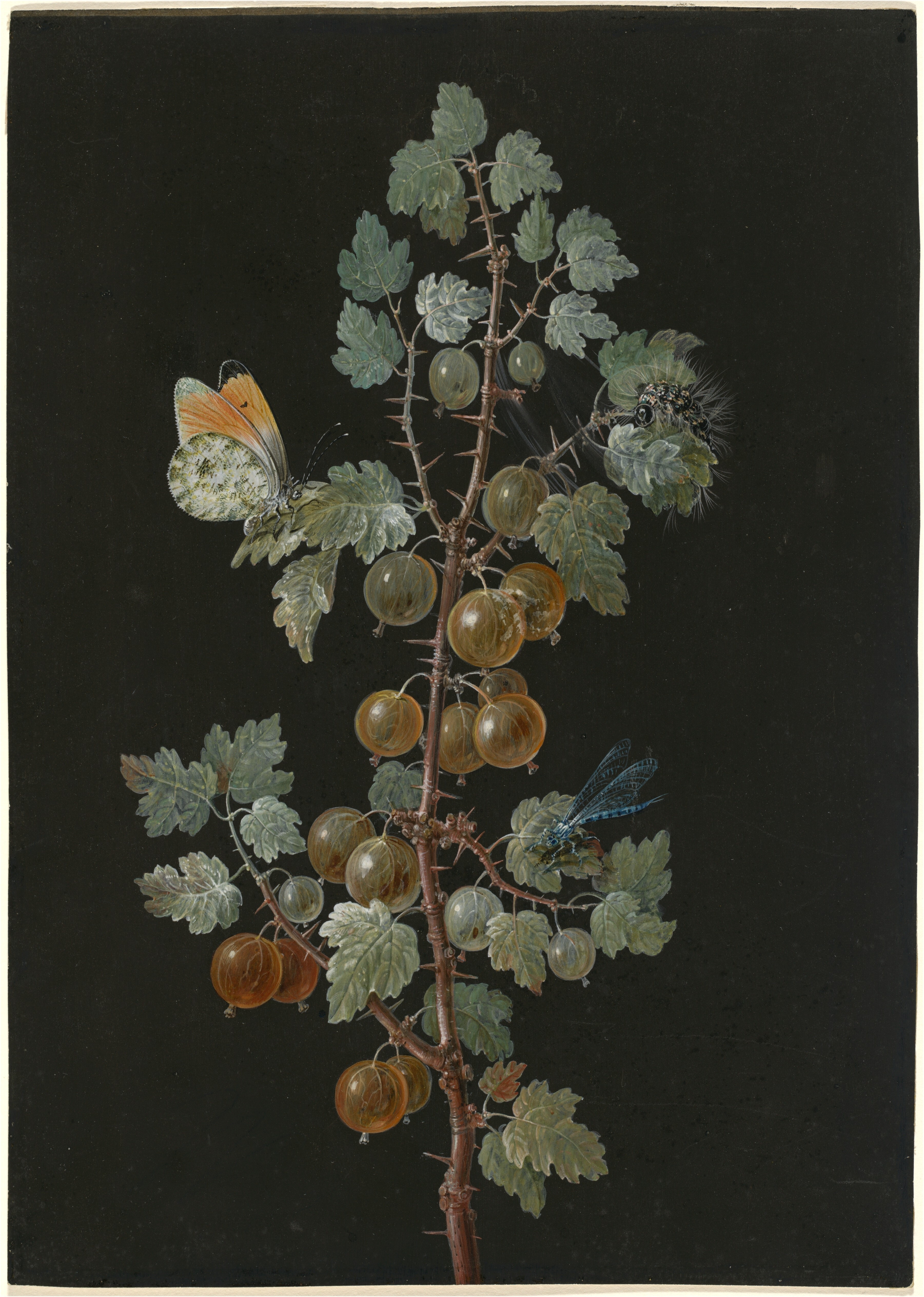
A Branch of Gooseberries with a Dragonfly, an Orange-Tip Butterfly, and a Caterpillar, 1725-1783, National Gallery of Art

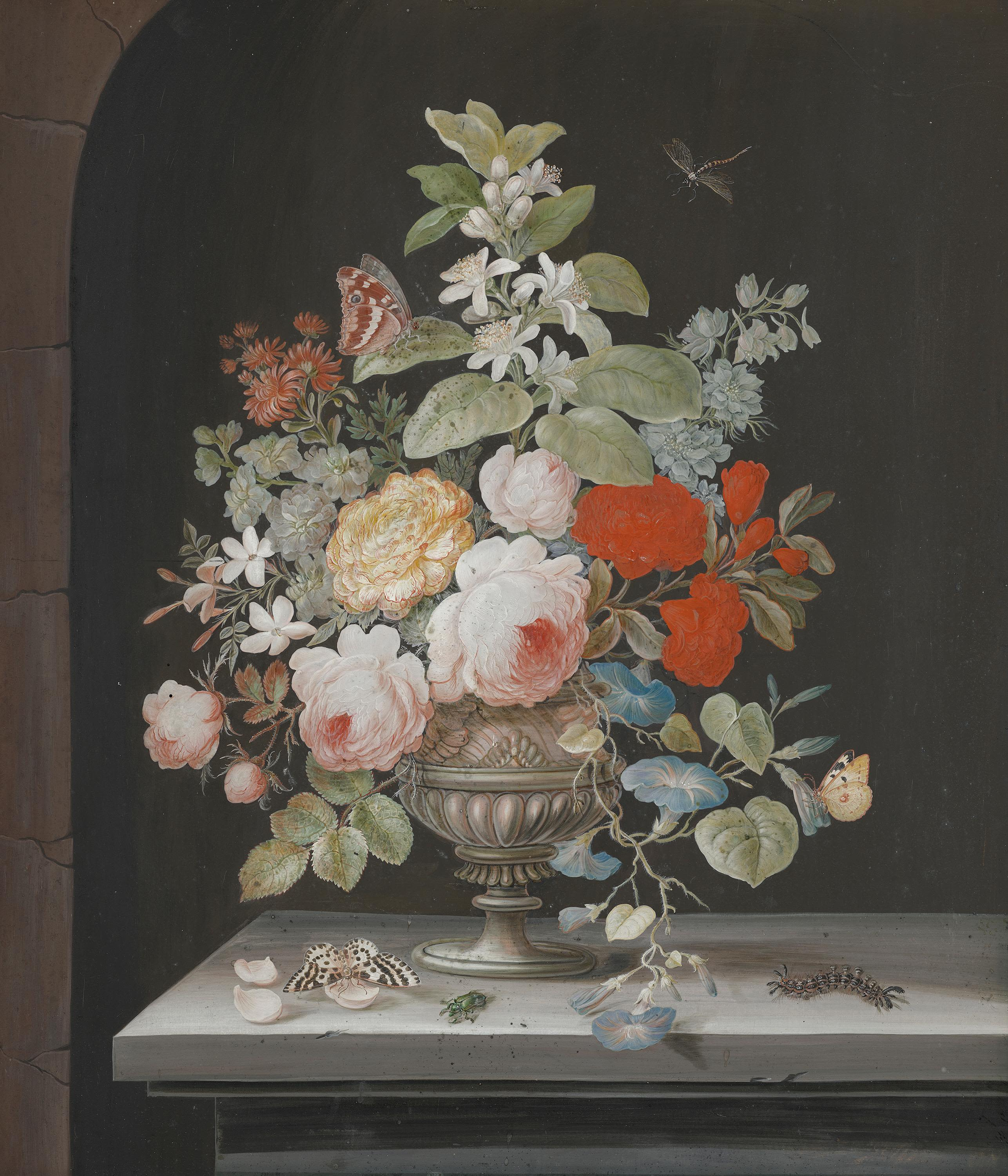
Blumenstück

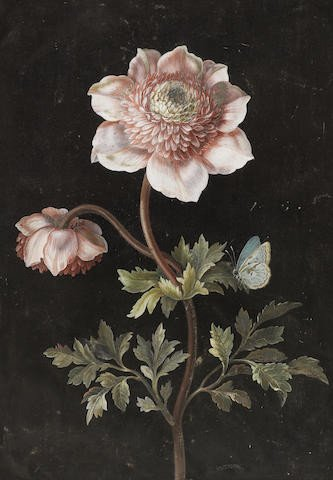
Anemones and a Large Blue Butterfly (Phengaris arion)

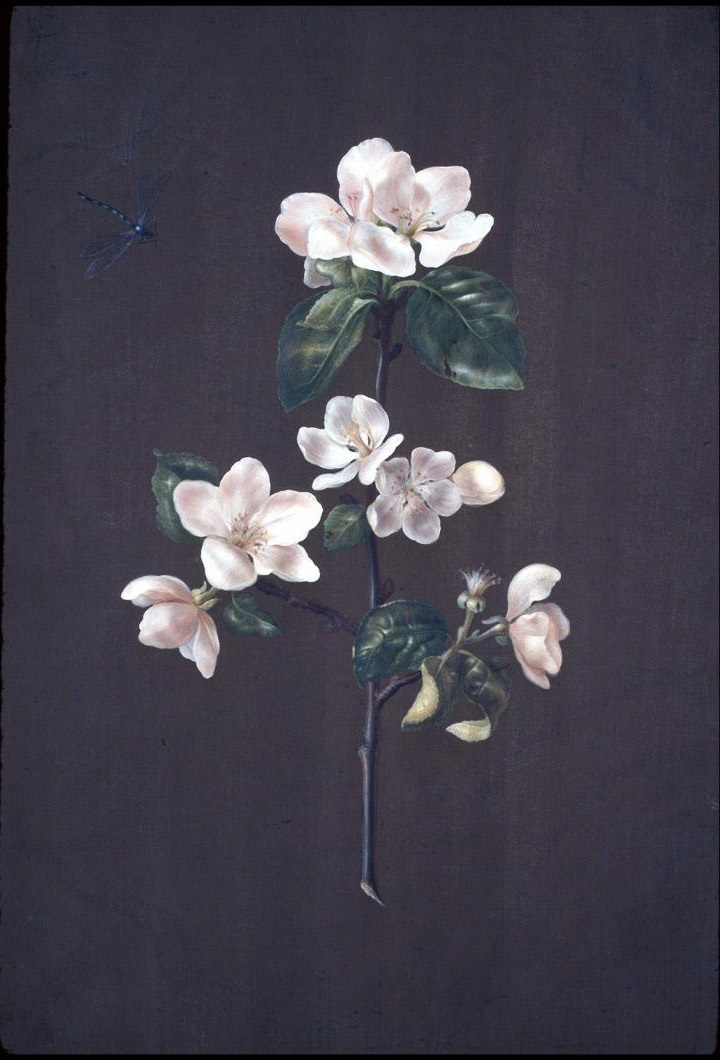
Apple Blossom

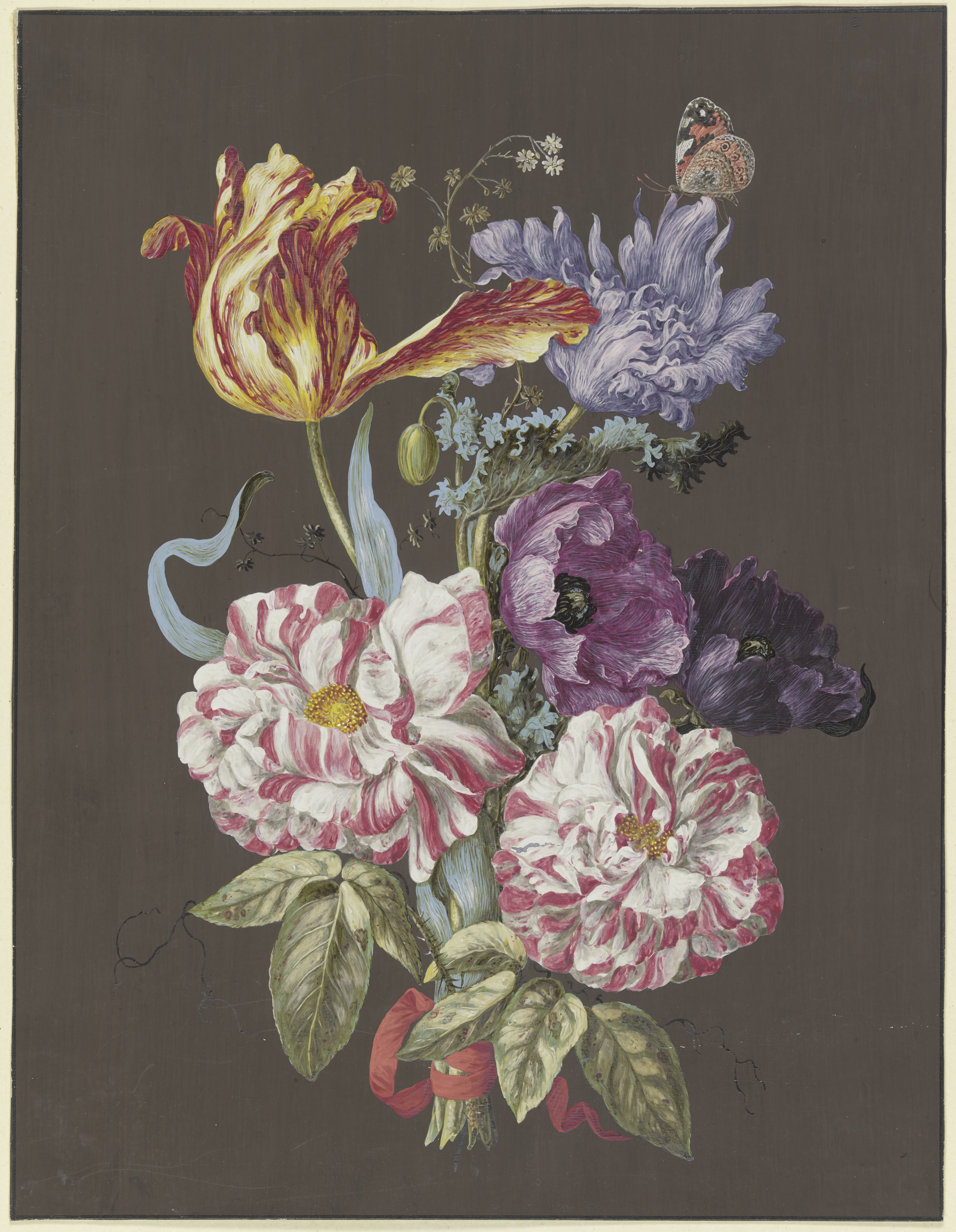
Blumengebinde mit Rosen (Rosa), Tulpen (Tulipa), Mohn (Papaver) und anderen Blumen, mit Admiral

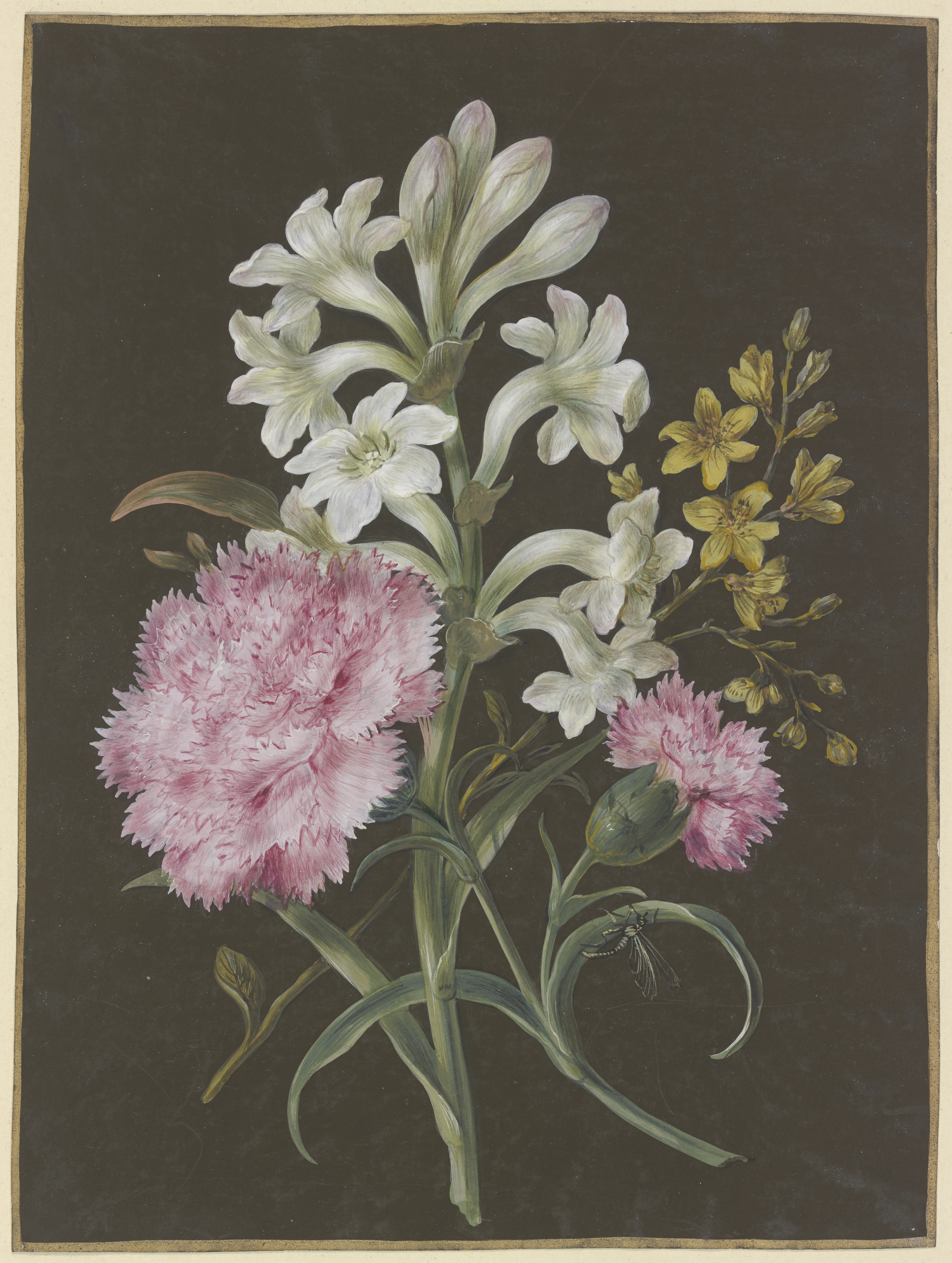
Gesteck aus Tuberose (Polyanthes), rosa Nelke (Dianthus) und gelber Blume mit Fliege

Rosa Rose (Rosa) mit einem braunen Käfer

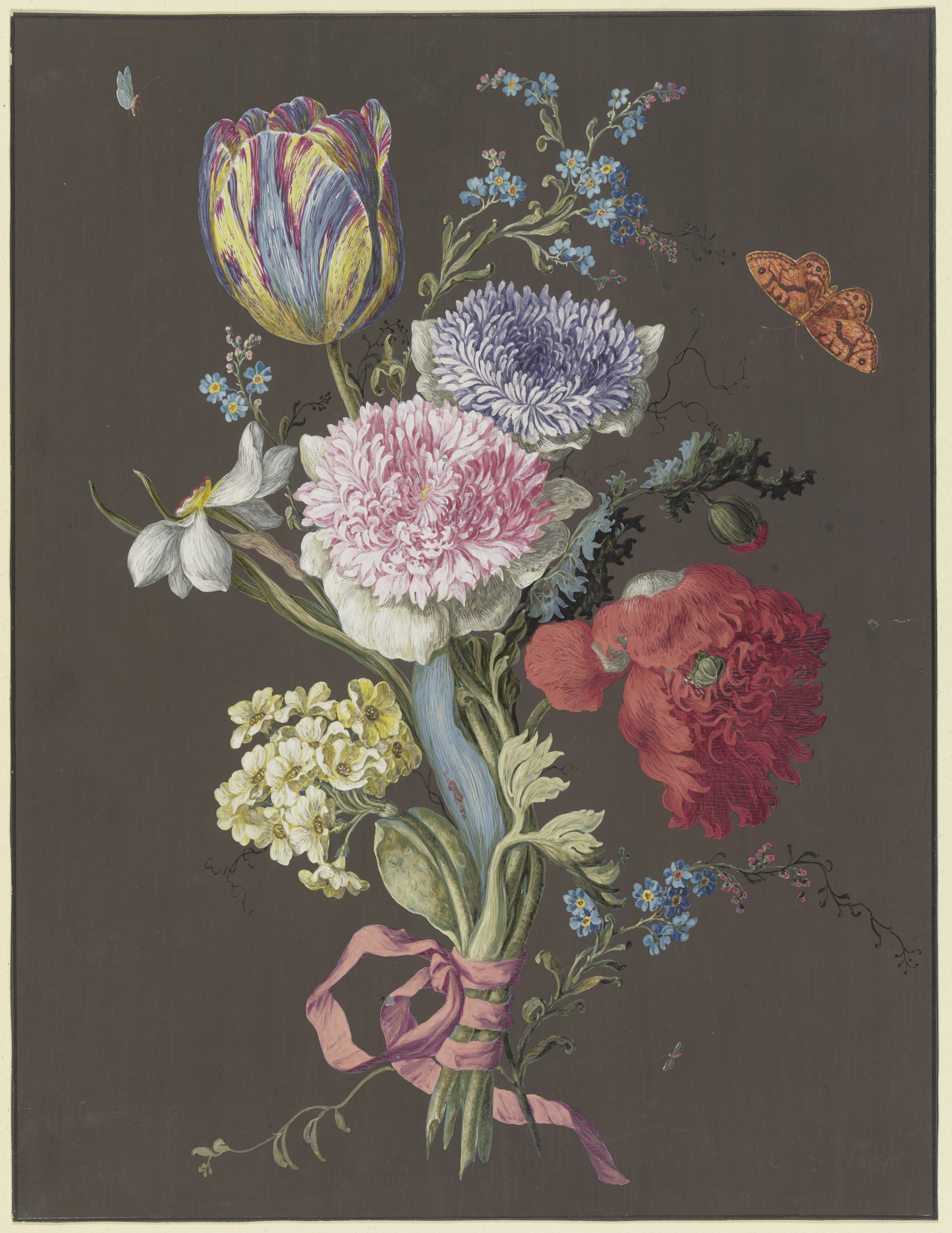
Blumengebinde aus Anemonen (Anemona), Tulpe (Tulipa), Mohn(Papaver), Narzisse (Narcissus) und Aurikel (Primula auricula) mit braunem Schmetterling

Orangerote Aurikel (Primula auricula) mit Stachelbeer-Harlekin und sich einspinnender Raupe

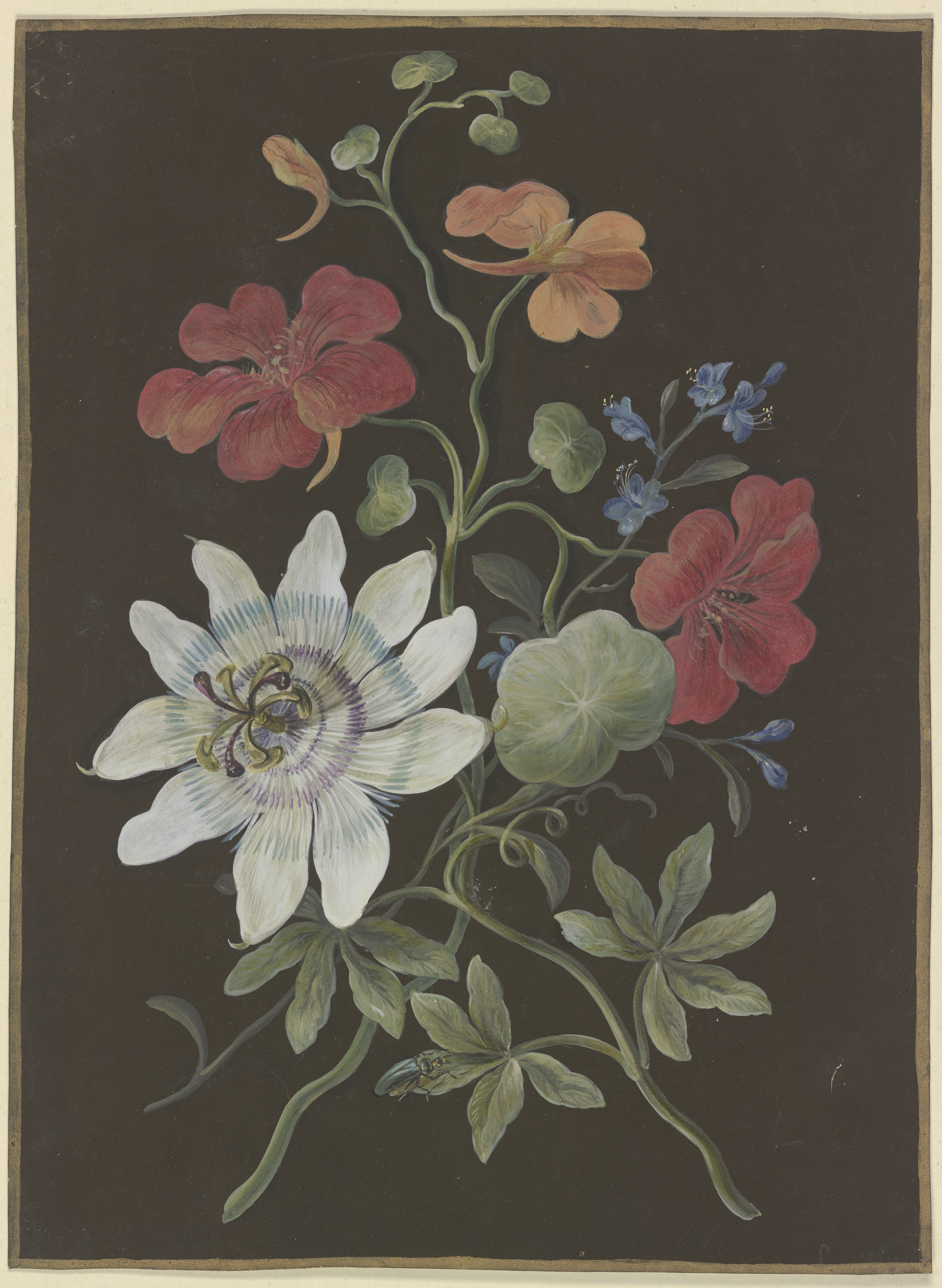
Gesteck aus Passionsblume (Passiflora), roter Kapuzinerkresse (Tropaeplum) und Vergißmeinnicht (Myosotis), mit blauem Käfer

Blumenkorb mit Tulpen, Levkojen, Rittersporn und anderen Blumen auf einem Tisch

Blumengebinde mit roter Ranunkel (Ranunculus), weißer Tazette (Narcissus tazetta) und blauer Blume (?) mit Postillon
