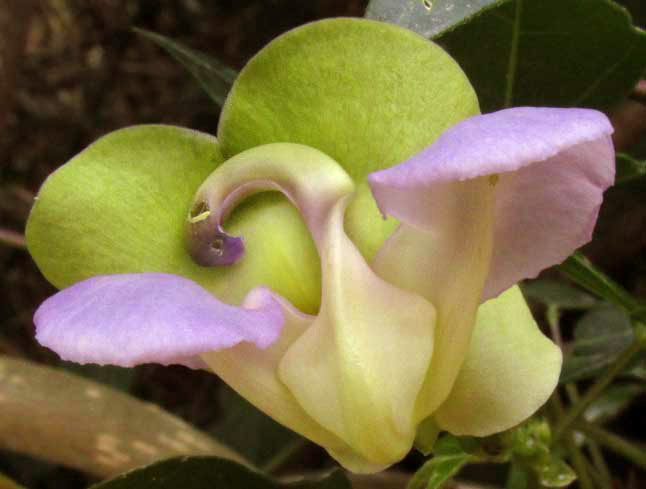
- Sigmoidotropis elegans flower, typical pale color

Scientific classification
- Kingdom: Plantae
- Clade: Tracheophytes
- Clade: Angiosperms
- Clade: Eudicots
- Clade: Rosids
- Order: Fabales
- Family: Fabaceae
- Subfamily: Faboideae
- Genus: Sigmoidotropis
- Species: S. elegans

Binomial name
- Sigmoidotropis elegans (Piper) A.Delgado (2011)

Synonyms
- Phaseolus elegans Piper (1926); Vigna elegans (Piper) Maréchal, Mascherpa & Stainier (1978)

= Sigmoidotropis elegans =

Species of flowering plant

Sigmoidotropis elegans is a species of flowering plant in the family Fabaceae.

== Description ==
Sigmoidotropis elegans is a somewhat woody perennial, spineless, hairy vine with woody taproots. Its leaves consist of slender petioles shorter than their three membranous leaflets. Leaflets are narrowly ovate and gradually diminish in width toward a sharp tip. Leaflets are up to 6 cm (2.4 in) long, their margins are not toothed or incised, and their bases are rounded. At petiole bases, stipules are narrowly triangular, sharply tipped, 7-nerved and 4 mm (0.16 in) long.

As with other species of the genus Sigmoidotropis, a small number of flowers are arranged in inflorescences in which each successive flower arises in the axil of the pedicel base of an earlier flower in the same cluster, sometimes there being only a single flower; such inflorescences are called "pseudoracemes".

Flowers are large, showy, and butterfly-like in shape, or papilionaceus. Corollas range from pale violet to deep blue, and are 2 cm (0.79 in) long and broad - about 4/5 in (20 mm). The flower's glory, however, is its distinctive "keel", which consists of the corolla's bottom two petals fused along their common margins. The keel forms a tubular structure so strongly curved that it nearly makes a complete loop; it's said to be "sigmoid", which in this case means that it's curved like the letter C. The legume-type fruit, typical of the Bean Family, is straight and narrow - to 16 cm (6.3 in) long but only 5 mm (0.20 in) wide, and tipped with a "beak". Seeds are ellipsoid, compressed, somewhat ochre colored speckled with black, and measure 5 mm x 3 mm x 1 mm.

Among neotropical vines, the C-shaped, sigmoid keels of Sigmoidotropis species distinguish them from similar species of the genus Ancistrotropis, which produce S-shaped ones. In terms of vegetative features, Sigmoidotropis may exhibit cauliflory which, among neotropical vines, is a trait shared only with some species of Clitoria and Dioclea, and all species of Neorudolphia.

== Distribution ==
Sigmoidotropis elegans occurs in southeastern Mexico's Yucatan Peninsula, Honduras and Jamaica.

== Pollination dynamics ==
The remarkable curled keels of flowers of Sigmoidotropis elegans become more understandable when it's understood that the keel is part of the "levers, platforms, and pumps" which have evolved to facilitate pollination. Similar systems are seen in all the over 200 species belonging to the New World "subtribe" or clade of the Phaseolinae, to which the genus Sigmoidotropia belongs. The flower's design facilitates the deposition of pollen exactly where it's needed on the pollinator's body, with a special "pollen brush", while serving nectar in such conservative portions that more than one pollinator visit is required; this encourages the most pollination for the least expenditure of pollen and nectar. Big, colorful flowers attract pollinators, then manipulate their movements to encourage efficient pollination.

== Taxonomy ==
The type specimen of Sigmoidotropis elegans was collected by William R. Maxon in the vicinity of Mona Mountain near Kingston, Jamaica; it's stored in the United States National Herbarium, no. 427961. When Piper described the species, as Phaseolus elegans, he remarked that the taxon was "Closely allied to P. speciosus H. B. K., and perhaps to be considered merely a glabrous subspecies." P. speciosus now is Sigmoidotropis speciosa.

Studies based on maximum likelihood estimation and Bayesian phylogenetic analyses using the chloroplast matK-trnK region and the internal transcribed spacer region of DNA suggest that the genus Sigmoidotropis is sister to Condylostylis; these two genera arose about a million years ago. Within Sigmoidotropis, S. elegans is sister to both S. speciosa and S. ampla.

The study also includes the genus Sigmoidotropis as one of 27 genera constituting the subtribe, or clade, of Phaseolinae.

== Etymology ==
The first part of the genus name Sigmoidotropis derives from the ancient Greek sigmoid, meaning "sigma-shaped", Sigma being the eighteenth letter of the Greek alphabet, Σ. This alludes to flower's curved keel. Note that "sigmoid" can mean either "curved like the letter C," which is the case with Sigmoidotropis, or an S. The -tropis suffix apparently is from the Greek -tropos, used as a combining form to mean "turned, curved" in a certain way.

The species name elegans is from the New Latin meaning "choice, fine, tasteful", thus "elegant".

== Gallery ==
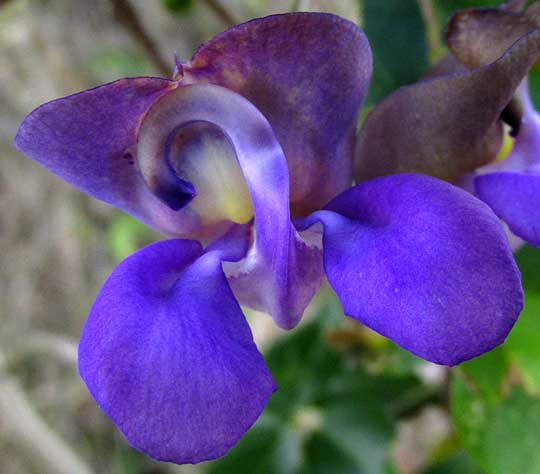
Nemastylis tenuis flower, blue expression

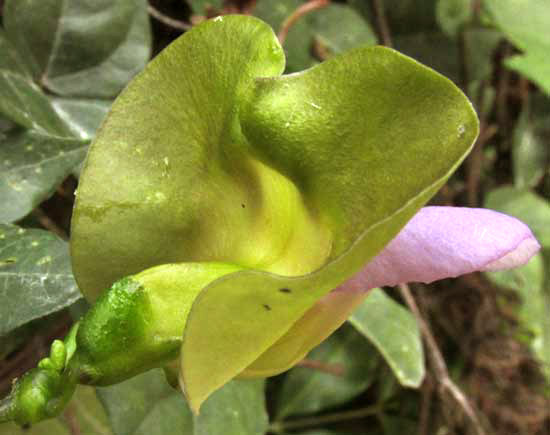
Nemastylis tenuis flower from behind

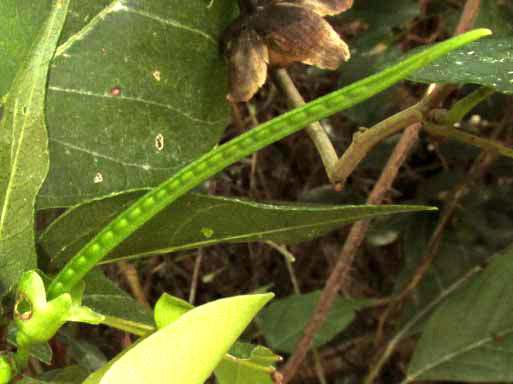
Nemastylis tenuis immature legume

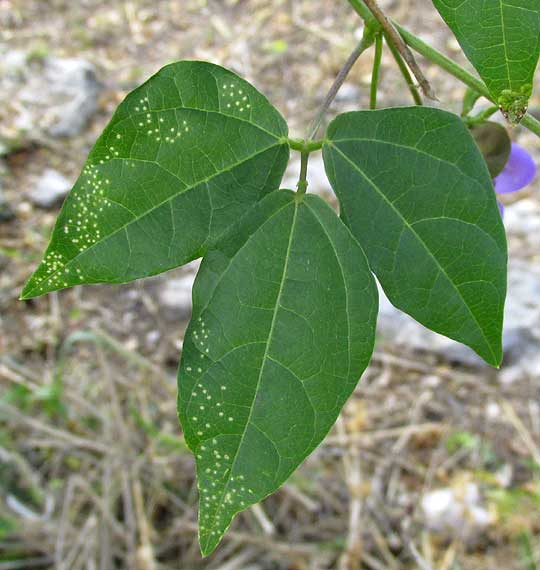
Nemastylis tenuis trifoliate leaf

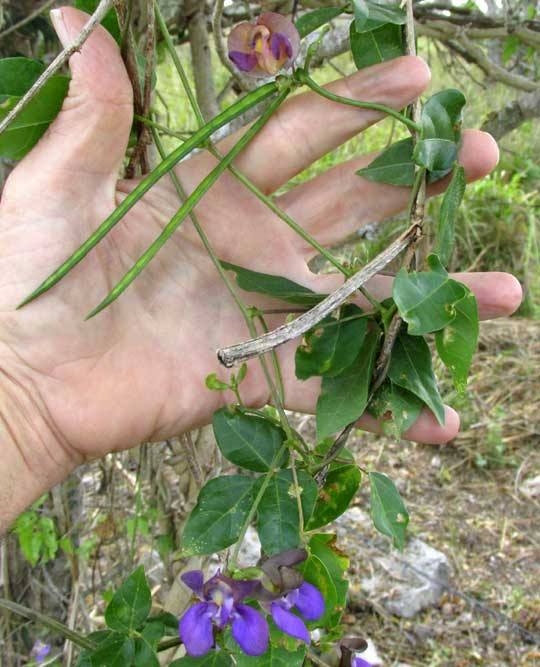
Nemastylis tenuis flowering branch
