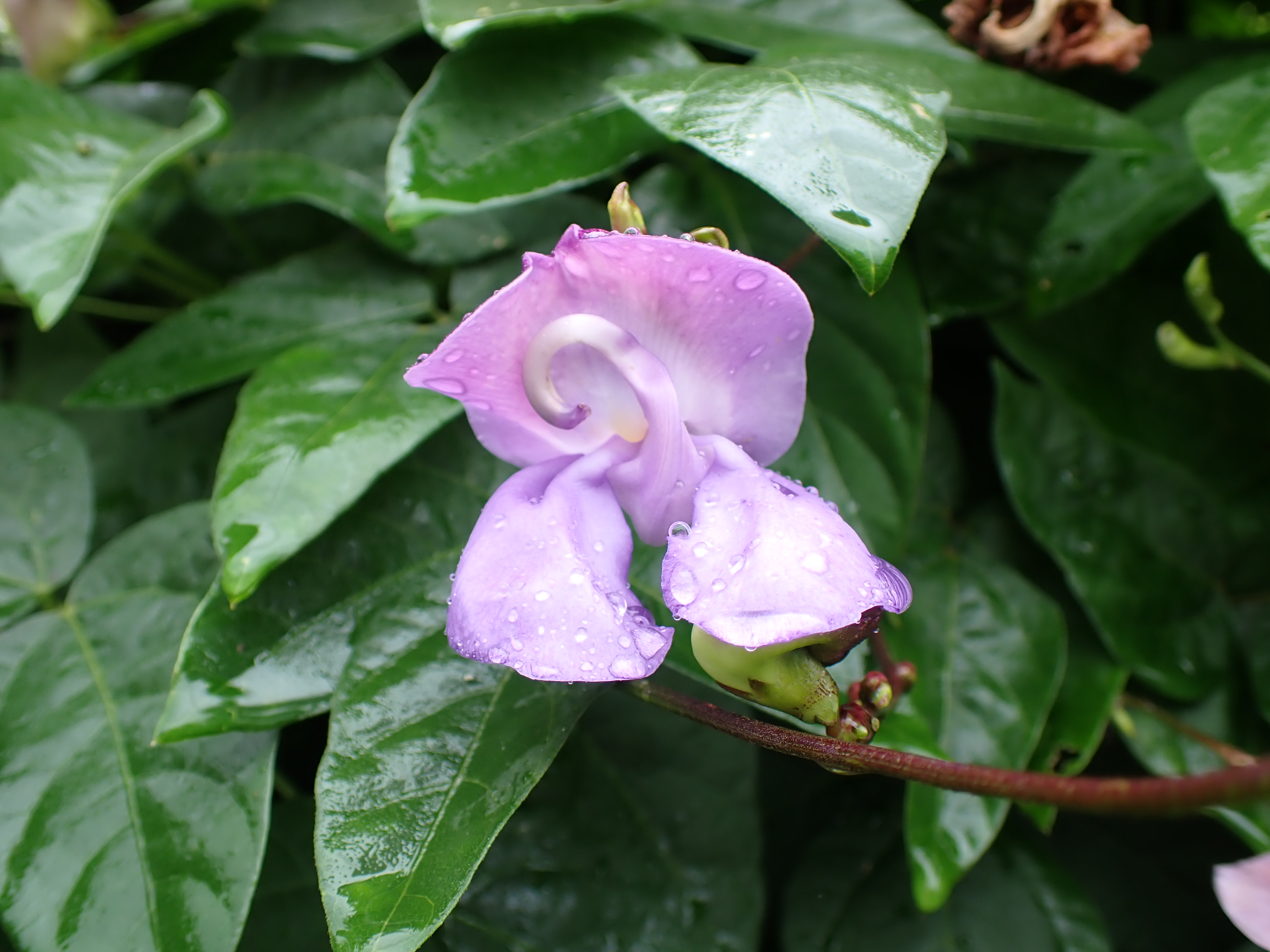

Scientific classification
- Kingdom: Plantae
- Clade: Tracheophytes
- Clade: Angiosperms
- Clade: Eudicots
- Clade: Rosids
- Order: Fabales
- Family: Fabaceae
- Subfamily: Faboideae
- Genus: Sigmoidotropis
- Species: S. speciosa

Binomial name
- Sigmoidotropis speciosa (Kunth) A.Delgado

Synonyms
- Phaseolus speciosus Kunth; Vigna speciosa (Kunth) Verdc.

= Sigmoidotropis speciosa =

Genus of legumes

Sigmoidotropis speciosa is a leguminous flowering plant in the family Fabaceae that originates in tropical South America and Central America. The species has first been described as Phaseolus speciosus in 1824.

== Description ==
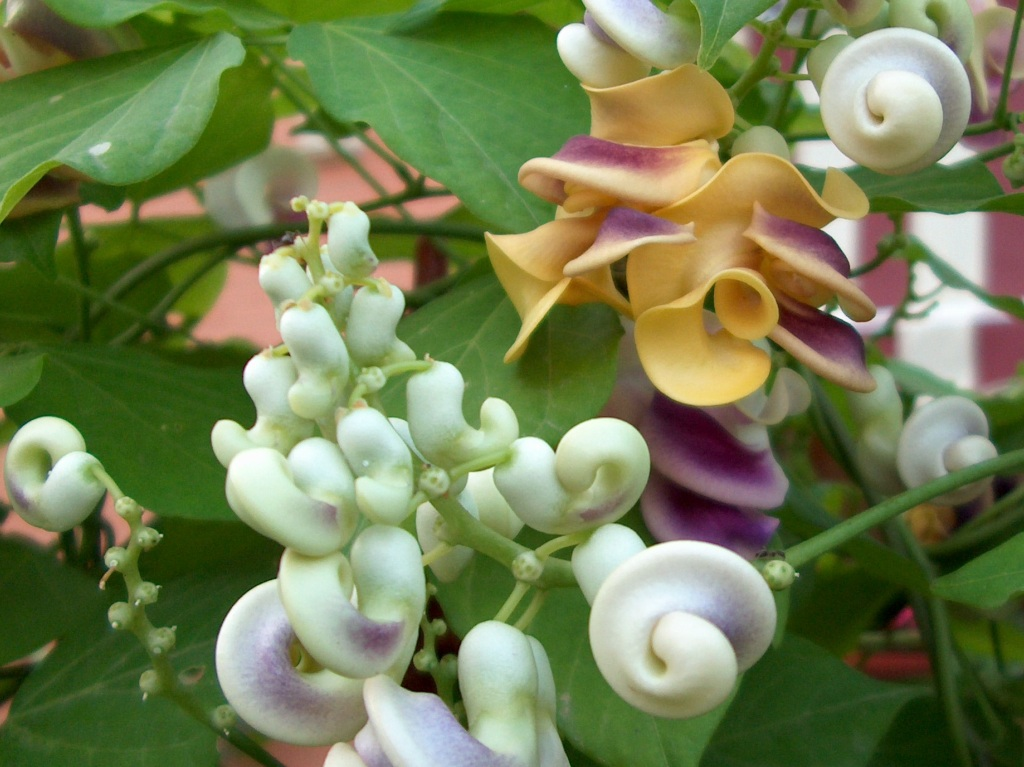
Cochliasanthus caracalla flowers. This species is often confused with Sigmoidotropis speciosa

The keel of the flowers of S. speciosa is asymmetrical and strongly curved. Due to this character, the species is often called snail-vine. Several other species of Phaseoleae also have an asymmetrical and curved keel and some of them even share the common name snail-vine. This has led to excessive confusion in the horticultural trade where S. speciosa is often confused with Cochliasanthus caracalla. In S. speciosa the flowers are purple, non-fragrant and the inflorescence has a few flowers only. The keel is curved in a single circle and the banner is largely symmetrical. In C. caracalla the flowers are multicolored, fragrant and the inflorescence is long with many flowers. The keel is curved in multiple circles and the banner is strongly asymmetrical. Though some claim that the leaves of one species are darker and differently sized compared to the leaves of the other, it is difficult to distinguish between these two plants through foliage alone.

There have been multiple instances where both plants have been grown side by side for years and the discovery that they were not the same species was made only after the less mature plant finally bloomed. Like many Phaseoleae with asymmetric flowers S. speciosa is probably pollinated by large bee species in the wild. Some horticulturists state that flower visiting ants can also pollinate flowers of cultivated S. speciosa.

In Sigmoidotropis speciosa the flowers are a solid, pale purple. The flowers, which grow alone or in small groups rather than in clusters, consist of five petals: one large wavy half-circle on the top (banner), two tear-drop shaped petals that point inwards (wings), and a two petals (keel petals) forming the thin, erect, curled keel. Depending on the angle, the two wings can appear to be a single petal that strongly resembles the banner. When this happens, the three main petals come together to form an open-clam shape. The center of the flower and the end of keel may have a small area of yellow and/or white but the color is usually faint and only noticeable upon close examination.

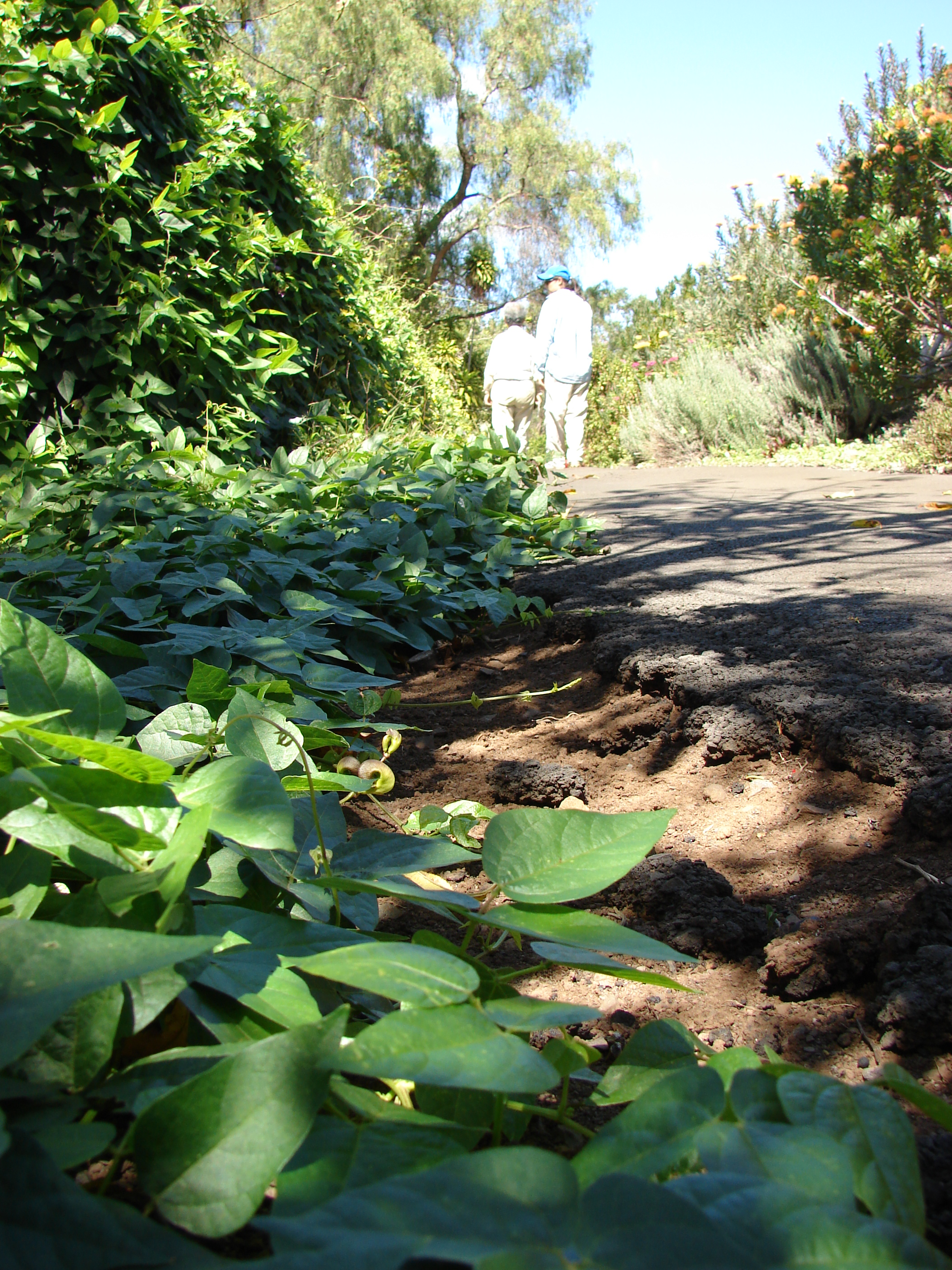
This invasive vine has taken over a fence and is now spreading across the ground.

Immature flower buds often form fat half-crescents but, unlike the corkscrew vine, these buds are green, yellow, or brown. This plant might be more susceptible to aphids but is definitely invasive and has been compared by multiple growers to kudzu. Rapid growth combined with the ability of vines touching the ground to take root make this an invasive plant. This plant has been known to regrow even after all foliage visible above ground has died from frost.
