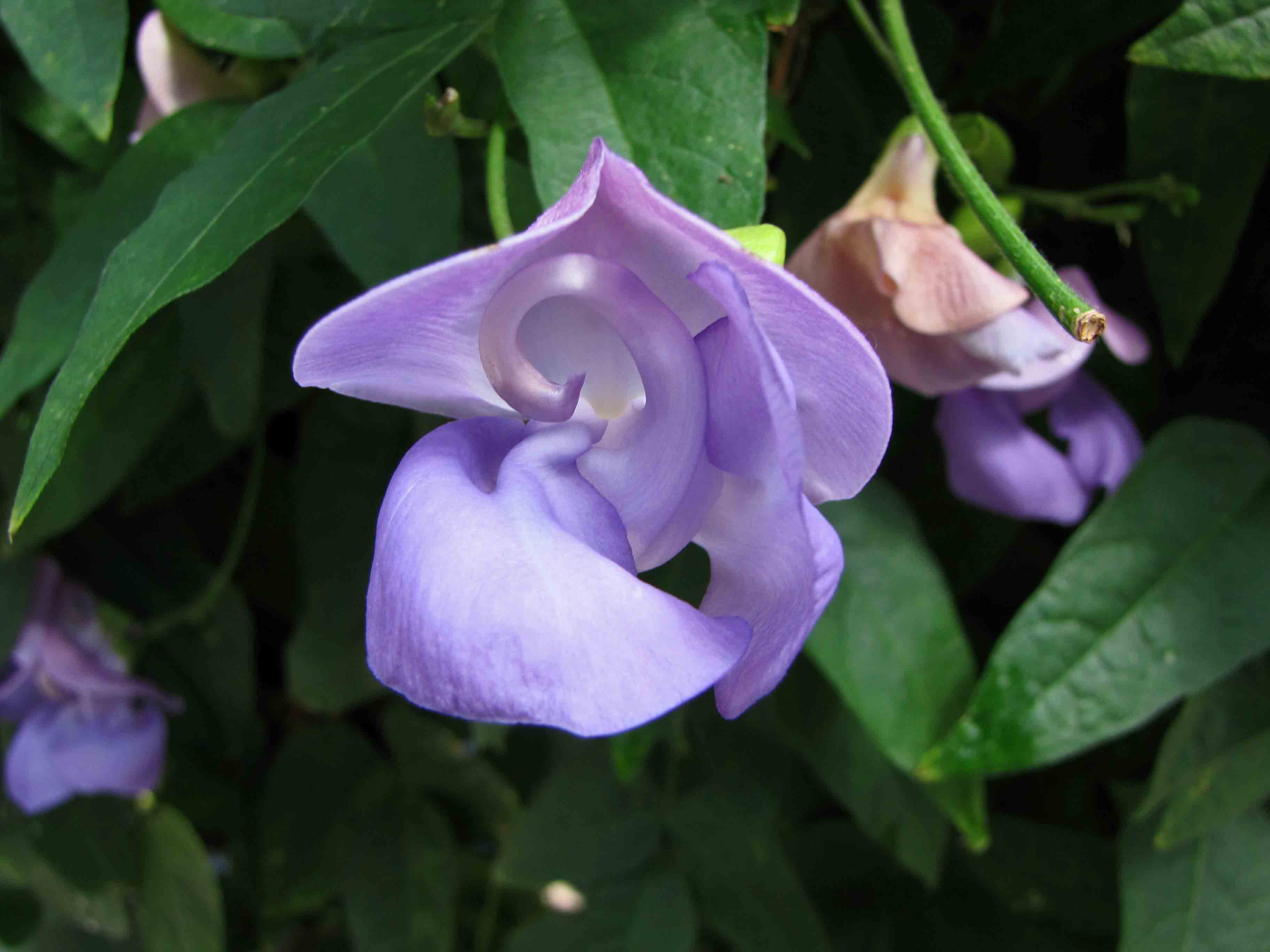
- Sigmoidotropis speciosa

Scientific classification
- Kingdom: Plantae
- Clade: Tracheophytes
- Clade: Angiosperms
- Clade: Eudicots
- Clade: Rosids
- Order: Fabales
- Family: Fabaceae
- Subfamily: Faboideae
- Subtribe: Phaseolinae
- Genus: Sigmoidotropis (Piper) A. Delgado (2011)

Type species
- Sigmoidotropis speciosa (Kunth) A. Delgado

Species
- Sigmoidotropis ampla (Bentham) R. Ram. & A. Delgado; Sigmoidotropis antillana (Urban) A. Delgado; Sigmoidotropis ekmaniana (Urban) A. Delgado; Sigmoidotropis elegans (Piper) A. Delgado; Sigmoidotropis grandiflora (Steudal) A. Delgado; Sigmoidotropis megatyla (Piper) A. Delgado; Sigmoidotropis polytyla (Harms) A. Delgado; Sigmoidotropis speciosa (Kunth) A. Delgado

Synonyms
- Phaseolus sect. Sigmoidotropis Piper, 1926; Vigna subg. Sigmoidotropis (Piper) Verdc., 1970; Vigna sect. Sigmoidotropis (Piper) Maréchal et al., 1978

= Sigmoidotropis =

Genus of legumes

Sigmoidotropis is a genus of flowering plants in the legume family, Fabaceae. It includes eight species native to the tropical Americas, ranging from northern Mexico and the Caribbean islands to southern Brazil. It belongs to the subfamily Faboideae. Species in this genus were formerly considered to belong to the genus Vigna.
