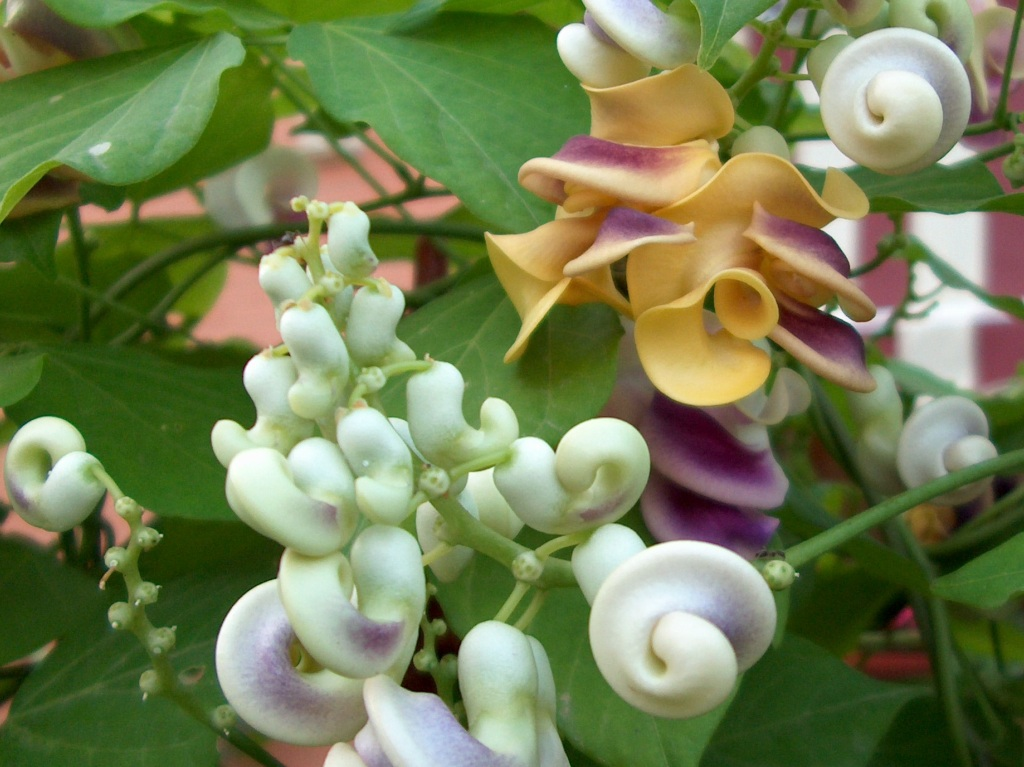
- The curled flowers of C. caracalla

Scientific classification
- Kingdom: Plantae
- Clade: Embryophytes
- Clade: Tracheophytes
- Clade: Spermatophytes
- Clade: Angiosperms
- Clade: Eudicots
- Clade: Rosids
- Order: Fabales
- Family: Fabaceae
- Subfamily: Faboideae
- Subtribe: Phaseolinae
- Genus: Cochliasanthus; Trew
- Species: C. caracalla

Binomial name
- Cochliasanthus caracalla (L.) Trew

Synonyms
- Vigna subg. Cochliasanthus (Trew) Verdc.; Phaseolus sect. Caracallae DC.; Vigna sect. Caracallae (DC.) Maréchal et al.; Vigna caracalla (L.) Verdc.; Cochliasanthus caracalla (L.) Trew

= Cochliasanthus =

Cochliasanthus caracalla

Genus of legumes

Cochliasanthus caracalla is a leguminous flowering plant in the family Fabaceae that originates in tropical South America and Central America. The species is named caracalla, a corruption of the Portuguese caracol, meaning snail.. Thomas Jefferson called this plant "the most beautiful bean in the world".

It is the only member of the genus Cochliasanthus and was formerly considered to belong to the genus Vigna. This perennial vine (when grown in a climate without frost) has fragrant flowers said to be reminiscent of hyacinths - with a distinctive curled shape, giving rise to the common names corkscrew vine, snail vine, snail creeper, snailflower or snail bean; however, two very different plant species are sold and cultivated under the "snail-" names, the other one being Sigmoidotropis speciosa.

== Description ==
The purple, non-fragrant flowers of the Sigmoidotropis speciosa are said to have snail-shell shaped flowers, hence the origin of the common name. The multicolored, fragrant flowers of the Cochliasanthus caracalla are said to have corkscrew or nautilus-shell shaped flowers, hence the origin of that common name. Though some claim that the leaves of one species are darker and differently sized compared to the leaves of the other, it is difficult to distinguish between these two plants through foliage alone.

There have been multiple instances where both plants have been grown side by side for years and the discovery that they were not the same species was made only after the less mature plant finally bloomed. C. caracalla is pollinated by bumblebees and carpenter bees in its native range in Argentina.

=== Corkscrew vine ===
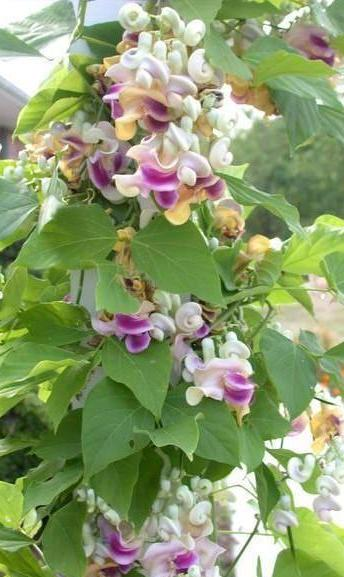
Multicolored wavy flowers and spiral buds hanging in clusters

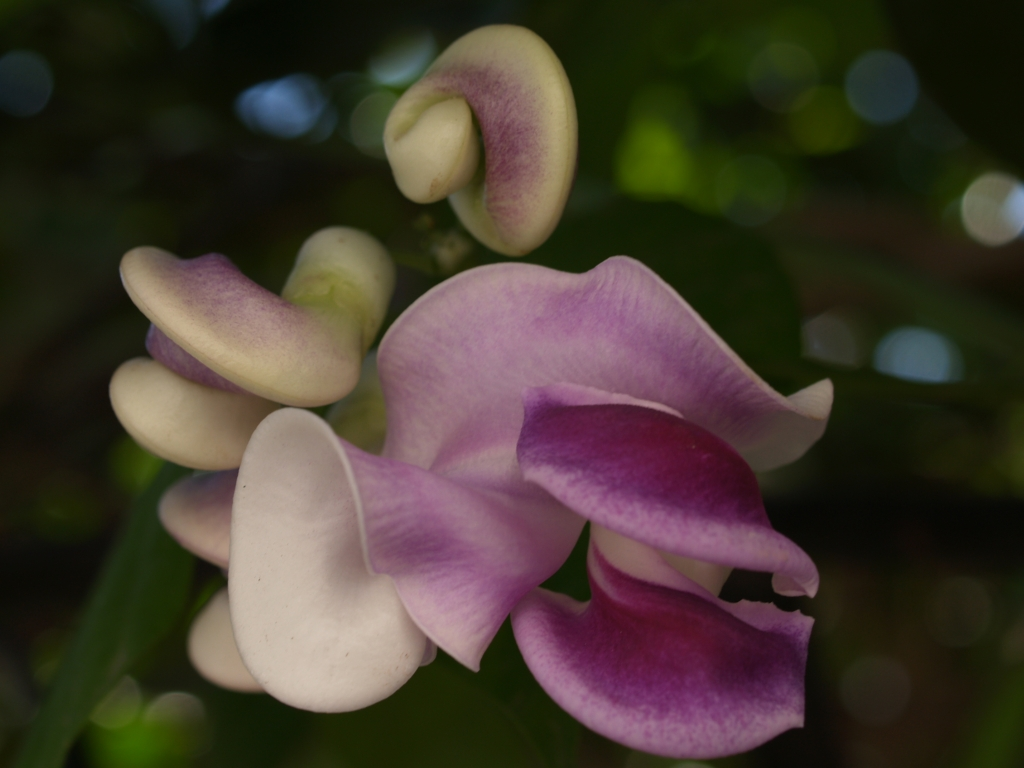
Wavy, purple-streaked white petals surrounded by immature, spiral-shaped buds of the same color.

The corkscrew vine, Cochliasanthus caracalla, has highly fragrant, multicolored, corkscrew or spiral shaped flowers and is not an invasive plant.

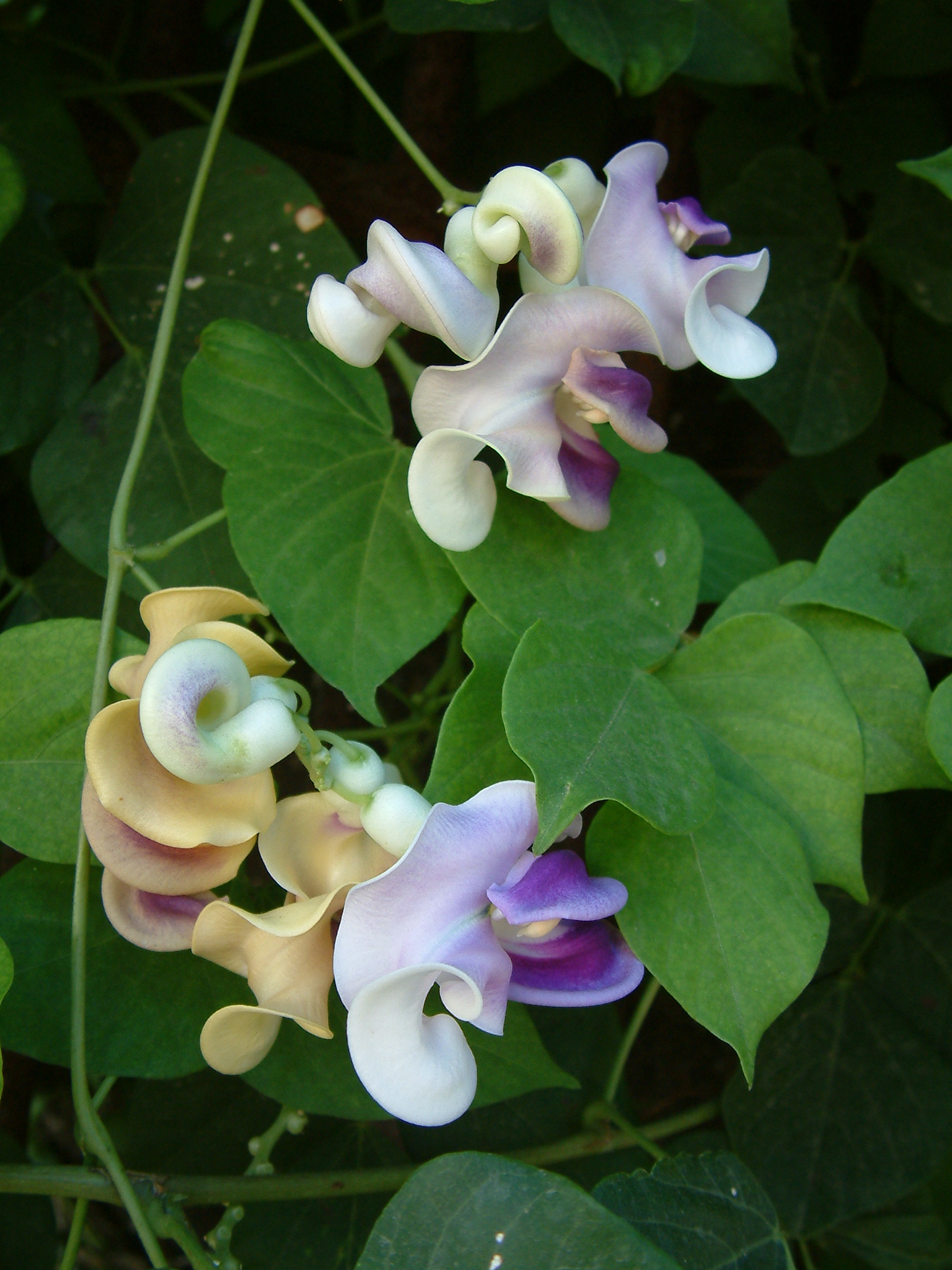
This image illustrates how truly unique the shape and colors of this plant's petals are.

More specifically, the flowers are white with purple streaks that fade to cream and then to yellow with age. They hang in twelve-inch long clusters. The flowers are extremely wavy and immature blossoms very much resemble multicolored spirals or corkscrews. This plant grows white buds that produce nectar, which attracts ants, who then pollinate the flowers. The fragrance has been likened to Chinese wisteria, Jasmine, and Magnolia. It is claimed that the plant can be smelled from 15 feet away. The Corkscrew Vine is less frost tolerant than the Snail Vine.

== Cultivation ==
This vine is hardy in zones 9 and above, liking full sun and consistently damp soil. It prefers high heat and humidity. In colder zones, it does well in a pot if it is overwintered inside.

=== Harvest ===
Flowers typically bloom in late summer or autumn and, if pollination by bees is successful, seeds come soon after. Seeds grow inside pods, like pea pods. If the grower wants to cultivate them, pods should be removed from the plant while still green to prevent exposure to winter temperatures. The seeds, which are technically beans, could be edible. Parts of the true Corkscrew plant might be poisonous.

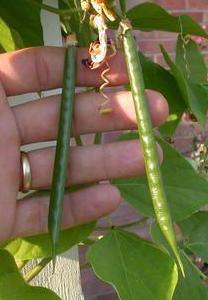
Corkscrew vine seedpods

=== Preparation ===
There is disagreement among growers on whether nicking the seed coat is more harmful or helpful to germination and some support nicking, while others recommend against it. One practice that may work is to soak seeds overnight in warm water.

=== Sowing ===
Burpee recommends that the seeds be sown in "ordinary soil in a sunny area in spring after danger of frost" has passed. The seeds should be planted two to three inches apart and covered with half an inch of "fine soil". Burpee then recommends growers to "firm lightly" the soil and "keep evenly moist".

The seedlings will sprout in one to three weeks depending on the weather. If grown indoors or inside a greenhouse, then the seedlings can be moved outdoors when "spring temperatures remain above 50 F." These plants will thrive in full sun to partial shade and can attain a height of twenty feet.

This species can be grown from cuttings.
