= Afrotrewia =

Conservation status
- Least Concern (IUCN 3.1)

Scientific classification
- Kingdom: Plantae
- Clade: Tracheophytes
- Clade: Angiosperms
- Clade: Eudicots
- Clade: Rosids
- Order: Malpighiales
- Family: Euphorbiaceae
- Genus: Afrotrewia; Pax & K.Hoffm.
- Species: A. kamerunica

Binomial name
- Afrotrewia kamerunica Pax & K.Hoffm.

Species of flowering plant

Afrotrewia is a monotypic genus of flowering plants belonging to the family Euphorbiaceae. It only contains one known species, Afrotrewia kamerunica Pax & K.Hoffm.

Its native range is western central Tropical Africa, within Cameroon and Gabon.

The genus name of Afrotrewia is in honour of Christoph Jacob Trew (1695–1769), a German botanist and illustrator. The Latin specific epithet of kamerunica refers to coming from Cameroon, where the plant was found. Both the genus and the species were first described and published in H.G.A.Engler (ed.), Das Pflanzenreich, IV, 147, VII on page 14 in 1914.

The genus is recognized by the United States Department of Agriculture and the Agricultural Research Service, but they do not list any known species.
