= Christoph Jacob Trew =

German physician and botanist (1695-1769)

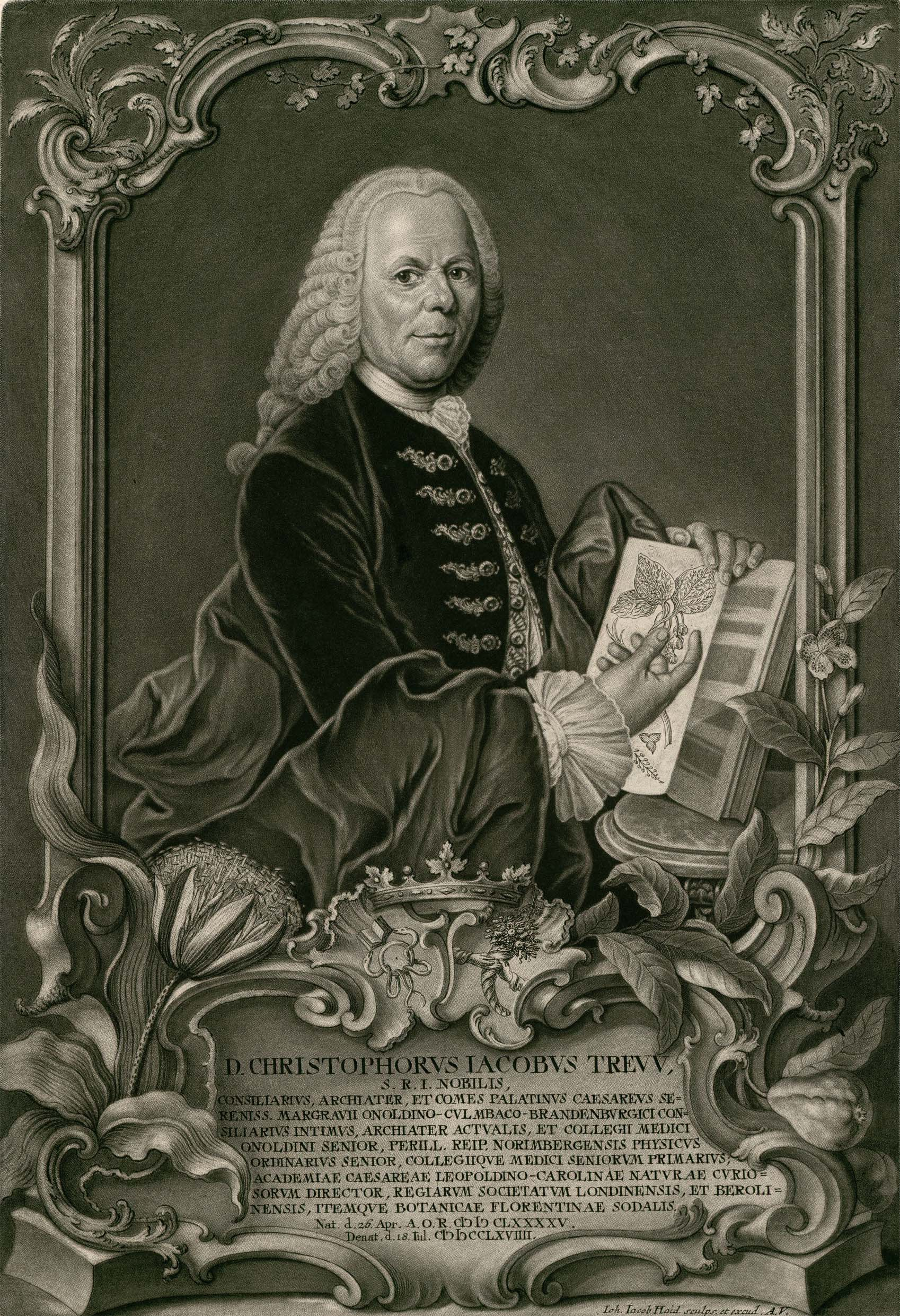
- An engraving of Trew by J.J. Haid, shown with his holding his Plantae selectae before him
- Born: 16 April 1695; Lauf an der Pegnitz
- Died: 18 July 1769 (aged 74); Nuremberg
- Scientific career
- Fields: Botany
- Author abbrev. (botany): Trew

Christoph Jacob Trew (16 April 1695 in Lauf an der Pegnitz – 18 July 1769) was a German physician and botanist. He described numerous plants and published several richly illustrated works. He also brought together a rich collections of medical books of the period gathering nearly 34000 books which were donated to the University of Altdorf and later moved to the Erlangen University library.

== Life and work ==
Trew was born in Lauf near Nuremberg where his father was a chemist. He graduated in medicine from the University of Altdorf in 1717. His dissertation was made under the surgeon and botanist Lorenz Heister (1683–1758). He then travelled as part of the peregrinatio academica or grand tour around Europe for three years, making friends in Switzerland, Leiden, Danzig and Königsberg. He also collected books and works. In 1720 Heister moved to Helmstedt and recommended Trew as a replacement for his position. This was however not accepted and he returned in 1720 to his hometown as a general practitioner. He continued to keep a correspondence with physicians and botanists he met on his travels. He was originally a city solicitor, court physician, Count Palatine of the Holy Roman Empire, an advisor to the Margrave of Brandenburg-Ansbach. In 1721 he settled in Nuremberg as a physician and in 1723 he married a wealthy widow ten years older than him and acquired a large house in 1728 where he grew plants and grew his library. He was then elected to the local Collegium Medicum and supervised the Nuremberg's Theatrum Anatomicum as well as the Hortus Medicus, where plants of use in medicine where grown. He made use of these two positions while studying plants, getting help from students and illustrators. In 1730 he sought to produce an illustrated Opus anatomicum in six to eight volumes but only realized one part on the anatomy of the skull. Along with other colleagues he founded a journal Commercium Litterarium, ad rei medicae et scientiae naturali incrementum (Learned Correspondence to the Advancement of Medicine and the Natural Sciences) in 1731. He was a member of the Leopoldina Academy and the Royal Society of London (elected 17 April 1746), the Berlin Academy, and the Florentine Botanical Society. His interest in botany then led him to sponsor the publication of illustrated botanical books.

In 1732, Christoph Jacob Trew saw some of Georg Ehret's drawings. Ehret was a botanist and illustrator, from Heidelberg, Germany. Liking them, Trew then became Ehret's patron. Ehret sent many paintings to Trew over the next few years. Between 1750 and 1773 Trew began Plantae Selectae Quarum Imagines (it was published in Nuremberg). It has many illustrations by Georg Ehret. Trew wrote the plant descriptions. Up to 16 new names of plants were published by Trew in the series; including Cochliasanthus Trew. Benedict Christoph Vogel completed some of the unfinished works of Trew after his death in 1769.

In 1914, botanists Pax & K.Hoffm. erected the monotypic African genus Afrotrewia in the family Euphorbiaceae, named in Trew's honour.
