= Vegetative =

Vegetative describes vegetation. Vegetative may also refer to:

- Vegetative reproduction, a type of asexual reproduction for plants
- Persistent vegetative state, a condition of people with severe brain damage
- Plant community, sometimes called a vegetative community, a collection of plants in a geographic area
- Vegetative (or somatic) cell, a non-reproductive cell
