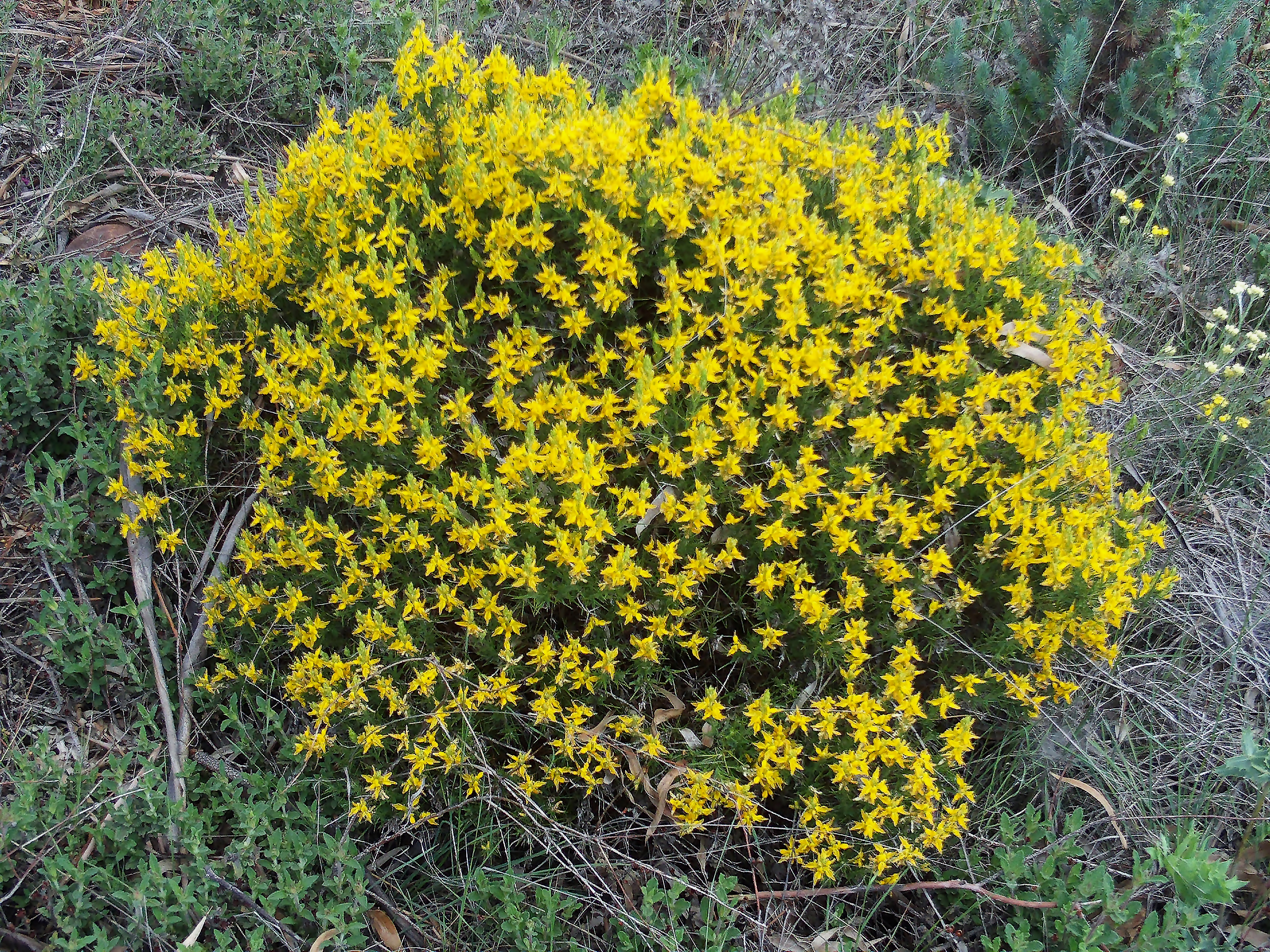
- Genista hirsuta

Scientific classification
- Kingdom: Plantae
- Clade: Tracheophytes
- Clade: Angiosperms
- Clade: Eudicots
- Clade: Rosids
- Order: Fabales
- Family: Fabaceae
- Subfamily: Faboideae
- Clade: Meso-Papilionoideae
- Clade: Genistoids; Wojciechowski et al. 2004

Tribes
- Brongniartieae; Camoensieae; Core Genistoids Crisp et al. 2000; Crotalarieae; Genisteae; Podalyrieae; Sophoreae; Leptolobieae; Ormosieae; Genera and species incertae sedis; Clathrotropis macrocarpa Ducke; Haplormosia Harms; Oberholzeria Swanepoel et al. 2015; Orphanodendron Barneby & J.W.Grimes; Pericopsis Thwaites; Sakoanala R. Vig.

Synonyms
- Genistoids sensu lato; Genistoid alliance sensu Polhill 1981

= Genistoids =

Genistoids Temporal range: Late Paleocene - recent

Clade of legumes

The Genistoids are one of the major radiations in the plant family Fabaceae. Members of this phylogenetic clade are primarily found in the Southern Hemisphere. Some genera are pollinated by birds. The genistoid clade is consistently resolved as monophyletic in molecular phylogenetic analyses. It is estimated to have arisen 56.4 ± 0.2 million years ago (in the Paleocene). A node-based definition for the genistoids is: "the MRCA of Poecilanthe parviflora and Lupinus argenteus." One morphological synapomorphy has been tentatively identified: production of quinolizidine alkaloids. Some genera also accumulate pyrrolizidine. A new genus, to be segregated from Clathrotropis, has also been proposed to occupy an undetermined position within the genistoid clade.

== Core Genistoids ==
The core genistoids, also known as the genistoids sensu stricto, comprise most of the tribes of the genistoids sensu lato, and are found mainly in Africa and Eurasia. This subclade is also consistently resolved as monophyletic. A node-based definition for the core genistoids is: "the MRCA of Bolusanthus speciosus and Spartium junceum."

== Systematics ==
Modern molecular phylogenetics suggest the following relationships:

- - Dermatophyllum (outgroup)
  - Genistoids
    - Ormosieae
    - - Clathrotropis macrocarpa
      - - - Camoensieae
          - Pericopsis
        - - - - Leptolobieae
              - Orphanodendron
            - - Haplormosia
              - Brongniartieae
          - Core Genistoids
            - Sophoreae
            - - Podalyrieae
              - - Oberholzeria
                - - Crotalarieae
                  - Genisteae
