= Camoensia =

Camoensia is a taxonomical division of genus in both plantae and animalia:

- Camoensia (plant)
- Camoensia (insect)
