= Guianodendron =

Scientific classification
- Kingdom: Plantae
- Clade: Tracheophytes
- Clade: Angiosperms
- Clade: Eudicots
- Clade: Rosids
- Order: Fabales
- Family: Fabaceae
- Subfamily: Faboideae
- Tribe: Leptolobieae
- Genus: Guianodendron; Sch. Rodr. & A.M.G. Azevedo (2006)
- Species: G. praeclarum

Binomial name
- Guianodendron praeclarum (Sandwith) Sch. Rodr. & A.M.G. Azevedo (2006)

Synonyms
- Acosmium sect. Praeclara Yakovlev; Acosmium praeclarum (Sandwith) Yakovlev (1969); Sweetia praeclara Sandwith (1947)

Genus of legumes

Guianodendron praeclarum is a South American legume endemic to the Guiana Shield. It is the only member of the genus Guianodendron. It has been segregated from Acosmium based on its unique combination of vegetative and floral traits, and it is related to Diplotropis. It is the only member of the genus Guianodendron.
