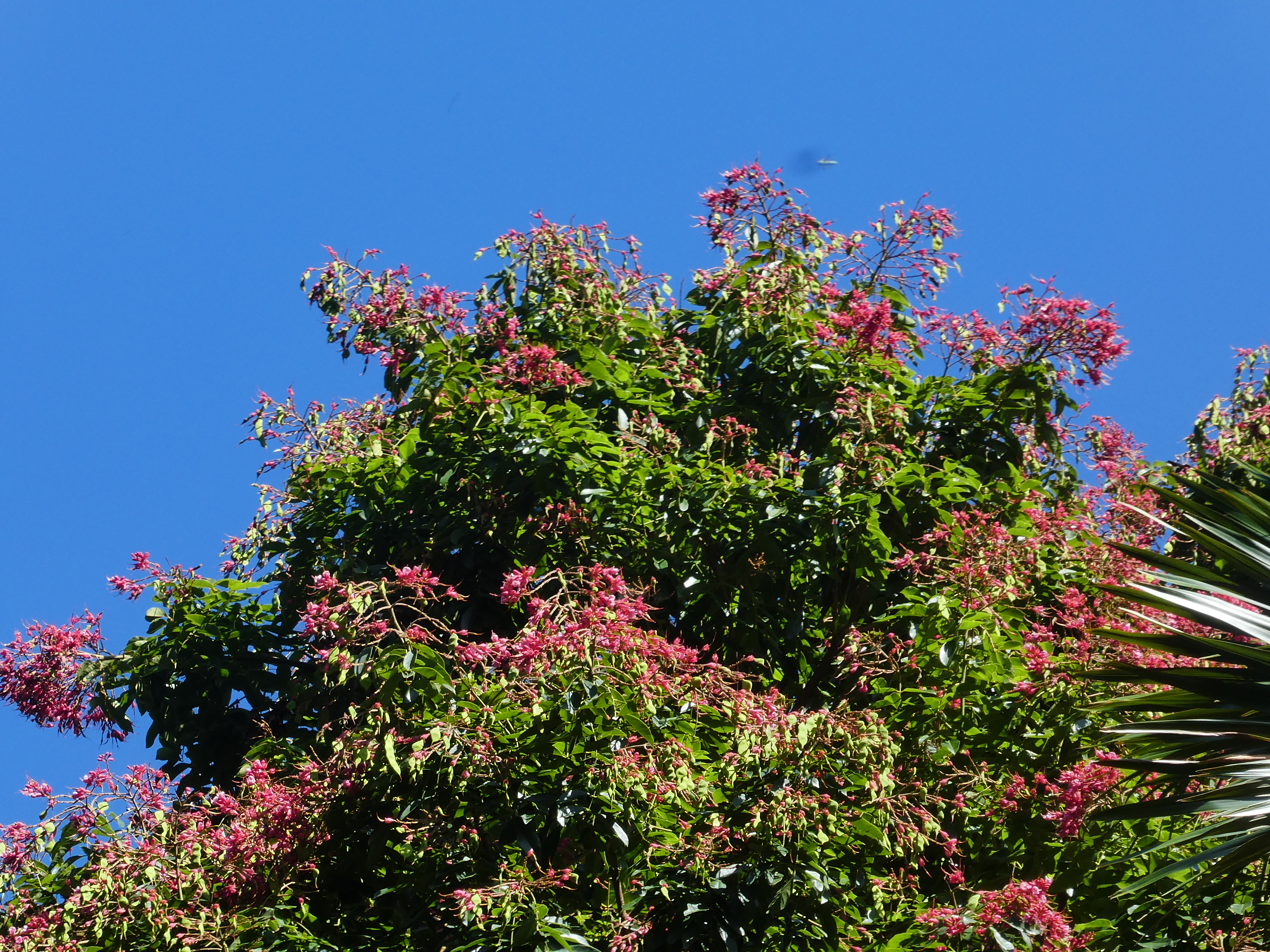
- Ormosia ormondii

Scientific classification
- Kingdom: Plantae
- Clade: Embryophytes
- Clade: Tracheophytes
- Clade: Angiosperms
- Clade: Eudicots
- Clade: Rosids
- Order: Fabales
- Family: Fabaceae
- Subfamily: Faboideae
- Clade: Meso-Papilionoideae
- Clade: Genistoids
- Tribe: Ormosieae; Yakovlev

Genera
- Clathrotropis (Benth.) Harms; Haplormosia Harms; Ormosia Jacks.; Panurea Spruce ex Benth. & Hook. f.; Petaladenium Ducke; Spirotropis Tul.

Synonyms
- Ormosia clade Cardoso et al. 2012; Ormosia group sensu Polhill 1994; Sophoreae sensu Polhill 1981 pro parte 6

= Ormosieae =

Tribe of legumes

The tribe Ormosieae is one of the subdivisions of the plant family Fabaceae, primarily found in tropical regions of the Americas, but also in southeast Asia and northern Australia. The members of this tribe were formerly included in tribe Sophoreae, but were recently circumscribed into a new tribe. The members of this tribe consistently form a monophyletic clade in molecular phylogenetic analyses. The tribe does not currently have a node-based definition, but morphological synapomorphies have been tentatively identified: "mostly dehiscent pods with woody valves" and "tufts of minute colleter-like glands in the axils of bract and bracteoles". Like other genistoids, members of tribe Ormosieae are known to produce quinolizidine alkaloids.
