= Spirotropis =

Spirotropis is the scientific name of two genera of organisms and may refer to:

- Spirotropis (gastropod), a genus of gastropods in the family Drilliidae
- Spirotropis (plant), a genus of plants in the family Fabaceae
