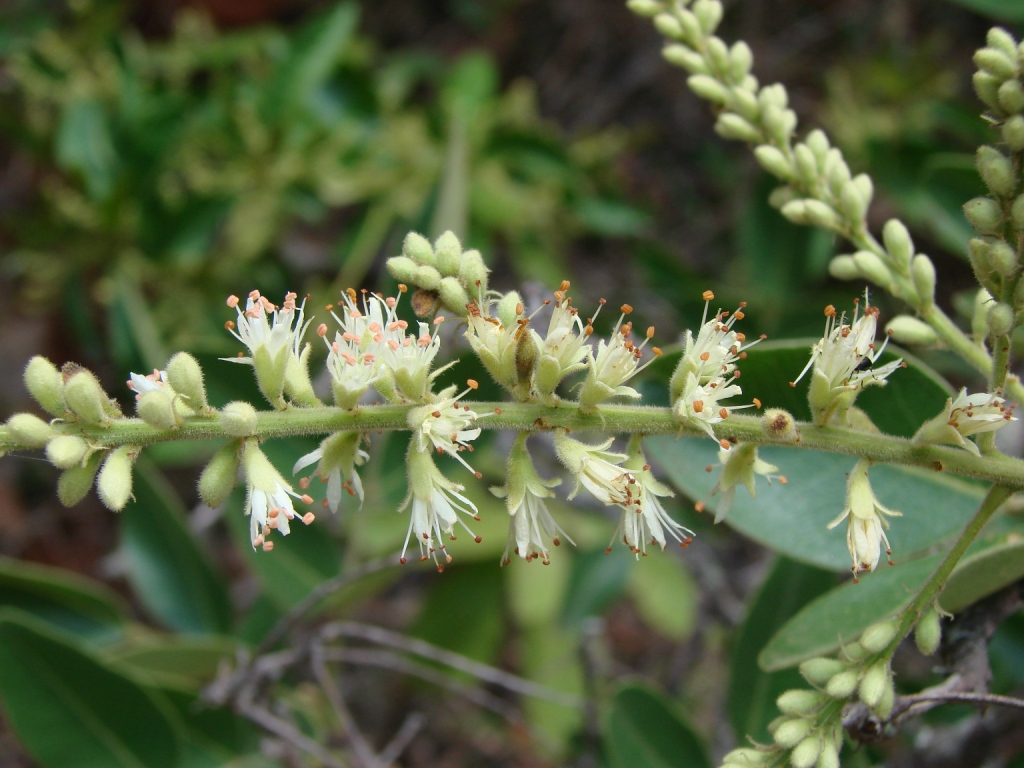
- Leptolobium dasycarpum

Scientific classification
- Kingdom: Plantae
- Clade: Tracheophytes
- Clade: Angiosperms
- Clade: Eudicots
- Clade: Rosids
- Order: Fabales
- Family: Fabaceae
- Subfamily: Faboideae
- Clade: Meso-Papilionoideae
- Clade: Genistoids
- Tribe: Leptolobieae (Benth.) Cardoso et al. 2013

Genera
- Bowdichia Kunth; Diplotropis Benth.; Guianodendron Sch. Rodr. & A. M. G. Azevedo; Leptolobium Vogel; Staminodianthus D.B.O.S. Cardoso, H.C. Lima & L.P. Queiroz

Synonyms
- Bowdichia clade Cardoso et al. 2012

= Leptolobieae =

Leptolobieae Temporal range: Late Paleocene - recent

Clade of legumes

Leptolobieae is a Neotropical, early-branching monophyletic clade of the flowering plant subfamily Faboideae or Papilionaceae that are mostly found in South America.

== Description ==
This tribe is composed of five genera, two of which were originally included in the genus Acosmium (Guianodendron and Leptolobium) and one of which was originally assigned to the genus Diplotropis (Staminodianthus). All of these genera were traditionally included in the tribe Sophoreae. However, recent molecular phylogenetic analyses resolved these five genera into a strongly-supported monophyletic clade, which warranted the reinstatement of the tribe Leptolobieae. A potential morphological synapomorphy for the tribe is: "tufts of minute colleter-like glands in the axils of bract and bracteoles".
