= Orphanodendron bernalii =

Conservation status
- Least Concern (IUCN 3.1)

Scientific classification
- Kingdom: Plantae
- Clade: Tracheophytes
- Clade: Angiosperms
- Clade: Eudicots
- Clade: Rosids
- Order: Fabales
- Family: Fabaceae
- Subfamily: Faboideae
- Genus: Orphanodendron
- Species: O. bernalii

Binomial name
- Orphanodendron bernalii Barneby & J.W.Grimes

Species of legume

Orphanodendron bernalii is a species of legume in the family Fabaceae. It is found only in Colombia.
