= Pericopsis angolensis =

Conservation status
- Least Concern (IUCN 3.1)

Scientific classification
- Kingdom: Plantae
- Clade: Tracheophytes
- Clade: Angiosperms
- Clade: Eudicots
- Clade: Rosids
- Order: Fabales
- Family: Fabaceae
- Subfamily: Faboideae
- Genus: Pericopsis
- Species: P. angolensis

Binomial name
- Pericopsis angolensis (Baker) Meeuwen

Species of plant

Pericopsis angolensis is a deciduous small to medium-sized tree within the Fabaceae family.

== Description ==
Pericopsis angolensis grows as a shrub or as a small to medium-sized tree capable of reaching 20 m tall, sometimes up to 27 m. The bark of younger trees is often smooth but becomes fissurred and flaky when mature; the bark is light grey to brown in color and the slash is yellowish and fibrous. Leaves are alternate and imparipinnately compound with stipules and petioles present. Leaflets are ovate to elliptical in shape, can reach up to 9.5 cm long and 5 cm wide, cuneate to rounded at the base and notched to rounded at the top. The inflorescence is often arranged in panicles.

=== Wood ===
Its woods is hard and heavy and the heartwood is greenish brown and the sapwood yellow-grey.

== Infraspecies ==
- Pericopsis angolensis f. angolensis
- Pericopsis angolensis f. brasseuriana (De Wild.) Brummitt
- Pericopsis angolensis f. intermedia Yakovlev

== Distribution and habitat ==
The species is native to Central and Tropical Africa, it is found in woodlands and wooded grassland. It is a common timber tree in the Miombo ecoregion.

== Chemistry ==
Methanol and chloroform extracts of the species resulted in the isolation of 3,9-dimethoxypterocarpan, a derivative of Isoflavanoids and 3,4,3',5'-tetrahydroxystilbene, a stilbenol.

== Uses ==
Its wood is used in construction and furniture making.
