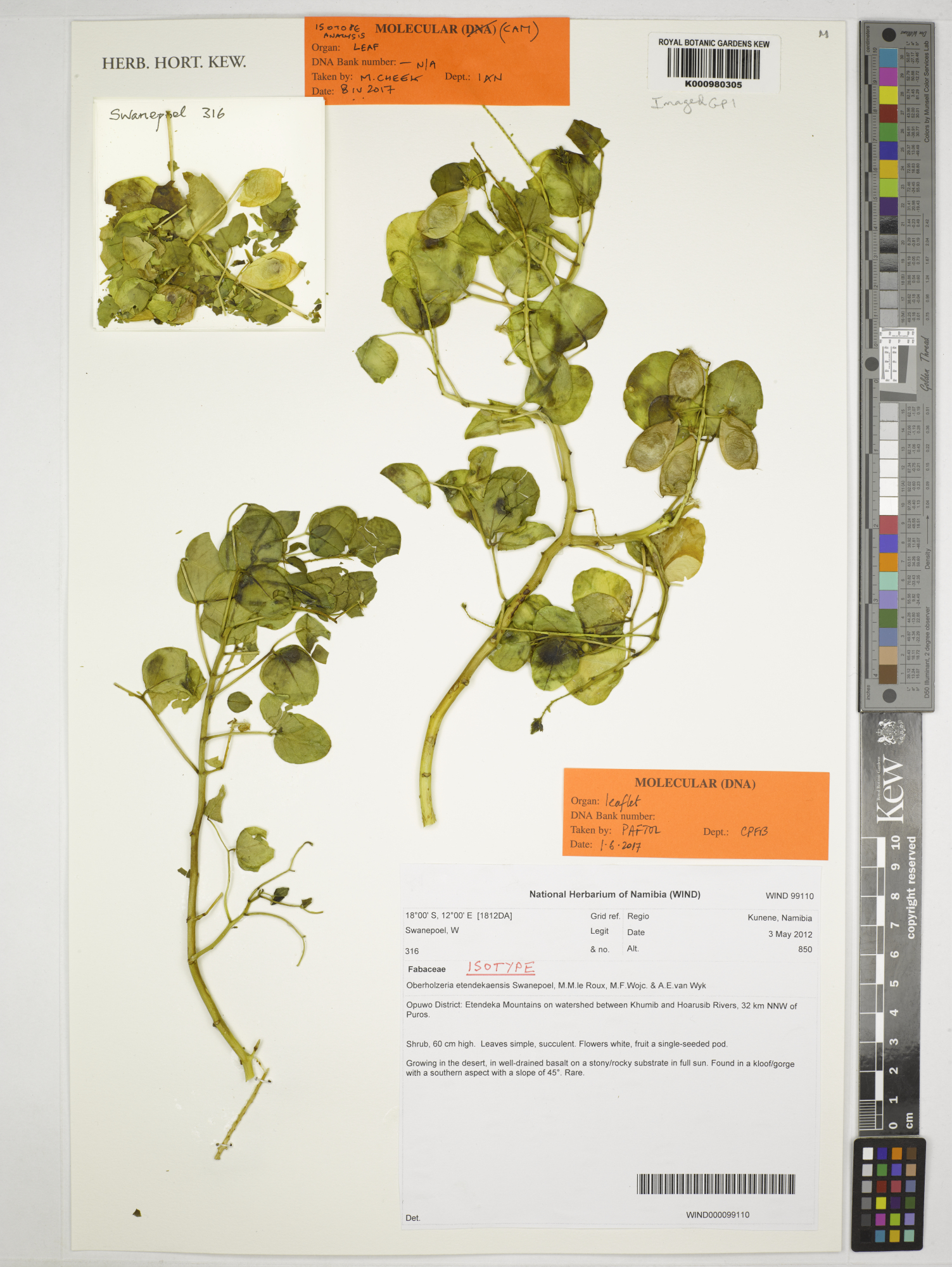

Scientific classification
- Kingdom: Plantae
- Clade: Embryophytes
- Clade: Tracheophytes
- Clade: Angiosperms
- Clade: Eudicots
- Clade: Rosids
- Order: Fabales
- Family: Fabaceae
- Subfamily: Faboideae
- Clade: Genistoids
- Clade: Core genistoids
- Genus: Oberholzeria; Swanepoel, M.M.le Roux, M.F.Wojc. & A.E.van Wyk (2015)
- Species: O. etendekaensis

Binomial name
- Oberholzeria etendekaensis Swanepoel, M.M.le Roux, M.F.Wojc. & A.E.van Wyk (2015)

= Oberholzeria =

Genus of legumes

Oberholzeria is a monotypic genus of flowering plants in the legume family, Fabaceae. It only contains one known species, Oberholzeria etendekaensis which is endemic to Namibia. It belongs to the subfamily Faboideae, though its tribal affiliation is unclear.

The genus and species were circumscribed by Wessel Swanepoel, Margaretha Marianne le Roux, Martin F. Wojciechowski and Abraham Erasmus Van Wyk in PLoS ONE 10(3): e122080 (11+12) in 2015.

The genus name of Oberholzeria is in honour of Johanna Allettha Oberholzer (b.1965) who is married to South African botanist and genus author Wessel Swanepoel.
