= Staminodianthus =

Scientific classification
- Kingdom: Plantae
- Clade: Tracheophytes
- Clade: Angiosperms
- Clade: Eudicots
- Clade: Rosids
- Order: Fabales
- Family: Fabaceae
- Subfamily: Faboideae
- Tribe: Leptolobieae
- Genus: Staminodianthus; D.B.O.S.Cardoso, H.C.Lima & L.P.Queiroz (2013)

Species
- Staminodianthus duckei (Yakovlev) D.B.O.S. Cardoso & H.C. Lima; Staminodianthus racemosus (Hoehne) D.B.O.S. Cardoso & H.C. Lima; Staminodianthus rosae (H.C. Lima) D.B.O.S. Cardoso & H.C. Lima

Synonyms
- Diplotropis sect. Racemosae H.C. Lima

Genus of legumes

Staminodianthus is a genus of trees (family Fabaceae) found in South America. It includes three species of trees, from small trees to six meters tall to large trees up to 40 m tall. They are native to the Amazon Basin of northern Brazil, Colombia, Guyana, Peru, and Venezuela, where they grow in humid non-flooded terra-firme forests on sandy or sandy loam soils, gallery forests, and highland savannas.

A dichotomous key for the species is available.
