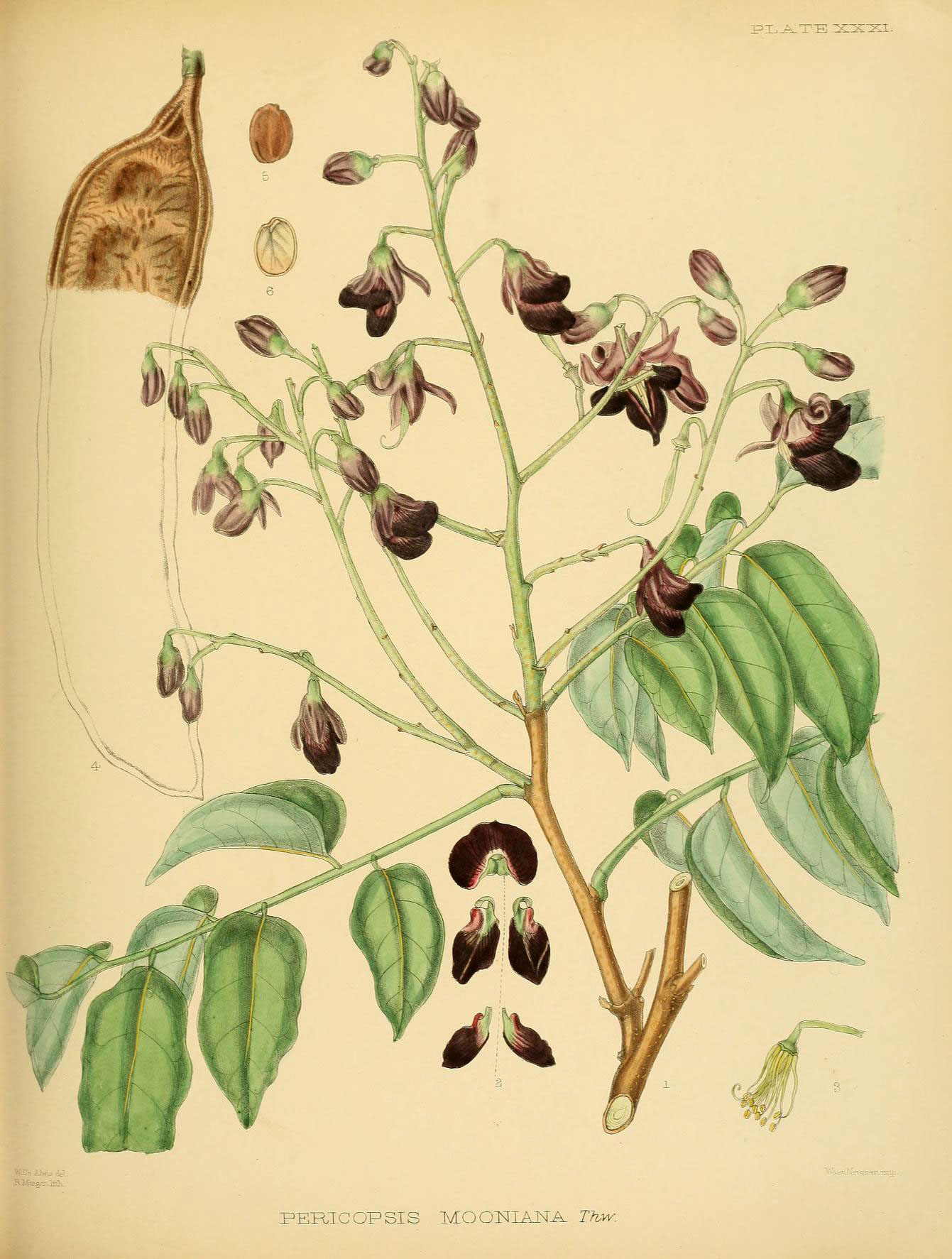
- Nedun tree, Pericopsis mooniana

Scientific classification
- Kingdom: Plantae
- Clade: Tracheophytes
- Clade: Angiosperms
- Clade: Eudicots
- Clade: Rosids
- Order: Fabales
- Family: Fabaceae
- Subfamily: Faboideae
- Clade: Meso-Papilionoideae
- Clade: Genistoids
- Genus: Pericopsis; Thwaites (1864)

Species
- 4; see text

Synonyms
- Afrormosia Harms (1906)

= Pericopsis =

Genus of legumes

Pericopsis is a genus of flowering plants in the legume family, Fabaceae. It includes four species of trees and shrubs, three native to sub-Saharan Africa and one to Sri Lanka, Malesia, New Guinea, and the Caroline Islands. Typical habitats include tropical lowland forest (including riverine or mangrove forests for the Asian species) and seasonally-dry woodland and wooded grassland.

Trees of the genus provide excellent timber which is used as a substitute for teak in cabinet work and furniture making.

== Species ==
Pericopsis comprises the following species:

- Pericopsis angolensis (Baker) Meeuwen
- Pericopsis elata (Harms) Meeuwen — African teak
- Pericopsis laxiflora (Baker) Meeuwen
- Pericopsis mooniana Thwaites — Nandu wood
