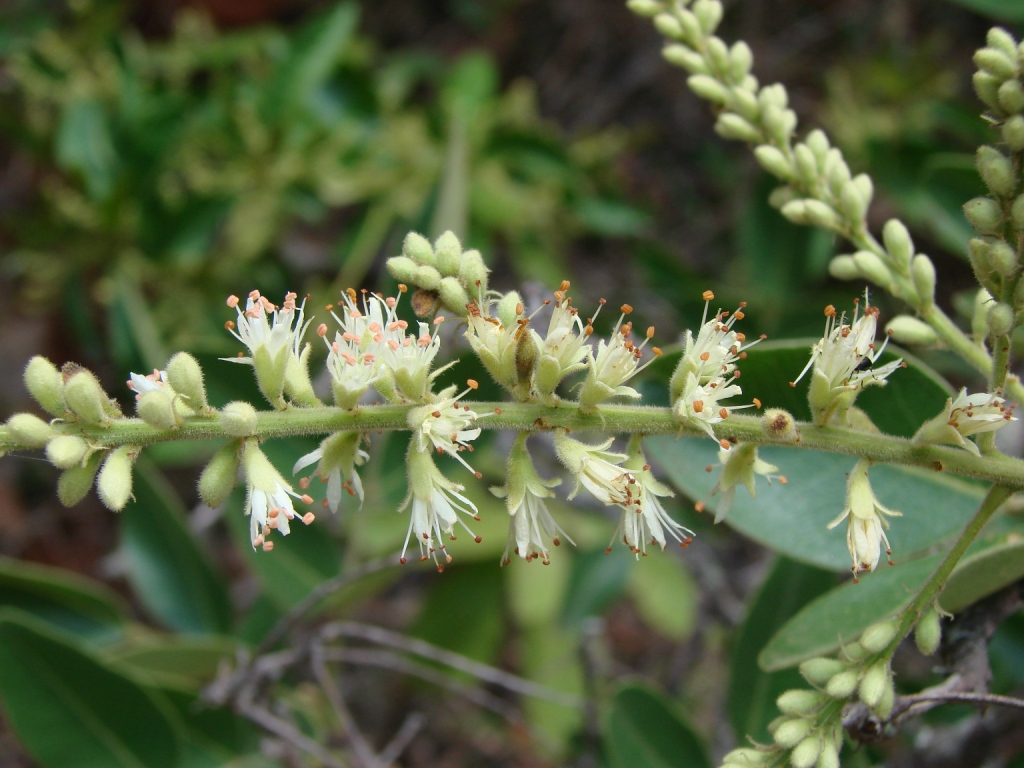
- Leptolobium dasycarpum

Scientific classification
- Kingdom: Plantae
- Clade: Tracheophytes
- Clade: Angiosperms
- Clade: Eudicots
- Clade: Rosids
- Order: Fabales
- Family: Fabaceae
- Subfamily: Faboideae
- Tribe: Leptolobieae
- Genus: Leptolobium; Vogel (1837)

Sections and species
- See text

= Leptolobium =

Genus of legumes

Leptolobium is a small Neotropical genus of plants in the family Fabaceae, with 12 species currently recognized. With the exception of Leptolobium panamense, which occurs in tropical forests from northwestern South America to Mexico, all species of Leptolobium are restricted to South America and most diverse in Brazil. Most Leptolobium species have been traditionally included in Acosmium Schott (Fabaceae), but both genera have been recently distinguished based on several vegetative and reproductive traits.

== Species ==
Leptolobium comprises the following species:

- Section Leptolobium (Vogel) Yakovlev
  - Leptolobium araguaiense Sch.Rodr. & A.M.G. Azevedo
  - Leptolobium dasycarpum Vogel
  - Leptolobium elegans Vogel
  - Leptolobium glaziovianum (Harms) Sch.Rodr. & A.M.G.Azevedo
  - Leptolobium multijugum Sch.Rodr. & A.M.G. Azevedo
  - Leptolobium nitens Vogel
  - Leptolobium panamense (Benth.) Sch.Rodr. & A.M.G. Azevedo
  - Leptolobium parvifolium (Harms) Sch.Rodr. & A.M.G. Azevedo
  - Leptolobium stirtonii (G.A. Aymard & V. González) Sch. Rodr. & A.M.G
  - Leptolobium tenuifolium Vogel
- Section Mesitis (Vogel) Yakovlev
  - Leptolobium bijugum Vogel
  - Leptolobium brachystachyum(Benth.) Sch.Rodr. & A.M.G. Azevedo
