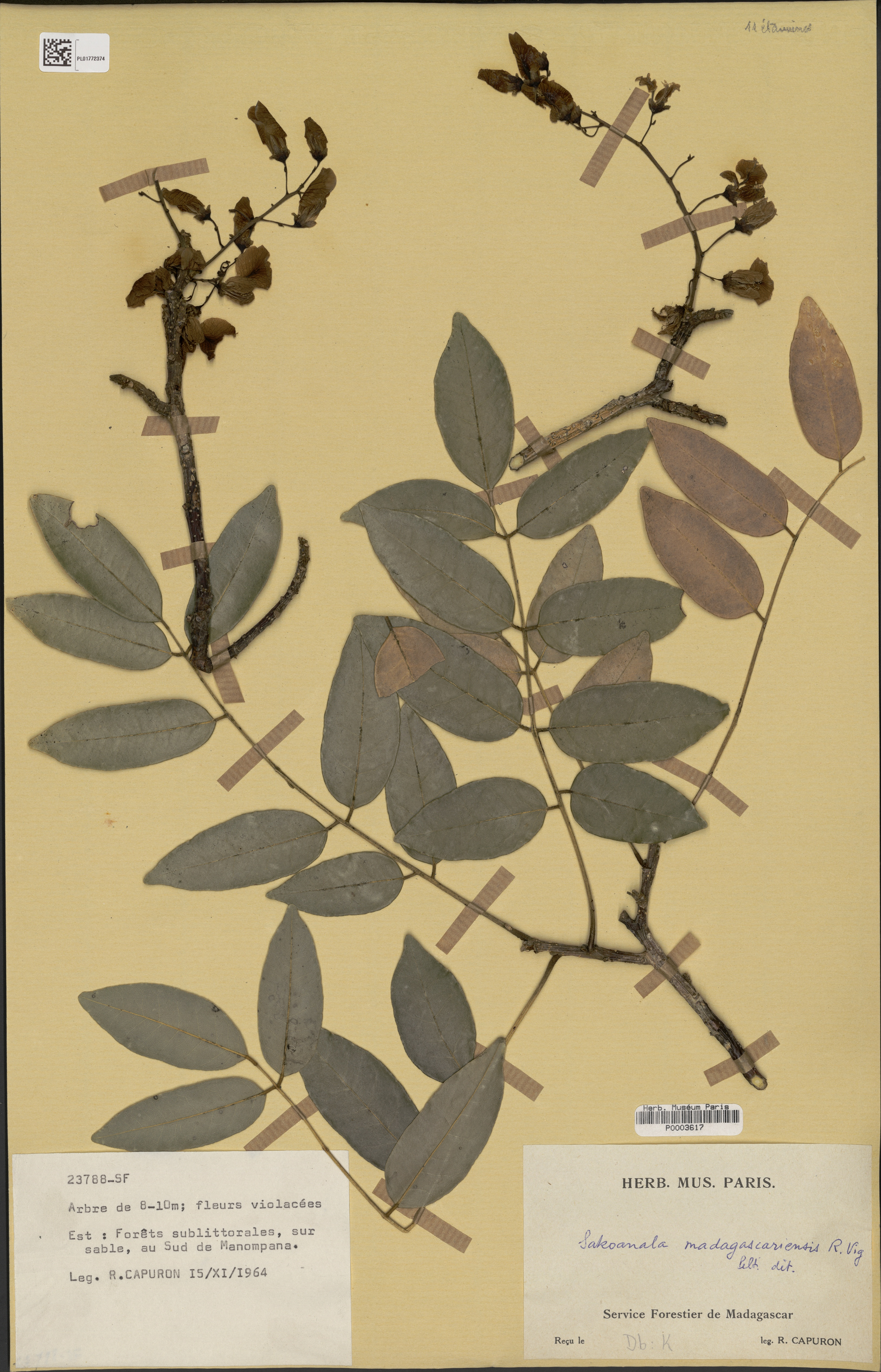

Conservation status
- Endangered (IUCN 3.1)

Scientific classification
- Kingdom: Plantae
- Clade: Tracheophytes
- Clade: Angiosperms
- Clade: Eudicots
- Clade: Rosids
- Order: Fabales
- Family: Fabaceae
- Subfamily: Faboideae
- Genus: Sakoanala
- Species: S. madagascariensis

Binomial name
- Sakoanala madagascariensis R.Vig.

= Sakoanala madagascariensis =

Species of legume

Sakoanala madagascariensis is a species of legume in the family Fabaceae. It is found only in Madagascar.
