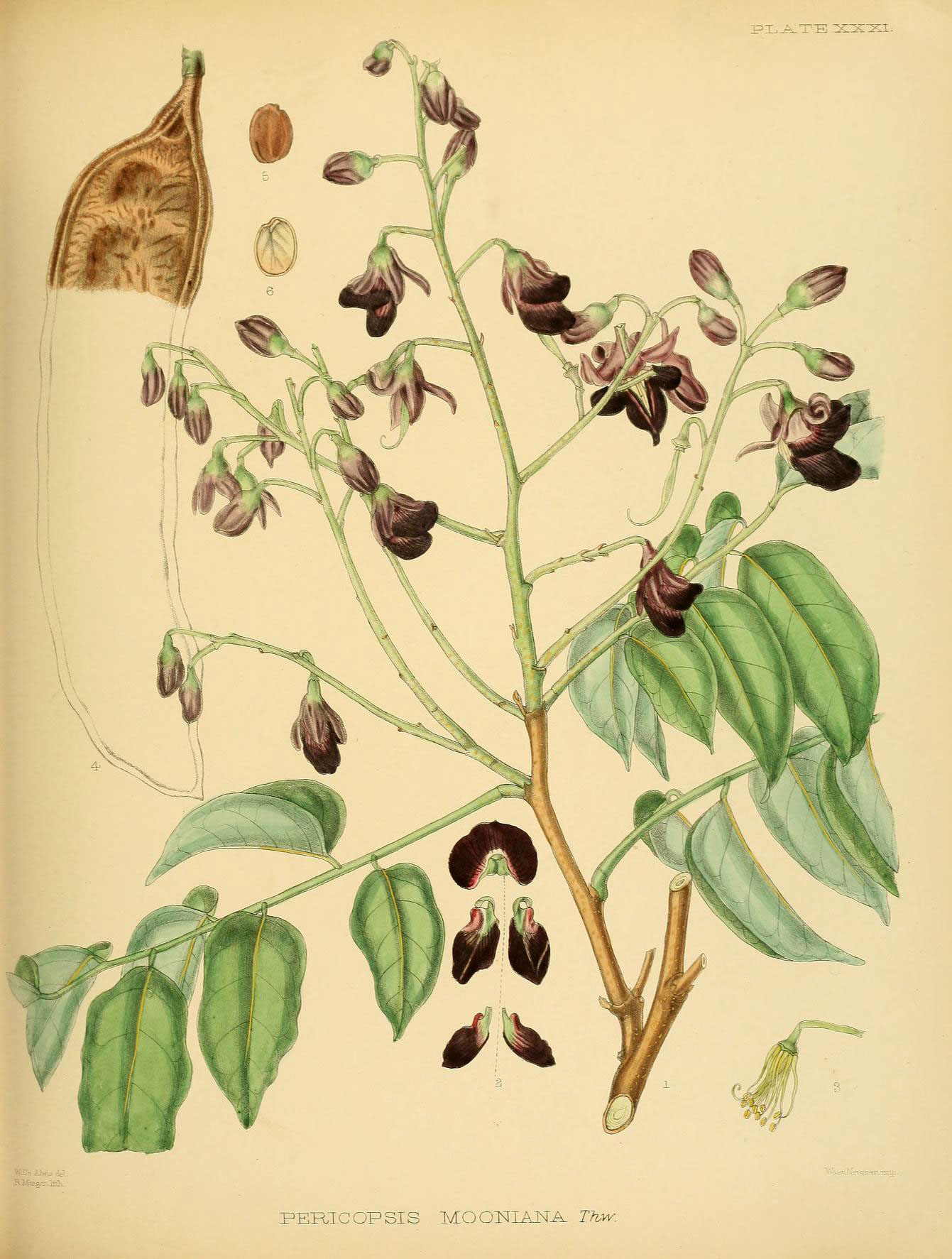

Conservation status
- Vulnerable (IUCN 2.3)

Scientific classification
- Kingdom: Plantae
- Clade: Tracheophytes
- Clade: Angiosperms
- Clade: Eudicots
- Clade: Rosids
- Order: Fabales
- Family: Fabaceae
- Subfamily: Faboideae
- Genus: Pericopsis
- Species: P. mooniana

Binomial name
- Pericopsis mooniana (Thw.) Thw.

Synonyms
- Albergia lanceolaria Moon; Dalbergia mooniana Thwaites; Derris ponapensis Hosok.; Ormosia villamilii Merr.; Pericopsis ponapensis (Hosok.) Hosok.

= Pericopsis mooniana =

Species of legume

Pericopsis mooniana, the nandu wood or nedun tree, is a species of legume in the family Fabaceae. It is found in Indonesia, Malaysia, Micronesia, Palau, Papua New Guinea, the Philippines, and Sri Lanka. It is threatened by habitat loss.
