= Panurea =

Scientific classification
- Kingdom: Plantae
- Clade: Tracheophytes
- Clade: Angiosperms
- Clade: Eudicots
- Clade: Rosids
- Order: Fabales
- Family: Fabaceae
- Subfamily: Faboideae
- Tribe: Ormosieae
- Genus: Panurea; Spruce ex Benth. & Hook. f. (1865)

Species
- Panurea bowdichioides C.H.Stirt. ex Povydysh & M.Yu.Gontsch.; Panurea longifolia Spruce ex Benth.

Genus of legumes

Panurea is a genus of flowering plants in the legume family, Fabaceae. It includes two species of trees native to Colombia and northern Brazil. They grow in the lowland tropical Amazon rainforest on white sand. The genus belongs to tribe Ormosieae in subfamily Faboideae.
