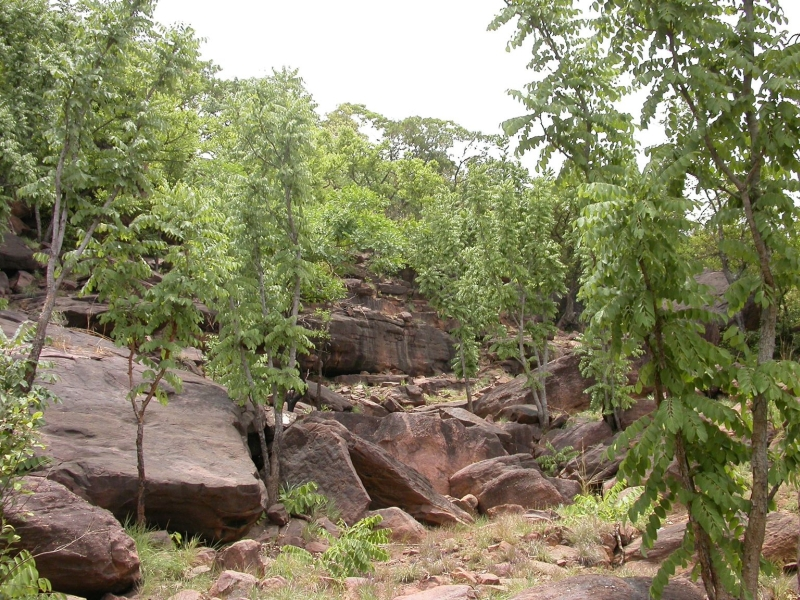

Scientific classification
- Kingdom: Plantae
- Clade: Tracheophytes
- Clade: Angiosperms
- Clade: Eudicots
- Clade: Rosids
- Order: Fabales
- Family: Fabaceae
- Subfamily: Faboideae
- Genus: Pericopsis
- Species: P. laxiflora

Binomial name
- Pericopsis laxiflora (Benth. ex Baker) Meeuwen

= Pericopsis laxiflora =

Species of plant

Pericopsis laxiflora is a woody deciduous shrub or tree within the Fabaceae family. Sold commercially as satin wood, it is known in some regions as Kulu Kulu, among the Hausa speaking people, it is called Makarfo, the Yorubas call it Ayan and the Igbos call it Abua-Ocha. It is one of three species in the genus Pericopsis genus that occurs in Africa.

The species contains the alkaloids: N-methylcytisine, ammodendrine, and choline.

== Description ==
A tree or shrub, common growth reaches between 9 and 12 meters tall but occasionally grows up to 2 meters tall as a shrub. Trunk usually twisted, rarely straight and with twisted branches, bark is smooth, grey to beige in color while stem is pubescent. Leaves, alternate arrangement, 4–6 pairs, upper surface imparipinate, shiny and lower surface glabrous. Leaf-blade, lanceolate to ovate in outline, 3–7 cm long and 2.5–5 cm wide, acuminate apex with cuneate base. Petiole, 15–20 cm long.

== Distribution ==
Occurs widely in the Savannah and dry forest regions of West Africa.

== Uses ==
Root, bark, leaf decoctions are used to treat stomach ailments in Côte d'Ivoire, while in Guinea, plant extracts are used to treat shigellosis. In Ghana, it is used as a topical treatment for body pain and among some locals in Cameroon, the plant extracts are used by diabetes patients.
