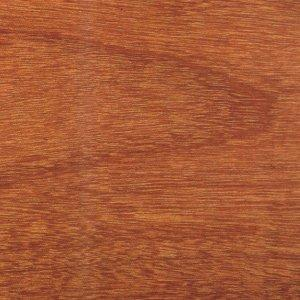
- Afrormosia veneer sample

Conservation status
- Endangered (IUCN 3.1)

Scientific classification
- Kingdom: Plantae
- Clade: Tracheophytes
- Clade: Angiosperms
- Clade: Eudicots
- Clade: Rosids
- Order: Fabales
- Family: Fabaceae
- Subfamily: Faboideae
- Genus: Pericopsis
- Species: P. elata

Binomial name
- Pericopsis elata (Harms) van Meeuwen

Synonyms
- Afrormosia elata Harms

= Pericopsis elata =

Species of flowering plant

Pericopsis elata is a species of flowering plant in the family Fabaceae and is known by the common names African teak, afrormosia, kokrodua and assamela.

== Description ==
The species grows to 30-45m tall with a trunk of 1–1.8m in diameter. Annual diameter increases between unlogged and logged areas have been shown to be similar. It is a deciduous species that flowers at the end of the main dry season. The minimum trunk diameter for reproduction is given as 32 cm, while that for effective flowering is 37 cm. The fruit take 7 months to mature.

Despite its relatively small diameter, trees can live to be over 400 years old.

== Range ==
The species is native to moist, semi-deciduous forests in Cameroon, Republic of the Congo, DRC, Ivory Coast, Ghana, and Nigeria. Up until the mid 20th century, the tree was commonly found in its native range. However, after its wood was introduced to world markets in 1948, its range quickly diminished. It can no longer be found in the Ivory Coast and only small pockets remain in other countries besides the DRC where it is still threatened.

== Ecology ==
The seed pods are eaten by birds and monkeys while the seeds themselves provide food to beetles. Flowers provide homes for butterflies. The crowns of the trees provide shade and shelter to many understory plant species. Its fire resistant bark and nitrogen fixing roots make it an important pioneer species for areas damaged by fires.

== Uses ==
The tree produces hardwood timber of high commercial value due to its texture, strength, density and durability. It is used in the manufacture of boats, veneer, and furniture.

== Stocks and extraction ==
The DRC has the world's largest remaining stocks of afrormosia, which are largely confined to the Équateur and Orientale Provinces.

Illegal logging and habitat loss pose a realistic threat to the afrormosia, which ranks among the most valued hard tropical timber species. Following decades of extraction in the 20th and 21st century, it is ranked CITES Appendix II. This implies that it is subject to trade regulation because it is recognised that unregulated trade puts the species at risk of extinction. The factors that control its population dynamics are however imperfectly known. With a minimum logging diameter of 90 cm, full recovery is expected over a 30-year period. Selective logging of 12% of seed trees has been shown to have little influence on its survival. Sustainability is believed to be best achieved by purposeful actions to ensure regeneration after logging.
