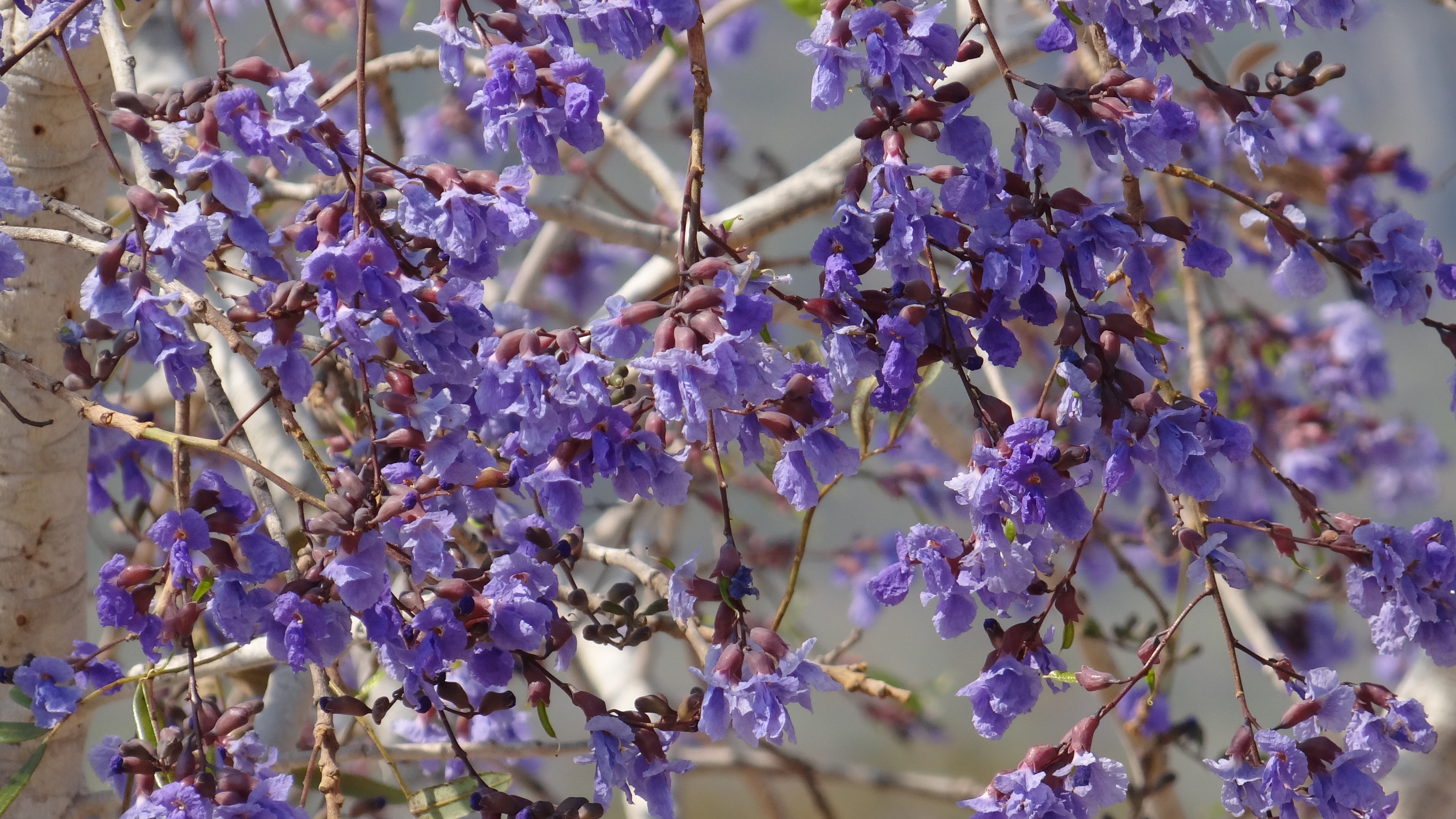
- Bowdichia virgilioides

Scientific classification
- Kingdom: Plantae
- Clade: Tracheophytes
- Clade: Angiosperms
- Clade: Eudicots
- Clade: Rosids
- Order: Fabales
- Family: Fabaceae
- Subfamily: Faboideae
- Tribe: Leptolobieae
- Genus: Bowdichia; Kunth (1824)

Species
- Bowdichia nitida Spruce ex Benth.; Bowdichia virgilioides Kunth

Synonyms
- Cebipira Juss. ex Kuntze (1903); Sebipira Mart. (1828)

= Bowdichia =

Genus of legumes

Bowdichia is a genus of flowering plants in the legume family, Fabaceae. It belongs to the subfamily Faboideae. The genus includes two species native to tropical South America and Costa Rica.

- Bowdichia nitida Spruce ex Benth. – northern Brazil and northern Bolivia
- Bowdichia virgilioides Kunth – Costa Rica to Bolivia, Paraguay, and southern Brazil
