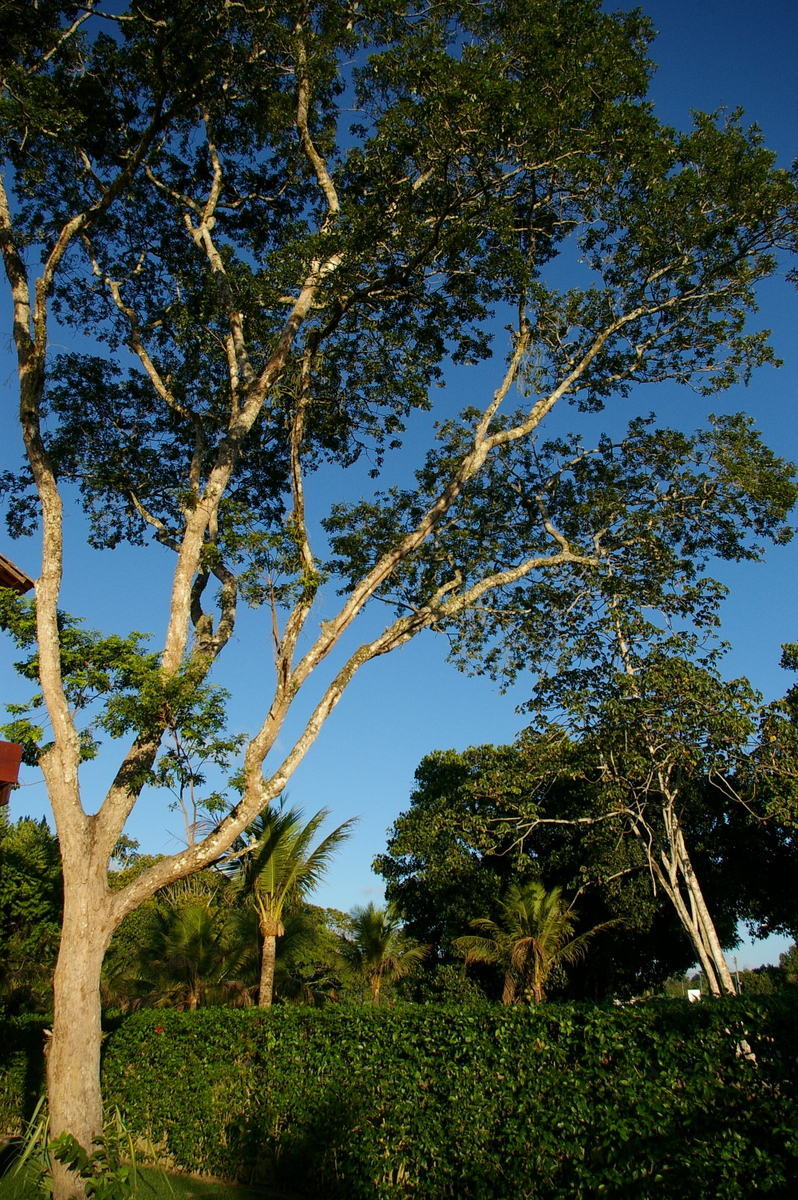
- An unidentified species of Diplotropis.

Scientific classification
- Kingdom: Plantae
- Clade: Embryophytes
- Clade: Tracheophytes
- Clade: Angiosperms
- Clade: Eudicots
- Clade: Rosids
- Order: Fabales
- Family: Fabaceae
- Subfamily: Faboideae
- Tribe: Leptolobieae
- Genus: Diplotropis; Benth.

Type species
- Diplotropis martiusii

Species
- Diplotropis brasiliensis (Tul.) Benth.; Diplotropis ferruginea Benth.; Diplotropis incexis Rizzini & A.Mattos; Diplotropis martiusii Benth.; Diplotropis peruviana J.F.Macbr.; Diplotropis purpurea (Rich.) Amshoff; Diplotropis rigidocarpa H.C.Lima; Diplotropis rodriguesii H.C.Lima; Diplotropis strigulosa R.S.Cowan; Diplotropis triloba Gleason

Synonyms
- Dibrachion Tul. (1843)

= Diplotropis =

Genus of legumes

Diplotropis is a genus of trees (family Fabaceae). It includes ten species native to northern South America, ranging from Colombia and Venezuela to Bolivia and west-central and southeastern Brazil.
