= Clathrotropis =

Scientific classification
- Kingdom: Plantae
- Clade: Embryophytes
- Clade: Tracheophytes
- Clade: Spermatophytes
- Clade: Angiosperms
- Clade: Eudicots
- Clade: Rosids
- Order: Fabales
- Family: Fabaceae
- Subfamily: Faboideae
- Tribe: Ormosieae
- Genus: Clathrotropis (Benth.) Harms (1901)

Species
- 6–8; see text.

Genus of legumes

Clathrotropis is a genus of flowering plants in the family Fabaceae. It includes 7 species native to northern South America, ranging from Peru to Colombia, Venezuela, the Guianas, and northern Brazil. The genus belongs to subfamily Faboideae.

== Species ==
Clathrotropis comprises the following species:

- Clathrotropis brachypetala (Tul.) Kleinhoonte
- Clathrotropis brunnea Amshoff
- Clathrotropis glaucophylla R.S.Cowan
- Clathrotropis macrocarpa Ducke
- Clathrotropis nitida (Benth.) Harms
- Clathrotropis paradoxa Sandwith
- Clathrotropis rosea M.Yu.Gontsch. & Povydysh
