= Acosmium =

Scientific classification
- Kingdom: Plantae
- Clade: Tracheophytes
- Clade: Angiosperms
- Clade: Eudicots
- Clade: Rosids
- Order: Fabales
- Family: Fabaceae
- Subfamily: Faboideae
- Tribe: Dalbergieae
- Genus: Acosmium; Schott

Species
- Acosmium cardenasii H.S. Irwin & Arroyo; Acosmium diffusissimum (Mohlenbr.) Yakovlev; Acosmium lentiscifolium Schott.
- Key: Range of Acosmium cardenasii. Range of Acosmium lentiscifolium. Range of Acosmium diffusissimum.

Genus of legumes

Acosmium is a South America genus of flowering plants in the family Fabaceae. Three species are currently recognized. Most Acosmium species have been recently transferred to Leptolobium and one species to the South American Guianodendron while the genus Acosmium itself has been transferred from the tribe Sophoreae to the tribe Dalbergieae in a monophyletic clade informally known as the Pterocarpus clade.
