= Haplormosia =

Conservation status
- Vulnerable (IUCN 2.3)

Scientific classification
- Kingdom: Plantae
- Clade: Tracheophytes
- Clade: Angiosperms
- Clade: Eudicots
- Clade: Rosids
- Order: Fabales
- Family: Fabaceae
- Subfamily: Faboideae
- Tribe: Ormosieae
- Genus: Haplormosia; Harms
- Species: H. monophylla

Binomial name
- Haplormosia monophylla (Harms) Harms

Genus of legumes

Haplormosia is a monotypic genus of legumes in the family Fabaceae. Its only species is Haplormosia monophylla, commonly known as Liberian black gum, native to Cameroon, Ivory Coast, Liberia, Nigeria, and Sierra Leone. It is threatened by habitat loss.
