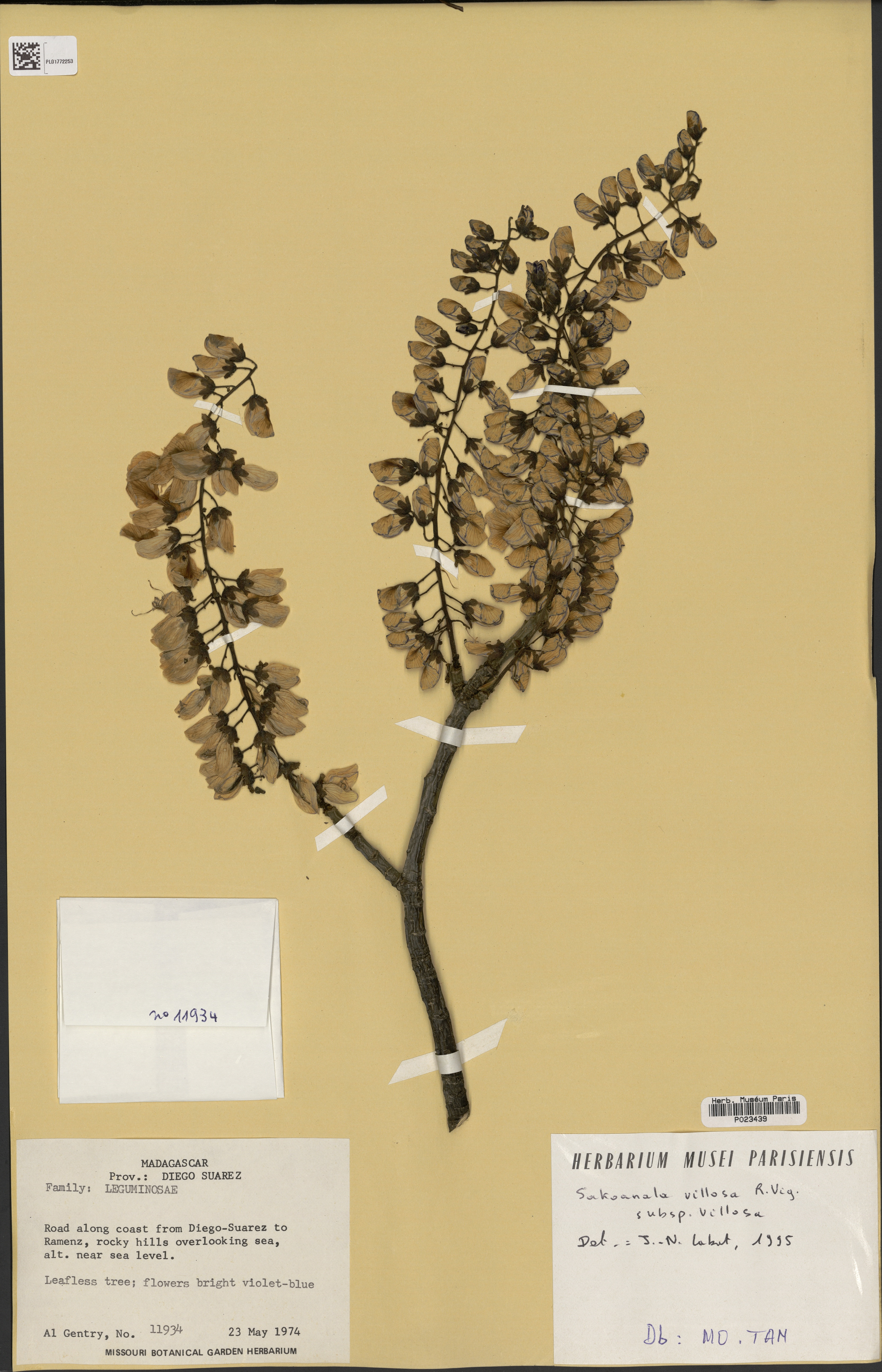

Scientific classification
- Kingdom: Plantae
- Clade: Tracheophytes
- Clade: Angiosperms
- Clade: Eudicots
- Clade: Rosids
- Order: Fabales
- Family: Fabaceae
- Subfamily: Faboideae
- Tribe: Sophoreae
- Genus: Sakoanala; R.Vig.

Species
- 2; see text.

= Sakoanala =

Genus of legumes

Sakoanala is a genus of legume in the family Fabaceae. It contains two species which are endemic to Madagascar.

== Species ==
Sakoanala comprises the following species:

- Sakoanala madagascariensis R. Vig.
- Sakoanala villosa R. Vig.
