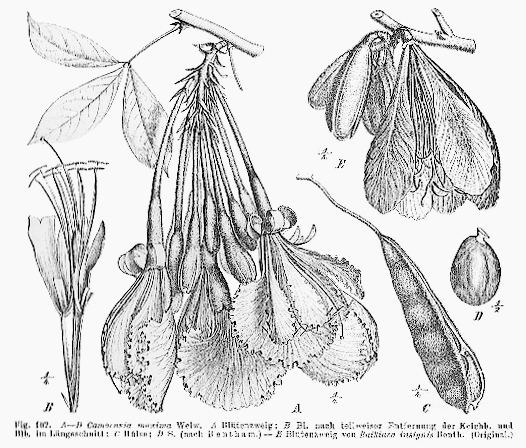
- Camoensia scandens: illustrations A-D

Scientific classification
- Kingdom: Plantae
- Clade: Tracheophytes
- Clade: Angiosperms
- Clade: Eudicots
- Clade: Rosids
- Order: Fabales
- Family: Fabaceae
- Subfamily: Faboideae
- Clade: Meso-Papilionoideae
- Clade: Genistoids
- Tribe: Camoensieae (Yakovlev 1972) Cardoso et al. 2013.
- Genus: Camoensia; Welw. ex Benth. & Hook. f.

Species
- Camoensia brevicalyx Benth.; Camoensia scandens (Welw.) J.B. Gillett

Synonyms
- Giganthemum Welw.

= Camoensia (plant) =

Genus of legumes

Camoensia is a genus of 2 species of lianas in the family Fabaceae, subfamily Faboideae, native to the Gulf of Guinea, Africa. C. scandens is cultivated as an ornamental plant; it has one of the largest leguminous flowers, up to 20 cm across. The genus has classically been assigned to the tribe Sophoreae, but was recently assigned to its own monophyletic tribe, Camoensieae, on the basis of molecular phylogenetic evidence. Species of Camoensia are known to produce quinolizidine alkaloids, consistent with their placement in the genistoid clade.

== Gallery ==
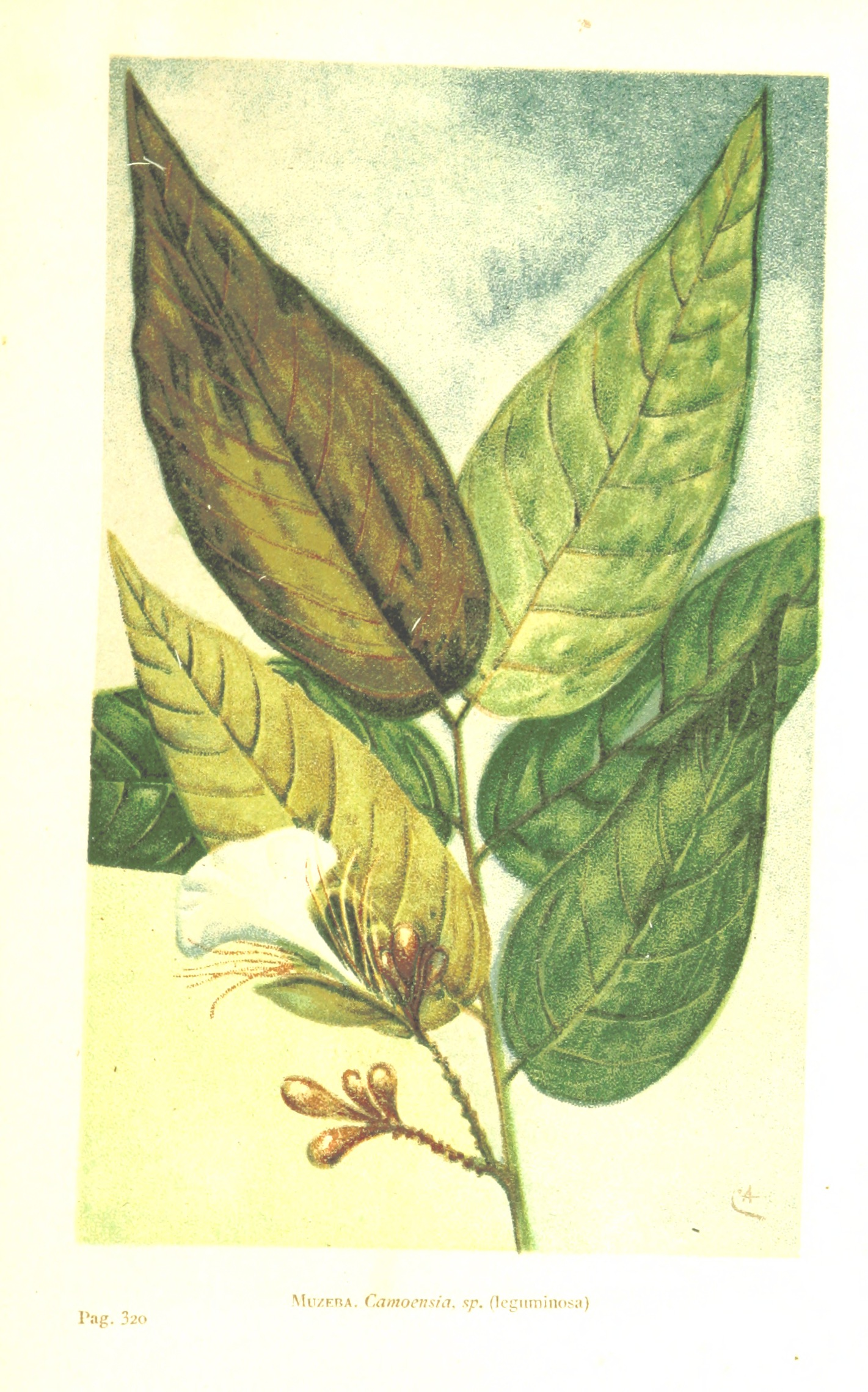
Colour plate depicting Camoensia sp.

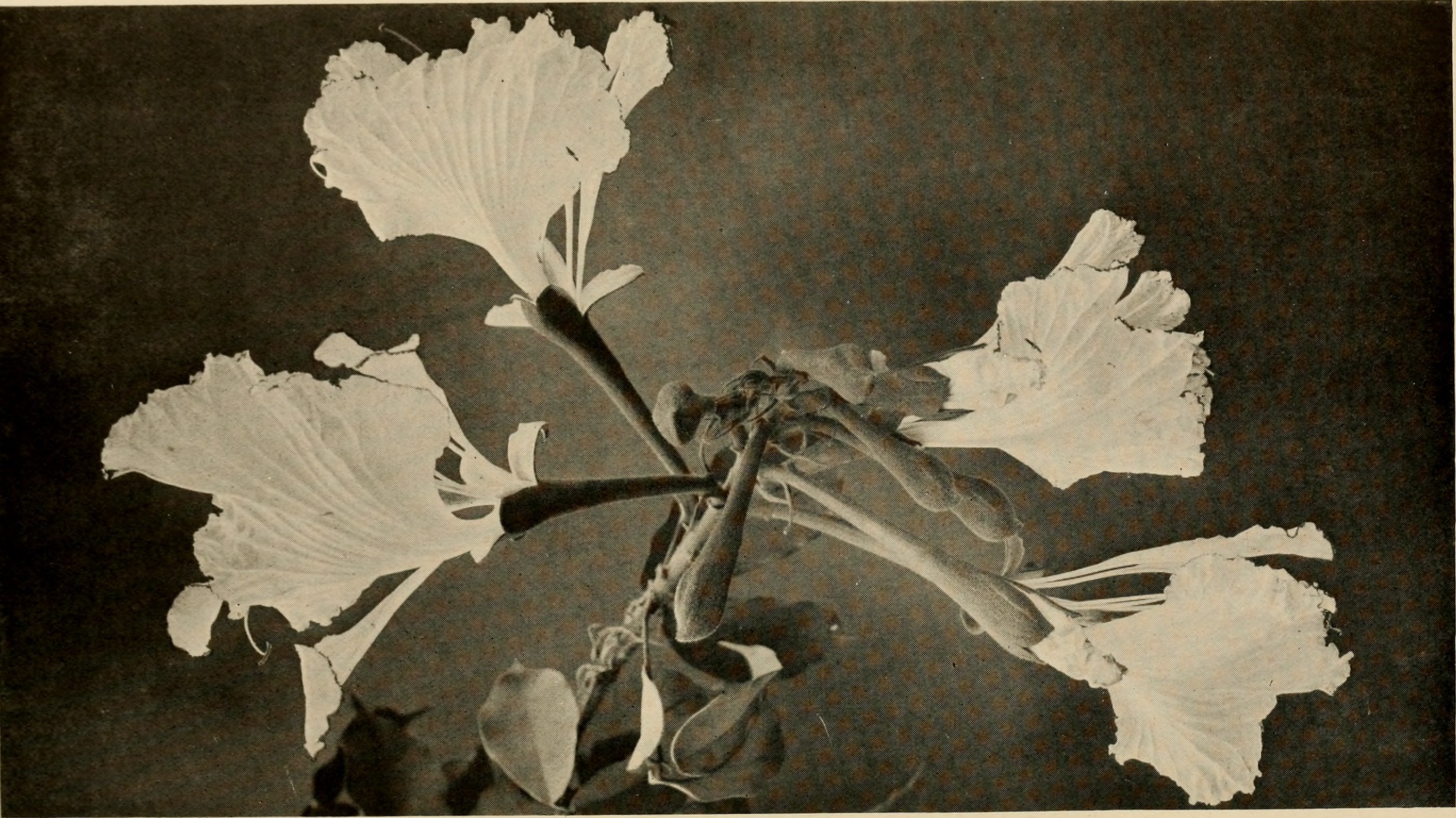
Black and white image of C. scandens (syn. C. maxima)

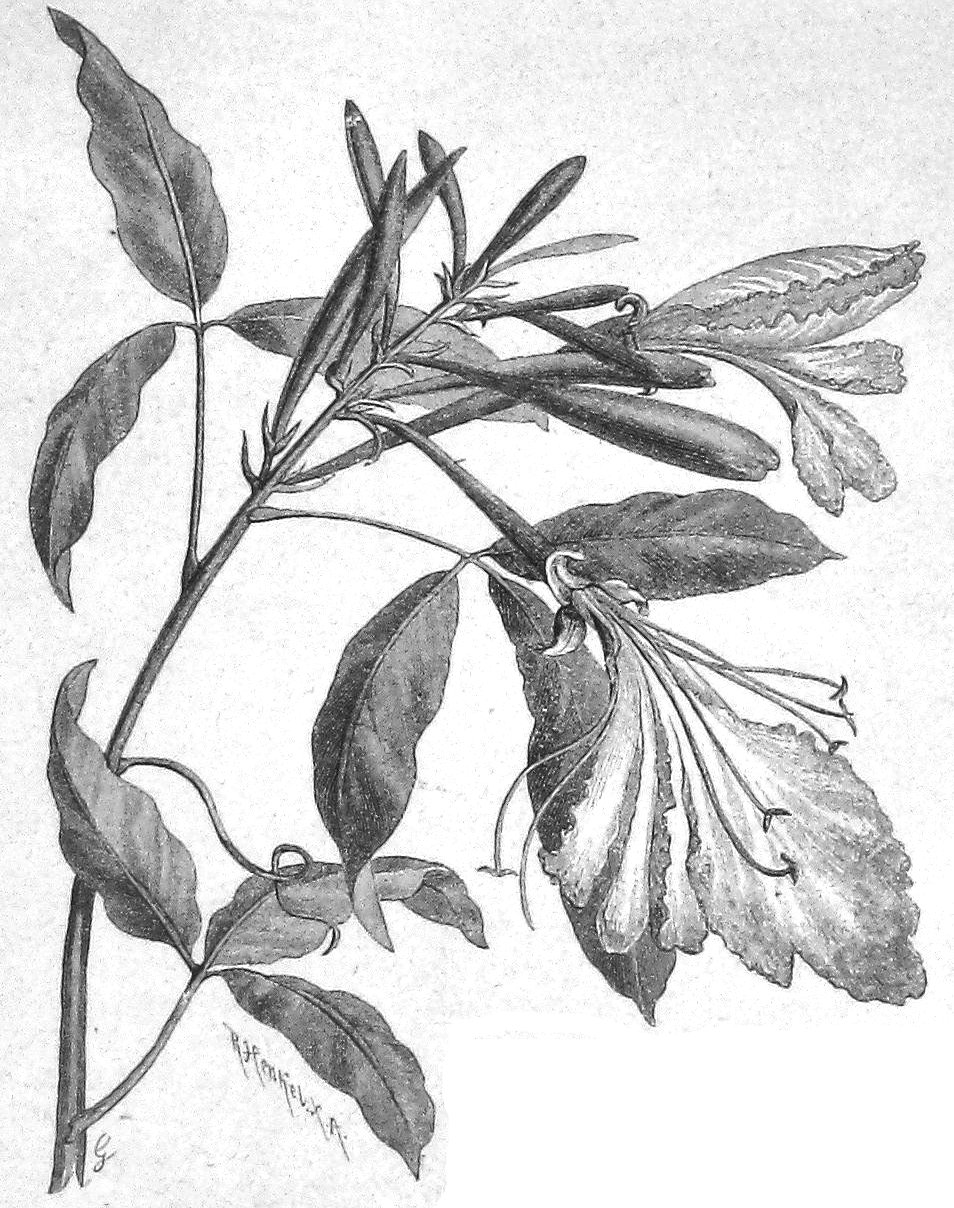
Botanical line drawing from Die Gartenlaube (1883)
