= Orphanodendron =

Scientific classification
- Kingdom: Plantae
- Clade: Tracheophytes
- Clade: Angiosperms
- Clade: Eudicots
- Clade: Rosids
- Order: Fabales
- Family: Fabaceae
- Subfamily: Faboideae
- Genus: Orphanodendron; Barneby & J.W.Grimes (1990)

Species
- Orphanodendron bernalii Barneby & J.W.Grimes; Orphanodendron grandiflorum C.Cast. & G.P.Lewis

Genus of legumes

Orphanodendron is a genus of legume in the legume family, Fabaceae. It includes two species of trees native to Colombia, which grow in tropical lowland forest. The genus is in subfamily Faboideae.

== Species ==
Orphanodendron comprises the following species:

- Orphanodendron bernalii Barneby & J.W.Grimes – Colombia (Antioquia)
- Orphanodendron grandiflorum C.Cast. & G.P.Lewis – Colombia (Boyacá and Santander)
