= Spirotropis longifolia =

Scientific classification
- Kingdom: Plantae
- Clade: Tracheophytes
- Clade: Angiosperms
- Clade: Eudicots
- Clade: Rosids
- Order: Fabales
- Family: Fabaceae
- Subfamily: Faboideae
- Genus: Spirotropis; Tul. (1844)
- Species: S. longifolia

Binomial name
- Spirotropis longifolia (DC.) Baill. (1870)

Synonyms
- Dipteryx phaeophylla Steyerm. (1984); Spirotropis candollei Tul. (1844), nom. superfl.; Swartzia longifolia DC. (1826); Tounatea longifolia (DC.) Kuntze (1891)

Genus of legumes

Spirotropis longifolia is a species of flowering plant in the legume family, Fabaceae. It is a tree native to Venezuela, Suriname, and French Guiana in northern South America. It is the sole species in genus Spirotropis. It belongs to subfamily Faboideae.

Symbiotic Relationships The tree forms symbiotic relationships with Bradyrhizobium bacteria and arbuscular mycorrhizal fungi, which contribute to its dominance in these ecosystems and enhance its ability to thrive in nutrient-poor soils.

Phytochemistry Phytochemical analysis of Spirotropis longifolia roots has led to the isolation of unique isoflavonoids that exhibit antifungal activity, which could be used for medicinal applications.
