= Decorsea dinteri =

Conservation status
- Least Concern (IUCN 3.1)

Scientific classification
- Kingdom: Plantae
- Clade: Tracheophytes
- Clade: Angiosperms
- Clade: Eudicots
- Clade: Rosids
- Order: Fabales
- Family: Fabaceae
- Subfamily: Faboideae
- Genus: Decorsea
- Species: D. dinteri

Binomial name
- Decorsea dinteri (Harms) Verdc.

Species of legume

Decorsea dinteri is a species of legume in the family Fabaceae. It is found only in Namibia. Its natural habitat is freshwater marshes.
