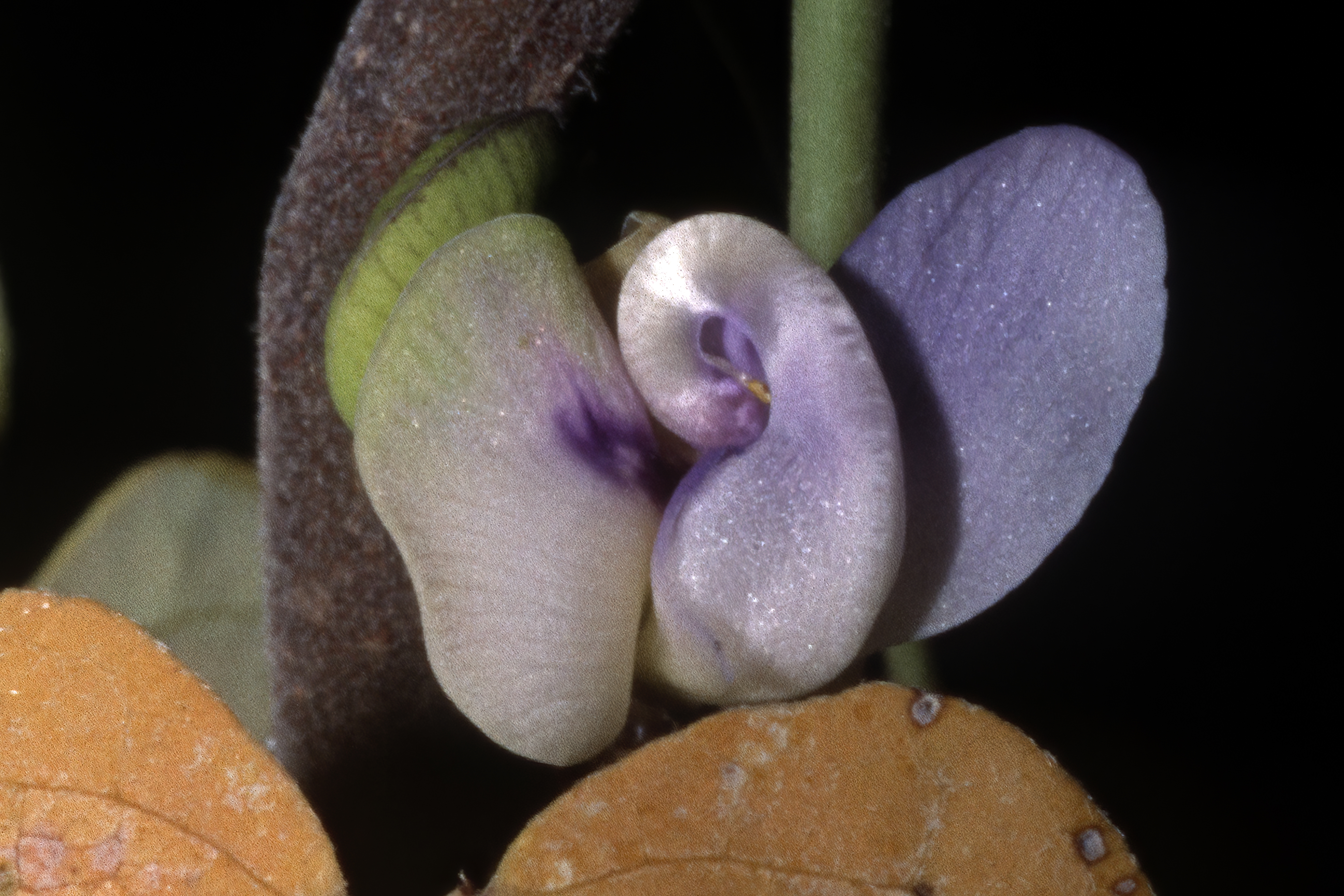
- Decorsea schlechteri

Scientific classification
- Kingdom: Plantae
- Clade: Tracheophytes
- Clade: Angiosperms
- Clade: Eudicots
- Clade: Rosids
- Order: Fabales
- Family: Fabaceae
- Subfamily: Faboideae
- Tribe: Phaseoleae
- Genus: Decorsea; R.Vig.

Species
- Decorsea dinteri (Harms) Verdc.; Decorsea galpinii (Burtt Davy) Verdc.; Decorsea grandidieri (Baill.) R.Vig. ex A.G.Peltier; Decorsea livida R.Vig.; Decorsea meridionalis (R.Vig.) Du Puy & Labat; Decorsea schlechteri (Harms) Verdc.

= Decorsea =

Genus of legumes

Decorsea is a genus of legume in the family Fabaceae. It comprises six species indigenous to East and Southern Africa, spanning from Tanzania to Namibia and South Africa, including Madagascar.

== Species ==
As of August 2023, Plants of the World Online accepted the following species:

- Decorsea dinteri (Harms) Verdc.
- Decorsea galpinii (Burtt Davy) Verdc.
- Decorsea grandidieri (Baill.) R.Vig. ex A.G.Peltier
- Decorsea livida R.Vig.
- Decorsea meridionalis (R.Vig.) Du Puy & Labat
- Decorsea schlechteri (Harms) Verdc.
