= Dolichopsis monticola =

Scientific classification
- Kingdom: Plantae
- Clade: Tracheophytes
- Clade: Angiosperms
- Clade: Eudicots
- Clade: Rosids
- Order: Fabales
- Family: Fabaceae
- Subfamily: Faboideae
- Genus: Dolichopsis
- Species: D. monticola

Binomial name
- Dolichopsis monticola (Mart. ex Benth.) A. Delgado & G. P. Lewis (1991)

Synonyms
- Dolichos monticola Mart. ex Benth. (1859); Oryxis monticola (Mart. ex Benth.) A.Delgado & G.P.Lewis (1997)

Genus of legumes

Dolichopsis monticola is a species of flowering plant in the legume family, Fabaceae. It is a climber endemic to Minas Gerais state in southeastern Brazil.
