= List of Fabaceae genera =

This is a list of genera in the plant family Fabaceae, or Leguminosae, commonly known as the legume, pea, or bean family, are a large and economically important family of flowering plants with 807 genera and nearly 20,000 known species.

== A ==
- Abarema Pittier
- Abrus Adans.
- Acacia Mill.
- Acaciella Britton & Rose
- Acmispon Raf.
- Acosmium Schott
- Acrocarpus Wight & Arn.
- Adenanthera L.
- Adenocarpus DC.
- Adenodolichos Harms
- Adenolobus (Harv. ex Benth. & Hook.f.) Torre & Hillc.
- Adenopodia C.Presl
- Adesmia DC.
- Adinobotrys Dunn
- Aenictophyton A.T.Lee
- Aeschynomene L.
- Afgekia Craib
- Afroamphica H.Ohashi & K.Ohashi
- Afrocalliandra E.R.Souza & L.P.Queiroz – synonym of Calliandra
- Afzelia Sm.
- Aganope Miq.
- Airyantha Brummitt
- Akschindlium H.Ohashi
- Alantsilodendron Villiers
- Albizia Durazz.
- Aldina Endl.
- Alexa Moq.
- Alhagi Tourn. ex Gagnebin
- Alistilus N.E.Br.
- Almaleea Crisp & P.H.Weston
- Alysicarpus Desv.
- Amblygonocarpus Harms
- Amburana Schwacke & Taubert
- Amherstia Wall.
- Amicia Kunth
- Ammodendron Fisch. ex DC.
- Ammopiptanthus S.H.Cheng
- Amorpha L.
- Amphicarpaea Elliott ex Nutt.
- Amphimas Pierre ex Harms
- Amphiodon Huber
- Amphithalea Eckl. & Zeyh.
- Anadenanthera Speg.
- Anagyris L.
- Anarthrophyllum Benth.
- Ancistrotropis A.Delgado
- Andira Lam.
- Androcalymma Dwyer
- Angylocalyx Taub.
- Annea Mackinder & Wieringa
- Anonychium Schweinf.
- Antheroporum Gagnep.
- Anthonotha P.Beauv.
- Anthyllis L.
- Antopetitia A.Rich.
- Aotus Sm.
- Aphanocalyx Oliver
- Aphyllodium (DC.) Gagnep.
- Apios Fabr.
- Apoplanesia C.Presl
- Apuleia Mart.
- Apurimacia Harms
- Arachis L.
- Arapatiella Rizzini & A.Mattos
- Archidendron F.Muell.
- Archidendropsis I.C.Nielsen
- Arcoa Urb.
- Argyrocytisus (Maire) Raynaud
- Argyrolobium Eckl. & Zeyh.
- Arquita E. Gagnon, G. P. Lewis & C. E. Hughes
- Arthroclianthus Baill.
- Aspalathus L.
- Astragalus L.
- Ateleia (DC.) D.Dietr.
- Aubrevillea Pellegr.
- Augouardia Pellegr.
- Austrocallerya J.Compton & Schrire
- Austrodolichos Verdc.
- Austrosteenisia R.Geesink

== B ==
- Baikiaea Benth.
- Balsamocarpon Clos
- Baphia Afzel. ex G.Lodd.
- Baphiastrum Harms
- Baphiopsis Benth. ex Baker
- Baptisia Vent.
- Barbieria DC.
- Barklya F.Muell.
- Barnebydendron J.H.Kirkbr.
- Batesia Spruce ex Benth. & Hook.f.
- Baudouinia Baill.
- Bauhinia Plum ex L.
- Behaimia Griseb.
- Berlinia Sol. ex Hook.f. & Benth.
- Betencourtia A.St.-Hil.
- Biancaea Tod.
- Bikinia Wieringa
- Bionia Mart. ex Benth.
- Biserrula L.
- Bituminaria Heist. ex Fabr.
- Blanchetiodendron Barneby & J.W.Grimes
- Bobgunnia J.H.Kirkbr. & Wiersema
- Bocoa Aubl.
- Boliviadendron E.R.Souza & C.E.Hughes
- Bolusafra Kuntze
- Bolusanthus Harms
- Bolusia Benth.
- Bossiaea Vent.
- Bouffordia H.Ohashi & K.Ohashi
- Bowdichia Kunth
- Bowringia Champ. ex Benth.
- Brachycylix (Harms) R.S.Cowan
- Brachypterum (Wight & Arn.) Benth.
- Brachystegia Benth.
- Bracteolaria Hochst.
- Brandzeia Baill.
- Brenierea Humbert
- Brodriguesia R.S.Cowan
- Brongniartia Kunth
- Brownea Jacq.
- Browneopsis Huber
- Brya P.Browne
- Bryaspis P.A.Duvign.
- Burkea Benth.
- Burkilliodendron Sastry
- Bussea Harms
- Butea Roxb. ex Willd.

== C ==
- Cadia Forssk.
- Caesalpinia Plum ex L.
- Caetangil L.P.Queiroz
- Cajanus Adans.
- Calicotome Link
- Callerya Endl.
- Calliandra Benth.
- Calliandropsis H.M.Hern. & Guinet
- Callistachys Vent.
- Calobota Eckl. & Zeyh.
- Calophaca Fisch.
- Calopogonium Desv.
- Calpocalyx Harms
- Calpurnia E.Mey.
- Camoensia Welw. ex Benth.
- Campsiandra Benth.
- Camptosema Hook. & Arn.
- Campylotropis Bunge
- Canavalia DC.
- Candolleodendron R.S.Cowan
- Caragana Lam.
- Carmichaelia R.Br.
- Carrissoa Baker f.
- Cascaronia Griseb.
- Cassia L.
- Castanospermum A.Cunn. ex Mudie
- Cathormion (Benth.) Hassk.
- Cedrelinga Ducke
- Cenostigma Tul.
- Centrolobium Mart. ex Benth.
- Cenostigma Tul.
- Centrosema (DC.) Benth.
- Ceratonia L.
- Cercis L.
- Cerradicola L.P.Queiroz
- Chadsia Bojer
- Chamaecrista Moench
- Chamaecytisus Link
- Chapmannia Torr. & A.Gray
- Cheniella R.Clark & Mackinder
- Chesneya Lindl. ex Endl.
- Chidlowia Hoyle
- Chloroleucon (Benth.) Record
- Chorizema Labill.
- Christia Moench
- Cicer L.
- Cladrastis Raf.
- Clathrotropis (Benth.) Harms
- Cleobulia Mart. ex Benth.
- Clianthus Sol. ex Lindl.
- Clitoria L.
- Clitoriopsis R.Wilczek
- Cochlianthus Benth.
- Cochliasanthus Trew
- Codariocalyx Hassk.
- Cojoba Britton & Rose
- Collaea DC.
- Cologania Kunth
- Colophospermum J. Kirk ex J. Léonard
- Colutea L.
- Colvillea Bojer ex Hook.
- Condylostylis Piper
- Conzattia Rose
- Copaifera L.
- Cordeauxia Hemsl.
- Cordyla Lour.
- Corethrodendron Fisch. & Basiner
- Coronilla L.
- Coulteria (Kunth) E. Gagnon, Sotuyo & G. P. Lewis
- Coursetia DC.
- Craibia Harms & Dunn
- Cranocarpus Benth.
- Craspedolobium Harms
- Cratylia Mart. ex Benth.
- Cristonia J.H.Ross
- Crotalaria L.
- Cruddasia Prain
- Crudia Schreb.
- Cryptosepalum Benth.
- Ctenodon Baill.
- Cullen Medik.
- Cyamopsis DC.
- Cyathostegia (Benth.) Schery
- Cyclocarpa Afzel. ex Urb.
- Cyclolobium Benth.
- Cyclopia Vent.
- Cylicodiscus Harms
- Cymbosema Benth.
- Cynometra L.
- Cytisophyllum O.Lang.
- Cytisopsis Jaub. & Spach
- Cytisus Desf.

== D ==
- Dahlstedtia Malme
- Dalbergia L.f.
- Dalbergiella Baker f.
- Dalea L.
- Dalhousiea Graham ex Benth.
- Daniellia Benn.
- Daprainia H.Ohashi & K.Ohashi
- Daviesia Sm.
- Decorsea R.Vig.
- Deguelia Aubl.
- Delgadoana U.B.Deshmukh, M.B.Shende, E.S.Reddy & Mungole
- Delonix Raf.
- Dendrolobium (Wight & Arn.) Benth.
- Denisophytum R. Vig.
- Dermatophyllum Scheele
- Derris Lour.
- Desmanthus Willd.
- Desmodiastrum (Prain) A.Pramanik & Thoth.
- Desmodiopsis (Schindl.) H.Ohashi & K.Ohashi
- Desmodium Desv.
- Detarium Juss.
- Dewevrea Micheli
- Dialium L.
- Dichilus DC.
- Dichrostachys (A.DC.) Wight & Arn.
- Dicorynia Benth.
- Dicraeopetalum Harms
- Dicymbe Spruce ex Benth. & Hook.f.
- Didelotia Baill.
- Dillwynia Sm.
- Dimorphandra Schott
- Dinizia Ducke
- Dioclea Kunth
- Diphyllarium Gagnep.
- Diphysa Jacq.
- Diplotropis Benth.
- Dipogon Liebm.
- Dipteryx Schreb.
- Diptychandra Tul.
- Discolobium Benth.
- Distemonanthus Benth.
- Disynstemon R.Vig.
- Dolichopsis Hassl.
- Dolichos L.
- Dorycnopsis Boiss.
- Droogmansia De Wild.
- Dumasia DC.
- Dunbaria Wight & Arn.
- Duparquetia Baill.
- Dussia Krug & Urb. ex Taub.
- Dysolobium (Benth.) Prain

== E ==
- Ebenopsis Britton & Rose
- Ebenus L.
- Echinospartum (Spach) Fourr.
- Ecuadendron D.A.Neill
- Eleiotis DC.
- Eligmocarpus Capuron
- Eminia Taub.
- Endertia Steenis & de Wit
- Endosamara R.Geesink
- Englerodendron Harms
- Entada Adans.
- Enterolobium Mart.
- Eperua Aubl.
- Eremosparton Fisch. & C.A.Mey.
- Erichsenia Hemsl.
- Erinacea Tourn. ex Adans.
- Eriosema (DC.) G.Don
- Erophaca Boiss.
- Errazurizia Phil.
- Erythrina L.
- Erythrophleum Afzel. ex G.Don
- Erythrostemon Klotzsch
- Euchilopsis F.Muell.
- Euchilus R.Br.
- Euchlora Eckl. & Zeyh.
- Euchresta Benn.
- Eurypetalum Harms
- Eutaxia R.Br.
- Eversmannia Bunge
- Exostyles Schott
- Eysenhardtia Kunth
- Ezoloba B.-E.van Wyk & Boatwr.

== F ==
- Faidherbia A.Chev.
- Fairchildia Britton & Rose
- Falcataria (I.C.Nielsen) Barneby & J.W.Grimes
- Fiebrigiella Harms
- Fillaeopsis Harms
- Fissicalyx Benth.
- Flemingia Roxb. ex W.T.Aiton
- Fordia Hemsl.

== G ==
- Gabonius Mackinder & Wieringa
- Gagnebina Neck. ex DC.
- Galactia P.Browne
- Galega Tourn. ex L.
- Gastrolobium R.Br.
- Geissaspis Wight & Arn.
- Gelrebia E. Gagnon & G.P.Lewis
- Genista L.
- Genistidium I.M.Johnst.
- Geoffroea Jacq.
- Gigasiphon Drake
- Gilbertiodendron J.Léonard
- Gilletiodendron Vermoesen
- Gleditsia L.
- Gliricidia Kunth
- Glycine Willd.
- Glycyrrhiza Tourn. ex L.
- Glycyrrhizopsis Boiss.
- Gompholobium Sm.
- Goniorrhachis Taub.
- Gonocytisus Spach
- Goodia Salisb.
- Grazielodendron H.C.Lima
- Gretheria Duno & Torke
- Greuteria Amirahm. & Kaz.Osaloo
- Griffonia Baill.
- Grievea R.L.Barrett, Clugston & Orthia
- Grimolobium A.N.Egan, C.H.Stirt. & A.Bello
- Grona Lour.
- Gueldenstaedtia Fisch.
- Guianodendron Sch.Rodr. & A.M.G.Azevedo
- Guibourtia Benn.
- Guilandina L.
- Gwilymia A.G.Lima, Paula-Souza & Scalon
- Gymnocladus Lam.

== H ==
- Haematoxylum L.
- Hammatolobium Fenzl
- Hanslia Schindl.
- Haplormosia Harms
- Harashuteria K.Ohashi & H.Ohashi
- Hardenbergia Benth.
- Hardwickia Roxb.
- Harleyodendron R.S.Cowan
- Harpalyce Moc. & Sessé ex DC.
- Havardia Small
- Haymondia A.N.Egan & B.Pan
- Hebestigma Urb.
- Hedysarum L.
- Hegnera Schindl.
- Helicotropis A.Delgado
- Heliodendron Gill.K.Br. & Bayly
- Hererolandia Gagnon & G.P.Lewis
- Herpyza Sauvalle
- Hesperalbizia Barneby & J.W.Grimes
- Hesperolaburnum Maire
- Hesperothamnus Brandegee
- Heteroflorum M.Sousa
- Heterostemon Desf.
- Hippocrepis L.
- Hoffmannseggia Cav.
- Hoita Rydb.
- Holocalyx Micheli
- Hosackia Douglas ex Benth.
- Hovea R.Br.
- Huangtcia H.Ohashi & K.Ohashi
- Huchimingia Z.Q.Song & Shi J.Li
- Hultholia Gagnon & G.P.Lewis
- Humboldtia Vahl
- Humularia P.A.Duvign.
- Hydrochorea Barneby & J.W.Grimes
- Hylodendron Taub.
- Hylodesmum H.Ohashi & R.R.Mill
- Hymenaea L.
- Hymenolobium Benth.
- Hymenostegia Harms
- Hypocalyptus Thunb.

== I ==
- Ibatiria W.E.Cooper
- Icuria Wieringa
- Imbralyx R.Geesink
- Indigastrum Jaub. & Spach
- Indigofera L.
- Indopiptadenia Brenan
- Inga Mill.
- Ingopsis (Barneby & J.W.Grimes) Ferm
- Inocarpus J.R.Forst. & G.Forst.
- Intsia Thouars
- Isoberlinia Craib & Stapf
- Isotropis Benth.

== J ==
- Jacksonia R.Br. ex Sm.
- Jacqueshuberia Ducke
- Jennata R.L.Barrett, Clugston & Orthia
- Julbernardia Pellegr.
- Jupunba Britton & Rose

== K ==
- Kalappia Kosterm.
- Kanaloa Lorence & K.R.Wood
- Kanburia J.Compton, Mattapha, Sirich. & Schrire
- Kanjilalia Sanjappa & Pusalkar
- Kartalinia Brullo, C.Brullo, Cambria, Acar, Salmeri & Giusso
- Kebirita Kramina & D.D.Sokoloff
- Kennedia Vent.
- Koompassia Maingay ex Benth.
- Kotschya Endl.
- Kummerowia Schindl.
- Kunstleria Prain

== L ==
- Labichea Gaudich. ex DC.
- Lablab Adans.
- Laburnum Fabr.
- Lachesiodendron P.G.Ribeiro, L.P.Queiroz & Luckow
- Lackeya Fortunato, L.P.Queiroz & G.P.Lewis
- Ladeania A.N.Egan & Reveal
- Lamprolobium Benth.
- Lathyrus L.
- Latrobea Meisn.
- Lebeckia Thunb.
- Lebruniodendron J.Léonard
- Lecointea Ducke
- Lemurodendron Villiers & P.Guinet
- Lennea Klotzsch
- Leobordea Delile
- Leonardoxa Aubrév.
- Leptoderris Dunn
- Leptodesmia (Benth.) Benth. & Hook.f.
- Leptolobium Vogel
- Leptosema Benth.
- Leptospron (Benth. & Hook.f.) A.Delgado
- Lespedeza Michx.
- Lessertia DC.
- Leucaena Benth.
- Leucochloron Barneby & J.W.Grimes
- Leucomphalos Benth.
- Leucostegane Prain
- Libidibia Schltdl.
- Librevillea Hoyle
- Limadendron Meireles & A.M.G.Azevedo
- Liparia L.
- Listia E.Mey.
- Loesenera Harms
- Lonchocarpus Kunth
- Lophocarpinia Burkart
- Loricobbia R.L.Barrett, Clugston & Orthia
- Lotononis (DC.) Eckl. & Zeyh.
- Lotus L.
- Luetzelburgia Harms
- Lupinus L.
- Lysidice Hance
- Lysiloma Benth.
- Lysiphyllum (Benth.) de Wit

== M ==
- Maackia Rupr.
- Machaerium Pers.
- Macrolobium Schreb.
- Macropsychanthus Harms
- Macroptilium (Benth.) Urb.
- Macrosamanea Britton & Rose
- Macrotyloma (Wight & Arn.) Verdc.
- Maekawaea H.Ohashi & K.Ohashi
- Mantiqueira L.P.Queiroz
- Maraniona C.E.Hughes, G.P.Lewis, Daza & Reynel
- Marina Liebm.
- Mariosousa Seigler & Ebinger
- Marlimorimia L.P.Queiroz, L.M.Borges, Marc.F.Simon & P.G.Ribeiro
- Martiodendron Gleason
- Mastersia Benth.
- Mecopus Benn.
- Medicago L.
- Melanoxylum Schott
- Melilotus Mill.
- Melliniella Harms
- Melolobium Eckl. & Zeyh.
- Mendoravia Capuron
- Mezcala C.E.Hughes & J.L.Contr.
- Mezoneuron Desf.
- Michelsonia Hauman
- Micklethwaitia G.P.Lewis & Schrire
- Microberlinia A.Chev.
- Microcharis Benth.
- Microlobius C.Presl
- Mildbraediodendron Harms
- Millettia Wight & Arn.
- Mimosa L.
- Mimozyganthus Burkart
- Mirbelia Sm.
- Moldenhawera Schrad.
- Monarthrocarpus Merr.
- Monopteryx Spruce ex Benth.
- Montigena Heenan
- Mora Benth.
- Moullava (Adans.) E. Gagnon & G. P. Lewis
- Mucuna Adans.
- Muellera L.f.
- Muelleranthus Hutch
- Mundulea (DC) Benth.
- Murtonia Craib
- Myrocarpus Allemão
- Myrospermum Jacq.
- Myroxylon L.f.
- Mysanthus G.P.Lewis & A.Delgado

== N ==
- Naiadendron A.G.Lima, Paula-Souza & Scalon
- Nanhaia J.Compton & Schrire
- Nanogalactia L.P.Queiroz
- Neltuma Raf.
- Neoapaloxylon Rauschert
- Neochevalierodendron J.Léonard
- Neocollettia Hemsl.
- Neoharmsia R.Vig.
- Neonotonia J.A.Lackey
- Neorautanenia Schinz
- Nephrodesmus Schindl.
- Neptunia Lour.
- Nesphostylis Verdc.
- Neustanthus Benth.
- Newtonia Baill.
- Nissolia Jacq.
- Nogra Merr.
- Normandiodendron J.Léonard

== O ==
- Oberholzeria Swanepoel, M.M.le Roux, M.F.Wojc. & A.E.van Wyk
- Oddoniodendron De Wild.
- Ohashia X.Y.Zhu & R.P.Zhang
- Ohwia H.Ohashi
- Olneya A.Gray
- Onobrychis Mill.
- Ononis L.
- Ophrestia H.M.L.Forbes
- Orbexilum Raf.
- Ormocarpopsis R.Vig.
- Ormocarpum P.Beauv.
- Ormosia Jacks.
- Ornithopus L.
- Orphanodendron Barneby & J.W.Grimes
- Osodendron E.J.M.Koenen
- Ostryocarpus Hook.f.
- Otholobium C.H.Stirt. – synonym of Psoralea
- Otoptera DC.
- Ototropis Nees
- Ougeinia Benth.
- Oxylobium Andrews
- Oxyrhynchus Brandegee
- Oxytes (Schindl.) H.Ohashi & K.Ohashi
- Oxytropis DC.

== P ==
- Pachyelasma Harms
- Pachyrhizus Rich. ex DC.
- Padbruggea Miq.
- Painteria Britton & Rose
- Paloue Aubl.
- Panurea Spruce ex Benth. & Hook.f.
- Paracalyx Ali
- Paragoodia I.Thomps.
- Paramachaerium Ducke
- Paramacrolobium J.Léonard
- Parapiptadenia Brenan
- Pararchidendron I.C.Nielsen
- Parasenegalia Seigler & Ebinger
- Paraserianthes I.C.Nielsen
- Parkia R.Br.
- Parkinsonia Plum. ex L.
- Parochetus Buch.-Ham. ex D.Don
- Parryella Torr. & A.Gray
- Paubrasilia Gagnon, H.C.Lima & G.P.Lewis
- Pearsonia Dümmer
- Pediomelum Rydb.
- Pedleya H.Ohashi & K.Ohashi
- Peltogyne Vogel
- Peltophorum (Vogel) Benth.
- Pentaclethra Benth.
- Periandra Mart. ex Benth.
- Pericopsis Thwaites
- Petaladenium Ducke
- Petalostylis R.Br.
- Peteria A.Gray
- Petteria C.Presl
- Phanera Lour.
- Phaseolus L.
- Philenoptera Hochst. ex A.Rich.
- Phylacium Benn.
- Phyllodium Desv.
- Phyllota Benth.
- Phylloxylon Baill.
- Physostigma Balf.
- Pickeringia Nutt. ex Torr. & A.Gray
- Pictarena Becklund
- Pictetia DC.
- Piliostigma Hochst.
- Piptadenia Benth.
- Piptadeniastrum Brenan
- Piptadeniopsis Burkart
- Piptanthus Sweet
- Piscidia L.
- Pithecellobium Mart.
- Pityrocarpa (Benth. & Hook.f.) Britton & Rose
- Plagiocarpus Benth.
- Plagiosiphon Harms
- Plathymenia Benth.
- Platycelyphium Harms
- Platycyamus Benth.
- Platylobium Sm.
- Platymiscium Vogel
- Platyosprion Maxim.
- Platypodium Vogel
- Platysepalum Welw. ex Baker
- Pleurolobus J.St.-Hil.
- Podalyria Willd.
- Podlechiella Maassoumi & Kaz.Osaloo
- Podocytisus Boiss. & Heldr.
- Podolobium R.Br.
- Podolotus Royle ex Benth.
- Poecilanthe Benth.
- Poeppigia C.Presl
- Poiretia Vent.
- Poissonia Baill.
- Poitea Vent.
- Polhillia C.H.Stirt.
- Polhillides H.Ohashi & K.Ohashi
- Polystemonanthus Harms
- Pomaria Cav.
- Pongamia Adans.
- Pongamiopsis R.Vig.
- Prioria Griseb.
- Prosopidastrum Burkart
- Prosopis L.
- Pseudalbizzia Britton & Rose
- Pseudarthria Wight & Arn.
- Pseudeminia Verdc.
- Pseudocojoba (Barneby & J.W.Grimes) Ferm
- Pseudoeriosema Hauman
- Pseudolotus Rech.f.
- Pseudoprosopis Harms
- Pseudosamanea Harms
- Pseudosenegalia Seigler & Ebinger
- Pseudovigna (Harms) Verdc.
- Psophocarpus Neck. ex DC.
- Psoralea L.
- Psorodendron Rydb.
- Psorothamnus Rydb.
- Pterocarpus Jacq.
- Pterodon Vogel
- Pterogyne Tul.
- Pterolobium R.Br. ex Wight & Arn.
- Ptycholobium Harms
- Ptychosema Benth.
- Pueraria DC.
- Puhuaea H.Ohashi & K.Ohashi
- Pullenia H.Ohashi & K.Ohashi
- Pultenaea Sm.
- Punjuba Britton & Rose
- Pycnospora R.Br. ex Wight & Arn.
- Pyranthus Du Puy & Labat

== R ==
- Rafnia Thunb.
- Ramirezella Rose
- Ramorinoa Speg.
- Recordoxylon Ducke
- Requienia DC.
- Retama Raf.
- Rhodopis Urb.
- Rhynchosia Lour.
- Rhynchotropis Harms
- Ricoa Duno & Torke
- Riedeliella Harms
- Rivasgodaya Esteve
- Robinia L.
- Robrichia (Barneby & J.W.Grimes) A.R.M.Luz & E.R.Souza
- Robynsiophyton R.Wilczek
- Rothia Pers.
- Rupertia J.W.Grimes

== S ==
- Sakoanala R.Vig.
- Salweenia Baker f.
- Samanea (Benth.) Merr.
- Sanjappa E.R.Souza & Krishnaraj
- Saraca L.
- Sarcodum Lour.
- Schefflerodendron Harms
- Schizolobium Vogel
- Schleinitzia Warb.
- Schnella Raddi
- Schotia Jacq.
- Scorodophloeus Harms
- Scorpiurus L.
- Sellocharis Taub.
- Senegalia Raf.
- Senna Mill.
- Serawaia J.Compton & Schrire
- Serianthes Benth.
- Sesbania Adans.
- Shuteria Wight & Arn.
- Sigmoidala J.Compton & Schrire
- Sigmoidotropis (Piper) A.Delgado
- Sindora Miq.
- Sindoropsis J.Léonard
- Sinodolichos Verdc.
- Smirnowia Bunge
- Smithia Aiton
- Soemmeringia Mart.
- Sohmaea H.Ohashi & K.Ohashi
- Sophora L.
- Spartium L.
- Spathionema Taub.
- Spatholobus Hassk.
- Sphaerolobium Sm.
- Sphaerophysa DC.
- Sphenostylis E.Mey.
- Sphinctospermum Rose
- Sphinga Barneby & J.W.Grimes
- Spirotropis Tul.
- Stachyothyrsus Harms
- Staminodianthus D.B.O.S.Cardoso, H.C.Lima & L.P.Queiroz
- Stauracanthus Link
- Steinbachiella Harms
- Stemonocoleus Harms
- Stenodrepanum Harms
- Stirtonanthus B.-E.van Wyk & A.L.Schutte
- Stonesiella Crisp & P.H.Weston
- Storckiella Seem
- Streblorrhiza Endl.
- Strombocarpa (Benth.) Engelm. & A.Gray
- Strongylodon Vogel
- Strophostyles Elliott
- Stryphnodendron Mart.
- Stuhlmannia Taub.
- Stylosanthes Sw.
- Styphnolobium Schott
- Sulla Medik.
- Sunhangia H.Ohashi & K.Ohashi
- Swainsona Salisb.
- Swartzia Schreb.
- Sweetia Spreng.
- Sylvichadsia Du Puy & Labat
- Sympetalandra Stapf

== T ==
- Tabaroa L.P.Queiroz, G.P.Lewis & M.F.Wojc.
- Tachigali Aubl.
- Tadehagi H.Ohashi
- Talbotiella Baker f.
- Tamarindus Tourn. ex L.
- Tara Molina
- Taralea Aubl.
- Tateishia H.Ohashi & K.Ohashi
- Taverniera DC.
- Templetonia R.Br.
- Tephrosia Pers.
- Teramnus P.Browne
- Tessmannia Harms
- Tetraberlinia (Harms) Hauman
- Tetrapleura Benth.
- Tetrapterocarpon Humbert
- Teyleria Backer
- Thailentadopsis Kosterm.
- Thermopsis R.Br.
- Thinicola J.H.Ross
- Tibetia (Ali) H.P.Tsui
- Ticanto Adans.
- Tipuana Benth
- Tournaya A.Schmitz
- Toxicopueraria A.N.Egan & B.Pan
- Trifidacanthus Merr.
- Trifolium Tourn. ex L.
- Trigonella L.
- Tripodion Medik.
- Trischidium Tul.
- Tylosema (Schweinf.) Torre & Hillc.

== U ==
- Uittienia Steenis
- Uleanthus Harms
- Ulex L.
- Umtiza Sim
- Uraria Desv.
- Urariopsis Schindl.
- Uribea Dugand & Romero
- Urodon Turcz.

== V ==
- Vachellia Wight & Arn.
- Vandasina Rauschert
- Vatairea Aubl.
- Vataireopsis Ducke
- Vatovaea Chiov.
- Verdesmum H.Ohashi & K.Ohashi
- Vicia L.
- Vigna Savi
- Viguieranthus Villiers
- Villosocallerya L.Duan, J.Compton & Schrire
- Viminaria Sm.
- Virgilia Lam.
- Vouacapoua Aubl.
- Vuralia Uysal & Ertuğrul

== W ==
- Wajira Thulin
- Wallaceodendron Koord.
- Weberbauerella Ulbr.
- Weizhia G.Y.Li, Z.H.Chen, K.W.Jiang & B.Pan bis
- Whitfordiodendron Elmer
- Wiborgia Thunb.
- Wiborgiella Boatwr. & B.-E.van Wyk
- Wisteria Nutt.
- Wisteriopsis J.Compton & Schrire

== X ==
- Xanthocercis Baill.
- Xerocladia Harv.
- Xiphotheca Eckl. & Zeyh.
- Xylia Benth.

== Z ==
- Zapoteca H.M.Hern.
- Zenia Chun
- Zenkerella Taub.
- Zollernia Wied-Neuw. & Nees
- Zornia J.F.Gmel.
- Zuccagnia Cav
- Zygia P.Browne
- Zygocarpum Thulin & Lavin
