= Mezcala =

Mezcala may refer to:

- Mezcala culture, also referred to as the Balsas culture
- Mezcala de la Asuncion, a Coca people village in the municipality of Poncitlán, Jalisco (Mezcala (Jalisco))
- Isla Mezcala, in Lake Chapala, in Jalisco, and Michoacán.
- Río Grande de Santiago, begins at Lake Chapala and drains it
- Río Lerma, ends at Lake Chapala and fills it
- Balsas River, it forms the border between Guerrero and Michoacán
- Mezcala Bridge (Mezcala-Solidaridad Bridge), a bridge in Guerrero, Mexico
- Mezcala (plant), a genus of plants in the pea family (Fabaceae)
