= Mantiqueira =

Mantiqueira may refer to:

- Mantiqueira Mountains (Serra de Mantiqueira), a mountain range in southeastern Brazil;
- Mantiqueira (plant), a genus of plants in the pea family (Fabaceae)
