= Boliviadendron =

Scientific classification
- Kingdom: Plantae
- Clade: Tracheophytes
- Clade: Angiosperms
- Clade: Eudicots
- Clade: Rosids
- Order: Fabales
- Family: Fabaceae
- Subfamily: Caesalpinioideae
- Clade: Mimosoid clade
- Genus: Boliviadendron; E.R.Souza & C.E.Hughes (2022)
- Species: B. bolivianum

Binomial name
- Boliviadendron bolivianum (C.E.Hughes & Atahuachi) E.R.Souza & C.E.Hughes (2022)

Synonyms
- Leucochloron bolivianum C.E.Hughes & Atahuachi (2007)

Genus of plants

Boliviadendron is a genus of flowering plants in the pea family (Fabaceae). It contains a single species, Boliviadendron bolivianum, a tree endemic to Bolivia.
