= Ingopsis =

Scientific classification
- Kingdom: Plantae
- Clade: Tracheophytes
- Clade: Angiosperms
- Clade: Eudicots
- Clade: Rosids
- Order: Fabales
- Family: Fabaceae
- Subfamily: Caesalpinioideae
- Clade: Mimosoid clade
- Tribe: Ingeae
- Genus: Ingopsis (Barneby & J.W.Grimes) Ferm
- Species: I. inundata

Binomial name
- Ingopsis inundata (Ducke) Ferm

Synonyms
- Zygia sect. Ingopsis Barneby & J.W.Grimes (1997) (genus basionym); Inga inundata Ducke (1922) (species basionym); Pithecellobium inundabile Ducke; Pithecellobium inundatum (Ducke) Ducke; Zygia inundata (Ducke) H.C.Lima ex Barneby & J.W.Grimes

Genus of flowering plants

Ingopsis is a genus of flowering plants in the family Fabaceae. It includes a single species, Ingopsis inundata, which is native to northern Brazil, French Guiana, and Peru.
