= Pseudocojoba =

Scientific classification
- Kingdom: Plantae
- Clade: Tracheophytes
- Clade: Angiosperms
- Clade: Eudicots
- Clade: Rosids
- Order: Fabales
- Family: Fabaceae
- Subfamily: Caesalpinioideae
- Clade: Mimosoid clade
- Tribe: Ingeae
- Genus: Pseudocojoba (Barneby & J.W.Grimes) Ferm
- Species: P. sabatieri

Binomial name
- Pseudocojoba sabatieri (Barneby & J.W.Grimes) Ferm

Synonyms
- Zygia sect. Pseudocojoba Barneby & J.W.Grimes; Zygia sabatieri Barneby & J.W.Grimes (1997) (species basionym)

Genus of flowering plants

Pseudocojoba is a genus of flowering plants in the family Fabaceae. It includes a single species, Pseudocojoba sabatieri, a tree endemic to French Guiana.
