= Thailentadopsis =

Scientific classification
- Kingdom: Plantae
- Clade: Tracheophytes
- Clade: Angiosperms
- Clade: Eudicots
- Clade: Rosids
- Order: Fabales
- Family: Fabaceae
- Subfamily: Caesalpinioideae
- Clade: Mimosoid clade
- Genus: Thailentadopsis; Kosterm. (1977)

Species
- Thailentadopsis nitida (Vahl) G.P.Lewis & Schrire; Thailentadopsis tenuis (Craib) Kosterm.; Thailentadopsis vietnamensis (I.C.Nielsen) G.P.Lewis & Schrire

Genus of legumes

Thailentadopsis is a genus of flowering plants in the family Fabaceae. It includes three species of shrubs and small trees, one each native to Sri Lanka, Thailand, and Vietnam. Typical habitat is seasonally-dry tropical forest along rivers and in inundated areas, often on limestone. It belongs to the mimosoid clade of subfamily Caesalpinioideae.
