= Nanogalactia =

Scientific classification
- Kingdom: Plantae
- Clade: Tracheophytes
- Clade: Angiosperms
- Clade: Eudicots
- Clade: Rosids
- Order: Fabales
- Family: Fabaceae
- Genus: Nanogalactia; L.P.Queiroz (2020)

Species
- Nanogalactia brachystachys (Benth.) L.P.Queiroz; Nanogalactia heterophylla (Gillies ex Hook.) L.P.Queiroz; Nanogalactia pretiosa (Burkart) L.P.Queiroz

Genus of flowering plants in the legume family

Nanogalactia is a genus of flowering plants in the legume family (Fabaceae). It includes three species native to the tropical and subtropical Americas. The species have a disjunct distribution – Texas to southwestern Mexico, Colombia, and northeastern and west-central Brazil through Bolivia, Paraguay, and Uruguay to northern Argentina.

- Nanogalactia brachystachys (Benth.) L.P.Queiroz – northern, central, and southwestern Mexico
- Nanogalactia heterophylla (Gillies ex Hook.) L.P.Queiroz – Texas, northeastern and southwestern Mexico, Colombia, and Bolivia and southeastern Brazil through Paraguay, Uruguay, and northern Argentina
- Nanogalactia pretiosa (Burkart) L.P.Queiroz – northeastern and west-central Brazil to Paraguay, Uruguay, and northeastern Argentina (Misiones)
