= Gretheria =

Scientific classification
- Kingdom: Plantae
- Clade: Tracheophytes
- Clade: Angiosperms
- Clade: Eudicots
- Clade: Rosids
- Order: Fabales
- Family: Fabaceae
- Genus: Gretheria; Duno & Torke (2022)

Species
- Gretheria campylacantha (L.Rico & M.Sousa) Duno & Torke; Gretheria sonorae (S.Watson) Duno & Torke

Genus of flowering plants

Gretheria is a genus of flowering plants in the legume family, Fabaceae. It includes two species of trees native to tropical and subtropical North America, ranging from northern Mexico to Costa Rica.

- Gretheria campylacantha (L.Rico & M.Sousa) Duno & Torke – southwestern Mexico and Honduras, Nicaragua, and Costa Rica
- Gretheria sonorae (S.Watson) Duno & Torke – northern Mexico
