= Afroamphica =

Scientific classification
- Kingdom: Plantae
- Clade: Tracheophytes
- Clade: Angiosperms
- Clade: Eudicots
- Clade: Rosids
- Order: Fabales
- Family: Fabaceae
- Genus: Afroamphica; H.Ohashi & K.Ohashi
- Species: A. africana

Binomial name
- Afroamphica africana (Hook.f.) H.Ohashi & K.Ohashi

Genus of flowering plants

Afroamphica is a genus of flowering plants belonging to the family Fabaceae. The only species is Afroamphica africana.

Its native range is Tropical Africa.
