= Indopiptadenia =

Scientific classification
- Kingdom: Plantae
- Clade: Tracheophytes
- Clade: Angiosperms
- Clade: Eudicots
- Clade: Rosids
- Order: Fabales
- Family: Fabaceae
- Subfamily: Caesalpinioideae
- Clade: Mimosoid clade
- Genus: Indopiptadenia; Brenan (1955)
- Species: I. oudhensis

Binomial name
- Indopiptadenia oudhensis (Brandis) Brenan (1955)

Synonyms
- Adenanthera oudhensis J.L.Stewart ex Brandis (1874), pro syn.; Piptadenia oudhensis Brandis (1874)

Genus of legumes

Indopiptadenia is a genus of flowering plants in the family Fabaceae. It contains a single species, Indopiptadenia oudhensis, a tree native to the western and central Himalayas, including Nepal, and Uttar Pradesh in northern India. The genus belongs to the mimosoid clade in the subfamily Caesalpinioideae.
