= Urariopsis =

Scientific classification
- Kingdom: Plantae
- Clade: Tracheophytes
- Clade: Angiosperms
- Clade: Eudicots
- Clade: Rosids
- Order: Fabales
- Family: Fabaceae
- Genus: Urariopsis; Schindl. (1916)

Species
- Urariopsis brevissima Yen C.Yang & P.H.Huang; Urariopsis cordifolia Schindl.

Genus of plants

Urariopsis is a genus of flowering plants in the legume family, Fabaceae. It includes two species of shrubs and subshrubs native to southern China.
