= Gagnebina =

Scientific classification
- Kingdom: Plantae
- Clade: Tracheophytes
- Clade: Angiosperms
- Clade: Eudicots
- Clade: Rosids
- Order: Fabales
- Family: Fabaceae
- Subfamily: Caesalpinioideae
- Clade: Mimosoid clade
- Genus: Gagnebina; Neck ex DC. (1825)

Genus of legumes

Gagnebina is a genus of flowering plants in the family Fabaceae. It belongs to the mimosoid clade of subfamily Caesalpinioideae. It includes five species native to the islands of the Western Indian Ocean – Aldabra, Comoros, Madagascar, and Mauritius.

- Gagnebina bakoliae Luckow & Du Puy – Madagascar
- Gagnebina calcicola (R.Vig.) Renvoize – western Madagascar
- Gagnebina commersoniana (Baill.) R.Vig. – Madagascar
- Gagnebina microcephala (Renvoize) Villiers – northeastern Madagascar and Aldabra
- Gagnebina pterocarpa (Lam.) Baill. – Comoros, northern and northwestern Madagascar, and Mauritius
