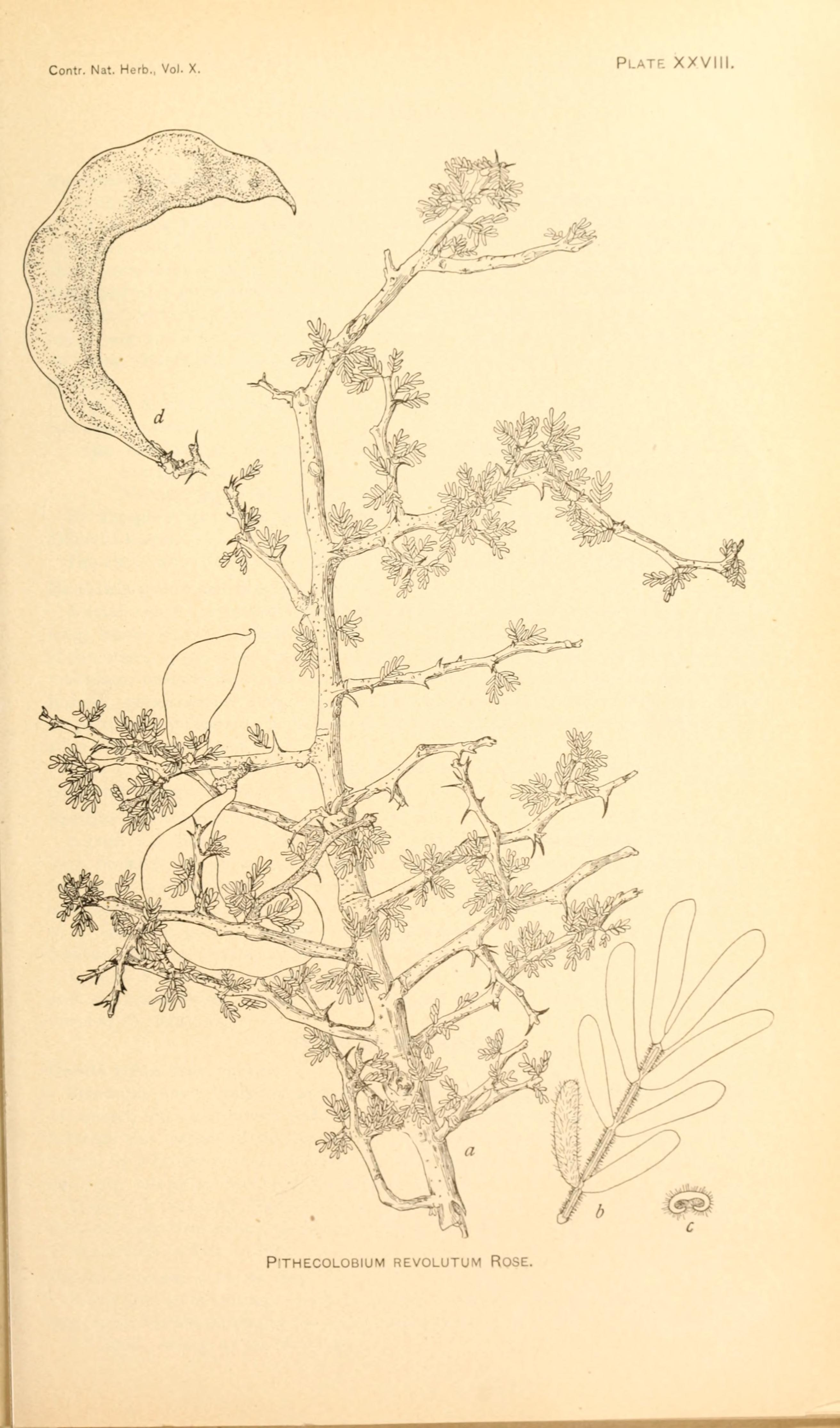
- Painteria revoluta

Scientific classification
- Kingdom: Plantae
- Clade: Tracheophytes
- Clade: Angiosperms
- Clade: Eudicots
- Clade: Rosids
- Order: Fabales
- Family: Fabaceae
- Subfamily: Caesalpinioideae
- Clade: Mimosoid clade
- Genus: Painteria; Britton & Rose (1928)

Species
- 2; see text

= Painteria =

Genus of legumes

Painteria is a genus of flowering plants in the family Fabaceae. It includes two species of shrubs or small trees native to Mexico. Typical habitats include desert grassland and shrubland (matorral) on the Mexican Plateau, and in the lowlands of Tamaulipas in northeastern Mexico. It belongs to the mimosoid clade of the subfamily Caesalpinioideae.

Species include:

- Painteria elachistophylla (A.Gray ex S.Watson) Britton & Rose
- Painteria leptophylla (Rose) Britton & Rose
