= Xerocladia =

Scientific classification
- Kingdom: Plantae
- Clade: Tracheophytes
- Clade: Angiosperms
- Clade: Eudicots
- Clade: Rosids
- Order: Fabales
- Family: Fabaceae
- Subfamily: Caesalpinioideae
- Clade: Mimosoid clade
- Genus: Xerocladia; Harv. (1862)
- Species: X. viridiramis

Binomial name
- Xerocladia viridiramis (Burch.) Taub. (1891)

Synonyms
- Acacia viridiramis Burch. (1822); Xerocladia zeyheri Harv. (1862)

Species of legume

Xerocladia viridiramis is a species of plant in the legume family (Fabaceae). It is the sole species in the monotypic genus Xerocladia.

== Name ==
This plant was first discovered in 1822 and named Acacia viridiramis by Burchell. In 1862, Harvey described the new genus Xerocladia, based on his species Xerocladia zeyheri Harv. In 1891, Taubert studied this species and discovered that Burchell and Harvey were actually describing the same species. He also determined that the plant doesn't fit into the genus Acacia and kept the name Xerocladia. Because the earliest publication (after 1753) has priority, Taubert made the new combination Xerocladia viridiramis (Burch.) Taub. In conclusion, Acacia viridiramis Burch. is the basionym for Xerocladia viridiramis (Burch.) Taub, and Xerocladia zeyheri Harv. is a synonym.

== Geographic distribution ==
Namibia and Namaqualand, occurs in sandy to gravel riverbeds, or on riverbanks.

== Plant description ==
Shrub to 1m tall, twigs zig-zag shaped, pale green to olive, terete, internodes 10–14 mm. Leaves alternate, bipinnately compound, with a pair of spiny incurved basal stipules, 1.0-2.5 mm. Rachis 1.0-2.0 mm, with one pair of terminal pinnae, an acuminate to deltoid bract clasping the base of pinnae, small gland opposite the bract between the pinnae, rachilla 5.0-13.0 mm. Leaflets alternate, ovate to elliptic, 2.5-5.5 mm x 0.5-1.5 mm, with 13-17 leaflets per rachilla, margin entire. Inflorescence a capitulum, red to deep maroon, 5.0-8.5 mm in diameter, peduncle hirtellous, 4.0-13.5 mm. Flowers hermaphroditic, actinomorphic. Sepals 5, fused at the base, ovate to deltoid, hirtellous, 0.6-1.2 mm x 0.5–1 mm. Petals 5, ovate to acuminate, free, 2.0-3.0 mm x 0.6-1.0 mm. Stamens 10, distinct, filaments 2.0-2.8 mm, anther dorsifixed, 0.4-0.5 x 0.3-0.5 mm, pollen grains bright yellow. Ovary extremely hirtellous at the base, style 2.3-3.0 mm, stigma club to disc-shaped. Fruit an indehiscent, asymmetric, winged legume, 1-6 per head, 7.5-17.5 x 7.0-12.5 mm, reniform to flabellate, with an acute tip, pericarp red brown, pubescent, raised ridge forming a ring above the seed(s), style and stigma sometimes persistent on the fruit. Seeds 1-2 per fruit, obovate, 2.5-3.0 x 4.5–5 mm.

== Relationship ==
Xerocladia is most closely related to Prosopis (Melissa A. Luckow, personal communication, March 29, 2013 ). They both have stipular spines, leaves with few pairs of pinnae, and 10 stamens. In contrast to Xerocladia, Prosopis usually has a spicate inflorescence instead of a capitulum, an elongate straight or spiral legume pod which is not winged. Prosopis also has more (18-30) leaflets per rachilla, and leaflets opposite or sub opposite rather than alternate.
