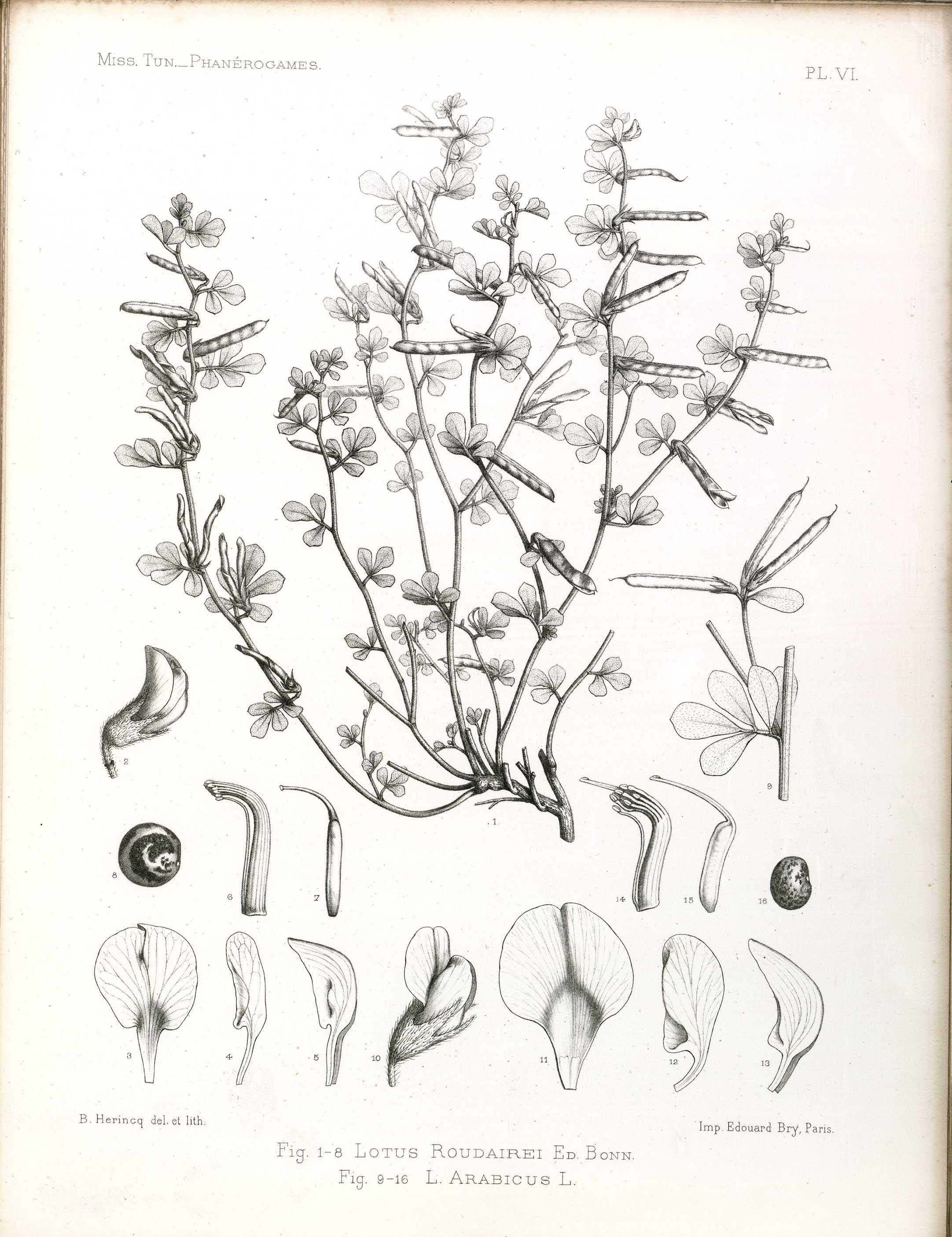
- Illustration of Kebirita roudairei, a species in this genus

Scientific classification
- Kingdom: Plantae
- Clade: Tracheophytes
- Clade: Angiosperms
- Clade: Eudicots
- Clade: Rosids
- Order: Fabales
- Family: Fabaceae
- Genus: Kebirita; Kramina & D.D.Sokoloff (2001)
- Species: K. roudairei

Binomial name
- Kebirita roudairei (Bonnet) Kramina & D.D.Sokoloff (2001)

Synonyms
- Acmispon roudairei (Bonnet) Lassen (1986); Lotus fruticulosus Desf. (1815), not validly publ.; Lotus hosackioides Coss. (1876), not validly publ.; Lotus roudairei Bonnet (1893)

= Kebirita =

Monotypic genus of flowering plants

Kebirita is a monotypic genus of flowering plants belonging to the family Fabaceae. The only species is Kebirita roudairei.

Its native range is the Maghreb – Tunisia, Algeria, Morocco, and Western Sahara – and Mauritania.
