= Pseudoprosopis =

Scientific classification
- Kingdom: Plantae
- Clade: Embryophytes
- Clade: Tracheophytes
- Clade: Spermatophytes
- Clade: Angiosperms
- Clade: Eudicots
- Clade: Rosids
- Order: Fabales
- Family: Fabaceae
- Subfamily: Caesalpinioideae
- Clade: Mimosoid clade
- Genus: Pseudoprosopis; Harms (1902)

Species
- 7; see text

Genus of legumes

Pseudoprosopis is a genus of flowering plants in the family Fabaceae. It includes seven species of shrubs, lianas, or small trees native to tropical Africa. Typical habitats include tropical rain forest, gallery forest, seasonally-dry forest, and dense thicket. Three species are native to west-central Africa (Gabon, Republic of the Congo, and DR Congo), two species to West Africa (Guinea, Sierra Leone and Liberia), and two species to southeastern Africa (Tanzania, Zambia and Mozambique) – one to the Zambezian region and one to the Zanzibar–Inhambane region. The genus belongs to the mimosoid clade of subfamily Caesalpinioideae.

== Species ==
- Pseudoprosopis bampsiana Lisowski
- Pseudoprosopis claessensii (De Wild.) G.C.C.Gilbert & Boutique
- Pseudoprosopis euryphylla Harms
- Pseudoprosopis fischeri Harms
- Pseudoprosopis gilletii (De Wild.) Villiers
- Pseudoprosopis sericea (Hutch. & Dalziel) Brenan
- Pseudoprosopis uncinata C.M.Evrard
