= Murtonia =

Scientific classification
- Kingdom: Plantae
- Clade: Tracheophytes
- Clade: Angiosperms
- Clade: Eudicots
- Clade: Rosids
- Order: Fabales
- Family: Fabaceae
- Genus: Murtonia; Craib (1912)
- Species: M. kerrii

Binomial name
- Murtonia kerrii Craib (1912)

Synonyms
- Desmodium craibii H.Ohashi (1982)

Genus of plants

Murtonia kerrii is a species of flowering plant in the pea family (Fabaceae). It is a climbing perennial or subshrub native to northern Thailand. It is the sole species in genus Murtonia.
