= Fillaeopsis =

Scientific classification
- Kingdom: Plantae
- Clade: Tracheophytes
- Clade: Angiosperms
- Clade: Eudicots
- Clade: Rosids
- Order: Fabales
- Family: Fabaceae
- Subfamily: Caesalpinioideae
- Clade: Mimosoid clade
- Genus: Fillaeopsis; Harms (1899)
- Species: F. discophora

Binomial name
- Fillaeopsis discophora Harms (1899)

Genus of legumes

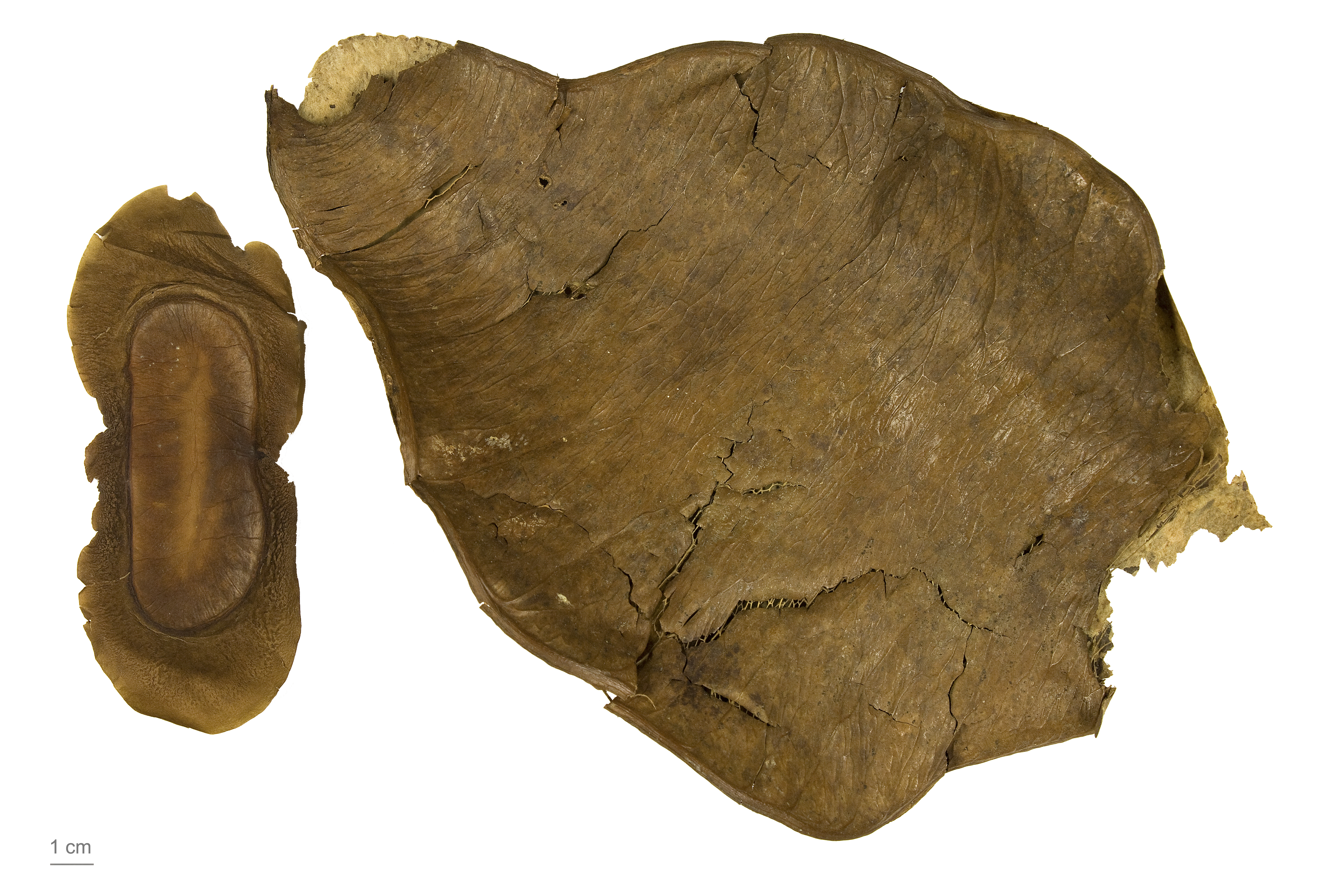
Fillaeopsis discophora - MHNT

Fillaeopsis is a genus of flowering plants in the family Fabaceae. It belongs to the mimosoid clade of the subfamily Caesalpinioideae. It contains a single species, Fillaeopsis discophora. It is a tree native to Nigeria and west-central Africa (Cameroon, Central African Republic, Gabon, Republic of the Congo, and DR Congo). It is a tree of the Guineo-Congolian forest, where it grows up to 130 feet (40 m) tall.
