= Ricoa =

Conservation status
- Least Concern (IUCN 3.1)

Scientific classification
- Kingdom: Plantae
- Clade: Tracheophytes
- Clade: Angiosperms
- Clade: Eudicots
- Clade: Rosids
- Order: Fabales
- Family: Fabaceae
- Genus: Ricoa; Duno & Torke (2022)
- Species: R. leptophylla

Binomial name
- Ricoa leptophylla (DC.) Duno & Torke (2022)

Synonyms
- Acacia leptophylla DC. (1813); Acacia mauroceana DC. (1813); Acacia purpurea Bolle (1861); Inga leptophylla (DC.) Lag. (1816); Mimosa leptophylla Brouss. ex Lag. (1816), not validly publ.; Mimosa mauroceana Desf. ex Poir. (1810); Painteria leptophylla (DC.) Britton & Rose (1928); Pithecellobium leptophyllum (DC.) Daveau (1912 publ. 1913); Pithecellobium palmeri Hemsl. (1880); Pithecellobium palmeri var. recurvum S.Watson (1888)

Genus of flowering plants

Ricoa is a genus of flowering plants in the pea family (Fabaceae). It contains a single species, Ricoa leptophylla, a tree or shrub native to northern, central, and southwestern Mexico. This genus was named in honor of María de Lourdes Rico-Arce.
