= Cerradicola =

Scientific classification
- Kingdom: Plantae
- Clade: Tracheophytes
- Clade: Angiosperms
- Clade: Eudicots
- Clade: Rosids
- Order: Fabales
- Family: Fabaceae
- Genus: Cerradicola; L.P.Queiroz (2020)

Species
- 16; see text

Genus of plants

Cerradicola is a genus of flowering plants in the pea family (Fabaceae). It includes 16 species native to Brazil, Bolivia, Paraguay, Uruguay, and northern Argentina.

== Species ==
16 species are accepted:

- Cerradicola aurea L.P.Queiroz
- Cerradicola boavista (Vell.) L.P.Queiroz
- Cerradicola bullata (Benth.) L.P.Queiroz
- Cerradicola decumbens (Benth.) L.P.Queiroz
- Cerradicola diversifolia (Benth.) L.P.Queiroz
- Cerradicola elliptica (Desv.) L.P.Queiroz
- Cerradicola eriosematoides (Harms) L.P.Queiroz
- Cerradicola grewiifolia (Benth.) L.P.Queiroz
- Cerradicola heringeri (Burkart) L.P.Queiroz
- Cerradicola irwinii (R.S.Cowan) L.P.Queiroz
- Cerradicola lamprophylla (Harms) L.P.Queiroz
- Cerradicola longifolia (Benth.) L.P.Queiroz
- Cerradicola nana (Burkart) L.P.Queiroz
- Cerradicola peduncularis (Benth.) L.P.Queiroz
- Cerradicola praeandina (Burkart) L.P.Queiroz
- Cerradicola rotundifolia (Benth.) L.P.Queiroz
