= Harashuteria =

Scientific classification
- Kingdom: Plantae
- Clade: Tracheophytes
- Clade: Angiosperms
- Clade: Eudicots
- Clade: Rosids
- Order: Fabales
- Family: Fabaceae
- Genus: Harashuteria; K.Ohashi & H.Ohashi (2017)
- Species: H. hirsuta

Binomial name
- Harashuteria hirsuta (Baker) K.Ohashi & H.Ohashi (2017)

Synonyms
- Amphicarpaea linearis Chun & H.Y.Chen (1958); Pueraria anabaptista Kurz (1876), nom. superfl.; Shuteria anabaptista C.Y.Wu (1946), nom. superfl.; Shuteria hirsuta Baker (1876); Shuteria lancangensis Y.Y.Qian (2003)

Genus of flowering plants

Harashuteria is a genus of flowering plants in the legume family (Fabaceae). It includes a single species, Harashuteria hirsuta, a climbing perennial native to southeastern Asia, ranging from Nepal through Indochina to south-central China and Hainan.
