= Ohashia =

Scientific classification
- Kingdom: Plantae
- Clade: Tracheophytes
- Clade: Angiosperms
- Clade: Eudicots
- Clade: Rosids
- Order: Fabales
- Family: Fabaceae
- Genus: Ohashia; X.Y.Zhu & R.P.Zhang (2021)
- Species: O. yunnanensis

Binomial name
- Ohashia yunnanensis (Chun & F.C.How) X.Y.Zhu & R.P.Zhang (2021)

Synonyms
- Derris yunnanensis Chun & F.C.How (1952)

Genus of plants

Ohashia yunnanensis is a species of flowering plant in the legume family, Fabaceae. It is a climber native to southern China. It is the sole species in genus Ohashia.
