= Caetangil =

Scientific classification
- Kingdom: Plantae
- Clade: Tracheophytes
- Clade: Angiosperms
- Clade: Eudicots
- Clade: Rosids
- Order: Fabales
- Family: Fabaceae
- Genus: Caetangil; L.P.Queiroz (2020)

Species
- Caetangil chacoensis L.P.Queiroz; Caetangil paraguariensis (Chodat & Hassl.) L.P.Queiroz

Genus of flowering plants

Caetangil is a genus of flowering plants in the pea family (Fabaceae). It is named after the Brazilian singers Caetano Veloso and Gilberto Gil for their cultural contributions and support of environmental causes. It includes two species of subshrubs native to South America, ranging from northern Brazil through Bolivia and Paraguay to northeastern Argentina.

- Caetangil chacoensis L.P.Queiroz – Brazil (Mato Grosso do Sul) to Paraguay and northeastern Argentina
- Caetangil paraguariensis (Chodat & Hassl.) L.P.Queiroz – northern Brazil through Bolivia and Paraguay to northeastern Argentina
