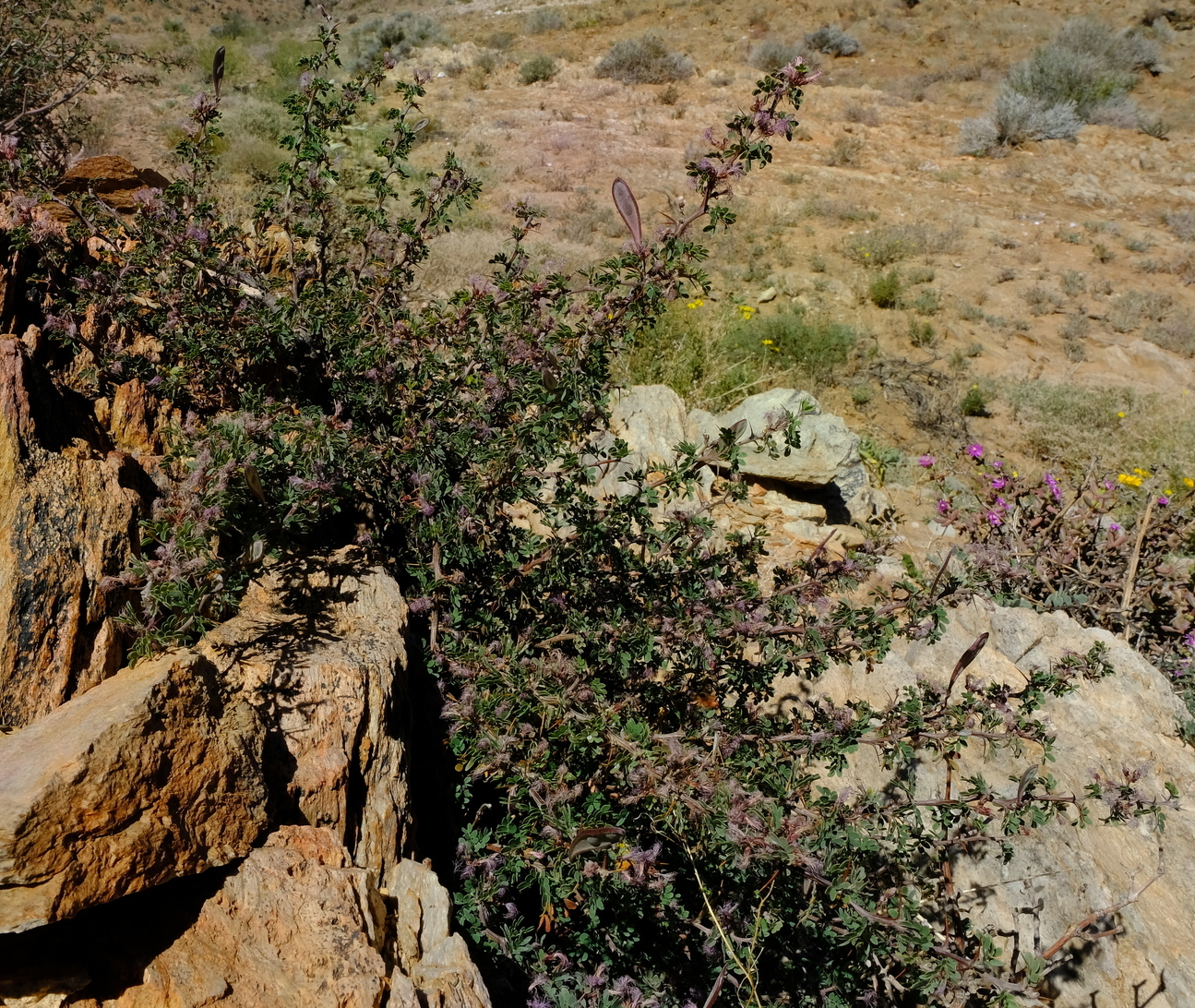
- Afrocalliandra redacta

Scientific classification
- Kingdom: Plantae
- Clade: Tracheophytes
- Clade: Angiosperms
- Clade: Eudicots
- Clade: Rosids
- Order: Fabales
- Family: Fabaceae
- Subfamily: Caesalpinioideae
- Clade: Mimosoid clade
- Genus: Afrocalliandra; E.R. Souza & L.P. Queiroz (2013)

Species
- Afrocalliandra gilbertii (Thulin & Hunde) E.R.Souza & L.P.Queiroz; Afrocalliandra redacta (J.H.Ross) E.R.Souza & L.P.Queiroz

= Afrocalliandra =

Genus of legumes

Afrocalliandra is a genus of flowering plants in the family Fabaceae. It belongs to the mimosoid clade of the subfamily Caesalpinioideae. It includes two species, both native to sub-Saharan Africa:

- Afrocalliandra gilbertii (Thulin & Hunde) E.R.Souza & L.P.Queiroz – central Somalia to northeastern and eastern-central Kenya.
- Afrocalliandra redacta (J.H.Ross) E.R.Souza & L.P.Queiroz – northwestern Cape Provinces of South Africa
