= Marlimorimia =

Scientific classification
- Kingdom: Plantae
- Clade: Tracheophytes
- Clade: Angiosperms
- Clade: Eudicots
- Clade: Rosids
- Order: Fabales
- Family: Fabaceae
- Genus: Marlimorimia; L.P.Queiroz, L.M.Borges, Marc.F.Simon & P.G.Ribeiro (2022)

Species
- six; see text

Genus of flowering plants

Marlimorimia is a genus of flowering plants in the pea family (Fabaceae). It includes six species which range from Costa Rica to southern Brazil and northwestern Argentina.

- Marlimorimia bahiana (G.P.Lewis & M.P.Lima) L.P.Queiroz & L.M.Borges – northeastern Brazil
- Marlimorimia colombiana (Britton & Killip) L.P.Queiroz & Marc.F.Simon – Colombia (Santander)
- Marlimorimia contorta (DC.) L.P.Queiroz & P.G.Ribeiro – eastern Bolivia and eastern Brazil
- Marlimorimia pittieri (Harms) L.P.Queiroz & L.M.Borges – northern Colombia and Venezuela
- Marlimorimia psilostachya (DC.) L.P.Queiroz & Marc.F.Simon Costa Rica and northern South America to Ecuador, northern Brazil, and Bolivia
- Marlimorimia warmingii (Benth.) L.P.Queiroz & P.G.Ribeiro – eastern and southern Brazil and northwestern Argentina
