= Mimozyganthus =

Scientific classification
- Kingdom: Plantae
- Clade: Tracheophytes
- Clade: Angiosperms
- Clade: Eudicots
- Clade: Rosids
- Order: Fabales
- Family: Fabaceae
- Subfamily: Caesalpinioideae
- Clade: Mimosoid clade
- Genus: Mimozyganthus; Burkart (1939)
- Species: M. carinatus

Binomial name
- Mimozyganthus carinatus (Griseb.) Burkart (1939)

Synonyms
- Mimosa carinata Griseb. (1879)

Genus of legumes

Mimozyganthus is a genus of flowering plants in the family Fabaceae. It includes a single species, Mimozyganthus carinatus, a tree native to Bolivia, Paraguay, and northwestern Argentina, where it is known by the common names iscayante and lata. It belongs to the mimosoid clade of the subfamily Caesalpinioideae.
