= Viguieranthus =

Scientific classification
- Kingdom: Plantae
- Clade: Tracheophytes
- Clade: Angiosperms
- Clade: Eudicots
- Clade: Rosids
- Order: Fabales
- Family: Fabaceae
- Subfamily: Caesalpinioideae
- Clade: Mimosoid clade
- Genus: Viguieranthus; Villiers (2002)

Species
- 18; see text

Genus of legumes

Viguieranthus is a genus of flowering plants in the legume family, Fabaceae. It belongs to the mimosoid clade of the subfamily Caesalpinioideae. It includes 18 species of trees and shrubs native to Madagascar and the Comoro Islands. 17 species are endemic to Madagascar, and one (Viguieranthus subauriculatus) also extends to the Comoros. Typical habitats are tropical lowland and submontane humid forest and seasonally-dry woodland, thicket, and scrubland.

- Viguieranthus alternans (Benth.) Villiers
- Viguieranthus ambongensis (R.Vig.) Villiers
- Viguieranthus brevipennatus Villiers
- Viguieranthus cylindricostachys Villiers
- Viguieranthus densinervus Villiers
- Viguieranthus glaber Villiers
- Viguieranthus glandulosus Villiers
- Viguieranthus kony (R.Vig.) Villiers
- Viguieranthus longiracemosus Villiers
- Viguieranthus megalophyllus (R.Vig.) Villiers
- Viguieranthus perrieri (R.Vig.) Villiers
- Viguieranthus pervillei (Drake) Villiers
- Viguieranthus scottianus (R.Vig.) Villiers
- Viguieranthus simulans (R.Vig.) Villiers
- Viguieranthus subauriculatus Villiers
- Viguieranthus umbilicus Villiers
- Viguieranthus unifoliolatus Villiers
- Viguieranthus variabilis Villiers
