= Platyosprion =

Scientific classification
- Kingdom: Plantae
- Clade: Embryophytes
- Clade: Tracheophytes
- Clade: Spermatophytes
- Clade: Angiosperms
- Clade: Eudicots
- Clade: Rosids
- Order: Fabales
- Family: Fabaceae
- Genus: Platyosprion; Maxim. (1876)
- Species: P. platycarpum

Binomial name
- Platyosprion platycarpum (Maxim.) Maxim. (1876)

Synonyms
- Cladrastis chingii Duley & Vincent (2003); Cladrastis parvifolia C.Y.Ma (1982); Cladrastis platycarpa (Maxim.) Makino (1901); Cladrastis platycarpa var. parvifolia (C.Y.Ma) Z.Q.Song, D.X.Xu & Shi J.Li (2014); Cladrastis scandens C.Y.Ma (1982); Cladrastis yungchunii Xiang W.Li & G.S.Fan (1994); Sophora platycarpa Maxim. (1873)

Genus of plants

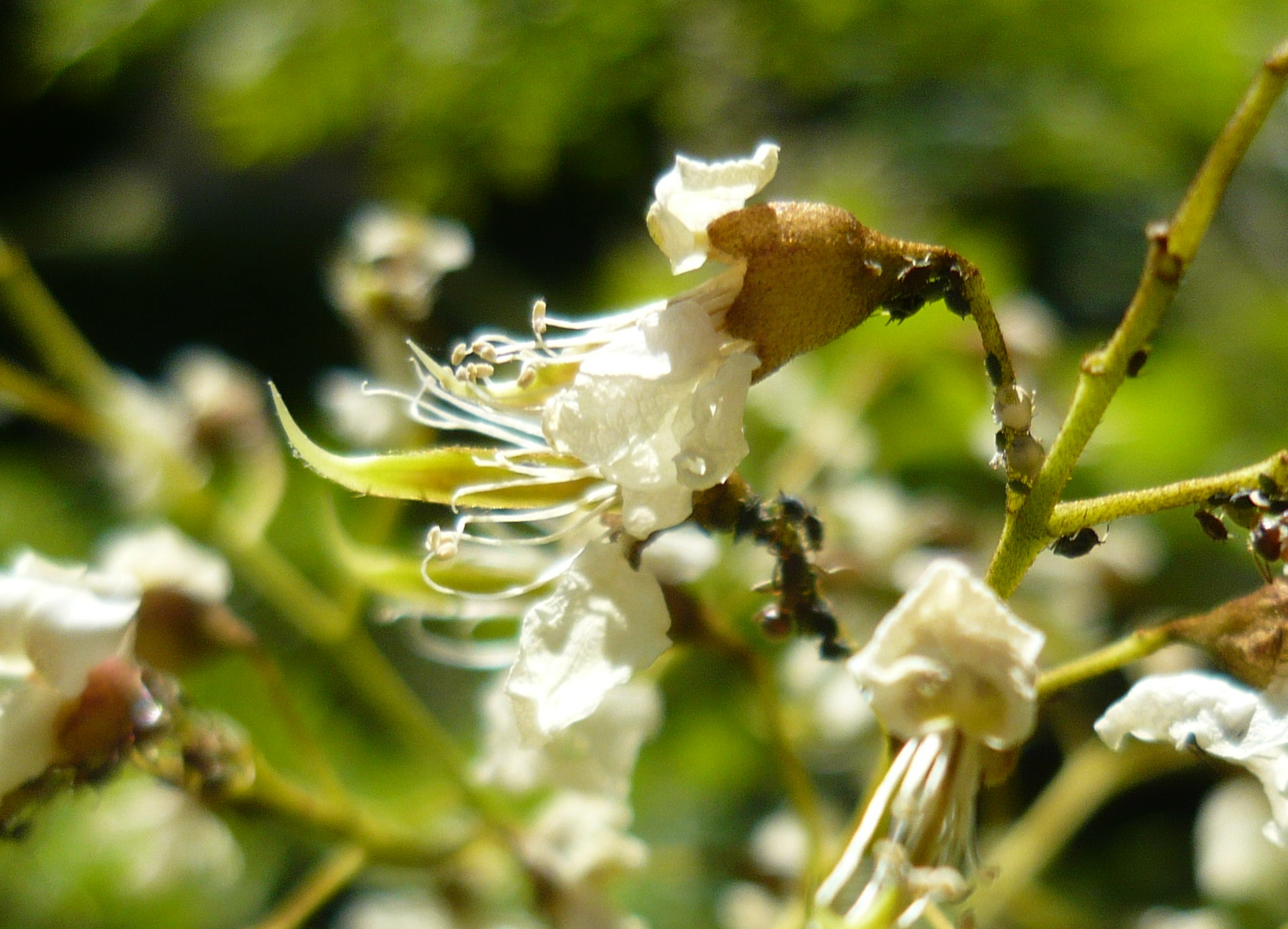

Platyosprion platycarpum is a species of flowering plant in the pea family (Fabaceae). It is a tree native to southern China, South Korea, and the islands of Honshu and Shikoku in Japan. It is the sole species in genus Platyosprion.
