= Gwilymia =

Scientific classification
- Kingdom: Plantae
- Clade: Tracheophytes
- Clade: Angiosperms
- Clade: Eudicots
- Clade: Rosids
- Order: Fabales
- Family: Fabaceae
- Genus: Gwilymia; A.G.Lima, Paula-Souza & Scalon (2022)

Species
- Gwilymia coriacea (Benth.) A.G.Lima, Paula-Souza & Scalon; Gwilymia fissurata (E.M.O.Martins) A.G.Lima, Paula-Souza & Scalon; Gwilymia moricolor (Barneby & J.W.Grimes) A.G.Lima, Paula-Souza & Scalon; Gwilymia occhioniana (E.M.O.Martins) A.G.Lima, Paula-Souza & Scalon; Gwilymia paniculata (Poepp.) A.G.Lima, Paula-Souza & Scalon; Gwilymia polystachya (Miq.) A.G.Lima, Paula-Souza & Scalon; Gwilymia racemifera (Ducke) A.G.Lima, Paula-Souza & Scalon

Genus of flowering plants

Gwilymia is a genus of flowering plants in the pea family (Fabaceae). It includes seven species native to northern South America, from Colombia, Venezuela, and the Guianas to Bolivia and Brazil. The genus was described in an integrative study combining genomic and morphological data by legume experts Alexandre Gibau de Lima, Juliana Paula-Souza, and Viviane Scalon et al.

- Gwilymia coriacea (Benth.) A.G.Lima, Paula-Souza & Scalon – Brazil
- Gwilymia fissurata (E.M.O.Martins) A.G.Lima, Paula-Souza & Scalon – Bolivia and west-central Brazil
- Gwilymia moricolor (Barneby & J.W.Grimes) A.G.Lima, Paula-Souza & Scalon – the Guianas
- Gwilymia occhioniana (E.M.O.Martins) A.G.Lima, Paula-Souza & Scalon – northern Brazil
- Gwilymia paniculata (Poepp.) A.G.Lima, Paula-Souza & Scalon – southeastern Colombia and northern Brazil
- Gwilymia polystachya (Miq.) A.G.Lima, Paula-Souza & Scalon – Venezuela, the Guianas, and northern and northeastern Brazil
- Gwilymia racemifera (Ducke) A.G.Lima, Paula-Souza & Scalon – northern Brazil
