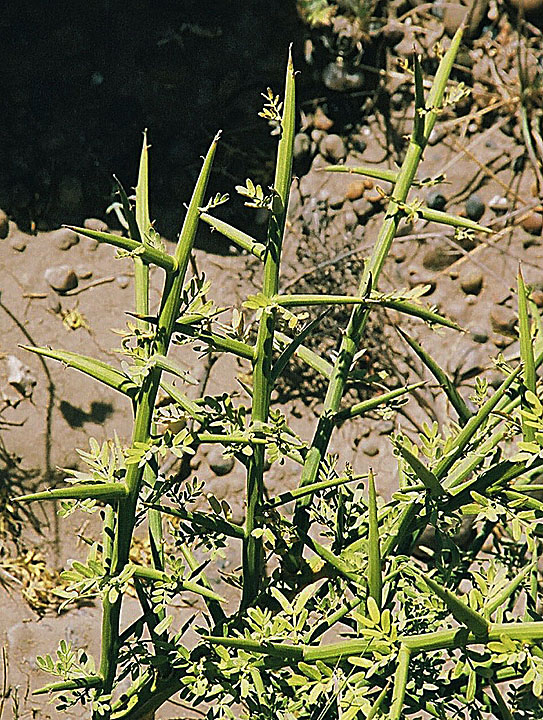
- Prosopidastrum globosum

Scientific classification
- Kingdom: Plantae
- Clade: Tracheophytes
- Clade: Angiosperms
- Clade: Eudicots
- Clade: Rosids
- Order: Fabales
- Family: Fabaceae
- Subfamily: Caesalpinioideae
- Clade: Mimosoid clade
- Genus: Prosopidastrum; Burkart (1964)

Species
- 7; see text

= Prosopidastrum =

Genus of legumes

Prosopidastrum is a genus of flowering plants in the family Fabaceae. It includes seven species of shrubs native to the subtropical Americas, with six species native to Bolivia and Argentina, and one (Prosopidastrum mexicanum) native to Baja California. They grow in subtropical xerophytic bushland, thicket, grassland, and semi-desert. It belongs to the mimosoid clade of the subfamily Caesalpinioideae.

== Species ==
- Prosopidastrum angusticarpum R.A.Palacios & Hoc
- Prosopidastrum benthamii (Chodat & Wilczek) R.A.Palacios & Hoc
- Prosopidastrum dehiscens R.A.Palacios & Hoc
- Prosopidastrum globosum (Gillies ex Hook. & Arn.) Burkart
- Prosopidastrum gracile R.A.Palacios & Hoc
- Prosopidastrum mexicanum (Dressler) Burkart
- Prosopidastrum striatum (Benth.) R.A.Palacios & Hoc
