= Pseudosenegalia =

Scientific classification
- Kingdom: Plantae
- Clade: Tracheophytes
- Clade: Angiosperms
- Clade: Eudicots
- Clade: Rosids
- Order: Fabales
- Family: Fabaceae
- Subfamily: Caesalpinioideae
- Clade: Mimosoid clade
- Genus: Pseudosenegalia; Seigler & Ebinger, 2017

Type species
- Pseudosenegalia feddeana (Harms, 1920) Seigler & Ebinger, 2017

Species
- 2; see text

Genus of legumes

Pseudosenegalia is a small genus of flowering plants in the legume family, Fabaceae. It includes two species of trees or shrubs endemic to Bolivia. It belongs to subfamily Mimosoideae.

== Species list ==
The genus Pseudosenegalia comprises the following species:

- Pseudosenegalia feddeana (Harms) Seigler & Ebinger (2017)
- Pseudosenegalia riograndensis (Atahuahi & L.Rico) Seigler & Ebinger (2017)

== See also ==
- Acacia
- Acaciella
- Mariosousa
- Parasenegalia
- Senegalia
- Vachellia
