= Naiadendron =

Conservation status
- Least Concern (IUCN 3.1)

Scientific classification
- Kingdom: Plantae
- Clade: Tracheophytes
- Clade: Angiosperms
- Clade: Eudicots
- Clade: Rosids
- Order: Fabales
- Family: Fabaceae
- Genus: Naiadendron; A.G.Lima, Paula-Souza & Scalon (2022)
- Species: N. duckeanum

Binomial name
- Naiadendron duckeanum (Occhioni) A.G.Lima, Paula-Souza & Scalon (2022)

Synonyms
- Stryphnodendron duckeanum Occhioni (1959)

Genus of flowering plants

Naiadendron duckeanum is a species of flowering plant in the legume family, Fabaceae. It is a tree endemic to northern Brazil, where it grows in moist tropical lowland forest. It is the sole species in the genus Naiadendron. The genus was described in an integrative study combining genomic and morphological data by legume experts Alexandre Gibau de Lima, Juliana Paula-Souza, and Viviane Scalon et al..
