= Blanchetiodendron =

Scientific classification
- Kingdom: Plantae
- Clade: Tracheophytes
- Clade: Angiosperms
- Clade: Eudicots
- Clade: Rosids
- Order: Fabales
- Family: Fabaceae
- Subfamily: Caesalpinioideae
- Clade: Mimosoid clade
- Genus: Blanchetiodendron; Barneby & J.W.Grimes (1996)
- Species: B. blanchetii

Binomial name
- Blanchetiodendron blanchetii (Benth.) Barneby & J.W.Grimes (1996)

Synonyms
- Albizia blanchetii (Benth.) G.J.Lewis (1987); Enterolobium blanchetii Benth. (1844); Feuilleea incerta Kuntze (1891); Pithecellobium blanchetii (Benth.) Benth. (1875)

Genus of legumes

Blanchetiodendron is a genus of flowering plants in the family Fabaceae. It belongs to the mimosoid clade of the subfamily Caesalpinioideae. It contains a single species, Blanchetiodendron blanchetii, a shrub endemic to eastern Brazil. It ranges from Bahia to northeastern Minas Gerais states.
