= Piptadeniopsis =

Scientific classification
- Kingdom: Plantae
- Clade: Tracheophytes
- Clade: Angiosperms
- Clade: Eudicots
- Clade: Rosids
- Order: Fabales
- Family: Fabaceae
- Subfamily: Caesalpinioideae
- Clade: Mimosoid clade
- Genus: Piptadeniopsis; Burkart (1944)
- Species: P. lomentifera

Binomial name
- Piptadeniopsis lomentifera Burkart (1944)

Genus of legumes

Piptadeniopsis lomentifera is a species of flowering plant in the legume family, Fabaceae. It is a tree native to southwestern Bolivia and Paraguay. It is the sole species in genus Piptadeniopsis. It belongs to the mimosoid clade of the subfamily Caesalpinioideae.
