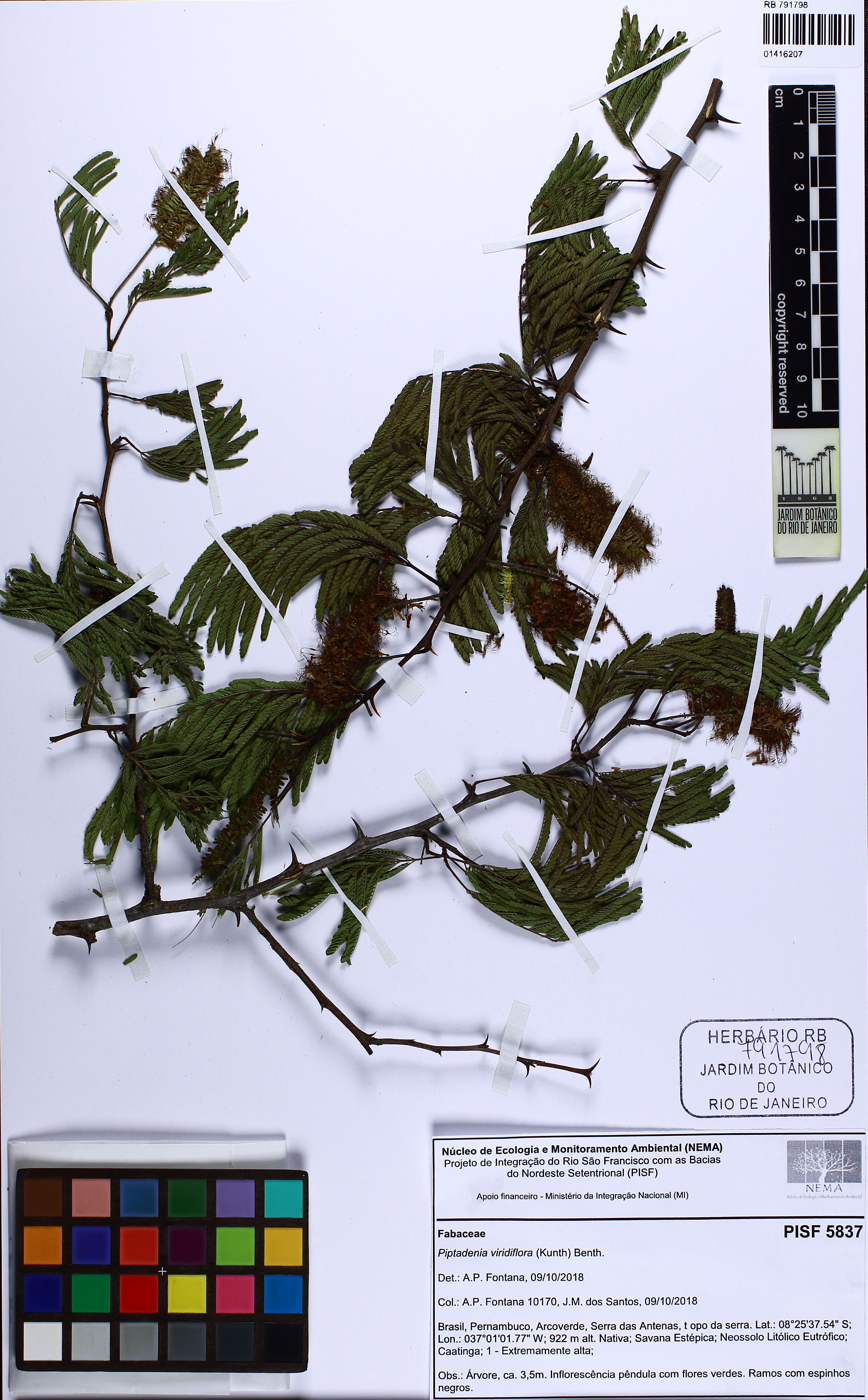

Scientific classification
- Kingdom: Plantae
- Clade: Tracheophytes
- Clade: Angiosperms
- Clade: Eudicots
- Clade: Rosids
- Order: Fabales
- Family: Fabaceae
- Genus: Lachesiodendron; P.G.Ribeiro, L.P.Queiroz & Luckow (2018)
- Species: L. viridiflorum

Binomial name
- Lachesiodendron viridiflorum (Kunth) P.G.Ribeiro, L.P.Queiroz & Luckow (2018)

Synonyms
- Acacia ampeloclada Rusby (1927); Acacia subtilifolia Kunth (1824); Acacia viridiflora Kunth (1821); Piptadenia viridiflora (Kunth) Benth. (1841); Piptadenia biuncifera Benth. (1841); Piptadenia rubescens Pittier (1927); Piptadenia speciosa Britton & Killip (1936); Piptadenia subtilifolia Benth. (1841); Pityrocarpa viridiflora (Kunth) Brenan (1955)

= Lachesiodendron =

Genus of plants

Lachesiodendron viridiflorum is a species of flowering plant in the legume family, Fabaceae. It is the sole species in genus Lachesiodendron. It is a tree native to the tropical Americas, native to central and southern Mexico and northern South America – Venezuela, Colombia, Peru, Bolivia, and west-central and eastern Brazil. Habitats include tropical forest and woodland, savanna, shrubland, and grassland.
