= Antopetitia =

Scientific classification
- Kingdom: Plantae
- Clade: Tracheophytes
- Clade: Angiosperms
- Clade: Eudicots
- Clade: Rosids
- Order: Fabales
- Family: Fabaceae
- Genus: Antopetitia; A.Rich. (1840)
- Species: A. abyssinica

Binomial name
- Antopetitia abyssinica A.Rich. (1840)

Synonyms
- Ornithopodium coriandrinum (Hochst. & Steud. ex Fielding & Gardner) Kuntze (1891); Ornithopus coriandrinus Hochst. & Steud. ex Fielding & Gardner (1844)

Genus of legumes

Antopetitia is a genus of flowering plants in the legume family, Fabaceae. It contains a single species, Antopetitia abyssinica, an herbaceous annual native to sub-Saharan Africa, ranging from Nigeria to Eritrea and Mozambique. It belongs to the subfamily Faboideae.

Members within the genus bear odd-pinnately compound leaves with five to eleven leaflets. Stipules are reduced to glands. Inflorescences are pedunculate umbels borne in axillae. Flowers each have a gamosepalous but toothed calyx and a corolla of petals each divided into a claw and limb of equal or near-equal length. Each fruit consists of two to five one-seeded segments, each of which dehisce into two valves upon maturity.
