= Neocollettia =

Scientific classification
- Kingdom: Plantae
- Clade: Tracheophytes
- Clade: Angiosperms
- Clade: Eudicots
- Clade: Rosids
- Order: Fabales
- Family: Fabaceae
- Subfamily: Faboideae
- Genus: Neocollettia; Hemsl. (1890)
- Species: N. wallichii

Binomial name
- Neocollettia wallichii (Kurz) Schindl. (1925)

Synonyms
- Neocollettia gracilis Hemsl. (1890); Teramnus wallichii Kurz (1876)

Genus of legumes

Neocollettia is a genus of flowering plants in the legume family, Fabaceae. It includes a single species, Neocollettia wallichii, a perennial native to Myanmar and Java. It belongs to the subfamily Faboideae.
