= Chidlowia =

Scientific classification
- Kingdom: Plantae
- Clade: Tracheophytes
- Clade: Angiosperms
- Clade: Eudicots
- Clade: Rosids
- Order: Fabales
- Family: Fabaceae
- Subfamily: Caesalpinioideae
- Clade: Mimosoid clade
- Genus: Chidlowia; Hoyle (1932)
- Species: C. sanguinea

Binomial name
- Chidlowia sanguinea Hoyle (1932)

Genus of legumes

Chidlowia is a genus of flowering plants in the family Fabaceae. It belongs to the mimosoid clade of the subfamily Caesalpinioideae. It contains a single species, Chidlowia sanguinea, a tree native to West Africa (Guinea, Sierra Leone, Liberia, Côte d'Ivoire, and Ghana) and Chad.
