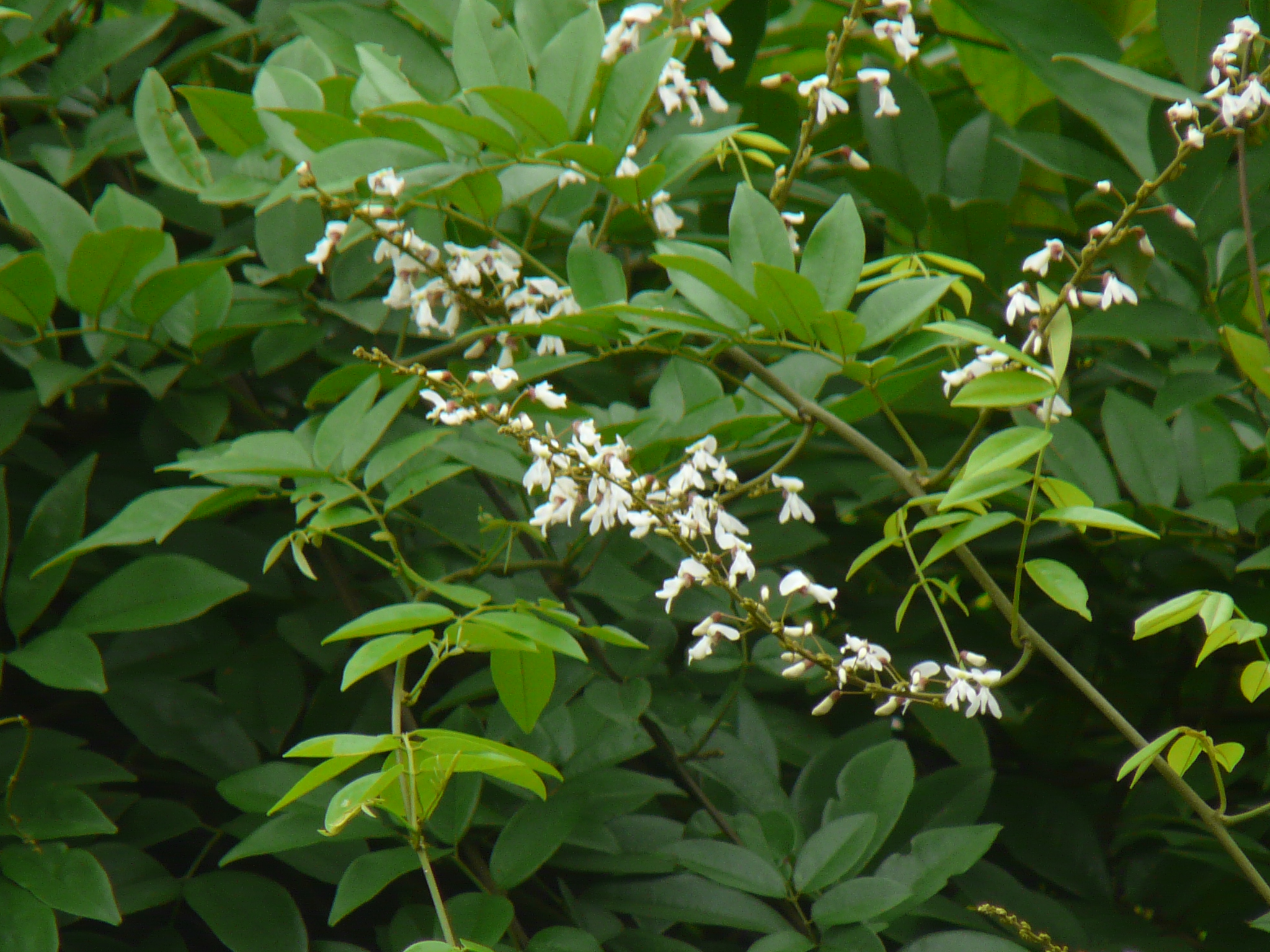
- Brachypterum scandens

Scientific classification
- Kingdom: Plantae
- Clade: Embryophytes
- Clade: Tracheophytes
- Clade: Angiosperms
- Clade: Eudicots
- Clade: Rosids
- Order: Fabales
- Family: Fabaceae
- Genus: Brachypterum (Wight & Arn.) Benth., nom. cons.

Synonyms
- Solori Adans., nom. rej.

= Brachypterum =

Genus of plants

Brachypterum is a genus of flowering plants in the pea family (Fabaceae). It includes 13 species, which range from the Indian Subcontinent through Southeast Asia to eastern Australia.

== Species ==
As of October 2025, Plants of the World Online accepts the following 13 species:

- Brachypterum cumingii (Benth.) Adema & Sirich. – Philippines
- Brachypterum eriocarpum (F.C.How) Adema & Sirich. – eastern Assam to Myanmar, southern China, Laos, and Vietnam
- Brachypterum involutum (Sprague) Adema & Sirich. – Queensland and northeastern New South Wales
- Brachypterum koolgibberah (F.M.Bailey) Adema & Sirich. – New Guinea and Queensland (Cook region)
- Brachypterum microphyllum Miq. – Indochina, Peninsular Malaysia, and Sumatra
- Brachypterum nitidum W.E.Cooper – Cape York Peninsula (Queensland)
- Brachypterum opacum W.E.Cooper – northeastern Queensland
- Brachypterum philippinense (Merr.) Adema & Sirich. – Philippines
- Brachypterum pseudinvolutum (Verdc.) Adema & Sirich. – New Guinea
- Brachypterum robustum (Roxb. ex DC.) Dalzell & A.Gibson – India, Indochina, southern China, Sumatra, Java, and Sulawesi
- Brachypterum scandens (Roxb.) Wight & Arn. ex Miq. – India, Indochina, south-central China, Malesia, New Guinea, Queensland, and New South Wales
- Brachypterum submontanum (Verdc.) Adema & Sirich. – eastern New Guinea
- Brachypterum thorelii (Gagnep.) Adema & Sirich. – Laos and northern and northeastern Thailand
