= Pseudolotus =

Scientific classification
- Kingdom: Plantae
- Clade: Tracheophytes
- Clade: Angiosperms
- Clade: Eudicots
- Clade: Rosids
- Order: Fabales
- Family: Fabaceae
- Genus: Pseudolotus; Rech.f. (1958)
- Species: P. villosus

Binomial name
- Pseudolotus villosus (Blatt. & Hallb.) Ali & D.D.Sokoloff (2001)

Synonyms
- Dorycnium villosum Blatt. & Hallb. (1919); Lotus makranicus Rech.f. & Esfand. (1951); Pseudolotus makranicus (Rech.f. & Esfand.) Rech.f. (1958)

Genus of plants

Pseudolotus is a monotypic genus of flowering plants belonging to the legume family, Fabaceae. The only species is Pseudolotus villosus.

It is a perennial or annual herb native to the eastern Arabian Peninsula (Gulf states and Oman), Iran, and Pakistan. It grows in desert and dry shrubland habitats.
