= Delgadoana =

Scientific classification
- Kingdom: Plantae
- Clade: Tracheophytes
- Clade: Angiosperms
- Clade: Eudicots
- Clade: Rosids
- Order: Fabales
- Family: Fabaceae
- Subfamily: Faboideae
- Tribe: Phaseoleae
- Subtribe: Phaseolinae
- Genus: Delgadoana; U.B.Deshmukh, M.B.Shende, E.S.Reddy & Mungole
- Species: D. bambuicola

Binomial name
- Delgadoana bambuicola (F.S.Santos, Snak & L.P.Queiroz) U.B.Deshmukh, M.B.Shende, E.S.Reddy & Mungole

Synonyms
- Delgadoa F.S.Santos, Snak & L.P.Queiroz (2022), non Delgadoa Heer, fossil genus; Delgadoa bambuicola F.S.Santos, Snak & L.P.Queiroz (species basionym)

Genus of flowering plants

Delgadoana is a genus of flowering plants in the family Fabaceae. It includes a single species, Delgadoana bambuicola, a woody liana native to Bahia state in northeastern Brazil.

The species was first described as Delgadoa bambuicola in 2022 by Felipe da Silva Santos, Cristiane Snak, and Luciano Paganucci de Queiroz, who placed it in the newly described genus Delgadoa. Delgadoa is a fossil Pteridophyte genus previously described by Oswald Heer, and in 2023 Deshmukh, Shende, Reddy, and Mungole described a replacement genus name, Delgadoana, and placed the species there as Delgadoana bambuicola.

The genus name honors Dr. Alfonso Delgado Salinas, a Mexican botanist who studied the systematics of subtribe Phaseolinae.
