= Pityrocarpa =

Scientific classification
- Kingdom: Plantae
- Clade: Tracheophytes
- Clade: Angiosperms
- Clade: Eudicots
- Clade: Rosids
- Order: Fabales
- Family: Fabaceae
- Subfamily: Caesalpinioideae
- Clade: Mimosoid clade
- Genus: Pityrocarpa (Benth. & Hook.f.) Britton & Rose (1928)

Species
- 7; see text

Synonyms
- Monoschisma Brenan (1955), nom. illeg.; Piptadenia sect. Pityrocarpa Benth. & Hook.f. (1875); Pseudopiptadenia Rauschert (1982)

Genus of legumes

Pityrocarpa is a genus of flowering plants in the family Fabaceae. It includes seven species of shrubs and small trees native to the tropical Americas, including western and southeastern Mexico, Guatemala and El Salvador, Venezuela and Guyana, Bolivia, and eastern Brazil. Native habitats include tropical coastal rain forest, gallery forest, secondary forest, woodland, wooded grassland (Cerrado), and thorn scrub (Caatinga). It belongs to the mimosoid clade of the subfamily Caesalpinioideae.

- Pityrocarpa brenanii (G.P.Lewis & M.P.Lima) L.P.Queiroz & L.M.Borges
- Pityrocarpa inaequalis (Benth.) L.P.Queiroz & Marc.F.Simon
- Pityrocarpa leptostachya (Benth.) L.P.Queiroz & P.G.Ribeiro
- Pityrocarpa leucoxylon (Barneby & J.W.Grimes) Luckow & R.W.Jobson
- Pityrocarpa moniliformis (Benth.) Luckow & R.W.Jobson
- Pityrocarpa obliqua (Pers.) Brenan
- Pityrocarpa schumanniana (Taub.) L.P.Queiroz & L.M.Borges
