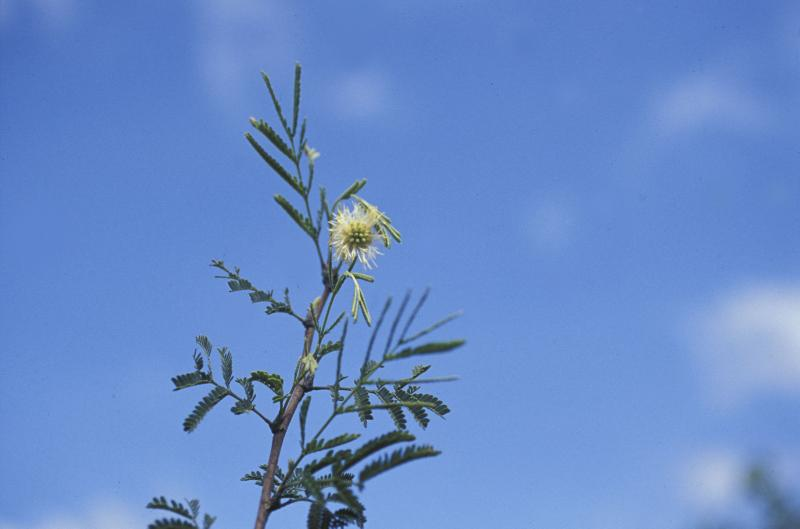
- Alantsilodendron humbertii

Scientific classification
- Kingdom: Plantae
- Clade: Tracheophytes
- Clade: Angiosperms
- Clade: Eudicots
- Clade: Rosids
- Order: Fabales
- Family: Fabaceae
- Subfamily: Caesalpinioideae
- Clade: Mimosoid clade
- Genus: Alantsilodendron; Villiers (1994)

Species
- nine; see text

= Alantsilodendron =

Genus of legumes

Alantsilodendron is a genus of flowering plants in the legume family, Fabaceae. It belongs to the mimosoid clade of the subfamily Caesalpinioideae. It contains nine species, which are endemic to Madagascar.

- Alantsilodendron alluaudianum (R.Vig.) Villiers
- Alantsilodendron brevipes (R.Vig.) Villiers
- Alantsilodendron decaryanum (R.Vig.) Villiers
- Alantsilodendron glomeratum Villiers
- Alantsilodendron humbertii (R.Vig.) Villiers
- Alantsilodendron mahafalense (R.Vig.) Villiers
- Alantsilodendron pilosum Villiers
- Alantsilodendron ramosum Villiers
- Alantsilodendron villosum (R.Vig.) Villiers
