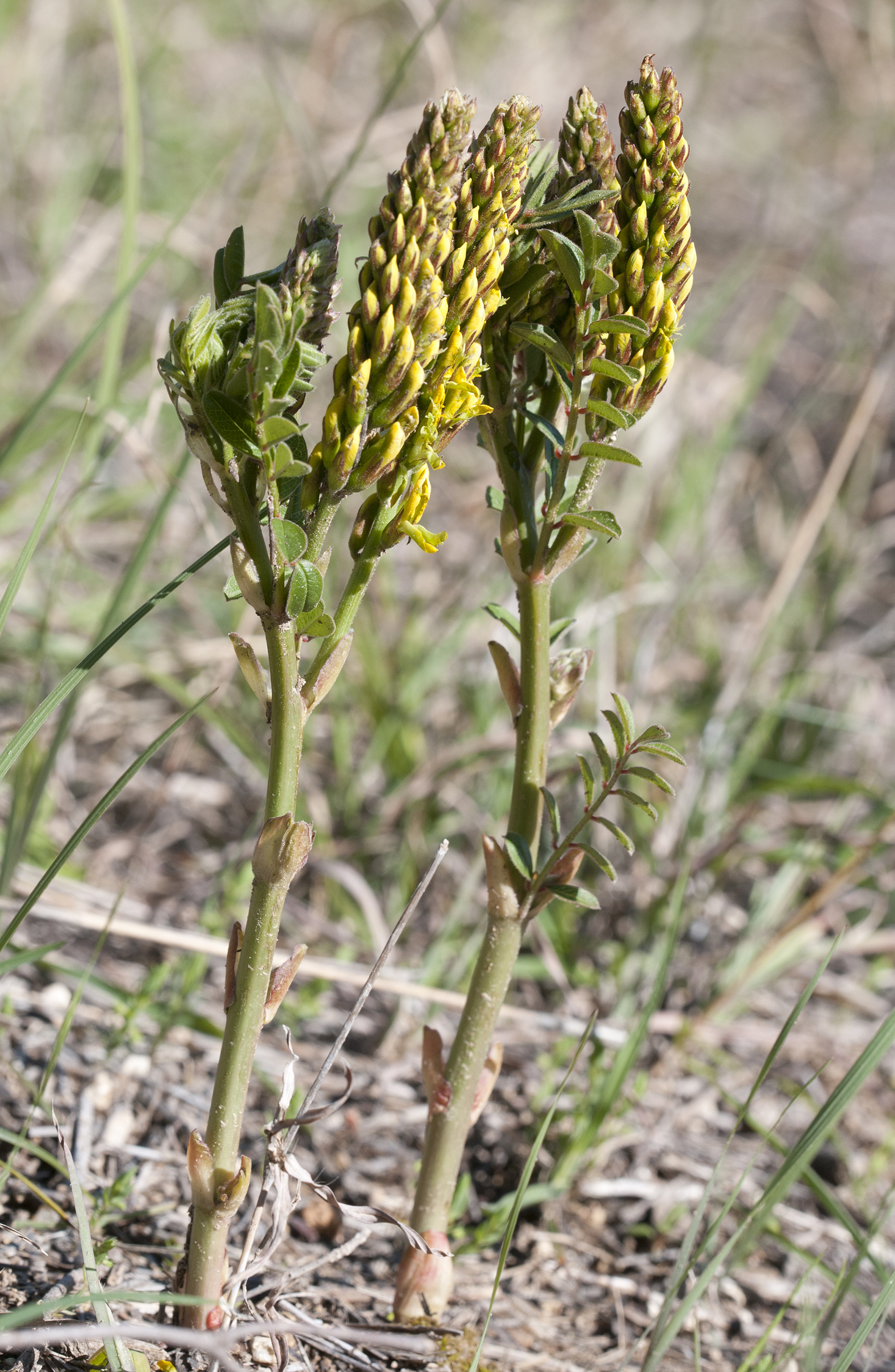

Scientific classification
- Kingdom: Plantae
- Clade: Tracheophytes
- Clade: Angiosperms
- Clade: Eudicots
- Clade: Rosids
- Order: Fabales
- Family: Fabaceae
- Genus: Glycyrrhizopsis; Boiss. (1856)

Species
- Glycyrrhizopsis asymmetrica (Hub.-Mor.) L.Duan; Glycyrrhizopsis flavescens (Boiss.) Boiss.

= Glycyrrhizopsis =

Genus of flowering plants

Glycyrrhizopsis is a genus of flowering plants in the legume family Fabaceae, consisting of the two species Glycyrrhizopsis asymmetrica and Glycyrrhizopsis flavescens. Both are native to the eastern Mediterranean, with G. asymmetrica being mostly confined to southern Turkey while the range of G. flavescens additionally extends into Lebanon and Syria.
