= Podolotus =

Scientific classification
- Kingdom: Plantae
- Clade: Tracheophytes
- Clade: Angiosperms
- Clade: Eudicots
- Clade: Rosids
- Order: Fabales
- Family: Fabaceae
- Subfamily: Faboideae
- Genus: Podolotus; Royle ex Benth. (1835)
- Species: P. hosackioides

Binomial name
- Podolotus hosackioides Royle ex Benth. (1835)

Synonyms
- Astragalus hosackioides (Royle ex Benth.) Benth. ex Baker (1876); Kerstania Rech.f. (1958); Kerstania nuristanica Rech.f. (1958); Lotus hosackioides (Royle ex Benth.) Ali (1994); Tragacantha hosackioides (Royle ex Benth.) Kuntze (1891)

Genus of legumes

Podolotus hosackioides is a species of flowering plant in the legume family, Fabaceae. It is an herbaceous perennial native to western Asia, ranging from the Oman on the Arabian Peninsula through Iran and Afghanistan to the western Himalayas. It is the sole species in genus Podolotus. It belongs to subfamily Faboideae.
