= Desmodiopsis =

Scientific classification
- Kingdom: Plantae
- Clade: Tracheophytes
- Clade: Angiosperms
- Clade: Eudicots
- Clade: Rosids
- Order: Fabales
- Family: Fabaceae
- Genus: Desmodiopsis (Schindl.) H.Ohashi & K.Ohashi (2018)
- Species: D. camplyocaulon

Binomial name
- Desmodiopsis camplyocaulon (F.Muell. ex Benth.) H.Ohashi & K.Ohashi (2018)

Synonyms
- Alysicarpus campylocaulis (F.Muell. ex Benth.) Schindl. (1925); Desmodium campylocaulon F.Muell. ex Benth. (1864); Meibomia campylocaula (F.Muell. ex Benth.) Kuntze (1891)

Genus of flowering plants

Desmodiopsis is a genus of plants in the pea family (Fabaceae). It contains a single species, Desmodiopsis camplyocaulon, a perennial or subshrub native to northern and eastern Australia.
