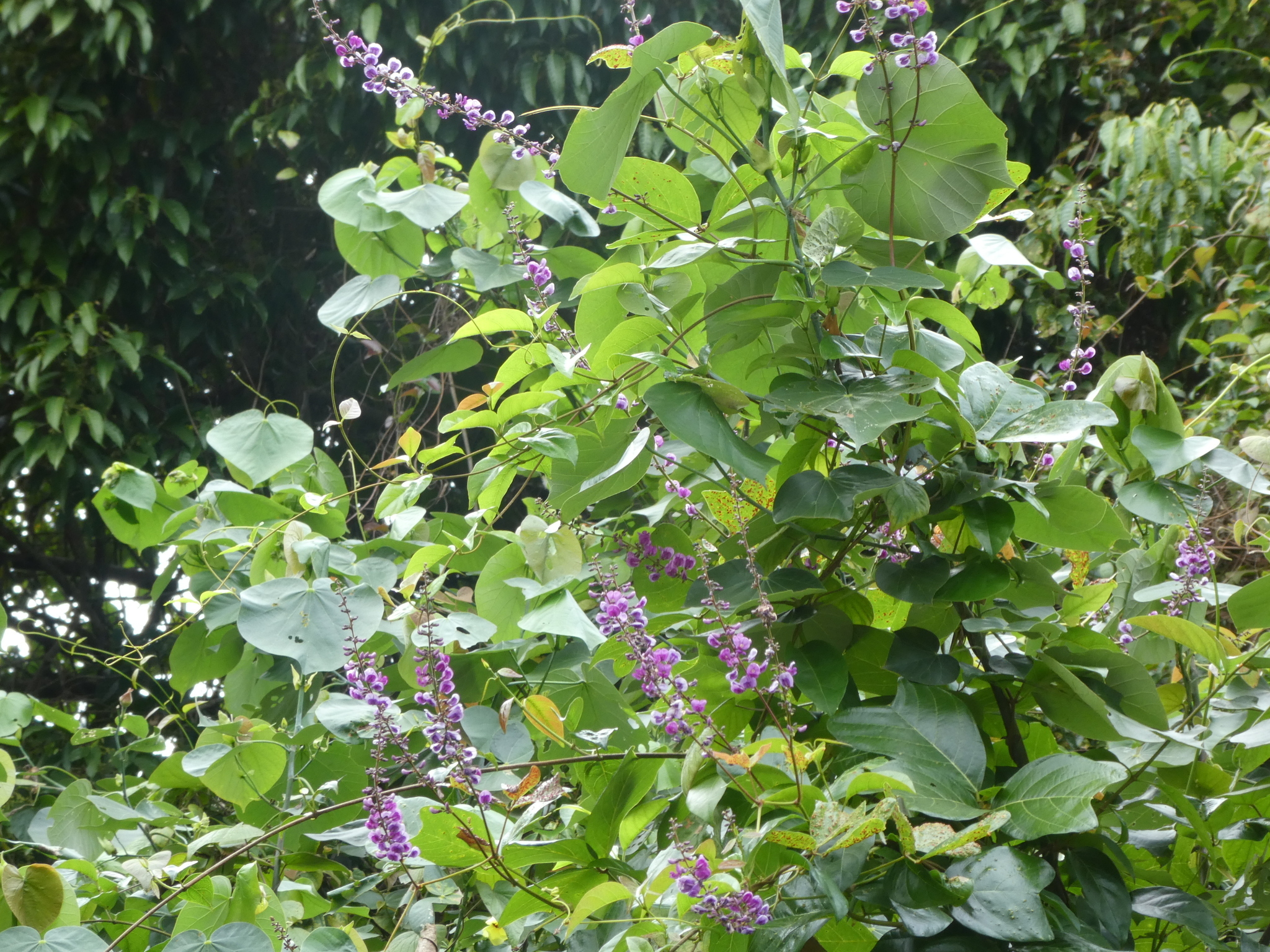

Scientific classification
- Kingdom: Plantae
- Clade: Tracheophytes
- Clade: Angiosperms
- Clade: Eudicots
- Clade: Rosids
- Order: Fabales
- Family: Fabaceae
- Subfamily: Faboideae
- Subtribe: Kennediinae
- Genus: Vandasina; Rauschert (1982)
- Species: V. retusa

Binomial name
- Vandasina retusa (Benth.) Rauschert (1982)

Synonyms
- Vandasia Domin (1926); Caulinia retusa (Benth.) F.Muell. (1871); Dolichos obcordatus A.Cunn. ex Benth. (1864), not validly publ.; Glycine retusa Sol. ex Benth. (1864), not validly publ.; Hardenbergia retusa Benth. (1864); Kennedia retusa (Benth.) F.Muell. (1866); Vandasia retusa Domin (1926)

= Vandasina =

Genus of legumes

Vandasina is a monotypic genus—that is, a genus that includes only one known species—of plants in the legume family, Fabaceae, subfamily Faboideae. The sole included species is Vandasina retusa (Benth.) Rauschert

It is a climbing shrub native to the island of New Guinea and Queensland (in Australia).

The genus and species were both first published in Taxon Vol.31 on page 559 in 1982.

The genus name of Vandasina is in honour of Karel (Karl) Vandas (1861–1923), who was a (Bohemian-) Czech Botanist and teacher, who taught in Prague and was Professor of Agriculture and forestry at the Technical College in Brno.
