= Betencourtia =

Scientific classification
- Kingdom: Plantae
- Clade: Tracheophytes
- Clade: Angiosperms
- Clade: Eudicots
- Clade: Rosids
- Order: Fabales
- Family: Fabaceae
- Genus: Betencourtia; A.St.-Hil. (1833)

Species
- eight; see text

Genus of flowering plants

Betencourtia is a genus of plants in the pea family (Fabaceae). It includes eight species native to South America, ranging from Colombia and Venezuela through Brazil to Bolivia, Paraguay, Uruguay, and northeastern Argentina.

== Species ==
Eight species are accepted:

- Betencourtia australis (Malme) L.P.Queiroz – southern Brazil, Paraguay, Uruguay, and northeastern Argentina
- Betencourtia crassifolia (Benth.) L.P.Queiroz – Bolivia and west-central and eastern Brazil
- Betencourtia gracillima (Benth.) L.P.Queiroz – Colombia and Venezuela, and west-central, southeastern, and southern Brazil, Paraguay, Uruguay, and northeastern Argentina
- Betencourtia martii (DC.) L.P.Queiroz – eastern Brazil
- Betencourtia martioides (Burkart) L.P.Queiroz – southern Brazil, northeastern Argentina, and Uruguay
- Betencourtia neesii (DC.) L.P.Queiroz – eastern, west-central, and southern Brazil, Paraguay, and northeastern Argentina
- Betencourtia scarlatina (Mart. ex Benth.) L.P.Queiroz – Brazil, Paraguay, and northeastern Argentina
- Betencourtia stereophylla (Harms) L.P.Queiroz – west-central and southeastern Brazil
