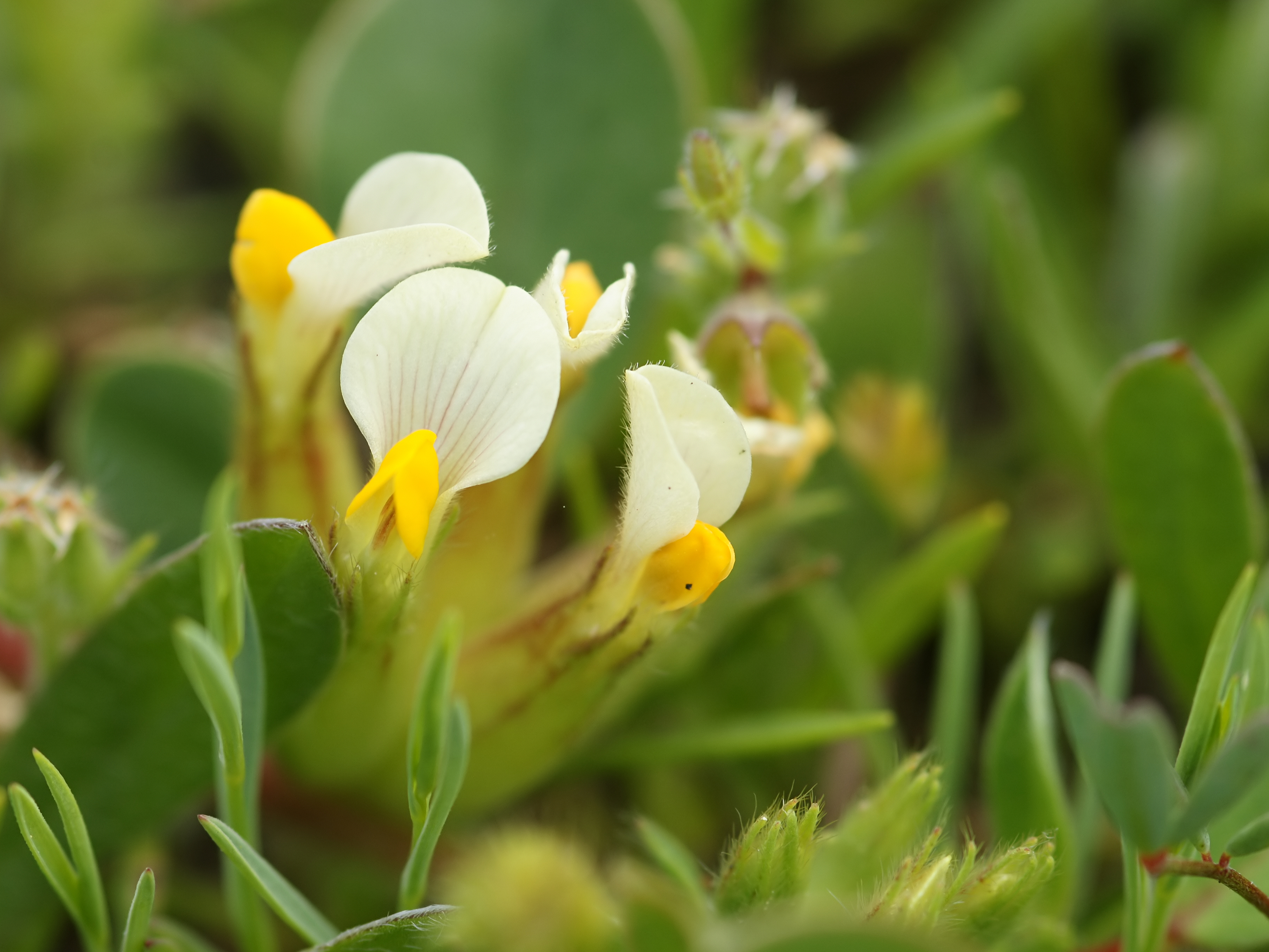

Scientific classification
- Kingdom: Plantae
- Clade: Tracheophytes
- Clade: Angiosperms
- Clade: Eudicots
- Clade: Rosids
- Order: Fabales
- Family: Fabaceae
- Genus: Tripodion; Medik. (1787)
- Species: T. tetraphyllum

Binomial name
- Tripodion tetraphyllum (L.) Fourr. (1868)

Synonyms
- Physanthyllis Boiss. (1840); Anthyllis tetraphylla L. (1753); Physanthyllis tetraphylla (L.) Boiss. (1840); Tripodion lotoides Medik. (1787), nom. superfl.; Vulneraria tetraphylla (L.) Moench (1794)

= Tripodion =

Genus of legumes

Tripodion tetraphyllum is a species of flowering plant in the legume family, Fabaceae. It is an annual herb, commonly known as annual kidney vetch, native to the Mediterranean Basin of southern Europe, North Africa, and western Asia. It grows in the Mediterranean–Sahara transition zone of North Africa, and in anthropic landscapes. It is the sole species in genus Tripodion, which belongs to subfamily Faboideae.

The plants have a self-supporting growth form and compound, broad leaves. Individuals can grow to 0.2 m.

== Sources ==
This article incorporates text from a free content work. Licensed under CC0 (license statement/permission). Text taken from Tripodion tetraphyllum. Encyclopedia of Life.
