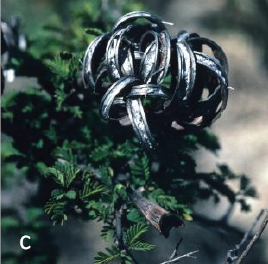
- Pod of C. nervosa

Scientific classification
- Kingdom: Plantae
- Clade: Tracheophytes
- Clade: Angiosperms
- Clade: Eudicots
- Clade: Rosids
- Order: Fabales
- Family: Fabaceae
- Subfamily: Caesalpinioideae
- Clade: Mimosoid clade
- Genus: Calliandropsis; H.M.Hern. & Guinet (1990)
- Species: C. nervosa

Binomial name
- Calliandropsis nervosa (Britton & Rose) H.M.Hern. & Guinet (1990)

Synonyms
- Anneslia nervosa Britton & Rose (1928); Desmanthus nervosus (Britton & Rose) Rudd (1966)

= Calliandropsis =

Genus of legumes

Calliandropsis is a genus of flowering plants in the family Fabaceae. It contains a single species, Calliandropsis nervosa, a shrub native to northeastern, central, and southern Mexico (Durango to Oaxaca). It belongs to the mimosoid clade of the subfamily Caesalpinioideae.
