= Cylicodiscus =

Scientific classification
- Kingdom: Plantae
- Clade: Tracheophytes
- Clade: Angiosperms
- Clade: Eudicots
- Clade: Rosids
- Order: Fabales
- Family: Fabaceae
- Subfamily: Caesalpinioideae
- Clade: Mimosoid clade
- Genus: Cylicodiscus; Harms (1897)
- Species: C. gabunensis

Binomial name
- Cylicodiscus gabunensis Harms (1897)

Synonyms
- Cyrtoxiphus Harms (1897); Cyrtoxiphus staudtii Harms (1897); Erythrophleum gabunense Taub. (1894), nom. nud.; Piptadenia gabunensis (Harms) Roberty (1954)

Genus of legumes

Cylicodiscus is a genus of flowering plants in the family Fabaceae. It includes a single species, Cylicodiscus gabunensis, a tree native to the rain forests of western and west-central Africa, ranging from Côte d'Ivoire to Central African Republic and Republic of the Congo.

Cylicodiscus gabunensis is a very large tree, reaching 200 feet (61 m) in height and 37 feet (11 m) in girth. Trees are armed with thorns as saplings and unarmed as adults. Flowers are yellowish or greenish-white and arranged on spikes. Fruits are pods up to 3 feet (0.91 m) long. Seeds are flat, thinky winged, and up to 3 inches (7.6 cm) long.

The genus belongs to the mimosoid clade of the subfamily Caesalpinioideae.
