= Huchimingia =

Scientific classification
- Kingdom: Plantae
- Clade: Tracheophytes
- Clade: Angiosperms
- Clade: Eudicots
- Clade: Rosids
- Order: Fabales
- Family: Fabaceae
- Genus: Huchimingia; Z.Q.Song & Shi J.Li (2022)

Species
- Huchimingia ichthyochtona (Drake) Z.Q.Song; Huchimingia piscidia (Roxb.) Z.Q.Song; Huchimingia podocarpa (Dunn) Z.Q.Song; Huchimingia trifoliata (Dunn) Z.Q.Song; Huchimingia weizhii (Z.Q.Song) Z.Q.Song

Genus of plants

Huchimingia is a genus of flowering plants in the legume family, Fabaceae. It includes five species native to southeastern Asia, ranging from the eastern Himalayas to Indochina and south-central China.
