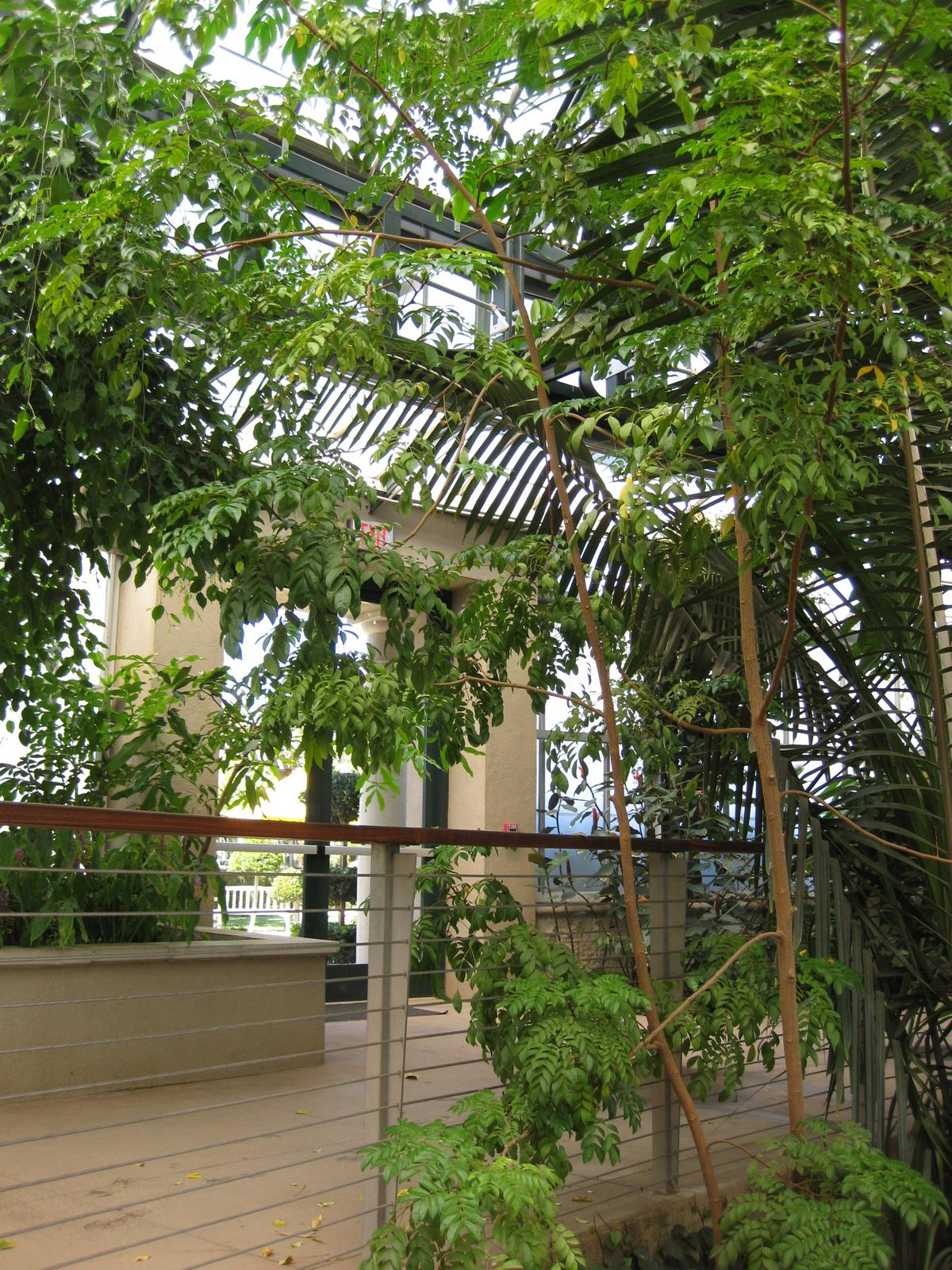
- Wallaceodendron celebicum in greenhouse at Huntington Gardens

Conservation status
- Near Threatened (IUCN 3.1)

Scientific classification
- Kingdom: Plantae
- Clade: Tracheophytes
- Clade: Angiosperms
- Clade: Eudicots
- Clade: Rosids
- Order: Fabales
- Family: Fabaceae
- Subfamily: Caesalpinioideae
- Clade: Mimosoid clade
- Genus: Wallaceodendron; Koord.
- Species: W. celebicum

Binomial name
- Wallaceodendron celebicum Koord.

Synonyms
- Pithecellobium williamsii Elmer

= Wallaceodendron =

Genus of legumes

Wallaceodendron celebicum is species of flowering plant in the legume family, Fabaceae. It is a tree native to the Philippines and Sulawesi. Typical habitat is tropical coastal and inland rain forest from sea level to 850 meters elevation. It is the sole species in genus Wallaceodendron. The genus belongs to the mimosoid clade of the subfamily Caesalpinioideae.

Timber from the tree, known as banúyo (ironwood) or derham mahogany, is used for furniture, cabinet making, and flooring.
