= Lemurodendron =

Scientific classification
- Kingdom: Plantae
- Clade: Tracheophytes
- Clade: Angiosperms
- Clade: Eudicots
- Clade: Rosids
- Order: Fabales
- Family: Fabaceae
- Subfamily: Caesalpinioideae
- Clade: Mimosoid clade
- Genus: Lemurodendron; Villiers & P.Guinet (1989)
- Species: L. capuronii

Binomial name
- Lemurodendron capuronii Villiers & P.Guinet (1989)

Genus of legumes

Lemurodendron is a genus of flowering plants in the legume family, Fabaceae. It contains a single species, Lemurodendron capuronii, a tree endemic to Madagascar. It belongs to the mimosoid clade in the subfamily Caesalpinioideae.
