= Diptychandra =

Scientific classification
- Kingdom: Plantae
- Clade: Embryophytes
- Clade: Tracheophytes
- Clade: Spermatophytes
- Clade: Angiosperms
- Clade: Eudicots
- Clade: Rosids
- Order: Fabales
- Family: Fabaceae
- Subfamily: Caesalpinioideae
- Genus: Diptychandra; Tul. (1843)

Species
- Diptychandra aurantiaca (Mart.) Tul.; Diptychandra granadillo C.Romero & Arbeláez

Genus of legumes

Diptychandra is a genus of flowering plants in the legume family, Fabaceae. It belongs to the subfamily Caesalpinioideae. It includes two species native to northern South America, ranging from Colombia to Bolivia, Paraguay, and southeastern Brazil.
