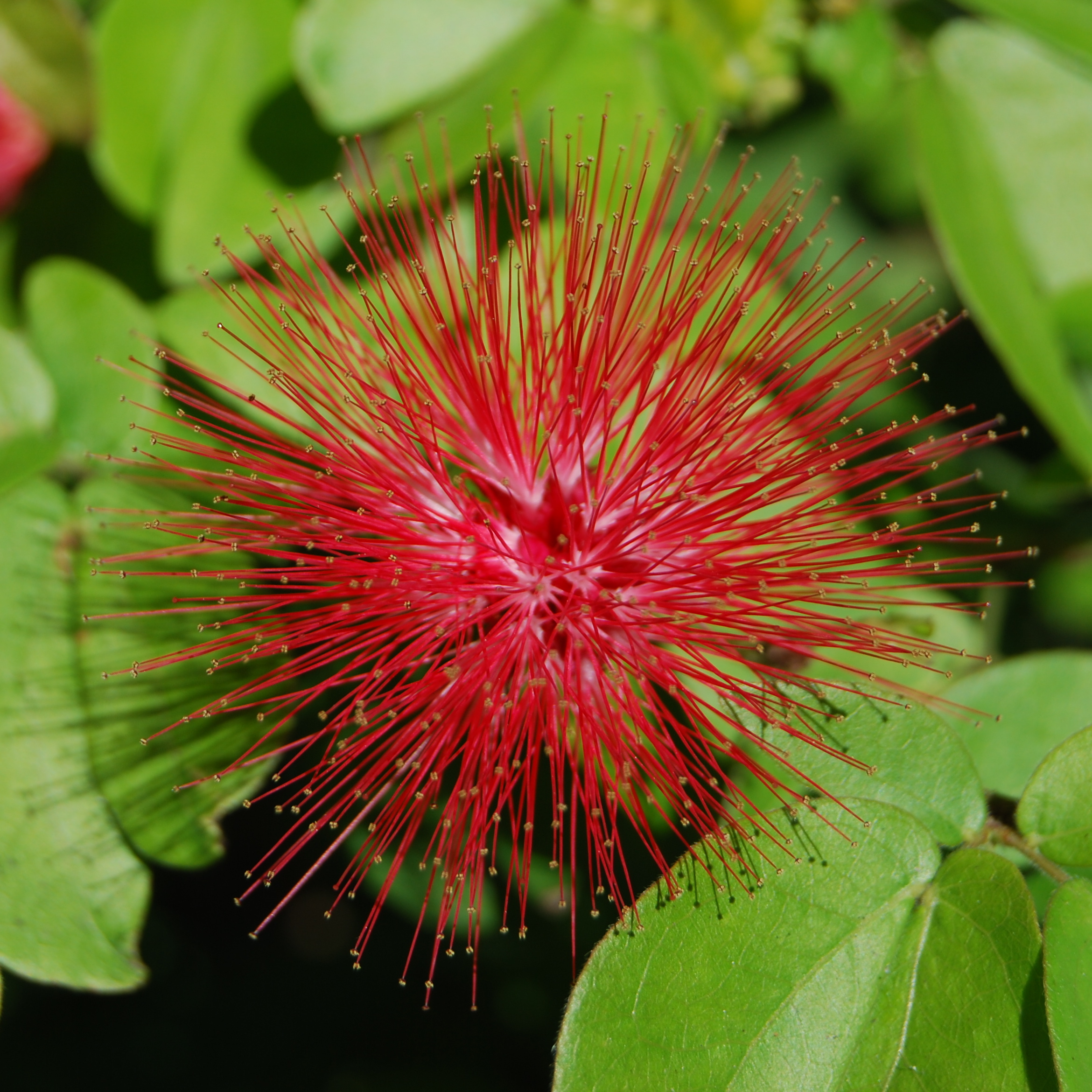
- Calliandra emarginata

Scientific classification
- Kingdom: Plantae
- Clade: Embryophytes
- Clade: Tracheophytes
- Clade: Spermatophytes
- Clade: Angiosperms
- Clade: Eudicots
- Clade: Rosids
- Order: Fabales
- Family: Fabaceae
- Subfamily: Caesalpinioideae
- Clade: Mimosoid clade DC.

Informal groups
- See text
- Distribution of the Mimosoideae

Synonyms
- Acaciaceae E. Meyer; Mimosaceae R. Brown

= Mimosoideae =

Subfamily of legumes

The Mimosoideae are a traditional subfamily of trees, herbs, lianas, and shrubs in the pea family (Fabaceae) that mostly grow in tropical and subtropical climates. They are typically characterized by having radially symmetric flowers, with petals that are twice divided (valvate) in bud and possess numerous showy, prominent stamens.

Recent work on phylogenetic relationships has found that the Mimosoideae form a clade nested with subfamily Caesalpinioideae, and the most recent classification by The Legume Phylogeny Working Group refers to them as the Mimosoid clade within subfamily Caesalpinioideae. The group includes about 40 genera and 2,500 species.

== Taxonomy ==
Some classification systems, for example the Cronquist system, treat the Fabaceae in a narrow sense, raising the Mimisoideae to the rank of family as Mimosaceae. The Angiosperm Phylogeny Group treats Fabaceae in the broad sense. The Mimosoideae were historically subdivided into four tribes (Acacieae, Ingeae, Mimoseae, and Mimozygantheae). However, modern molecular phylogenetics has shown that these groupings were artificial. Several informal subgroups have been proposed, but not yet described formally as tribes. Additionally, the genus Acacia was recently segregated into five genera (Acacia sensu stricto, Acaciella, Mariosousa, Senegalia, and Vachellia).

=== Basal Mimosoideae ===
- Adenanthera group
  - Adenanthera L.
  - Amblygonocarpus Harms
  - Calpocalyx Harms
  - Pseudoprosopis Harms
  - Tetrapleura Benth.
  - Xylia Benth.
- Entada group
  - Elephantorrhiza Benth.
  - Entada Adans.
  - Piptadeniastrum Brenan
- Newtonia group
  - Fillaeopsis Harms
  - Indopiptadenia Brenan
  - Lemurodendron Villiers & P. Guinet
  - Newtonia Baill.
- Prosopis group
  - Neltuma Raf.
  - Prosopis L.
  - Xerocladia Harv.
- Mimozyganthus group
  - Mimozyganthus Burkart
  - Piptadeniopsis Burkart
  - Prosopidastrum Burkart
- Leucaena group
  - Desmanthus Willd.
  - Kanaloa Lorence & K.R.Wood
  - Leucaena Benth.
  - Schleinitzia Warb. ex Nevling & Niezgoda
- Dichrostachys group
  - Alantsilodendron Villiers
  - Calliandropsis H.M.Hern. & P.Guinet
  - Dichrostachys (DC.) Wight & Arn.
  - Gagnebina Neck. ex DC.
- Unassigned
  - Aubrevillea Pellegr.
  - Chidlowia Hoyle
  - Cylicodiscus Harms
  - Neptunia Lour
  - Pentaclethra Benth.
  - Plathymenia Benth.

=== Acacia Clade (Core Mimosoideae) ===
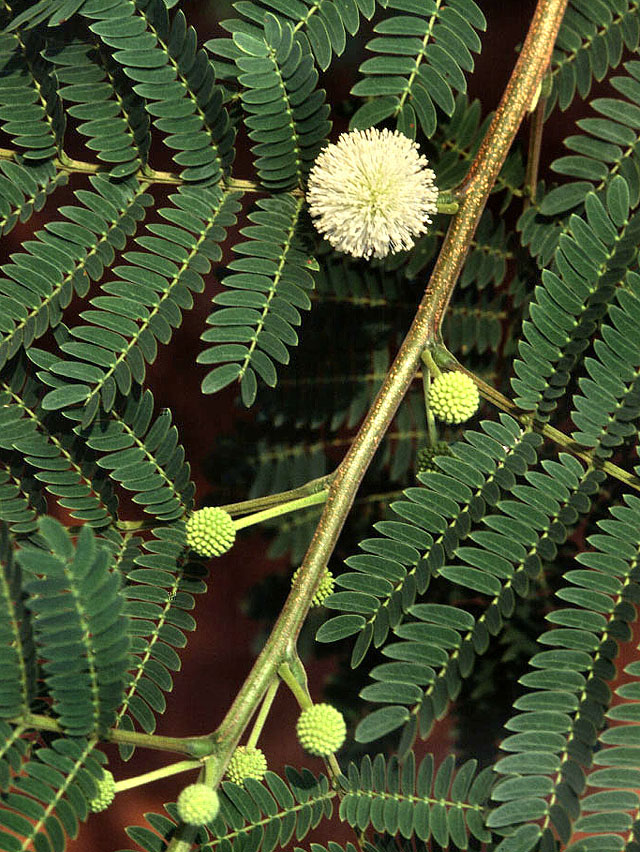
The lead tree, Leucaena leucocephala, is used for fiber and livestock fodder.

- Parkia group
  - Anadenanthera Speg.
  - Parkia R.Br.
- Piptadenia group
  - Adenopodia C.Presl
  - Microlobius C.Presl
  - Mimosa L.
  - Parapiptadenia Brenan
  - Piptadenia Benth.
  - Pityrocarpa Britton & Rose
  - Pseudopiptadenia Rauschert
  - Stryphnodendron Mart.
- Abarema group
  - Abarema Pittier
  - Balizia Barneby & J.W.Grimes
  - Hydrochorea Barneby & J.W.Grimes
- Ingeae grade (Paraphyletic)
  - Acaciella Britton & Rose
  - Afrocalliandra E.R. Souza & L.P. Queiroz
  - Albizia Durazz.
  - Archidendron F.Muell.
  - Archidendropsis I.C.Nielsen
  - Blanchetiodendron Barneby & J.W.Grimes
  - Calliandra Benth.
  - Cathormion (Benth.) Hassk.
  - Cedrelinga Ducke
  - Chloroleucon (Benth.) Britton & Rose
  - Cojoba Britton & Rose
  - Enterolobium Mart.
  - Faidherbia A.Chev.
  - Falcataria (I.C.Nielsen) Barneby & J.W.Grimes
  - Hesperalbizia Barneby & J.W.Grimes
  - Inga Mill.
  - Leucochloron Barneby & J.W.Grimes
  - Lysiloma Benth.
  - Macrosamanea Britton & Rose
  - Pararchidendron I.C.Nielsen
  - Pseudosamanea Harms
  - Samanea (Benth.) Merr.
  - Sanjappa E.R. Souza & Krishnaraj
  - Serianthes Benth.
  - Thailentadopsis Kosterm.
  - Viguieranthus Villiers
  - Wallaceodendron Koord.
  - Zapoteca H.M.Hern.
  - Zygia P.Browne
- Pithecellobium group
  - Ebenopsis Britton & Rose
  - Havardia Small
  - Painteria Britton & Rose
  - Pithecellobium Mart.
  - Sphinga Barneby & J.W.Grimes
- Acacia group
  - Acacia Mill.
  - Mariosousa Seigler & Ebinger
  - Paraserianthes I.C.Nielsen
  - Parasenegalia Seigler & Ebinger
  - Pseudosenegalia Seigler & Ebinger
  - Senegalia Raf.
  - Vachellia Wight & Arn.

=== Fossils ===
The following fossil wood morphogenera have been described:

- †Acacioxylon Schenk 1883
- †Adenantheroxylon Prakash & Tripathi 1968
- †Albizinium Prakash 1975
- †Albizzioxylon Nikitin 1935
- †Anadenantheroxylon Brea et al. 2001
- †Cathormion Gros 1990
- †Dichrostachyoxylon Müller-Stoll & Mädel 1967
- †Eucacioxylon Müller-Stoll & Mädel 1967
- †Ingoxylon Müller-Stoll & Mädel 1967
- †Menendoxylon Lutz 1979
- †Metacacioxylon Gros 1981
- †Microlobiusxylon Franco & Brea 2010
- †Mimosoxylon Müller-Stoll & Mädel 1967
- †Mimosaceoxylon Lakhanpal & Prakash1970
- †Paraalbizioxylon Gros 1992
- †Paracacioxylon Müller-Stoll & Mädel 1967
- †Piptadenioxylon Suguio & Mussa 1978
- †Prosopisinoxylon Martínez
- †Tetrapleuroxylon Müller-Stoll & Mädel 1967

== Systematics ==
Modern molecular phylogenetics suggests the following relationships:

- - - Diptychandra
    - Moldenhawera
  - - Pachyelasma
    - - Erythrophleum
      - Mimosoideae
        - Chidlowia
        - - Adenanthera Group
          - Pentaclethra
          - Newtonia Group
          - Plathymenia
          - Entada Group
          - - Cylicodiscus
            - Prosopis Group
            - Mimozyganthus Group
            - Neptunia
            - Leucaena Group
            - Dichrostachys Group
            - Acacia Clade
              - Vachellia
              - - Parkia Group
                - - Piptadenia Group
                  - - Senegalia
                    - - Parasenegalia
                      - - Mariosousa
                        - - Abarema Group
                          - Ingeae Grade
                          - Pithecellobium Group
                          - - Paraserianthes
                            - Austroacacia

== Acacieae ==
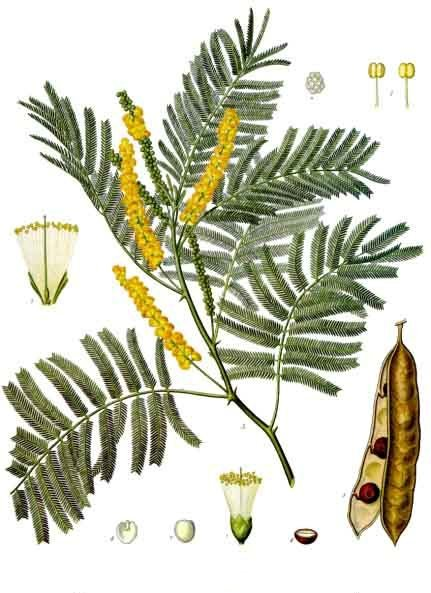
Senegalia catechu

Acacieae (Dumort., 1829) is a wide-ranging, polyphyletic tribe of legumes in the Mimosoideae that is native to the tropics, subtropics, and warm-temperate regions. It includes five or six genera and some 1,450 species.

- Subdivision – 5 or 6 genera
  - Acacia Mill. – type genus
  - Vachellia Wight & Arn.
  - Senegalia Rafinesque
  - Acaciella Britton & Rose
  - Mariosousa Seigler & Ebinger
  - Racosperma Martius

=== Relationships ===
In Bentham's 1842 circumscription of the subfamily Mimosoideae, Acacieae was one of its three constituent tribes, the others being Ingeae Benth. & Hook. f. and Mimoseae Bornn. His Acacieae tribe of 1842 included many genera that were subsequently assigned to tribe Ingeae Benth. In 1875, however, Bentham narrowed his definition of Acacieae so as to include only Acacia Mill.

The only morphological character of Acacieae used to distinguish it from the Ingeae is the presence of free stamens (as in tribe Mimoseae). In Ingeae species they are fused in the form of a tube, whereas in Acacieae only a few species have stamens which are fused at the base. Several characters of the foliage, seeds, seed pods, pollen, and stipules are shared by the two tribes. The flower morphology of Acacia s.l. has characteristics in common with the genera Leucaena, Piptadenia, and Mimosa (tribe Mimoseae) and Enterolobium and Lysiloma (tribe Ingeae).

The tribal position of monotypic genus Faidherbia A. Chevalier is equivocal. It was included in the Acacieae by Vassal (1981) and Maslin et al. (2003), but Lewis & Rico Arce placed it in tribe Ingeae following Polhill (1994) and Luckow et al. (2003). In the latter case, tribe Acacieae may conform to genus Acacia s.l., pending the latter's relationship to other mimosoid genera. Faidherbia is troublesome as its stamens are shortly united at their base and its pollen is similar to some taxa in the Ingeae.

=== Description ===
They are trees, shrubs or lianas, which may be armed or unarmed. Where they have spines, these are modified stipules. In some, prickles arise from the stem's cortex and epidermis. The leaves are bipinnate or are modified to vertically oriented phyllodes. A few have cladodes rather than leaves. Extrafloral nectaries may be present on the petiole and rachis, and the pinnule tips may carry protein-lipid Beltian bodies. The leaflets are usually opposite, and are carried on short stalks or are sessile. The heartwood is typically red and hard, and the sap of various species hardens into gum.

The inflorescences are dense pedunculate heads or spikes borne in axillary clusters, or are aggregated in terminal panicles. The tetra- or pentamerous flowers are uniformly bisexual, or male and bisexual. Sepals are connate (i.e. fused) and valvate (i.e. not overlapping). The reduced petals are valvate, or rarely absent. The flowers have numerous exserted (i.e. protruding) stamens (>2× as many as the corolla lobes), and their filaments are sometimes connate at their base (forming a short stemonozone). Male flowers of some Neotropical species have a reduced staminal tube (cf. A. albicorticata, A. hindsii, A. farnesiana, and S. picachensis). Flowers are usually yellow or cream-coloured, but may be white, red, or purple.

The ovary is sessile or stipitate (i.e. supported by a stipe), with many ovules or ovules arranged in two rows. The ovary is attached by a filiform style to a small, capitate stigma. The legume's endocarp is attached to the exocarp, but is otherwise extremely variable, and may be dehiscent or indehiscent. Seeds are usually elliptic to oblong and flattened to varying degrees. Seeds have a hard black-brown testa (i.e. seed coat) with a pleurogram, visible as a closed or almost closed O-shaped line. Some phyllodinous species have a colourful aril or elaiosome on the seed.
