= Mantiqueira bella =

Scientific classification
- Kingdom: Plantae
- Clade: Tracheophytes
- Clade: Angiosperms
- Clade: Eudicots
- Clade: Rosids
- Order: Fabales
- Family: Fabaceae
- Genus: Mantiqueira; L.P.Queiroz (2020)
- Species: M. bella

Binomial name
- Mantiqueira bella (Mart. ex Benth.) L.P.Queiroz (2020)

Synonyms
- Bionia bella Mart. ex Benth. (1937); Camptosema bellum (Mart. ex Benth.) Benth. (1859)

Species of flowering plant

Mantiqueira bella is a species of flowering plant in the legume family, Fabaceae. It is the sole species in genus Mantiquiera. It is a climber native to Minas Gerais state in southeastern Brazil.
