= Mezcala balsensis =

Scientific classification
- Kingdom: Plantae
- Clade: Tracheophytes
- Clade: Angiosperms
- Clade: Eudicots
- Clade: Rosids
- Order: Fabales
- Family: Fabaceae
- Genus: Mezcala; C.E.Hughes & J.L.Contr. (2022)
- Species: M. balsensis

Binomial name
- Mezcala balsensis (J.L.Contr.) C.E.Hughes & J.L.Contr. (2022)

Synonyms
- Desmanthus balsensis J.L.Contr. (1986)

Species of flowering plant

Mezcala balsensis is a species of flowering plant in the legume family, Fabaceae. It is the sole species in genus Mezcala. It is a shrub or tree endemic to Guerrero state in southwestern Mexico.
