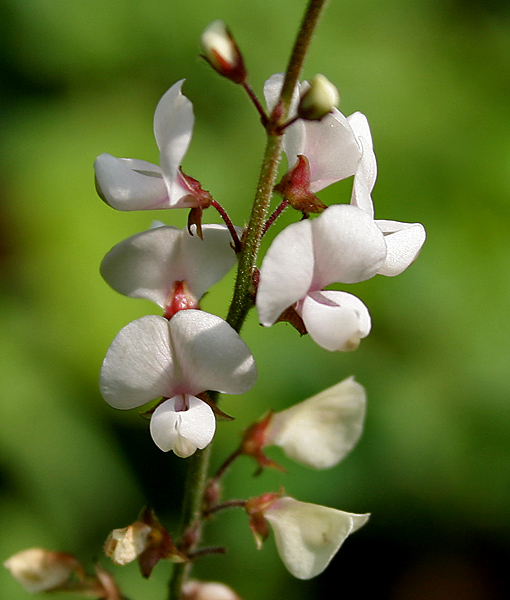
- Pleurolobus gangeticus

Scientific classification
- Kingdom: Plantae
- Clade: Embryophytes
- Clade: Tracheophytes
- Clade: Spermatophytes
- Clade: Angiosperms
- Clade: Eudicots
- Clade: Rosids
- Order: Fabales
- Family: Fabaceae
- Subfamily: Faboideae
- Clade: Meso-Papilionoideae
- Clade: Non-protein amino acid-accumulating clade
- Clade: Millettioids
- Tribe: Desmodieae; Hutch.

= Desmodieae =

Tribe of legumes

The tribe Desmodieae is one of the subdivisions of the plant family Fabaceae. It is composed of two subtribes, Desmodiinae and Lespedezinae. Recent phylogenetics has this tribe nested within tribe Phaseoleae.

== Genera ==
The following genera are recognized by the USDA:

=== Desmodium clade ===
- Alysicarpus Desv. 1813
- Bouffordia H.Ohashi & K.Ohashi
- Christia Moench 1802
- Codariocalyx Hassk. 1842
- Desmodiastrum (Prain) A. Pramanik & Thoth. 1986
- Desmodium Desv. 1813—tick clover
- Eleiotis DC. 1825
- Grona Lour.
- Hegnera Schindl. 1924
- Huangtcia H.Ohashi & K.Ohashi 2019
- Hylodesmum H.Ohashi & R.R.Mill 2000
- Leptodesmia (Benth.) Benth. & Hook. f. 1865
- Mecopus Benn. 1840
- Melliniella Harms 1914
- Monarthrocarpus Merr. 1910
- Ototropis Nees
- Pleurolobus J.St.-Hil.
- Polhillides H.Ohashi & K.Ohashi
- Pseudarthria Wight & Arn. 1834
- Puhuaea H.Ohashi & K.Ohashi 2019
- Pycnospora R. Br. ex Wight & Arn. 1834
- Sohmaea H.Ohashi & K.Ohashi
- Sunhangia H.Ohashi & K.Ohashi 2019
- Tateishia H.Ohashi & K.Ohashi
- Trifidacanthus Merr. 1917
- Uraria Desv. 1813

=== Lespedeza clade ===
- Campylotropis Bunge 1835
- Kummerowia Schindl. 1912
- Lespedeza Michx. 1803—bush clovers, Japanese clovers

=== Phyllodium clade ===
- Akschindlium H.Ohashi 2003
- Aphyllodium (DC.) Gagnep. 1916
- Arthroclianthus Baill. 1870
- Dendrolobium (Wight & Arn.) Benth. 1852
- Droogmansia De Wild. 1902
- Hanslia Schindl. 1924
- Nephrodesmus Schindl. 1916
- Ohwia H.Ohashi 1999
- Ougeinia Benth. 1852
- Phyllodium Desv. 1813
- Tadehagi H. Ohashi 1973
- Verdesmum H. Ohashi & K. Ohashi 2012

== Phylogeny ==
The following phylogenetic tree shows the relationships between different genera of the tribe Desmodieae.

- - - Desmodieae
      - - Phyllodium Clade
          - - - - - - Arthroclianthus
                    - Nephrodesmus pro parte
                  - - - Nephrodesmus pro parte
                      - Hanslia
                    - Ohwia
                - - Phyllodium
                  - Dendrolobium
              - - - Droogmansia
                  - Akschindlium
                - Tadehagi
            - Aphyllodium
          - Ougeinia
        - Desmodium Clade
          - - - - - - - Christia
                      - Uraria pro parte
                    - Mecopus
                  - - - - - Desmodium pro parte
                          - Hegnera
                        - Uraria pro parte
                      - - Melliniella
                        - Alysicarpus
                    - Desmodium pro parte
                - - Leptodesmia
                  - Codariocalyx
              - Desmodium pro parte
            - Pseudarthria
          - Hylodesmum
      - Lespedeza Clade
        - Campylotropis
        - - Kummerowia
          - Lespedeza
    - - Phaseolus (outgroup)
      - Vigna (outgroup)
  - - Muellera (outgroup)
    - Fordia (outgroup)

== Bibliography ==
- Raveill, Jay A. (2006). "Identification of Missouri species of the tribe Desmodieae (Fabaceae) using vegetative characters" (PDF). Vulpia. 5: 14–22.
