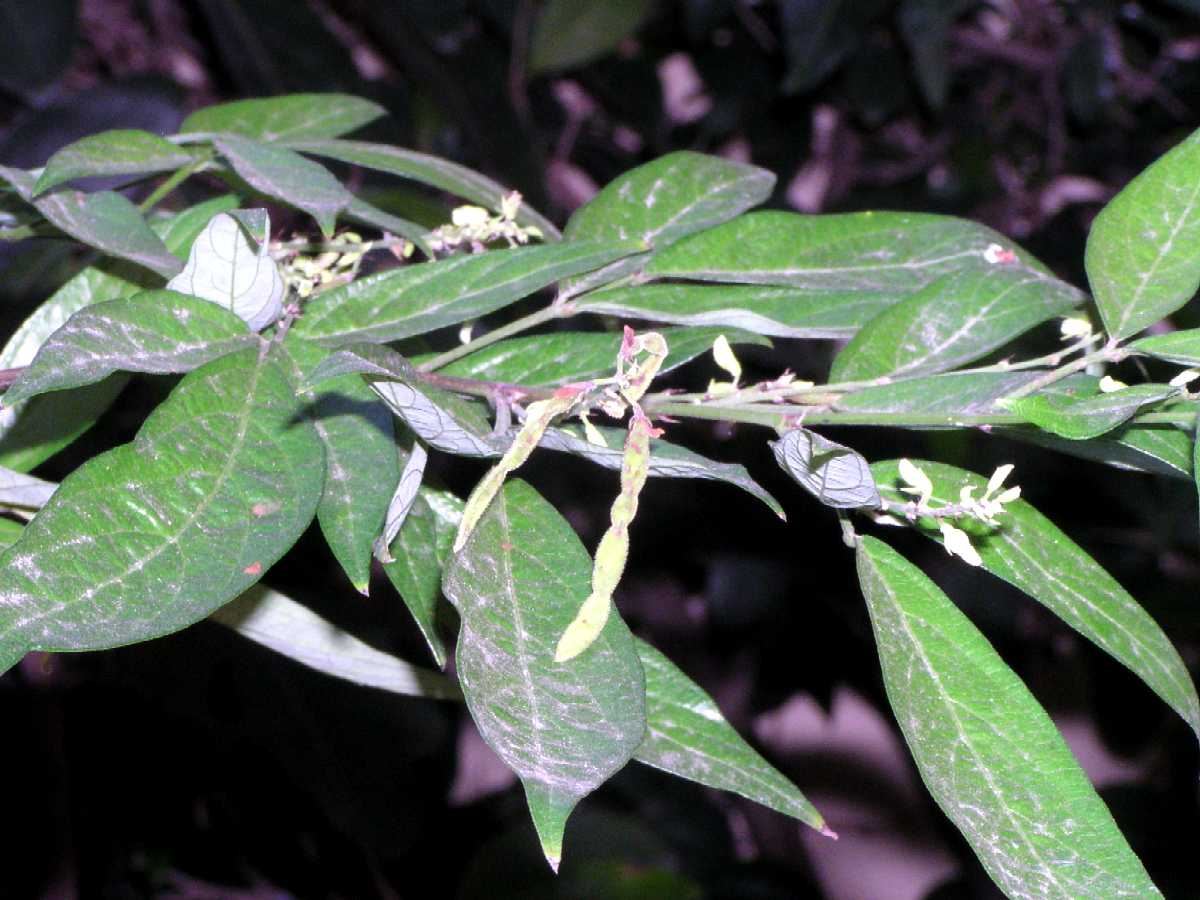

Scientific classification
- Kingdom: Plantae
- Clade: Tracheophytes
- Clade: Angiosperms
- Clade: Eudicots
- Clade: Rosids
- Order: Fabales
- Family: Fabaceae
- Subfamily: Faboideae
- Genus: Ohwia
- Species: O. caudata

Binomial name
- Ohwia caudata (Thunb.) H.Ohashi

Synonyms
- Desmodium caudatum (Thunb.) DC.; Catenaria caudata (Thunb.) Schindl.; Desmodium laburnifolium (Poir.) DC.; Hedysarum caudatum Thunb.; Hedysarum laburnifolium Poir.; Meibomia laburnifolia (Poir.) Kuntze; Ohwia caudatum (Thunb.) H. Ohashi

= Ohwia caudata =

Species of legume

Ohwia caudata, formerly placed in the genus Desmodium (as D. caudatum), is a deciduous nitrogen fixing plant in the family Fabaceae. It is found in India, China, Taiwan and other parts of Asia. The shrub grows to a height of about 1.5 m (4 ft 11 in) tall. It is related to Arthroclianthus, Nephrodesmus and Hanslia. The leaves and roots of the plant are used as an insecticide.
