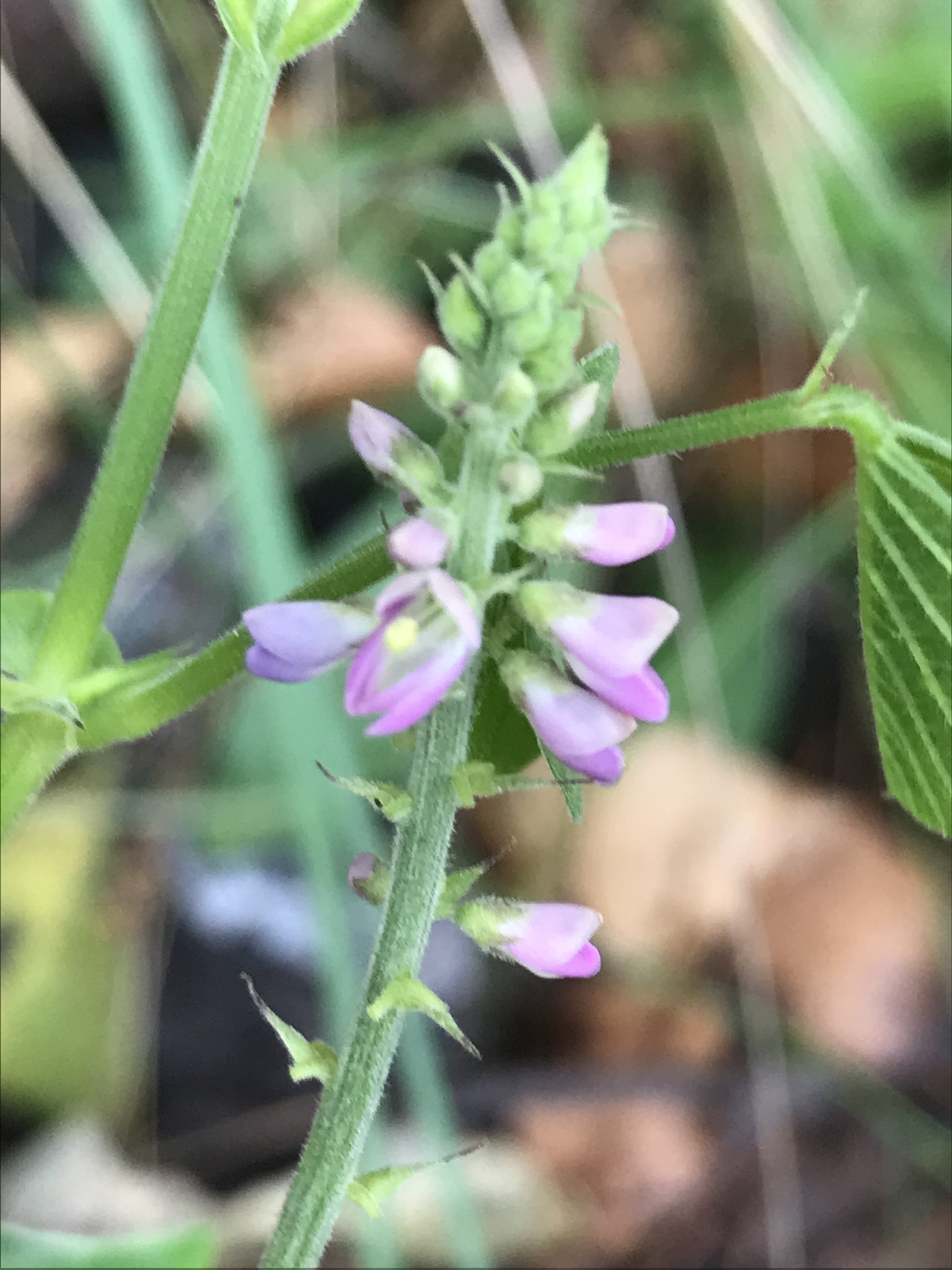
- Dargo, VIC (2022-01-07)

Scientific classification
- Kingdom: Plantae
- Clade: Embryophytes
- Clade: Tracheophytes
- Clade: Spermatophytes
- Clade: Angiosperms
- Clade: Eudicots
- Clade: Rosids
- Order: Fabales
- Family: Fabaceae
- Subfamily: Faboideae
- Genus: Oxytes
- Species: O. brachypoda

Binomial name
- Oxytes brachypoda (A.Gray) H.Ohashi & K.Ohashi

Synonyms
- Desmodium brachypodum A.Gray; Meibomia brachypoda (A.Gray) Kuntze; Desmodium indigotinum Harms & K.Schum.

= Oxytes brachypoda =

Species of plant

Oxytes brachpoda (common name - large tick-trefoil) is a species of flowering plant belonging to the family Fabaceae. Its native range is Papua New Guinea to northern and eastern Australia and New Caledonia. (In Australia, it is found in the Northern Territory, Queensland, New South Wales, and Victoria.)

It was first described in 1854 by Asa Gray as Desmodium brachypodum, from specimens found in Sydney and the Hunter River, but in 2018, it was transferred to the genus, Oxytes

It flowers from spring to autumn (in New South Wales) and is common in sclerophyll forests. In the Northern Territory, it flowers from March to June and is found in Acacia shirleyi thickets and Eucalypt savanna.

== Gallery ==
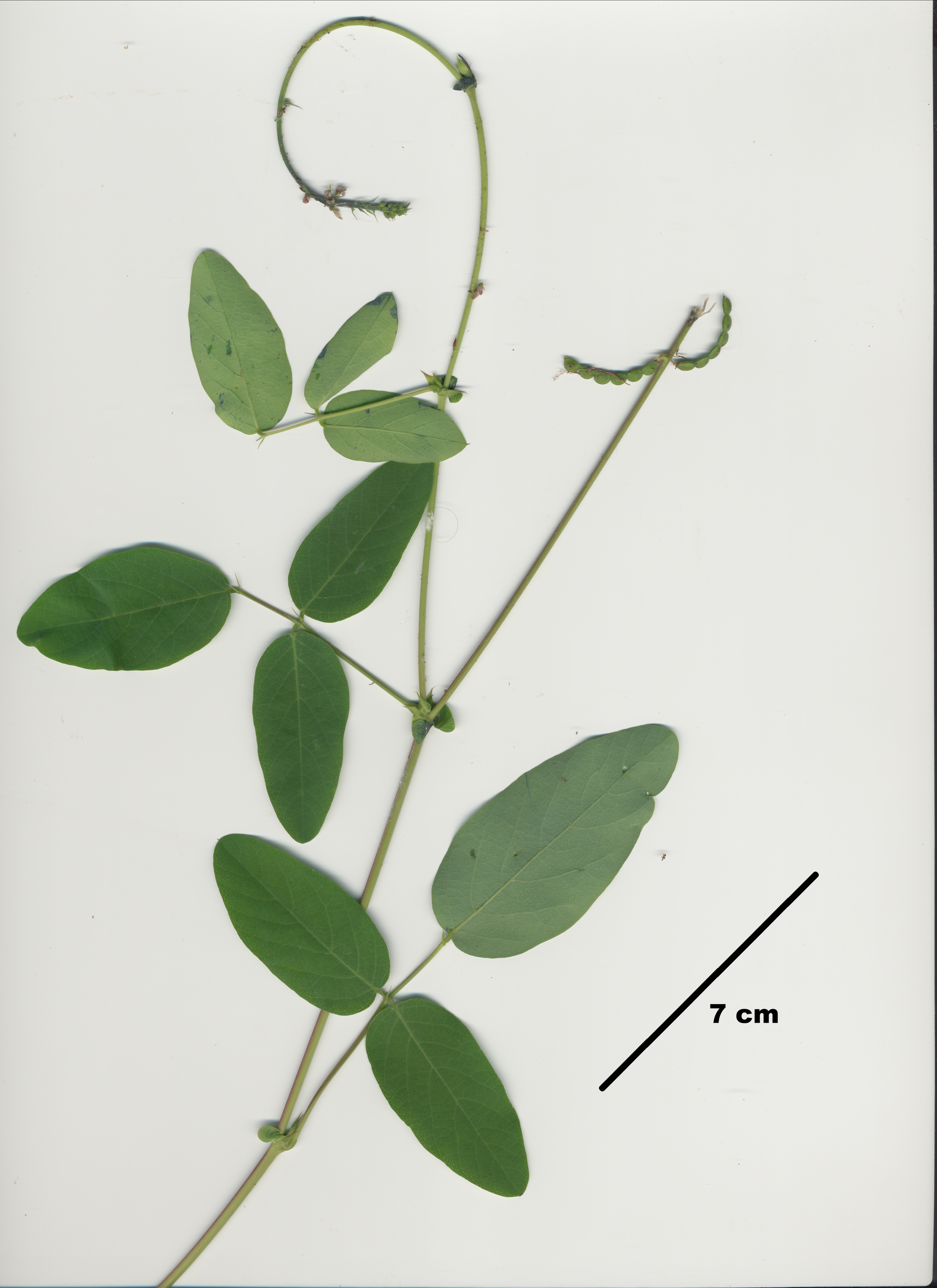

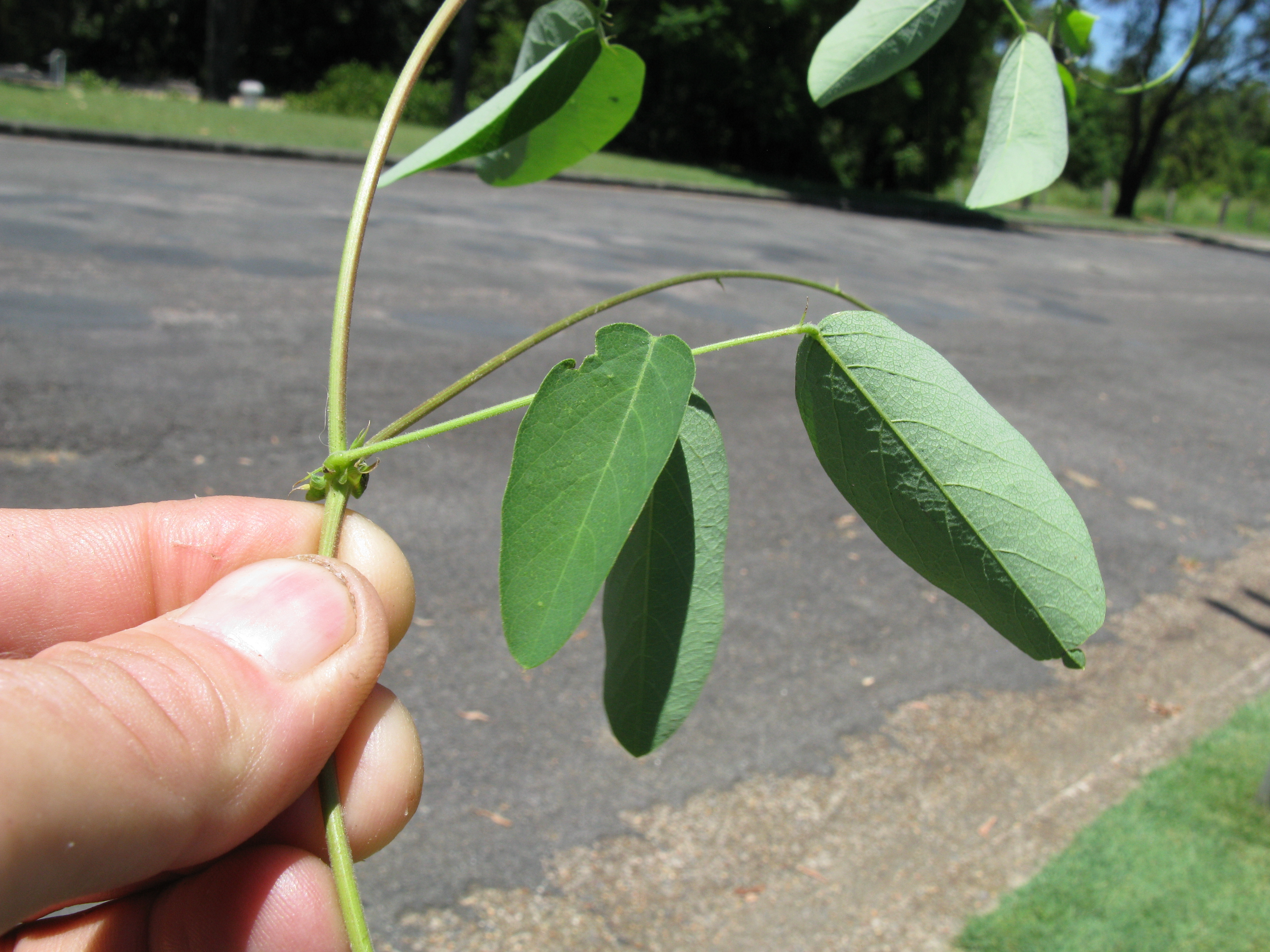

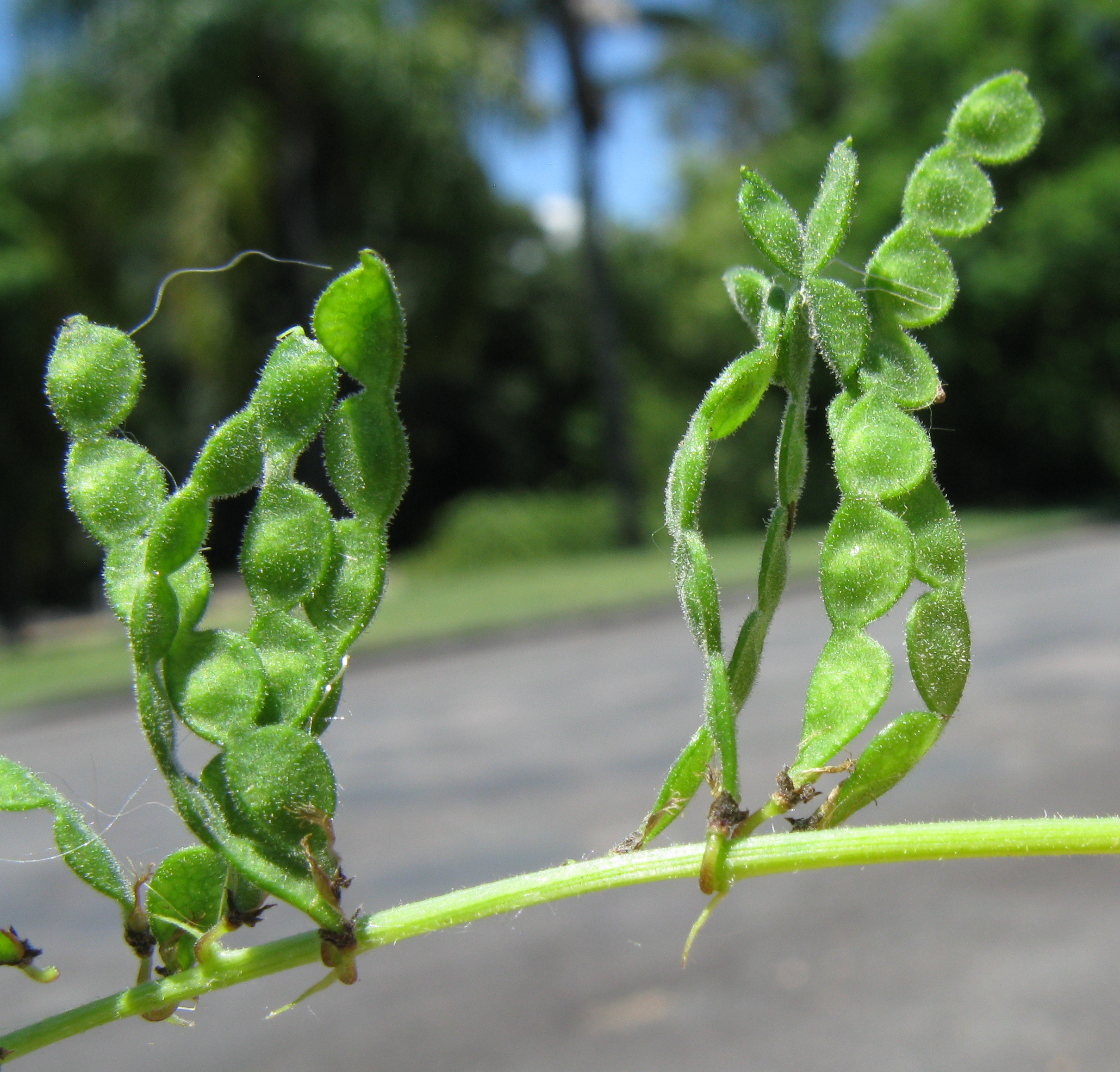
