= Arthroclianthus =

Scientific classification
- Kingdom: Plantae
- Clade: Tracheophytes
- Clade: Angiosperms
- Clade: Eudicots
- Clade: Rosids
- Order: Fabales
- Family: Fabaceae
- Subfamily: Faboideae
- Tribe: Desmodieae
- Genus: Arthroclianthus; Baill. (1870)

Species
- 13; see text

Genus of legumes

Arthroclianthus is a genus of flowering plants in the family Fabaceae. It belongs to the subfamily Faboideae. Its 13–19 species are all endemic to New Caledonia. Its closest relatives include Nephrodesmus, also endemic to New Caledonia, Ohwia and Hanslia.

== Species ==
13 species are accepted:

- Arthroclianthus andersonii (Seem.) Schindl.
- Arthroclianthus angustifolius Hochr.
- Arthroclianthus balansae Schindl.
- Arthroclianthus cuneatus Schindl.
- Arthroclianthus deplanchei Hochr.
- Arthroclianthus grandifolius Baker f.
- Arthroclianthus leratii Schindl.
- Arthroclianthus macrobotryosus Hochr.
- Arthroclianthus macrophyllus Schindl.
- Arthroclianthus maximus Schindl.
- Arthroclianthus microbotrys Hochr.
- Arthroclianthus obovatus Hochr.
- Arthroclianthus sanguineus Baill.
