= Tateishia =

Scientific classification
- Kingdom: Plantae
- Clade: Tracheophytes
- Clade: Angiosperms
- Clade: Eudicots
- Clade: Rosids
- Order: Fabales
- Family: Fabaceae
- Subfamily: Faboideae
- Clade: Millettioids
- Tribe: Desmodieae
- Genus: Tateishia; H.Ohashi & K.Ohashi

Genus of flowering plants

Tateishia is a genus of flowering plants belonging to the family Fabaceae.

Its native range stretches from the Indian subcontinent to southern China, Myanmar and the Philippines. It is found in Assam, Bangladesh, China, East and West Himalayas, India, Myanmar, Nepal, Pakistan and Philippines.

The genus was circumscribed by Hiroyoshi Ohashi and Kazuaki K. Ohashi in J. Jap. Bot. vol.93 (3) on page 178 in 2018.

The genus name of Tateishia is in honour of Yoichi Tateishi (b.1948), a Japanese botanist and Professor at the University of the Ryukyus in Okinawa, Japan.

Species:

- Tateishia bolsteri (Merr. & Rolfe) H.Ohashi & K.Ohashi
- Tateishia concinna (DC.) H.Ohashi & K.Ohashi
- Tateishia retusa (D.Don) H.Ohashi & K.Ohashi
