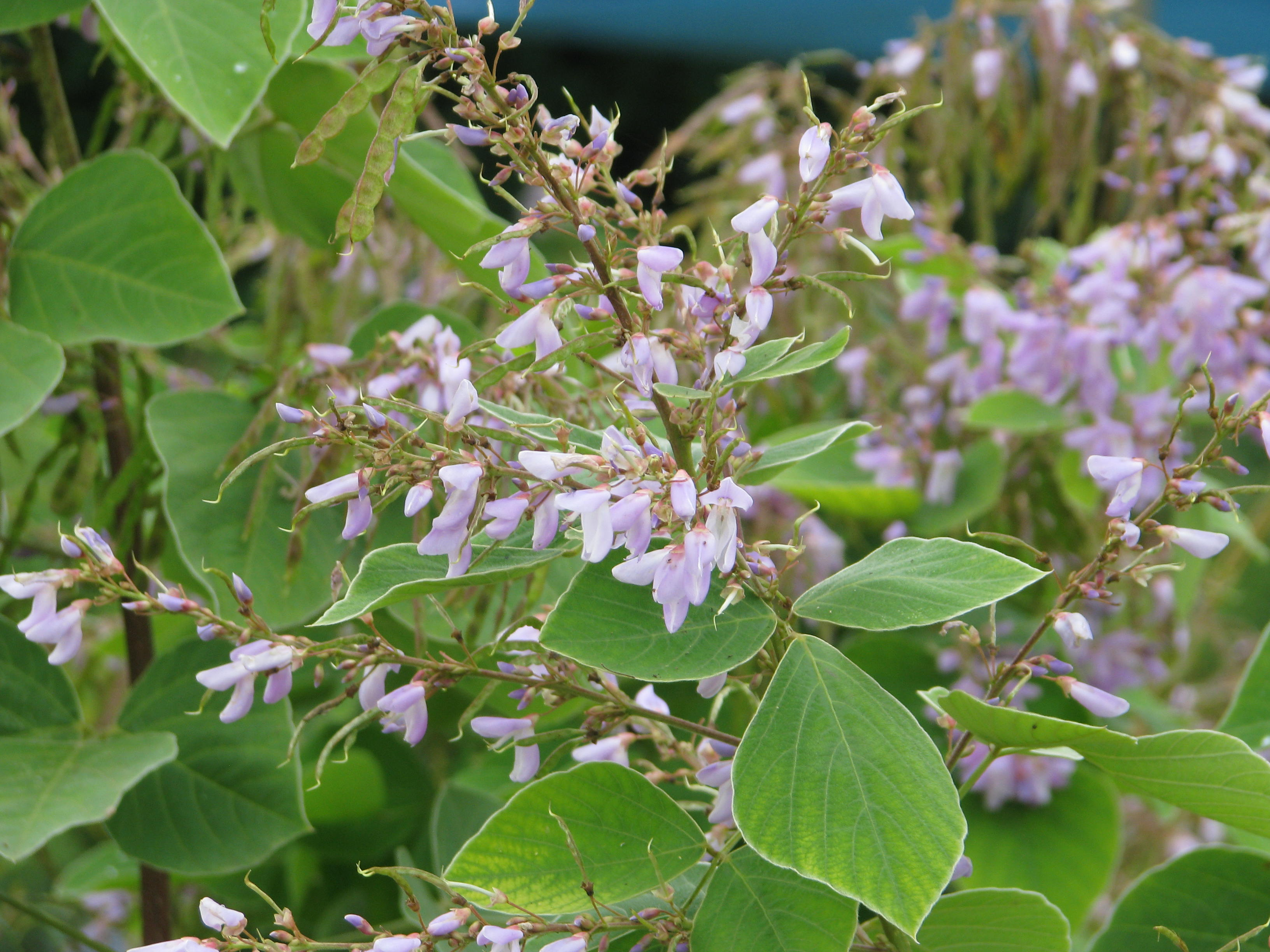
- Ototropis elegans

Scientific classification
- Kingdom: Plantae
- Clade: Tracheophytes
- Clade: Angiosperms
- Clade: Eudicots
- Clade: Rosids
- Order: Fabales
- Family: Fabaceae
- Subfamily: Faboideae
- Clade: Millettioids
- Tribe: Desmodieae
- Genus: Ototropis; Nees (1839)

Species
- See text

Synonyms
- Dollinera Endl. (1840); Tetranema Sweet (1830), not validly publ.

= Ototropis =

Genus of Fabaceae plants

Ototropis is a genus of flowering plants in the family Fabaceae, found from Afghanistan, the Indian Subcontinent through to southern China including Taiwan, Southeast Asia, Indonesia and on to New Guinea, and introduced to Japan. There has been some nomenclatural confusion regarding this taxon over the centuries.

== Species ==
Currently (as of 2023) eight species are accepted:

- Ototropis amethystina (Dunn) H.Ohashi & K.Ohashi
- Ototropis conferta (DC.) H.Ohashi & K.Ohashi
- Ototropis hayatae (H.Ohashi) H.Ohashi & K.Ohashi
- Ototropis khasiana (Prain) H.Ohashi & K.Ohashi
- Ototropis kulhaitensis (C.B.Clarke ex Prain) H.Ohashi & K.Ohashi
- Ototropis likabalia (Bennet & Sum.Chandra) H.Ohashi & K.Ohashi
- Ototropis multiflora (DC.) H.Ohashi & K.Ohashi
- Ototropis siamensis (Schindl.) H.Ohashi & K.Ohashi

Former species;

- Ototropis kingiana (Prain) H.Ohashi & K.Ohashi, has been transferred to a new genus as Daprainia kingiana (Prain) H.Ohashi & K.Ohashi
- Ototropis elegans (DC.) H.Ohashi & K.Ohashi, a synonym of Sunhangia elegans (DC.) H.Ohashi & K.Ohashi
- Ototropis megaphylla (Zoll. & Moritzi) H.Ohashi & K.Ohashi, a synonym of Puhuaea megaphylla (Zoll. & Moritzi) H.Ohashi & K.Ohashi
- Ototropis sequax (Wall.) H.Ohashi & K.Ohashi, a synonym of Puhuaea sequax (Wall.) H.Ohashi & K.Ohashi
- Ototropis yunnanensis (Franch.) H.Ohashi & K.Ohashi, a synonym of Sunhangia yunnanensis (Franch.) H.Ohashi & K.Ohashi
