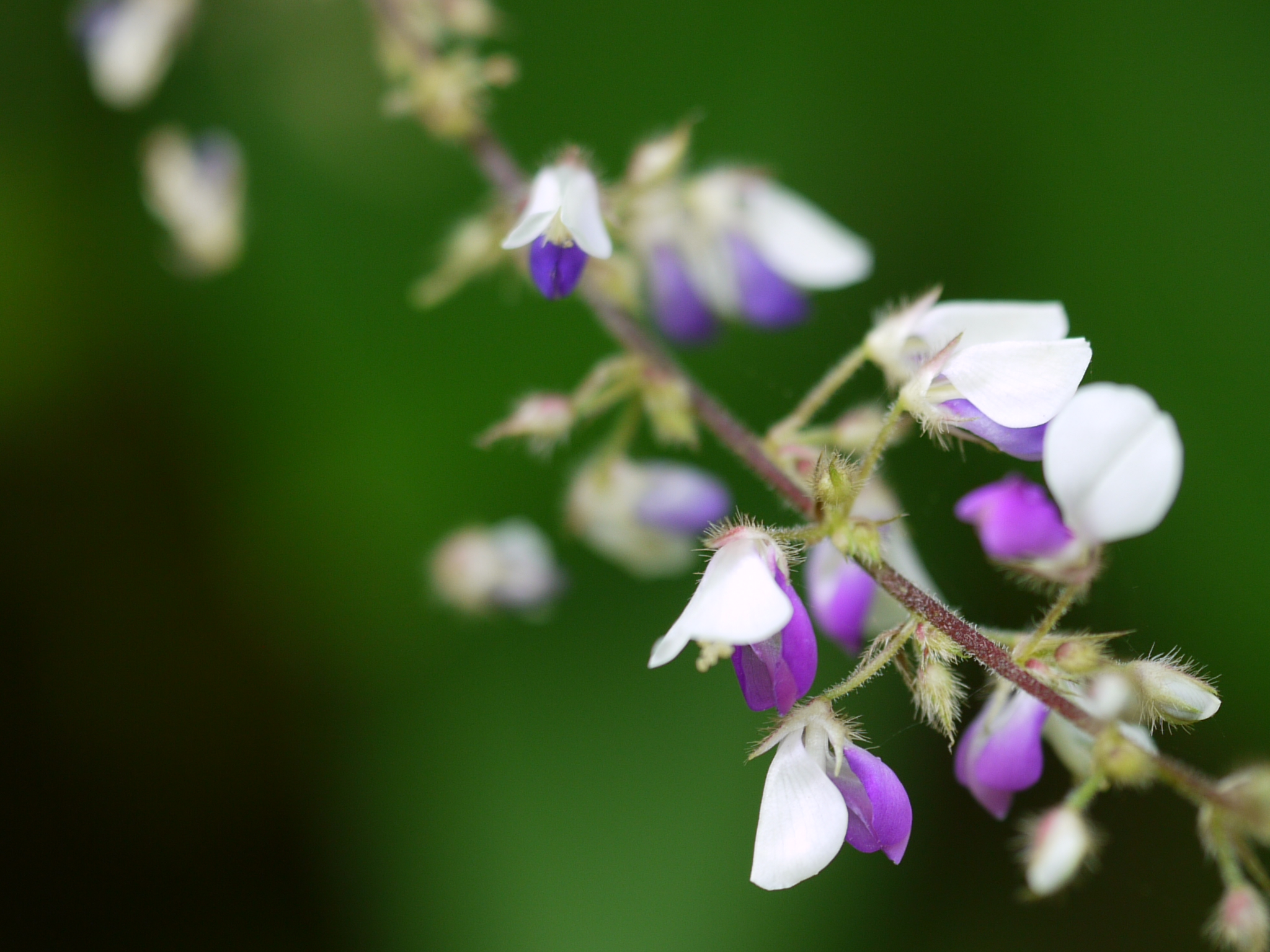
- Specimen in Thane, India

Scientific classification
- Kingdom: Plantae
- Clade: Tracheophytes
- Clade: Angiosperms
- Clade: Eudicots
- Clade: Rosids
- Order: Fabales
- Family: Fabaceae
- Subfamily: Faboideae
- Tribe: Desmodieae
- Genus: Sohmaea; H.Ohashi & K.Ohashi

= Sohmaea =

Genus of plants

Sohmaea is a genus of flowering plants belonging to the family Fabaceae.

Its native range is tropical and subtropical Asia. It is found in Andaman Islands, Assam, Bangladesh, Bismarck Archipelago, Borneo, China, East Himalaya, Hainan, India, Java, Laos, Lesser Sunda Islands, Malaya, Maluku, Myanmar, Nepal, New Guinea, Nicobar Islands, Pakistan, Philippines, Sulawesi, Sumatera, Taiwan, Thailand, Vietnam and West Himalaya.

It is listed as extinct in Sri Lanka.

The genus was circumscribed by Hiroyoshi Ohashi and Kazuaki K. Ohashi in J. Jap. Bot. vol.93 on page 159 in 2018.

The genus name of Sohmaea is in honour of Kankichi Sohma (1926–1995), who was a Japanese botanist who worked at Tohoku University and was interested in analysis of pollen and Palynology (dust).

== Species ==
As accepted by Kew;

- Sohmaea barbaticaulis (Iokawa, T.Nemoto, J.Murata & H.Ohashi) H.Ohashi & K.Ohashi
- Sohmaea diffusa (DC.) H.Ohashi & K.Ohashi
- Sohmaea gracillima (Hemsl.) H.Ohashi & K.Ohashi
- Sohmaea hispida (Franch.) H.Ohashi & K.Ohashi
- Sohmaea lacei (Schindl.) H.Ohashi & K.Ohashi
- Sohmaea laxiflora (DC.) H.Ohashi & K.Ohashi
- Sohmaea teres (Wall. ex Benth.) H.Ohashi & K.Ohashi
- Sohmaea zonata (Miq.) H.Ohashi & K.Ohashi
