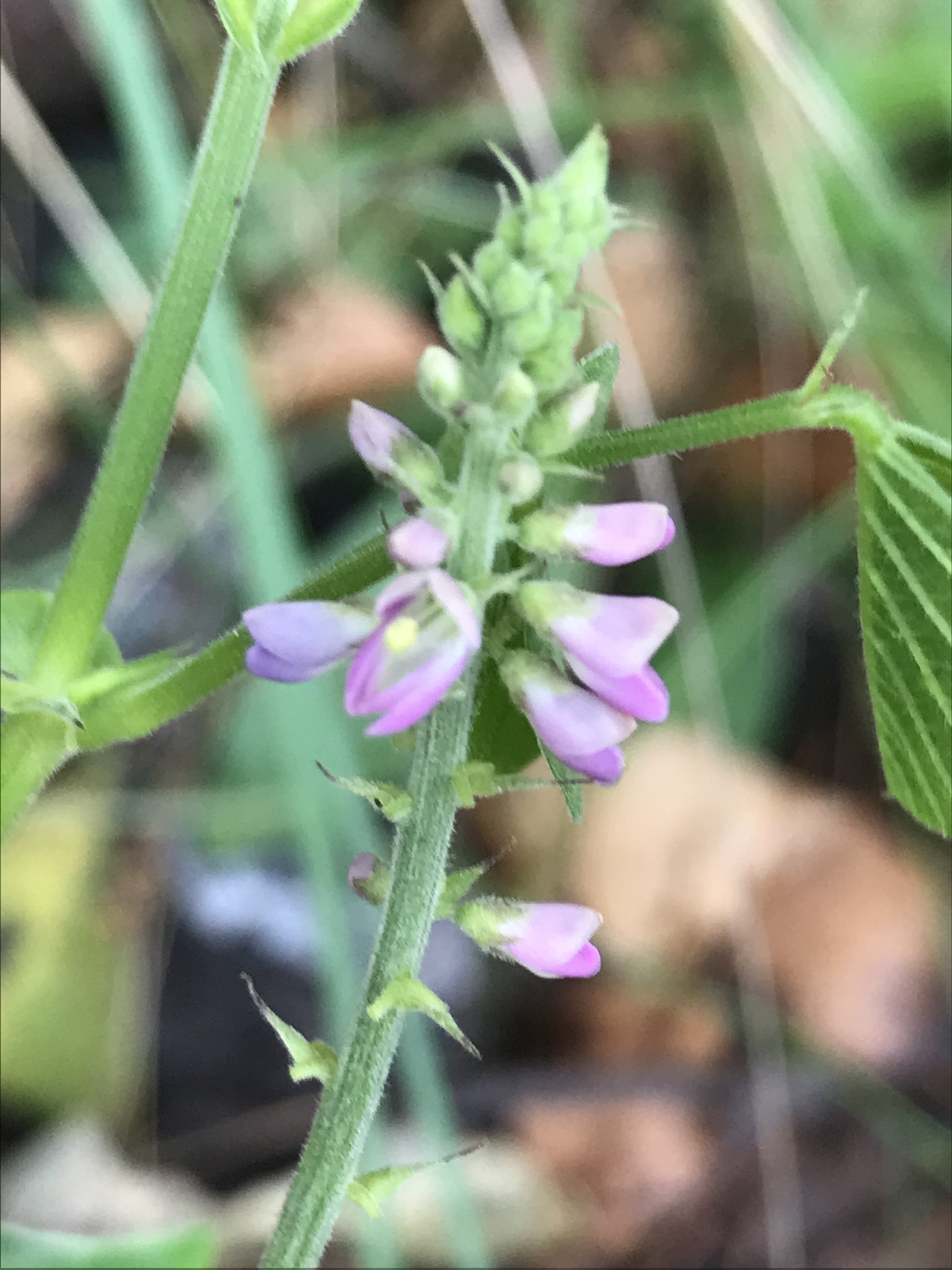
- Oxytes brachypoda, Dargo, VIC (2022-01-07)

Scientific classification
- Kingdom: Plantae
- Clade: Tracheophytes
- Clade: Angiosperms
- Clade: Eudicots
- Clade: Rosids
- Order: Fabales
- Family: Fabaceae
- Genus: Oxytes (Schindl.) H.Ohashi & K.Ohashi (2018)

= Oxytes =

Genus of plants

Oxytes is a genus of flowering plants belonging to the family Fabaceae.

Its native range is Papua New Guinea to northern and eastern Australia and New Caledonia.

== Species ==
Species:

- Oxytes brachypoda (A.Gray) H.Ohashi & K.Ohashi
- Oxytes deplanchei (Harms) H.Ohashi & K.Ohashi
- Oxytes kaalensis (Guillaumin) H.Ohashi & K.Ohashi
- Oxytes pycnostachya (Benth.) H.Ohashi & K.Ohashi
