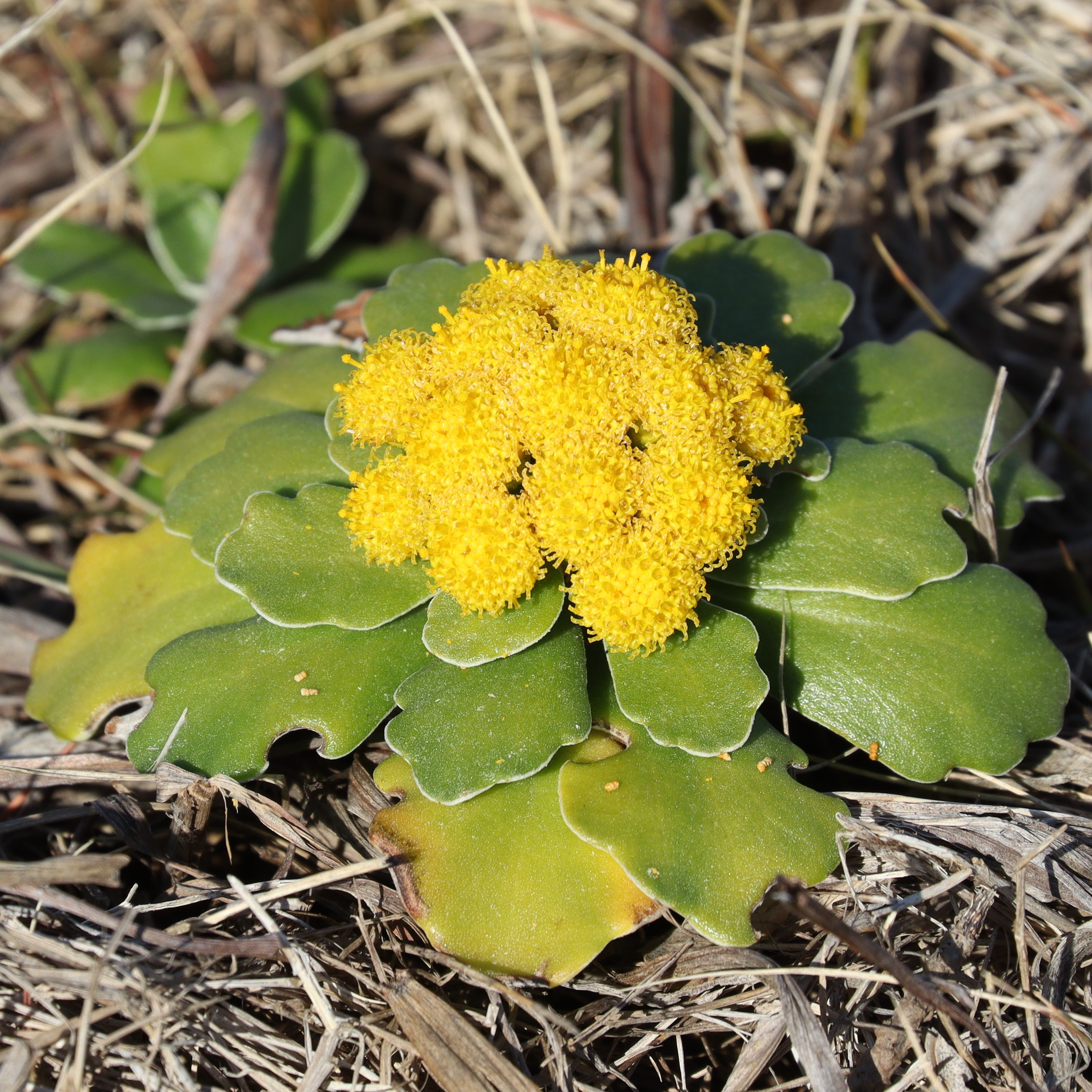

Scientific classification
- Kingdom: Plantae
- Clade: Tracheophytes
- Clade: Angiosperms
- Clade: Eudicots
- Clade: Asterids
- Order: Asterales
- Family: Asteraceae
- Genus: Chrysanthemum
- Species: C. kinokuniense

Binomial name
- Chrysanthemum kinokuniense (Shimot. & Kitam.) H.Ohashi & Yonek.

Synonyms
- Chrysanthemum shiwogiku var. kinokuniense (basionym)

= Chrysanthemum kinokuniense =

Species of plant

Chrysanthemum kinokuniense (キイシオギク, Kii shiogiku) is a species of flowering plant in the family Asteraceae that is endemic to the Kii Peninsula of Honshū, Japan.

== Taxonomy ==
First described in 1935 by Japanese botanists Naomasa Shimotomai and Siro Kitamura (北村四郎), as Chrysanthemum shiwogiku var. kinokuniense, it was elevated to independent species status within the section Ajania in 2004 by Hiroyoshi Ohashi and Koji Yonekura (米倉浩司). The specific epithet relates to the type locality in former Kii Province.

== Distribution ==
Chrysanthemum kinokuniense occurs in coastal areas of the Kii Peninsula, in what is now Wakayama Prefecture and Mie Prefecture.
