= Pauline Dy Phon =

Cambodian botanist (1933-2010)

- ប៉ូលីន ឌី ផុន
- Born: Tan Pauline; 15 January 1933
- Died: 21 May 2010 (aged 77)
- Education: University of Toulouse
- Known for: Botany; Flora of Cambodia
- Scientific career
- Workplaces: University of Phnom Penh; National Museum of Natural History, Paris
- Thesis: The vegetation of South West Cambodia
- Author abbrev. (botany): DyPhon

Pauline Dy Phon (ប៉ូលីន ឌី ផុន) (1933 – 21 May 2010) (née Tan Pauline) was a Cambodian botanist who specialized in the flora of Southeast Asia.

She studied in France, graduating in 1959 from the Faculty of Sciences in Paris. She met her husband Dy Phon, a student of dental surgery, while there. They returned to Cambodia in 1959. She later moved to University of Toulouse in France and was awarded a Ph.D. for her research on botany on the vegetation of south-west Cambodia in 1969.

She became a teacher and researcher at the University of Phnom Penh. Her research was on the flora of Cambodia and surrounding regions. She specialised in the Faboideae subfamily particularly the genera Euchresta, Gueldenstaedtia, Medicago, Parochetus and the monospecific genus Trifidacanthus.

In 1975 she was forced to stop work because the Khmer Rouge came to power. She reached the Khao-I-Dang refugee camp in Thailand. In 1980, she managed to flee to France and work in the Botanical Laboratory of the National Museum of Natural History in Paris. In the same institution she contributed significantly to identifying and classifying plants of Cambodia and Indochina, which remain relatively unknown. She wrote a book, published in 1982, about the food plants of Cambodia that were eaten in normal and famine times.

In 1994 Dy Phon returned to Cambodia and continued to work on the country's flora. She published a 915-page trilingual directory (Khmer, French, English) of the Dictionary of plants used in Cambodia in 2000.

She died on 21 May 2010.

The standard author abbreviation DyPhon is used to indicate this person as the author when citing a botanical name.

== Publications ==
Her selected publications include:

- Pauline Dy Phon (1962) Practical works of micrography and plant morphology for the use of students in SPCN-PCB, 2 vol., 200 p, Phnom Penh
- Pauline Dy Phon (1970) The vegetation of Southwest Cambodia (published thesis, part I, Annales Faculty of Sciences, Phnom Penh University
- Pauline Dy Phon (1971) The vegetation of SouthWest Cambodia (part II).
- Pauline Dy Phon (1982) Plants in the Khmer diet in normal times and in times of famine, CEDRASEMI Paris - Brief overview on Cambodian forests, Seksa Khmer, n. 5
- Pauline Dy Phon, N. V. Thuân and Nyomdham (1987) Flore du Cambodge, du Laos et du Vietnam, Muséum national Histoire naturelle, Paris, Fasc. 23, 258 p.
- Pauline Dy Phon and Bernard Rollet (1999) Lexique des Arbres Forestiers du Cambodge. EFEO Publications
