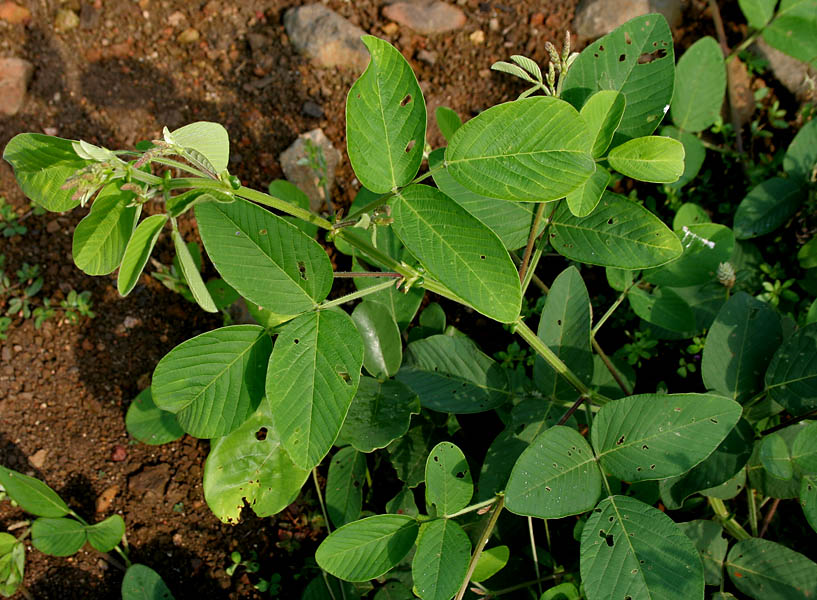
- Uraria rufescens

Scientific classification
- Kingdom: Plantae
- Clade: Tracheophytes
- Clade: Angiosperms
- Clade: Eudicots
- Clade: Rosids
- Order: Fabales
- Family: Fabaceae
- Subfamily: Faboideae
- Tribe: Desmodieae
- Subtribe: Desmodiinae
- Genus: Uraria; Desv. (1813)

Synonyms
- Doodia Roxb. (1832)

= Uraria =

Genus of legumes

Uraria is a genus of plants in the legume family, Fabaceae. It includes 24 species of shrubs and subshrubs native to sub-Saharan Africa, the Indian Subcontinent, Indochina, China, Malesia, Papuasia, Australia, and the South Pacific. Typical habitats are seasonally-dry tropical woodland or grassland. It belongs to the subfamily Faboideae and the tribe Desmodieae.

== Species ==
24 species are accepted by Plants of the World Online.

- Uraria acaulis Schindl.
- Uraria acuminata Kurz
- Uraria balansae Schindl.
- Uraria campanulata (Benth.) Gagnep.
- Uraria candida Backer
- Uraria cochinchinensis Schindl.
- Uraria cordifolia Wall.
- Uraria crinita (L.) Desv. ex DC.
- Uraria gossweileri Baker f.
- Uraria gracilis Prain
- Uraria kurzii Schindl.
- Uraria lacei Craib
- Uraria lagopodioides (L.) DC.
- Uraria lagopus DC.
- Uraria oblonga (Wall. ex Benth.) H.Ohashi & K.Ohashi
- Uraria picta (Jacq.) Desv. ex DC.
- Uraria pierrei Schindl.
- Uraria poilanei Dy Phon
- Uraria prunellifolia Graham ex Baker
- Uraria pseudoacuminata W.Tokaew & Chantar.
- Uraria pulchra Haines
- Uraria rotundata Craib
- Uraria rufescens (DC.) Schindl.
- Uraria sinensis Franch.

== Gallery ==
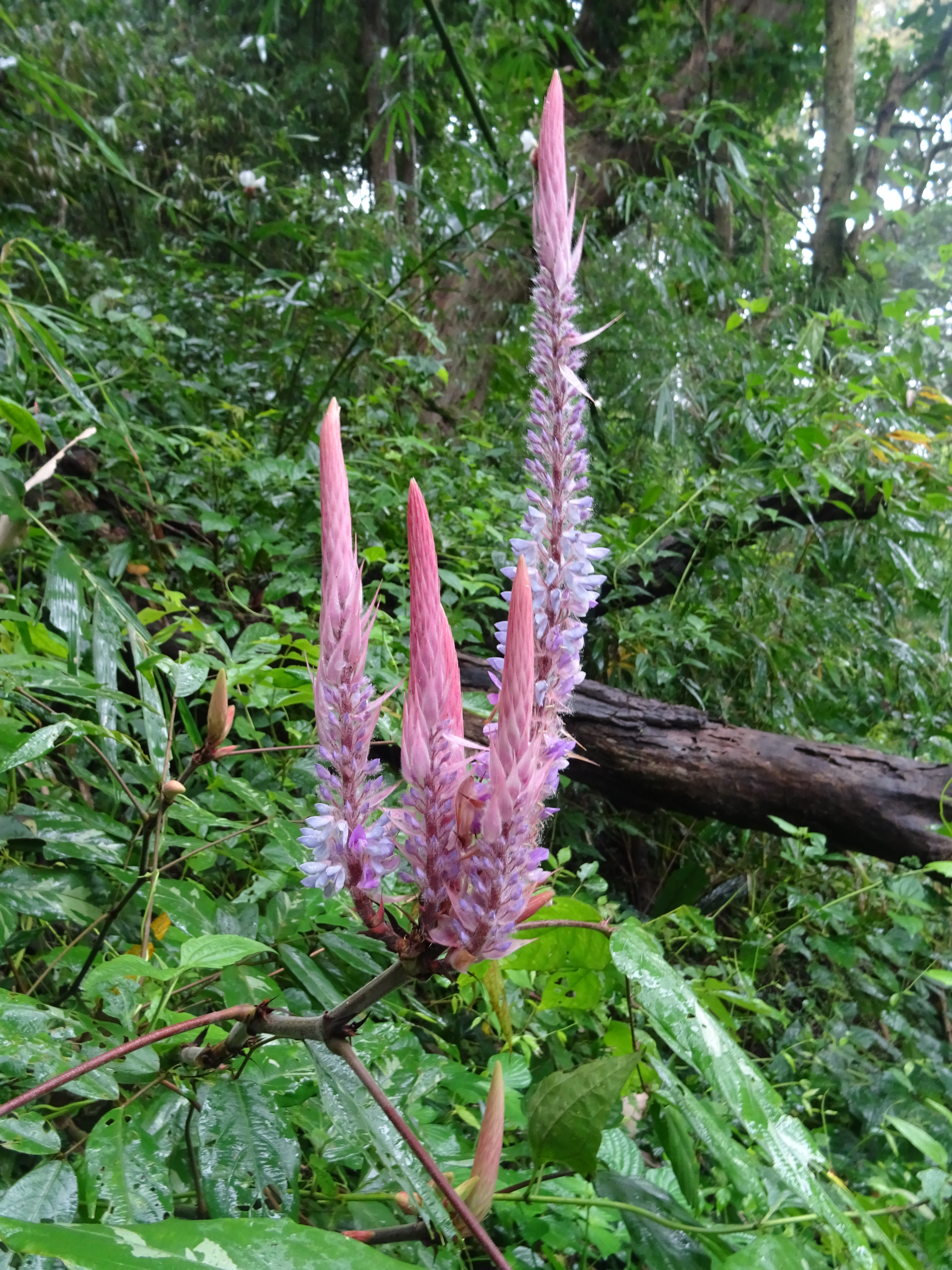

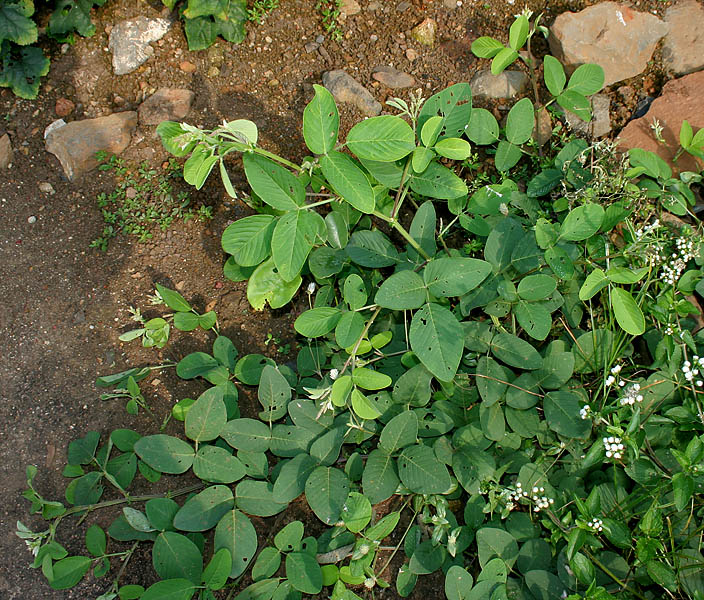
Uraria rufescens
