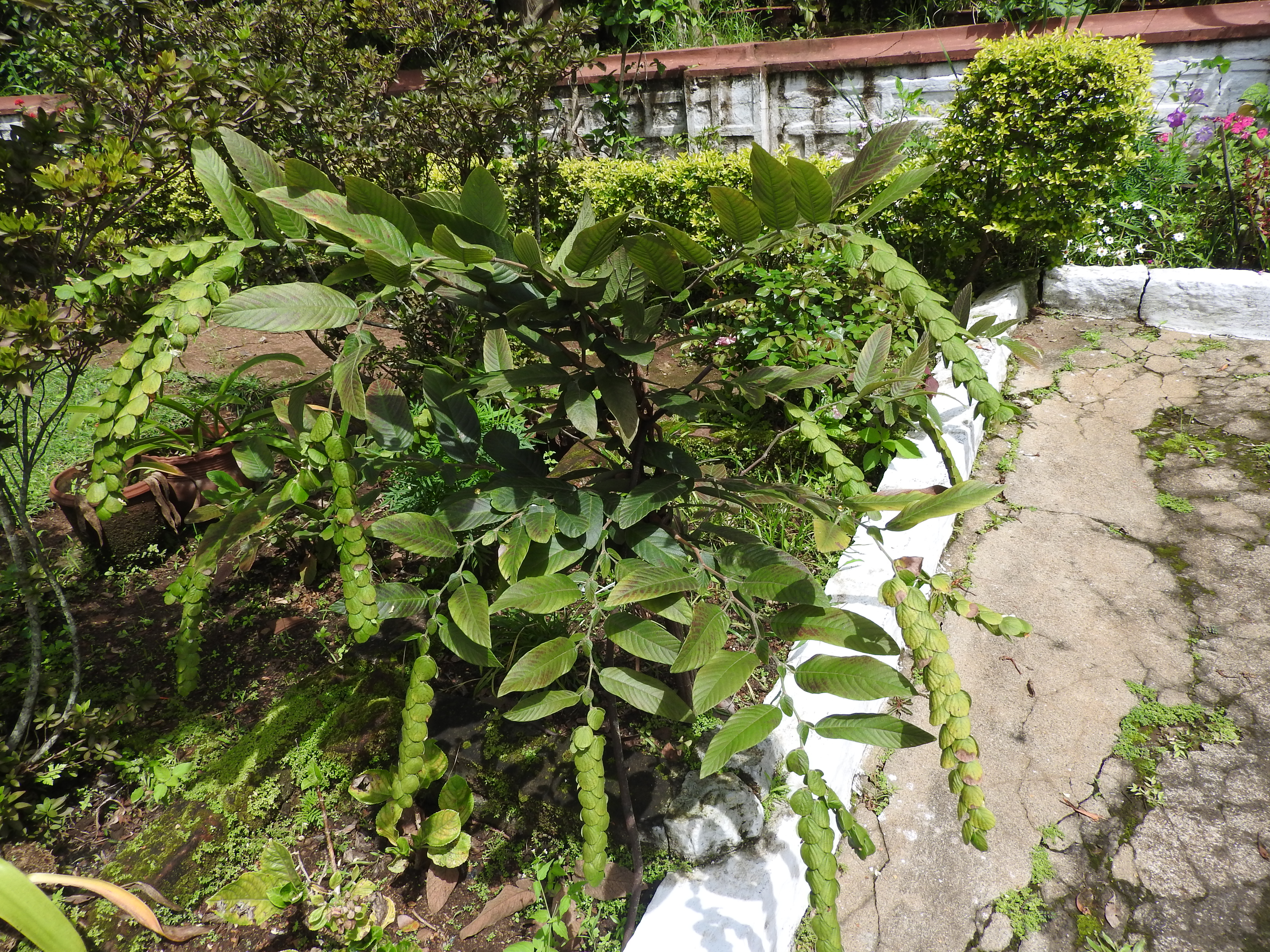

Scientific classification
- Kingdom: Plantae
- Clade: Embryophytes
- Clade: Tracheophytes
- Clade: Angiosperms
- Clade: Eudicots
- Clade: Rosids
- Order: Fabales
- Family: Fabaceae
- Subfamily: Faboideae
- Clade: Non-protein amino acid-accumulating clade
- Clade: Millettioids
- Tribe: Desmodieae
- Genus: Phyllodium
- Species: P. pulchellum

Binomial name
- Phyllodium pulchellum (L.) Desv.

Synonyms
- Desmodium pulchellum (L.) Benth.; Hedysarum pulchellum L. (basionym); Meibomia pulchella (L.)

= Phyllodium pulchellum =

Species of legume

Phyllodium pulchellum is an Asian plant in the family Fabaceae.

== Distribution and habitat ==
Phyllodium pulchellum is widely distributed in tropical Asia and also in the Ryukyu Islands, Taiwan and Australia's Northern Territory.

== Chemical composition ==
Plant: Bufotenin and 5-MeO-DMT, DMT and its oxides, gramine, 15 indole-3-alkylamines, tryptophan bases, β-carbolines
