= Catenaria =

Catenaria may refer to:

- An alternate spelling of catenary curve
- Catenaria Benth. 1852, a legume genus
- A fungal genus in Blastocladiales
