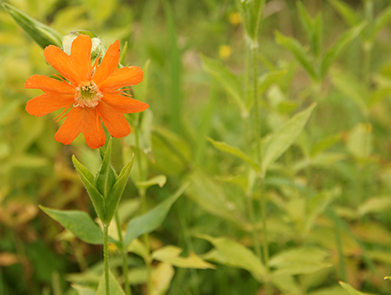
- Flower

Scientific classification
- Kingdom: Plantae
- Clade: Tracheophytes
- Clade: Angiosperms
- Clade: Eudicots
- Order: Caryophyllales
- Family: Caryophyllaceae
- Genus: Silene
- Species: S. cognata

Binomial name
- Silene cognata (Maxim.) H.Ohashi & H.Nakai

Synonyms
- Lychnis cognata Maxim.; Lychnis cognata f. albiflora W.Lee

= Silene cognata =

Species of plant in the carnation family

Silene cognata (syn. Lychnis cognata), the orange campion or orange catchfly, is a species of flowering plant in the family Caryophyllaceae, native to eastern and northern China, the Korean Peninsula, and Primorsky Krai in Russia. In the wild it is found in a wide variety of habitats, from 500 to 2,000 m (1,600 to 6,600 ft) above sea level. It is occasionally available from commercial suppliers, usually under its synonym Lychnis cognata. In Korea its leaves are harvested in the wild and sold in local markets as a food.
