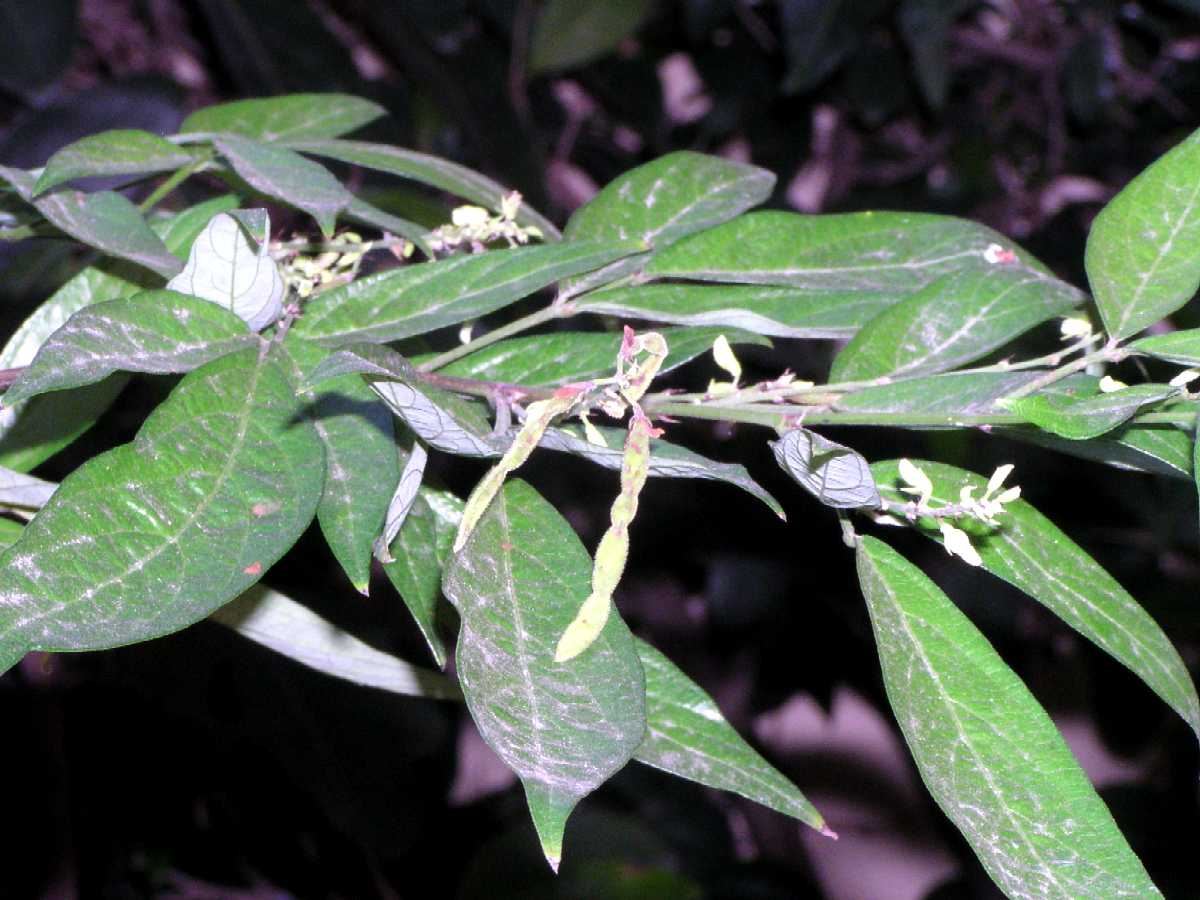
- Desmodium caudatum

Scientific classification
- Kingdom: Plantae
- Clade: Tracheophytes
- Clade: Angiosperms
- Clade: Eudicots
- Clade: Rosids
- Order: Fabales
- Family: Fabaceae
- Subfamily: Faboideae
- Tribe: Desmodieae
- Genus: Ohwia; H.Ohashi

Synonyms
- Catenaria Benth.

= Ohwia =

Genus of plant

Ohwia is a genus of plants in the family Fabaceae. Some botanists see it as a synonym of Desmodium. USDA GRIN has it listed as a probable synonym of Desmodium, but ILDIS LegumeWeb has it listed as its own genus.

Species accepted by Plants of the World Online as of March 2024:

- Ohwia caudata (Thunb.) H.Ohashi
- Ohwia luteola H.Ohashi
