= Verdesmum =

Scientific classification
- Kingdom: Plantae
- Clade: Embryophytes
- Clade: Tracheophytes
- Clade: Angiosperms
- Clade: Eudicots
- Clade: Rosids
- Order: Fabales
- Family: Fabaceae
- Genus: Verdesmum; H.Ohashi & K.Ohashi
- Species: V. hentyi

Binomial name
- Verdesmum hentyi (Verdc.) H.Ohashi & K.Ohashi

Synonyms
- Desmodium hentyi Verdc.; Hanslia hentyi (Verdc.) H.Ohashi

Genus of flowering plants

Verdesmum is a monotypic genus of flowering plants belonging to the family Fabaceae. It only contains one known species, Verdesmum hentyi. It is also within the tribe Desmodieae, with another species Verdesmum menglaense but this was transferred to the Hylodesmum genus in 2019.

It is native to Borneo and Papua New Guinea.

This genus was considered to be fairly similar to Hylodesmum H. Ohashi & R. R. Mill, but differed in having funnel-shaped terminal stigma, bracteolate (possessing bracteoles (or bractlets)) calyces (collective term for the sepals of one flower), linear shaped seed pods, very narrow obovate-elliptic shaped articles (fruit with constrictions between the seeds) and stipes longer than fruiting pedicels (stalks of a flower).

The genus name of Verdesmum is in honour of Bernard Verdcourt (1925–2011), an English biologist and taxonomist. The Latin specific epithet of hentyi refers to plant collector and botanist E.E. Henty, (1915–2002). Both the genus and the species were first described and published in J. Jap. Bot. Vol. 87 on page 301-303 in 2012.
