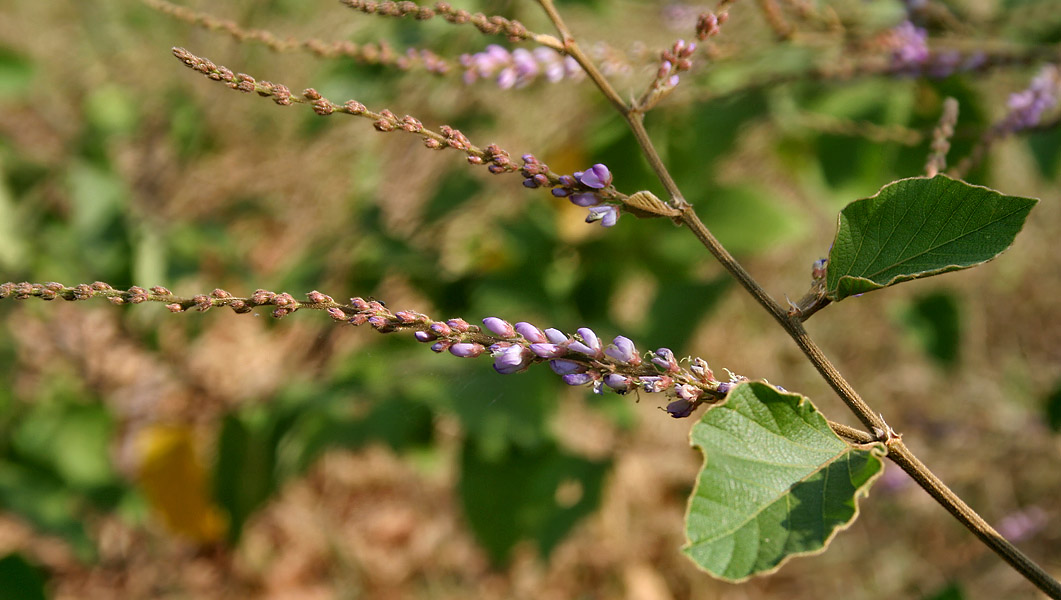
- Polhillides velutina (syn Desmodium velutinum) Andhra Pradesh, India.

Scientific classification
- Kingdom: Plantae
- Clade: Tracheophytes
- Clade: Angiosperms
- Clade: Eudicots
- Clade: Rosids
- Order: Fabales
- Family: Fabaceae
- Genus: Polhillides; H.Ohashi & K.Ohashi (2019)
- Species: P. velutina

Binomial name
- Polhillides velutina (Willd.) H.Ohashi & K.Ohashi (2019)

Subspecies and varieties
- see text

Synonyms
- Desmodium velutinum (Willd.) DC. (1825); Hedysarum velutinum Willd. (1802); Meibomia velutina (Willd.) Kuntze (1891)

= Polhillides =

Genus of flowering plants

Polhillides velutina is a species of flowering plant in the legume family, Fabaceae. It is the sole species in the genus Polhillides. It is an annual, perennial or sub-shrub, that is native to tropical regions of Africa and Madagascar, parts of Asia, New Guinea, and Australia (Northern Territory). In Africa, its habitats include woodland and grassland in the Sudanian region, wooded grassland and grassland in the Victoria Basin forest–savanna mosaic, and wooded grassland and grassland in the Somalia-Masai region. It is found at elevations of up to 1,320 m (4,330 ft) above sea level.

== Description ==
Polhillides velutina can be between 3.0–0.5 m (10–2 ft) tall. It has stems that have dense spreading ferrugineous (having the color of iron rust or reddish-brown) hairs when young, but hairless below. It has foliolate (leaflets) that have a large lamina (flat blade) and are 3.0–19 cm (1–7 in) long and 2–13 cm (1–5 in) wide. They are ovate to almost circular in shape, with almost flattened soft, short and erect hairs (on top) and velvet-like underneath. The petiole (leaf stem) is 1.5–3.5 mm (0–0 in) long. The flowers are terminal (end of stem) and axillary (at stem junctions) false racemes. They have lobes which are 1.5 mm long an come in shades of violet, lilac, red or blue. After flowering it produces a seed capsule of 2-7 sections, each having hooked hairs and 2.5–4 mm (0–0 in) long. Inside are brown seeds.

== Taxonomy ==
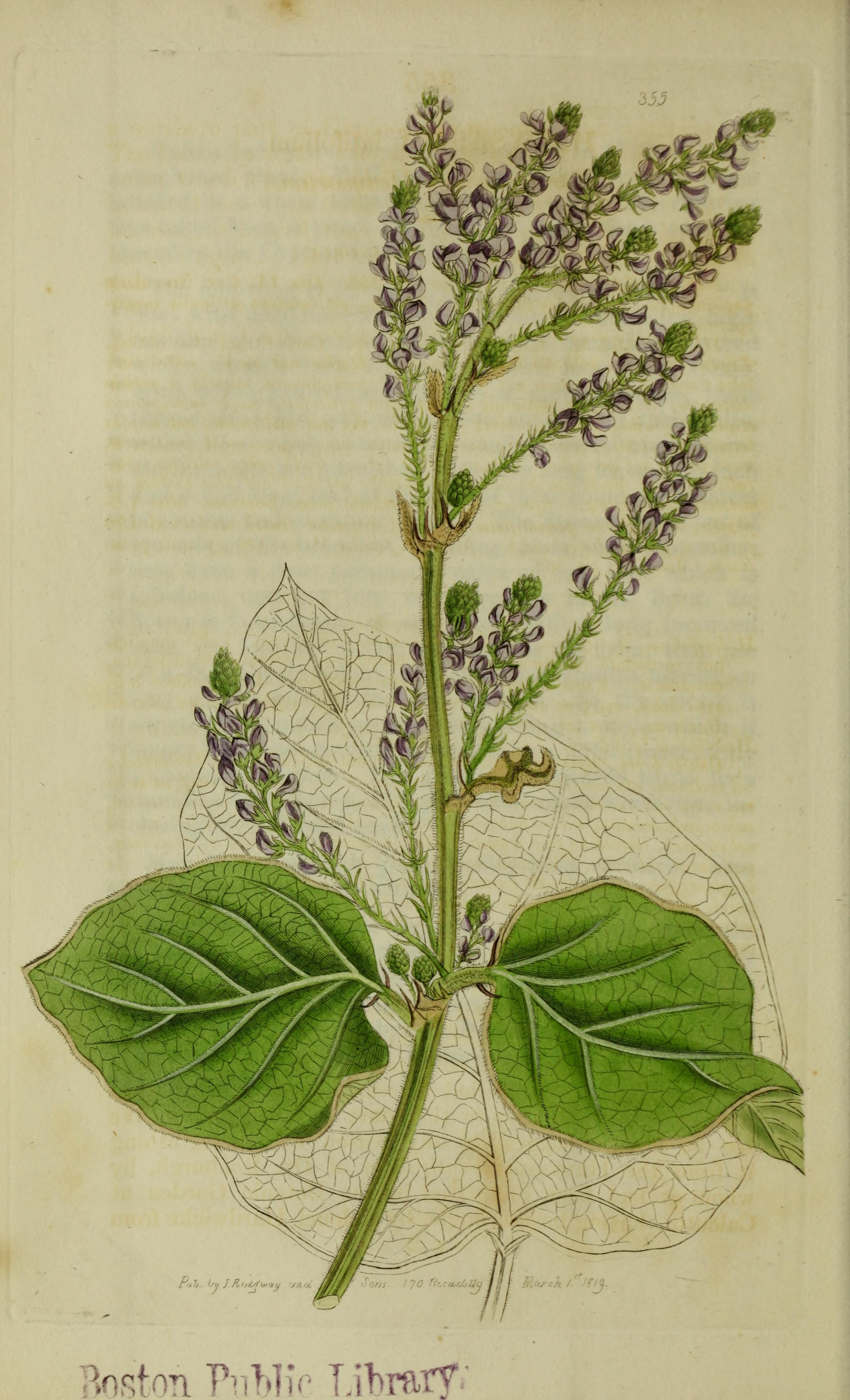
Illustration from 1815, The Botanical Register magazine, drawn by Sydenham Edwards

The genus name of Polhillides is in honour of Roger Marcus Polhill (b. 1937), an English botanist at Kew Gardens with a focus on Fabaceae. Who collected plants in Africa. He also wrote a book in 2001 'Flora of tropical East Africa'. The Latin specific epithet velutina refers to velvety,

The genus was circumscribed by Hiroyoshi Ohashi and Kazuaki Ohashi in J. Jap. Bot. vol.94 (Issue 2) on page 71 in 2019.

The United States Department of Agriculture and Agricultural Research Service regard the species as a possible synonym of Hedysarum L with no species listed.

== Subspecies ==
Three subspecies or varieties are accepted:

- Polhillides velutina subsp. longibracteata (Schindl.) H.Ohashi & K.Ohashi
- Polhillides velutina var. sikkimensis (Schindl.) H.Ohashi & K.Ohashi
- Polhillides velutina subsp. velutina

== Distribution ==
It is found in Andaman Islands, Angola, Assam, Bangladesh, Benin, Bismarck Archipelago, Burkina, Burundi, Cambodia, Cameroon, Central African Republic, Chad, China, Congo, East Himalayas, Ethiopia, Gabon, Gambia, Ghana, Guinea, Guinea-Bissau, Gulf of Guinea Island, Hainan, India, Ivory Coast, Java, Kenya, Laos, Lesser Sunda Islands, Liberia, Malawi, Malaya, Mali, Mauritius, Mozambique, Myanmar, Nepal, New Guinea, Niger, Nigeria, Northern Provinces (part of South Africa), Northern Territory (Australia), Philippines, Rwanda, Senegal, Sierra Leone, Sri Lanka, Sudan, Sulawesi, Sumatra, Taiwan, Tanzania, Thailand, Togo, Uganda, Vietnam, West Himalaya, Zambia, Zaïre and Zimbabwe.
