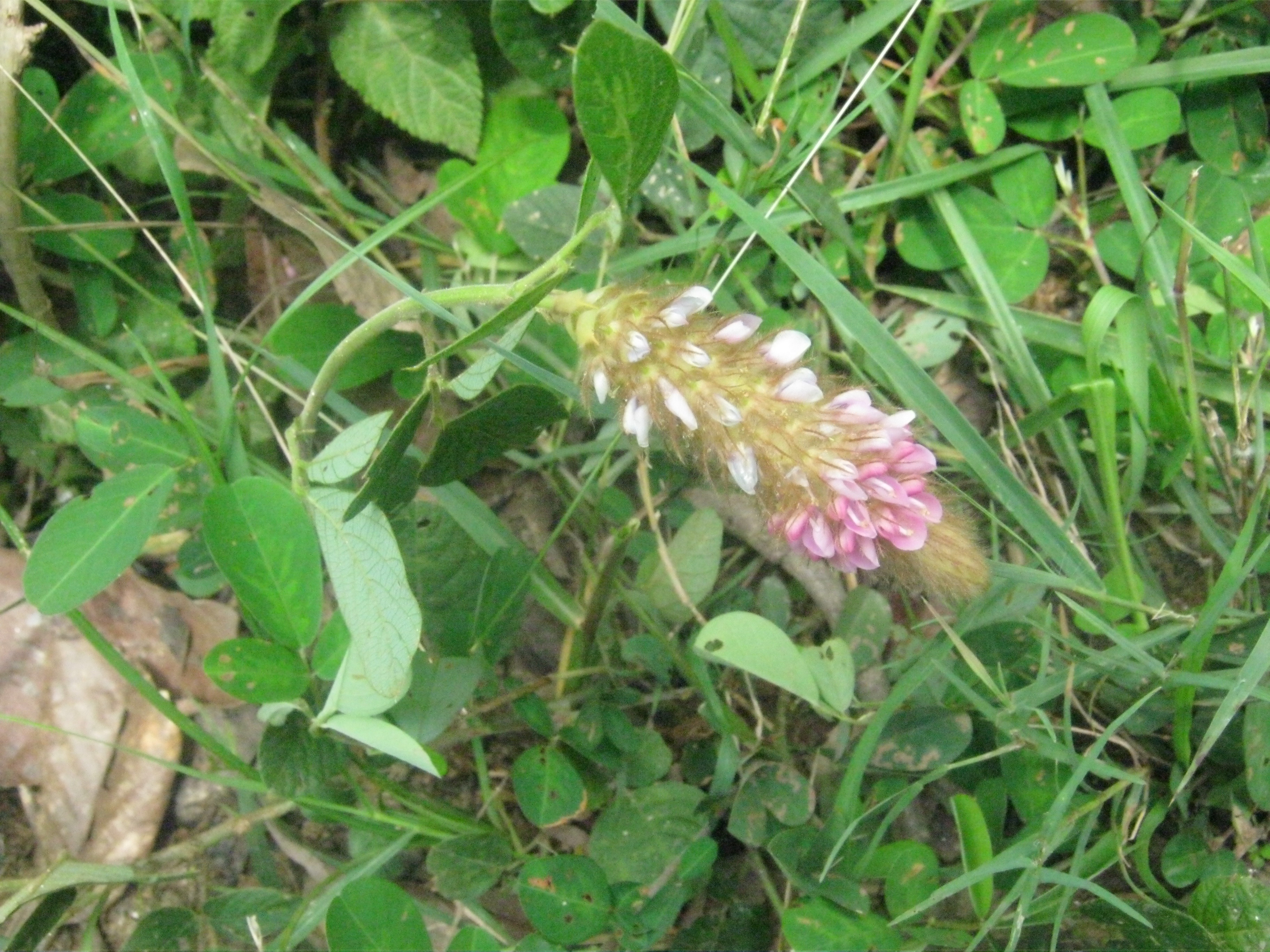

Scientific classification
- Kingdom: Plantae
- Clade: Tracheophytes
- Clade: Angiosperms
- Clade: Eudicots
- Clade: Rosids
- Order: Fabales
- Family: Fabaceae
- Subfamily: Faboideae
- Genus: Uraria
- Species: U. lagopodioides

Binomial name
- Uraria lagopodioides (L.) DC.

= Uraria lagopodioides =

Species of flowering plant

Uraria lagopodioides is a species of flowering plant in the family Fabaceae. The species is native to East Asia, South Asia, Southeast Asia, Australia, and Papua New Guinea. The species has been introduced to Niue and Tonga.
