= Desmodiastrum =

Scientific classification
- Kingdom: Plantae
- Clade: Tracheophytes
- Clade: Angiosperms
- Clade: Eudicots
- Clade: Rosids
- Order: Fabales
- Family: Fabaceae
- Subfamily: Faboideae
- Tribe: Desmodieae
- Subtribe: Desmodiinae
- Genus: Desmodiastrum (Prain) A. Pramanik & Thoth. (1986)

Species
- Desmodiastrum belgaumense (Wight) A.Pramanik & Thoth.; Desmodiastrum parviflorum (Dalzell) H.Ohashi; Desmodiastrum racemosum (Benth.) A.Pramanik & Thoth.

Genus of legumes

Desmodiastrum is a genus of flowering plants in the family Fabaceae. It belongs to the subfamily Faboideae and is found in India. The genus includes three species of annuals which are native to India, Myanmar, and Java.

- Desmodiastrum belgaumense (Wight) A.Pramanik & Thoth. – western India
- Desmodiastrum parviflorum (Dalzell) H.Ohashi – India, Myanmar, and eastern Java
- Desmodiastrum racemosum (Benth.) A.Pramanik & Thoth. – India
