= Tadehagi =

Scientific classification
- Kingdom: Plantae
- Clade: Tracheophytes
- Clade: Angiosperms
- Clade: Eudicots
- Clade: Rosids
- Order: Fabales
- Family: Fabaceae
- Subfamily: Faboideae
- Tribe: Desmodieae
- Genus: Tadehagi; H.Ohashi (1973)

Species
- 6; see text

Synonyms
- Pteroloma Desv. ex Benth. (1852), nom illeg.

Genus of legumes

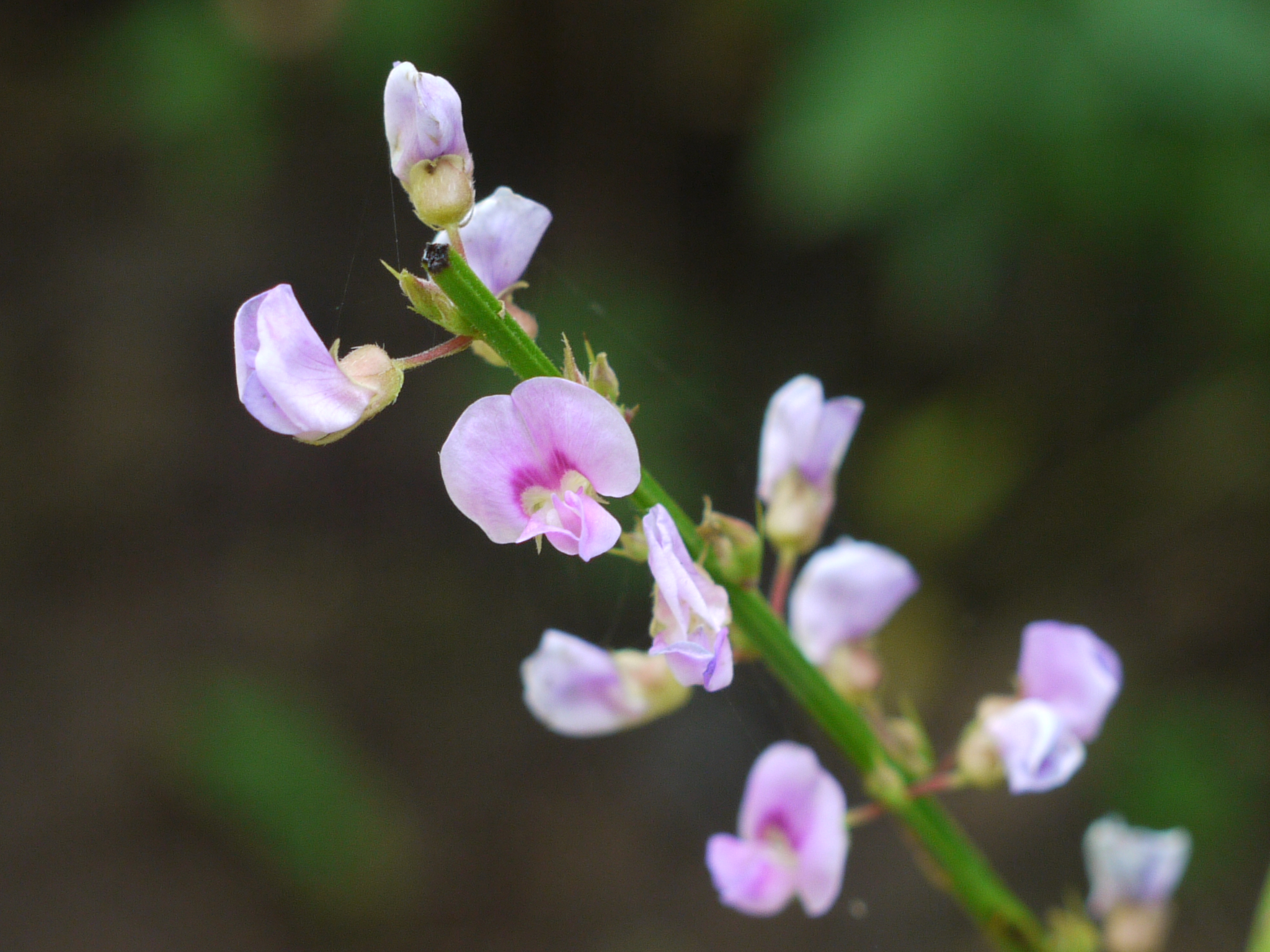
Tadehagi triquetrum

Tadehagi is a genus of flowering plants in the legume family, Fabaceae. It includes six species of subshrubs and shrubs native to the Indian subcontinent, Indochina, southern China, the Philippines, New Guinea, and Western Australia. Five of the six species are native to India and Indochina, and one (T. robustum) is endemic to Western Australia. Typical habitats include seasonally-dry tropical and subtropical forest, scrub, and grassland, including rocky and riparian areas. It belongs to the subfamily Faboideae.

== Species ==
- Tadehagi ademae H.Ohashi & K.Ohashi
- Tadehagi alatum (DC.) H.Ohashi
- Tadehagi pseudotriquetrum (DC.) H.Ohashi
- Tadehagi robustum Pedley
- Tadehagi rodgeri (Schindl.) H.Ohashi
- Tadehagi triquetrum (L.) H.Ohashi
