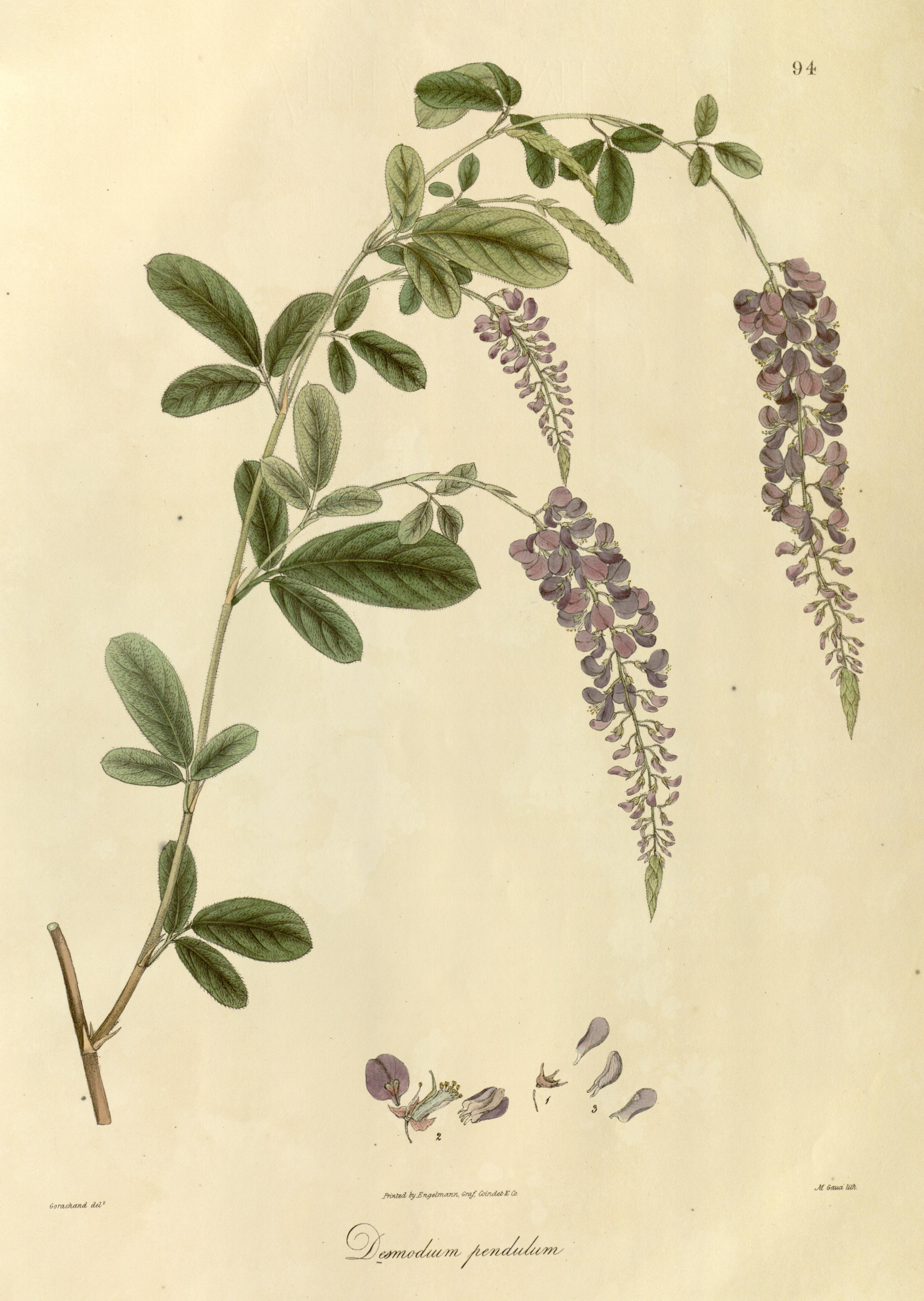

Scientific classification
- Kingdom: Plantae
- Clade: Tracheophytes
- Clade: Angiosperms
- Clade: Eudicots
- Clade: Rosids
- Order: Fabales
- Family: Fabaceae
- Subfamily: Faboideae
- Genus: Tateishia
- Species: T. concinna

Binomial name
- Tateishia concinna (DC.) H.Ohashi & K.Ohashi

Synonyms
- Desmodium amoenum Benth.; Desmodium barbigerum H.Lev.; Desmodium barbigerum H.Lév.; Desmodium concinnum DC.; Desmodium penduliflorum Benth.; Desmodium pendulum Wall.; Meibomia concinna (DC.) Kuntze

= Tateishia concinna =

Species of legume

Tateishia concinna is an ornamental plant in the family Fabaceae. Formerly considered part of the genus Desmodium, recent work (2018) places it into a new genus, Tateishia, along with one other species, Tateishia retusa.
