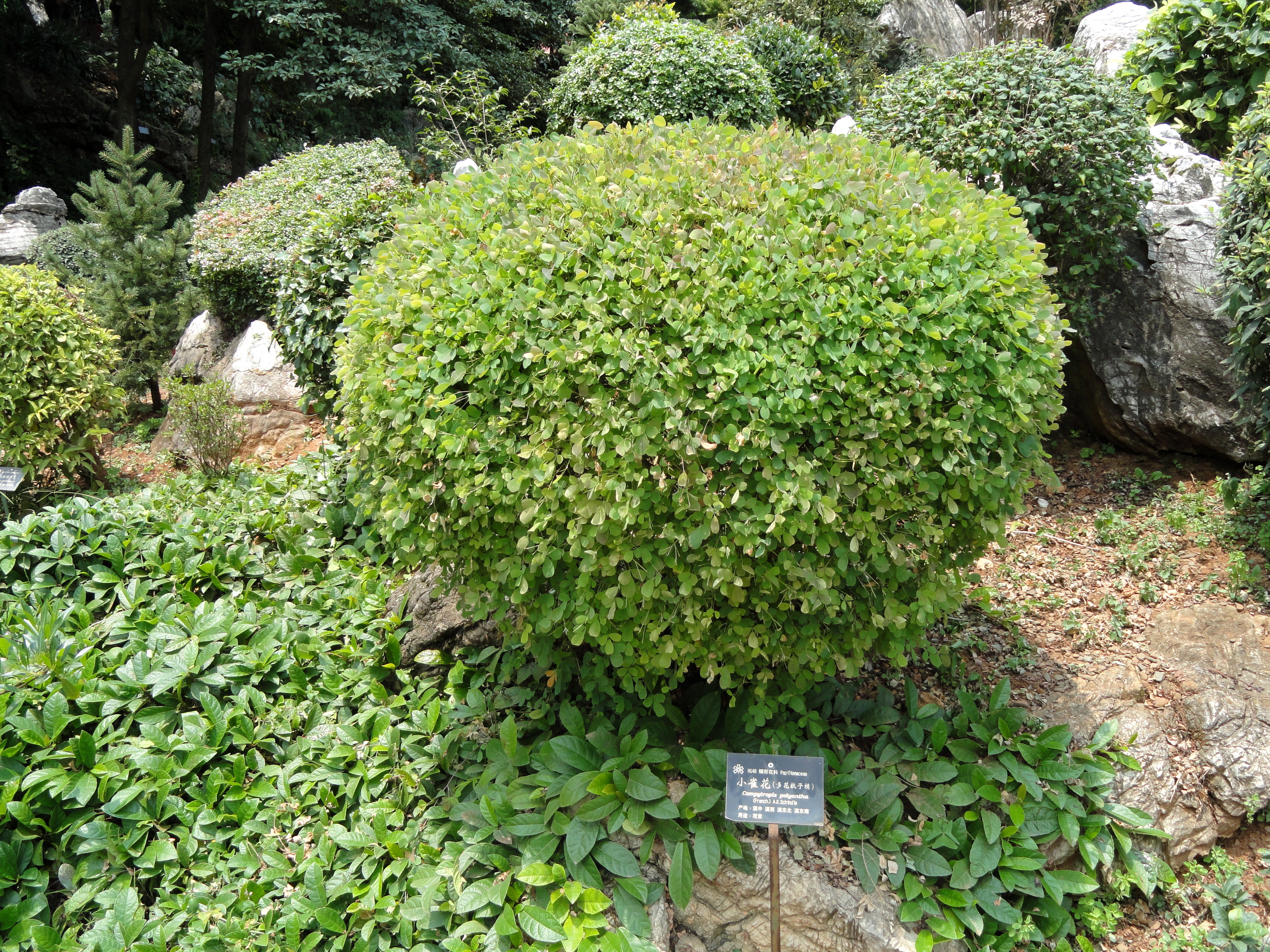
- Campylotropis polyantha

Scientific classification
- Kingdom: Plantae
- Clade: Tracheophytes
- Clade: Angiosperms
- Clade: Eudicots
- Clade: Rosids
- Order: Fabales
- Family: Fabaceae
- Subfamily: Faboideae
- Tribe: Desmodieae
- Subtribe: Lespedezinae
- Genus: Campylotropis; Bunge (1835)

Species
- 41; see text

Synonyms
- Oxyramphis Wall. ex Meisn. (1838); Phlebosporum Jungh. (1845)

= Campylotropis =

Genus of legumes

Campylotropis is a genus of flowering plants in the legume family, Fabaceae. It includes 41 species of shrubs native to Asia, ranging from the Himalayas to Indochina, China, Taiwan, Mongolia, and Korea, as well as Java and the Lesser Sunda Islands. Typical habitats include seasonally-dry tropical montane forests to temperate forest, woodland, and bushland. The genus belongs to subfamily Faboideae.

== Species ==
41 species are accepted.

- Campylotropis alba Schindl. ex Iokawa & H.Ohashi
- Campylotropis albopubescens (Iokawa & H.Ohashi) M.Liao & Bo Xu
- Campylotropis alopochloa H.Ohashi
- Campylotropis argentea Schindl.
- Campylotropis bonii Schindl.
- Campylotropis brevifolia Ricker
- Campylotropis burmanica H.Ohashi
- Campylotropis capillipes (Franch.) Schindl.
- Campylotropis cytisoides (Jungh.) Miq.
- Campylotropis decora (Kurz) Schindl.
- Campylotropis delavayi (Franch.) Schindl.
- Campylotropis diversifolia (Hemsl.) Schindl.
- Campylotropis falconeri (Prain) Schindl.
- Campylotropis fulva Schindl.
- Campylotropis grandifolia Schindl.
- Campylotropis griffithii Schindl.
- Campylotropis harmsii Schindl.
- Campylotropis henryi (Schindl.) Schindl.
- Campylotropis hirtella (Franch.) Schindl.
- Campylotropis howellii Schindl.
- Campylotropis latifolia (Dunn) Schindl.
- Campylotropis luhitensis H.Ohashi
- Campylotropis luquanensis Bo Xu & L.S.Jiang
- Campylotropis macrocarpa (Bunge) Rehder
- Campylotropis macrostyla (D.Don) Lindl. ex Miq.
- Campylotropis microphylla Aver.
- Campylotropis parviflora (Kurz) Schindl.
- Campylotropis pauciflora C.J.Chen
- Campylotropis pinetorum (Kurz) Schindl.
- Campylotropis polyantha (Franch.) Schindl.
- Campylotropis sargentiana Schindl.
- Campylotropis speciosa (Royle ex Schindl.) Schindl.
- Campylotropis stenocarpa (Klotzsch) Schindl.
- Campylotropis sulcata Schindl.
- Campylotropis tenuiramea P.Y.Fu
- Campylotropis teretiracemosa P.C.Li & C.J.Chen
- Campylotropis thomsonii (Benth. ex Baker) Schindl.
- Campylotropis trigonoclada (Franch.) Schindl.
- Campylotropis wenshanica P.Y.Fu
- Campylotropis wilsonii Schindl.
- Campylotropis yunnanensis (Franch.) Schindl.
