= Akschindlium =

Scientific classification
- Kingdom: Plantae
- Clade: Tracheophytes
- Clade: Angiosperms
- Clade: Eudicots
- Clade: Rosids
- Order: Fabales
- Family: Fabaceae
- Subfamily: Faboideae
- Tribe: Desmodieae
- Genus: Akschindlium; H.Ohashi
- Species: A. godefroyanum

Binomial name
- Akschindlium godefroyanum (Kuntze) H.Ohashi

Genus of flowering plants

Akschindlium is a genus of flowering plants belonging to the family Fabaceae. The only species is Akschindlium godefroyanum.

Its native range is Indo-China.
