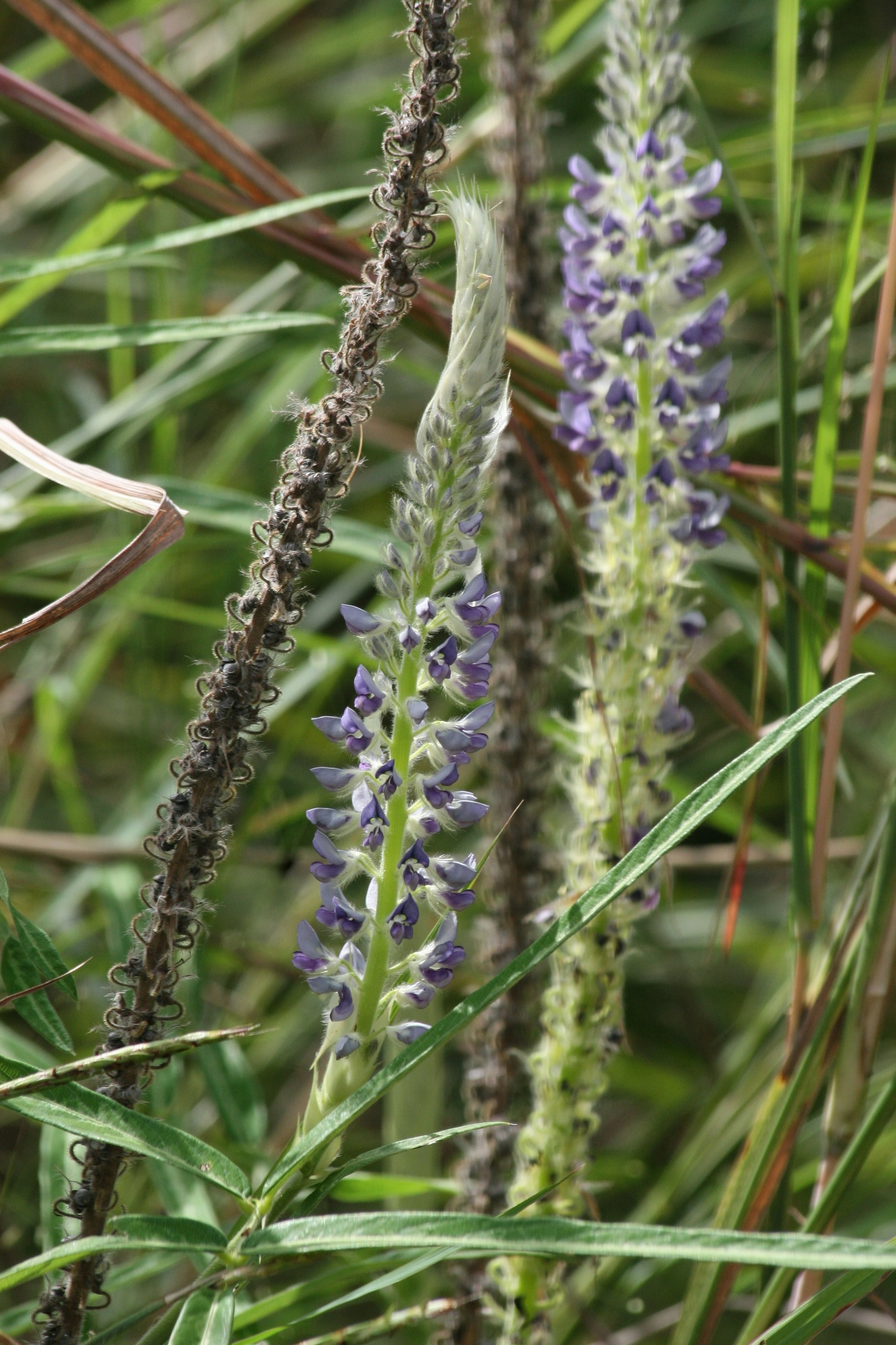

Scientific classification
- Kingdom: Plantae
- Clade: Tracheophytes
- Clade: Angiosperms
- Clade: Eudicots
- Clade: Rosids
- Order: Fabales
- Family: Fabaceae
- Subfamily: Faboideae
- Genus: Uraria
- Species: U. picta

Binomial name
- Uraria picta (Jacq.) Desv. ex DC.

Synonyms
- Desmodium pictum (Jacq.) Walp.; Doodia picta Roxb.; Hedysarum pictum Jacq.; Uraria leucantha Zipp. ex Span.; Uraria linearis Hassk.; Uraria picta var. paucifoliata Domin

= Uraria picta =

Species of flowering plant

Uraria picta, also known by its common name Prishniparni is a species from the genus Uraria. The species was described in 1825.
