= Pycnospora =

Scientific classification
- Kingdom: Plantae
- Clade: Tracheophytes
- Clade: Angiosperms
- Clade: Eudicots
- Clade: Rosids
- Order: Fabales
- Family: Fabaceae
- Subfamily: Faboideae
- Tribe: Desmodieae
- Subtribe: Desmodiinae
- Genus: Pycnospora; R.Br. ex Wight & Arn. (1834)
- Species: P. lutescens

Binomial name
- Pycnospora lutescens (Poir.) Schindl. (1926)

Synonyms
- Synonymy: Colutea trifoliata (L.) Poir. (1811); Crotalaria nallamalayana Rasingam & J.Swamy (2018); Crotalaria nervosa Graham (1831), nom. nud.; Crotalaria tappenbeckiana K.Schum. & Lauterb. (1900); Desmodium lutescens (Poir.) DC. (1825); Desmodium viride Vogel (1843); Flemingia polysperma Moon (1824); Hedysarum lutescens Poir. (1805); Indigofera desmodioides Benth. ex Baker (1876), not validly publ.; Meibomia lutescens (Poir.) Kuntze (1891); Meibomia viridis (Vogel) Kuntze (1891); Phaca trifoliata L. (1771), nom. utique rej.; Phyllodium lutescens (Poir.) Desv. (1813); Pycnospora hedysaroides Benth. (1864), nom. superfl.; Pycnospora nervosa Wight & Arn. (1834); Zornia lutescens (Poir.) Steud. (1821)

Genus of legumes

Pycnospora lutescens is a species of flowering plant in the legume family, Fabaceae. It is a subshrub or perennial native to east-central tropical Africa, tropical and subtropical Asia, eastern Malesia, and northern Australia. It is the sole species in genus Pycnospora. It belongs to the subfamily Faboideae.

In Africa, Pycnospora lutescens grows in woodland, bushland, grassland, and thicket in the Victoria Basin forest–savanna mosaic, and woodland, bushland, and thicket in the Somali-Masai region of Kenya and Tanzania.
