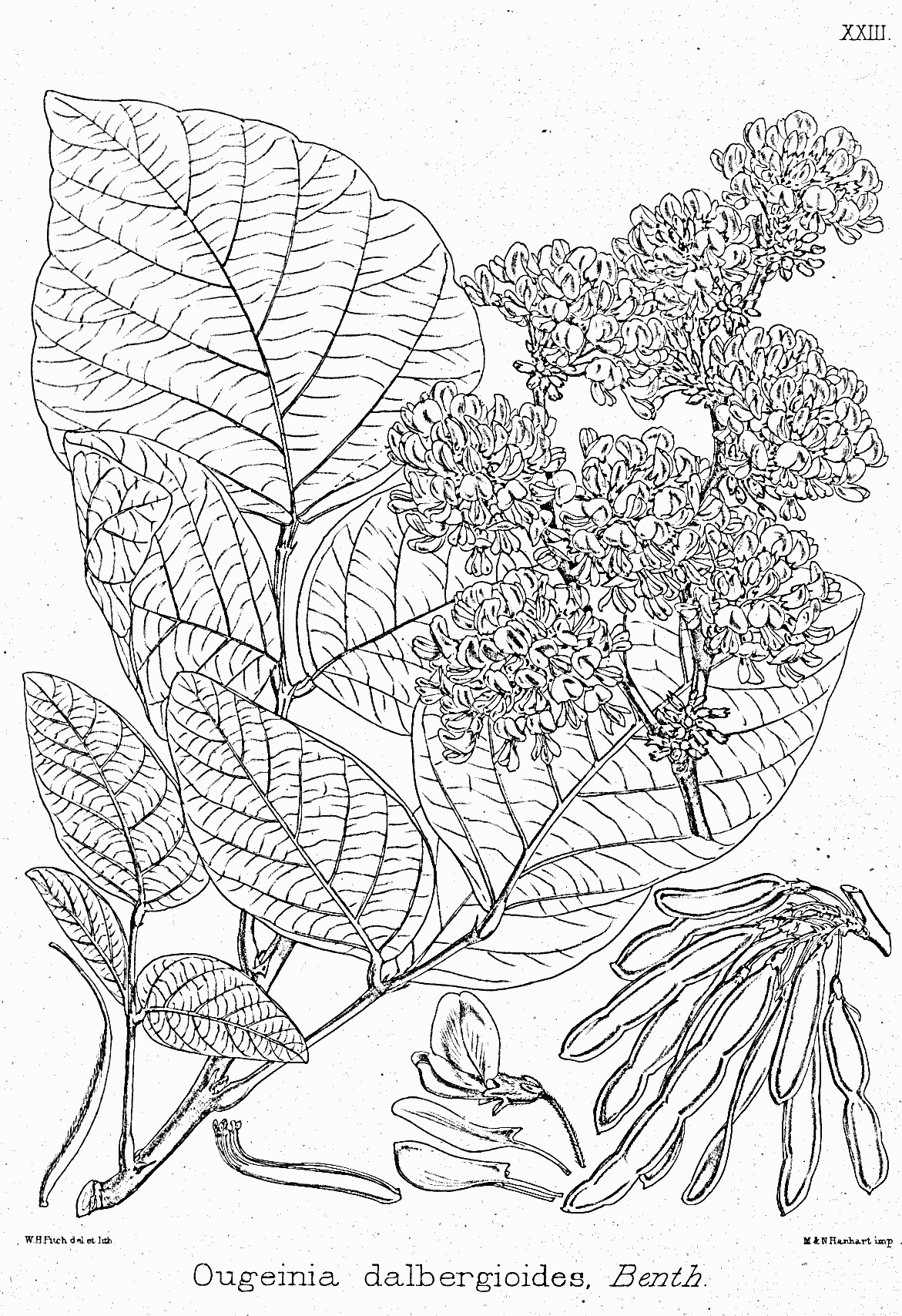

Scientific classification
- Kingdom: Plantae
- Clade: Tracheophytes
- Clade: Angiosperms
- Clade: Eudicots
- Clade: Rosids
- Order: Fabales
- Family: Fabaceae
- Subfamily: Faboideae
- Clade: Millettioids
- Tribe: Desmodieae
- Genus: Ougeinia; Benth.
- Species: O. oojeinensis

Binomial name
- Ougeinia oojeinensis (Roxb.) Hochr.

Synonyms
- Dalbergia oojeinensis Roxb.; Dalbergia ougeinensis Roxb.; Desmodium oojeinense (Roxb.) H.Ohashi; Ougeinia dalbergioides Benth.

= Ougeinia =

Species of legume

Ougeinia oojeinense, the Ujjain desmodium tree or sandan (also known as Desmodium oojeinense), is a flowering tree native to India and Nepal, and the only species in the genus Ougeinia. It usually grows 6–12 meters tall. Its leaves are quite large and trifoliate, with rigid, leathery leaflets. It can be identified by the dark brown, deeply cracked bark and the crooked trunk. The pink flowers bloom between February and May. The fruit is a linear, flat pod, light brown in colour. It is an introduced species in Pakistan.
