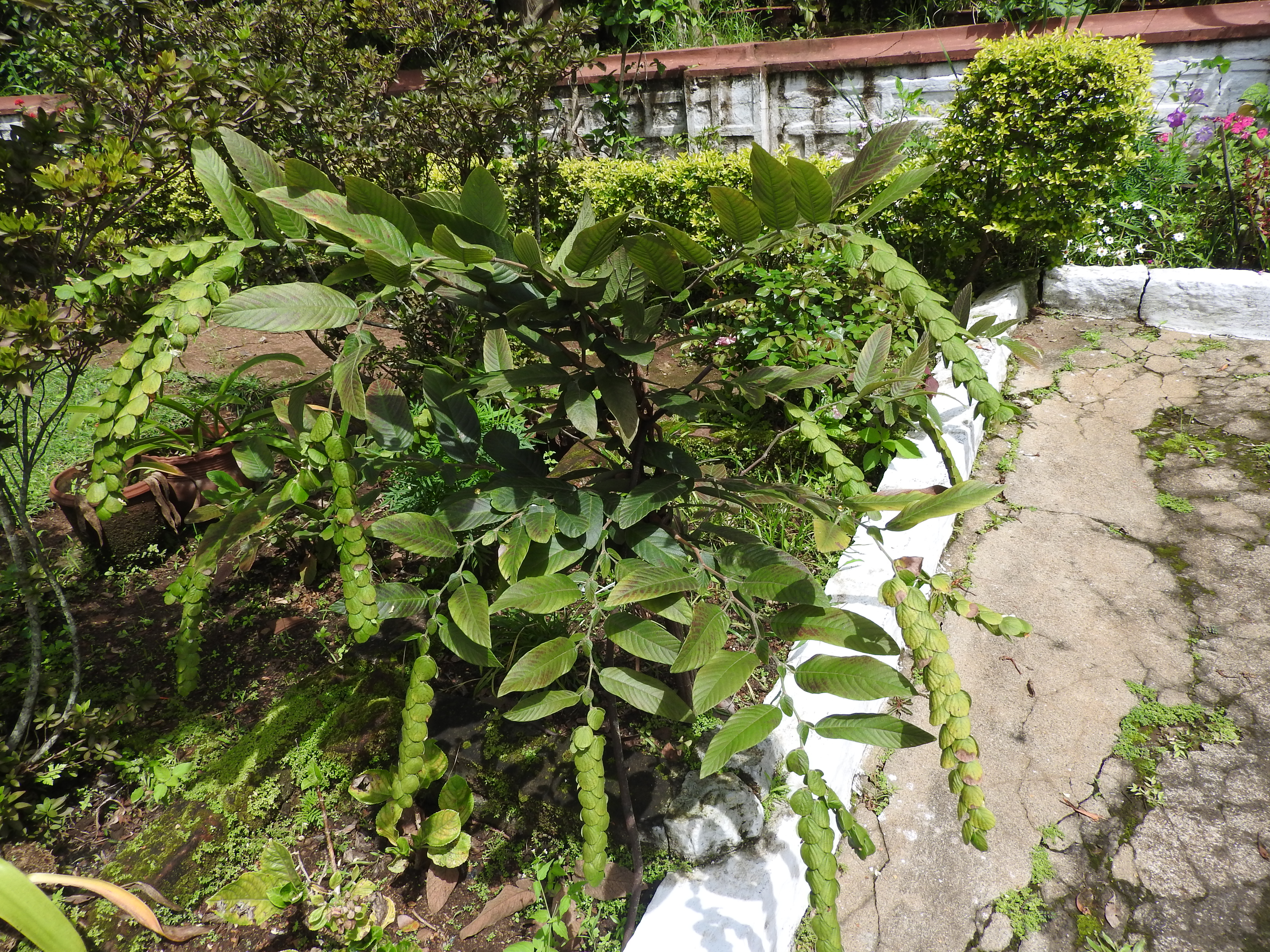
- Phyllodium pulchellum

Scientific classification
- Kingdom: Plantae
- Clade: Tracheophytes
- Clade: Angiosperms
- Clade: Eudicots
- Clade: Rosids
- Order: Fabales
- Family: Fabaceae
- Subfamily: Faboideae
- Clade: Non-protein amino acid-accumulating clade
- Clade: Millettioids
- Tribe: Desmodieae
- Genus: Phyllodium; Desv.

= Phyllodium =

Genus of legumes

Phyllodium is a genus of flowering plants in the family Fabaceae, in the subfamily Faboideae, tribe Desmodieae and subtribe Desmodiinae. Species are found in tropical and subtropical Asia through to northern Australia.

== Species ==
As of March 2023 Plants of the World Online includes:

- Phyllodium elegans (Lour.) Desv.
- Phyllodium hackeri Pedley
- Phyllodium insigne Schindl.
- Phyllodium kurzianum (Kuntze) H.Ohashi
- Phyllodium longipes (Craib) Schindl.
- Phyllodium pulchellum (L.) Desv.
- Phyllodium vestitum Benth.
