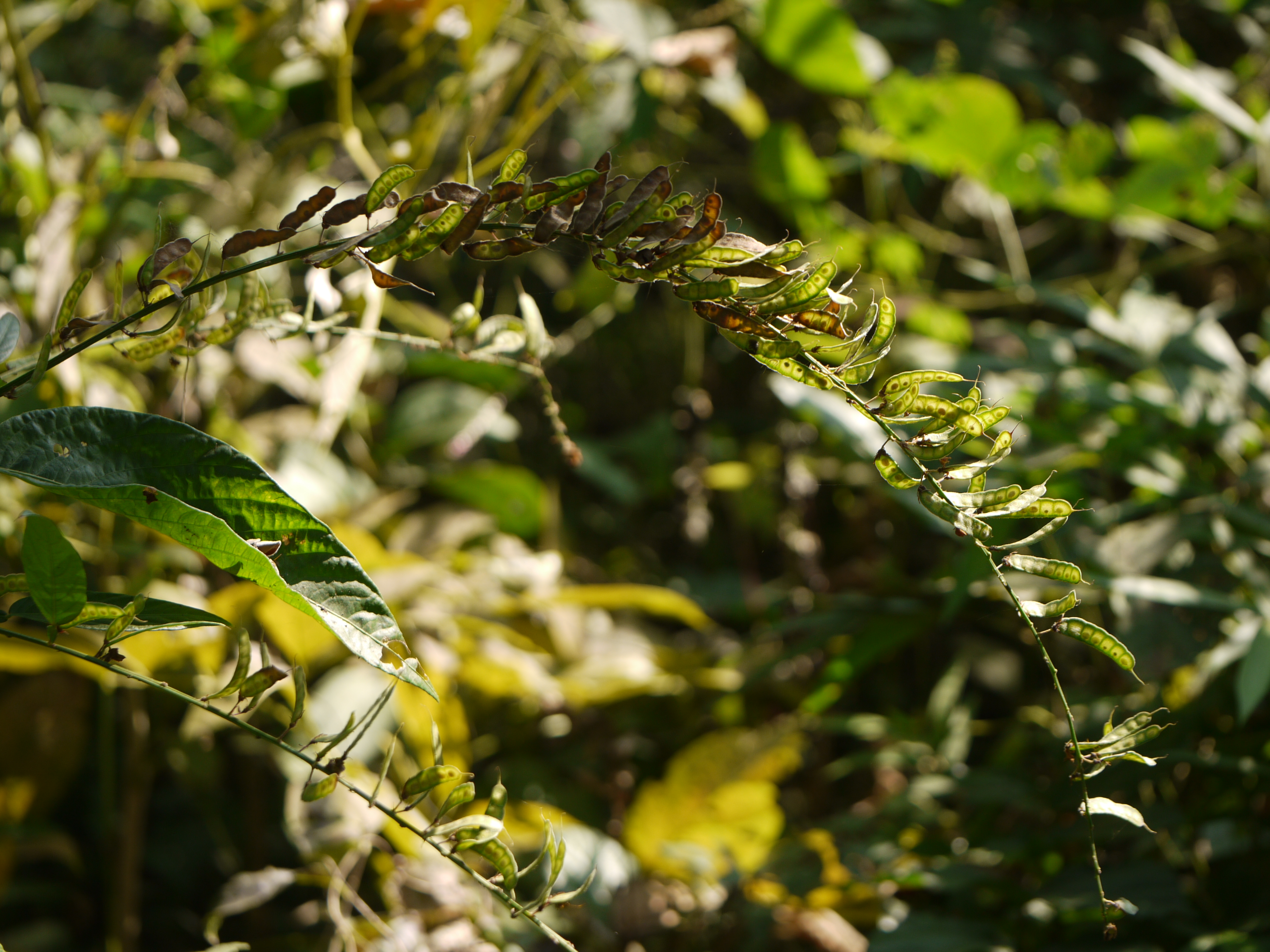

Scientific classification
- Kingdom: Plantae
- Clade: Tracheophytes
- Clade: Angiosperms
- Clade: Eudicots
- Clade: Rosids
- Order: Fabales
- Family: Fabaceae
- Subfamily: Faboideae
- Genus: Tadehagi
- Species: T. triquetrum

Binomial name
- Tadehagi triquetrum (L.) H. Ohashi

Synonyms
- Desmodium triquetrum (L.) DC.; Desmodium triquetrum subsp. genuinum Prain; Desmodium triquetrum subsp. triquetrum; Hedysarum triquetrum L.; Meibomia triquetra (L.) Kuntze; Pteroloma triquetrum (L.) Benth.; Tadehagi triquetrum subsp. triquetrum

= Tadehagi triquetrum =

Species of legume

Tadehagi triquetrum is a species of flowering plant in the family Fabaceae. It belongs to the subfamily Faboideae. The species has two subspecies with the nominate one, but sometimes they given full species status by some authors. The maximum height of this shrub tree is 3m. Leaves alternate, linear-oblong, ovate with a tapering tip. Flowers show raceme inflorescence type, which are small, pale purplish in color. The fruit is a hairy legume. It is widespread in all South Asian, East Asian, and Southeast Asian countries.

== Subspecies ==
- Tadehagi triquetrum subsp. alatum (DC.) H.Ohashi
- Tadehagi triquetrum subsp. auriculatum (DC.) H.Ohashi

== Common names ==
- Assamese - Ulucha
- Kannada - Dodotte, Molada gida
- Malayalam - Adkhapanal, Chattagai, Kattarali
- Marathi - Kak Ganja (काक गांजा )
- Mizo - Arhrikreh
- Myanmar(Burma) - လောက်သေရွက်,လောက်မင်းရွက်, ရွှေဘူသံလျှက်
- Sinhalese - Bâloliyâ (බාලොලියා)
- Telugu - Dammidi (దమ్మిడి )
- Thai - Khao Mao Nok (ข้าวเม่านก)
- Vietnamese - cây Cổ bình, cây Mũi mác
