= Bouffordia =

Scientific classification
- Kingdom: Plantae
- Clade: Tracheophytes
- Clade: Angiosperms
- Clade: Eudicots
- Clade: Rosids
- Order: Fabales
- Family: Fabaceae
- Subfamily: Faboideae
- Tribe: Desmodieae
- Genus: Bouffordia; H.Ohashi & K.Ohashi
- Species: B. dichotoma

Binomial name
- Bouffordia dichotoma (Willd.) H.Ohashi & K.Ohashi

Genus of flowering plants

Bouffordia is a genus of flowering plants belonging to the family Fabaceae. The only species is Bouffordia dichotoma.

Its native range is Oman to China (Southern Yunnan) and Malesia.
