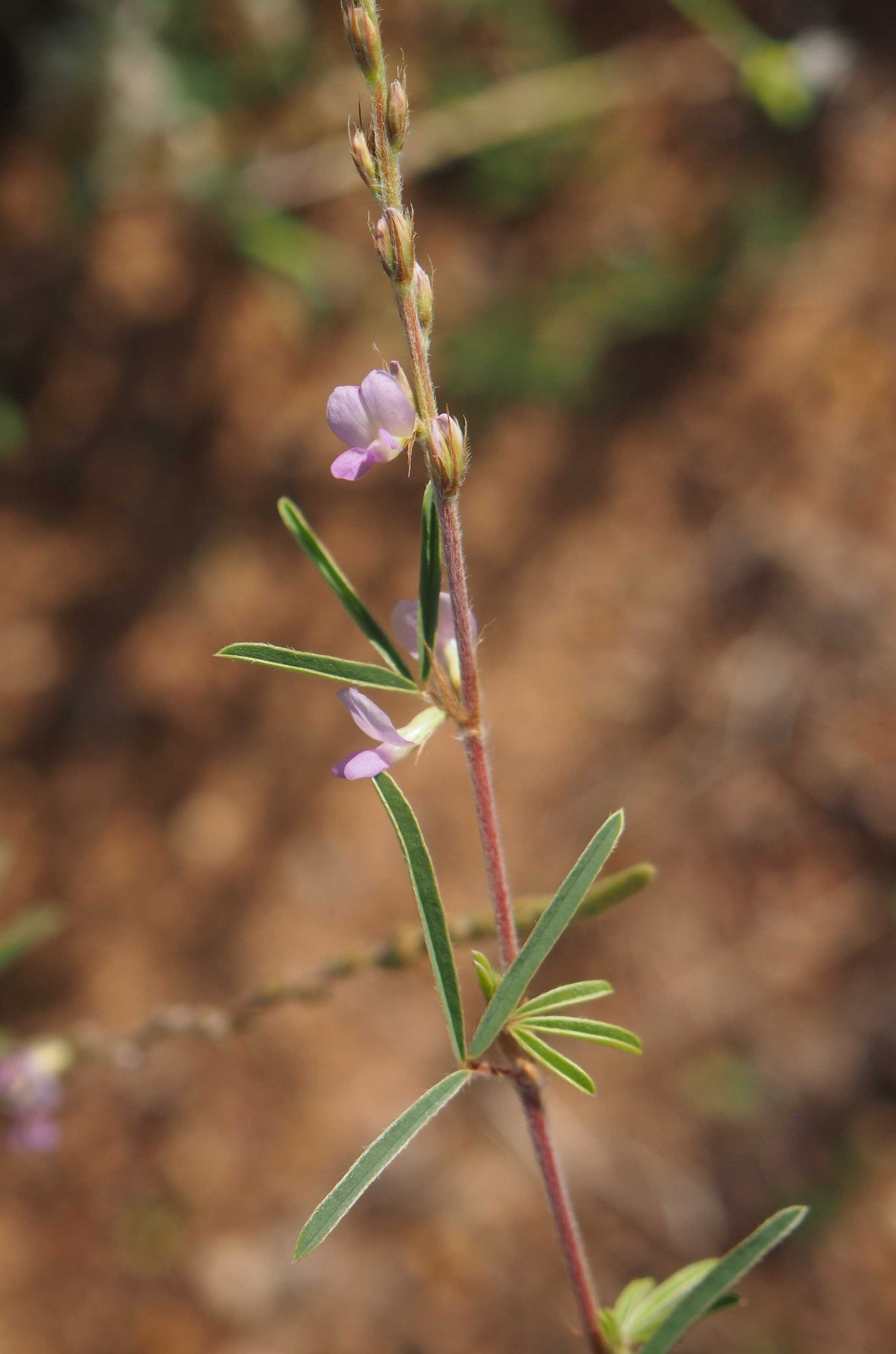

Scientific classification
- Kingdom: Plantae
- Clade: Tracheophytes
- Clade: Angiosperms
- Clade: Eudicots
- Clade: Rosids
- Order: Fabales
- Family: Fabaceae
- Subfamily: Faboideae
- Tribe: Desmodieae
- Genus: Aphyllodium (DC.) Gagnep.

Synonyms
- Dicerma DC.

= Aphyllodium =

Genus of legumes

Aphyllodium is a genus of flowering plants in the family Fabaceae. It belongs to the subfamily Faboideae. Members of the genus are found in various parts of Australia, South Asia, Southeastern Asia, and south China.

== Species ==
Species accepted by Plants of the World Online as of March 2024:

- Aphyllodium australiense (Schindl.) H.Ohashi
- Aphyllodium beardii R.L.Barrett
- Aphyllodium biarticulatum (L.) Gagnep.
- Aphyllodium glossocarpum Pedley
- Aphyllodium hispidum (Schindl.) H.Ohashi
- Aphyllodium latifolium Pedley
- Aphyllodium parvifolium Pedley
- Aphyllodium stylosanthoides Pedley
