= Huangtcia =

Scientific classification
- Kingdom: Plantae
- Clade: Tracheophytes
- Clade: Angiosperms
- Clade: Eudicots
- Clade: Rosids
- Order: Fabales
- Family: Fabaceae
- Genus: Huangtcia; H.Ohashi & K.Ohashi (2018)

Species
- Huangtcia oblata (Baker ex Kurz) H.Ohashi & K.Ohashi; Huangtcia renifolia (L.) H.Ohashi & K.Ohashi

Genus of flowering plants

Huangtcia is a genus of flowering plants in the legume family, Fabaceae. It includes two species of shrubs or subshrubs native to southeastern Asia, ranging from Nepal through eastern India and Indochina to south-central China, and to Hainan, Taiwan, and Java.
