= Mecopus (plant) =

Conservation status
- Least Concern (IUCN 3.1)

Scientific classification
- Kingdom: Plantae
- Clade: Tracheophytes
- Clade: Angiosperms
- Clade: Eudicots
- Clade: Rosids
- Order: Fabales
- Family: Fabaceae
- Subfamily: Faboideae
- Genus: Mecopus; Benn. (1840)
- Species: M. nidulans

Binomial name
- Mecopus nidulans Benn. (1840)

Synonyms
- Uraria retrofracta Wall. (1831), not validly publ.

Genus of plants

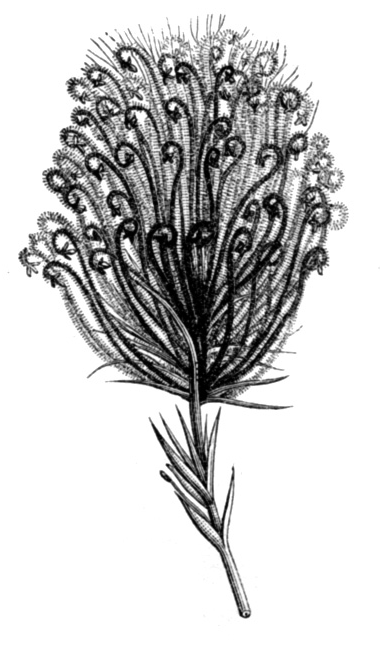
Inflorescence of Mecopus nidulans.

Mecopus is a genus of flowering plants in the legume family, Fabaceae. It includes a single species, Mecopus nidulans, a scrambling perennial or subshrub native to India, Indochina, the Andaman Islands, Hainan, Java, and the Lesser Sunda Islands. It belongs to the subfamily Faboideae.
