= Melliniella =

Scientific classification
- Kingdom: Plantae
- Clade: Tracheophytes
- Clade: Angiosperms
- Clade: Eudicots
- Clade: Rosids
- Order: Fabales
- Family: Fabaceae
- Subfamily: Faboideae
- Genus: Melliniella; Harms (1914)
- Species: M. micrantha

Binomial name
- Melliniella micrantha Harms (1914)

Genus of legumes

Melliniella is a monotypic genus of flowering plants in the legume family, Fabaceae. Its only species is Melliniella micrantha, an herbaceous annual native to western and west-central tropical Africa, ranging from Senegal to Chad and the Central African Republic. It belongs to subfamily Faboideae.
