= Monarthrocarpus =

Scientific classification
- Kingdom: Plantae
- Clade: Tracheophytes
- Clade: Angiosperms
- Clade: Eudicots
- Clade: Rosids
- Order: Fabales
- Family: Fabaceae
- Genus: Monarthrocarpus; Merr.

Genus of plants

Monarthrocarpus is a genus of flowering plants belonging to the family Fabaceae.

Its native range is Madagascar, Southeastern India, Central Malesia to New Guinea.

Species:

- Monarthrocarpus dolabriformis (Benth.) H.Ohashi & K.Ohashi
- Monarthrocarpus securiformis (Benth.) Merr.
