= Nephrodesmus =

Scientific classification
- Kingdom: Plantae
- Clade: Tracheophytes
- Clade: Angiosperms
- Clade: Eudicots
- Clade: Rosids
- Order: Fabales
- Family: Fabaceae
- Subfamily: Faboideae
- Tribe: Desmodieae
- Genus: Nephrodesmus; Schindl. (1916)

Species
- Nephrodesmus francii (Harms) Schindl.; Nephrodesmus hochreutineri Schindl.; Nephrodesmus parvifolius Schindl.; Nephrodesmus sericeus (Hochr.) Schindl.

Genus of legumes

Nephrodesmus is a genus of flowering plants in the legume family, Fabaceae. It belongs to the subfamily Faboideae. It contains four species, all endemic to New Caledonia. Its closest relatives is Arthroclianthus, also endemic to New Caledonia and their distinction has been challenged.
