= Leptodesmia =

Scientific classification
- Kingdom: Plantae
- Clade: Tracheophytes
- Clade: Angiosperms
- Clade: Eudicots
- Clade: Rosids
- Order: Fabales
- Family: Fabaceae
- Subfamily: Faboideae
- Genus: Leptodesmia (Benth.) Benth. & Hook. f. (1865)

Species
- Leptodesmia bojeriana (Baill.) Baker; Leptodesmia congesta (Wight) Benth.; Leptodesmia microphylla (Thunb.) H.Ohashi & K.Ohashi; Leptodesmia perrieri Schindl.

Genus of legumes

Leptodesmia is a genus of flowering plants in the legume family, Fabaceae. It belongs to the subfamily Faboideae. It includes four species ranging from Madagascar and the Comoros to the Indian subcontinent, Indochina, China, Japan, Malesia, New Guinea, and Queensland.

- Leptodesmia bojeriana (Baill.) Baker – Madagascar
- Leptodesmia congesta (Wight) Benth. – Comoros, Madagascar, and India
- Leptodesmia microphylla (Thunb.) H.Ohashi & K.Ohashi – Indian subcontinent to Indochina, China, Japan, Malesia, New Guinea, and Queensland
- Leptodesmia perrieri Schindl. – Comoros and Madagascar
