= Puhuaea =

Scientific classification
- Kingdom: Plantae
- Clade: Tracheophytes
- Clade: Angiosperms
- Clade: Eudicots
- Clade: Rosids
- Order: Fabales
- Family: Fabaceae
- Genus: Puhuaea; H.Ohashi & K.Ohashi (2019)

Species
- Puhuaea megaphylla (Zoll. & Moritzi) H.Ohashi & K.Ohashi; Puhuaea sequax (Wall.) H.Ohashi & K.Ohashi

Genus of plants

Puhuaea is a genus of flowering plants in the legume family, Fabaceae. It includes two species of shrubs native to tropical south and southeast Asia, southern China, Malesia, and New Guinea.
