= Hegnera =

Scientific classification
- Kingdom: Plantae
- Clade: Tracheophytes
- Clade: Angiosperms
- Clade: Eudicots
- Clade: Rosids
- Order: Fabales
- Family: Fabaceae
- Genus: Hegnera; Schindl. (1924)
- Species: H. obcordata

Binomial name
- Hegnera obcordata (Miq.) Schindl. (1924)

Synonyms
- Desmodium obcordatum (Miq.) Kurz (1873); Meibomia obcordata (Miq.) Kuntze (1891); Uraria obcordata Miq. (1861)

Genus of plants

Hegnera is a monotypic genus of flowering plants belonging to the family Fabaceae. The only species is Hegnera obcordata.

Its native range is Indo-China to western Malesia. It is found in the countries of Cambodia, Jawa, Laos, Malaya, Myanmar, Sumatera, Thailand and Vietnam.

The genus name of Hegnera is in honour of Johanna "Hansli" Cnefelius, née Hegner, a friend of the author of the genus, Anton Karl Schindler. The Latin specific epithet of obcordata refers to the obcordate shape of the leaves. Hegnera obcordata was first described and published in Repert. Spec. Nov. Regni Veg. Vol.20 on page 285 in 1924.

Hegnera obcordata has the following synonyms; Desmodium obcordatum (Miq.) Kurz, Meibomia obcordata (Miq.) Kuntze and Uraria obcordata Miq..
