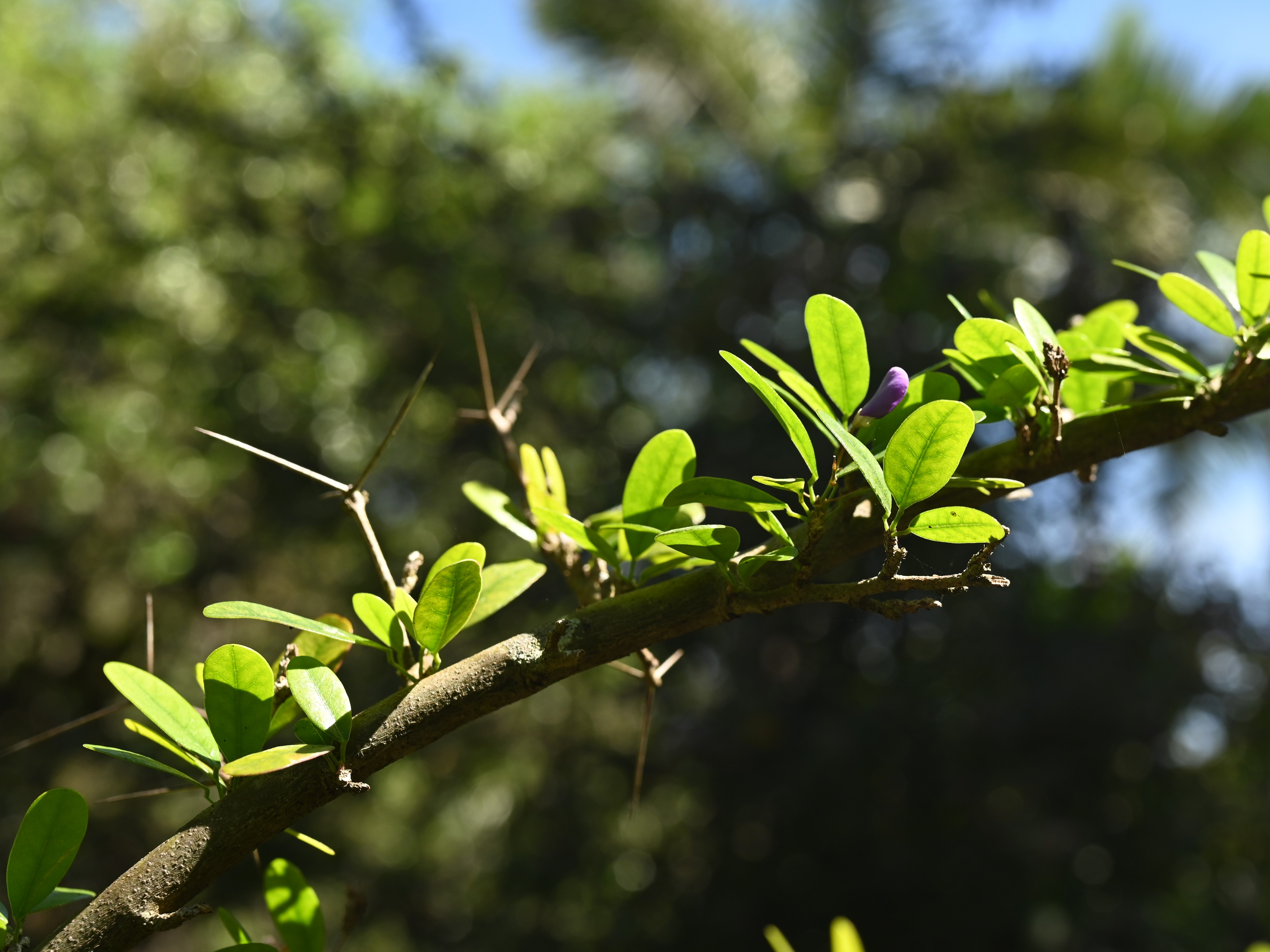
- Trifidacanthus unifoliolatus photographed in the Fairchild Tropical Botanic Garden, Miami

Scientific classification
- Kingdom: Plantae
- Clade: Tracheophytes
- Clade: Angiosperms
- Clade: Eudicots
- Clade: Rosids
- Order: Fabales
- Family: Fabaceae
- Subfamily: Faboideae
- Genus: Trifidacanthus; Merr. (1917)
- Species: T. unifoliolatus

Binomial name
- Trifidacanthus unifoliolatus Merr. (1917)

Synonyms
- Desmodium horridum Steenis (1978); Desmodium unifoliolatum (Merr.) Steenis (1982)

= Trifidacanthus =

Genus of legumes

Trifidacanthus unifoliolatus is a species of flowering plant in the legume family, Fabaceae. It is a shrub native to Vietnam, Hainan, the Philippines, and the Lesser Sunda Islands. It is the sole species in genus Trifidacanthus. It belongs to subfamily Faboideae.
