= Hanslia =

Scientific classification
- Kingdom: Plantae
- Clade: Embryophytes
- Clade: Tracheophytes
- Clade: Spermatophytes
- Clade: Angiosperms
- Clade: Eudicots
- Clade: Rosids
- Order: Fabales
- Family: Fabaceae
- Genus: Hanslia; Schindl. (1924)
- Species: H. ormocarpoides

Binomial name
- Hanslia ormocarpoides (DC.) H.Ohashi (2004)

Synonyms
- Desmodium dependens Blume (1855); Desmodium ormocarpoides DC. (1825); Desmodium pendulum F.Muell. (1874), nom. illeg.; Hanslia adhaerens Schindl. (1924); Hedysarum adhaerens Poir. (1817), nom. illeg.; Hedysarum ormocarpoides Desv. ex DC. (1825); Meibomia dependens (Blume ex Miq.) Kuntze (1891); Meibomia ormocarpoides (DC.) Kuntze (1891)

Genus of plants

Hanslia is a genus of flowering plants belonging to the family Fabaceae. It contains a single species, Hanslia ormocarpoides, a liana or shrub which ranges from Malesia to Vanuatu and Queensland, Australia.
