= Hiroyoshi Ohashi =

- Born: 1936 (age 89–90)
- Scientific career
- Author abbrev. (botany): H.Ohashi

Hiroyoshi Ohashi (大橋 広好, Ōhashi Hiroyoshi; born 1936) is a botanist formerly at the University of Tokyo and Tohoku University. He began publishing on Japanese Arisaema in the early 1960s. He published a couple of miscellaneous notes on Arisaema in 1963 and 1964 and these were followed by a revision of the genus for Japan jointly published in 1980 with J. Murata, and by the Araceae treatment for the Wildflowers of Japan (Ohashi, 1982).

He continued the work of the noted botanist Hara on the Flora of Eastern Himalaya. He has also compiled a list of types of Arisaema in Japanese herbaria and studied pollen morphology of Japanese Arisaema (Ohashi et al., 1983).

== Publications ==
- A proposal of Japanese names of cotyledon areoles and seed-coat inside areoles of legume seeds, Yasuhiko Endo, Hiroyoshi Ohashi, The Journal of Japanese Botany, 85, 2, 2010/04
- Diversification of seed arrangement induced by ovule rotation and septum formation in Leguminosae, Yasuhiko Endo and Hiroyoshi Ohashi, Journal of Plant Research, 122, 5, 541-550, 2009/09
- Phylogenetic Relationships of New World Vicia (Leguminosae) Inferred from nrDNA Internal Transcribed Spacer Sequences and Floral Characters, Yasuhiko Endo, Byoung-Hee Choi, Hiroyoshi Ohashi, Alfonso Delgado-Salinas, Systematic Botany, 33, 2, 356-363, 2008/05
- Phylogenetic significance of stylar features in genus Vicia (Leguminosae): an analysis with molecular phylogeny, Byoung-Hee Choi, Dong-Im Seok, Yasuhiko Endo, Hiroyoshi Ohashi, Journal of Plant Research, 119, 449-457, 2006/09
- A trifoliolate form of Vicia unijuga A. Br. (Leguminosae), Endo, Y. and Ohashi, H., The Journal of Japanese Botany, 80, 306-307, 2005/10
- A New species of Indigofera (Leguminosae) in Luzon Isl. of the Philippines, Yasuhiko Endo, Hiroyoshi Ohashi, and Domingo A. Madulid, The Journal of Japanese Botany, 80, 261-265, 2005/10
- Electrophoretic patterns of seed proteins in the East Asian Vicia species (Leguminosae) and their systematic utility, Elena Potokina, Yasuhiko Endo, Elly Eggi and Hiroyoshi Ohashi, The Journal of Japanese Botany, 78, 29-37, 2003/02
- Ohashi, H. 1963. Notes on Arisaema robustum (Engl.) Nakai, a species of the Araceae in Japan. Sci. Rep. Tohoku Univ., ser. 4, Biol. 29: 431-435.
- _________. 1964. A note on Arisaema monophyllum var. akitense. J. Jap. Bot. 39: 19-23.
- _________. 1981a. List of type specimens in the herbaria of Japan - Ariseama. Herbarium, Dept. of Botany, Fac. Sci, Kyoto, Univ., Japan.
- _________. 1981b. Catalogue of the type specimens preserved in the Herbarium of Department of Botany in the University Museum, University of Tokyo. Part 1. Araceae. University Museum, The University of Tokyo Material Report No. 5: 1-27, pl. 1-63.
- __________. 1982. Araceae. pp. 127–139. In: Satake et al. (eds.), Wild Flowers of Japan. Herbaceous Plants—Monocotyledoneae. Heibonsha, Tokyo.
- ___________ & J. Murata. 1980. Taxonomy of the Japanese Arisaema. J. Fac. Sci. Univ. Tokyo, sec. 3, Bot. 12: 281-336.
- ____________, J. Murata, & M. Takahashi. 1983. Pollen morphology of the Japanese Arisaema. Sci. Rep. Tôhoku Imp. Univ., Ser. 4, Biol. 38: 219-251.
