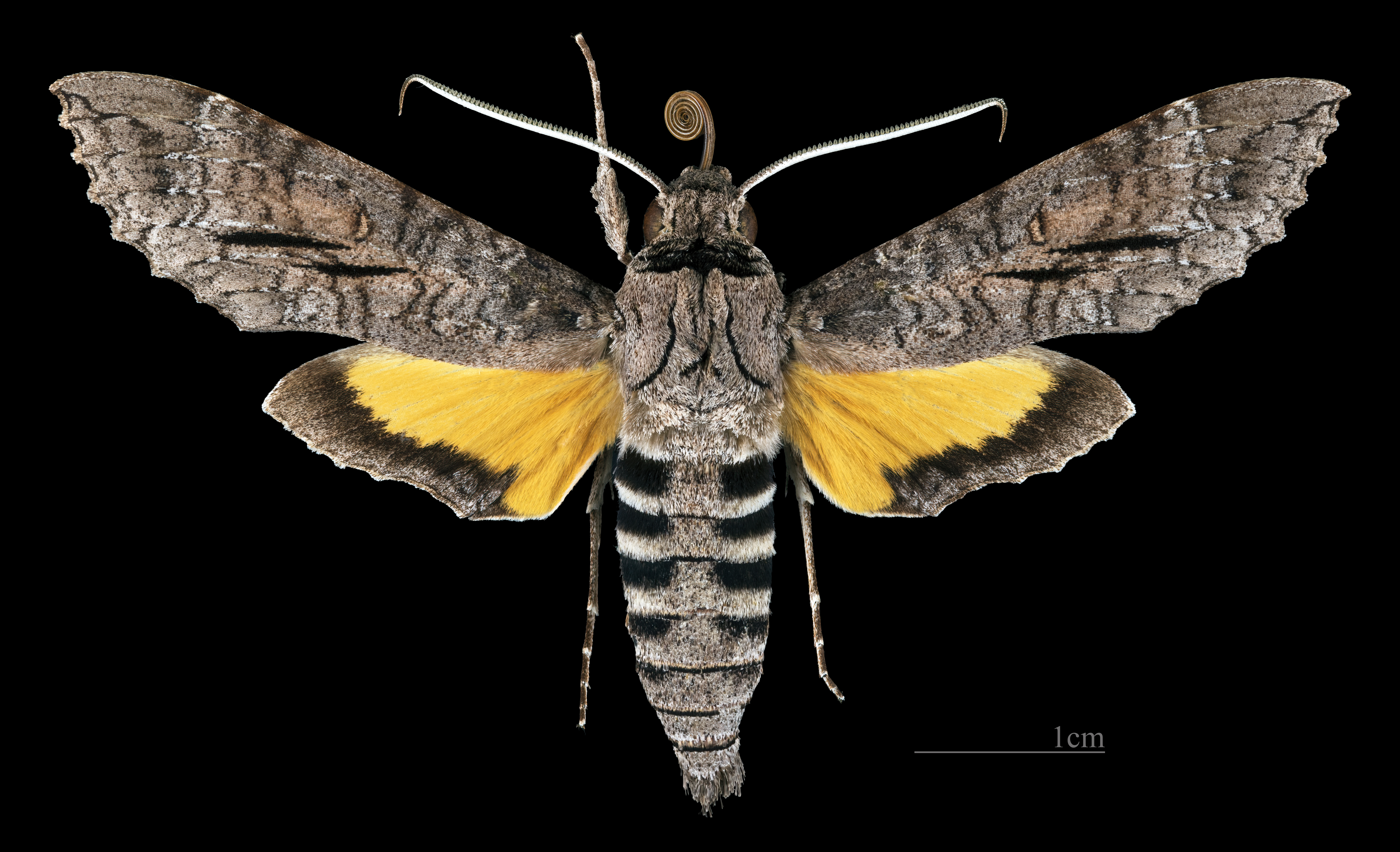
- Isognathus allamandae ♂
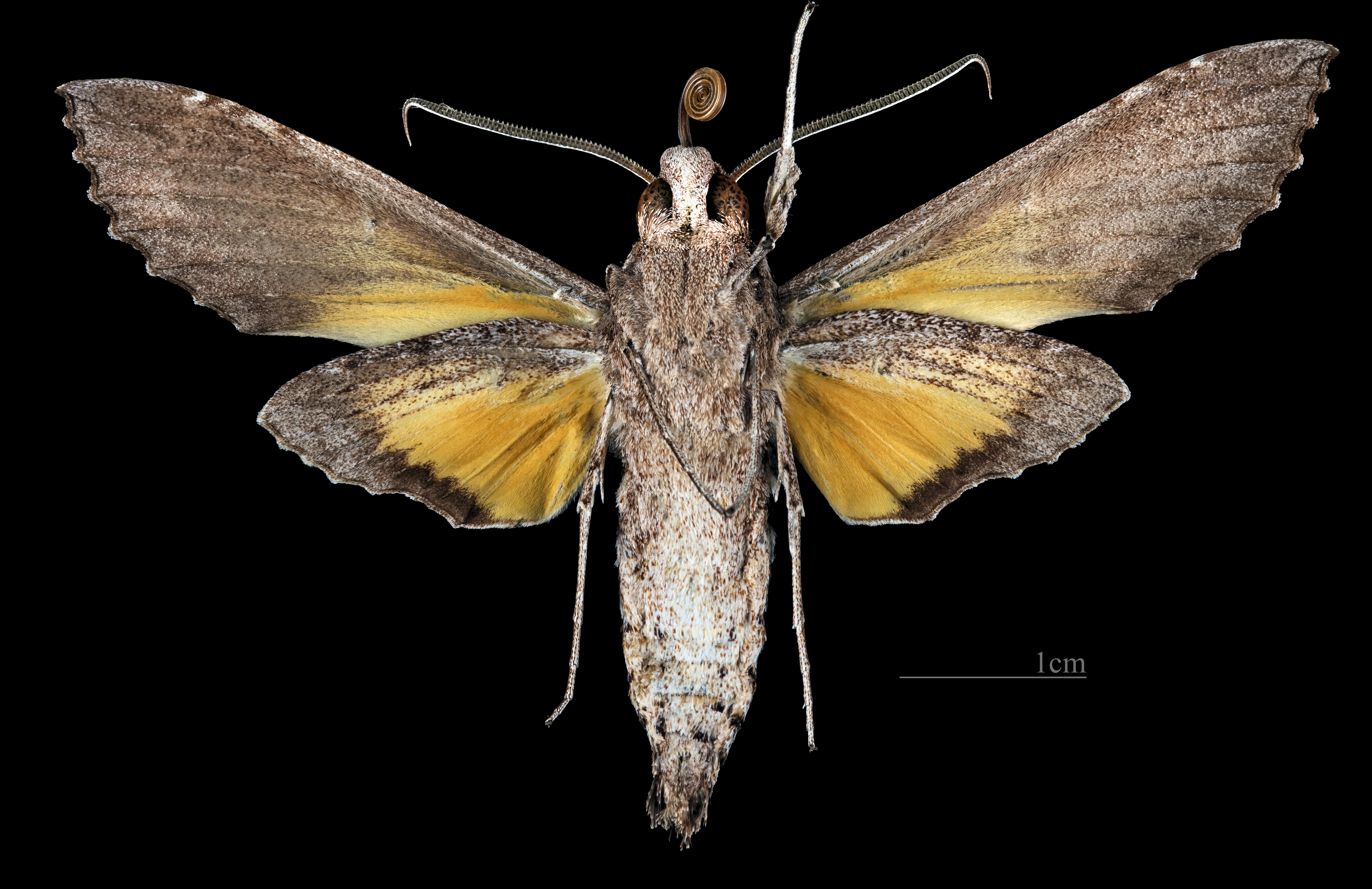
- Isognathus allamandae ♂ △

Scientific classification
- Domain: Eukaryota
- Kingdom: Animalia
- Phylum: Arthropoda
- Class: Insecta
- Order: Lepidoptera
- Family: Sphingidae
- Genus: Isognathus
- Species: I. allamandae

Binomial name
- Isognathus allamandae Clark, 1920

= Isognathus allamandae =

Species of moth

Isognathus allamandae is a moth of the family Sphingidae. It is found from Brazil to Venezuela.

The wingspan is 68 mm for males and 78 mm for females.

There are probably multiple generations per year. Adults have been recorded in June.

The larvae have been recorded feeding on Allamanda blanchetii and Allamanda cathartica.
