= Velva E. Rudd =

American botanist (1910–1999)

- Born: 1910; Fargo, North Dakota
- Died: December 9, 1999 (aged 88–89); California
- Education: North Dakota Agricultural College, George Washington University
- Scientific career
- Fields: Botany
- Workplaces: National Museum of Natural History, Smithsonian Institution and California State University, Northridge
- Thesis: The American Species of Aeschynomene (1953)

Velva Elaine Rudd (1910 – December 9, 1999) was an American botanist, specializing in tropical legumes. She worked as a curator at the Smithsonian Institution's National Museum of Natural History and also conducted research at the herbarium at California State University, Northridge.

== Early life ==
Velva Elaine Rudd was born in 1910 in Fargo, North Dakota.

== Education and career ==
Velva Rudd wrote her master's thesis at North Dakota Agricultural College on Euphorbia virgata (leafy spurge). The thesis is titled An ecological study of leafy spurge and was completed in 1932. In 1953 she received her Ph.D. in botany from George Washington University with a dissertation titled The American Species of Aeschynomene. She was an assistant curator from 1948 to 1959 and a curator from 1959 to 1973 in the Department of Botany, United States National Herbarium Smithsonian Institution of Washington, DC. She had started as a technician at the Smithsonian under Kittie Fenley Parker. Rudd specialized in Fabaceae and wrote more than 70 papers on the taxonomy of tropical species of legumes. Her contributions include a six-part monograph published from 1955 to 1968 in Contributions from the United States National Herbarium; the monograph deals with seven genera: Aeschynomene, Ateleia, Chaetocalyx, Cyathostegia, Dussia, Nissolia, and Ormosia. In 1973 she retired as a curator of the National Herbarium. She became a Research Fellow in the Department of Biology of the California State University, Northridge until her death. Her field work was carried out in many tropical locations, including Mexico, Costa Rica, Brazil, Venezuela, and Sri Lanka.

Rudd is the namesake for six species of legumes and the genus Ruddia. North Dakota State University's Department of Biological Sciences sponsors an annual Dr. Velva E. Rudd Scholarship Award for botany juniors or seniors.

== Eponyms ==
The Mexican genus of legumes Ruddia Yakovlev 1971 is named in her honor, as well as several species of legumes:

- (Fabaceae) Acacia ruddiae D.H.Janzen (from Costa Rica)
- (Fabaceae) Dioclea ruddiae R.H.Maxwell (from Venezuela)
- (Fabaceae) Nissolia ruddiae Cruz Durán & M.Sousa
- (Fabaceae) Ormosia ruddiana Yakovlev (from Minas Gerais, Brazil)
- (Melastomataceae) Clidemia ruddae Wurdack (from Mexico)
- (Mimosoideae) Vachellia ruddiae (D.H.Janzen) Seigler & Ebinger

== Taxa named by Rudd ==
- Paramachaerium krukovii Rudd (from western Brazil)
- Paramachaerium schunkei Rudd (from Peru)
- with Annetta Mary Carter: Acacia kelloggiana A.M.Carter & Rudd

=== with Mario Sousa ===
- Styphnolobium burseroides M.Sousa & Rudd
- Styphnolobium caudatum M.Sousa & Rudd (native to Nicaragua)
- Styphnolobium conzattii (Standl.) M.Sousa & Rudd
- Styphnolobium monteviridis M.Sousa & Rudd (native to Central America)
- Styphnolobium parviflorum M.Sousa & Rudd
- Styphnolobium protantherum M.Sousa & Rudd
- Styphnolobium sporadicum M.Sousa & Rudd
