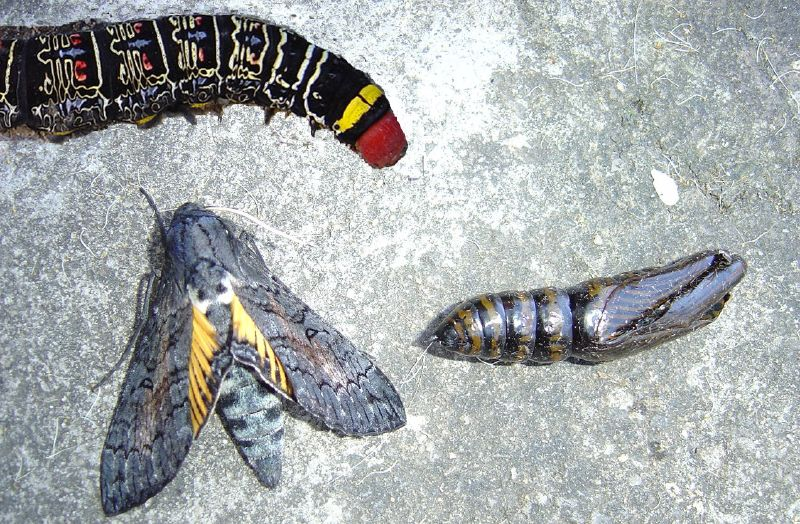

Scientific classification
- Kingdom: Animalia
- Phylum: Arthropoda
- Class: Insecta
- Order: Lepidoptera
- Family: Sphingidae
- Genus: Isognathus
- Species: I. caricae

Binomial name
- Isognathus caricae (Linnaeus, 1758)

Synonyms
- Sphinx caricae Linnaeus, 1758; Sphinx cacus Cramer, 1775

= Isognathus caricae =

Species of moth

Isognathus caricae is a moth of the family Sphingidae. It is known from Costa Rica, French Guiana, Bolivia, Argentina and Brazil.

== Description ==
It is similar to Acherontia species and other Isognathus species, from which it can be distinguished by the dark marginal band of the hindwing upperside, which is replaced by a series of black streaks along the veins.

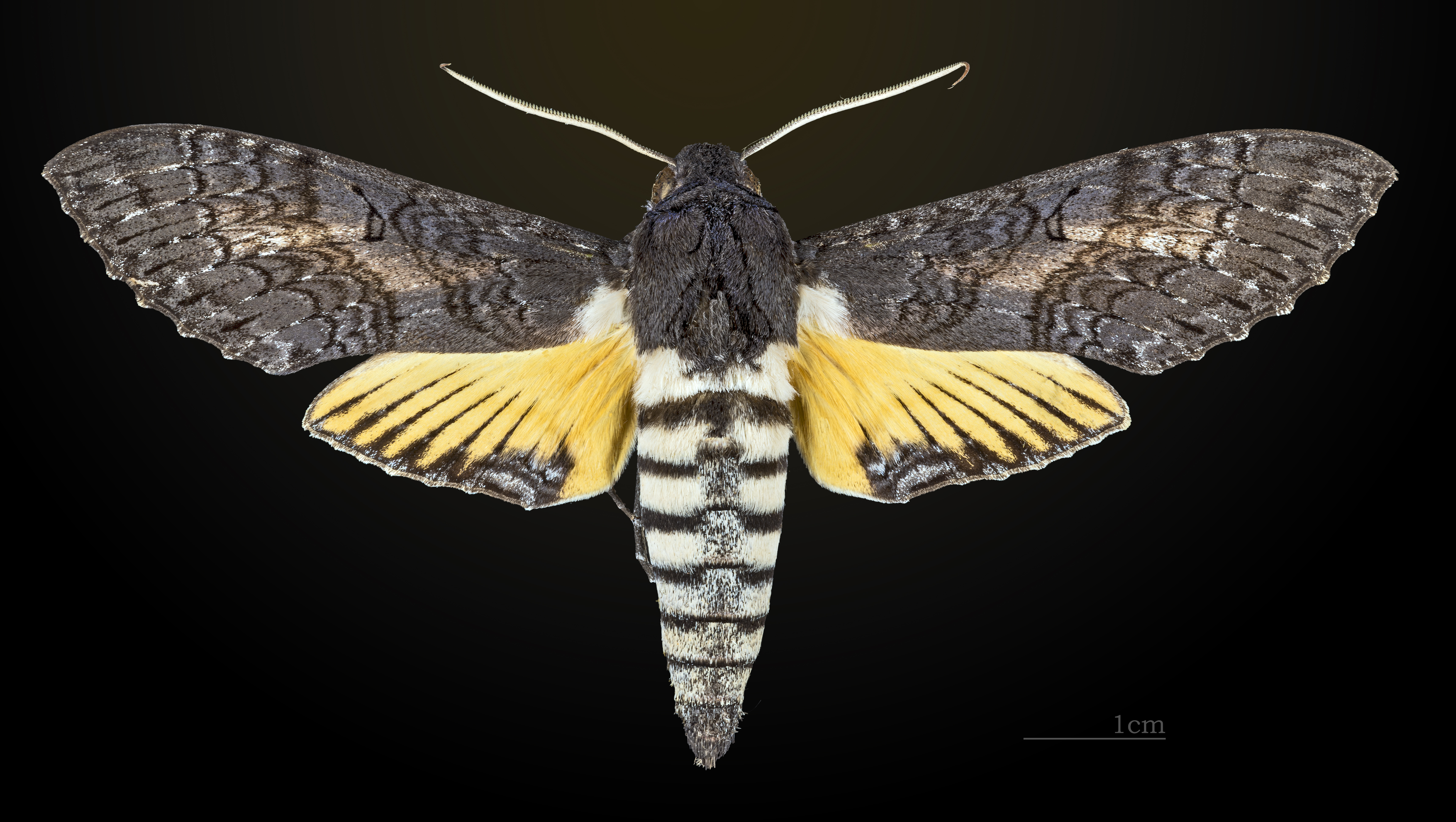
Dorsal

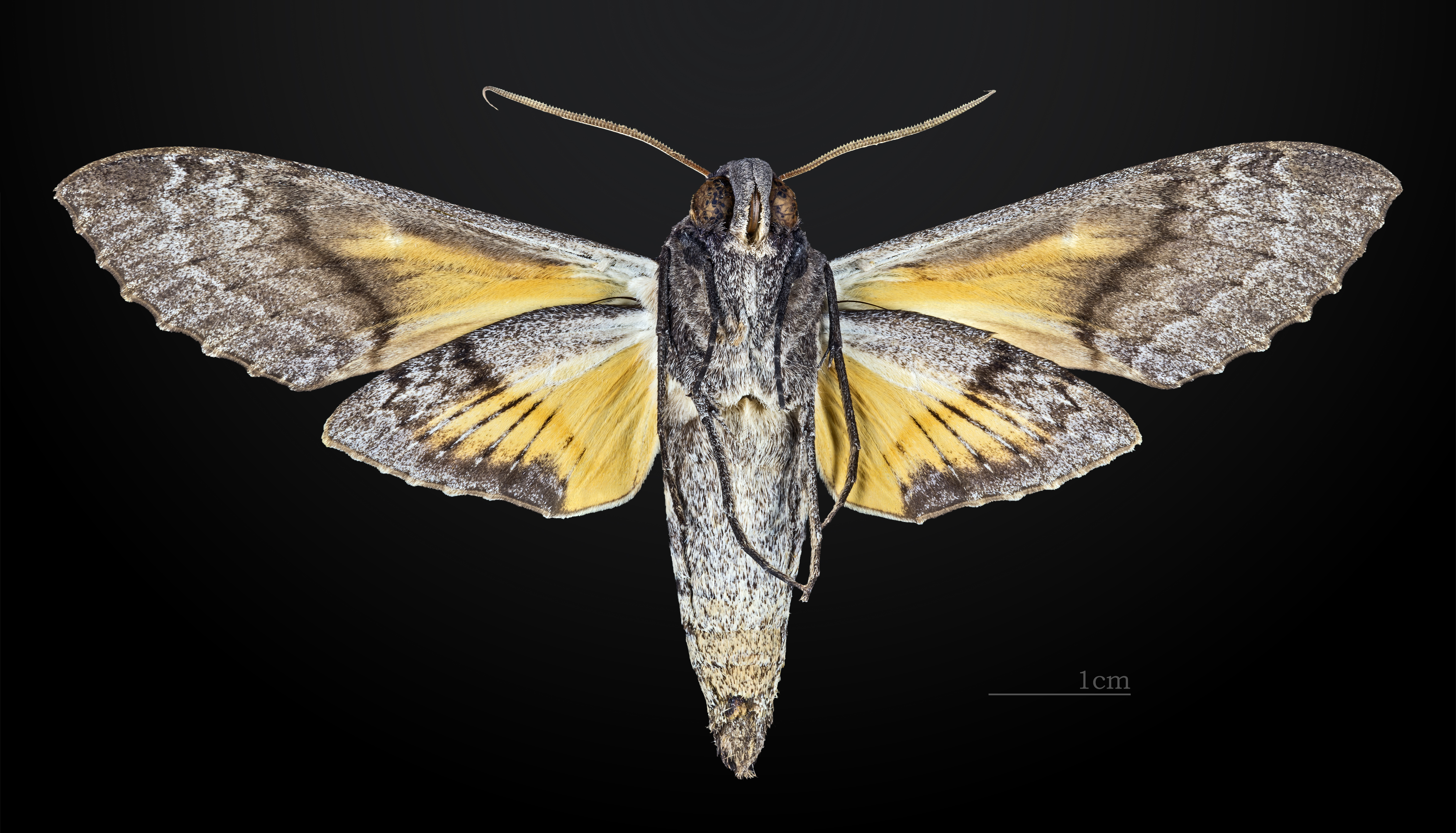
△ Ventral

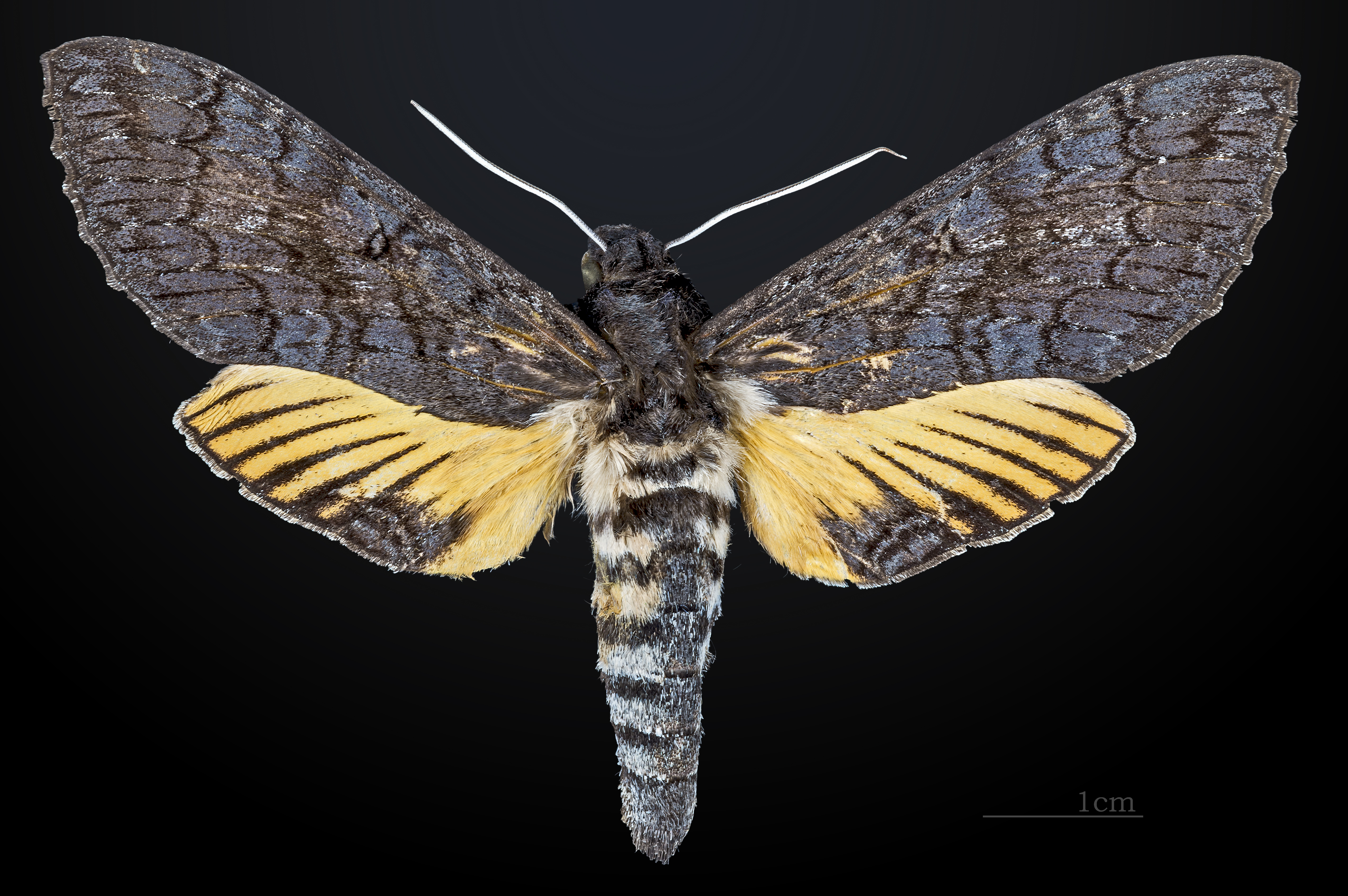
Dorsal

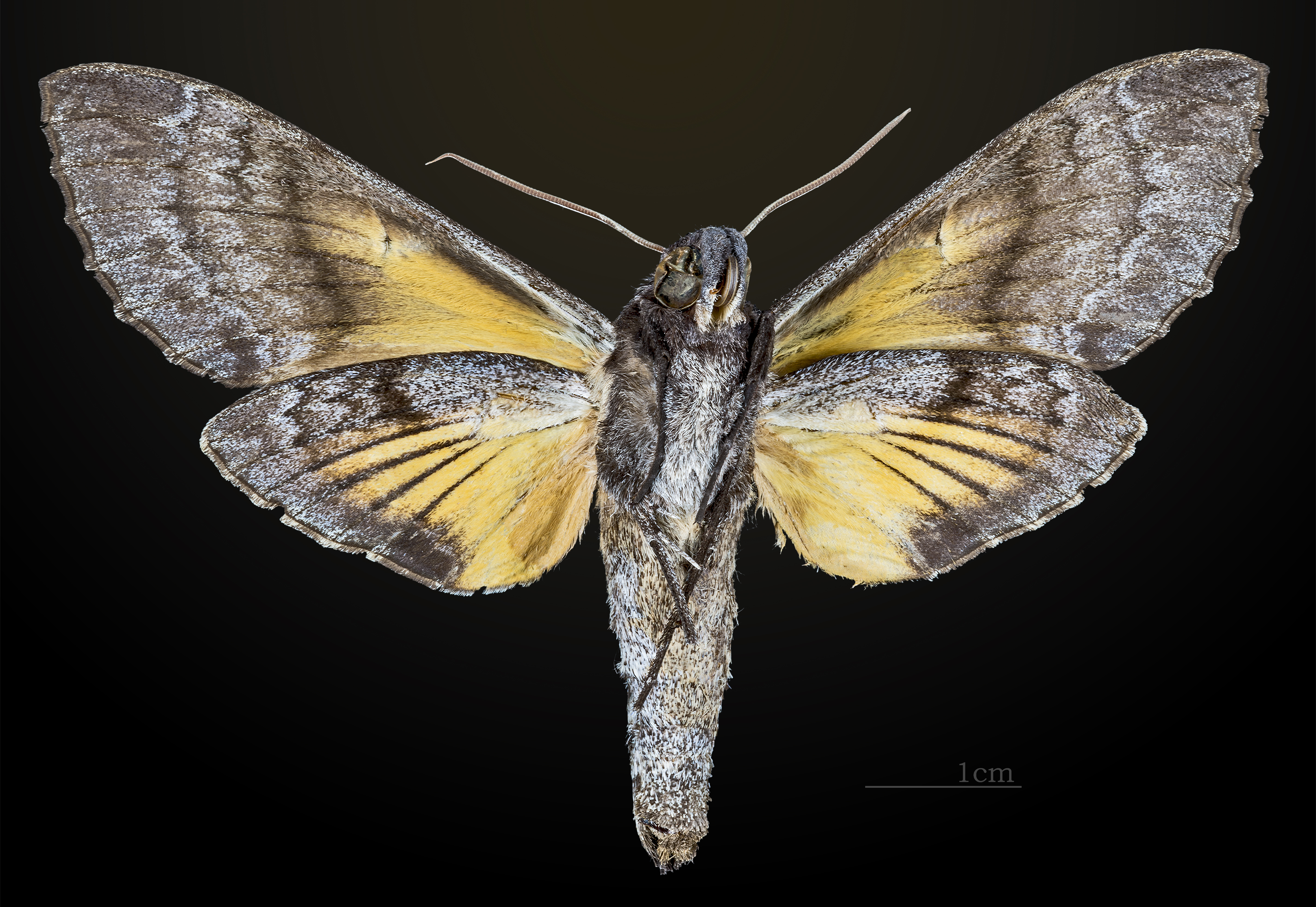
△ Ventral

== Biology ==
There are probably multiple generations per year.

The larvae have been recorded feeding on Himatanthus obovatus, Allamanda cathartica and Allamanda schottii. They have long tails and are very colourful, suggesting they are unpalatable to birds.

== Subspecies ==
- Isognathus caricae caricae (Costa Rica, French Guiana, Bolivia, Argentina and Brazil)
- Isognathus caricae rainermarxi Eitschberger, 1999 (Peru)

== Gallery ==
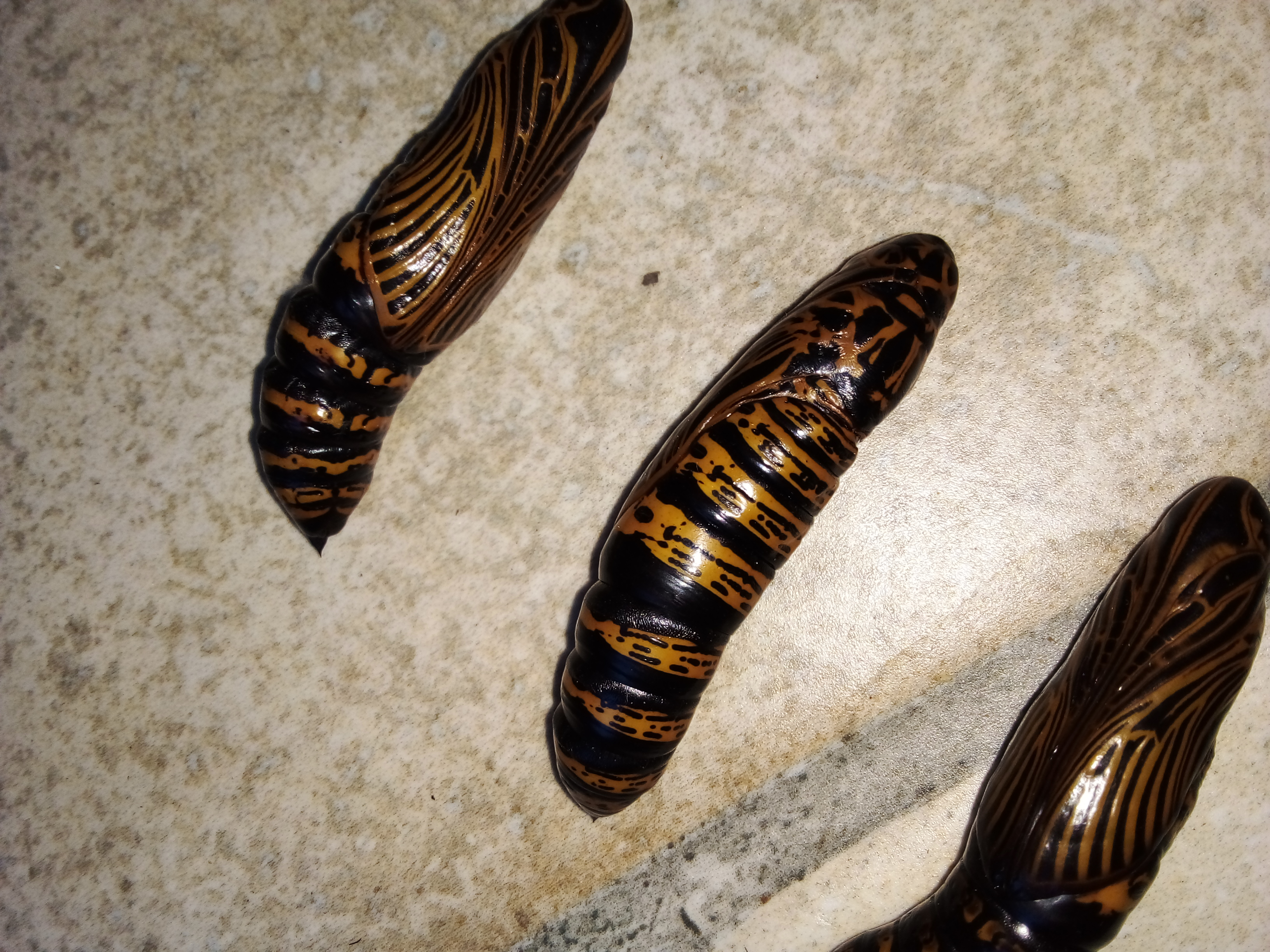

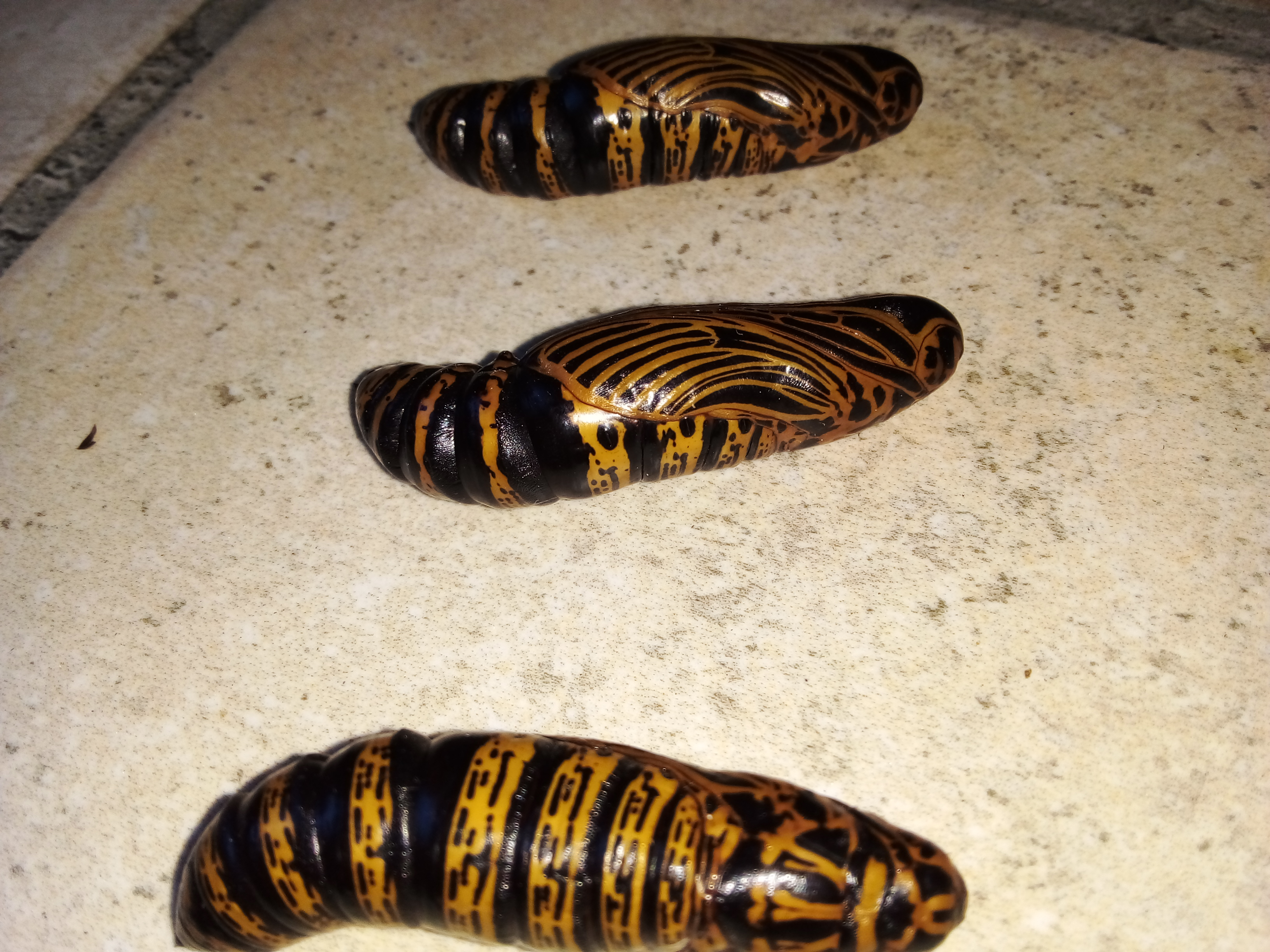

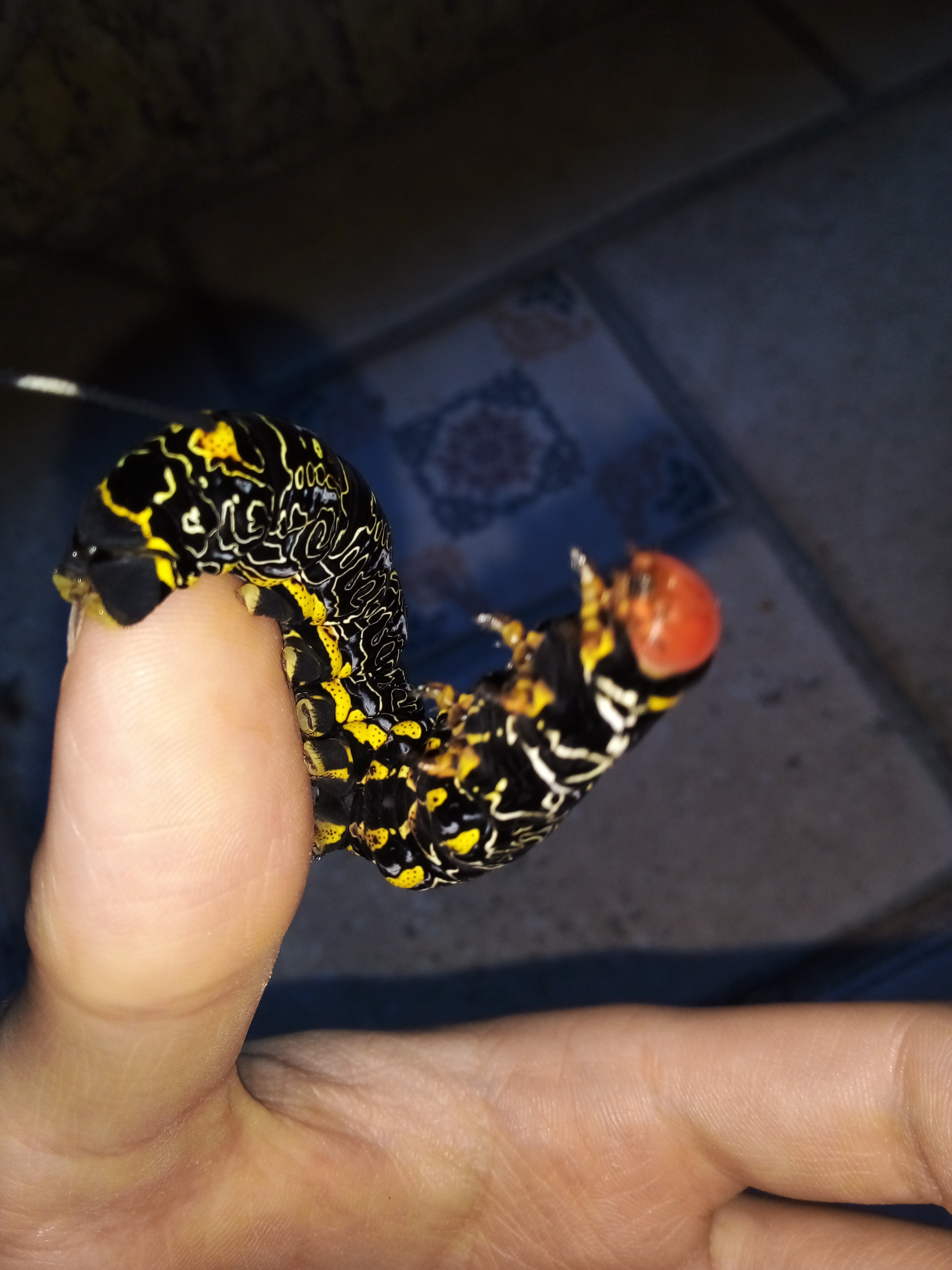

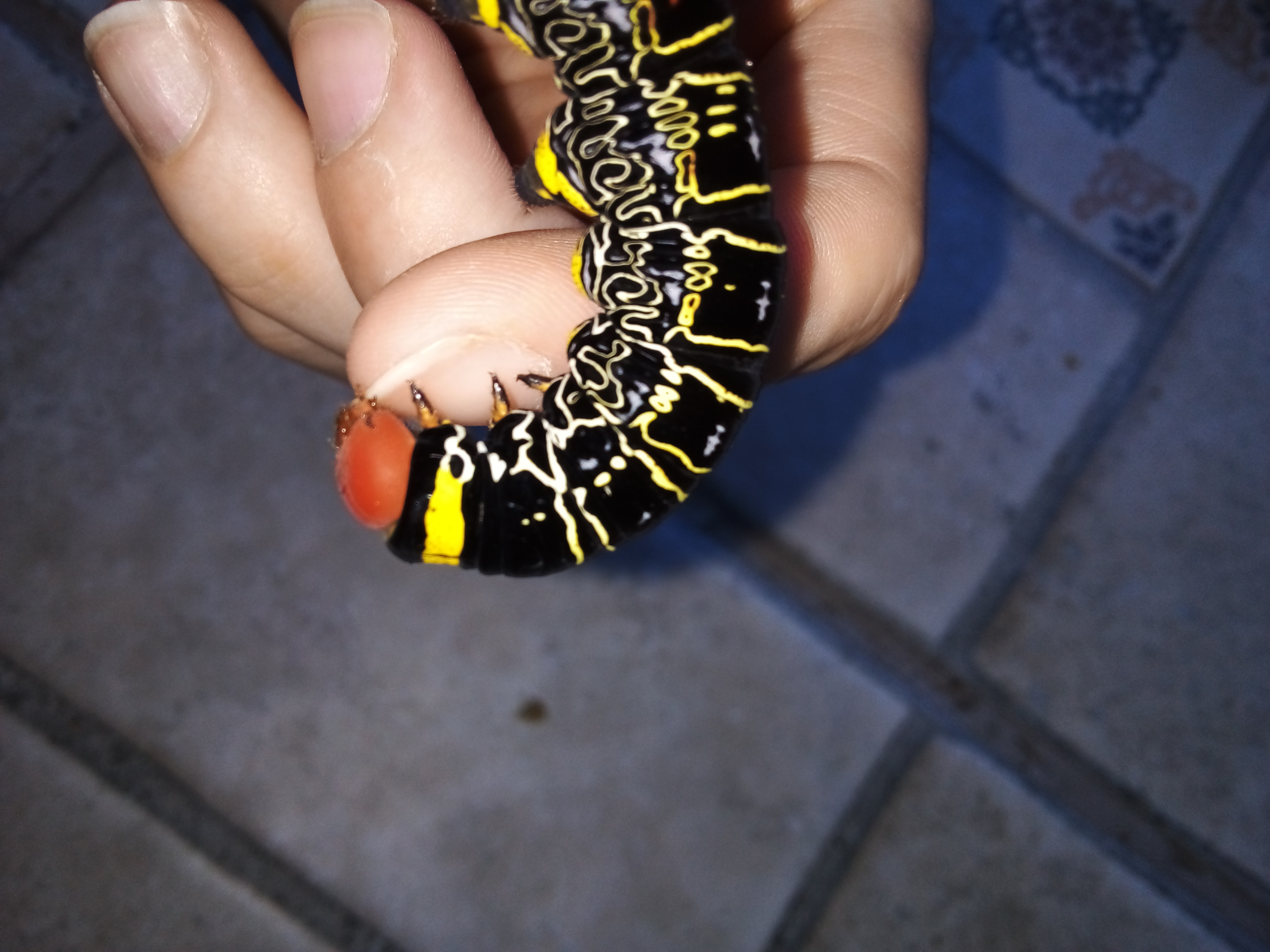
