= Trischidium =

Scientific classification
- Kingdom: Plantae
- Clade: Tracheophytes
- Clade: Angiosperms
- Clade: Eudicots
- Clade: Rosids
- Order: Fabales
- Family: Fabaceae
- Subfamily: Faboideae
- Tribe: Swartzieae
- Genus: Trischidium; Tul.

Type species
- Trischidium vestitum Tul. (1843)

Species
- Trischidium alternum (Benth.) H.E.Ireland; Trischidium decipiens (A.Lyons) H.E.Ireland; Trischidium limae (R.S.Cowan) H.E.Ireland; Trischidium molle (Benth.) H.E.Ireland; Trischidium racemulosum (Huber) H.E.Ireland

Synonyms
- Dithyria Benth. (1840), nom. provis.

Genus of legumes

Trischidium is a genus of flowering plants in the legume family, Fabaceae. It includes five species of trees and shrubs native to northern South America. All species are native to Brazil, with one species (Trischidium molle) extending to Bolivia, and another (T. alternum) to Bolivia, Colombia, Guyana, and Peru. Two species are native to tropical non-inundated Amazonian rain forest, one to coastal forest, and two to seasonally-dry cerrado (savanna and woodland) and caatinga (thorny bushland).

It belongs to the subfamily Faboideae. It was recently reinstated after existing for some time as a junior synonym of Bocoa. It is closely related to the genera Ateleia and Cyathostegia.
