= A. salicifolia =

A. salicifolia may refer to:

- Ajuga salicifolia, a plant species in the genus Ajuga
- Appendicula salicifolia J.J.Sm., Bot. Jahrb. Syst. 65: 482 (1933), an orchid species in the genus Appendicula
- Ateleia salicifolia, a legume species found only in Cuba
- Azara salicifolia, a plant species

== Synonyms ==
- Allamanda salicifolia, a synonym for Allamanda cathartica, a plant species

== See also ==
- Salicifolia (disambiguation)
