= Centrolobium ochroxylum =

Scientific classification
- Kingdom: Plantae
- Clade: Tracheophytes
- Clade: Angiosperms
- Clade: Eudicots
- Clade: Rosids
- Order: Fabales
- Family: Fabaceae
- Subfamily: Faboideae
- Genus: Centrolobium
- Species: C. ochroxylum

Binomial name
- Centrolobium ochroxylum Rudd

Species of legume

Centrolobium ochroxylum is a species of legume. It was first described by Velva Elaine Rudd. Centrolobium ochroxylum is part of the genus Centrolobium, and the family Fabaceae.

Centrolobium ochroxylum is an evergreen tree of medium to tall stature, capable of reaching up to 30 meters in height. It has a straight base and a globose crown. Its outer bark is light brown. Its branches have dense dark pubescence, pubescent petioles, and alternate, imparipinnately compound leaves. The petiolules are short, less than 3 to 5 mm, with 9 to 11 leaflets, each 9 to 19 cm long and 7 to 12 cm wide. The leaflets are opposite in a single plane, with the blade broadly elliptic to nearly round, an entire margin, an acuminate apex, and a rounded to obtuse base on the terminal leaflet.

== Origin ==
This species can be found in Peru and Ecuador. It is also found in the Darién Province, in the south of the Republic of Panama in Central America, where some residents call it Amarillo Guayaquil.

== Uses ==
Its wood is highly sought after in the local market for carpentry. It is also used locally for rural constructions, firewood, and its fruit serves as food for birds and squirrels.
