= Guayacán (disambiguation) =

Guayacán is the Spanish word for plant species in the genus Guaiacum.

Guayacán may also refer to:

== Other plants ==
- Albizia pistaciifolia, Guayacán Cenega, Guayacán Chaparro or Guayacán Hobo (Colombia)
- Centrolobium yavizanum (Colombia)
- Minquartia guianensis (Ecuador)
- Porlieria chilensis (Chile)
- Tabebuia chrysantha (Ecuador, Venezuela)

== Places ==
- Guayacán, Ceiba, Puerto Rico
- Guayacán, Coquimbo, Chile, a neighborhood in Coquimbo, Chile

== Books ==
- Guayacán, a novel by Guatemalan writer Virgilio Rodríguez Macal
