= Candolleodendron =

Scientific classification
- Kingdom: Plantae
- Clade: Tracheophytes
- Clade: Angiosperms
- Clade: Eudicots
- Clade: Rosids
- Order: Fabales
- Family: Fabaceae
- Subfamily: Faboideae
- Tribe: Swartzieae
- Genus: Candolleodendron; R.S.Cowan (1966)
- Species: C. brachystachyum

Binomial name
- Candolleodendron brachystachyum (DC.) R.S.Cowan (1966)

Synonyms
- Swartzia brachystachya DC. (1826); Tounatea brachystachya (DC.) Kuntze (1891)

Genus of legumes

Candolleodendron brachystachyum is a species of flowering plant in the legume family, Fabaceae. It belongs to the subfamily Faboideae. It is the only member of the genus Candolleodendron. It is a tree native to the Amazon rain forest of northern Brazil (Pará), Suriname, and French Guiana.
