= Ateleia popenoei =

Conservation status
- Critically Endangered (IUCN 3.1)

Scientific classification
- Kingdom: Plantae
- Clade: Embryophytes
- Clade: Tracheophytes
- Clade: Spermatophytes
- Clade: Angiosperms
- Clade: Eudicots
- Clade: Rosids
- Order: Fabales
- Family: Fabaceae
- Subfamily: Faboideae
- Genus: Ateleia
- Species: A. popenoei

Binomial name
- Ateleia popenoei Correll

Species of legume

Ateleia popenoei is a species of flowering plant in the family Fabaceae. It is found only in Bahamas.
