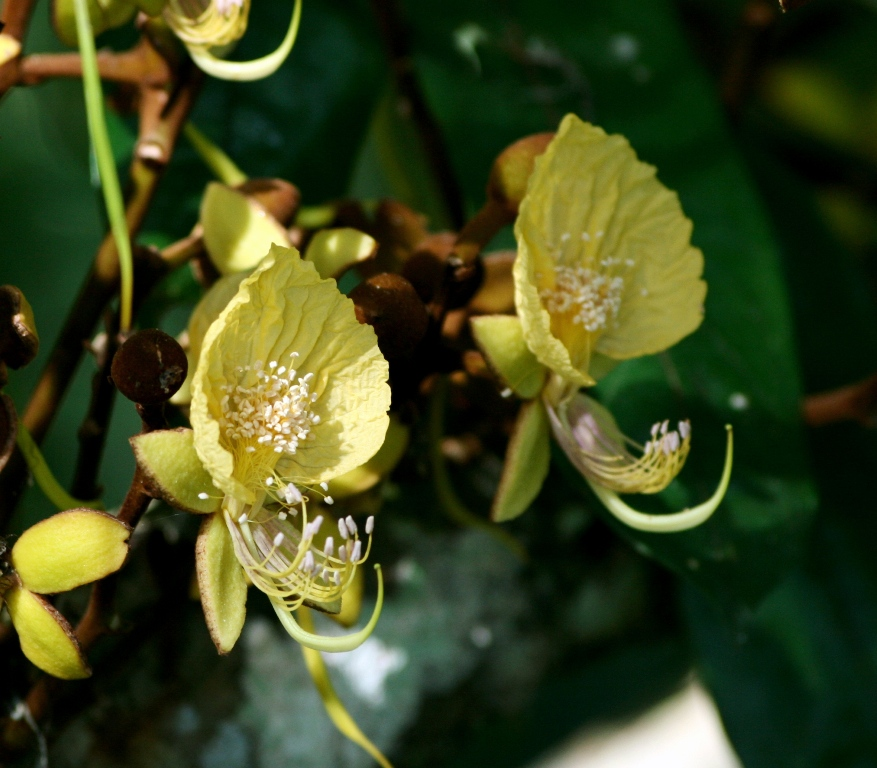
- Swartzia picta

Scientific classification
- Kingdom: Plantae
- Clade: Tracheophytes
- Clade: Angiosperms
- Clade: Eudicots
- Clade: Rosids
- Order: Fabales
- Family: Fabaceae
- Subfamily: Faboideae
- Tribe: Swartzieae; DC.

Type genus
- Swartzia Schreb.

Subclades and Genera
- See text.
- Distribution of the Swartzieae

Synonyms
- Swartziaceae Bartling; Swartzieae clade; Swartzieae sensu stricto; Swartzioid clade Torke and Schaal 2008; Swartzioids sensu lato; Tounateeae Baill. 1870

= Swartzieae =

Clade of legumes

The tribe Swartzieae is an early-branching monophyletic clade of the flowering plant subfamily Faboideae or Papilionaceae. Traditionally this tribe has been used as a wastebasket taxon to accommodate genera of Faboideae which exhibit actinomorphic, rather than zygomorphic floral symmetry and/or incompletely differentiated petals and free stamens. It was recently revised and most of its genera were redistributed to other tribes (Amburaneae, Baphieae, and Exostyleae). Under its new circumscription, this clade is consistently resolved in molecular phylogenies. Members of this tribe possess "non-papilionate swartzioid flowers[…]largely characterized by a tendency to lack petals combined with a profusion and elaboration of free stamens" and a "lack of unidirectional order in the initiation of the stamens". They also have "complete or near complete fusion of sepals resulting from intercalary growth early in development, relatively numerous stamens, and a single or no petal, with other petals not at all apparent in development." The tribe is predicted to have diverged from the other legume lineages 48.9±2.8 million years ago (in the Eocene).

== Subclades and genera ==
=== Swartzioids sensu stricto Ireland et al. 2000 ===
The members of this clade occur mainly in lowland rain forests.

- Bobgunnia J. H. Kirkbr. & Wiersema
- Bocoa Aubl.
- Candolleodendron R. S. Cowan
- Fairchildia Britton & Rose
- Swartzia Schreb.

=== Atelioids Ireland et al. 2000 ===
The members of this clade are distinguished by "a nearly actinomorphic androecium with basifixed anthers, exarillate seeds, and a tendency toward alternate leaflets." They occur mainly in neotropical, seasonally-dry tropical woodlands.

- Ateleia (DC.) Benth.
- Cyathostegia (Benth.) Schery
- Trischidium Tul.
