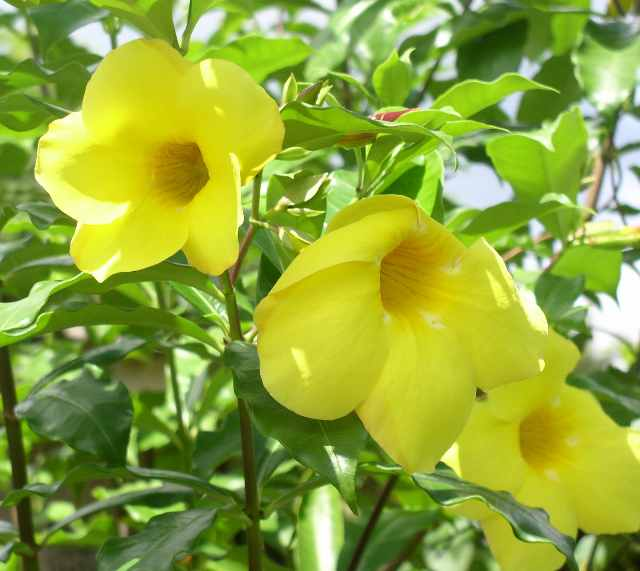
- Allamanda cathartica

Scientific classification
- Kingdom: Plantae
- Clade: Tracheophytes
- Clade: Angiosperms
- Clade: Eudicots
- Clade: Asterids
- Order: Gentianales
- Family: Apocynaceae
- Subfamily: Rauvolfioideae
- Tribe: Plumerieae
- Subtribe: Allamandinae; A.DC. in DC. & A.DC.
- Genus: Allamanda; L.

Species
- See text

Synonyms
- Orelia Aubl.

= Allamanda =

Genus

Allamanda is a genus of flowering plants in the family Apocynaceae. They are native to the Americas, where they are distributed from Mexico to Argentina. Some species are familiar as ornamental plants cultivated for their large, colorful flowers. Most species produce yellow flowers; A. blanchetii bears pink flowers. The genus name Allamanda honors the Swiss botanist and physician Frédéric-Louis Allamand (1736–1809). It is the official flower of Kuching North City Hall.

== Description ==
Plants of the genus are evergreen trees, shrubs, or vines. They contain a white latex. The leaves are opposite or arranged in whorls of up to 5. The blades are generally oval and smooth-edged, and some are leathery or lightly hairy. The inflorescence is a compound cyme. The flower has five lobed sepals and a bell- or funnel-shaped corolla of five petals, yellow in most species. The fruit is a schizocarp containing two to four seeds.

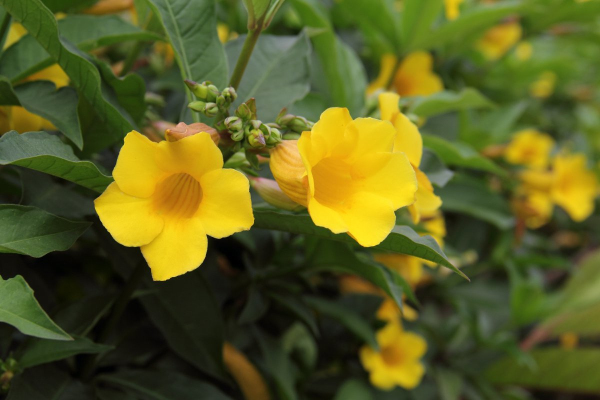
Flowers of Allamanda schottii

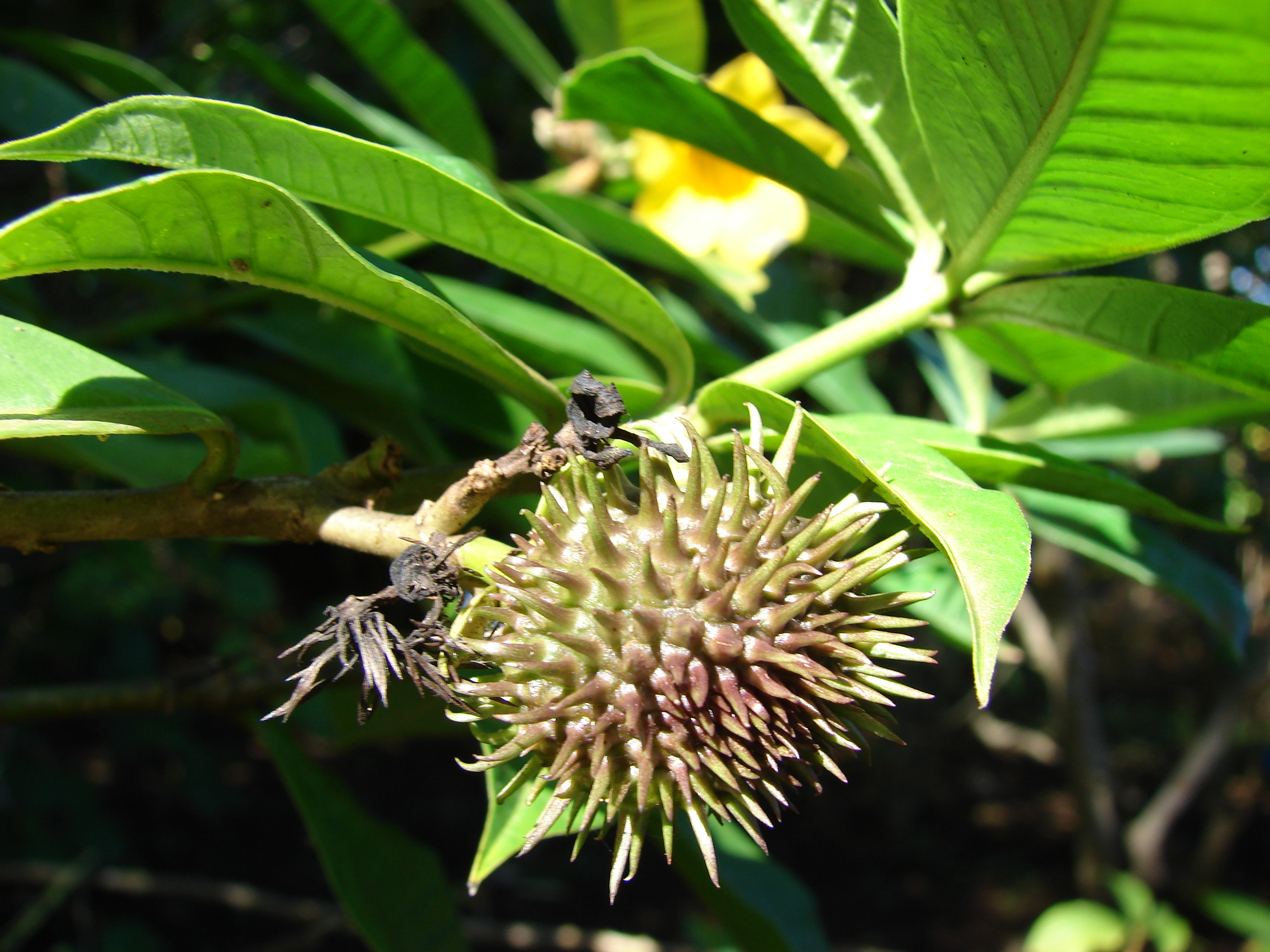
Allamanda schottii fruit

== Chemistry and medicine ==
In lab analyses Allamanda species have yielded several chemical compounds, including iridoid lactones such as allamandin, plumericin, and plumierides. Plumericin particularly was demonstrated to be a highly potent NF-κB inhibitor with anti-inflammatory activity in vitro and in vivo, while its structurally related derivatives plumierdin, plumeridoid C, and allamandicin did not have activity. The lignan pinoresinol and coumarins such as scopoletin and scoparone have been isolated from A. schottii.

Allamanda species have been used in systems of traditional medicine for various purposes. A. cathartica has been used to treat liver tumors, jaundice, splenomegaly, and malaria. In analyses, some species have shown some activity against carcinoma cells, pathogenic fungi, and HIV.

In June 2022 a research team in the Gunung Leuser National Park, Sumatra, Indonesia, observed an orangutan chewing the stem and leaves of this plant, locally known as akar kuning, and applying the resulting paste and chewed leaves to a serious wound on its face. This is considered the first time a non-human species was seen deliberately preparing and applying medicine. After five days, the wound had closed, and fully healed three weeks later. Note: this is mistaken. The plant used by the orangutan was Fibraurea tinctoria, see Fibraurea tinctoria. The source of confusion is that both species have the same common name, Akar Kuning.

== Cultivation ==
In the wild, allamandas grow along riverbanks and other open, sunny areas with adequate rainfall and perpetually moist substrate. The plants do not tolerate shade or salty or alkaline soils, and they are sensitive to frost. They grow rapidly, sometimes spreading 3 meters per year. They can be propagated from cuttings.

Can be trained as a standard.

== Ecology ==
Allamandas have become naturalized throughout the tropics, growing in roadside ditches, abandoned yards, and dumps. A. cathartica in particular is an invasive species in Queensland. Cutting is ineffective as a means of control, because the plants respond to coppicing.

== Taxonomy ==
There are about 12 to 15 valid species in the genus.

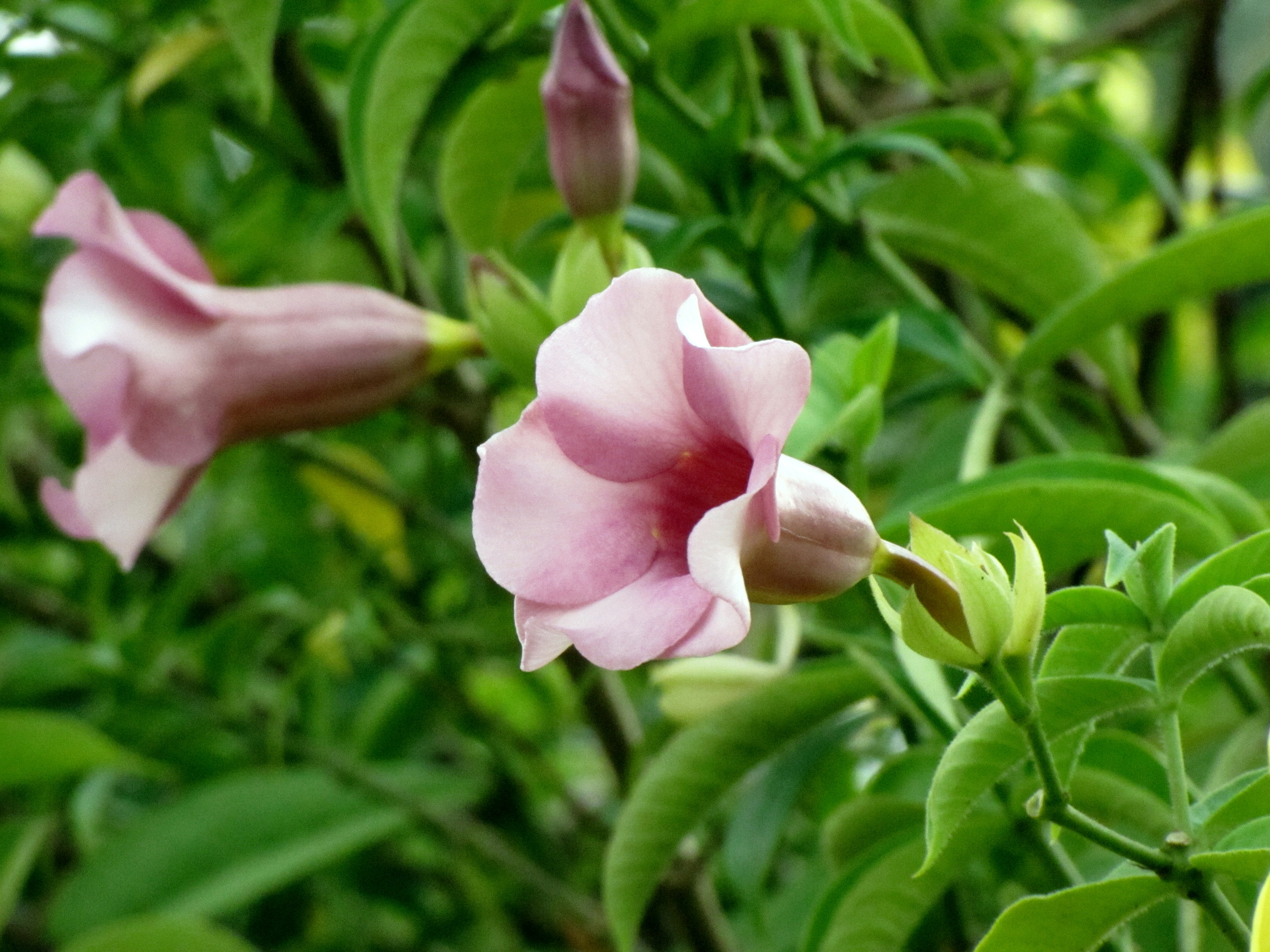
Allamanda blanchetii

Species and synonyms include:

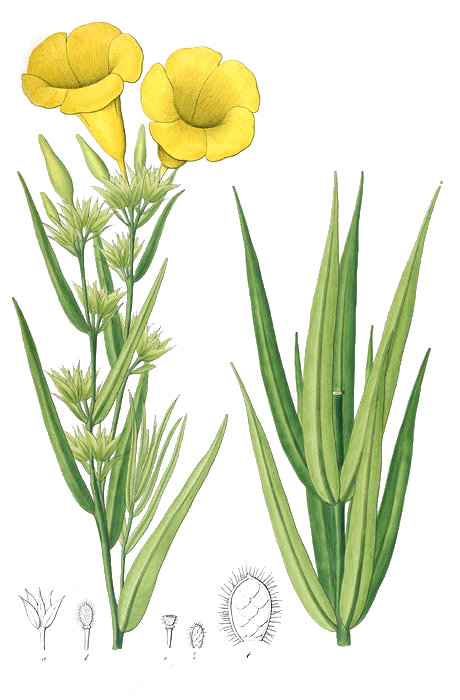
Allamanda angustifolia by Johann Pohl

- Allamanda angustifolia Pohl
- Allamanda blanchetii A.DC. – purple allamanda, violet allamanda, violet trumpetvine
- Allamanda calcicola
- Allamanda cathartica L. – yellow allamanda, golden-trumpet, common trumpetvine brownbud allamanda
- Allamanda doniana Müll.Arg.
- Allamanda laevis Markgr.
- Allamanda martii Müll.Arg.
- Allamanda nobilis T.Moore
- Allamanda oenotherifolia Pohl
- Allamanda polyantha Müll.Arg.
- Allamanda puberula A.DC.
- Allamanda schottii Pohl – bush allamanda
- Allamanda setulosa Miq.
- Allamanda thevetifolia Müll.Arg.
- Allamanda weberbaueri Markgr.
