= Frédéric-Louis Allamand =

Swiss botanist

- Born: 10 February 1736; Payerne, Vaud, Switzerland
- Died: 3 March 1809 (aged 73); Valkenburg, South Holland
- Known for: Describing several plant genera
- Spouse: Adriana van Guericke
- Relatives: Jean-Nicolas-Sébastien Allamand (uncle)
- Awards: The genus Allamanda is named in his honor
- Scientific career
- Fields: Botany
- Institutions: Leiden, St. Petersburg
- Author abbrev. (botany): F.Allam.

Frédéric-Louis Allamand (February 5, 1736, Payerne, Vaud – March 3, 1809, Valkenburg, South Holland) was a Swiss botanist. Born in Payerne, Switzerland, he moved to Leiden, Netherlands in 1749 to live with his uncle, Jean-Nicolas-Sébastien Allamand (1713–1787), a professor in philosophy and mathematics at Leiden University, well known naturalist, member of the Royal Society and correspondent of Benjamin Franklin. Frédéric started to study literature at the university of Leiden, however later changed to study medicine. In 1760 he joined the Dutch marine as a ship's doctor. During his time at the marine he visited among other places Suriname and Guyana. In 1769, he married Adriana van Guericke in Brielle. Afterwards he became doctor at Catherine the Great's court in St. Petersburg. In 1793 he returned to Leiden to work at the university.

He was a correspondent of Carl Linnaeus, and described several plant genera himself. The genus Allamanda is named in his honor.
