= Allamanda polyantha =

Scientific classification
- Kingdom: Plantae
- Clade: Tracheophytes
- Clade: Angiosperms
- Clade: Eudicots
- Clade: Asterids
- Order: Gentianales
- Family: Apocynaceae
- Genus: Allamanda
- Species: A. polyantha

Binomial name
- Allamanda polyantha Müll.Arg.

Species of plant

Allamanda polyantha is an ornamental plant in the genus Allamanda of the family Apocynaceae, which is native to Brazil.
