= Fairchildia =

Scientific classification
- Kingdom: Plantae
- Clade: Tracheophytes
- Clade: Angiosperms
- Clade: Eudicots
- Clade: Rosids
- Order: Fabales
- Family: Fabaceae
- Subfamily: Faboideae
- Tribe: Swartzieae
- Genus: Fairchildia; Britton & Rose (1930)
- Species: F. panamensis

Binomial name
- Fairchildia panamensis (Benth.) Britton & Rose (1930)

Synonyms
- Swartzia panamensis Benth.; Swartzia pinnata Seem.; Tounatea panamensis (Benth.) Taub.; Tunatea panamensis (Benth.) Kuntze

Genus of legumes

Fairchildia panamensis is a species of flowering plants in the family Fabaceae. It belongs to the subfamily Faboideae. It is the only member of the genus Fairchildia. It ranges Honduras through southern Central America to Colombia.
