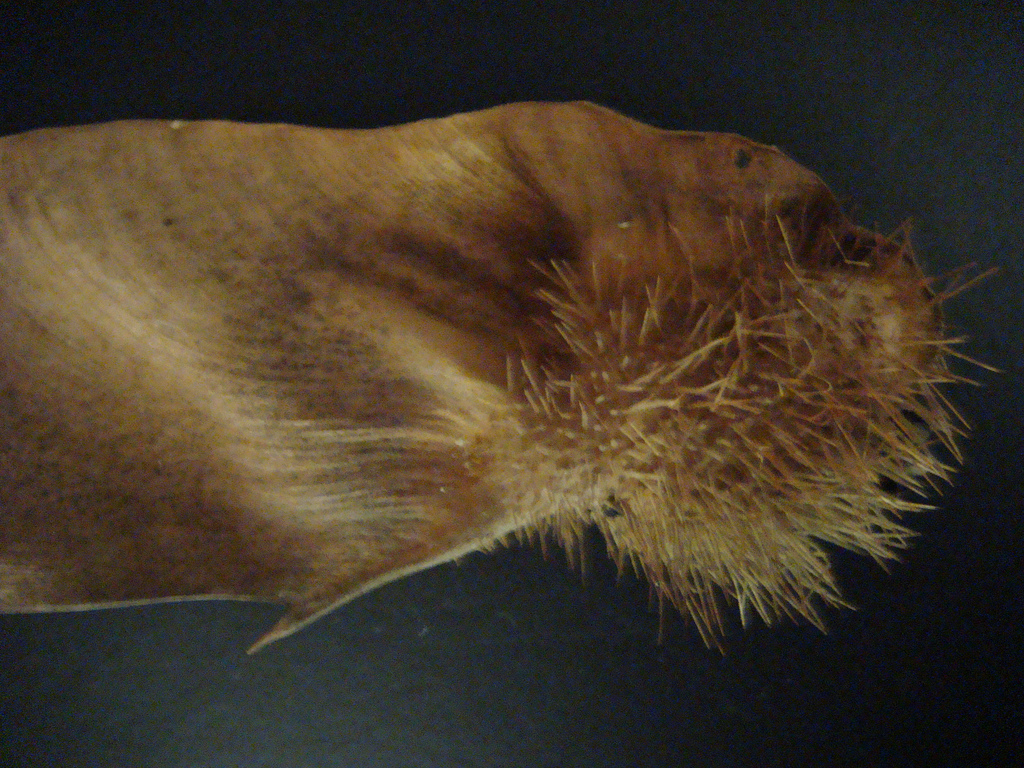
- Centrolobium fruit

Scientific classification
- Kingdom: Plantae
- Clade: Tracheophytes
- Clade: Angiosperms
- Clade: Eudicots
- Clade: Rosids
- Order: Fabales
- Family: Fabaceae
- Subfamily: Faboideae
- Tribe: Dalbergieae
- Genus: Centrolobium; Mart. ex Benth.

Species
- 7; see text.

= Centrolobium =

Genus of legumes

Centrolobium is a Neotropical genus of flowering plants in the family Fabaceae, assigned to the informal monophyletic Pterocarpus clade of the Dalbergieae. The genus comprises mostly large trees to 30 m tall, characterised by an abundance of orange peltate glands that cover most parts of the plant, and fruits that are large winged samaras to 30 cm long with a spiny basal seed chamber.

== Species ==
Centrolobium comprises the following species:

- Centrolobium microchaete (Mart. ex Benth.) H.C. Lima—canarywood, tarara amarilla
- Centrolobium ochroxylum Rudd
- Centrolobium paraense Tul.
- Centrolobium robustum (Vell.) Mart. ex Benth.
- Centrolobium sclerophyllum H.C. Lima
- Centrolobium tomentosum Guill. ex Benth.
- Centrolobium yavizanum Pittier—amarillo de Guayaquil
