= Allamanda puberula =

Scientific classification
- Kingdom: Plantae
- Clade: Tracheophytes
- Clade: Angiosperms
- Clade: Eudicots
- Clade: Asterids
- Order: Gentianales
- Family: Apocynaceae
- Genus: Allamanda
- Species: A. puberula

Binomial name
- Allamanda puberula A.DC.

Species of plant

Allamanda puberula (syn. Allamanda puberula var. glabrata Müll.Arg.) is a species of plant in the family Apocynaceae, which is native to Brazil, typically in Caatinga, and Cerrado vegetation. This plant is cited in Flora Brasiliensis by Carl Friedrich Philipp von Martius.
