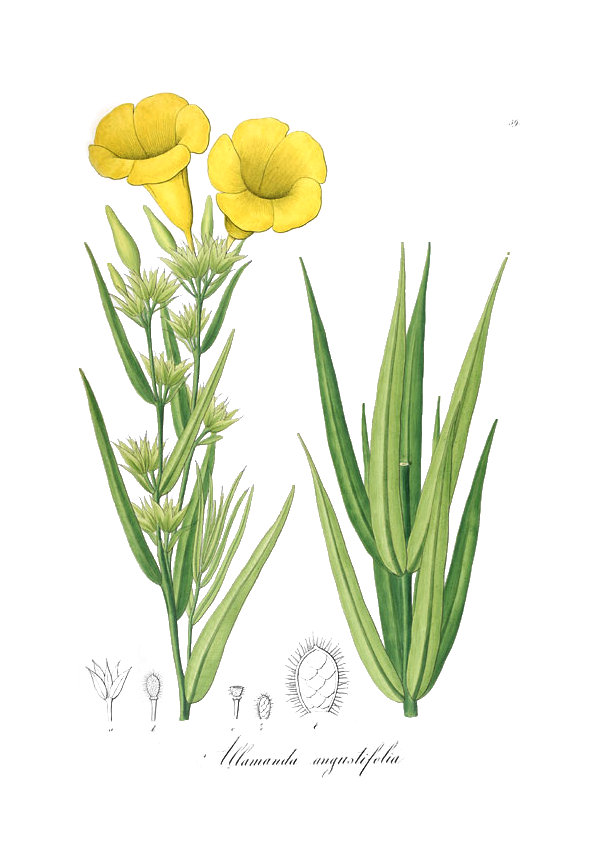

Scientific classification
- Kingdom: Plantae
- Clade: Tracheophytes
- Clade: Angiosperms
- Clade: Eudicots
- Clade: Asterids
- Order: Gentianales
- Family: Apocynaceae
- Genus: Allamanda
- Species: A. angustifolia

Binomial name
- Allamanda angustifolia Pohl

= Allamanda angustifolia =

Species of plant

Allamanda angustifolia is a species of plant in the genus Allamanda in the family Apocynaceae, which is found in Brazil, typically in Cerrado vegetation. This plant is cited in Flora Brasiliensis by Carl Friedrich Philipp von Martius. Known in English as alamander, it has been widely cultivated and naturalized in Florida and elsewhere in the United States.
