= Paramachaerium schunkei =

Conservation status
- Vulnerable (IUCN 2.3)

Scientific classification
- Kingdom: Plantae
- Clade: Tracheophytes
- Clade: Angiosperms
- Clade: Eudicots
- Clade: Rosids
- Order: Fabales
- Family: Fabaceae
- Subfamily: Faboideae
- Genus: Paramachaerium
- Species: P. schunkei

Binomial name
- Paramachaerium schunkei Rudd

Species of plant

Paramachaerium schunkei is a species of flowering plant in the family Fabaceae. It is found only in Peru. The species was described and named by Velva E. Rudd in 1981.
