= Centrolobium microchaete =

Scientific classification
- Kingdom: Plantae
- Clade: Tracheophytes
- Clade: Angiosperms
- Clade: Eudicots
- Clade: Rosids
- Order: Fabales
- Family: Fabaceae
- Subfamily: Faboideae
- Genus: Centrolobium
- Species: C. microchaete

Binomial name
- Centrolobium microchaete (Benth.) H.C.Lima

Synonyms
- Centrolobium robustum var. microchaete Mart. ex Benth. 1862

Species of legume

Centrolobium microchaete is a species of flowering plant. It was first described by George Bentham, and given its exact name by Haroldo Cavalcante de Lima. Centrolobium microchaete is part of the genus Centrolobium, and the family Fabaceae. This species grows as a tree in seasonally dry tropical biomes, and is distributed in Brazil.

== Description ==
It is a heliophyte tree, large, over 27 m tall and up to 13 dm in trunk diameter, straight, cylindrical; sometimes hollow in the first few meters; cracked bark, longitudinal fissures; asymmetrical crown. Leaves compound, imparipinnate, 13-19-folioles, 6-9 cm long, pinnately veined, yellowish scales on the underside; dark green on the adaxial side.

Annual, synchronous flowering; tiny, yellowish flowers in terminal panicles; persistent calyx with basal glands, 10-stamens (monadelphous), ovary sessile to briefly stipitate, punctate, glandular, 1-3 ovules, curved style. Indehiscent fruit, samaroid, distal wing, 1-2 seeds, acicular spiny chamber; style persistent as a lateral spine; it is three times the size of the chamber, covered with peltate scales. Anemophilous seed dispersal, up to 100 m away; a large quantity of the seed is not viable.
