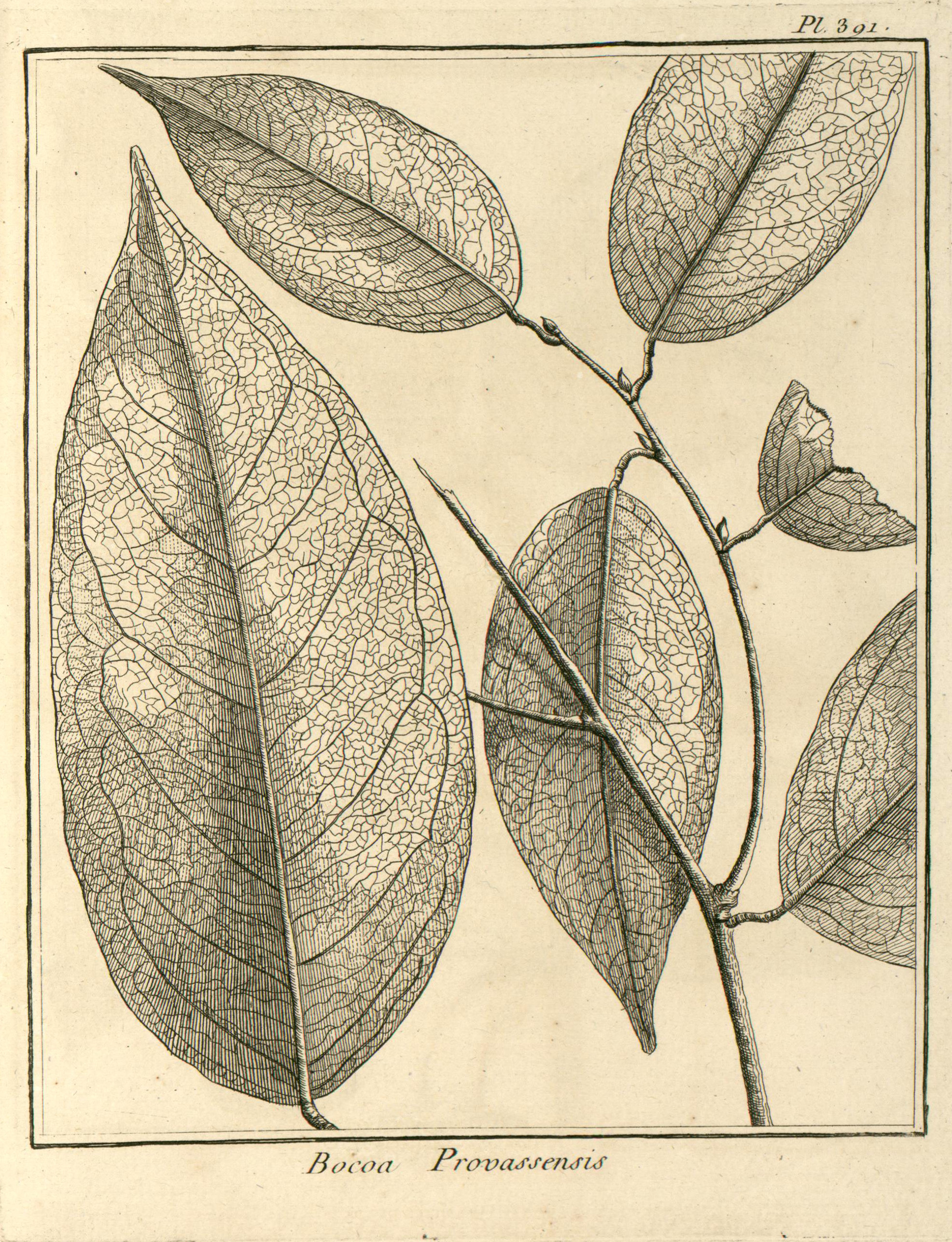
- Bocoa prouacensis

Scientific classification
- Kingdom: Plantae
- Clade: Embryophytes
- Clade: Tracheophytes
- Clade: Spermatophytes
- Clade: Angiosperms
- Clade: Eudicots
- Clade: Rosids
- Order: Fabales
- Family: Fabaceae
- Subfamily: Faboideae
- Tribe: Swartzieae
- Genus: Bocoa; Aubl. (1775)

Type species
- Bocoa prouacensis Aublet

Species
- Bocoa marionii Aymard & H.E.Ireland; Bocoa prouacensis Aublet; Bocoa ratteri H. E. Ireland; Bocoa viridiflora (Ducke) R. S. Cowan

Synonyms
- Gajanus Rumph. ex Kuntze (1891)

= Bocoa =

Genus of legumes

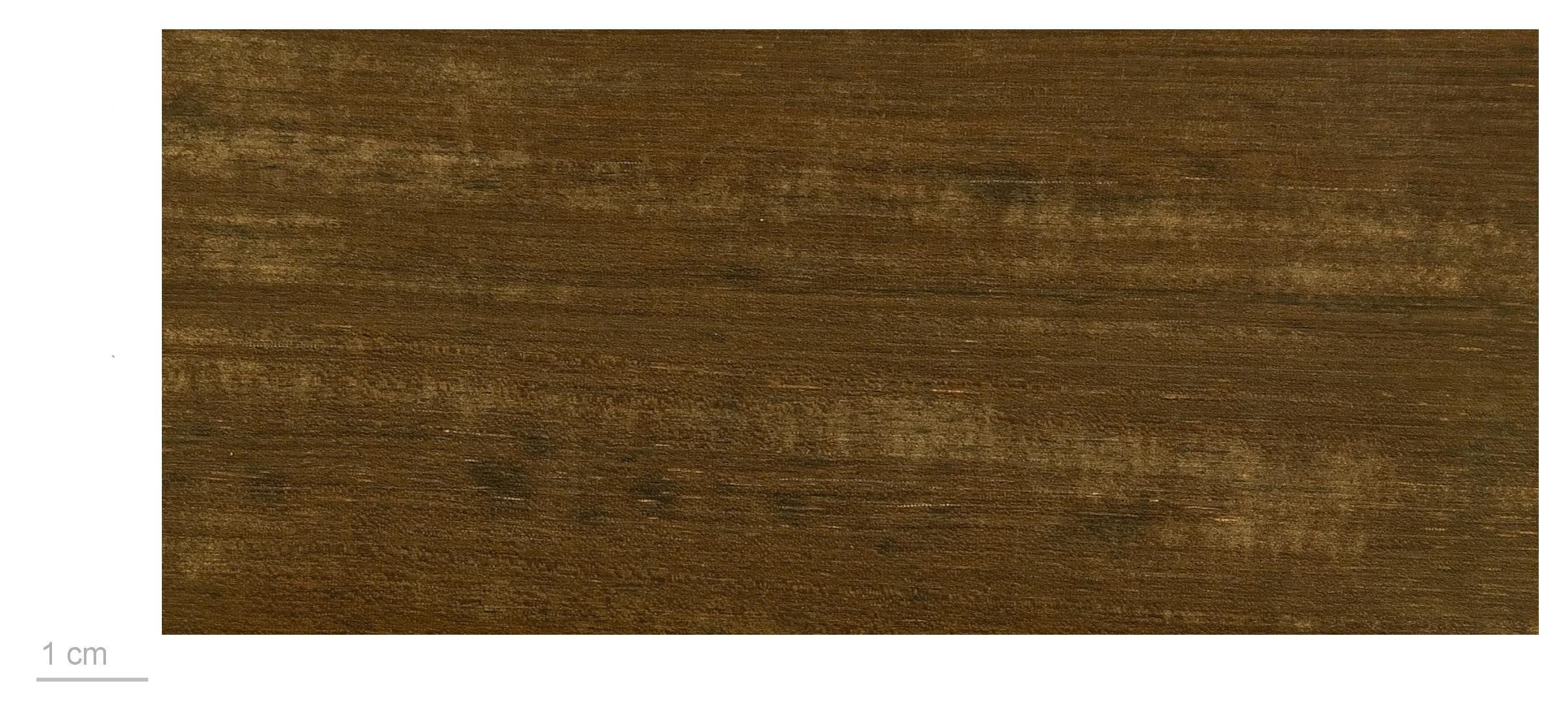
Bocoa prouacensis - MHNT

Bocoa is a genus of flowering plants in the legume family, Fabaceae (Leguminosae). It belongs to the subfamily Faboideae (Papilionoideae). Several species in the genus were recently reclassified as Trischidium.

The genus is largely limited to the Guiana Shield and Brazil. Bocoa prouacensis is the type species for this genus. Its name is derived from "Boco d'Aprouak" where Aprouak refers to the Approuague river in French Guiana. It is predominantly found in French Guiana but is also substantially present in Suriname. Timber from this species is one of the hardest and densest in the world. B. viridiflora is the largest tree in the genus, reaching 30 m. in height, and is the most widely distributed. Specimens sources for B. ratteri are limited to Maranhão, Brazil. The newest member of Bocoa to be described is B. marionii. It was found in the Upper Essequibo region of Guyana and is most morphologically similar to B. prouacensis.
