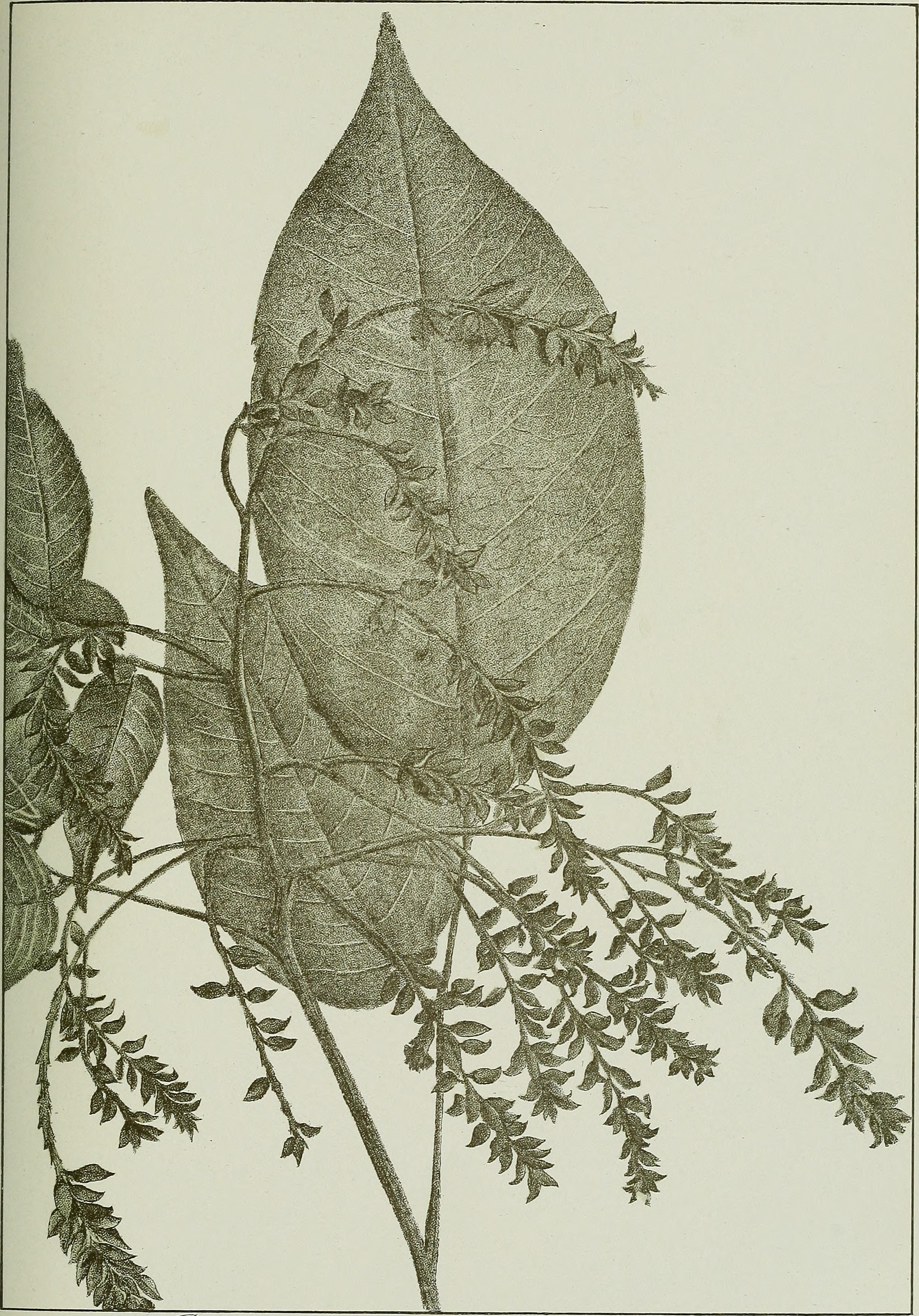
- Paramachaerium ormosioides

Scientific classification
- Kingdom: Plantae
- Clade: Tracheophytes
- Clade: Angiosperms
- Clade: Eudicots
- Clade: Rosids
- Order: Fabales
- Family: Fabaceae
- Subfamily: Faboideae
- Tribe: Dalbergieae
- Genus: Paramachaerium; Ducke

Species
- See text

= Paramachaerium =

Genus of legumes

Paramachaerium is a genus of flowering plants in the family Fabaceae native to Amazonia. It was recently assigned to the informal monophyletic Pterocarpus clade within the Dalbergieae.

== Species ==
Paramachaerium comprises the following species:

- Paramachaerium gruberi Brizicky
- Paramachaerium krukovii Rudd
- Paramachaerium ormosioides (Ducke) Ducke
- Paramachaerium schomburgkii (Benth.) Ducke
- Paramachaerium schunkei Rudd
