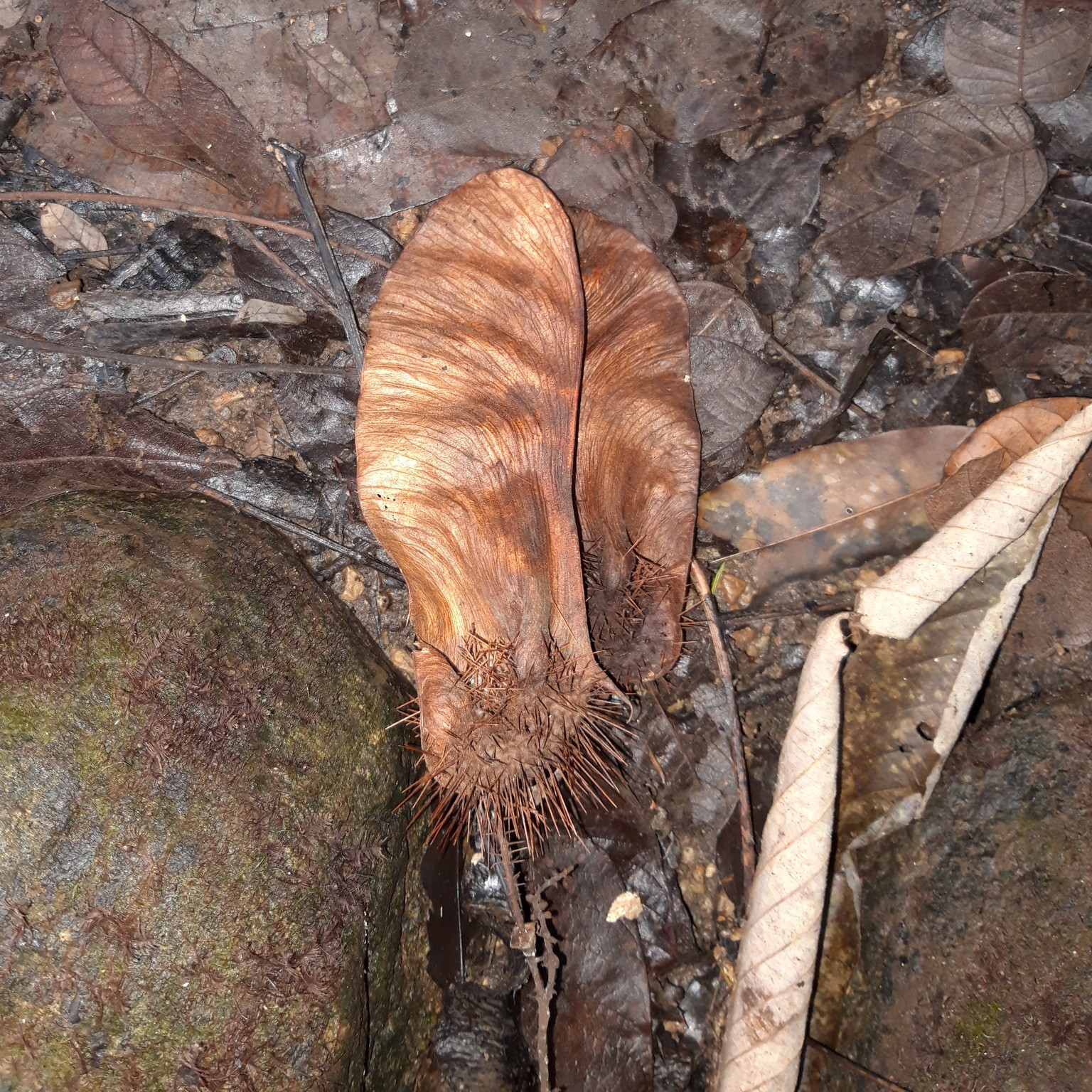
- Winged samara

Conservation status
- Data Deficient (IUCN 3.1)

Scientific classification
- Kingdom: Plantae
- Clade: Tracheophytes
- Clade: Angiosperms
- Clade: Eudicots
- Clade: Rosids
- Order: Fabales
- Family: Fabaceae
- Subfamily: Faboideae
- Genus: Centrolobium
- Species: C. yavizanum

Binomial name
- Centrolobium yavizanum Pitt.

= Centrolobium yavizanum =

Species of legume

Centrolobium yavizanum, the amarillo guayaquil or amarillo puyú, is a species of flowering plant in the family Fabaceae. It is found in Colombia and Panama. It is threatened by habitat loss.
