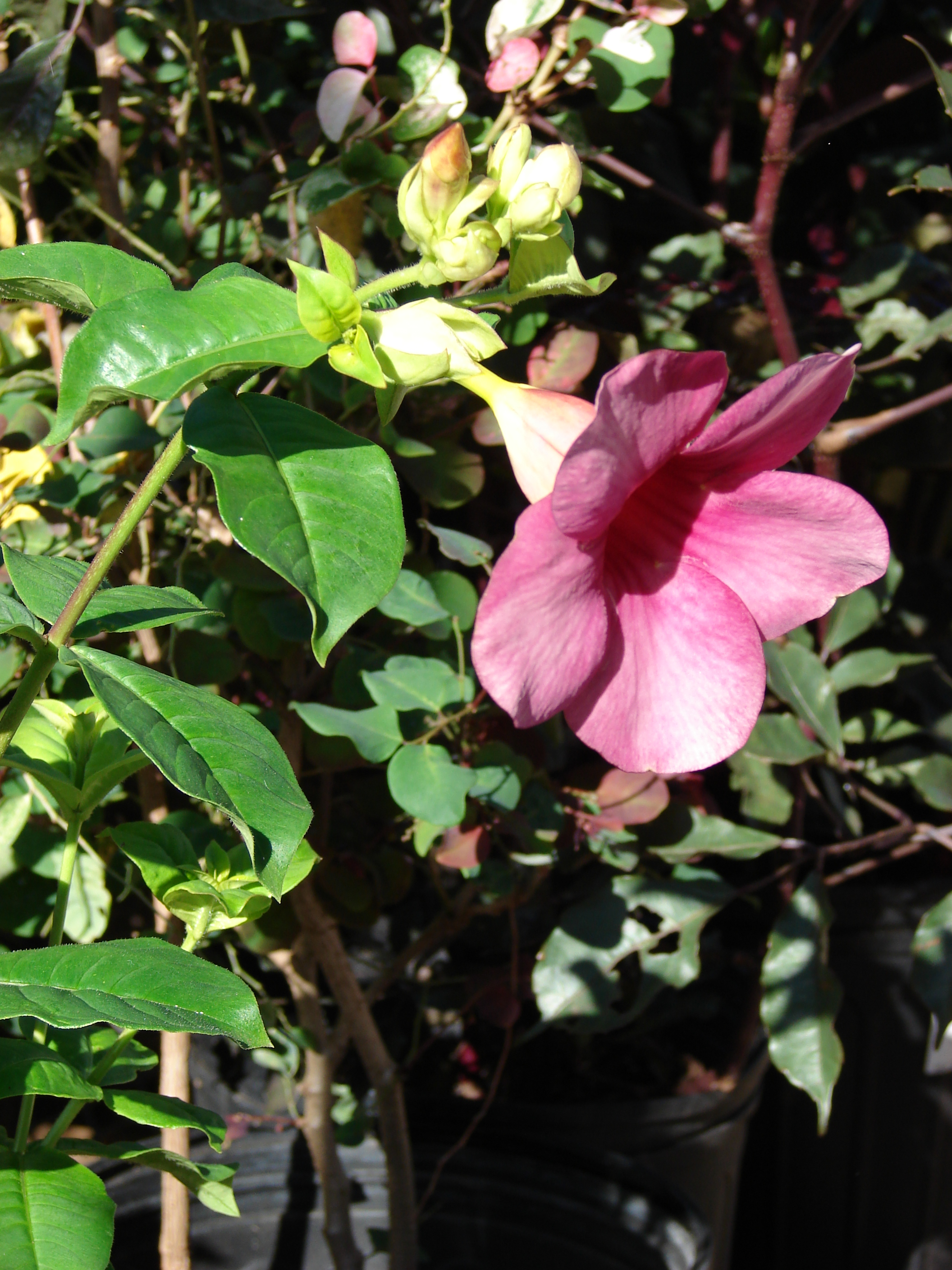

Scientific classification
- Kingdom: Plantae
- Clade: Tracheophytes
- Clade: Angiosperms
- Clade: Eudicots
- Clade: Asterids
- Order: Gentianales
- Family: Apocynaceae
- Genus: Allamanda
- Species: A. blanchetii

Binomial name
- Allamanda blanchetii A.DC.

= Allamanda blanchetii =

Species of plant

Allamanda blanchetii (purple allamanda, violet allamanda; Pilaghanti in Sanskrit syn. Allamanda violacea) is a species of perennial flowering plant in the family Apocynaceae native to Brazil. Cultivated as an ornamental plant, it grows in full sun in USDA Zones 9b through 11 including central and south Florida, southernmost Texas, and coastal California. This plant's purple, bell-shaped blooms are about 3" across. It is also called red bell. From the stem, fiber can be extracted which is very strong and silky white after chemical treatment.

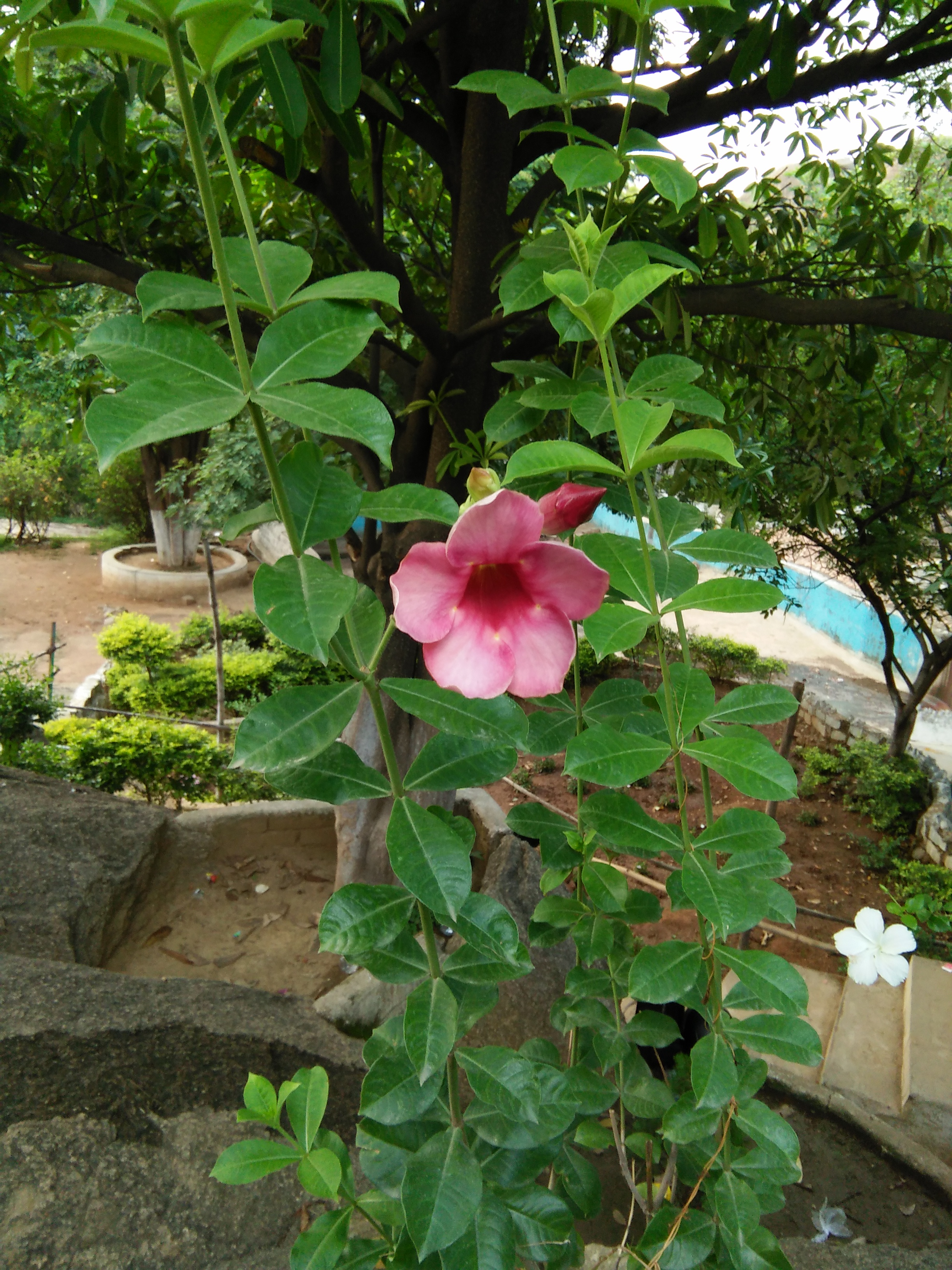
Allamanda blanchetii flowers and foliage in Jharkhand, India.
