= Ateleia salicifolia =

Conservation status
- Vulnerable (IUCN 2.3)

Scientific classification
- Kingdom: Plantae
- Clade: Tracheophytes
- Clade: Angiosperms
- Clade: Eudicots
- Clade: Rosids
- Order: Fabales
- Family: Fabaceae
- Subfamily: Faboideae
- Genus: Ateleia
- Species: A. salicifolia

Binomial name
- Ateleia salicifolia Mohl.

Species of legume

Ateleia salicifolia is a species of flowering plant in the family Fabaceae. It is found only in Cuba. It is threatened by habitat loss.
