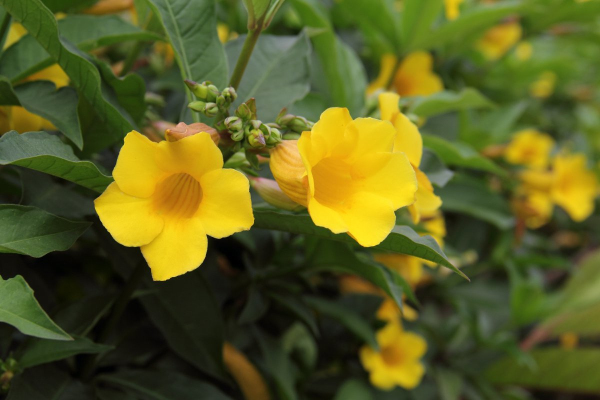

Scientific classification
- Kingdom: Plantae
- Clade: Embryophytes
- Clade: Tracheophytes
- Clade: Spermatophytes
- Clade: Angiosperms
- Clade: Eudicots
- Clade: Asterids
- Order: Gentianales
- Family: Apocynaceae
- Genus: Allamanda
- Species: A. schottii

Binomial name
- Allamanda schottii Pohl

Synonyms
- Allamanda brasiliensis Schott ex Pohl nom. inval.; Allamanda cathartica Schrad. nom. illeg.; Allamanda magnifica B.S.Williams; Allamanda neriifolia Hook.

= Allamanda schottii =

Species of flowering plant

Allamanda schottii, commonly known as bush allamanda, is a shrub of genus Allamanda in the family Apocynaceae, which is native to Brazil. Reaching 2.5 metres (8.2 ft) in height, it bears large yellow flowers for much of the year. Grown as an ornamental plant, it has become a weed in several countries.

== Taxonomy ==
This species was grown by Johann Baptist Emanuel Pohl, who reported it grew on the banks of the Paraíba River. in 1827. William Hooker described a plant that he concluded had smaller deeper-yellow flowers than A. schottii in cultivation in Exeter as Allamanda neriifolia. This has since been considered a synonym of A. schottii. It is listed in Flora Brasiliensis by Carl Friedrich Philipp von Martius.

As well as bush allamanda, common names include Schott's common allamanda and oleander allamanda.

== Description ==
Unlike many members of the genus, A. schottii is a shrub rather than a vine, growing to 1.5 to 3 m (5–10 ft) tall and around 2 m (6–8 ft) wide. The elliptic to obovate leaves are arranged in whorls of 3–5 or are subopposite along the stem, and measure 2–14 cm long and 1.1–4 cm wide. The large yellow flowers are terminal (i.e. appearing at the ends of branches), and can appear year-round but predominantly in spring.

The spiny fruits appear mostly in summer.

== Distribution and habitat ==
Allamanda schottii is found in the south and southeast of Brazil, in the states of Espírito Santo, Minas Gerais, Rio de Janeiro, São Paulo, Paraná and Santa Catarina. Previously considered endemic to that country, it was reported from northeastern Argentina in 2013. In Brazil, it grows near or alongside bodies of water, often in wet areas, in open or closed forests.

Allamanda schottii has become naturalised in Puerto Rico, the Galapagos Islands and Costa Rica. It is reported to have escaped from cultivation in Australia.

== Ecology ==
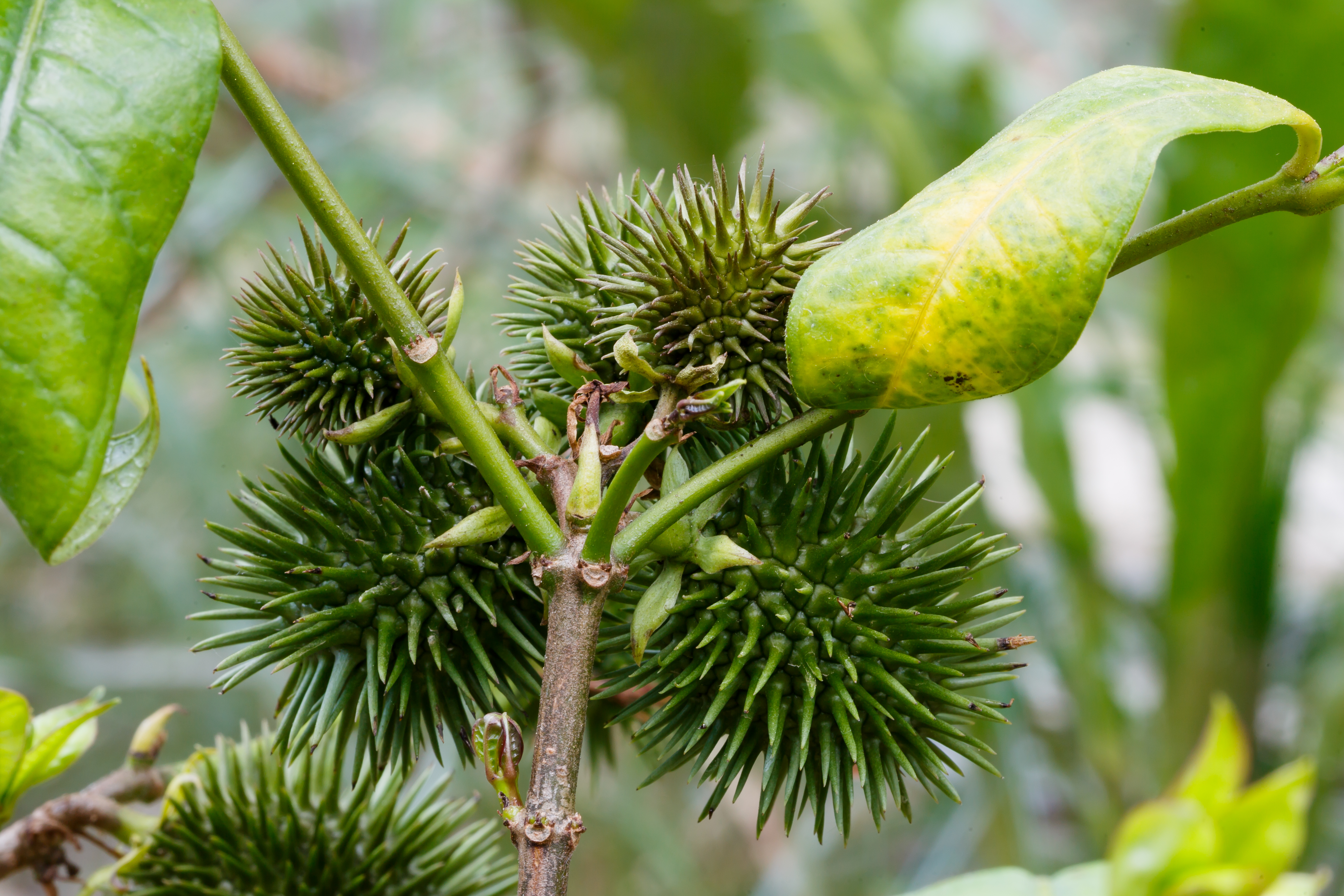
fruit

The flowers are pollinated by butterflies of the genus Phoebis, while bees and wasps also visit the flowers.

The stems and leaves of Allamanda schottii contain a milky sap that is an irritant. The plant contains plumericin, which causes gastrointestinal irritation.

== Cultivation ==
It is hardy to zones 10–11 and tolerant of dry spells. It grows best in rich, well-drained soil and benefits from regular pruning, becoming spindly otherwise.

The cultivar Allamanda "Silver dwarf discovery" is less vigorous with silvery leaves.
