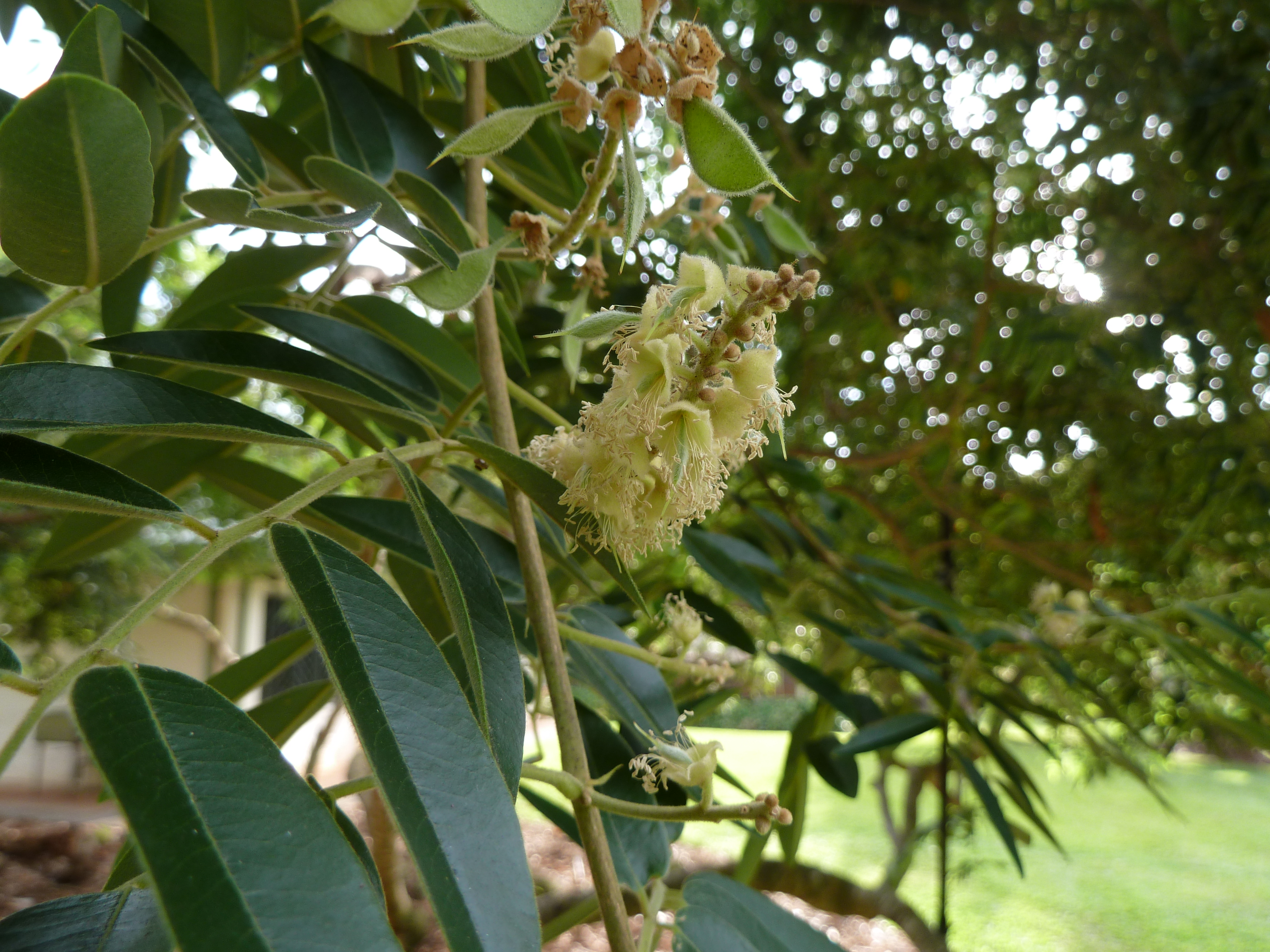
- Cyathostegia mathewsii

Scientific classification
- Kingdom: Plantae
- Clade: Tracheophytes
- Clade: Angiosperms
- Clade: Eudicots
- Clade: Rosids
- Order: Fabales
- Family: Fabaceae
- Subfamily: Faboideae
- Tribe: Swartzieae
- Genus: Cyathostegia (Benth.) Schery

Species
- Cyathostegia mathewsii (Benth.) Schery; Cyathostegia weberbaueri (Harms) Schery

= Cyathostegia =

Genus of legumes

Cyathostegia is a genus of flowering plants in the legume family, Fabaceae. It belongs to the subfamily Faboideae. It contains two species native to Peru and Ecuador. It is often considered to be a monotypic genus containing only Cyathostegia mathewsii. Some sources include Cyathostegia weberbaueri.
