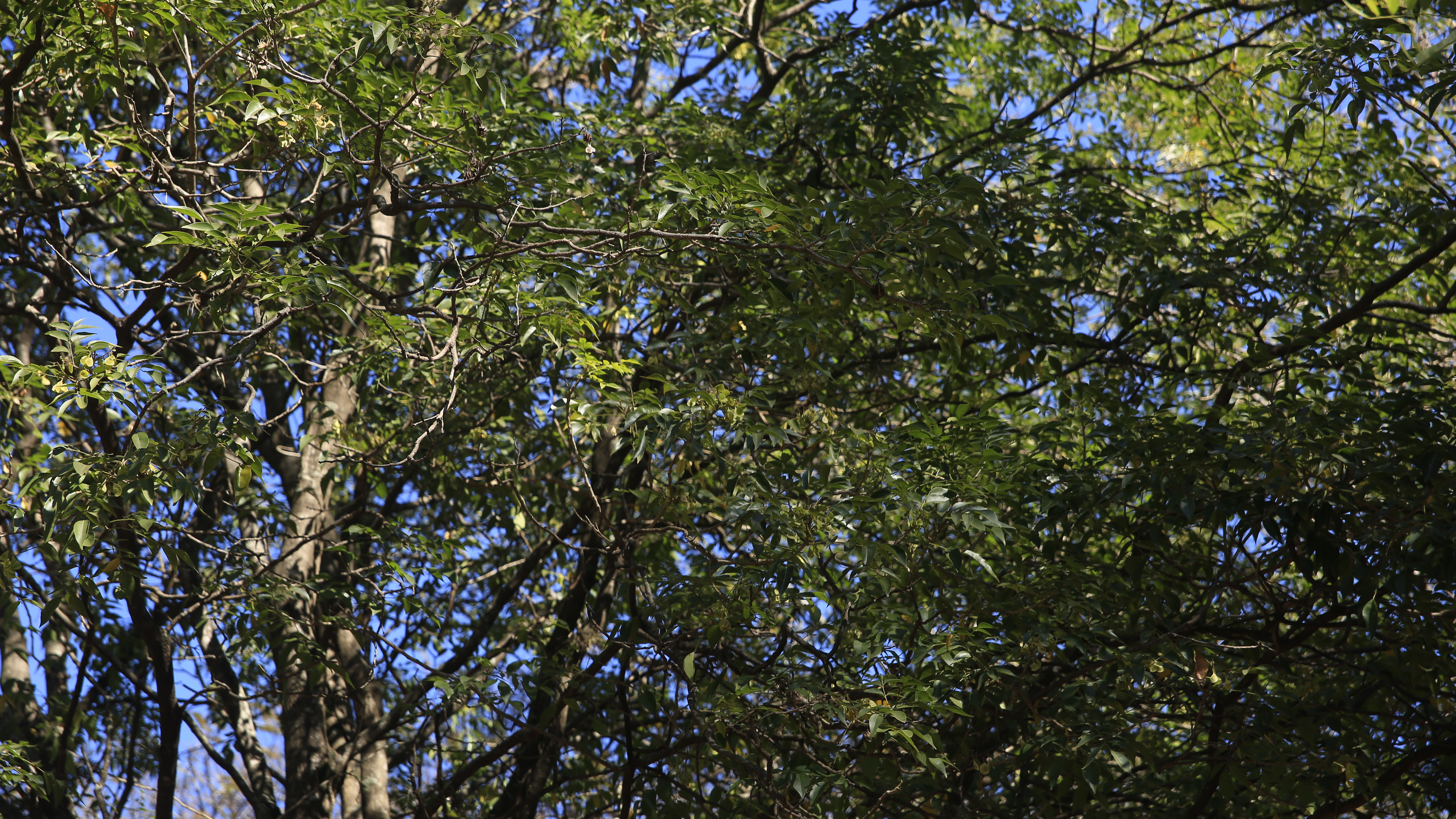
- Ateleia ovata behind DAC unicamp, Campinas (SP) Brasil; green fruits can be seen in the left side of the picture.

Scientific classification
- Kingdom: Plantae
- Clade: Tracheophytes
- Clade: Angiosperms
- Clade: Eudicots
- Clade: Rosids
- Order: Fabales
- Family: Fabaceae
- Subfamily: Faboideae
- Tribe: Swartzieae
- Genus: Ateleia (DC.) Benth.

Species
- See text

= Ateleia =

Genus of legumes

Ateleia is a genus of legume in the family Fabaceae. It contains the following species:

- Ateleia albolutescens Mohlenbr.
- Ateleia apetala Griseb.
- Ateleia arsenii Standl.
- Ateleia glazioveana Baill.
- Ateleia gummifera (Bertero ex DC.) D. Dietr.
- Ateleia guaraya Herzog
- Ateleia herbert-smithii Pittier
- Ateleia insularis Standl.
- Ateleia mcvaughii Rudd
- Ateleia microcarpa (Pers.) D. Dietr.
- Ateleia ovata Mohlenbr.
- Ateleia popenoei Correll
- Ateleia pterocarpa D. Dietr.
- Ateleia salicifolia Mohlenbr.
- Ateleia standleyana Mohlenbr.
- Ateleia tomentosa Rudd
- Ateleia truncata Mohlenbr.
- Ateleia venezuelensis Mohlenbr.
