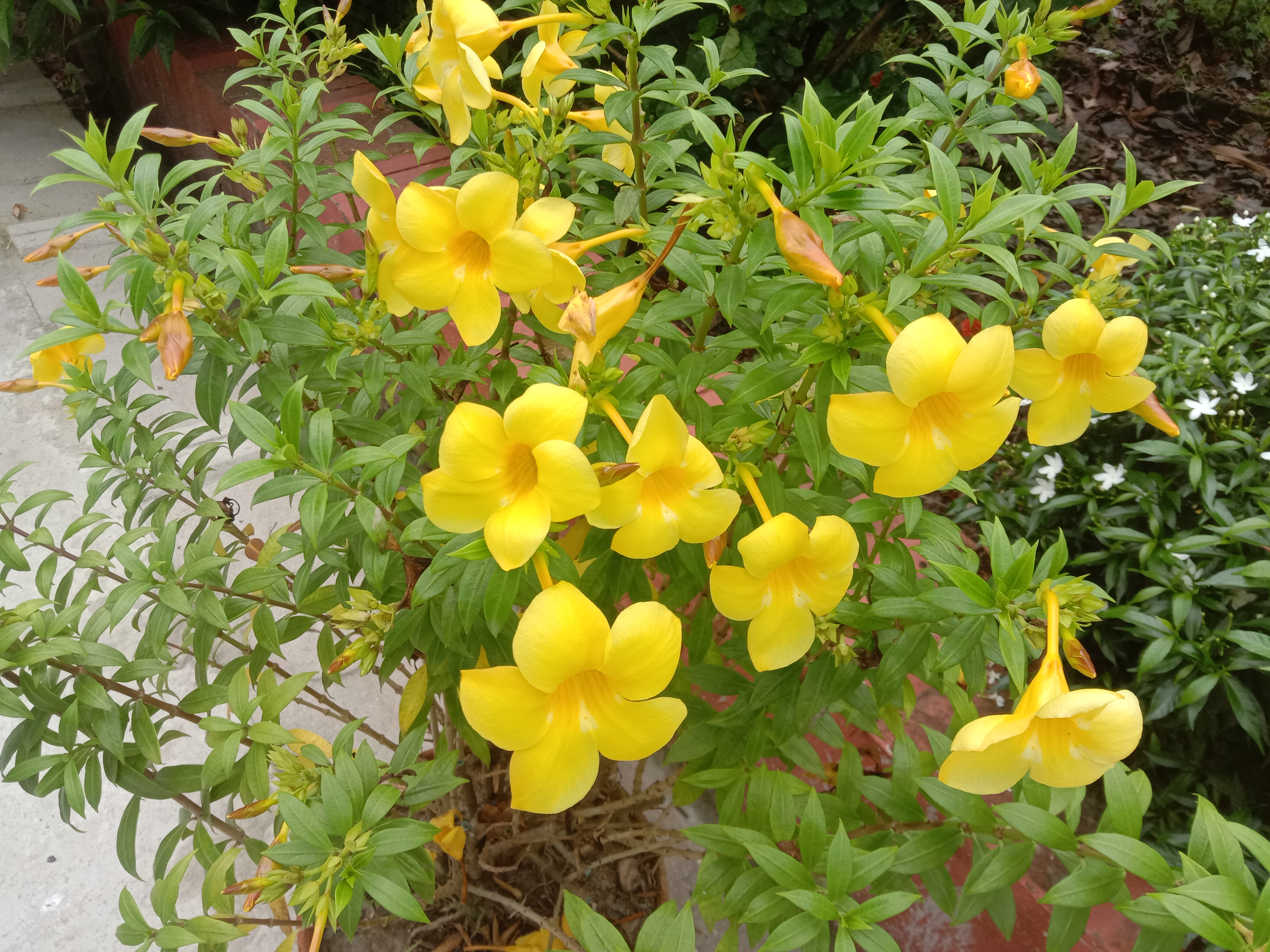

Scientific classification
- Kingdom: Plantae
- Clade: Embryophytes
- Clade: Tracheophytes
- Clade: Angiosperms
- Clade: Eudicots
- Clade: Asterids
- Order: Gentianales
- Family: Apocynaceae
- Genus: Allamanda
- Species: A. cathartica

Binomial name
- Allamanda cathartica L.

Synonyms
- Allamanda aubletii Pohl; Allamanda chelsonii K.Koch nom. inval.; Allamanda grandiflora (Aubl.) Lam. nom. illeg.; Allamanda hendersonii W.Bull ex Dombrain; Allamanda latifolia C.Presl; Allamanda linnaei Pohl; Allamanda salicifolia hort.; Allamanda schottii Hook. nom. illeg.; Allamanda wardleyana Lebas; Allamanda williamsii auct.; Echites salicifolius Willd. ex Roem. & Schult.; Echites verticillatus Sessé & Moc.; Orelia grandiflora Aubl. nom. illeg.

= Allamanda cathartica =

Species of plant

Allamanda cathartica, commonly called golden trumpet, common trumpetvine, and yellow allamanda, is a species of flowering plant in the family Apocynaceae. It is native to Bolivia, Brazil, French Guiana, Guyana, Suriname, and Venezuela, and widely naturalised elsewhere in the tropics. This plant is cited in Flora Brasiliensis by Carl Friedrich Philipp von Martius.

It does not twine, nor does it have tendrils or aerial roots. It can be pruned into a shrub form. If not pruned it can sprawl to a height of 6 m (20 ft). According to McMullen, it can be up to 15 m (49 ft) in length in the Galapagos Islands where it is naturalised.

The city of Canóvanas, Puerto Rico has adopted this species, known locally as canario amarillo, as its official flower.

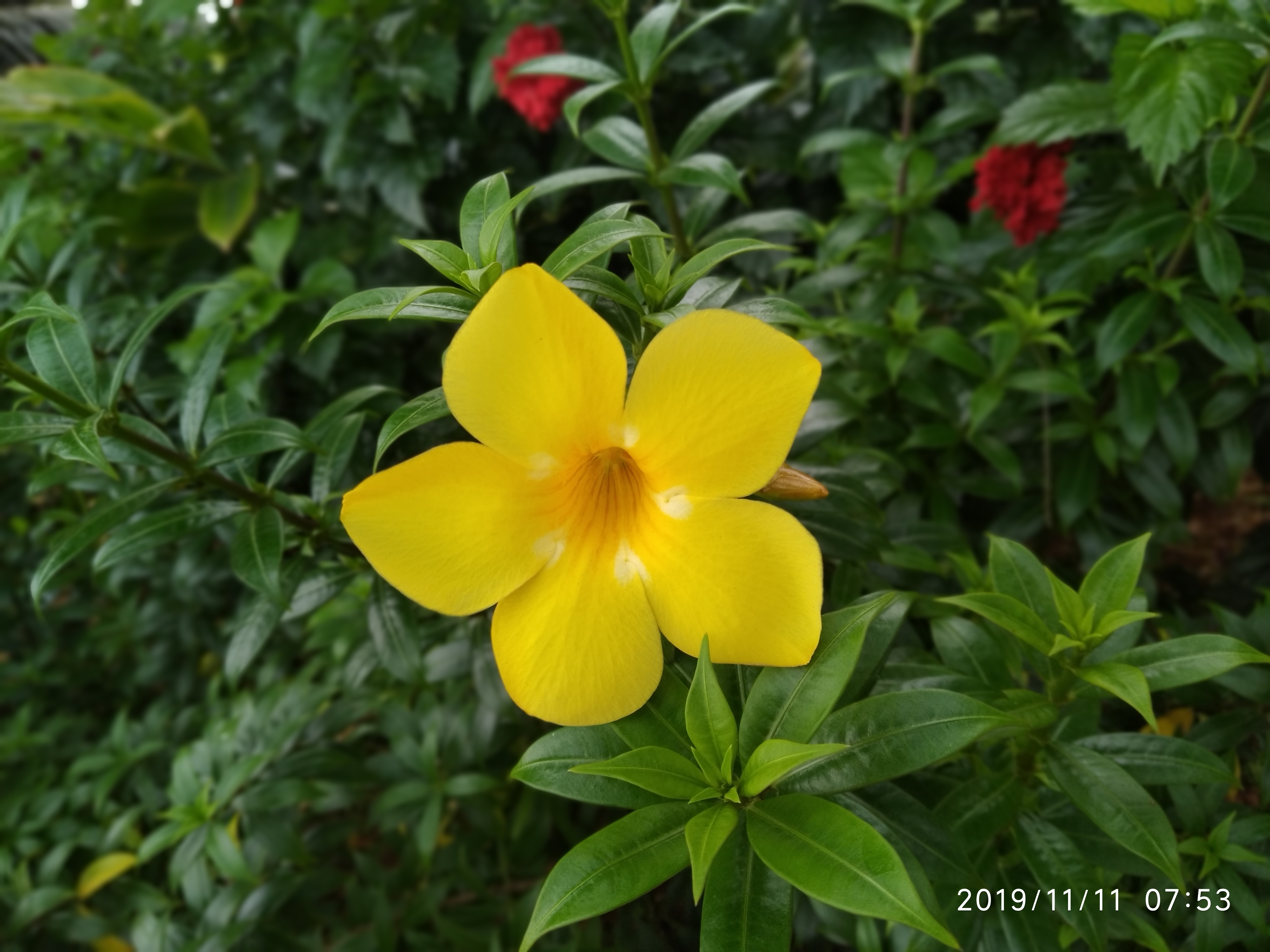
Allamanda cathartica flower at Tagore park Mahe district of Puducherry UT, India

== Cultivation ==
The species is cultivated as a house plant. It requires a soil rich in organic matter, temperatures of not less than 18 °C (64 °F) during the growing season, plenty of moisture, and bright light but not direct sunlight. During the rest season from October to March, the plant should be watered more sparingly and can endure temperatures down to 13 °C (55 °F). It should be repotted every year until it is in a container of 40–50 cm (16–20 in). Propagation is by cuttings taken from April to May.

== Gallery ==
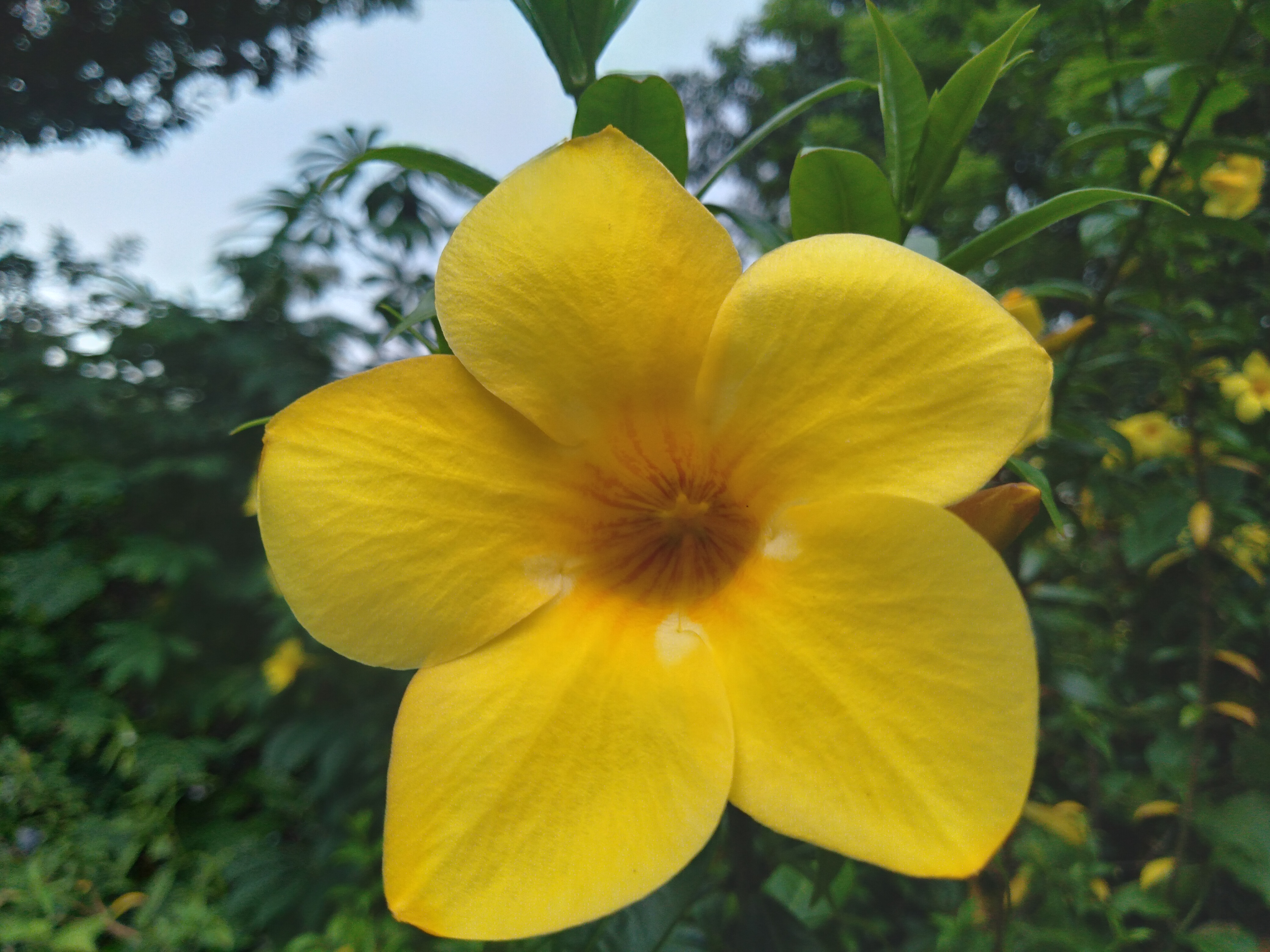
Single flower

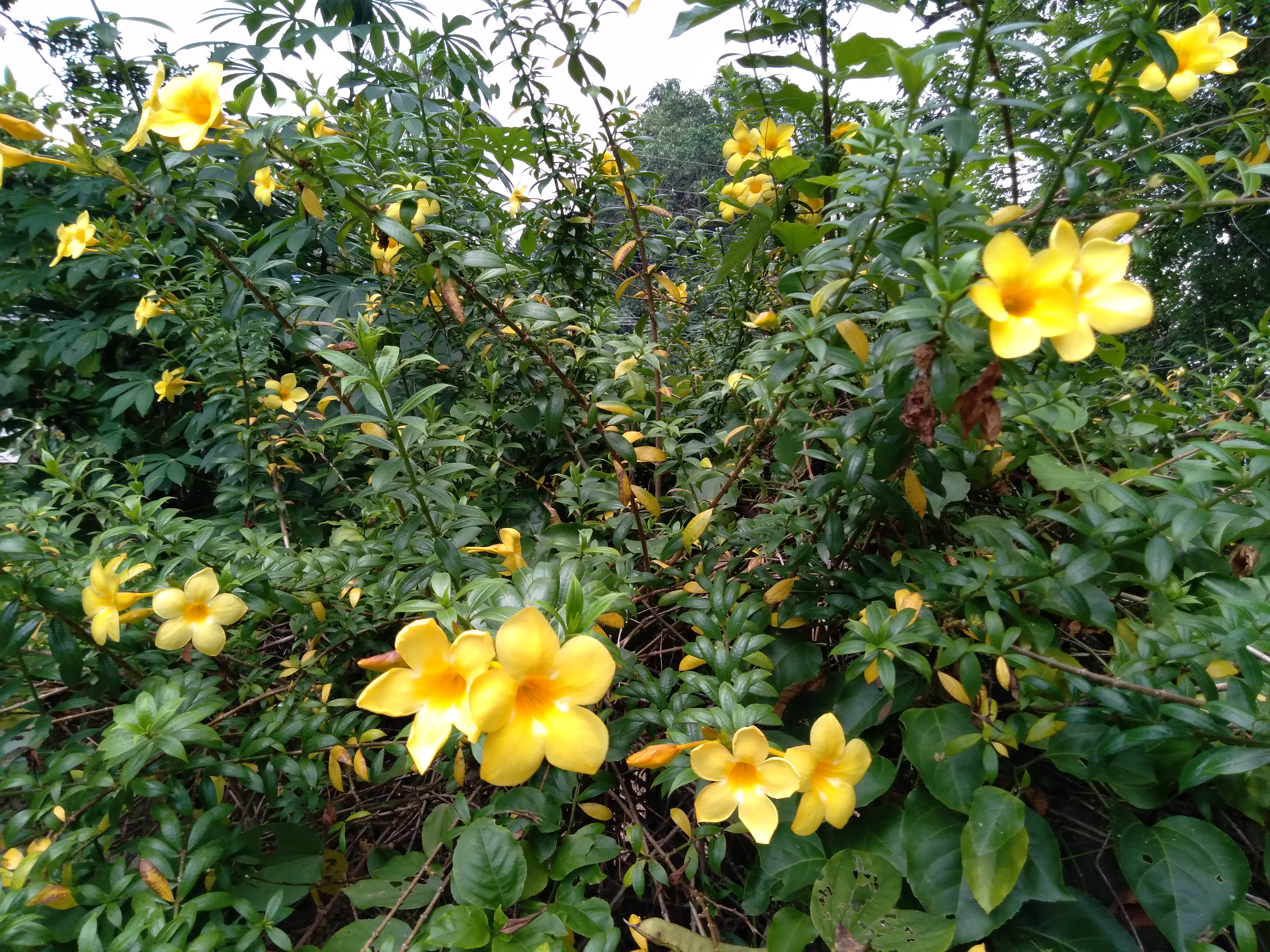
Mid-shot of shrub

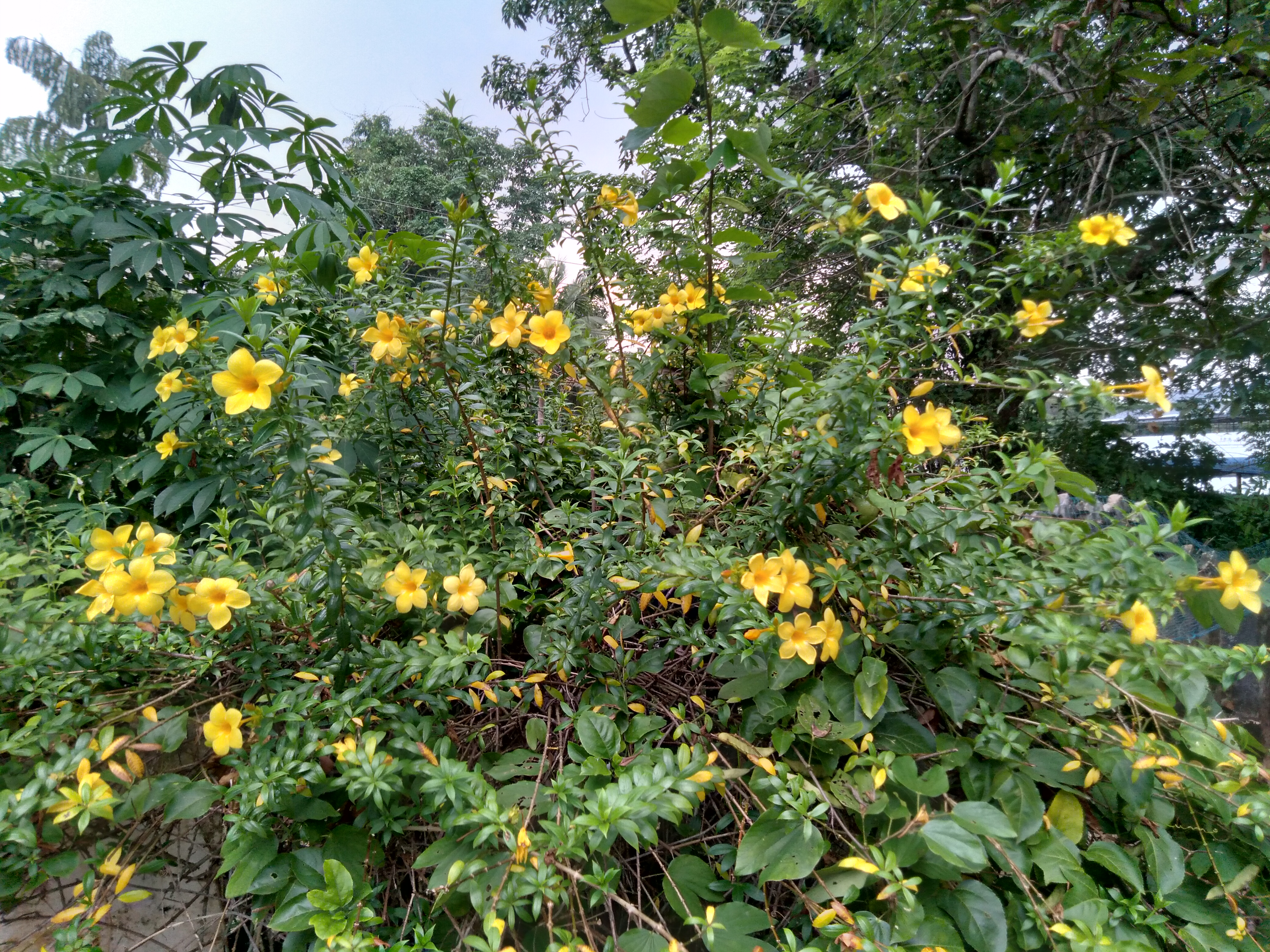
Long-shot of shrub

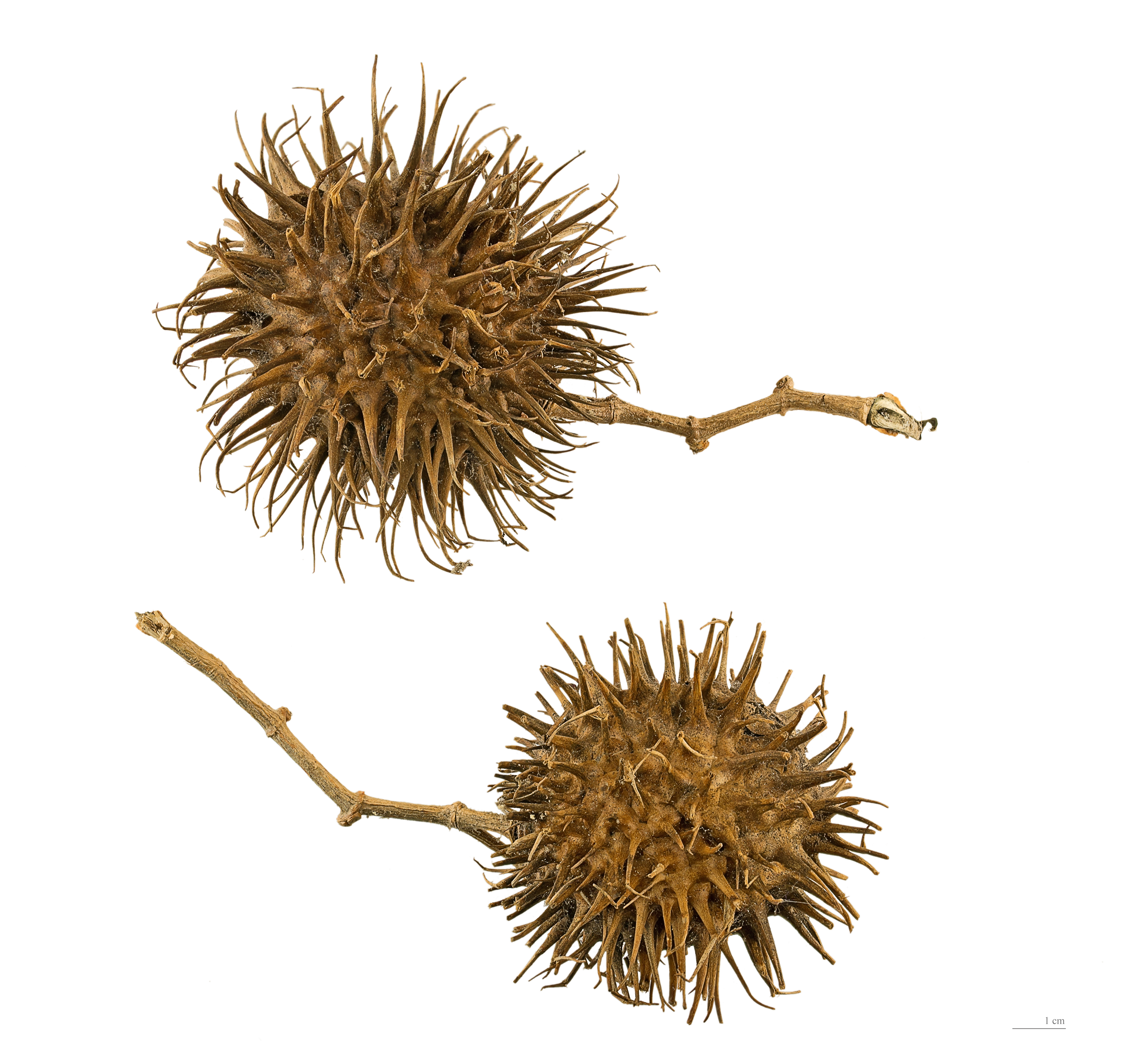
Spiny fruits (ripe and detached from plant)
