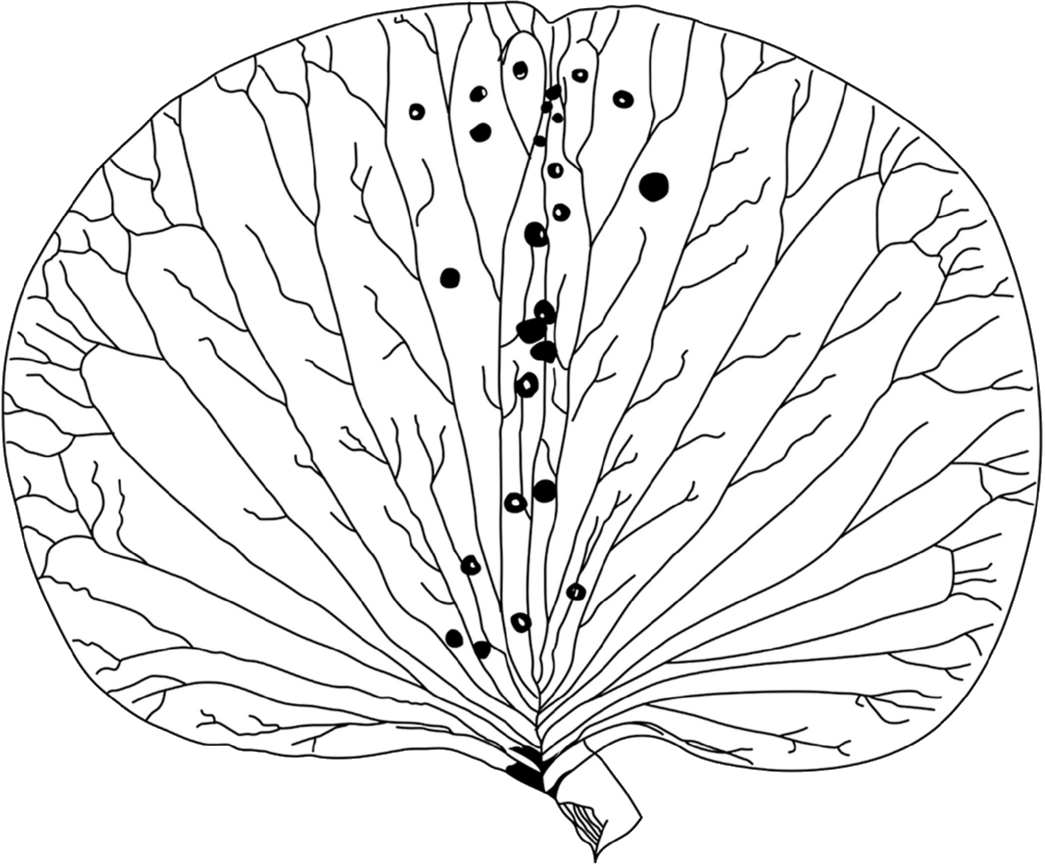
- Petal inner surface illustration

Scientific classification
- Kingdom: Plantae
- Clade: Tracheophytes
- Clade: Angiosperms
- Clade: Eudicots
- Clade: Rosids
- Order: Fabales
- Family: Fabaceae
- Subfamily: Faboideae
- Genus: Weberbauerella
- Species: W. raimondiana

Binomial name
- Weberbauerella raimondiana Ferreyra

= Weberbauerella raimondiana =

Genus of legumes

Weberbauerella raimondiana is a South American species of flowering plant in the family Fabaceae.

It was first described by Ramón Ferreyra in 1951; he found it along the coast of Peru, south of Ica and north of the known locations of Weberbauerella brongniartioides.
