= Pictetia =

Scientific classification
- Kingdom: Plantae
- Clade: Tracheophytes
- Clade: Angiosperms
- Clade: Eudicots
- Clade: Rosids
- Order: Fabales
- Family: Fabaceae
- Subfamily: Faboideae
- Tribe: Dalbergieae
- Genus: Pictetia; DC.

Species
- Pictetia aculeata (Vahl) Urb.; Pictetia angustifolia Griseb.; Pictetia jussiaei DC.; Pictetia marginata C. Wright; Pictetia mucronata (Griseb.) Beyra & Lavin; Pictetia nipensis (Urb.) Beyra & Lavin; Pictetia obcordata DC.; Pictetia pubescens Hochst.; Pictetia spinosa (A. Rich.) Beyra & Lavin; Pictetia sulcata (P. Beauv.) Beyra & Lavin

Synonyms
- Belairia A.Rich. 1845

Genus of legumes

Pictetia is a genus of about eight species of trees and shrubs in the family Fabaceae with spiny stems and (in six of the eight species) spine-tipped leaflets. The genus is endemic to the Greater Antilles, but its closest relatives are in Mesoamerica and Africa.

== Description ==
Species of Pictetia range from erect, single-stemmed trees to multi-stemmed shrubs. They can have smooth or scaly bark. The leaves and branches branch off from the stem in an alternate pattern. The stems are spiny, as are the tips of the leaflets in all species except P. spinosa and P. nipensis. The leaves are pinnately compound with an odd number of leaflets. The leaflets, like the leaves, are arranged in an alternating fashion.

The flowers, which are the typical pea flowers of the Faboideae, are borne in racemes. The flowers either grow singly or in clusters along the raceme. The fruit is a flattened legume with prominent veins running along its length.

== Taxonomy ==
The genus Pictetia was described by Swiss botanist A.P. de Candolle in 1825. De Candolle's concept of the genus included all woody legumes with papilionoid flowers and spine-tipped leaflets which originated in the West Indies. When German botanist Ignatz Urban revised the genus in 1900 he split de Canolle's genus into two series, Racemosa and Fasciculatae. The genus Belairia was described by French botanist Achille Richard in 1845. Urban considered the genus Belairia to be closely related to Pictetia series Fasciculatae. In their 1999 monograph on Pictetia, Angela Beyra and Matt Lavin determined that the four species in the genus Belairia was nested within Pictetia and concluded that the genera were thus synonymous. De Candolle's original description of the genus did not designate a type species. Beyra and Lavin designated P. obcordata the lectotype since it was, in their analysis, the species with the fewest specialised traits.

=== Evolution ===
Pictetia is a member of the tribe Dalbergieae. Within that tribe, it was recently assigned to the informal monophyletic Dalbergia clade. The trans-Atlantic distribution of Pictetia and other closely related genera led Beyra and Lavin to conclude that Pictetia was likely to be an "early Tertiary vicariant"—in other words, that the ancestors of the genus where already present in its current range before South America and Africa split apart. However, based on nucleotide substitution rates, Pictetia was later estimated to be 7.2 ± 1.2 million years old, while Diphysa and Pictetia shared common ancestry 15.0 ± 2.5 million years ago and Pictetia and Ormocarpum separated by 14.5 ± 2.6 million years. This suggests that the presence of Pictetia in the Caribbean reflects the dispersal of its ancestral species into the region long after the islands became isolated from the mainland. The overall distribution of these genera requires at least one dispersal event across the Atlantic Ocean, given that the genera share common ancestry long after the separation of South America and Africa.

== Distribution ==
Pictetia is restricted to Cuba, Hispaniola, Puerto Rico and the British and U.S. Virgin Islands. P. aculeata, the species with the easternmost distribution, is found in the British and U.S. Virgin Islands and Puerto Rico. P. obcordata which is endemic to the island of Hispaniola, is found both in the Dominican Republic and in Haiti. P. sulcata is found both in Hispaniola and Cuba, while the remaining species (P. angustifolia, P. marginata, P. mucronata, P. nipensis and P. spinosa) are Cuban endemics.
