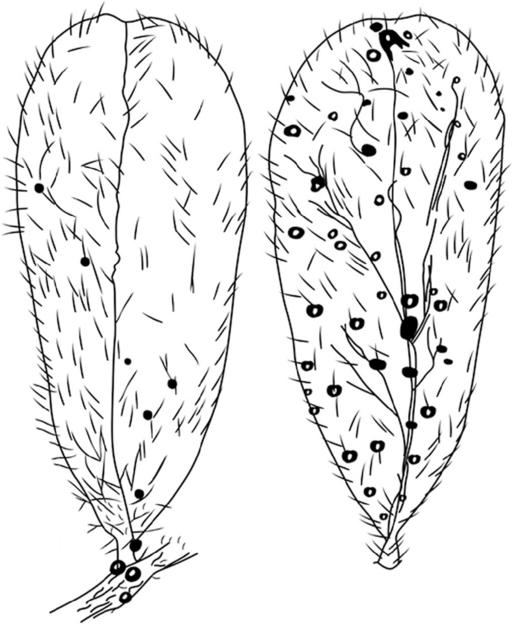
- Leaflets. Left: adaxial surface; right: abaxial surface.

Scientific classification
- Kingdom: Plantae
- Clade: Tracheophytes
- Clade: Angiosperms
- Clade: Eudicots
- Clade: Rosids
- Order: Fabales
- Family: Fabaceae
- Subfamily: Faboideae
- Genus: Weberbauerella
- Species: W. chilensis

Binomial name
- Weberbauerella chilensis Faúndez & Saldivia

= Weberbauerella chilensis =

Species of plant

Weberbauerella chilensis is a legume species taxonomically similar to W. brogniartiodes; with a prostrate habit and shorter leaflets.

This species was found in Peru. It has also been collected in Chile, east of Iquique.
