= Ormocarpopsis =

Scientific classification
- Kingdom: Plantae
- Clade: Tracheophytes
- Clade: Angiosperms
- Clade: Eudicots
- Clade: Rosids
- Order: Fabales
- Family: Fabaceae
- Subfamily: Faboideae
- Tribe: Dalbergieae
- Genus: Ormocarpopsis; R.Vig. (1952)

Type species
- Ormocarpopsis aspera R.Vig.

Species
- 8; see text

Synonyms
- Peltiera Du Puy & Labat (1997)

Genus of legumes

Ormocarpopsis is a genus of flowering plants in the family Fabaceae. It includes eight species of shrubs or small trees endemic to Madagascar. They inhabit seasonally-dry tropical forest, woodland, and xerophytic shrubland, sometimes on rocky outcrops of sandstone or limestone. They are found throughout the island except in the eastern lowland rain forest. The genus was recently assigned to the informal monophyletic Dalbergia clade of the Dalbergieae. It contains the following species:

- Ormocarpopsis anosyana Thulin & Razafim.
- Ormocarpopsis aspera R.Vig.
- Ormocarpopsis calcicola R.Vig.
- Ormocarpopsis itremoensis Du Puy & Labat
- Ormocarpopsis mandrarensis Dumaz-le-Grand
- Ormocarpopsis nitida (Du Puy & Labat) Thulin & Lavin
- Ormocarpopsis parvifolia Dumaz-le-Grand
- Ormocarpopsis tulearensis Du Puy & Labat
