= Zygocarpum =

Scientific classification
- Kingdom: Plantae
- Clade: Tracheophytes
- Clade: Angiosperms
- Clade: Eudicots
- Clade: Rosids
- Order: Fabales
- Family: Fabaceae
- Subfamily: Faboideae
- Tribe: Dalbergieae
- Genus: Zygocarpum; Thulin & Lavin (2001)

Species
- Zygocarpum caeruleum (Balf.f.) Thulin & Lavin; Zygocarpum dhofarense (Hillc. & J.B.Gillett) Thulin & Lavin; Zygocarpum gillettii (Thulin) Thulin & Lavin; Zygocarpum rectangulare (Thulin) Thulin & Lavin; Zygocarpum somalense (J.B.Gillett) Thulin & Lavin; Zygocarpum yemenense (J.B.Gillett) Thulin & Lavin
- Zygocarpum caeruleum (red arrow pointing to island of Socotra) Zygocarpum dhofarense Zygocarpum yemenense Zygocarpum somalense Zygocarpum gillettii Zygocarpum rectangulare

Genus of legumes

Zygocarpum is a genus of flowering plants in the legume family, Fabaceae. It includes six species of shrubs and small trees native to Somalia and Socotra, and to Yemen and Oman on the southwestern Arabian Peninsula. Three species are endemic to Somalia, two to the Arabian Peninsula, and one to Socotra. Typical habitats include seasonally-dry tropical woodland, thicket, and bushland, often on limestone and less often on granite-derived or sandy soils, up to 2000 meters elevation.

The genus was recently assigned to the informal monophyletic Dalbergia clade of the Dalbergieae. A dichotomous key of the species of Zygocarpum has been published.
