= Maraniona =

Scientific classification
- Kingdom: Plantae
- Clade: Tracheophytes
- Clade: Angiosperms
- Clade: Eudicots
- Clade: Rosids
- Order: Fabales
- Family: Fabaceae
- Subfamily: Faboideae
- Tribe: Dalbergieae
- Genus: Maraniona; C.E.Hughes, G.P.Lewis, Daza, & Reynel
- Species: M. lavinii

Binomial name
- Maraniona lavinii C.E.Hughes, G.P.Lewis, Daza, & Reynel

Genus of legumes

Maraniona lavinii is a species of legume in the family Fabaceae, and was recently assigned to the informal monophyletic Pterocarpus clade of the Dalbergieae. It is endemic to the Marañón Valley in northern Peru. It is the only member of the genus Maraniona and is closely related to the genus Tipuana.
