= Cyclocarpa =

Scientific classification
- Kingdom: Plantae
- Clade: Tracheophytes
- Clade: Angiosperms
- Clade: Eudicots
- Clade: Rosids
- Order: Fabales
- Family: Fabaceae
- Subfamily: Faboideae
- Tribe: Dalbergieae
- Genus: Cyclocarpa; Afzel. ex Urb. (1884)
- Species: C. stellaris

Binomial name
- Cyclocarpa stellaris Afzel. ex Baker (1884)

Synonyms
- Aeschynomene stellaris (Afzel. ex Urb.) Roberty (1954)

Genus of legumes

Cyclocarpa stellaris is a species of flowering plant in the legume family, Fabaceae. It is an annual or perennial herb or subshrub. It has a disjunct distribution, from Senegal to Tanzania and Mozambique in sub-Saharan Africa (Sudanian and Zambezian grasslands), in Indochina, Peninsular Malaysia, Borneo, and Java, and in western and northern Australia. It is the only member of the genus Cyclocarpa.

It belongs to the subfamily Faboideae, and was recently assigned to the informal monophyletic Dalbergia clade of the Dalbergieae.
