= Riedeliella =

Scientific classification
- Kingdom: Plantae
- Clade: Tracheophytes
- Clade: Angiosperms
- Clade: Eudicots
- Clade: Rosids
- Order: Fabales
- Family: Fabaceae
- Subfamily: Faboideae
- Tribe: Dalbergieae
- Genus: Riedeliella; Harms (1903)

Species
- Riedeliella graciliflora Harms; Riedeliella magalhaesii (Rizzini) M.P. Lima & Vaz; Riedeliella sessiliflora Kuhlm.

Synonyms
- Itaobimia Rizzini (1977); Sweetiopsis Chodat & Hassk. (1904)

Genus of legumes

Riedeliella is a genus of flowering plants in the legume family, Fabaceae. It includes three species of scandent shrubs native to Paraguay and eastern and west-central Brazil. They grow in seasonally-dry tropical forest, cerrado (savanna and open woodland), and caatinga (thorn shrubland). The genus belongs to the subfamily Faboideae, and was recently assigned to the informal monophyletic Pterocarpus clade within the Dalbergieae.
