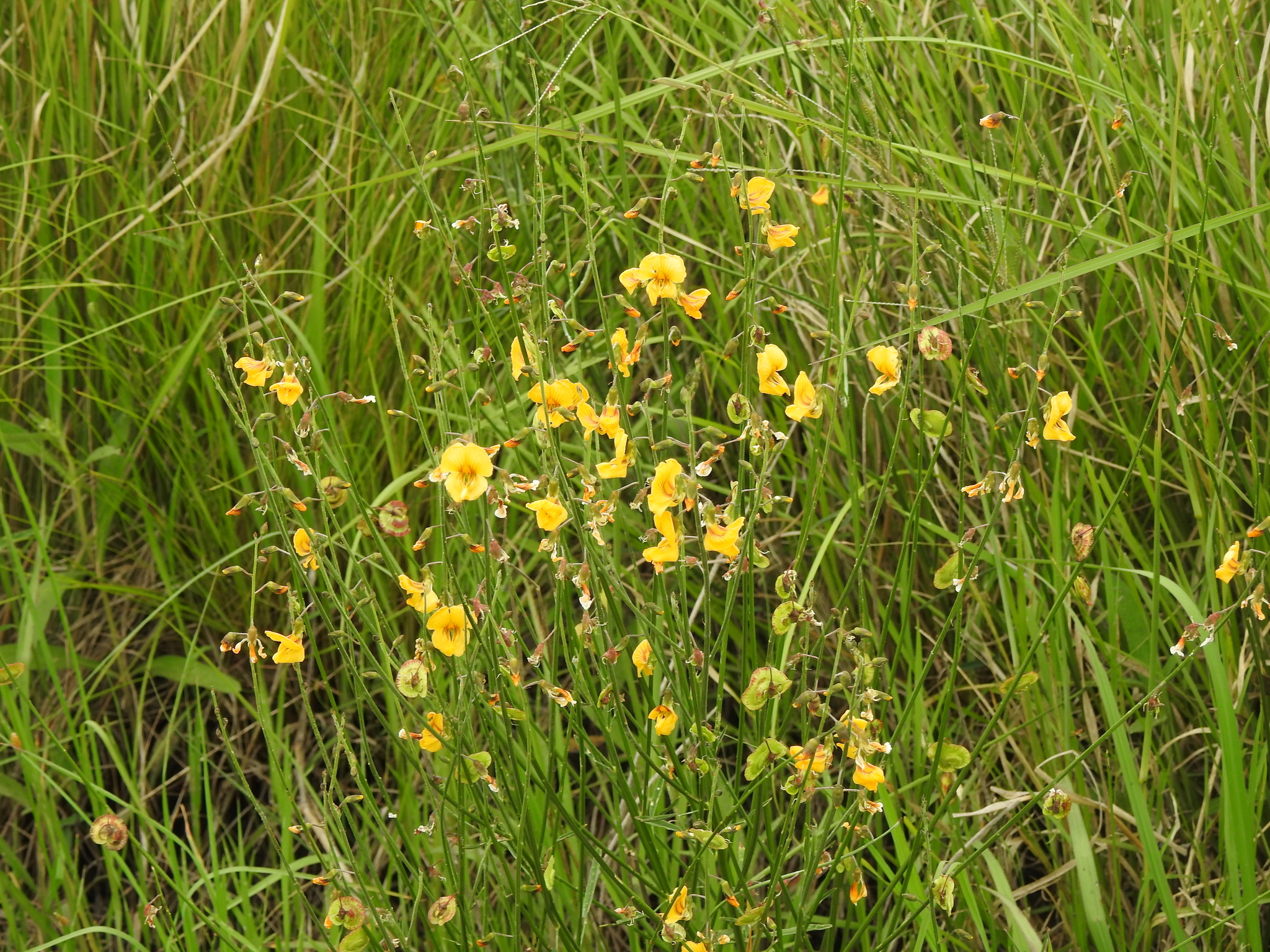

Scientific classification
- Kingdom: Plantae
- Clade: Tracheophytes
- Clade: Angiosperms
- Clade: Eudicots
- Clade: Rosids
- Order: Fabales
- Family: Fabaceae
- Subfamily: Faboideae
- Genus: Discolobium
- Species: D. junceum

Binomial name
- Discolobium junceum M.Micheli

Synonyms
- Discolobium leptophyllum var. junceum (M.Micheli) Hassl.

= Discolobium junceum =

Species of flowering plant

Discolobium junceum is a species of flowering plant in the family Fabaceae. It is native to South America and can be natively found in Northeast Argentina and Paraguay.

== Taxonomy ==
The species was first described by Marc Micheli in 1889 under its current binomial name.

=== Etymology ===
The Latin specific epithet junceum means "rush-like", which refers to the stems bearing a resemblance to the characteristic cylindrical and jointless stems of Rush (Juncus) species.
