= Steinbachiella =

Conservation status
- Vulnerable (IUCN 3.1)

Scientific classification
- Kingdom: Plantae
- Clade: Tracheophytes
- Clade: Angiosperms
- Clade: Eudicots
- Clade: Rosids
- Order: Fabales
- Family: Fabaceae
- Subfamily: Faboideae
- Tribe: Dalbergieae
- Genus: Steinbachiella; Harms
- Species: S. leptoclada

Binomial name
- Steinbachiella leptoclada Harms (1928)

Synonyms
- Diphysa leptoclada (Harms) Polhill & Sousa; Machaerium saraense Rudd (1972)

Genus of legumes

Steinbachiella leptoclada is recently reinstated species of flowering plant in the legume family, Fabaceae. It is a tree endemic to Bolivia. It is the only member of the monotypic genus Steinbachiella. The genus is assigned to the informal monophyletic Dalbergia clade of the Dalbergieae.
