= Pictetia mucronata =

Scientific classification
- Kingdom: Plantae
- Clade: Tracheophytes
- Clade: Angiosperms
- Clade: Eudicots
- Clade: Rosids
- Order: Fabales
- Family: Fabaceae
- Subfamily: Faboideae
- Genus: Pictetia
- Species: P. mucronata

Binomial name
- Pictetia mucronata (Griseb.) Beyra & Lavin

Synonyms
- Belairia mucronata Griseb.; Belairia parvifoliola Britton; Belairia savannarum Bisse

Species of legume

Pictetia mucronata is a species of flowering plant in the family Fabaceae. It is found only in Cuba.
