= Discolobium paucijugum =

Scientific classification
- Kingdom: Plantae
- Clade: Tracheophytes
- Clade: Angiosperms
- Clade: Eudicots
- Clade: Rosids
- Order: Fabales
- Family: Fabaceae
- Subfamily: Faboideae
- Genus: Discolobium
- Species: D. paucijugum

Binomial name
- Discolobium paucijugum Harms ex Kuntze

Species of flowering plant

Discolobium paucijugum is a species of shrubby flowering plant in the family Fabaceae. Its native range extends from Northeast Argentina to Paraguay.
