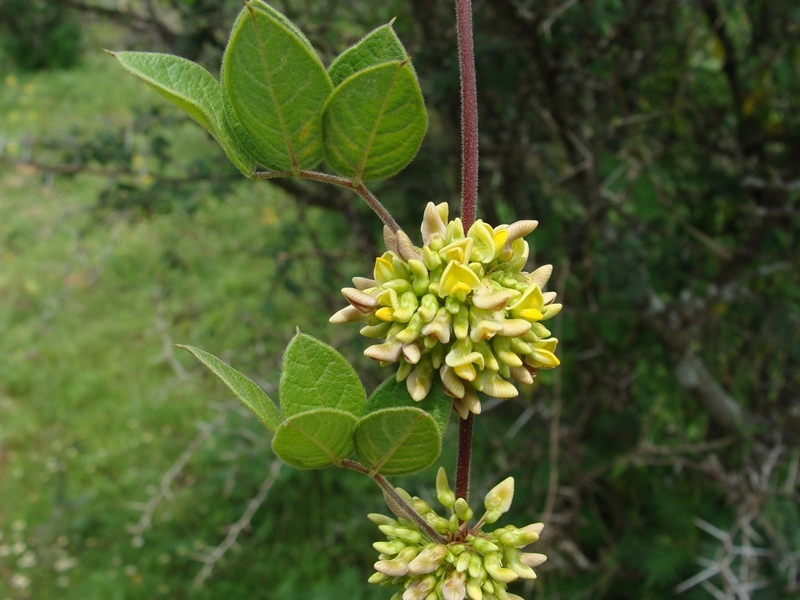
- Nissolia microptera

Scientific classification
- Kingdom: Plantae
- Clade: Tracheophytes
- Clade: Angiosperms
- Clade: Eudicots
- Clade: Rosids
- Order: Fabales
- Family: Fabaceae
- Subfamily: Faboideae
- Tribe: Dalbergieae
- Genus: Nissolia; Jacq. (1760), nom. cons.

Type species
- Nissolia fruticosa Jacq.

Species
- 32; see text

Synonyms
- Boenninghausia Spreng. (1826); Chaetocalyx DC. (1826); Isodesmia Gardner (1843); Planarium Desv. (1826); Pseudomachaerium Hassl. (1907); Raimondianthus Harms (1928); Rhadinocarpus Vogel (1838)

= Nissolia =

Genus of legumes

Nissolia, the yellowhoods, is a genus of lianas in the legume family, Fabaceae. It includes 32 species native to the tropical and subtropical Americas, ranging from Arizona and Texas through Mexico, Central America, and South America to northern Argentina. It belongs to the subfamily Faboideae, and was recently assigned to the informal monophyletic Adesmia clade of the Dalbergieae.

32 species are accepted:

- Nissolia acutifolia (Vogel) T.M.Moura & Fort.-Perez
- Nissolia blanchetiana (Benth.) T.M.Moura & Fort.-Perez
- Nissolia bracteosa (Rudd) T.M.Moura & Fort.-Perez
- Nissolia brasiliensis (Vogel) T.M.Moura & Fort.-Perez
- Nissolia chacoensis (Vanni) T.M.Moura & Fort.-Perez
- Nissolia chiapensis Rudd
- Nissolia fruticosa Jacq.
- Nissolia gentryi Rudd
- Nissolia hintonii Sandwith
- Nissolia klugii (Rudd) T.M.Moura & Fort.-Perez
- Nissolia latisiliqua (Poir.) T.M.Moura & Fort.-Perez
- Nissolia laxior (B.L.Rob.) Rose
- Nissolia leiogyne Sandwith
- Nissolia longiflora (Benth. ex A.Gray) T.M.Moura & Fort.-Perez
- Nissolia longiloba (Rudd) T.M.Moura & Fort.-Perez
- Nissolia microptera Poir.
- Nissolia montana Rose
- Nissolia nigricans (Burkart) T.M.Moura & Fort.-Perez
- Nissolia peruviana T.M.Moura & Fort.-Perez
- Nissolia platycalyx S.Watson
- Nissolia platycarpa Benth.
- Nissolia pringlei Rose
- Nissolia rondonensis Fort.-Perez & G.P.Lewis
- Nissolia ruddiae Cruz Durán & M.Sousa
- Nissolia schottii A.Gray
- Nissolia setosa Brandegee
- Nissolia stipulata I.Castro & Fort.-Perez
- Nissolia subulata (Mackinder) I.Castro, Fort.-Perez & G.P.Lewis
- Nissolia tomentosa (Gardner) T.M.Moura & Fort.-Perez
- Nissolia vincentina (Ker Gawl.) T.M.Moura & Fort.-Perez
- Nissolia weberbaueri (Harms) T.M.Moura & Fort.-Perez
- Nissolia wislizeni (A.Gray) A.Gray
