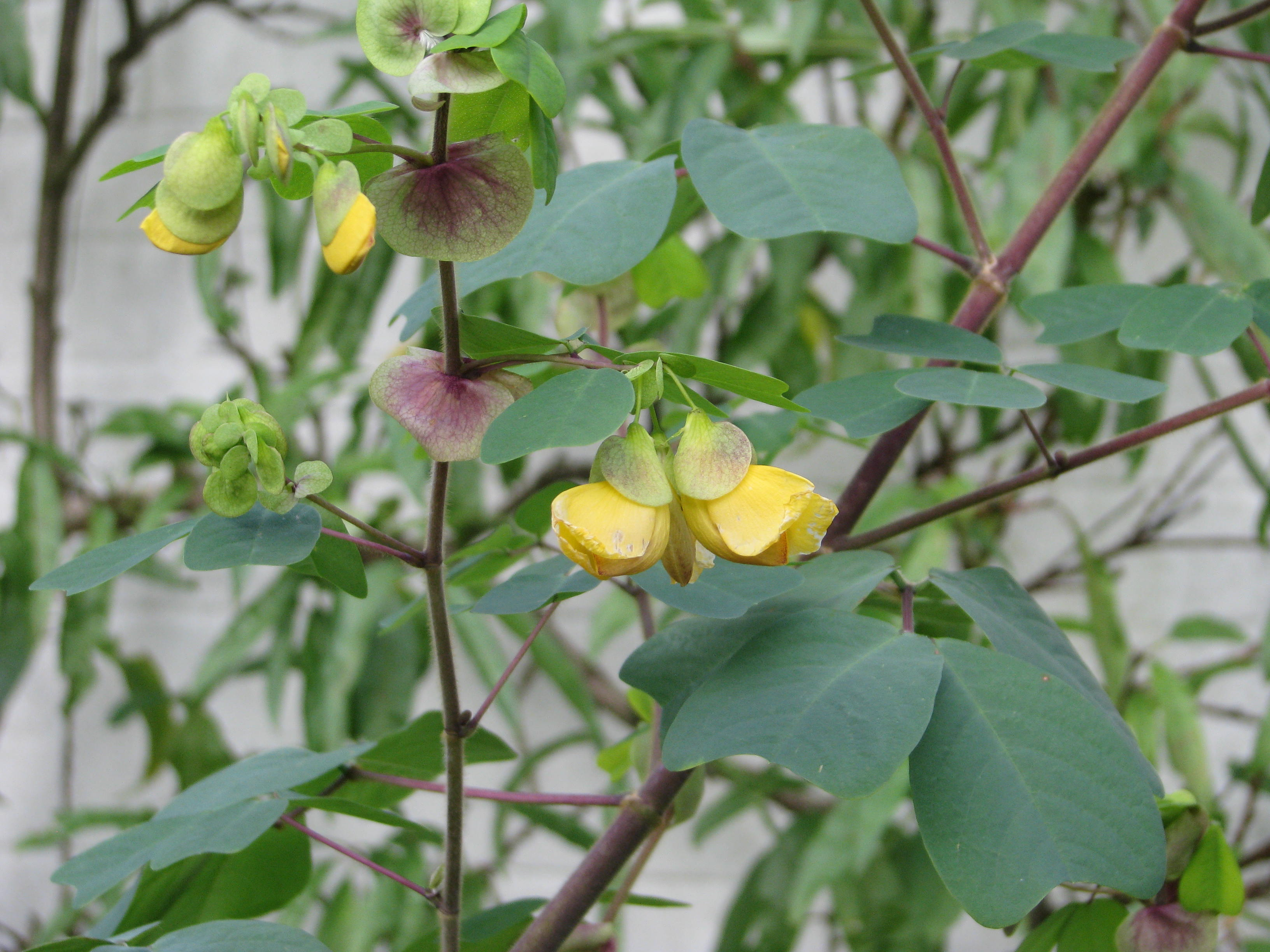
- In cultivation

Scientific classification
- Kingdom: Plantae
- Clade: Tracheophytes
- Clade: Angiosperms
- Clade: Eudicots
- Clade: Rosids
- Order: Fabales
- Family: Fabaceae
- Subfamily: Faboideae
- Genus: Amicia
- Species: A. zygomeris

Binomial name
- Amicia zygomeris DC.

= Amicia zygomeris =

Species of legume

Amicia zygomeris, the yoke-leaved amicia, is a woody plant in the legume family Fabaceae, native to Mexico. Grown as an ornamental plant, it is said to be hardy down to −10 °C (14 °F)

== Etymology ==
Amicia was named for Jean Baptiste Amici (1786-1863), an Italian physicist. Zygomeris is derived from Greek, meaning 'with twinned parts’.

== Description ==
Amicia zygomeris is a vigorous, erect, medium-sized shrub. Its stems, which are usually herbaceous, are hollow, downy and greenish. It has pinnate leaves that arise from leafy, inflated, purplish stipules. The leaves have four leaflets, which are obovate and notched. The flowers are borne in autumn, in short racemes arising from the axils; they are yellow with purple flecks.
