= Soemmeringia =

Scientific classification
- Kingdom: Plantae
- Clade: Tracheophytes
- Clade: Angiosperms
- Clade: Eudicots
- Clade: Rosids
- Order: Fabales
- Family: Fabaceae
- Subfamily: Faboideae
- Tribe: Dalbergieae
- Genus: Soemmeringia; Mart. (1828)
- Species: S. semperflorens

Binomial name
- Soemmeringia semperflorens Mart. (1828)

Genus of legumes

Soemmeringia semperflorens is a species of flowering plants in the legume family, Fabaceae. It is the only member of the genus Soemmeringia.

It is a prostrate shrub or perennial herb native to northern South America, ranging from Colombia, Venezuela, and Guyana through northern, northeastern, and west-central Brazil to Bolivia. It grows in seasonally-dry tropical forest, cerrado (wooded grassland and woodland), and scrub in the Amazon Basin and northeastern Brazil, often along rivers, in floodplains, and in disturbed areas.

It belongs to the subfamily Faboideae, and was recently assigned to the informal monophyletic Dalbergia clade of the Dalbergieae.
