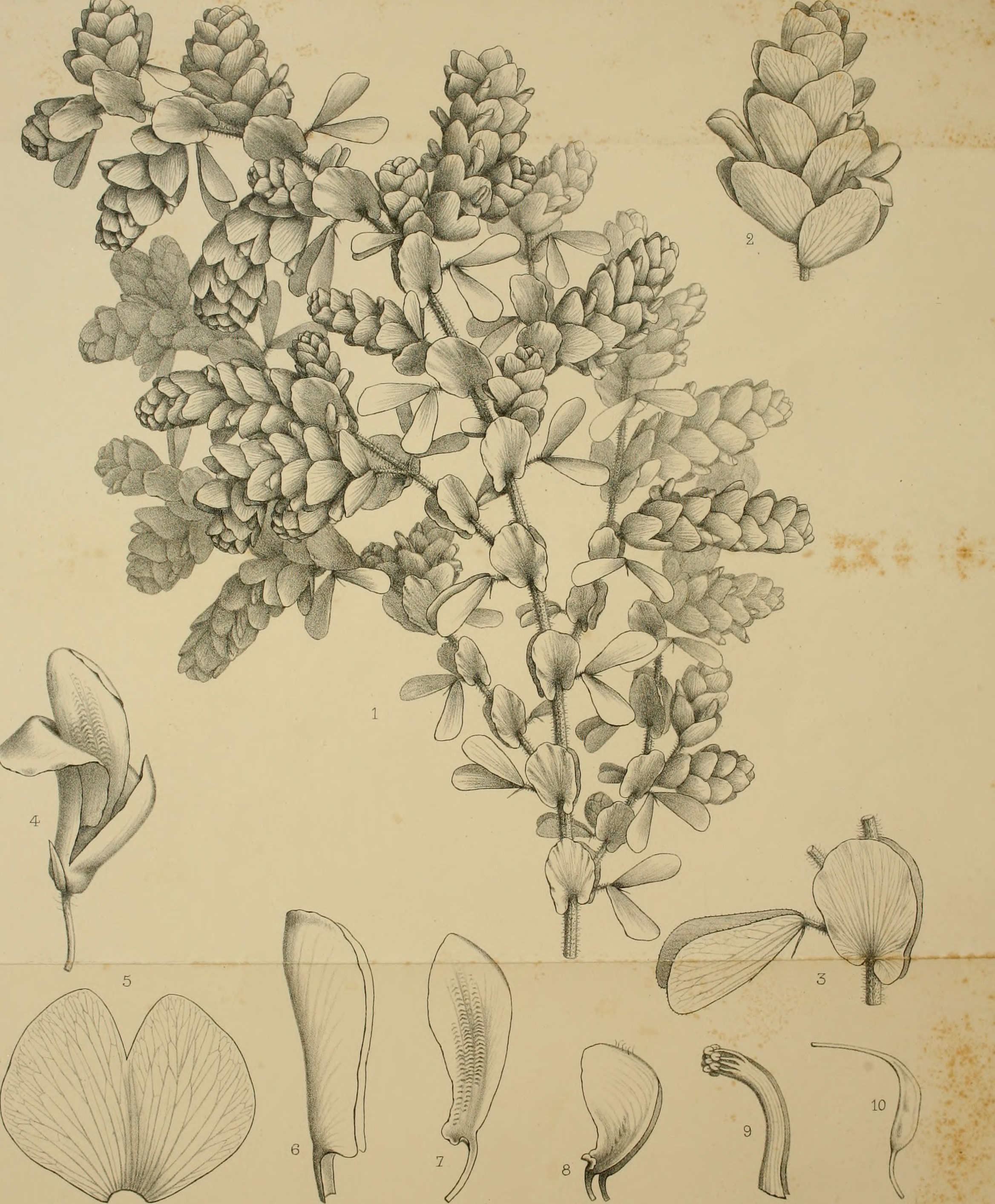
- Humularia bifoliolata

Scientific classification
- Kingdom: Plantae
- Clade: Tracheophytes
- Clade: Angiosperms
- Clade: Eudicots
- Clade: Rosids
- Order: Fabales
- Family: Fabaceae
- Subfamily: Faboideae
- Tribe: Dalbergieae
- Genus: Humularia; P.A.Duvign. (1954)

Species
- 34; see text

= Humularia =

Genus of legumes

Humularia is a genus of flowering plants in the legume family, Fabaceae. It includes 34 species native to sub-Saharan Africa, ranging from South Sudan to Cameroon, Angola, Malawi, and Tanzania. Species include herbs with woody bases and occasionally small shrubs. Typical habitats include seasonally-dry tropical woodland, wooded grassland, scrub, and grassland, often along stream banks, swamp margins, floodplains, and sandy areas, and sometimes in montane areas. The genus belongs to the subfamily Faboideae, and was recently assigned to the informal monophyletic Dalbergia clade of the Dalbergieae.

== Species ==
Humularia comprises the following species:

- Humularia affinis (De Wild.) P.A.Duvign.
- Humularia anceps P.A.Duvign.
- Humularia apiculata (De Wild.) P.A.Duvign.
- Humularia bequaertii (De Wild.) P.A.Duvign.
- Humularia bianoensis P.A.Duvign.
- Humularia bifoliolata (Micheli) P.A.Duvign.
- Humularia callensii P.A.Duvign.
- Humularia chevalieri (De Wild.) P.A.Duvign.
- Humularia ciliato-denticulata (De Wild.) P.A.Duvign.
- Humularia corbisieri (De Wild.) P.A.Duvign.
- Humularia descampsii (De Wild. & T.Durand) P.A.Duvign.
- Humularia drepanocephala (Baker) P.A.Duvign.
- Humularia duvigneaudii Symoens
- Humularia elegantula P.A.Duvign.
- Humularia elisabethvilleana (De Wild.) P.A.Duvign.
- Humularia kapiriensis (De Wild.) P.A.Duvign.
- Humularia kassneri (De Wild.) P.A.Duvign.
- Humularia katangensis (De Wild.) P.A.Duvign.
- Humularia ledermannii (De Wild.) P.A.Duvign.
- Humularia magnistipulata Torre
- Humularia mendoncae (Baker) P.A.Duvign.
- Humularia meyeri-johannis (Harms & De Wild.) P.A.Duvign.
- Humularia minima (Hutch.) P.A.Duvign.
- Humularia multifoliolata Verdc.
- Humularia pseudaeschynomene Verdc.
- Humularia reekmansii Bamps
- Humularia renieri (De Wild.) P.A.Duvign.
- Humularia rosea (De Wild.) P.A.Duvign.
- Humularia submarginalis Verdc.
- Humularia sudanica P.A.Duvign.
- Humularia tenuis P.A.Duvign.
- Humularia upembae P.A.Duvign.
- Humularia welwitschii (Taub.) P.A.Duvign.
- Humularia wittei P.A.Duvign.
