= Weberbauerella =

Scientific classification
- Kingdom: Plantae
- Clade: Tracheophytes
- Clade: Angiosperms
- Clade: Eudicots
- Clade: Rosids
- Order: Fabales
- Family: Fabaceae
- Subfamily: Faboideae
- Clade: Dalbergioids
- Tribe: Dalbergieae
- Genus: Weberbauerella; Ulbr. (1906)

Species
- 3; see text

Genus of legumes

Weberbauerella is a South American genus of flowering plants in the legume family, Fabaceae. It includes three species of perennial herbs or subshrubs native to coastal Peru and northern Chile. They grow in seasonally-dry tropical coastal forest, on sand or sandy hills. It was recently assigned to the informal monophyletic Dalbergia clade of the Dalbergieae.

Illustrations

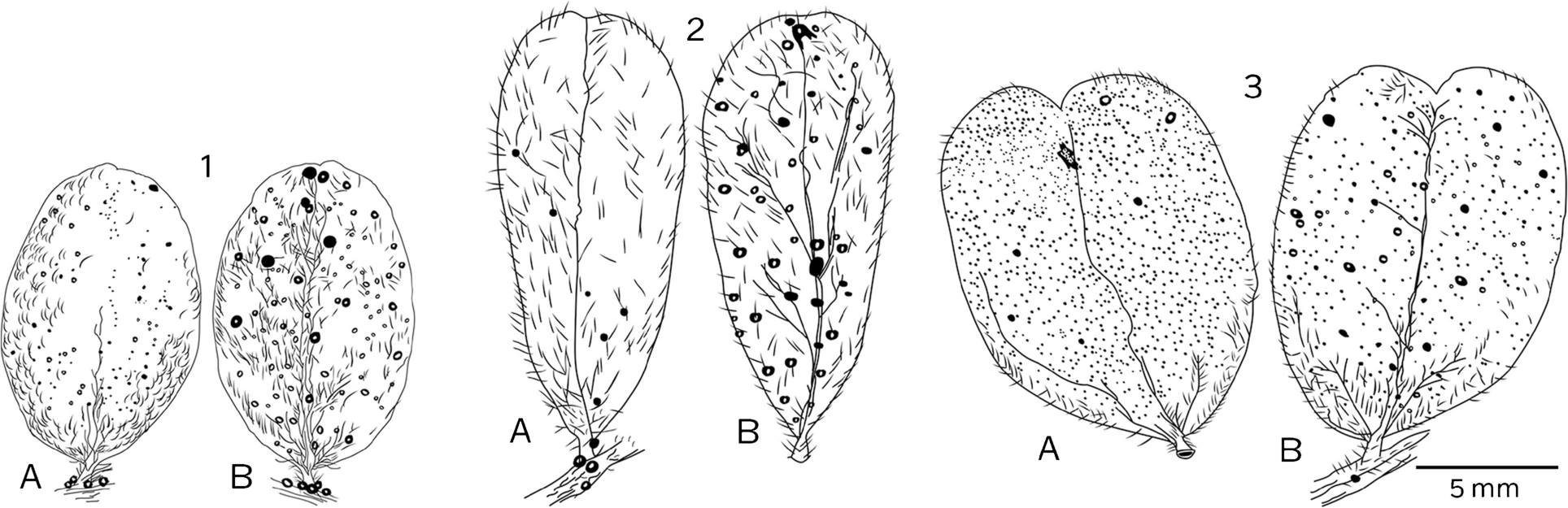
Leaflets. Left to right: W. raimondiana, W. chilensis, W. brongniartioides

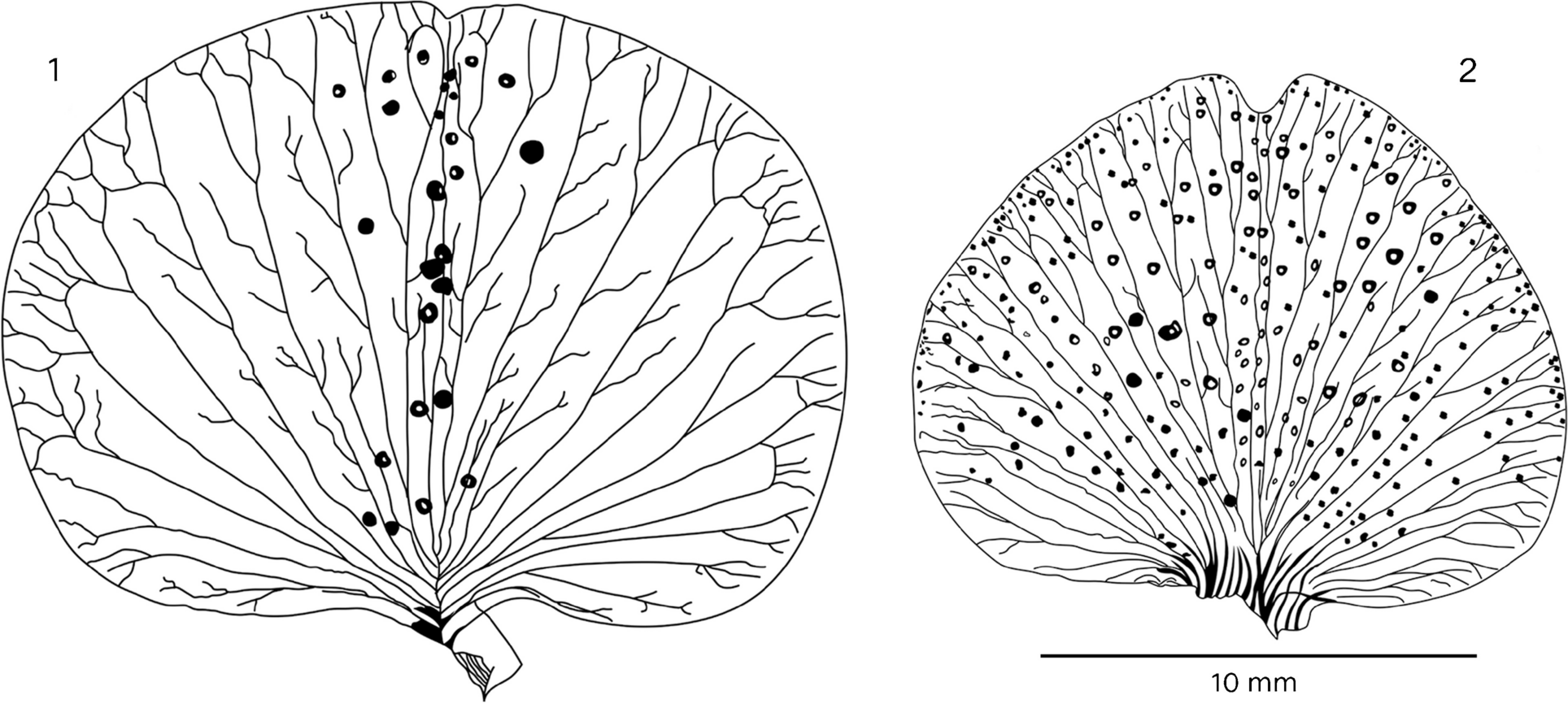
Petals. Left to right: W. raimondiana, W. brongniartioides

== Species ==
Species accepted by Plants of the World Online as of September 2023:

- Weberbauerella brongniartioides Ulbr.
- Weberbauerella chilensis Faúndez & Saldivia
- Weberbauerella raimondiana Ferreyra
