= Ramorinoa =

Scientific classification
- Kingdom: Plantae
- Clade: Tracheophytes
- Clade: Angiosperms
- Clade: Eudicots
- Clade: Rosids
- Order: Fabales
- Family: Fabaceae
- Subfamily: Faboideae
- Tribe: Dalbergieae
- Genus: Ramorinoa; Speg. (1924)
- Species: R. girolae

Binomial name
- Ramorinoa girolae Speg. (1924)

Genus of legumes

Ramorinoa girolae is a species of flowering plant in the legume family, Fabaceae. It is the sole species in genus Ramorinoa. It is a xerophytic tree or shrub native to La Rioja, San Juan, and San Luis Provinces of western Argentina. Unlike most legumes, Ramorinoa girolae does not produce any leaves. It grows in subtropical lowland and lower montane dry forest or shrubland in rocky and sandy areas. It is locally known as chica, and stands of R. girolae are known as chicales. It belongs to the subfamily Faboideae, and was recently assigned to the informal monophyletic Pterocarpus clade within the Dalbergieae. It is the only member of the genus Ramorinoa.
