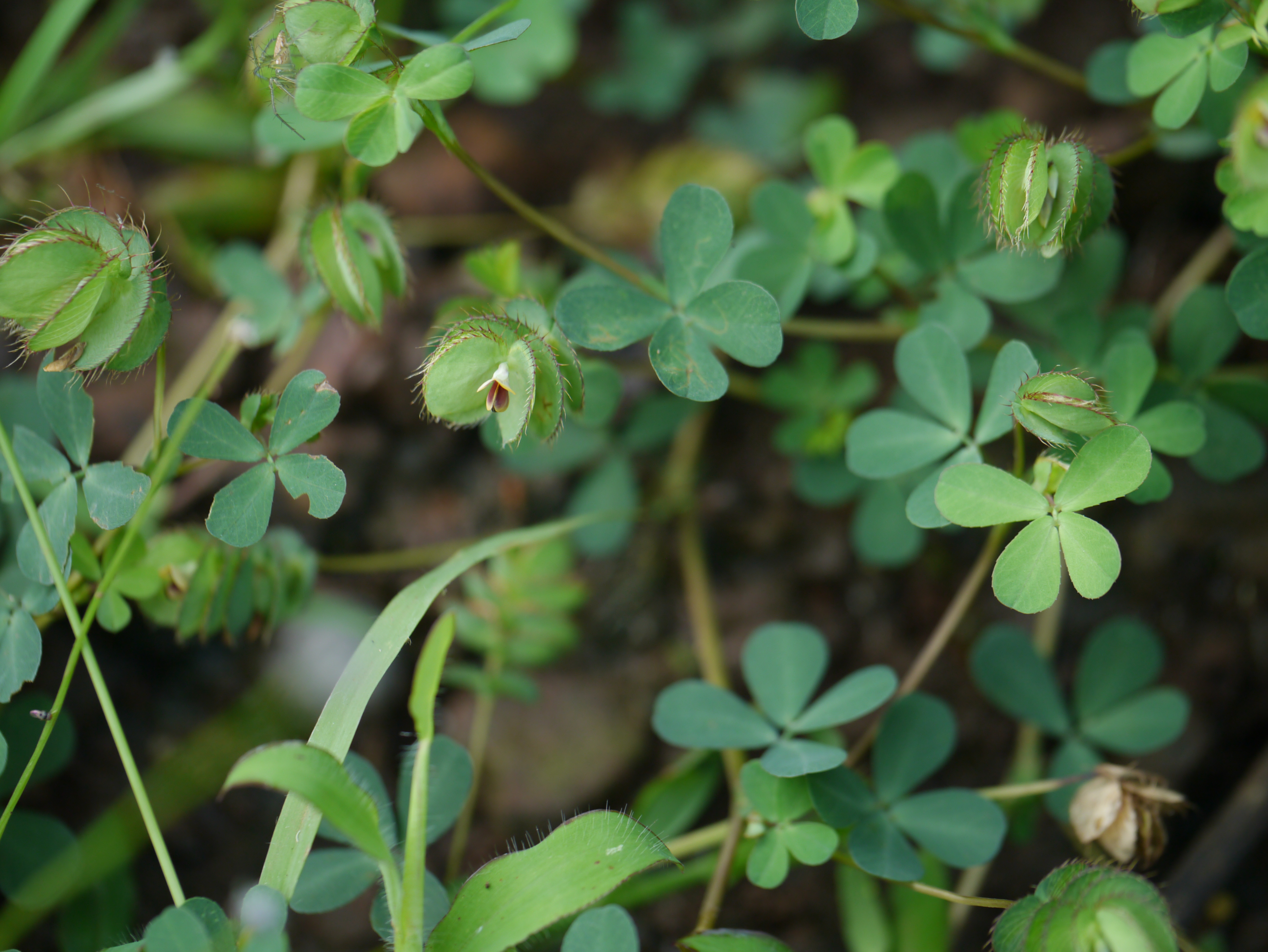
- Geissaspis cristata

Scientific classification
- Kingdom: Plantae
- Clade: Tracheophytes
- Clade: Angiosperms
- Clade: Eudicots
- Clade: Rosids
- Order: Fabales
- Family: Fabaceae
- Subfamily: Faboideae
- Genus: Geissaspis; Wight & Arn. (1834)
- Species: G. cristata

Binomial name
- Geissaspis cristata Wight & Arn. (1834)

= Geissaspis =

Genus of legumes

Geissaspis is a genus of flowering plants in the family Fabaceae. It contains one accepted species, Geissaspis cristata. It is a scrambling annual or perennial that ranges from the Indian Subcontinent through Indochina to southern China and Peninsular Malaysia. It has three varieties:

- Geissaspis cristata var. cristata
- Geissaspis cristata var. malabarica (Sivar. & A.Babu) M.R.Almeida
- Geissaspis cristata var. tenella (Benth.) M.R.Almeida

Geissaspis belongs to subfamily Faboideae and was recently assigned to the informal monophyletic Dalbergia clade of the Dalbergieae. Geissaspis keilii De Wild. is an unplaced name.
