= Discolobium leptophyllum =

Scientific classification
- Kingdom: Plantae
- Clade: Tracheophytes
- Clade: Angiosperms
- Clade: Eudicots
- Clade: Rosids
- Order: Fabales
- Family: Fabaceae
- Subfamily: Faboideae
- Genus: Discolobium
- Species: D. leptophyllum

Binomial name
- Discolobium leptophyllum Benth.

Species of flowering plant

Discolobium leptophyllum is a species of flowering plant in the family Fabaceae. It is native to two countries, Brazil (North Brazil and West-Central Brazil) and Bolivia.
