= Nissolia vincentina =

- Nissolia vincentina flowers from the front

Scientific classification
- Kingdom: Plantae
- Clade: Tracheophytes
- Clade: Angiosperms
- Clade: Eudicots
- Clade: Rosids
- Order: Fabales
- Family: Fabaceae
- Subfamily: Faboideae
- Genus: Nissolia
- Species: N. vincentina

Binomial name
- Nissolia vincentina (Ker Gawl.) T.M.Moura & Fort.-Perez

Synonyms
- List: Boenninghausia vincentina (Ker Gawl.) Spreng.; Chaetocalyx vincentinus (Ker Gawl.) DC.; Glycine vincentina Ker Gawl.; Chaetocalyx fissus Pittier; Chaetocalyx magniflorus Pittier; Chaetocalyx nigrescens Pittier; Chaetocalyx parviflorus Benth.; Chaetocalyx paucifolius Pittier; Chaetocalyx perglandulosus Pittier; Chaetocalyx pubescens DC.; Chaetocalyx retusus S.F.Blake; Chaetocalyx scandens (L.) Urb.; Chaetocalyx scandens var. fissus (Pittier) D.Velázquez; Chaetocalyx scandens var. pubescens (DC.) Rudd; Chaetocalyx tenuipedicellatus Pittier; Chaetocalyx vestitus Standl.; Coronilla scandens L.; Glycine pubescens Bertero ex DC.; Rhadinocarpus multiflorus Vogel

Species of plant

Flower from side

Leaf with 5 leaflets

Vine in habitat twining on a bush

Nissolia vincentina has no English name, though all Nissolia species can be called yellowhoods. It is a vine native to Tropical America. It belongs to the family Fabaceae.

== Description ==
Nissolia vincentina displays these key features distinguishing it from similar species:

- The vine's physical features vary greatly. The climbing, twining or prostrate stems can be densely hairy to hairless, often with some hairs bearing glands.
- Leaves are pinnately divided into 5 leaflets, each up to 50 mm (2 in) long and about half as wide.
- Solitary or few flowers on pedicels up to 30 mm (1 3/16 in) long arise where leaves are attached to the stem. Flowers with yellow petals are up to 22 mm (7/8 in) long. Calyces are somewhat bell-shaped, up to 10 mm (3/8 in) long, hairy or not, and sometimes bearing glandular hairs. Calyx teeth 2–7 mm (3/32–9/32 in) vary in shape, sometimes having narrow, slender tips tapering to a fine point, and other times being thicker with no such slender tip.
- The loment-type fruits are nearly round in cross section, composed of 7-12 segments. Seeds are dark reddish brown, about 5.5 mm × 1 mm (3/16 in × 1/16 in) in size.

== Distribution ==
Nissolia vincentina inhabits disjunct populations, occurring in the tropical parts of southern Mexico, including the Yucatan Peninsula, in the Caribbean in the Dominican Republic, in Central America in Honduras, Nicaragua and Costa Rica, and in South America in Colombia, Venezuela and Brazil.

== Habitat ==
In Brazil's northeastern state of Pernambuco, Nissolia vincentina occurs in rocky areas, in Cerrados, in areas disturbed by humans, in gallery forests, tropical rainforests and restingas. Images on this page show a vine photographed in secondary growth of a Yucatán dry forest on limestone at an elevation of about 40 m (130 ft) above sea level.

== Human interactions ==
In Mexico's Yucatan Peninsula, Nissolia vincentina is recognized as contributing as livestock forage, as being medicinal, and as of value in beekeeping. Also in the Yucatan Peninsula, it is a weed in cornfields.

== Taxonomy ==
In 1824 when John Bellenden Ker, known botanically as "Ker Gawl." formally described Nissolia vincentina using the basionym Glycine vincentina, he noted that the taxon was "Native of the Island of St. Vincent's; from whence it was introduced into the garden of Comtesse de Vandes, at Bayswater." He also remarked that the species probably should form the basis of a new genus, which later happened.

=== Phylogeny ===
A study of pollen morphology and ultrastructure of 21 Nissolia species found Nissolia vincentina to be sister to a clade comprising Nissolia nigricans, Nissolia bracteosa and Nissolia longiflora.

=== Etymology ===
The genus name Nissolia honors the French botanist (1647–1735) Guillaume Nissole.

The species name vincentina references the Caribbean volcanic island Saint Vincent, which John Bellenden Ker noted as the home of the plant from which he described the species when he formally named it in 1824.
