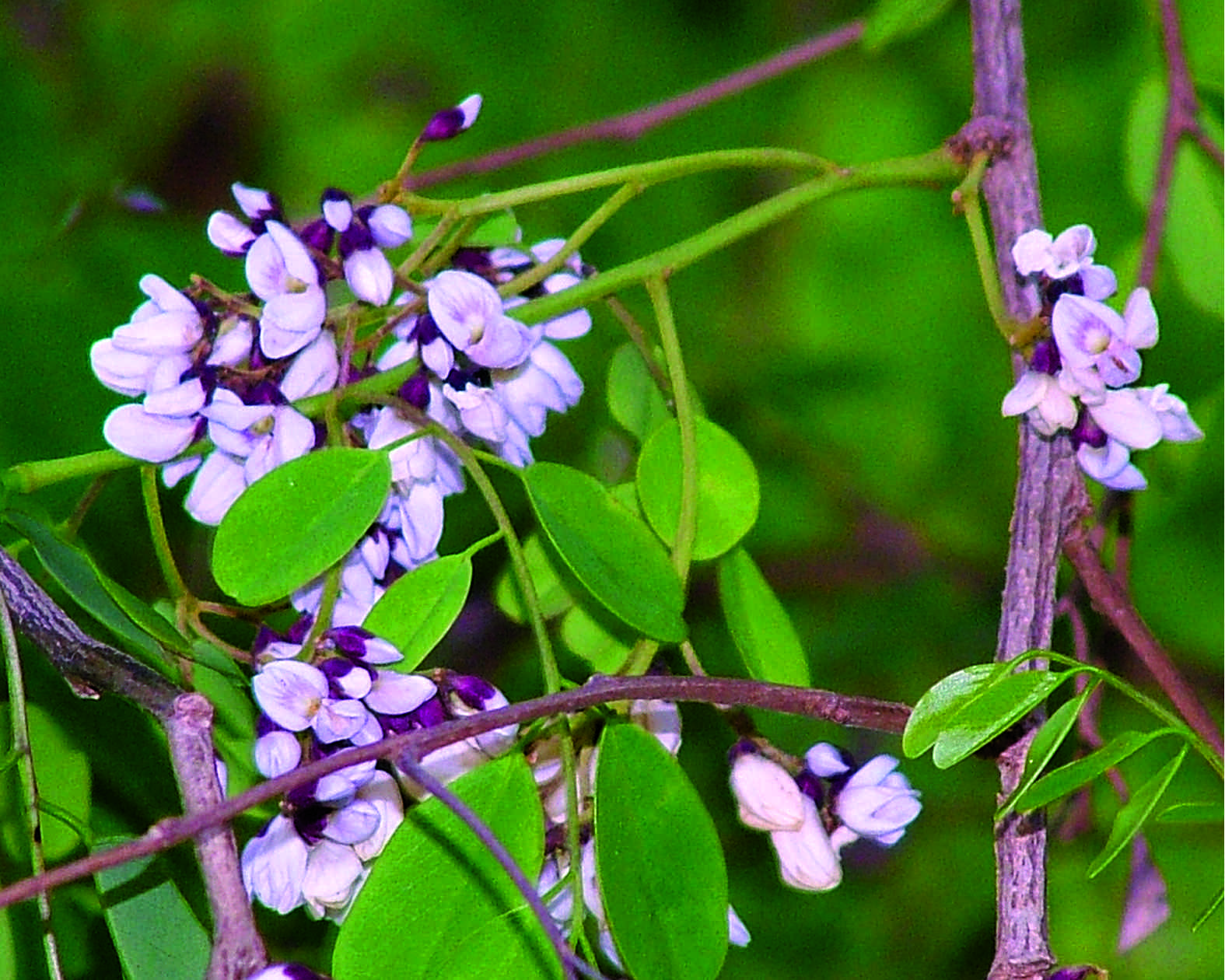
- Dalbergia lanceolaria

Scientific classification
- Kingdom: Plantae
- Clade: Tracheophytes
- Clade: Angiosperms
- Clade: Eudicots
- Clade: Rosids
- Order: Fabales
- Family: Fabaceae
- Subfamily: Faboideae
- Clade: Meso-Papilionoideae
- Clade: Dalbergioids
- Tribe: Dalbergieae (DC.) Cardoso et al. 2013

Type genus
- Dalbergia L. f.

Subclades and genera
- See text

Synonyms
- Adesmieae (Benth.) Hutch. 1964; Aeschynomeneae (Benth.) Hutch. 1964; Coronilleae subtribe Aeschynomeninae (Benth.) Schulze-Menz 1964; Coronilleae subtribe Patagoniinae (Taub.) Schulze-Menz 1964; Dalbergioid clade sensu Lavin et al. 2001; Dalbergioids sensu stricto; Desmodieae subtribe Bryinae B.G.Schub. 1964; Hedysareae subtribe Adesmiinae Benth. 1865; Hedysareae subtribe Aeschynomeninae Benth. 1865; Hedysareae subtribe Patagoniinae Taub. 1894; Poiretieae Ohashi

= Dalbergieae =

Tribe of legumes

The tribe Dalbergieae is an early-branching clade within the flowering plant subfamily Faboideae (or Papilionaceae). Within that subfamily, it belongs to an unranked clade called the dalbergioids. It was recently revised to include many genera formerly placed in tribes Adesmieae and Aeschynomeneae and to be included in a monophyletic group informally known as the dalbergioids sensu lato. The members of this tribe have a distinctive root nodule morphology, often referred to as an "aeschynomenoid" or "dalbergioid" nodule.

== Subclades and genera ==
=== Adesmia clade ===
- Adesmia DC.
- Amicia Kunth
- Chaetocalyx DC.
- Nissolia Jacq.
- Poiretia Vent.
- Zornia J. F. Gmel.

=== Dalbergia clade ===
- Aeschynomene L.
- Bryaspis P. A. Duvign.
- Cyclocarpa Afzel. ex Urb.
- Dalbergia L. f.
- Diphysa Jacq.
- Geissaspis Wight & Arn.
- Humularia P. A. Duvign.
- Kotschya Endl.
- Machaerium Pers.
- Ormocarpopsis R. Vig.
- Ormocarpum P. Beauv.
- Pictetia DC.
- Smithia Aiton
- Soemmeringia Mart.
- Steinbachiella Harms.
- Weberbauerella Ulbr.
- Zygocarpum Thulin & Lavin

=== Pterocarpus clade ===
- Acosmium Schott
- Arachis L.
- Brya P. Browne
- Cascaronia Griseb.
- Centrolobium Mart. ex Benth.
- Chapmannia Torr. & A. Gray
- Cranocarpus Benth.
- Discolobium Benth.
- Etaballia Benth.
- Fiebrigiella Harms
- Fissicalyx Benth.
- Geoffroea Jacq.
- Grazielodendron H. C. Lima
- Inocarpus J. R. Forst. & G. Forst.
- Maraniona C.E.Hughes, G.P.Lewis, Daza, & Reynel
- Paramachaerium Ducke
- Platymiscium Vogel
- Platypodium Vogel
- Pterocarpus Jacq.
- Ramorinoa Speg.
- Riedeliella Harms
- Stylosanthes Sw.
- Tipuana (Benth.) Benth.
