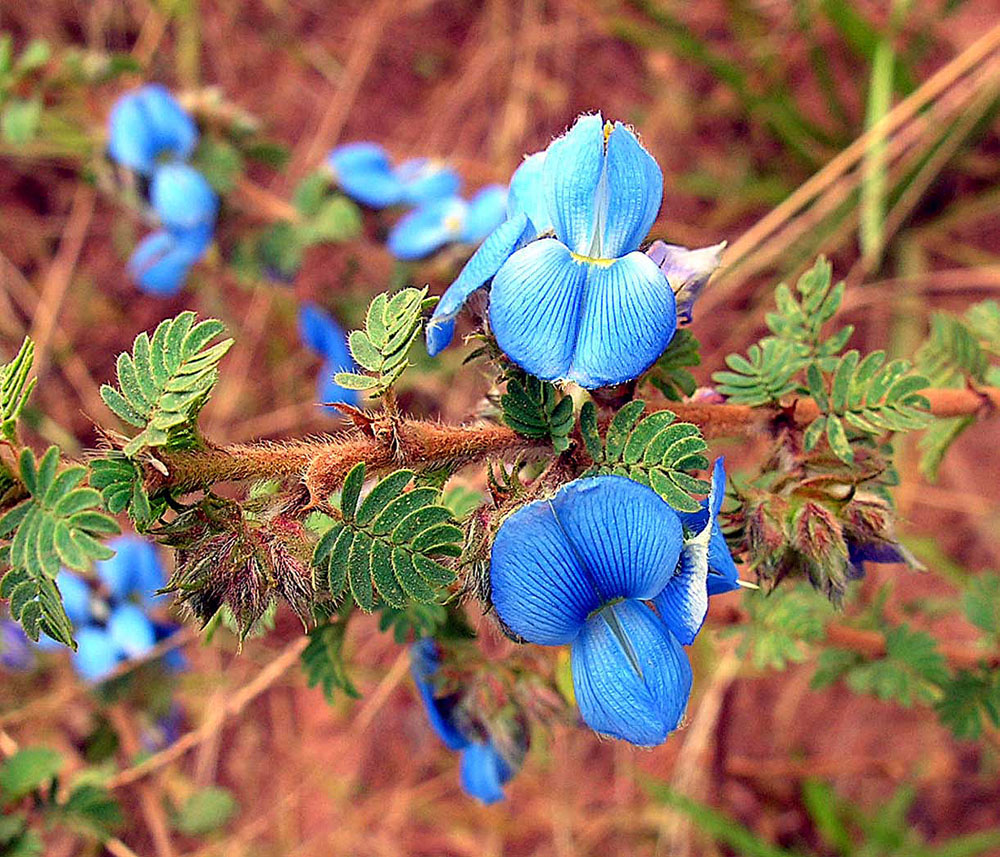
- Kotschya strigosa, native to both east and west Africa

Scientific classification
- Kingdom: Plantae
- Clade: Tracheophytes
- Clade: Angiosperms
- Clade: Eudicots
- Clade: Rosids
- Order: Fabales
- Family: Fabaceae
- Subfamily: Faboideae
- Tribe: Dalbergieae
- Genus: Kotschya; Endl. (1839)

Species
- 30; see text

Synonyms
- Sarcobotrya R.Vig. (1952)

= Kotschya =

Genus of legumes

Kotschya is a genus of legumes in the family Fabaceae. It includes 30 species native to sub-Saharan Africa. The genus was recently assigned to the informal monophyletic Dalbergia clade of the Dalbergieae. It contains the following species:

- Kotschya aeschynomenoides (Baker) Dewit & P.A.Duvign.
- Kotschya africana Endl.
- Kotschya bullockii Verdc.
- Kotschya capitulifera (Baker) Dewit & P.A.Duvign.
- Kotschya carsonii (Baker) Dewit & P.A.Duvign.
- Kotschya coalescens Dewit & P.A.Duvign.
- Kotschya eurycalyx (Harms) Dewit & P.A.Duvign.
- Kotschya goetzei (Harms) Verdc.
- Kotschya imbricata Verdc.
- Kotschya longiloba Verdc.
- Kotschya lutea (Porteres) Hepper
- Kotschya micrantha (Harms) Hepper
- Kotschya ochreata (Taub.) Dewit & P.A.Duvign.
- Kotschya oubanguiensis (Tisser.) Verdc.
- Kotschya parvifolia (Burtt Davy) Verdc.
- Kotschya perrieri (R.Vig.) Verdc.
- Kotschya platyphylla (Brenan) Verdc.
- Kotschya princeana (Harms) Verdc.
- Kotschya prittwitzii (Harms) Verdc.
- Kotschya recurvifolia (Taub.) F.White
- Kotschya scaberrima (Taub.) Wild
- Kotschya schweinfurthii (Taub.) Dewit & P.A.Duvign.
- Kotschya speciosa (Hutch.) Hepper
- Kotschya stolonifera (Brenan) Dewit & P.A.Duvign.
- Kotschya strigosa (Benth.) Dewit & P.A.Duvign.
- Kotschya strobilantha (Baker) Dewit & P.A.Duvign.
- Kotschya suberifera Verdc.
- Kotschya thymodora (Baker f.) Wild
- Kotschya uguenensis (Taub.) F.White
- Kotschya uniflora (A.Chev.) Hepper
