= Kotschya platyphylla =

Conservation status
- Vulnerable (IUCN 3.1)

Scientific classification
- Kingdom: Plantae
- Clade: Tracheophytes
- Clade: Angiosperms
- Clade: Eudicots
- Clade: Rosids
- Order: Fabales
- Family: Fabaceae
- Subfamily: Faboideae
- Genus: Kotschya
- Species: K. platyphylla

Binomial name
- Kotschya platyphylla (Brenan) Verdc.

Species of legume

Kotschya platyphylla is a species of flowering plant in the family Fabaceae. It is found only in Tanzania.
