= Ormocarpopsis tulearensis =

Conservation status
- Vulnerable (IUCN 3.1)

Scientific classification
- Kingdom: Plantae
- Clade: Tracheophytes
- Clade: Angiosperms
- Clade: Eudicots
- Clade: Rosids
- Order: Fabales
- Family: Fabaceae
- Subfamily: Faboideae
- Genus: Ormocarpopsis
- Species: O. tulearensis

Binomial name
- Ormocarpopsis tulearensis Du Puy & Labat

Species of legume

Ormocarpopsis tulearensis is a species of flowering plant in the family Fabaceae. It is found only in Madagascar.
