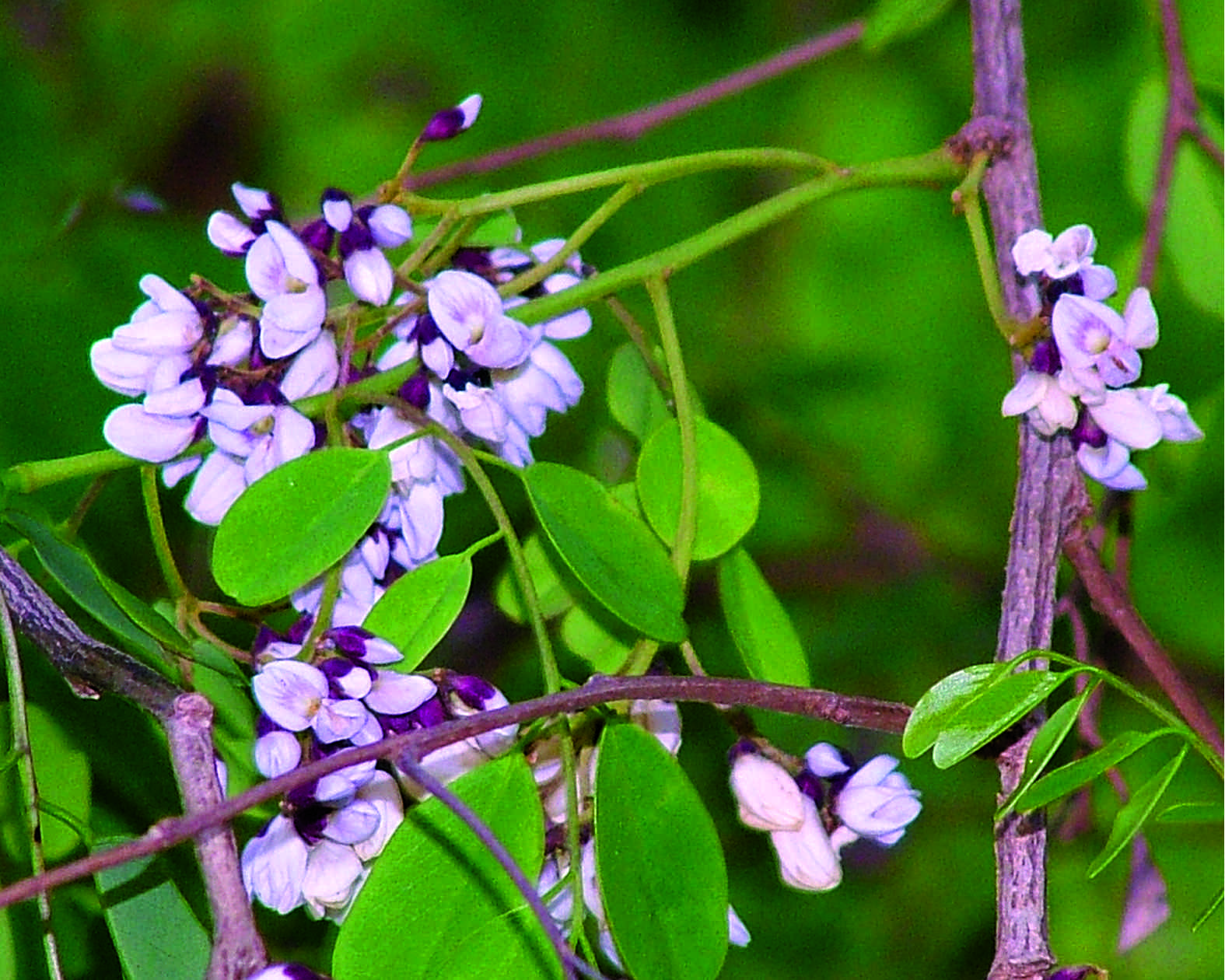

Conservation status
- Least Concern (IUCN 3.1)

Scientific classification
- Kingdom: Plantae
- Clade: Tracheophytes
- Clade: Angiosperms
- Clade: Eudicots
- Clade: Rosids
- Order: Fabales
- Family: Fabaceae
- Subfamily: Faboideae
- Genus: Dalbergia
- Species: D. lanceolaria

Binomial name
- Dalbergia lanceolaria L.f.

Synonyms
- see Subspecies

= Dalbergia lanceolaria =

Species of flowering plant

Dalbergia lanceolaria is a species of tree in the subfamily Faboideae and tribe Dalbergieae. It is a medium-sized tree growing to 20m tall and is native to: India, Sri Lanka, Nepal, Burma and Indo-China.

The bark of the tree is traditionally used as an analgesic and anti-diarrhoeal. The apiose isoflavone compound lanceolarin is found in its root bark.

Because it produces new stems (ramets), it is recommended for reforestation projects on degraded land where seeds are unlikely to grow successfully.

== Subspecies ==
Plants of the World Online includes:

- D. lanceolaria var. errans (Craib) Niyomdham - Indo-China
  - synonym: D. errans Craib
- D. lanceolaria var. lakhonensis (Gagnep.) Niyomdham & P.H.Hô - Indo-China
  - synonyms: D. lakhonensis Gagnep, D. lanceolaria var. maymyensis (Craib) Thoth, D. maymyensis Craib
- D. lanceolaria subsp. paniculata (Roxb.) Thoth. - Indian subcontinent to Indo-China
  - synonyms include: Amerimnon paniculatum (Roxb.) Kuntze, D. hemsleyi Prain, D. paniculata Roxb.

== Gallery ==
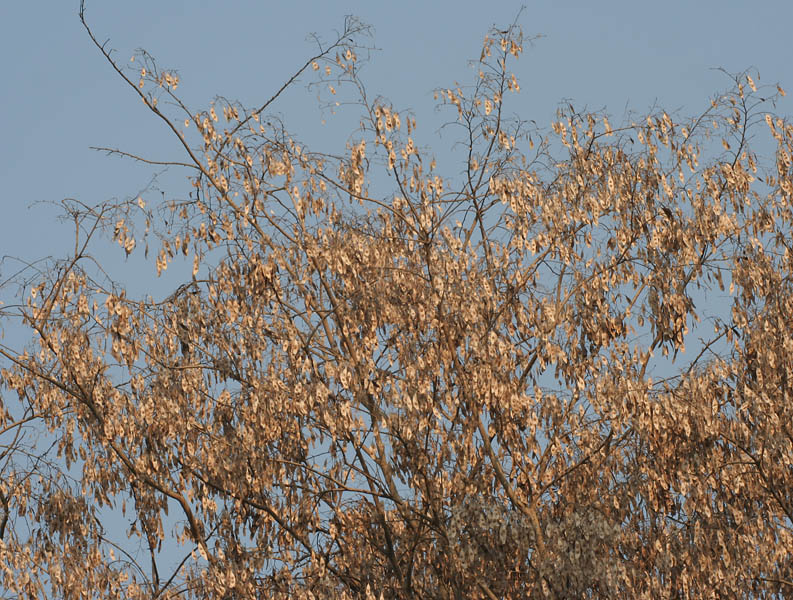

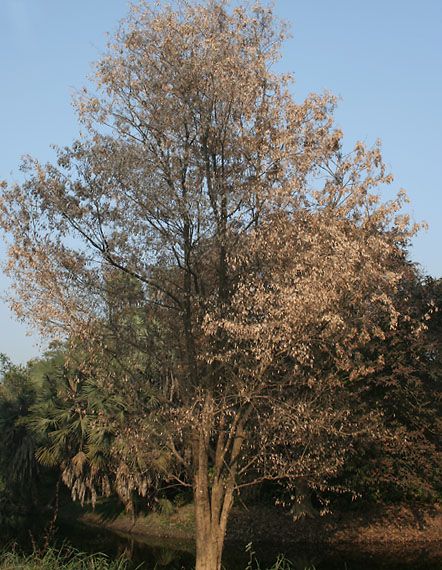

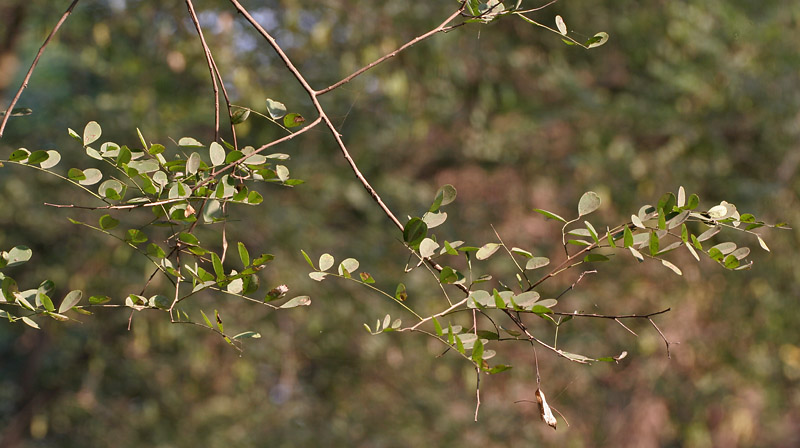

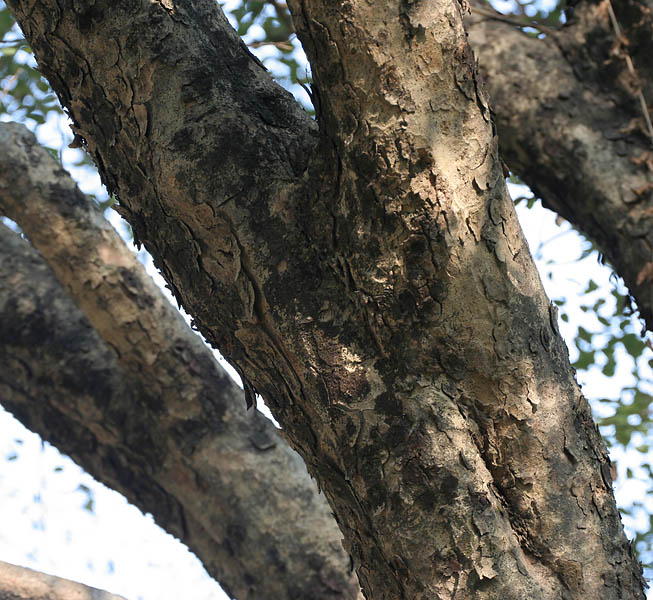
