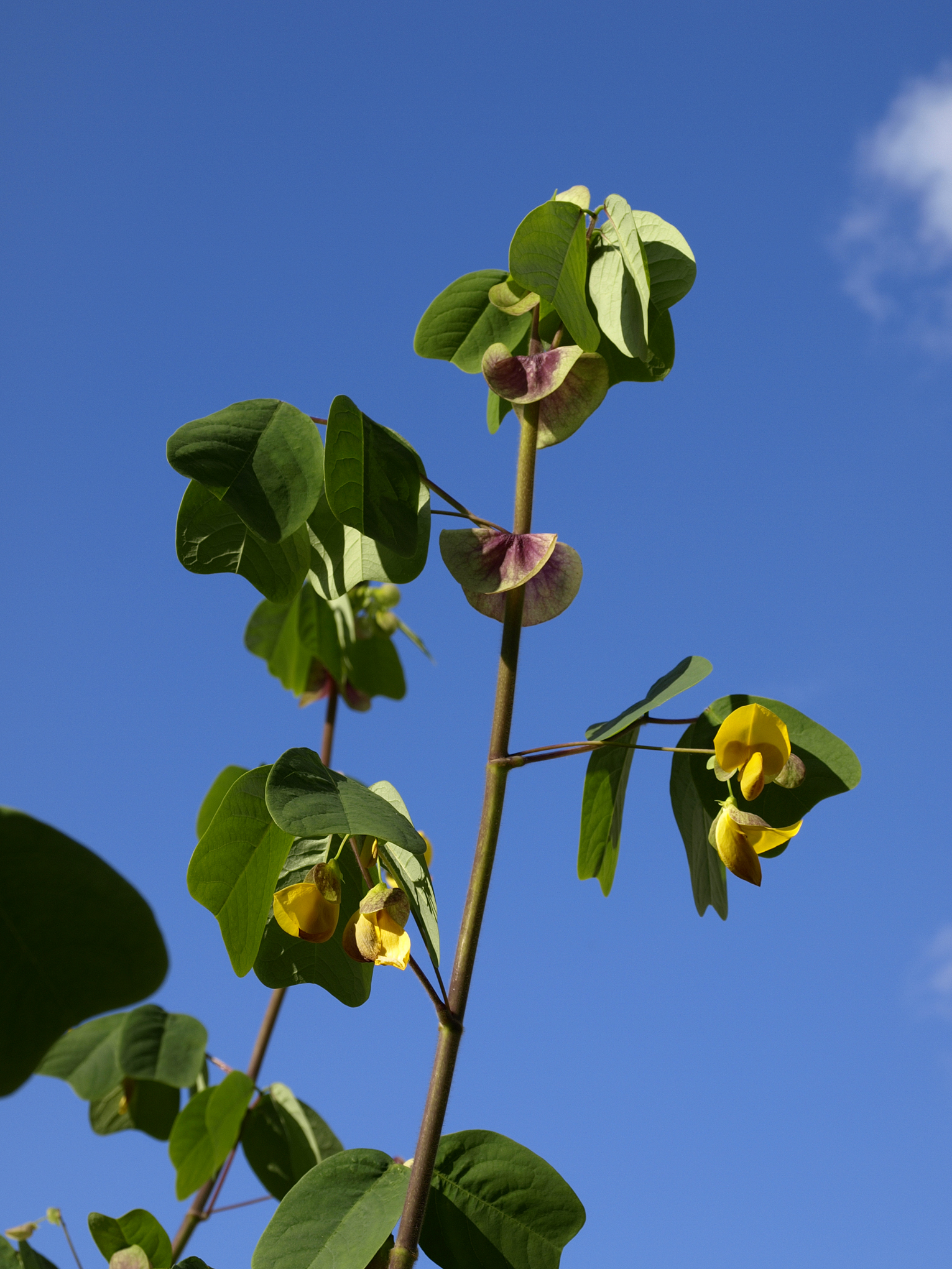
- Amicia zygomeris

Scientific classification
- Kingdom: Plantae
- Clade: Tracheophytes
- Clade: Angiosperms
- Clade: Eudicots
- Clade: Rosids
- Order: Fabales
- Family: Fabaceae
- Subfamily: Faboideae
- Tribe: Dalbergieae
- Genus: Amicia; Kunth (1824)

Species
- Amicia andicola (Griseb.) Harms; Amicia fimbriata Kuntze; Amicia glandulosa Kunth; Amicia lobbiana Benth.; Amicia medicaginea Griseb.; Amicia micrantha Harms ex Kuntze; Amicia zygomeris DC.

Synonyms
- Zygomeris DC. (1825), pro syn.

= Amicia =

Genus of legumes

Amicia is a genus of flowering plants in the legume family, Fabaceae. It includes seven species which are native to Mexico, Panama, Ecuador, Peru, Bolivia, and northwestern Argentina. It belongs to the subfamily Faboideae, and was recently assigned to the informal monophyletic Adesmia clade. It is named in honor of the Italian astronomer, mathematician and microscopist Giovanni Battista Amici (1786–1863).

- Amicia andicola (Griseb.) Harms – central Bolivia to northwestern Argentina
- Amicia fimbriata Kuntze – central Bolivia to northwestern Argentina

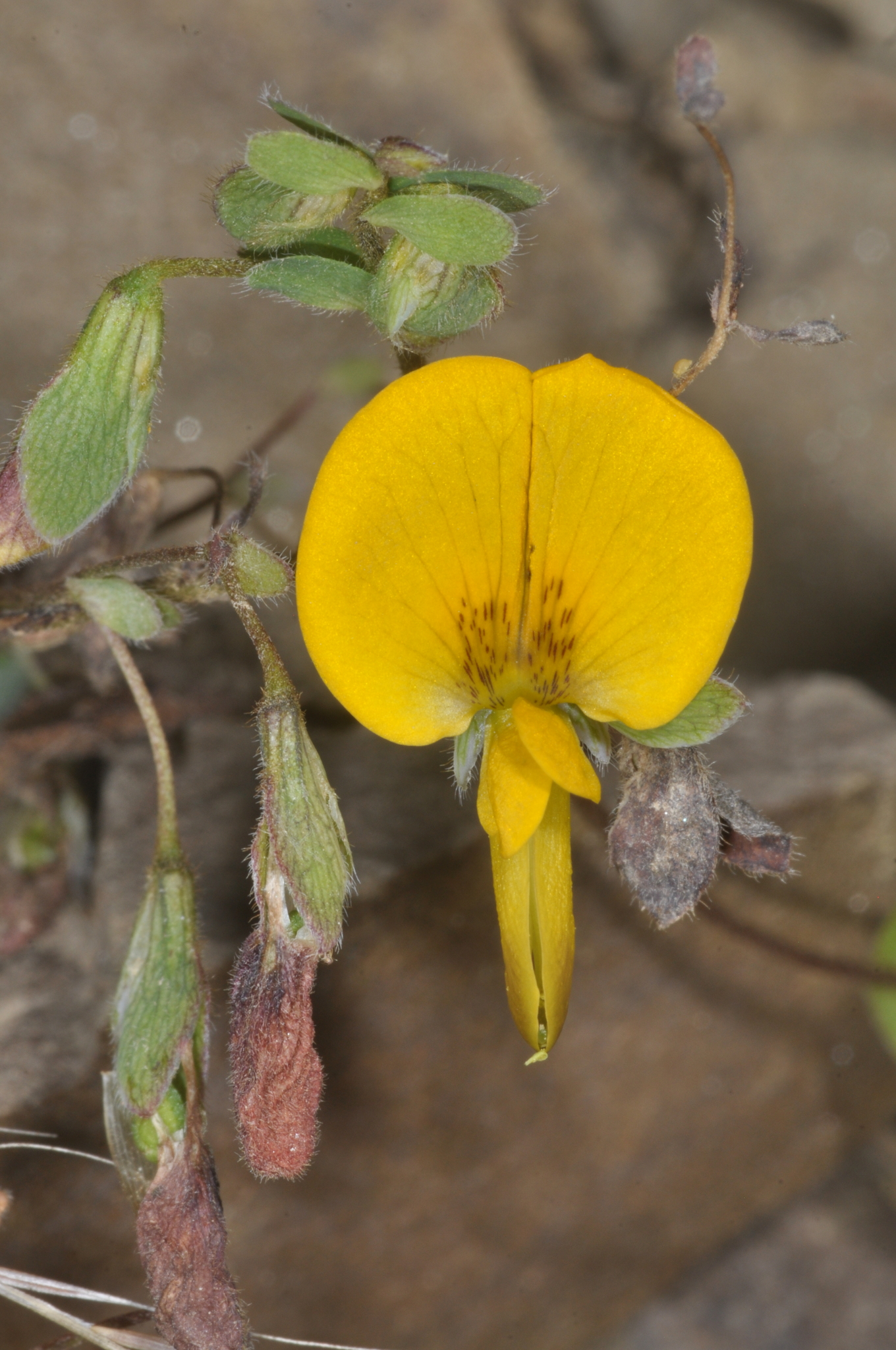
Amicia fimbriata flower observed in northern Argentina

- Amicia glandulosa Kunth – southern Panama, Ecuador, and northern Peru
- Amicia lobbiana Benth. – central Peru to central Bolivia
- Amicia medicaginea Griseb. – Bolivia and northwestern Argentina
- Amicia micrantha Harms ex Kuntze – Bolivia
- Amicia zygomeris DC. – Mexico
