= Ormocarpopsis nitida =

Scientific classification
- Kingdom: Plantae
- Clade: Tracheophytes
- Clade: Angiosperms
- Clade: Eudicots
- Clade: Rosids
- Order: Fabales
- Family: Fabaceae
- Subfamily: Faboideae
- Genus: Ormocarpopsis
- Species: O. nitida

Binomial name
- Ormocarpopsis nitida (Du Puy & Labat) Thulin & Lavin

Synonyms
- Peltiera alaotrensis Du Puy & Labat; Peltiera nitida Du Puy & Labat

Species of legume

Ormocarpopsis nitida (common name sefontsohy) is a species of flowering plants in the legume family, Fabaceae. It belongs to the subfamily Faboideae. It is found only in Madagascar.
