= Cascaronia =

Conservation status
- Least Concern (IUCN 3.1)

Scientific classification
- Kingdom: Plantae
- Clade: Tracheophytes
- Clade: Angiosperms
- Clade: Eudicots
- Clade: Rosids
- Order: Fabales
- Family: Fabaceae
- Subfamily: Faboideae
- Tribe: Dalbergieae
- Genus: Cascaronia; Griseb.
- Species: C. astragalina

Binomial name
- Cascaronia astragalina Griseb.

Genus of legumes

Cascaronia astragalina is a species of flowering plant in the legume family, Fabaceae. It is the sole member of the genus Cascaronia. It is a spindly shrub or multi-stemmed tree native to southern Bolivia and northwestern Argentina. It grows in seasonally dry subtropical forests, at forest margins, and along rivers.

Cascaronia belongs to the subfamily Faboideae and has been recently assigned to the informal monophyletic Pterocarpus clade of the Dalbergieae.
