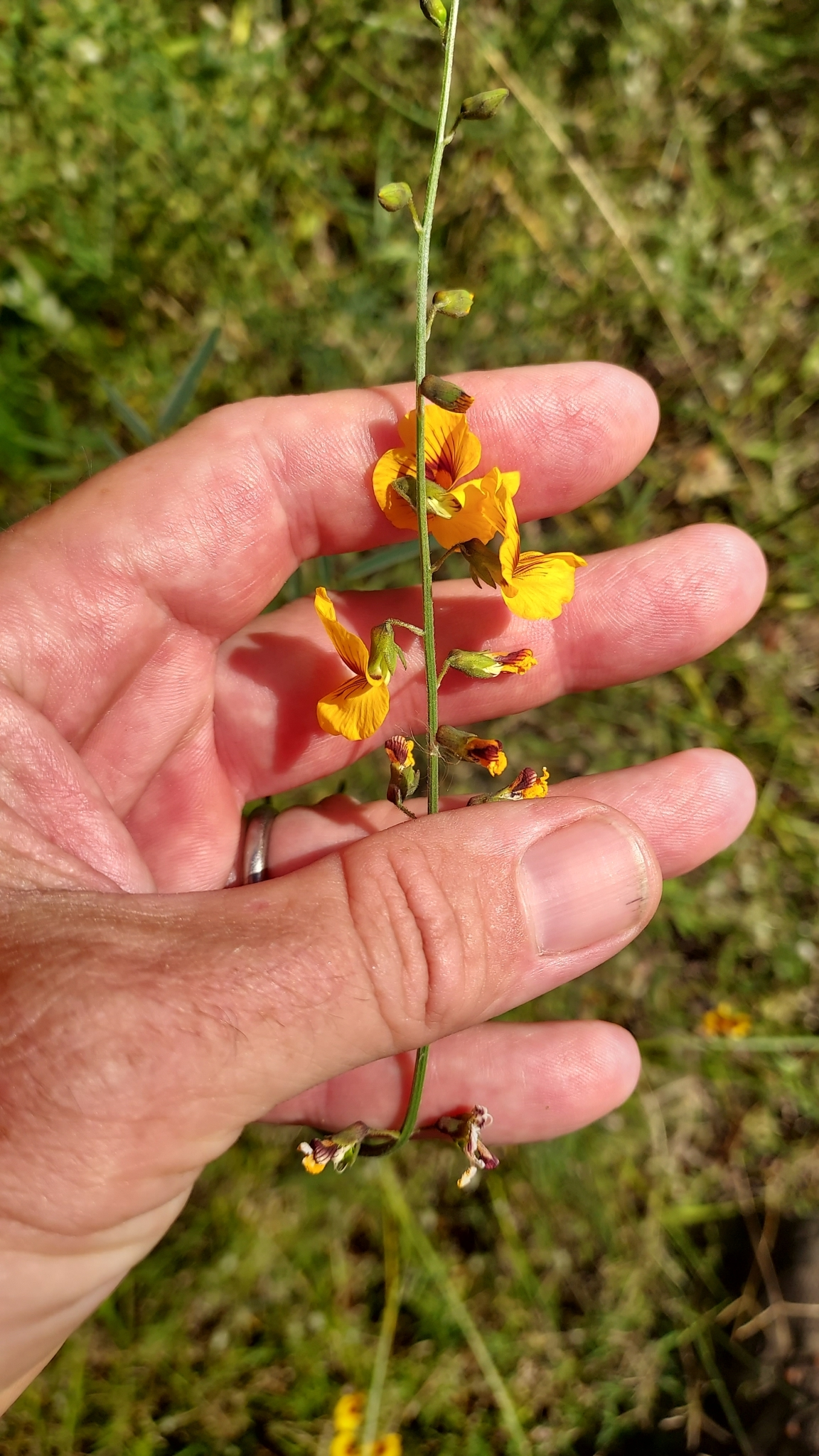

Scientific classification
- Kingdom: Plantae
- Clade: Tracheophytes
- Clade: Angiosperms
- Clade: Eudicots
- Clade: Rosids
- Order: Fabales
- Family: Fabaceae
- Subfamily: Faboideae
- Genus: Discolobium
- Species: D. psoraleifolium

Binomial name
- Discolobium psoraleifolium Benth.

= Discolobium psoraleifolium =

Species of flowering plant

Discolobium psoraleifolium is a species of flowering plant in the family Fabaceae. As a species native to South America, it can be found in Uruguay, Northeast Argentina, West-Central and South Brazil.

== Taxonomy ==
The species was first described by George Bentham in 1859 under its current binomial name.

=== Etymology ===
The Latin specific epithet psoraleifolium means "Psoralea-leaved", implying the species' leaves bear a resemblance to the pinnate, compound leaves of certain Psoralea species.
