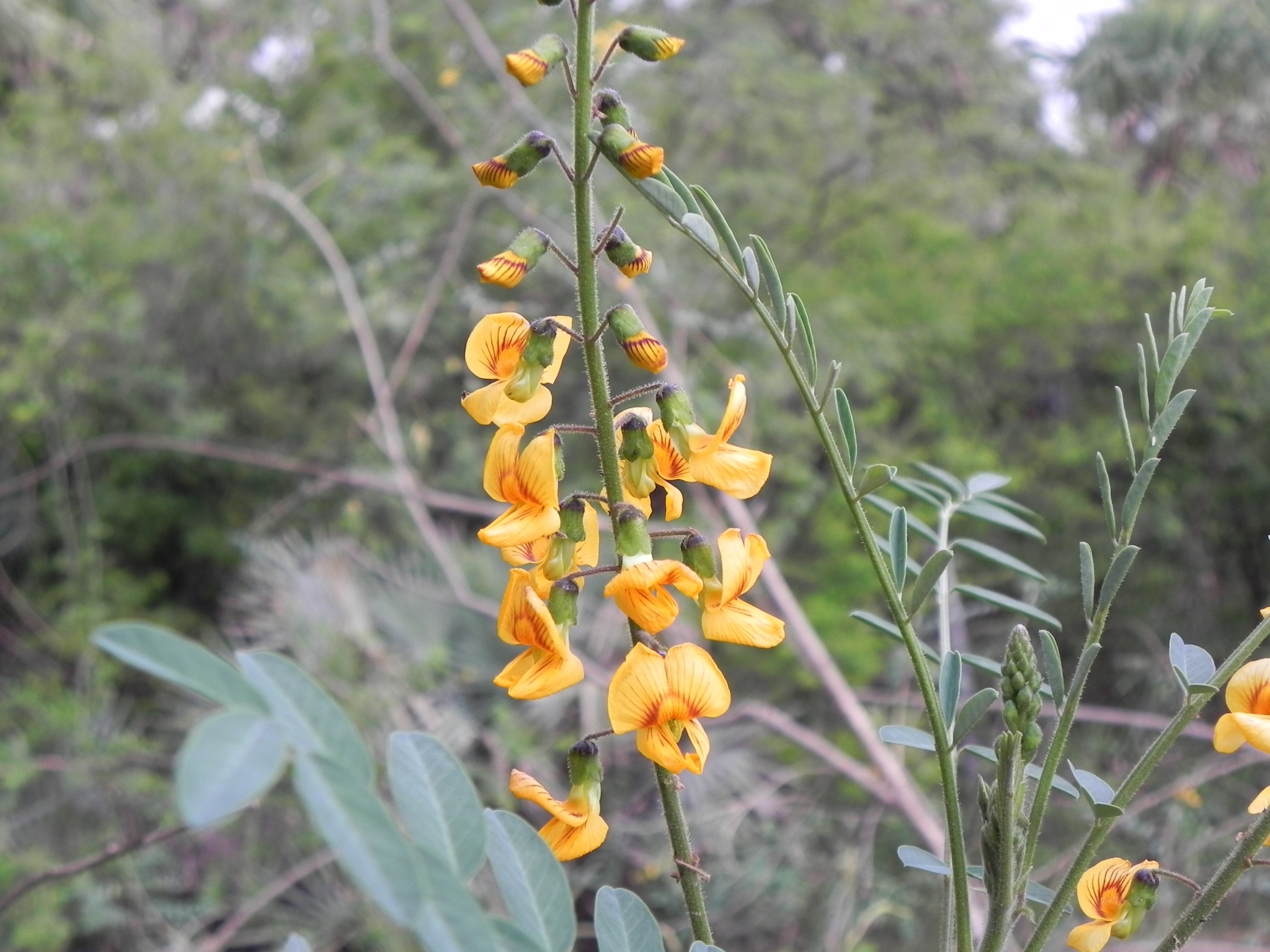

Scientific classification
- Kingdom: Plantae
- Clade: Tracheophytes
- Clade: Angiosperms
- Clade: Eudicots
- Clade: Rosids
- Order: Fabales
- Family: Fabaceae
- Subfamily: Faboideae
- Genus: Discolobium
- Species: D. pulchellum

Binomial name
- Discolobium pulchellum Benth.

= Discolobium pulchellum =

Species of flowering plant

Discolobium pulchellum is a species of flowering plant in the family Fabaceae. It is native to South America and natively occurs in Bolivia, Paraguay, West-Central Brazil and Northeast Argentina.

== Taxonomy ==
The species was first described by George Bentham as Discolobium elongatum, which was renamed in 1937 to its current binomial name.

=== Etymology ===
The Latin specific epithet pulchellum means "pretty little" or "beautiful little" and is the diminutive form of the Latin word pulcher, which means "beautiful"
