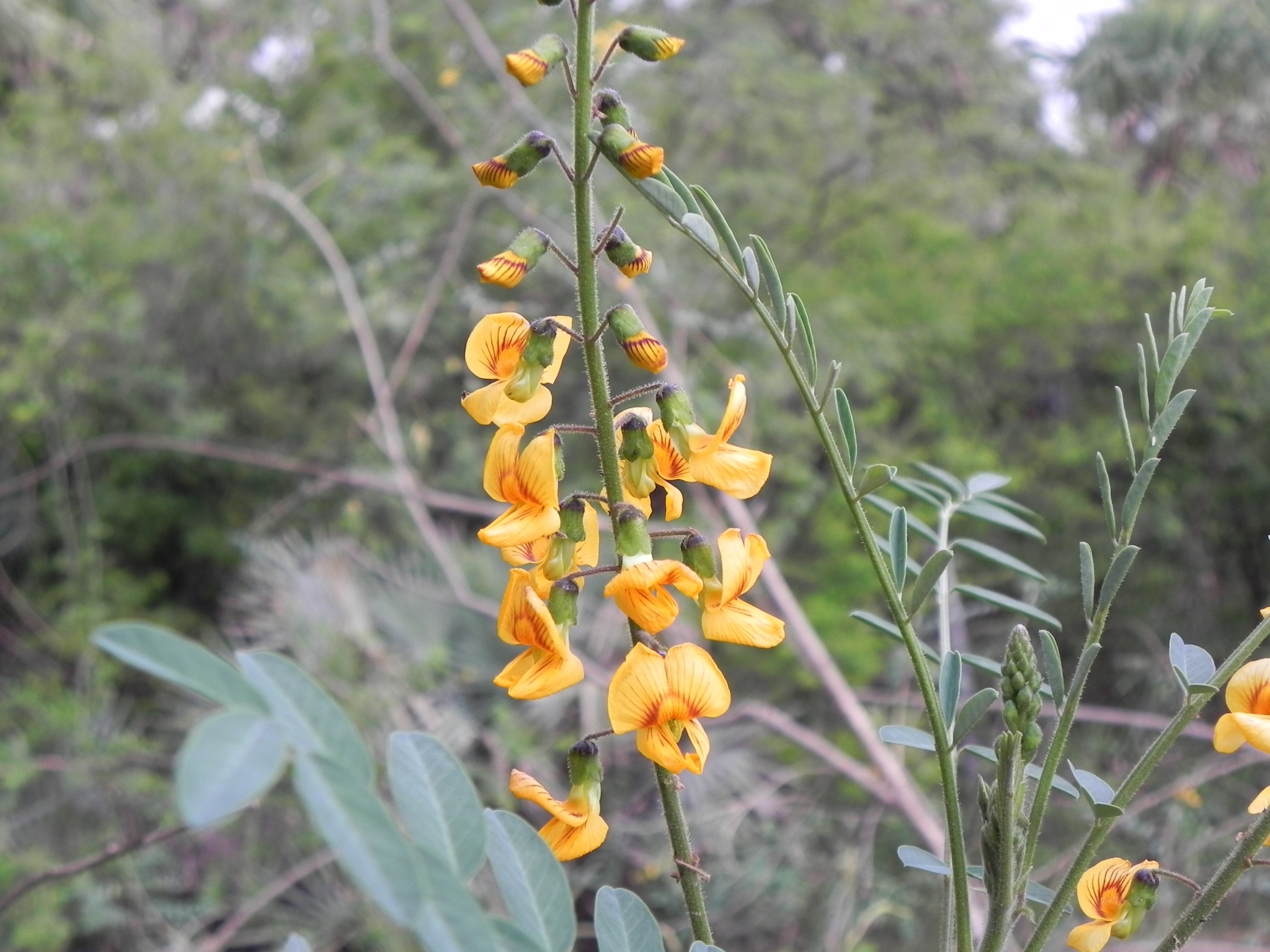
- Discolobium pulchellum

Scientific classification
- Kingdom: Plantae
- Clade: Embryophytes
- Clade: Tracheophytes
- Clade: Spermatophytes
- Clade: Angiosperms
- Clade: Eudicots
- Clade: Rosids
- Order: Fabales
- Family: Fabaceae
- Subfamily: Faboideae
- Tribe: Dalbergieae
- Genus: Discolobium; Benth. (1837)

Species
- Discolobium hirtum Benth.; Discolobium junceum M.Micheli; Discolobium leptophyllum Benth.; Discolobium paucijugum Harms ex Kuntze; Discolobium psoraleifolium Benth.; Discolobium pulchellum Benth.; Discolobium tocantinum Ducke

= Discolobium =

Genus of legumes

Discolobium is a genus of flowering plants in the legume family, Fabaceae. It belongs to the subfamily Faboideae, and was recently assigned to the informal monophyletic Pterocarpus clade of the Dalbergieae. It includes seven species native to South America, ranging from northern Brazil to Bolivia and northern Argentina.
