= Fissicalyx =

Scientific classification
- Kingdom: Plantae
- Clade: Tracheophytes
- Clade: Angiosperms
- Clade: Eudicots
- Clade: Rosids
- Order: Fabales
- Family: Fabaceae
- Subfamily: Faboideae
- Tribe: Dalbergieae
- Genus: Fissicalyx; Benth. (1860)
- Species: F. fendleri

Binomial name
- Fissicalyx fendleri Benth. (1860)

Synonyms
- Monopteryx jahnii Pittier (1915)

Genus of legumes

Fissicalyx fendleri is a species of flowering plant in the legume family, Fabaceae. It is a tree native to the tropical Americas, ranging from Panama through Colombia, Venezuela, and Guyana to northern Brazil. It grows in humid lowland forest.

It belongs to subfamily Faboideae, and was recently assigned to the informal monophyletic Pterocarpus clade of the Dalbergieae. It is the only member of the genus Fissicalyx.
