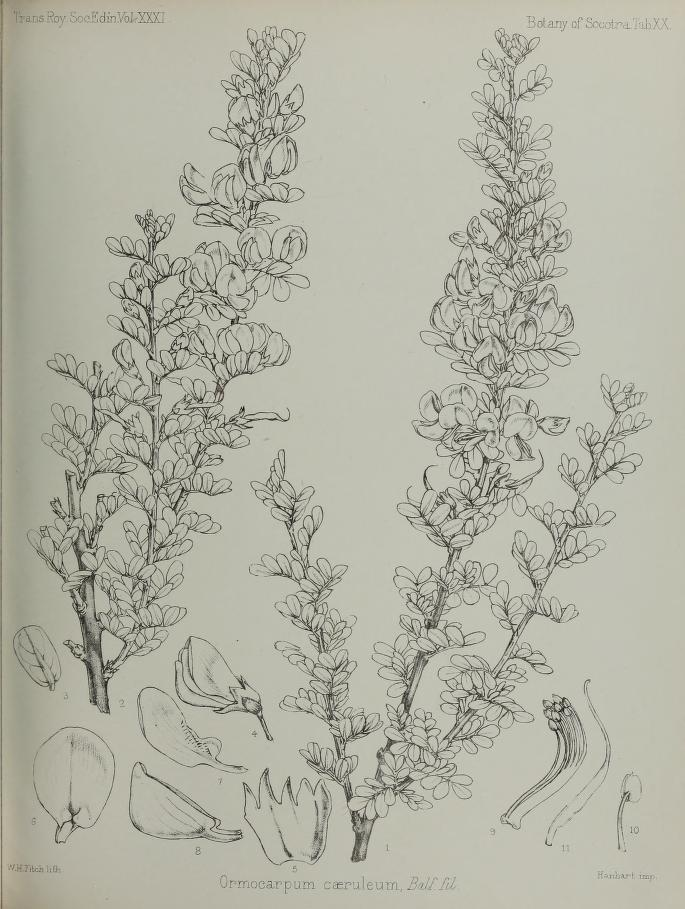

Conservation status
- Least Concern (IUCN 3.1)

Scientific classification
- Kingdom: Plantae
- Clade: Tracheophytes
- Clade: Angiosperms
- Clade: Eudicots
- Clade: Rosids
- Order: Fabales
- Family: Fabaceae
- Subfamily: Faboideae
- Genus: Zygocarpum
- Species: Z. caeruleum

Binomial name
- Zygocarpum caeruleum Balf.f. Thulin & Lavin

Synonyms
- Diphaca caerulea (Balf.f.) Taub.; Ormocarpum caeruleum Balf.f.; Solulus caeruleus (Balf.f.) Kuntze

= Zygocarpum caeruleum =

Species of plant

Zygocarpum caeruleum is a species of flowering plant in the family Fabaceae. It is a shrub or tree endemic to Socotra in Yemen. Its natural habitats are subtropical or tropical dry forests and subtropical or tropical dry shrubland.

== Habitat ==
Common in semi-deciduous woodland and shrubland, mainly on the limestone plateaus but also on granite in the Hajhir Mountains, at elevations of (50–)200–800 m.

Recognized by the violet-blue flowers. Usually a slender tree or shrub but can be prostrate in windswept places on the limestone plateau. However, it is easily recognized, even when not in flower, by the distinctive purplish black line along the midrib on the undersurface of the leaflets.
