= Bryaspis =

Scientific classification
- Kingdom: Plantae
- Clade: Tracheophytes
- Clade: Angiosperms
- Clade: Eudicots
- Clade: Rosids
- Order: Fabales
- Family: Fabaceae
- Subfamily: Faboideae
- Tribe: Dalbergieae
- Genus: Bryaspis; P.A.Duvign. (1954)

Species
- Bryaspis humularioides Gledhill; Bryaspis psittacorhyncha (Webb) Govaerts

Genus of legumes

Bryaspis is a small genus of flowering plants in the legume family, Fabaceae. It includes two species of herbaceous plants native to equatorial West Africa and Cameroon. It belongs to the subfamily Faboideae, and was recently assigned to the informal monophyletic Dalbergia clade of the Dalbergieae. Typical habitats are seasonally dry tropical grassland and open areas, often growing in wet, swampy, rocky and sandy soil. Plants can be weeds on cultivated land.

- Bryaspis humularioides Gledhill – Guinea, Sierra Leone, and Liberia
- Bryaspis psittacorhyncha (Webb) Govaerts – Senegal to Guinea and Sierra Leone; Cameroon
