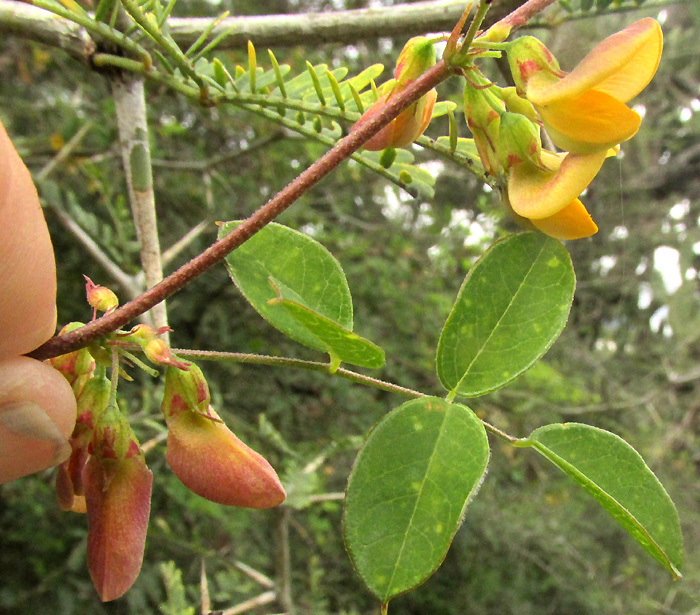
- Nissolia pringlei

Scientific classification
- Kingdom: Plantae
- Clade: Tracheophytes
- Clade: Angiosperms
- Clade: Eudicots
- Clade: Rosids
- Order: Fabales
- Family: Fabaceae
- Subfamily: Faboideae
- Genus: Nissolia
- Species: N. pringlei

Binomial name
- Nissolia pringlei Rose, 1897

Synonyms
- Nissolia diversifolia Rose (1897)

= Nissolia pringlei =

Species of plant

Nissolia pringlei has no commonly used English name, though some may call it Pringle's nissolia and all Nissolia species can be referred to as yellowhoods. It's a woody, climbing species, a liana, in the huge fFamily Fabaceae.

== Description ==
Nissolia pringlei, besides being a woody, climbing vine with papilionaceous flowers and leaves usually divided into 5 leaflets, is distinguished by these features:

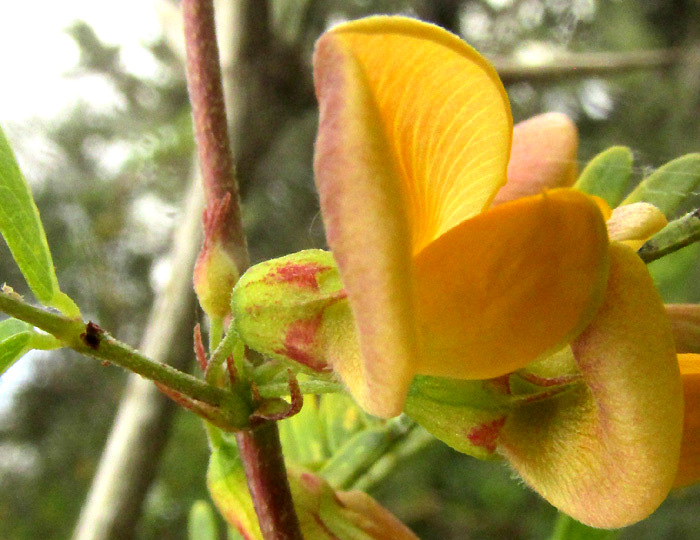
Nissolia pringlei flower

- Inflorescences are raceme-type and arise along the stem.
- Flowers are yellow and relatively large for the genus, up to 1.3 cm long (~1/2 inch).
- Sepals of the bell-shaped calyx form 5 teeth more or less of the same height and shorter than the calyx tube.
- Stipules are less than 1mm wide (~1/32 inch).
- leaflets are almost hairless, rounded at bases and around 25mm long (~1 inch).
- Stems and sepals rarely bear glandular setae.
- Fruits are up to 3 cm long (1 1/5 inches) with 2 or 3 weakly hairy segments, the terminal segment sterile and wider and longer than the other segments, forming a wing.

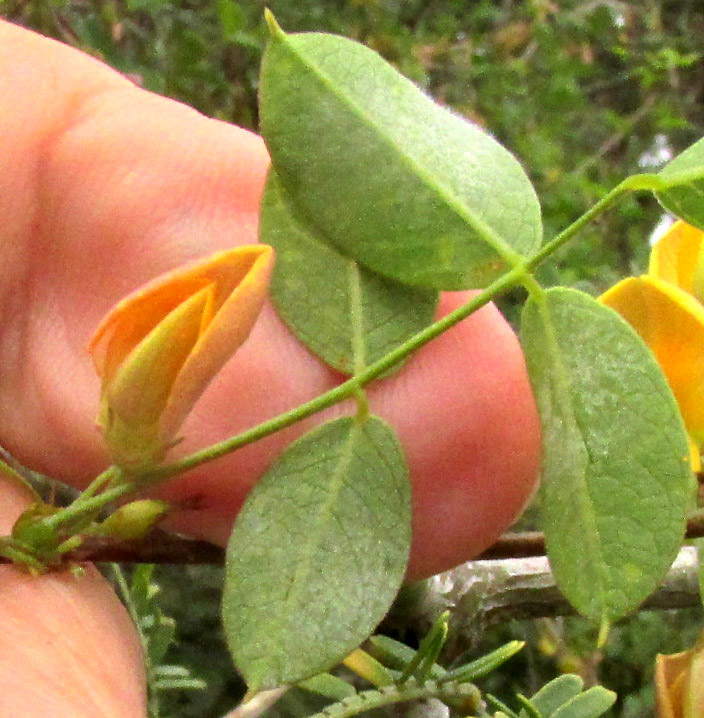
Nissolia pringlei leaflet undersurfaces

== Distribution ==
Nissolia pringlei is endemic just to Mexico, occurring in the northern states of Chihuahua, Coahuila and Nuevo León south into the states of Querétaro, Morelos and Puebla.

== Habitat ==
Nissolia pringlei inhabits Tamaulipan thornscrub and foothill scrub, oak forest, and oak-conifer forest at elevations of 360–1890 meters (~1200-6200 feet). Images on this page show a plant twining in a hedgerow of spiny trees and cacti in an overgrazed scrub area of central Mexico at an elevation of ~1900 meters (6200 feet).

== Taxonomy ==
Nissolia pringlei is very similar to Nissolia platycarpa. Here are apparent differences between the two taxa:

- N. pringlei calyxes are densely covered with fine, soft, pressed hairs, like silk, while N. platycarpa calyxes bear dispersed glandular trichomes.
- N. pringlei calyxes have teeth up to 0.5mm long, while N. platycarpa calyx teeth are up to 2.2mm long.
- The two species mosty occupy different distribution areas, though in some locations they overlap.

The type specimen was collected in the Santa Eulalia Mountains in Chihuahua state, on September 15, 1895 by C.G. Pringle, his #324. The holotype is designated US00001851! Originally Joseph Nelson Rose named the specimen Nissolia diversifolia.

== Etymology ==
When the genus name Nissolia first was published by Nikolaus Joseph von Jacquin in 1760, no explanation for choosing the name was given. Possibly the best candidate for the honor of the name is Guillaume Nissole (1647-1734), who taught at Montpellier in France and influenced students from the Americas who later worked in the biological sciences.

The species name pringlei honors Cyrus Pringle, who collected the type specimen.
