= Zygocarpum dhofarense =

Conservation status
- Vulnerable (IUCN 2.3)

Scientific classification
- Kingdom: Plantae
- Clade: Tracheophytes
- Clade: Angiosperms
- Clade: Eudicots
- Clade: Rosids
- Order: Fabales
- Family: Fabaceae
- Subfamily: Faboideae
- Genus: Zygocarpum
- Species: Z. dhofarense

Binomial name
- Zygocarpum dhofarense (Hillc. & Gillett) Thulin & Lavin
- Range of Zygocarpum dhofarense.

Synonyms
- Ormocarpum dhofarense (Hillc. & Gillett)

Species of legume

Zygocarpum dhofarense is a species of flowering plant in the family Fabaceae. It is found in Oman and Yemen. It is threatened by habitat loss.
