= Ormocarpum klainei =

Conservation status
- Endangered (IUCN 3.1)

Scientific classification
- Kingdom: Plantae
- Clade: Tracheophytes
- Clade: Angiosperms
- Clade: Eudicots
- Clade: Rosids
- Order: Fabales
- Family: Fabaceae
- Subfamily: Faboideae
- Genus: Ormocarpum
- Species: O. klainei

Binomial name
- Ormocarpum klainei Tisser.

Species of legume

Ormocarpum klainei is a species of plant in the family Fabaceae. It is found in Cameroon and Gabon. Its natural habitat is subtropical or tropical dry forests. It is threatened by habitat loss.
