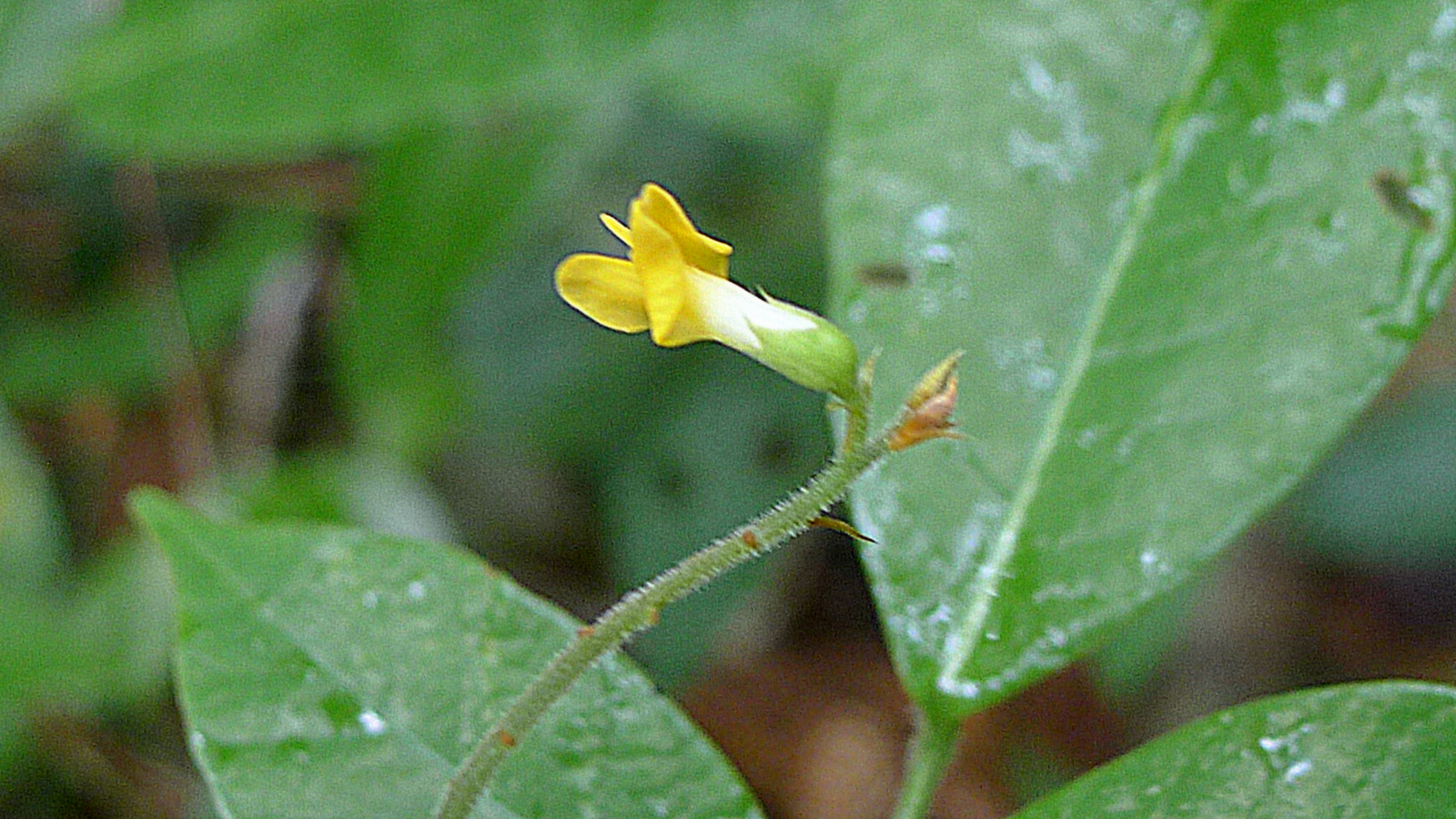
- Cranocarpus mezii

Scientific classification
- Kingdom: Plantae
- Clade: Tracheophytes
- Clade: Angiosperms
- Clade: Eudicots
- Clade: Rosids
- Order: Fabales
- Family: Fabaceae
- Subfamily: Faboideae
- Tribe: Dalbergieae
- Genus: Cranocarpus; Benth. (1859)

Species
- Cranocarpus gracilis A.Fern. & P.Bezerra; Cranocarpus martii Benth.; Cranocarpus mezii Taub.

= Cranocarpus =

Genus of legumes

Cranocarpus is a genus of flowering plants in the legume family, Fabaceae. It includes three species native to northern and eastern Brazil. It belongs to subfamily Faboideae, and was recently assigned to the informal monophyletic Pterocarpus clade of the Dalbergieae.
