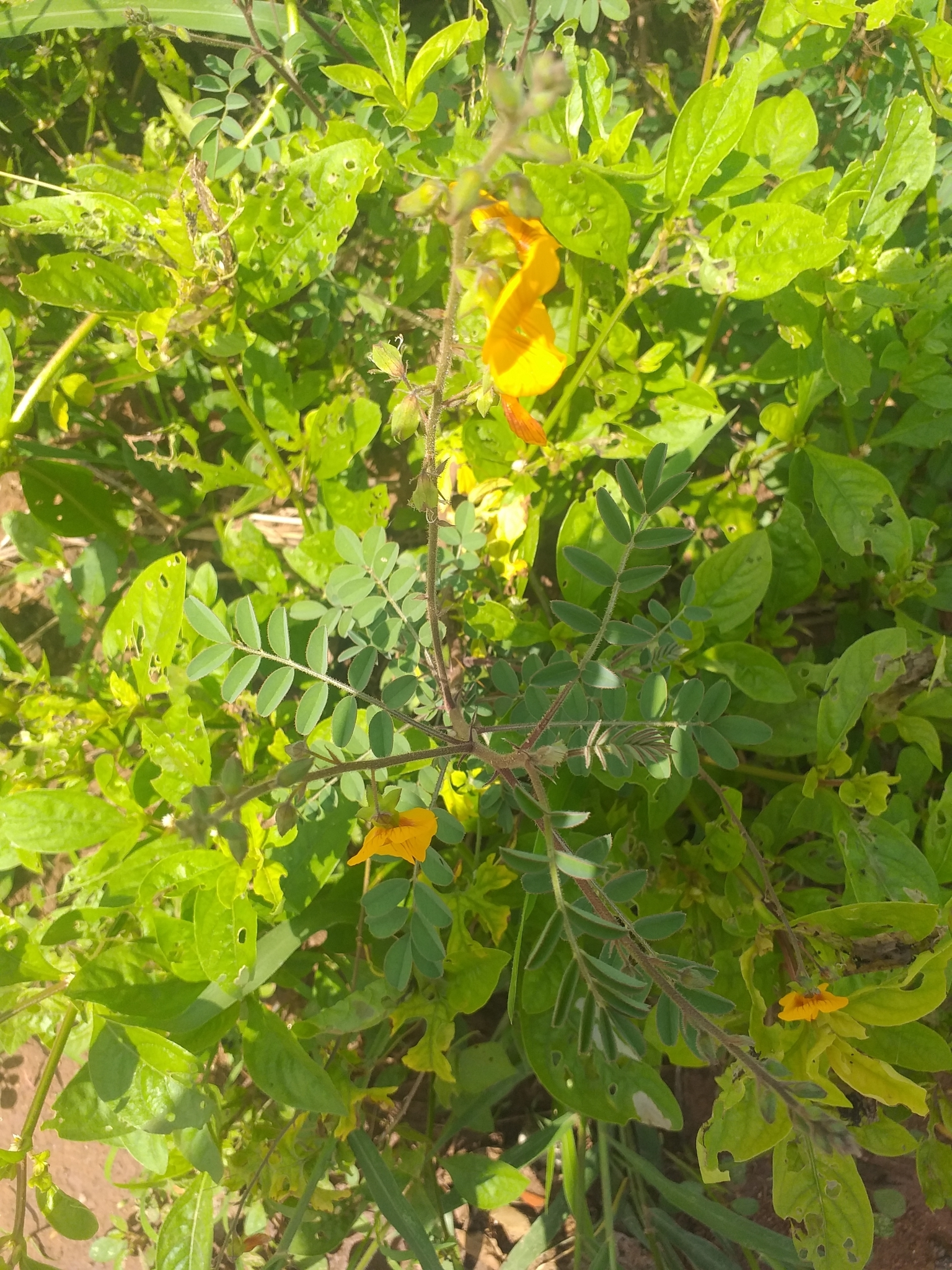

Scientific classification
- Kingdom: Plantae
- Clade: Tracheophytes
- Clade: Angiosperms
- Clade: Eudicots
- Clade: Rosids
- Order: Fabales
- Family: Fabaceae
- Subfamily: Faboideae
- Genus: Discolobium
- Species: D. hirtum

Binomial name
- Discolobium hirtum Benth.

= Discolobium hirtum =

Species of flowering plant

Discolobium hirtum is a species of flowering plant in the family Fabaceae. It is endemic to Brazil, specifically the Northeast Region of the country.
