= Discolobium tocantinum =

Scientific classification
- Kingdom: Plantae
- Clade: Tracheophytes
- Clade: Angiosperms
- Clade: Eudicots
- Clade: Rosids
- Order: Fabales
- Family: Fabaceae
- Subfamily: Faboideae
- Genus: Discolobium
- Species: D. tocantinum

Binomial name
- Discolobium tocantinum Ducke

Species of flowering plant

Discolobium tocantinum is a species of flowering plant in the family Fabaceae. It is native and endemic to North Brazil.

== Taxonomy ==
The species was first described by Adolpho Ducke in 1922 under its current binomial name.
