= Ramón Ferreyra =

Peruvian botanist (1910–2005)

Ramón Alejandro Ferreyra Huerta (born 26 February 1910 in Lima - died 4 June 2005) was a Peruvian botanist. Ferreyra was awarded a Guggenheim Fellowship in 1950.
