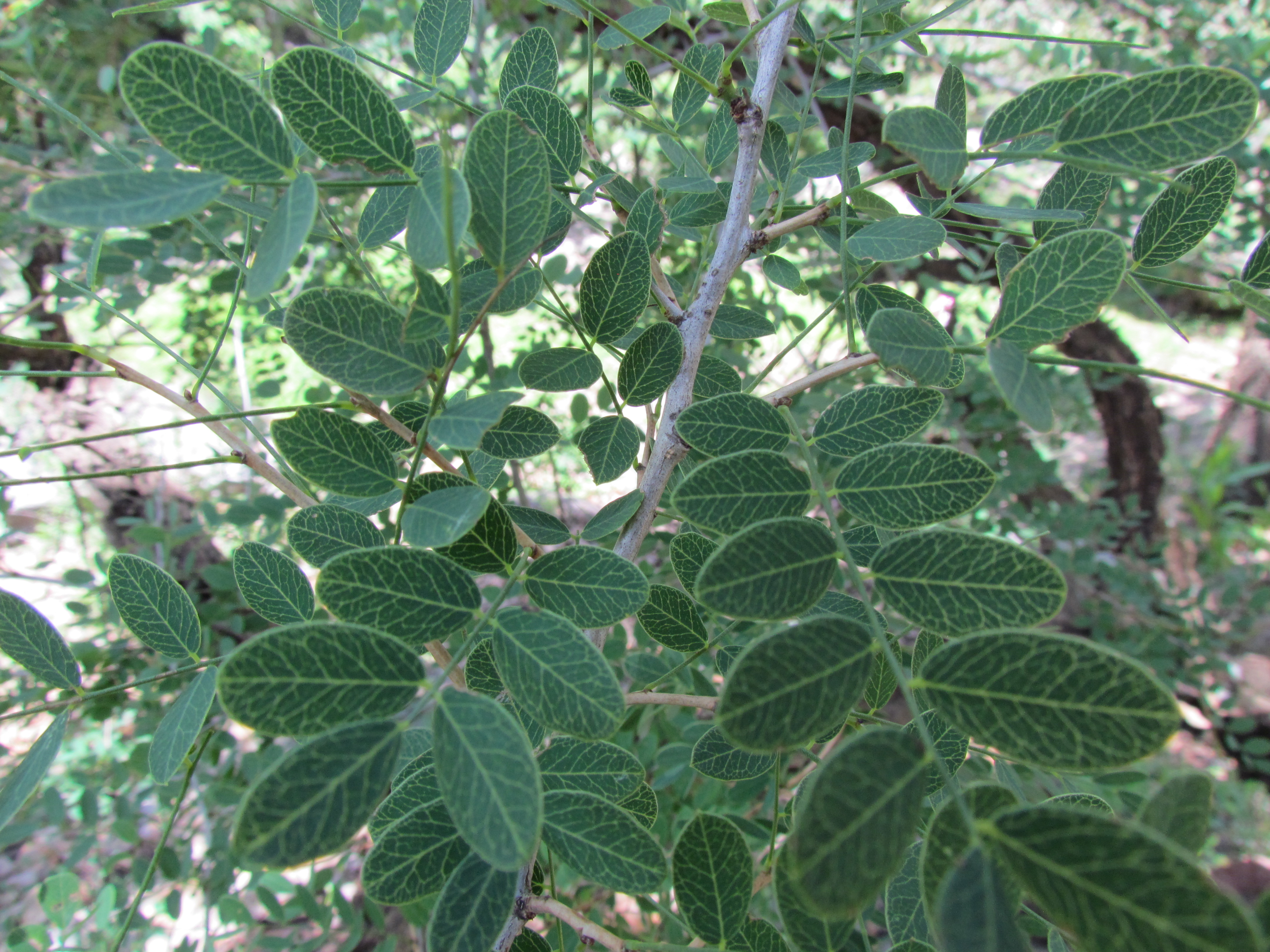
- Diphysa suberosa

Scientific classification
- Kingdom: Plantae
- Clade: Tracheophytes
- Clade: Angiosperms
- Clade: Eudicots
- Clade: Rosids
- Order: Fabales
- Family: Fabaceae
- Subfamily: Faboideae
- Tribe: Dalbergieae
- Genus: Diphysa; Jacq.

Type species
- Diphysa carthagenensis Jacq.

Species
- 22; see text

= Diphysa =

Genus of legumes

Diphysa is a genus of flowering plants in the legume family, Fabaceae. It belongs to the subfamily Faboideae, and was recently assigned to the informal monophyletic Dalbergia clade of the Dalbergieae. It includes 22 species which range from Arizona through Mexico and Central America to Colombia and Venezuela.

- Diphysa americana (Mill.) M. Sousa
- Diphysa carthagenensis Jacq.
- Diphysa echinata Rose
- Diphysa floribunda Peyr.
- Diphysa humilis Oerst.
- Diphysa macrocarpa Standl.
- Diphysa macrophylla Lundell
- Diphysa microphylla Rydb.
- Diphysa minutifolia Rose
- Diphysa occidentalis Rose
- Diphysa ormocarpoides (Rudd) M.Sousa & R.Antonio
- Diphysa paucifoliolata R.Antonio & M.Sousa
- Diphysa puberulenta Rydb.
- Diphysa punctata Rydb.
- Diphysa racemosa Rose
- Diphysa sennoides Benth. & Oerst.
- Diphysa spinosa Rydb.
- Diphysa suberosa S. Watson
- Diphysa thurberi (A. Gray) Rydb.
- Diphysa vesicaria M.E.Jones
- Diphysa villosa Rydb.
- Diphysa yucatanensis Hanan-Alipi & M.Sousa
