= Ormocarpum =

Scientific classification
- Kingdom: Plantae
- Clade: Tracheophytes
- Clade: Angiosperms
- Clade: Eudicots
- Clade: Rosids
- Order: Fabales
- Family: Fabaceae
- Subfamily: Faboideae
- Clade: Dalbergioids
- Tribe: Dalbergieae
- Genus: Ormocarpum; P.Beauv. (1806)

Species
- 17; see text

Synonyms
- Acrotaphros Steud. ex A.Rich. (1848); Diphaca Lour. (1790); Rathkea Schumach. & Thonn. (1827); Saldania Sim (1909); Solulus Kuntze (1891), nom. superfl.

Genus of legumes

Ormocarpum is a genus of flowering plants in the legume family, Fabaceae. It includes 17 species native to tropical and southern Africa and parts of India, Indochina, Malesia, Papuasia, and the South Pacific. The genus was recently assigned to the informal monophyletic Dalbergia clade of the Dalbergieae.

== Species ==
Ormocarpum comprises the following species:

- Ormocarpum acuminatum Polhill
- Ormocarpum bernierianum (Baill.) Du Puy & Labat
- Ormocarpum cochinchinense (Lour.) Merr.
- Ormocarpum drakei R. Vig.
- Ormocarpum flavum J.B.Gillett
- Ormocarpum keniense J.B.Gillett
- Ormocarpum kirkii S.Moore
- Ormocarpum klainei Tisser.
- Ormocarpum megalophyllum Harms
- Ormocarpum muricatum Chiov.
- Ormocarpum pubescens (Hochst.) Cufod. ex J.B.Gillett
- Ormocarpum schliebenii Harms
- Ormocarpum sennoides (Willd.) DC.
- Ormocarpum suberosum Teijsm. & Binn. (unplaced)
- Ormocarpum trachycarpum (Taub.) Harms
- Ormocarpum trichocarpum (Taub.) Engl.
- Ormocarpum verrucosum P. Beauv.
- Ormocarpum zambesianum Verdc.
