= Dominique Dupuy (biologist) =

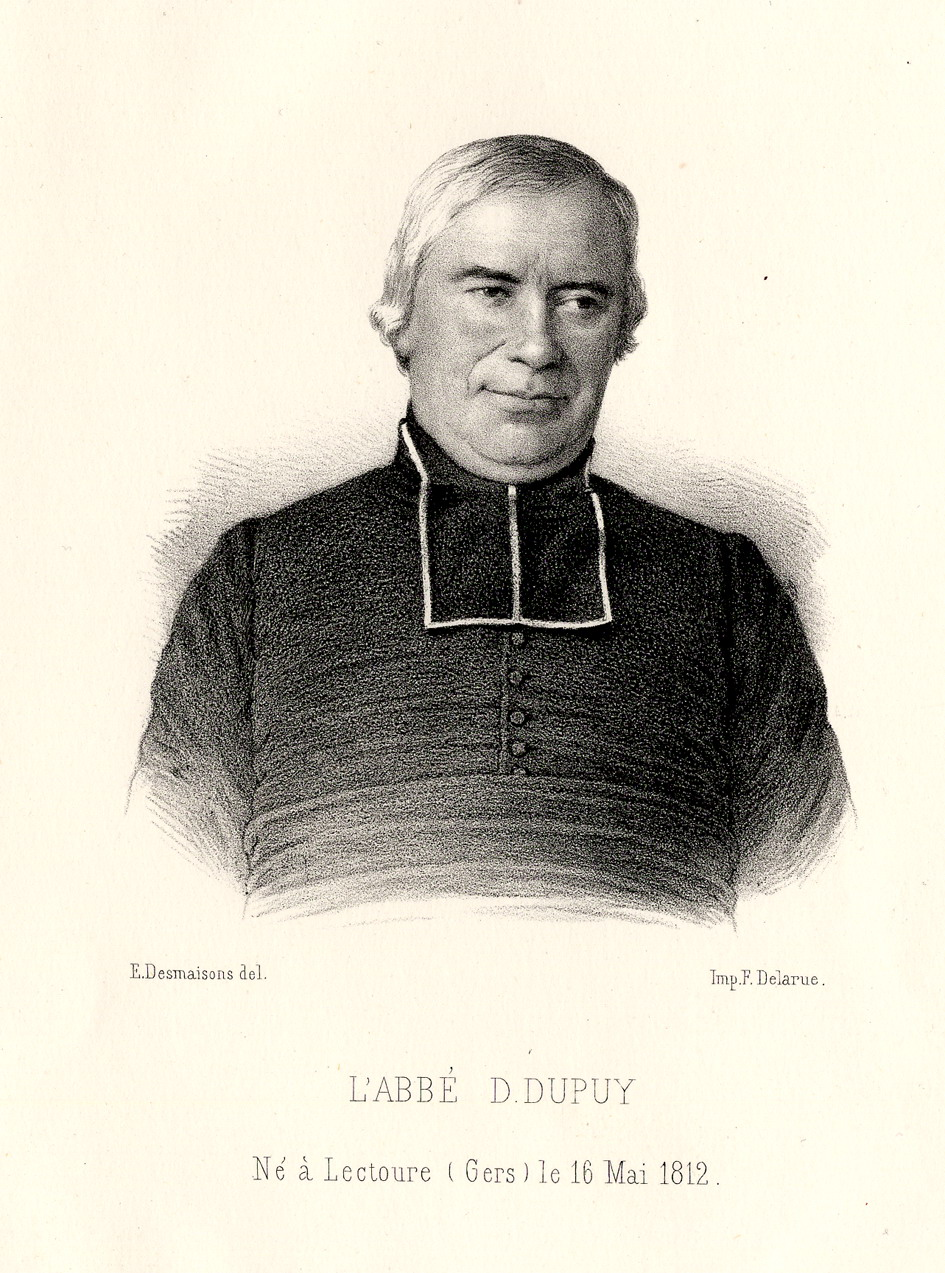
Dominique Dupuy

Dominique Dupuy (16 May 1812, Lectoure – 23 September 1885) was a French botanist and malacologist.

Abbé Dominique Dupuy was a professor of natural history in Auch. He was a member of the Société Départementale d'Agriculture et d'Horticulture du Gers, the Société Botanique de France and the Société d'Histoire Naturelle de Toulouse.

He wrote Histoire naturelle des mollusques terrestres et d'eau douce qui vivent en France, par l'Abbé D. Dupuy, avec planches lithographiées, par M.J. Delarue. Paris, V. Masson, 1847–1852. Online here at Biodiversity Heritage Library

== Honors and awards ==
Knight of the Order of Legion of Honour
