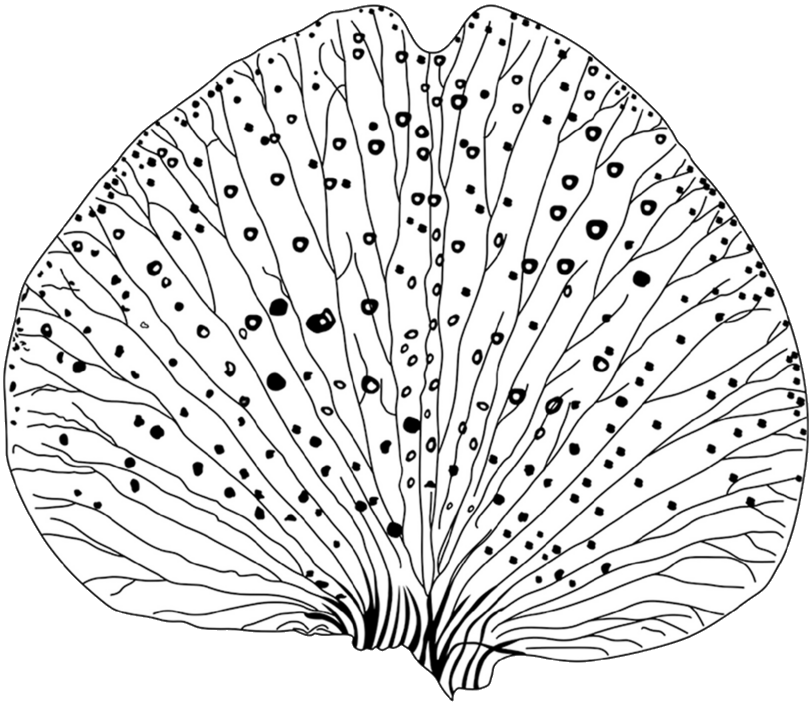
- Petal inner surface illustration

Scientific classification
- Kingdom: Plantae
- Clade: Tracheophytes
- Clade: Angiosperms
- Clade: Eudicots
- Clade: Rosids
- Order: Fabales
- Family: Fabaceae
- Subfamily: Faboideae
- Genus: Weberbauerella
- Species: W. brongniartioides

Binomial name
- Weberbauerella brongniartioides Ulbr.

= Weberbauerella brongniartioides =

Genus of legumes

Weberbauerella brongniartioides is a South American species of flowering plant in the family Fabaceae.

It is located in dunes along the coast of Peru, near Arequipa.
