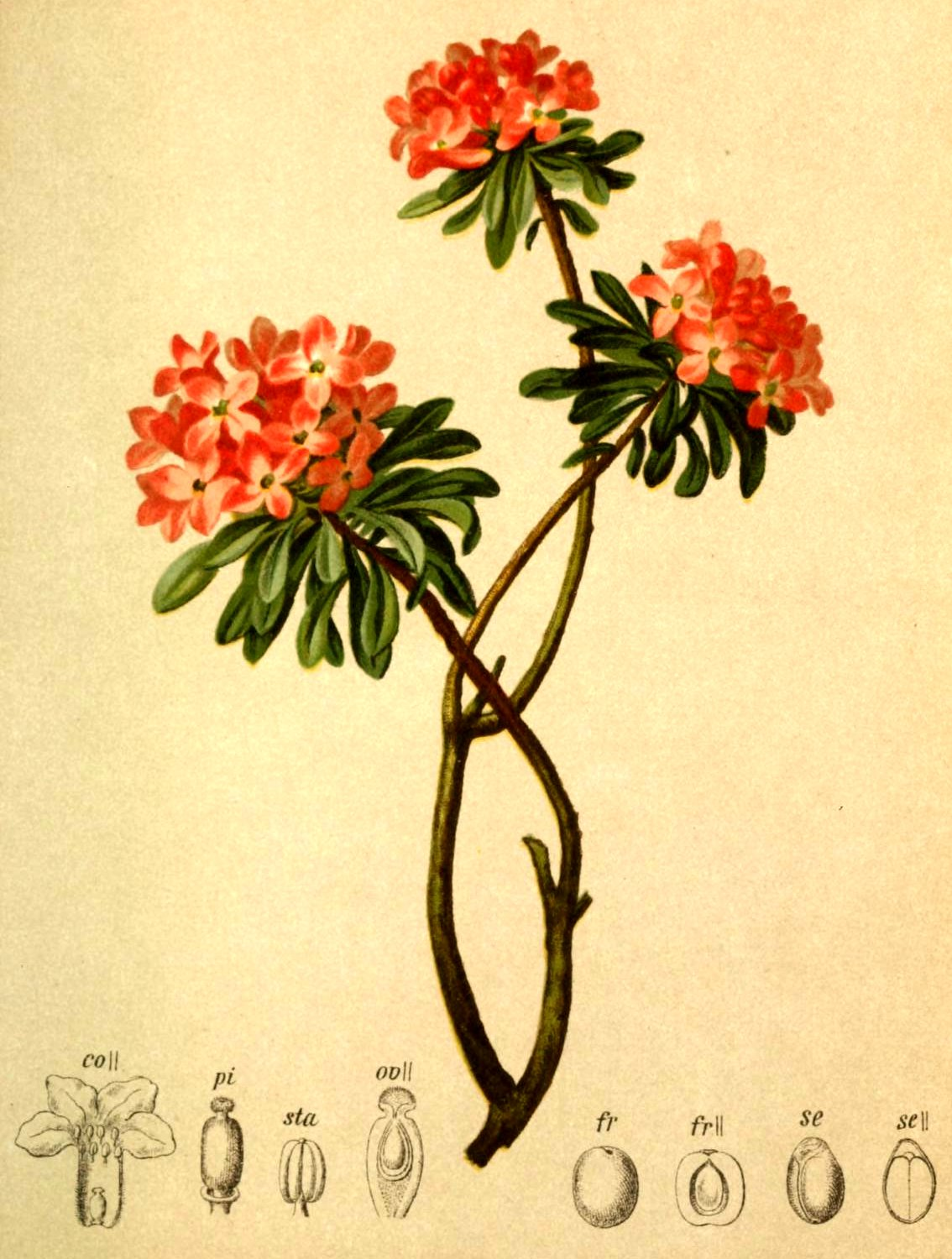
- Daphne striata

Scientific classification
- Kingdom: Plantae
- Clade: Tracheophytes
- Clade: Angiosperms
- Clade: Eudicots
- Clade: Rosids
- Order: Malvales
- Family: Thymelaeaceae
- Subfamily: Thymelaeoideae

Type genus
- Thymelaea

= Thymelaeoideae =

Subfamily of plants

Thymelaeoideae is a subfamily of the Thymelaeaceae family.

== Taxonomy ==
Synandrodaphneae: Synandrodaphne
Aquilarieae: Aquilaria, Gyrinops
Daphneae

Linostoma group: Craterosiphon, Dicranolepis, Enkleia, Jedda, Linostoma, Lophostoma, Synaptolepis
Phaleria group: Peddiea, Phaleria
Daphne group: Daphne, Daphnopsis, Diarthron, Dirca, Edgeworthia, Funifera, Goodallia, Lagetta, Ovidia, Rhamnoneuron, Schoenobiblus, Stellera, Thymelaea, Wikstroemia
Gnidia group: Dais, Drapetes, Gnidia, Kelleria, Lachnaea, Passerina, Pimelea, Struthiola
Incertae sedis: Linodendron, Stephanodaphne, Lasiadenia
