= Deltaria =

Conservation status
- Endangered (IUCN 3.1)

Scientific classification
- Kingdom: Plantae
- Clade: Tracheophytes
- Clade: Angiosperms
- Clade: Eudicots
- Clade: Rosids
- Order: Malvales
- Family: Thymelaeaceae
- Subfamily: Octolepidoideae
- Genus: Deltaria; Steenis
- Species: D. brachyblastophora

Binomial name
- Deltaria brachyblastophora Steenis

Genus of flowering plants

Deltaria brachyblastophora is a species of shrub in the Thymelaeaceae family. It is endemic to New Caledonia and the only species of the genus Deltaria. It is related to Arnhemia, Gonystylus, Lethedon and Solmsia.

The species grows only in the Koumac region in the north-west of Grande Terre. It grows in scrubland and gallery forest in the dry forest ecoregion from 12 to 600 metres elevation.
