= Lethedon =

Scientific classification
- Kingdom: Plantae
- Clade: Tracheophytes
- Clade: Angiosperms
- Clade: Eudicots
- Clade: Rosids
- Order: Malvales
- Family: Thymelaeaceae
- Subfamily: Octolepidoideae
- Genus: Lethedon; Biehler (1807)

Species
- 15, see text

Synonyms
- Kaernbachia Kuntze (1891); Microsemma Labill. (1825)

Genus of shrubs

Lethedon is a genus of shrubs in the Thymelaeaceae family native to Queensland, New Caledonia, and Vanuatu. It is related to Arnhemia, Deltaria, Gonystylus and Solmsia.

== Species ==
15 species are accepted.

- Lethedon balansae (Baill.) Kosterm.
- Lethedon calleana (Guillaumin) Kosterm.
- Lethedon cernua (Baill.) Kosterm.
- Lethedon ciliaris (Baill.) Kosterm.
- Lethedon comptonii (Baker f.) Kosterm.
- Lethedon cordatoretusa Aymonin
- Lethedon leratii (Guillaumin) Kosterm.
- Lethedon microphylla (Guillaumin) Kosterm.
- Lethedon oblonga (Schltr.) Kosterm.
- Lethedon ovata (Guillaumin) Kosterm.
- Lethedon salicifolia (Labill.) Aymonin
- Lethedon setosa (C.T.White) Kosterm.
- Lethedon sphaerocarpa (Baill. ex Guillaumin) Kosterm.
- Lethedon tannensis Biehler
- Lethedon thornei (Guillaumin) Aymonin
