= Goodallia =

Goodallia may refer to:

- Goodallia (bivalve), a genus of bivalves in the family Astartidae
- Goodallia (plant), a genus of plants in the family Thymelaeaceae
- Goodallia, an extinct genus of bivalves in the family Ungulinidae, synonym of Microstagon
