= Aetoxylon =

Scientific classification
- Kingdom: Plantae
- Clade: Tracheophytes
- Clade: Angiosperms
- Clade: Eudicots
- Clade: Rosids
- Order: Malvales
- Family: Thymelaeaceae
- Subfamily: Octolepidoideae
- Genus: Aetoxylon; Airy Shaw
- Species: A. sympetalum

Binomial name
- Aetoxylon sympetalum (Steenis & Domke) Airy Shaw

Genus of trees

Aetoxylon is a single species genus (monotypic) of trees only found (endemic) in Borneo, of the flowering plant family Thymelaeaceae. The single species is Aetoxylon sympetalum, commonly known as gaharu buaya or crocodile eaglewood.

Aetoxylon sympetalum grows as a tree up to 40 metres (130 ft) tall, with a trunk diameter of up to 60 centimetres (24 in). Bark is dark brown to black. Fruit is reddish brown, up to 5 centimetres (2.0 in) in diameter. The specific epithet sympetalum is from the Latin meaning "united petals". Habitat is lowland forests from sea level to 100 metres (330 ft) altitude.
