= Solmsia =

Scientific classification
- Kingdom: Plantae
- Clade: Tracheophytes
- Clade: Angiosperms
- Clade: Eudicots
- Clade: Rosids
- Order: Malvales
- Family: Thymelaeaceae
- Genus: Solmsia; Baill. (1871)
- Species: S. calophylla

Binomial name
- Solmsia calophylla Baill. (1871)

Synonyms
- Microsemma calophylla Guillaumin & MacKee (1959); Solmsia calophylla var. chrysophylla (Baill.) Guill. (1911); Solmsia chrysophylla Baill. (1871)

Genus of flowering plants

Solmsia is a genus of flowering plants belonging to the family Thymelaeaceae. It includes a single species, Solmsia calophylla, a shrub or tree endemic to New Caledonia. The genus was named to honor Hermann zu Solms-Laubach by Henri Ernest Baillon. It is related to Arnhemia, Deltaria, Gonystylus and Lethedon.
