= Lophostoma (plant) =

Scientific classification
- Kingdom: Plantae
- Clade: Tracheophytes
- Clade: Angiosperms
- Clade: Eudicots
- Clade: Rosids
- Order: Malvales
- Family: Thymelaeaceae
- Subfamily: Thymelaeoideae
- Genus: Lophostoma; Meisn. (1855)

Species
- Lophostoma amoenum Nevling; Lophostoma calophylloides (Meisn.) Meisn.; Lophostoma dinizii Huber ex Ducke; Lophostoma ovatum Meisn.

Genus of flowering plants

Lophostoma is a genus of flowering plants in the family Thymelaeaceae. It includes four species native to tropical northern South America, ranging from Colombia to Venezuela and northern Brazil.

== Species ==
Four species are accepted.

- Lophostoma amoenum Nevling
- Lophostoma calophylloides (Meisn.) Meisn.
- Lophostoma dinizii Huber ex Ducke
- Lophostoma ovatum Meisn.
