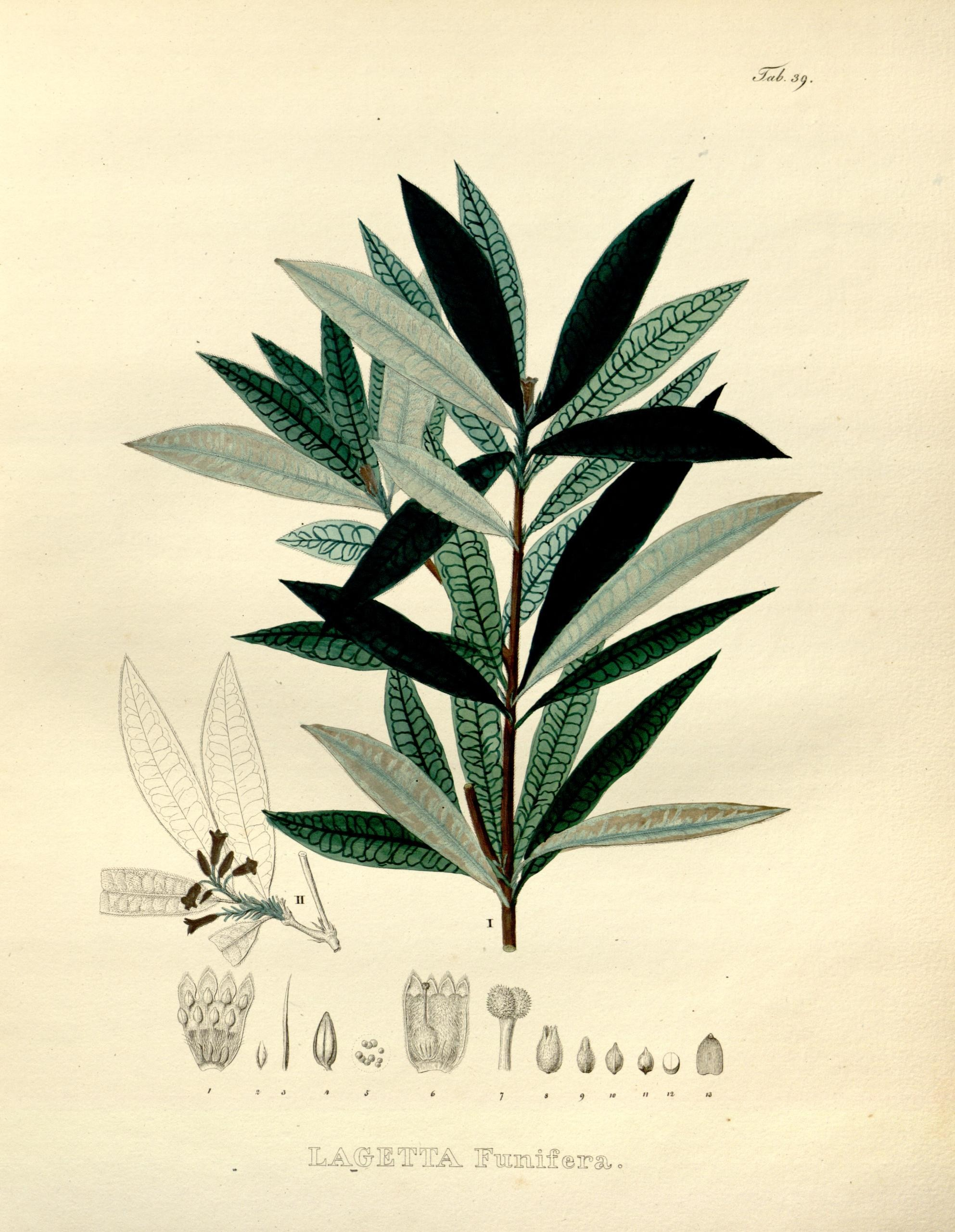
- Funifera brasiliensis botanical illustration

Scientific classification
- Kingdom: Plantae
- Clade: Embryophytes
- Clade: Tracheophytes
- Clade: Angiosperms
- Clade: Eudicots
- Clade: Rosids
- Order: Malvales
- Family: Thymelaeaceae
- Subfamily: Thymelaeoideae
- Tribe: Daphneae
- Genus: Funifera; Andrews ex C.A.Mey. (1843)

Species
- 4; see text

= Funifera =

Genus of flowering plants

Funifera is a genus of flowering plants in the family Thymelaeaceae, with all species endemic to Brazil.

== Species ==
Four species are currently accepted.

- Funifera brasiliensis (Raddi) Mansf.
- Funifera ericiflora (Gilg & Markgr.) Domke
- Funifera grandifolia Domke
- Funifera insulae Nevling
