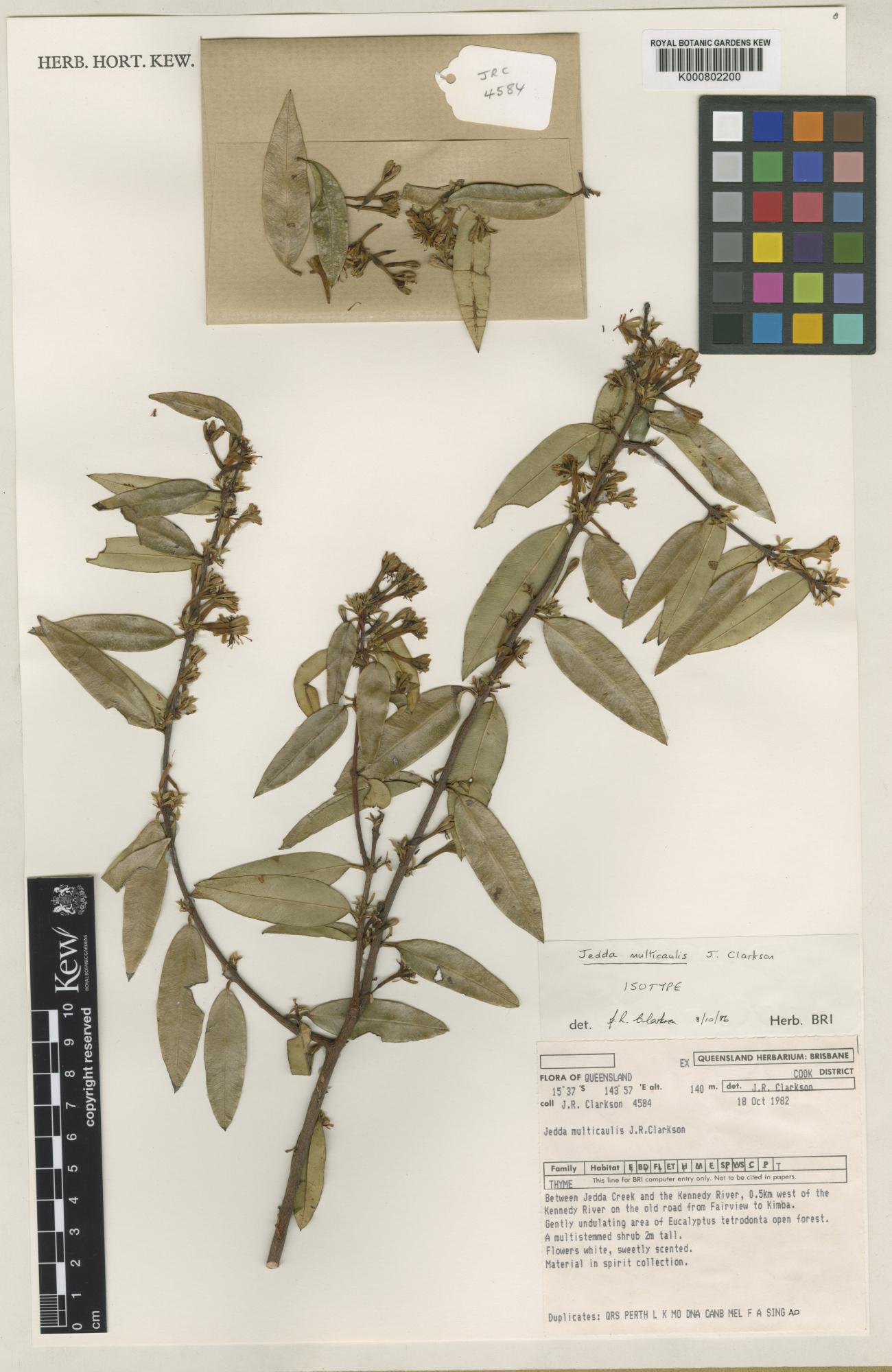

Scientific classification
- Kingdom: Plantae
- Clade: Tracheophytes
- Clade: Angiosperms
- Clade: Eudicots
- Clade: Rosids
- Order: Malvales
- Family: Thymelaeaceae
- Subfamily: Thymelaeoideae
- Genus: Jedda; J.R.Clarkson
- Species: J. multicaulis

Binomial name
- Jedda multicaulis J.R.Clarkson

= Jedda multicaulis =

Species of flowering plant

Jedda is a monotypic plant genus in the Thymelaeaceae family, its only species being Jedda multicaulis. The species is an upright, evergreen bush indigenous to tropical Australia, discovered in the early 1980s on the Cape York Peninsula in northern Queensland, in an area of grassy forest land. The full extent of its distribution is unknown. The name Jedda is a toponym from Jedda Creek, which is close to where the type specimen was collected from.

== Description ==
Jedda multicaulis is a multi-stemmed, upright, evergreen bush (1.5–2.5 m tall). Stems, which are smooth, reddish-brown, and cylindrical when young, and woody as they age, arise from a central corm. Glabrous, coriaceous, point-tipped, oval-shaped leaves (2.5–7 mm long × 8–25 mm wide), are arranged oppositely, or nearly oppositely, along the stems. Inflorescences (2–4 mm long) are clusters of usually three, occasionally up to five flowers, set in bracts. Flower base is tubular (7–9 mm long), extending into sepals and white corolla lobes (3.8–5 mm long). Flowers come out in October. Fruits (6–8 cm long × 4–6 cm wide) which are sometimes viviparous and exhibit cryptogeal (i.e. plant burrows under the soil) germination, are green leathery berries or achenes.
