= Amyxa =

Scientific classification
- Kingdom: Plantae
- Clade: Tracheophytes
- Clade: Angiosperms
- Clade: Eudicots
- Clade: Rosids
- Order: Malvales
- Family: Thymelaeaceae
- Genus: Amyxa; Tiegh.
- Species: A. pluricornis

Binomial name
- Amyxa pluricornis (Radlk.) Domke

Genus of flowering plants

Amyxa is a genus of flowering plants belonging to the family Thymelaeaceae. The only species is Amyxa pluricornis.

Its native range is Borneo.
