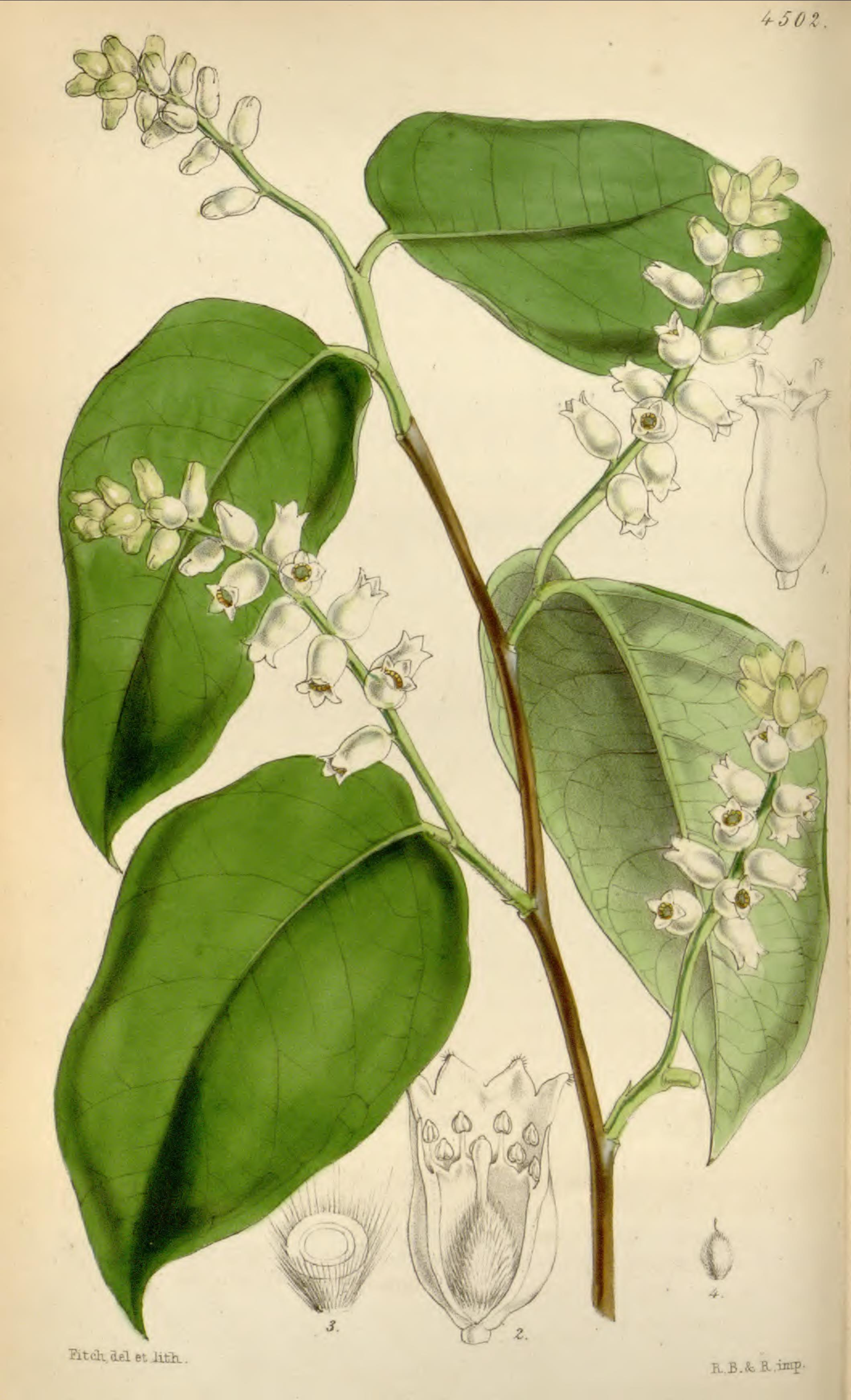
- Lagetta lagetto

Scientific classification
- Kingdom: Plantae
- Clade: Tracheophytes
- Clade: Angiosperms
- Clade: Eudicots
- Clade: Rosids
- Order: Malvales
- Family: Thymelaeaceae
- Subfamily: Thymelaeoideae
- Genus: Lagetta; Juss. (1789)

= Lagetta =

Genus of flowering plants

Lagetta is a genus of trees in the family Thymelaeaceae. It was described by Antoine Laurent de Jussieu, and was published in 1789 by Jean-Baptiste Lamarck. It is found on the Caribbean islands.

== Species ==
Three species are accepted.

- Lagetta lagetto (Sw.) Nash
- Lagetta valenzuelana A.Rich.
- Lagetta wrightiana Krug & Urb.
