= Daphnimorpha =

Scientific classification
- Kingdom: Plantae
- Clade: Tracheophytes
- Clade: Angiosperms
- Clade: Eudicots
- Clade: Rosids
- Order: Malvales
- Family: Thymelaeaceae
- Genus: Daphnimorpha; Nakai (1937)

Genus of flowering plants

Daphnimorpha is a genus of flowering plants belonging to the family Thymelaeaceae.

Its native range is southern Japan.

Species:

- Daphnimorpha capitellata (H.Hara) Nakai
- Daphnimorpha kudoi (Makino) Nakai
