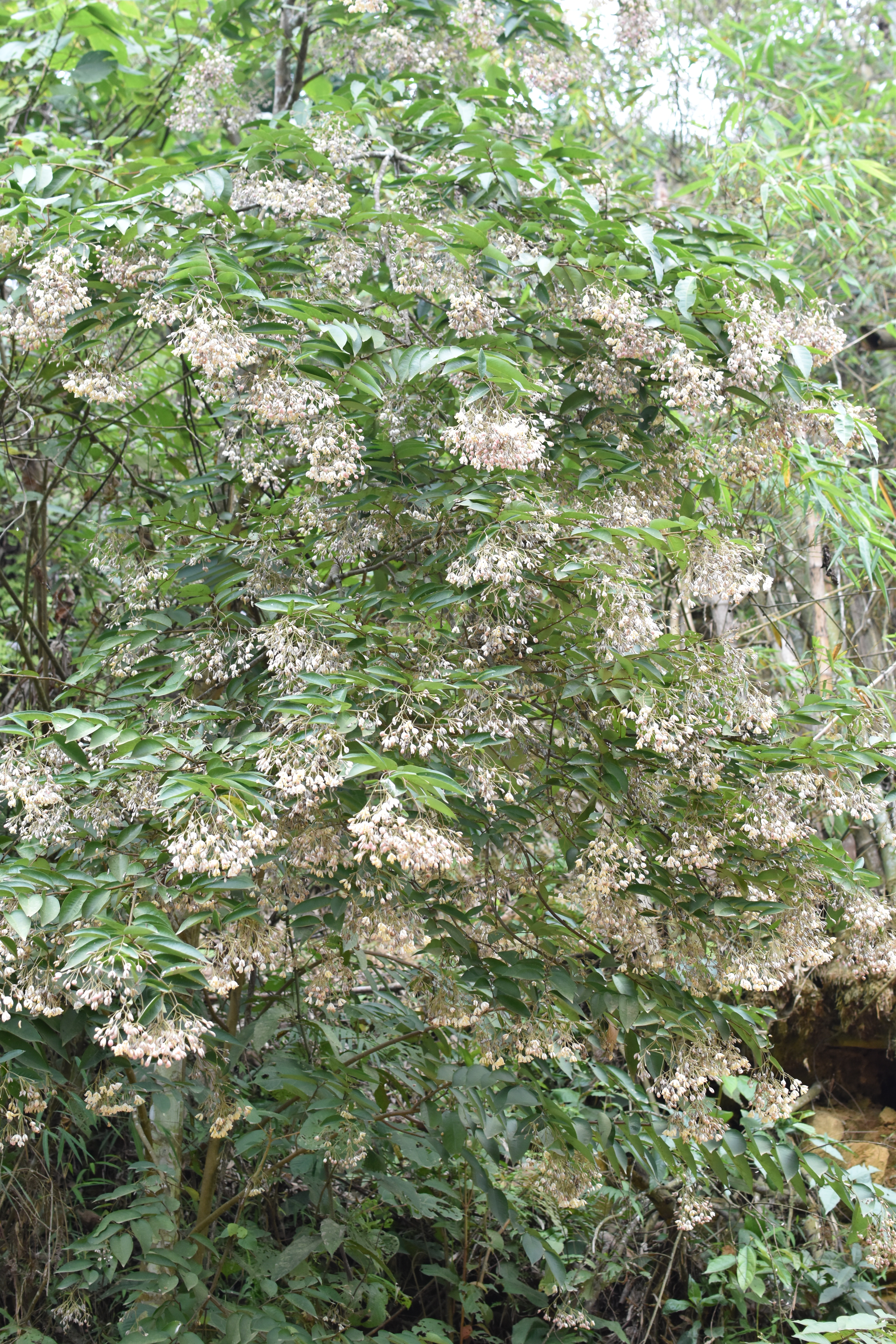
- Mature tree, Đà Bắc District, Hòa Bình Province, Vietnam

Scientific classification
- Kingdom: Plantae
- Clade: Tracheophytes
- Clade: Angiosperms
- Clade: Eudicots
- Clade: Rosids
- Order: Malvales
- Family: Thymelaeaceae
- Subfamily: Thymelaeoideae
- Genus: Rhamnoneuron; Gilg (1894)
- Species: R. balansae

Binomial name
- Rhamnoneuron balansae (Maury) Gilg (1894)

Synonyms
- Daphne balansae (Maury) Halda (1999); Daphne rubriflora (C.Y.Wu ex S.C.Huang) Halda (1999); Rhamnoneuron rubriflorum C.Y.Wu ex S.C.Huang (1985); Wikstroemia balansae Maury (1889)

= Rhamnoneuron =

Genus of plants

Rhamnoneuron balansae is a species of small tree belonging to the family Thymelaeaceae; it is the only species in the genus Rhamnoneuron. It is native to southeastern Yunnan and northern Vietnam. In Bac Ninh province, its bast is harvested to make dó paper.

== Description ==
The shrub or small tree that grows to between 2 and 4 m tall. Its branchlets are erect, brown, and slender. It is often found in forests at elevations of 900 to 1200 m.
