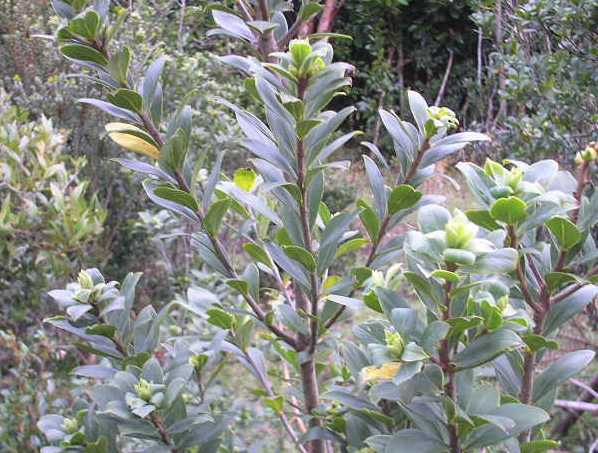
- Ovidia pillopillo

Scientific classification
- Kingdom: Plantae
- Clade: Tracheophytes
- Clade: Angiosperms
- Clade: Eudicots
- Clade: Rosids
- Order: Malvales
- Family: Thymelaeaceae
- Subfamily: Thymelaeoideae
- Genus: Ovidia; Meisn.

= Ovidia =

Genus of flowering plants

Ovidia Meisn. is a genus of plants in the family Thymelaeaceae native to Bolivia and southern South America. (Ovidia Raf. is a synonym for Commelina.)

As of September 2024, Plants of the World Online accepts two species:

- Ovidia andina (Poepp. & Endl.) Meisn. (synonym O. pillopillo (Gay) Meisn.) – southern Argentina and southern Chile
- Ovidia sericea Antezana & Z.S.Rogers – Bolivia

== Alleged use as entheogen ==
O. pillopillo has been claimed to be 'one of the four major hallucinogens’ used by the Mapuche of Chile. The other three plant species involved are drawn from a list including Latua pubiflora, Desfontainia spinosa, Drimys winteri, Lobelia tupa and Datura stramonium. The specific name pillopillo is one of the common names for the plant in the Mapudungun language - another of which is Lloime - while a Spanish common name Palo hediondo ("Stinking tree") apparently refers to the unpleasant smell of the foliage. Chilefora records the plant as being "poisonous" (without further detail) - a far from uncommon property in the Thymelaeaceae, a predominantly Southern Hemisphere plant family containing many species used to manufacture paper and cordage and likewise many toxic species with violently purgative properties, though few yet known to be psychoactive. Neither Claude Gay's original description of the plant (as Daphne pillopillo), nor Murillo's oft-quoted account in his classic work on the medicinal plants of Chile make any mention of any effects of Ovidia pillopillo on the CNS, both of which suggest that Rätsch may be in error claiming the plant to be hallucinogenic (although this by no means rules out a role for the plant of some other kind in Mapuche ritual).
