= Eriosolena =

Scientific classification
- Kingdom: Plantae
- Clade: Tracheophytes
- Clade: Angiosperms
- Clade: Eudicots
- Clade: Rosids
- Order: Malvales
- Family: Thymelaeaceae
- Genus: Eriosolena; Blume (1826)

Synonyms
- Scopolia L.f. (1782), nom. illeg.

Genus of plants

Eriosolena is a genus of flowering plants belonging to the family Thymelaeaceae.

Its native range is Eastern Himalaya to south-central China and Western Malesia.

Species:

- Eriosolena composita (L.f.) Tiegh.
- Eriosolena involucrata (Wall.) Tiegh.
