= Atemnosiphon =

Conservation status
- Least Concern (IUCN 3.1)

Scientific classification
- Kingdom: Plantae
- Clade: Tracheophytes
- Clade: Angiosperms
- Clade: Eudicots
- Clade: Rosids
- Order: Malvales
- Family: Thymelaeaceae
- Genus: Atemnosiphon; Leandri (1947)
- Species: A. coriaceus

Binomial name
- Atemnosiphon coriaceus (Leandri) Leandri (1947)

Synonyms
- Lasiosiphon coriaceus Leandri (1929)

Genus of flowering plants

Atemnosiphon is a genus of flowering plants belonging to the family Thymelaeaceae. It includes a single species, Atemnosiphon coriaceus, a shrub endemic to Madagascar.
