= Octolepis =

Scientific classification
- Kingdom: Plantae
- Clade: Tracheophytes
- Clade: Angiosperms
- Clade: Eudicots
- Clade: Rosids
- Order: Malvales
- Family: Thymelaeaceae
- Genus: Octolepis; Oliv. (1865)

Synonyms
- Makokoa Baill. (1886)

Genus of plants

Octolepis is a genus of flowering plants belonging to the family Thymelaeaceae.

Its native range is western and west-central tropical Africa and Madagascar.

== Species ==
Seven species are accepted.

- Octolepis aymoniniana Z.S.Rogers
- Octolepis casearia Oliv.
- Octolepis decalepis Gilg
- Octolepis dioica Capuron
- Octolepis ibityensis Z.S.Rogers
- Octolepis oblanceolata (Capuron) Z.S.Rogers
- Octolepis ratovosonii Z.S.Rogers
