= Tepuianthus =

Scientific classification
- Kingdom: Plantae
- Clade: Tracheophytes
- Clade: Angiosperms
- Clade: Eudicots
- Clade: Rosids
- Order: Malvales
- Family: Thymelaeaceae
- Genus: Tepuianthus; Maguire & Steyerm. (1981)

Genus of flowering plants

Tepuianthus is a genus of flowering plants belonging to the family Thymelaeaceae.

Its native range is Venezuela, Northern Brazil and Colombia.

Species:

- Tepuianthus aracensis Steyerm. & Maguire
- Tepuianthus auyantepuiensis Maguire & Steyerm.
- Tepuianthus colombianus Maguire & Steyerm.
- Tepuianthus sarisarinamensis Maguire & Steyerm.
- Tepuianthus savannensis Maguire & Steyerm.
- Tepuianthus yapacanensis Maguire & Steyerm.
