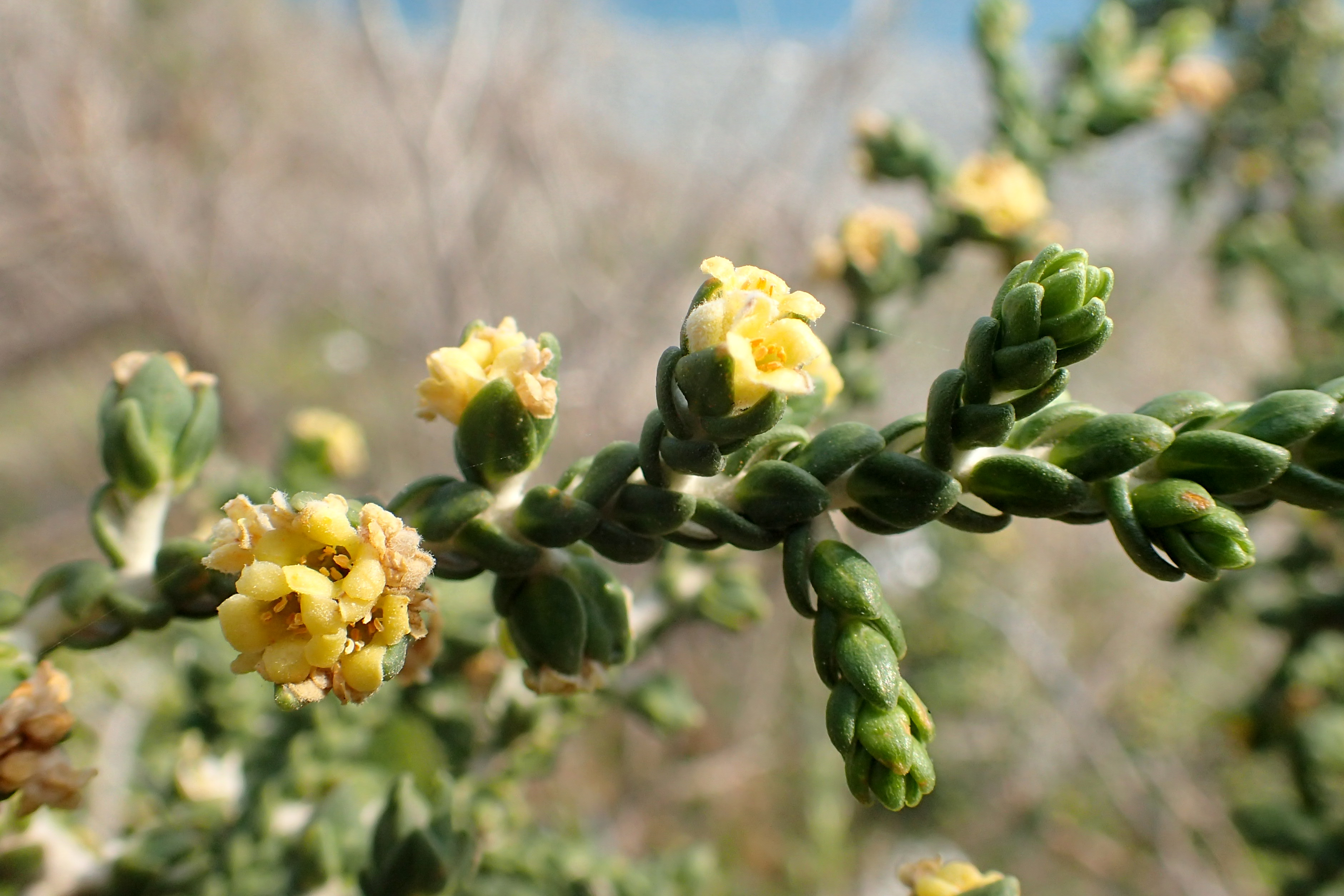
- Thymelaea hirsuta

Scientific classification
- Kingdom: Plantae
- Clade: Tracheophytes
- Clade: Angiosperms
- Clade: Eudicots
- Clade: Rosids
- Order: Malvales
- Family: Thymelaeaceae; Juss.

Genera
- See text

= Thymelaeaceae =

Family of flowering plants

The Thymelaeaceae /ˌθɪmɪliːˈeɪsiː, -siˌaɪ/ are a cosmopolitan family of flowering plants composed of 50 genera (listed below) and 898 species. It was established in 1789 by Antoine Laurent de Jussieu. The Thymelaeaceae are mostly trees and shrubs, with a few vines and herbaceous plants, the latter including some annual species.

== Description ==
Several conspicuous or unusual traits are characteristic of the family (when Tepuianthus is excluded). The bark is usually shiny and fibrous, with strips of bark peeling down the side of broken stems. The number of stamens is usually once or twice the number of calyx lobes; when twice, they often occur in two well separated series. Exceptions include Gonystylus, which may have up to 100 stamens, and Pimelea, which has only 1 or 2.

Thymelaeaceae are often difficult to identify because of equivocal interpretation of the flower parts. Sepals, petals, and staminodes are hard to distinguish, and many keys are ambiguous about whether staminodes should be counted as stamens. Moreover, in Wikstroemia, individual plants often produce anomalous flowers.

== Taxonomy ==
The family is named from the genus Thymelaea, the name of which is a combination of the Greek name for the herb thyme θύμος (thúmos) and that for the olive ἐλαία (elaía)—in reference to its thyme-like foliage (i.e. minuscule leaves) and olive-like fruit.

=== Classification ===
The Thymelaeaceae are in the order Malvales. Except for a sister relationship with Tepuianthaceae, little is known for sure about their relationships with the other families in the order.

Unlike most recent authors, who accept four subfamilies, B. E. Herber has divided Thymelaeaceae into two subfamilies. He has retained the subfamily Gonostyloideae, but renamed it Octolepidoideae. The other three traditional subfamilies (Synandrodaphnoideae, Aquilarioideae, and Thymelaeoideae) were combined into a Thymelaeoideae s.l.(sensu lato), and reduced to tribal rank, as Synandrodaphneae, Aquilarieae, and Daphneae, respectively. No tribes were designated in subfamily Octolepidoideae, but it was provisionally divided into two informal groups, the Octolepis group and the Gonystylus group. Likewise, no subtribes were designated in the tribe Daphneae, but it was informally divided into four groups: the Linostoma group, the Daphne group, the Phaleria group, and the Gnidia group. The 45 genera accepted by Herber are grouped as follows. Three genera in Daphneae were placed incertae sedis (not assigned to any particular group or in a separate group by themselves).

==== Octolepidoideae ====
Octolepis group: Arnhemia, Deltaria, Lethedon, Octolepis, Solmsia
Gonystylus group: Aetoxylon, Amyxa, Gonystylus

==== Thymelaeoideae ====
Synandrodaphneae: Synandrodaphne
Aquilarieae: Aquilaria, Gyrinops
Daphneae

Linostoma group: Craterosiphon, Dicranolepis, Enkleia, Jedda, Linostoma, Lophostoma, Synaptolepis
Phaleria group: Peddiea, Phaleria
Daphne group: Daphne, Daphnopsis, Diarthron, Dirca, Edgeworthia, Funifera, Goodallia, Lagetta, Ovidia, Rhamnoneuron, Schoenobiblus, Stellera, Thymelaea, Wikstroemia
Gnidia group: Dais, Drapetes, Gnidia, Kelleria, Lachnaea, Passerina, Pimelea, Struthiola
Incertae sedis: Linodendron, Stephanodaphne, Lasiadenia

=== Phylogeny ===
The first molecular phylogeny for Thymelaeaceae was published in 2002. It was based on two regions of chloroplast DNA. These were the rbcL gene and the intergenic spacer between the transfer RNA genes trnL and trnF. Forty one species in the family were sampled. In 2008, Marline Rautenbach performed a phylogenetic study in which 143 species in the family were sampled. The sampling in this study was concentrated in the Gnidia group, but the sampling in the rest of the family was as extensive as in the previous study, or more so. In addition to rbcL and trnL-F data, sequences of the ITS (internal transcribed spacer) region of nrDNA (nuclear ribosomal DNA) were used. All of the clades that were strongly supported in the previous study were recovered with even stronger statistical support.

The tree below is an excerpt from the Rautenbach (2002) phylogeny. The species of Gnidia were chosen from among the most common or well known species in a way that shows which clades contain species of Gnidia.

- - Octolepis
- - Gonystylus
  - Lethedon
  - Deltaria
  - Solmsia
  - Arnhemia
- Thymelaeoideae
  - Synandrodaphneae
    Synandrodaphne
  - - Aquilarieae
      - Aquilaria
      - Gyrinops
    - Daphneae
      - Linostoma group
        - Dicranolepis
        - - Enkleia
          - - Synaptolepis
            - Craterosiphon
      - - Daphne group
          - Edgeworthia
          - - - Wikstroemia gemmata
              - - Wikstroemia canescens
                - Stellera
            - - Diarthron
              - - Daphne
                - Thymelaea
        - - Phaleria group
            - Phaleria
            - Dais
          - Gnidia group
            - - Gnidia glauca
              - - Gnidia kraussiana
                - Gnidia calocephala
            - Stephanodaphne
            - - Dirca
              - Ovidia
            - Peddiea
            - - Gnidia humilis
              - - Gnidia squarrosa
                - - Gnidia pilosa
                  - Pimelea
            - - - Gnidia racemosa
                - - Gnidia pinifolia
                  - Struthiola
              - - Lachnaea
                - Passerina
                - - Drapetes
                  - Gnidia anomala

=== Defining the genera ===
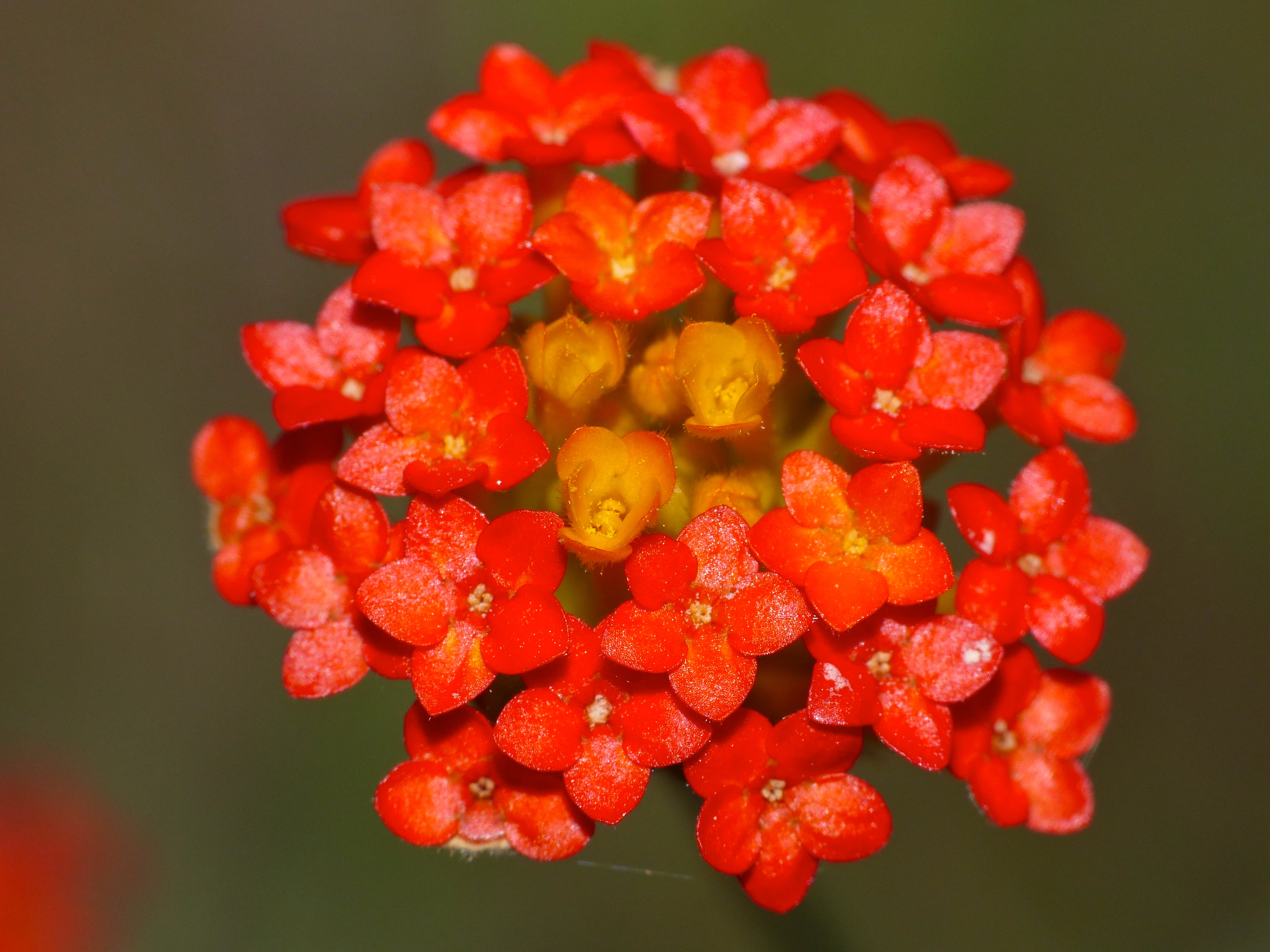
The striking flowers of Gnidia rubescens

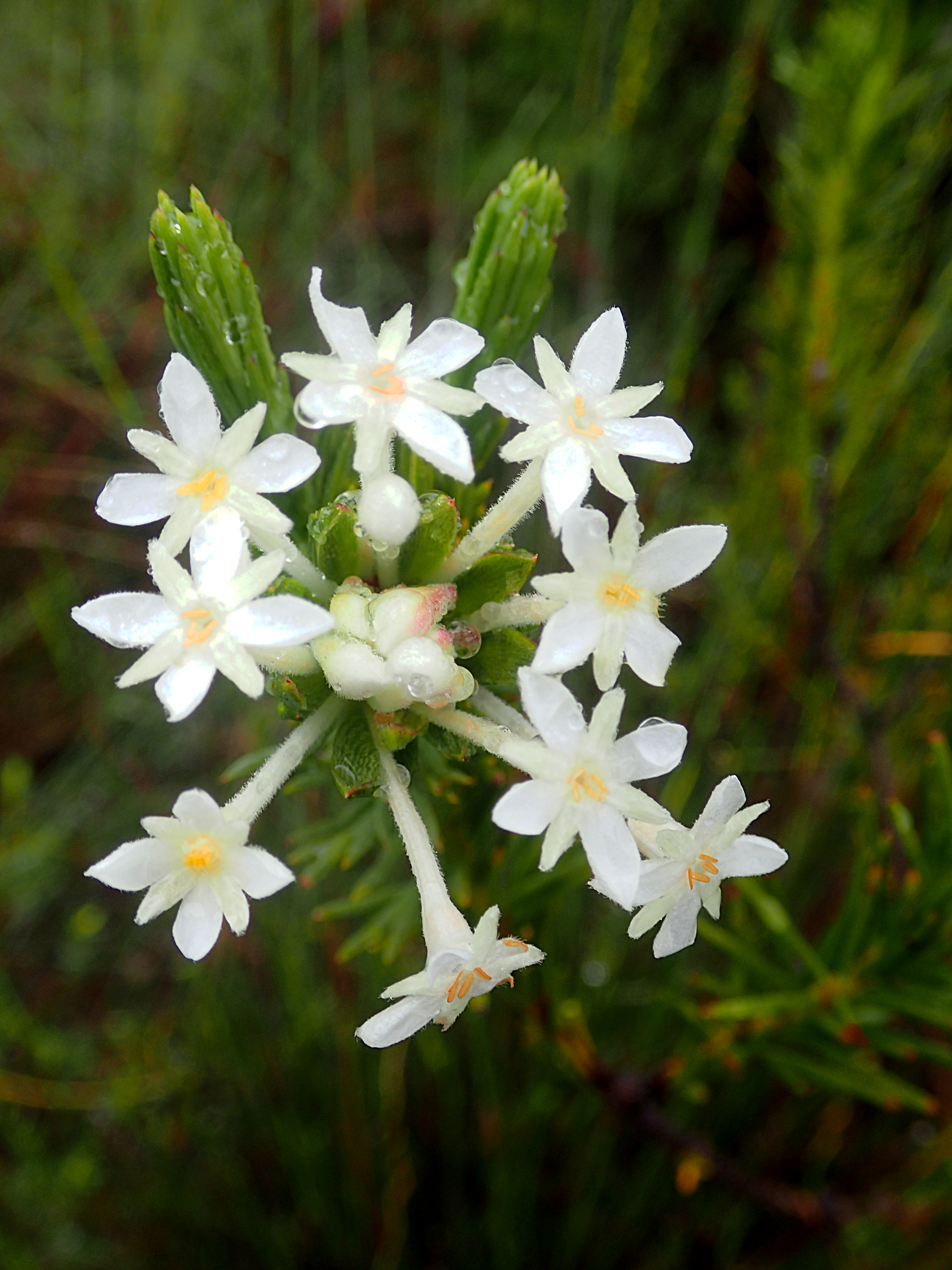
Gnidia pinifolia in bloom

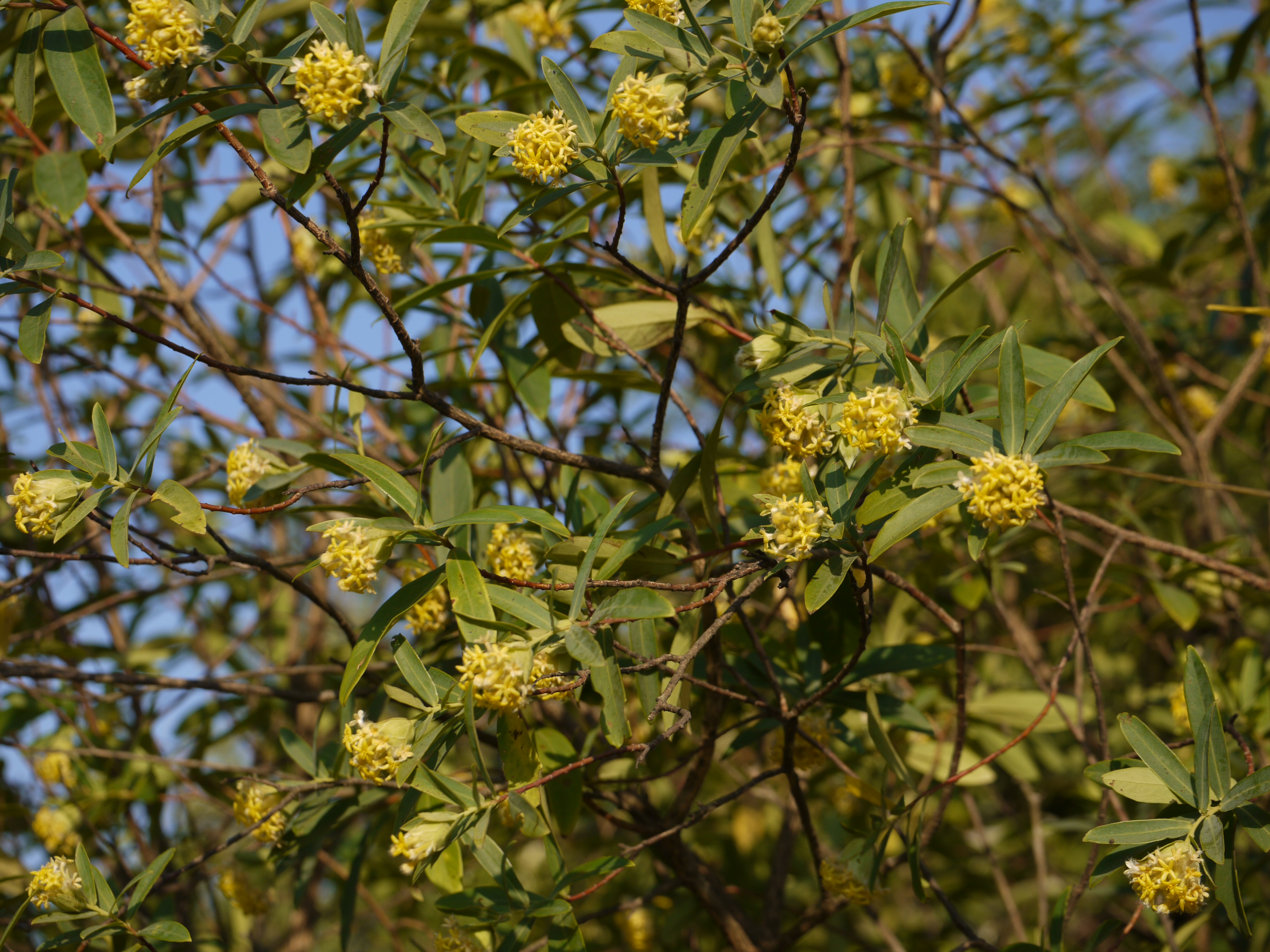
Gnidia glauca (known formerly as Lasiosiphon glaucus)

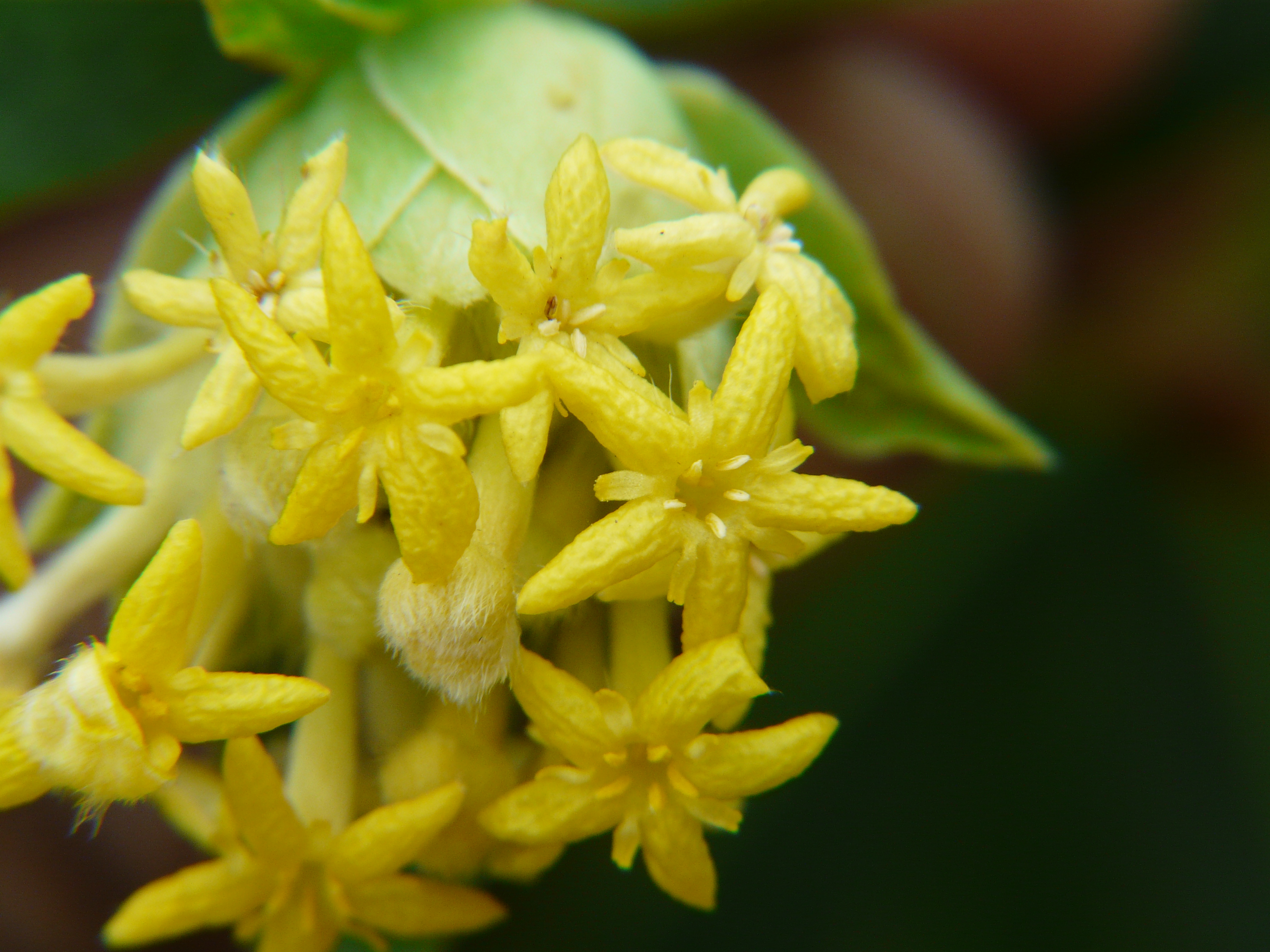
Detail of flowers of Gnidia glauca (known formerly as Lasiosiphon glaucus)

The circumscription of genera in Thymelaeaceae has always been difficult, and is to some degree artificial. For example, the difficulty of distinguishing Daphne from Wikstroemia has been commented upon by Rautenbach and Herber. Several small genera are probably embedded in Daphne or Wikstroemia, or if Daphne and Wikstroemia are intermingled, these small genera might be embedded in both simultaneously. Stellera, for example, is nested within Wikstroemia, at least (see the phylogenetic tree below).

A recent comparison of DNA sequences has established the monophyly of Thymelaea and the polyphyly of Diarthron, but there was not sufficient sampling in Wikstroemia and Daphne to exclude the possibility that Thymelaea, Diarthron, and others might be embedded in them.

The large genus Gnidia is polyphyletic and its species fall into four separate clades, each of which contains other genera of the family (see the phylogenetic tree below). The type species for Gnidia is Gnidia pinifolia. If Gnidia is divided into four or more separate genera, the segregate genus which contains G. pinifolia will retain the name Gnidia. Zachary S. Rogers published a revision of the Gnidia of Madagascar in 2009 in Annals of the Missouri Botanical Garden.

Some of the older treatments of Thymelaeaceae treat Lasiosiphon as a separate genus from Gnidia. This distinction was later shown to be artificial. However, Van der Bank et al. (2002) suggested that Lasiosiphon might be resurrected if redefined. The type species for Lasiosiphon is Gnidia glauca, formerly known as Lasiosiphon glaucus.

=== Open questions ===
Rautenbach used different names from Herber for some of the groups and placed some of the groups at different taxonomic rank, but her phylogeny supports Herber's classification with the few exceptions noted below. The only strongly supported difference (99% (bootstrap percentage) from Herber's classification was that Dais was found to be sister to Phaleria. The phylogeny casts significant doubt upon the monophyly of the subfamily Octolepidoideae, and upon the monophyly of the informal Octolepis and Gonostylus groups, but this result had only weak statistical support. Only a sampling of more species and more DNA from each will determine whether these groups are monophyletic or not. Stephanodaphne and Peddiea might need to be transferred to the Gnidia group, but support was not strong (60% BP) for a clade consisting of the Gnidia group with Stephanodaphne and Peddiea. Again, more extensive sampling will be required to resolve this question. Two of the three genera placed incertae sedis by Herber (Linodendron and Lasiadenia) have not yet been sampled and their relationships to other genera remain obscure.

=== Genera ===
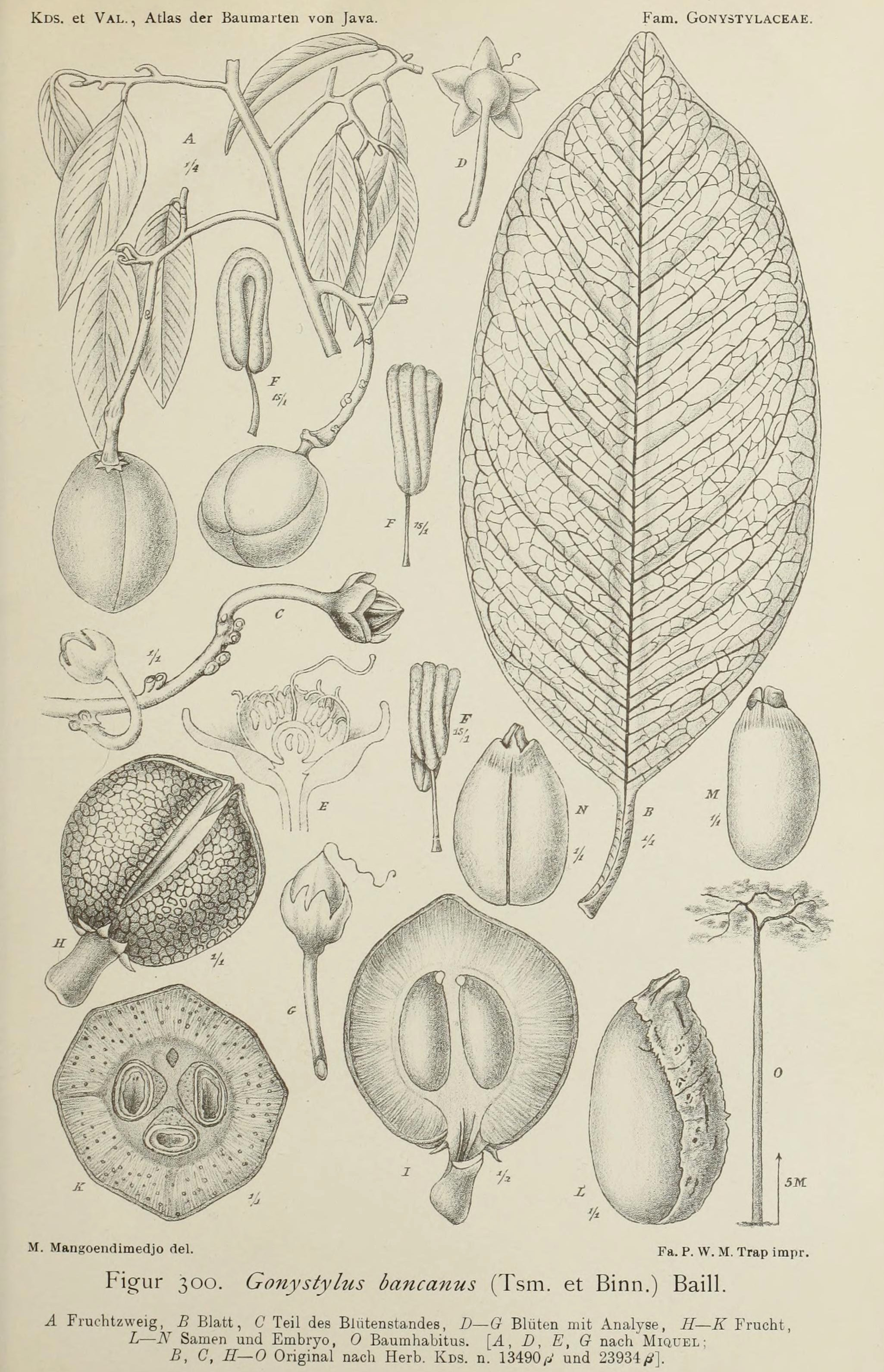
Gonystylus bancanus native to Brunei, Indonesia, and Malaysia: botanical line drawing of detailed anatomy

Herber (2003) accepts 45 genera, excluding Tepuianthus from the family, sinking Atemnosiphon and Englerodaphne into Gnidia, Eriosolena into Daphne, and Thecanthes into Pimelea. The largest genera and the approximate number of species in each are Gnidia (160), Pimelea (110), Daphne (95), Wikstroemia (70), Daphnopsis (65), Struthiola (35), Lachnaea (30), Thymelaea (30), Phaleria (30), and Gonystylus (25).

As of September 2024, Plants of the World Online accepts 52 genera.

- Aetoxylon (Airy Shaw) Airy Shaw
- Amyxa Tiegh.
- Aquilaria Lam.
- Arnhemia Airy Shaw
- Atemnosiphon Leandri
- Craterosiphon Engl. & Gilg.
- Dais D.Royen ex L.
- Daphne Tourn. ex L.
- Daphnimorpha Nakai
- Daphnopsis Mart.
- Deltaria Steenis
- Diarthron Turcz.
- Dicranolepis Planch.
- Dirca L.
- Drapetes Banks ex Lam.
- Edgeworthia Meisn.
- Englerodaphne Gilg
- Enkleia Griff.
- Eriosolena Blume
- Funifera Andrews ex C.A.Mey.
- Gnidia L.
- Gonystylus Teijsm. & Binn.
- Goodallia Benth.
- Gyrinops Gaertn.
- Jedda J.R.Clarkson
- Kelleria Endl.
- Lachnaea L.
- Lagetta Juss.
- Lasiadenia Benth.
- Lethedon Biehler
- Linodendron Griseb.
- Linostoma Wall. ex Endl.
- Lophostoma Meisn.
- Octolepis Oliv.
- Ovidia Meisn.
- Passerina L.
- Peddiea Harv.
- Phaleria Jack
- Pimelea Banks ex Gaertn.
- Restella Pobed.
- Rhamnoneuron Gilg
- Schoenobiblus Mart.
- Solmsia Baill.
- Stellera L.
- Stephanodaphne Baill.
- Struthiola L.
- Synandrodaphne Gilg
- Synaptolepis Oliv.
- Tepuianthus Maguire & Steyerm.
- Thymelaea Mill.
- Wikstroemia Endl.

In the past, different authors have defined Thymelaeaceae in different ways. For example, John Hutchinson excluded Gonystylus and its close relatives, as well as Aquilaria and its close relatives from the family, forming two segregate families, Gonystylaceae and Aquilariaceae. But today, the only controversy that still remains over the circumscription of the family is the question of whether Tepuianthus should be included, or segregated as a separate, monogeneric family. Stevens includes Tepuianthus, but Kubitzki treats Tepuianthaceae as a separate family.

== Distribution ==
The family is more diverse in the Southern Hemisphere than in the Northern, with major concentrations of species in Africa and Australia. The genera are overwhelmingly African.

== Ethnobotany and economic use ==
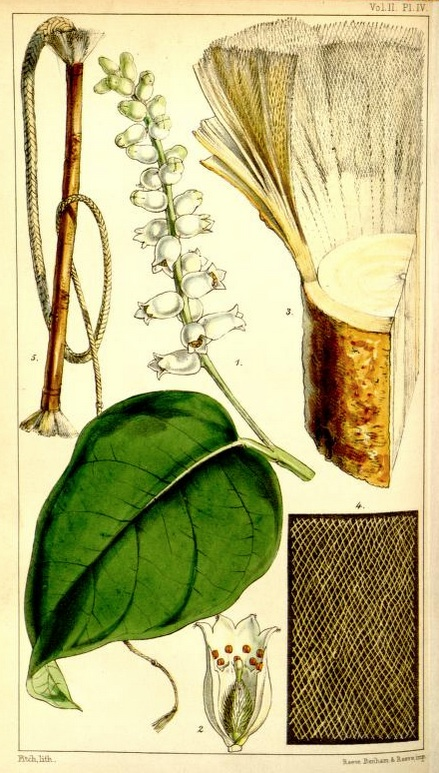
Lagetta lagetto the "lacebark": botanical illustration showing plant with samples of cordage and fabric made from its fibre

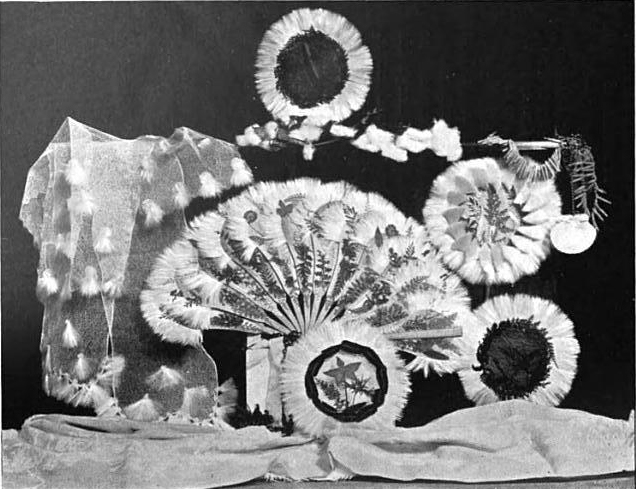
Intricate Jamaican souvenirs woven from "lacebark" fibre

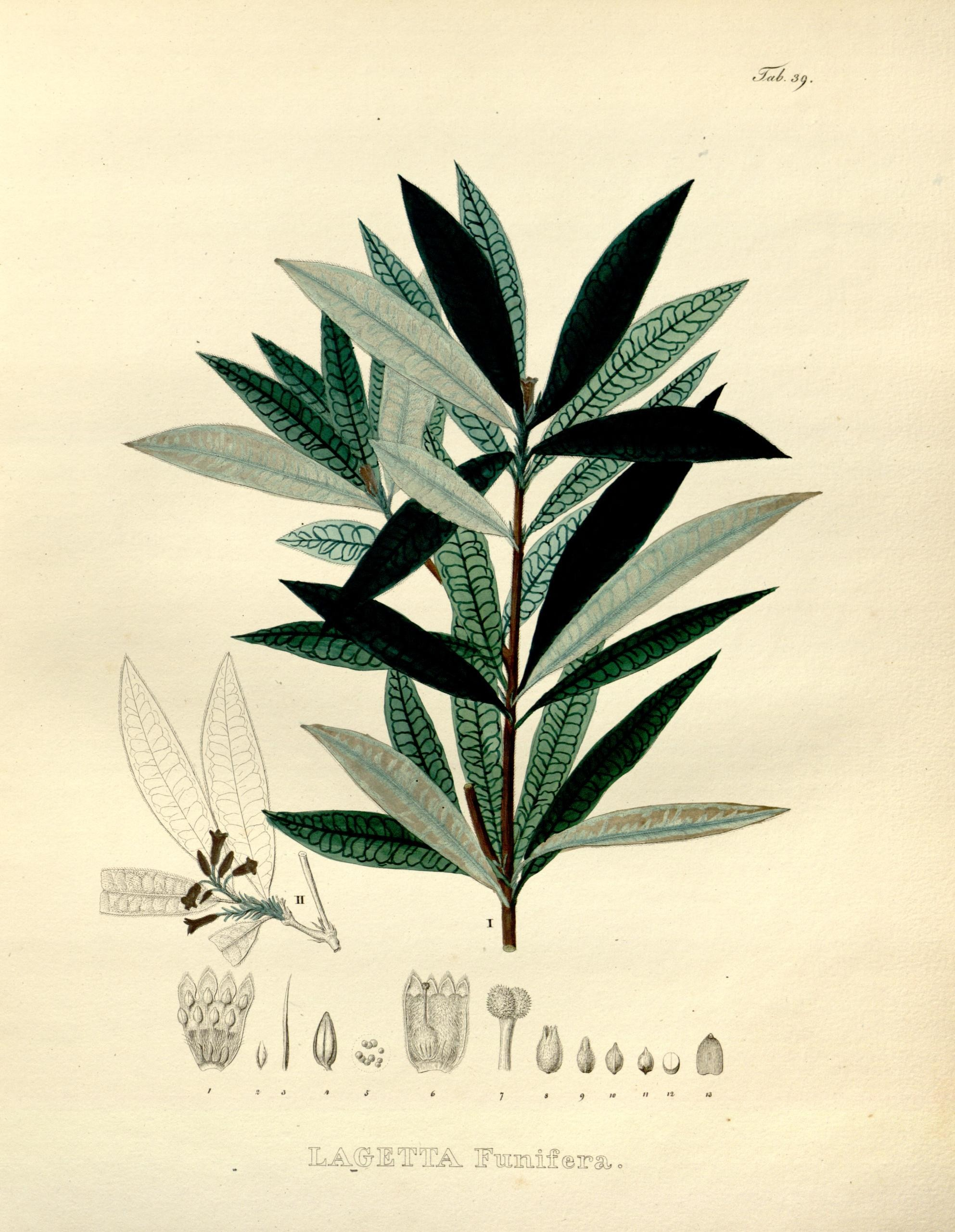
The Brazilian Funifera utilis, its genus named from the suitability of its fibre for rope-making (under the obsolete name Lagetta funifera)

Several genera are of economic importance. Gonystylus (ramin) is valued for its comparatively soft, easily worked yellowish wood, but trade in all species in the genus is controlled by CITES. Many genera have inner bark yielding strong fibre suitable for the making of cordage and paper, a fact acknowledged in the naming of one of the genera, Funifera meaning the Latin for "bearer (provider) of rope". The bark of Aquilaria, Daphne, Edgeworthia, Gnidia, Linostoma, Rhamnoneuron, Thymelaea, Stellera, and Wikstroemia are used in paper-making, while Lagetta was once harvested as a source of natural lace for making doilies and trimmings for luxury garments.

== Toxicity and medicinal uses ==
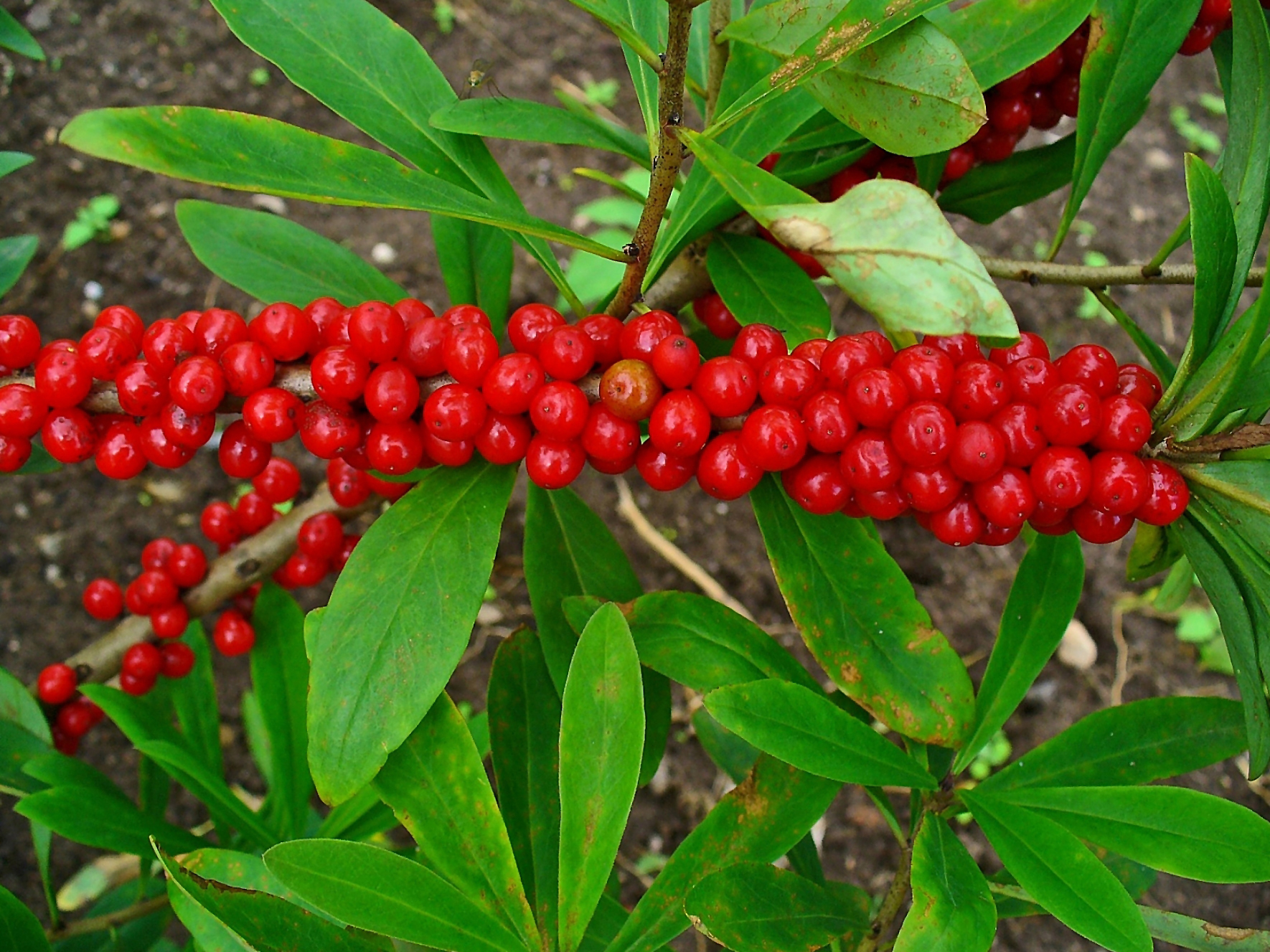
The attractive, but poisonous, fruit of Daphne mezereum

Many of the species (e.g. Wikstroemia indica and Stellera chamaejasme) have actual or potential uses in medicine and are poisonous if eaten, acting as violent purges (e.g. Daphne mezereum). This toxicity is often related to the plants' containing phorbol esters which, as the name suggests, are also common in the spurge family Euphorbiaceae.

== Use as ornamental plants ==
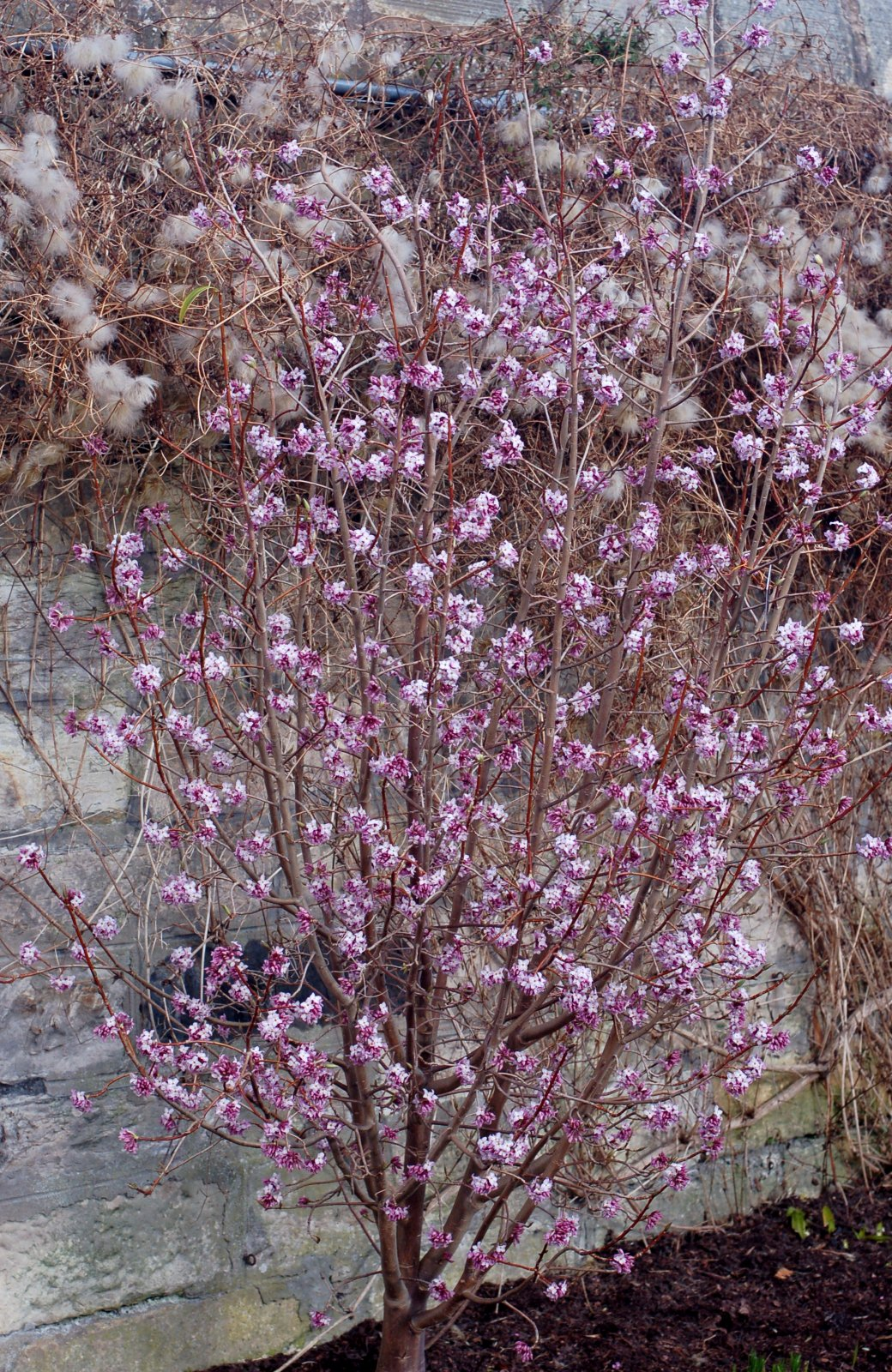
The sweetly-scented and highly ornamental flowers of Daphne bholua, a Nepalese species also used in traditional paper-making

Daphne is grown (despite the high toxicity of its attractive fruit) for its sweetly scented flowers. Species of Wikstroemia, Daphne, Phaleria, Dais, Pimelea and other genera are grown as ornamental plants.

== Gallery ==
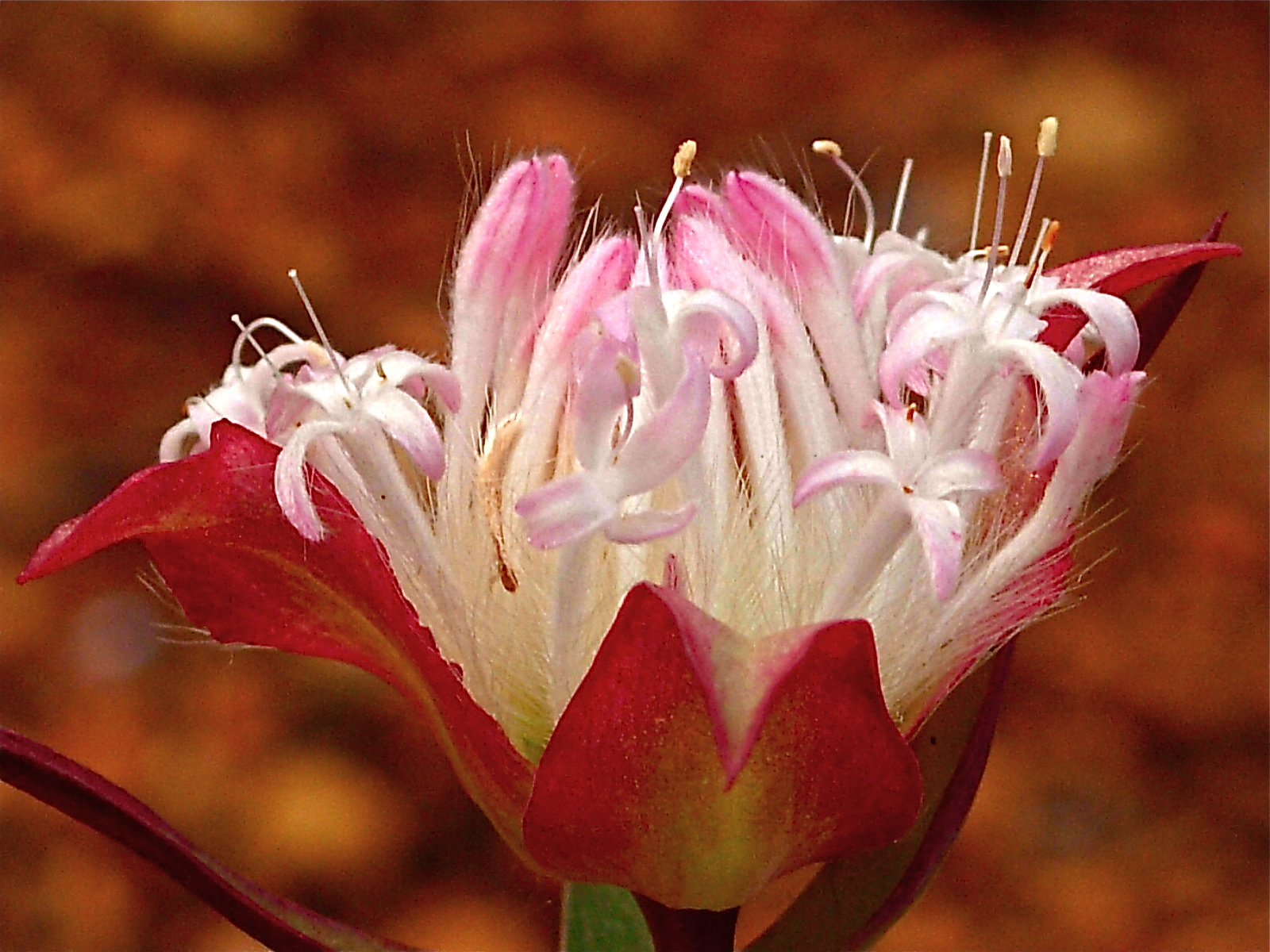
Inflorescence of the Australian Pimelea spectabilis

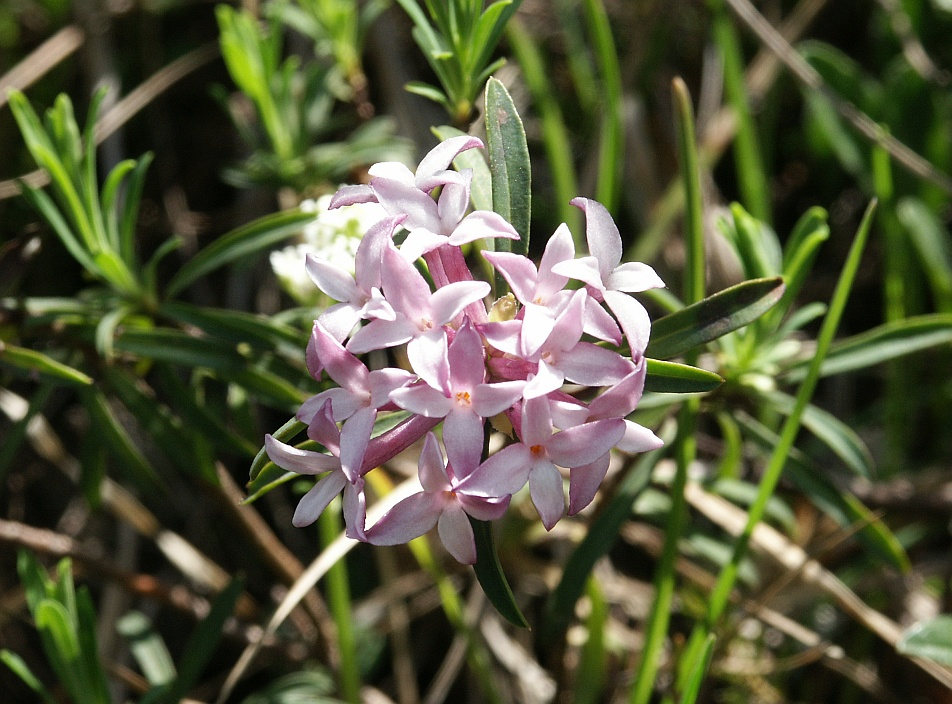
Daphne striata, native to the Alps and the Dolomites

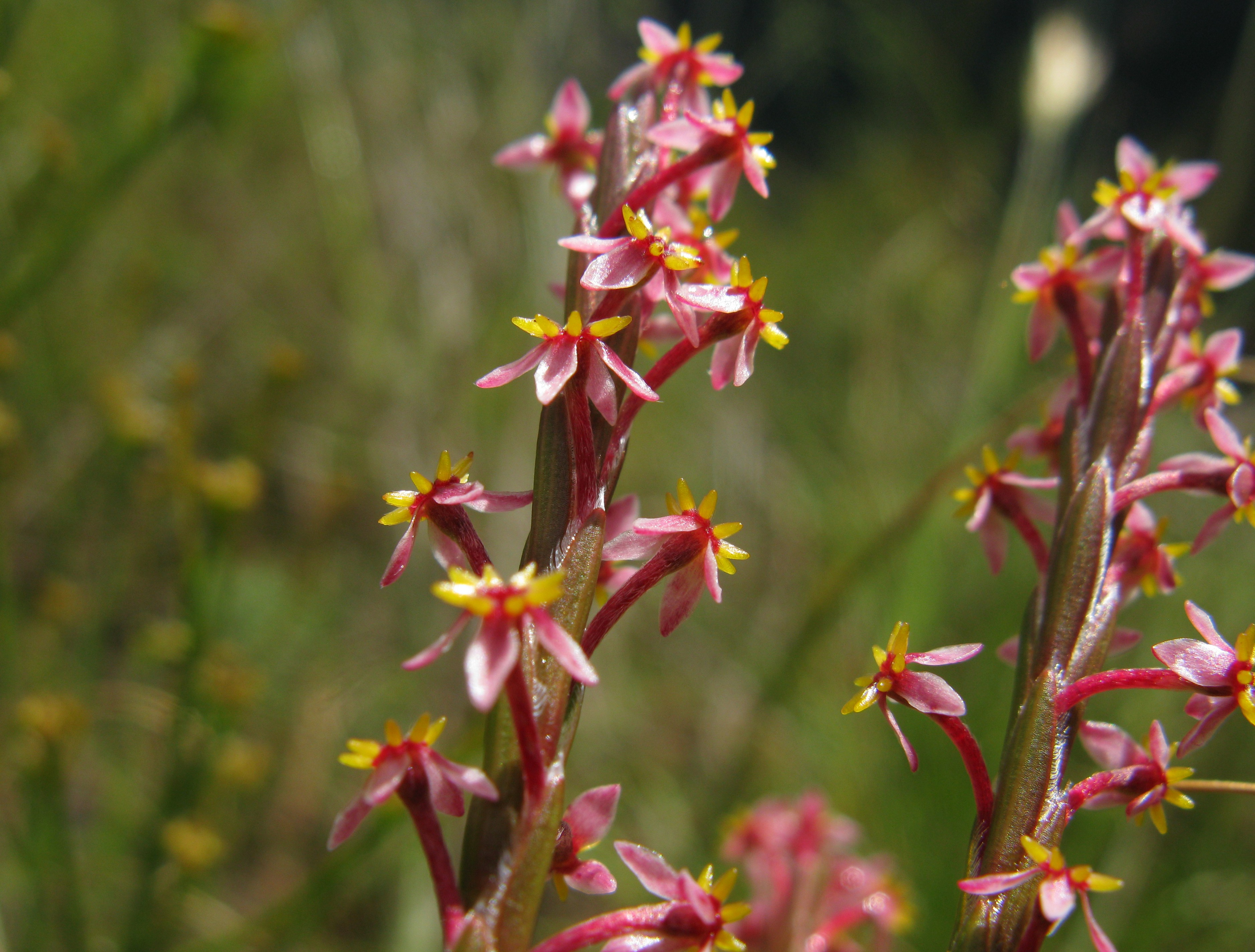
The South African Struthiola myrsinites

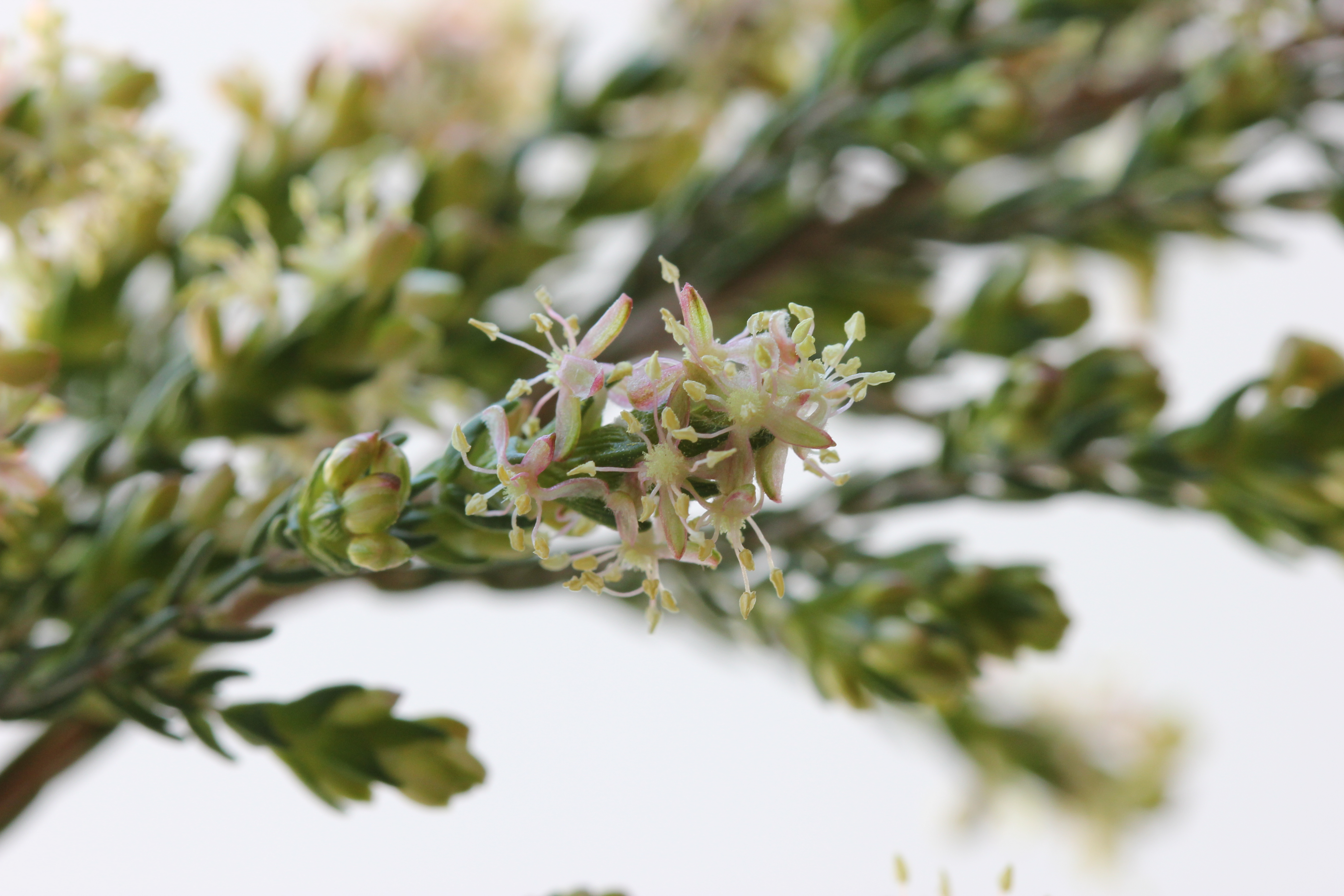
Flowers of an unidentified Passerina species

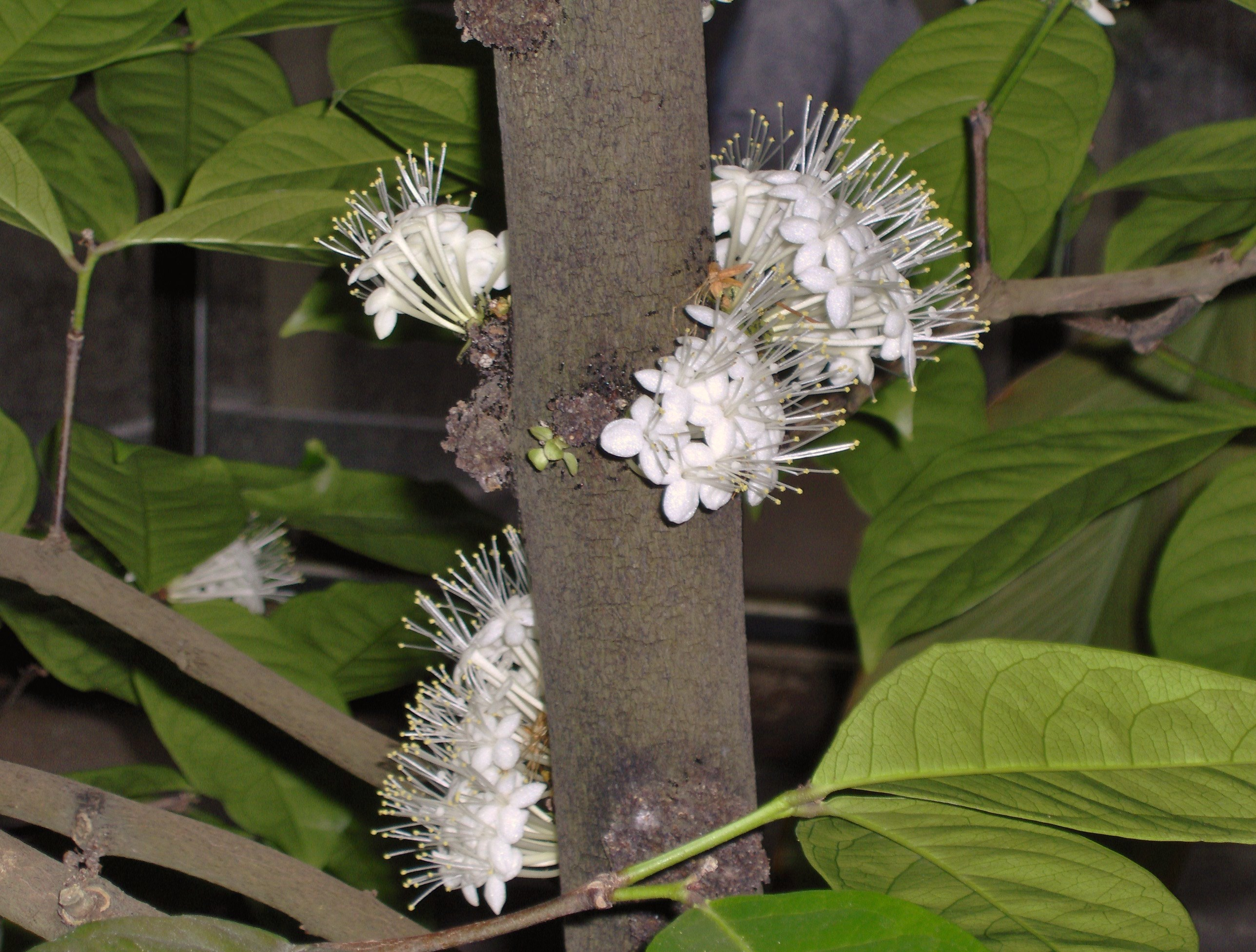
Phaleria capitata of Sumatra exhibiting cauliflory

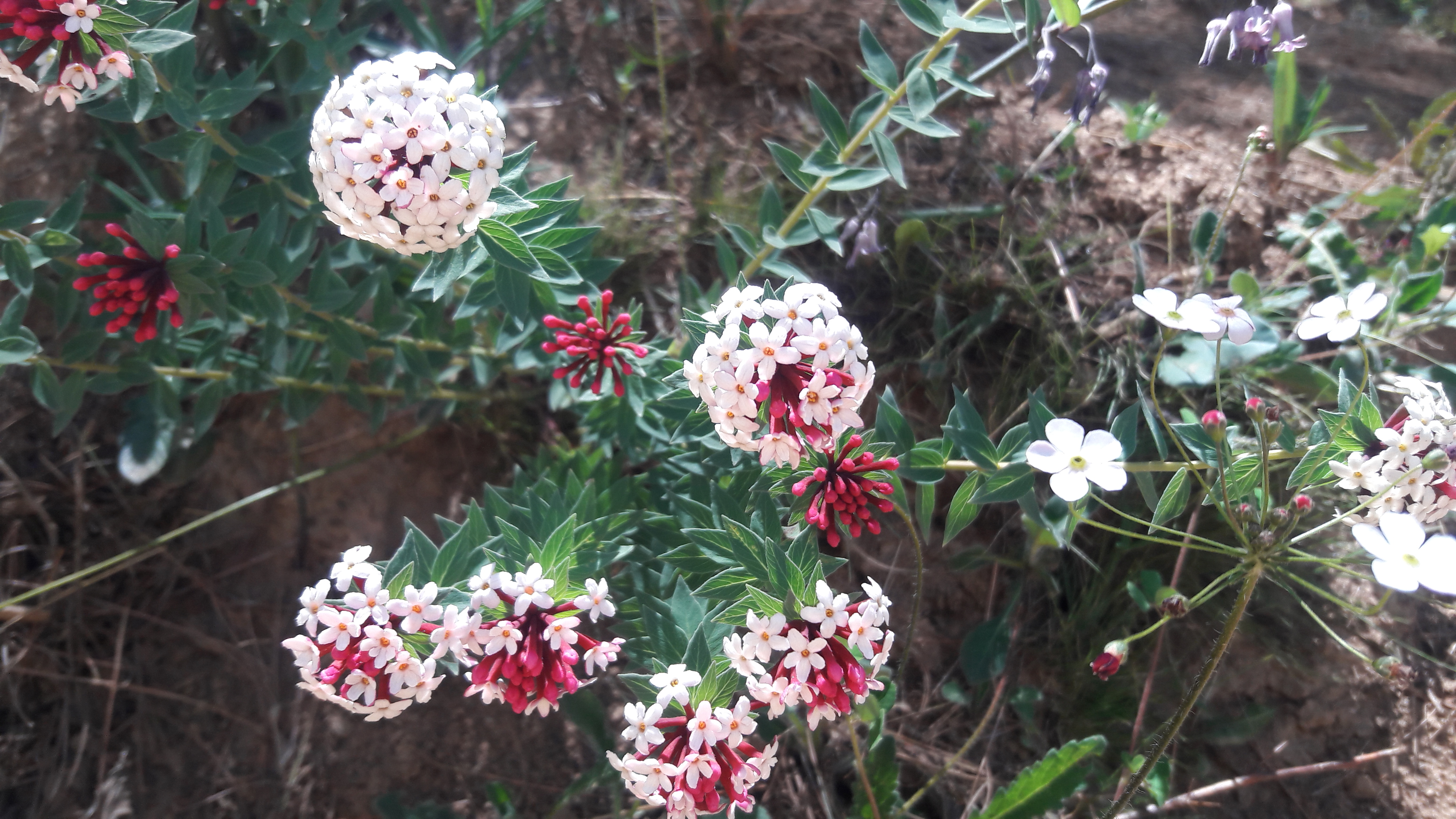
Stellera chamaejasme of Central and East Asia

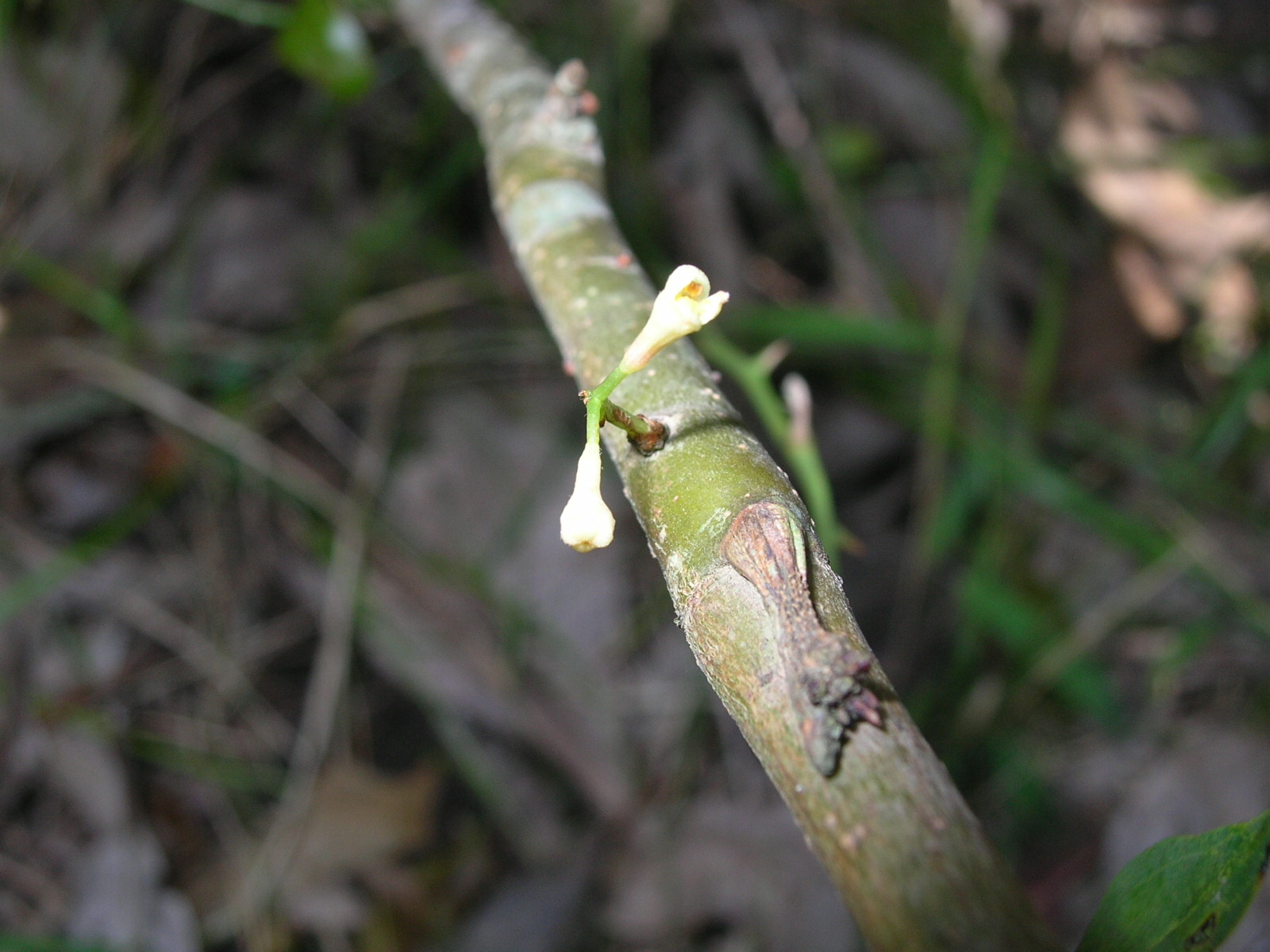
Flower of Daphnopsis racemosa

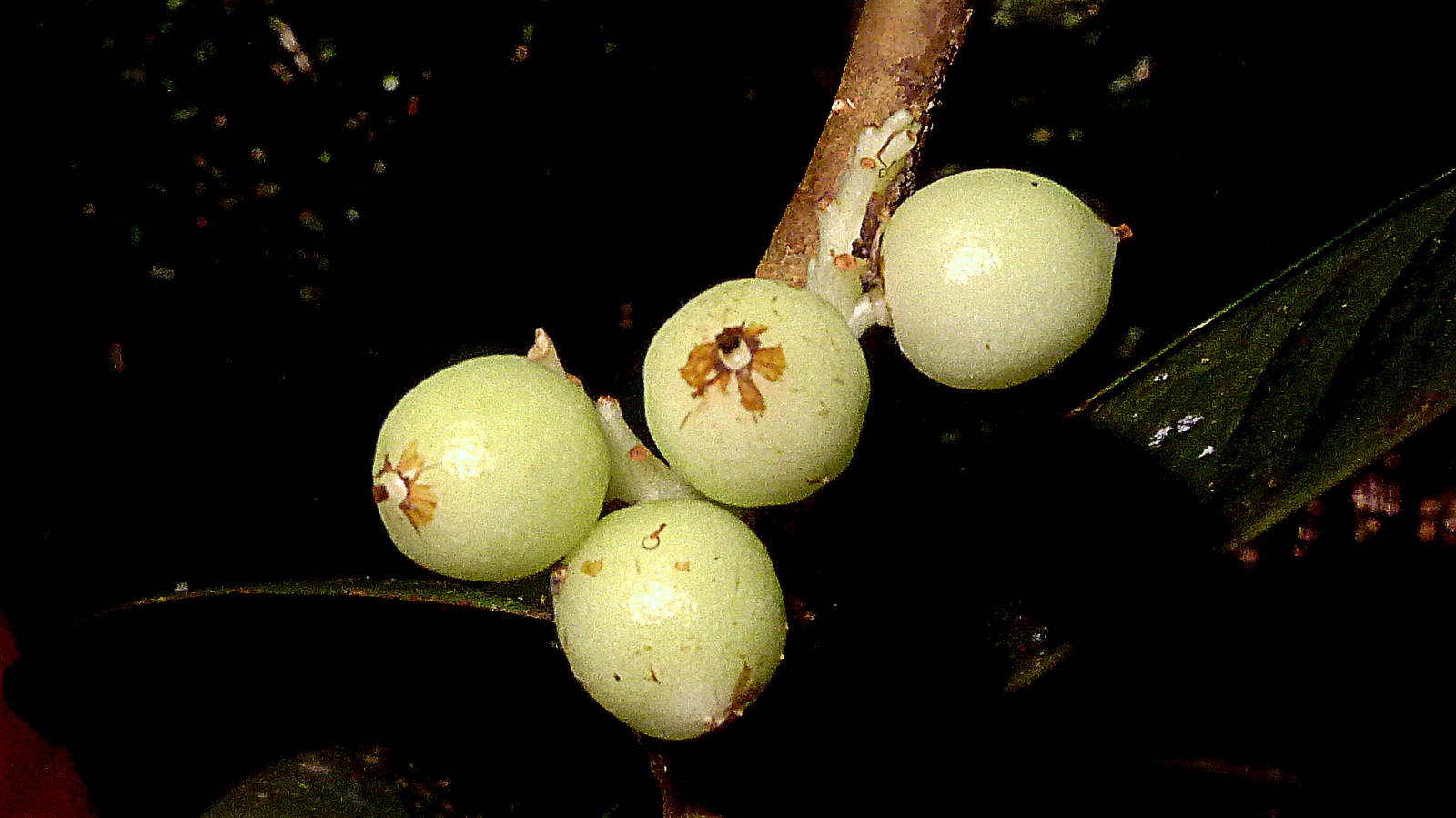
Fruit of Daphnopsis racemosa

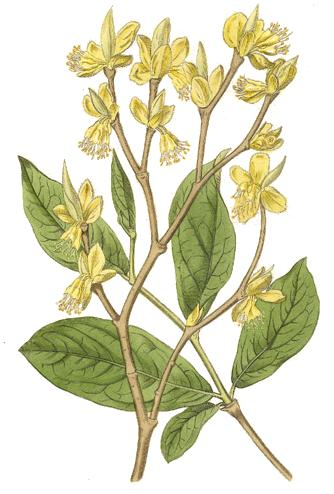
Flowers of Dirca palustris from the United States

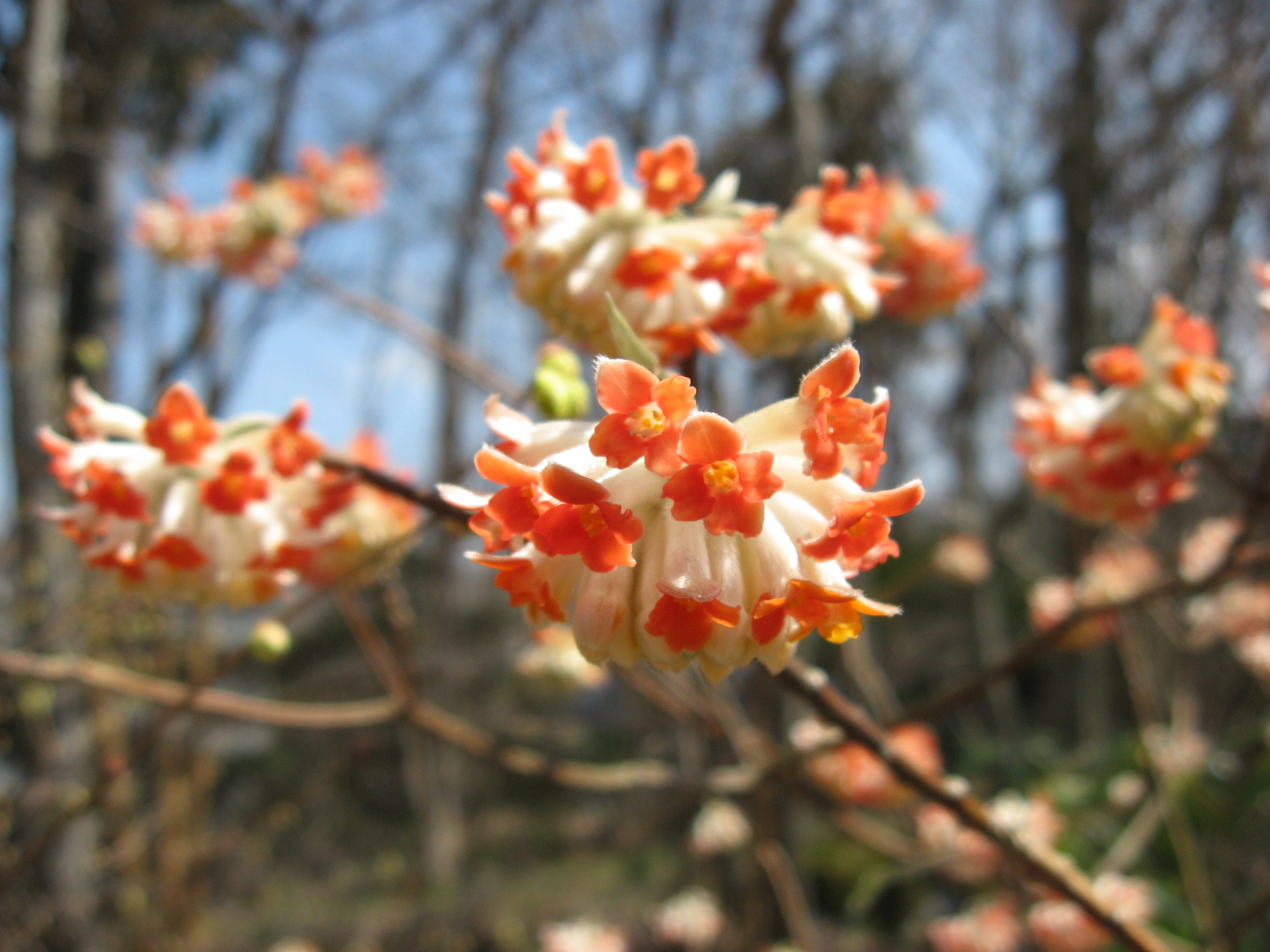
Edgeworthia chrysantha, native to China

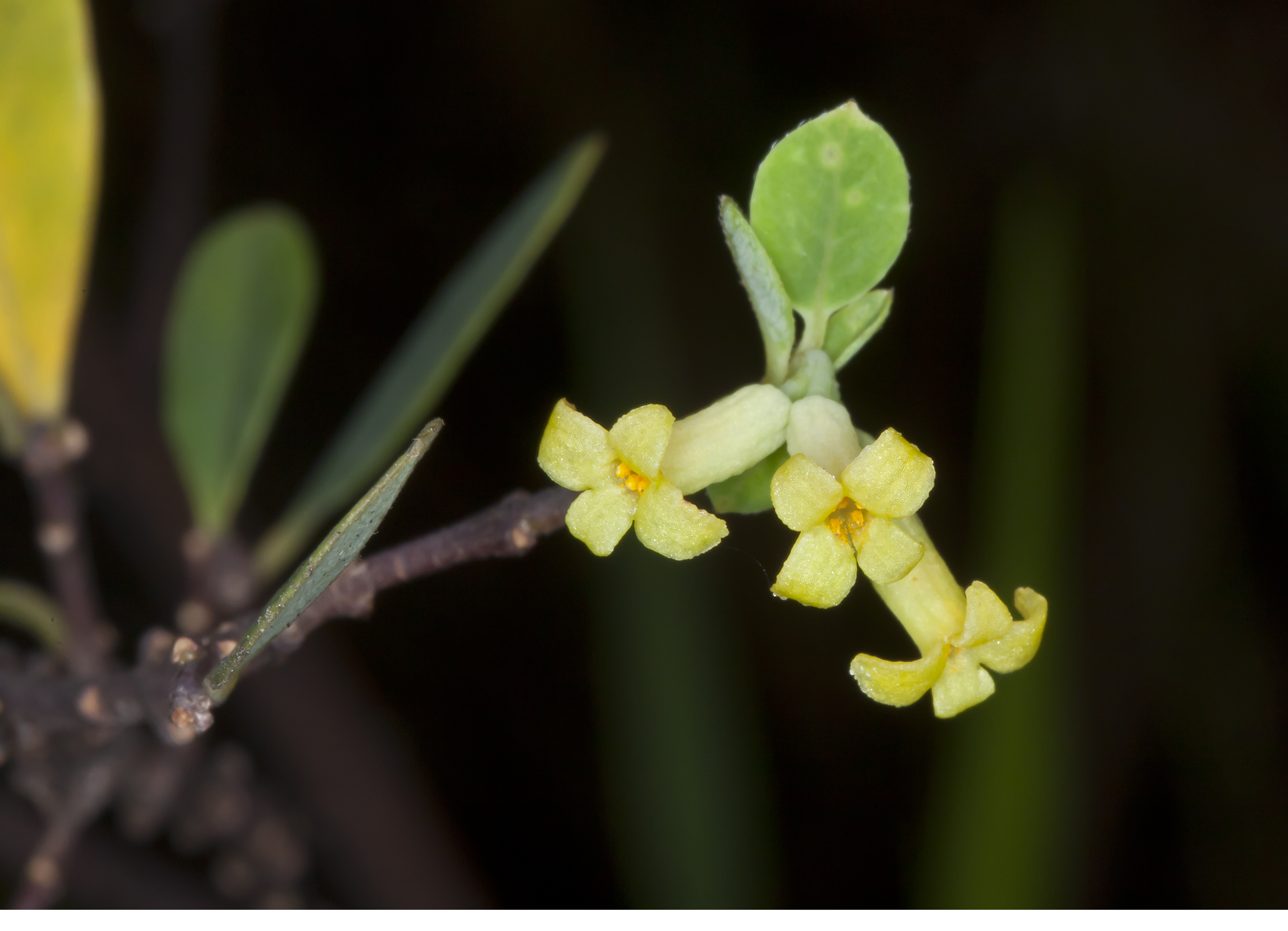
Flowers of the Hawaiian Wikstroemia phillyreifolia
