= Schoenobiblus =

Scientific classification
- Kingdom: Plantae
- Clade: Tracheophytes
- Clade: Angiosperms
- Clade: Eudicots
- Clade: Rosids
- Order: Malvales
- Family: Thymelaeaceae
- Genus: Schoenobiblus; Mart. (1824)

Genus of plants

Schoenobiblus is a genus of flowering plants belonging to the family Thymelaeaceae.

Its native range is Central and Southern tropical America to Trinidad.

== Species ==
Ten species are accepted.

- Schoenobiblus amazonica Steyerm.
- Schoenobiblus cannabina Cuatrec.
- Schoenobiblus coriacea Domke
- Schoenobiblus crassisepala Barringer & Nevling
- Schoenobiblus daphnoides Mart.
- Schoenobiblus elliptica Pilg.
- Schoenobiblus grandifolia Urb.
- Schoenobiblus panamensis Standl. & L.O.Williams
- Schoenobiblus peruviana Standl.
- Schoenobiblus suffruticosa Barringer & Nevling
