= Stephanodaphne =

Scientific classification
- Kingdom: Plantae
- Clade: Tracheophytes
- Clade: Angiosperms
- Clade: Eudicots
- Clade: Rosids
- Order: Malvales
- Family: Thymelaeaceae
- Genus: Stephanodaphne; Baill. (1875)

Genus of plants

Stephanodaphne is a genus of flowering plants belonging to the family Thymelaeaceae.

Its native range is the Comoro Islands and Madagascar.

== Species ==
Nine species are accepted.

- Stephanodaphne boivinii Baill.
- Stephanodaphne cremostachya Baill.
- Stephanodaphne cuspidata (Leandri) Leandri
- Stephanodaphne geminata H.Perrier
- Stephanodaphne humbertii Leandri
- Stephanodaphne pedicellata Z.S.Rogers
- Stephanodaphne perrieri Leandri
- Stephanodaphne pilosa Z.S.Rogers
- Stephanodaphne schatzii Z.S.Rogers
