= Drapetes muscosa =

Scientific classification
- Kingdom: Plantae
- Clade: Tracheophytes
- Clade: Angiosperms
- Clade: Eudicots
- Clade: Rosids
- Order: Malvales
- Family: Thymelaeaceae
- Genus: Drapetes; Banks ex Lam. (1792)
- Species: D. muscosa

Binomial name
- Drapetes muscosa Lam. (1792)

Species of flowering plant

Drapetes muscosa is a species of flowering plant in the family Thymelaeaceae. It is a subshrub native to temperate climate regions of Patagonia and the Falkland Islands.
