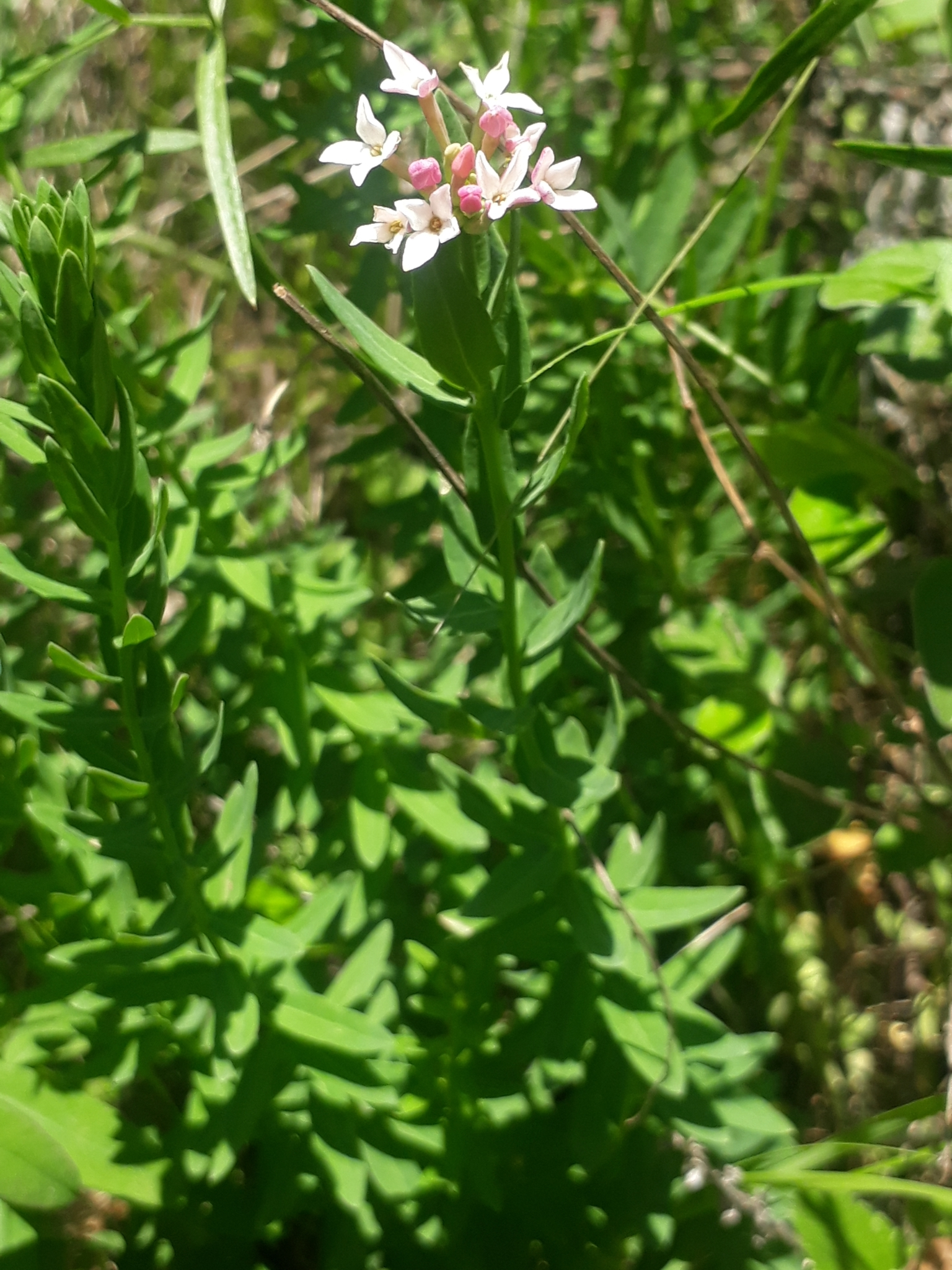
- Diarthron altaica

Scientific classification
- Kingdom: Plantae
- Clade: Embryophytes
- Clade: Tracheophytes
- Clade: Angiosperms
- Clade: Eudicots
- Clade: Rosids
- Order: Malvales
- Family: Thymelaeaceae
- Genus: Diarthron; Turcz. (1832)

Synonyms
- Dendrostellera (C.A.Mey.) Tiegh. (1893); Stelleropsis Pobed. (1950)

= Diarthron =

Genus of flowering plants

Diarthron is a genus of flowering plant in the family Thymelaeaceae. The precise limits of the genus are uncertain. When broadly circumscribed to include Dendrostellera and Stelleropsis, it consists of annual and perennial herbaceous plants and small shrubs, with reddish, white or green flowers lacking petals. It includes 16 species which range from southern European Russia and the Caucasus through Western and Central Asia through China and Mongolia to Korea and the Russian Far East.

== Description ==
When broadly circumscribed (i.e. including Dendrostellera and Stelleropsis), Diarthron is a genus of annual or perennial herbaceous plants or short deciduous shrubs. Prior to a review in 1982, only the annual species were placed in Diarthron, with the perennial herbs being in Stelleropsis and the shrubs in Dendrostellera. The flowers lack petals. There are usually four (sometimes five) sepals, united at the base into a tube with lobes at the end, reddish, white or green in colour. The ovary has a single chamber (locule). The fruit is dry with the seed enclosed in a thin glossy black pericarp.

== Taxonomy ==
The genus Diarthron was first described in 1832 by Nikolai Turczaninow for the species Diarthron linifolium. Many species were added to the genus in 1982 by Kit Tan, being transferred from related genera. A 2006 study suggested that as circumscribed, Diarthron is not monophyletic, so that Dendrostellera and Stelleropsis which Tan had merged into Diarthron should be reinstated. Studies in 2002 and 2009, based on chloroplast DNA, placed Diarthron in a small group of related genera, sister to a clade consisting of Thymelaea and Daphne; however for most genera only one species was included.

- - Edgeworthia
  - - - Wikstroemia
      - Stellera
    - - Diarthron
      - - Thymelaea
        - Daphne

=== Species ===
16 species are currently accepted.

- Diarthron altaicum (Thiéb.-Bern.) Kit Tan
- Diarthron ammodendron (Kar. & Kir.) ined.
- Diarthron antoniniae (Pobed.) Kit Tan
- Diarthron arenarium (Pobed.) Kit Tan
- Diarthron caucasicum (Pobed.) Kit Tan
- Diarthron iranicum (Pobed.) Kit Tan
- Diarthron issykkulense (Pobed.) Kit Tan
- Diarthron lessertii (Wikstr.) Kit Tan
- Diarthron linearifolium (Pobed.) Kit Tan
- Diarthron linifolium Turcz.
- Diarthron macrorhachis (Pobed.) Kit Tan
- Diarthron magakjanii (Sosn.) Kit Tan
- Diarthron tarbagataicum (Pobed.) Kit Tan
- Diarthron tianschanicum (Pobed.) Kit Tan
- Diarthron turkmenorum (Pobed.) Kit Tan
- Diarthron vesiculosum (Fisch. & C.A.Mey.) C.A.Mey.
