= Linostoma (plant) =

Scientific classification
- Kingdom: Plantae
- Clade: Tracheophytes
- Clade: Angiosperms
- Clade: Eudicots
- Clade: Rosids
- Order: Malvales
- Family: Thymelaeaceae
- Genus: Linostoma; Wall. ex Endl. (1837)

Synonyms
- Psilaea Miq. (1861)

Genus of plants

Linostoma is a genus of flowering plants belonging to the family Thymelaeaceae.

Its native range is Assam to Southeastern China and Western Malesia.

== Species ==
Four species are accepted.

- Linostoma decandrum (Roxb.) Steud.
- Linostoma longiflorum Hallier f.
- Linostoma pauciflorum Griff.
- Linostoma persimile Craib

== Uses ==
In Khe Nghè Village in northeastern Bắc Ninh province, Vietnam, artisans belonging to the Cao Lan ethnic group harvest phloem fibers from the species Linostoma persimile for making paper.
