= Dicranolepis =

Scientific classification
- Kingdom: Plantae
- Clade: Tracheophytes
- Clade: Angiosperms
- Clade: Eudicots
- Clade: Rosids
- Order: Malvales
- Family: Thymelaeaceae
- Genus: Dicranolepis; Planch. (1848)

Genus of plants

Dicranolepis is a genus of flowering plants belonging to the family Thymelaeaceae.

Its native range is Tropical Africa.

== Species ==
20 species are accepted.

- Dicranolepis angolensis S.Moore
- Dicranolepis baertsiana De Wild. & T.Durand
- Dicranolepis brixhei De Wild.
- Dicranolepis buchholzii Engl. & Gilg
- Dicranolepis cerasifera Gilg
- Dicranolepis disticha Planch.
- Dicranolepis glandulosa H.Pearson
- Dicranolepis grandiflora Engl.
- Dicranolepis incisa A.Robyns
- Dicranolepis laciniata Gilg
- Dicranolepis persei Cummins
- Dicranolepis polygaloides Gilg ex H.Pearson
- Dicranolepis pubescens H.Pearson
- Dicranolepis pulcherrima Gilg
- Dicranolepis pusilla Aymonin
- Dicranolepis pyramidalis Gilg
- Dicranolepis soyauxii Engl.
- Dicranolepis thomensis Engl. & Gilg
- Dicranolepis usambarica Gilg
- Dicranolepis vestita Engl.
