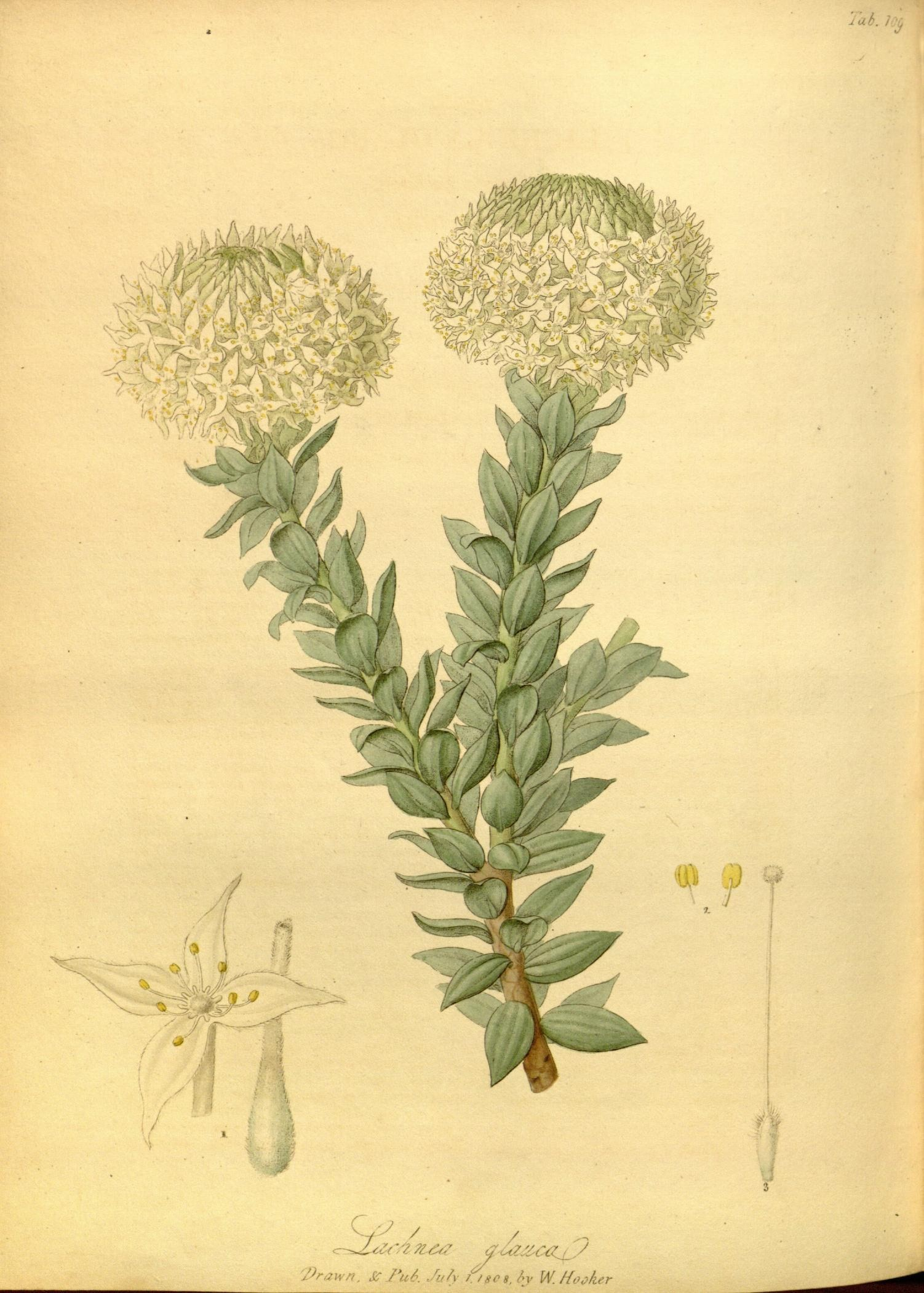
- Lachnaea pomposa botanical illustration

Scientific classification
- Kingdom: Plantae
- Clade: Embryophytes
- Clade: Tracheophytes
- Clade: Angiosperms
- Clade: Eudicots
- Clade: Rosids
- Order: Malvales
- Family: Thymelaeaceae
- Genus: Lachnaea; L. (1753)

Species
- See text

Synonyms
- Calysericos Eckl. & Zeyh. ex Meisn. (1857); Cryptadenia Meisn. (1840); Radojitskya Turcz. (1852); Steiroctis Raf. (1838)

= Lachnaea =

Genus of flowering plants

Lachnaea is a genus of flowering plants in the family Thymelaeaceae, found in the Cape Floristic Region of southern South Africa. They tend to be small ericoid shrubs.

== Species ==
Currently accepted species include:

- Lachnaea alpina Meisn.
- Lachnaea aurea Eckl. & Zeyh. ex Meisn.
- Lachnaea axillaris Meisn.
- Lachnaea burchellii Meisn.
- Lachnaea capitata (L.) Crantz
- Lachnaea densiflora Meisn.
- Lachnaea diosmoides Meisn.
- Lachnaea elsieae Beyers
- Lachnaea ericoides Meisn.
- Lachnaea eriocephala L.
- Lachnaea filamentosa Meisn.
- Lachnaea filicaulis (Meisn.) Beyers
- Lachnaea funicaulis Schinz
- Lachnaea globulifera Meisn.
- Lachnaea glomerata Fourc.
- Lachnaea gracilis Meisn.
- Lachnaea grandiflora (L.f.) Baill.
- Lachnaea greytonensis Beyers
- Lachnaea laniflora (C.H.Wright) Bond
- Lachnaea laxa (C.H.Wright) Beyers
- Lachnaea leipoldtii Beyers
- Lachnaea macrantha Meisn.
- Lachnaea marlothii Schltr.
- Lachnaea montana Beyers
- Lachnaea naviculifolia Compton
- Lachnaea nervosa (Thunb.) Meisn.
- Lachnaea oliverorum Beyers
- Lachnaea pedicellata Beyers
- Lachnaea pendula Beyers
- Lachnaea penicillata Meisn.
- Lachnaea pomposa Beyers
- Lachnaea pudens Beyers
- Lachnaea pusilla Beyers
- Lachnaea rupestris Beyers
- Lachnaea ruscifolia Compton
- Lachnaea sociorum Beyers
- Lachnaea stokoei Beyers
- Lachnaea striata (Lam.) Meisn.
- Lachnaea uniflora (L.) Crantz
- Lachnaea villosa Beyers
