= Craterosiphon =

Scientific classification
- Kingdom: Plantae
- Clade: Tracheophytes
- Clade: Angiosperms
- Clade: Eudicots
- Clade: Rosids
- Order: Malvales
- Family: Thymelaeaceae
- Genus: Craterosiphon; Engl. & Gilg (1894)

Genus of flowering plants

Craterosiphon is a genus of flowering plants belonging to the family Thymelaeaceae.

Its native range is Tropical Africa.

== Species ==
Ten species are accepted.

- Craterosiphon beniensis Domke
- Craterosiphon devredii A.Robyns
- Craterosiphon louisii R.Wilczek ex A.Robyns
- Craterosiphon micranthus A.Robyns
- Craterosiphon montanus Domke
- Craterosiphon pseudoscandens Domke
- Craterosiphon quarrei Staner
- Craterosiphon scandens Engl. & Gilg
- Craterosiphon schmitzii A.Robyns
- Craterosiphon soyauxii H.Pearson
