= Synandrodaphne =

Scientific classification
- Kingdom: Plantae
- Clade: Tracheophytes
- Clade: Angiosperms
- Clade: Eudicots
- Clade: Rosids
- Order: Malvales
- Family: Thymelaeaceae
- Genus: Synandrodaphne; Gilg
- Species: S. paradoxa

Binomial name
- Synandrodaphne paradoxa Gilg

Synonyms
- Gilgiodaphne Domke

Genus of flowering plants

Synandrodaphne is a genus of flowering plants belonging to the family Thymelaeaceae. The only species is Synandrodaphne paradoxa.

Its native range is Western Central Tropical Africa.
