= Enkleia =

Scientific classification
- Kingdom: Plantae
- Clade: Tracheophytes
- Clade: Angiosperms
- Clade: Eudicots
- Clade: Rosids
- Order: Malvales
- Family: Thymelaeaceae
- Genus: Enkleia; Griff.

Synonyms
- Macgregorianthus Merr.

Genus of plants

Enkleia is a genus of flowering plants belonging to the family Thymelaeaceae.

Its native range is Indo-China to New Guinea.

Species:

- Enkleia malaccensis Griff.
- Enkleia paniculata (Merr.) Hallier f.
- Enkleia thorelii (Lecomte) Nevling
