= Synaptolepis =

Scientific classification
- Kingdom: Plantae
- Clade: Tracheophytes
- Clade: Angiosperms
- Clade: Eudicots
- Clade: Rosids
- Order: Malvales
- Family: Thymelaeaceae
- Genus: Synaptolepis; Oliv. (1870)

Genus of flowering plants

Synaptolepis is a genus of flowering plants belonging to the family Thymelaeaceae.

Its native range is tropical and southern Africa and Madagascar.

== Species ==
Five species are accepted.

- Synaptolepis alternifolia Oliv.
- Synaptolepis kirkii Oliv.
- Synaptolepis oliveriana Gilg
- Synaptolepis perrieri Leandri
- Synaptolepis retusa H.Pearson
