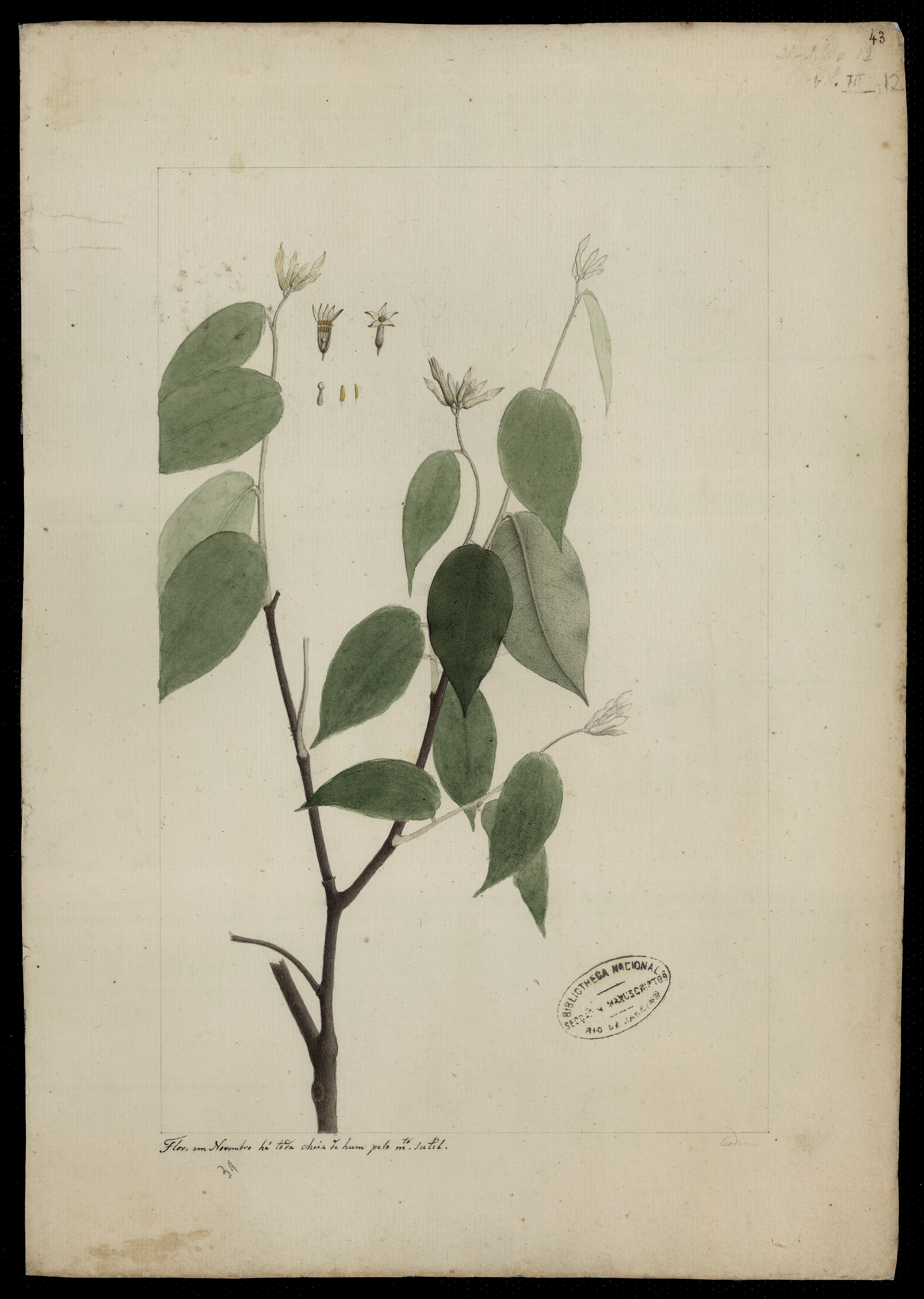
- Lasiadenia rupestris

Scientific classification
- Kingdom: Plantae
- Clade: Embryophytes
- Clade: Tracheophytes
- Clade: Spermatophytes
- Clade: Angiosperms
- Clade: Eudicots
- Clade: Rosids
- Order: Malvales
- Family: Thymelaeaceae
- Genus: Lasiadenia; Benth.

= Lasiadenia =

Genus of plants

Lasiadenia is a genus of flowering plants belonging to the family Thymelaeaceae.

Its native range is Colombia to Guyana and Northern Brazil.

Species:

- Lasiadenia ottohuberi Plowman & Nevling
- Lasiadenia rupestris Benth.
