= Linodendron =

Scientific classification
- Kingdom: Plantae
- Clade: Tracheophytes
- Clade: Angiosperms
- Clade: Eudicots
- Clade: Rosids
- Order: Malvales
- Family: Thymelaeaceae
- Genus: Linodendron; Griseb.

Genus of plants

Linodendron is a genus of flowering plants belonging to the family Thymelaeaceae.

Its native range is Cuba.

Species:

- Linodendron aronifolium Griseb.
- Linodendron cubanum (A.Rich.) Griseb.
- Linodendron venosum Griseb.
