= Goodallia (plant) =

Scientific classification
- Kingdom: Plantae
- Clade: Tracheophytes
- Clade: Angiosperms
- Clade: Eudicots
- Clade: Rosids
- Order: Malvales
- Family: Thymelaeaceae
- Genus: Goodallia; Benth. (1845), nom. cons.
- Species: G. guianensis

Binomial name
- Goodallia guianensis Benth. (1845)

Synonyms
- Goodallia guianensis var. parvifolia Benth. (1845)

Species of flowering plant

Goodallia is a monotypic genus of flowering plants belonging to the family Thymelaeaceae. It just contains one species, Goodallia guianensis Benth.

Its native range is Guyana and northern Brazil.

The genus name of Goodallia is in honour of Edward Angelo Goodall (1819–1908), an English painter and illustrator. The Latin specific epithet of guianensis means "of the Guianas" (an area of north eastern South America). It was first described and published by George Bentham in London J. Bot. Vol.4 on page 633 in 1845.
