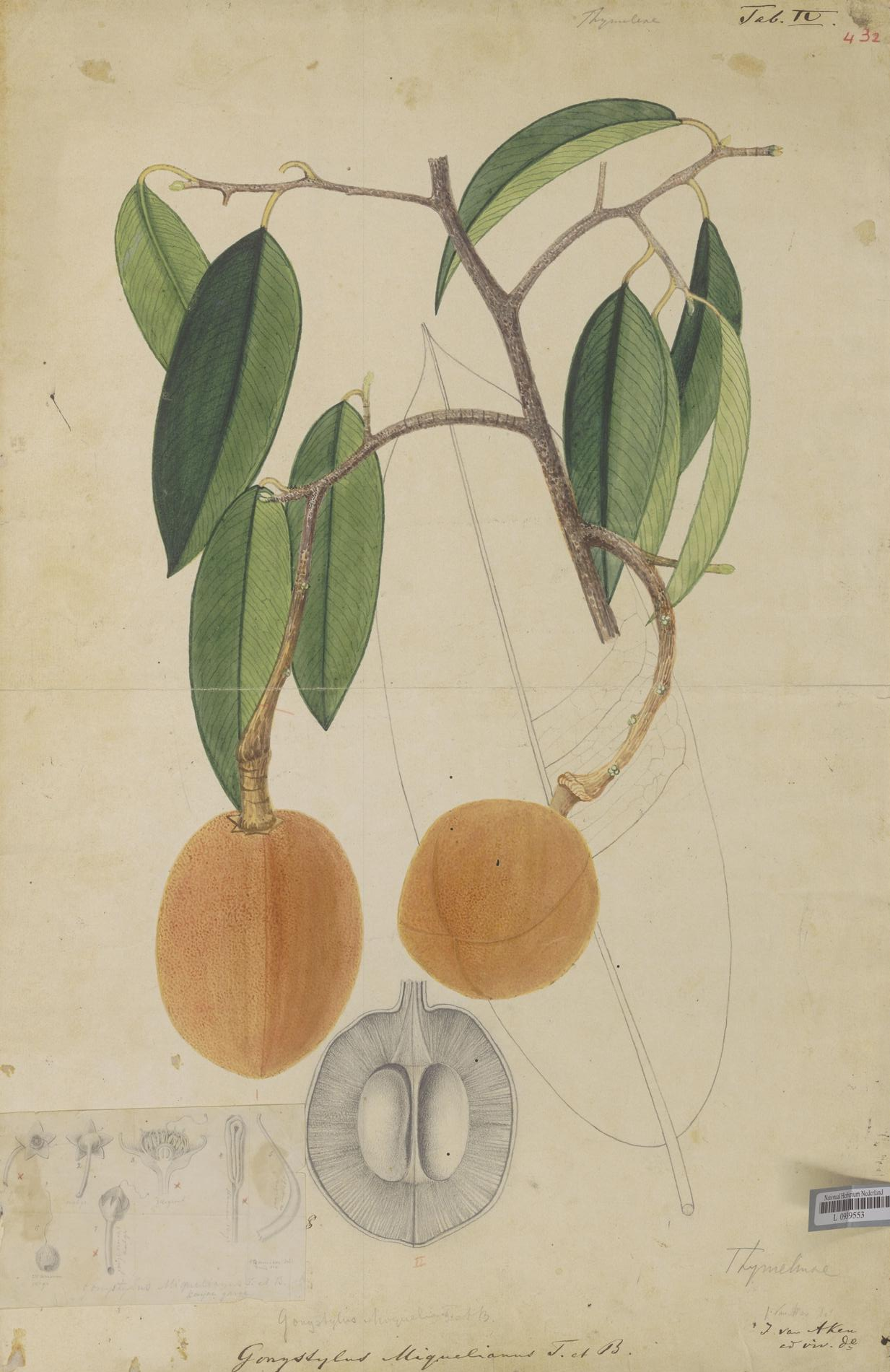
- Gonystylus miquelianus

Scientific classification
- Kingdom: Plantae
- Clade: Tracheophytes
- Clade: Angiosperms
- Clade: Eudicots
- Clade: Rosids
- Order: Malvales
- Family: Thymelaeaceae
- Subfamily: Octolepidoideae

= Octolepidoideae =

Subfamily of plants

Octolepidoideae is a subfamily and one of the earliest branches of the Thymelaeaceae family. This species inherited multiple morphological character states from its ancestor, Thymelaeaceae. The calyx of a typical octolepidoideae is 5-merous. Researchers have found the species to contain 4-merous and 6-merous calyces, albeit they remain rarer.

The pollen of most octolepidoideae are provided with small spinules on the outer covering of their pollen grains.
