= Arnhemia cryptantha =

Scientific classification
- Kingdom: Plantae
- Clade: Tracheophytes
- Clade: Angiosperms
- Clade: Eudicots
- Clade: Rosids
- Order: Malvales
- Family: Thymelaeaceae
- Genus: Arnhemia; Airy Shaw (1978)
- Species: A. cryptantha

Binomial name
- Arnhemia cryptantha Airy Shaw (1978)

Species of flowering plant

Arnhemia cryptantha is a species of flowering plant in the family Thymelaeaceae. It is a subshrub or shrub endemic to the northern Northern Territory of Australia. It is the sole species in genus Arnhemia.
