= Pentaphragma decurrens =

Scientific classification
- Kingdom: Plantae
- Clade: Tracheophytes
- Clade: Angiosperms
- Clade: Eudicots
- Clade: Asterids
- Order: Asterales
- Family: Pentaphragmataceae
- Genus: Pentaphragma
- Species: P. decurrens

Binomial name
- Pentaphragma decurrens Airy Shaw

Species of flowering plant

Pentaphragma decurrens is a species of flowering plant in the family Pentaphragmataceae. It is a perennial native to Borneo, and was described in 1953.

== Taxonomy ==
The species was described by Herbert Kenneth Airy Shaw in 1953.

== Distribution ==
Pentaphragma decurrens is native to the wet tropical biome of Sarawak, Borneo.

== Description ==
Pentaphragma decurrens is a perennial.
