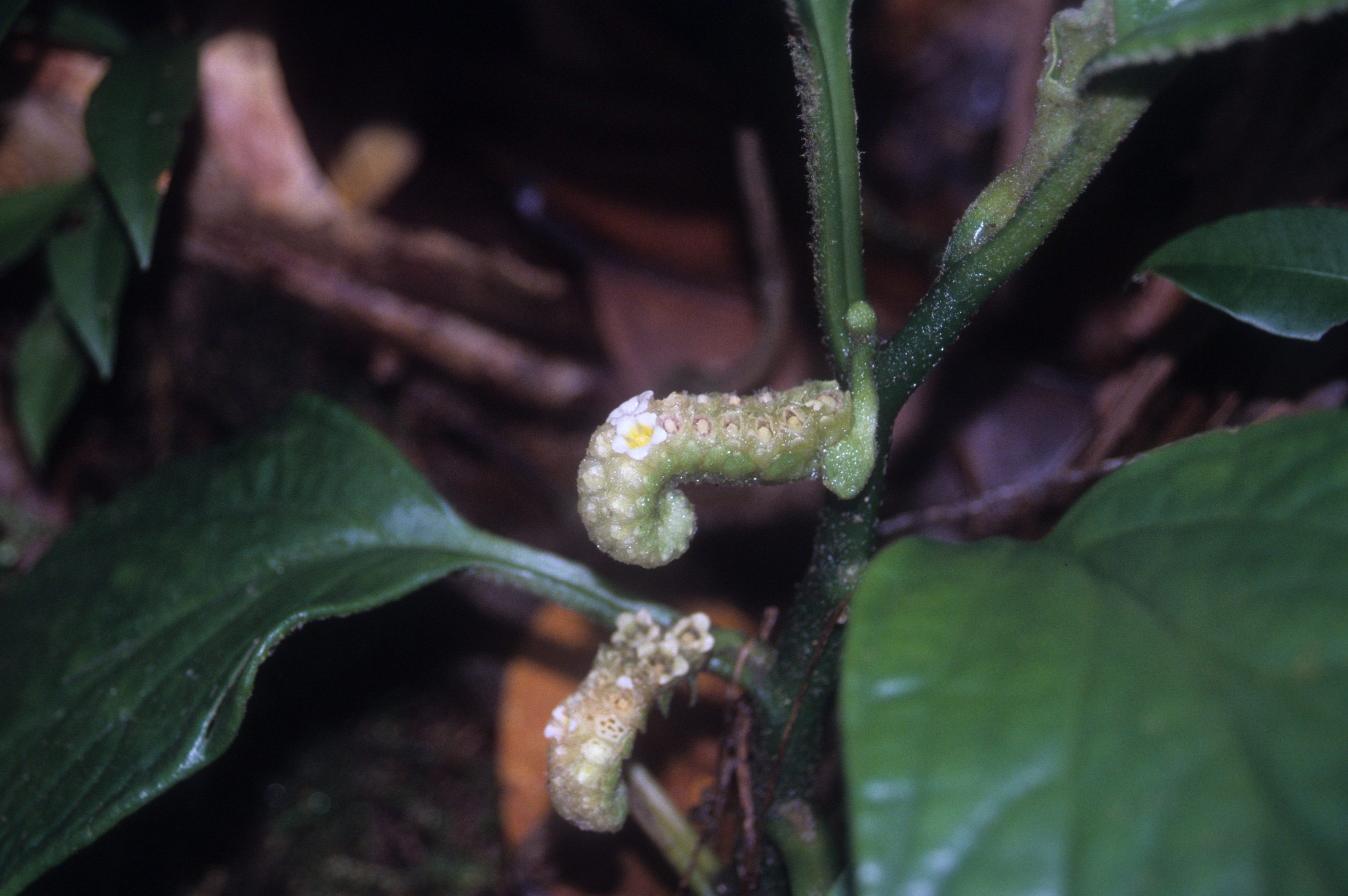

Scientific classification
- Kingdom: Plantae
- Clade: Tracheophytes
- Clade: Angiosperms
- Clade: Eudicots
- Clade: Asterids
- Order: Asterales
- Family: Pentaphragmataceae
- Genus: Pentaphragma
- Species: P. horsfieldii

Binomial name
- Pentaphragma horsfieldii (Miq.) Airy Shaw

Synonyms
- Cyrtandra horsfieldii Miq.; Pentaphragma integrifolium Merr.; Pentaphragma integrifolium var. longipetiolatum Merr.; Pentaphragma scortechinii King & Gamble; Pentaphragma sumatranum Ridl.

= Pentaphragma horsfieldii =

Species of flowering plant

Pentaphragma horsfieldii is a species of flowering plant in the family Pentaphragmataceae. It is a perennial plant with white flowers, and is native to south-east Asia. The species was described in 1858.

== Taxonomy ==
The species was described by Friedrich Anton Wilhelm Miquel in 1858, and placed in the genus Cyrtandra. In 1953, Herbert Kenneth Airy Shaw moved it to the genus Pentaphragma.

== Distribution ==
Pentaphragma horsfieldii is native to the wet tropical biome of Peninsular Malaysia, Sarawak, Sumatra, and peninsular Thailand. The species grows in moist, shady areas in evergreen forests. It is found near streams, at elevations of up to 1,300 metres (4,300 ft).

== Description ==
Pentaphragma horsfieldii is a perennial. The stem is 3–30 centimetres (1.2–11.8 in) long. The leaves are ovate or elliptical, slightly asymmetrical, 12–25 centimetres (4.7–9.8 in) long, and 6–13 centimetres (2.4–5.1 in) wide. The edges are finely toothed or smooth, and often rolled downwards. The leaf stems are 2–8.5 centimetres (0.79–3.35 in) long.

The inflorescence is scorpioid, curved, hanging, and grows on a 0.7–2 centimetres (0.28–0.79 in) long stem. The inflorescence is 2–9 centimetres (0.79–3.54 in) long, and has six to forty florets. The calyx is a white tube measuring 6–8 millimetres (0.24–0.31 in) long, and 3–4 millimetres (0.12–0.16 in) wide. The calyx has lobes, which are 2–3 millimetres (0.079–0.118 in) long, and 1–2.5 millimetres (0.039–0.098 in) wide. The corolla is white or greenish white, spoon-shaped, 2–3 millimetres (0.079–0.118 in) long, and around 2 millimetres (0.079 in) wide. The plant flowers from April to December.

The fruits are obovoid, around 5 millimetres (0.20 in) long, and around 3 millimetres (0.12 in) wide. The plant fruits from April to December.
