= G. nobilis =

G. nobilis may refer to:

- Gallinago nobilis, the noble snipe, a small stocky wader species found in the Andes of Colombia, Ecuador, Peru and Venezuela
- Gambusia nobilis, the Pecos gambusia, a fish species endemic to the United States
- Gnorimus nobilis, the noble chafer, a green beetle species
- Gonystylus nobilis, a plant species endemic to Malaysia

== See also ==
- Nobilis (disambiguation)
