= Allium nanodes =

短葶山葱 duan ting shan cong

Scientific classification
- Kingdom: Plantae
- Clade: Tracheophytes
- Clade: Angiosperms
- Clade: Monocots
- Order: Asparagales
- Family: Amaryllidaceae
- Subfamily: Allioideae
- Genus: Allium
- Species: A. nanodes

Binomial name
- Allium nanodes Airy Shaw

Species of plant

Allium nanodes is a plant species native to the Sichuan and Yunnan regions of southern China. It grows in open areas at elevations of 3300–5200 m.

Allium nanodes is unusual in the genus in several respects. The leaves are opposite, green tinged with purple, broadly oblong, up to 9 cm long and up to 3 cm wide. The scape is extremely short, rarely more than 5 cm tall. The flowers are white, sometimes with a slight reddish tinge.
