= Pentaphragma jaherii =

Scientific classification
- Kingdom: Plantae
- Clade: Embryophytes
- Clade: Tracheophytes
- Clade: Angiosperms
- Clade: Eudicots
- Clade: Asterids
- Order: Asterales
- Family: Pentaphragmataceae
- Genus: Pentaphragma
- Species: P. jaherii

Binomial name
- Pentaphragma jaherii Airy Shaw

Species of flowering plant

Pentaphragma jaherii is a species of flowering plant in the fmaily Pentaphragmataceae. It is a perennial native to Borneo. The species was described in 1953.

== Taxonomy ==
The species was described by Herbert Kenneth Airy Shaw in 1953. The species description was based on a single plant.

== Distribution ==
Pentaphragma jaherii is native to the wet tropical biome of central Borneo.

== Description ==
Pentaphragma jaherii is a perennial plant. The stalk is around 5 centimetres (2.0 in) long, and 3–4 millimetres (0.12–0.16 in) wide.

The leaves are 7.5–9 centimetres (3.0–3.5 in) long, and 3.5–4.5 centimetres (1.4–1.8 in) wide.
