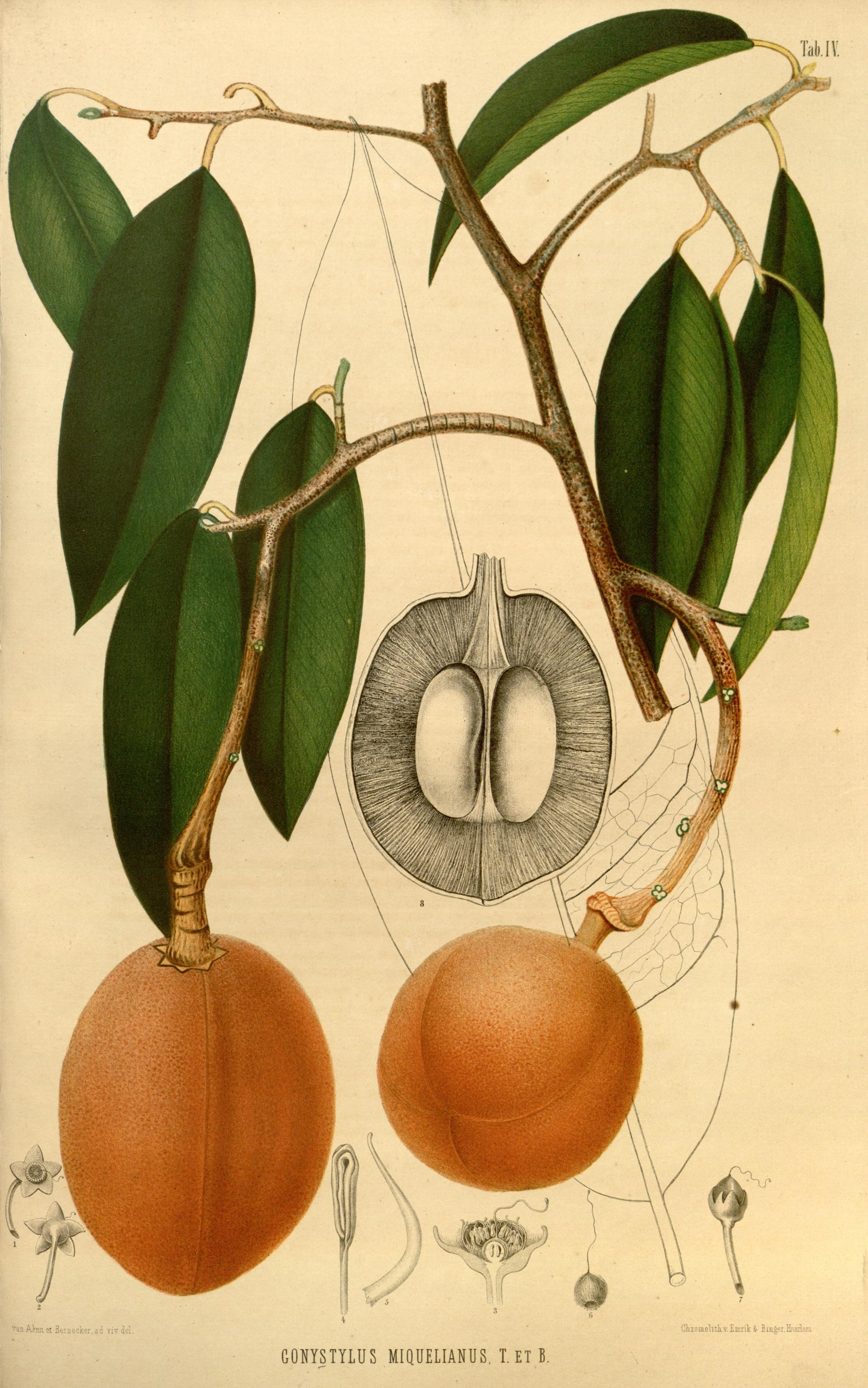
- Botanical drawing of Gonystylus miquelianus (now Gonystylus macrophyllus), 1863

Conservation status
- Least Concern (IUCN 3.1)

Scientific classification
- Kingdom: Plantae
- Clade: Tracheophytes
- Clade: Angiosperms
- Clade: Eudicots
- Clade: Rosids
- Order: Malvales
- Family: Thymelaeaceae
- Genus: Gonystylus
- Species: G. macrophyllus

Binomial name
- Gonystylus macrophyllus (Miq.) Airy Shaw

Synonyms
- Aquilaria macrophylla Miq.; Gonystylus miquelianus Teijsm. & Binn. (nom. superfl.); Gonystylus obovatus Merr.; Gonystylus philippinensis Elmer

= Gonystylus macrophyllus =

Species of ramin tree

Gonystylus macrophyllus is a species of plant in the family Thymelaeaceae. It is native to Indonesia, Malaysia, the Nicobar Islands, Papua New Guinea, East Timor, the Solomon Islands, and possibly the Philippines.
