= Gonystylus velutinus =

Conservation status
- Near Threatened (IUCN 3.1)

Scientific classification
- Kingdom: Plantae
- Clade: Tracheophytes
- Clade: Angiosperms
- Clade: Eudicots
- Clade: Rosids
- Order: Malvales
- Family: Thymelaeaceae
- Genus: Gonystylus
- Species: G. velutinus

Binomial name
- Gonystylus velutinus Airy Shaw

Species of ramin tree

Gonystylus velutinus is a tree in the family Thymelaeaceae.

== Description ==
Gonystylus velutinus grows as a tree up to 35 metres (110 ft) tall, with a trunk diameter of up to 70 cm (30 in). Its bark is pale to reddish brown. The fruit is ellipsoid, brown, up to 5.5 cm (2 in) long.

== Distribution and habitat ==
Gonystylus velutinus is native to Sumatra and Borneo. Its habitat is forest to 100 m (300 ft) altitude.
