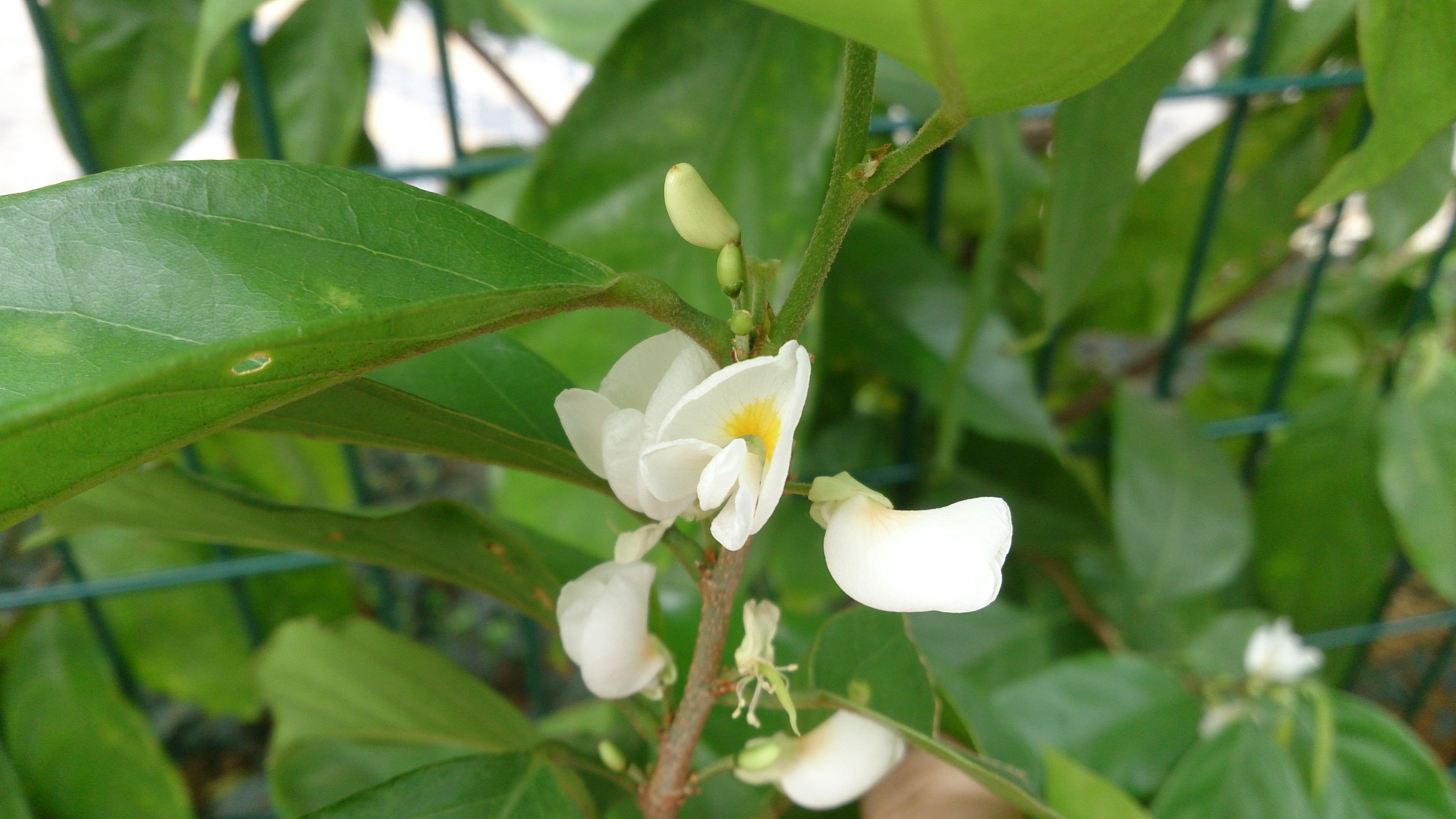
- Baphia nitida

Scientific classification
- Kingdom: Plantae
- Clade: Tracheophytes
- Clade: Angiosperms
- Clade: Eudicots
- Clade: Rosids
- Order: Fabales
- Family: Fabaceae
- Subfamily: Faboideae
- Clade: Meso-Papilionoideae
- Tribe: Baphieae (Yakovlev 1991) Cardoso et al. 2013

Type genus
- Baphia Afzel. ex Lodd. et al.

Genera
- See text

Synonyms
- Baphia group sensu Polhill, 1981; Baphioid clade Pennington et al. 2001; Sophoreae sensu Polhill, 1981 pro parte 8; Swartzieae sensu Cowan, 1981 pro parte D

= Baphieae =

Tribe of legumes

The tribe Baphieae is one of the subdivisions of the plant family Fabaceae. The Baphieae tribe arose 55.3 ± 0.4 million years ago (in the early Eocene).

== Genera ==
The Baphieae tribe has been circumscribed to include the following genera, which used to be placed in tribes Sophoreae and Swartzieae:

- Airyantha Brummitt
- Baphia Afzel. ex Lodd. et al.
- Baphiastrum Harms
- Baphiopsis Benth. ex Baker
- Bowringia Champ. ex Benth.
- Dalhousiea Wall. ex Benth.
- Leucomphalos Benth. ex Planch.

This clade does not currently have a node-based, phylogenetic definition. Members of the Baphieae exhibit the following synapomorphies:

…free stamens and poorly differentiated lower petals, or flowers sometimes appearing radially symmetrical,…simple or unifoliolate leaves, anthers more or less basifixed, and the calyx splitting to the base either down one side only and so appearing spathaceous, or down both sides and so becoming bilabiate.
