= Gonystylus brunnescens =

Conservation status
- Near Threatened (IUCN 3.1)

Scientific classification
- Kingdom: Plantae
- Clade: Tracheophytes
- Clade: Angiosperms
- Clade: Eudicots
- Clade: Rosids
- Order: Malvales
- Family: Thymelaeaceae
- Genus: Gonystylus
- Species: G. brunnescens

Binomial name
- Gonystylus brunnescens Airy Shaw

Species of flowering plant

Gonystylus brunnescens is a flowering plant in the family Thymelaeaceae. It is native to Southeast Asia.

== Description ==
Gonystylus brunnescens grows as a tree up to 40 m (130 ft) tall, with a trunk diameter of up to 100 cm (40 in). The bark is reddish to dark brown. The fruit is round, brown, up to 7 cm (3 in) in diameter.

== Taxonomy ==
Gonystylus brunnescens was first described in 1950 by English botanist Herbert Kenneth Airy Shaw in the Kew Bulletin. The type specimen was collected in Kalimantan in Borneo. The specific epithet brunnescens means 'brownish', referring to the dry leaves.

== Distribution and habitat ==
Gonystylus brunnescens is native to Borneo and Peninsular Malaysia. Its habitat is in dipterocarp and montane forests from 40–1,500 m (100–4,900 ft) altitude.

== Conservation ==
Gonystylus brunnescens has been assessed as near threatened on the IUCN Red List. Its habitat is threatened by harvesting for its wood and by conversion of land for palm oil plantations. The species is present in some protected areas including Mount Kinabalu National Park, Gunung Mulu National Park, Hose Mountains National Park and Kubah National Park.
