= Baphia pauloi =

Conservation status
- Endangered (IUCN 3.1)

Scientific classification
- Kingdom: Plantae
- Clade: Tracheophytes
- Clade: Angiosperms
- Clade: Eudicots
- Clade: Rosids
- Order: Fabales
- Family: Fabaceae
- Subfamily: Faboideae
- Genus: Baphia
- Species: B. pauloi

Binomial name
- Baphia pauloi Brummitt
- The distribution of Baphia pauloi.

Species of legume

Baphia pauloi is a species of plant in the family Fabaceae. It is found only in Tanzania. It is threatened by habitat loss.
