= Gonystylus micranthus =

Conservation status
- Vulnerable (IUCN 3.1)

Scientific classification
- Kingdom: Plantae
- Clade: Tracheophytes
- Clade: Angiosperms
- Clade: Eudicots
- Clade: Rosids
- Order: Malvales
- Family: Thymelaeaceae
- Genus: Gonystylus
- Species: G. micranthus

Binomial name
- Gonystylus micranthus Airy Shaw

Species of flowering plant

Gonystylus micranthus is a flowering plant in the family Thymelaeaceae. It is native to Borneo.

== Description ==
Gonystylus micranthus grows as a tree up to 25 m (82 ft) tall, with a trunk diameter of up to 60 cm (24 in). The bark is dark brown, sometimes flaky. The fruit is dark brown, up to 4 cm (1.6 in) long.

== Taxonomy ==
Gonystylus micranthus was first described in 1950 by English botanist Herbert Kenneth Airy Shaw in the Kew Bulletin. The type specimen was collected in Sarawak in Borneo. The specific epithet micranthus means 'small flower'.

== Distribution and habitat ==
Gonystylus micranthus is endemic to Borneo. Its habitat is in dipterocarp and kerangas forests to 100 m (330 ft) altitude.

== Conservation ==
Gonystylus micranthus has been assessed as vulnerable on the IUCN Red List. Its habitat is threatened by deforestation and by conversion of land for palm oil plantations. The species is present in some protected areas including Bako National Park, Lambir Hills National Park and Semenggoh Nature Reserve.
