= Gonystylus areolatus =

Conservation status
- Endangered (IUCN 3.1)

Scientific classification
- Kingdom: Plantae
- Clade: Tracheophytes
- Clade: Angiosperms
- Clade: Eudicots
- Clade: Rosids
- Order: Malvales
- Family: Thymelaeaceae
- Genus: Gonystylus
- Species: G. areolatus

Binomial name
- Gonystylus areolatus Domke ex Airy Shaw

Species of flowering plant

Gonystylus areolatus is a flowering plant in the family Thymelaeaceae. It is native to Borneo.

== Description ==
Gonystylus areolatus grows as a small tree up to 10 m (33 ft) tall. The bark is greyish brown. The bullate leaves are oblong and measure up to 50 cm (20 in) long and to 11 cm (4 in) wide.

== Taxonomy ==
Gonystylus areolatus was validly published in 1952 by English botanist Herbert Kenneth Airy Shaw in the Kew Bulletin. The type specimen was collected in Kalimantan in Borneo. The specific epithet areolatus means 'net-like', referring to the leaf veins.

== Distribution and habitat ==
Gonystylus areolatus is endemic to Borneo. Its habitat is mixed dipterocarp forests at around 50 m (160 ft) altitude.

== Conservation ==
Gonystylus areolatus has been assessed as endangered on the IUCN Red List. Its habitat is threatened by deforestation and the species is slow to regenerate. The species is present in Semengoh Nature Reserve in Sarawak.
