= Pentaphragma bicolor =

Scientific classification
- Kingdom: Plantae
- Clade: Embryophytes
- Clade: Tracheophytes
- Clade: Spermatophytes
- Clade: Angiosperms
- Clade: Eudicots
- Clade: Asterids
- Order: Asterales
- Family: Pentaphragmataceae
- Genus: Pentaphragma
- Species: P. bicolor

Binomial name
- Pentaphragma bicolor C.W.Lin

Species of flowering plant

Pentaphragma bicolor is a species of flowering plant in the family Pentaphragmataceae. It is a herb or tree with ovate to elliptical leaves, and yellow to white flowers. The species is named for the colours of its flowers.

Pentaphragma bicolor is endemic to Sarawak, Borneo, and was described in 2016.

== Taxonomy ==
The species was described by Che Wei Lin in 2016. The type material was cultivated in a greenhouse in Hong Kong.

== Distribution ==
Pentaphragma bicolor is native to the wet tropical biome of Sarawak, Borneo. It is endemic to the Sri Aman Division, where it grows in valleys, and on steep slopes, in mixed dipterocarp forests. The species is present at elevations of 100–300 metres (330–980 ft).

== Description ==
Pentaphragma bicolor is a fleshy herb or tree, with branches that grow horizontally along the ground. The stem can be over 20 centimetres (7.9 in) long, and is 0.4–0.7 centimetres (0.16–0.28 in) wide.

The leaves are arranged alternately, and the lower leaves are pressed against the stem. The leaves are broadly ovate to elliptical, 6–15 centimetres (2.4–5.9 in) long, and 4.5–10 centimetres (1.8–3.9 in) wide. The leaves are fleshy when fresh, and papery or leathery when dry. The leaf stems are 0.5–2 centimetres (0.20–0.79 in) long, and have dense hairs.

The inflorescence is a cyme with three to ten flowers. The inflorescence has a short stem, or no stem. The flowers have almost no stem, and are 1.8–3 centimetres (0.71–1.18 in) long. The calyx has five pale green lobes, which are oblong to ovate, 5–8 millimetres (0.20–0.31 in) long, and 1.2–5 millimetres (0.047–0.197 in) wide. The corolla is golden yellow, and turns cream-white or pale green with age. The petals are fused into a tube, which is 5–6 millimetres (0.20–0.24 in) long, and 4–5 millimetres (0.16–0.20 in) wide. The tube has five fleshy lobes, which are ovate-triangular, 3–4 millimetres (0.12–0.16 in) long, and around 2.5 millimetres (0.098 in) wide. The hypanthium is approximately rod-shaped, 12–20 millimetres (0.47–0.79 in) long, 2–4 millimetres (0.079–0.157 in) wide, and shallowly ribbed. The flowers have five stamens.

Pentaphragma bicolor resembles Pentaphragma prostratum and Pentaphragma longisepalum.

== Etymology ==
The specific epithet bicolor refers to the corolla, and its contrasting yellow and white colours.
