= Gonystylus eximius =

Conservation status
- Endangered (IUCN 3.1)

Scientific classification
- Kingdom: Plantae
- Clade: Tracheophytes
- Clade: Angiosperms
- Clade: Eudicots
- Clade: Rosids
- Order: Malvales
- Family: Thymelaeaceae
- Genus: Gonystylus
- Species: G. eximius

Binomial name
- Gonystylus eximius Airy Shaw

Species of ramin tree

Gonystylus eximius is a tree in the family Thymelaeaceae. The specific epithet eximius means 'excellent'.

== Description ==
Gonystylus eximius grows as a small tree up to 5 metres (20 ft) tall, with a stem diameter of up to 10 cm (4 in). The twigs are yellowish brown. Its flowers are reddish brown.

== Distribution and habitat ==
Gonystylus eximius is endemic to Borneo, where it is known only from Sarawak. Its habitat is lowland mixed dipterocarp forest at altitudes of 40–250 m (100–800 ft).
