= Pentaphragma pendulum =

Scientific classification
- Kingdom: Plantae
- Clade: Embryophytes
- Clade: Tracheophytes
- Clade: Angiosperms
- Clade: Eudicots
- Clade: Asterids
- Order: Asterales
- Family: Pentaphragmataceae
- Genus: Pentaphragma
- Species: P. pendulum

Binomial name
- Pentaphragma pendulum C.W.Lin

Species of flowering plant

Pentaphragma pendulum is a species of flowering plant in the family Pentaphragmataceae. It is a climbing plant or herb with round, dark green leaves, and cream-yellow to green flowers. The species is native to Borneo, and was described in 2016.

== Taxonomy ==
The species was described by Che Wei Lin in 2016, and originally published as Pentaphragma pendula. The type specimens are pressed from plants that were cultivated in a Hong Kong greenhouse.

== Distribution ==
Pentaphragma pendulum is native to the wet tropical biome of Sarawak, Borneo. It is endemic to Kuching Division.

The species grows on riverbanks and limestone hills, in mixed dipterocarp forests, at elevations of around 100 metres (330 ft).

== Description ==
Pentaphragma pendulum is a climbing plant, or a fleshy herb with branches that grow horizontally along the ground. The stem can be over 15 centimetres (5.9 in) long.

The leaves are almost circular or widely ovate, 9–15 centimetres (3.5–5.9 in) long, 8–12 centimetres (3.1–4.7 in) wide, and have 1.5–3 centimetres (0.59–1.18 in) stems. The leaves are arranged alternately, dark green, and have silvery edges.

The inflorescences are bent downwards, have five to twelve flowers, and grow on 1–2 centimetres (0.39–0.79 in) stems. The flowers are 2.3–3.8 centimetres (0.91–1.50 in) long, and have stems that are around 5 millimetres (0.20 in) long. The calyx has five pale green lobes, which are oblong to narrowly ovate or spoon-shaped. The corolla is a cream-yellow to pale yellowish-green tube, which is 6–9 millimetres (0.24–0.35 in) long, 4–5 millimetres (0.16–0.20 in) wide, and has five curved lobes, which are fused together. The flowers have five stamens. The hypanthium is rod-shaped, 18–23 millimetres (0.71–0.91 in) long, and 3.5–5 millimetres (0.14–0.20 in) wide.

Pentaphragma pendulum is similar to Pentaphragma longisepalum.

== Etymology ==
The specific epithet refers to the hanging inflorescence.
