= Baphia longipedicellata =

Conservation status
- Vulnerable (IUCN 3.1)

Scientific classification
- Kingdom: Plantae
- Clade: Tracheophytes
- Clade: Angiosperms
- Clade: Eudicots
- Clade: Rosids
- Order: Fabales
- Family: Fabaceae
- Subfamily: Faboideae
- Genus: Baphia
- Species: B. longipedicellata

Binomial name
- Baphia longipedicellata De Wild.

Subspecies
- Baphia longipedicellata subsp. keniensis (Brummitt) Soladoye; Baphia longipedicellata subsp. longipedicellata De Wild.
- Range of Baphia longipedicellata.: Baphia longipedicellata subsp. longipedicellata; Baphia longipedicellata subsp. keniensis

Synonyms
- subsp. keniensis: Baphia keniensis Brummitt; subsp. longipedicellata: Baphia gracilipedicellata De Wild.

Species of legume

Baphia longipedicellata is a species of plant in the family Fabaceae. Subspecies keniensis is found only in Kenya and is threatened by habitat loss.
