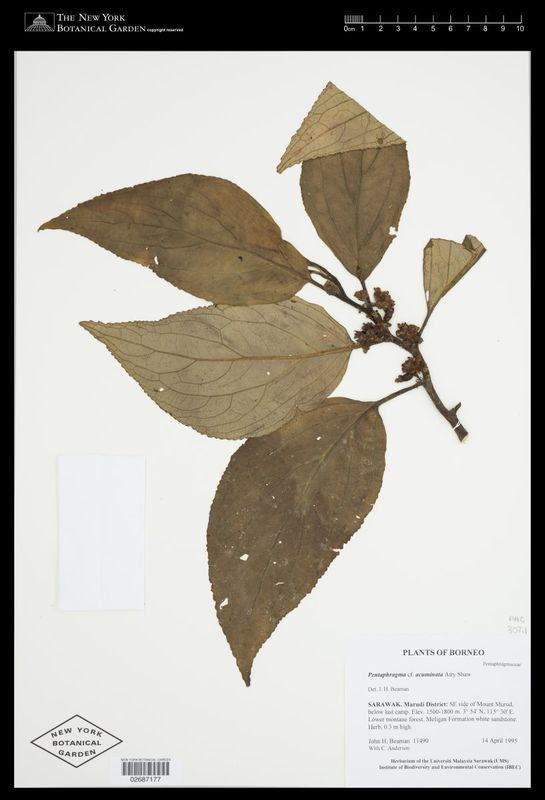

Scientific classification
- Kingdom: Plantae
- Clade: Embryophytes
- Clade: Tracheophytes
- Clade: Spermatophytes
- Clade: Angiosperms
- Clade: Eudicots
- Clade: Asterids
- Order: Asterales
- Family: Pentaphragmataceae
- Genus: Pentaphragma
- Species: P. acuminatum

Binomial name
- Pentaphragma acuminatum Airy Shaw

= Pentaphragma acuminatum =

Species of flowering plant

Pentaphragma acuminatum is a species of flowering plant in the family Pentaphragmataceae. It is native to Borneo, and was described in 1953.

P. acuminatum ia a perennial plant with small inflorescences.

== Taxonomy ==
The species was described by Herbert Kenneth Airy Shaw in 1953.

== Distribution ==
Pentaphragma acuminatum is native to the wet tropical biome of Borneo.

== Description ==
Pentaphragma acuminatum is a perennial plant. The plants are usually almost completely smooth. The stalk is 12–30 centimetres (4.7–11.8 in) tall. The leaves are ovate to lanceolate, 8–15 centimetres (3.1–5.9 in) long, and 3–5 centimetres (1.2–2.0 in) wide.

The inflorescences are small, and have few flowers. The flowers are around 1 centimetre (0.39 in) long. The floral cup is 5–6 millimetres (0.20–0.24 in) long. The petals are around 3 millimetres (0.12 in) long.

The fruits are 7–8 millimetres (0.28–0.31 in) long, and 4–5 millimetres (0.16–0.20 in) wide.
