= Baphia abyssinica =

Conservation status
- Vulnerable (IUCN 2.3)

Scientific classification
- Kingdom: Plantae
- Clade: Tracheophytes
- Clade: Angiosperms
- Clade: Eudicots
- Clade: Rosids
- Order: Fabales
- Family: Fabaceae
- Subfamily: Faboideae
- Genus: Baphia
- Species: B. abyssinica

Binomial name
- Baphia abyssinica Brummitt
- The distribution of Baphia abyssinica.

Species of legume

Baphia abyssinica is a species of flowering tree in the family Fabaceae. It is found in western Ethiopia and Sudan. It is threatened by habitat loss, categorized as "vulnerable".

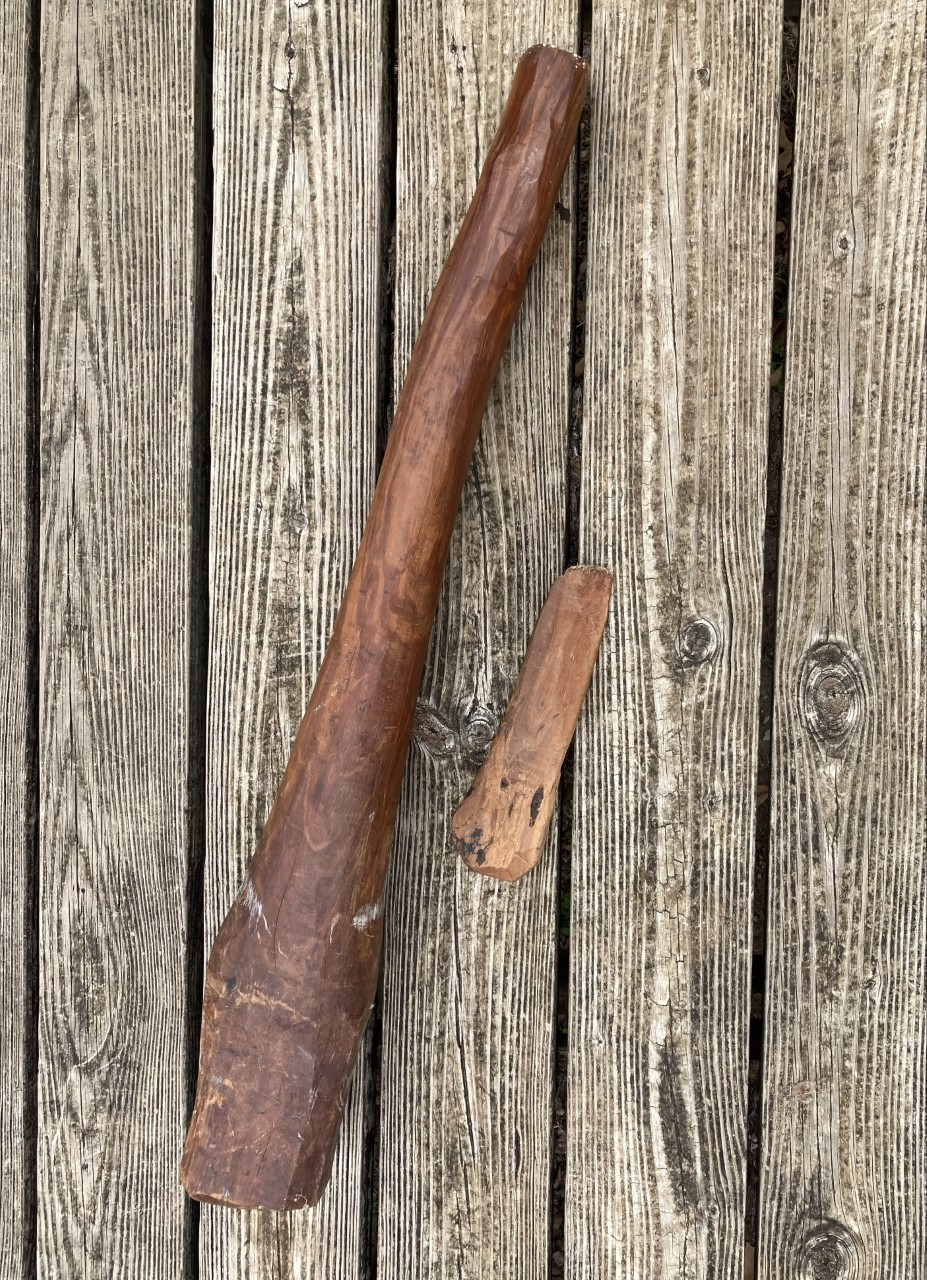
Mallet (81 cm) and wedge made of Baphia abyssinica

In Ethiopia, the Amharic and Shakacho language name for the tree is shifu. In the Majang language it is known as duwe. Twigs from this tree are used for brushing teeth and fighting tooth infections. The wood is hard and is used for tools, such as for mallets. It is also used for house construction.
