= Baphia cymosa =

Scientific classification
- Kingdom: Plantae
- Clade: Tracheophytes
- Clade: Angiosperms
- Clade: Eudicots
- Clade: Rosids
- Order: Fabales
- Family: Fabaceae
- Subfamily: Faboideae
- Genus: Baphia
- Species: B. cymosa

Binomial name
- Baphia cymosa Breteler

Species of legume

Baphia cymosa is a plant species native to Gabon in central Africa. The plant grows there in tropical rainforest.

Baphia cymosa is a small tree up to 4 m tall. Leaves are simple, broadly elliptical, tapering at the tip, glabrous on the upper side but with a few light hairs on the underside. Flowers are white, borne in small groups.
