= Baphia speciosa =

Conservation status
- Endangered (IUCN 3.1)

Scientific classification
- Kingdom: Plantae
- Clade: Tracheophytes
- Clade: Angiosperms
- Clade: Eudicots
- Clade: Rosids
- Order: Fabales
- Family: Fabaceae
- Subfamily: Faboideae
- Genus: Baphia
- Species: B. speciosa

Binomial name
- Baphia speciosa J.B.Gillett & Brummitt
- The distribution of Baphia speciosa

Synonyms
- Baphia sp. 2 sensu White

Species of legume

Baphia speciosa is a species of plant in the family Fabaceae. It is found only in Zambia.
