= Gonystylus pendulus =

Conservation status
- Critically Endangered (IUCN 3.1)

Scientific classification
- Kingdom: Plantae
- Clade: Tracheophytes
- Clade: Angiosperms
- Clade: Eudicots
- Clade: Rosids
- Order: Malvales
- Family: Thymelaeaceae
- Genus: Gonystylus
- Species: G. pendulus

Binomial name
- Gonystylus pendulus Airy Shaw

Endangered species of ramin tree from Borneo

Gonystylus pendulus is a species of plant in the Thymelaeaceae family. It is a tree endemic to Borneo where it is confined to Sarawak.
