= Bobgunnia fistuloides =

Conservation status
- Least Concern (IUCN 3.1)

Scientific classification
- Kingdom: Plantae
- Clade: Tracheophytes
- Clade: Angiosperms
- Clade: Eudicots
- Clade: Rosids
- Order: Fabales
- Family: Fabaceae
- Subfamily: Faboideae
- Genus: Bobgunnia
- Species: B. fistuloides

Binomial name
- Bobgunnia fistuloides (Harms) J.H.Kirkbr. & Wiersema

Synonyms
- Swartzia fistuloides Harms

Species of legume

Bobgunnia fistuloides, synonym Swartzia fistuloides, is a species of legume in the family Fabaceae. It is native to west and west-central tropical Africa. Sometimes sold as "Pau Rosa", along with Bobgunnia madagascariensis.

== Distribution ==
Bobgunnia fistuloides is native to west tropical Africa (Ghana, Guinea, Ivory Coast, Liberia and Nigeria) and to west-central tropical Africa (Cabinda Province, Cameroon, the Central African Republic, the Republic of the Congo, Equatorial Guinea, Gabon and the Democratic Republic of the Congo).
