= Baphiopsis =

Conservation status
- Least Concern (IUCN 3.1)

Scientific classification
- Kingdom: Plantae
- Clade: Tracheophytes
- Clade: Angiosperms
- Clade: Eudicots
- Clade: Rosids
- Order: Fabales
- Family: Fabaceae
- Subfamily: Faboideae
- Tribe: Baphieae
- Genus: Baphiopsis; Benth. ex Baker (1871)
- Species: B. parviflora

Binomial name
- Baphiopsis parviflora Benth. ex Baker (1871)

Synonyms
- Baphia radcliffei Baker f. (1905); Baphiopsis parviflora var. setulosa Yakovlev (1977); Baphiopsis parviflora subsp. villosa Yakovlev (1977); Baphiopsis parviflora var. villosa Yakovlev (1977); Baphiopsis stuhlmannii Taub. (1894)

Genus of legumes

Baphiopsis parviflora is an African species of flowering plants in the legume family, Fabaceae. It is the sole species in genus Baphiopsis. It is a shrub or tree which ranges from Cameroon to Tanzania and Angola.

It belongs to the subfamily Faboideae. It is the only member of the genus Baphiopsis. It was traditionally assigned to the tribe Swartzieae; however, recent molecular phylogenetic analyses reassigned Baphiopsis parviflora into the Baphieae tribe.
