= Gonystylus borneensis =

Conservation status
- Least Concern (IUCN 3.1)

Scientific classification
- Kingdom: Plantae
- Clade: Tracheophytes
- Clade: Angiosperms
- Clade: Eudicots
- Clade: Rosids
- Order: Malvales
- Family: Thymelaeaceae
- Genus: Gonystylus
- Species: G. borneensis

Binomial name
- Gonystylus borneensis (Tiegh.) Gilg

Synonyms
- Asclerum borneense Tiegh.

Species of ramin tree

Gonystylus borneensis is a flowering plant in the family Thymelaeaceae. It is native to Borneo.

== Description ==
Gonystylus borneensis grows as a tree up to 35 m (115 ft) tall, with a trunk diameter of up to 60 cm (24 in). The bark is greyish brown and fissured. The fruit is round, brown, up to 7 cm (2.8 in) in diameter.

== Taxonomy ==
Gonystylus borneensis was first described as Asclerum borneense in 1893 by French botanist Phillippe Édouard Léon van Tieghem in the Annales des Sciences Naturelles; Botanique. In 1897, German botanist Ernest Friedrich Gilg transferred the species to the geuns Gonystylus. The type specimen was collected on Mount Matang in Sarawak, Borneo. The specific epithet borneensis means 'of Borneo'.

== Distribution and habitat ==
Gonystylus borneensis is endemic to Borneo. Its habitat is in dipterocarp and kerangas forests from sea level to 500 m (1,600 ft) altitude.

== Conservation ==
Gonystylus borneensis has been assessed as least concern on the IUCN Red List. However, its population is decreasing due to deforestation of land for palm oil plantations. The species is not known from any protected areas.
