= Pentaphragma spicatum =

Scientific classification
- Kingdom: Plantae
- Clade: Tracheophytes
- Clade: Angiosperms
- Clade: Eudicots
- Clade: Asterids
- Order: Asterales
- Family: Pentaphragmataceae
- Genus: Pentaphragma
- Species: P. spicatum

Binomial name
- Pentaphragma spicatum Merr.

Synonyms
- Pentaphragma corniculatum Chun & F.Chun

Species of flowering plant

Pentaphragma spicatum is a species of flowering plant in the family Pentaphragmataceae. It is a perennial herb with asymmetrical leaves, white or yellow-green flowers, and ellipsoid berries. The species is native to China, and was described in 1922.

== Taxonomy ==
The species was described by Elmer Drew Merrill in 1922.

== Distribution ==
Pentaphragma spicatum is native to the subtropical biome of south-east China (southern Guangxi and Guangdong) and Hainan. Its range may extend into northern Vietnam. The species grows in ravines, in dense tropical forests, at elevations of around 1,400 metres (4,600 ft).

== Description ==
Pentaphragma spicatum is a perennial herb. The stems grow to around 6 centimetres (2.4 in) high. The stems, leaves, bracts, and calyx are densely covered with hairs. The rhizomes are oblique, elongated, up to 15 centimetres (5.9 in) long and 1.5 centimetres (0.59 in) wide, and more or less woody. The roots are fibrous, and around 2 millimetres (0.079 in) wide.

The leaves are papery, asymmetrical, ovate or ovate-orbicular, 10–30 centimetres (3.9–11.8 in) long, 6–20 centimetres (2.4–7.9 in) wide, and have smooth or toothed edges. The leaf stems are 5–15 centimetres (2.0–5.9 in) long.

The inflorescence is a 4–5 centimetres (1.6–2.0 in) long spike. The inflorescences are solitary or in pairs. The inflorescence stem is around 3 centimetres (1.2 in) long. The flowers grow on 1–2 millimetres (0.039–0.079 in) long stems. The flowers are around 1.6 centimetres (0.63 in) long. The calyx tube is bell-shaped, around 8 millimetres (0.31 in) long and 4–5 millimetres (0.16–0.20 in) wide, and has lobes which are around 5 millimetres (0.20 in) long. The corolla is white or yellow-green, and around 9 millimetres (0.35 in) long. The petals are oblong, and 5–6 millimetres (0.20–0.24 in) long. The plant flowers from May to July.

The fruit is an ellipsoid berry, which is around 8 millimetres (0.31 in) long. The seeds are ovoid, dark brown, and around 0.3 millimetres (0.012 in) long. The plant fruits from October to November.

== Nomenlature ==
In Chinese, the species is known as 直序五膜草 (zhi xu wu mo cao).
