= Gonystylus forbesii =

Conservation status
- Near Threatened (IUCN 3.1)

Scientific classification
- Kingdom: Plantae
- Clade: Tracheophytes
- Clade: Angiosperms
- Clade: Eudicots
- Clade: Rosids
- Order: Malvales
- Family: Thymelaeaceae
- Genus: Gonystylus
- Species: G. forbesii

Binomial name
- Gonystylus forbesii Gilg

Synonyms
- Gonystylus warburgianus Gilg ex Domke

Species of ramin tree

Gonystylus forbesii is a tree in the family Thymelaeaceae.

== Description ==
Gonystylus forbesii grows as a tree up to 50 metres (160 ft) tall, with a trunk diameter of up to 80 cm (30 in). The bark is greyish brown. Its flowers are reddish yellow. The fruit is dark brown, up to 4 cm (2 in) long.

== Distribution and habitat ==
Gonystylus forbesii is native to Sumatra and Borneo. Its habitat is mixed dipterocarp, submontane and kerangas forest to 1,800 m (6,000 ft) altitude.

== Conservation ==
Gonystylus forbesii has been assessed as near threatened on the IUCN Red List. The species is threatened by logging for timber and by conversion of land for agriculture, especially palm oil plantations.
