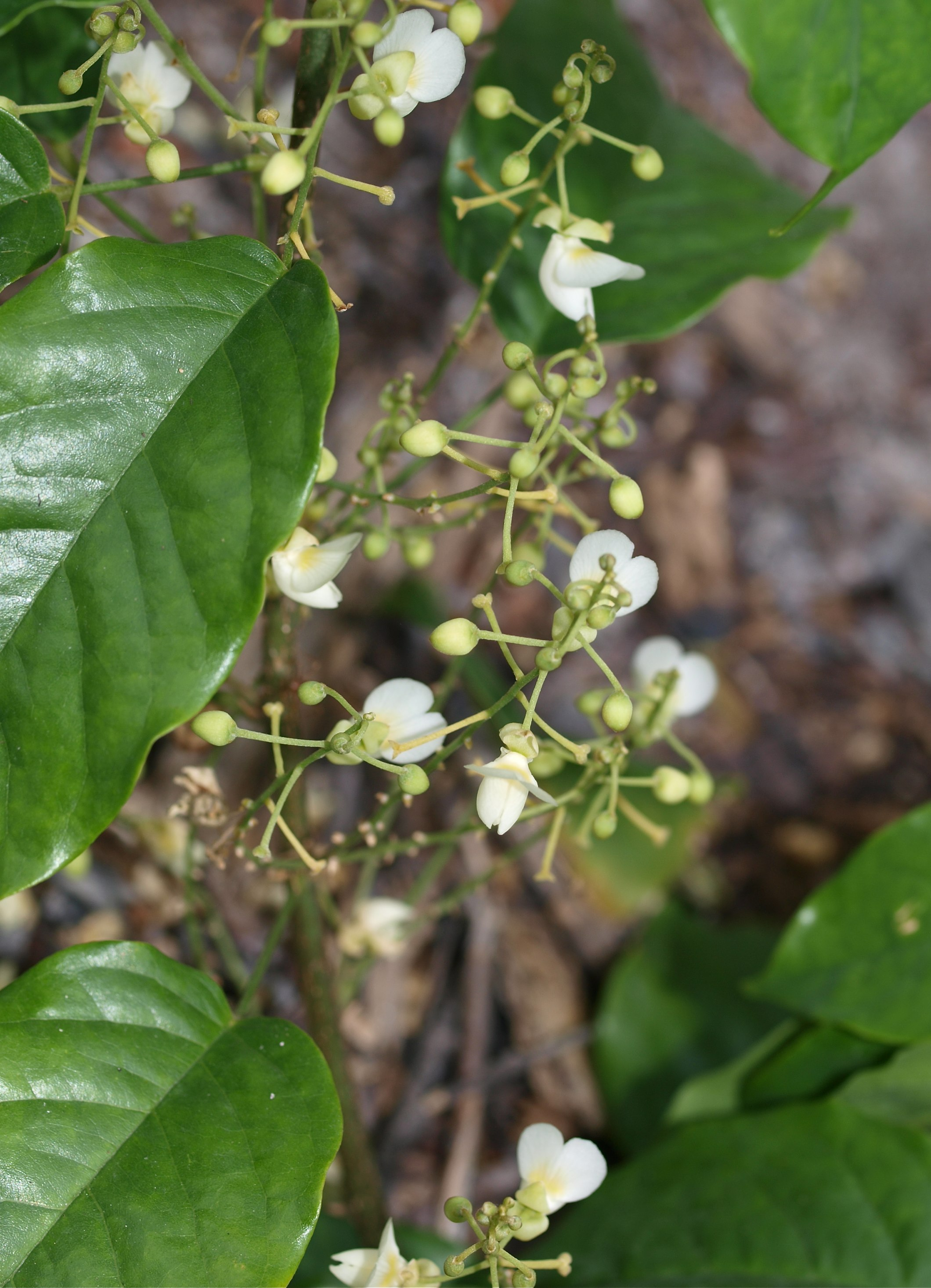
- Airyantha schweinfurthii

Scientific classification
- Kingdom: Plantae
- Clade: Tracheophytes
- Clade: Angiosperms
- Clade: Eudicots
- Clade: Rosids
- Order: Fabales
- Family: Fabaceae
- Subfamily: Faboideae
- Tribe: Baphieae
- Genus: Airyantha; Brummitt (1968)

Species and subspecies
- Airyantha borneensis (Oliv.) Brummitt; Airyantha schweinfurthii (Taub.) Brummitt; subsp. confusa (Hutch. & Dalziel) Brummitt; subsp. schweinfurthii Brummitt

= Airyantha =

Genus of legumes

Airyantha is a small genus of flowering plants in the legume family, Fabaceae. It belongs to the subfamily Faboideae. It was named after the botanist Herbert Kenneth Airy Shaw. It was traditionally assigned to the tribe Sophoreae; however, recent molecular phylogenetic analyses reassigned Airyantha into the Baphieae tribe.

The genus contains two accepted species:

- Airyantha borneensis (Oliv.) Brummitt – Borneo and Philippines
- Airyantha schweinfurthii (Taub.) Brummitt – western and west-central tropical Africa, from Côte d'Ivoire to Democratic Republic of the Congo.
