= Baphia macrocalyx =

Conservation status
- Vulnerable (IUCN 3.1)

Scientific classification
- Kingdom: Plantae
- Clade: Tracheophytes
- Clade: Angiosperms
- Clade: Eudicots
- Clade: Rosids
- Order: Fabales
- Family: Fabaceae
- Subfamily: Faboideae
- Genus: Baphia
- Species: B. macrocalyx

Binomial name
- Baphia macrocalyx Harms
- The distribution of Baphia macrocalyx.

Synonyms
- Baphia mocimboensis P. Lima

Species of legume

Baphia macrocalyx is a species of plant in the family Fabaceae. It is found in Mozambique and Tanzania. It is threatened by habitat loss.
