= Bobgunnia =

Scientific classification
- Kingdom: Plantae
- Clade: Tracheophytes
- Clade: Angiosperms
- Clade: Eudicots
- Clade: Rosids
- Order: Fabales
- Family: Fabaceae
- Subfamily: Faboideae
- Tribe: Swartzieae
- Genus: Bobgunnia; J.H.Kirkbr. & Wiersema (1997)

Species
- Bobgunnia fistuloides (Harms) J.H.Kirkbr. & Wiersema; Bobgunnia madagascariensis (Desv.) J.H.Kirkbr. & Wiersema

Genus of legumes

Bobgunnia is a genus of flowering plants in the legume family, Fabaceae. It belongs to the subfamily Faboideae. It includes two species native to sub-Saharan Africa. The genus is named for Charles R. Gunn who was the director of the U.S. National Seed Herbarium for many years before his retirement.

- Bobgunnia fistuloides (Harms) J.H.Kirkbr. & Wiersema – western and central Africa, from Guinea to the Central African Republic and Democratic Republic of the Congo
- Bobgunnia madagascariensis (Desv.) J.H.Kirkbr. & Wiersema – western, central, and southern Africa, from Guinea to Chad, Tanzania, northern South Africa, and Namibia.

Both of these are sometimes sold as Pau Rosa.
