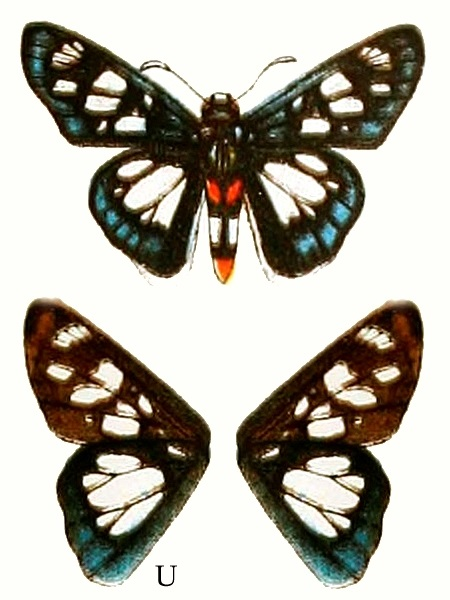

Scientific classification
- Kingdom: Animalia
- Phylum: Arthropoda
- Class: Insecta
- Order: Lepidoptera
- Family: Hesperiidae
- Genus: Abantis
- Species: A. zambesiaca

Binomial name
- Abantis zambesiaca (Westwood, 1874)

Synonyms
- Hesperia (Oxynetra) zambesiaca Westwood, 1874; Sapaea trimeni Butler, 1895

= Abantis zambesiaca =

Zambezi paradise skipper

Species of butterfly

Abantis zambesiaca, the Zambezi paradise skipper, is a butterfly in the family Hesperiidae. It is found in western and southern Tanzania, the Democratic Republic of Congo (Shaba), Zambia, Malawi, Namibia (Caprivi), Mozambique and Zimbabwe. The habitat consists of savanna and Brachystegia woodland.

Adults are attracted to flowers and adult males mud-puddle. Adults are on wing from August to November and from February to May.

The larvae feed on Pericopsis angolensis and Swartzia madagascariensis.
