= Gonystylus =

Conservation status
- CITES Appendix II (CITES)

Scientific classification
- Kingdom: Plantae
- Clade: Tracheophytes
- Clade: Angiosperms
- Clade: Eudicots
- Clade: Rosids
- Order: Malvales
- Family: Thymelaeaceae
- Subfamily: Octolepidoideae
- Genus: Gonystylus; Teijsmann & Binnendijk

Species
- See text

Genus of hardwood trees

Gonystylus is a southeast Asian genus of about 30 species of hardwood trees also known as ramin, melawis (Malay) and ramin telur (Sarawak).

== Description ==
Ramin is native to Malaysia, Singapore, Indonesia, Brunei, the Philippines, and Papua New Guinea, with the highest species diversity on Borneo. It is related to Arnhemia, Deltaria, Lethedon and Solmsia.

Ramin is a medium-sized tree, attaining a height of about 24 m (80 ft) with a straight, clear (branch-free), unbuttressed bole about 18 m (60 ft) long and 60 cm (2 ft) in diameter. The trees are slow-growing, occurring mainly in swamp forests.

== Species ==
As of February 2014 The Plant List recognises 32 accepted species:

- Gonystylus acuminatus Airy Shaw
- Gonystylus affinis Radlk.
- Gonystylus areolatus Domke ex Airy Shaw
- Gonystylus augescens Ridl.
- Gonystylus bancanus (Miq.) Kurz
- Gonystylus borneensis (Tiegh.) Gilg
- Gonystylus brunnescens Airy Shaw
- Gonystylus calophylloides Airy Shaw
- Gonystylus calophyllus Gilg
- Gonystylus confusus Airy Shaw
- Gonystylus consanguineus Airy Shaw
- Gonystylus costalis Airy Shaw
- Gonystylus decipiens Airy Shaw
- Gonystylus eximius Airy Shaw
- Gonystylus forbesii Gilg
- Gonystylus glaucescens Airy Shaw
- Gonystylus keithii Airy Shaw
- Gonystylus lucidulus Airy Shaw
- Gonystylus macrocarpus C.T.White
- Gonystylus macrophyllus (Miq.) Airy Shaw
- Gonystylus maingayi Hook.f.
- Gonystylus micranthus Airy Shaw
- Gonystylus nervosus Airy Shaw
- Gonystylus nobilis Airy Shaw
- Gonystylus othmanii Tawan
- Gonystylus pendulus Airy Shaw
- Gonystylus punctatus A.C.Sm.
- Gonystylus reticulatus (Elmer) Merr.
- Gonystylus spectabilis Airy Shaw
- Gonystylus stenosepalus Airy Shaw
- Gonystylus velutinus Airy Shaw
- Gonystylus xylocarpus Airy Shaw

== Uses ==
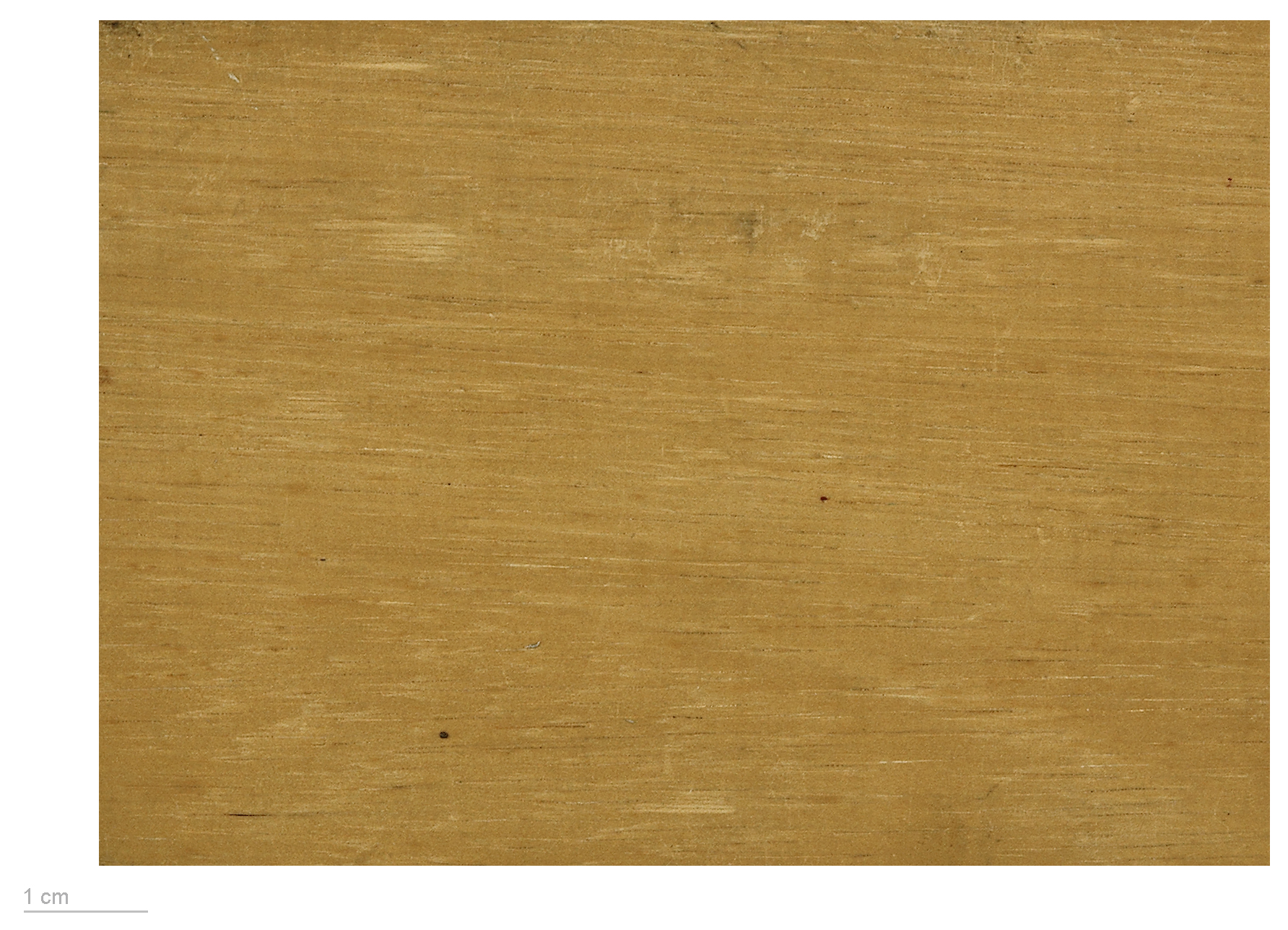
Gonystylus spp. - MHNT

The white wood, harder and lighter in colour than many other hardwoods, is often used in children's furniture, window blinds, dowels, handles, blinds, and decorative mouldings.

Because of its straight, clear grain, nowadays it is commonly used in Venice for the construction of oars.

However, over-exploitation has led to all species of ramin being listed as endangered species, particularly in Indonesia and Malaysia. An estimated 90% of ramin in recent international trade is illegally logged.As the ramin forests themselves come under attack, the fragile ecosystems they support are also at risk. These trees provide the main habitat for other priority species such as the orangutan and the Indochinese, Sumatran and Malayan tigers.

== Sumatra ==
Sumatra's peat swamp forests are an important habitat for ramin trees. The Sumatran ramin tree species are CITES protected species. The logging and trade of ramin has been illegal in Indonesia since 2001. Internationally, any illegal trade in Indonesian ramin is prohibited under the UN Convention on International Trade in Endangered Species (CITES). Indonesian government maps show that 800,000ha (28%) of Sumatra's peat swamp forest was cleared between 2003 and 2009. Some 22% of this clearance was in areas currently allocated to APP's log suppliers.

== See also ==
- Asia Pulp & Paper
