= Baphia heudelotiana =

Conservation status
- Vulnerable (IUCN 3.1)

Scientific classification
- Kingdom: Plantae
- Clade: Tracheophytes
- Clade: Angiosperms
- Clade: Eudicots
- Clade: Rosids
- Order: Fabales
- Family: Fabaceae
- Subfamily: Faboideae
- Genus: Baphia
- Species: B. heudelotiana

Binomial name
- Baphia heudelotiana Baill.
- The distribution of Baphia heudelotiana

Species of legume

Baphia heudelotiana is a species of plant in the family Fabaceae.

It is found in Guinea and Senegal.
