= Gonystylus decipiens =

Conservation status
- Critically Endangered (IUCN 3.1)

Scientific classification
- Kingdom: Plantae
- Clade: Tracheophytes
- Clade: Angiosperms
- Clade: Eudicots
- Clade: Rosids
- Order: Malvales
- Family: Thymelaeaceae
- Genus: Gonystylus
- Species: G. decipiens

Binomial name
- Gonystylus decipiens Airy Shaw

Species of ramin tree

Gonystylus decipiens is a species of tree in the Thymelaeaceae family. It is endemic to Borneo where it is confined to Sarawak.
