= Gonystylus othmanii =

Conservation status
- Vulnerable (IUCN 3.1)

Scientific classification
- Kingdom: Plantae
- Clade: Tracheophytes
- Clade: Angiosperms
- Clade: Eudicots
- Clade: Rosids
- Order: Malvales
- Family: Thymelaeaceae
- Genus: Gonystylus
- Species: G. othmanii

Binomial name
- Gonystylus othmanii Tawan

Species of ramin tree from Borneo

Gonystylus othmanii is a tree in the family Thymelaeaceae.

== Description ==
Gonystylus othmanii grows as a tree up to 10 metres (30 ft) tall, with a trunk diameter of up to 20 cm (8 in). The bark is greyish brown. The fruit is brown, up to 5.5 cm (2 in) long.

== Distribution and habitat ==
Gonystylus othmanii is endemic to Borneo where it is known only from Sarawak. Its habitat is lowland mixed dipterocarp forest or kerangas forest, at altitudes of 30–550 m (100–1,800 ft).
