= Gonystylus augescens =

Conservation status
- Endangered (IUCN 3.1)

Scientific classification
- Kingdom: Plantae
- Clade: Tracheophytes
- Clade: Angiosperms
- Clade: Eudicots
- Clade: Rosids
- Order: Malvales
- Family: Thymelaeaceae
- Genus: Gonystylus
- Species: G. augescens

Binomial name
- Gonystylus augescens Ridl.

Species of flowering plant

Gonystylus augescens is a flowering plant in the family Thymelaeaceae. It is native to Borneo.

== Description ==
Gonystylus augescens grows as a tree up to 30 m (100 ft) tall. The twigs are dark brown. The fruit is ellipsoid, reddish brown, up to 5 cm (2 in) long.

== Taxonomy ==
Gonystylus augescens was first described in 1946 by English botanist Henry Nicholas Ridley in the Kew Bulletin. The lectotype was collected in Sarawak in Borneo. The specific epithet augescens means 'elongating', referring to the inflorescence.

== Distribution and habitat ==
Gonystylus augescens is endemic to Borneo, where it is confined to Sarawak. Its habitat is lowland mixed dipterocarp forest to elevations of 350 m (1,000 ft).

== Conservation ==
Gonystylus augescens has been assessed as endangered on the IUCN Red List. Its habitat is threatened by deforestation and by conversion of land for agriculture. The species is present in one protected area, Kubah National Park.
