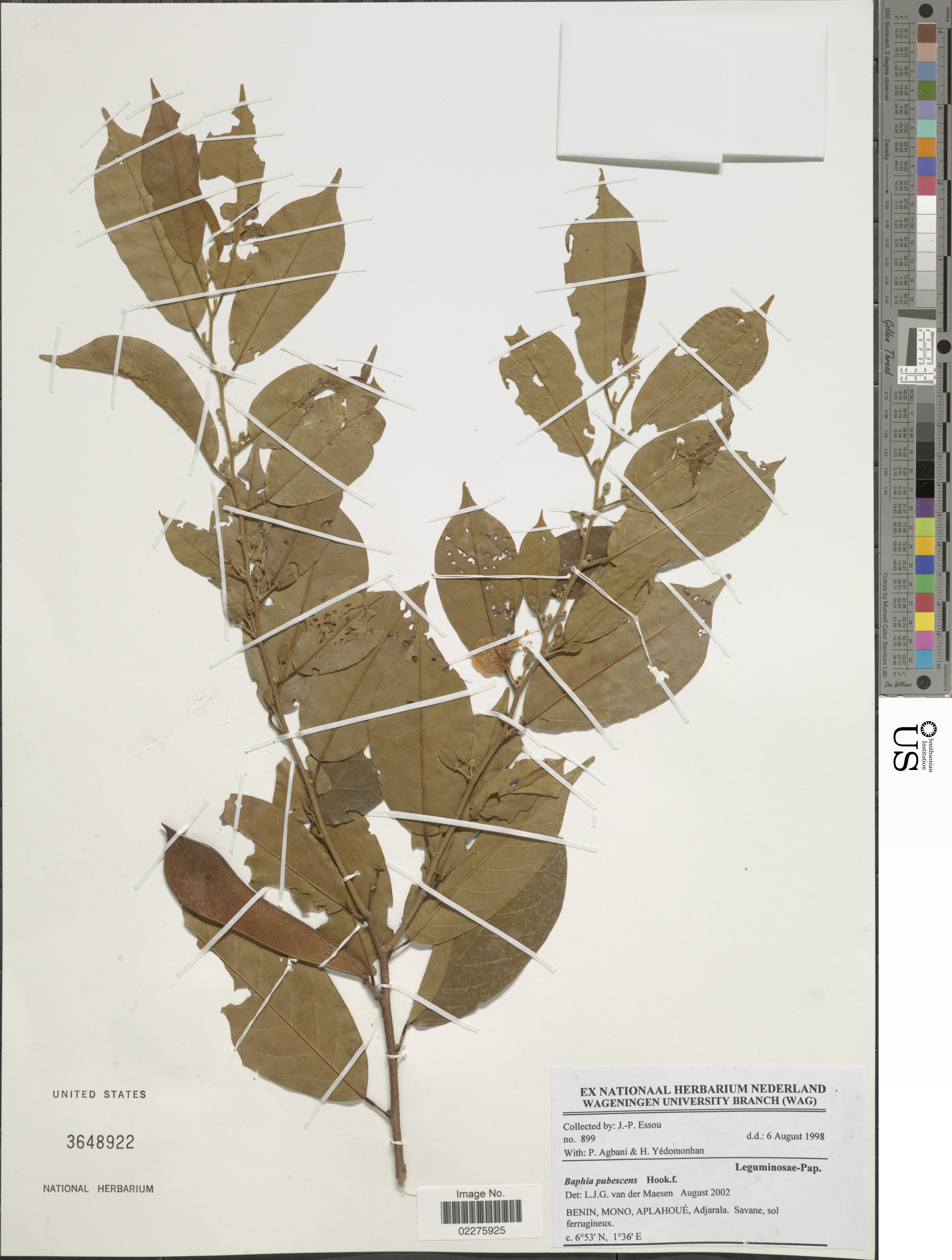
- Baphia pubescens herbarium specimen

Conservation status
- Least Concern (IUCN 3.1)

Scientific classification
- Kingdom: Plantae
- Clade: Tracheophytes
- Clade: Angiosperms
- Clade: Eudicots
- Clade: Rosids
- Order: Fabales
- Family: Fabaceae
- Subfamily: Faboideae
- Genus: Baphia
- Species: B. pubescens

Binomial name
- Baphia pubescens Hook.f
- The distribution of Baphia pubescens

= Baphia pubescens =

Species of plant

Baphia pubescens is a medium size tree common in Guineo-Congolian forest. It is known as odwenkobiri in the Akan language of Ghana.

It is a pioneer species associated with acidic soils in Ghana. It thrives in the forest understory.

There are medicinal uses for the bark, bark oil, and sap of the tree, as they are said to be antirheumatic and a diuretic. The wood is used to produce dye and for carpentry.
