= Gonystylus nervosus =

Conservation status
- Vulnerable (IUCN 2.3)

Scientific classification
- Kingdom: Plantae
- Clade: Tracheophytes
- Clade: Angiosperms
- Clade: Eudicots
- Clade: Rosids
- Order: Malvales
- Family: Thymelaeaceae
- Genus: Gonystylus
- Species: G. nervosus

Binomial name
- Gonystylus nervosus Airy Shaw

Species of ramin tree from Borneo

Gonystylus nervosus is a species of plant in the Thymelaeaceae family. It is a tree endemic to Borneo where it is confined to Sarawak.
