= Baphia latiloi =

Conservation status
- Vulnerable (IUCN 3.1)

Scientific classification
- Kingdom: Plantae
- Clade: Tracheophytes
- Clade: Angiosperms
- Clade: Eudicots
- Clade: Rosids
- Order: Fabales
- Family: Fabaceae
- Subfamily: Faboideae
- Genus: Baphia
- Species: B. latiloi

Binomial name
- Baphia latiloi Soladoye
- The distribution of Baphia latiloi.

Synonyms
- Baphia sp. A sensu Hepper

Species of legume

Baphia latiloi is a species of plant in the family Fabaceae. It is found in Cameroon and Nigeria. It is threatened by habitat loss.
