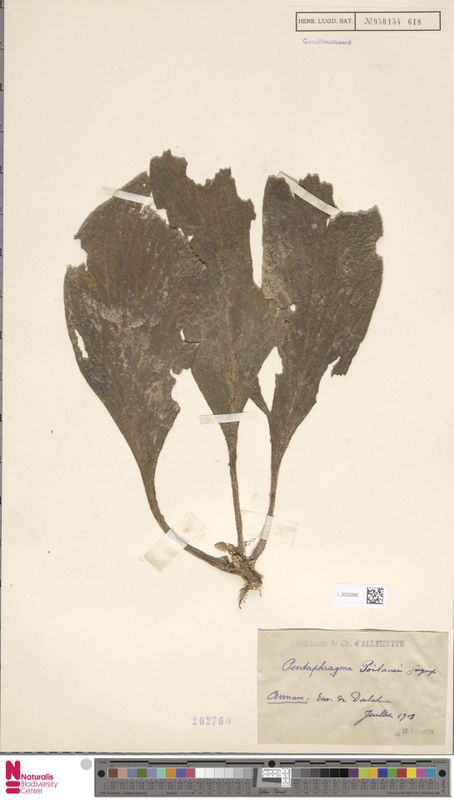

Scientific classification
- Kingdom: Plantae
- Clade: Embryophytes
- Clade: Tracheophytes
- Clade: Angiosperms
- Clade: Eudicots
- Clade: Asterids
- Order: Asterales
- Family: Pentaphragmataceae
- Genus: Pentaphragma
- Species: P. poilanei

Binomial name
- Pentaphragma poilanei (Gagnep.) Gagnep.

Synonyms
- Francfleurya poilanei Gagnep.

= Pentaphragma poilanei =

Species of flowering plant

Pentaphragma poilanei is a species of flowering plant in the family Pentaphragmataceae. It is a perennial plant with ovate to elliptical leaves, white flowers, and ovoid fruits. The species is native to Thailand and Vietnam, and was described in 1927.

== Taxonomy ==
In 1927, François Gagnepain described Francfleurya poilanei, a synonym of Pentaphragma poilanei. Gagnepain moved the species to Pentaphragma in 1928.

Pentaphragma poilanei was formerly treated as a synonym of Pentaphragma sinense.

== Distribution ==
Pentaphragma poilanei is native to the wet tropical biome of Thailand (south-east) and Vietnam (Quảng Bình, Quảng Trị, Thừa Thiên Huế, and Da Nang). It is also expected to be present in Cambodia. The species grows in moist, shady parts of evergreen forests, near streams, at elevations of 50–1,000 metres (160–3,280 ft).

== Description ==
Pentaphragma poilanei is a perennial plant. The stem can be up to 30 centimetres (12 in) long.

The leaves are ovate to elliptical, somewhat asymmetrical, 12–30 centimetres (4.7–11.8 in) long, and 9–13 centimetres (3.5–5.1 in) wide. The leaf stems are 3.5–10.5 centimetres (1.4–4.1 in) long.

The inflorescences are scorpioid, curved, 4–5 centimetres (1.6–2.0 in) long, and have four to twenty-four flowers. The inflorescences have 2–4 centimetres (0.79–1.57 in) stems, and the flowers have 1.5–3.5 millimetres (0.059–0.138 in) stems. The calyx is white. The tube (including the hypanthium) is 5–6 millimetres (0.20–0.24 in) long, 3–4 millimetres (0.12–0.16 in) wide, and has ovate or oblanceolate lobes. The corolla is white, 5–7 millimetres (0.20–0.28 in) long, and has oblong or lanceolate lobes. The plant flowers from April to October.

The fruits are smooth, ovoid, around 1 centimetre (0.39 in) long, and around 0.5 centimetres (0.20 in) wide. The plant fruits from April to October.

== Uses ==
The young leaves are edible, and reportedly taste similar to Chinese kale.
