= Baphia kirkii =

Conservation status
- Vulnerable (IUCN 2.3)

Scientific classification
- Kingdom: Plantae
- Clade: Tracheophytes
- Clade: Angiosperms
- Clade: Eudicots
- Clade: Rosids
- Order: Fabales
- Family: Fabaceae
- Subfamily: Faboideae
- Genus: Baphia
- Species: B. kirkii

Binomial name
- Baphia kirkii Baker

Subspecies
- subsp. kirkii Baker; subsp. ovata (Sim) Soladoye
- The distribution of Baphia kirkii: Baphia kirkii subsp. kirkii; Baphia kirkii subsp. ovata

Synonyms
- Millettia pyrifolia Vatke

Species of plant

Baphia kirkii is a species of plant in the family Fabaceae. It is found in Mozambique, Tanzania, and possibly Kenya. It is threatened by habitat loss.
