= Pentaphragma narathiwatense =

Scientific classification
- Kingdom: Plantae
- Clade: Embryophytes
- Clade: Tracheophytes
- Clade: Angiosperms
- Clade: Eudicots
- Clade: Asterids
- Order: Asterales
- Family: Pentaphragmataceae
- Genus: Pentaphragma
- Species: P. narathiwatense

Binomial name
- Pentaphragma narathiwatense Poopath & Pooma

Species of flowering plant

Pentaphragma narathiwatense is a species of flowering plant in the family Pentaphragmataceae. It is a perennial plant with slightly asymmetrical leaves, and white flowers. The species is native to Thailand, and was described in 2023.

== Taxonomy ==
The species was described by Manop Poopath and Rachun Pooma in 2023. The type specimen was collected in Hala-Bala Wildlife Sanctuary, Narathiwat Province, Thailand.

== Distribution ==
Pentaphragma narathiwatense is native to the wet tropical biome of peninsular Thailand. It grows in evergreen forests, in moist, shady areas near streams, at elevations of around 150 metres (490 ft).

== Description ==
Pentaphragma narathiwatense is a perennial plant that grows up to 18 centimetres (7.1 in) high. The leaves are slightly asymmetrical at the base, 11–16 centimetres (4.3–6.3 in) long, 7–8.5 centimetres (2.8–3.3 in) wide, and have 3–4 centimetres (1.2–1.6 in) long stems.

The inflorescence is a lax, 1.5–2 centimetres (0.59–0.79 in) long spike, with up to ten flowers. The inflorescence stem is 0.7–1 centimetre (0.28–0.39 in) long. The flowers lack stems. The calyx is white. The corolla is white, spoon-shaped, 2–3 millimetres (0.079–0.118 in) long, 1.5–2 millimetres (0.059–0.079 in) wide, and densely hairy on the outside. The flowers have five stamens.

== Etymology ==
The specific epithet narathiwatense refers to Narathiwat Province, where the type specimen was collected.
