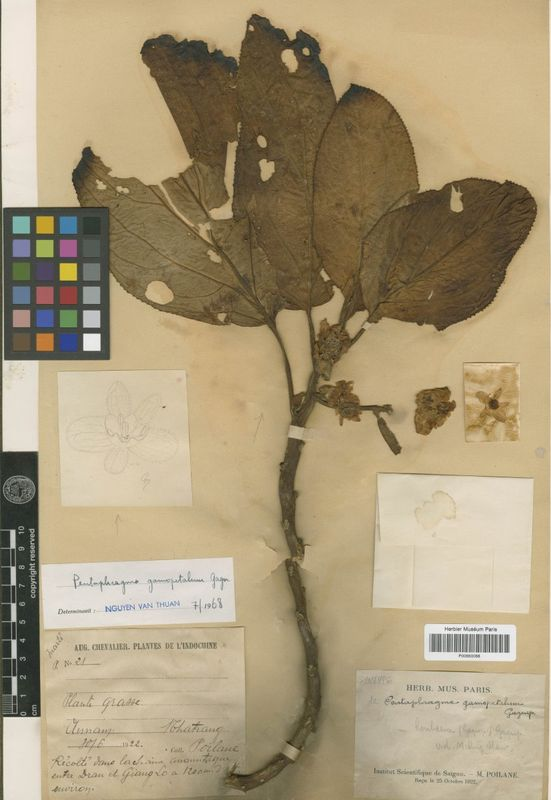

Scientific classification
- Kingdom: Plantae
- Clade: Embryophytes
- Clade: Tracheophytes
- Clade: Spermatophytes
- Clade: Angiosperms
- Clade: Eudicots
- Clade: Asterids
- Order: Asterales
- Family: Pentaphragmataceae
- Genus: Pentaphragma
- Species: P. gamopetalum

Binomial name
- Pentaphragma gamopetalum Gagnep.

= Pentaphragma gamopetalum =

Species of flowering plant

Pentaphragma gamopetalum is a species of flowering plant in the family Pentaphragmataceae.

== Taxonomy ==
The species was described by François Gagnepain in 1928.

== Distribution ==
Pentaphragma gamopetalum is native to the wet tropical biome of Vietnam.
