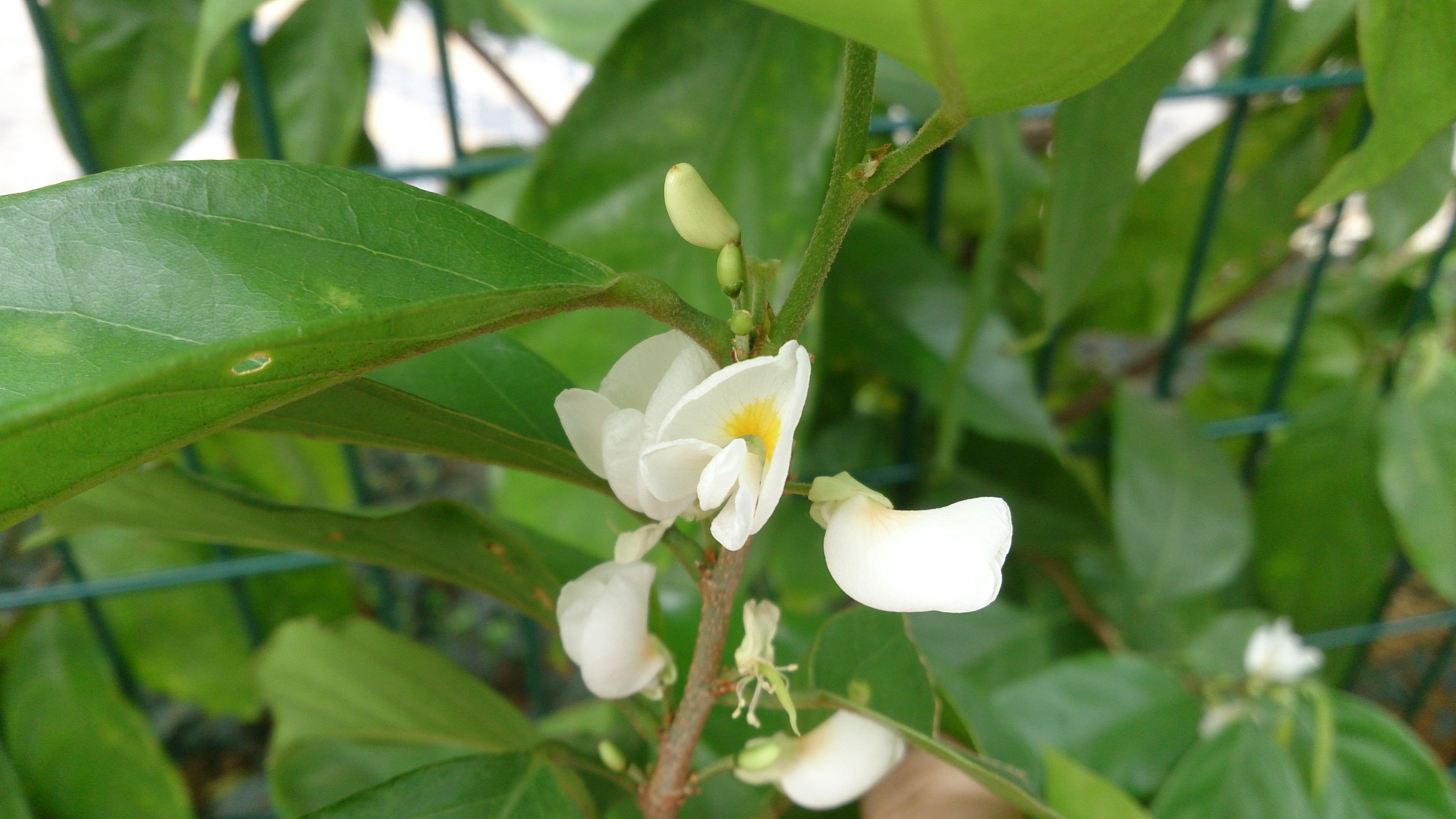
- Baphia nitida

Scientific classification
- Kingdom: Plantae
- Clade: Tracheophytes
- Clade: Angiosperms
- Clade: Eudicots
- Clade: Rosids
- Order: Fabales
- Family: Fabaceae
- Subfamily: Faboideae
- Clade: Meso-Papilionoideae
- Tribe: Baphieae
- Genus: Baphia; Afzel. ex G.Lodd. (1820)

Species
- See text
- Range of the genus Baphia.

Synonyms
- Baphia sect. Delaria (Desv.) Benth.; Delaria Desv. (1826)

= Baphia =

Genus of legumes

Baphia is a small genus of legumes that bear simple leaves. Baphia is from the Greek word βάπτω (báptō-, "to dip" or "to dye"), referring to a red dye that is extracted from the heartwood of tropical species. The genus is restricted to the African tropics. Baphia was traditionally assigned to the tribe Sophoreae; however, recent molecular phylogenetic analyses reassigned Baphia to the tribe Baphieae.

== Species ==
Baphia comprises the following species:

=== Section Alata M.O.Soladoye ===
- Baphia cordifolia Harms

=== Section Baphia Lodd. ===
==== Series Baphia Lodd. ====
- Baphia abyssinica Brummitt
- Baphia dewevrei De Wild.
- Baphia dewildeana M.O.Soladoye
- Baphia latiloi M.O.Soladoye
- Baphia laurifolia Baillon
- Baphia longipedicellata De Wild.
  - subsp. keniensis (Brummitt) M.O.Soladoye
  - subsp. longipedicellata De Wild.
- Baphia mambillensis M.O.Soladoye
- Baphia marceliana De Wild.
  - subsp. marceliana De Wild.
  - subsp. marquesii (M.Exell) M.O.Soladoye
- Baphia nitida Lodd. (Camwood)
- Baphia pauloi Brummitt
- Baphia pubescens Hook.f.
- Baphia puguensis Brummitt
- Baphia punctulata Harms
  - subsp. descampsii (De Wild.) M.O.Soladoye
  - subsp. palmensis M.O.Soladoye
  - subsp. punctulata Harms

==== Series Contiguinae M.O.Soladoye ====
- Baphia angolensis Baker
- Baphia brachybotrys Harms
- Baphia breteleriana M.O.Soladoye
- Baphia buettneri Harms
  - subsp. buettneri Harms
  - subsp. hylophila (Harms) M.O.Soladoye
- Baphia gossweileri Baker f.
- Baphia incerta De Wild.
  - subsp. incerta De Wild.
  - subsp. lebrunii (L.Touss.) M.O.Soladoye
- Baphia leptostemma Baillon
  - subsp. gracilipes (Harms) M.O.Soladoye
    - var. gracilipes (Harms) M.O.Soladoye
    - var. conraui (Harms) M.O.Soladoye
  - subsp. leptostemma Baillon
- Baphia preussii Harms
- Baphia obanensis Baker f.
- Baphia wollastonii Baker f.

==== Series Spathaceae M.O.Soladoye ====
- Baphia eriocalyx Harms
- Baphia spathacea Hook.f.
  - subsp. polyantha (Harms) M.O.Soladoye
  - subsp. spathacea Hook.f.

=== Section Bracteolaria (Hochst.) Benth. ===
- Baphia aurivellera Taubert
- Baphia capparidifolia Baker
  - subsp. bangweolensis (R.E.Fries) Brummitt
  - subsp. capparidifolia Baker
  - subsp. multiflora (Harms) Brummitt
  - subsp. polygalacea Brummitt
- Baphia dubia De Wild.
- Baphia heudelotiana Baillon
- Baphia kirkii Baker
  - subsp. kirkii Baker
  - subsp. ovata (Sim) M.O.Soladoye
- Baphia laurentii De Wild.

=== Section Longibracteolatae (Lester-Garland) M.O.Soladoye ===
==== Series Chrysophyllae M.O.Soladoye ====
- Baphia burttii Baker f.
- Baphia chrysophylla Taubert
  - subsp. chrysophylla Taubert
  - subsp. claessensii (De Wild.) Brummitt
- Baphia cuspidata Taubert
- Baphia massaiensis Taubert
  - subsp. busseana (Harms) M.O.Soladoye
  - subsp. floribunda Brummitt
  - subsp. gomesii (Baker f.) Brummitt
  - subsp. massaiensis Taubert
  - subsp. obovata (Schinz) Brummitt
    - var. cornifolia (Harms) M.O.Soladoye
    - var. obovata (Schinz) M.O.Soladoye
    - var. whitei (Brummitt) M.O.Soladoye
- Baphia speciosa J.B.Gillett & Brummitt

==== Series Macranthae M.O.Soladoye ====
- Baphia bequaertii De Wild.
- Baphia letestui Pellegrin
- Baphia maxima Baker

==== Series Striatae (Lester Garland) M.O.Soladoye ====
- Baphia leptobotrys Harms
  - subsp. leptobotrys Harms
  - subsp. silvatica (Harms) M.O.Soladoye
- Baphia pilosa Baillon
  - subsp. batangensis (Harms) M.O.Soladoye
  - subsp. pilosa Baillon

=== Section Macrobaphia Harms emend. M.O.Soladoye ===
- Baphia bergeri De Wild.
- Baphia macrocalyx Harms
- Baphia semseiana Brummitt

=== Incertae sedis ===
- Baphia cymosa Breteler
- Baphia madagascariensis (A.Heller) A.Heller

== Species names with uncertain taxonomic status ==
The status of the following species is unresolved:

- Baphia glauca A. Chev.
- Baphia longepetiolata Taub.
- Baphia madagascariensis C.H. Stirt. & Du Puy
- Baphia megaphylla Breteler
- Baphia radcliffei Baker f.

In 2023, a new species, Baphia arenicola was discovered growing in the deep sandy highland region of central Angola, part of the Kalahari sands, and was formally described to science. The floral characters most morphologically similar to Baphia massaiensis but with certain characters also comparable to Baphia bequaertii, with all three species found growing in the same region. Preliminary molecular analysis places the new taxon close to Baphia bequaertii. Whilst most Baphia form above ground shrubs and trees, Baphia arenicola grows as a geoxylic suffrutex (often described as "underground trees") with most of its woody tissue growing buried deep within the sand and its flowering parts just above ground level.
