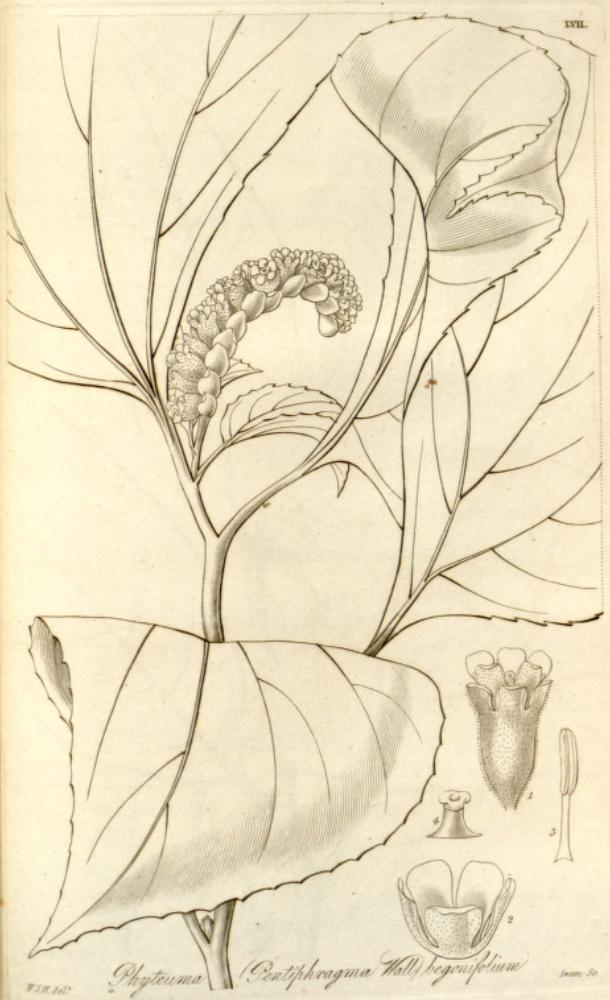
- Pentaphragma begoniaefolium

Scientific classification
- Kingdom: Plantae
- Clade: Embryophytes
- Clade: Tracheophytes
- Clade: Angiosperms
- Clade: Eudicots
- Clade: Asterids
- Order: Asterales
- Family: Pentaphragmataceae; J.Agardh
- Genus: Pentaphragma; Wall. ex G.Don

Species
- See text

Synonyms
- Francfleurya A.Chev. & Gagnep.

= Pentaphragma =

Genus of flowering plants

Pentaphragma is a genus of flowering plants. Pentaphragma is the sole genus in Pentaphragmataceae, a family in the order Asterales. These species are fleshy herbs, with asymmetrical leaf blades. They are found in Southeast Asia. Pentaphragma is rayless, but eventually develops rays in at least one of the species studied. This is interpreted as related to secondary woodiness or upright habit within a predominantly herbaceous phylad. The vessel elements of Pentaphragma have features universally interpreted as primitive in dicotyledons: scalariform perforation plates with numerous bars; pit membrane remnants in perforations; scalariform lateral wall pitting; the genus also has fiber-tracheids with prominently bordered pits. The presence of occasional scalariform perforation plates, often aberrant, in secondary xylem of families of Asterales sensu lato - Campanulaceae, Pentaphragmataceae, Valerianaceae, and even Asteraceae (e.g., certain Lactuceae) - can be attributed to paedomorphosis, extending these plates into secondary xylem from primary xylem. Raylessness in Pentaphragma can be described in terms of secondary woodiness or paedomorphosis. The fact that fiber-tracheids are shorter than vessel elements in Pentaphragma is believed related to raylessness also, because some fiber-tracheids are produced from 'potential' ray areas.

== Species ==
Thirty-two species are accepted as of June 2026.

- Pentaphragma acuminatum
- Pentaphragma albiflorum
- Pentaphragma aurantiacum
- Pentaphragma bartlettii
- Pentaphragma begoniifolium
- Pentaphragma bicolor
- Pentaphragma combretiflorum
- Pentaphragma cyrtandriforme
- Pentaphragma decurrens
- Pentaphragma ellipticum
- Pentaphragma gamopetalum
- Pentaphragma grandiflorum
- Pentaphragma honbaense
- Pentaphragma horsfieldii
- Pentaphragma insigne
- Pentaphragma jaherii
- Pentaphragma lambirense
- Pentaphragma lanuginosum
- Pentaphragma longisepalum
- Pentaphragma mindanaense
- Pentaphragma narathiwatense
- Pentaphragma paucinerve
- Pentaphragma pendulum
- Pentaphragma platyphyllum
- Pentaphragma poilanei
- Pentaphragma prostratum
- Pentaphragma sinense
- Pentaphragma spatulisepalum
- Pentaphragma spicatum
- Pentaphragma tenuiflorum
- Pentaphragma tetrapetalum
- Pentaphragma viride
