= Baphia dewildeana =

Conservation status
- Vulnerable (IUCN 3.1)

Scientific classification
- Kingdom: Plantae
- Clade: Tracheophytes
- Clade: Angiosperms
- Clade: Eudicots
- Clade: Rosids
- Order: Fabales
- Family: Fabaceae
- Subfamily: Faboideae
- Genus: Baphia
- Species: B. dewildeana

Binomial name
- Baphia dewildeana Soladoye
- The distribution of Baphia dewildeana.

Synonyms
- Baphia gracilipes sensu Hepper

Species of legume

Baphia dewildeana is a species of plant in the family Fabaceae. It is found in Cameroon and Nigeria. It is threatened by habitat loss.
