= Gonystylus calophyllus =

Conservation status
- Vulnerable (IUCN 3.1)

Scientific classification
- Kingdom: Plantae
- Clade: Tracheophytes
- Clade: Angiosperms
- Clade: Eudicots
- Clade: Rosids
- Order: Malvales
- Family: Thymelaeaceae
- Genus: Gonystylus
- Species: G. calophyllus

Binomial name
- Gonystylus calophyllus Gilg

Species of ramin tree

Gonystylus calophyllus is a tree in the family Thymelaeaceae. The specific epithet calophyllus means 'beautiful leaves'.

== Description ==
Gonystylus calophyllus grows as a small tree up to 9 metres (30 ft) tall. The twigs are dark brown.

== Distribution and habitat ==
Gonystylus calophyllus is endemic to Borneo, where it is known only from Sarawak. Its habitat is lowland mixed dipterocarp forest. It is threatened by lowland deforestation.
