= Leucomphalos =

Conservation status
- Least Concern (IUCN 3.1)

Scientific classification
- Kingdom: Plantae
- Clade: Tracheophytes
- Clade: Angiosperms
- Clade: Eudicots
- Clade: Rosids
- Order: Fabales
- Family: Fabaceae
- Subfamily: Faboideae
- Tribe: Baphieae
- Genus: Leucomphalos; Benth. (1848)
- Species: L. capparideus

Binomial name
- Leucomphalos capparideus Benth. (1848)

Genus of legumes

Leucomphalos is a genus of flowering plants in the legume family, Fabaceae. It contains a single species, Leucomphalos capparideus, a climbing perennial shrub native to the Guineo-Congolian forest of Nigeria, Cameroon, Equatorial Guinea, Gabon, and the Gulf of Guinea Islands. It belongs to the subfamily Faboideae. Leucomphalos was traditionally assigned to the tribe Sophoreae; however, recent molecular phylogenetic analyses reassigned Leucomphalos to the Baphieae tribe.
