= Gonystylus maingayi =

Conservation status
- Vulnerable (IUCN 3.1)

Scientific classification
- Kingdom: Plantae
- Clade: Tracheophytes
- Clade: Angiosperms
- Clade: Eudicots
- Clade: Rosids
- Order: Malvales
- Family: Thymelaeaceae
- Genus: Gonystylus
- Species: G. maingayi

Binomial name
- Gonystylus maingayi Hook.f.

Species of ramin tree

Gonystylus maingayi is a tree in the family Thymelaeaceae.

== Description ==
Gonystylus maingayi grows as a tree up to 40 metres (130 ft) tall, with a trunk diameter of up to 80 cm (30 in). Its bark is grey to brown. The fruit is round, dark brown, up to 4 cm (2 in) in diameter.

== Distribution and habitat ==
Gonystylus maingayi is native to Sumatra, Peninsular Malaysia, Singapore and Borneo. Its habitat is swamp forests to 290 m (1,000 ft) altitude.
