= Baphia pilosa =

Scientific classification
- Kingdom: Plantae
- Clade: Tracheophytes
- Clade: Angiosperms
- Clade: Eudicots
- Clade: Rosids
- Order: Fabales
- Family: Fabaceae
- Subfamily: Faboideae
- Genus: Baphia
- Species: B. pilosa

Binomial name
- Baphia pilosa Baill. (1866)

Synonyms
- Baphia batangensis Harms (1904); Baphia calophylla Harms (1913); Baphia elegans Lest.-Garl. (1921); Baphia elegans var. vestita Lest.-Garl. (1921); Baphia klainei De Wild. (1919); Baphia klainei var. patulopilosa De Wild. (1919); Baphia pilosa subsp. batangensis (Harms) Soladoye (1985); Baphia vermeulenii De Wild. (1906); Baphiastrum bequaertii De Wild. (1925); Baphiastrum calophylla (Harms) De Wild. (1925); Baphiastrum claessensii De Wild. (1925); Baphiastrum elegans (Lest.-Garl.) De Wild. (1925); Baphiastrum klainei (De Wild.) De Wild. (1925); Baphiastrum klainei var. patulopilosum (De Wild.) De Wild. (1925); Baphiastrum pilosum (Baill.) De Wild. (1925); Baphiastrum vermeulenii (De Wild.) De Wild. (1925)

Species of legume

Baphia pilosa is a species of flowering plant in the legume family, Fabaceae. It is a climber native to Guineo-Congolian forest in west-central Africa, ranging from Cameroon through mainland Equatorial Guinea, Gabon, Republic of the Congo, and Cabinda to the Democratic Republic of the Congo.
