= Gonystylus affinis =

Conservation status
- Vulnerable (IUCN 3.1)

Scientific classification
- Kingdom: Plantae
- Clade: Tracheophytes
- Clade: Angiosperms
- Clade: Eudicots
- Clade: Rosids
- Order: Malvales
- Family: Thymelaeaceae
- Genus: Gonystylus
- Species: G. affinis

Binomial name
- Gonystylus affinis Radlk.

Synonyms
- Gonystylus beccarianus Tiegh.

Species of ramin tree from Southeast Asia

Gonystylus affinis is a tree in the family Thymelaeaceae.

== Description ==
Gonystylus affinis grows as a tree up to 50 metres (160 ft) tall, with a trunk diameter of up to 80 centimetres (30 in). The bark is reddish brown. The fruit is also reddish brown, up to 5 cm (2 in) in diameter.

== Distribution and habitat ==
Gonystylus affinis is native to Peninsular Malaysia and Borneo. Its habitat is lowland forests to 300 m (1,000 ft) altitude.

== Conservation ==
Gonystylus affinis has been assessed as vulnerable on the IUCN Red List. The species is threatened by logging, insufficient replanting and habitat loss to palm oil plantations. In Indonesia, the species is threatened by increasing frequency of fires.
