= Gonystylus keithii =

Conservation status
- Vulnerable (IUCN 2.3)

Scientific classification
- Kingdom: Plantae
- Clade: Tracheophytes
- Clade: Angiosperms
- Clade: Eudicots
- Clade: Rosids
- Order: Malvales
- Family: Thymelaeaceae
- Genus: Gonystylus
- Species: G. keithii

Binomial name
- Gonystylus keithii Airy Shaw

Species of ramin tree

Gonystylus keithii is a species of plant in the family Thymelaeaceae. It is found in Indonesia and Malaysia.
