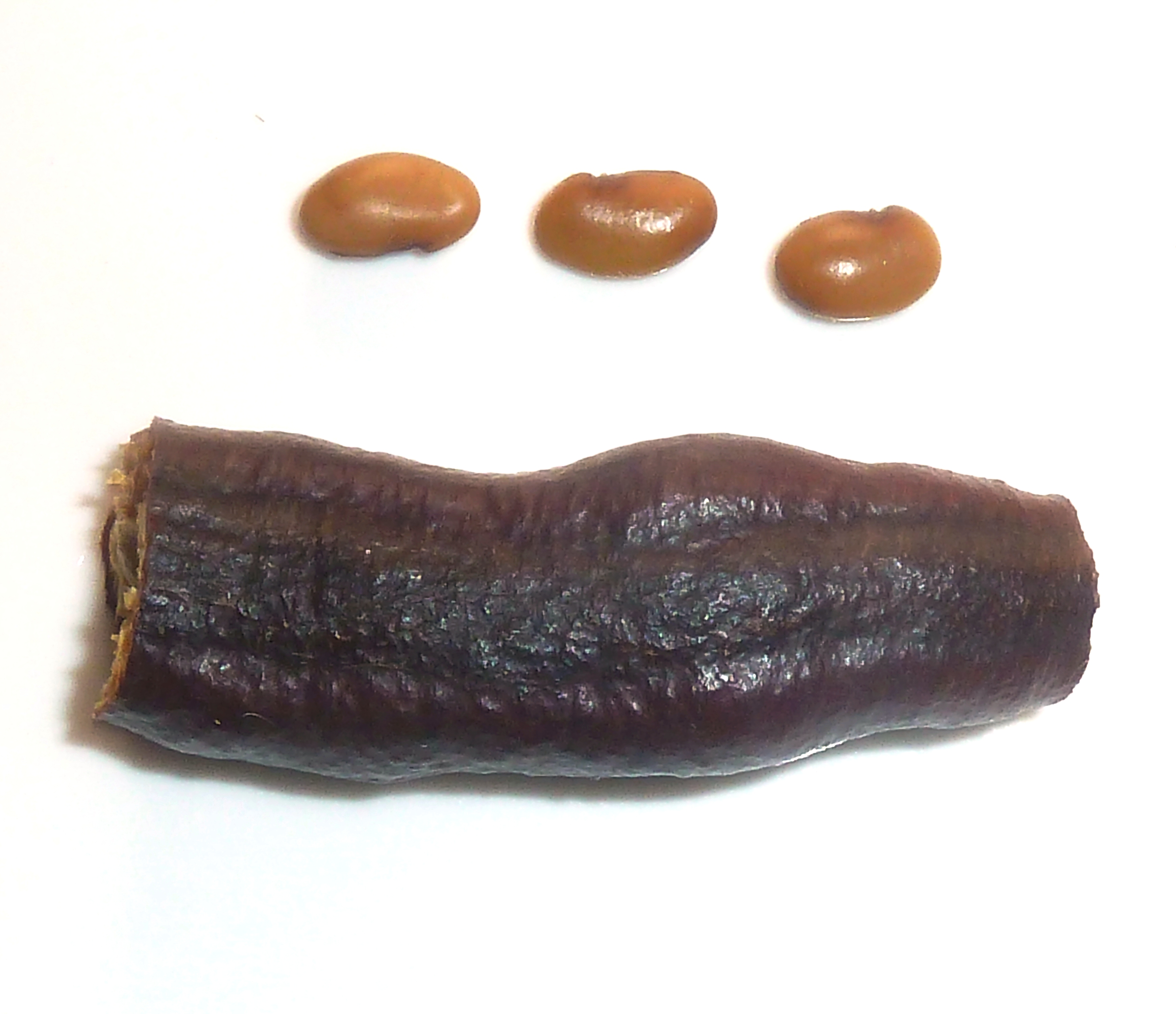
- Pod fragment and seeds

Scientific classification
- Kingdom: Plantae
- Clade: Embryophytes
- Clade: Tracheophytes
- Clade: Spermatophytes
- Clade: Angiosperms
- Clade: Eudicots
- Clade: Rosids
- Order: Fabales
- Family: Fabaceae
- Subfamily: Faboideae
- Genus: Bobgunnia
- Species: B. madagascariensis

Binomial name
- Bobgunnia madagascariensis (Desv.) J.H.Kirkbr. & Wiersema

Synonyms
- Swartzia madagascariensis Desv.; Swartzia marginata Benth.; Swartzia sapini De Wild.

= Bobgunnia madagascariensis =

Species of legume

Bobgunnia madagascariensis (Bambara: samagara), also called the snake bean plant, is a species of legume in the family Fabaceae. Sometimes sold as "Pau Rosa", along with Bobgunnia fistuloides.

== Description ==
Bobgunnia madagascariensis is a small deciduous tree, 3–4 m tall. The plant has large pods that turn dark when ripe.

== Ecology ==
The larvae of Abantis zambesiaca feed on B. madagascariensis.

== Toxicity ==
Bobgunnia madagascarensis is toxic.

=== Applications ===
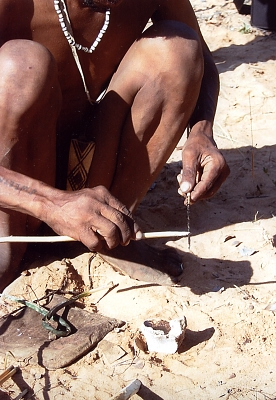
Preparing poison arrows

Poison composed of the roasted seeds of Bobgunnia madagascariensis and innards of the beetle Diamphidia nigroornata is applied to the arrows of the Bushmen. Seeds, fruits and stem bark are also used in fishing by poisoning in Africa.

== Chemistry ==
The methanolic extract of the fruit of B. madagascariensis contains a saponin tetraglycoside.

The root bark of B. madagascariensis contains quinone methide diterpenes.

The seed pod contains two acidic saponins, swartziasaponin A and B and swartziagenin, a mixture of oleanolic and O-acetyloleanolic acid. The pod methanolic extract yields highly glycosylated flavonoids (glycosides of kaempferol and quercetin).

The crude chloroform and methanol extracts of the stem bark of the plant show strong feeding deterrent activity against stored-product insect pest of maize Tribolium castaneum with the two compounds, methyl paraben and lupeol, being identified in these extracts.

Other compounds in B. madagascariensis are (−)-maackiain, (−)-medicarpin, gypsogenin 3-O-rhamnosylglucuronide, (−)-homopterocarpin, pterocarpin, 4-methoxymedicarpin, 4-methoxymaackiain, 4-methoxyhomopterocarpin, 4-methoxypterocarpin, anhydrovariabilin and coumestrol dimethyl ether.
