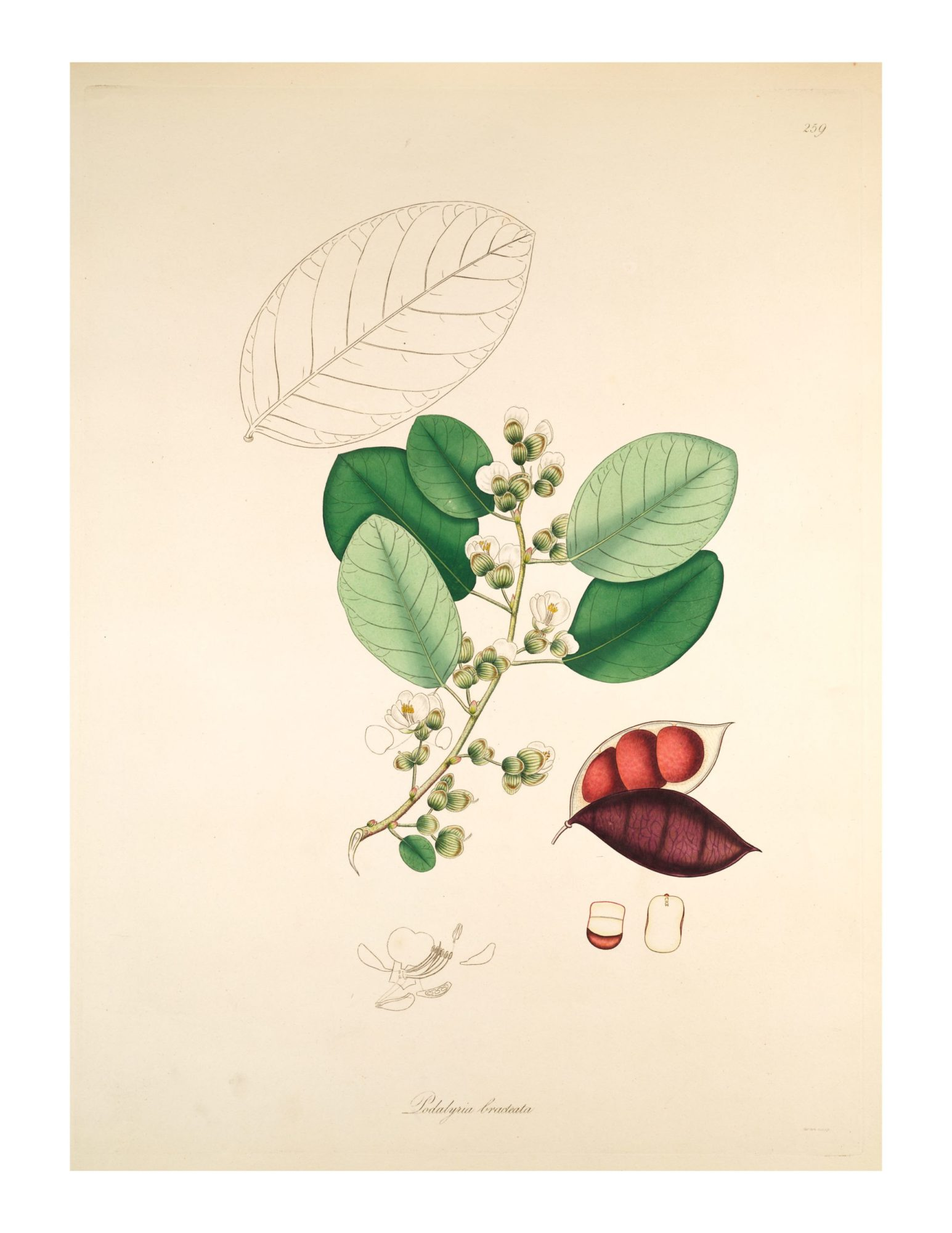
- Dalhousiea bracteata

Scientific classification
- Kingdom: Plantae
- Clade: Tracheophytes
- Clade: Angiosperms
- Clade: Eudicots
- Clade: Rosids
- Order: Fabales
- Family: Fabaceae
- Subfamily: Faboideae
- Tribe: Baphieae
- Genus: Dalhousiea; Graham ex Benth. (1837)

Species
- Dalhousiea africana S.Moore; Dalhousiea bracteata (Roxb.) Graham ex Benth.

= Dalhousiea =

Genus of legumes

Dalhousiea is a genus of flowering plants in the legume family, Fabaceae. It belongs to the subfamily Faboideae. It includes two species, one native to central Africa, and the other to eastern India, Bangladesh, and Myanmar.

The genus was named by Robert Graham after James Andrew Ramsey the 10th Earl of Dalhousie or alternatively after George Ramsay, 9th Earl of Dalhousie and Christian Ramsay, Countess of Dalhousie, for her work in the classification of Indian botany. Dalhousiea was traditionally assigned to the tribe Sophoreae; however, recent molecular phylogenetic analyses reassigned Dalhousiea into the Baphieae tribe.

== Species ==
Dalhousiea includes two accepted species:

- Dalhousiea africana S.Moore
- Dalhousiea bracteata (Roxb.) Graham ex Benth.
