= Authors of Plant Names =

Book published in 1992

Authors of Plant Names (Brummitt & Powell) by Richard Kenneth Brummitt and C. Emma Powell, 1992, is a print database of accepted standardized abbreviations used for citing the author who validly published the name of a taxon. The database is now maintained online at the International Plant Names Index. The book provides recommended abbreviations for authors' names that help to distinguish authors with the same surname when giving the full name of a taxon. It deals authors who validly published the name of a flowering plant, gymnosperm, fern, bryophyte, algae, fungi or fossil plants. Prior to its publication in 1992, many abbreviations for authors to be cited could be found in Taxonomic literature. A selective guide to botanical publications and collections with dates, commentaries and types. by F. A. Stafleu & R. F. Cowen, 1976–1988.

The International Code of Nomenclature for algae, fungi, and plants (ICN) governs the naming of these organisms, and suggests that a taxon be fully identified by its name and the author, but does not require that abbreviations be used when citing an author for a taxon. When abbreviations are used, the ICN recommends that Brummitt & Powell's Authors of plant names (1992), and the websites, the International Plant Names Index and the Index Fungorum can be used to find "unambiguous" abbreviations. Brummitt & Powell may not be international in scope, and it may be missing abbreviations for authors who validly published taxa during some time spans. A full name, rather than an abbreviation, may also make it easier to locate the original publication for the taxon name.
