= Christian Ramsay =

Countess of Dalhousie (1786–1839), hostess and botanical collector

The Right Honourable The Countess of Dalhousie
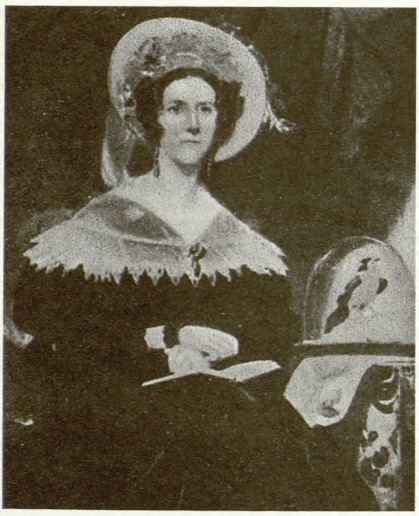
- A portrait of Christian Ramsay, beside a watercolour of a flower and a bird
- Born: Christian Broun; 28 February 1786; Coalstoun, East Lothian, Scotland
- Died: 22 January 1839 (aged 52); Edinburgh, Scotland
- Other name: Lady Dalhousie
- Spouse: George Ramsay, 9th Earl of Dalhousie
- Children: 3 sons, including James
- Scientific career
- Fields: Botany

Christian Ramsay, Countess of Dalhousie (née Broun; 28 February 1786 – 22 January 1839), informally Lady Dalhousie, was a Scottish botanist and natural historian. She married George Ramsay, 9th Earl of Dalhousie and travelled with him when he was appointed Lieutenant Governor of Nova Scotia, Governor General of Canada and Commander in Chief of the Indian Army. While travelling, she collected and catalogued many species of plants, presented scientific papers to societies and donated many collections to different botanical groups.

Lady Dalhousie was made an honorary member of the Botanical Society of Edinburgh and was its only female honorary member until her death. A genus of tropical plant, Dalhousiea, is named after her.

== Family ==
Dalhousie was born Christian Broun on 28 February 1786 at Coalstoun, the ancestral home of the Broun family near Haddington, East Lothian. She was the only child of Christian McDowal and Charles Broun. The Broun family had a history in the legal profession; her father was an advocate and his father a judge, George Broun, Lord Coalstoun. On 14 May 1805, she married George Ramsay, the 9th Earl of Dalhousie and was styled Countess of Dalhousie.

Dalhousie and her husband had three sons. Their eldest, George, was born 3 August 1806, a captain in the 26th (Cameronian) Regiment of Foot, he died on 25 October 1832. Their second son, Charles, died at nine years old. Their youngest, James, born 22 April 1812, inherited his father's title in 1838 and was created Marquess of Dalhousie in 1849.

== Scientific work ==
"Lady Dalhousie was eminently distinguished for a fund of the most varied knowledge, for a clear and powerful judgement, for acute observation, a kind heart, a brilliant wit."

— Dean Ramsay

Dalhousie was a keen botanist; she catalogued plants on herbarium sheets, fully identified and complete with collection dates, notes on habitats and some with watercolour pictures she had painted. In 1824, Lord Dalhousie co-founded the Literary and Historical Society of Quebec. Lady Dalhousie's catalogue of Canadian plants was included in the first issue of the society's Transactions in 1829. Dalhousie presented a paper to the Society, and donated her collection of Nova Scotian specimens as part of a herbarium in 1824.

Lady Dalhousie donated her entire East Indian Herbarium to the Botanical Society of Edinburgh. The society noted its quality and made Lady Dalhousie an honorary member in 1837; at the time of her death she was the only female honorary member. Records of correspondence with Kew botanist, Sir William Hooker, include large collections of plants from Simla and Penang in 1831. Her collections were included when Joseph Dalton Hooker compiled his Flora Indica.

== Travels ==
When her husband was appointed Lieutenant Governor of Nova Scotia, she travelled with him and their three sons to Canada on the frigate HMS Forth. The family lived in Halifax, Nova Scotia for four years from 1816 to 1820. Whilst there, Lady Dalhousie spent her time in the promotion of science. She toured the countryside with her husband, recommended improvements to farming and collected botanical items. She sent seeds to Dalhousie Castle for the gardens. William Hooker relied on her for botanical samples, and called her a "very zealous botanist".

In 1820, the family moved to Quebec, when her husband was appointed Governor General of British North America. Dalhousie took on the traditional role of a governor's wife, that of "Patron of literature and the arts". She spent much time in high society and was known for her wit and satirical caricatures of society members. Once established, Dalhousie and her friends, Anne Mary Perceval and Harriet Sheppard, started focusing on natural history and in particular cataloguing local botany. All three women corresponded with and collected for Sir William Hooker who credited their efforts in his book Flora Boreali-Americana.

In 1824, the family returned to Dalhousie Castle and began plans for an extensive garden. Their gardener, Joseph Archibald, wrote of her that "few ... attained such proficiency as her ladyship in the science". Plans for the garden were cut short as the family suffered severe financial losses when their agent went bankrupt. Although the garden was not completed, many of the North American plants had been planted and flowered for the first time in Great Britain. The family moved to a modest farmhouse in Sorel in 1826 and remained there until Lord Dalhousie was appointed Governor General and Commander-in-Chief of India in 1829.

On the journey to India, the family stopped at Madeira, St. Helena and the Cape of Good Hope. At each place, Dalhousie took time to collect plants and made a detailed catalogue of them. In 1831 she visited the foothills of Simla, along with Penang, near the Malay Peninsula.

== Death and legacy ==
Dalhousie died suddenly on 22 January 1839 in the home of Dean Ramsay aged 52. One report mentions that she was so dedicated to her studies that she died with a list of plants in her hand. The collection that she and her husband had made was sold in 1985; parts went to the Nova Scotia Museum, the National Gallery of Canada, the Library and Archives Canada and the Provincial Archives of New Brunswick. Three hundred plant specimens collected by the Dalhousie at Sorel between 1826 and 1828 are maintained in the herbarium (HAM) at Royal Botanical Gardens (Ontario).

For her work in the classification of Indian botany, Robert Graham named a genus of Fabaceae, a flowering plant native to India, after her – Dalhousiea. One of the plants she sent to Graham was a new discovery, so he named the plant Asplenium dalhousiae after her. Sir William Hooker dedicated a volume of Curtis's Botanical Magazine to her. Julia Catherine Beckwith, who is credited as Canada's first writer of fiction, dedicated her first novel to her. Dalhousie was the first owner of one of the "Philadelphia" copies of Jane Austen's Emma. Rhododendron dalhousieae Hook. f. was named for her by Joseph Dalton Hooker.
