= Pentaphragma bartlettii =

Scientific classification
- Kingdom: Plantae
- Clade: Tracheophytes
- Clade: Angiosperms
- Clade: Eudicots
- Clade: Asterids
- Order: Asterales
- Family: Pentaphragmataceae
- Genus: Pentaphragma
- Species: P. bartlettii

Binomial name
- Pentaphragma bartlettii Merr.

Species of flowering plant

Pentaphragma bartlettii is a species of flowering plant in the family Pentaphragmataceae. It is a perennial native to Sumatra, and was described in 1934.

== Taxonomy ==
The species was described by Elmer Drew Merrill in 1934.

== Distribution ==
Pentaphragma bartlettii is native to the wet tropical biome of Sumatra.

== Description ==
Pentaphragma bartlettii is a perennial.
