= Bowringia =

Scientific classification
- Kingdom: Plantae
- Clade: Tracheophytes
- Clade: Angiosperms
- Clade: Eudicots
- Clade: Rosids
- Order: Fabales
- Family: Fabaceae
- Subfamily: Faboideae
- Tribe: Baphieae
- Genus: Bowringia; Champ. ex Benth. (1852)

Species
- Four; see text

Genus of legumes

Bowringia is a genus of flowering plants in the legume family (Fabaceae), found in tropical Africa and southeastern Asia. It includes four species native to western and central Africa and Madagascar, and to Borneo, Indochina, and southern China.

Bowringia belongs to subfamily Faboideae. The genus was traditionally assigned to the tribe Sophoreae; however, recent molecular phylogenetic analyses reassigned Bowringia to the Baphieae tribe. It was named after Sir John Bowring and his son, J. C. Bowring for their botanical work in China.

== Species ==
Bowringia comprises the following species:

- Bowringia callicarpa Champ. ex Benth. southeastern China, Hainan, Vietnam, Laos, Cambodia, and Borneo
- Bowringia discolor J.Hall – Liberia to Ghana
- Bowringia libirica (Breteler) M.Yu.Gontsch. & Povydysh – Liberia
- Bowringia mildbraedii Harms – Ghana to Central African Republic and Angola, and eastern Madagascar.
