= Pterocarpin =

Names
- Other names (−)-Pterocarpin; 3-Methoxy-8,9-methylenedioxypterocarpan

Identifiers
CAS Number	524-97-0
3D model (JSmol)	Interactive image
ChemSpider	1363798
PubChem CID	1715306
UNII	NZ7T2XO0S1
- InChI: InChI=1S/C17H14O5/c1-18-9-2-3-10-13(4-9)19-7-12-11-5-15-16(21-8-20-15)6-14(11)22-17(10)12/h2-6,12,17H,7-8H2,1H3/t12-,17-/m0/s1 Key: YLZYAUCOYZKLMA-SJCJKPOMSA-N
- SMILES: O(C)C=1C=C2C([C@]3([C@](C=4C(O3)=CC5=C(C4)OCO5)(CO2)[H])[H])=CC1

Properties
Chemical formula	C_{17}H_{14}O_{5}
Molar mass	298.294 g·mol^{−1}
- Except where otherwise noted, data are given for materials in their standard state (at 25 °C [77 °F], 100 kPa). Infobox references

Pterocarpin is a pterocarpan found in the Fabaceae species Baphia nitida, Ononis viscosa subsp. breviflora, Pterocarpus spp., Sophora angustifolia, Sophora substrata and Swartzia madagascariensis.
