= Baphiastrum =

Scientific classification
- Kingdom: Plantae
- Clade: Tracheophytes
- Clade: Angiosperms
- Clade: Eudicots
- Clade: Rosids
- Order: Fabales
- Family: Fabaceae
- Subfamily: Faboideae
- Tribe: Baphieae
- Genus: Baphiastrum; Harms (1913)
- Species: B. brachycarpum

Binomial name
- Baphiastrum brachycarpum Harms (1913)

Synonyms
- Baphia boonei De Wild. (1915); Baphiastrum boonei (De Wild.) Vermoesen ex De Wild. (1925); Leucomphalos brachycarpus (Harms) Breteler (1994)

Genus of legumes

Baphiastrum is a genus of flowering plants in the legume family (Fabaceae). It includes a single species, Baphiastrum brachycarpum, a liana native to west-central Africa. It grows in Guineo-Congolian forest in Cameroon, Gabon, Republic of the Congo, Central African Republic, and Democratic Republic of the Congo.

It belongs to the subfamily Faboideae. Baphiastrum was traditionally assigned to the tribe Sophoreae; however, recent molecular phylogenetic analyses reassigned Baphiastrum to the Baphieae tribe.
