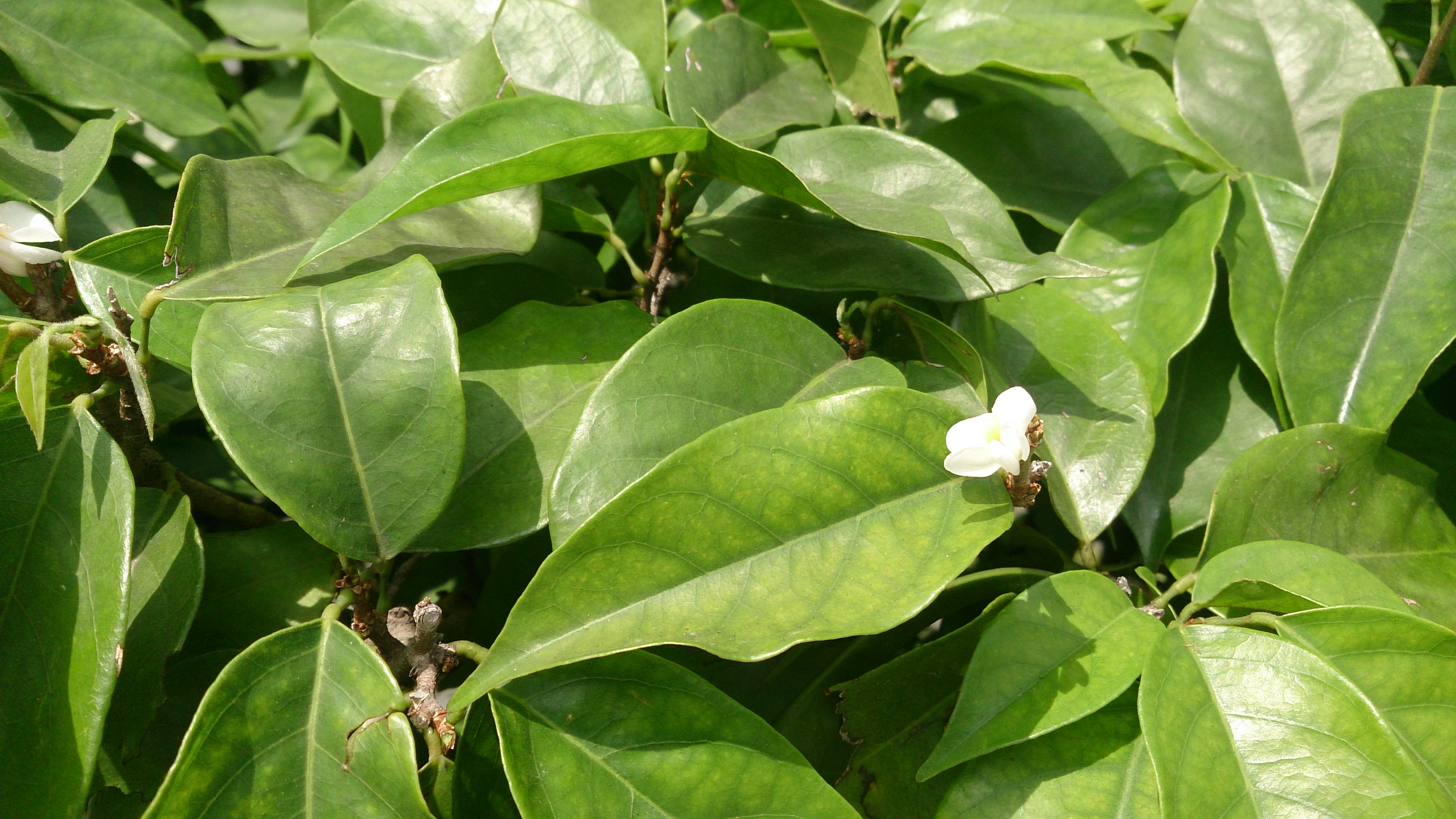

Conservation status
- Least Concern (IUCN 3.1)

Scientific classification
- Kingdom: Plantae
- Clade: Tracheophytes
- Clade: Angiosperms
- Clade: Eudicots
- Clade: Rosids
- Order: Fabales
- Family: Fabaceae
- Subfamily: Faboideae
- Genus: Baphia
- Species: B. nitida

Binomial name
- Baphia nitida Lodd.
- The distribution of Baphia nitida.

Synonyms
- Baphia angolensis sensu Lester-Garland; Baphia barombiensis Taub.; Baphia haematoxylon (Schum. & Thonn.) Hooker f.; Carpolobia versicolor G. Don; Delaria pyrifolia Desv.; Podalyria haematoxylon Schum. & Thonn.

= Baphia nitida =

Species of legume

Baphia nitida, also known as camwood, barwood, and African sandalwood (although not a true sandalwood), is a shrubby, leguminous, hard-wooded tree from central west Africa. It is a small understorey, evergreen tree, often planted in villages, and known as osun in Yoruba.

The wood is of a very fine colour, and is used in woodturning for making knife handles and similar articles. The tree's bark and heartwood are commonly used to make a brilliant but non-permanent red dye, which is soluble in alkali.

Pterocarpin is a pterocarpan found in B. nitida.

Osun (camwood) extract is also used in some soaps and skin treatments, primarily among the Yoruba people of West Africa. The extract of the Camwood can be formed into a soft soap like material that is thought to promote healthy skin.
