= Gonystylus nobilis =

Conservation status
- Endangered (IUCN 3.1)

Scientific classification
- Kingdom: Plantae
- Clade: Tracheophytes
- Clade: Angiosperms
- Clade: Eudicots
- Clade: Rosids
- Order: Malvales
- Family: Thymelaeaceae
- Genus: Gonystylus
- Species: G. nobilis

Binomial name
- Gonystylus nobilis Airy Shaw

Species of ramin tree from Borneo

Gonystylus nobilis is a species of plant in the family Thymelaeaceae. It is a tree endemic to Borneo where it is confined to Sarawak. The species has been assessed as Endangered on the IUCN Red List due to conversion of its forest habitat to palm oil plantations.
