= Pentaphragma longisepalum =

Scientific classification
- Kingdom: Plantae
- Clade: Tracheophytes
- Clade: Angiosperms
- Clade: Eudicots
- Clade: Asterids
- Order: Asterales
- Family: Pentaphragmataceae
- Genus: Pentaphragma
- Species: P. longisepalum

Binomial name
- Pentaphragma longisepalum Kiew

Species of flowering plant

Pentaphragma longisepalum is a species of flowering plant in the family Pentaphragmataceae. It has elliptical leaves, capitate inflorescences, and whitish flowers. The species is native to Borneo, and was described in 1990.

== Taxonomy ==
The species was described by Ruth Kiew in 1990. It was previously confused with Pentaphragma cyrtandriforme.

== Distribution ==
Pentaphragma longisepalum is native to the wet tropical biome of Sabah and Sarawak, Borneo. The species is found in montane forests, at elevations of 830–2,170 metres (2,720–7,120 ft).

It grows in shady areas on ridges and wet cliffs, and near streams.

== Description ==
Pentaphragma longisepalum grows 4–100 centimetres (1.6–39.4 in) high, and flowers when around 4 centimetres (1.6 in) high. The stem is 4–7 millimetres (0.16–0.28 in) thick, and woody at the base.

The leaves are elliptical, 7.5–18.5 centimetres (3.0–7.3 in) long, 4–9 centimetres (1.6–3.5 in) wide, and papery when dry. The leaf stems are 2–9 centimetres (0.79–3.54 in) long.

The inflorescence is capitate, and has three to ten flowers, which are arranged in two rows. The inflorescence stem is 7–12 millimetres (0.28–0.47 in) long. The flowers are 13–25 millimetres (0.51–0.98 in) long, 6–9 millimetres (0.24–0.35 in) wide, have five parts, and lack stems. The calyx has whitish, membranous, lanceolate lobes. The corolla is gamopetalous, and has a short, fleshy tube, which is around 2 millimetres (0.079 in) long. The corolla lobes are white to whitish-green, and turn cream to yellow. The lobes are membranous, around 4 millimetres (0.16 in) long, and around 2 millimetres (0.079 in) wide. The hypanthium is ellipsoid, 7–10 millimetres (0.28–0.39 in) long, 3–4 millimetres (0.12–0.16 in) wide, and enlarges when the plant is in fruit.
