= Richard Kenneth Brummitt =

English botanist (1937–2013)

Richard Kenneth "Dick" Brummitt (22 May 1937 – 18 September 2013) was a British botanist. He co-created Authors of Plant Names.

== Early life ==
He was born in Liverpool in1937 where he went to university and did his Ph.D. on Calystegia.

== Career ==
In 1963 he was employed by the Ministry of Overseas Development working in the African Section at the Herbarium of the Royal Botanic Gardens, Kew. He joined the staff of Kew in 1968 working on Leguminosae for Flora Zambesiaca.

He was known for his expertise on Botanical Nomenclature and was awarded the Kew Medal in 1991 for his contributions to nomenclature. From 1975 he was secretary of the Committee for Spermatophyta, which became the Nomenclature Committee for Vascular Plants, until 2011.

He was one of the founders in the 1980s of Biodiversity Information Standards (TDWG), and was author of Vascular plant families and genera (1992) and Authors of Plant Names (1992). He worked on the Index to European Taxonomic Literature which became the Kew Record of Taxonomic Literature (1971–2007).

He was also a plant collector in southern Europe, Russia, East Africa, and Australia.

He contributed to the debate on paraphyly versus Hennigian classification. A series of papers on Paraphyly was dedicated to Dick Brummitt in 2014.

Brummitt retired in 1997 but continued to work in the Herbarium.

== Eponymy ==
Calystegia brummittii P.P.A.Ferreira & Sim.-Bianch. and Alchemilla brummittii K.M.Purohit & Panigrahi are named for him.

== Personal life ==
Brummitt was married to Hilary Jane Crawford (1945–1988) in 1968 and had three children, Patrick, Neil and Lindsay.

== Selected publications ==
- Brummitt, R. K. Index to European taxonomic literature. 1966, 1968, 1969 (from 1968 with Ian Keith Ferguson; published in Regnum Vegetabile).
- Brummitt, R.K. 1992. Vascular plant families and genera. Royal Botanic Garden, Kew
- Brummitt, R.K. & Powell, C.E, 1992. R. K. Authors of plant names. A list of authors of scientific names of plants, with recommended standard forms of their names, including abbreviations. Royal Botanic Gardens, Kew 1992
- Hollis, S. & Brummitt, R. K., World Geographical Scheme for Recording Plant Distributions. Plant Taxonomic Database Standards No. 2. Version 1.0. 1992 Published for the International Working Group on Taxonomic Databases for Plant Sciences (TDWG) by the Hunt Institute for Botanical Documentation, Carnegie Mellon University, Pittsburgh
- Brummitt, R.K. 1997. Taxonomy versus cladonomy, a fundamental controversy in biological systematics. Taxon 46 723–734 doi:10.2307/1224478
- Brummitt, R. K. with assistance from F. Pando, S. Hollis, N. A. Brummitt and others. 2001. Plant Taxonomic Database Standards No. 2.ed. 2. World Geographical Scheme for Recording Plant Distributions, ed. 2.
- Brummitt, R. K. World Geographical Scheme for Recording Plant Distributions. TDWG, 2001
- Brummitt, Richard K. 2003. How to chop up a tree. Taxon 51 31–41.doi:10.2307/1554961
- Brummitt, Richard K. 2003. Further dogged defense of paraphyletic taxa. Taxon 52 803–804 doi:10.2307/3647353
