= Herbert Kenneth Airy Shaw =

English botanist and classicist (1902-1985)

- Born: 7 April 1902; Woodbridge, Suffolk, UK
- Died: 19 August 1985 (aged 83)
- Education: Corpus Christi College, Cambridge
- Scientific career
- Workplaces: Kew Gardens

Herbert Kenneth Airy Shaw (7 April 1902 – 19 August 1985) was a notable English botanist and classicist. He worked at Kew Gardens, as was an expert on tropical Asian botany and on entomology. The genus Airyantha is named for him.

== Life ==
Airy Shaw was born at The Mount, Grange Road, Woodbridge, Suffolk to a father serving as Second Master at the Woodbridge Grammar School and a mother descended from George Biddell Airy, Astronomer Royal (1835–1881). His younger sister was the illustrator Margaret Olive Milne-Redhead (also known as Olive Shaw). In 1921 he entered Corpus Christi College, Cambridge University, to read classics, but he switched to natural sciences, taking his degree in 1924 and finishing in 1925, having been a student of Humphrey Gilbert-Carter. He was an active member of the Cambridge Inter-Collegiate Christian Union.

== Research ==
Airy Shaw took a position at Kew Gardens after graduation, beginning as an unpaid volunteer in 1925. Initially he worked with William Dallimore and John Holland in the museum, and then moved to the Herbarium, where he worked with William Turrill and Cecil Marquand. During the war he was evacuated to Gloucester with the Kew collections, and there became interested in Euphorbiaceae. He resigned from Kew in 1952, by which time he had become Principal Scientific Officer and Kew's chief expert on nomenclature, with responsibility for the Index Kewensis. Returning to Kew in 1958, he continued working in the herbarium until his death in 1985, aged eighty three.

Airy Shaw became an expert on tropical Asian botany and on entomology. The genus Airyantha is named for him.

== Selected works ==
- The Euphorbiaceae of Borneo, Her Majesty's Stationery Office, 1975. ISBN 978-0-11-241099-7.
- The Euphorbiaceae of New Guinea, Her Majesty's Stationery Office, 1980. ISBN 978-0-11-241146-8.
- A Dictionary of the Flowering Plants and Ferns, 8th Edition. Cambridge University Press, 1973.
