= Thymelaea procumbens =

Scientific classification
- Kingdom: Plantae
- Clade: Tracheophytes
- Clade: Angiosperms
- Clade: Eudicots
- Clade: Rosids
- Order: Malvales
- Family: Thymelaeaceae
- Genus: Thymelaea
- Species: T. procumbens

Binomial name
- Thymelaea procumbens A.Fern. & R.Fern.

Species of plant

Thymelaea procumbens is a species of flowering plant in the family Thymelaeaceae. It is native to Portugal and Spain.
