= Tricliceras elatum =

Conservation status
- Endangered (IUCN 3.1)

Scientific classification
- Kingdom: Plantae
- Clade: Tracheophytes
- Clade: Angiosperms
- Clade: Eudicots
- Clade: Rosids
- Order: Malpighiales
- Family: Passifloraceae
- Genus: Tricliceras
- Species: T. elatum

Binomial name
- Tricliceras elatum (A.Fern. & R.Fern.) R.Fern.

Species of flowering plant

Tricliceras elatum is a distylous herb native to northern Mozambique, Africa. As of 2020, T. elatum has been classified as endangered.
