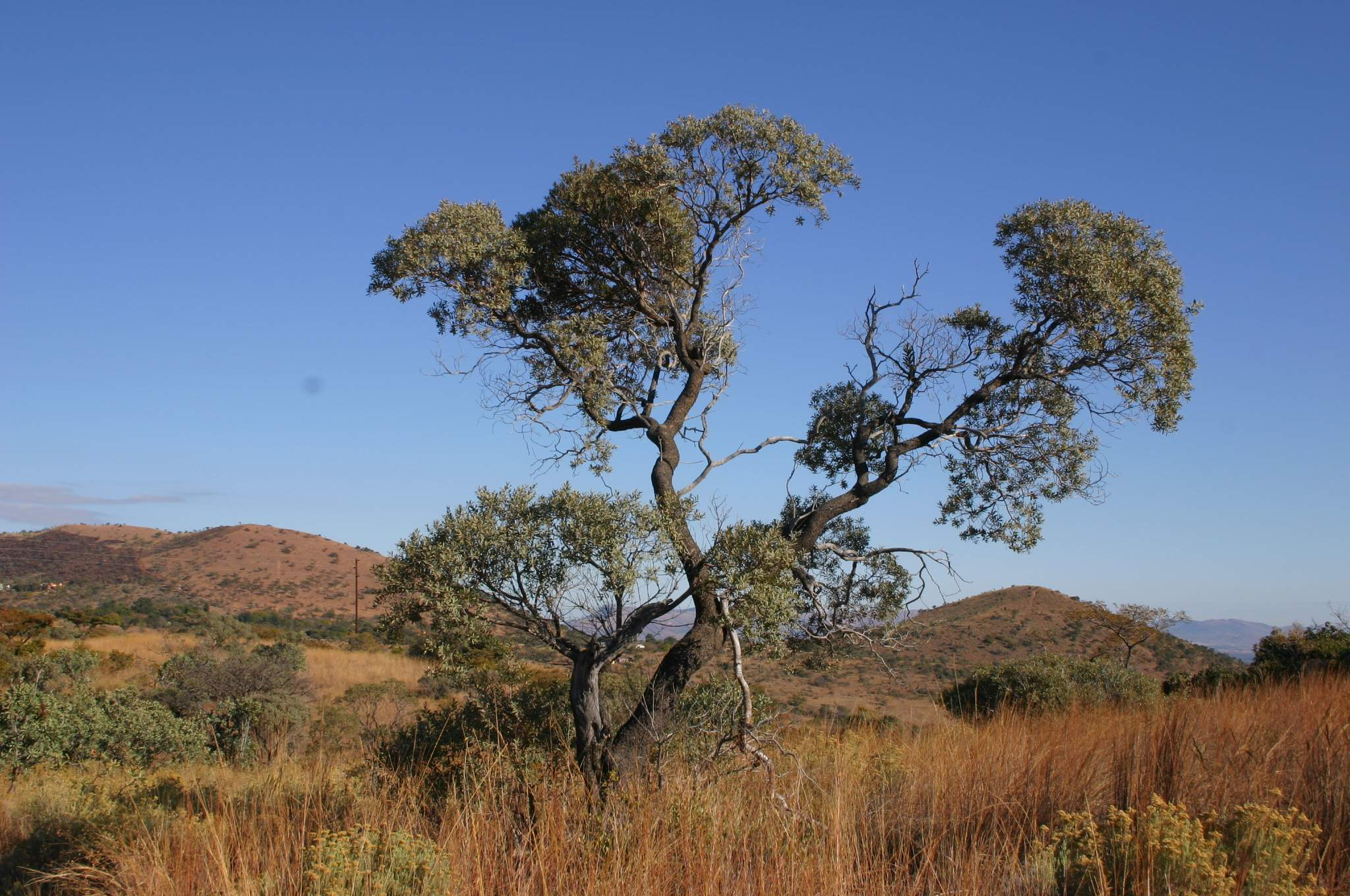
- Habit in the Magaliesberg, North West

Conservation status
- Least Concern (IUCN 3.1)

Scientific classification
- Kingdom: Plantae
- Clade: Tracheophytes
- Clade: Angiosperms
- Clade: Eudicots
- Clade: Rosids
- Order: Sapindales
- Family: Anacardiaceae
- Genus: Ozoroa
- Species: O. paniculosa

Binomial name
- Ozoroa paniculosa (Sond.) R.Fern. & A.Fern.

Synonyms
- Rhus paniculosa Sond.; Anaphrenium paniculosum (Sond.) Engl.; Heeria paniculosa (Sond.) Kuntze

= Ozoroa paniculosa =

Species of tree

Ozoroa paniculosa (previously Heeria paniculosa), commonly known as the bushveld ozoroa or common resin tree, is a small tree belonging to the mango family or Anacardiaceae. It is native to southern Africa, where it occurs in Zimbabwe, South Africa, Mozambique, Botswana and Namibia. It grows to a height of about 6 metres at high elevations, but may reach 15 metres in warmer, low-lying areas. This genus currently has some 28 species and occurs from southern Africa to the Arabian Peninsula.

This deciduous dioecious tree's silvery-green alternate or whorled, simple, discolorous leaves show distinctive parallel secondary venation, and are silky-tomentose on the under-surface. Drooping creamy-white panicles of fragrant flowers are produced at the ends of new shoots. The fruits which are initially light-green in colour and borne on salmon-pink peduncles, become speckled with reddish-brown and later turn completely black and wrinkled. Broken shoots may exude a milky latex. Bark is granular and dark grey to black. The species is prone to fire damage and then becomes vulnerable to insects such as borers, while the developing seeds are parasitised by insects.

== Gallery ==
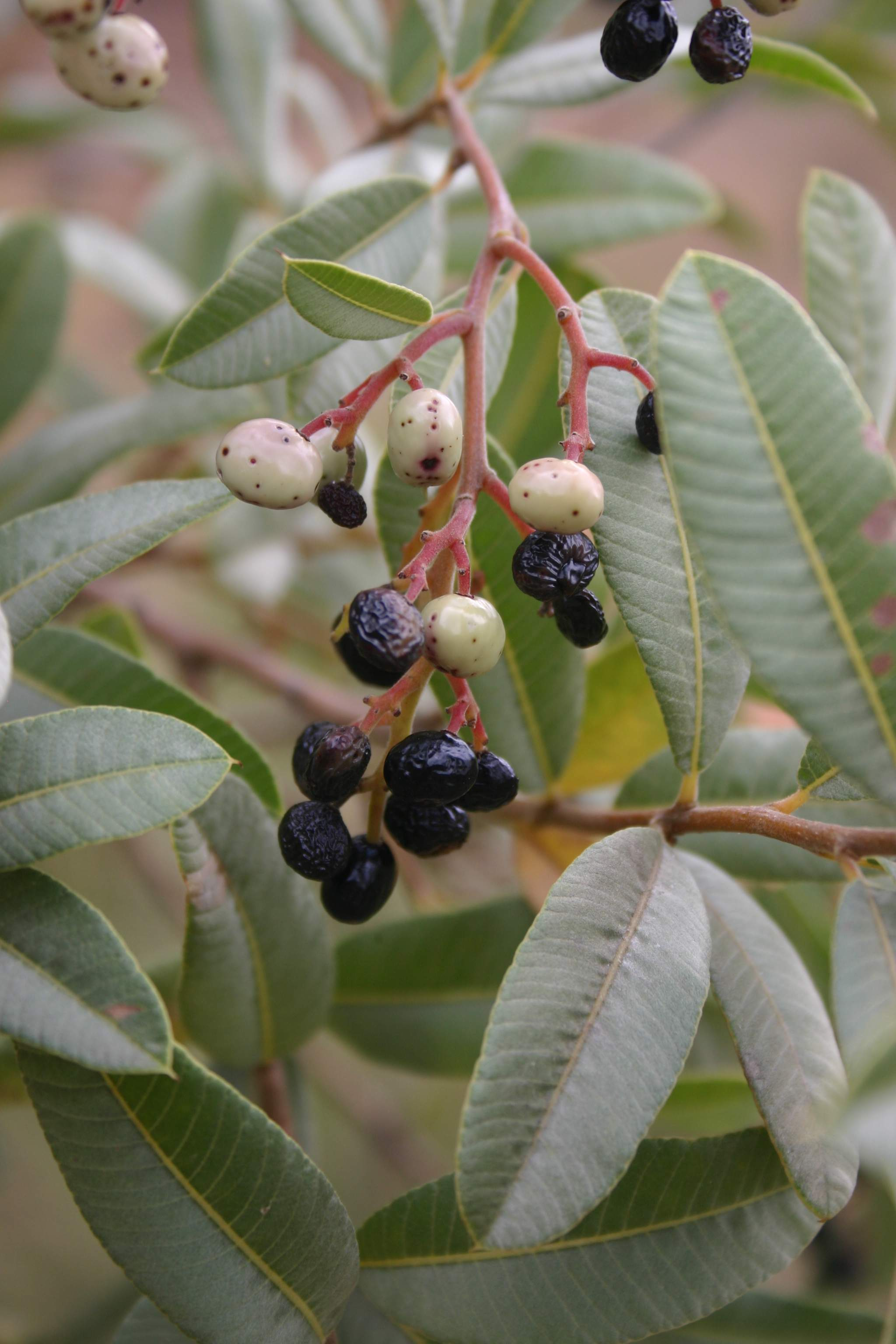
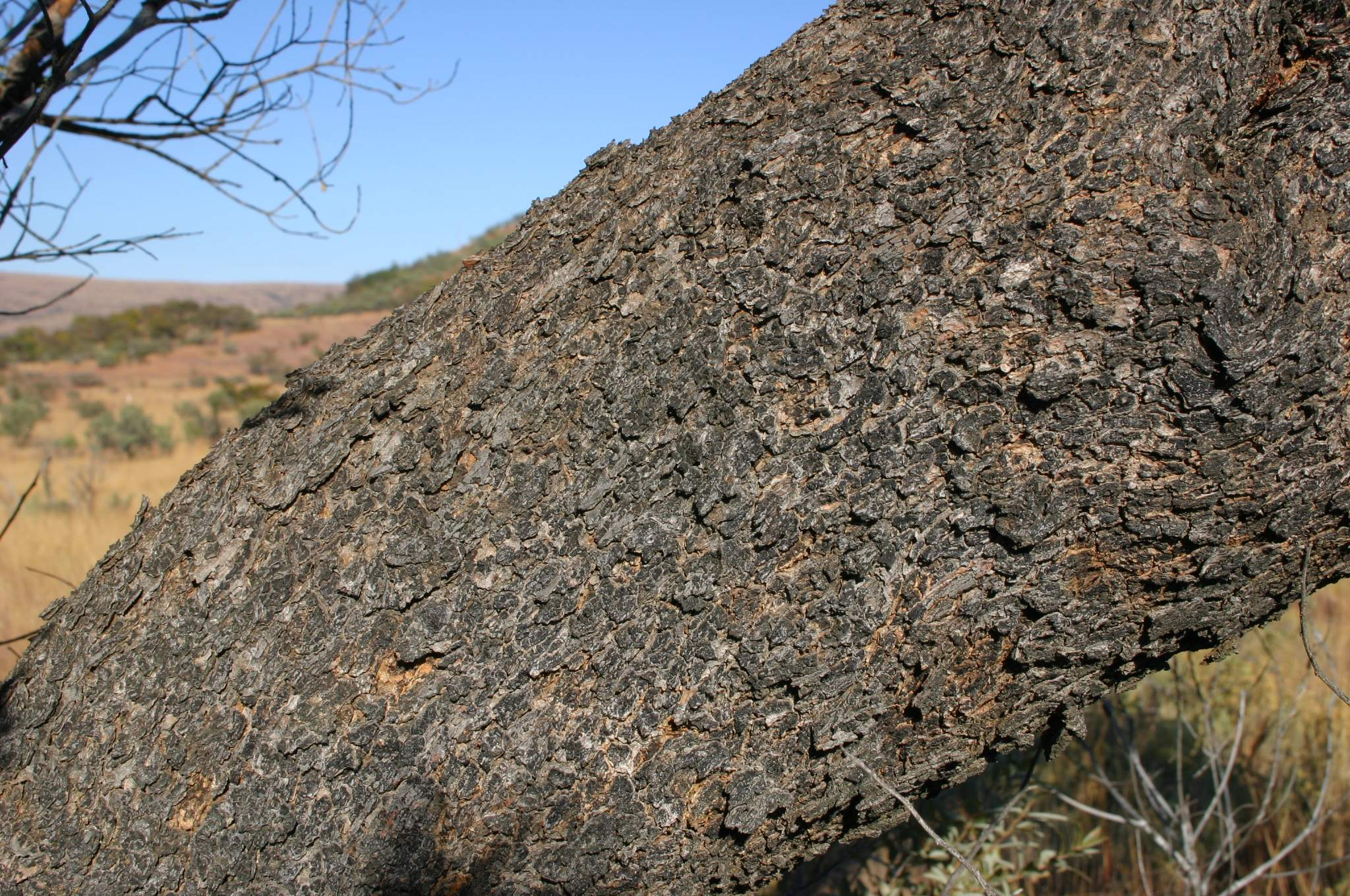
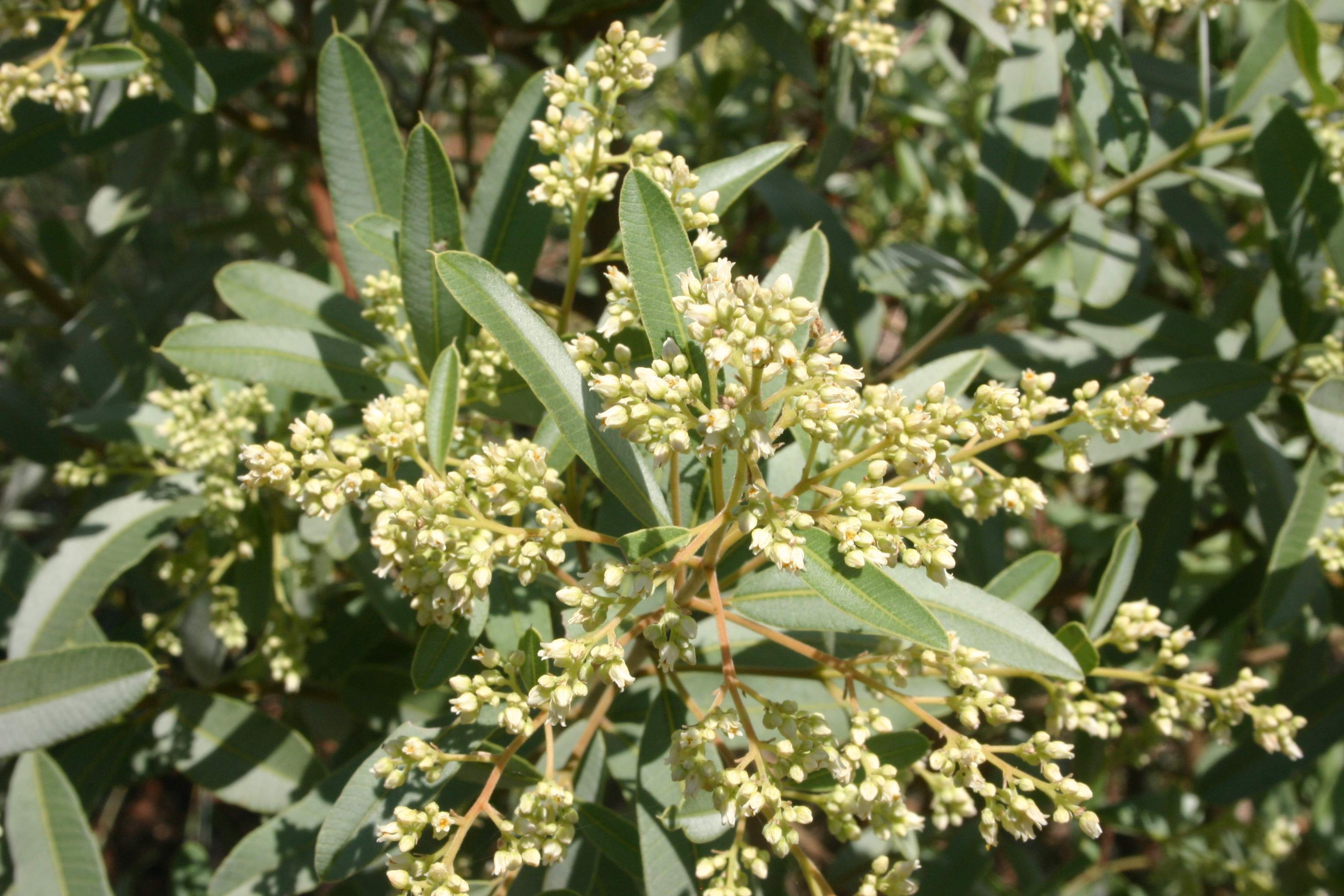
