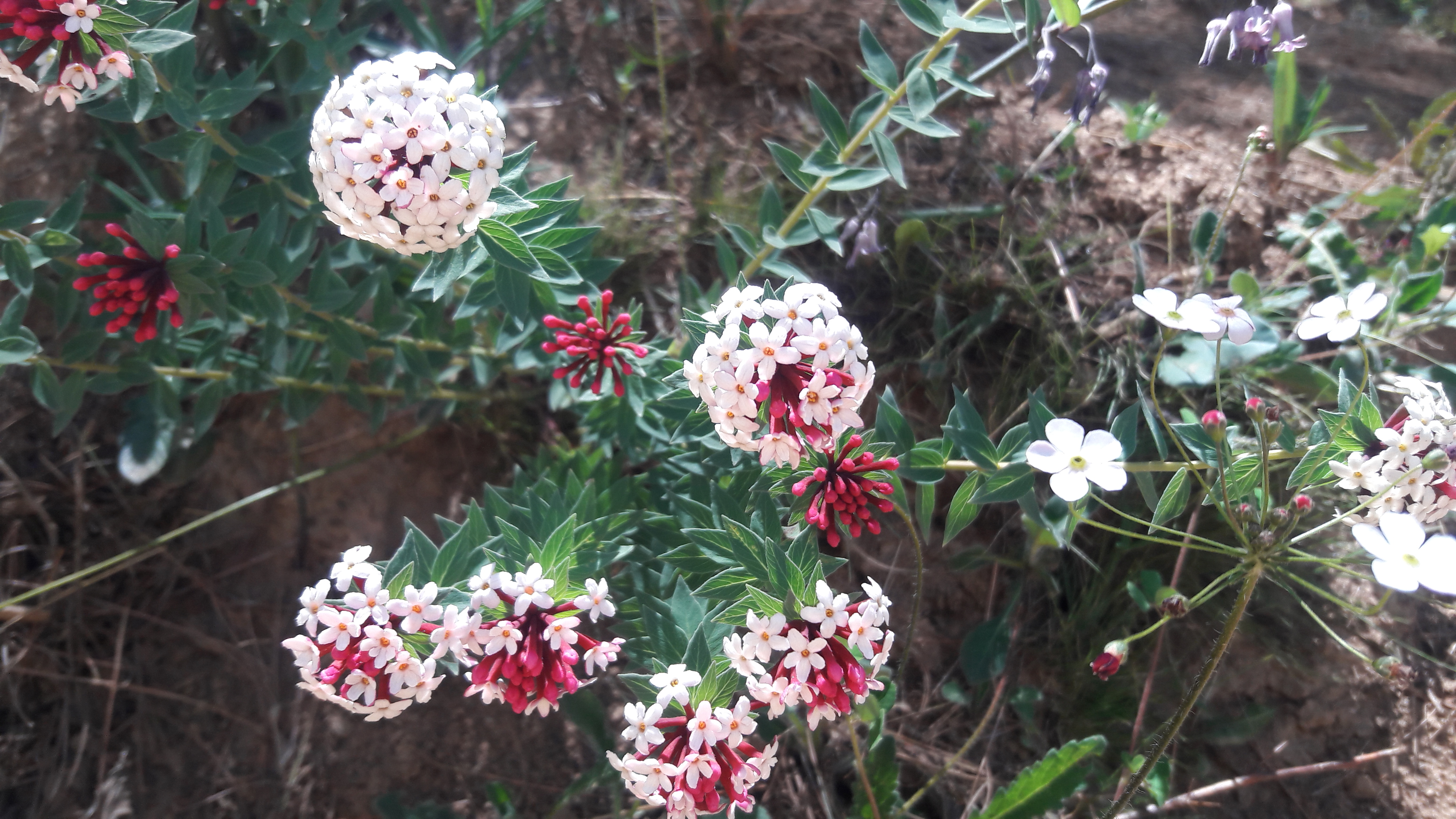

Scientific classification
- Kingdom: Plantae
- Clade: Tracheophytes
- Clade: Angiosperms
- Clade: Eudicots
- Clade: Rosids
- Order: Malvales
- Family: Thymelaeaceae
- Subfamily: Thymelaeoideae
- Genus: Stellera; L.
- Species: S. chamaejasme

Binomial name
- Stellera chamaejasme L.

Synonyms
- Synonyms list: Chamaejasme Kuntze (1891); Xaiasme Raf. (1838); Chamaejasme stelleriana Kuntze (1891); Daphne meisneriana Halda (1999); Passerina chamaejasme Fisch. ex Meisn. (1857); Passerina dichotoma Steud. (1841), not validly publ.; Passerina stelleri Wikstr. (1818); Stellera bodinieri H.Lév. (1912); Stellera chamaejasme f. angustifolia Diels (1912), opus utique oppr.; Stellera chamaejasme subsp. angustifolia (Diels) Kit Tan (1982); Stellera chamaejasme f. chrysantha S.C.Huang (1985); Stellera concinna Edgew. (1846); Stellera dichotoma Fisch. ex Sweet (1839), not validly publ.; Stellera himalayensis Gand. (1913); Stellera hypericifolia Endl. (1848); Stellera rosea Nakai (1920); Wikstroemia canescens Maxim. (1886), nom. illeg.; Wikstroemia chamaejasme (L.) Domke (1932); Wikstroemia chinensis Meisn. (1857); Wikstroemia hypericifolia Meisn. (1841); Wikstroemia rosea (Nakai) Domke (1932); Wikstroemia salicifolia Decne. (1844); Xaiasme bicolor Raf. (1838)

= Stellera =

Genus of flowering plants

Stellera is a genus of flowering plant in the family Thymelaeaceae, with a single species Stellera chamaejasme found in mountainous regions of Central Asia, China, Korea, Siberia and South Asia. S. chamaejasme is a herbaceous perennial plant with heads of white, pink or yellow flowers, grown as an ornamental plant in rock gardens and alpine houses, but considered a weed playing a role in the desertification of grasslands in parts of its native range. Like many others of its family, it is a poisonous plant with medicinal and other useful properties.

== Common names ==
Two common names recorded for the plant in Mongolian are одои далан туруу (odoi dalan turuu) and чонын Чолбодос (choniin cholbodos) - incomplete translation: choniin "of the wolf" + cholbodos [=?, possibly "poison"]. A common name for the plant in Tibetan is rejag.

== Description ==
Stellera chamaejasme is a herbaceous perennial. Unbranched stems, 20–30 cm tall, emerge in a cluster from an underground rhizome. Narrow, overlapping leaves are borne along the stems. Individual leaves are narrow and pointed, up to 2 cm long. The flowers are grouped into rounded tightly packed terminal heads. Flowers lack petals, instead having petaloid sepals forming a tube up to 1.5 cm long with usually five (but possibly four or six) short lobes. The flower colour varies from shades of pink and white to yellow. There are twice as many stamens as calyx lobes, in two series. The ovary has a single chamber (locule). The fruit is a dry drupe, enclosed by the remains of the calyx.

== Taxonomy ==
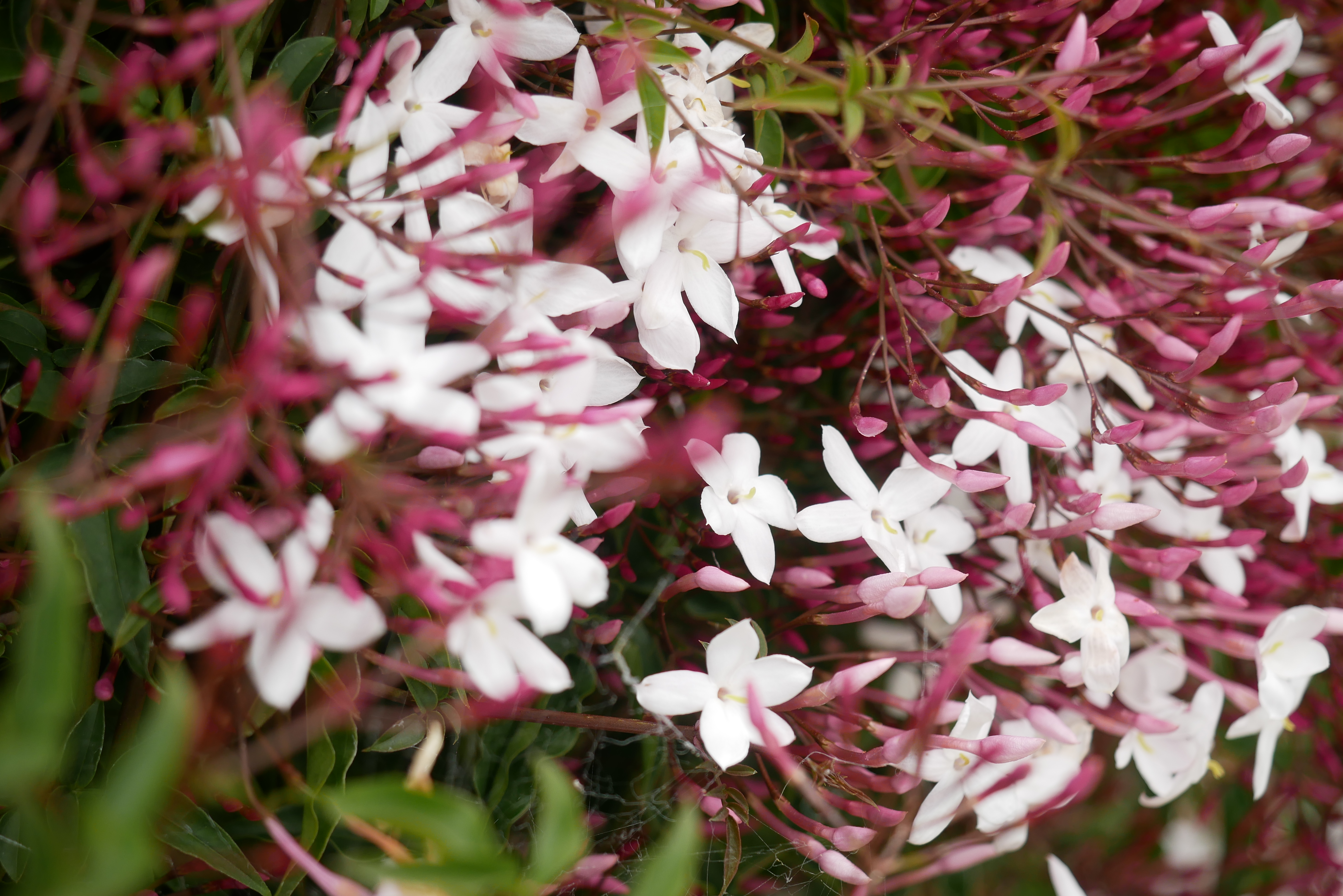
Jasminum polyanthum in bloom, showing wine-red exteriors of corollas reminiscent of those of Stellera (re. species name chamaejasme i.e. "ground jasmine").

The genus Stellera was first described by Carl Linnaeus in 1753. He recognized two species: Stellera passerina (now placed in the genus Thymelaea as T. passerina) and Stellera chamaejasme. The generic name Stellera (not to be confused with the entirely unrelated Stellaria) commemorates Georg Wilhelm Steller (Stöller), while the specific epithet chamaejasme is a rendering into botanical Latin orthography of the Greek χαμαί khamai "(down) on the ground" and ιασμε iasme "jasmine". The name in its entirety thus means "Steller's plant that resembles a kind of jasmine (that creeps) on the ground". The flower of Stellera chamaejasme is fragrant like that of jasmine and also has a wine-red exterior, like that of certain species of jasmine, e.g. common jasmine Jasminum officinale and the Chinese species Jasminum polyanthum. Unlike jasmine, however, Stellera is a herbaceous plant, not a woody one, and its stems do not twine.

Many species names were later created in the genus, but all are now usually considered synonyms of other species, including S. chamaejasme, although the Flora of China states that there are 10 to 12 species. Studies in 2002 and 2009, based on chloroplast DNA, placed Stellera in a small group of related genera, either as sister to Wikstroemia or embedded within it; however for most genera only one species was included.

- - Edgeworthia
  - - - Wikstroemia
      - Stellera
    - - Diarthron
      - - Thymelaea
        - Daphne

== Distribution and habitat ==
Stellera chamaejasme is native to northern and western Tibet, the Himalayas (Nepal, Bhutan), the state of Uttar Pradesh in north India, Russia and Mongolia. In China, it is found on sunny dry slopes and sandy places between 2600 and 4200 m.

== Cultivation ==
Stellera chamaejasme is cultivated as an ornamental plant in rock gardens and alpine houses. It is considered difficult to grow, needing a sunny position and gritty soil if grown outside, or a large pot if grown under cover. It is propagated by seed.

== Toxicity ==
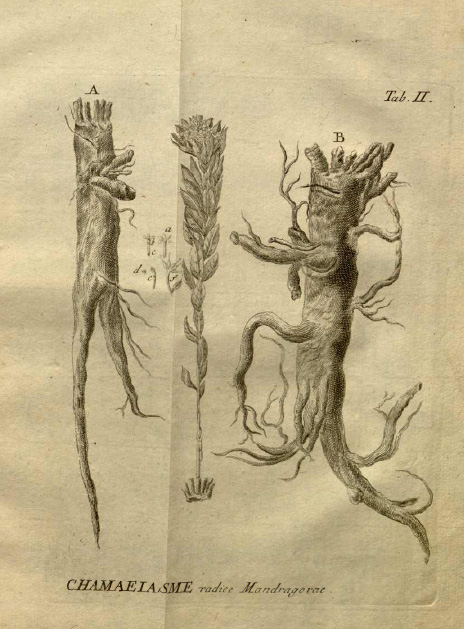
Compared and contrasted: roots of (fancied) human-like form of A: Stellera chamaejasme and B: Mandragora officinarum, the fabled Mandrake. Note also (centre) crown of Stellera, shown bearing a single, herbaceous flowering shoot.

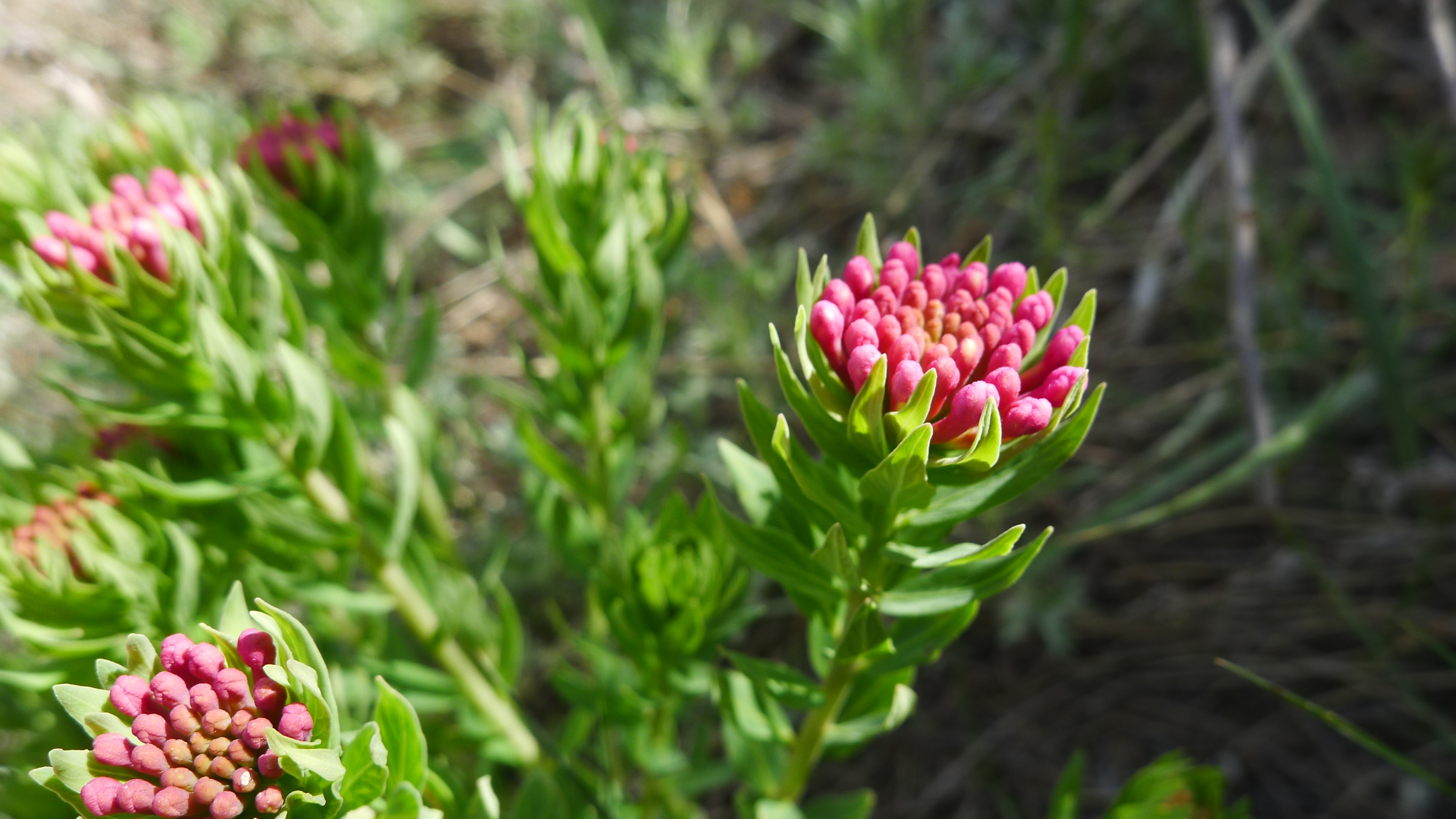
Stellera chamaejasme (in bud) growing in Gansu province, Western China, where it has the common name of Langdu (狼毒花) "wolf poison" - probably because it was formerly employed as such.

The Russians living in Dauria still hold Stellera in high esteem on account of its root, despite the fact that its violent effects have already dispatched a good many people to the afterlife. This root resembles a crudely-carved human figure to a degree even greater than that of the [famous] Alraune or Mandragora, such that one can often distinguish clearly in its natural form [protuberances resembling] a head, arms and legs; which has led to its being given the most apposite name of Muzhik koren [Мужик корен] or "Man root" by the Russians. The oldest rootstocks of this plant can reach the size of a large carrot, and [if taken as medicine] produce the most violent effects. Such old roots can produce more than fifty - and sometimes as many as a hundred - flowering shoots, which, crowned with their beautiful and fragrant flowers, give not the least hint of the violent and pernicious effects residing in the root that bore them. The exterior of the flower is usually of a dark reddish-purple, or, more rarely sulphur-yellow colour; while the interior is white. Add to this the fact that the flowers display, upon opening, a white border and in the middle a red or yellow patch, and the flowers present the most ravishing aspect. The young Tungus boys are in the habit of adorning their bare heads with a kind of hat which they create most artistically by interweaving whole flowering stems of the plant. On this plant one often finds a flower in which two normal flowers seem fused into one, bearing a corolla with nine lobes and eighteen stamens arranged in two rows.

[Translated from the French of a text closely based on the account of Prussian naturalist and explorer Peter Simon Pallas ].

The plant is virulently poisonous and has caused fatalities both in humans and in livestock. The powdered roots have been used as a laxative, as a pesticide and as a fish poison, and have also been used in small doses as a drastic anthelmintic for sheep and goats. The plant is common in Western China, where it goes by the common name of Langdu (狼毒花) lit. "wolf poison" (狼 lang "wolf" + 毒 dú "poison" + 花 huā "flower"). It is used as a medicinal herb in China, but can be considered an undesirable element in the flora if it should proliferate to too great an extent, as its large, water-thirsty roots speed up the desertification of prairies. A work on native Chinese medicinal plants aimed at farmers states that Stellera is a very poisonous plant used as an insecticide and that, if consumed by an animal, will cause the victim's intestines to disintegrate.

Corroboration of this evidence for the damaging effect upon animal intestines of the consumption of certain plants belonging to the Thymelaceae may be found in an account of "Lasiosiphon kraussianus Hutch. & Dalz. " (referable, possibly to Lasiosiphon kraussianus (Meisn.) Meisn. or a Gnidia sp.) of South Africa: the plant is exceedingly poisonous and rapidly fatal to stock: the intestines of an animal perforate about a day after eating it. This lethal property is put to use by certain African tribes who use the powdered root of the plant to poison waterholes during the rainy season, the poison remaining potent for seven days and killing any animal which drinks it.

The plant family to which Stellera belongs - Thymelaceae - is notable for the number of poisonous species which it contains and also for a certain similarity in chemistry to the family Euphorbiaceae, both families having a number of genera producing phorbol esters. It is interesting to note, in this context, that Chinese herbal medicine recognises a similarity in action between Stellera and certain Euphorbia species: Perry (1980) notes that, in a Chinese materia medica of 1959, Stellera, Euphorbia fischeriana Steud. (syn. E. pallasii Turcz.) and Euphorbia sieboldiana Morr. & Decne. are listed under the same heading (no. 86, langdu) - and as possessing the same or very similar medicinal properties: pungent, poisonous plants used as cathartics, anthelmintics, expectorants, also used topically to treat ulcers and skin diseases.

== Chemistry and properties ==
The principal constituents of Stellera chamaejasme include, among others, flavonoids, coumarins, lignans and diterpenoids. A recent work on the medicinal plants of Mongolia notes the presence in the root (rhizome) of sugars, organic acids, saponins and tannins and the following specific compounds: the flavonoids 5,7-dihydroxy-4',11-dimethoxy-3',14-dimethylbenzoflavanone, ruixianglangdusu A and B, 4',4'",5,5",7,7"-hexahydroxy-3,3"-biflavone, 7-methoxyneochamaejasmin A; the coumarins: sfondine, isobergapten, pimpinellin, isopimpinellin, umbelliferone, daphniretin, bicoumastechamin and daphnetin; diterpenes (unspecified); the lignans: (+)-kusunokinin, lirioresinol-B, magnolenin C, (-)-pinoresinol monomethyl ether, (-)-pinoresinol, (+)-matairesinol, isohinokinin, and (-)-eudesmin; and the steroids: daucosterol, β-sitosterol. Above-ground parts of the plant were found to contain the coumarins: daphnorin, daphnetin, daphnoretin, daphnetin 8-O-b-D-glycopyranoside and chamaejasmoside.

A scientific paper of 2015 refers to this plant - regarded as a choice and hard-to-grow ornamental by European and American gardeners - as being one of the most toxic of grassland weeds in the range where it is native and notes that cattle which consume its shoots and flowers may be fatally poisoned. The paper notes further that populations of the plant are in no way endangered, having been flourishing and increasing for some years: this appears to be due not simply to the plant's competing vigorously with other species for water and nutrients, but also to its containing / secreting herbicidal compounds.Water and ethanol extracts of S. chamaejasme inhibited seed germination and/or seedling growth in no fewer than 13 plant species, and the phytotoxic effects were stronger upon dicotyledonous plants than upon monocotyledonous plants. The phytotoxic compounds were observed to be liberated particularly by dead or moribund specimens of S. chamaejasme and to lead to reduced seedling growth in the grasses Lolium perenne L., Psathyrostachys juncea (Fisch.) Nevski and Bromus inermis Leyss. and the legumes Melilotus suaveolens Ledeb. (see Melilotus), Onobrychis viciifolia Scop. (sainfoin) and Medicago sativa L. (alfalfa). Furthermore, pesticidal properties were confirmed to be present in S. chameajasme: the ethanolic extract of S. chameajasme strongly inhibited the growth of the following insect pests: the butterfly Pieris rapae, the aphid Myzus persicae and the corn-borer moth Ostrinia furnacalis, and showed contact and oral toxicities against two other stem-borer moths which are pests of rice: Sesamia inferens and Chilo suppressalis.

== Papermaking ==
In Tibet, the thick, fibrous root of Stellera is harvested, cooked, and beaten for making paper.
