= Dionychastrum =

Scientific classification
- Kingdom: Plantae
- Clade: Tracheophytes
- Clade: Angiosperms
- Clade: Eudicots
- Clade: Rosids
- Order: Myrtales
- Family: Melastomataceae
- Genus: Dionychastrum; A.Fern. & R.Fern.
- Species: D. schliebenii

Binomial name
- Dionychastrum schliebenii A.Fern. & R.Fern.

Genus of plants

Dionychastrum is a monotypic genus of flowering plants belonging to the family Melastomataceae. The only species is Dionychastrum schliebenii.

Its native range is Tanzania.
