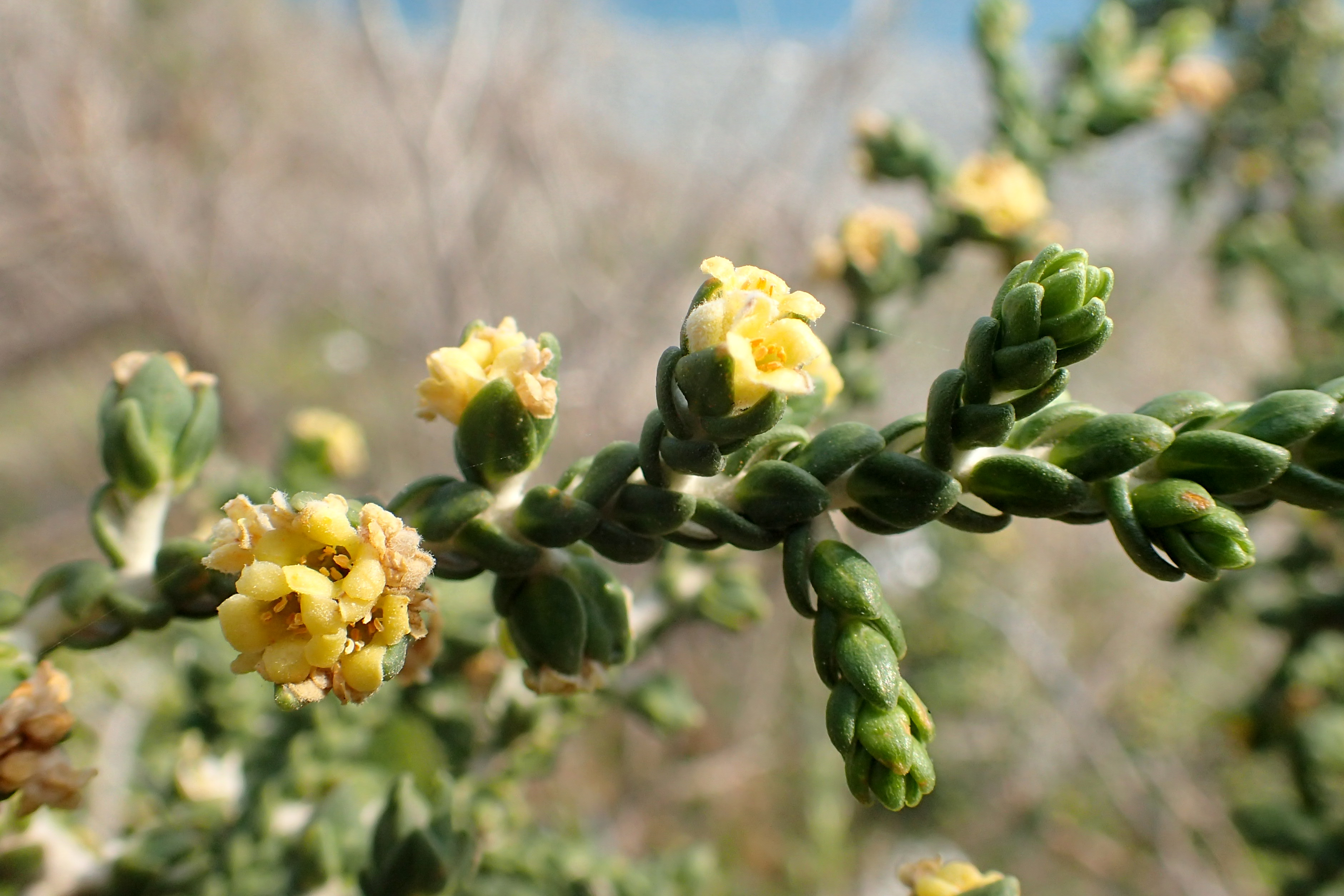

Scientific classification
- Kingdom: Plantae
- Clade: Tracheophytes
- Clade: Angiosperms
- Clade: Eudicots
- Clade: Rosids
- Order: Malvales
- Family: Thymelaeaceae
- Genus: Thymelaea
- Species: T. hirsuta

Binomial name
- Thymelaea hirsuta (L.) Endl.

= Thymelaea hirsuta =

Species of shrub

Thymelaea hirsuta, boalaga (Spanish), bufalaga (Catalan and geolectal Spanish), mitnan (Arabic) or shaggy sparrow-wort, is a xerophytic shrub which can grow to 2 metres in height and has a root system reaching depths of up to 3.5m. Some noteworthy characteristics of this species are the tiny size of its leaves and flowers and that both are also fleshy. Like many other species belonging to the family Thymelaeaceae, it is a toxic plant with medicinal properties that also yields a strong fibre used in the making of rope and paper.

== Etymology ==
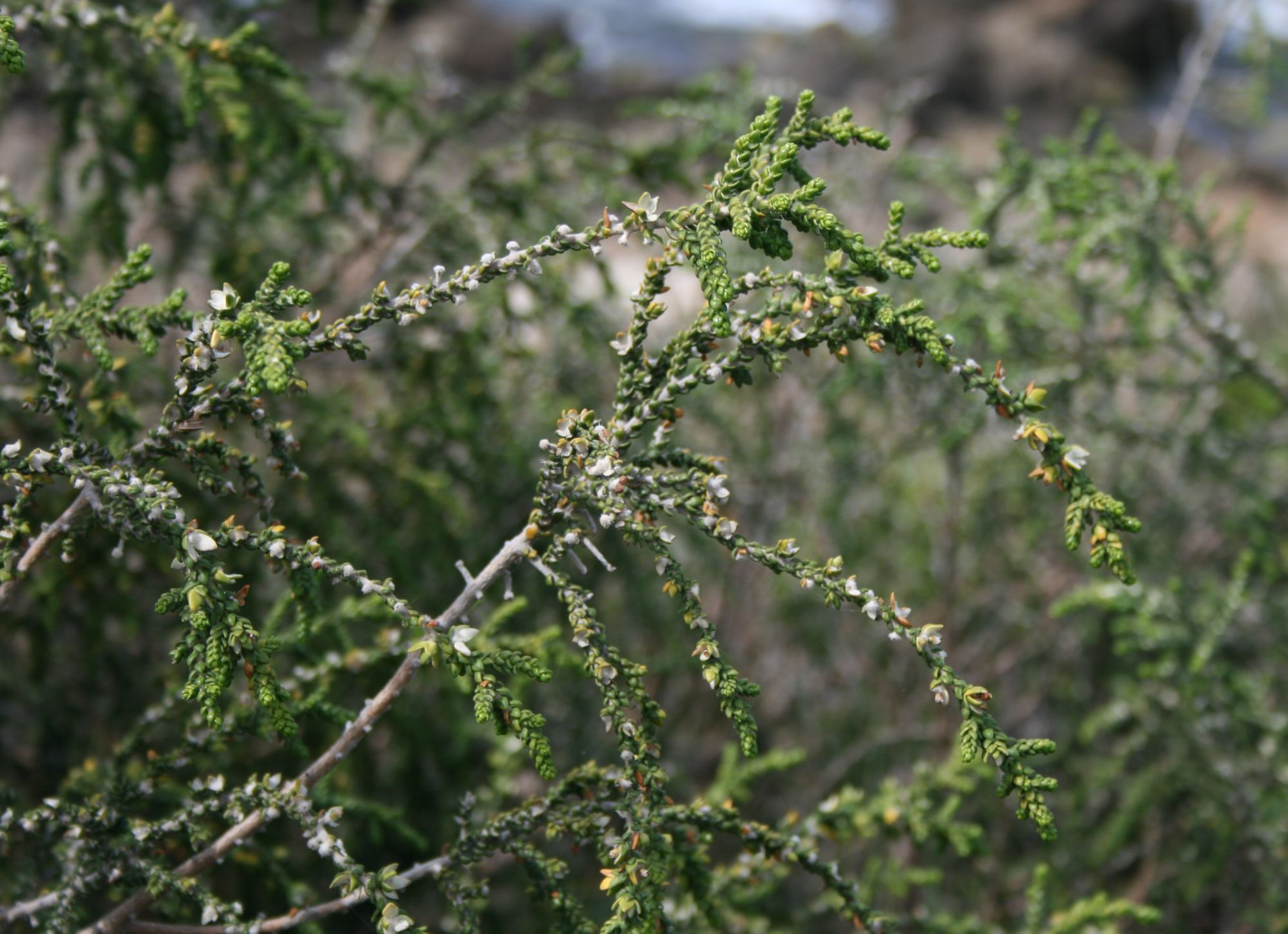
Branches of Thymelaea hirsuta showing the "sparrow's beak" fruits that earned it the earlier generic name of Passerina.

The genus name Thymelaea is a combination of the Greek name for the herb thyme θύμος (thúmos) and that for the olive ἐλαία (elaía) - in reference to its thyme-like foliage and olive-like fruit; while the English name sparrow-wort (used by Thomas Green in his 18th century Universal Herbal) is a translation of the name of the genus Passerina, (in which Thymelaea was formerly placed), derived from the Latin word passer "sparrow" - given the plant because of a perceived similarity of the shape of the fruit to a sparrow's beak. The qualification "shaggy" in the name shaggy sparrow-wort refers to the plant's indumentum of woolly trichomes (plant hairs) - referenced also in the Latin specific name hirsuta "hairy".

== Distribution ==
Circum-Mediterranean: in dry coastal regions of Southern Europe, Turkey, and desert areas of the Levant and North Africa.

== Medicinal uses ==
Thirteenth century Andalusian physician and botanist Ibn al-Baitar noted that, in his day, the leaves of the plant were used to treat pinworm infections and skin conditions, in addition to being employed as a potent hydrogogue cathartic and expectorant; while the bark was used to promote wound healing (see also bioactive dressings). Medicinal use of this plant continues to this day: a decoction of the leaves being used as a mouthwash to dislodge carious teeth. Other uses include remedies for eye diseases and treatments for paralysis.

Thymelaea hirsuta is also valued in the traditional veterinary practices of the Bedouin, in which it is used as a topical medication to prevent miscarriage in camels: the leaves are pounded and mixed with a small quantity of salt to make a poultice applied to the animal's cervix after impregnation, in the belief that this will cause the organ to contract, preventing abortion of the foetus. Scientific analyses of the plant have gone some way to providing a basis for the efficacy of this practice, with the isolation of the phytosterol stigmasterol, which is a precursor of the hormone progesterone, used to treat recurrent abortion in humans.

== Useful fibre ==
The inner bark of Thymelaea hirsuta yields a strong fibre, well suited to the making of ropes and paper. Bedouin cordage made from mitnan ranges from a type of simple cable, braided from the flexible branches of the shrub in an unworked state, to fully finished rope. Such rope is strong enough to support the weight of an adult human, to provide guy ropes for a tent, to tether, girth and yoke beasts of burden, such as donkeys and camels, and to lash together heavy water vessels so they may be carried by such animals.

== Gallery ==
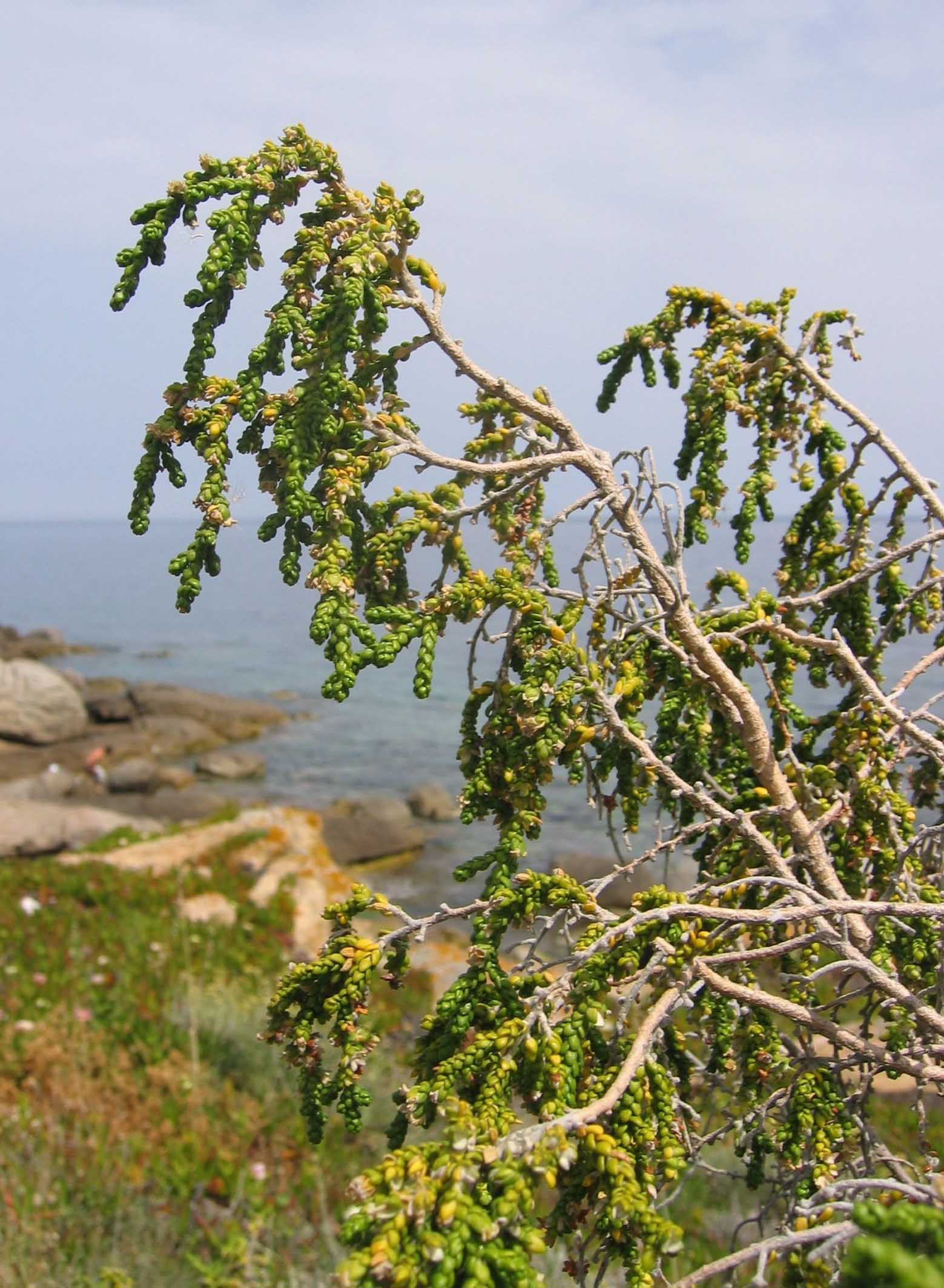
Straggling growth habit of Thymelaea hirsuta growing on sea cliff, Calvi, Corsica.

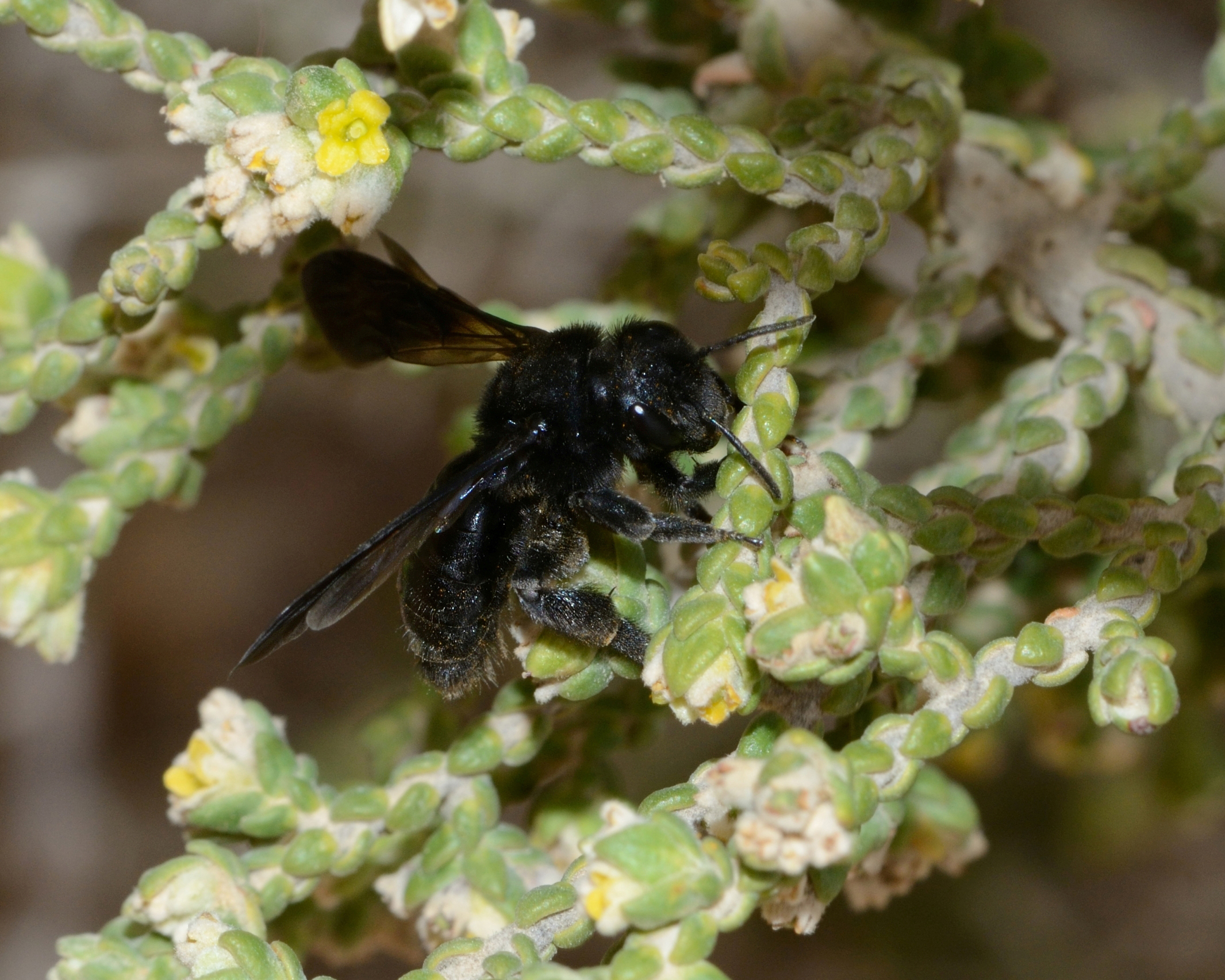
Large, black bee of the genus Andrena foraging on Thymelaea hirsuta, Negev, Israel.
