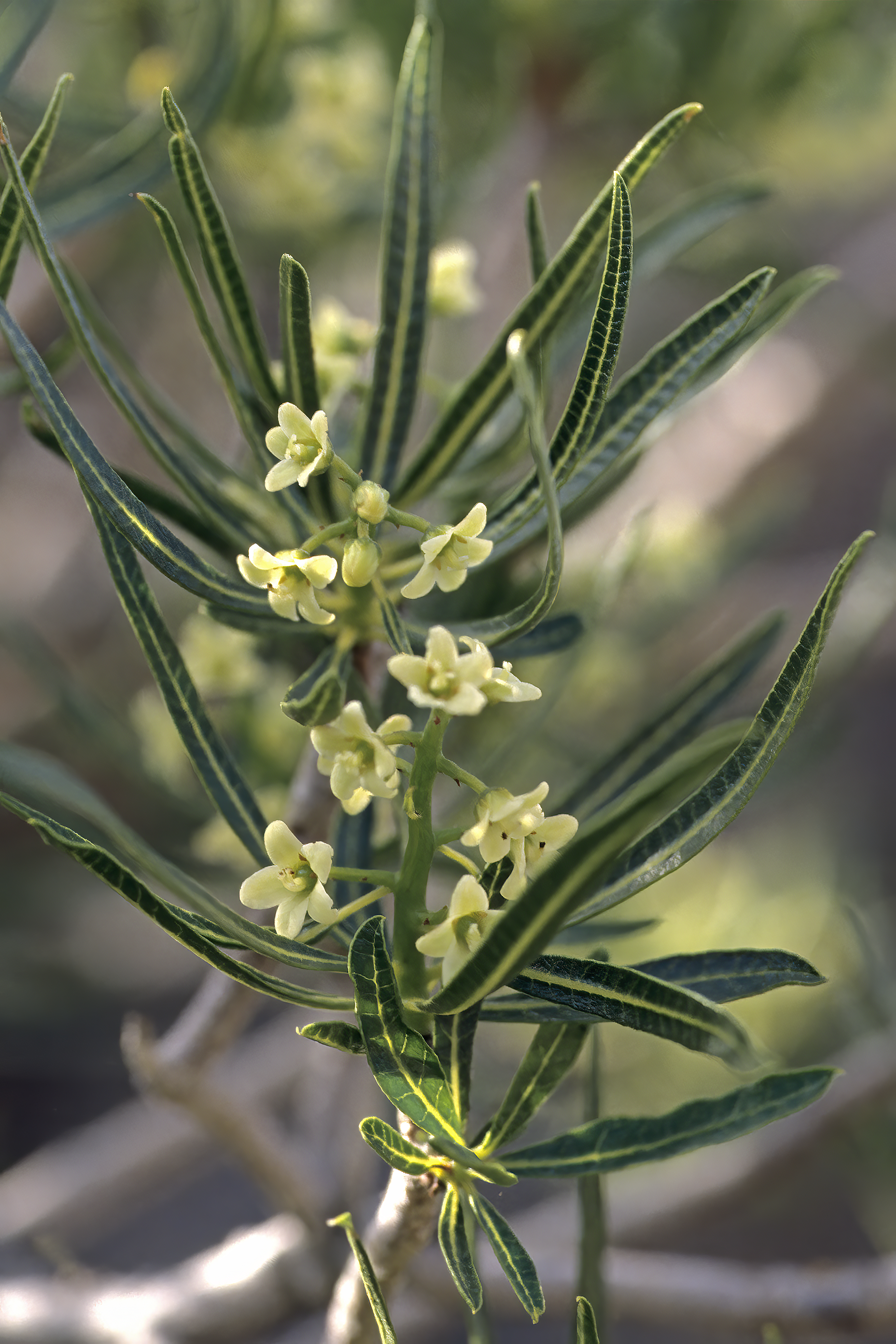
- In Namibia

Conservation status
- Least Concern (IUCN 3.1)

Scientific classification
- Kingdom: Plantae
- Clade: Tracheophytes
- Clade: Angiosperms
- Clade: Eudicots
- Clade: Rosids
- Order: Sapindales
- Family: Anacardiaceae
- Genus: Ozoroa
- Species: O. namaquensis

Binomial name
- Ozoroa namaquensis (Sprague) Von Teichman & A.E.van Wyk

= Ozoroa namaquensis =

Species of tree

Ozoroa namaquensis (Gariep resin tree, Afrikaans: Gariep-harpuisboom) is a species of plant in the family Anacardiaceae. It is found in Namibia and South Africa. It is threatened by habitat loss, and a protected tree in South Africa.
