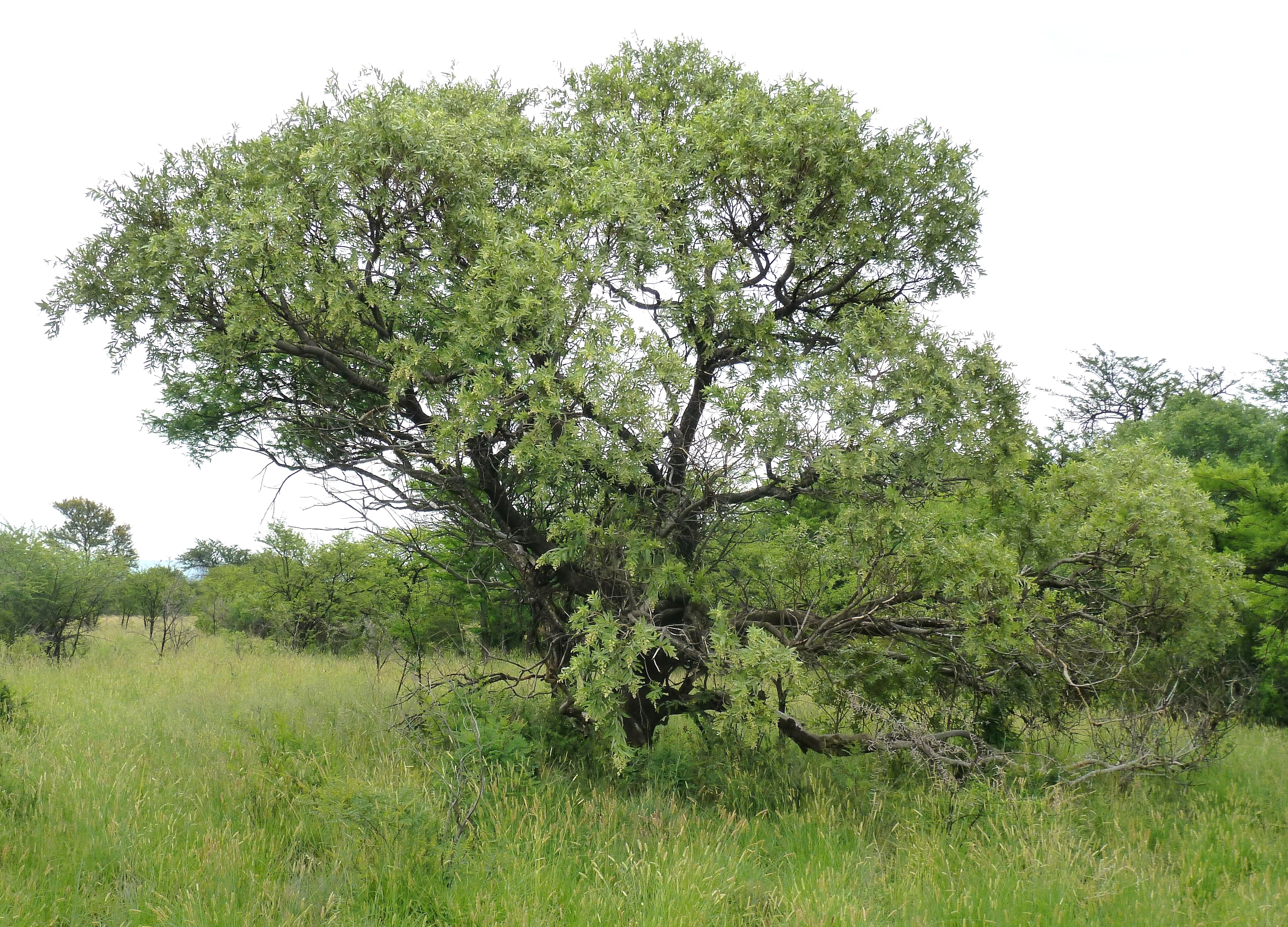
- O. paniculosa in South Africa

Scientific classification
- Kingdom: Plantae
- Clade: Tracheophytes
- Clade: Angiosperms
- Clade: Eudicots
- Clade: Rosids
- Order: Sapindales
- Family: Anacardiaceae
- Subfamily: Anacardioideae
- Genus: Ozoroa; Delile, 1843

= Ozoroa =

Genus of flowering plants

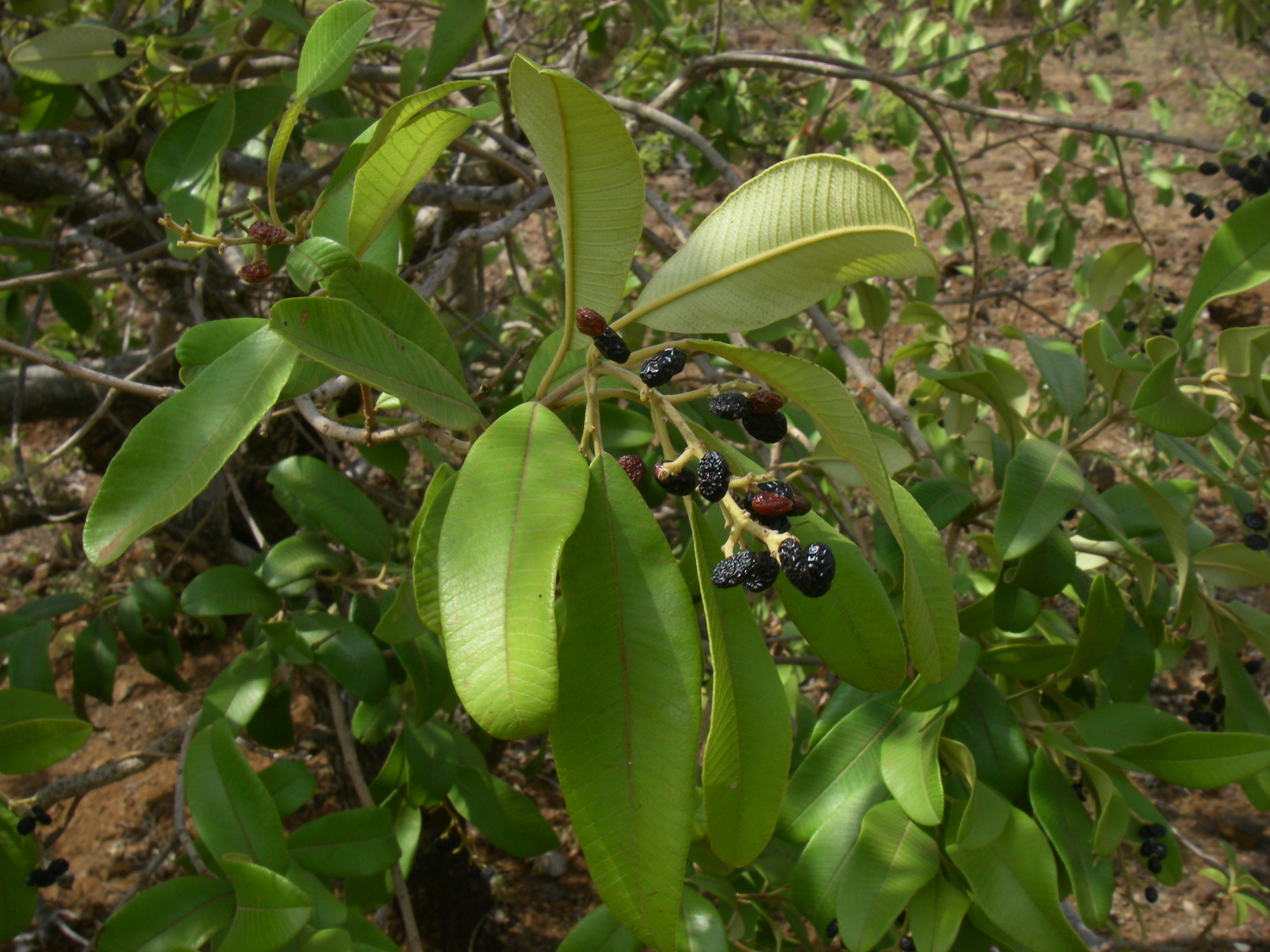
Ozoroa insignis (Kromwo)

Ozoroa is a genus of plants in the family Anacardiaceae.

== Taxonomy ==
=== Species ===
As of July 2020, Plants of the World online has 46 accepted species:

- Ozoroa albicans R.Fern. & A.Fern.
- Ozoroa argyrochrysea (Engl. & Gilg) R.Fern. & A.Fern.
- Ozoroa aurantiaca (Van der Veken) R.Fern. & A.Fern.
- Ozoroa barbertonensis Retief
- Ozoroa benguellensis (Engl.) R.Fern.
- Ozoroa bredoi R.Fern. & A.Fern.
- Ozoroa cinerea (Engl.) R.Fern. & A.Fern.
- Ozoroa concolor (C.Presl ex Steud.) De Winter
- Ozoroa crassinervia (Engl.) R.Fern. & A.Fern.
- Ozoroa dekindtiana (Engl.) R.Fern. & A.Fern.
- Ozoroa dispar (C.Presl) R.Fern. & A.Fern.
- Ozoroa engleri R.Fern. & A.Fern.
- Ozoroa fulva (Van der Veken) R.Fern. & A.Fern.
- Ozoroa gomesiana R.Fern. & A.Fern.
- Ozoroa gossweileri (Exell) R.Fern. & A.Fern.
- Ozoroa hereroensis (Schinz) R.Fern. & A.Fern.
- Ozoroa homblei (De Wild.) R.Fern. & A.Fern.
- Ozoroa hypoleuca (Van der Veken) R.Fern. & A.Fern.
- Ozoroa insignis Delile
- Ozoroa kassneri (Engl. & Brehmer) R.Fern. & A.Fern.
- Ozoroa kwangoensis (Van der Veken) R.Fern. & A.Fern.
- Ozoroa longepetiolata R.Fern. & A.Fern.
- Ozoroa longipes (Engl. & Gilg) R.Fern. & A.Fern.
- Ozoroa macrophylla R.Fern. & A.Fern.
- Ozoroa marginata (Van der Veken) R.Fern. & A.Fern.
- Ozoroa mildredae (Meikle) R.Fern. & A.Fern.
- Ozoroa mucronata (Bernh. ex Krauss) R.Fern. & A.Fern.
- Ozoroa namaensis (Schinz & Dinter) R.Fern.
- Ozoroa namaquensis (Sprague) I. von Teichman & A.E. van Wyk
- Ozoroa nigricans (Van der Veken) R.Fern. & A.Fern.
- Ozoroa nitida (Engl. & Brehmer) R.Fern. & A.Fern.
- Ozoroa obovata (Oliv.) R.Fern. & A.Fern.
- Ozoroa okavangensis R.Fern. & A.Fern.
- Ozoroa pallida (Van der Veken) R.Fern. & A.Fern.
- Ozoroa paniculosa (Sond.) R.Fern. & A.Fern.
- Ozoroa pseudoverticillata (Van der Veken) R.Fern. & A.Fern.
- Ozoroa pulcherrima (Schweinf.) R.Fern. & A.Fern.
- Ozoroa pwetoensis (Van der Veken) R.Fern. & A.Fern.
- Ozoroa robusta (Van der Veken) R.Fern. & A.Fern.
- Ozoroa schinzii (Engl.) R.Fern. & A.Fern.
- Ozoroa sphaerocarpa R.Fern. & A.Fern.
- Ozoroa stenophylla (Engl. & Gilg) R.Fern. & A.Fern.
- Ozoroa uelensis (Van der Veken) R.Fern. & A.Fern.
- Ozoroa verticillata (Engl.) R.Fern. & A.Fern.
- Ozoroa viridis R.Fern. & A.Fern.
- Ozoroa xylophylla (Engl. & Gilg) R.Fern. & A.Fern.
