= Tricliceras auriculatum =

Conservation status
- Data Deficient (IUCN 3.1)

Scientific classification
- Kingdom: Plantae
- Clade: Tracheophytes
- Clade: Angiosperms
- Clade: Eudicots
- Clade: Rosids
- Order: Malpighiales
- Family: Passifloraceae
- Genus: Tricliceras
- Species: T. auriculatum

Binomial name
- Tricliceras auriculatum (A.Fern. & R.Fern.) R.Fern.

Synonyms
- Wormskioldia auriculata

Species of flowering plant

Tricliceras auriculatum is an annual herb native to Nampula Mozambique.
