= Tricliceras bivinianum =

Scientific classification
- Kingdom: Plantae
- Clade: Tracheophytes
- Clade: Angiosperms
- Clade: Eudicots
- Clade: Rosids
- Order: Malpighiales
- Family: Passifloraceae
- Genus: Tricliceras
- Species: T. bivinianum

Binomial name
- Tricliceras bivinianum (Tul.) R.Fern.

Synonyms
- Wormskioldia biviniana

Species of flowering plant

Tricliceras bivinianum is an annual herb in Tricliceras, Turneroideae (Passifloraceae). It's endemic to Sudan Ethiopia, Tanzania, Zanzibar, and Madagascar. T. bivinianum can grow up to 0.5 meters tall and produce yellow flowers.
