= Tricliceras brevicaule =

Scientific classification
- Kingdom: Plantae
- Clade: Tracheophytes
- Clade: Angiosperms
- Clade: Eudicots
- Clade: Rosids
- Order: Malpighiales
- Family: Passifloraceae
- Genus: Tricliceras
- Species: T. brevicaule

Binomial name
- Tricliceras brevicaule (Urb.) R.Fern.

Synonyms
- Wormskioldia brevicaulis

Species of flowering plant

Tricliceras brevicaule is a perennial herb native to Africa. There are two varieties of T. brevicaule: brevicaule and rosulatum. The varieties can be identified by the shape of their petals. Variety brevicaule has petals with pointed ends, while rosulatum has rounded ends. T. brevicaule var. brevicaule can be found in bushlands and grasslands of Kenya, Tanzania, Mozambique and Zambia. T. brevicaule var. rosulatum can be found in the forests, woodlands, and roadsides of Kenya, Tanzania, Malawi, Mozambique and Zambia.
