= Daphnoretin =

Names
- Preferred IUPAC name 7-Hydroxy-6-methoxy-3-[(2-oxo-2H-1-benzopyran-7-yl)oxy]-2H-1-benzopyran-2-one
- Other names Thymelol

Identifiers
CAS Number	2034-69-7
3D model (JSmol)	Interactive image
ChemSpider	4444756
PubChem CID	5281406
UNII	1A7Q3KY3LH
CompTox Dashboard (EPA)	DTXSID00174250
- InChI: InChI=1S/C19H12O7/c1-23-16-6-11-7-17(19(22)26-15(11)9-13(16)20)24-12-4-2-10-3-5-18(21)25-14(10)8-12/h2-9,20H,1H3 Key: JRHMMVBOTXEHGJ-UHFFFAOYSA-N; InChI=1/C19H12O7/c1-23-16-6-11-7-17(19(22)26-15(11)9-13(16)20)24-12-4-2-10-3-5-18(21)25-14(10)8-12/h2-9,20H,1H3 Key: JRHMMVBOTXEHGJ-UHFFFAOYAG
- SMILES: COC1=C(C=C2C(=C1)C=C(C(=O)O2)OC3=CC4=C(C=C3)C=CC(=O)O4)O

Properties
Chemical formula	C_{19}H_{12}O_{7}
Molar mass	352.298 g·mol^{−1}
- Except where otherwise noted, data are given for materials in their standard state (at 25 °C [77 °F], 100 kPa). Infobox references

Daphnoretin is a protein kinase C activator isolated from Wikstroemia indica C.A. Mey, one of the 50 fundamental herbs in traditional Chinese medicine. It has also been found to occur in Stellera chamaejasme - the single species in a genus closely related to Wikstroemia within the family Thymelaceae.
