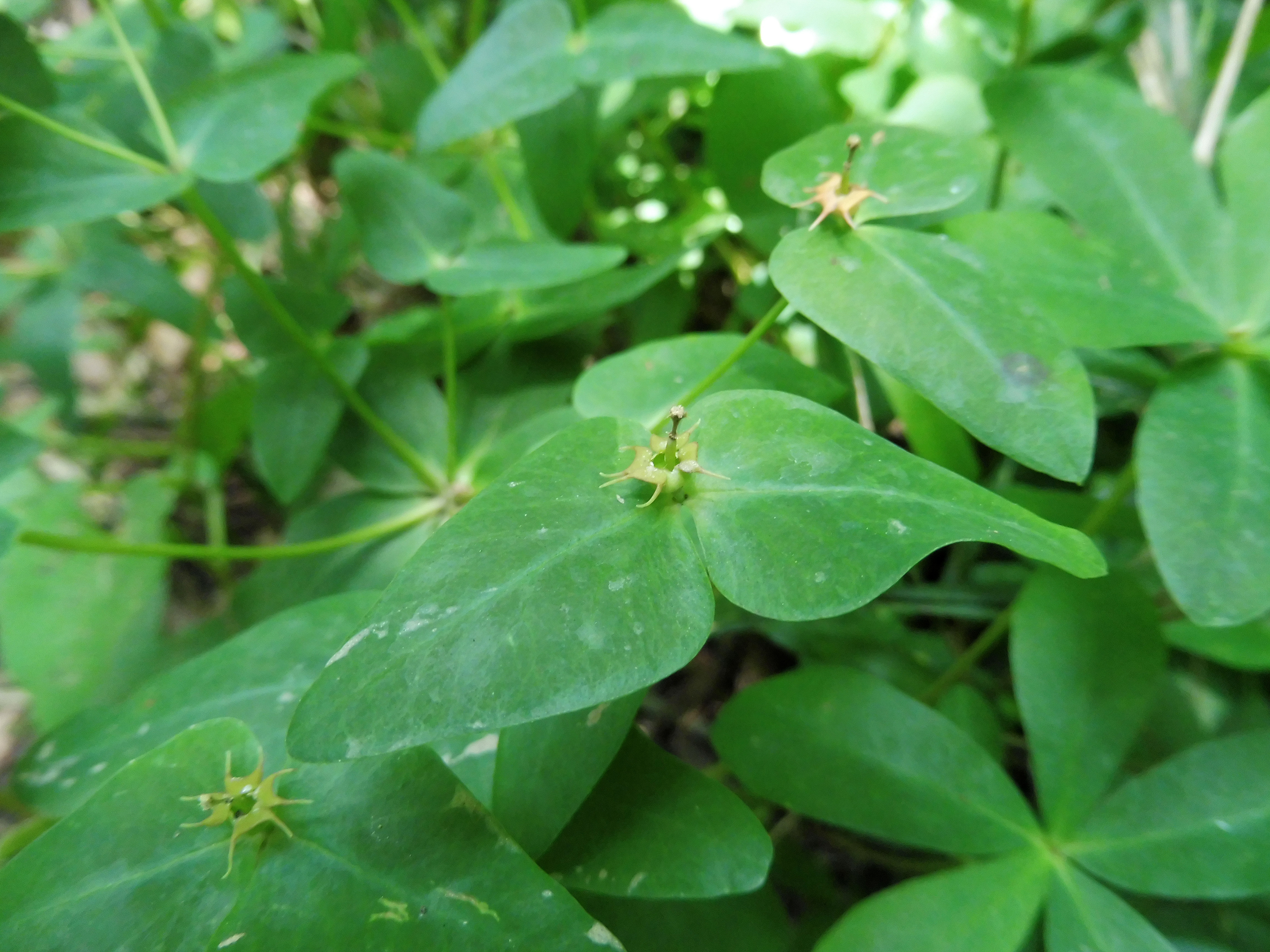

Scientific classification
- Kingdom: Plantae
- Clade: Tracheophytes
- Clade: Angiosperms
- Clade: Eudicots
- Clade: Rosids
- Order: Malpighiales
- Family: Euphorbiaceae
- Genus: Euphorbia
- Species: E. sieboldiana

Binomial name
- Euphorbia sieboldiana C.Morren & Decne.

Synonyms
- List: Galarhoeus sieboldianus (C.Morren & Decne.) H.Hara Tithymalus sieboldianus (C.Morren & Decne.) H.Hara Euphorbia bodinieri H.Lév. & Vaniot Euphorbia erythraea Hemsl. Euphorbia esquirolii H.Lév. & Vaniot Euphorbia glaucopoda Diels Euphorbia guilielmi A.Gray Euphorbia henryi Hemsl. Euphorbia hippocrepica Hemsl. Euphorbia idzuensis Nakai ex Hurus. Euphorbia kangdingensis W.T.Wang Euphorbia kangdingensis var. puberula W.T.Wang Euphorbia luticola Hand.-Mazz. Euphorbia savaryi Kiss Euphorbia sieboldiana var. grandifolia (Franch. & Sav. ex Hurus.) Oudejans Euphorbia sieboldiana f. idzuensis Hurus. Euphorbia sieboldiana var. idzuensis (Hurus.) Oudejans Euphorbia sieboldiana var. montana Tatew. Euphorbia sieboldiana var. ohsumiensis (Hurus.) Hatus. Euphorbia sieboldiana f. peninsularis Hurus. Euphorbia sieboldiana var. peninsularis (Hurus.) Kitag. Euphorbia sieboldiana f. sylvatica Hurus. Euphorbia sieboldiana var. sylvatica (Hurus.) Oudejans Euphorbia sieboldiana f. yezoensis Hurus. Euphorbia szechuanica Pax & K.Hoffm. Euphorbia taquetii H.Lév. & Vaniot Euphorbia tsukamotoi Honda Galarhoeus hippocrepicus (Hemsl.) Hurus. Galarhoeus luticola (Hand.-Mazz.) Hurus. Galarhoeus sieboldianus f. grandifolius Franch. & Sav. ex Hurus. Galarhoeus sieboldianus var. idzuensis Hurus. Galarhoeus sieboldianus var. miyajimensis Hurus. Galarhoeus sieboldianus var. montanus (Tatew.) H.Hara Galarhoeus sieboldianus var. ohsumiensis Hurus. Galarhoeus sieboldianus f. peninsularis (Hurus.) Hurus. Galarhoeus sieboldianus var. shikokianus Hurus. Tithymalus erythraeus (Hemsl.) Soják Tithymalus henryi (Hemsl.) Soják Tithymalus hippocrepicus (Hemsl.) Soják Tithymalus szechuanicus (Pax & K.Hoffm.) Soják

= Euphorbia sieboldiana =

Species of flowering plant

Euphorbia sieboldiana, known as Siebold's spurge, is a species of flowering plant in the spurge family Euphorbiaceae. It is native to eastern Asia, where it is found in China, Japan, Korea, and eastern Russia. Its natural habitat is in grassy areas and forest margins. It is a common species in Japan.

== Description ==
It is an rhizomatous perennial growing to 70 cm tall. It produces small flowers in compact pseudoumbels. These lack petal-like appendages. This species can be readily identified by the horn-like projections on the glands of the involucre. Blooming time is in spring and early summer.

== Toxicity and medicinal uses ==
The plant is used medicinally in China, where it has the common name Langdu (狼毒花) lit. "wolf poison" (狼 lang "wolf" + 毒 dú "poison" + 花 huā "flower"). It shares this vernacular name with two other medicinal plants: Euphorbia fischeriana and the unrelated Stellera chamaejasme (family Thymelaceae) - which nonetheless has similar qualities, medicinal properties and uses, these being pungency, toxicity, cathartic, anthelmintic and expectorant activity, and topical use to treat ulcers and skin diseases.
