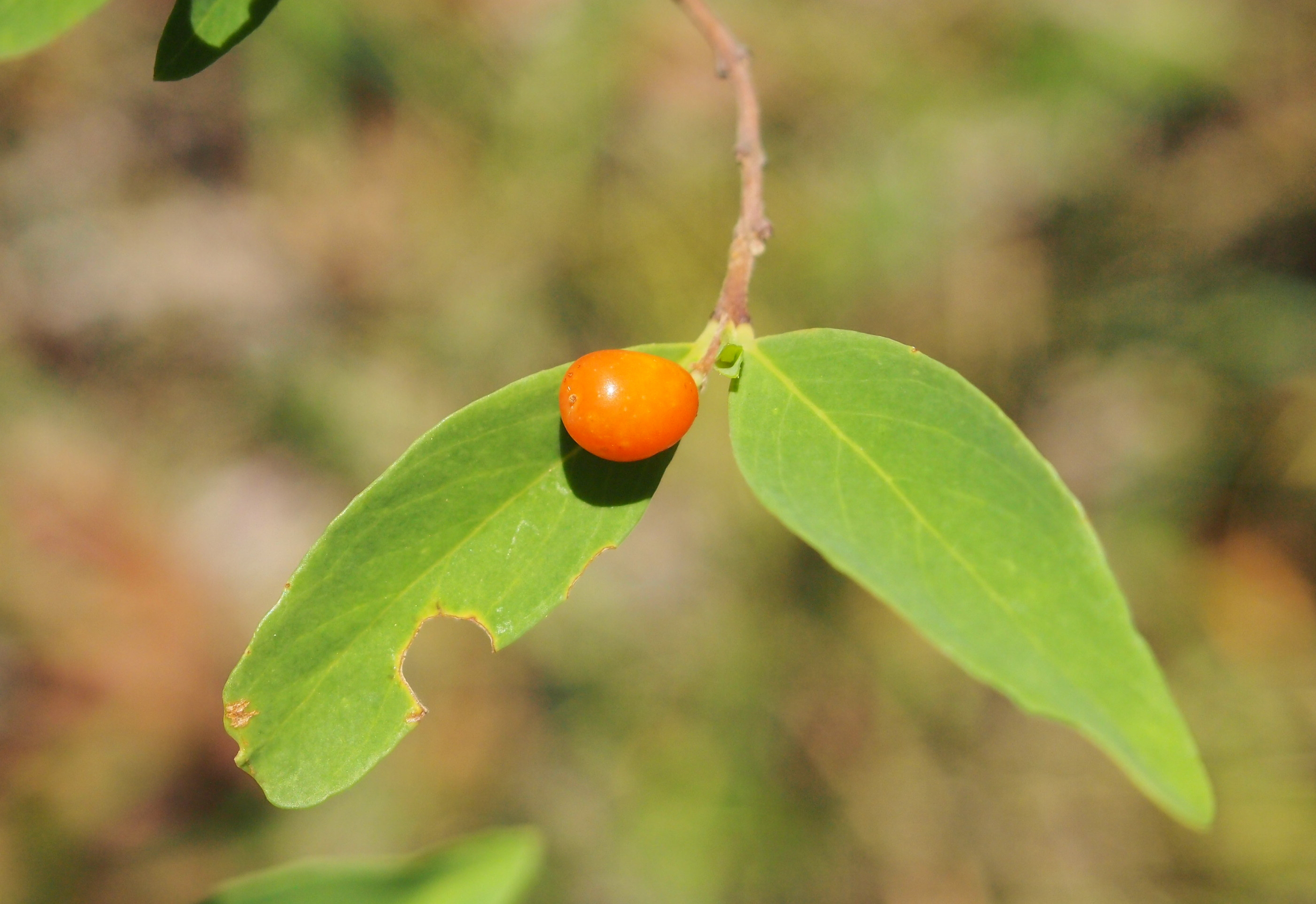

Scientific classification
- Kingdom: Plantae
- Clade: Tracheophytes
- Clade: Angiosperms
- Clade: Eudicots
- Clade: Rosids
- Order: Malvales
- Family: Thymelaeaceae
- Genus: Wikstroemia
- Species: W. indica

Binomial name
- Wikstroemia indica (L.) C.A.Mey.

Synonyms
- Synonyms list: Capura purpurata L. (1771); Daphne cannabina Lour. (1790); Daphne indica L. (1753) (basionym); Daphne indica alba J.R.Duncan & V.C.Davies (1925); Daphne indica subsp. linearifolia (Elmer) Halda (1999); Daphne indica subsp. novae-caledoniae (Gand.) Halda (1999); Daphne viridiflora Wall. (1829), not validly publ.; Daphne zhouana Halda (1999); Diplomorpha viridiflora (Wall. ex Meisn.) C.A.Mey. (1843); Wikstroemia amplifolia (Schltr.) Domke (1934); Wikstroemia forsteri Decne. (1844); Wikstroemia indica var. amplifolia Schltr. (1906); Wikstroemia indica var. insularis Schltr. (1906); Wikstroemia indica var. viridiflora (Wall. ex Meisn.) Hook.f. (1886); Wikstroemia linearifolia Elmer (1910); Wikstroemia linearifolia H.F.Zhou ex C.Y.Chang (1986), nom. illeg.; Wikstroemia novae-caledoniae Gand. (1913); Wikstroemia ovalifolia Decne. (1844); Wikstroemia ovata Fern.-Vill. (1880), nom. illeg.; Wikstroemia pachyphylla Merr. (1917); Wikstroemia pulgarensis Elmer (1913); Wikstroemia purpurata (L.) Druce (1917); Wikstroemia shuttleworthiana Meisn. (1857); Wikstroemia shuttleworthii Meisn. (1841); Wikstroemia subcoriacea Merr. (1917); Wikstroemia valbrayi H.Lév. (1915); Wikstroemia viridiflora Wall. ex Meisn. (1841); Wikstroemia viridiflora var. acuta Lecomte (1915); Wikstroemia zhouana (Halda) C.Shang & S.Liao (2016); Xylosma cochine Lour. ex Gomes Mach. (1868)

= Wikstroemia indica =

Species of plant

Wikstroemia indica, also known as tie bush, Indian stringbush, bootlace bush, or small-leaf salago (Chinese: 了哥王; pinyin: liǎo gē wáng; Vietnamese: dó liệt) is a small shrub with glossy leaves, small greenish-yellow flowers and toxic red fruits. It grows in forests and on rocky, shrubby slopes in central and southeastern China, Vietnam, India, Australia and the Philippines.

== Toxicity ==
W. indica is toxic and the poisoning caused by W. indica leads to dizziness, blurred vision, nausea, vomiting, abdominal distension, abdominal pain and diarrhea.

== Uses ==
It is one of the 50 fundamental herbs used in traditional Chinese medicine. As a traditional Chinese herb, this plant has long been employed as an antipyretic, detoxicant, expectorant, vermifuge, and abortifacient in clinical practice in China.

In Vinh, paper made by hand from the phloem fibers of W. indica is used for packaging freshly caught fish. To make the paper, peeled bark of W. indica is harvested in Quỳnh Lưu and shipped in dehydrated bales to Nghi Lộc, where the fibers are rehydrated, scraped, cooked, beaten into pulp, bleached, rinsed, suspended in water, and cast into sheets using large moulds made of mosquito netting and rebar, which are then left in the sun. Once dry, the resulting sheets are peeled from their moulds, folded in quarters, and sold to fishermen in Vinh. The paper helps to keep fish fresh, and prevents it from drying out during cooking.

== Chemicals ==
An alcoholic extract of the plant was found to contain daphnoretin, chrysophanol, myricitrime and rutin. The extract of W. indica displays antimicrobial and anti-inflammatory activities in vitro.

== Gallery ==
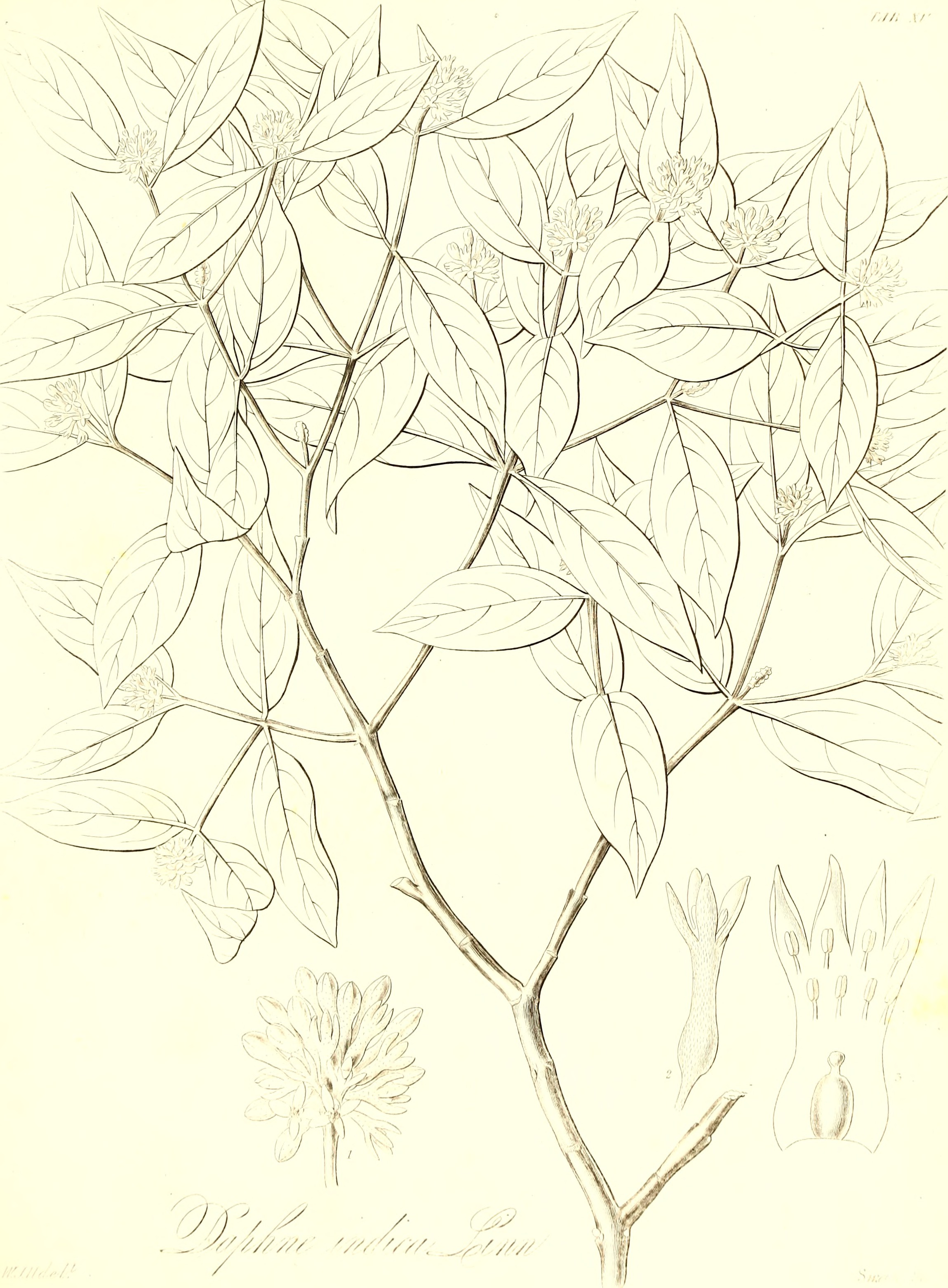
Botanical line drawing showing foliage and flowers. Plant labelled with obsolete name Daphne indica.
