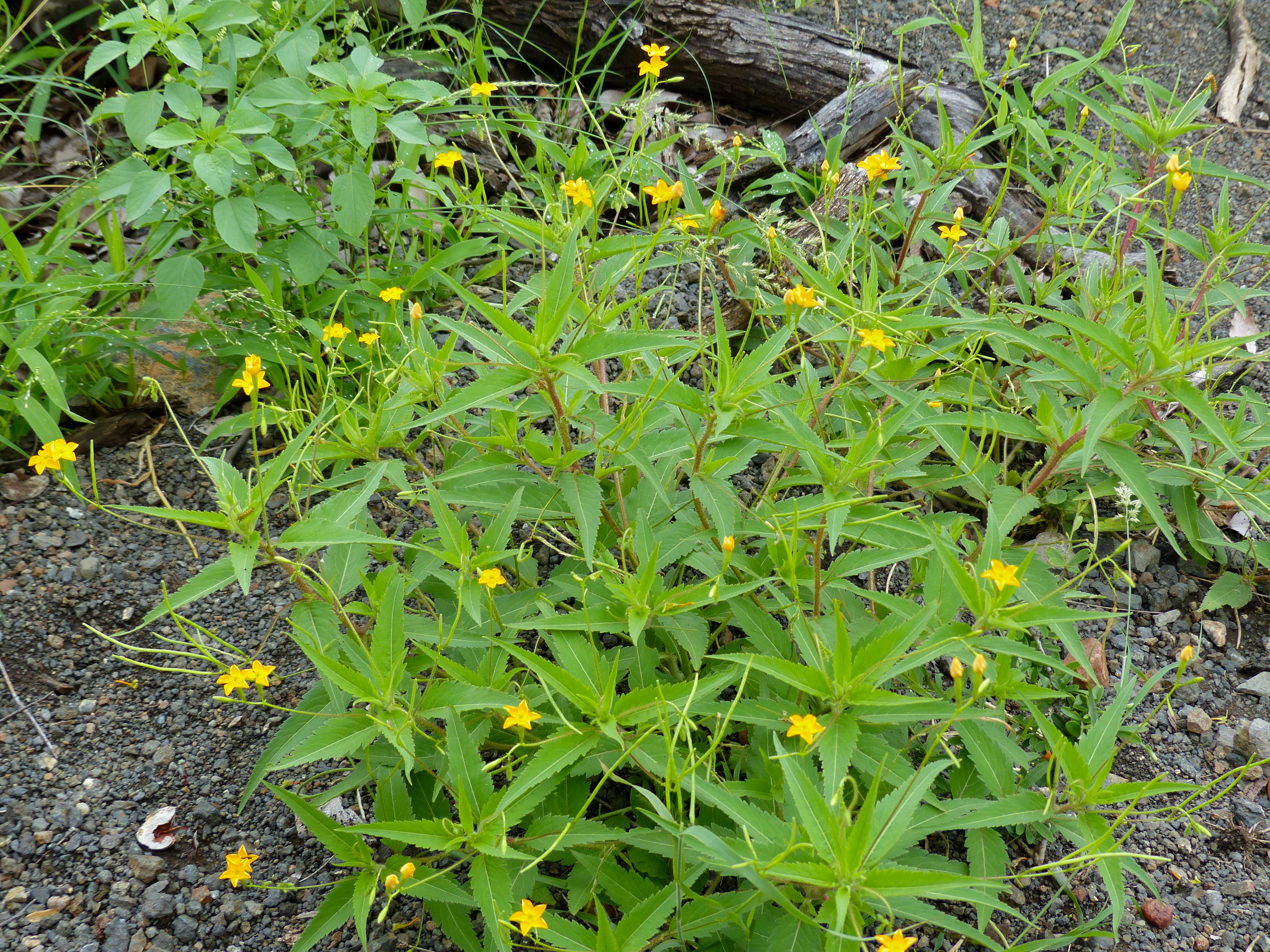
- Tricliceras glanduliferum

Scientific classification
- Kingdom: Plantae
- Clade: Tracheophytes
- Clade: Angiosperms
- Clade: Eudicots
- Clade: Rosids
- Order: Malpighiales
- Family: Passifloraceae
- Subfamily: Turneroideae
- Genus: Tricliceras; Thonn. ex DC.

= Tricliceras =

Genus of flowering plants

Tricliceras is a genus of flowering plants belonging to the family Passifloraceae. Its native range is Tropical Africa, Southern Africa, Madagascar.

== Species ==
- Tricliceras auriculatum (A.Fern. & R.Fern.) R.Fern.
- Tricliceras bivinianum (Tul.) R.Fern.
- Tricliceras brevicaule (Urb.) R.Fern.
- Tricliceras elatum (A.Fern. & R.Fern.) R.Fern.
- Tricliceras glanduliferum (Klotzsch) R.Fern.
- Tricliceras hirsutum (A.Fern. & R.Fern.) R.Fern.
- Tricliceras lanceolatum (A.Fern. & R.Fern.) R.Fern.
- Tricliceras lobatum (Urb.) R.Fern.
- Tricliceras longepedunculatum (Mast.) R.Fern.
- Tricliceras mossambicense (A.Fern. & R.Fern.) R.Fern
- Tricliceras pilosum (Willd.) R.Fern.
- Tricliceras prittwitzii (Urb.) R.Fern.
- Tricliceras schinzii (Urb.) R.Fern.
- Tricliceras tanacetifolium (Klotzsch) R.Fern.
- Tricliceras xylorhizum Verdc.
