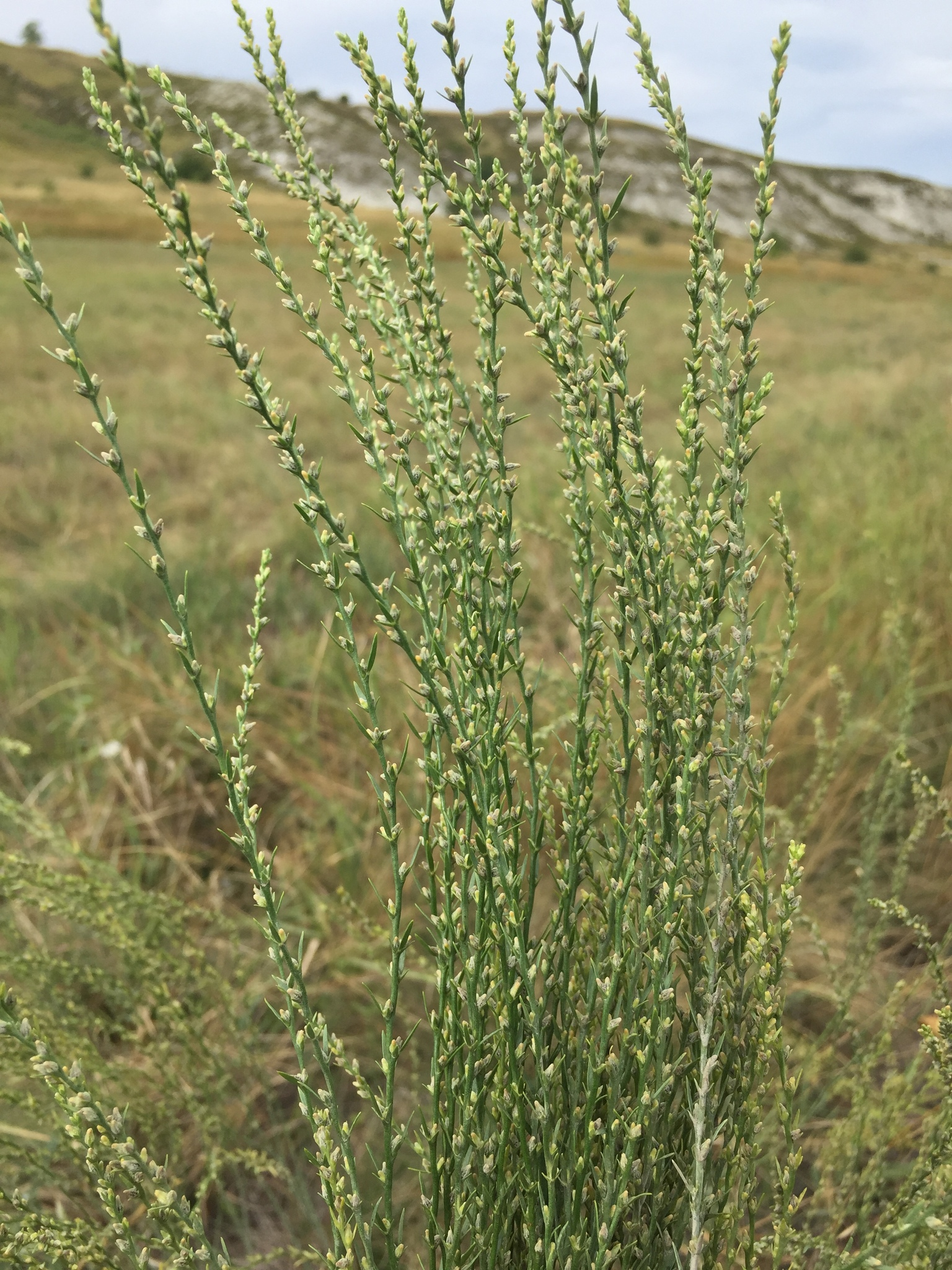
- In bloom
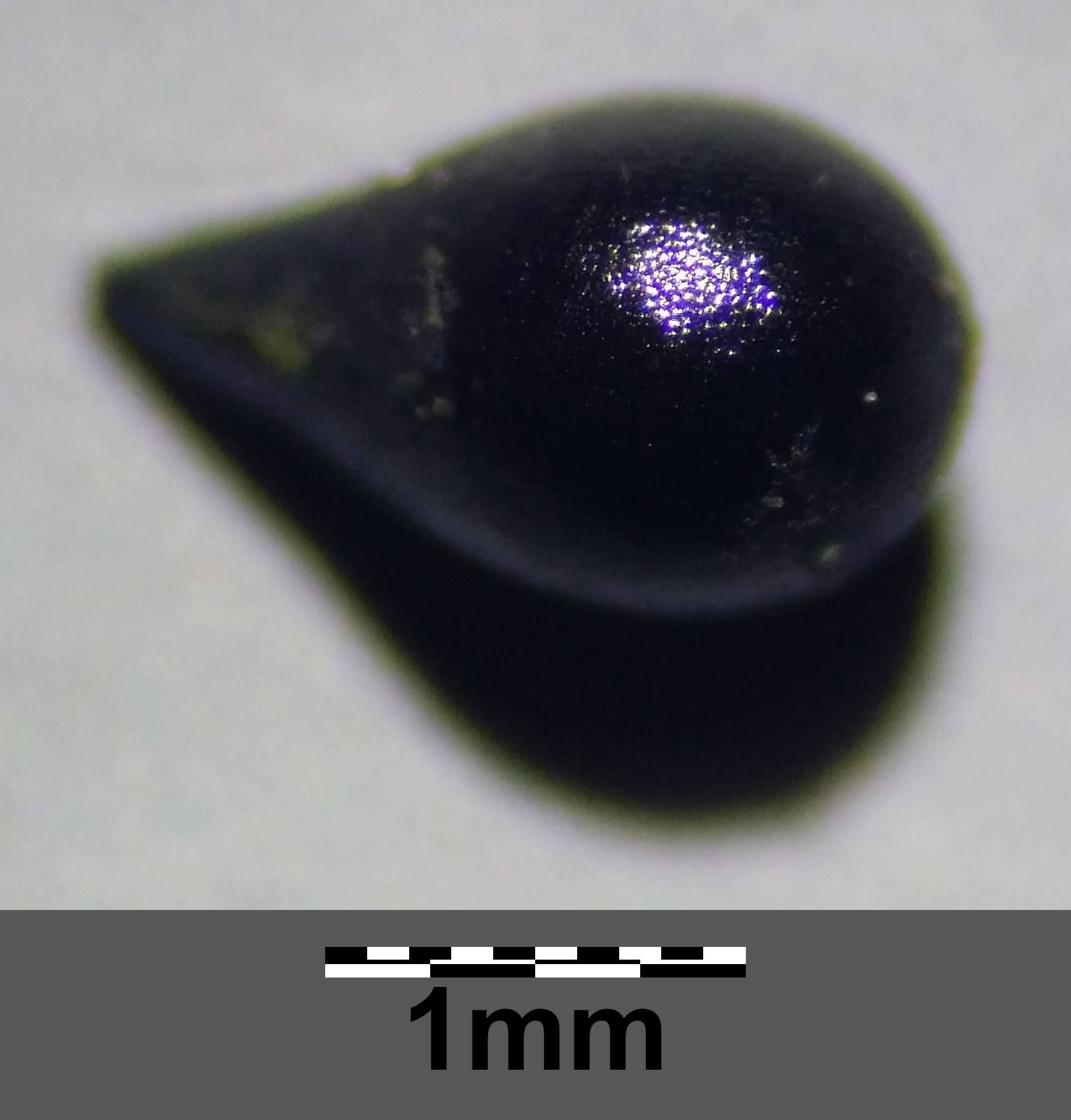
- Seed

Scientific classification
- Kingdom: Plantae
- Clade: Tracheophytes
- Clade: Angiosperms
- Clade: Eudicots
- Clade: Rosids
- Order: Malvales
- Family: Thymelaeaceae
- Genus: Thymelaea
- Species: T. passerina

Binomial name
- Thymelaea passerina (L.) Coss. & Germ.

Synonyms
- List: Daphne passerina (L.) E.H.L.Krause; Giardia arvensis (Lam.) C.Gerber; Ligia passerina (L.) Fasano; Passerina annua Wikstr.; Passerina arvensis (Lam.) Ball; Passerina concinna Walp.; Passerina diarthronoides Griff.; Passerina passerina (L.) Huth; Passerina pubescens Guss.; Passerina stellera Ramond ex DC.; Stellera annua Salisb.; Stellera passerina L.; Stellera passerina var. tenuior Rchb.; Thymelaea arvensis Lam.; Thymelaea passerina var. perennans Welw. ex Cout.

= Thymelaea passerina =

Species of plant

Thymelaea passerina, the spurge flax, sparrow weed, mezereon, or annual thymelaea, is a species of flowering plant in the family Thymelaeaceae. It is native to central and southern Europe, the Middle East, Central Asia, the western Himalayas, and Xinjiang in China, and it has been introduced to central North America, and to South Australia. An erect annual from 6 to 61 cm (2.5 to 24 in) tall, it is typically found in steppes, disturbed areas, and old fields.

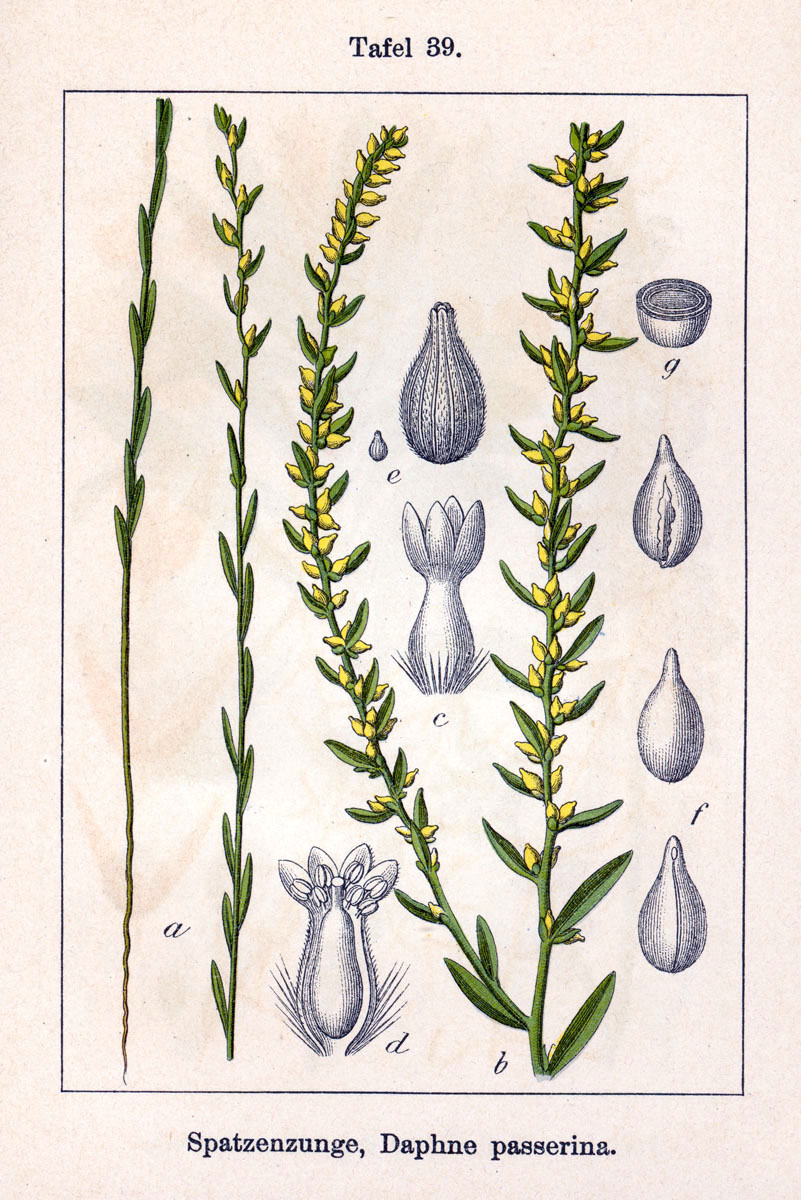
Botanical illustration

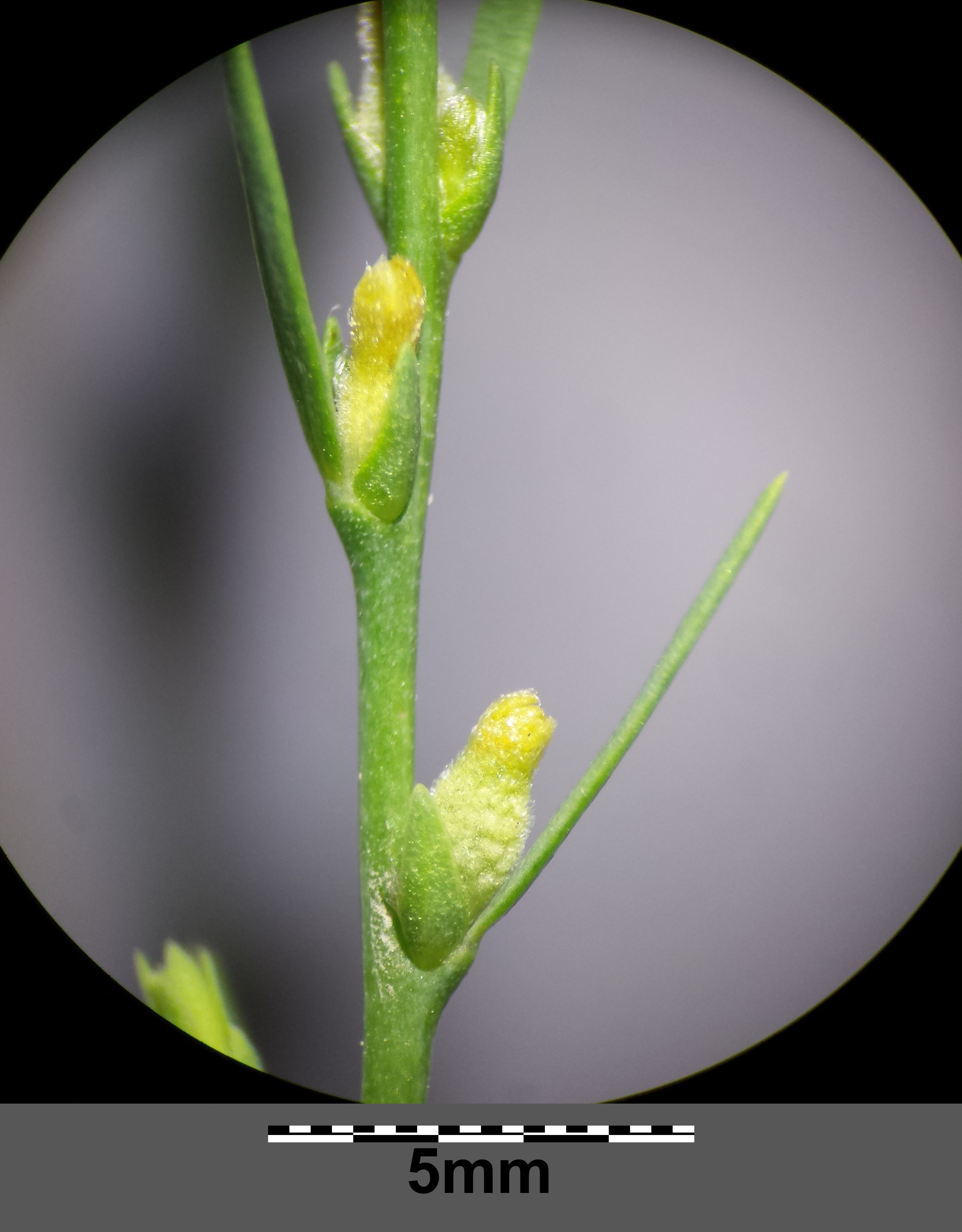
Stipe with leaves and flowers

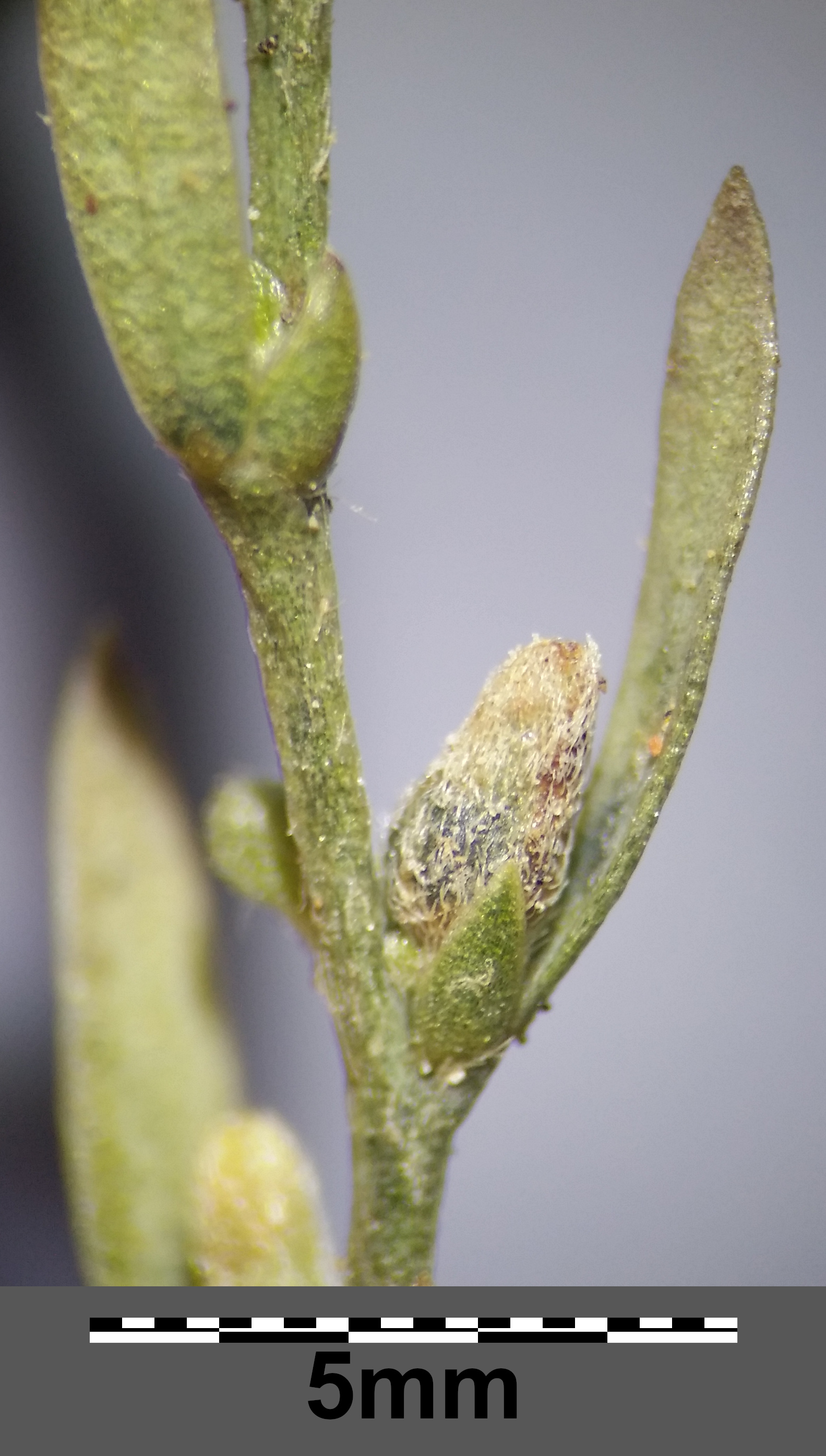
Stem with leaves and hypanthium

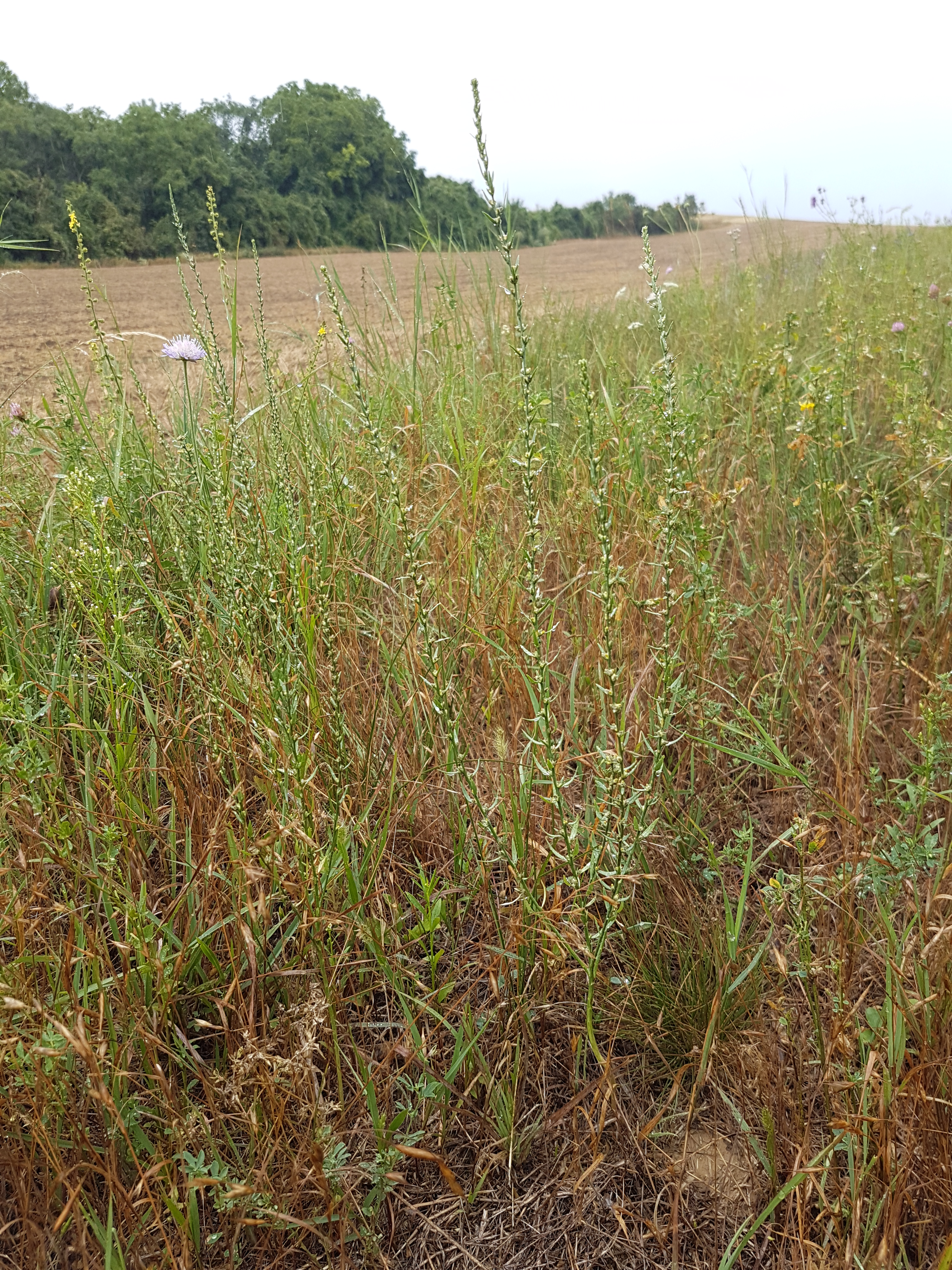
Growing in fallow land
