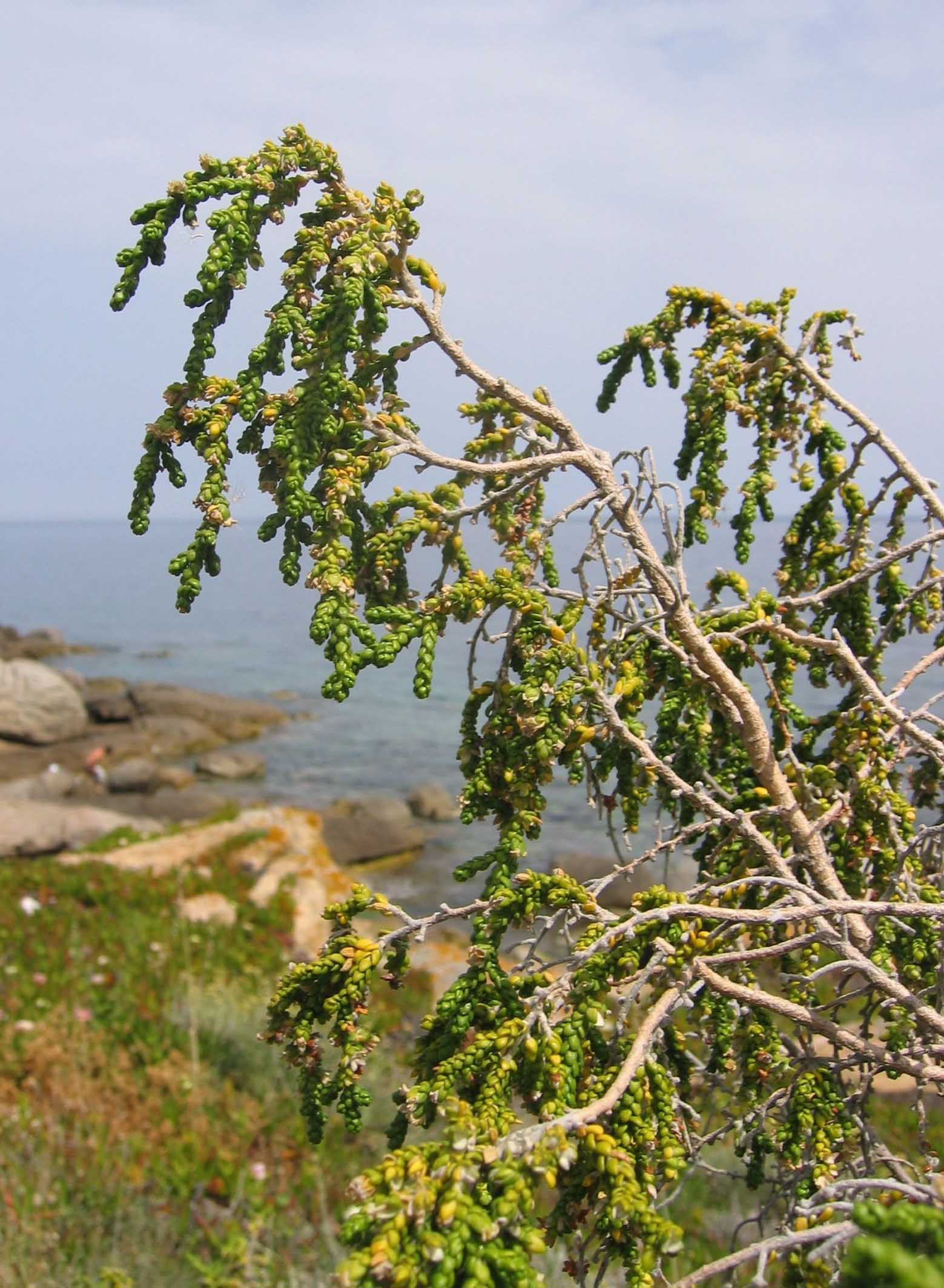
- Thymelaea hirsuta

Scientific classification
- Kingdom: Plantae
- Clade: Tracheophytes
- Clade: Angiosperms
- Clade: Eudicots
- Clade: Rosids
- Order: Malvales
- Family: Thymelaeaceae
- Subfamily: Thymelaeoideae
- Genus: Thymelaea; Mill. (1754), nom. cons.

Type species
- Thymelaea sanamunda

Species
- 33; see text

Synonyms
- Chlamydanthus C.A.Mey. (1843); Gastrilia Raf. (1838); Giardia C.Gerber (1899), non Giardia Künstler (1882).; Ligia Fasano (1788); Pausia Raf. (1838); Piptochlamys C.A.Mey. (1843); Sanamunda Neck. (1790), opus utique oppr.; Tartonia Raf. (1840)

= Thymelaea =

Genus of flowering plants

Thymelaea (the sparrow-worts) is a genus of about 30 species of evergreen shrubs and herbs in the flowering plant family Thymelaeaceae, native to the Canary Islands, the Mediterranean region, north to central Europe, and east to central Asia.

== Etymology ==
The genus name Thymelaea is a combination of the Greek name for the herb thyme θύμος (thúmos) and that for the olive ἐλαία (elaía) - in reference to its thyme-like foliage and olive-like fruit; while the English name Sparrow-wort (used by Thomas Green in his Universal Herbal, published 1820) is a translation of the name of the genus Passerina (in which Thymelaea was formerly placed), derived from the word passer "sparrow" - given the plants in reference to a perceived similarity of the shape of the fruit to a sparrow's beak.

== Species ==
33 species are accepted.

- Thymelaea antiatlantica Maire
- Thymelaea argentata (Lam.) Pau
- Thymelaea aucheri Meisn.
- Thymelaea broteriana Cout.
- Thymelaea bulgarica Cheshm.
- Thymelaea calycina (Lapeyr.) Meisn.
- Thymelaea cilicica Meisn.
- Thymelaea × conradiae Aboucaya & Médail
- Thymelaea coridifolia (Lam.) Endl.
- Thymelaea dioica (Gouan) All.
- Thymelaea elliptica (Boiss.) Endl.
- Thymelaea gattefossei H.K.Tan
- Thymelaea granatensis (Pau) Lacaita
- Thymelaea gussonei Boreau
- Thymelaea hirsuta (L.) Endl.
- Thymelaea lanuginosa (Lam.) Ceballos & C.Vicioso
- Thymelaea lythroides Barratte & Murb.
- Thymelaea mesopotamica (C.Jeffrey) B.Peterson
- Thymelaea microphylla Coss. & Durieu
- Thymelaea passerina (L.) Coss. & Germ. – spurge flax
- Thymelaea procumbens A.Fern. & R.Fern.
- Thymelaea pubescens (L.) Meisn.
- Thymelaea putorioides Emb. & Maire
- Thymelaea ruizii Loscos ex Casav.
- Thymelaea salsa Murb.
- Thymelaea sanamunda All.
- Thymelaea sempervirens Murb.
- Thymelaea subrepens Lange
- Thymelaea tarton-raira (L.) All.
- Thymelaea tinctoria (Pourr.) Endl.
- Thymelaea velutina (Pourr. ex Cambess.) Endl.
- Thymelaea villosa (L.) Endl.
- Thymelaea virescens Meisn.
- Thymelaea virgata (Desf.) Endl.
