= Hydrogogue =

Hydrogogue is a substance that promotes watery evacuation of bowels.Fumaric acid salts can be used as hydrogogue cathartics.
