= Abílio Fernandes =

Portuguese botanist and taxonomist

- Born: 19 October 1906; Guarda, Portugal
- Died: 16 October 1994 (aged 87); Coimbra, Portugal
- Spouse: Rosette Batarda Fernandes
- Children: 2
- Scientific career
- Fields: Botany; Taxonomy
- Institutions: University of Coimbra
- Author abbrev. (botany): A.Fern.

Abílio Fernandes (19 October 1906, Guarda, Portugal – 16 October 1994, Coimbra), was a Portuguese botanist and taxonomist from the Botanical Institute at the University of Coimbra who was married to Rosette Mercedes Saraiva Batarda (1916–2005), another Portuguese botanist and taxonomist. Fernandes was a student of Aurélio Quintanilha (1892–1987), botanist and geneticist.

== Career ==
Flórula Vascular da Mata da Bufarda

Fernandes is noted for his work on Amaryllidaceae, and compiling floras of Portugal, Macaronesia and Tropical Africa. He was the son of José Fernandes (1880-) and Maria Augusta Fernandes (1880–).

Fernandes was Quintanilha's student during the academic year 1926–27 and was invited to become teaching assistant in 1927. He became interested in the number and form of chromosomes in different species, later specialising in cyto-systematics, founding and becoming head of a research programme on cytotaxonomy at the University of Coimbra, where he stayed for the remainder of his career. Quintanilha stated that Fernandes's earliest works – including his thesis published in 1930, Study on the chromosomes of Liláceas and Amarilidáceas – are the first published in Portugal in which chromosomes were regarded as “carriers of the heritable characters”, representing thus “the beginning of a new branch of science among us, cytogenetics”

Abílio Fernandes was married to the botanist Rosette Mercedes Saraiva Batarda (1 October 1916 – 28 May 2005) and had 2 sons Eduardo Manuel Batarda Fernandes (1943) and José António Batarda Fernandes (1946). Some of her work was published in Flora Zambesiaca and she did a taxonomic revision of the families Avicenniaceae, Verbenaceae and Lamiaceae.

== Publications ==
- Flórula Vascular da Mata da Bufarda – Abílio Fernandes & Rosette Batarda Fernandes
- A Universidade de Coimbra e o Estudo da Flora e da Vegetação dos Paízes Africanos de Língua Oficial Portuguesa – Abílio Fernandes (1993)
