= Rosette Batarda Fernandes =

Portuguese scientist (1916–2005)

- Rosette Batarda Fernandes
- Born: 1 October 1916; Redondo, Alentejo, Portugal
- Died: 28 May 2005 (aged 88)
- Education: University of Lisbon
- Spouse: Abílio Fernandes
- Scientific career
- Fields: Botany; Taxonomy
- Author abbrev. (botany): R.Fern.

Rosette Mercedes Saraiva Batarda (1 October 1916 in Redondo, Alentejo – 28 May 2005) was a Portuguese botanist and taxonomist who was married to Abílio Fernandes (1906–1994), another Portuguese botanist and taxonomist.

== Career ==
She enrolled in the Escola Secundária Maria Amália Vaz de Carvalho in 1928 and graduated in 1941 in Biological Sciences from the University of Lisbon. In June of the same year, attending a Congress of Natural Sciences in Lisbon, she met Abilio Fernandes, who was soon to be her husband. They settled in Coimbra, after Abilio moved there in August 1941 to take up the position of Museum Director at the University of Coimbra. In November 1947 Rosette was appointed Naturalist of that institution, and remained there for the rest of her career.

Rosette proceeded to reorganise and update the classification of herbarium material and published an index of seeds of the Botanical Garden. She went on numerous botanical collecting trips in Portugal, and arranged expeditions to Mozambique with her husband, where they made large collections of plants, greatly increasing the herbarium material of the Botanical Institute of Coimbra and the Center for Tropical Research.

Between 1944 and 1991, she attended 41 international congresses.

She also held seminars in Spain, France, UK, Sweden and Portugal, while between 1945 and 2000, she published some 250 papers, mainly in the field of plant systematics, but also in karyology, ethnobotany and the history of botany. From her considerable work in plant taxonomy, and numerous new combinations, she described more than fifty taxa new to science.

Rosette Batarda Fernandes is commemorated in several species, including Marsilea batardae Launer. Her papers on the karyology of Angiosperms were mostly published between 1945 and 1947 in collaboration with her husband Abilio Fernandes. Her contributions to Macaronesian flora were published mostly in the Bulletin of the Broterian Society and Broterian Iconographia Selecta Azoricae Florae. Noteworthy studies published between 1993 and 1997, were the Flora Ibérica (Vols. III, IV and V), which include taxonomic treatments of eight genera belonging to the Cruciferae, Crassulaceae, Cucurbitaceae and Malvaceae. She contributed to Flora Europaea, particularly noteworthy papers published in Volumes II (1968), III (1972) and IV (1976), covering the systematic study of 11 genera belonging to the Boraginaceae, Compositae, Labiatae, Malvaceae and Scrophulariaceae. As for African flora, she published 80 papers in journals between 1954 and 2000 — some were Conspectus Florae Angolensis, Garcia de Orta, Flora Zambeziaca and Flora of Mozambique.
