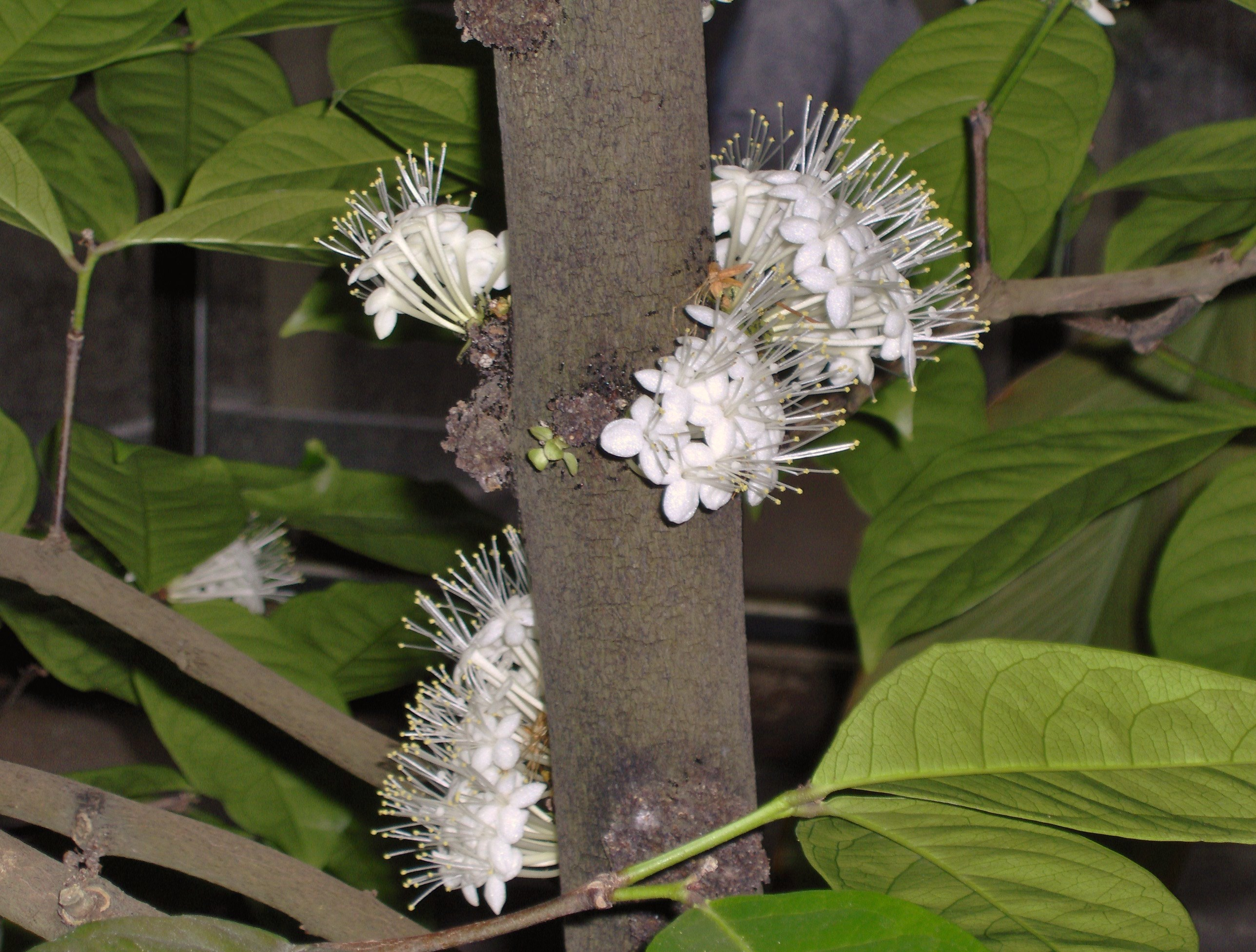
- Phaleria capitata

Scientific classification
- Kingdom: Plantae
- Clade: Tracheophytes
- Clade: Angiosperms
- Clade: Eudicots
- Clade: Rosids
- Order: Malvales
- Family: Thymelaeaceae
- Subfamily: Thymelaeoideae
- Genus: Phaleria; Jack

Synonyms
- Drimyspermum Reinw.; Leucosmia Benth.; Oreodendron C.T.White; Plutonia Noronha, nom. nud.; Pseudais Decne.

= Phaleria =

Genus of flowering plants

Phaleria is a flowering plant genus of about 25 species in the family Thymelaeaceae, which range from Sri Lanka to Malesia, Papuasia, northern and eastern Australia, and islands of the western Pacific.

== Uses ==
Phaleria macrocarpa is known to produce agarwood. Phaleria nisidai, locally known in Palau as delal a kar, 'the mother of medicines', is used as a panacea by Palauans.

== Species ==
As of April 2026, Plants of the World Online accepts the following 25 species:

- Phaleria acuminata (A. Gray) Gilg – Fiji, American Samoa, Tonga, Western Samoa
- Phaleria angustifolia A. C. Sm. – Fiji
- Phaleria biflora (C.T.White) Herber – Queensland
- Phaleria capitata Jack – Sri Lanka, Palau, Malaysia, Sumatra, Borneo, Java, Philippines, Sulawesi, Moluccas, New Guinea
- Phaleria chermsideana (F.M.Bailey) C.T.White – Queensland, New South Wales
- Phaleria clerodendron (F.Muell.) Benth. – Queensland
- Phaleria coccinea (Gaudich.) F.Muell. – New Guinea, New Britain, Moluccas, Philippines
- Phaleria disperma (G.Forst) Baill. – Fiji, Niue, Samoa, Tonga, Wallis and Futuna
- Phaleria elegans L.M.Perry – New Guinea endemic
- Phaleria glabra (Turrill) Domke – Fiji, Tonga
- Phaleria ixoroides Fosberg – Fiji
- Phaleria lanceolata (A. Gray) Gilg – Fiji
- Phaleria longituba P. F. Stevens – New Guinea
- Phaleria macrocarpa (Scheff.) Boerl. – New Guinea, Northern Territory
- Phaleria montana (Seem.) Gilg – Fiji
- Phaleria nisidae Kanehira – Palau, New Britain, New Guinea
- Phaleria octandra (L.) Baill. – New Guinea, Moluccas, Lesser Sunda Islands, Java, Northern Territory, Queensland
- Phaleria okapensis P. F. Stevens – New Guinea (Papua)
- Phaleria pentecostalis Leandri – Vanuatu
- Phaleria perrottetiana (Decne.) Fern.-Vill. – New Guinea, Moluccas, Borneo, Philippines
- Phaleria pilistyla P. F. Stevens – New Guinea (Papua)
- Phaleria pubiflora (A. Gray) Gilg – Fiji
- Phaleria pulchra Gillespie – Fiji
- Phaleria sogerensis S.Moore – New Guinea
- Phaleria stevensiana Z. S. Rogers – Sulawesi

== Taxonomy and phylogeny ==
Phylogenetic analysis shows that Phaleria's closest related genus is Dais, both of which are members of the Thymelaeoideae subfamily of the Thymelaeaceae family which contains 941 species in 48 different genera according to the Catalogue of Life. The next closest related genera is a clade containing Gnidia, Stephanodaphne, Dirca, Ovidia, Peddiea, Pimelea, Struthiola, Lachnaea, Passerina, and Passerina.
