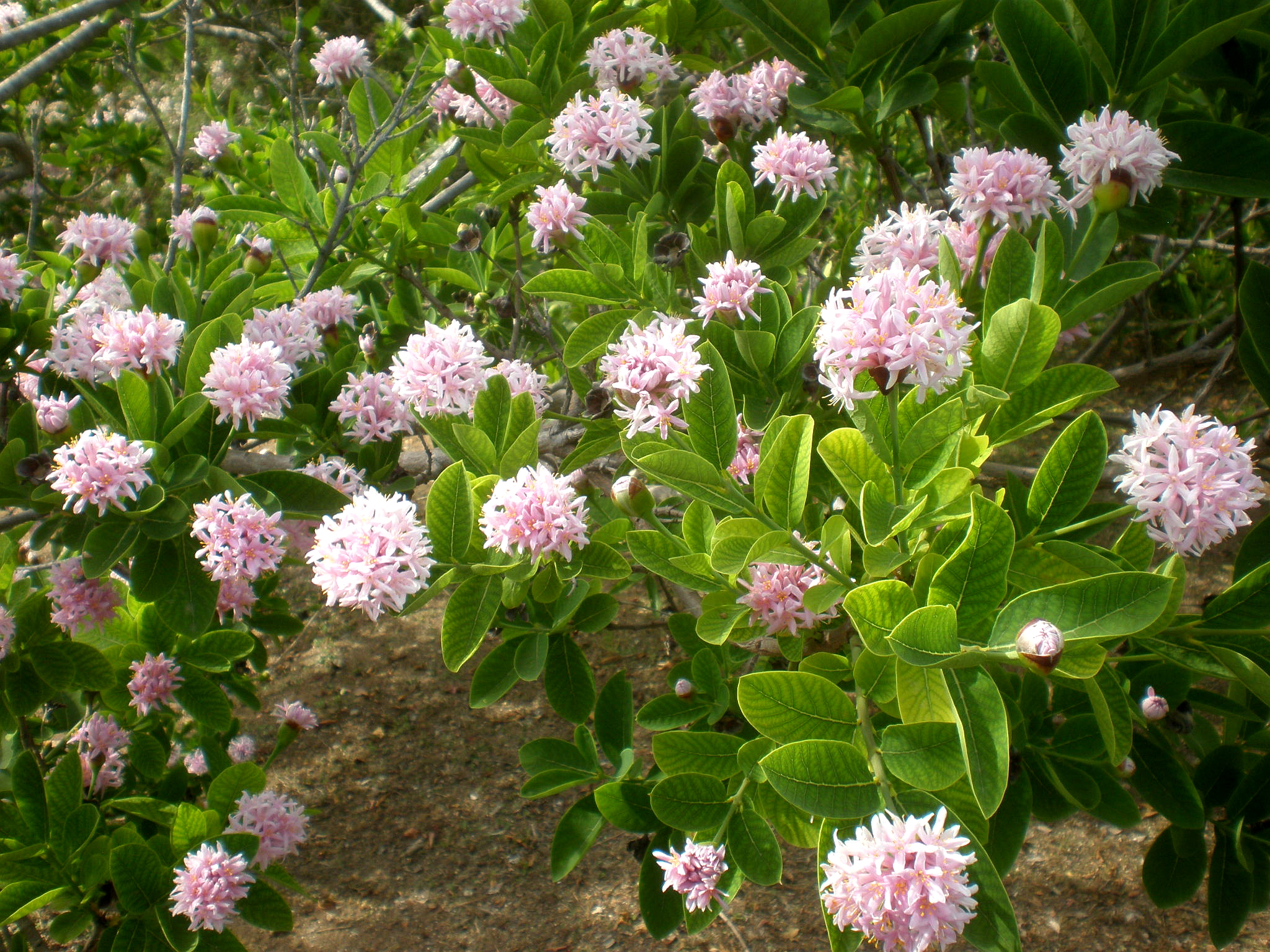
- Dais cotinifolia

Scientific classification
- Kingdom: Plantae
- Clade: Tracheophytes
- Clade: Angiosperms
- Clade: Eudicots
- Clade: Rosids
- Order: Malvales
- Family: Thymelaeaceae
- Subfamily: Thymelaeoideae
- Genus: Dais; Royen ex L.

Species
- 2, see text

= Dais (plant) =

Genus of flowering plants

Dais is a genus of flowering plants in the family Thymelaeaceae. It is also part of the Gnidia subfamily, along with Gnidia, Drapetes, Kelleria, Pimelea, Struthiola, Lachnaea and Passerina, other genera of species). It is distributed between Tanzania to S. Africa, Madagascar. It is native to the countries of Eswatini, Lesotho, Madagascar, Malawi, Tanzania, Zimbabwe and it is also found within several Provinces of South Africa, such as Cape Provinces, Free State, KwaZulu-Natal and Northern Provinces.

== General description ==
It has deciduous, many-branched shrubs or trees. The bush or tree can reach up to 10 ft. The branches are dark or greyish brown and glabrous (smooth). The leaves are often at the ends of the branches and are opposite or alternate (arranged along the stem). They are petiolate (have a stalk) and have a smooth blade. They have a slightly bluish tinge above and are light green beneath, with the midrib and pinnate lateral veins yellow beneath. The flowers have a dense, peduncle (have a flower stalk) and the terminal head, has involucral bracts (a structure surrounding or supporting, usually a head of flowers) is rigid and persistent. The involucre is four-leaved, It has a spherical head of flowers. It has a cylindric calyx-tube, which is often slightly curved, and is circumscissile (opens at the top) above the ovary. It has 5 (rarely 4) lobes, with the outer lobes slightly larger than the inner. It has no petals, but 10 stamen. It has a single chambered ovary, with one seed or fruit.

== Taxonomy ==
First published in Sp. Pl. ed. 2 on page 556 in 1762, by Adriaan van Royen, based on an earlier description by Carl Linnaeus.

The genus name is derived from 'Dais' which means a 'torch' in Greek, and it refers to the resemblance of the stalk and bracts holding the flowers to a torch about to be lit.

The type specimen is Dais cotinifolia L.

In 1807, was originally placed within Vipreculae family, (which all had an involucre which was 4 leaved, many flowered, no perianth, one petalled, funnel-formed, tube filiform, and border 5 cleft. There were 3 known species; Dais cotinifolia, Dais ocranda and Dais difperma.

Thomas Moore notes that there was 7 species in the genus in 1874.

It was verified by United States Department of Agriculture and the Agricultural Research Service on 17 September 1996.

== Species ==
2 accepted species are known;(according to Kew)

- Dais cotinifolia L. 'African button flower' (from South Africa, Eswatini, Tanzania, Zimbabwe)
- Dais glaucescens Decne (from Madagascar) (has synonyms Dais madagascariensis Bojer ex Meisn., Dais rhamnifolia Baill. and Lasiosiphon rhamnifolius Baker)

The US-based GRIN only accepts Dais cotinifolia L.

== Uses ==
Both species are used as ornamentals within gardens, grown for their flowers and the overall appearance.

== Cultivation ==
Within the garden setting, the plants are frost tender, require full sun and well drained soils. It is recommended to water containerized plants well when in growth and less when leafless. It is possible to propagate the plants, by seed in spring or by semi-ripe cuttings in summer.

== Other sources ==
- Bredenkamp, C. L. & J. B. P. Beyers. 2003. Thymelaeaceae in Plants of Southern Africa: an annotated checklist. Strelitzia 14: 928–935.
- Peterson, B. 2006. Thymelaeaceae. Fl. Zambes. 9(3): 85–117.
- Peterson, B. 1978. Thymelaeaceae. 1–37. In W. B. Turrill & R. M. Polhill (ed.) Fl. Trop. E. Africa. A. A. Balkema, Rotterdam.
