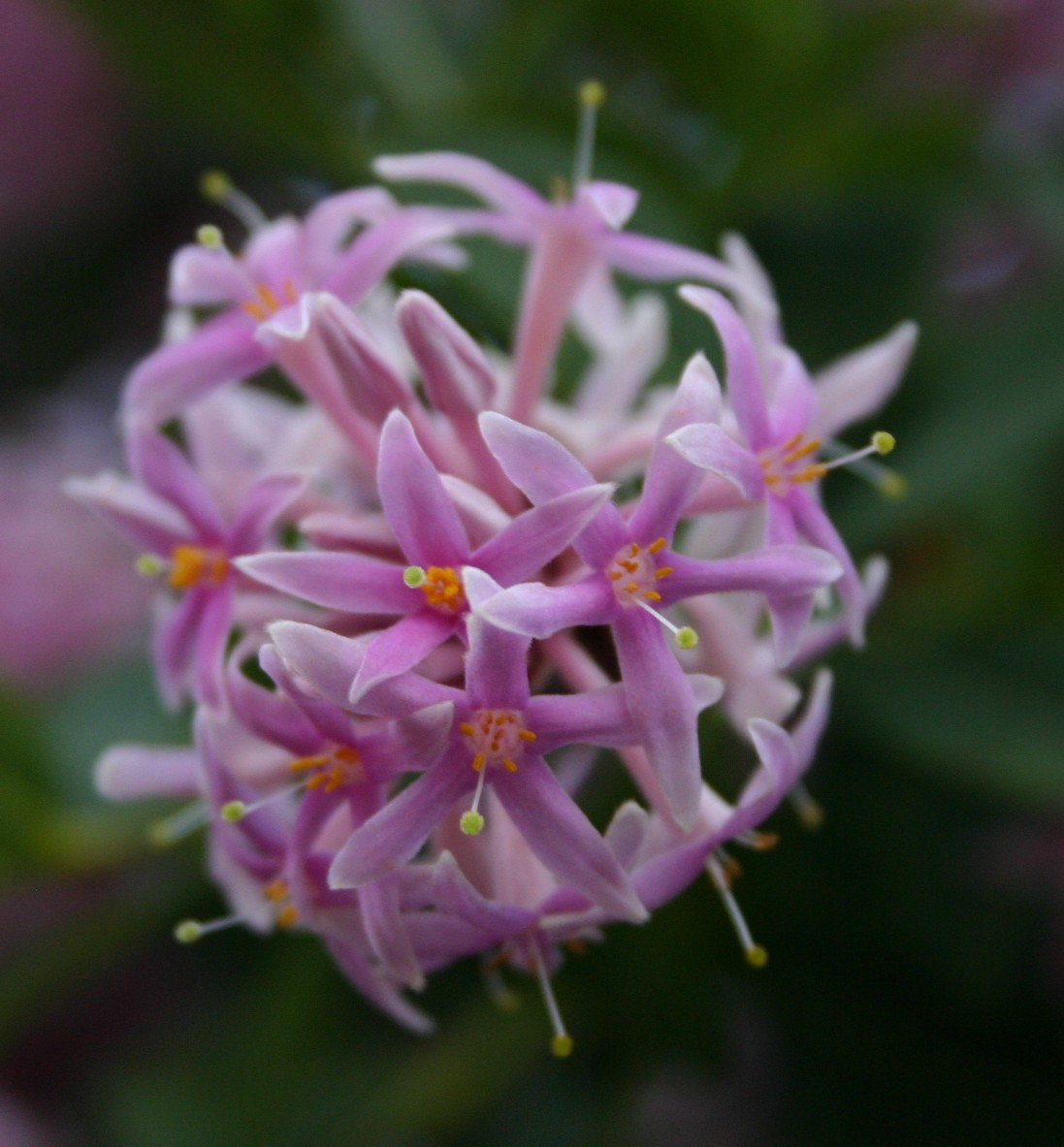

Scientific classification
- Kingdom: Plantae
- Clade: Tracheophytes
- Clade: Angiosperms
- Clade: Eudicots
- Clade: Rosids
- Order: Malvales
- Family: Thymelaeaceae
- Genus: Dais
- Species: D. cotinifolia

Binomial name
- Dais cotinifolia L.

Synonyms
- Dais canescens Bartl. ex Meisn.; Dais eriocephala Licht. ex Meisn.; Dais laurifolia Jacq.; Dais passerina J.C.Wendl. ex Meisn.; Lasiosiphon grandifolius Gilli

= Dais cotinifolia =

Species of small Southern African tree

Dais cotinifolia, known as the pompom tree, is a small Southern African tree belonging to the Thymelaeaceae family. It occurs along the east coast northwards from the Eastern Cape, inland along the Drakensberg escarpment through KwaZulu-Natal and the Transvaal, with an isolated population in the Eastern Highlands of Zimbabwe. It flowers profusely during the summer months and produces a multitude of pink, sweet-scented, globular flowerheads about 8 cm across.

== Description ==
Dias cotinifolia is a small tree of up to 6m in height, with a rounded, leafy crown. In cultivation, its height and span only reach 2-3m in the UK and can reach up to 4 metres in Australia. It has small ovate-oblong shaped and lustrous leaves up to 5cm long. It is evergreen in mild climates and deciduous in cool climates. In spring, or in the summer, it bears scented star-shaped rose-lilac, or pink coloured flowers, in round clusters 8 cm across. The bark is tough and fibrous and the branchlets are difficult to break.

== Uses ==
Used as an ornamental in gardens, can be grown as a small tree or multi-stemmed shrub. It prefers full sun and in fertile and well drained soils.

Its bark yields fibres that are strong enough to be used as thread.

== See also ==
- List of Southern African indigenous trees
