= Struthiola tetralepis =

Scientific classification
- Kingdom: Plantae
- Clade: Embryophytes
- Clade: Tracheophytes
- Clade: Angiosperms
- Clade: Eudicots
- Clade: Rosids
- Order: Malvales
- Family: Thymelaeaceae
- Genus: Struthiola
- Species: S. tetralepis

Binomial name
- Struthiola tetralepis Schltr.

Synonyms
- S. tetralepis var. glabricaulis

Species of plant native to South Africa

Struthiola tetralepis is a willowy shrublet of up to 30 cm (0.98 ft) high that is assigned to the family Thymelaeaceae. It has long straight branches that are initially hairy and are covered in leaves pressed against them. These leaves are small, overlapping, lance-shaped, sharply pointed, have a regular row of hairs along the margins, and 3-5 veins are visible on the outward facing surface. It has initially greenish yellow, later reddish brown flowers, each of which consists of a tube of about 1 cm (0.39 in) long with 4 lance-shaped, pointed sepal lobes and 4 yellow alternating petal-like scales. It flowers between October and February. It can be found in the southwest of the Western Cape province of South Africa. It is sometimes called cross capespray in English.

== Taxonomy ==
This species was first described as Struthiola tetralepis by Rudolf Schlechter in 1900, based on a plant he collected himself at Franschhoek. He distinguished two varieties, S. tetralepis var. tetralepis and S. tetralepis var. glabricaulis. Charles Henry Wright in 1915 considered the varieties insufficiently characterised and regarded S. tetralepis var. glabricaulis a synonym of S. tetralepis.

== Description ==
Struthiola tetralepis is a willowy, single-stemmed shrublet of up to 30 cm (0.98 ft) high with branches that initially have a layer of soft hairs pressed to their surface, but the hairs are lost with age. The leaves are in pairs opposing each other, initially pressed against the branches, but less so further down, overlapping each other, with the blade directly attached to the branche without a leaf stalk. They are lance-shaped, generally 8–10 mm (0.31–0.39 in) long and 1–2 mm (0.039–0.079 in) wide, somewhat depressed along the main vein, increasingly pointed towards the tip, with a row of hairs pressed to the surface along its rim when young, with 3 to 5 stripes visible along the length of the outward facing surface.

The flowers are seated in the axils of the leaves over a considerable length towards the tip of the branches, an inflorescence type called a spike. The two bracteoles are set opposite each other at the base of the flower, awl-shaped, about 4 mm (0.16 in) long, with a regular row of hairs along the margin and a blunt tip ending in a tuft of hairs.

The calyx is initially greenish yellow, later fading to brownish red, with at its base a cylindrical tube of about 7 mm (0.28 in) long that is covered on the outside with soft hairs pressed against its surface and at its top 4 lance-shaped, protracted, pointed lobes of 2–3 mm (0.079–0.118 in) long and 0.5–1.0 mm (0.020–0.039 in) wide, hairless but the outer 2 with a tuft of hairs at the tips. Four yellow, fleshy, petal-like scales are implanted above and alternating with the sepal lobes, and are surrounded by stiff hairs longer than the scales. About 1 mm (0.039 in) below the mouth of the tube sits on whorl of four seated stamens, that have a whitish wart at their tips. The ovary is egg-shaped, hairless and about 1.5 mm long, and is topped by a style of about 5 mm (0.20 in) long and ends in a brush-like stigma.

=== Differences with related species ===
Struthiola has its flowers arranged in long spikes and every flower contains 4 anthers, whereas Gnidia differs from it in having its flowers in short spikes, solitary or more often in heads and anthers in 2 whorls of 4 or 5 each. Both Lachnaea, Passerina and a few Gnidia-species lack scales on the calyx tubes. Both S. striata and S. tetralepis have four petal-like scales implanted at the opening of the calyx tube, while the many dozens of remaining Struthiola species have eight or twelve scales. S. striata is a roundish shrub of up to 1.5 m high with cream, soft yellow or pinkish flowers ending in oval sepal lobes of 1–2 mm long and 1.5–2.5 mm wide, and a reddish wart on the tip of the anthers, S. tetralepis is a single stemmed shrublet of up to 30 cm (0.98 ft) high that has initially greenish yellow, later brownish red flowers with lance-shaped sepal lobes of 2–3 mm (0.079–0.118 in) long and 0.5–1.0 mm (0.020–0.039 in) wide, and a white wart on the anthers.

== Distribution, ecology and conservation ==
Struthiola tetralepis is only known to grow on shale bands in the Hottentots Holland Mountains between Villiersdorp and Franschhoek in a vegetation type known as Cape Wineland Shale Fynbos. The continued survival of this species is considered to be of least concern because its populations are stable.
