= Dais glaucescens =

Conservation status
- Least Concern (IUCN 3.1)

Scientific classification
- Kingdom: Plantae
- Clade: Tracheophytes
- Clade: Angiosperms
- Clade: Eudicots
- Clade: Rosids
- Order: Malvales
- Family: Thymelaeaceae
- Genus: Dais
- Species: D. glaucescens

Binomial name
- Dais glaucescens Decne.

Synonyms
- Dais madagascariensis Bojer ex Meisn.; Dais rhamnifolia Baill.; Lasiosiphon rhamnifolius Baker

Species of flowering plant

Dais glaucescens, commonly called havohoa in Malagasy, is a species of flowering plant in the family Thymelaeaceae that is native to central Madagascar. It was originally described by Joseph Decaisne in the Annales des Sciences Naturelles in 1843.

== Description ==
Dais glaucescens takes the form of a shrub or small tree, growing up to 8 metres (8.7 yd) tall. The trunk can be up to 25 centimetres (9.8 in) in diameter.

== Distribution and habitat ==
Dais glaucescens is native to the central areas of Madagascar. It is found in forests, usually near water, at elevations of roughly 1,000 metres (1,100 yd).

== Uses ==
In Madagascar, the bark of Dais glaucescens is known as "havoa" and is used in the making of Antemoro paper. This practice of using the "beaten-bark technique" has been attributed to the Antemoro people as far back as 1661 by the French governor of Madagascar Étienne de Flacourt.
