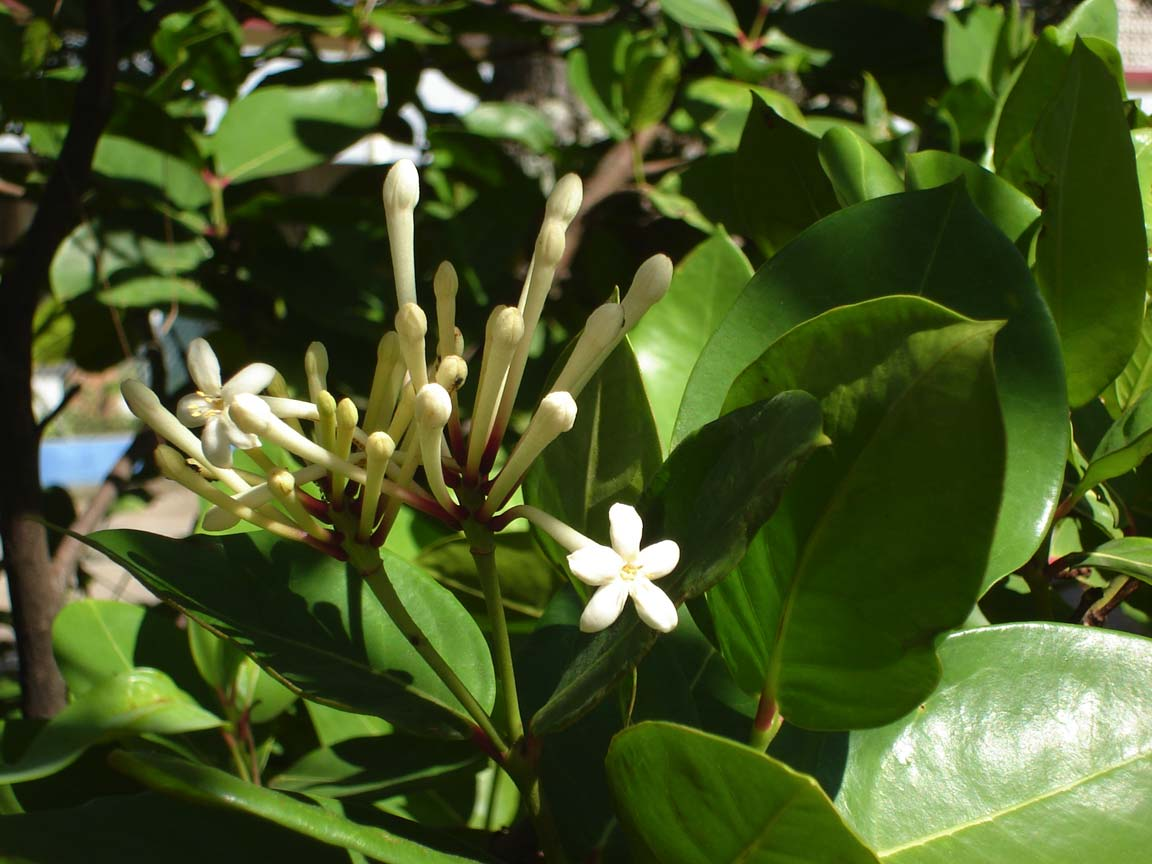
- In Tonga

Scientific classification
- Kingdom: Plantae
- Clade: Embryophytes
- Clade: Tracheophytes
- Clade: Angiosperms
- Clade: Eudicots
- Clade: Rosids
- Order: Malvales
- Family: Thymelaeaceae
- Genus: Phaleria
- Species: P. disperma

Binomial name
- Phaleria disperma (G.Forst.) Baill.

Synonyms
- Dais disperma G.Forst. Drimyspermum billardieri Decne. Drimyspermum burnettianum (Benth.) Seem. Drimyspermum forsteri Meisn. Leucosmia burnettiana Benth. Leucosmia ovata Decne. Phaleria burnettiana (Benth.) P.Knuth

= Phaleria disperma =

Species of flowering plant

Phaleria disperma is an ornamental flowering evergreen plant native to the southwestern Pacific, where it is found in Fiji, Niue, Samoa, Tonga, and Wallis and Futuna.
