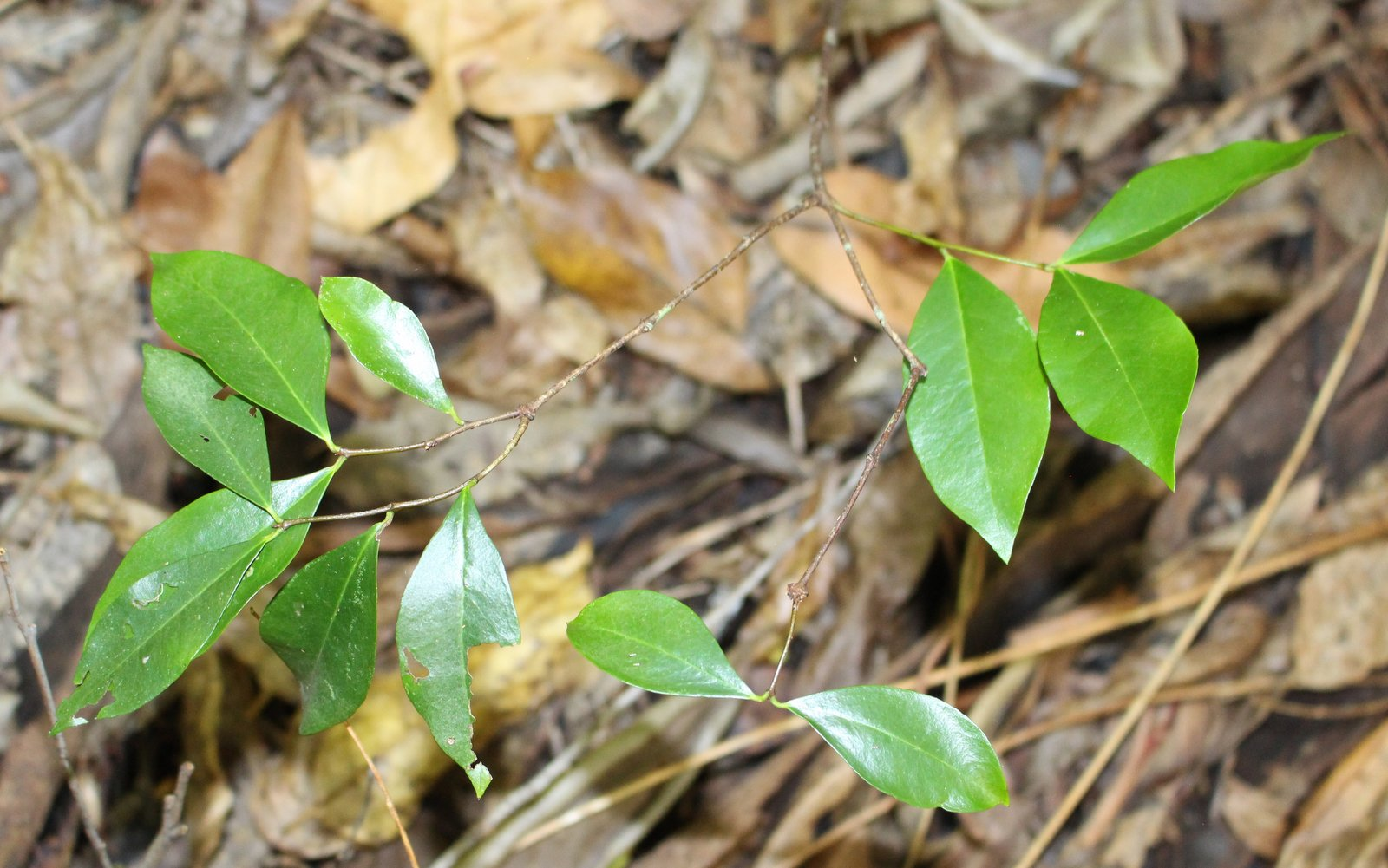

Scientific classification
- Kingdom: Plantae
- Clade: Tracheophytes
- Clade: Angiosperms
- Clade: Eudicots
- Clade: Rosids
- Order: Malvales
- Family: Thymelaeaceae
- Genus: Phaleria
- Species: P. chermsideana

Binomial name
- Phaleria chermsideana (F.M.Bailey) C.T.White

Synonyms
- Leucosmia chermsideana F.M.Bailey

= Phaleria chermsideana =

scrub daphne

Species of shrub

Phaleria chermsideana known as the scrub daphne grows as a shrub or small tree. Usually seen on the margins of rainforest in eastern Australia, north from Dorrigo, New South Wales to tropical Queensland.
