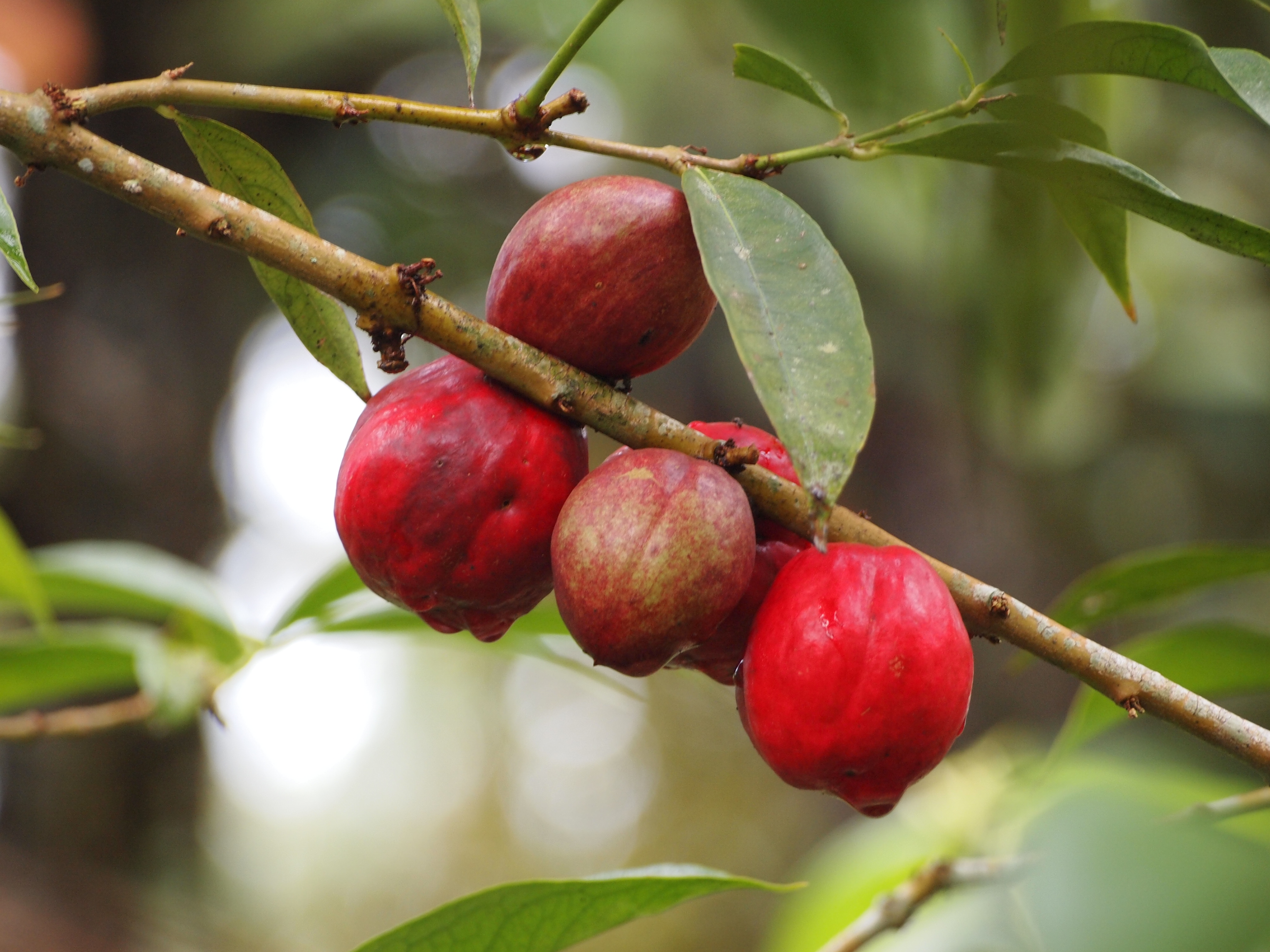
- Ripe Phaleria macrocarpa

Scientific classification
- Kingdom: Plantae
- Clade: Tracheophytes
- Clade: Angiosperms
- Clade: Eudicots
- Clade: Rosids
- Order: Malvales
- Family: Thymelaeaceae
- Genus: Phaleria
- Species: P. macrocarpa

Binomial name
- Phaleria macrocarpa (Scheff.) Boerl.

Synonyms
- Drimyspermum macrocarpum Scheff. Phaleria calantha Gilg; Phaleria papuana Warb. ex K.Schum. & Lauterb. Phaleria wichmannii Valeton

= Phaleria macrocarpa =

Species of flowering plant

Phaleria macrocarpa is a species of flowering plant in the family Thymelaeaceae. It is commonly called buah mahkota dewa, God's crown, pau and is a dense evergreen tree, indigenous to Indonesia. It is found in tropical areas of New Guinea up to 1,200 m (3,900 ft) above sea level.

== Botany ==
The height of P. macrocarpa ranges from 1–18 m (3 ft 3 in – 59 ft 1 in) with greenish bark and white wood. It has green, tapered leaves. The flowers are made up to two to four petals, and range from green to maroon in color. It grows 10–1,200 m (33–3,900 ft) above sea level with a productive age that ranges from 10 to 20 years. The leaves are green and tapering with length and width ranging from 7–10 cm (2.8–3.9 in) and 3–5 cm (1.2–2.0 in), respectively. The flowers make a compound of two to four, with color from green to maroon. Eclipse-shaped fruits are green when unripe, and have a diameter of 3 cm (1.2 in). They are red when ripe. The white, round pits are poisonous and fruit is of eclipse shape with a diameter of 3 cm (1.2 in). Each fruit has one to two brown, ovoid, and anatropous seeds per fruit. The extract of the plant has been evaluated for potential pharmacological uses.

An extract from the leaves of the plant Phaleria macrocarpa has been shown to have potent anti-inflammatory effects. A study on the molecular anti-inflammatory mechanisms of the plant's leaf ethanol extract found that it significantly reduced nitric oxide (NO) production and suppressed the expression of inducible nitric oxide synthase (iNOS) and interleukin-1β (IL-1β) in a dose-dependent manner. In addition, computational studies found strong interactions between compounds from the extract and several inflammation-related targets, including AKT1, MMP9, PI3KCA, PI3KCG, and PTGS2. The results of the study suggest that P. macrocarpa leaf extract may have therapeutic potential for treating inflammatory conditions.

== Images ==
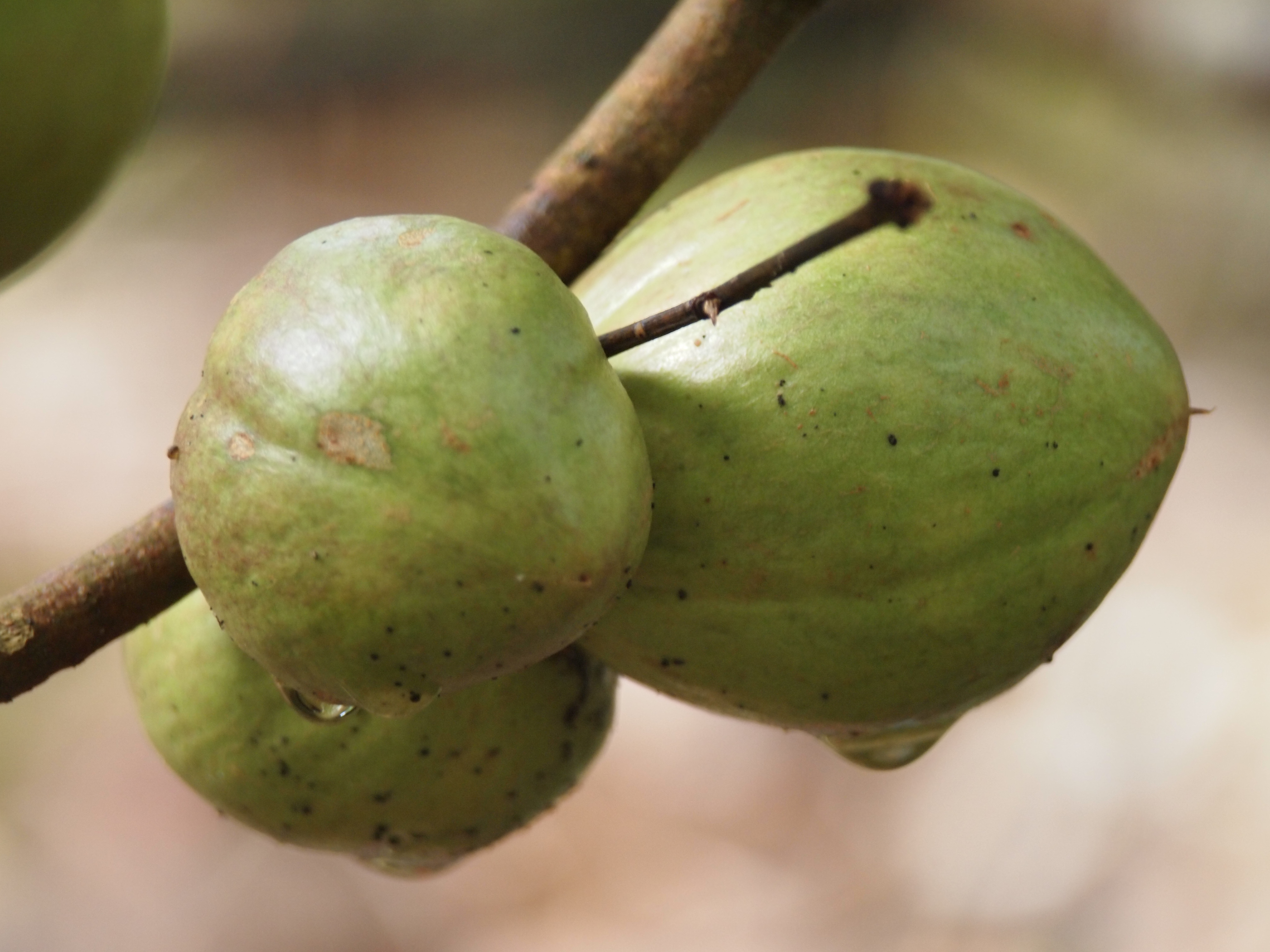
Young fruit of Phaleria macrocarpa in Malaysia

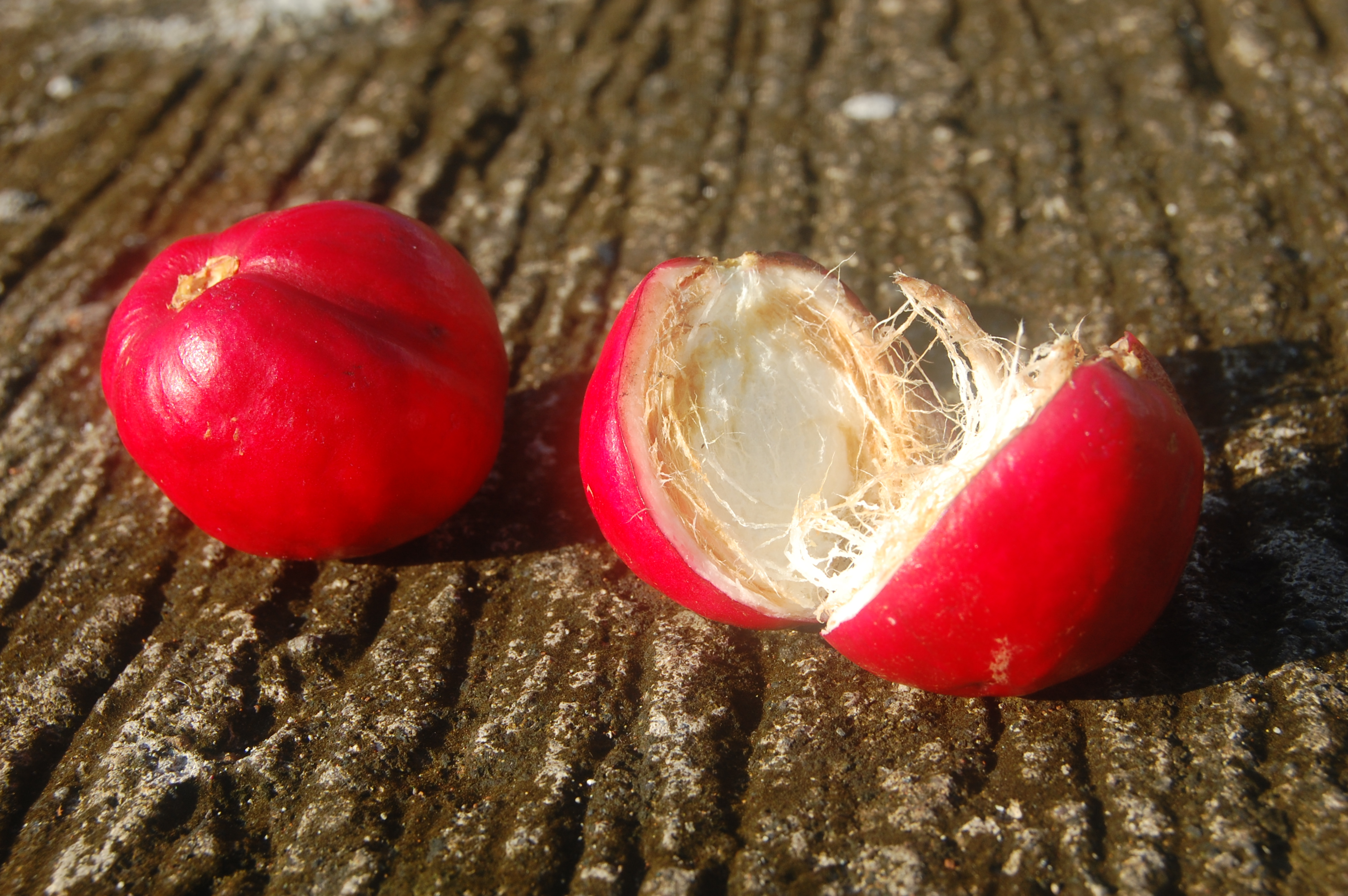
The split fruit

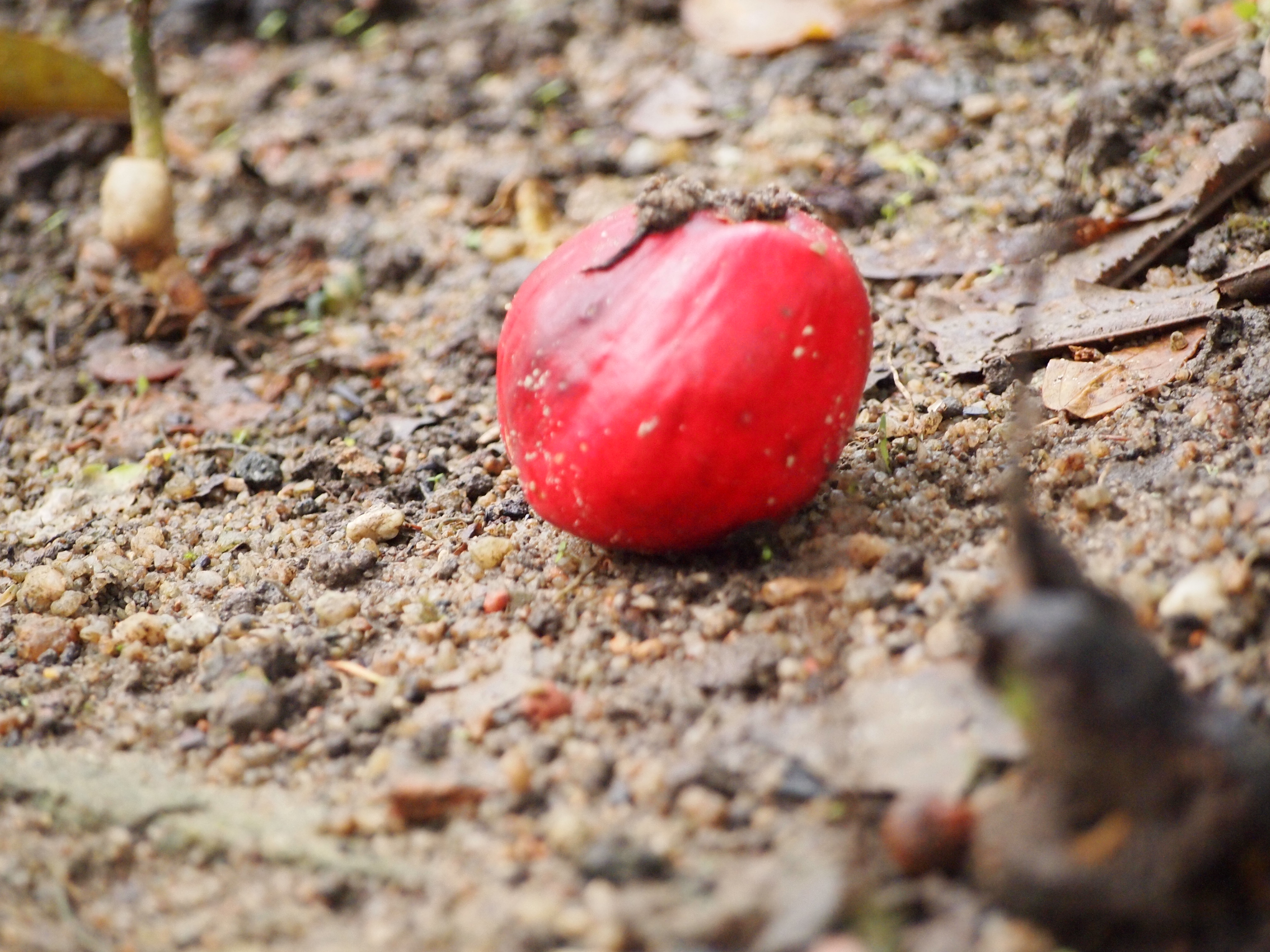
Ripened fruit falls to ground.

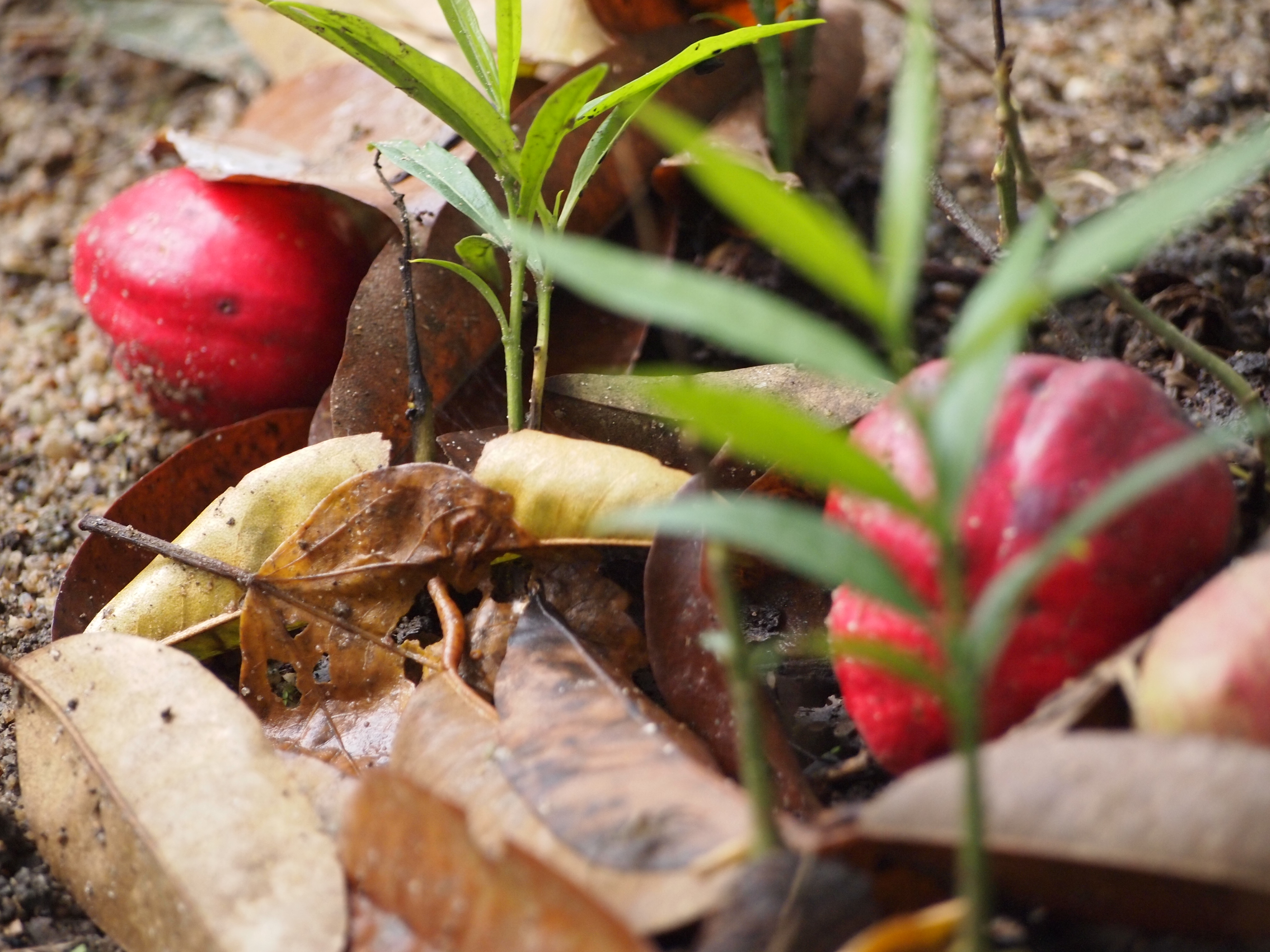
Seedlings of Phaleria macrocarpa growing under the parent tree
