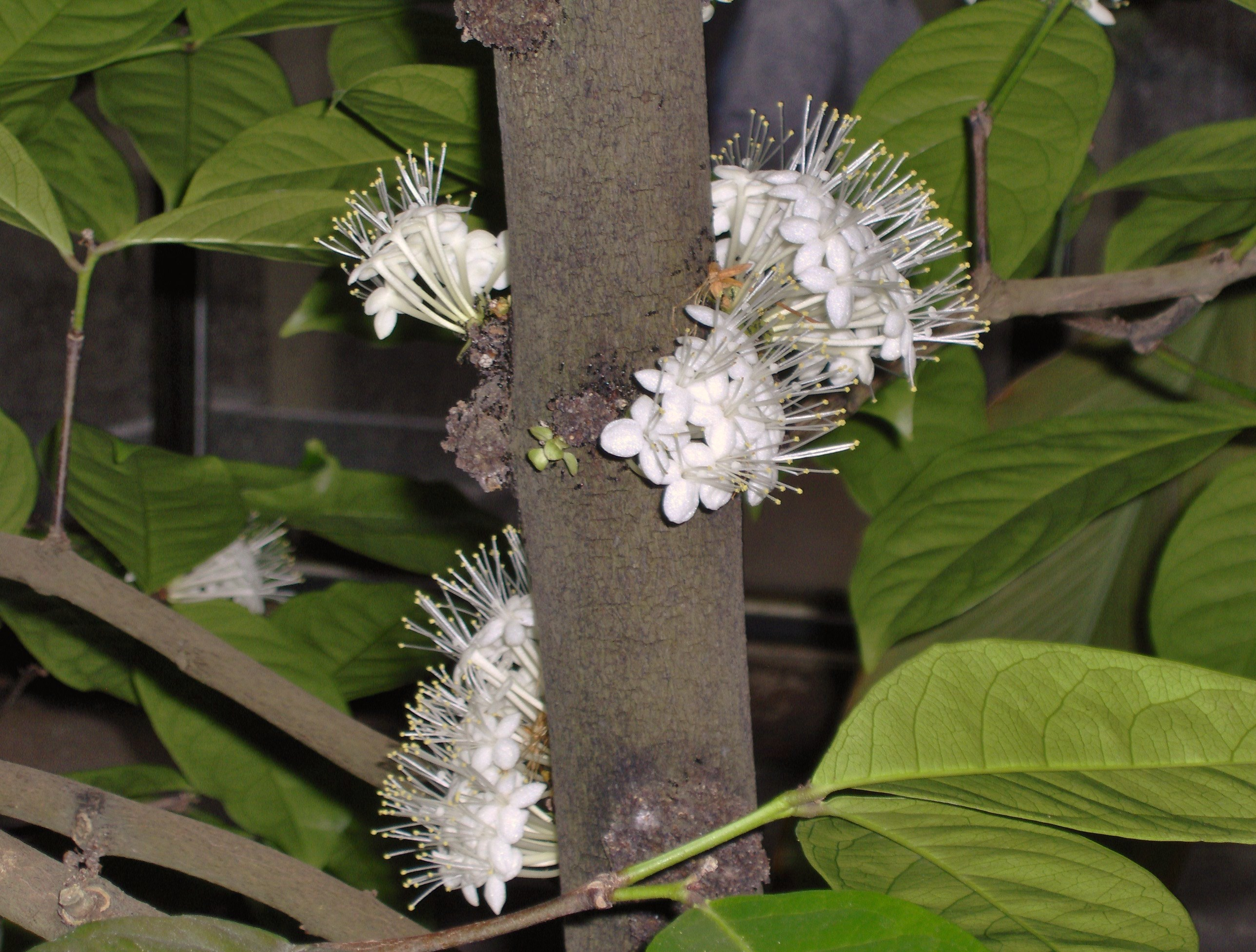

Conservation status
- Least Concern (IUCN 3.1)

Scientific classification
- Kingdom: Plantae
- Clade: Tracheophytes
- Clade: Angiosperms
- Clade: Eudicots
- Clade: Rosids
- Order: Malvales
- Family: Thymelaeaceae
- Genus: Phaleria
- Species: P. capitata

Binomial name
- Phaleria capitata Jack

Synonyms
- Dais dubiosa Blume; Drimyspermum blumei Decne.; Drimyspermum cauliflorum Thwaites; Drimyspermum cumingianum Decne.; Drimyspermum cumingii Meisn.; Drimyspermum phaleria Meisn.; Drimyspermum urens Reinw.; Phaleria blumei (Decne.) Benth.; Phaleria cauliflora (Thwaites) Bedd.; Phaleria cumingii (Meisn.) Fern.-Vill.; Phaleria dubiosa (Blume) Zoll.; Phaleria urens (Reinw.) Koord.

= Phaleria capitata =

Species of shrub

Phaleria capitata is a species of flowering plant in the family Thymelaeaceae. It grows as a shrub or small tree up to 10 metres (30 ft) tall, with a stem diameter of up to 15 centimetres (6 in). Twigs are reddish brown. Inflorescences usually bear five flowers. The fruits are roundish, up to 1.5 cm (1 in) long. Habitat is forest from sea-level to 1,200 metres (3,900 ft) altitude. P. capitata grows naturally in Sri Lanka, Peninsular Malaysia, Sumatra, Borneo, Sulawesi, Maluku, the Philippines, New Guinea, the Caroline Islands and Tonga.

It is a shade tolerant, tropical species. Common/English names include Ongael, Phaleria Jack.
