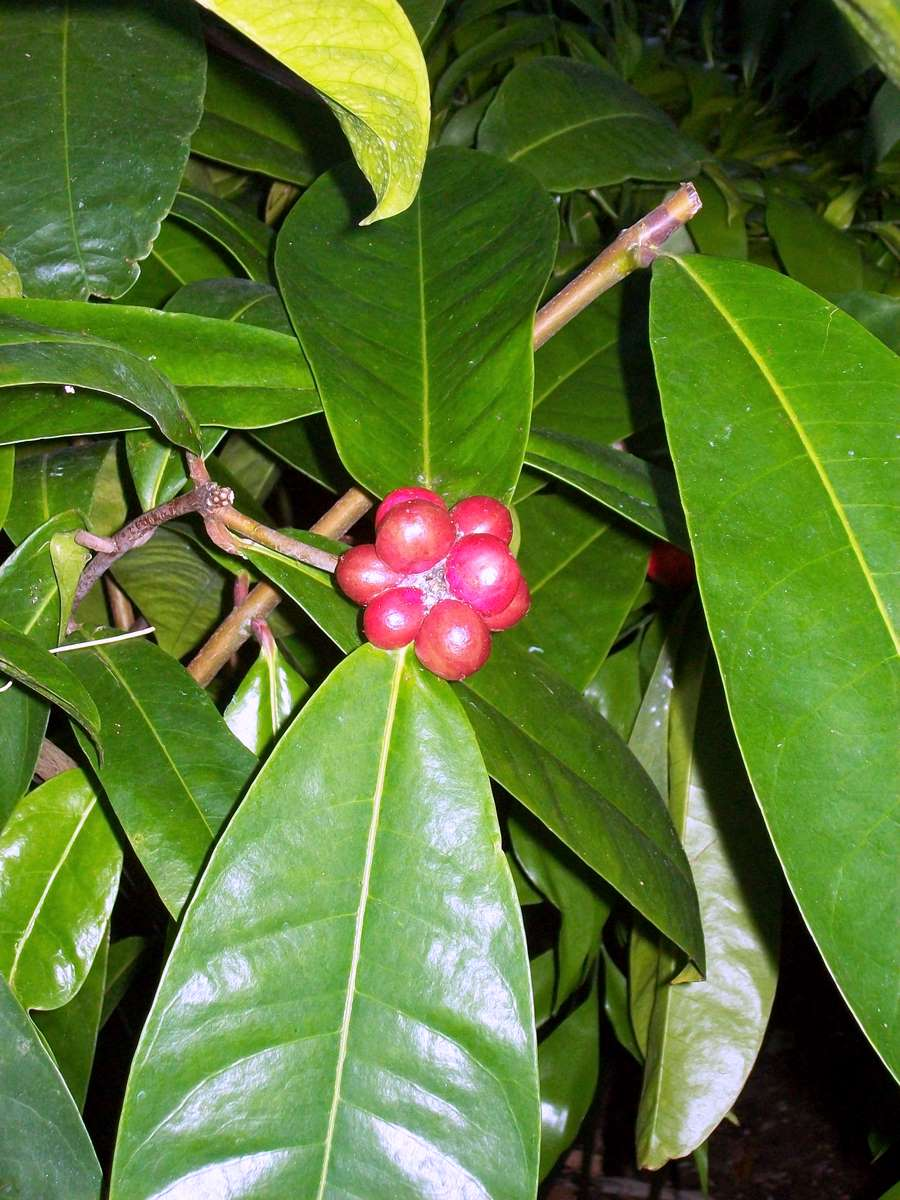
- Leaves & fruit - Royal Botanic Gardens, Sydney

Conservation status
- Least Concern (IUCN 3.1)

Scientific classification
- Kingdom: Plantae
- Clade: Tracheophytes
- Clade: Angiosperms
- Clade: Eudicots
- Clade: Rosids
- Order: Malvales
- Family: Thymelaeaceae
- Genus: Phaleria
- Species: P. octandra

Binomial name
- Phaleria octandra (L.) Baill.

Synonyms
- 18 synonyms: Dais octandra L.; Dais dubiosa Decne.; Dais longifolia Zipp. ex Span.; Drimyspermum ambiguum Meisn.; Drimyspermum burmanni Decne.; Drimyspermum laurifolium Zoll.; Drimyspermum laurifolium Decne.; Drimyspermum longifolium Miq.; Drimyspermum neumannii F.Muell.; Phaleria ambigua (Meisn.) Boerl.; Phaleria blumei var. latifolia Benth.; Phaleria laurifolia Hook.f.; Phaleria laurifolia var. javanica Valeton; Phaleria longifolia Boerl.; Phaleria neumannii (F.Muell.) Benth.; Phaleria octandra var. laurifolia Warb. ex Malm; Phaleria parvifolia Backer; Phaleria pedunculata C.T.White

= Phaleria octandra =

White daphne

Species of flowering plants

Phaleria octandra, commonly known as dwarf Phaleria, is a species of plant in the family Thymelaeaceae, native to Indonesia, New Guinea and northern Australia. It is a rainforest shrub that was first described by Carl Linnaeus in 1767, and it has the conservation status of least concern.

== Description ==
This is a shrub growing to about 2 or 3 m (6 ft 7 in or 9 ft 10 in) tall. It has elliptic leaves measuring up to 20 cm (7.9 in) long and 7 cm (2.8 in) wide, which are arranged in opposite pairs on the twigs. White scented flowers appear from November to February, followed in March and April by globular, shiny red fruit about 1.5 cm (0.59 in) long.

== Distribution and habitat ==
The westerly limit of Phaleria octandra's native range is the Indonesian island of Java, then eastward through the Lesser Sunda Islands, Maluku Islands, New Guinea and the Solomon Islands, and south into the Northern Territory and Queensland in Australia. It is found as far south as Sarina, Queensland.

It inhabits mature rainforest on a variety of soils. In Australia it occurs up to about 800 m (2,600 ft) in altitude.

== Taxonomy ==
The species was first described in 1767 by Carl Linnaeus, who gave it the name Dais octandra. French botanist Henri Ernest Baillon transferred it to its current position in the genus Phaleria in 1873.

== Conservation ==
This species was assessed by the International Union for Conservation of Nature (IUCN) in 2018 and found to be of least-concern. In its statement, the IUCN cites the lack of any perceived threat to the species, as well as a wide distribution and large population, as the basis for the assessment. It is also rated as least-concern by the Queensland Government under its Nature Conservation Act.

== Cultivation ==
Dwarf Phaleria is considered to be an attractive plant for cultivation, due to the dense clusters of showy flowers. It needs shade, aerated soil and plenty of moisture.

== Gallery ==
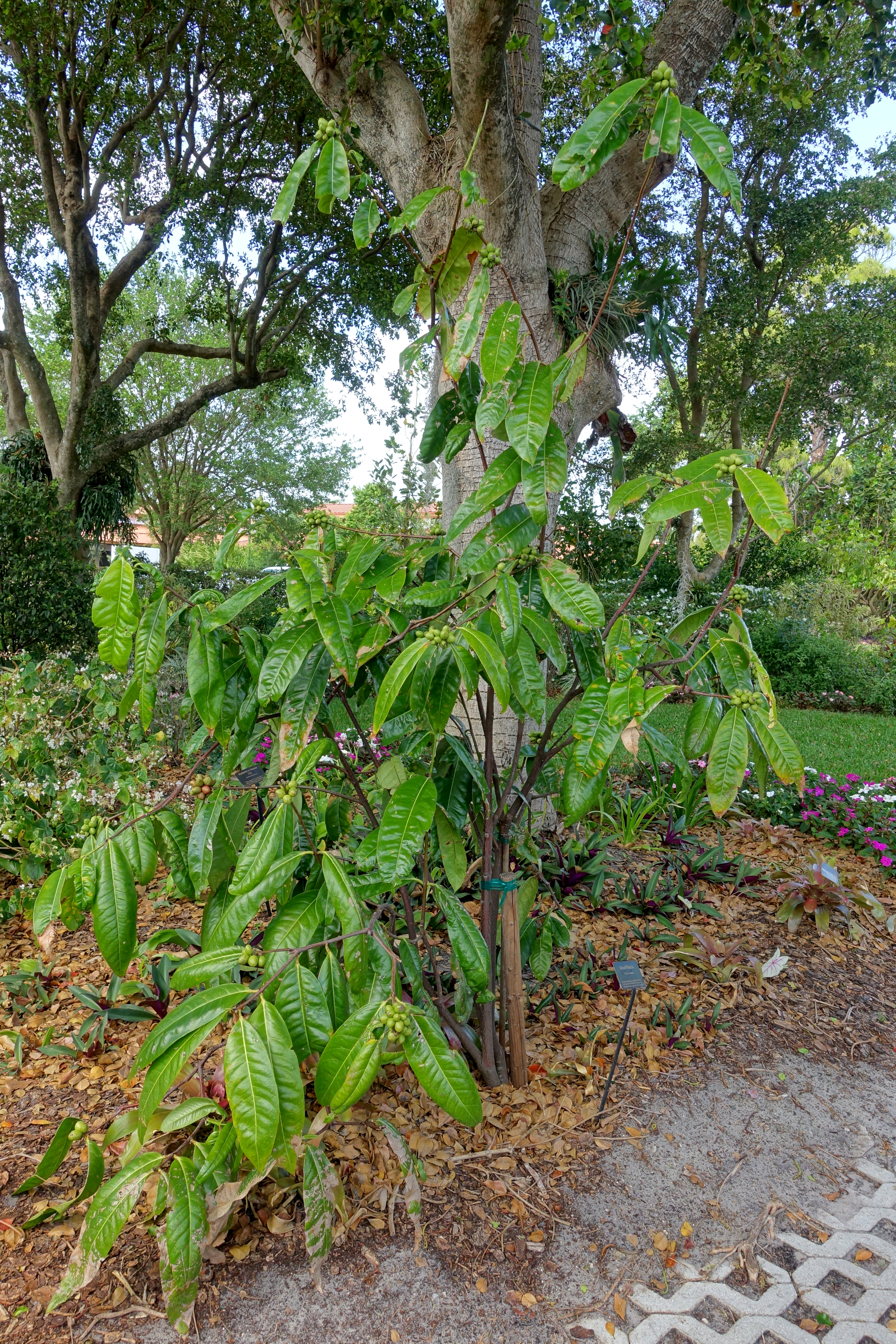
Habit

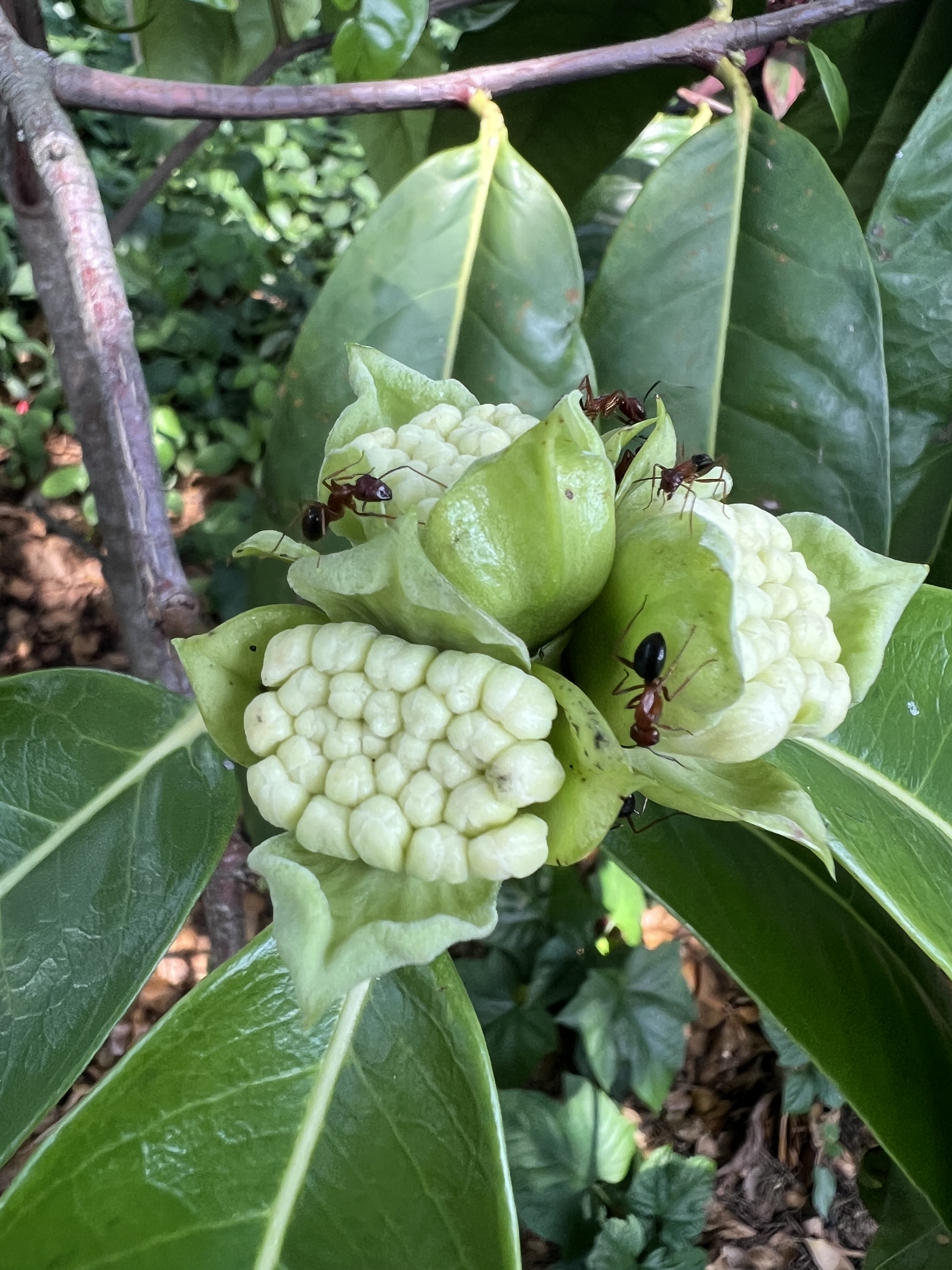
Flower buds

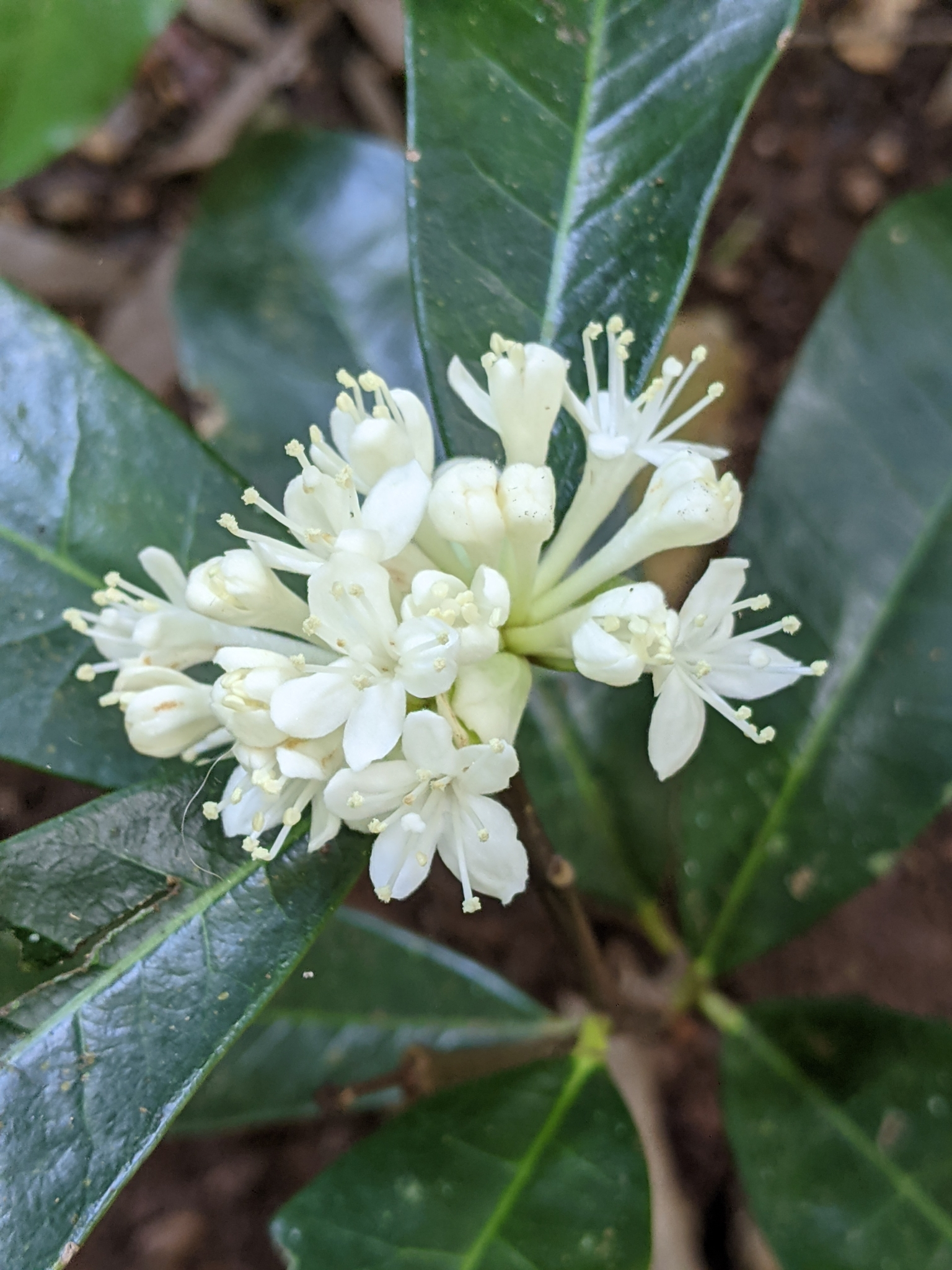
Flowers

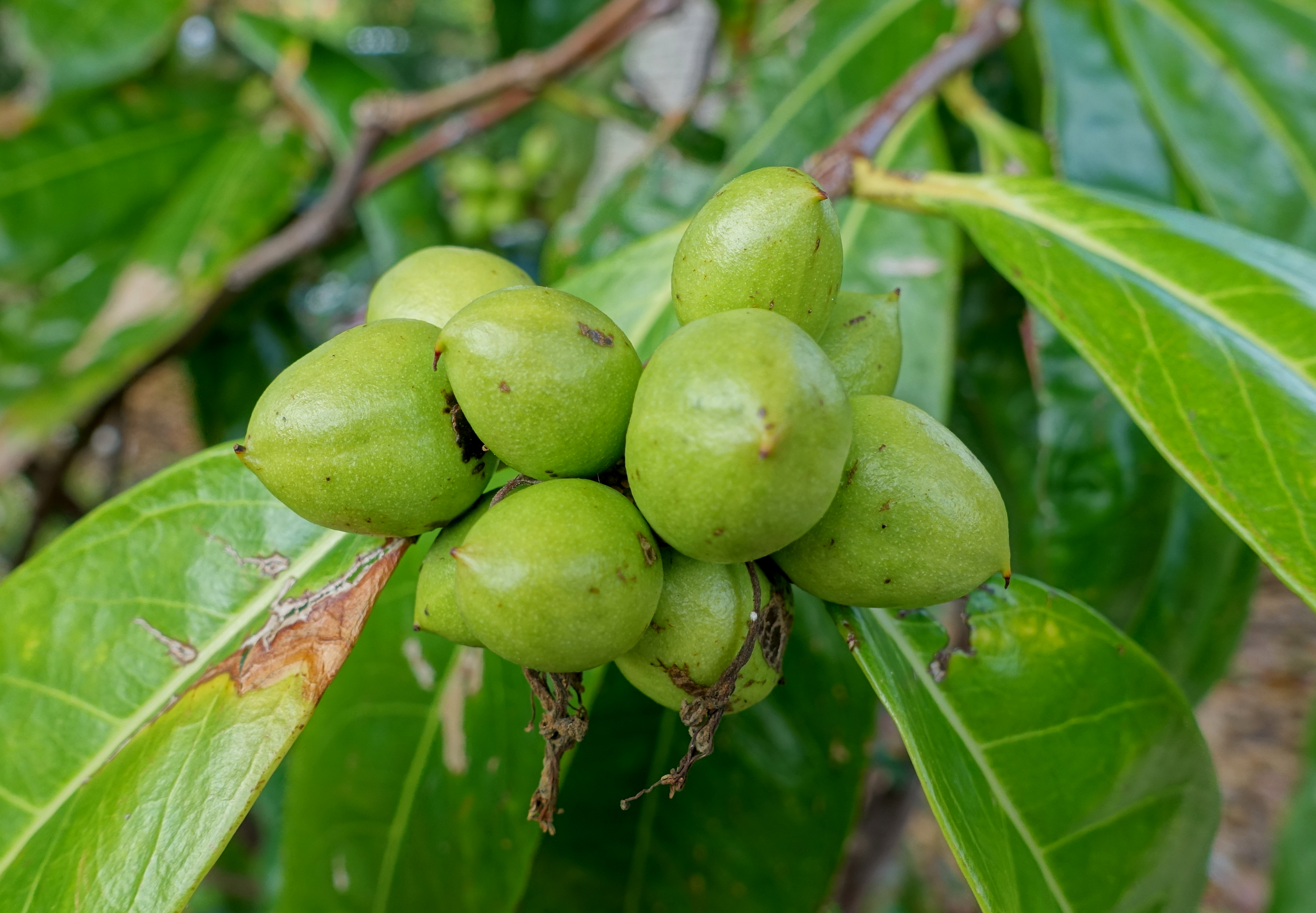
Immature fruit
