= Lasiosiphon socotranus =

Conservation status
- Least Concern (IUCN 3.1)

Scientific classification
- Kingdom: Plantae
- Clade: Tracheophytes
- Clade: Angiosperms
- Clade: Eudicots
- Clade: Rosids
- Order: Malvales
- Family: Thymelaeaceae
- Genus: Lasiosiphon
- Species: L. socotranus

Binomial name
- Lasiosiphon socotranus Balf.f. (1883)

Synonyms
- Gnidia socotrana (Balf.f.) Gilg (1894)

Species of flowering plant

Lasiosiphon socotranus is a species of plant in the Thymelaeaceae family. It is a shrub endemic to the island of Socotra in Yemen. It is abundant in semi-deciduous woodland and shrubland on the island's western limestone plateaus and at the summit of the eastern limestone escarpment, and dominant in woodland in the northern wadis of the Hajhir Mountains, from 300 to 800 metres elevation.
