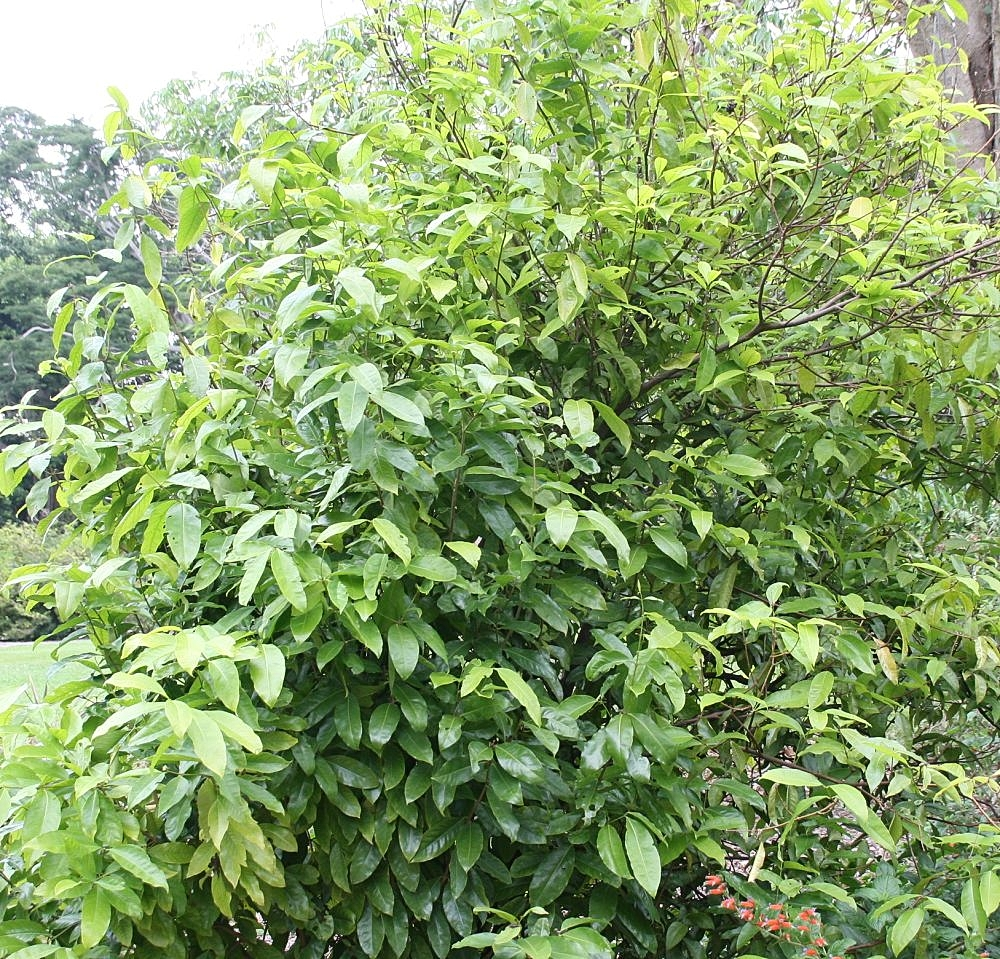

Conservation status
- Least Concern (IUCN 3.1)

Scientific classification
- Kingdom: Plantae
- Clade: Tracheophytes
- Clade: Angiosperms
- Clade: Eudicots
- Clade: Rosids
- Order: Malvales
- Family: Thymelaeaceae
- Genus: Phaleria
- Species: P. perrottetiana

Binomial name
- Phaleria perrottetiana (Decne.) Fern.-Vill.

Synonyms
- Dais laurifolia Blanco; Drimyspermum perrottetianum Decne.; Phaleria splendida Valeton

= Phaleria perrottetiana =

Species of flowering plant

Phaleria perrottetiana is a plant in the family Thymelaeaceae.

== Description ==
Phaleria perrottetiana grows as a shrub or small tree up to 8 metres (26 ft) tall. The twigs are dark brown. Inflorescences bear 20 or more flowers. The fruits are ovoid, up to 3 cm (1 in) long.

== Distribution and habitat ==
Phaleria perrottetiana is native to the Philippines, Maluku Islands, New Guinea and the Solomon Islands. Its habitat is in forests from sea level to 1,140 metres (3,700 ft) altitude.
