= Adriaan van Royen =

Dutch botanist (1704–1779)

Adriaan van Royen FRS
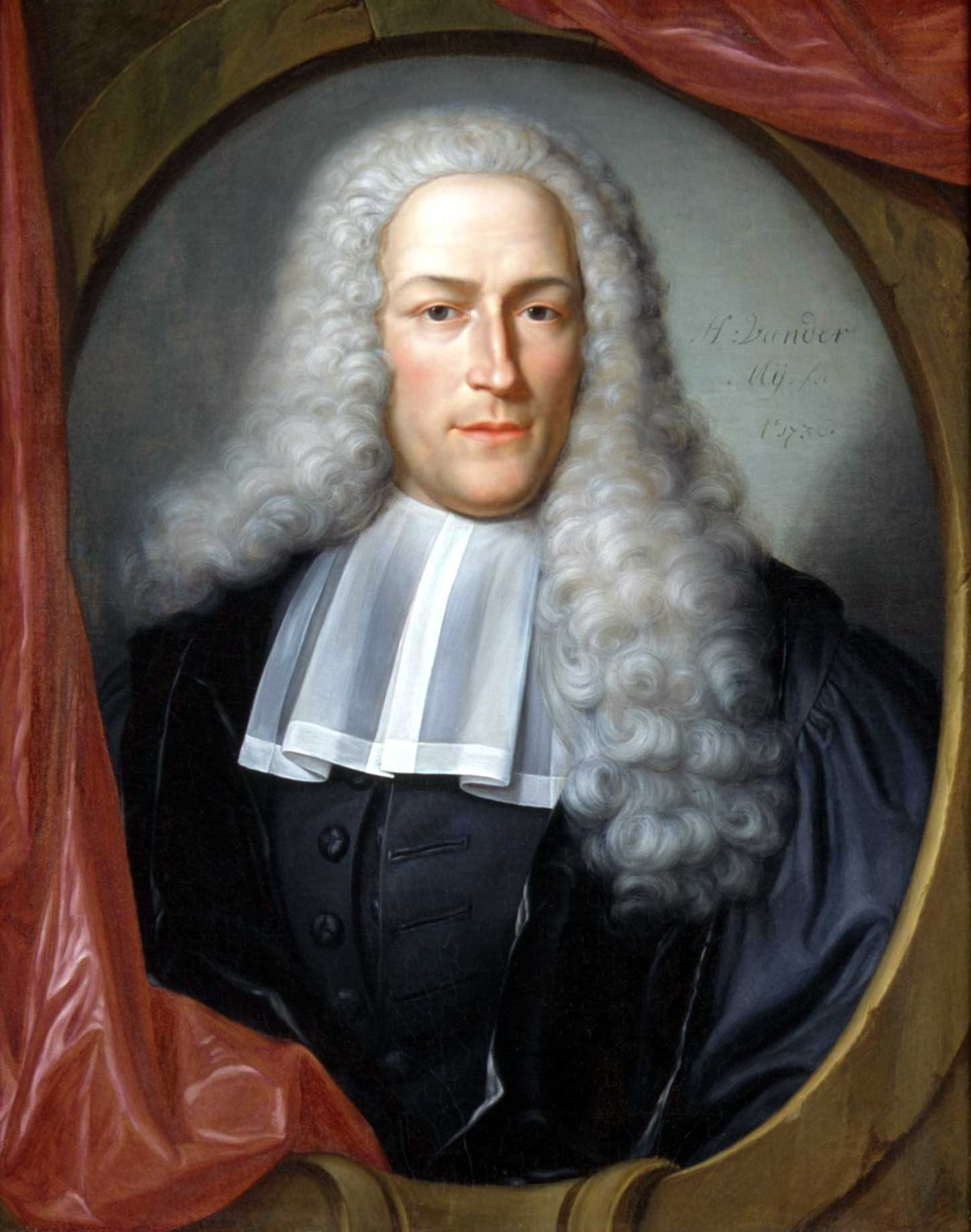
- Adriaan van Royen; Painting by Hieronymus van der Mey]
- Born: 4 November 1704; Leiden
- Died: 28 February 1779 (aged 74); Leiden
- Scientific career
- Fields: Botany
- Institutions: Leiden University
- Author abbrev. (botany): Royen

Adriaan van Royen (11 November 1704 in Leiden – 28 February 1779 in Leiden) was a Dutch botanist. He was a professor at Leiden University and is associated with Carl Linnaeus.

He is best known for his work on flora of Southeast Asia. Adriaan van Royen formed a close relationship with Linnaeus, who had visited the Leiden Botanic Garden during a stay in Leiden between 1737 and 1738.

He was elected a Fellow of the Royal Society in 1728.

He died in Leiden in 1779.

The genus Royena L. (= Diospyros sect. Royena (L.) F.White), in the Ebenaceae, and Melastoma royenii Blume. Sutton, D.A. are named after him.
