= Lasiosiphon =

Scientific classification
- Kingdom: Plantae
- Clade: Tracheophytes
- Clade: Angiosperms
- Clade: Eudicots
- Clade: Rosids
- Order: Malvales
- Family: Thymelaeaceae
- Genus: Lasiosiphon; Fresen. (1838)

Genus of plants

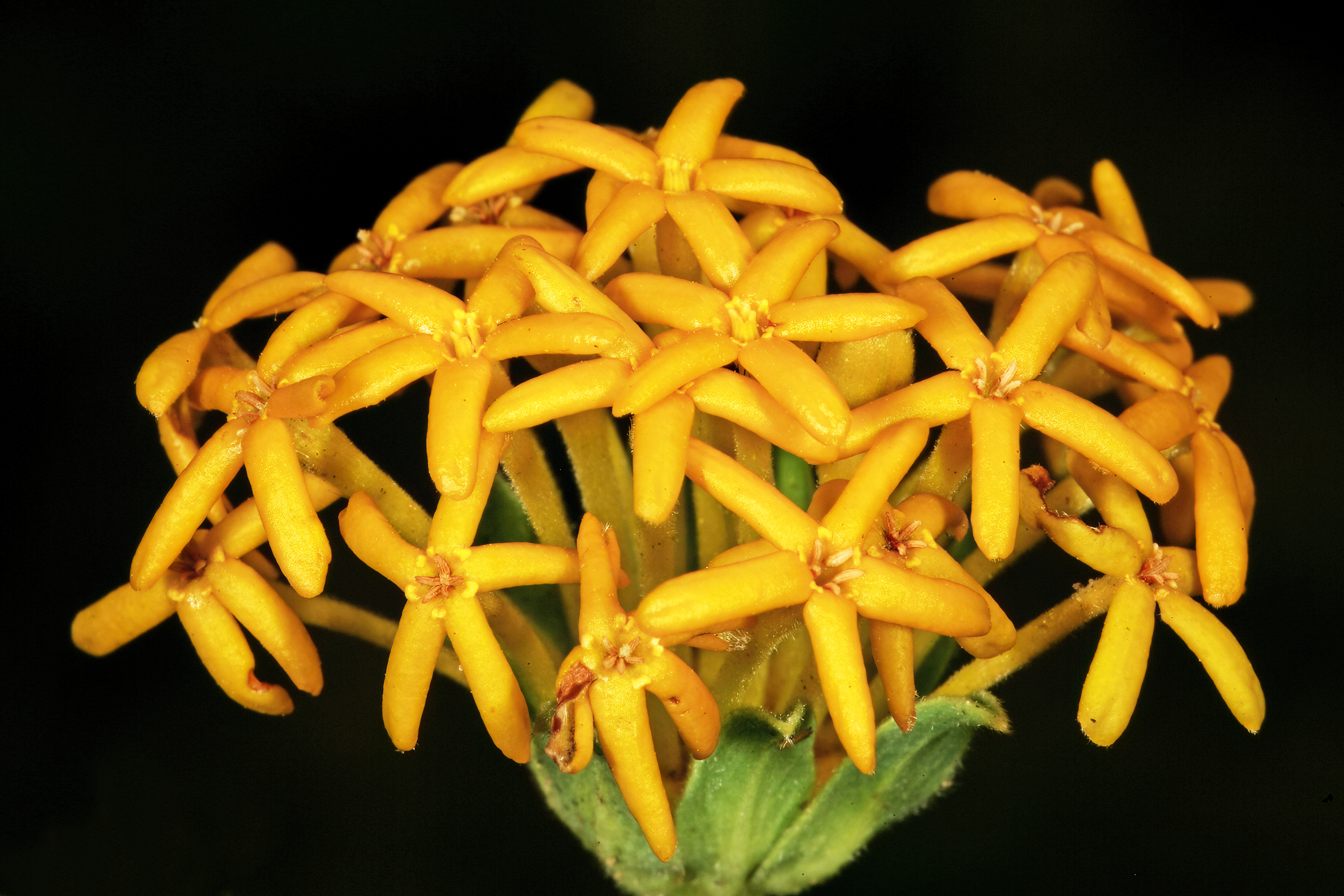

Lasiosiphon is a genus of flowering plants belonging to the family Thymelaeaceae.

Its native range is tropical and southern Africa, Madagascar, southwestern Arabian Peninsula, India, Sri Lanka.

== Species ==
50 species are accepted.

- Lasiosiphon afer Meisn.
- Lasiosiphon ambondrombensis Boiteau
- Lasiosiphon angustifolius (C.H.Wright) Burtt Davy
- Lasiosiphon anthylloides (L.f.) Meisn.
- Lasiosiphon bojerianus Decne.
- Lasiosiphon burchellii Meisn.
- Lasiosiphon calocephalus (Meisn.) Domke
- Lasiosiphon canoargenteus C.H.Wright
- Lasiosiphon capitatus (Lam.) Burtt Davy
- Lasiosiphon danguyanus (Leandri) Boatwr. & J.C.Manning
- Lasiosiphon daphnifolius (L.f.) Boatwr. & J.C.Manning
- Lasiosiphon decaryi Leandri
- Lasiosiphon deserticola (Gilg) C.H.Wright
- Lasiosiphon dregeanus (Meisn.) Endl.
- Lasiosiphon eminii (Engl. & Gilg) H.Pearson
- Lasiosiphon esterhuyseniae Magee & J.C.Manning
- Lasiosiphon gilbertae (Drake) Boatwr. & J.C.Manning
- Lasiosiphon glaucus Fresen.
- Lasiosiphon gnidioides (Baker) Boatwr. & J.C.Manning
- Lasiosiphon hibbertioides S.Moore
- Lasiosiphon humbertii Leandri
- Lasiosiphon insularis (Gardner) Meisn.
- Lasiosiphon kraussianus (Meisn.) Meisn.
- Lasiosiphon kuntzei (Gilg) Kolokoto & Magee
- Lasiosiphon lampranthus (Gilg) H.Pearson
- Lasiosiphon latifolius (Oliv.) Brenan
- Lasiosiphon leandrianus Boatwr. & J.C.Manning
- Lasiosiphon macropetalus (Meisn.) Meisn.
- Lasiosiphon meisnerianus Endl.
- Lasiosiphon microcephalus (Meisn.) J.C.Manning & Magee
- Lasiosiphon microphyllus (Meisn.) Meisn.
- Lasiosiphon mollissimus E.A.Bruce
- Lasiosiphon nanus Burtt Davy
- Lasiosiphon occidentalis Leandri
- Lasiosiphon ornatus Burtt Davy
- Lasiosiphon pedunculatus (Beyers) J.C.Manning & Boatwr.
- Lasiosiphon perrieri Leandri
- Lasiosiphon polyanthus (Gilg) C.H.Wright
- Lasiosiphon polycephalus (E.Mey. ex Meisn.) H.Pearson
- Lasiosiphon pulchellus (Meisn.) Decne.
- Lasiosiphon razakamalalanus (Z.S.Rogers) Boatwr. & J.C.Manning
- Lasiosiphon rigidus J.C.Manning & Boatwr.
- Lasiosiphon rubescens (B.Peterson) J.C.Manning & Magee
- Lasiosiphon sericocephalus (Meisn.) J.C.Manning & Boatwr.
- Lasiosiphon sisparensis (Gardner) Meisn.
- Lasiosiphon socotranus Balf.f.
- Lasiosiphon somalensis (Franch.) H.Pearson
- Lasiosiphon splendens (Meisn.) Endl.
- Lasiosiphon triplinervis Decne.
- Lasiosiphon wilmsii C.H.Wright
