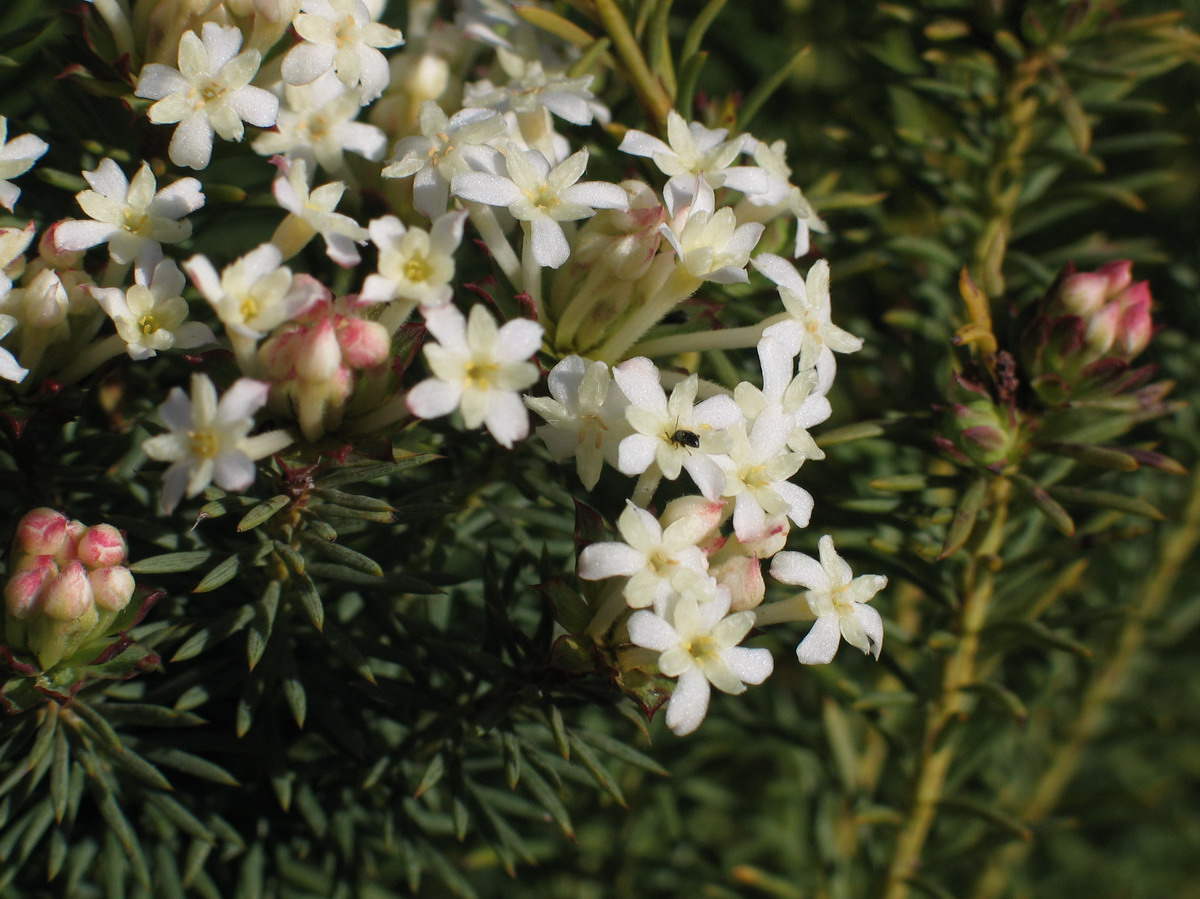
- Gnidia tomentosa

Scientific classification
- Kingdom: Plantae
- Clade: Tracheophytes
- Clade: Angiosperms
- Clade: Eudicots
- Clade: Rosids
- Order: Malvales
- Family: Thymelaeaceae
- Subfamily: Thymelaeoideae
- Genus: Gnidia; L. (1753)

Species
- 104, see text

Synonyms
- Arthrosolen C.A.Mey. (2024); Basutica Phillips (1944); Canalia F.W.Schmidt (1793); Craspedostoma Domke (1934); Dessenia Adans. (1763); Epichrocantha Eckl. & Zeyh. ex Meisn. (1857), not validly publ.; Gnidiopsis Tiegh. (1893); Nectandra P.J.Bergius (1767), nom. rej.; Pseudognidia E.Phillips (1944); Rhytidosolen Tiegh. (1893); Struthia Royen ex L. (1758); Struthiolopsis E.Phillips (1944); Thymelina Hoffmanns. (1824); Trimeiandra Raf. (1838)

= Gnidia =

Genus of flowering plants

Gnidia is a genus of flowering plants in the family Thymelaeaceae. It is distributed in tropical and southern Africa and Madagascar; more than half of all the species are endemic to South Africa. Gnidia was named for Knidos, an Ancient Greek city located in modern-day Turkey.

These are perennial herbs and shrubs, sometimes with rhizomes. Most species have alternately arranged leaves, and a few have opposite leaves. The leaves are undivided and unlobed. The inflorescence is a head of a few to many flowers. The calyx is cylindrical and the colored lobes may alternate with the petals; some species lack petals. Many species are similar in appearance and difficult to tell apart.

Molecular analyses have provided evidence that the genus is polyphyletic, made up of four different lineages. They are related to the four genera Struthiola, Drapetes, Lasiosiphon, and Pimelea.

Formerly 140 to 160 species were classified in the genus. Many have been reassigned to other genera and Plants of the World Online currently accepts 104 species.

== Species ==
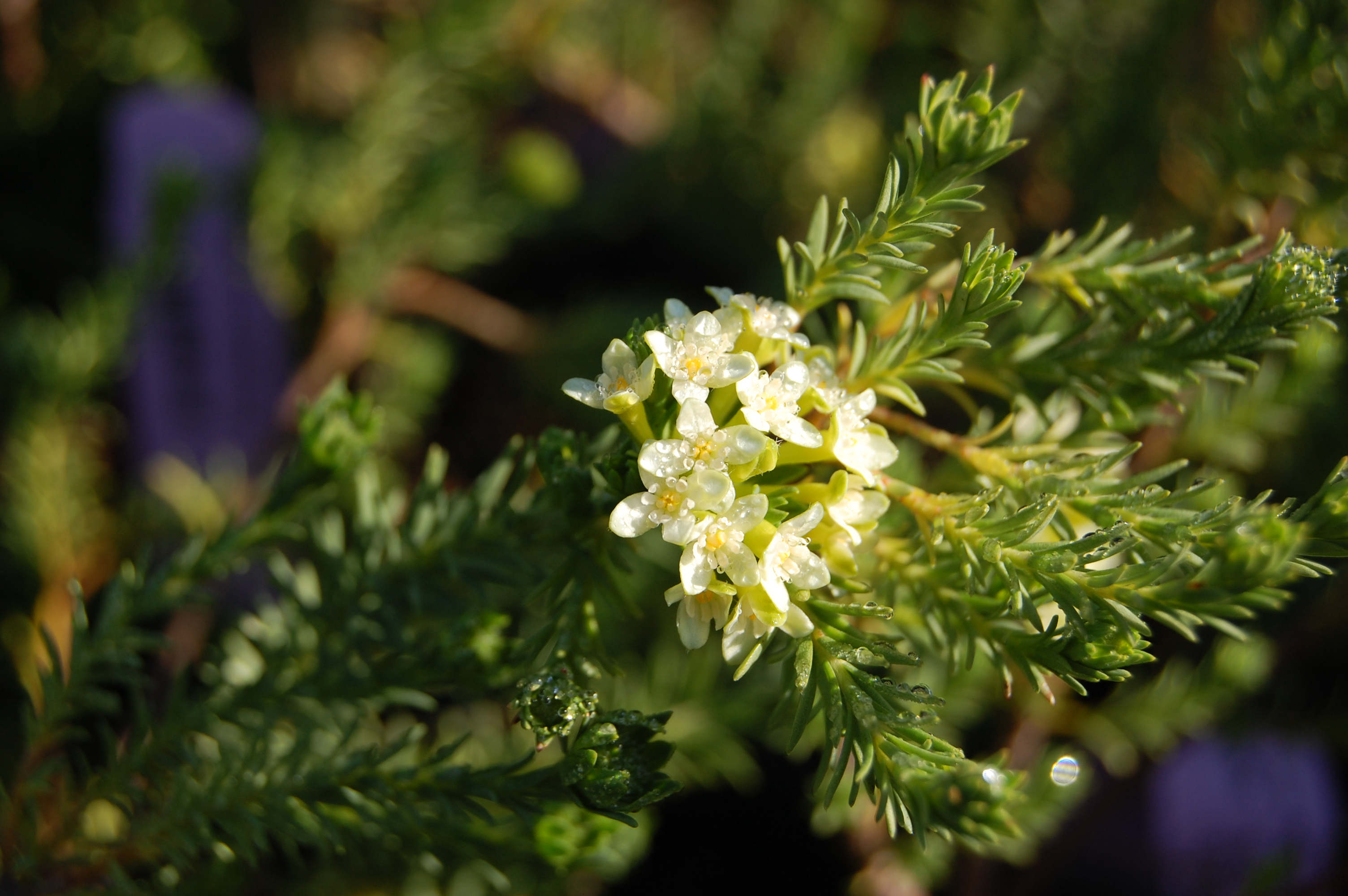
Gnidia polystachya

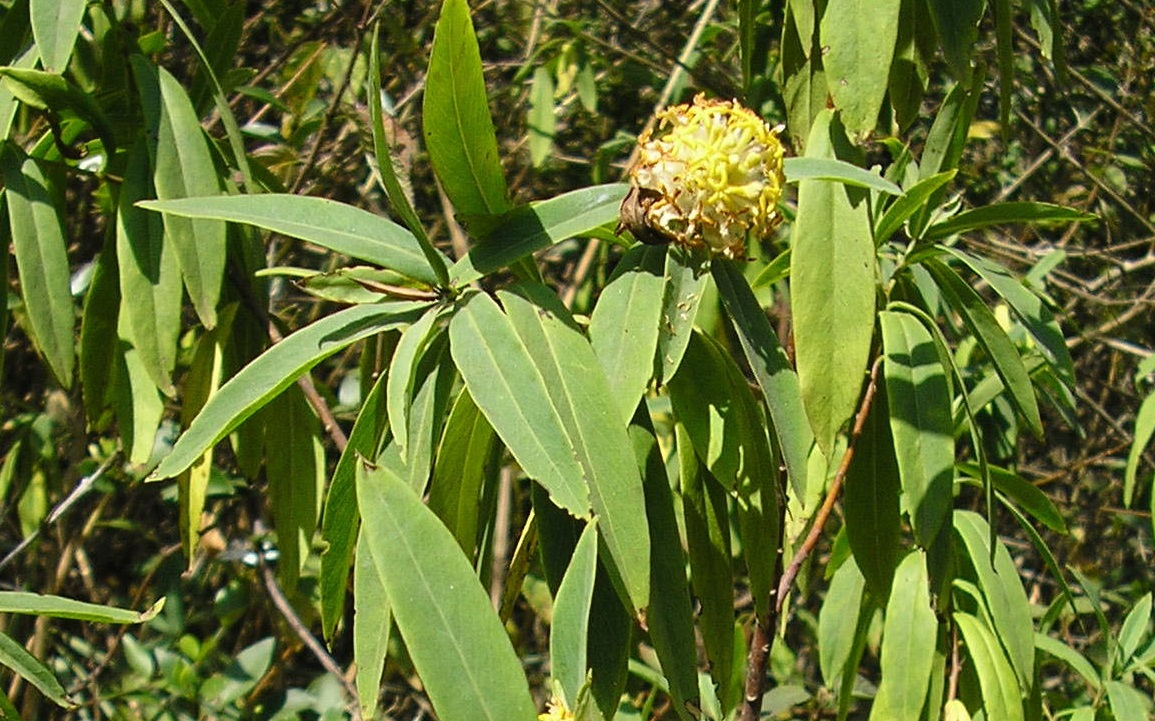
Gnidia glauca

104 species are accepted.

- Gnidia aberrans C.H.Wright
- Gnidia anomala Meisn.
- Gnidia apiculata (Oliv.) Gilg
- Gnidia bambutana Gilg & Ledermann ex Engl.
- Gnidia baumiana Gilg
- Gnidia baurii C.H.Wright
- Gnidia burmanni Eckl. & Zeyh. ex Meisn.
- Gnidia caniflora Meisn.
- Gnidia cayleyi C.H.Wright
- Gnidia chapmanii B.Peterson
- Gnidia chrysantha (Solms ex Schweinf.) Gilg
- Gnidia chrysophylla Meisn.
- Gnidia clavata Schinz
- Gnidia compacta (C.H.Wright) J.H.Ross
- Gnidia coriacea Meisn.
- Gnidia cyanea Burch.
- Gnidia decurrens Meisn.
- Gnidia dekindtiana Gilg
- Gnidia dumicola S.Moore
- Gnidia elkerensis Friis & Sebsebe
- Gnidia ericoides C.H.Wright
- Gnidia fastigiata Rendle
- Gnidia flanaganii C.H.Wright
- Gnidia foliosa (H.Pearson) Engl.
- Gnidia francisci Bolus
- Gnidia fraterna (N.E.Br.) E.Phillips
- Gnidia fruticulosa Gilg
- Gnidia fulgens Welw.
- Gnidia galpinii C.H.Wright
- Gnidia geminiflora E.Mey. ex Meisn.
- Gnidia goetzeana Gilg
- Gnidia gossweileri (S.Moore) B.Peterson
- Gnidia gymnostachya (Meisn.) Gilg
- Gnidia harveyana Meisn.
- Gnidia hirsuta (L.) Thulin
- Gnidia hockii De Wild.
- Gnidia humilis Meisn.
- Gnidia imbricata L.f.
- Gnidia inconspicua Meisn.
- Gnidia insignis Compton
- Gnidia involucrata Steud. ex A.Rich.
- Gnidia juniperifolia Lam.
- Gnidia kasaiensis S.Moore
- Gnidia kundelungensis S.Moore
- Gnidia laxa (L.f.) Gilg
- Gnidia leipoldtii C.H.Wright
- Gnidia linearifolia (Wikstr.) B.Peterson
- Gnidia linoides Wikstr.
- Gnidia meyeri Meisn.
- Gnidia mollis C.H.Wright
- Gnidia multiflora Bartl. ex Meisn.
- Gnidia myrtifolia C.H.Wright
- Gnidia nana (L.f.) Wikstr.
- Gnidia neglecta Z.S.Rogers
- Gnidia newtonii Gilg
- Gnidia nitida Bolus ex C.H.Wright
- Gnidia nodiflora Meisn.
- Gnidia obtusissima Meisn.
- Gnidia oliveriana Engl. & Gilg
- Gnidia oppositifolia L.
- Gnidia orbiculata C.H.Wright
- Gnidia ornata (Meisn.) Gilg
- Gnidia pallida Meisn.
- Gnidia parviflora Meisn.
- Gnidia parvula Dod
- Gnidia penicillata Licht. ex Meisn.
- Gnidia phaeotricha Gilg
- Gnidia pinifolia L.
- Gnidia pleurocephala Gilg
- Gnidia poggei Gilg
- Gnidia polystachya P.J.Bergius
- Gnidia propinqua (Hilliard) B.Peterson
- Gnidia quadrifaria C.H.Wright
- Gnidia quarrei A.Robyns
- Gnidia racemosa Thunb.
- Gnidia rendlei Hiern
- Gnidia renniana Hilliard & B.L.Burtt
- Gnidia robynsiana Lisowski
- Gnidia rubrocincta Gilg
- Gnidia scabra Thunb.
- Gnidia scabrida Meisn.
- Gnidia sericea L.
- Gnidia setosa Wikstr.
- Gnidia simplex L.
- Gnidia singularis Hilliard
- Gnidia sonderiana Meisn.
- Gnidia sparsiflora Bartl. ex Meisn.
- Gnidia spicata (L.f.) Gilg
- Gnidia squarrosa (L.) Druce
- Gnidia stellatifolia Gand.
- Gnidia stenophylla Gilg
- Gnidia strigillosa Meisn.
- Gnidia styphelioides Meisn.
- Gnidia subulata Lam.
- Gnidia tenella Meisn.
- Gnidia thesioides Meisn.
- Gnidia tomentosa L.
- Gnidia usafuae Gilg
- Gnidia variabilis (C.H.Wright) Engl.
- Gnidia variegata Gand.
- Gnidia virescens Wikstr.
- Gnidia welwitschii Hiern
- Gnidia wickstroemiana Meisn.
- Gnidia woodii C.H.Wright

=== Formerly placed here ===
- Lasiosiphon socotranus Balf.f. (as Gnidia socotrana (Balf.f.) Gilg)
