= Struthiola =

- Struthiola myrsinites — Gonnabos

Scientific classification
- Kingdom: Plantae
- Clade: Tracheophytes
- Clade: Angiosperms
- Clade: Eudicots
- Clade: Rosids
- Order: Malvales
- Family: Thymelaeaceae
- Subfamily: Thymelaeoideae
- Genus: Struthiola; L. (1767)

Synonyms
- Belvala Adans. (1763)

Family of shrubs

Struthiola is a genus of plants in the family Thymelaeaceae. In habit they are ericoid shrubs or shrublets. The genus includes 31 species native to Africa, which range from Ethiopia to South Africa.

== Overview ==
There are forty-odd species, mainly South African, mainly occurring in the Western Cape, about 25 endemic to fynbos. Their leaves are usually opposite, but sometimes alternate. Their flowers are sessile and generally solitary, but sometimes in pairs in the axils of the upper leaves. Each flower is accompanied by two ciliate bracteoles. The calyx is roughly cylindrical, with four lobes joined into a tube. The lobes are ovate to linear. There are four or eight or even twelve fleshy, subterete petals (Manning refers to them as petal-scales or petal-like-scales.) The petals are shorter than the calyx-lobes, and are surrounded by short hairs. There are four stamens arising from deep in throat of calyx-tube. The anthers are subsessile and linear, sometimes with an apical appendage. The ovary has a single loculus with a single glabrous ovule. The style is lateral, with a simple stigma, which is usually penicillate with short hairs. The fruit is small, typically 1–3mm, dry, included in the persistent base of the calyx-tube.

== Naming and etymology ==
The structure of the fruit in its calyx-remnant has been likened to the beak of a sparrow and gave rise to the name "Struthiola", from the Latin strutheus for a sparrow or strouthos for any small bird.

As usual for such inconspicuous plants, common names are neither very helpful, nor consistent. The name "stroop bossie" ("syrup bush") is locally applied to Struthiola ciliata, suggesting that rural children might have been experimenting with sucking the flowers, but such explanations are necessarily speculative. One or all species are referred to as "gonna", sometimes qualified, for example "soetgonna" (meaning "sweet gonna", for Struthiola dodecandra), or "aandgonna" ("evening gonna", for Struthiola argentea). "Gonna" however, also is variously applied to the recognisably similar genus Passerina and to some other genera in the Thymelaeaceae, such as Dais. So are some other variations such as "ganna", but because they are informal and local, it is not practical to be authoritative about the limits to their correct application.

== Species ==
There are 31 species assigned to this genus:

- Struthiola angustiloba B.Peterson & Hilliard
- Struthiola anomala Hilliard
- Struthiola argentea Lehm.
- Struthiola bachmanniana Gilg
- Struthiola cicatricosa C.H.Wright
- Struthiola ciliata (L.) Lam.
- Struthiola confusa C.H.Wright
- Struthiola dodecandra (L.) Druce
- Struthiola eckloniana Meisn.
- Struthiola ericoides C.H.Wright
- Struthiola fasciata C.H.Wright
- Struthiola garciana C.H.Wright
- Struthiola hirsuta Wikstr.
- Struthiola leptantha Bolus
- Struthiola lineariloba Meisn.
- Struthiola macowanii C.H.Wright
- Struthiola martiana Meisn.
- Struthiola montana B.Peterson
- Struthiola mundii Eckl. ex Meisn.
- Struthiola myrsinites Lam.
- Struthiola parviflora Bartl. ex Meisn.
- Struthiola pondoensis Gilg ex C.H.Wright
- Struthiola recta C.H.Wright
- Struthiola rhodesiana B.Peterson
- Struthiola rigida Meisn.
- Struthiola salteri Levyns
- Struthiola scaettae Staner
- Struthiola striata Lam.
- Struthiola tetralepis Schltr.
- Struthiola thomsonii Oliv.
- Struthiola tomentosa Andrews

== Horticultural significance ==
Struthiola species are not spectacular plants; in their sparse ericoid habit they are typical of fynbos scrub, though also typically of such scrub, they are very attractive in the fine detail of their flowers and structure.

Curiously, in spite of their modest appearance they have been quietly popular as garden plants, particularly among collectors, perhaps because of their delicate, unexpectedly arresting nocturnal scent. Although some species, such as Struthiola myrsinites, flower quite attractively, the flowering of smaller species is easily overlooked by day, though a single plant can scent a porch on a still, warm night. This is in keeping with their narrow flowers being pollinated by small moths with fine proboscises.
