= Hognut =

Hognut or pignut can mean any of a number of unrelated plants:

- Bunium bulbocastanum (black cumin) or Conopodium majus (kippernut) of the Apiaceae
- rushpeas, particularly Hoffmannseggia glauca (Indian rushpea) and Hoffmannseggia densiflora, of the Fabaceae
- Carya glabra (pignut hickory) of the Juglandaceae
- Hyptis suaveolens (chan), also known as Mesosphaerum suaveolens, of the Lamiaceae

pig nut may also refer to pelleted Animal feed designed for pigs.
