= Earth chestnut =

Earth chestnut is a common name for several plants and may refer to:

- Bunium bulbocastanum
- Conopodium majus

== See also ==
- Earthnut (disambiguation)
