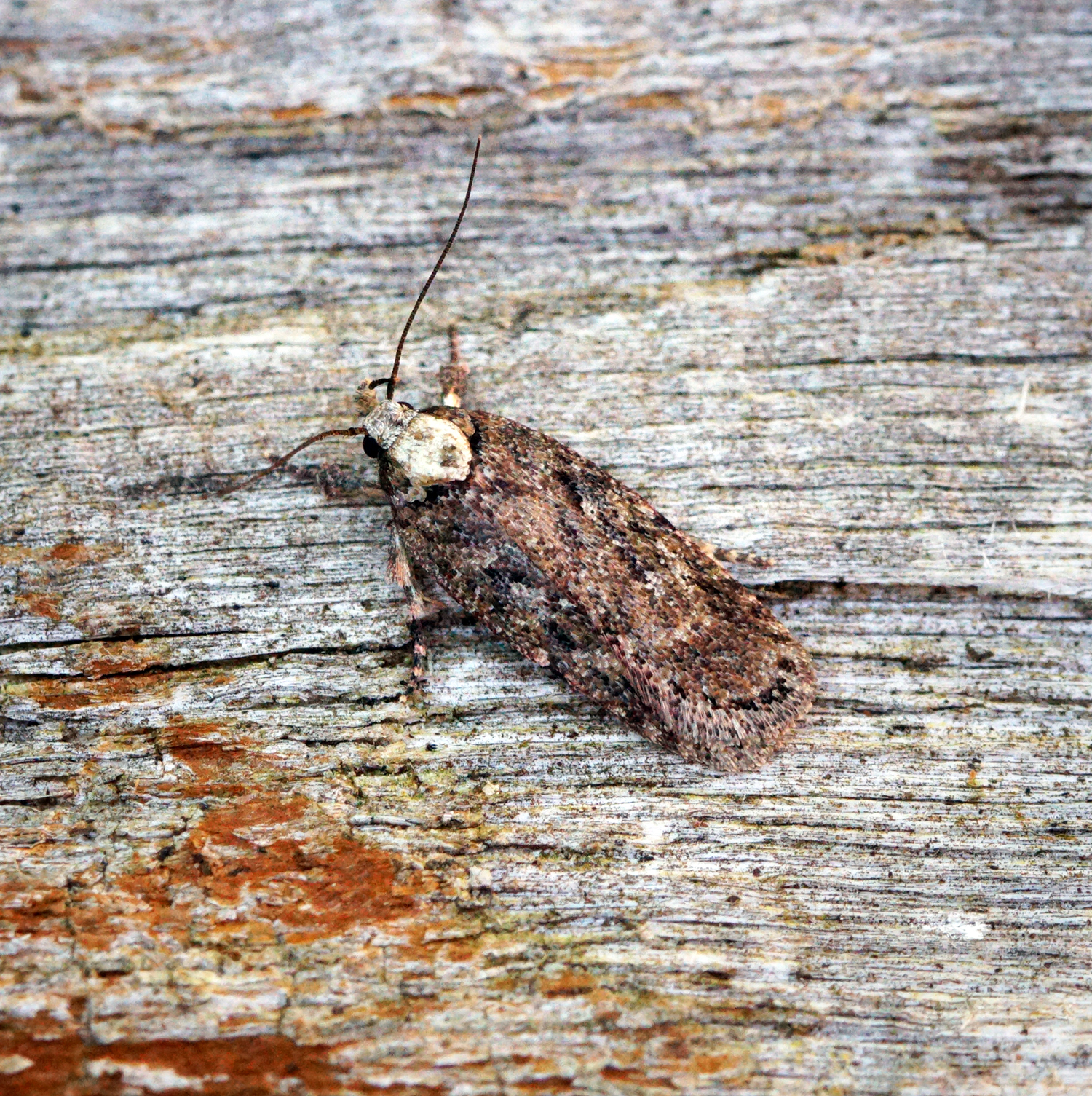

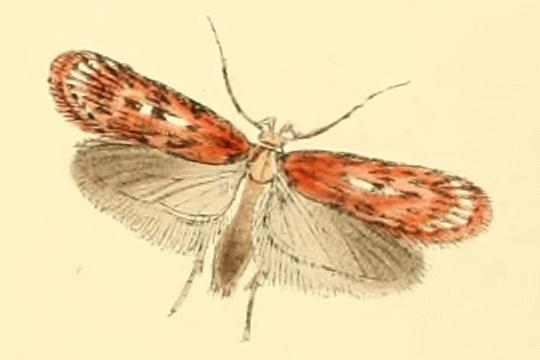

Scientific classification
- Kingdom: Animalia
- Phylum: Arthropoda
- Clade: Pancrustacea
- Class: Insecta
- Order: Lepidoptera
- Family: Depressariidae
- Genus: Depressaria
- Species: D. pulcherrimella

Binomial name
- Depressaria pulcherrimella Stainton, 1849

Synonyms
- Depressaria semenovi Krulikovsky, 1903

= Depressaria pulcherrimella =

Species of moth

Depressaria pulcherrimella is a moth of the family Depressariidae. It is found in most of Europe, except the Balkan Peninsula.

The wingspan is 16–19 mm and the head and thorax are rosy-grey-whitish. The terminal joint of palpi with two blackish bands. The forewings of the Depressaria pulcherrimella are rather narrow, and light reddish in color - fuscous, sprinkled with whitish and dark fuscous; some indistinct dark fuscous dashes; one more conspicuous in disc before middle, followed by whitish scales; second discal stigma whitish; a faint pale angulated fascia at 3/4. Hindwings are fuscous-whitish, more fuscous posteriorly.

Adults are on wing from June to September.

The larvae between the spun leaves of Pimpinella saxifraga and Daucus species and spun flowers and seeds of Conopodium species. Other recorded food plants include Cnidium, Bunium and Valeriana species.
