= Neoconopodium =

Scientific classification
- Kingdom: Plantae
- Clade: Tracheophytes
- Clade: Angiosperms
- Clade: Eudicots
- Clade: Asterids
- Order: Apiales
- Family: Apiaceae
- Subfamily: Apioideae
- Tribe: Scandiceae
- Subtribe: Scandicinae
- Genus: Neoconopodium (Koso-Pol.) Pimenov & Kljuykov

Species
- See text.

Genus of plants

Neoconopodium is a genus of flowering plant in the family Apiaceae, native to Pakistan and the western Himalayas. It may be subsumed into the genus Kozlovia.

== Taxonomy ==
The genus was first described in 1987 by M. G. Pimenov and E. V. Kljuyko. They treated a subgeneric taxon of Conopodium, Neoconopodium, first described by Boris Koso-Poljansky in 1916, as the basionym. Their genus Neoconopodium was distinguished from Anthriscus, Chaerophyllum, Krasnovia and Butinia (now included in Conopodium) based on seed characters. A 2001 study using ribosomal DNA found that Neoconopodium, Krasnovia and Kozlovia were closely related within tribe Scandiceae subtribe Scandicinae, and proposed that they be combined into Kozlovia. As of December 2022, this proposal had been accepted by the Germplasm Resources Information Network, but not by Plants of the World Online.

=== Species ===
As of December 2022, Plants of the World Online accepted the following species:

- Neoconopodium capnoides (Decne.) Pimenov & Kljuykov, syn. Kozlovia capnoides
- Neoconopodium paddarensis S.Thakur, B.Singh, Tashi & H.C.Dutt
