= Earthnut =

Earthnut is a common name for several unrelated plants which produce a subterranean edible seed, fruit or root

Earthnut may refer to:

- Truffle
- Peanut
- Roots and tubers:
  - Lathyrus tuberosus
  - Conopodium majus
  - Bunium persicum

== See also ==
- Groundnut (disambiguation)
