= Hog potato =

Hog potato is a common name for several plants with edible or poisonous bulbs and tubers. Hog potato may refer to:

- Deathcamas, a group of several plants with poisonous bulbs, formerly placed in the genus Zigadenus, native throughout North America
- Hoffmannseggia glauca, a legume with edible tubers native to the Southwestern United States
- Ipomoea pandurata, a species of morning glory with edible tubers native to Eastern North America
