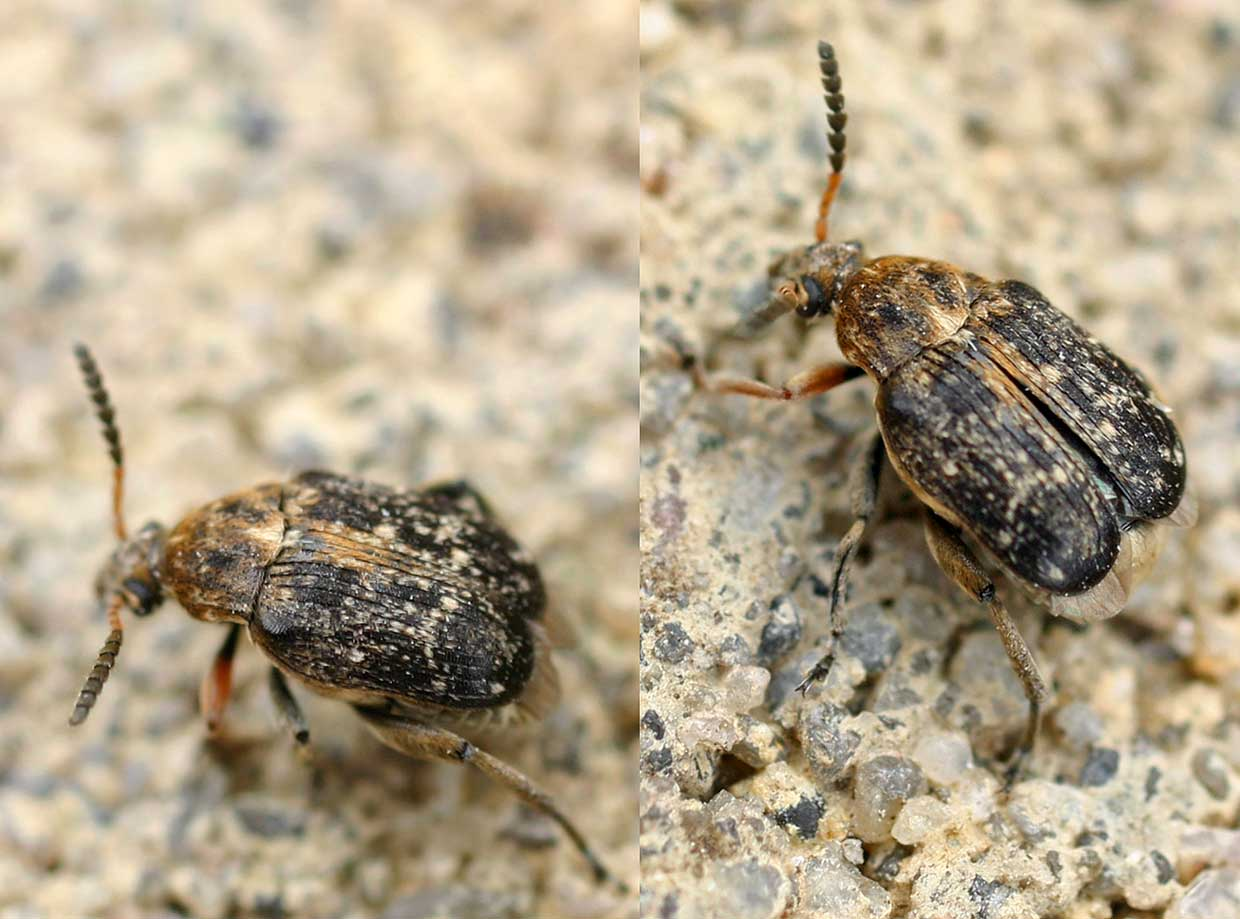

Scientific classification
- Kingdom: Animalia
- Phylum: Arthropoda
- Clade: Pancrustacea
- Class: Insecta
- Order: Coleoptera
- Suborder: Polyphaga
- Infraorder: Cucujiformia
- Family: Chrysomelidae
- Genus: Bruchus
- Species: B. pisorum

Binomial name
- Bruchus pisorum (Linnaeus, 1758)

= Bruchus pisorum =

Species of beetle

Bruchus pisorum, known generally as pea weevil, is a species of leaf beetle in the family Chrysomelidae. Other common names include the pea beetle and pea seed beetle. It is found in Europe and Northern Asia (excluding China), North America, and temperate Asia.

== Taxonomy ==
Bruchus pisorum, commonly known as the pea weevil, was described by Linnaeus (1758) and given the name Dermestes pisorum, Linnaeus (1767) later created the genus Bruchus for seed-beetles and designed B. pisorum as the type species. The genus Bruchus was originally placed within the family Curculionidae (weevils) because of elongated facial parts and four segmental tarsi. This is probably why it remains universally, though incorrectly, known as the pea weevil. The seed-beetles were later separated into their own family by Spinola (1843), and Lacordaire (1845) reinforced the position of Bruchidae within the superfamily Chrysomeloidea.

== Description ==
B. pisorum is a short, stout beetle with an oval body about 5mm in length. It ranges in color from soft grey to black with patches of white scales that form white spots on the elytra. The elytra are shorter than the abdomen, exposing large white patches as its base. The head is short and strongly constricted behind the eyes. Antennae extend to less than one-third of the body length. The pea weevil also has a well-defined denticle on the lateral margin of the pronotum.

== Distribution ==
The natural range of Bruchus pisorum is Asia minor, wherever its host species is present (Borowiec 1987a). Its ability to survive in the dry pea seed for an extended time has led to it being transported to other regions rather than through migrating naturally, such that it is now considered cosmopolitan. Harris (1841) reported that, while on a collecting trip for Linnaeus in 1748, Peter Kalm found the pea weevil in the US and infestations were of such a high level that the pea could no longer be grown successfully as a crop in several States. The weevil has since spread and become a pest in all pea-growing areas of the US. In 1918 Skaife reported the establishment of the pea weevil in South Africa.

The pea weevil is a serious pest of peas in most of Southern Russia (Vasilev 1939). Also, a survey found the pea weevil in south-eastern Europe and the Middle East including, Bulgaria, Yugoslavia, Albania, Greece, Turkey, Syria, Lebanon, Israel, Iran and Afghanistan (Borowiec 1987b). Its presence has also been reported in Japan (Yoshida 1959) and part of China (Anon 1966). It is also found in South America and has been described as the principal pest of peas in Chile (Olalquiga 1953). By the early 1930s, the peas weevil was established in several areas of South Western Australia (Newman 1932)

== Life cycle ==
The pea weevil is a univoltine species. In South Australia, adult weevils leave their overwintering sites and arrive in pea crops in early Spring. They may arrive as early as mid-August, but most years they arrive in early September (Baker 1990a). Estimates of fecundity range from three eggs to 735 eggs per female.

The bright yellow-orange eggs are laid singly on the surface pods and eggs usually hatch in three to five weeks, depending on the temperature. (Skaife 1918). Young larvae chew directly through the pod wall from the underside of the egg. Once inside the pod, they search for a soft developing seed. The pea weevil has four distinct larval instars (Brindley 1933). Larval development ranges from seven to 11 weeks and pupation from two to three weeks. Adults either emerge over summer from the seed of unharvested crops and fly to overwintering sites or remain in the harvested seed until the following Spring, or until they are disturbed.

== Behavior ==
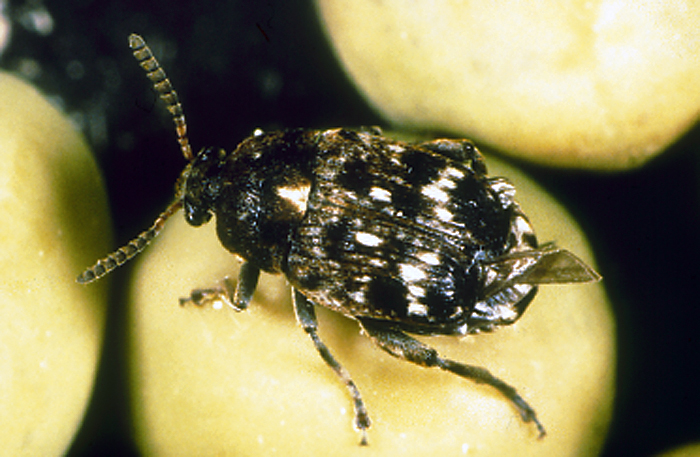
Pea weevil, Bruchus pisorum

The behavior of the pea weevil is poorly understood. When pea weevil arrives in a pea crop, they congregate along its edge, just how they find the crop and why they stay close to the edge for some time is not known. However, it appears that the range of species acceptable for oviposition is narrower than the range suitable for larval development (Jermy and Szentesi 1978). This was confirmed by Annis and Okeeffe (1984a) who found no difference in survival of larvae placed in green pods of P. sativum and L. saivus.

The arrival of pea weevil is a crop that often coincides with the commencement of flowering, but if there are no flowers they shelter in the vegetative parts of the crop. Panji and Sood (1975) found that feeding on pea pollen by both sexes was a prerequisite for copulation whereas Pesho and Van Houton (1982) found the ingestion of pea pollen did not initiate the development of ovaries. Ovaries of weevil have been shown to mature when the adult feeds on pollen of species other than that of cultivated pea (Annis and Okeeffe 1984b).

The females fly through the crop searching for pea pods on which to oviposit. It is not known if this is a random process or if they select pods of a particular length and age. It is also unknown whatever the presence of eggs on a pod influences subsequent oviposition on it. Longer pods have more eggs, and few eggs are laid on pods once seeds have filled (Brindley 1933: Smith 1990).
