= Andrey Beketov =

Russian botanist (1825–1902)

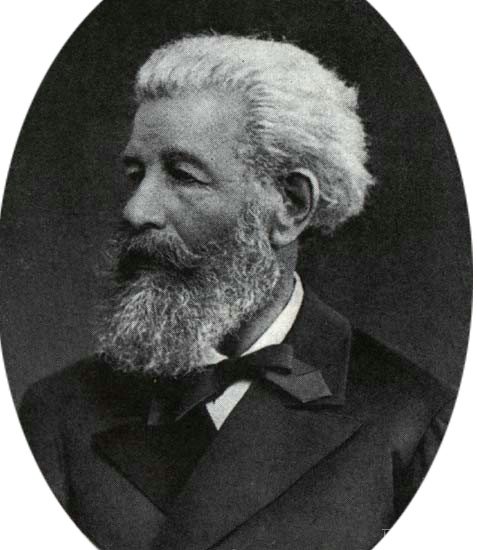
- Born: Андрей Николаевич Бекетов; 8 December 1825; Alferyevka, Serdobsky Uyezd, Saratov Governorate, Russian Empire
- Died: 14 July 1902 (aged 76); Shakhmatovo, Moscow Governorate, Imperial Russia
- Occupations: botanist, translator, editor, pedagogue

Andrey Nikolayevich Beketov (Russian: Андрей Николаевич Бекетов, 8 December 1825 — 1 July 1902) was a Russian botanist, an Honourable member of the Saint Petersburg Academy of Sciences.

Beketov, the Meritorious Professor of Saint Petersburg University (which he was the head of in 1876–1883) was also a famous pedagogue and lecturer; among his best-known students were Andrey Krasnov, Vladimir Vernadsky, Kliment Timiryazev and Ivan Shmalhausen. Beketov initiated the inception of the High Women's Courses which he was the head of until 1889 when they were reorganized, to be known later as the Bestuzhev Courses.

He edited the Works of Free Economical Society (for which he was for several years the secretary and, since 1891 its vice-president) and, in 1861–1863, the Russian Geographical Society Herald (Вестник Русского географического oбщества). Together with Khristofor Gobi he co-founded Scripta Botanica (Ботанические записки), the first ever Russian magazine on botany. In 1892-1897 he edited the botany section of the Brockhaus and Efron Encyclopedic Dictionary.

In the early 1860s Beketov authored the first comprehensive Russian textbook on botany, followed in 1896 by the textbook on the geography of plants. He translated into Russian several seminal works by Alphonse Pyramus de Candolle, August Grisebach, Matthias Jakob Schleiden and Thomas Henry Huxley.

The renowned Silver Age poet Alexander Blok was his grandson.

The standard author abbreviation Bek. is used to indicate this person as the author when citing a botanical name.
