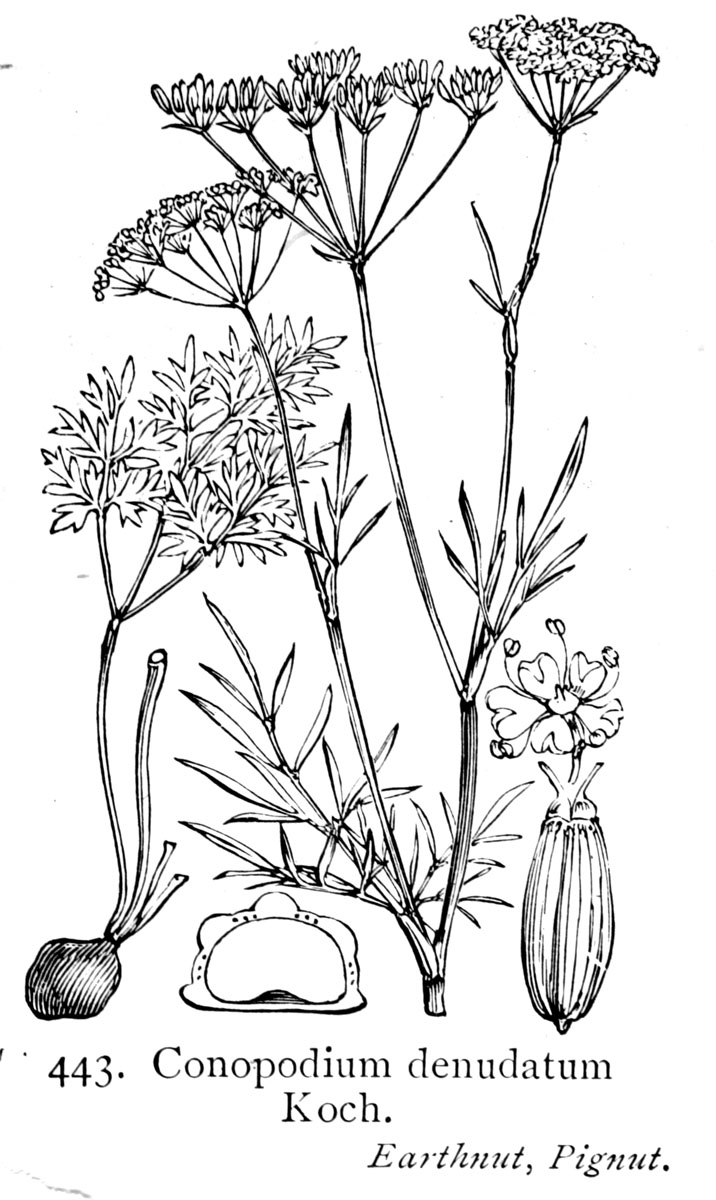

Scientific classification
- Kingdom: Plantae
- Clade: Tracheophytes
- Clade: Angiosperms
- Clade: Eudicots
- Clade: Asterids
- Order: Apiales
- Family: Apiaceae
- Genus: Conopodium
- Species: C. majus

Binomial name
- Conopodium majus (Gouan) Loret.

Synonyms
- Bunium flexuosum Stokes; Conopodium denudatum Koch

= Conopodium majus =

Species of flowering plant

Conopodium majus is a perennial herbaceous flowering plant in the celery family, Apiaceae. Its underground part resembles a chestnut and is sometimes eaten as a wild or cultivated root vegetable. The plant has many English names (many of them shared with Bunium bulbocastanum, a related plant with similar appearance and uses) variously including kippernut, cipernut, arnut, jarnut, hawknut, earth chestnut, groundnut, and earthnut. From its popularity with pigs come the names pignut, hognut, and more indirectly Saint Anthony's nut, for Anthony the Great or Anthony of Padua, both patron saints of swineherds. (Other plants sharing these names include groundnut, earthnut, and hognut.)

== Description ==
It has a smooth, slender, stem, up to 40 centimetres (16 in) high, much-divided leaves, and small, white flowers in many-rayed terminal compound umbels.

The rounded "nut" (inconsistently described by authorities as a tuber, corm, or root) is similar to a chestnut in its brown colour and its size, up to 25 millimetres (1 in) in diameter; its sweet, aromatic flavour has been compared to that of the chestnut, hazelnut, sweet potato, and Brazil nut.

== Distribution and habitat ==
The plant is common and native to western Europe, the British Isles and Norway. It grows in hedgerows, woods and fields and is an indicator of long-established grassland.

It is never found on alkaline soils in the wild.

== Uses ==
This species responds to cultivation by producing larger tubers. With careful selective breeding, it is probably possible to produce a much more productive plant.

Palatable and nutritious, its eating qualities are widely praised, and it is popular among wild food foragers, but it remains a minor crop, due in part to its low yields and difficulty of harvest.

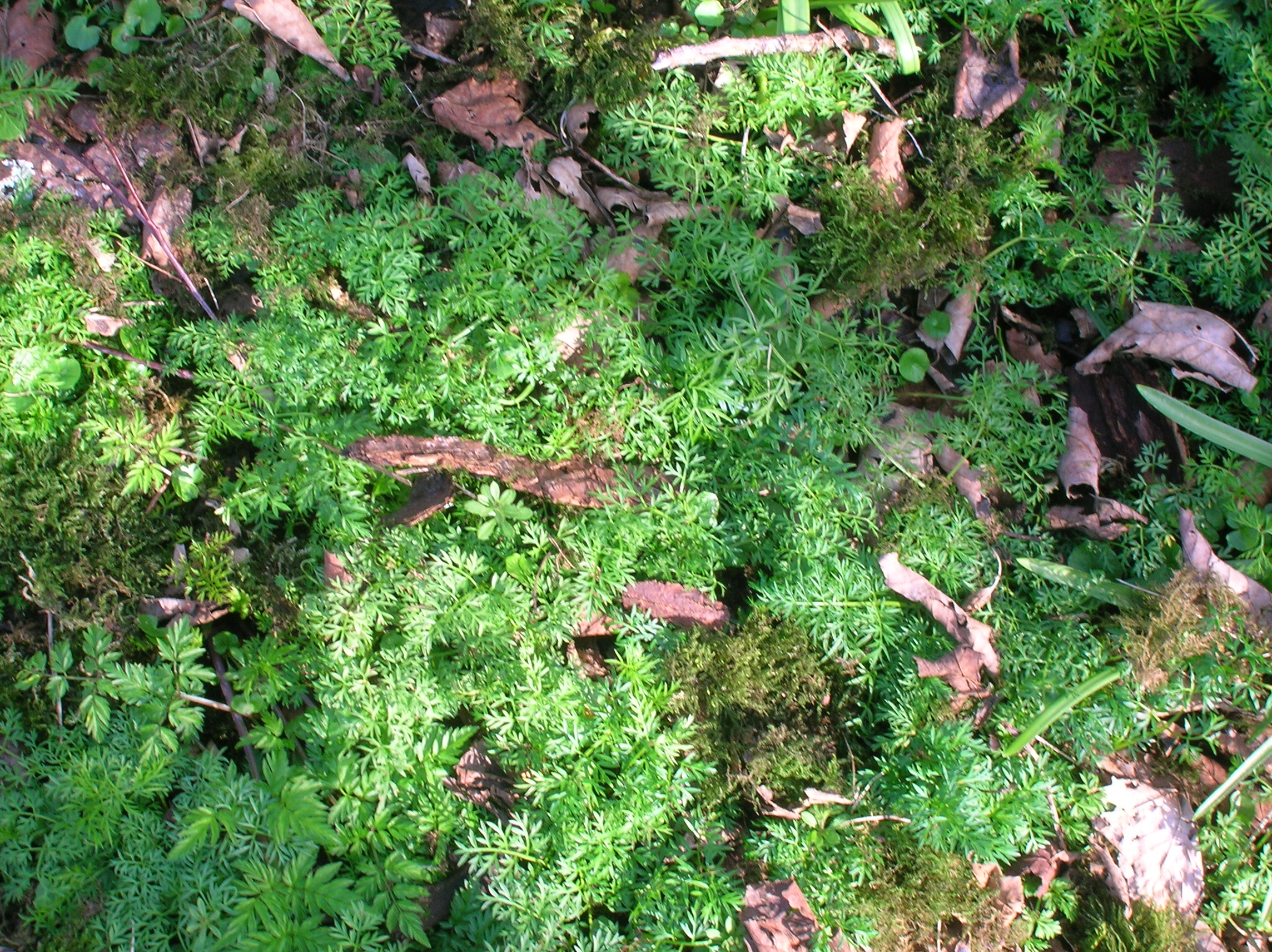
Pignut in early spring in Scotland

== In culture ==
William Shakespeare wrote, "I prithee, let me bring thee where crabs grow; and I with my long nails will dig thee pignuts".

Nicholas Culpeper wrote in his Complete Herbal:

A description of them were needless, for every child knows them. Government and virtues: They are something hot and dry in quality, under the dominion of Venus; they provoke lust exceedingly, and stir up those sports she is mistress of; the seed is excellent good to provoke urine; and so also is the root, but it does not perform it so forcibly as the seed doth. The root being dried and beaten into powder, and the powder being made into an electuary, is a singular remedy for spitting and pissing of blood, as the former chestnut was for coughs.
