= Andrei Krasnov =

Russian botanist and geographer (1862–1914)

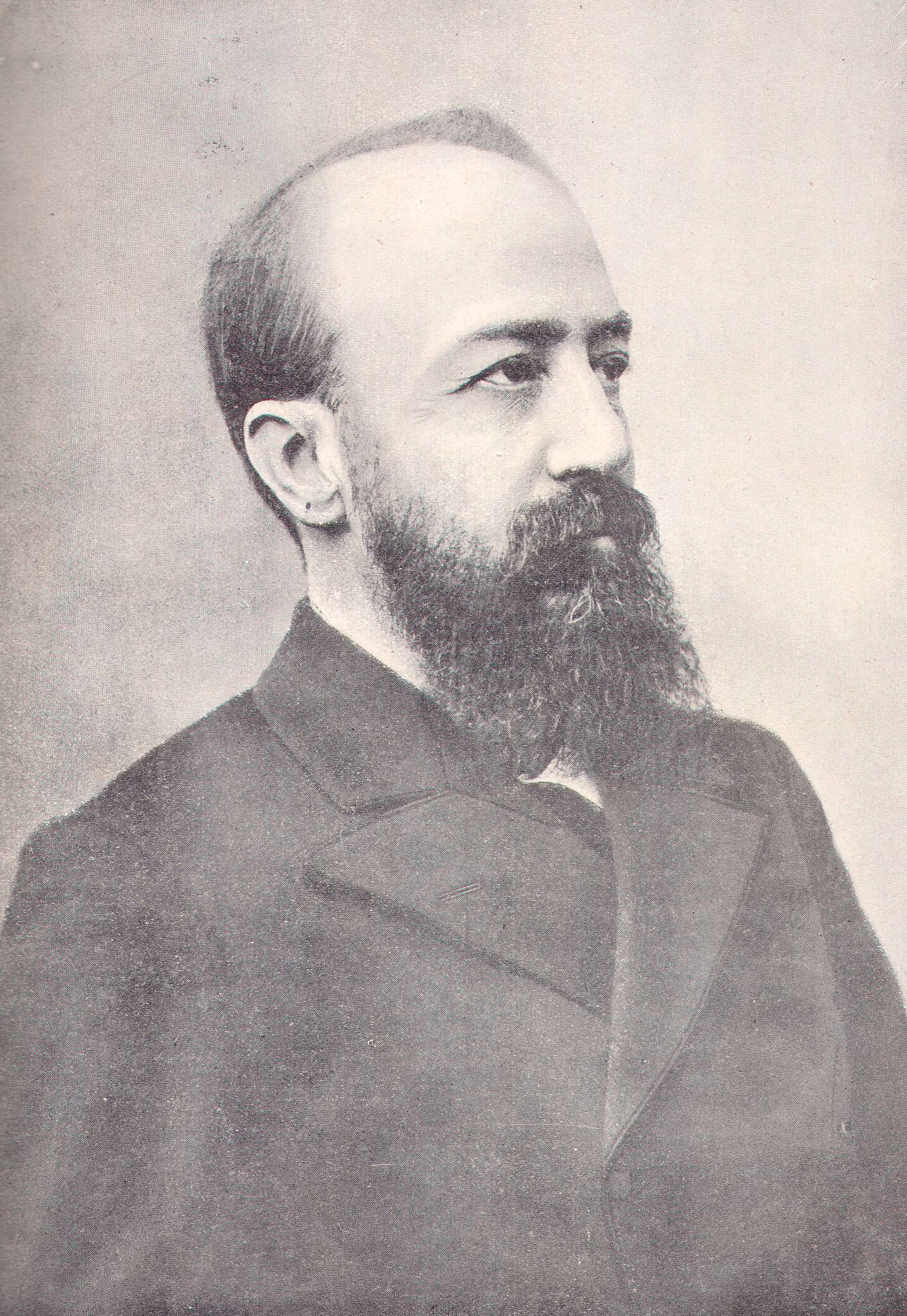

Andrei Nikolaevich Krasnov (Андрея Николаевич Краснов; 27 October 1862 – 19 December 1914) was a Russian botanist who explored the plants of Turkestan, Altai, Nizhny Novgorod, Tian Shan and the Caucasus regions. He was a professor at the University of Kharkov. His major contribution was in phytogeography, identifying combinations of species found in different regions and contributing to the study of global vegetation patterns and their links to the Köppen climate classification.

== Life and work ==
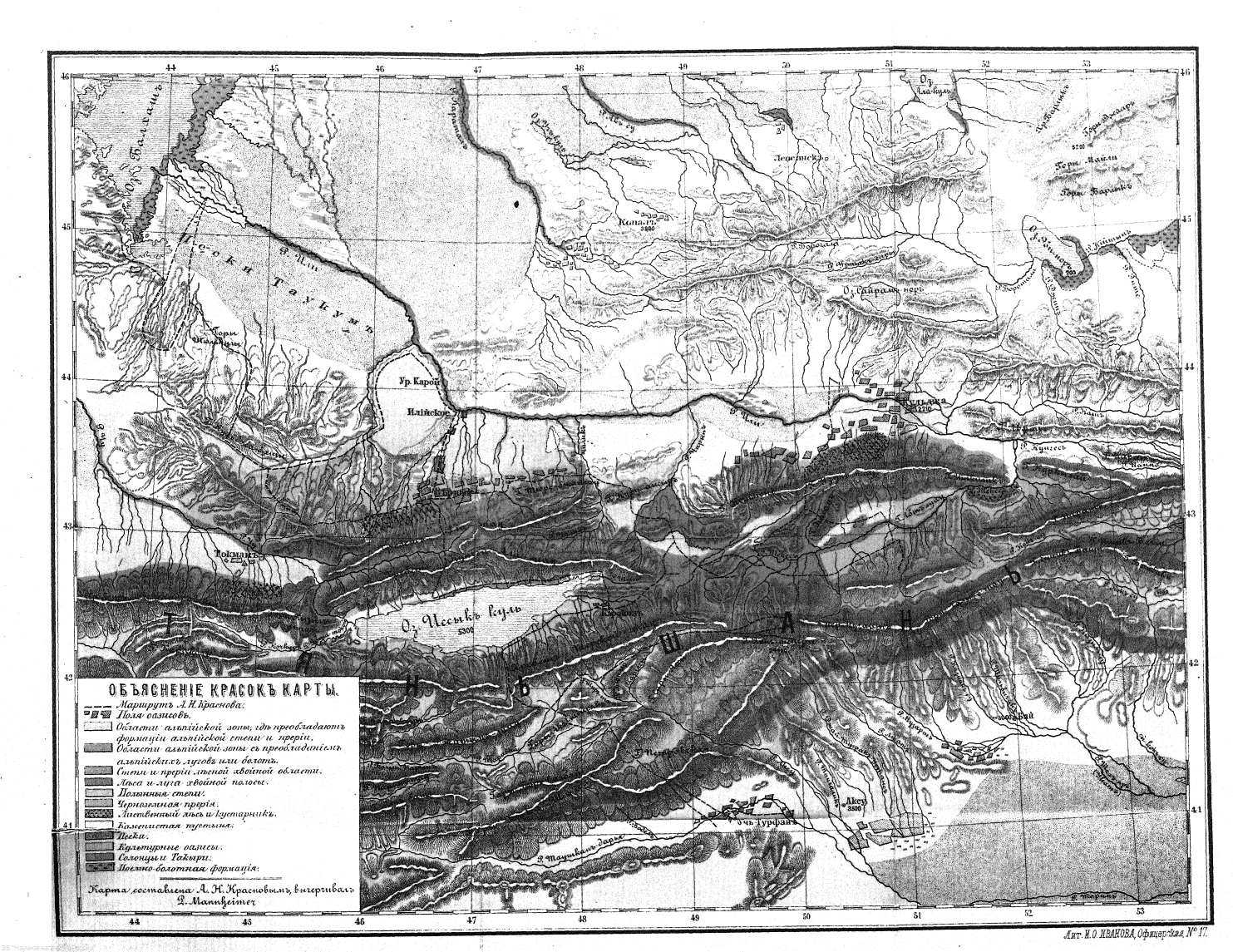
Vegetation map (1888)

Krasnov was born in a Don Cossack family in St. Petersburg. His brother Pyotr became a noted General. He went to the St Petersburg Gymnasium before joining St Petersburg University where he studied under V. V. Dokuchaev and A.N. Beketov. A contemporary was V. I. Vernadsky. He took an interest in geography, soils, and the distributions of plants. In 1883, he joined on an expedition into the Nizhny Novgorod region. This was followed by other regions during which he collected a large number of plant specimens. In 1884 he presented his work on the origin of the Chernozem. He briefly headed the Department of Botany at Kazan University. He was also involved in the introduction of plant species, making use of Australian eucalyptus trees to drain swamps. Krasnov had already begun to examine patterns in the distribution of plants within the Russian steppe in 1888. It was when he began to explore plant introduction that he began to examine climate similarities in greater detail. In 1894 he defended his doctoral dissertation on the grassy steppe regions at Moscow University. In 1912 he left Kharkov University and founded the Batumi Botanical Garden.

Krasnov used the representation F = f1 + f2 + f3 to separate the flora of the Steppe with F being the plants now found and classifying them into f1 - the original Palearctic flora, f2 - old species that have undergone change to current conditions and f3 being new species that have come into the region.

The genus Krasnovia was named after him by M.G. Popov in 1950, and a mountain in the Sakhalin mountains is named after him.
