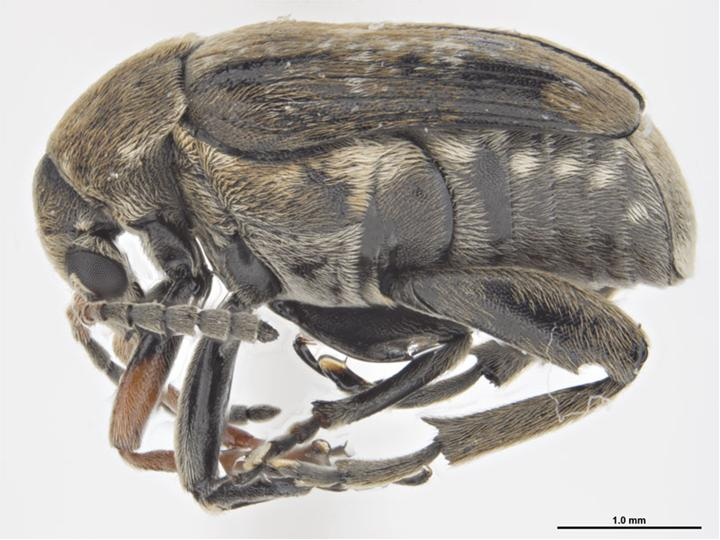
- Enlarged view of a broad bean beetle

Scientific classification
- Kingdom: Animalia
- Phylum: Arthropoda
- Clade: Pancrustacea
- Class: Insecta
- Order: Coleoptera
- Suborder: Polyphaga
- Infraorder: Cucujiformia
- Family: Chrysomelidae
- Genus: Bruchus
- Species: B. rufimanus

Binomial name
- Bruchus rufimanus Boheman, 1833

= Bruchus rufimanus =

Species of beetle

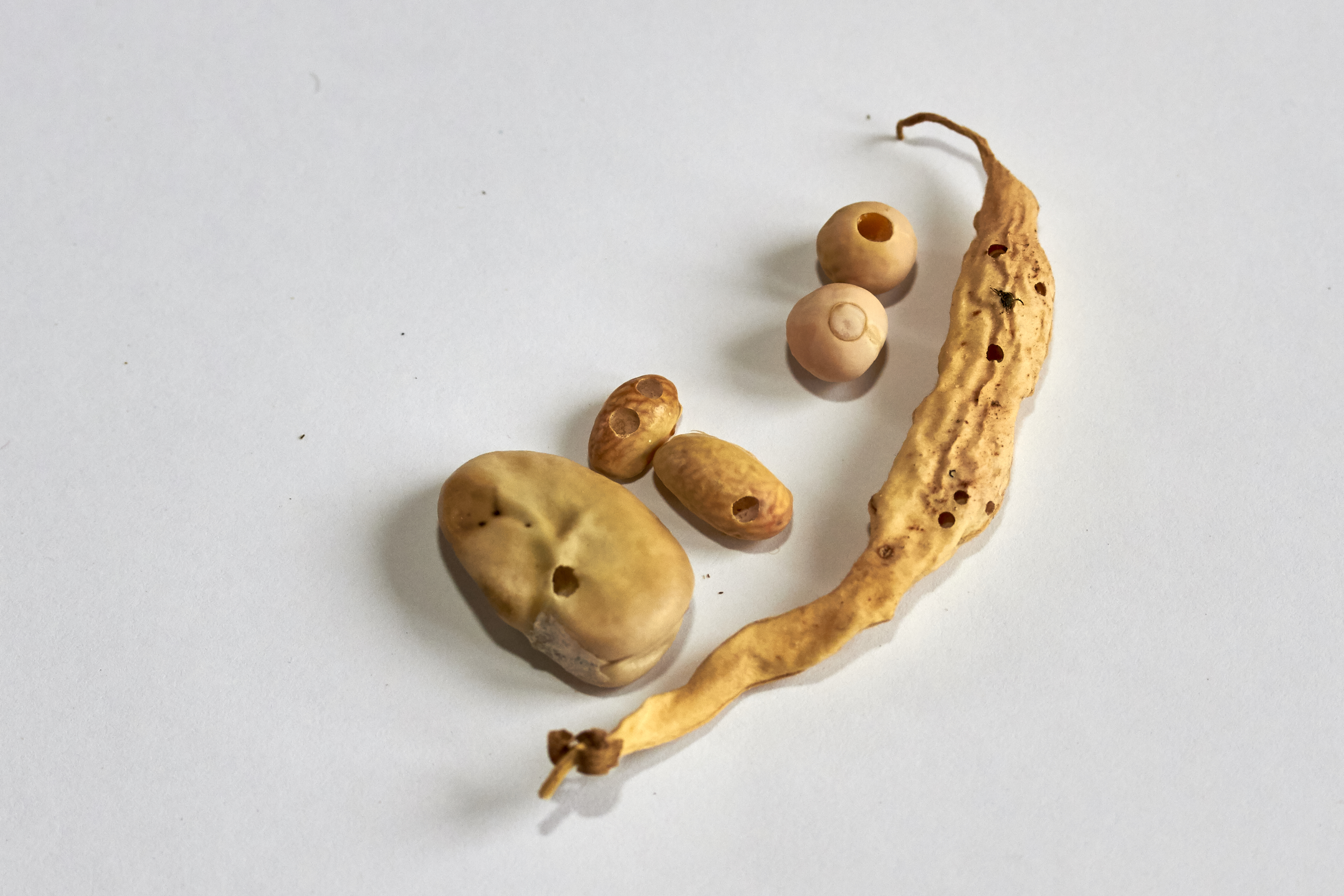
Beans, peas, and bean pod with holes drilled by Bruchus rufimanus

Bruchus rufimanus, commonly known as the broadbean weevil, broadbean beetle, or broadbean seed beetle is a leaf beetle which inhabits crops and fields, as well as some homes. It is a pest of faba beans (Vicia faba L.). The adult beetles feed on pollen, while their larvae tunnel in seeds destroying crops and moving on to new ones once they dry out. The adult beetle, being one of the biggest of its genus, ranges from 3 to 5 mm in length.

== Biology ==
The broadbean beetle, B. rufimanus is univoltine. It reproduces in spring in faba bean crops, lays eggs on the young pods, develops in the growing seeds and overwinters as adults in shelters, or in diapause as larvae or pupae in stored seeds.

=== Overwintering ===
Adults are in reproductive diapause and overwinter in protected sites such as under tree bark, particularly of old, standing trees, hedgerows, lichen, and in forests or leaf litter. In early spring, they can be observed feeding on pollen and nectar of nearby flowers and particularly on Fabaceae and Vicia spp. Some B. rufimanus can survive during winter in larval or pupal diapause inside the seeds and terminate their diapause, finish their post-embryonic growth, and emerge from the seeds after sowing.

=== Field colonization, mobility and sexual maturity ===
Males' sexual maturation is triggered by an increased proportion of light in the photoperiod, such that they are sexually mature when they colonize the field when the crop reaches leaf development. More specifically, a day length of 16h is required for the beetles to terminate their reproductive diapause. An optimal day length of 18h is found to induce diapause termination.

Females are still in reproductive diapause when they colonize the field once crops reach flowering stage and day temperature reaches 20 °C. They become sexually mature in a few days, as a result of both an increased duration of photophase and the ingestion of faba bean pollen and nectar (Tran and Huignard 1993).

Adults are extremely mobile during the day, and find refuge in resting sites in flowers and young leaves at night and early morning. They migrate from crop to crop following flower availability. Field density can vary. In France, numbers are around 20 adults/100 plants at the beginning of the colonization and 150 adults/100 plants at population peak when pressure is high.

Fields near overwintering sites such as woody and herbaceous environment, and storage facilities, present increased risk of B. rufimanus colonization, particularly in areas with high infestation the preceding year.

=== Mating and oviposition ===
Once males and females are both sexually mature, mating is spread over a few weeks. Insects are active when the temperature reaches 20 °C; temperatures above 25 °C are very favorable to B. rufimanus activity in the field, whereas colder temperatures below 15 °C and wet weather limit insect mobility. Once fertilized, female B. rufimanus lay eggs on developing pods of faba beans. Rain, wind, and temperatures below 20 °C put the oviposition process on hold. Eggs are laid predominantly on the lowest parts of the plant. Eggs are small (< 2mm diameter) and white-yellowish. A maximum of ten eggs per pod is observed. Females lay between 50 and 100 eggs. Rain might increase egg mortality.

=== Larval development and adult emergence ===
After about 10 days (1–3 weeks depending on temperatures), larvae hatch and bore directly throughout the pod walls, and develop within the seed. Larvae are thus protected from biological and chemical control. Larval development lasts two to three months. Before entering its pupal stage, the larva cuts a circular cap. After around ten days in the pupal stage, the adult emerges from the seeds. Because mating and oviposition are spread over a few weeks, adults can emerge before or after harvest.

=== Effect on faba beans ===
Although B. rufimanus does not directly affect faba bean yield, it alters the aesthetic quality of the seeds as well as their germination properties and ensuing yield, which is an issue for human consumption and seed markets. A maximum 3% damage threshold is set for seeds targeting the market for human consumption. Damaged seeds (seeds from which adults have emerged) might have lower germination rates with 13% reduced germination observed in the lab, but no difference observed in the field. Yield from infested beans is lower (-45% to -70%) than for healthy ones (Epperlein, 1992). In addition, damaged seeds have increased susceptibility to rust and root diseases.

Additionally, the presence of living insects on seeds are an issue for the export market as no living insects are allowed for export. The presence of beetles in the seeds after harvest thereby decreases faba bean commercial value.

== Management options ==
The larval stages of B. rufimanus occur inside the seeds, and are therefore protected from any control measures, including chemical control. Bruchus rufimanus is most vulnerable at the adult stage. Most control measures have therefore targeted adults, either at colonization stage in the field or at emergence in storage facilities. Control measures have been focused on direct control with insecticides, but restrictions and removal from market due to environmental concerns have increased the need for alternative measures.

=== Monitoring ===
Because of their larval development inside the seeds, which are protected by the pods, most inventorying methods are based on population of B. rufimanus adults in the field or at emergence. Adult population density can be estimated by counts on plants at field colonization. The development of semiochemical attractant trapping systems for both monitoring and pest control has received particular interest in ongoing research on the beetle. Egg density can be estimated on young developing pods (>2 cm) during the oviposition period. Eggs are however small (<1mm length) and green-yellowish, and therefore difficult to observe. In addition, population estimates are difficult to obtain as egg laying is spread over time until 5–10 days after the end of flowering (BBCH 77). After harvest, seed quality can be observed manually and characterized according to pest damage (healthy, with no trace of damage/containing developing larvae/trace of emerged B. rufimanus adult (a hole in the seed). Alternative methods exist to sort the seeds: sorting can be done using differences in seed density due to the presence of the developing larva or of the hole left by the emerged adult, estimation of damaged seeds can be done by tomography analysis. Additionally, the end of larval and pupal diapause and therefore the emergence of B. rufimanus can be induced via a solution of NaOCl and chinosol in 7 days at 30 °C, allowing the estimation of an overall infestation rate.

=== Control methods ===
==== Chemical control ====
In Europe, pyrethroids and neonicotinoids have been used against B. rufimanus. Because of the faba bean crop biology and its attraction to pollinators at flowering stage, restrictions on pesticides uses have been introduced in Europe. It is particularly advised to spray in absence of pollinators in the early morning and evening. In addition, due to B. rufimanus' biology, a temperature threshold combined with crop development stage can be used to increase the success of chemical treatments. Adult B. rufimanus activity increases with temperature, so that treatment efficiency might increase when maximum day temperatures are over 20°C during four consecutive days after treatment (Arvalis, 2016). The end of blooming indicates the end of adult activity in the field. This stage is therefore a threshold marking the end of insecticide application and occurs no later than five days after last blooming. Forecasting systems (Bruchi-LIS, Arvalis, France and BruchidCast, Syngenta, UK) have been developed to optimize insecticide applications based on temperature and crop stage.

==== Other methods ====
- Traps based on semiochemical attractants are being developed targeting adults at field colonization.
- Recent work has highlighted the potential of entomopathogenic fungi to control B. rufimanus.
- Recent work has highlighted the repellent and insecticidal properties of botanical oils against B. rufimanus and their potential to be used in pest management.

=== Direct control in storage facilities ===
Although the measures taken in storage facilities do not decrease the proportion of damaged seeds, they limit the densities of emerging insects and therefore the pressure for the coming year. Such measures will be especially efficient in storage as most B. rufimanus have then not yet emerged and are still developing in the seeds. Early harvest could therefore be recommended for best control measures in storage facilities.

- Warm air : Exposition of seeds to warm air (50 to 70°C, depending on duration) kills B. rufimanus developing into the seeds at the same time it lowers water content. However, warmth can decrease germination rates of the seeds and degrade the visual aspect and the protein content of the seeds, which would be problematic for the seed market.
- Fumigation and insecticide use: Fumigants and insecticides (e.g., K-Obiol® ULV 6 (Pyrethroid, Bayer, Germany), in France) can be used against B. rufimanus in storage facilities. Fumigation requires tightly sealed storage facilities.
- Trapping of newly emerged insects: By sealing the storage facilities, newly emerged adults from seeds could be prevented from escaping to their overwintering sites to decrease the pest pressure at the next season. B. rufimanus could then be trapped and later killed, e.g., by fire. Healthy and damaged seeds can be sorted using an optic sorter. Additionally, if storage is extended over two years, this enables all developing B. rufimanus to emerge before sowing and therefore avoids emergence in the field from contaminated seeds.

=== Preventive control methods ===
The pressure from B. rufimanus seems unaffected by management practices and cultivar, although little data is available. Because B. rufimanus biology is highly linked to crop development and climatic conditions, pest damage and pressure the next year can vary according to sowing and harvesting date. In addition, sanitation can help to decrease the source of B. rufimanus in production areas.

=== Biological control ===
Parasitoids have been found to parasitize B. rufimanus eggs: Chremylus rubiginosus and Triaspis thoracicus (family: Braconidae), and Dinarmus acutus (family: Pteromalidae). Their larvae develop into B. rufimanus larvae and adults emerge from the seed, leaving a small emergence hole in the seed (smaller than for B. rufimanus). Generalist predators on faba bean leaves, such as spiders, might feed on B. rufimanus eggs and contribute to their biological control, although no data was found on their potential impact on the population size or growth.
