= Groundnut =

Groundnut may refer to:

- Seeds that ripen underground, of the following plants, all in the Faboideae subfamily of the legumes:
  - Arachis hypogaea, the peanut
  - Arachis villosulicarpa, a perennial peanut species
  - Vigna subterranea, the Bambara groundnut
  - Macrotyloma geocarpum, the Hausa groundnut
- Roots and tubers:
  - Apios americana, the American groundnut or potato-bean
  - Conopodium majus, called the kippernut among many other names
  - Panax trifolius, or dwarf ginseng

Production of groundnuts

Groundnuts yield

Yearly per capita supply of groundnuts

== See also ==
- Ground nuts, nuts subjected to grinding
- Earthnut (disambiguation)
- Tanganyika groundnut scheme
