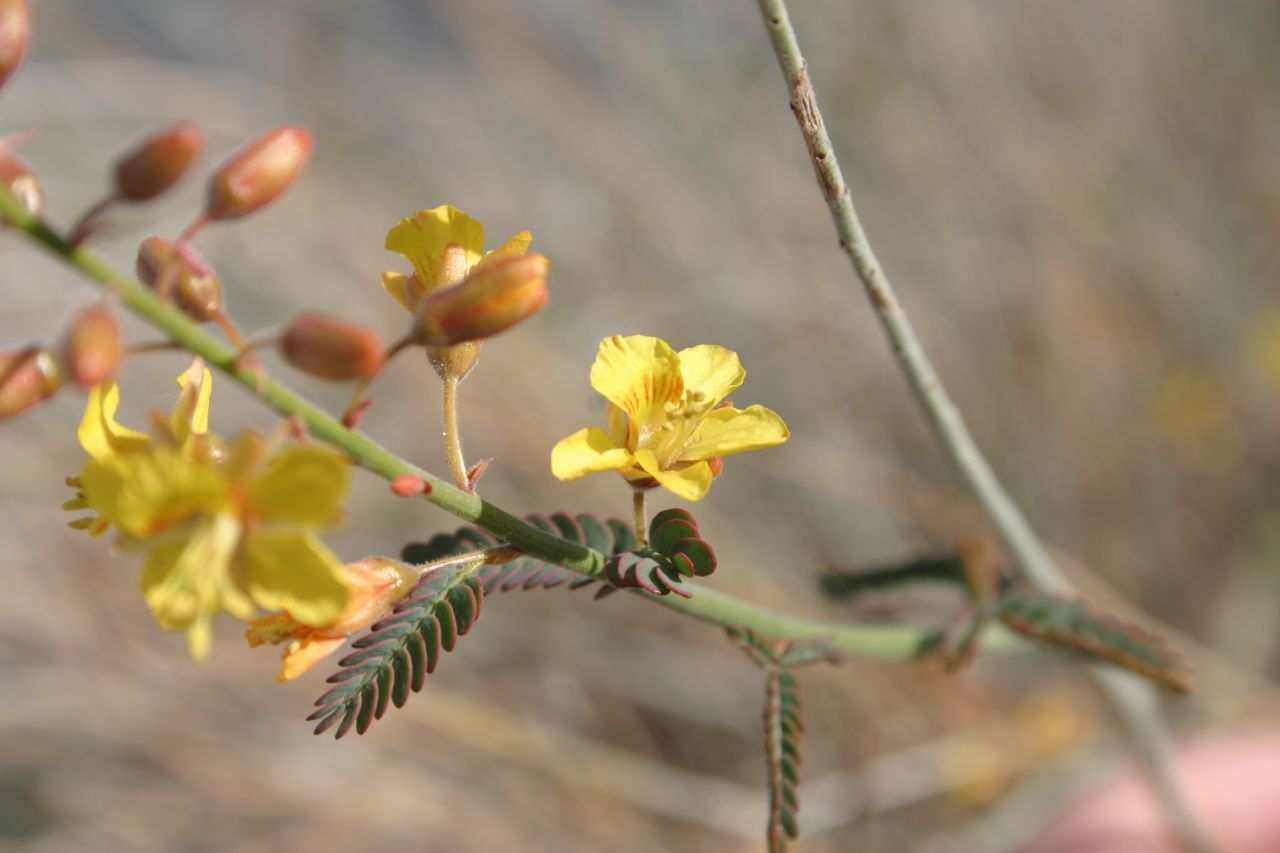

Scientific classification
- Kingdom: Plantae
- Clade: Tracheophytes
- Clade: Angiosperms
- Clade: Eudicots
- Clade: Rosids
- Order: Fabales
- Family: Fabaceae
- Subfamily: Caesalpinioideae
- Genus: Hoffmannseggia
- Species: H. microphylla

Binomial name
- Hoffmannseggia microphylla Torr.

Synonyms
- Caesalpinia virgata

= Hoffmannseggia microphylla =

Species of legume

Hoffmannseggia microphylla (syn. Caesalpinia virgata) is a species of flowering plant in the legume family known by the common name wand holdback. It is native to the southwestern United States and Baja California and grows in gullies, canyons, slopes and primarily creosote bush scrub.

It is a perennial shrub that grows up to 6 ft (1.8 m) tall. The stems are hairy and green and have few leaves for most of the year. Before the leaves fall, they appear as twigs lined with pairs of small oval-shaped leaflets.

The shrub flowers in scattered raceme inflorescences of red-streaked yellow flowers which age to full red. The fruit is a sickle-shaped dehiscent legume pod up to 2.5 centimeters long. It is bumpy with glands and slightly hairy.
