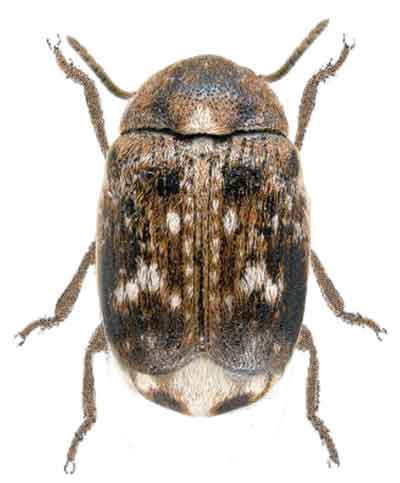

Scientific classification
- Kingdom: Animalia
- Phylum: Arthropoda
- Class: Insecta
- Order: Coleoptera
- Suborder: Polyphaga
- Infraorder: Cucujiformia
- Family: Chrysomelidae
- Genus: Bruchus
- Species: B. brachialis

Binomial name
- Bruchus brachialis Fahraeus, 1839

= Bruchus brachialis =

Species of beetle

Bruchus brachialis, the vetch bruchid, is a species of leaf beetle in the family Chrysomelidae. It is found in Europe & Northern Asia (excluding China) and North America.

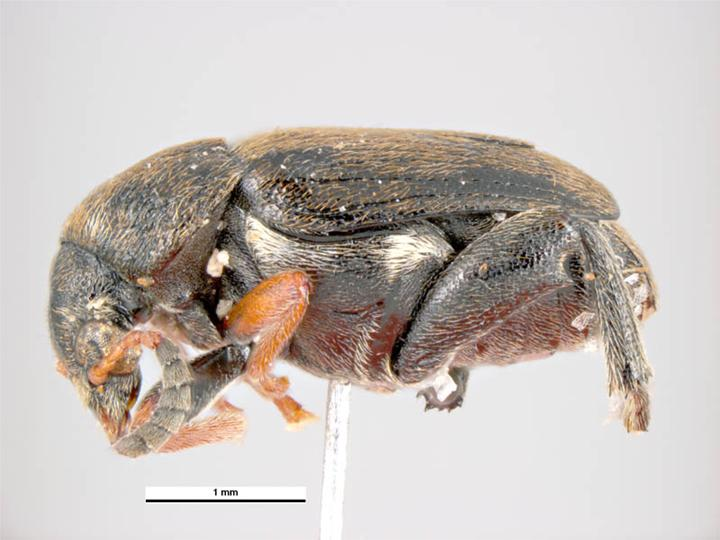
Vetch bruchid, Bruchus brachialis
