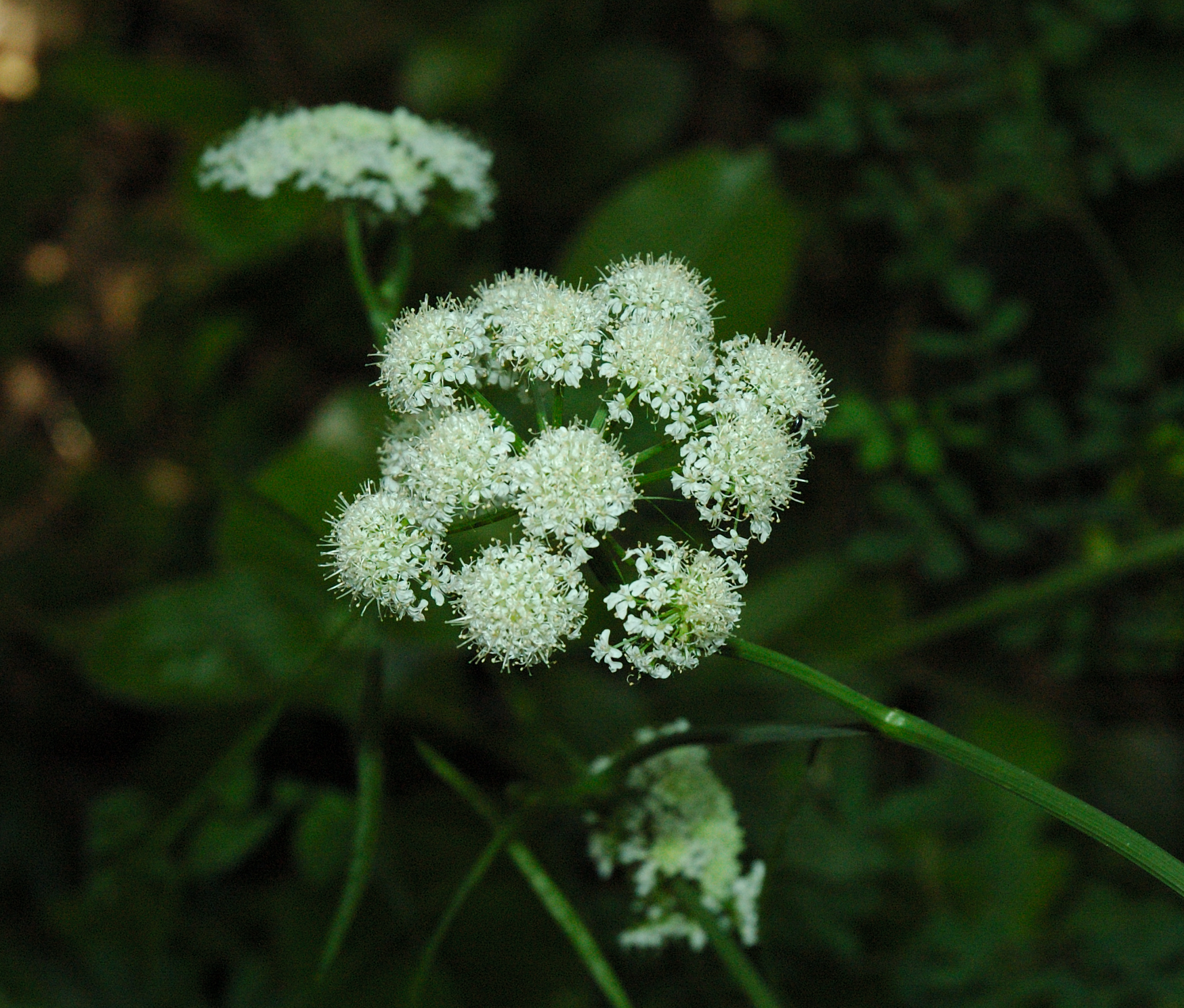

Scientific classification
- Kingdom: Plantae
- Clade: Tracheophytes
- Clade: Angiosperms
- Clade: Eudicots
- Clade: Asterids
- Order: Apiales
- Family: Apiaceae
- Genus: Bunium
- Species: B. nothum

Binomial name
- Bunium nothum (C.B.Clarke) P.K.Mukh.

Synonyms
- Carum nothum C.B.Clarke

= Bunium nothum =

Species of flowering plant

Bunium nothum is a species of flowering plant in the family Apiaceae. It is a tuberous geophyte native to the Sri Lanka and the Western Ghats of western India.

== Description ==
A perennial herb grows erect, with either branched or unbranched stems, typically reaching up to 30 cm in height. The plant is slender, rigid, glabrous, and features tuberous roots. Tubers are globose, measuring 1–1.7 cm in diameter, with a brownish to whitish-brown coloration. Leaves are arranged in a basal rosette and alternate along the stem. Leaf blades are tri-pinnately decompound, measuring 2–8 cm by 1.5–3.5 cm, and have a broad-sheathing base. Leaf divisions are 0.5–4.5 mm by 0.5–1.5 mm, with entire margins and acute apices. The midvein is prominent and may be channelled on the upper surface. Ultimate leaf divisions are linear, three-parted or lobed, 5–10 mm by 0.5–1 mm.

The inflorescence is a compound or decompound umbel, terminal, approximately 9 cm across. Peduncles may be purplish, greenish, or rarely whitish, 1.5–12.5 cm long, slender or rigid, ribbed or angled, and may stand erect or exhibit curvature. Flowers are perfect, polygamous or bisexual, pentamerous, and pedicellate, measuring 1.5–2.2 mm by 1.2–1.4 mm. The involucral bracts are usually five in number, but may sometimes be three, four, or six. They are variable in shape: oblong-lanceolate, linear-lanceolate, or oblanceolate, 5–2 mm by 2.5–5.5 mm, with entire margins, and apices that are acute or obtuse. Their coloration is typically greenish, but may rarely be purplish or pinkish. The bracts are prominently three-veined, slightly curved at the middle, reflexed, and persistent.
