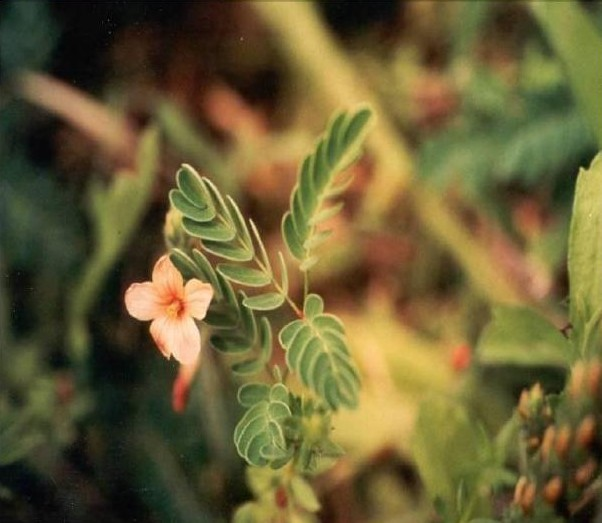

Conservation status
- Critically Imperiled (NatureServe)

Scientific classification
- Kingdom: Plantae
- Clade: Tracheophytes
- Clade: Angiosperms
- Clade: Eudicots
- Clade: Rosids
- Order: Fabales
- Family: Fabaceae
- Subfamily: Caesalpinioideae
- Genus: Hoffmannseggia
- Species: H. tenella

Binomial name
- Hoffmannseggia tenella Tharp & L.O.Williams

= Hoffmannseggia tenella =

Species of legume

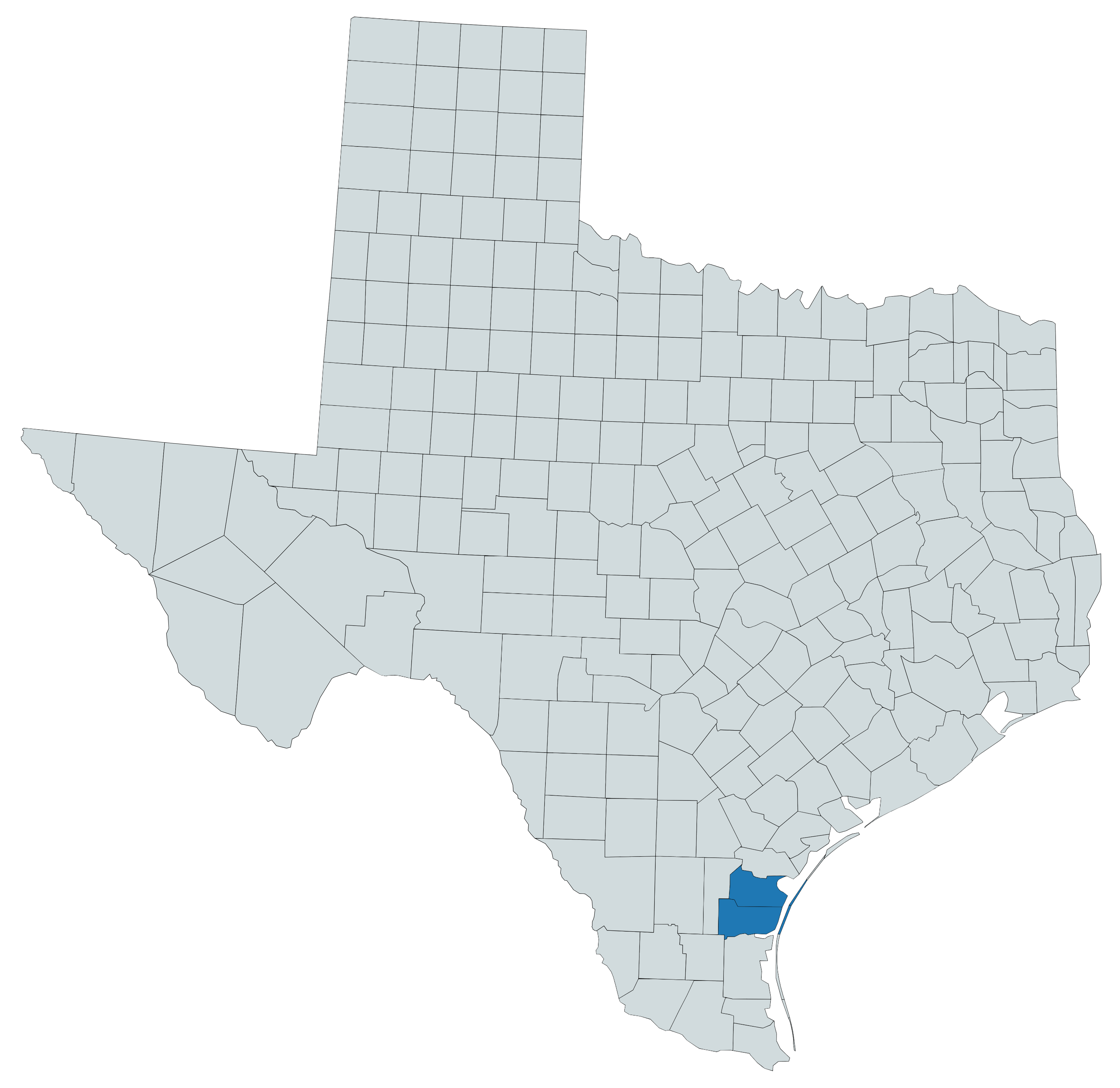
Range of Hoffmannseggia tenella

Hoffmannseggia tenella is a rare species of flowering plant in the legume family known by the common name slender rushpea. It is endemic to Texas, where it is known from only two counties. It persists in small remnants of its gulf coastal prairie habitat. It is a federally listed endangered species of the United States.

This is a small perennial herb growing up to 15 centimeters tall from a woody taproot. It may grow in colonies. The plant has leaves up to 6 centimeters long which are made up of 5 to 7 pairs of leaflets. The flowers have petals about half a centimeter long in shades of yellowish pink, orange, coral, or salmon. The blooming season is in March through June, and more blooming may occur later if there is adequate rainfall. The fruit is a flat, straight legume pod just over a centimeter long.

This plant is known only from Nueces and Kleberg Counties in Texas. The natural habitat of this species is a type of coastal shortgrass prairie dominated by native grasses such as buffalograss (Buchloe dactyloides), Texas wintergrass (Stipa leucotrica), and Texas grama (Bouteloua rigidiseta). Other plants in the habitat include huisache (Acacia farnesiana), huisachillo (Acacia schaffneri), spiny hackberry (Celtis laevigata), brasil (Condalia hookeri), retama (Parkinsonia aculeata), lotebush (Ziziphus obtusifolia), tasajillo (Opuntia leptocaulis), and Engelmann's prickly pear (Opuntia engelmannii). The rushpea sometimes grows alongside the South Texas ambrosia (Ambrosia cheiranthifolia), another endangered species.

It has a patchy distribution in remaining strips of appropriate habitat, occurring in just 15% of its former range. Most of its habitat has been converted to agricultural use as cropland and pastures. The land has also been invaded by non-native plant species that compete with the rare plant. The worst offender is Kleberg bluestem (Dichanthium annulatum), a large grass. It grows very quickly and tall, shading out the slender rushpea. The dense habit of the grass may hold in heat and humidity, which foster the growth of fungi on the seedlings of the rushpea. It drains nutrients and water from the soil, and it may produce allelopathic substances that discourage growth of the rushpea.
