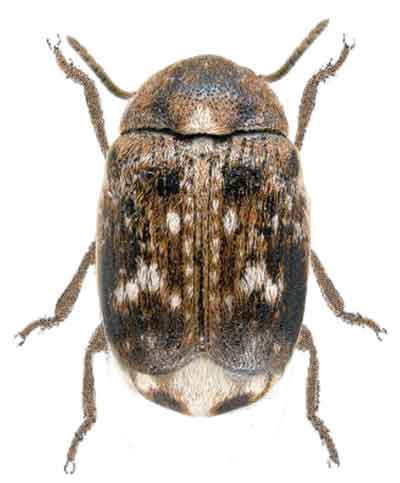
- Bruchus brachialis

Scientific classification
- Kingdom: Animalia
- Phylum: Arthropoda
- Clade: Pancrustacea
- Class: Insecta
- Order: Coleoptera
- Suborder: Polyphaga
- Infraorder: Cucujiformia
- Family: Chrysomelidae
- Subfamily: Bruchinae
- Tribe: Bruchini
- Genus: Bruchus; Linnaeus, 1767

Species
- see text

= Bruchus =

Genus of beetles

Bruchus is a genus of beetles in the leaf beetle family, Chrysomelidae. They are distributed mainly in the Palearctic, especially in Europe. Several occur in other parts of the world, such as North America, Africa, and Australia, as introduced species. Several species are notorious agricultural pests.

The genus is part of the subfamily Bruchinae. Members of the subfamily are known commonly as bean weevils. Many authors prefer to call them seed-beetles or bean beetles, because they are not true weevils, and because in most species, the larvae develop inside seeds, particularly beans. Because Bruchinae was known as the family Bruchidae until the 1990s, they are sometimes still called bruchid beetles.

== Description ==
The genus Bruchus is well-defined by a number of characters, such as the shape of the pronotum, an arrangement of spines or plates on the tibia of the middle leg of the male, and the unique morphology of the male genitalia. The latter are slender and elongated, and the eighth abdominal sternite in particular is large and sclerotized, "with a characteristic boomerang shape". This part of the genitalia has been called the "urosternite", but other authors suggest the term "ventral plate" is more appropriate. The robust ventral plate of Bruchus helps distinguish the genus from other seed-beetles, which tend to have vestigial or lobe-like ventral plates. The ventral plate is useful in identification because each species seems to have a distinctive shape to it, and it does not vary among individuals of one species.

In general, these beetles have black bodies with patterns of white or yellow setae. Some species have red or red-orange legs. The elytra are marked with straight lines.

== Biology ==
Bruchus are specialists, feeding and developing almost exclusively on plants of the legume tribe Fabeae (Vicieae), which includes peas, sweet peas, lentils, and vetches. Examples include cow vetch (Vicia cracca), which is attacked by at least nine Bruchus species, common vetch (Vicia sativa), which is host to five recorded species, and meadow vetchling (Lathyrus pratensis) and tuberous pea (Lathyrus tuberosus), which are each attacked by four species. Some Bruchus species are monophagous, living on just one host plant species.

Some species of Lathyrus have an antipredator adaptation that may have evolved in response to Bruchus and other seed-beetles. The fruit pods develop a callus when attacked, by the beetle, and this growth is mediated by bruchins, compounds so far known only from seed-beetles.

These beetles are univoltine, producing one generation per year. The female lays eggs on the fruit pod of its host legume in spring and summer, and the larva enters a seed to develop. The adult emerges, but remains in diapause through fall and winter, waiting until spring to reproduce.

== Impacts ==
Among the major agricultural pests in the genus are B. lentis on lentils, B. pisorum on peas, and B. rufimanus on fava beans. Bruchus species are among the worst pests of lentils, in one study causing a 30% loss of a crop. While many seed-beetles are pests of stored bean supplies, Bruchus species do not reproduce in postharvest dry bean stores, just in beans on the plant in the field.

One species has proved more useful. B. rufipes was found inside jars of Spanish vetchling (Lathyrus clymenum) seeds in the ruins of Akrotiri, a settlement on the island of Santorini destroyed in the Minoan eruption of its volcano. The inhabitants used the vetchling seeds for food. Charred remains of B. rufipes, a pest of the plant, were recovered from the jars and the chitin was successfully radiocarbon dated, providing evidence that the date of the eruption was between 1744 and 1538 BC.

== Systematics ==
Linnaeus erected the genus, and initially it contained almost all the known species of seed-beetles. The genus was divided over time and many species were distributed into new genera. Some authors, though, continued to classify new seed-beetles in Bruchus, creating a disorganized taxon full of species quite obviously unrelated to one another. Today, after revisions, the circumscription of Bruchus is relatively clear.

Phylogenetic analyses have shown that the genus as it is now defined is monophyletic, but also that two of the seven groups in the genus are "potentially paraphyletic".

As of 2008, about 36 species are in the genus.

Species include:

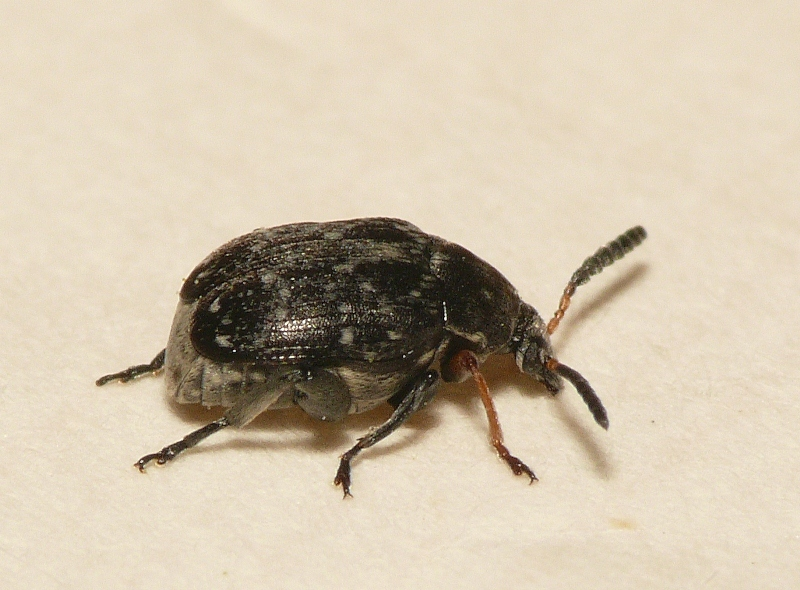
Bruchus atomarius

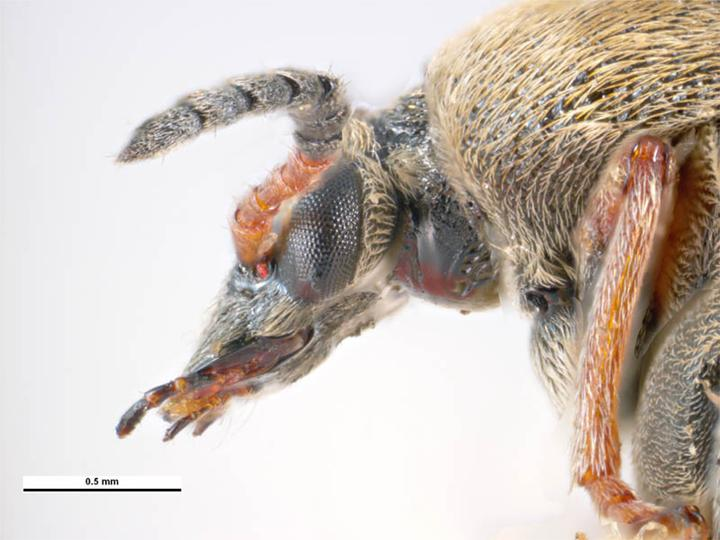
Bruchus rufimanus

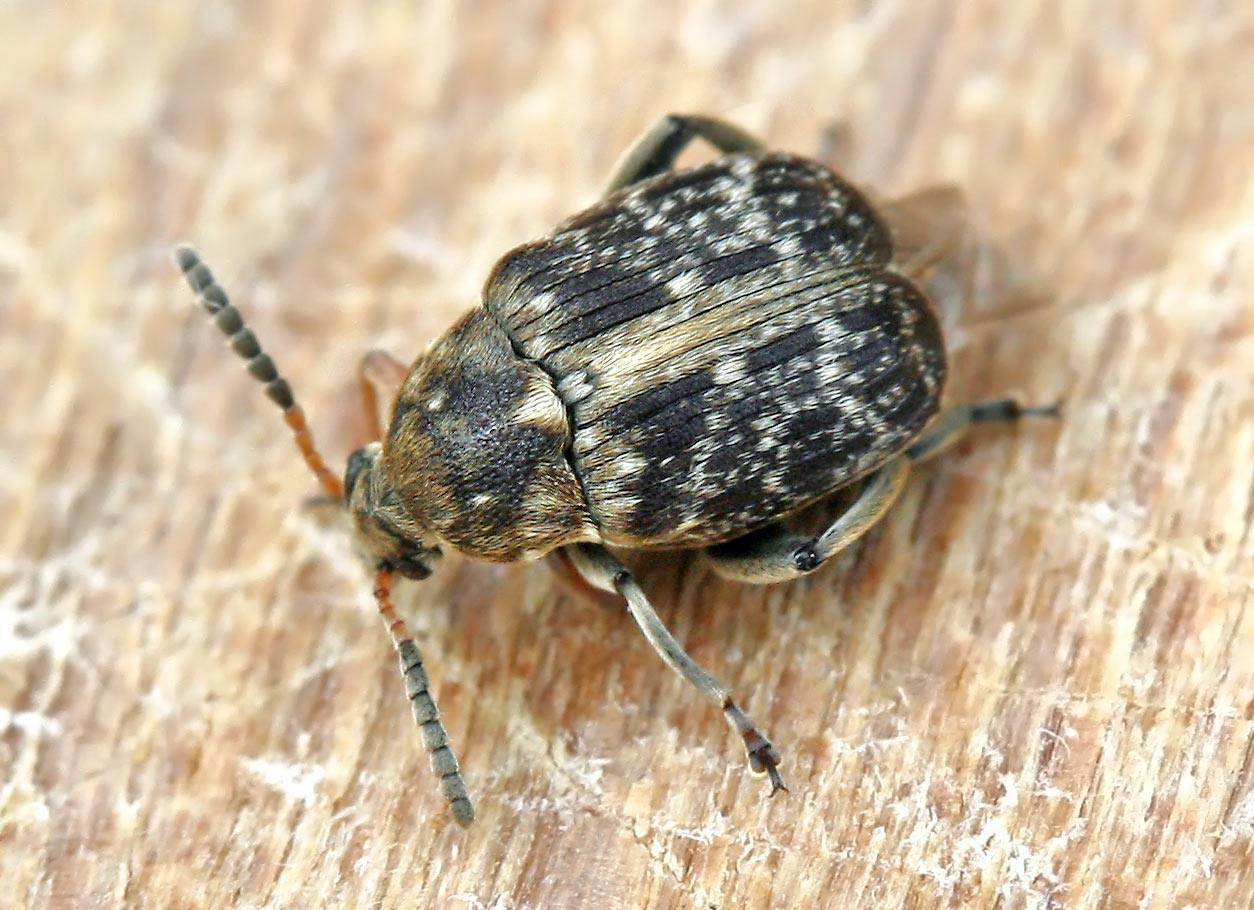
Bruchus affinis

- Bruchus affinis
- Bruchus altaicus
- Bruchus anatolicus
- Bruchus atomarius
- Bruchus brachialis
- Bruchus brisouti
- Bruchus canariensis
- Bruchus dentipes
- Bruchus emarginatus
- Bruchus ervi
- Bruchus griseomaculatus
- Bruchus hamatus
- Bruchus hierroensis
- Bruchus ibericus
- Bruchus laticollis
- Bruchus lends
- Bruchus libanensis
- Bruchus loti
- Bruchus lugubris
- Bruchus luteicornis
- Bruchus mirabilicollis
- Bruchus mulkaki
- Bruchus occidentalis
- Bruchus pavlovskii
- Bruchus perezi
- Bruchus pisorum
- Bruchus rufimanus
- Bruchus rufipes
- Bruchus sibiricus
- Bruchus signaticornis
- Bruchus tetragonus
- Bruchus tristiculus
- Bruchus tristis
- Bruchus ulicis
- Bruchus venustus
- Bruchus viciae
