= Krasnovia =

Scientific classification
- Kingdom: Plantae
- Clade: Tracheophytes
- Clade: Angiosperms
- Clade: Eudicots
- Clade: Asterids
- Order: Apiales
- Family: Apiaceae
- Subfamily: Apioideae
- Tribe: Scandiceae
- Subtribe: Scandicinae
- Genus: Krasnovia; Popov ex Schischk.
- Species: K. longiloba

Binomial name
- Krasnovia longiloba (Kar. & Kir.) Popov ex Schischk.

Synonyms
- Chaerophyllum longilobum (Kar. & Kir.) O.Fedtsch. & B.Fedtsch.; Chaerophyllum sphallerocarpus Kar. & Kir., nom. illeg.; Conopodium longilobum (Kar. & Kir.) Koso-Pol.; Kozlovia longiloba (Kar. & Kir.) Spalik & S.R.Downie; Sphallerocarpus longilobus Kar. & Kir.

Genus of plants

Krasnovia is a monotypic genus of flowering plant in the family Apiaceae. Its only described species is Krasnovia longiloba, native to Kazakhstan, Kyrgyzstan and Xinjiang. The genus was first described in 1950, and was named after Andrei Krasnov by M.G. Popov. The species was first described in 1842 as Sphallerocarpus longilobus.

A 2001 study using ribosomal DNA found that Neoconopodium, Krasnovia and Kozlovia were closely related within tribe Scandiceae subtribe Scandicinae, and proposed that they be combined into Kozlovia. As of December 2022, this proposal had been accepted by the Germplasm Resources Information Network, but not by Plants of the World Online.
