= Bunium elegans =

Scientific classification
- Kingdom: Plantae
- Clade: Tracheophytes
- Clade: Angiosperms
- Clade: Eudicots
- Clade: Asterids
- Order: Apiales
- Family: Apiaceae
- Genus: Bunium
- Species: B. elegans

Binomial name
- Bunium elegans (Fenzl) Freyn, 1892

Synonyms
- Bunium elegans var. involucratum Saya; Bunium elegans var. latilobum Saya; Bunium elegans var. pachypus Saya; Bunium falcarioides Boiss. & Buhse; Bunium paucifolium var. brevipes (Freyn & Sint.) Hedge & Lamond; Bunium simplex (K.Koch) Klyuikov; Carum elegans Fenzl; Carum falcarioides Boiss. & Buhse; Carum noeanum Boiss.; Carum paucifolium DC.; Carum purpurascens Boiss.

Species of flowering plant

Bunium elegans is a species of flowering plant in the family Apiaceae found in Syria and Lebanon. A specimen is kept at the Muséum National d'Histoire Naturelle in Paris. The plant contains essential oils.
