= Bunium luristanicum =

Scientific classification
- Kingdom: Plantae
- Clade: Tracheophytes
- Clade: Angiosperms
- Clade: Eudicots
- Clade: Asterids
- Order: Apiales
- Family: Apiaceae
- Genus: Bunium
- Species: B. luristanicum

Binomial name
- Bunium luristanicum Rech.f.

Species of flowering plant

Bunium luristanicum is a species of flowering plant in the family Apiaceae described by Karl Heinz Rechinger. Bunium luristanicum is placed in the family Apiaceae. For this species, no subspecies are listed in the Catalogue of Life. It is found in western and southwestern Iran.
