= Kozlovia =

Scientific classification
- Kingdom: Plantae
- Clade: Tracheophytes
- Clade: Angiosperms
- Clade: Eudicots
- Clade: Asterids
- Order: Apiales
- Family: Apiaceae
- Subfamily: Apioideae
- Tribe: Scandiceae
- Subtribe: Scandicinae
- Genus: Kozlovia; Lipsky

Species
- See text.

Synonyms
- Albertia Regel & Schmalh.

Genus of flowering plants

Kozlovia is a genus of flowering plants belonging to the family Apiaceae.

Its native range is Afghanistan to Central Asia (Kyrgyzstan, Tajikistan, Turkmenistan and Uzbekistan) and Pakistan.

== Taxonomy ==
The genus name Kozlovia is in honour of Pyotr Kozlov (1863–1935), a Russian and Soviet traveller and explorer who continued the studies of Nikolai Przhevalsky in Mongolia and Tibet. The genus was first described in 1904 by the botanist Vladimir Ippolitovich Lipsky.

A 2001 study using ribosomal DNA found that Neoconopodium, Krasnovia and Kozlovia were closely related within tribe Scandiceae subtribe Scandicinae, and proposed that they be combined into Kozlovia. As of December 2022, this proposal had been accepted by the Germplasm Resources Information Network, but not by Plants of the World Online.

=== Species ===
Known species, according to Kew:

- Kozlovia laseroides (Hedge & Lamond) Spalik & S.R.Downie
- Kozlovia paleacea (Regel & Schmalh.) Lipsky
