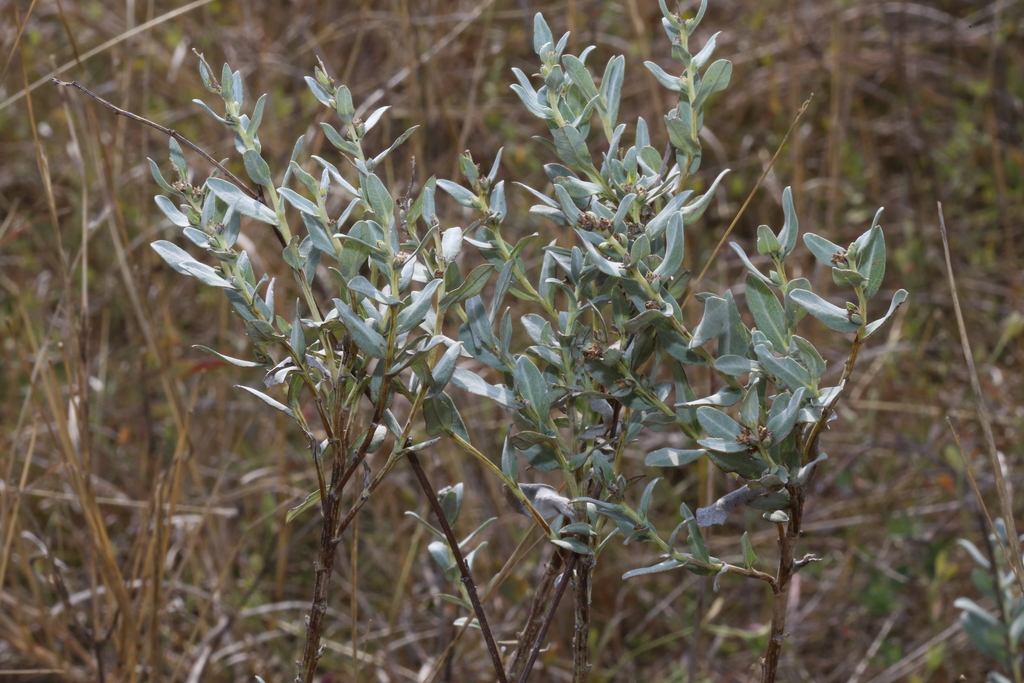
- Ambrosia cheiranthifolia in Nueces County, Texas

Conservation status
- Imperiled (NatureServe)

Scientific classification
- Kingdom: Plantae
- Clade: Embryophytes
- Clade: Tracheophytes
- Clade: Spermatophytes
- Clade: Angiosperms
- Clade: Eudicots
- Clade: Asterids
- Order: Asterales
- Family: Asteraceae
- Tribe: Heliantheae
- Genus: Ambrosia
- Species: A. cheiranthifolia

Binomial name
- Ambrosia cheiranthifolia A.Gray

= Ambrosia cheiranthifolia =

Species of flowering plant

Ambrosia cheiranthifolia is a rare species of flowering plant known by the common names South Texas ambrosia and Rio Grande ragweed. It is native to the coast of South Texas and the Mexican states of Tamaulipas and Coahuila. It occurs in coastal prairie, grassland, and mesquite shrubland habitat. It has declined because its native habitat has been cleared for development, with remaining open savanna invaded by non-native grasses such as buffelgrass (Cenchrus ciliaris). Today there are perhaps 20 populations remaining, but some of these may have very few genetic individuals because the species is clonal, with many cloned plants attached by one rhizome. It is not certain that the plant still exists in Mexico. This is a federally listed endangered species of the United States.

Ambrosia Cheiranthifolia is a rhizomatous perennial herb growing erect to a maximum height around 40 centimeters. Several clones usually grow in a dense patch. The stems and herbage are silvery green with a coating of rough gray hairs. The oblong leaves are 3 to 7 centimeters long and oppositely arranged on the lower plant but alternate on the upper stems. The inflorescence contains staminate flower heads in clusters with a few pistillate heads in leaf axils below the clusters.

This plant sometimes occurs alongside slender rush-pea (Hoffmannseggia tenella), another endangered species.
