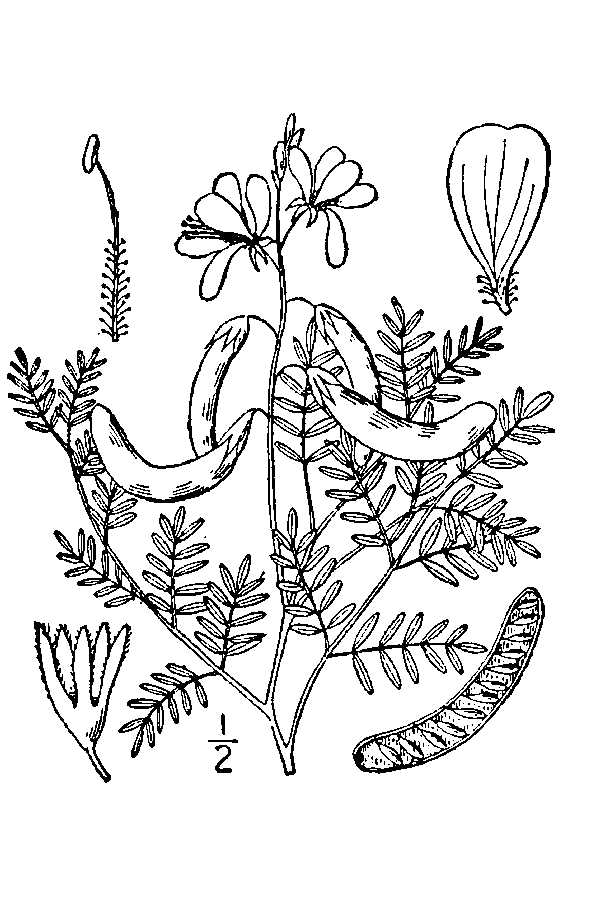
- Hoffmannseggia glauca

Scientific classification
- Kingdom: Plantae
- Clade: Tracheophytes
- Clade: Angiosperms
- Clade: Eudicots
- Clade: Rosids
- Order: Fabales
- Family: Fabaceae
- Subfamily: Caesalpinioideae
- Tribe: Caesalpinieae
- Genus: Hoffmannseggia; Cav. (1798), nom. cons.

Type species
- Hoffmannseggia glauca (Ortega) Eifert.

Species
- See text

Synonyms
- Hoffmanseggia Cav., orth. var.; Hoffmannsegia orth. var.; Larrea Ortega (1797), nom. rej.; Moparia Britton & Rose (1930)

= Hoffmannseggia =

Genus of legumes

Hoffmannseggia is a genus of flowering plants in the pea family, Fabaceae, known generally as rushpeas. These are pod-bearing herbs and subshrubs native to the Americas. In North America they range from California and Nebraska to southern Mexico, and from Colombia, Ecuador, and Peru to southern Argentina and Chile in South America. The generic name honors Johann Centurius, Count of Hoffmannsegg, a nineteenth-century German nobleman and botanist.

== Species ==
Hoffmannseggia comprises the following species:

- Hoffmannseggia aphylla (Phil.) G.P.Lewis & Sotuyo
- Hoffmannseggia arequipensis Ulibarri
- Hoffmannseggia doelli Phil.
  - subsp. argentina Ulibarri
  - subsp. doellii Phil.
- Hoffmannseggia drepanocarpa A.Gray — sicklepod holdback
- Hoffmannseggia drummondii Torr. & A.Gray — dwarf nicker
- Hoffmannseggia erecta Phil.
- Hoffmannseggia eremophila (Phil.) Burkart ex Ulibarri
- Hoffmannseggia glauca (Ortega) Eifert—Indian rushpea, pig-nut, hog potato
- Hoffmannseggia humilis (M.Martens & Galeotti) Hemsl.
- Hoffmannseggia intricata Brandegee
- Hoffmannseggia microphylla Torr.—wand holdback
- Hoffmannseggia minor (Phil.) Ulibarri
- Hoffmannseggia miranda Sandwith
- Hoffmannseggia oxycarpa Benth.—sharppod rushpea
  - subsp. arida (Rose) B. B. Simpson
  - subsp. oxycarpa Benth.
- Hoffmannseggia peninsularis (Britton) Wiggins—Peninsular holdback
- Hoffmannseggia prostrata Lag. ex DC.
- Hoffmannseggia pumilio (Griseb.) B.B.Simpson
- Hoffmannseggia repens (Eastw.) Cockerell—creeping nicker
- Hoffmannseggia tenella Tharp & L.P.Williams—slender rushpea
- Hoffmannseggia trifoliata Cav.
- Hoffmannseggia viscosa (Ruiz & Pav.) Hook. & Arn.
- Hoffmannseggia watsonii (Fisher) Rose
- Hoffmannseggia yaviensis Ulibarri
