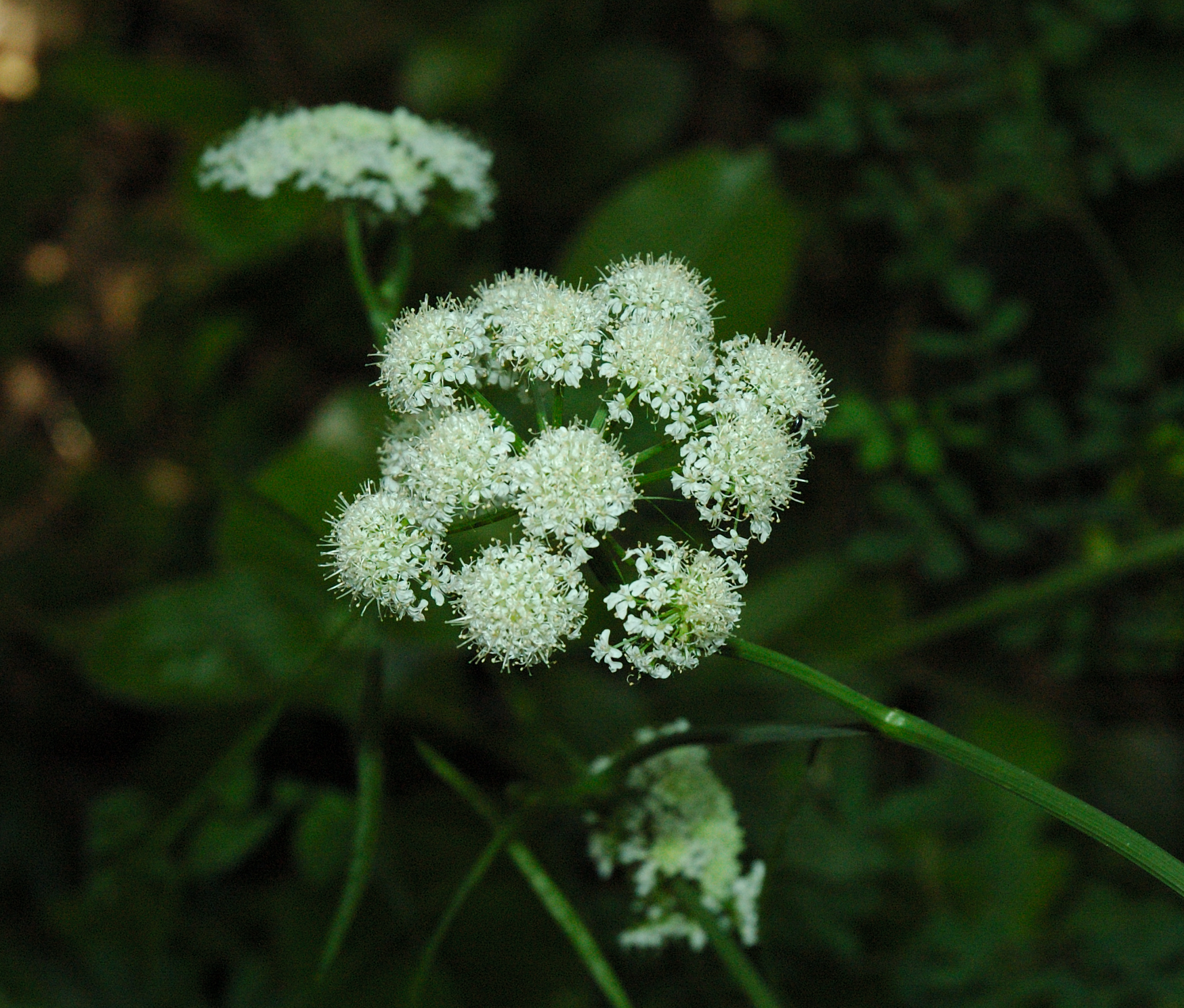
- Bunium bulbocastanum

Scientific classification
- Kingdom: Plantae
- Clade: Tracheophytes
- Clade: Angiosperms
- Clade: Eudicots
- Clade: Asterids
- Order: Apiales
- Family: Apiaceae
- Subfamily: Apioideae
- Tribe: Pyramidoptereae
- Genus: Bunium; L.

Synonyms
- Buniella Schischk.; Diaphycarpus Calest.; Wallrothia Spreng.

= Bunium =

Genus of flowering plants

Bunium is a genus of flowering plants in the family Apiaceae, with 45 to 50 species.

== Species ==
Species include:

- Bunium afghanicum Beauverd
- Bunium alatum Pimenov & Kljuykov
- Bunium alpinum Waldst. & Kit.
- Bunium angrenii Korovin
- Bunium avromanum (Boiss. & Hausskn.) Drude
- Bunium badachschanicum Kamelin
- Bunium badghysi (Korovin) Korovin
- Bunium bourgaei (Boiss.) Freyn & Sint.
- Bunium brachyactis (Post) H.Wolff
- Bunium brevifolium Lowe
- Bunium bulbocastanum L. – black cumin
- Bunium capusii (Franch.) Korovin
- Bunium caroides (Boiss.) Hausskn. ex Bornm.
- Bunium chabertii (Batt.) Batt.
- Bunium chaerophylloides (Regel & Schmalh.) Drude
- Bunium cornigerum (Boiss. & Hausskn.) Drude
- Bunium cylindricum (Boiss. & Hohen.) Drude
- Bunium elegans (Fenzl) Freyn
- Bunium fedtschenkoanum Korovin ex Kamelin
- Bunium ferulaceum Sm.
- Bunium hissaricum Korovin
- Bunium intermedium Korovin
- Bunium kandaharicum Rech.f.
- Bunium kopetdagense Geld.
- Bunium korovinii R.Kam. & Geld.
- Bunium kuhitangi Nevski
- Bunium lindbergii Rech.f. & Riedl
- Bunium longilobum Klyuikov
- Bunium longipes Freyn
- Bunium luristanicum Rech.f.
- Bunium microcarpum (Boiss.) Freyn & Bornm.
- Bunium nilghirense H.Wolff
- Bunium nothum (Clarke) P.K.Mukh.
- Bunium nudum (Post) H.Wolff
- Bunium pachypodum P.W.Ball
- Bunium paucifolium DC.
- Bunium persicum (Boiss.) B.Fedtsch.
- Bunium pestalozzae Boiss.
- Bunium pinnatifolium Kljuykov
- Bunium rectangulum Boiss. & Hausskn.
- Bunium scabrellum Korovin
- Bunium seravschanicum Korovin
- Bunium vaginatum Korovin
- Bunium verruculosum C.C.Towns.
- Bunium wolffii Klyuikov
