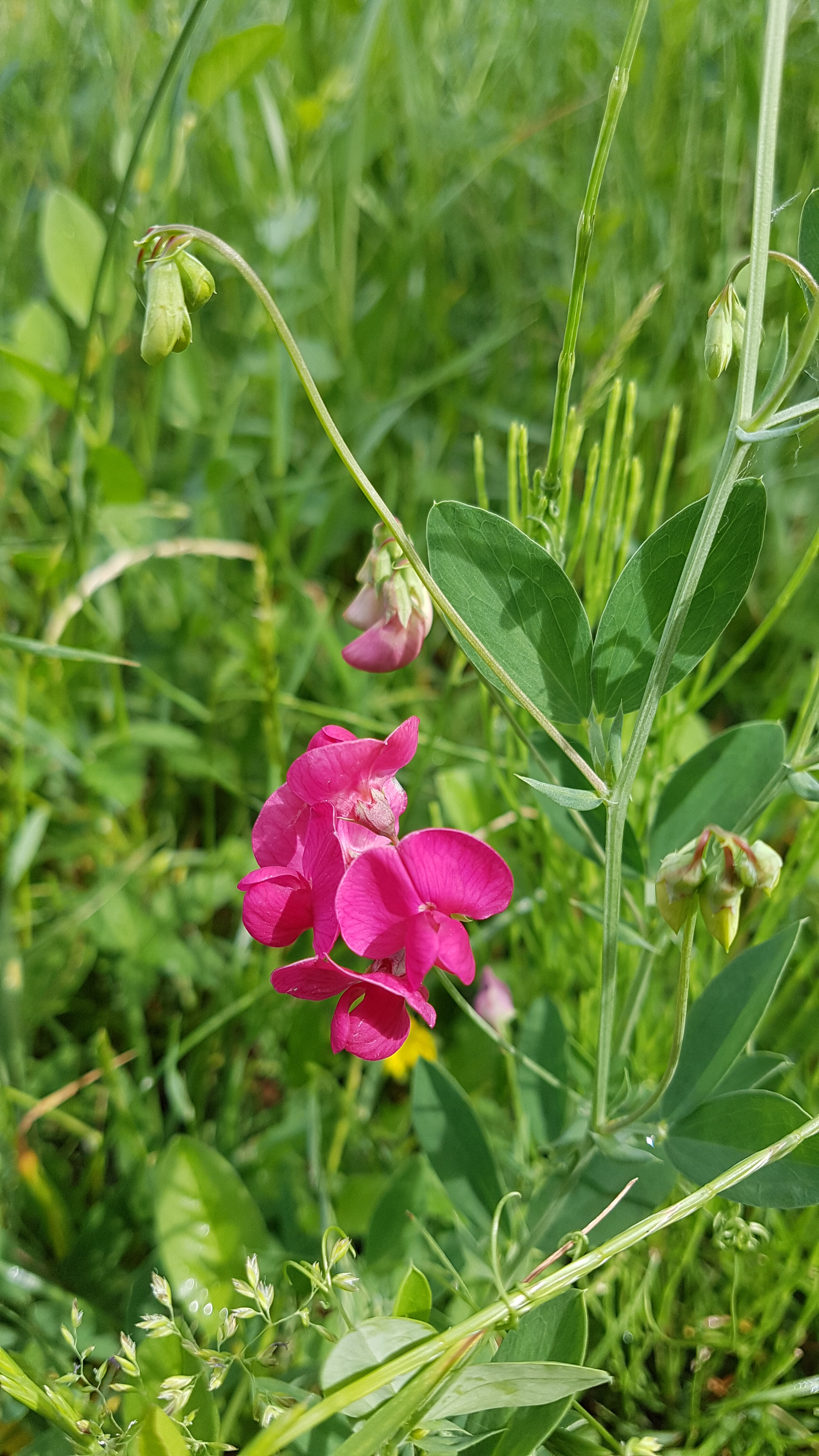
- Flowers, flower buds, and leaves of Lathyrus tuberosus

Scientific classification
- Kingdom: Plantae
- Clade: Tracheophytes
- Clade: Angiosperms
- Clade: Eudicots
- Clade: Rosids
- Order: Fabales
- Family: Fabaceae
- Subfamily: Faboideae
- Genus: Lathyrus
- Species: L. tuberosus

Binomial name
- Lathyrus tuberosus L.

= Lathyrus tuberosus =

Species of legume

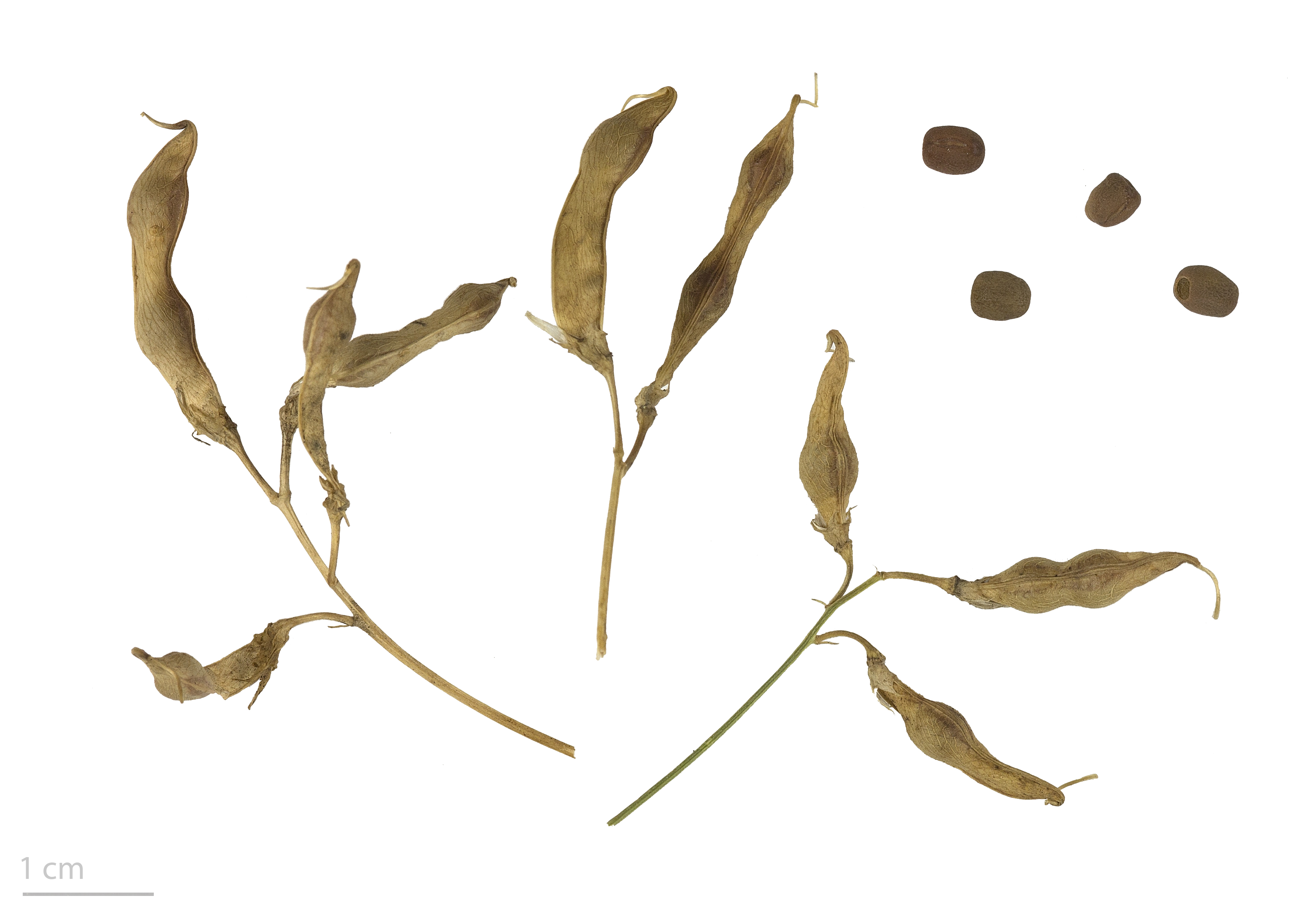
Lathyrus tuberosus - MHNT

Lathyrus tuberosus (also known as the tuberous pea, tuberous vetchling, earthnut pea, aardaker, or tine-tare) is a small, climbing perennial plant, native in moist temperate parts of Europe and Western Asia. The plant is a trailer or weak climber, supported by tendrils, growing to 1.2 m tall. The leaves are pinnate, with two leaflets and a branched twining tendril at the apex of the petiole. Its flowers are hermaphroditic, pollinated by bees. The plants can also spread vegetatively from the root system.

== Description ==
Lathyrus tuberosus is a perennial plant with edible tubers 3 to 5 cm (1.2 to 2.0 in) long attached to its stolons. The stem grows to 30 to 80 cm (12 to 31 in) and is sprawling, wingless and nearly hairless. The leaves are alternate with short stalks and narrow stipules. The leaf blades are pinnate with a single pair of broad lanceolate leaflets with blunt tips, entire margins and a terminal tendril. The inflorescence has a long stem and two to seven pinkish-red flowers, each 12 to 20 mm (0.5 to 0.8 in) long. These have five sepals and five petals and are irregular, with a standard, two wings and a fused keel. There are ten stamens and a single carpel. The fruit is a brown pod containing up to six seeds. The tubers were found at 14 cm below the soil surface. The rather unbranched roots can reach 70 cm of depth. This plant flowers from late May to August.

== Reproduction ==
Lathyrus tuberosus can be propagated vegetatively by tuber multiplication or sexually by seeds. The flower is hermaphroditic and pollinated by bees. Mature seed pods of L tuberosus may only carry few viable seeds. The mature seeds sometimes are infested by a Bruchus affinis beetle and Hymenopterans. Seed germination rate at 20 °C after 50 days is very low, but it is increased heavily by scarification of the seed coat. After germination L. tuberosus grows very quickly and seed pods and small tubers are formed in the first year.

The tubers of the plant will form stolons and new roots during the development of the plant. The tubers can form new stems and grow as a separate plant. Division of tubers is possible when the plant is dormant in autumn. Vegetative propagation of L. tuberosus is very successful and sexual reproduction might only take place for genetic diversification or to colonize different habitats.

The diploid plant has 14 chromosomes. There is a high variation in the percentage of constitutive heterochromatin between different L tuberosus plants.

During formation of endosperm and embryo development of L. tuberosus, protein bodies are formed. All cells of the embryo organs are involved in protein storage accumulation. The ploidy level of nuclei is linked to the total protein body volume in the seed. Breeding could increase seed protein level by increasing ploidy level.

== Distribution and habitat ==
The place of origin of L. tuberosus lies in Westasia and Eastern Europe. It is assumed that it spread simultaneously with cereal cultivation across middle Europe. It was introduced to North America and can even be found in Northern Africa. Today it ranks among the endangered species in Switzerland and Austria. Its typical habitat is rough grassy places, broad-leaved woodland, forest margins, hedgerows and banks. L tuberosus prefers alkaline, calcareous, loamy soils, that are rich in fine contents. However it is also found on stony grounds. It depends on near-surface soil moisture in warmer, dryer regions, due to its root morphology. Lathyrus tuberosus may reach habitats at altitudes up to 2000 m above sea level.

== Cultivation and uses ==
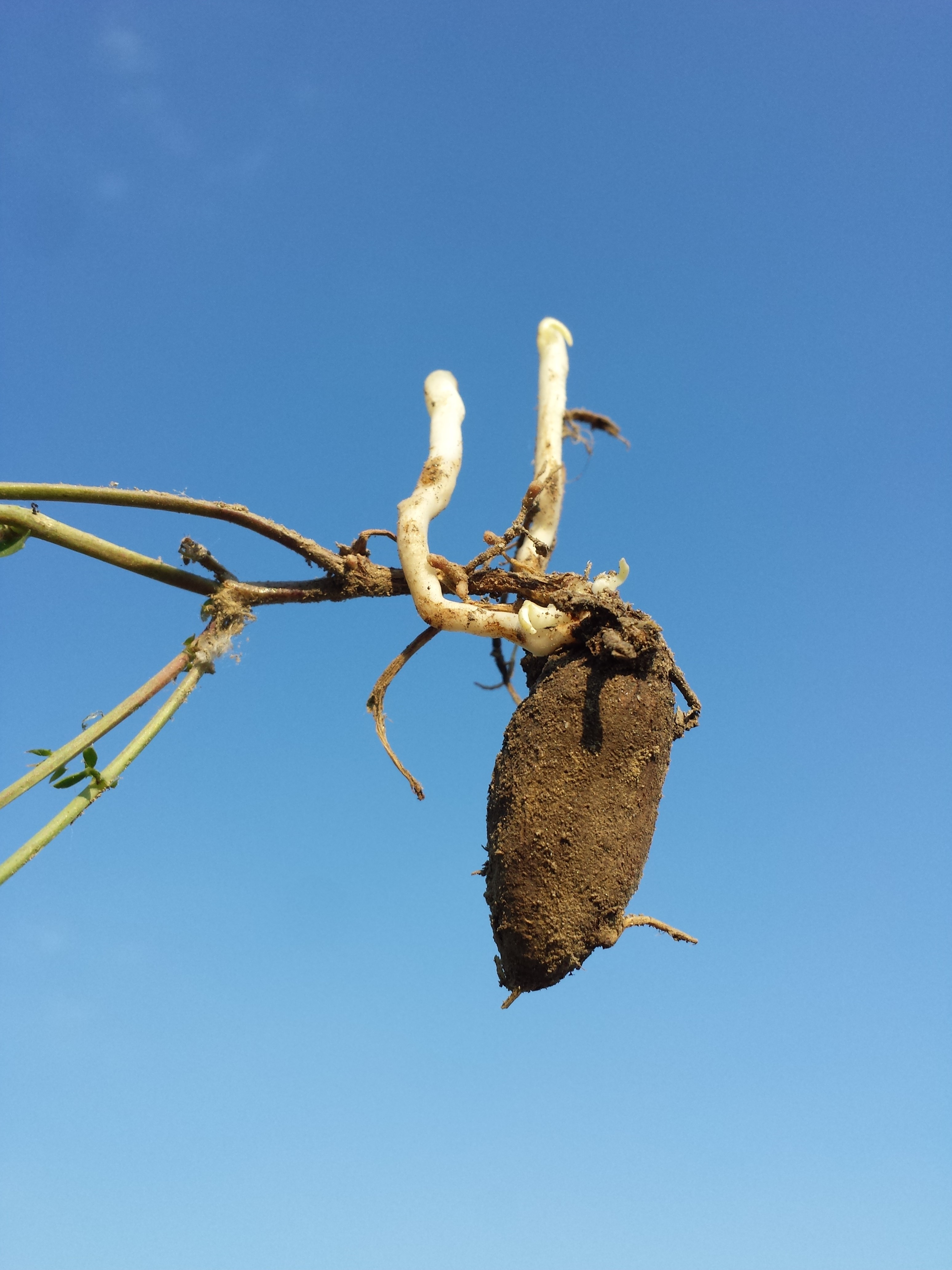
Tuber of Lathyrus tuberosus

Today in allotments of middle Europe, Lathyrus tuberosus is occasionally grown for its odour, its appearance and its edible tubers. In the 16th century flowers of the plant were distilled to produce perfume. In the 18th century in the Lower Rhine Valley of Germany and in the Netherlands it was grown on a larger scale. After harvesting, tubers were cooked or roasted for human nutrition. At the same time the root legume with the "gentle nutty flavor" was in demand on French markets. The production of fermented beverages or bread were occasional other uses of the tuber, whereas oil was pressed from the seeds. Promising experiments with L. tuberosus as a forage crop were conducted in the 20th century. Recent studies from Turkey show that above-ground tissue of L. tuberosus is still consumed as a wild plant by parts of the rural population.

Lathyrus tuberosus succeeds on soils where other crops fail to grow, due to being adapted to a broad range of conditions. The tuberous crop was found to resist high soil salinity. It was observed that plants with higher salt tolerance had even higher photosynthesis rates. The legume shows a strong negative response to ammonium nitrate nitrogen fertilizer.

Although palatable and nutritious, the crop L. tuberosus is hampered by low yields, since it needs to be cultivated two to three years to form tubers of a reasonable size. The first attempt to increase yield was done in 1968 with better cultivation techniques and hybridization. This test revealed the high breeding potential of the plant, leading to a six-fold increase in tuber yield . In 2026 the Dutch startup Aardaia raised €5 million to focus on optimizing the agronomic reliability of L. tuberosus using modern breeding technology.

The plant is attractive and susceptible to slugs. It is considered a noxious weed in Ontario. Commercial herbicides on the European market target L tuberosus.

== Nutritional value ==
The delicious taste of the tubers is widely reported. The tuber contains 16-20 % starch, 5% sugar and 10-12 % protein. Proteins consist of the amino acids glutamine, arginine and asparagine. Furthermore, α-amino-8-oxaly-amino-butyric acid and lathyrogenic substances could be found in the plant. Vitamin C contents of 161.25 mg/100 g in the aboveground biomass were observed. That amount of ascorbic acid is approximately twice as high as the reference daily intake and three times higher than the vitamin C content of lemons. Calcium amounts are almost twice as high as in cow milk.

Mineral concentrations in stems and leaves
Minerals	mg/100g
Phosphorus	66
Potassium	1544
Magnesium	43
Calcium	228
Sodium	2
Iron	2.5
Zinc	0.6
Manganese	0.78
Copper	0.07

== Diversification of agroecosystems ==
Lathyrus tuberosus is a multi-purpose plant. The leaves and the tubers are edible and rich in vitamins. It belongs to the plant family of Leguminosae, plants which do biological fixation of nitrogen. Hence L tuberosus increases soil fertility. Moreover, its flowers are pollinated by bees. Because of these plant features, L tuberosus can be used to increase biodiversity in agroecosystems. Since tuber development takes several years, the plant would be well suitable for permaculture.
