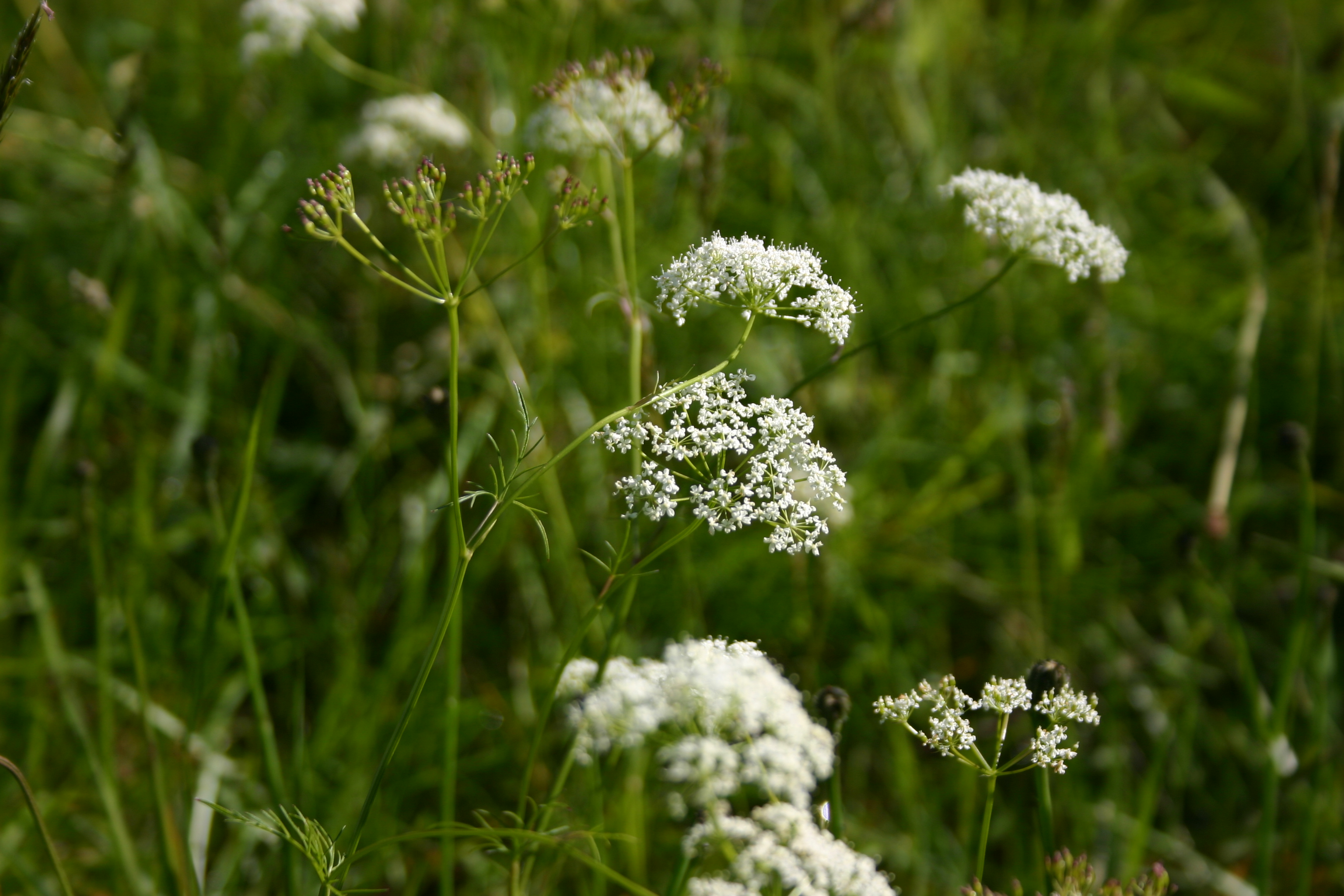
- Conopodium majus

Scientific classification
- Kingdom: Plantae
- Clade: Tracheophytes
- Clade: Angiosperms
- Clade: Eudicots
- Clade: Asterids
- Order: Apiales
- Family: Apiaceae
- Subfamily: Apioideae
- Tribe: Scandiceae
- Subtribe: Scandicinae
- Genus: Conopodium; W.D.J.Koch

Synonyms
- Balansaea Boiss. & Reut.; Butinia Boiss.; Heterotaenia Boiss.

= Conopodium =

Genus of flowering plants

Conopodium is a genus of flowering plants belonging to the family Apiaceae.

Its native range is north-western Europe and the Mediterranean.

== Species ==
The following species are recognised in the genus Conopodium:

- Conopodium arvense (Coss.) Calest.
- Conopodium bunioides (Boiss.) Calest.
- Conopodium glaberrimum (Desf.) Engstrand.
- Conopodium majus (Gouan) Loret
- Conopodium marianum Lange
- Conopodium pyrenaeum (Loisel.) Miégev.
- Conopodium subcarneum (Boiss. & Reut.) Boiss.
- Conopodium thalictrifolium (Boiss.) Calest.
