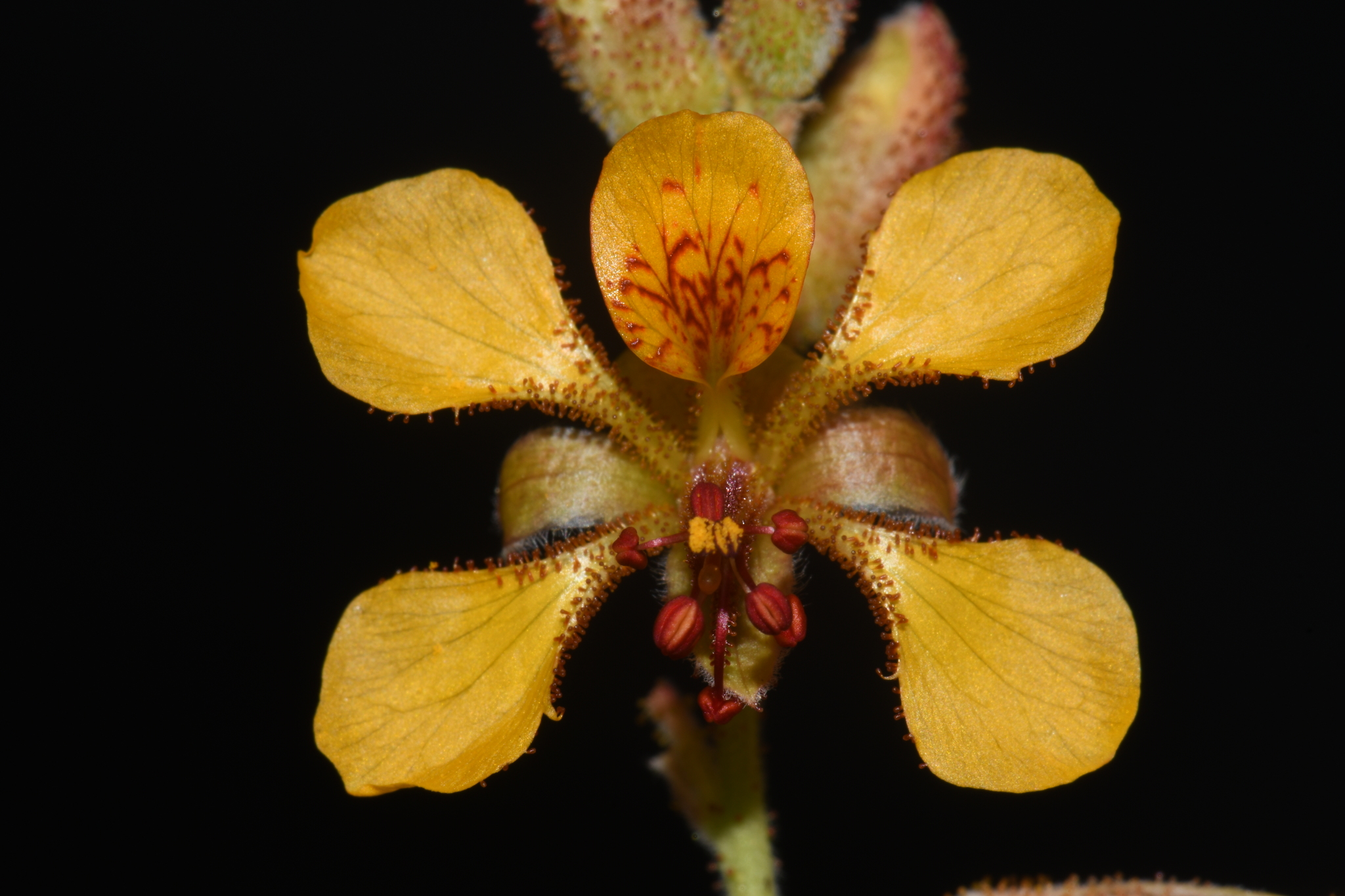

Conservation status
- Secure (NatureServe)

Scientific classification
- Kingdom: Plantae
- Clade: Tracheophytes
- Clade: Angiosperms
- Clade: Eudicots
- Clade: Rosids
- Order: Fabales
- Family: Fabaceae
- Subfamily: Caesalpinioideae
- Genus: Hoffmannseggia
- Species: H. glauca

Binomial name
- Hoffmannseggia glauca (Ortega) Eifert

Synonyms
- Caesalpinia chicamana Killip & J. F. Macbr. 1943; Caesalpinia falcaria (Cav.) Fisher 1893; var. capitata (Fisher 1892) Fisher 1893; var. densiflora (Benth. 1852) Fisher 1893; var. falcaria (Cav.) Fisher 1893; var. pringlei (Fisher 1892) Fisher 1893; var. rusbyi (Fisher 1892) Fisher 1893; var. stricta (Benth. in A. Gray 1852) Fisher 1893; Caesalpinia glauca (Ortega 1797) Kuntze 1898; Hoffmannseggia chicamana (Killip & J. F. Macbr.) Eifert 1972; Hoffmannseggia densiflora Benth. in A. Gray 1852; Hoffmannseggia falcaria Cav. 1798, nom. illeg.; var. capitata Fisher 1892; var. demissa (A. Gray 1852) Fisher 1892; var. falcaria Cav. 1798; var. pringlei Fisher 1892; var. rusbyi Fisher 1892; var. stricta (Benth. in A. Gray 1852) Fisher 1892; Hoffmannseggia stricta Benth. in A. Gray 1852; var. demissa A. Gray 1852; var. stricta Benth. in A. Gray 1852; Larrea densiflora (Benth. 1852) Britton 1930; Larrea glauca Ortega 1797

= Hoffmannseggia glauca =

Pig-nut

Species of plant

Hoffmannseggia glauca is a dicot found in the legume family, Fabaceae. Its common names include Indian rushpea, hog potato, and pig nut.

It is a California native that prefers alkaline desert flats, creosote bush communities, and disturbed areas. It prefers elevations of less than 900 metres (3,000 ft). Hoffmannseggia glauca is found outside California in Western Nevada, Texas, Mexico, and South America. In California, H. glauca may be found in the San Joaquin Valley, the Southern Coastal Ranges, and the Western Transverse Ranges.

== Description ==
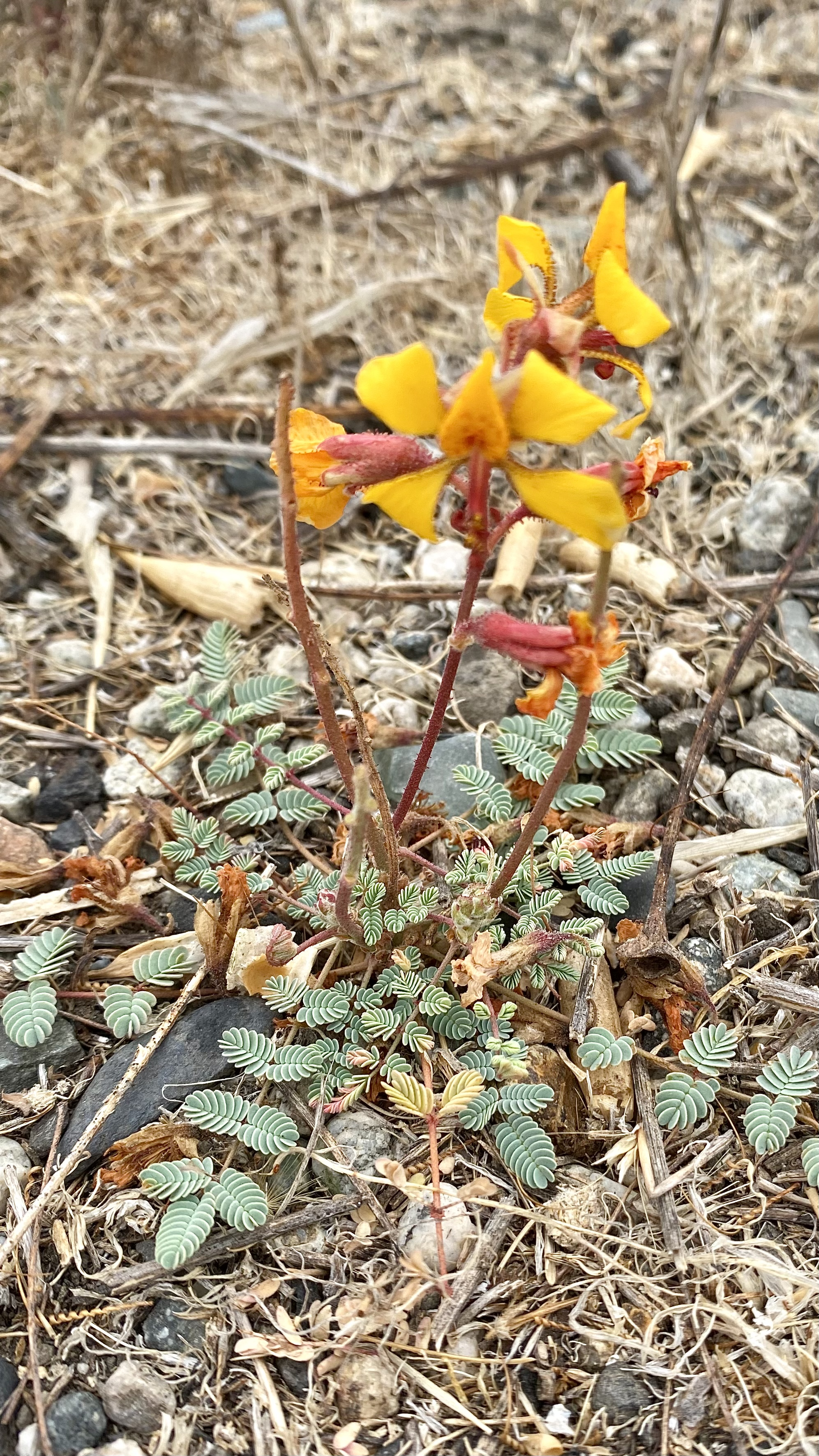
Hoffmannseggia glauca, sometimes called “Indian rushpea”

Hoffmannseggia glauca is an erect perennial herb that can measure up to 30 cm tall. Branches are slender, growing out from the base of the plant, and have stalked glands. The foliage is composed of compound leaves with primary and secondary leaflets. Primary leaflets (5–20 mm) are odd-pinnate, while secondary leaflets (4–6 mm) are even-pinnate.

The inflorescence measures 5–15 cm and is glandular. Flowers are orange-red with spreading petals and are produced between the months of April and June. The fruit that develops is 1.5–4 cm long, glandular, curved, and short-stalked. The fruit may or may not be deciduous.

The USDA indicates that Hoffmannseggia glauca is considered a noxious weed in Kansas.

== Uses ==
The Pima, Apache, Cocopa, and Pueblo ate the tubers or bulbs raw, boiled or roasted.
