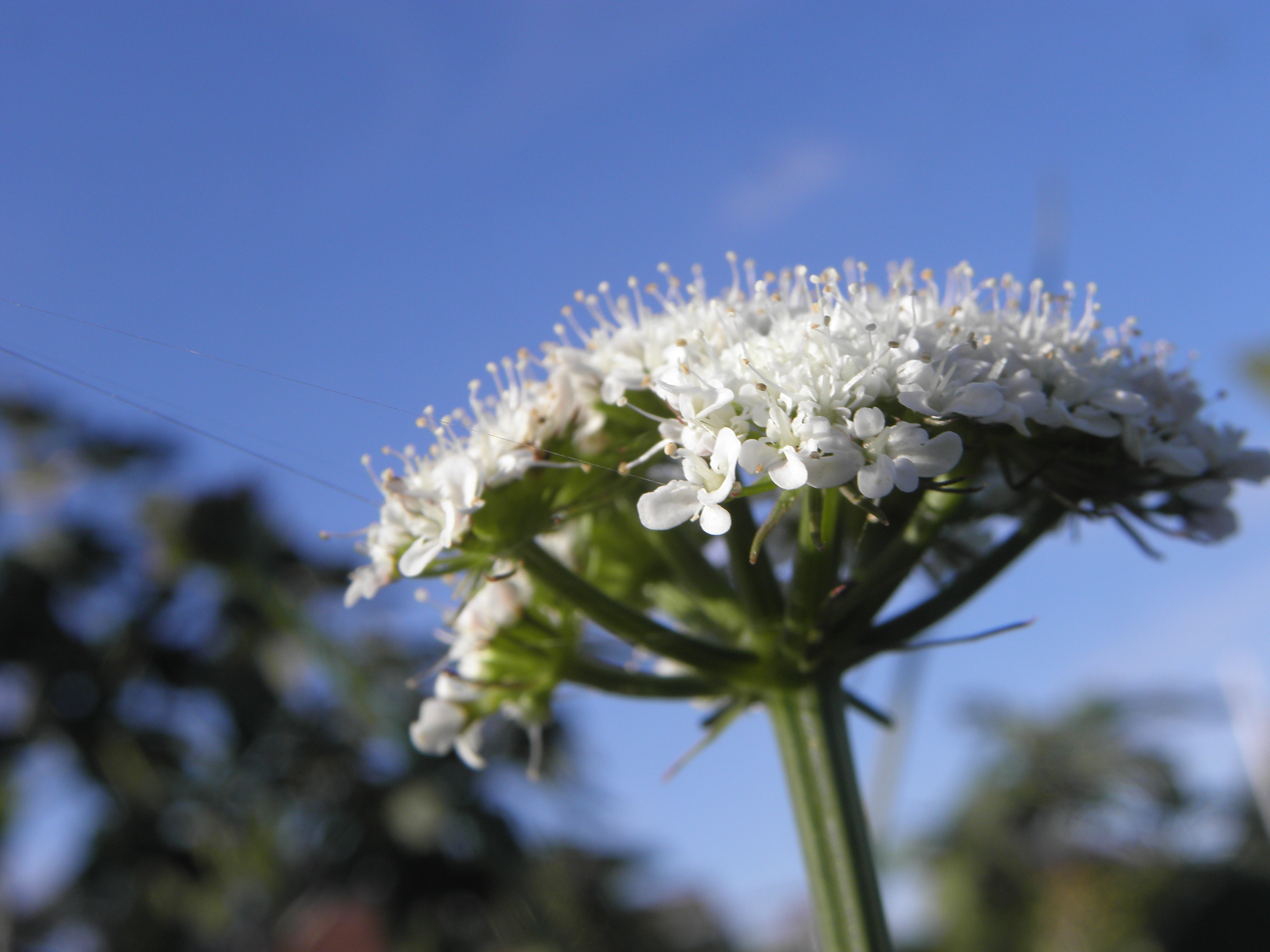

Scientific classification
- Kingdom: Plantae
- Clade: Tracheophytes
- Clade: Angiosperms
- Clade: Eudicots
- Clade: Asterids
- Order: Apiales
- Family: Apiaceae
- Genus: Bunium
- Species: B. bulbocastanum

Binomial name
- Bunium bulbocastanum L.

Synonyms
- Bulbocastanum balearicum Sennen; Bulbocastanum linnaei Schur; Bulbocastanum mauritanicum Willk.; Bulbocastanum mediterraneum Albert; Bunium agrarium Albert; Bunium aphyllum Jan ex DC.; Bunium bulbosum Dulac; Bunium collinum Albert; Bunium crassifolium (Batt.) Batt.; Bunium elatum (Batt.) Batt.; Bunium fontanesii (Pers.) Maire; Bunium majus Vill.; Bunium mauritanicum (Boiss. & Reut.) Batt.; Bunium mediterraneum Albert; Bunium minus Gouan; Bunium perotii Braun-Blanq. & Maire; Carum bulbocastanum (L.) Koch; Carum mauritanicum Boiss. & Reut.; Carvi bulbocastanum (L.) Bubani; Conopodium balearicum (Sennen) M.Hiroe; Diaphycarpus incrassatus (Boiss.) Calest.

= Bunium bulbocastanum =

Species of flowering plant

Bunium bulbocastanum is a plant species in the family Apiaceae. It was once used as a root vegetable in parts of western Europe, and has been called great pignut or earthnut.

== Growth ==
The plant is native to western Europe. It reaches about 60 cm (24 in) tall and 25 cm (9.8 in) wide, bearing frilly leaves and hermaphroditic flowers; it is pollinated by insects and self-fertile.

The small, rounded taproot is edible raw or cooked, and said to taste like sweet chestnuts. The leaf can be used as an herb or garnish similar to parsley.
