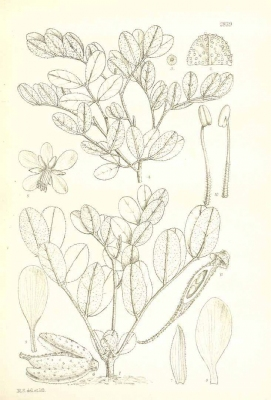

Conservation status
- Endangered (IUCN 3.1)

Scientific classification
- Kingdom: Plantae
- Clade: Embryophytes
- Clade: Tracheophytes
- Clade: Angiosperms
- Clade: Eudicots
- Clade: Rosids
- Order: Fabales
- Family: Fabaceae
- Subfamily: Caesalpinioideae
- Genus: Cordeauxia; Hemsl. (1907)
- Species: C. edulis

Binomial name
- Cordeauxia edulis Hemsl. (1907)

= Cordeauxia =

Cordeauxia edulis

Genus of legumes

Cordeauxia edulis is a plant in the family Fabaceae and the sole species in the genus Cordeauxia. Known by the common name yeheb bush, it is one of the economically most important wild plants of the Horn of Africa, but it is little known outside of its distribution area. It is a multipurpose plant, which allows the survival of nomads by providing them with seeds. Further, the bush serves forage for livestock, firewood and dye. Its wild population is currently declining. Because it is potentially valuable for other hot, dry regions as a resource for food and fodder, it is recommended to take measures against its extinction.

== Taxonomy ==
Cordeauxia edulis is a leguminous plant (Fabaceae) from the genus Cordeauxia. The genus Cordeauxia is in subfamily Caesalpinioideae and tribe Caesalpinieae, and is closely related to the genera Caesalpinia and Stuhlmannia. There are at least two varieties of the species C. edulis: Moqley and Suley. Moqley has smaller and darker leaves as well as a smaller stem diameter than Suley. Furthermore, the pods of Moqley include just one seed whereas the pods of Suley contain several smaller seeds. The seeds of Moqley are claimed to be sweeter. The common name of C. edulis is Yeheb-Nut (English) or Yeheb (French). Other names are Yebb, Hebb, Ye'eh, Yi-ib, Yehib or Yicib. In amharic it is called Ehb, Qud or Quda.

== History ==
The yeheb nut bush has been known to the Somali nomads for centuries. The first Western record dates back to 1871, when the Italian explorer Luigi Robecchi Bricchetti noticed the plant when traversing Somalia to Bari. The bush has been named after Cordeaux, a botanic who first obtained botanical specimens in the Ogaden province (Somali Galbeed) which were found to be a leguminous plant belonging to a hitherto unknown genus in the Caesalpinaceae. Afterward, Hemsley gave the plant the generic name Cordeauxia, with the specific epithet edulis (edible). In 1929, the yeheb bush covered half of the vegetation of large territories in Somalia and Somali region. In 1983 the distribution has been reduced to small regions.

== Distribution ==
The yeheb tree is native in the arid and semi-arid areas in Somalia (Ogaden). Its distribution has rapidly declined from 50% coverage down to only small locations nowadays. These regions are often semi-deserts or open bushy steppes located at altitudes from 100 to 300m. The rainfall rates are very low and frost does not occur. The ground is a very poor red sandy soils. The existence of C. edulis is threatened by war, over-utilization and by drought. Another cause for the decrease of C. edulis is the loss of seeds removed through the local people, eaten by wildlife and destroyed by insects. Its extinction would represent an irreplaceable loss for the long-term survival of the nomadic populations. In 1975, the National Range Agency of Somalia protected an area of about 50ha by prohibiting grazing. Since then, many other areas have been protected from grazing. In these areas and in all the native areas, the situation of Yeheb bush had considerably improved according to a 1983 study. However, a mission in 2015 found that the species had disappeared from the Haud plateau of Somaliland, although still to be found on the Ethiopian side of the border.

It is exotic in Israel, Kenya, Sudan, Tanzania and in the Republic of Yemen. It is a wild species, but also subject to domestication trials, where it was sent to other arid regions, but with poor response, except for Voi, Kenya, where fruits are produced successfully since 1957. Today there is germplasm collection in Ethiopia (ILRI Addis Ababa), Kenya (National Genebank, Kikuyu) and the USA (Southern Regional Plant Introduction Station, Griffin, Georgia).

== Biology ==
It is an evergreen, multistemmed shrub of about 1.6m height but it can also grow up to 4 m. The Yeheb tree has a taproot system, which can go 3m deep. Like that it reaches deep water and can stay green all year round.

- Leaves: The lower surface of the leaves is green with glandular hair. The hair contain cordeauxiaquinone, a magenta-red pigment. The upper surface is olive green. The leaves are alternate and leathery. They have an oval shape and form an asymmetrical pinna with 1-6 pairs but mostly 4. The leaves measure 3–5 cm. They curl when the soil moisture gets low.
- Flowers: The flowers are yellow and contain both sexes. They are 2–5 cm in diameter and have 5 petals. They are grouped in corymbs with very few flowers at the end of the branch. Flowering occurs throughout the year but is more profuse during the rainy season. They are pollinated by insects. The flowers develop at the first stage of the fruit formation, exhibit a dormancy through the dry season and continue the development at the onset of the next rainy period. After that, they mature within a few days.
- Seeds: They have the size of a big hazel-nut, weight 1–3 g and are red-brown. The indehiscent pods include 1–4 round or ovoid seeds, they are by mistake called nuts. The germination rate is about 80% growth.
- Trunk and Bark: They have a yellow-brownish color.
- Growth: The growth in the first developing stages is slow due to small proportion of reserve proteins and the development of the taproot system.
- Chromosome number: 2n=24
- Inflorescence: The inflorescence is a terminal few-flowered raceme.

== Cultivation ==
C. edulis is cultivated on a small scale in Somalia and near Voi in Kenya. It has only recently been a subject to domestication, therefore little knowledge about propagation, the agronomic practices and its potential for selection as well as breeding exists. The potential of this multipurpose plant is very promising, especially for other arid, hot regions as an important food and fodder resource.

=== Environmental requirements ===
C. edulis is a drought resistant plant and tolerant to desertification. For optimal plant development, average temperature and rainfall requirements are 25 °C and 250 - 400mm/year (two rainy seasons). Occasionally the Yeheb tree can also cope with minimal precipitation levels of 150–200 mm/year. It grows on red sandy soils (called Haud) with a low nitrogen content. The soils are alkaline and their texture is fine to coarse sand or grit to loamy sand. C. edulis prefers elevated stands, where no water accumulates. It grows in altitudes between 100–1000 m and is found in vegetation with acacia-commiphora deciduous bushland and thickets.

=== Sowing ===
The seed is often said to be viable for a few months only, but seed coated in wood ash and stored in a sack is reputed to remain viable for at least a year. The seeds should be sown on soils where the taproot can develop. There is no information available on optimal density and spacing. Under natural conditions there are up to 320plants/ha. The seedlings need ample water after planting. A transplantation of the plant destroys the taproot and leads to mortality. C. edulis grows slowly in the early stages, because of the buildup of the strong taproot and the small proportion in reserve proteins. Once the plants are established, they need almost no care. The plant is self-reseeding, but due to the fact that seeds are often infested by weevils and larvae or roasted in the post-harvest treatment, it is difficult to obtain viable seeds for planting. The plantation established near Voi, Kenya, is currently the sole source of germplasm.

=== Harvest ===
The yeheb seeds are usually harvested from wild plants. The recommended harvest time is in June, but in Somalia nowadays the harvest is reported to occur twice a year. This is possible if both rainy seasons occur within their normal extent and contribute enough rain for the plant. The Yeheb-Nut is mainly harvested manually by children and women, and the harvest process is described as hard work. Due to the high demand and many droughts in the last few years, the shrub is often harvested immature at an age below 3 years. The plants are often overused as the people remove all seeds at the same time.

=== Yield ===
Yeheb produces few fruits in the first three years, but it can live up to many years. The quantity of the yield increases with higher age, but also depends on the amount of rainfall. The yield is about 5–8 kg seeds. The estimated average forage production is 325–450 kg/ha.

=== Postharvest treatment and storage ===
The seeds are rarely eaten fresh by Somali children, more often they are first dried in the shade during 7–10 days and then the hard seed coat is removed. For storage, the seeds have to be roasted or boiled to prevent fungal attack, to kill insects eggs and larvae inside the seeds and to harden the seed coat. After roasting in the hot ash, which leads to yield losses due to damage of the seeds, the seeds are coated in weed ash and stored in sacks in the house for personal use or for trade at local markets at a later time. The seeds treated this way are storable for about one year. Pastoralists keep the seeds in containers out of dried and tanned camel leather, where they can be stored for many years. The firewood for roasting is often taken from the shrub, which hampers the regeneration of the population in addition to the complete removal of all the seeds.

== Use ==
The seeds are usually consumed by local people and rarely sold in town. The demand exceeds the supply, because the plant population is declining.

=== Human Use ===
- Food: The seeds are eaten dried, boiled, roasted or raw. Sometimes the seeds of C. edulis is the only available food for Somali nomads during droughts. The seeds are nutritious and taste sweet with a chestnut flavour after roasting. Fresh or dried seeds taste sour. Local people like its taste so there is a saying Fadhi iyo Fuud Yicibeed lays la waa", which means: Those who remain seated and laze will not get Yihib. The raw seeds contain a considerable amount of serine protease (trypsin) inhibitors, causing nausea or stomach distress. These inhibitors are destroyed by heating during cooking or roasting.
- Drinks: People made a tea out of the leaves or drink the sweet water in which the seeds have been boiled as a beverage.
- Medicine: C. edulis can regulate gastric secretion. A study showed that the consumption of the plant enhances the production of erythrocytes and is therefore used as a remedy for anemia.

=== Forage ===
C. edulis is an important bee forage. Furthermore, it serves as fodder for camels, goats, sheep and cattle in dry season but the shrubs cannot withstand long-term grazing pressure. It is essential for the livestock production, especially in central Somalia and eastern Ethiopia where C. edulis can cover 85% of the good-quality feed during the dry season. During the rainy season, the animals usually avoid the plant because of its high content of tannins in the leaves (see table below). The leaf content of K, Ca, Mg, S, Ni, Cr, V and Ti is adequate. The content of N and P is low, whereas the latter is probably a consequence of the low P stock in the soil. Al and Fe content is high, probably due to dust. Also, the Ca/Mg and Ca/P ratio is too high. Overall, there could be problems to cover the demand of P, Mg, Mn and partly Zn of grazing stock by feeding only Yeheb. C. edulis can cause intestinal disorders in goats when eaten as the sole diet.

C. edulis also contains a naphthoquinone, cordeauxione (cordeauxiaquinone). It is found in the glands of the leaves and is unique for C.edulis. It is used as a red dye. If goats browse on the leaves of C. edulis, their feet become light-orange in color and their urine turn purple. As Cordeauxione makes calcium complexes, teeth of animals get orange-red and their bones pink when they eat the leaves. The pink bones are considered a sign of good meat quality in Somalia and Saudi Arabia.

Density and available forage
Density (plant/ha)	Forage (kg/ha)	Forage (kg/plant)
162	325.62	1.99
226	334.48	1.48
319	452.98	1.42

Leaf nutrient levels (%)
	N	P	K	Ca	Mg	S	Si	Cl
Moqley variety	1.49	0.13	0.71	1.49	0.18	0.17	0.55	0.23
Suley variety	1.27	0.11	0.65	1.75	0.11	0.14	0.40	0.09

Leaf nutrient levels (ppm)
	Al	Fe	Mn	Cu	Zn	B	Ni	Cr	V	Ti	Sr
Moqley variety	913	735	46	14	24	18	-	-	-	-	-
Suley variety	593	438	39	8	21	48	2.2	2.8	1.1	12.6	81.7

Other leaf contents
Protein (%)	Energy (KJ/100g dry matter)	Digestibility of dry matter (%)	Tannin Content (%)	Cordeauxione (%)
7.5-11.8	559-586	27.2-39.8	2.5-2.7	0.7-0.8%

=== Industrial Use ===
- Fuel: The wood is a good firewood, also when wet.
- Insect defence: Roasting or boiling of freshly picked seeds provide a good insect defence.
- Industry: The red dye in the glands of the leaves can be used for dyeing textiles. The dye can also be extracted by alkaline or acid dissolver, whereas first leads to a more intense violet color.
- Soap: Soap can be made out of the seed oil.
- Construction timber: The wood is popular as a building material due to its resistance to termites.

=== Other uses ===
- Livestock fences
- Nitrogen fixation
- Soil conservation
- Mulch

== International trade ==
There is some trade between Ethiopia, Somalia and Arabia, but no quantitative information available. The Yeheb seed is suggested by many studies to have a potential market in Europe as a "dessert nut".

== Pests and diseases ==
- Seeds: weevils and moth larvae
- Shrubs: rarely any insect pests

== Nutritional aspects ==
The seeds are rich in starch, sugar, protein and fat. The Suley variety shows higher protein and fat content than the Moqley variety. Their carbohydrate and protein contents are less than those of most other legumes eaten in the Horn of Africa. However, C. edulis grows where it is impossible for the usual legumes to grow. The amino-acid composition of C.edulis is close to that of the Papilionaceae (e.g. Methionine-deficient).

Chemical composition of Yeheb seeds (%)
	Moqley variety	Suley variety
Moisture	16.9	16.2
Protein	12.6	14.4
Fat	9.9	10.8
Starch	34.0	31.4
Reducing sugars	2.3	2.2
Sucrose	19.5	20.1
Ash	2.7	2.9
Fibre	2.1	2.0

The seeds of yeheb are rich in sodium, potassium and phosphorus; thus they contain a small amount of calcium and magnesium.

Element composition of Yeheb seed ash [mg/100g] (%)
Element	Moqley	Suley
Sodium	452	493
Potassium	625	633
Calcium	31	33
Magnesium	82	79
Phosphorus	221	232
Chlorine	92	94

Both varieties contain a lot of amino acids; yeheb seeds have a high content of the essential amino acids lysine and arginine, but are deficient in tryptophan and isoleucine. Phytohaemagglutinin, a toxic lectin often present in legumes, is absent in Yeheb seeds; this is an additional nutritional advantage.

Amino acids composition of Yeheb seed protein (var. Moqley) [%]
Amino Acid	Lysine	Histidine	Arginine	Aspartic acid	Threonine	Serine	Proline	Glycine	Alanine	Cystine	Valine	Methionine	Isoleucine	Leucine	Tyrosine	Phenylalanine
%	3.9	1.3	9.1	18.7	2.1	6.7	8.8	8.2	8.6	tr.	1.3	2.4	tr.	3.8	2.9	1.4
