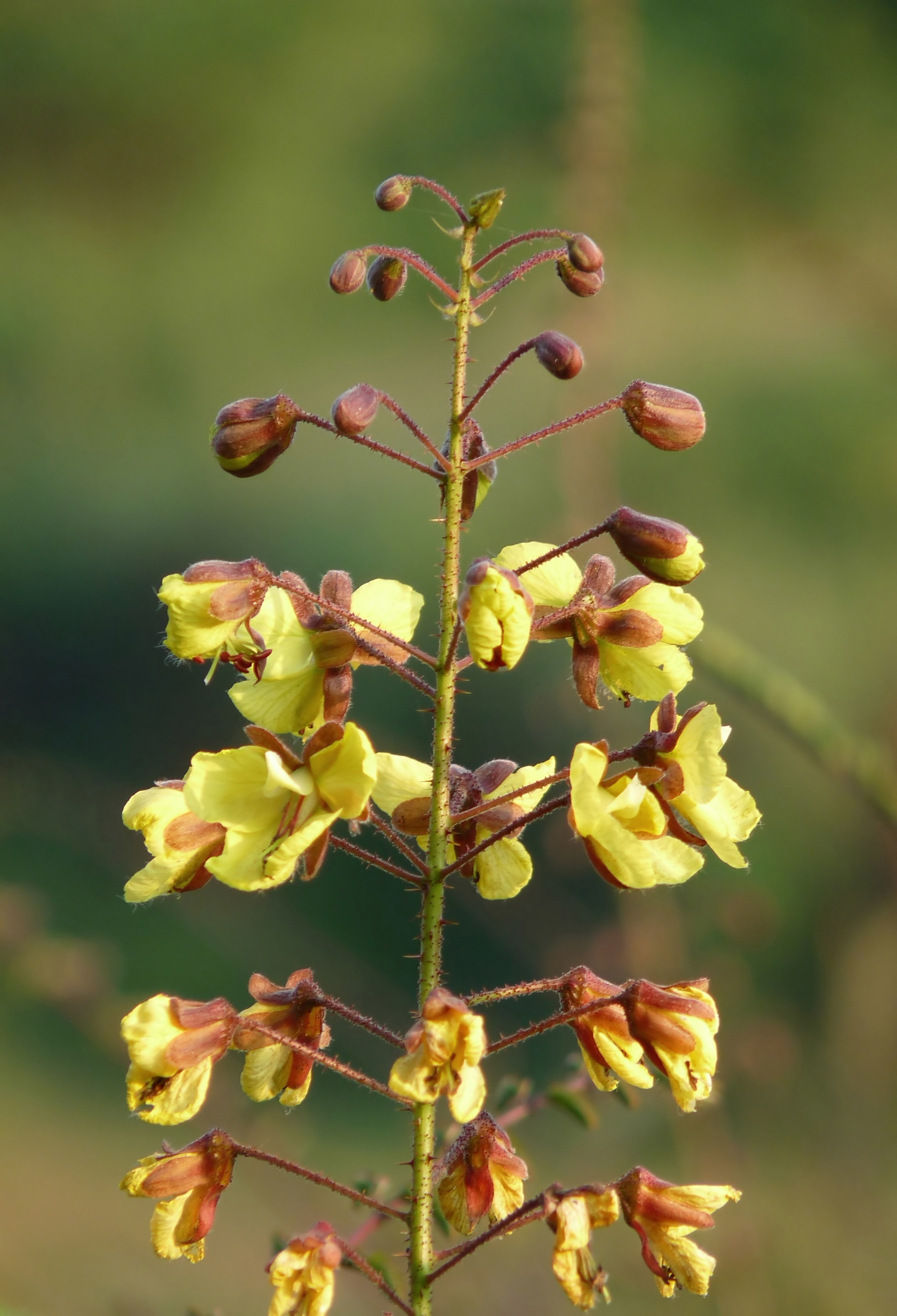

Scientific classification
- Kingdom: Plantae
- Clade: Tracheophytes
- Clade: Angiosperms
- Clade: Eudicots
- Clade: Rosids
- Order: Fabales
- Family: Fabaceae
- Subfamily: Caesalpinioideae
- Tribe: Caesalpinieae
- Genus: Hultholia; Gagnon & G.P.Lewis
- Species: H. mimosoides

Binomial name
- Hultholia mimosoides (Lam.) E. Gagnon & G. P. Lewis

Synonyms
- Biancaea mimosoides (Lam.) Tod.; Caesalpinia mimosoides Lam.; Caesalpinia resupinata Roxb.; Caesalpinia simora Roxb.

= Hultholia =

Genus of legumes

Hultholia mimosoides is a liana species and the sole species in the genus Hultholia. It was formerly placed in the genus Caesalpinia but phylogenetic studies identified the group to be polyphyletic, leading the placement of Caesalpinia mimosoides in a new genus, Hultholia in the tribe Caesalpinieae. Its distribution includes: Bangladesh, Yunnan in China, India, Laos, Myanmar, Thailand, and Vietnam.

This species is distinct and can be separated from Caesalpinia by the glandular spots covering the stem, calyx, and fruits. The pods are falcate and inflated. The needle-like trichomes on the stem are different from the prickles on stems of species in Mezoneuron and other genera previously placed in Caesalpinia. The genus name commemorates the Cambodian taxonomist Salvamony Hul Thol.

Gallic acid can be extracted from the plant. It is a food plant for the caterpillars of Eurema blanda.

== Gallery ==
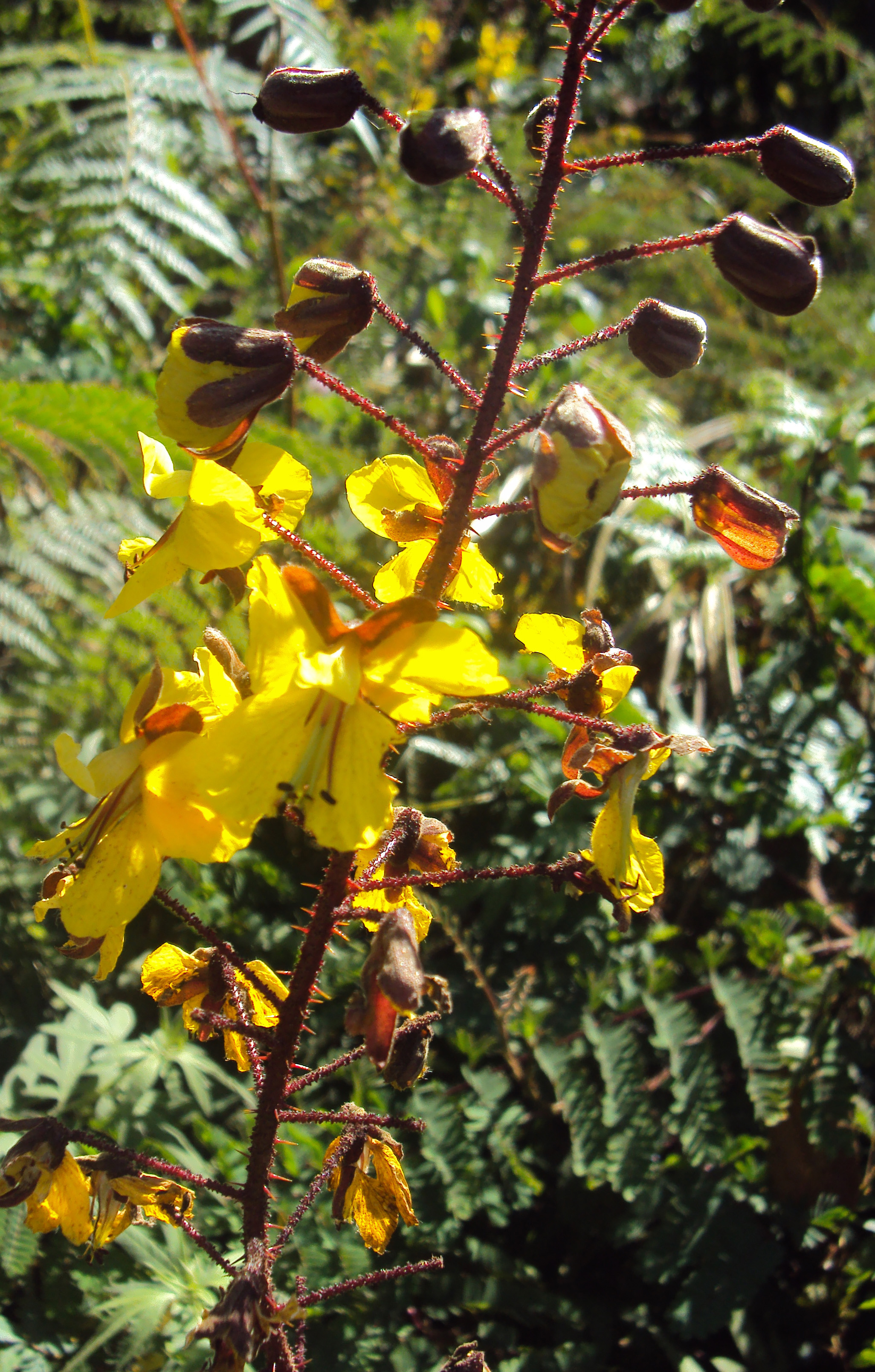

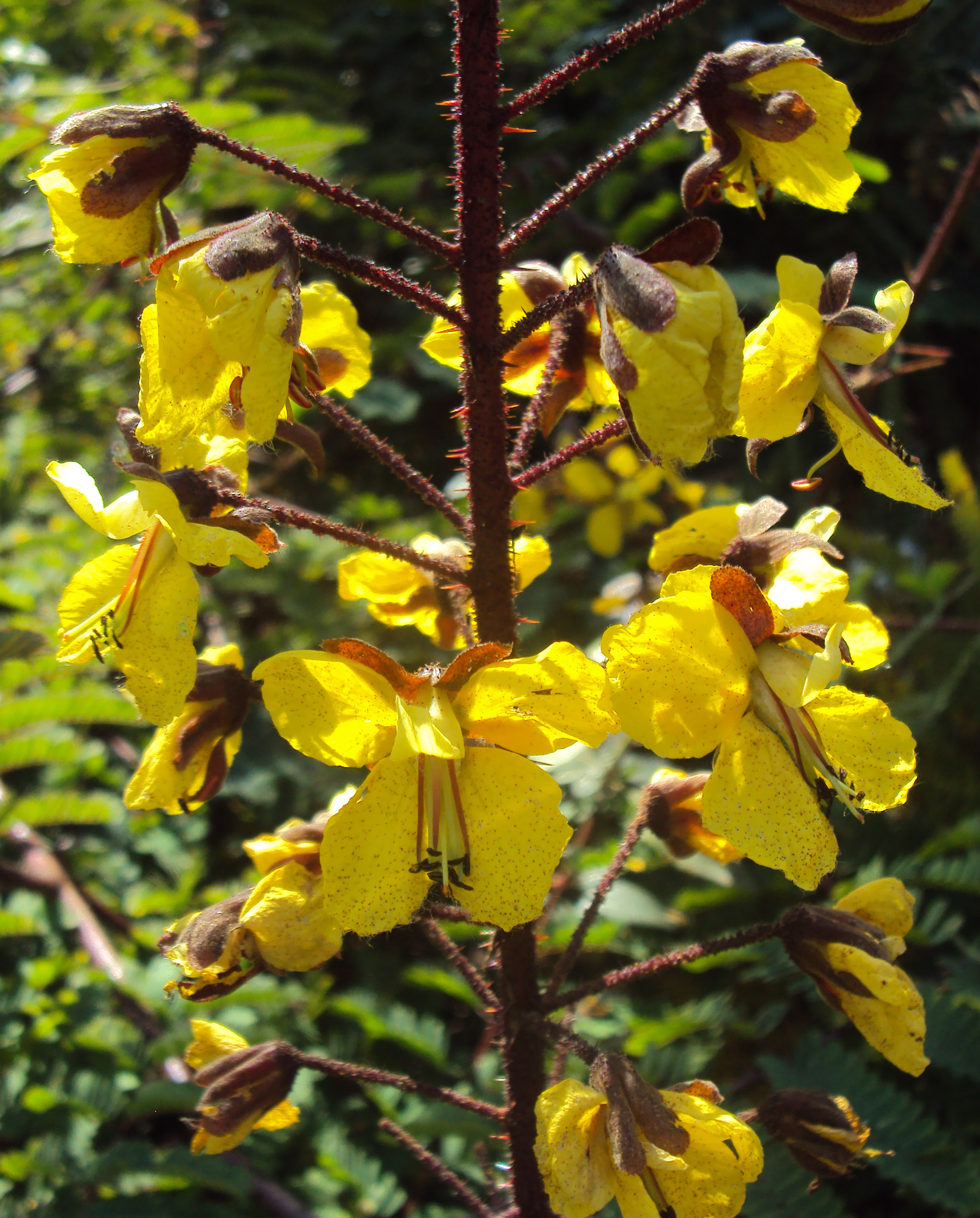

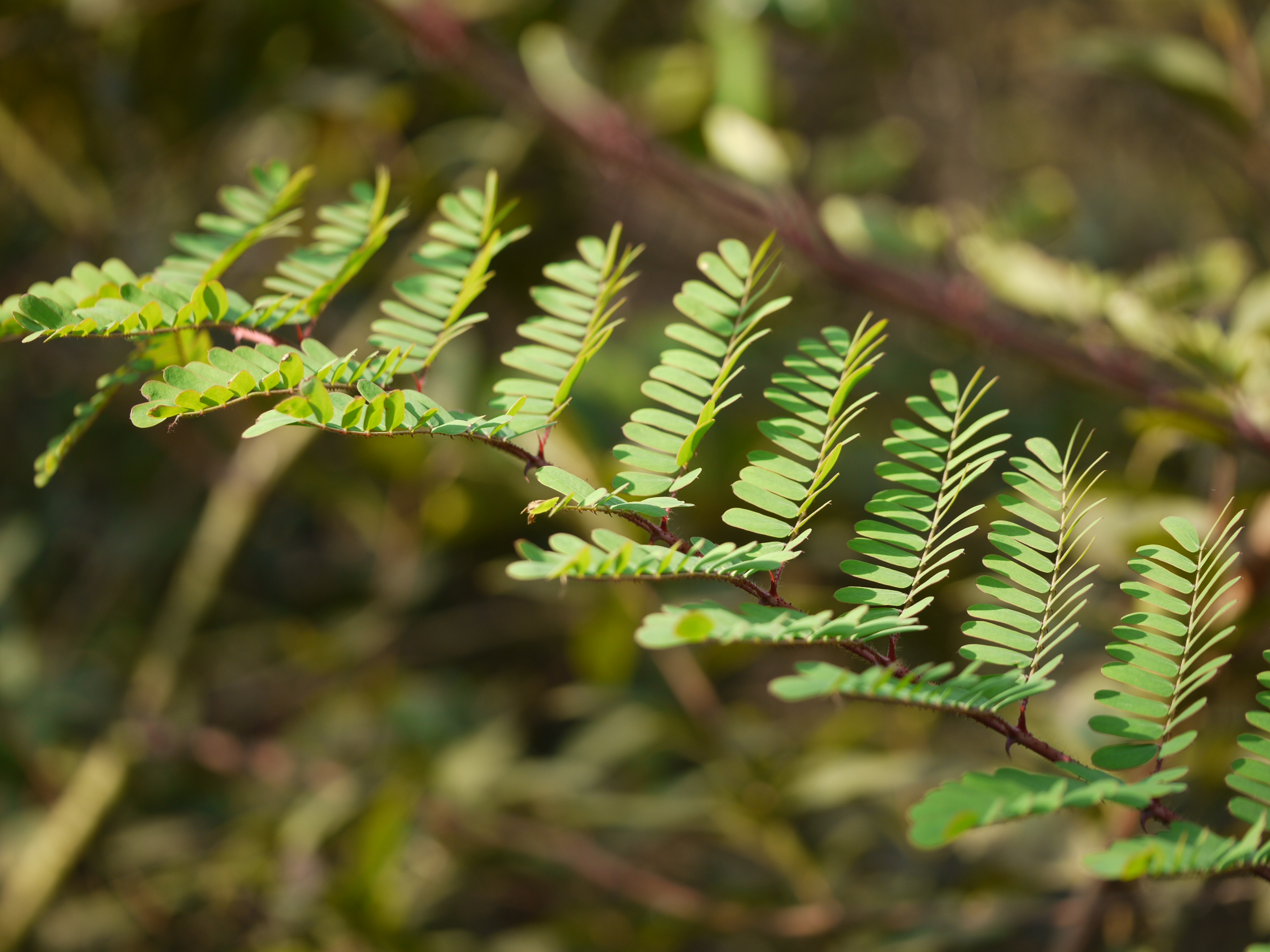

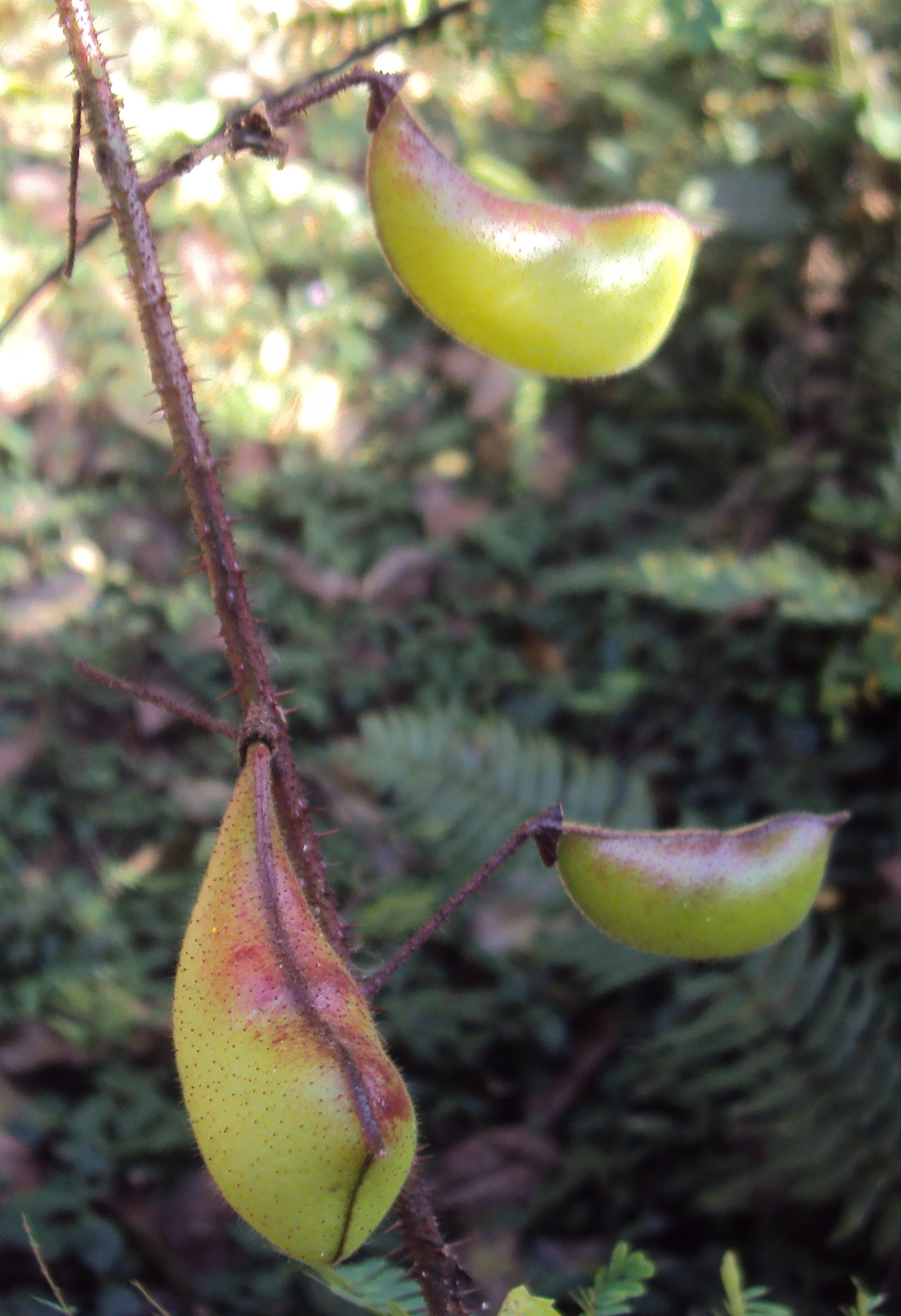

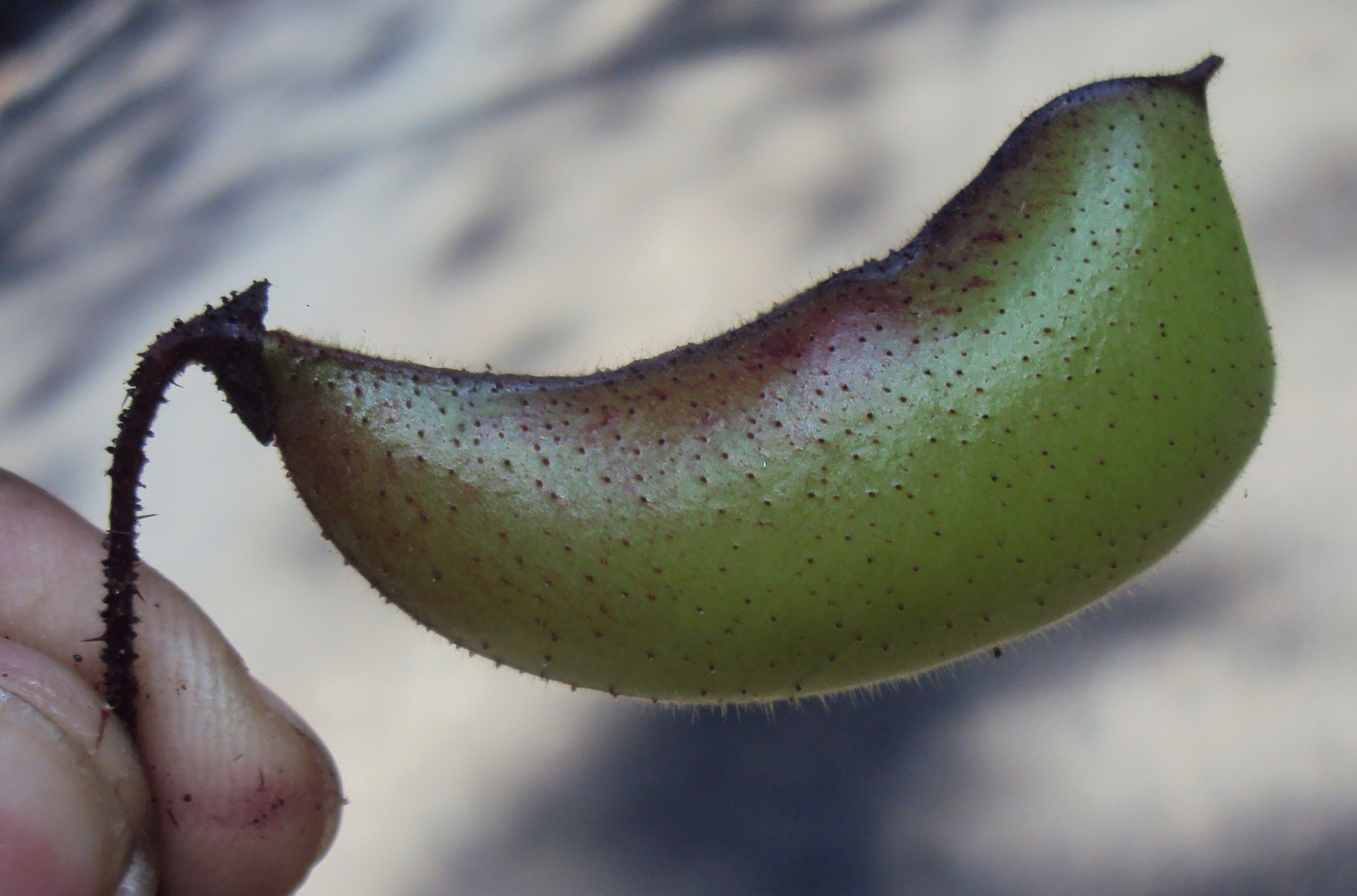

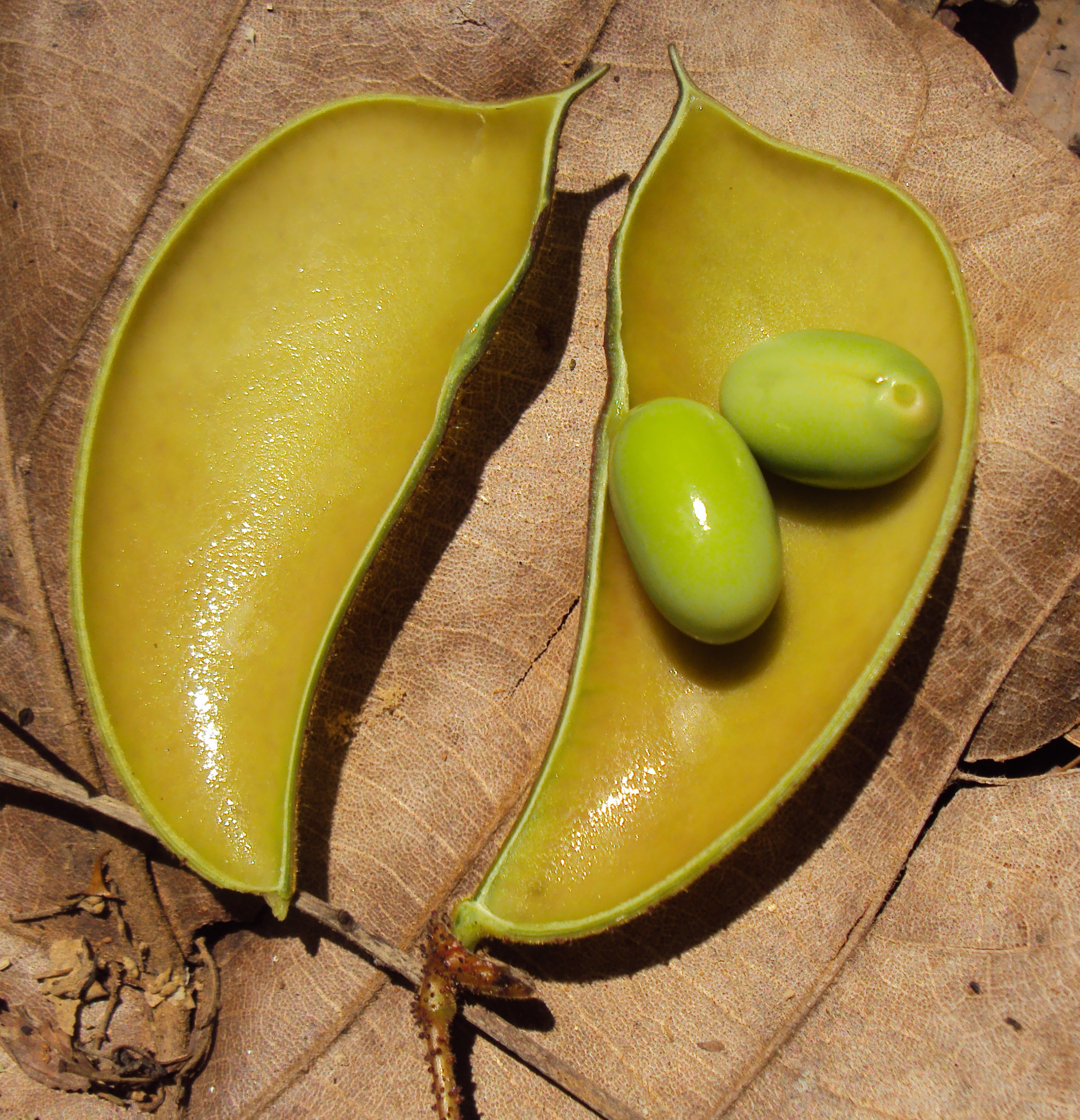
