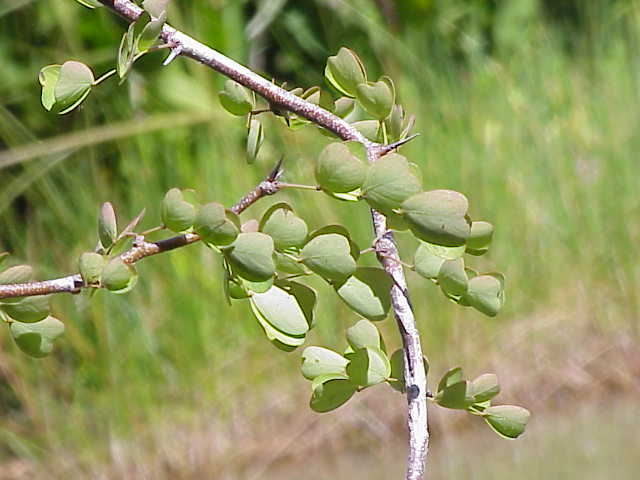

Conservation status
- Least Concern (IUCN 3.1)

Scientific classification
- Kingdom: Plantae
- Clade: Tracheophytes
- Clade: Angiosperms
- Clade: Eudicots
- Clade: Rosids
- Order: Fabales
- Family: Fabaceae
- Subfamily: Caesalpinioideae
- Tribe: Caesalpinieae
- Genus: Haematoxylum
- Species: H. campechianum

Binomial name
- Haematoxylum campechianum L., 1753

Synonyms
- Cymbosepalum baronii Baker

= Haematoxylum campechianum =

Species of plant

Haematoxylum campechianum (blackwood, bloodwood tree, bluewood, campeachy tree, campeachy wood, campeche logwood, campeche wood, Jamaica wood, logwood or logwood tree) is a species of flowering tree in the legume family, Fabaceae, that is native to southern Mexico, and introduced to the Caribbean, northern Central America, and other localities around the world.

The tree was of great economic importance from the 17th century to the 19th century, when it was commonly logged and exported to Europe for use in dyeing fabrics. The modern nation of Belize developed from 17th- and 18th-century logging camps established by the English. The tree's scientific name means "bloodwood" (haima being Greek for blood and xylon for wood).

== Uses ==
Haematoxylum campechianum was used for a long time as a natural source of dye. The woodchips are still used as an important source of haematoxylin, which is used in histology for staining. The bark and leaves are also used in various medical applications. In its time, it was considered a versatile dye, and was widely used on textiles and also for paper.

The extract was once used as a pH indicator. Brownish when neutral, it becomes yellow reddish under acidic conditions and purple when alkaline. In a small demonstrative experiment, if two drops, one of concentrated ammonia and one of logwood extract, are placed close enough, the NH_{3} vapours will change the color of the extract to a purple shade.

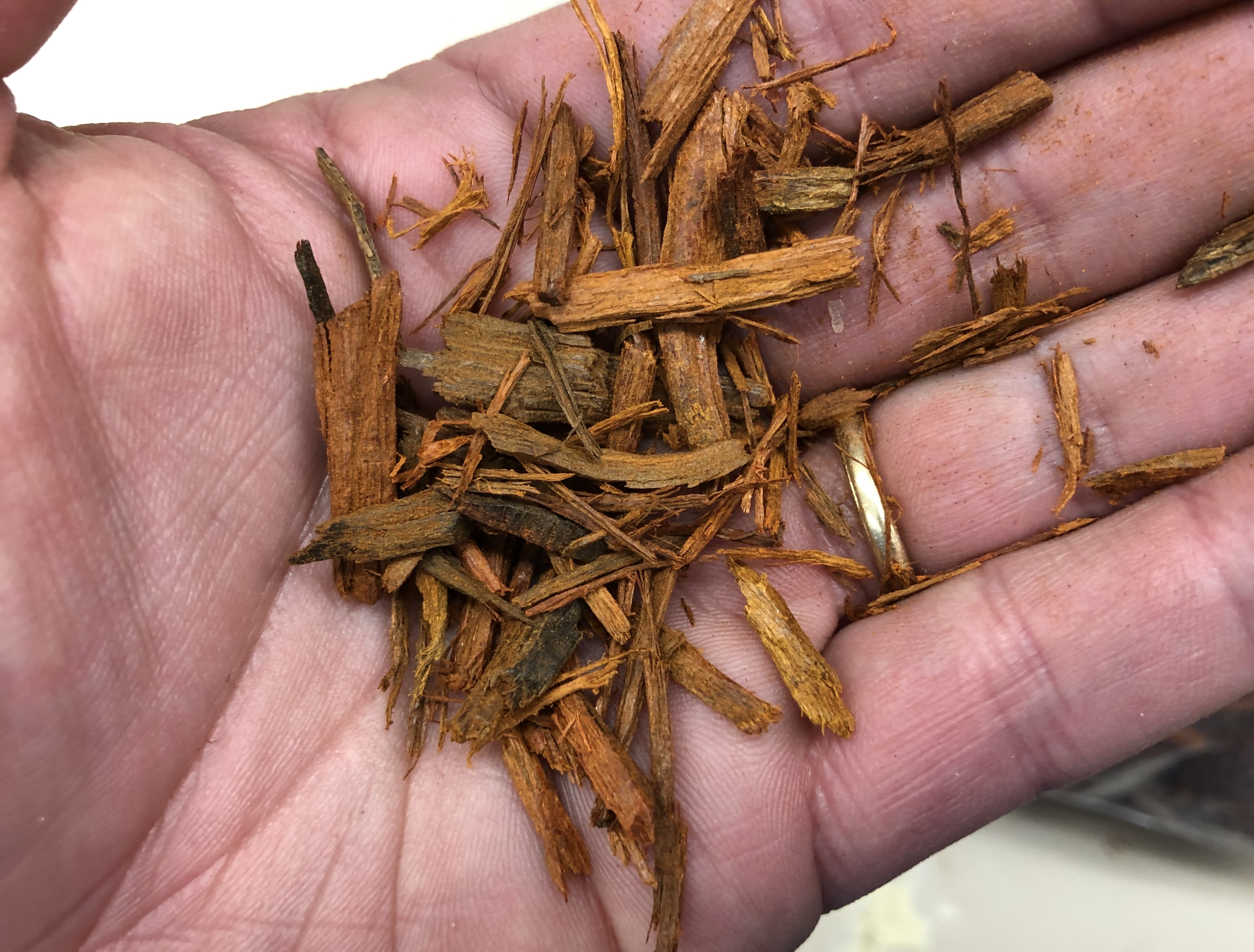
Woodchips to use for histologic staining

== Logwood and pirates ==
Logwood also played an important role in the lives of 17th-century buccaneers and into the Golden Age of Piracy. Spain claimed all of Central and South America as its sovereign territory through the 17th and 18th centuries; despite that, English, Dutch, and French sailors recognized the value of logwood and set up camps to cut and collect the trees for shipment back to Europe. Spain periodically sent privateers to capture the logwood cutters – for example, Juan Corso's 1680 cruise – sometimes in retaliation for buccaneer raids on Spanish cities. Logwood cutters, by then out of work, frequently joined pirate and buccaneer crews to raid the Spanish in return, as Edmund Cooke did after losing two logwood-hauling ships to the Spanish. When Spanish forces ejected a great many hunters and logwood cutters in 1715, they flocked to Nassau and swelled the already-considerable numbers of pirates gathering there. By the mid-1720s logwood cutters had themselves become targets of pirates such as Francis Spriggs, Edward Low, and George Lowther; pirate captains Samuel Bellamy and Blackbeard went further, turning captured logwood-hauling sloops into pirate vessels. Logwood cutting was profitable – "According to a government report, in the four years 1713 to 1716, some 4,965 tons of logwood were exported to England at not less than £60,000 per annum" – but brought in only a fraction of the profits from tobacco and other legal exports, and "was always a minor industry carried on by a few hundred ex-seamen and pirates in a remote corner of the globe".

== Gallery ==
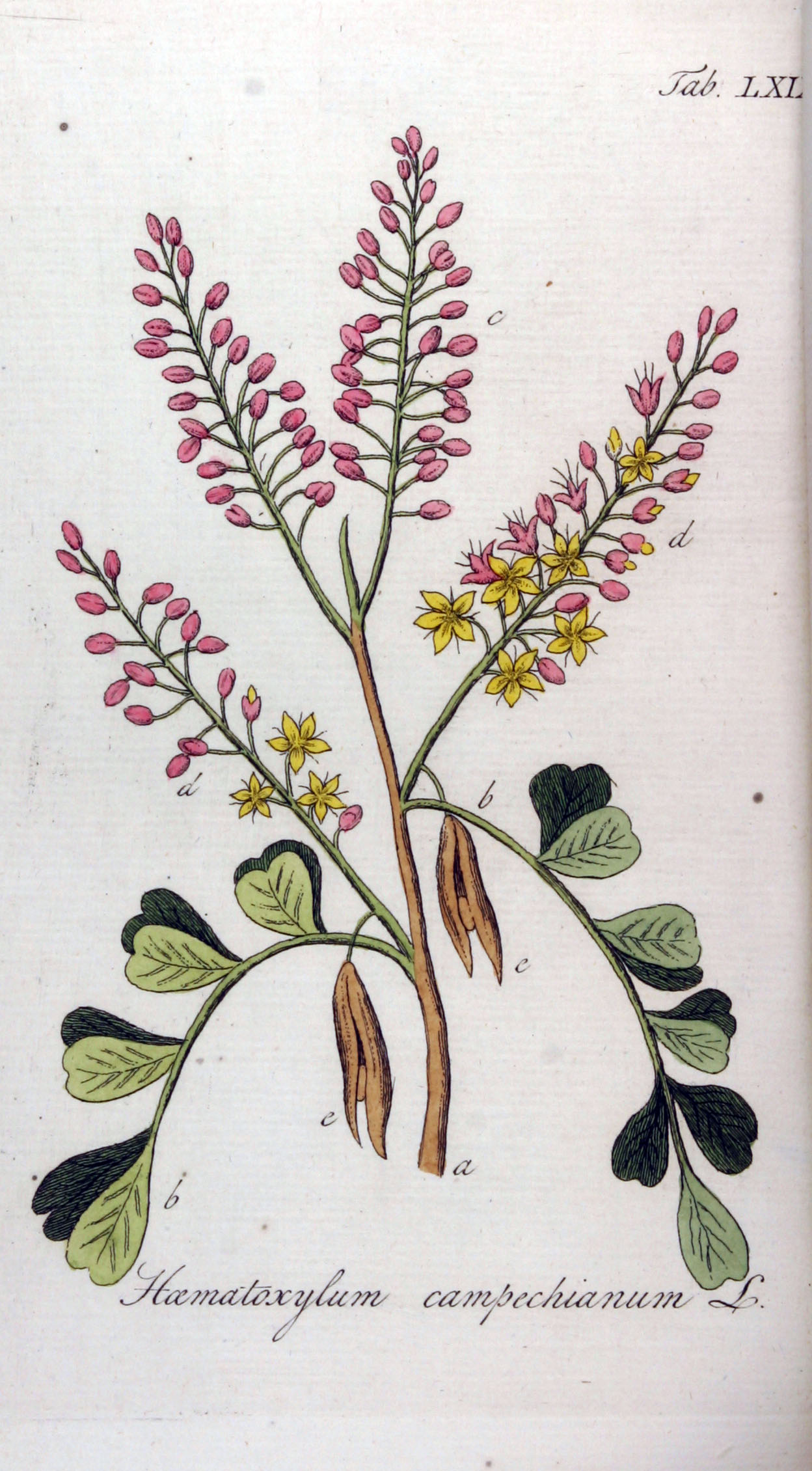

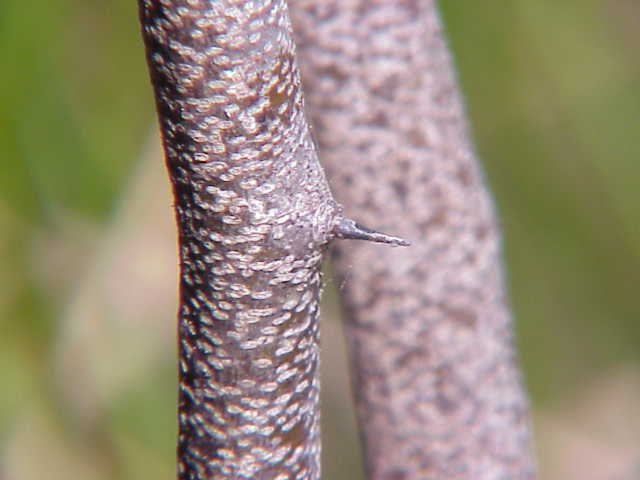

== See also ==
- Haematoxylum brasiletto, known as Mexican logwood, similarly valuable as a dye
