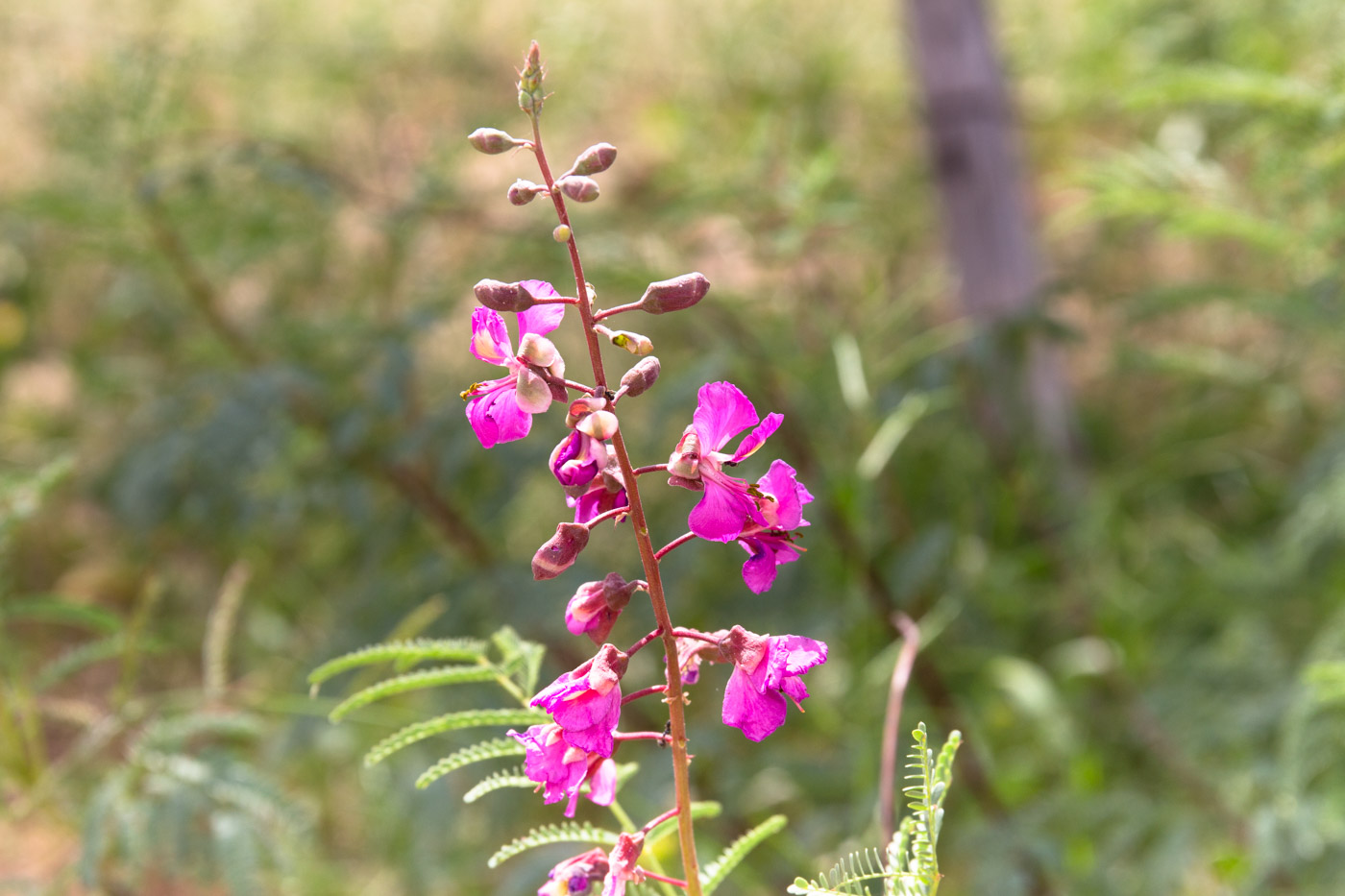
- Gelrebia rubra

Scientific classification
- Kingdom: Plantae
- Clade: Tracheophytes
- Clade: Angiosperms
- Clade: Eudicots
- Clade: Rosids
- Order: Fabales
- Family: Fabaceae
- Subfamily: Caesalpinioideae
- Tribe: Caesalpinieae
- Genus: Gelrebia; Gagnon & G.P.Lewis (2016)

Type species
- Gelrebia rubra (Engl.) Gagnon & G.P.Lewis

Species
- Eight; see text

= Gelrebia =

Genus of legumes

Gelrebia is a genus of flowering plants in the family Fabaceae. It belongs to the subfamily Caesalpinioideae. It includes eight species native to sub-Saharan Africa, which range from Ethiopia to the Democratic Republic of the Congo and South Africa.

== Species ==
Gelrebia comprises the following species:

- Gelrebia bracteata (Germish.) Gagnon & G.P.Lewis
- Gelrebia dauensis (Thulin) Gagnon & G.P.Lewis
- Gelrebia glandulosopedicellata (R.Wilczek) Gagnon & G.P.Lewis
- Gelrebia merxmuellerana (A.Schreib.) Gagnon & G.P.Lewis (Namibia)
- Gelrebia oligophylla (Harms) Gagnon & G.P.Lewis
- Gelrebia rostrata (N.E.Br.) Gagnon & G.P.Lewis
- Gelrebia rubra (Engl.) Gagnon & G.P.Lewis
- Gelrebia trothae (Harms) Gagnon & G.P.Lewis
  - subsp. erlangeri (Harms) Gagnon & G.P.Lewis
  - subsp. trothae (Harms) Gagnon & G.P.Lewis
