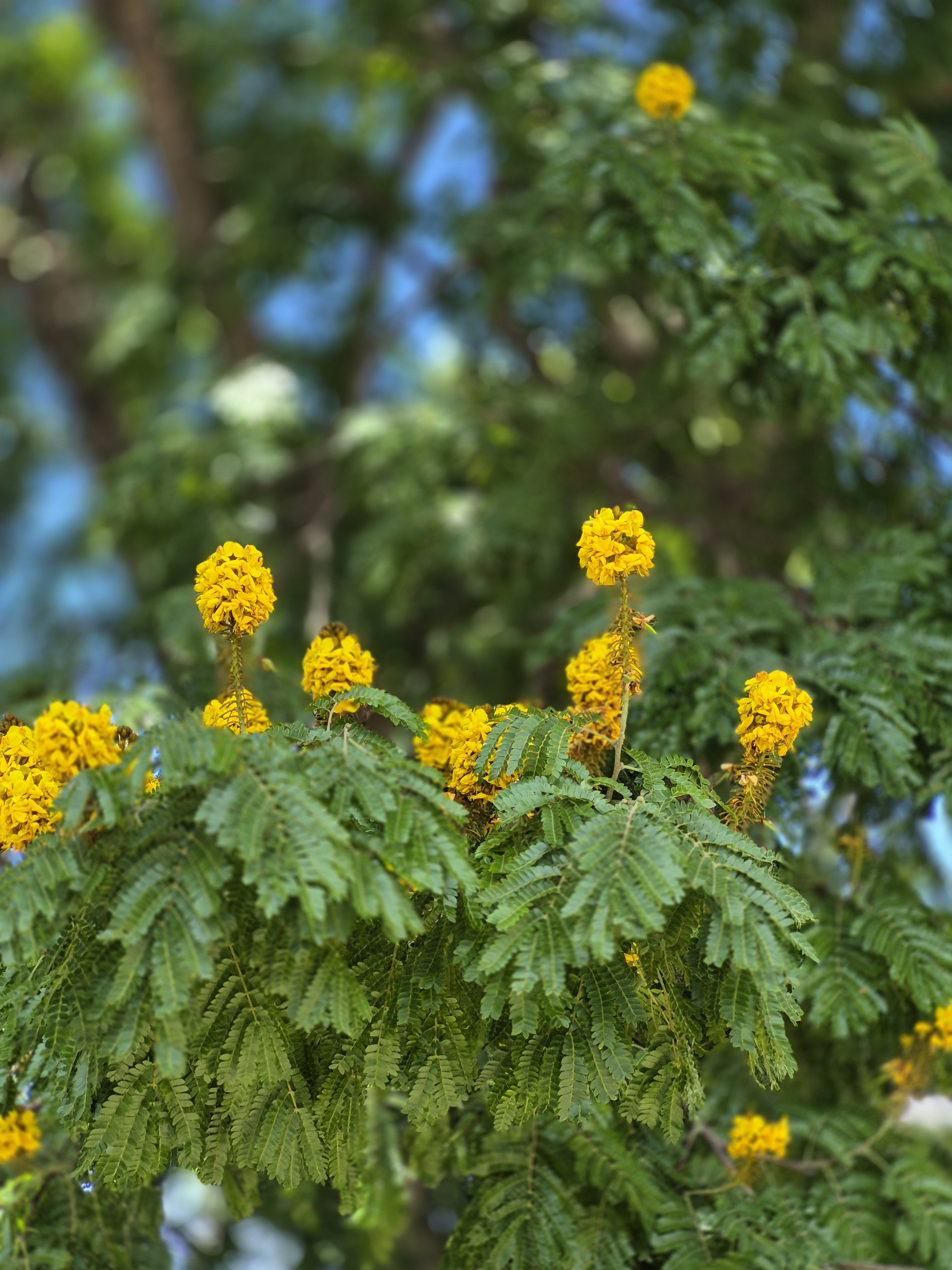
- Cenostigma pluviosum

Scientific classification
- Kingdom: Plantae
- Clade: Embryophytes
- Clade: Tracheophytes
- Clade: Spermatophytes
- Clade: Angiosperms
- Clade: Eudicots
- Clade: Rosids
- Order: Fabales
- Family: Fabaceae
- Subfamily: Caesalpinioideae
- Tribe: Caesalpinieae
- Genus: Cenostigma; Tul. (1843)

Type species
- Cenostigma macrophyllum Tul. 1843

Species
- 15; see text

= Cenostigma =

Genus of legumes

Cenostigma is a genus of flowering plants in the family Fabaceae. It includes 15 species native to the tropical Americas, ranging from Mexico to northwestern Argentina and southern Brazil. It belongs to the subfamily Caesalpinioideae and tribe Caesalpinieae. Cenostigma pluviosa is being investigated as a possible antimalarial medication.

== Species ==
Cenostigma comprises the following species:

- Cenostigma bracteosum (Tul. 1844) E. Gagnon & G. P. Lewis 2016
- Cenostigma eriostachys (Benth. 1844) E. Gagnon & G. P. Lewis 2016
- Cenostigma gaumeri (Greenm. 1912) E. Gagnon & G. P. Lewis 2016
- Cenostigma laxiflorum (Tul. 1844) E. Gagnon & G. P. Lewis 2016
- Cenostigma macrophyllum Tul. 1843
- Cenostigma marginatum (Tul. 1844) E. Gagnon & G. P. Lewis 2016
- Cenostigma microphyllum (Mart. ex G. Don 1832) E. Gagnon & G. P. Lewis 2016
- Cenostigma myabense (Britton 1920) E. Gagnon & G. P. Lewis 2016
- Cenostigma nordestinum E. Gagnon & G. P. Lewis 2016
- Cenostigma pellucidum (Vogel 1836) E. Gagnon & G. P. Lewis 2016
- Cenostigma pinnatum (Griseb. 1866) E. Gagnon & G. P. Lewis 2016
- Cenostigma pluviosum (DC. 1825) E. Gagnon & G. P. Lewis 2016—False brazilwood
  - var. cabralianum (G. P. Lewis 1998) E. Gagnon & G. P. Lewis 2016
  - var. intermedium (G. P. Lewis) E. Gagnon & G. P. Lewis
  - var. maraniona (G. P. Lewis & C. E. Hughes 2010) E. Gagnon & G. P. Lewis 2016
  - var. paraense (Ducke 1925) E. Gagnon & G. P. Lewis 2016
  - var. peltophoroides (Benth. 1870) E. Gagnon & G. P. Lewis 2016
  - var. pluviosum (DC. 1825) E. Gagnon & G. P. Lewis 2016
  - var. sanfranciscanum (G. P. Lewis 1998) E. Gagnon & G. P. Lewis 2016
- Cenostigma pyramidale (Tul. 1844) E. Gagnon & G. P. Lewis 2016
  - var. diversifolium (Benth. 1870) E. Gagnon & G. P. Lewis 2016
  - var. pyramidale (Tul. 1844) E. Gagnon & G. P. Lewis 2016
- Cenostigma tocantinum Ducke 1915
