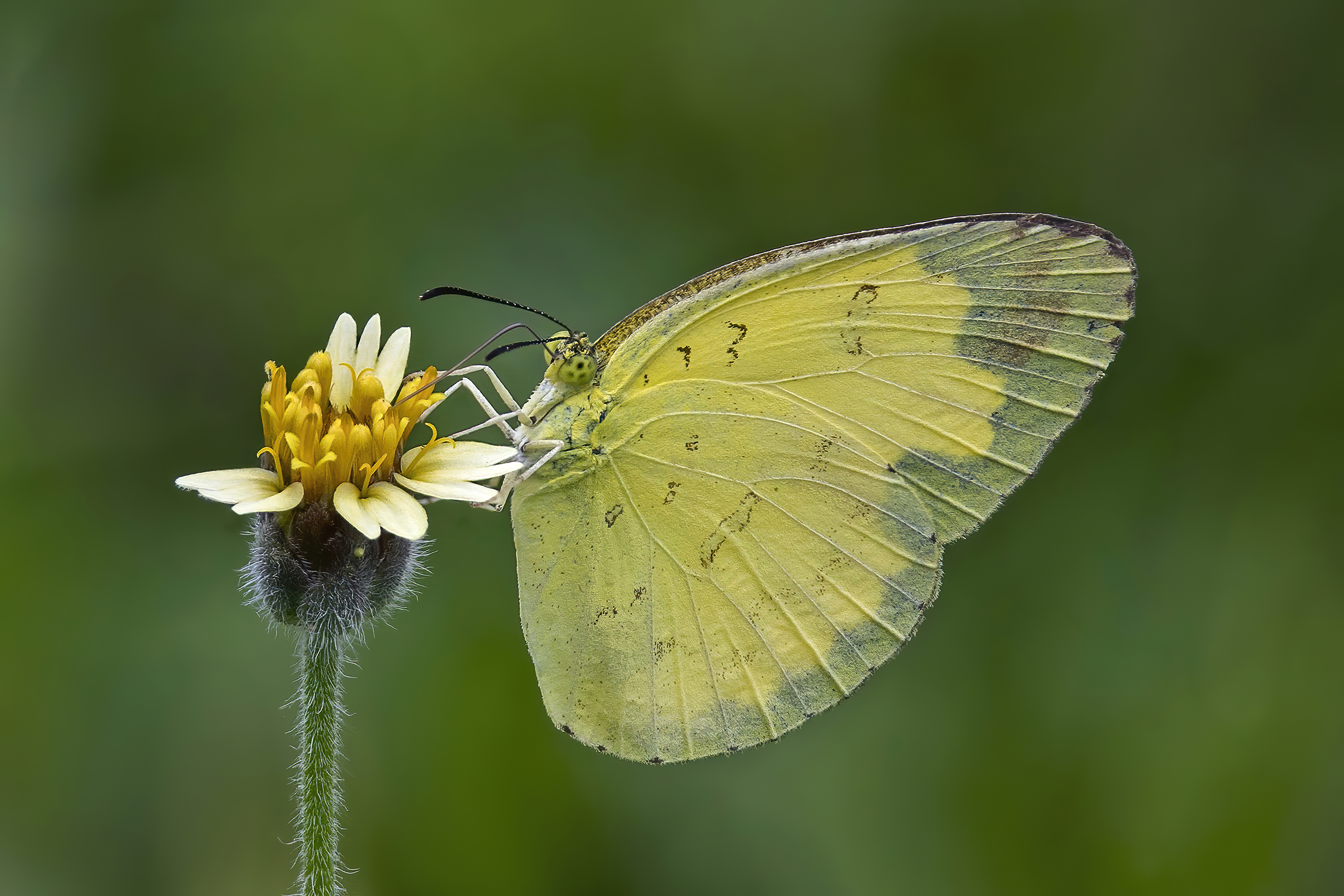
- Phuket, Thailand

Scientific classification
- Kingdom: Animalia
- Phylum: Arthropoda
- Clade: Pancrustacea
- Class: Insecta
- Order: Lepidoptera
- Family: Pieridae
- Genus: Eurema
- Species: E. blanda

Binomial name
- Eurema blanda Boisduval, 1836

Synonyms
- Terias silhetana Wallace, 1867; Terias citrina Moore, [1881]

= Eurema blanda =

Three-spot grass yellow

Species of butterfly

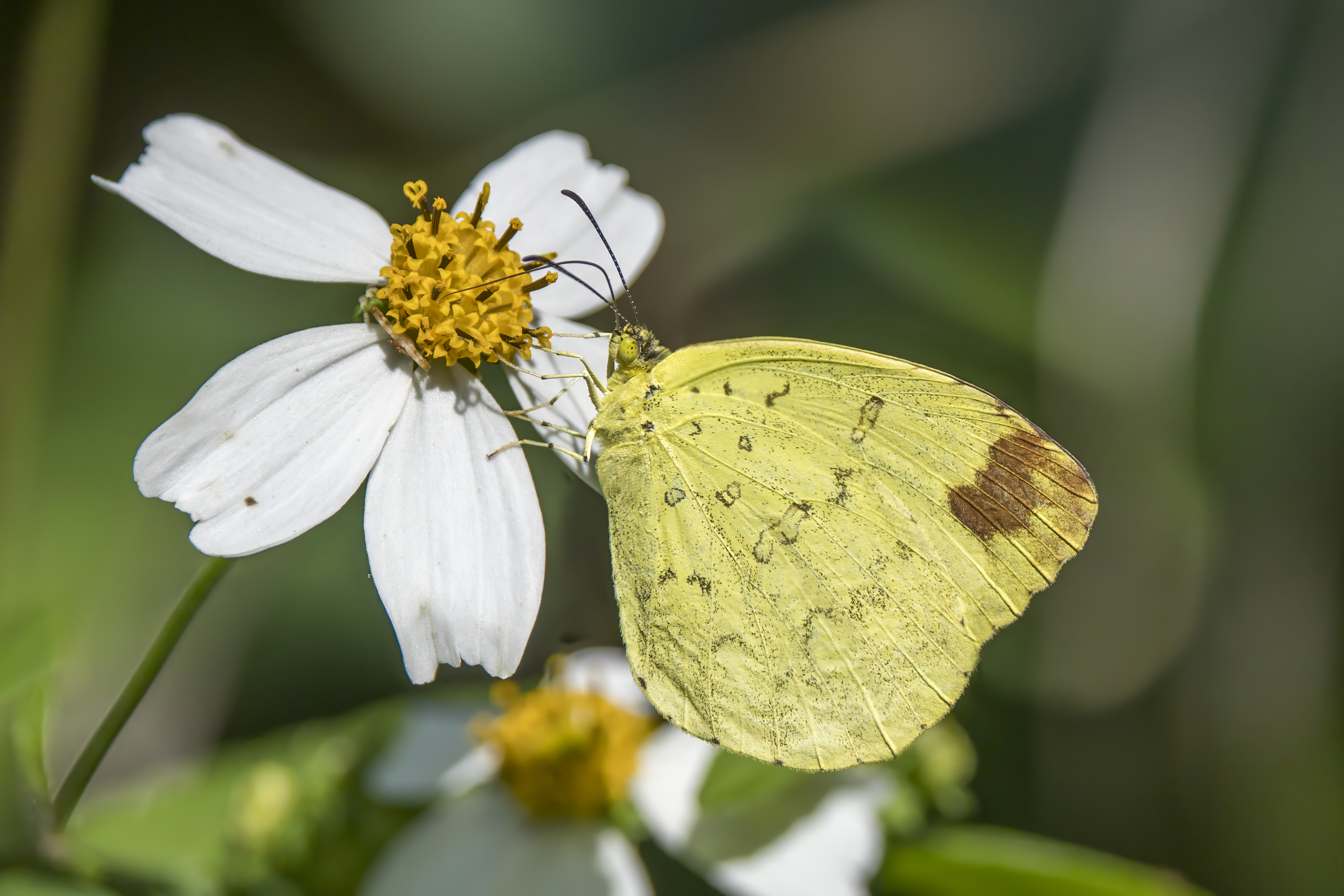
E. b. arsakia on Spanish needle Bidens pilosa)

Eurema blanda, the three-spot grass yellow, is a small butterfly of the family Pieridae which is found in Sri Lanka, India and southeast Asia.

== Description ==
Wet form: Male. Upper-side lemon-yellow. Fore-wing with the outer marginal black band anteriorly broader than in Sri Lankan specimens of Eurema hecabe, the posterior end shorter and its inner edge outwardly oblique. Hind-wing with a moderately broad black outer band. Underside. Both wings with more or less defined ordinary markings of wet form. Fore-wing with three marks in the cell, in addition to the discocellular. No sub-apical patch. Female. Not seen.

Intermediate form: Male. Not seen. Female. Upper-side. Fore-wing with similar outer band to the wet form. Hind-wing with a broad black outer marginal band. Underside with slightly-defined ordinary brown markings as in wet form. Fore-wing with a brown sub-apical patch.

Dry form: Smaller than in wet form. Male. Upper-side. Fore-wing with narrower outer marginal band, its posterior end much smaller. Hind-wing with a slender outer band. Underside. Both wings with similar ordinary markings to the wet form. Fore-wing with a more or less defined sub-apical patch. Female. Upper-side. Fore-wing with a broader black outer band than in male. Hind-wing with a much broader outer band than in male. Underside. Both wings similar to male.

Extreme Dry form: Male not seen. Female. Upper-side. Fore-wing with a broad black outer band, its posterior portion angled obliquely outward from the lower median veinlet. Hind-wing with a moderately broad outer band. Underside. Both wings with ordinary markings as in dry form. Fore-wing with a prominent almost complete quadrate apical brown patch.

— Charles Swinhoe, Lepidoptera Indica. Vol. VII

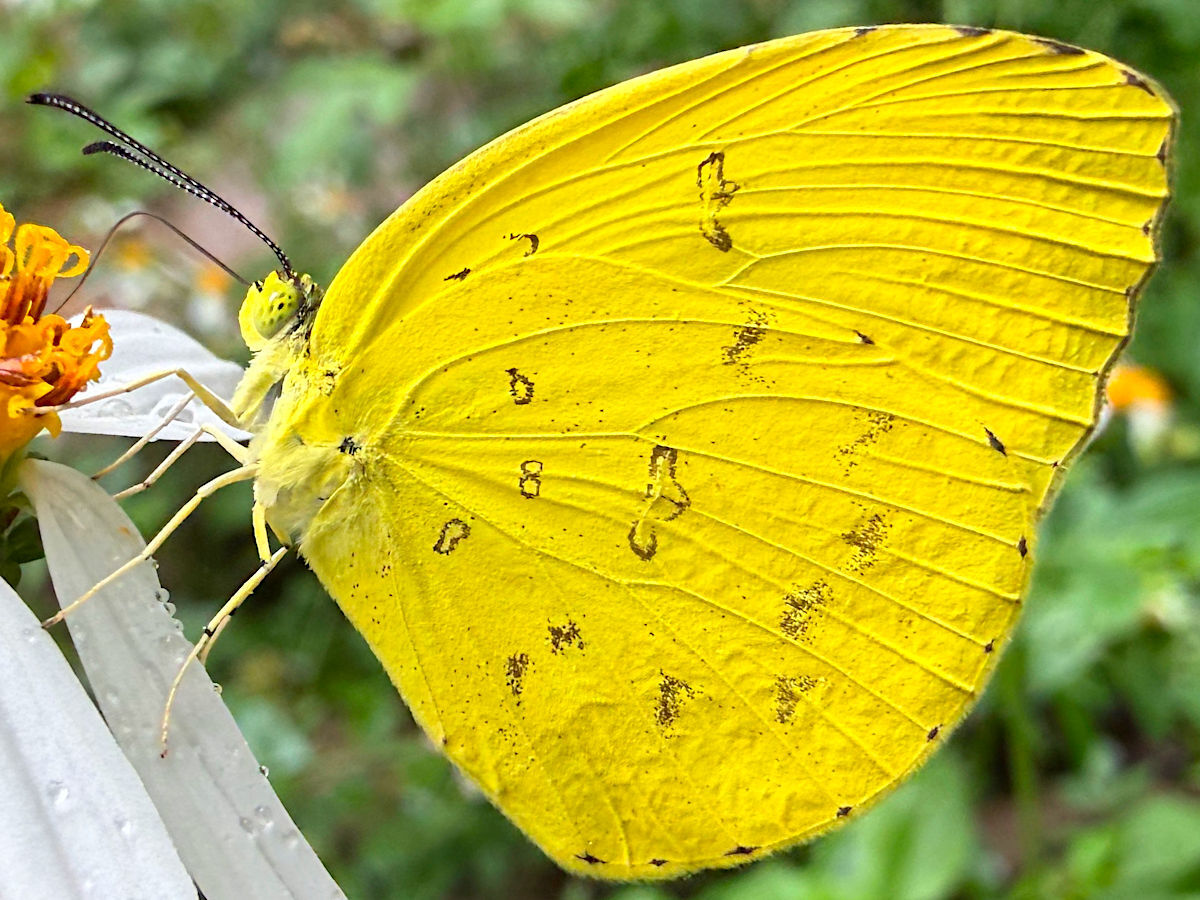
E. b. arsakia wet form, Taiwan

== Life cycle ==
=== Egg ===
Pale yellowish oval-shaped eggs are laid under or upper the leaves and hatch after about three days.

=== Larva ===
They are light green in color in first instar and they become bright green color in the last instar.

=== Pupa ===
After 20 days from the hatching, the larva become pupa. Pupae are light green in color and they become butterflies and emerge from the chrysails after a week.

== Food plants ==
Caesalpinia mimosoides and Bauhinia purpurea.

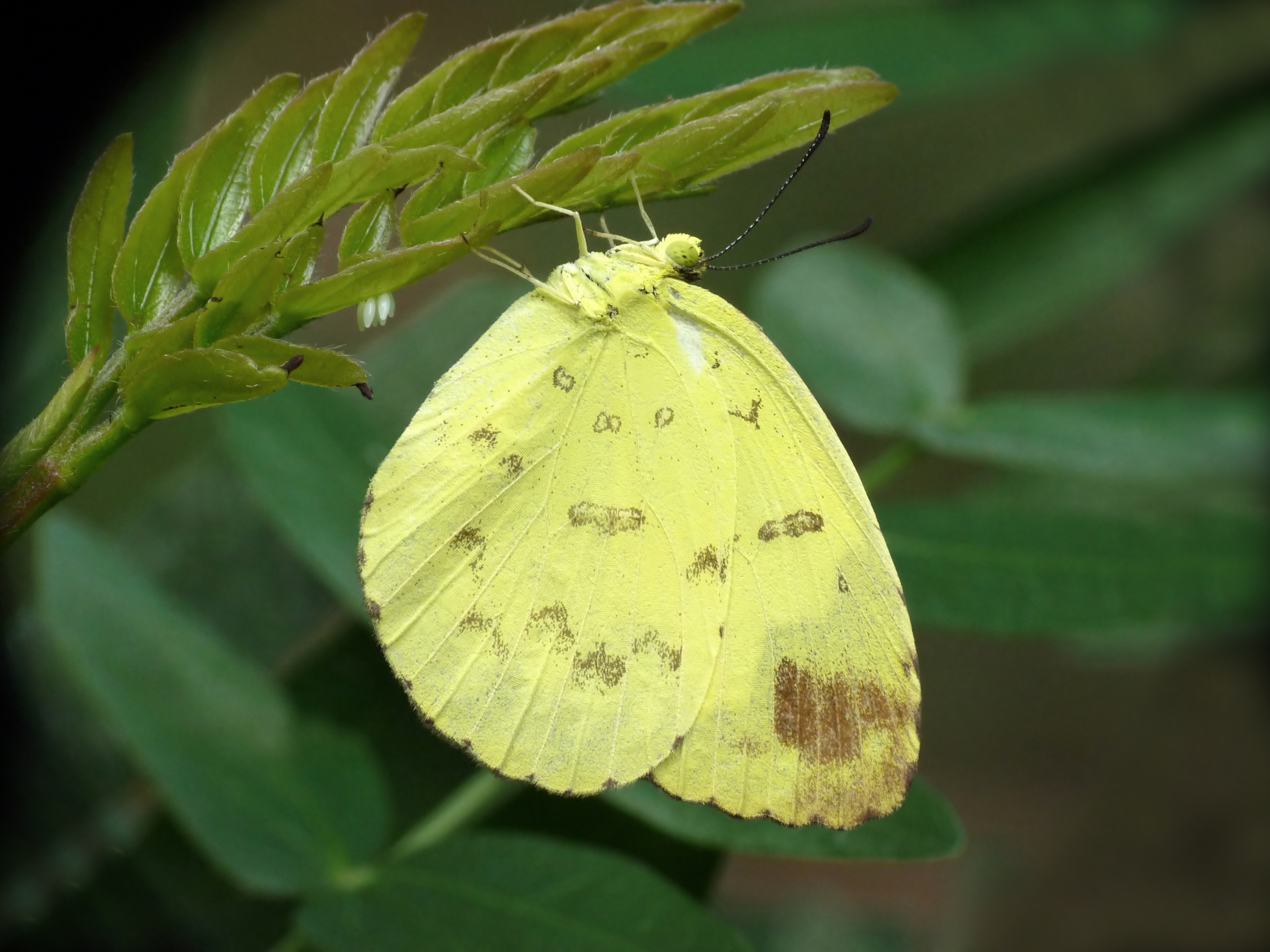
Laying eggs on Albizia julibrissin

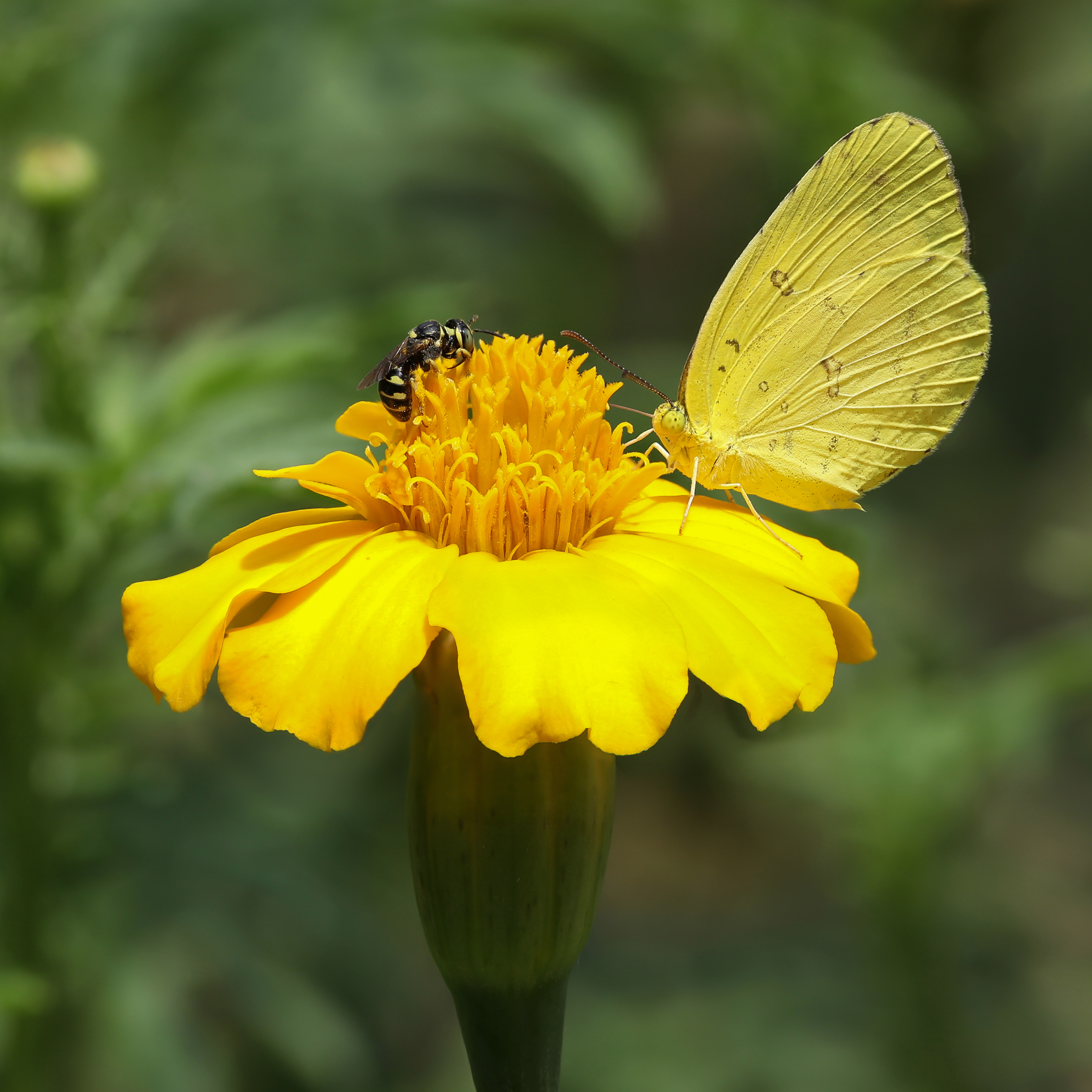
Eeurema blanda and a Vespidae on a Tagetes lucida (marigold), in Laos

== See also ==
- List of butterflies of India
- List of butterflies of India (Pieridae)
