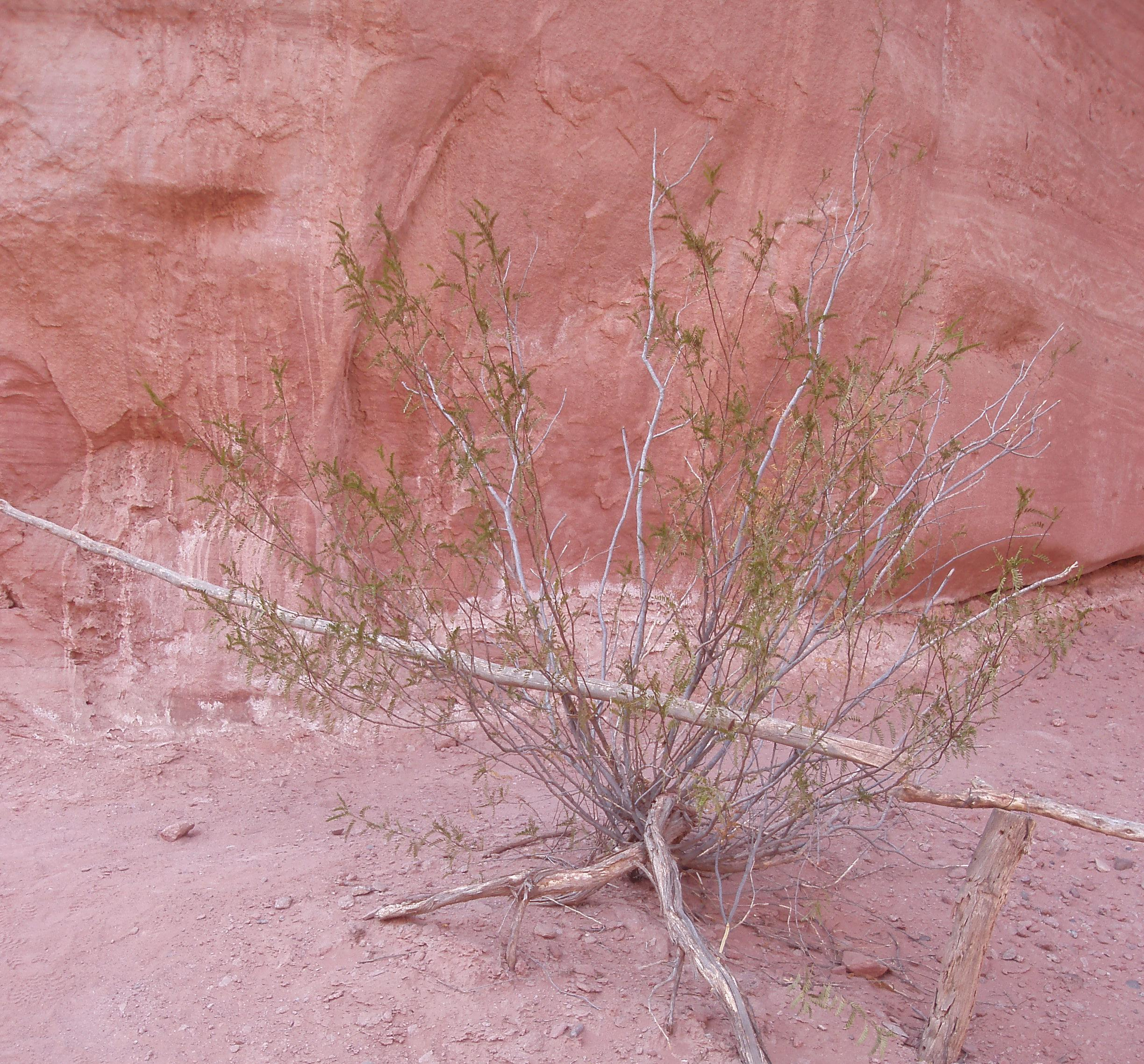
- Zuccagnia punctata in Talampaya

Scientific classification
- Kingdom: Plantae
- Clade: Tracheophytes
- Clade: Angiosperms
- Clade: Eudicots
- Clade: Rosids
- Order: Fabales
- Family: Fabaceae
- Subfamily: Caesalpinioideae
- Genus: Zuccagnia; Cav. (1799)
- Species: Z. punctata

Binomial name
- Zuccagnia punctata Cav. (1799)

Synonyms
- Zuccagnia Thunb.

= Zuccagnia =

Genus of legumes

Zuccagnia punctata is a species of flowering plant in the family Fabaceae. It is the sole species in genus Zuccagnia. It belongs to tribe Caesalpinieae of subfamily Caesalpinioideae.

Plants grow to about 5m tall, have small leaflets with clearly visible punctate glands, yellow 5-merous flowers, and produce leathery, red-haired dehiscent pods bearing a single seed each.

It is found in treeless, scrubby areas up to 2,700 m (8,858 ft) above sea level, and is native only to central Argentina and Chile.

The genus was named in honor of Italian botanist and teacher Attilio Zuccagni (1754–1807), who was the director of the Natural History Museum of the University of Florence in Florence. The specific epithet punctata is Latin, meaning "spotty", and refers to the appearance of the leaf surface.

It was published in Icon. (Cavanilles) vol.5 on page 2 in 1799 by Antonio José Cavanilles.
