= Hererolandia =

Scientific classification
- Kingdom: Plantae
- Clade: Tracheophytes
- Clade: Angiosperms
- Clade: Eudicots
- Clade: Rosids
- Order: Fabales
- Family: Fabaceae
- Subfamily: Caesalpinioideae
- Genus: Hererolandia; Gagnon & G.P.Lewis 2016
- Species: H. pearsonii

Binomial name
- Hererolandia pearsonii (L.Bolus 1920) Gagnon & G.P.Lewis 2016

Synonyms
- Caesalpinia pearsonii L.Bolus (1920)

Genus of legumes

Hererolandia pearsonii is a species of flowering plants in the family Fabaceae. It is the sole species in genus Hererolandia. It is a shrub endemic to Namibia where it grows in Karroo-Namib shrubland. It belongs to tribe Caesalpinieae of subfamily Caesalpinioideae.
