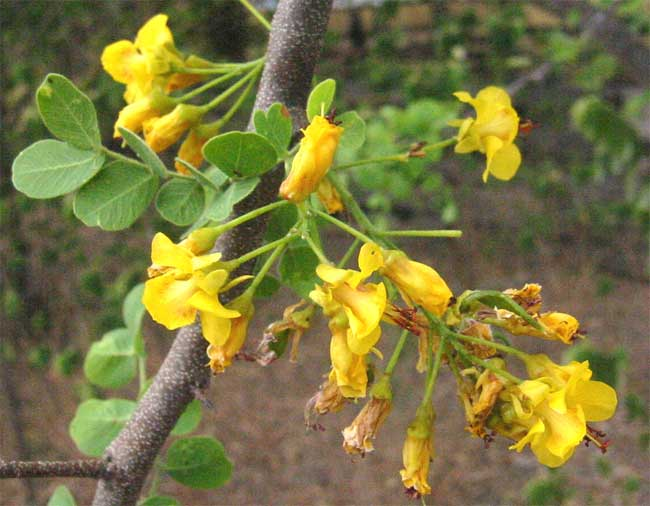
- Haematoxylum brasiletto

Scientific classification
- Kingdom: Plantae
- Clade: Tracheophytes
- Clade: Angiosperms
- Clade: Eudicots
- Clade: Rosids
- Order: Fabales
- Family: Fabaceae
- Subfamily: Caesalpinioideae
- Tribe: Caesalpinieae
- Genus: Haematoxylum; L. (1753)

Type species
- Haematoxylum campechianum L. (1753)

Species
- see text

Synonyms
- Cymbosepalum Baker (1895); Haematoxylon L. (1764), orth. var.

= Haematoxylum =

Genus of plants

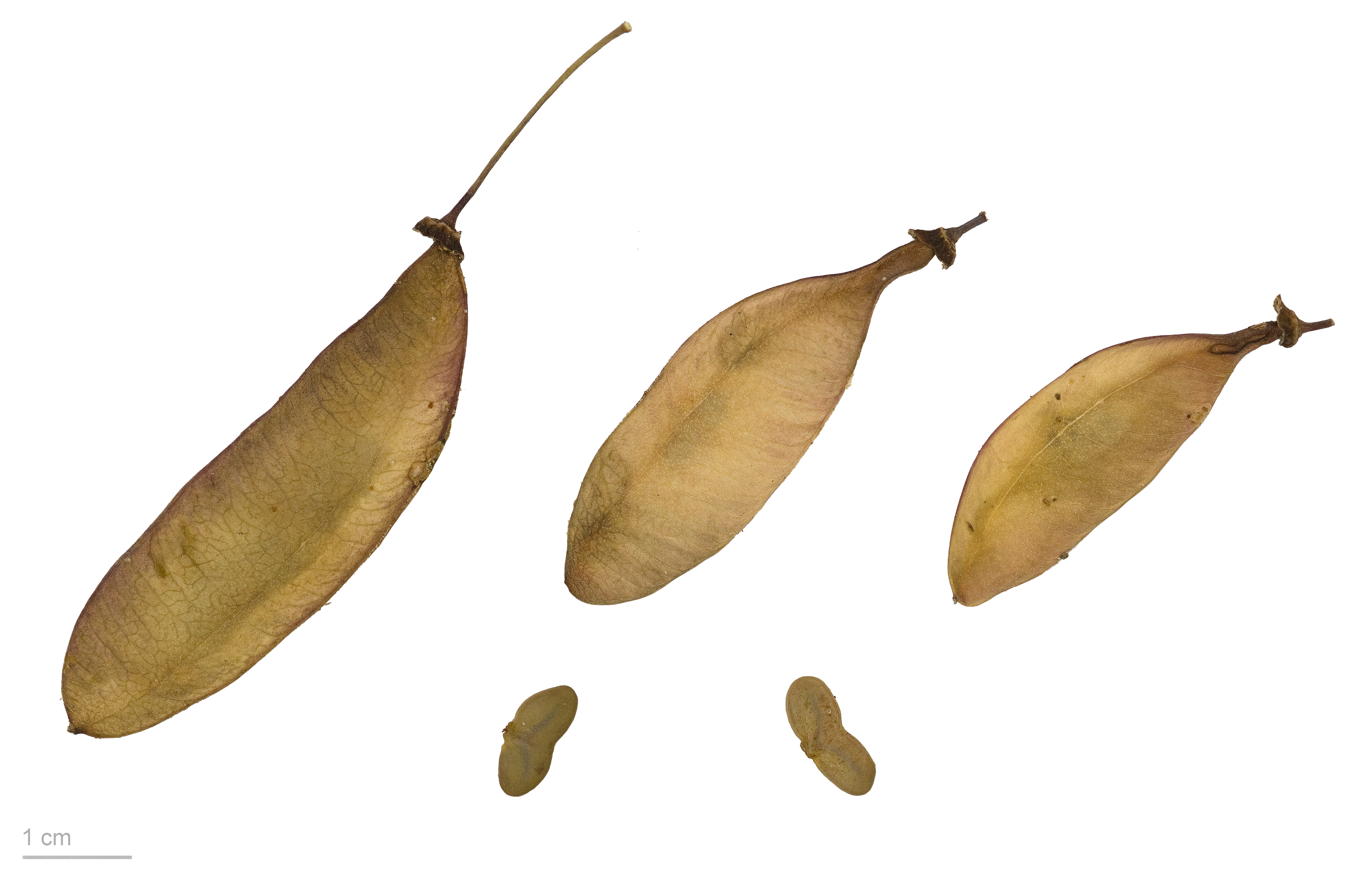
Haematoxylum brasiletto - MHNT

Haematoxylum is a genus of flowering plants in the legume family, Fabaceae, subfamily Caesalpinioideae and the tribe Caesalpinieae. It includes five species, four of which are native to the tropical Americas from Mexico to Colombia, and one to Namibia.

== Species ==
Haematoxylum comprises the following species:

- Haematoxylum brasiletto H.Karst. — Palo Brasil, Brazilette, Peachwood (Mexico, Central America, Colombia, and Venezuela)
- Haematoxylum calakmulense Cruz Durán & M. Sousa (southeastern Mexico)
- Haematoxylum campechianum L. — Logwood (Southern Mexico, northern Central America)
- Haematoxylum dinteri Harms (southern Namibia)
- Haematoxylum sousanum Cruz Durán & J. Jiménez Ram. (western Mexico)
