= Lophocarpinia =

Scientific classification
- Kingdom: Plantae
- Clade: Tracheophytes
- Clade: Angiosperms
- Clade: Eudicots
- Clade: Rosids
- Order: Fabales
- Family: Fabaceae
- Subfamily: Caesalpinioideae
- Tribe: Caesalpinieae
- Genus: Lophocarpinia; Burkart (1957)
- Species: L. aculeatifolia

Binomial name
- Lophocarpinia aculeatifolia (Burkart) Burkart (1957)

Synonyms
- Cenostigma aculeatifolium Burkart (1944)

Genus of legumes

Lophocarpinia aculeatifolia is a species of flowering plants in the legume family, Fabaceae. It is the sole species in genus Lophocarpinia. It is a tree native to Paraguay and northern Argentina. It belongs to tribe Caesalpinieae of subfamily Caesalpinioideae.
