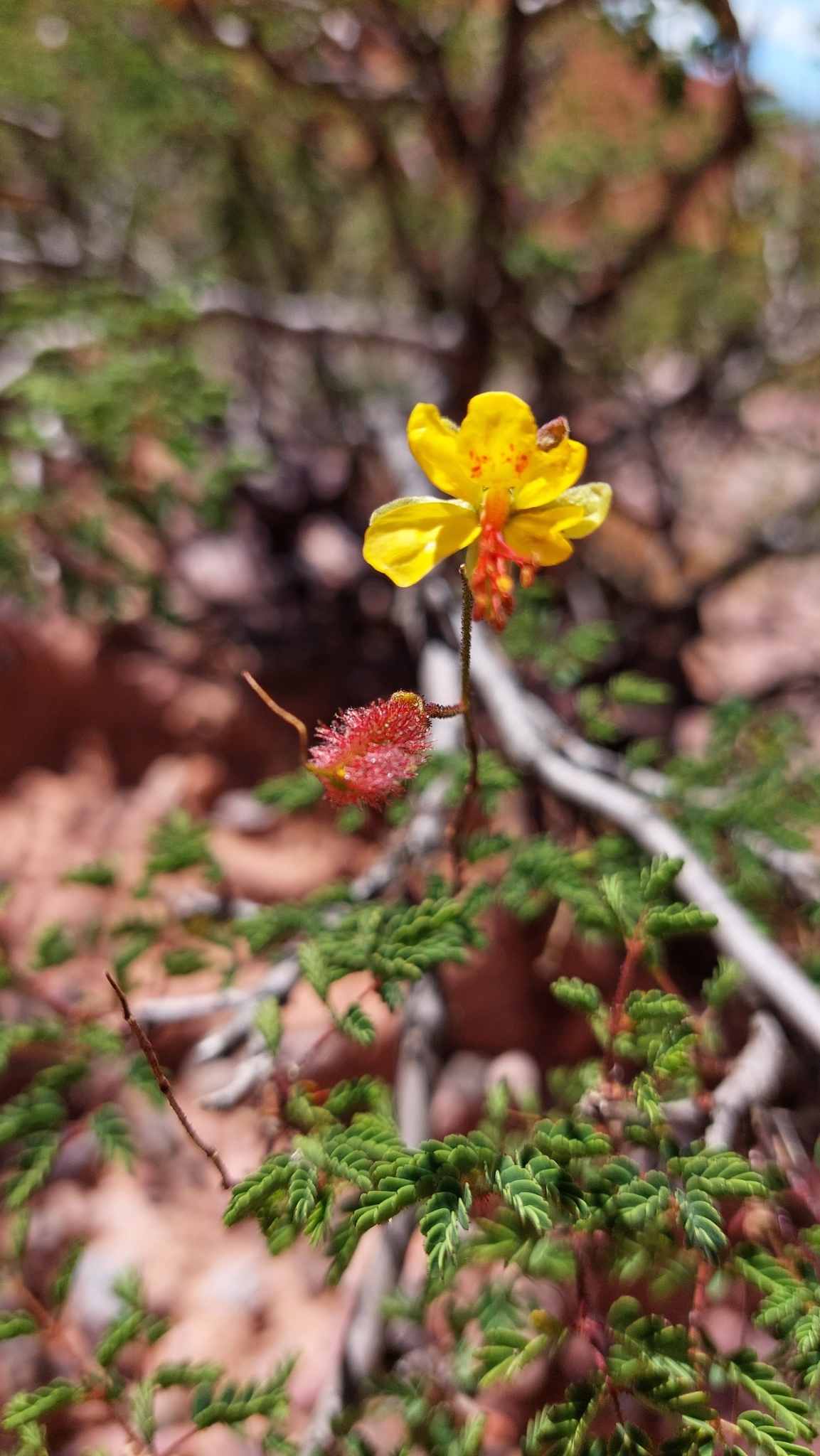
- Arquita trichocarpa

Scientific classification
- Kingdom: Plantae
- Clade: Embryophytes
- Clade: Tracheophytes
- Clade: Spermatophytes
- Clade: Angiosperms
- Clade: Eudicots
- Clade: Rosids
- Order: Fabales
- Family: Fabaceae
- Subfamily: Caesalpinioideae
- Tribe: Caesalpinieae
- Genus: Arquita; E.Gagnon, G.P.Lewis & C.E.Hughes

Type species
- Arquita mimosifolia (Griseb.) E.Gagnon, G.P.Lewis & C.E.Hughes

Species
- See text

= Arquita =

Genus of legumes

Arquita is a genus of flowering plants in the family Fabaceae. It belongs to the subfamily Caesalpinioideae. It includes five species, which range from Ecuador to northern Argentina.

== Species ==
The genus Arquita comprises the following species:

- Arquita ancashiana (Ulibarri) E. Gagnon, G. P. Lewis & C. E. Hughes
- Arquita celendiniana (G. P. Lewis & C. E. Hughes) E. Gagnon, G. P. Lewis & C. E. Hughes
- Arquita grandiflora E. Gagnon, G. P. Lewis & C. E. Hughes
- Arquita mimosifolia (Griseb.) E. Gagnon, G. P. Lewis & C. E. Hughes
- Arquita trichocarpa (Griseb.) E. Gagnon, G. P. Lewis & C. E. Hughes
  - var. boliviana E. Gagnon, G. P. Lewis & C. E. Hughes
  - var. trichocarpa (Griseb.) E. Gagnon, G. P. Lewis & C. E. Hughes
