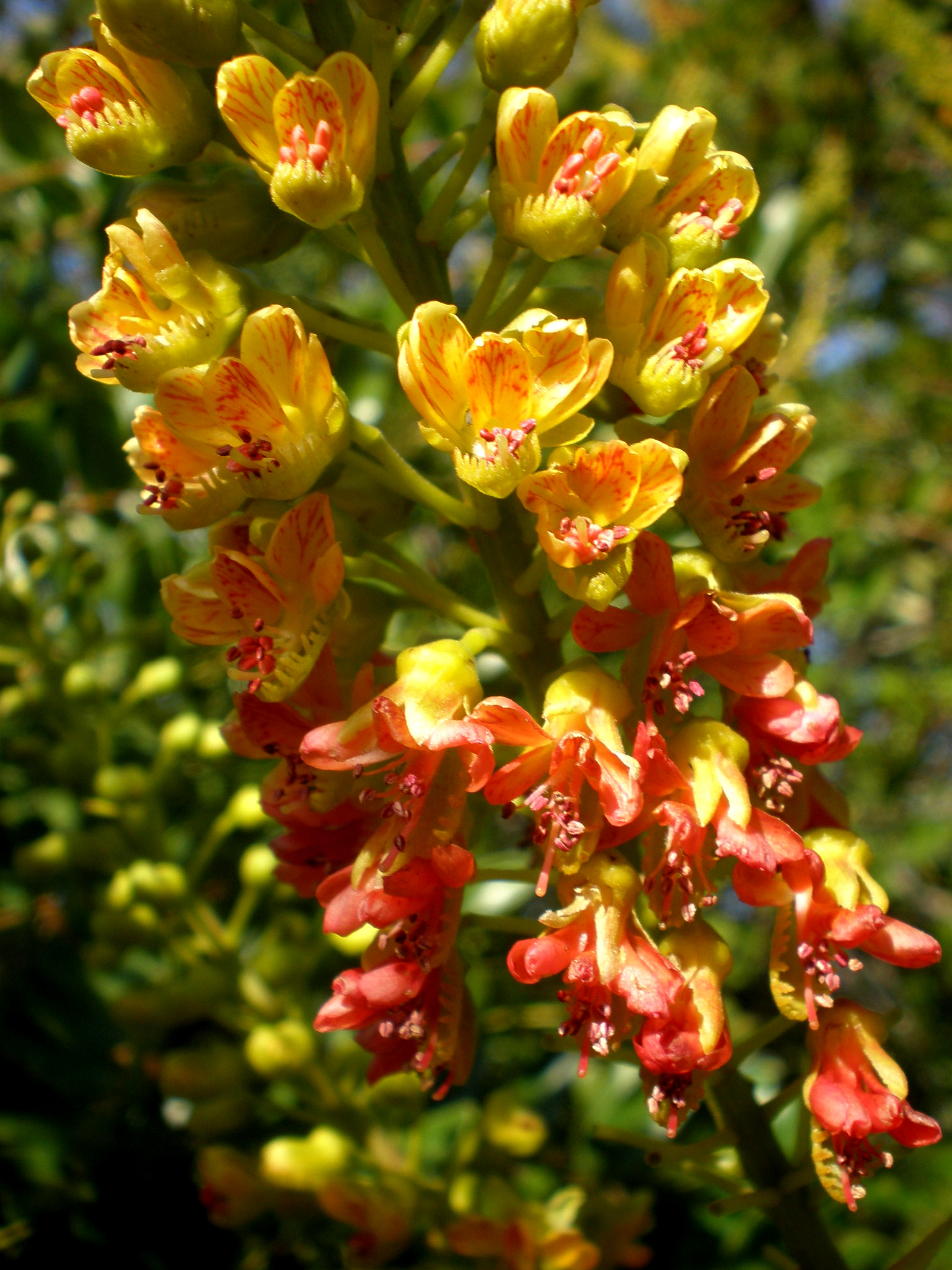
- Tara spinosa

Scientific classification
- Kingdom: Plantae
- Clade: Tracheophytes
- Clade: Angiosperms
- Clade: Eudicots
- Clade: Rosids
- Order: Fabales
- Family: Fabaceae
- Subfamily: Caesalpinioideae
- Tribe: Caesalpinieae
- Genus: Tara; Molina (1810)

Type species
- Tara spinosa (Feuillé ex Molina) Britton & Rose

Species
- 3; see text

Synonyms
- Nicarago Britton & Rose (1930); Russellodendron Britton & Rose (1930)

= Tara (plant) =

Genus of legumes

Tara is a genus of flowering plants in the legume family, Fabaceae. It includes three species of trees and shrubs native to the tropical Americas, from northern Mexico through Central America, the Caribbean, and western South America to Bolivia and Central Chile. Typical habitats include seasonally-dry tropical forest and semi-arid thorn scrub. It belongs to tribe Caesalpinieae of subfamily Caesalpinioideae.

== Species ==
Tara comprises the following species:

- Tara cacalaco (Humb. & Bonpl.) Molinari & Sánchez Och.
- Tara spinosa (Feuillé ex Molina) Britton & Rose — Tara (Peru)
- Tara vesicaria (L.) Molinari, Sánchez Och. & Mayta
