= Stenodrepanum =

Scientific classification
- Kingdom: Plantae
- Clade: Tracheophytes
- Clade: Angiosperms
- Clade: Eudicots
- Clade: Rosids
- Order: Fabales
- Family: Fabaceae
- Subfamily: Caesalpinioideae
- Genus: Stenodrepanum; Harms (1921)
- Species: S. bergii

Binomial name
- Stenodrepanum bergii Harms (1921)

Genus of legumes

Stenodrepanum bergii is a species of flowering plants in the legume family, Fabaceae. It is a perennial subshrub native to northern Argentina. It is the sole member of genus Stenodrepanum. It belongs to tribe Caesalpinieae in subfamily Caesalpinioideae.
