= Biancaea decapetala =

Mauritius thorn

Scientific classification
- Kingdom: Plantae
- Clade: Tracheophytes
- Clade: Angiosperms
- Clade: Eudicots
- Clade: Rosids
- Order: Fabales
- Family: Fabaceae
- Subfamily: Caesalpinioideae
- Genus: Biancaea
- Species: B. decapetala

Binomial name
- Biancaea decapetala (Roth) O. Deg. 1936

Synonyms
- Caesalpinia decapetala (Roth) Alston

Species of legume

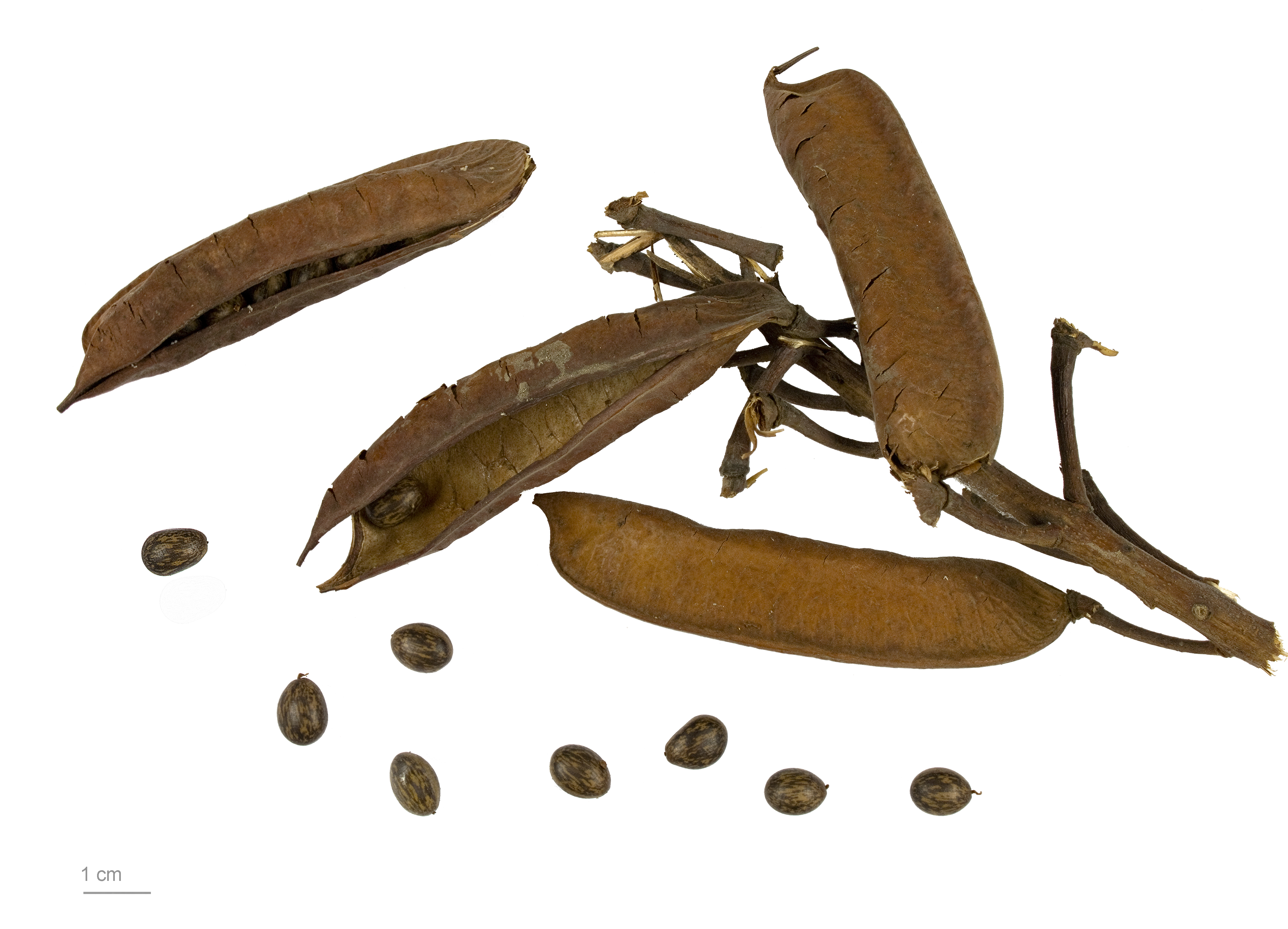
Seed pods and seeds

Biancaea decapetala, commonly known as shoofly, Mauritius or Mysore thorn or the cat's claw, is a tropical tree species originating in India.

== Introduced range ==
B. decapetala has been introduced to Fiji, French Polynesia, Hawai‘i, New Caledonia, Norfolk Island, Australia, China, Japan, Korea, Indonesia, Malaysia, Philippines, Thailand, Vietnam, Mauritius, Réunion, Rodrigues, Kenya and South Africa. It has become a seriously problematic invasive species in many locations.

== Description ==
B. decapetala is as a robust, thorny, evergreen shrub 2–4 m (6.6–13.1 ft) high or climber up to 10 m (33 ft) or higher; often forming dense thickets; the stems are covered with minute golden hair; the stem thorns are straight to hooked, numerous, and not in regular rows or confined to nodes. The leaves are dark green, paler beneath, not glossy, up to 300 mm (12 in) long; leaflets up to 8 mm (0.31 in) wide. The flowers are pale yellow, in elongated, erect clusters 100–400 mm (3.9–16 in) long. Fruit are brown, woody pods, flattened, unsegmented, smooth, sharply beaked at apex, about 80 mm (3.1 in) long.

== Habit and reproduction ==
In Hawai‘i, where B. decapetala has the local name pōpoki, it forms impenetrable brambles, climbs high up trees, closes off pastures to animals and impedes forest pathways. Trailing branches root where they touch the ground. The medium-sized seeds may be dispersed by rodents and granivorous birds and running water.

== Uses ==
Mauritius Thorn has been employed in primate conservation to dissuade apes from entering farmland in West Africa. However, this is no longer suggested due to its invasive nature.
