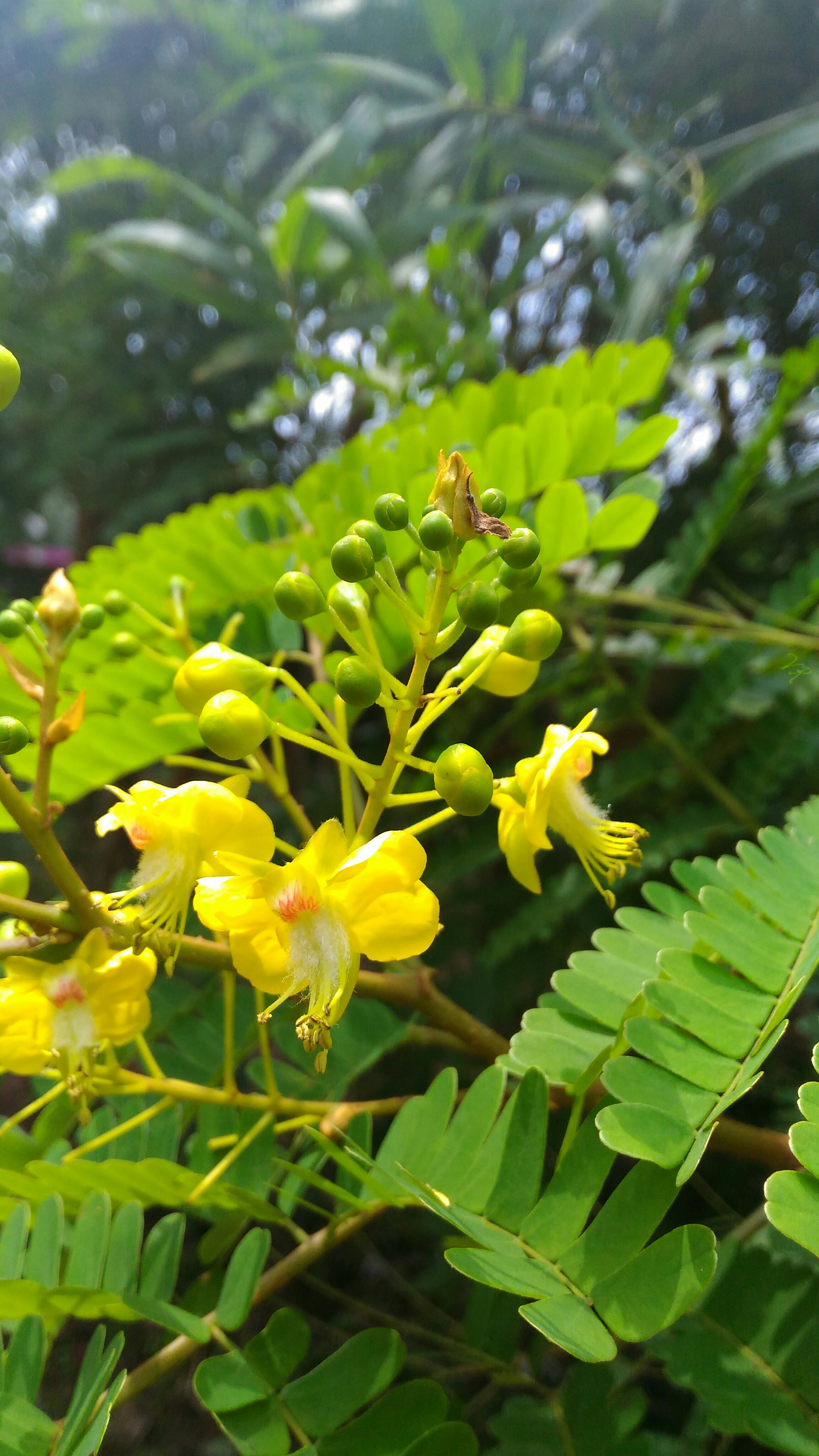
- Biancaea sappan

Scientific classification
- Kingdom: Plantae
- Clade: Tracheophytes
- Clade: Angiosperms
- Clade: Eudicots
- Clade: Rosids
- Order: Fabales
- Family: Fabaceae
- Subfamily: Caesalpinioideae
- Tribe: Caesalpinieae
- Genus: Biancaea; Tod.

Type species
- Biancaea decapetala (Roth) Deg.

Species
- 7; see text

Synonyms
- Caesalpinia sect. Sappania DC. 1825

= Biancaea =

Genus of legumes

Biancaea is a genus of flowering plants in the family Fabaceae. It includes seven species, which range from Yemen to south Asia, Indochina, Malesia, China, Korea, and Japan. It belongs to the subfamily Caesalpinioideae and the tribe Caesalpinieae.

== Species ==
Biancaea comprises the following species:

- Biancaea decapetala (Roth 1821) O. Deg. 1936 – Mysore thorn (India)
- Biancaea godefroyana (Kuntze 1891) Molinari, Mayta & Sánchez Och. 2016
- Biancaea millettii (Hook. & Arn. 1841 [1833]) E. Gagnon & G. P. Lewis 2016
- Biancaea oppositifolia (Hattink 1974) Molinari & Mayta 2016
- Biancaea parviflora (Prain ex King 1974) Mayta & Molinari 2016
- Biancaea sappan (L. 1753) Tod. 1875—Sappanwood (Southeast Asia, Malay Archipelago)
- Biancaea scabrida L.M.Choo
