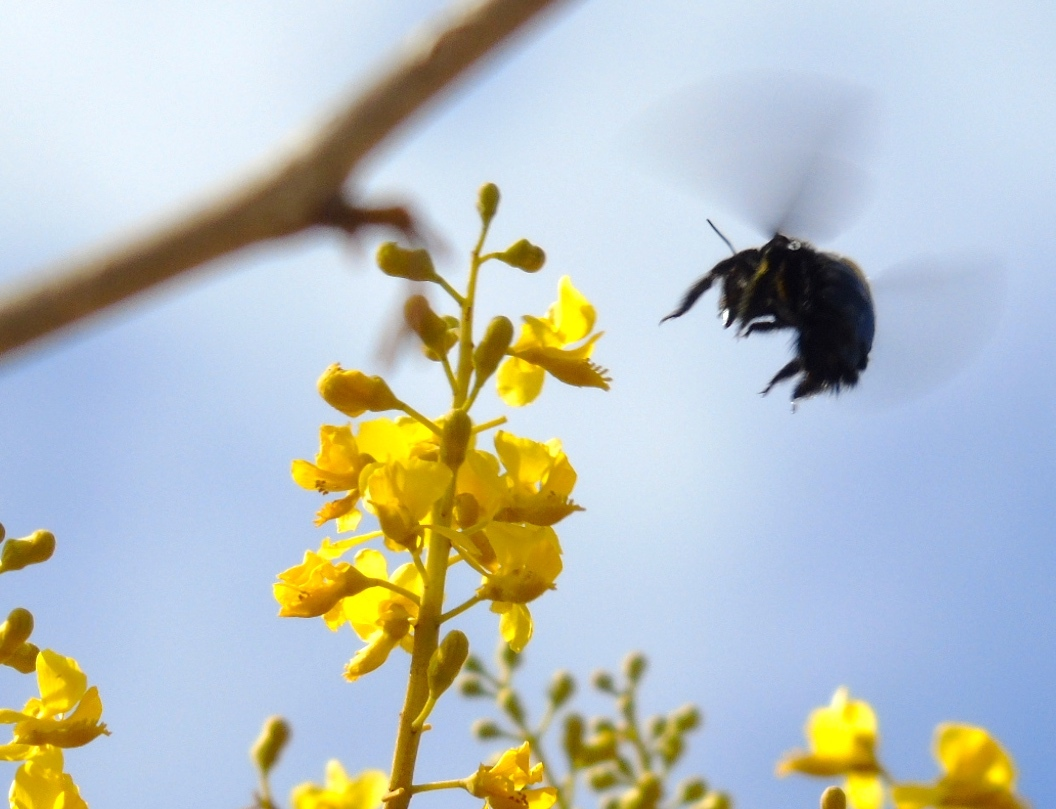
- Coulteria platyloba, Mazatlán, Mexico

Scientific classification
- Kingdom: Plantae
- Clade: Tracheophytes
- Clade: Angiosperms
- Clade: Eudicots
- Clade: Rosids
- Order: Fabales
- Family: Fabaceae
- Subfamily: Caesalpinioideae
- Tribe: Caesalpinieae
- Genus: Coulteria (Kunth 1824) E. Gagnon, Sotuyo & G. P. Lewis 2016

Type species
- Coulteria mollis Kunth 1824

Species
- 10; see text

Synonyms
- Adenocalyx Bertero ex Kunth (1824); Brasilettia (DC.) Kuntze (1891); Guaymasia Britton & Rose (1930)

= Coulteria =

Genus of legumes

Coulteria is a genus of flowering plants in the family Fabaceae. It belongs to the subfamily Caesalpinioideae. It includes ten species native the tropical Americas, from northern Mexico through Central America to Colombia and Venzezuela, including Cuba and Jamaica.

== Species ==
Coulteria comprises the following species:

- Coulteria cubensis (Greenm. 1897) S. Sotuyo & G.P. Lewis 2017 – Cuba, Jamaica, southeastern Mexico, Belize, and Honduras
- Coulteria delgadoana Sotuyo & J.L.Contr. – southwestern Mexico (Michoacán and Guerrero)
- Coulteria glabra (Britton & Rose 1930) J.L. Contreras, S. Sotuyo & G.P. Lewis 2017 – western Mexico
- Coulteria lewisii Sotuyo & J.L.Contr. – southwestern Mexico (Michoacán and Guerrero)
- Coulteria mollis Kunth – eastern Mexico to Colombia and Venezuela
- Coulteria platyloba (S.Watson) N.Zamora – Mexico, Guatemala, and Costa Rica
- Coulteria pringlei (Britton & Rose 1930) J.L. Contreras, S. Sotuyo & G.P. Lewis 2017 – northeastern Mexico
- Coulteria pumila (Britton & Rose 1930) S. Sotuyo & G.P. Lewis 2017 – northwestern Mexico (Sonora)
- Coulteria rosalindamedinae R.Torres, Saynes & Tenorio – south-central Mexico Puebla and Oaxaca)
- Coulteria velutina (Britton & Rose 1930) S. Sotuyo & G.P. Lewis 2017 – northwestern Mexico to Nicaragua
