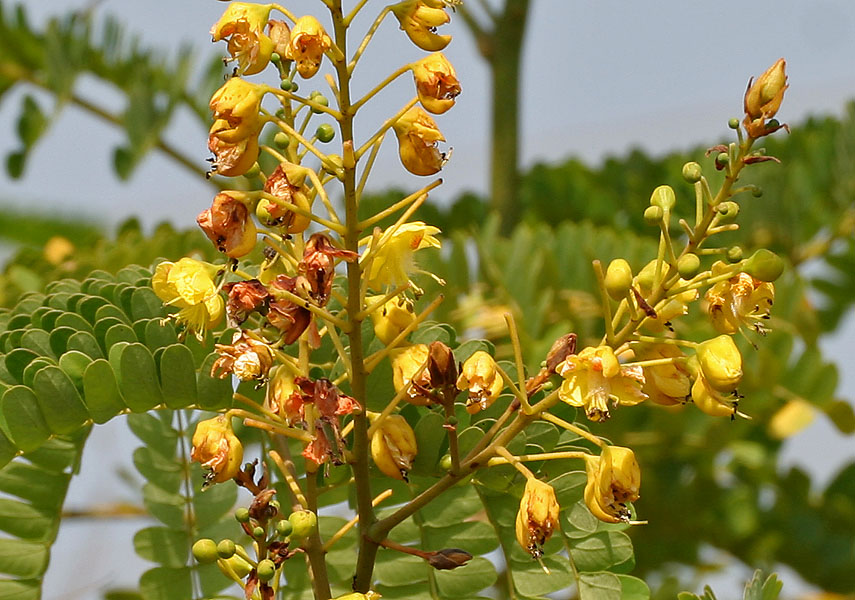
- Biancaea sappan (sappanwood)

Scientific classification
- Kingdom: Plantae
- Clade: Tracheophytes
- Clade: Angiosperms
- Clade: Eudicots
- Clade: Rosids
- Order: Fabales
- Family: Fabaceae
- Subfamily: Caesalpinioideae
- Tribe: Caesalpinieae; Rchb. 1832

Type genus
- Caesalpinia (L. 1753) E. Gagnon & G. P. Lewis 2016

Genera
- See text.

Synonyms
- Ceratonieae Rchb. 1832; Dimorphandreae Benth. 1840; Sclerolobieae Benth. 1865; Moreae Britton & Rose 1930

= Caesalpinieae =

Tribe of legumes

The tribe Caesalpinieae is one of the subdivisions of the plant family Fabaceae: subfamily Caesalpinioideae.

== Genera ==
Caesalpinieae once included many more genera, but modern molecular phylogenetics indicated that these should be transferred to other clades. Caesalpinieae currently comprises the following genera:

- Arquita E. Gagnon, G. P. Lewis & C. E. Hughes 2015
- Balsamocarpon Clos 1846
- Biancaea (Tod. 1860) E. Gagnon & G. P. Lewis 2016
- Caesalpinia (L. 1753) E. Gagnon & G. P. Lewis 2016
- Cenostigma (Tul. 1843) E. Gagnon & G. P. Lewis 2016
- Cordeauxia Hemsl. 1907
- Coulteria (Kunth 1824) E. Gagnon, Sotuyo & G. P. Lewis 2016
- Denisophytum (R. Vig. 1948) E. Gagnon & G. P. Lewis 2016
- Erythrostemon (Klotzsch 1844) E. Gagnon & G. P. Lewis 2016
- Gelrebia E. Gagnon & G. P. Lewis 2016
- Guilandina L. 1753
- Haematoxylum L. 1753
- Hererolandia E. Gagnon & G. P. Lewis 2016
- Hoffmannseggia Cav. 1798
- Hultholia E. Gagnon & G. P. Lewis 2016
- Libidibia (DC. 1825) E. Gagnon & G. P. Lewis 2016
- Lophocarpinia Burkart 1957
- Mezoneuron Desf. 1818
- Moullava (Adans. 1763) E. Gagnon & G. P. Lewis 2016
- Paubrasilia E. Gagnon, H. C. Lima & G. P. Lewis 2016
- Pomaria Cav. 1799
- Pterolobium R. Br. ex Wight & Arn. 1834
- Stenodrepanum Harms 1921
- Stuhlmannia Taub. 1895
- Tara (Molina 1789) E. Gagnon & G. P. Lewis 2016
- Ticanto Adans. 1763
- Zuccagnia Cav. 1799

== Phylogenetics ==
Caesalpinia, as traditionally circumscribed, was paraphyletic, so it was recently recircumscribed to produce many new genera:

- Caesalpinioideae
  - Cassieae (outgroup)
  - Caesalpinieae
    - - Cordeauxia
      - Stuhlmannia
    - - - Lophocarpinia
        - Haematoxylum
      - Hererolandia
      - Clade I
        - - - Denisophytum
            - - Coulteria
              - Tara
          - - Gelrebia
            - - Hultholia
              - Guilandina
              - - Moullava
                - - Biancaea
                  - - - Ticanto (Note: There is some evidence (see) that Ticanto Adans. 1763 might be a valid genus, but it has not yet been formally reinstated as such.)
                      - Pterolobium
                    - Mezoneuron
        - - Paubrasilia
          - Caesalpinia sensu stricto
    - Clade II
      - Cenostigma
      - - - - - Stenodrepanum
              - Hoffmannseggia
            - - Balsamocarpon
              - Zuccagnia
          - Libidibia
        - - - Arquita
            - Pomaria
          - Erythrostemon
