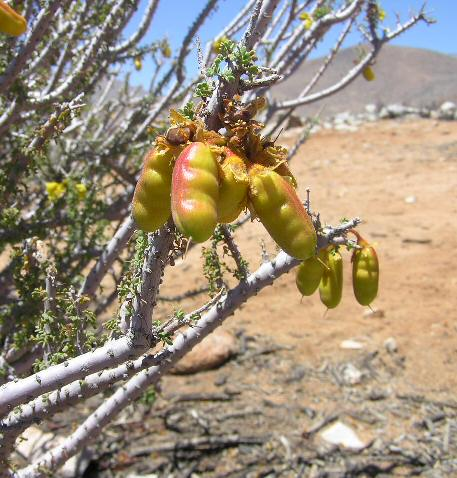

Scientific classification
- Kingdom: Plantae
- Clade: Tracheophytes
- Clade: Angiosperms
- Clade: Eudicots
- Clade: Rosids
- Order: Fabales
- Family: Fabaceae
- Subfamily: Caesalpinioideae
- Genus: Balsamocarpon; Clos (1847)
- Species: B. brevifolium

Binomial name
- Balsamocarpon brevifolium Clos (1847)

Synonyms
- Caesalpinia brevifolia (Clos) Benth. (1865); Sophora microphylla Meyen (1834), nom. illeg.; Zuccagnia microphylla Vogel (1843)

= Balsamocarpon =

Genus of legumes

Balsamocarpon brevifolium, or algarrobilla, is a species of flowering plants in the legume family, Fabaceae. It is the sole species in genus Balsamocarpon. Balsamocarpon belongs to the subfamily Caesalpinioideae and tribe Caesalpinieae. It is endemic to northern and north-central Chile (Atacama and Coquimbo).
