= Gelrebia merxmuellerana =

Conservation status
- Least Concern (IUCN 3.1)

Scientific classification
- Kingdom: Plantae
- Clade: Tracheophytes
- Clade: Angiosperms
- Clade: Eudicots
- Clade: Rosids
- Order: Fabales
- Family: Fabaceae
- Subfamily: Caesalpinioideae
- Genus: Gelrebia
- Species: G. merxmuellerana

Binomial name
- Gelrebia merxmuellerana (A.Schreib.) Gagnon & G.P.Lewis

Synonyms
- Caesalpinia merxmuellerana A.Schreib.

Species of legume

Gelrebia merxmuellerana is a species of legume in the family Fabaceae. It is found only in Namibia.
