= Stuhlmannia =

Conservation status
- Least Concern (IUCN 3.1)

Scientific classification
- Kingdom: Plantae
- Clade: Tracheophytes
- Clade: Angiosperms
- Clade: Eudicots
- Clade: Rosids
- Order: Fabales
- Family: Fabaceae
- Subfamily: Caesalpinioideae
- Genus: Stuhlmannia; Taub. (1895)
- Species: S. moavi

Binomial name
- Stuhlmannia moavi Taub. (1895)

Synonyms
- Caesalpinia dalei Brenan & J.B.Gillett (1963); Caesalpinia insolita (Harms) Brenan & J.B.Gillett (1963); Hoffmannseggia insolita Harms (1936)

Genus of legumes

Stuhlmannia moavi is a species of flowering plants in the legume family, Fabaceae. It is the only species in the genus Stuhlmannia. It is a tree native to Kenya, Tanzania, and Madagascar, where it grows in seasonally-dry tropical forest, woodland on limestone, and in riverine forest. The genus belongs to tribe Caesalpinieae in subfamily Caesalpinioideae.
