= Ticanto =

Scientific classification
- Kingdom: Plantae
- Clade: Tracheophytes
- Clade: Angiosperms
- Clade: Eudicots
- Clade: Rosids
- Order: Fabales
- Family: Fabaceae
- Genus: Ticanto; Adans. (1763)

Species
- 9; see text

Genus of plants

Ticanto is a genus of flowering plants in the pea family (Fabaceae). It includes nine species which range from India through Indochina, southern China, Japan, Malesia, and Papuasia to Queensland.

Nine species are accepted:

- Ticanto caesia (Hand.-Mazz.) R.Clark & Gagnon
- Ticanto crista (L.) R.Clark & Gagnon
- Ticanto elliptifolia (S.J.Li, Z.Y.Chen & D.X.Zhang) R.Clark & Gagnon
- Ticanto magnifoliolata (F.P.Metcalf) R.Clark & Gagnon
- Ticanto rhombifolia (J.E.Vidal) R.Clark & Gagnon
- Ticanto sinensis (Hemsl.) R.Clark & Gagnon
- Ticanto szechuenensis (Craib) R.Clark & Gagnon
- Ticanto vernalis (Champ. ex Benth.) R.Clark & Gagnon
- Ticanto yunnanensis (S.J.Li, D.X.Zhang & Z.Y.Chen) R.Clark & Gagnon
