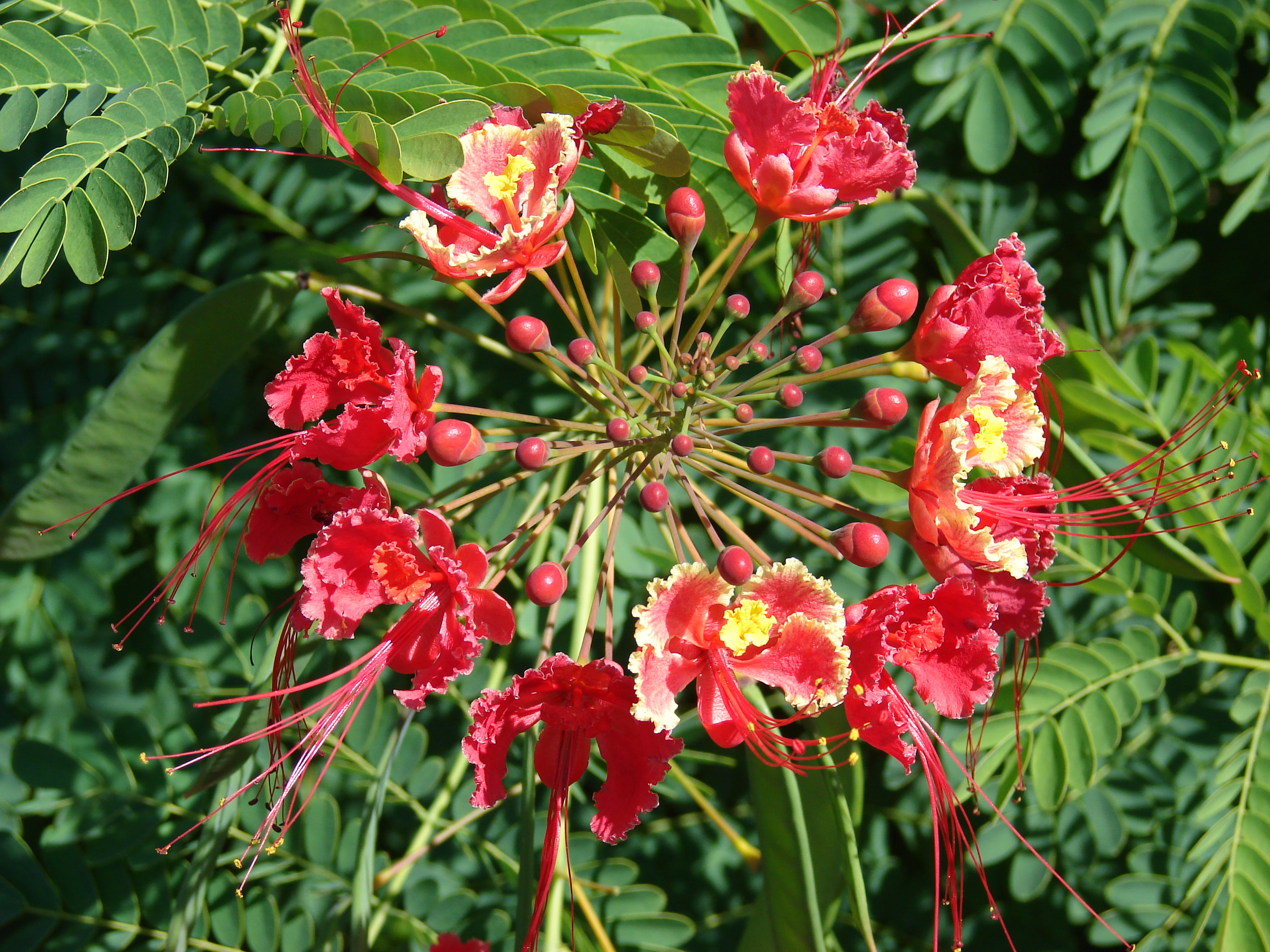
- Caesalpinia pulcherrima

Scientific classification
- Kingdom: Plantae
- Clade: Tracheophytes
- Clade: Angiosperms
- Clade: Eudicots
- Clade: Rosids
- Order: Fabales
- Family: Fabaceae
- Subfamily: Caesalpinioideae
- Tribe: Caesalpinieae
- Genus: Caesalpinia; Plum. ex L. (1853)

Type species
- Caesalpinia brasiliensis L.

Species
- 10; see text

Synonyms
- Campecia Adans. (1763), nom. superfl.; Poincia Neck. (1790), opus utique oppr.; Poinciana Tourn. ex L. (1753); Radackia Cham. & Endl. (1836)

= Caesalpinia =

Genus of legumes

Caesalpinia is a genus of flowering plants in the family Fabaceae. It includes 10 species which range from southeastern Mexico through Central America to Colombia, Ecuador, and Peru, and to Cuba, Hispaniola, and the Bahamas.

== Taxonomy ==
Historically, membership within the genus has been highly variable, with different publications including anywhere from 70 to 165 species, depending largely on the inclusion or exclusion of species alternately listed under genera such as Hoffmannseggia. It contains tropical or subtropical woody plants. The generic name honours the botanist, physician, and philosopher Andrea Cesalpino (1519–1603).

The genus also had a synonym of Poinciana; it was named after a common name for the one species which was placed in now named Delonix regia, after Phillippe de Longvilliers de Poincy, who was the French governor of the Caribbean island of Saint Kitts. The name Caesalpiniaceae at family level, or Caesalpinioideae at the level of subfamily, is based on this generic name.

== Species ==
10 species are currently accepted:

- Caesalpinia anacantha Urb.
- Caesalpinia bahamensis Lam.
- Caesalpinia barahonensis Urb.
- Caesalpinia brasiliensis L.
- Caesalpinia cassioides Willd.
- Caesalpinia domingensis Urb.
- Caesalpinia monensis Britton — black nicker
- Caesalpinia nipensis Urb.
- Caesalpinia pulcherrima (L.) Sw. — Pride of Barbados, yellow peacock
- Caesalpinia secundiflora Urb.

== Uses ==
Some species are grown for their ornamental flowers.
