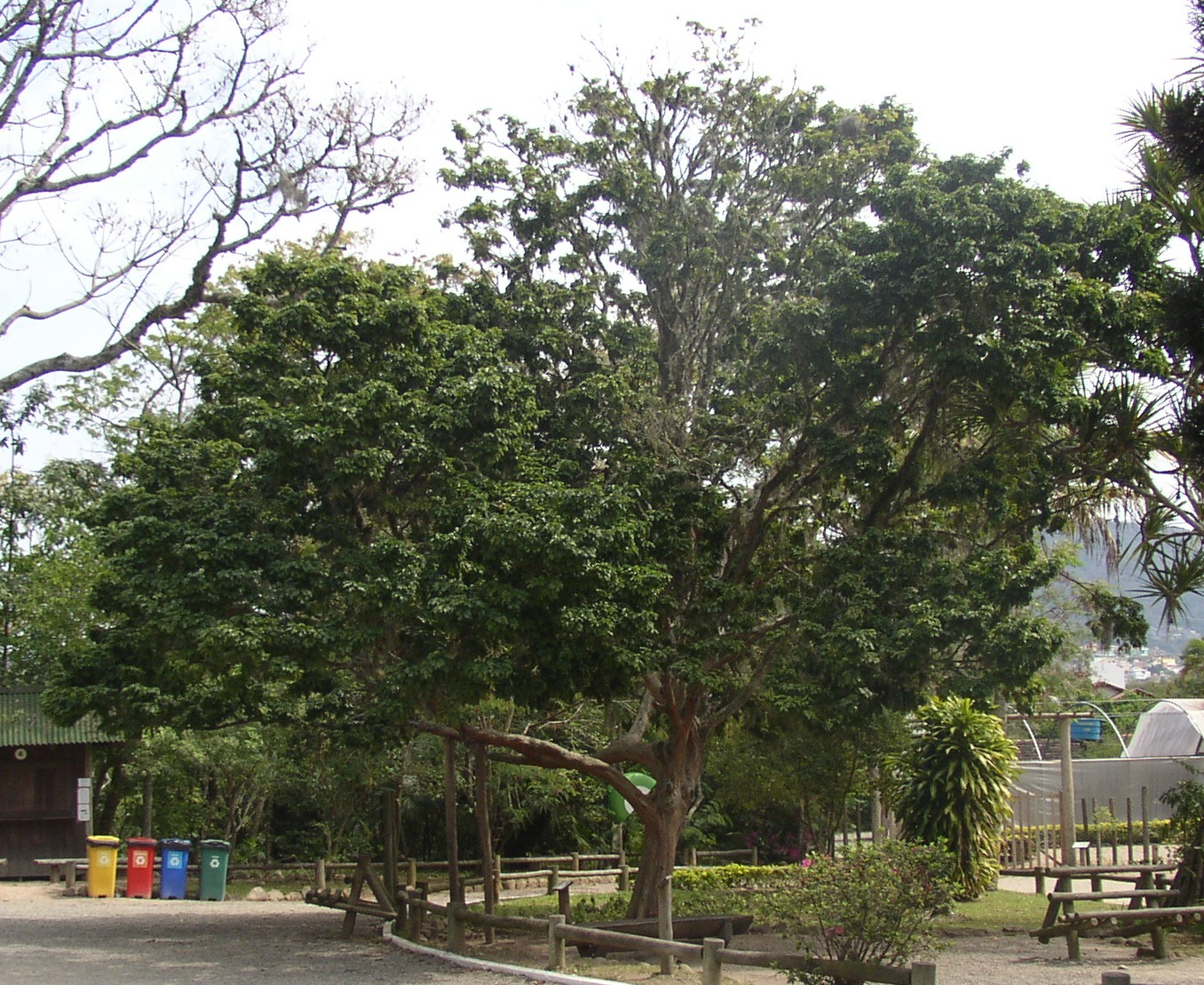
- An adult specimen in a park in Florianópolis, Brazil.

Conservation status
- Endangered (IUCN 2.3)

Scientific classification
- Kingdom: Plantae
- Clade: Tracheophytes
- Clade: Angiosperms
- Clade: Eudicots
- Clade: Rosids
- Order: Fabales
- Family: Fabaceae
- Genus: Paubrasilia (Gagnon, H.C.Lima & G.P.Lewis 2016)
- Species: P. echinata

Binomial name
- Paubrasilia echinata ((Lam.) Gagnon, H.C.Lima & G.P.Lewis 2016)

Synonyms
- Caesalpinia echinata Lam. 1785; Guilandina echinata Spreng. 1825

= Paubrasilia =

Paubrasilia echinata

Species of plant in the legume family

Paubrasilia echinata is a species of flowering plant in the legume family, Fabaceae, that is endemic to the Atlantic Forest of Brazil. It is a Brazilian timber tree commonly known as brazilwood (pau-brasil; Tupi: ybyrapytanga) and is the national tree of Brazil. This plant has a dense, orange-red heartwood that takes a high shine, and it is the premier wood used for making bows for stringed instruments. The wood also yields a historically important red dye called brazilin, which oxidizes to brazilein.

The name pau-brasil was applied to certain species of the genus Caesalpinia in the medieval period, and was given its original scientific name Caesalpinia echinata in 1785 by Jean-Baptiste Lamarck. More recent taxonomic studies have suggested that it merits recognition as a separate genus, and it was thus renamed Paubrasilia echinata in 2016. The Latin specific epithet of echinata refers to hedgehog, from echinus, and describes the thorns which cover all parts of the tree (including the fruits).

The name of Brazil is a shortened form of Terra do Brasil, 'land of brazilwood'.

== Name ==
When Portuguese explorers found Paubrasilia on the coast of South America, they recognised it as a relative of an Asian species of sappanwood already used in Europe for producing red dye. The Portuguese named these trees pau-brasil, the term pau meaning wood, and brasil meaning reddish/ember-like. The South American trees soon dominated trading as a better source of dye. Such a vigorous trade resulted from the woods that early sailors and merchants started referring to the land itself as Terra do Brasil, or simply, the "Land of Brazil"; from this use, the present name of Brazil was derived.

Botanically, several tree species are involved, all in the family Fabaceae (the pulse family). The term "brazilwood" is most often used to refer to the species Paubrasilia echinata, but it is also applied to other species, such as Biancaea sappan and Haematoxylum brasiletto. The tree is also known by other names: such as ibirapitanga, from Tupi ïbi'rá pi'tãga meaning "reddish wood"; or pau de pernambuco, named after the Brazilian state of Pernambuco.

In describing bows for string instruments, it is usual to refer to some species other than Paubrasilia echinata as "brazilwood"; examples include pink ipê (Handroanthus impetiginosus), massaranduba (Manilkara bidentata) and palo brasil (Haematoxylum brasiletto). The highly prized Paubrasilia echinata is usually called "Pernambuco wood" in this particular context.

== Description ==
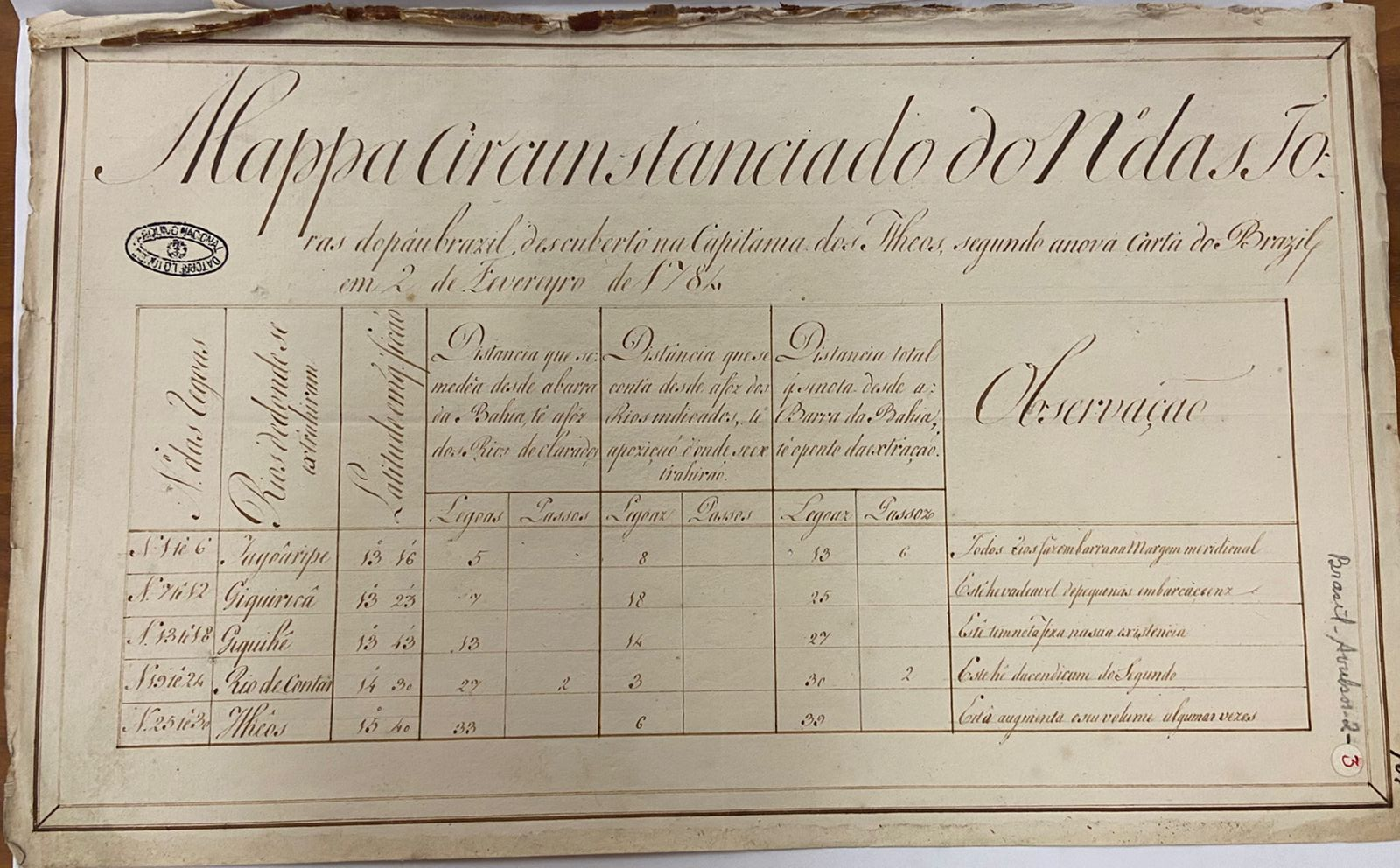
Map of the Number of Logs of Brazilwood Discovered in the Captaincy of Ilhéus.

The brazilwood tree may reach up to 15 metres (49 ft) in height, and the dark brown bark flakes in large patches, revealing the lustrous blood-red sapwood underneath. The leaves are pinnate and each consists of between 9 and 19 small, leathery leaflets, which are broadly oblong in shape. The flower stalk, or inflorescence, is also branched and contains between 15 and 40 yellow, strongly perfumed flowers, which may be pollinated by bees. The petals are usually yellow with a blood-red blotch. The fruits are oval-shaped woody seedpods, measuring as much as 7.3 centimetres (2.9 in) long and 2.6 centimetres (1.0 in) across; they hang off the branches and after the seeds are expelled, the pods become twisted. The branches, leaves and fruit are covered with small thorns.

There are some important differences between geographically distinct populations and it is thought that separate subspecies of the pau brasil may exist. This tree may have some medicinal properties and has been used as an astringent and antidiuretic by local people; extracts have been tested as possible cancer treatments.

== Historical importance ==
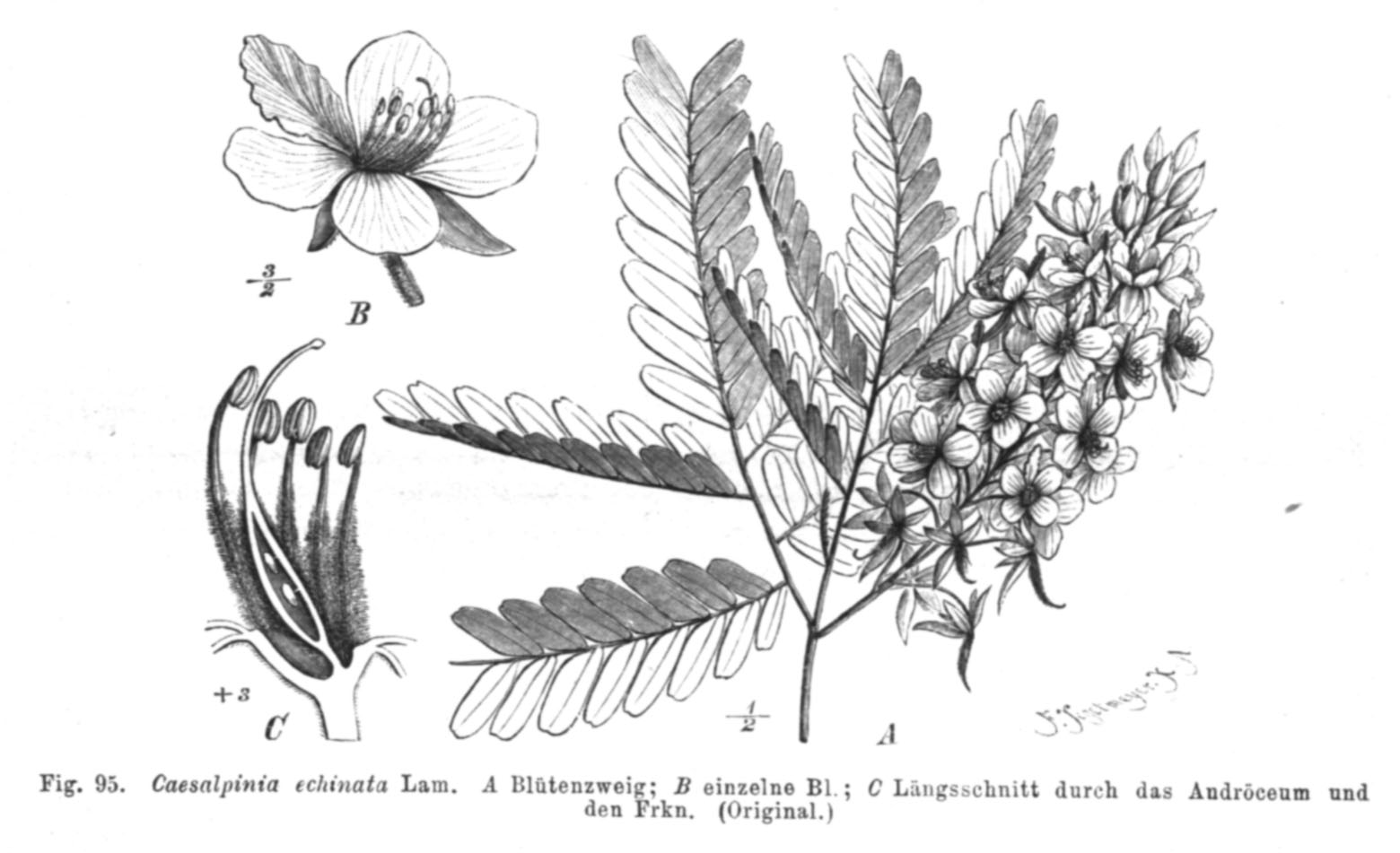
An illustration of the tree leaves and flowers.

Starting in the 16th century, brazilwood became highly valued in Europe and quite difficult to get. A related wood, sappanwood, coming from Asia was traded in powder form and used as a red dye in the manufacture of luxury textiles, such as velvet, in high demand during the Renaissance. When Portuguese navigators landed in present-day Brazil, on April 22, 1500, they immediately saw that brazilwood was extremely abundant along the coast and in its hinterland, along the rivers. In a few years, a hectic and very profitable operation for felling and shipping all the brazilwood logs they could get was established, as a crown-granted Portuguese monopoly. The rich commerce which soon followed stimulated other nations to try to harvest and smuggle brazilwood contraband out of Brazil, and corsairs to attack loaded Portuguese ships in order to steal their cargo. For example, the unsuccessful attempt in 1555 of a French expedition led by Nicolas Durand de Villegaignon, vice-admiral of Brittany and corsair under the King, to establish a colony in present-day Rio de Janeiro (France Antarctique) was motivated in part by the bounty generated by economic exploitation of brazilwood. In addition, this plant is also cited in Flora Brasiliensis by Carl Friedrich Philipp von Martius.

== Use in the music industry and excessive harvesting ==
Brazilwood is considered to be superior to all other materials for making stringed-instrument bows. Excessive harvesting led to a steep decrease in the number of brazilwood trees in the 18th century, causing the collapse of this economic activity. Presently, the species is nearly extirpated in most of its original range. Brazilwood is listed as an endangered species by the IUCN, and it is cited in the official list of endangered flora of Brazil.

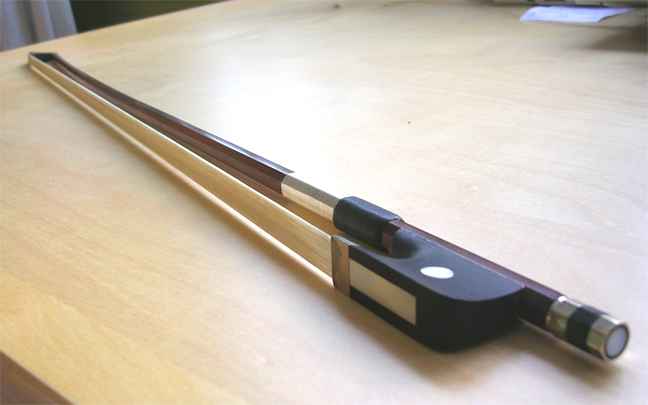
A cello bow

At the 2024 annual meeting of the Convention on International Trade in Endangered Species of Wild Fauna and Flora (CITES) it was resolved that existing stockpiles of the wood should be registered, that finished bows should be marked and traceable, and that suitable plantations in Brazil should be identified to maintain a sustainable supply. Future trade and conservation of the product was discussed at the November 2025 CITES conference, when suppliers and users were directed to improve traceability of the wood and musical instruments made from it. The International Pernambuco Conservation Initiative (IPCI), whose members are the bowmakers who rely on pernambuco for their livelihoods, is working to replant the trees. IPCI advocates the use of other woods for violin bows to raise money to plant pernambuco seedlings. The shortage of pernambuco has also helped the carbon fiber and composite bow industry to thrive.

== Replanting efforts ==
Restoration of the species in the wild is hampered by the fact that it is a climax community species, which will develop well only when planted amongst secondary forest vegetation. Although many saplings have been distributed or sold during recent decades, that has led to the tree being planted in places outside its natural range, with somewhat poor results. However, brazilwood trees used for urban landscaping in the city of São Paulo fruited abundantly in the city in 2009 due to an exceptionally humid season.

== Gallery ==
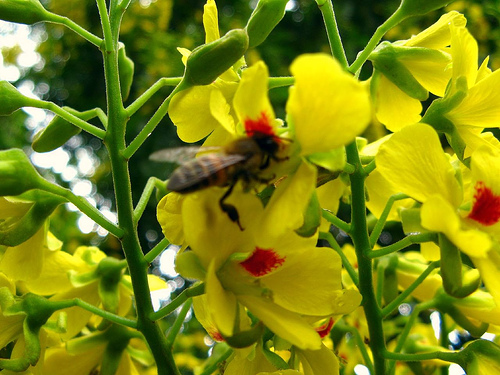
Bee in flower, Botanical Garden, São Paulo

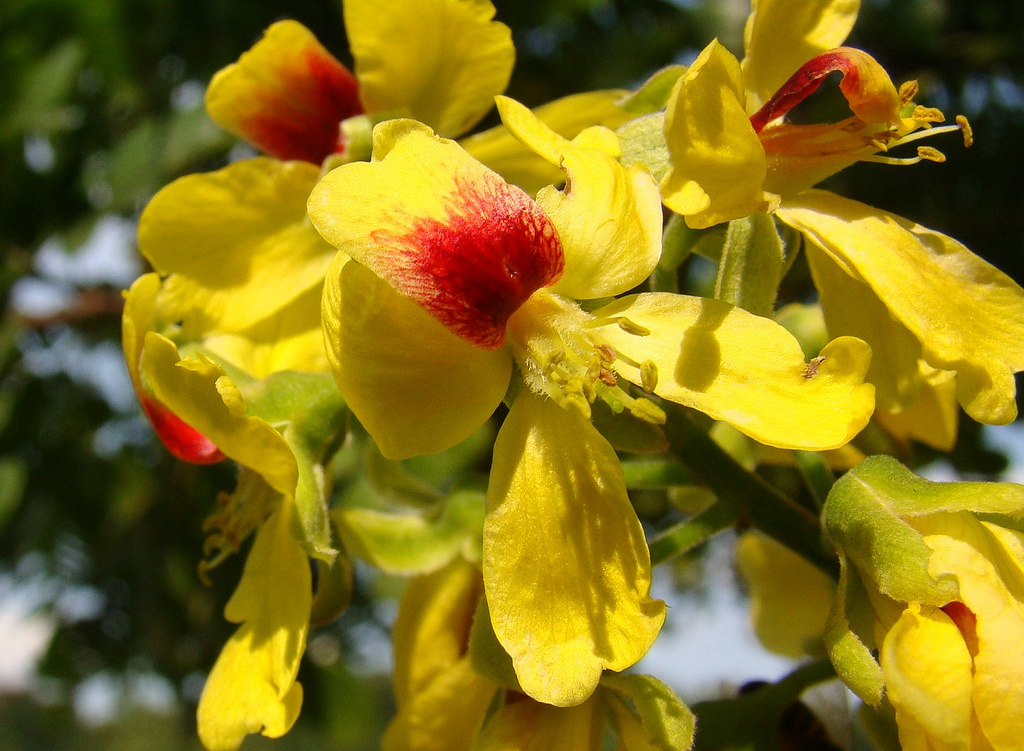
Flowers detail

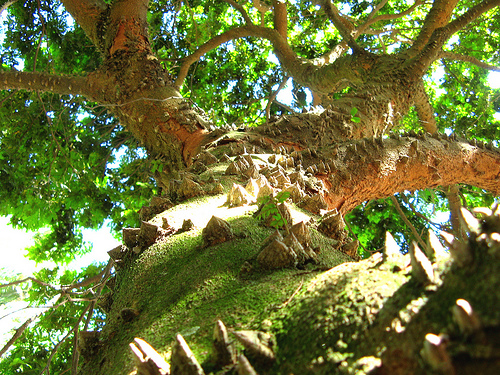
Spiny trunk, Botanical Garden, São Paulo

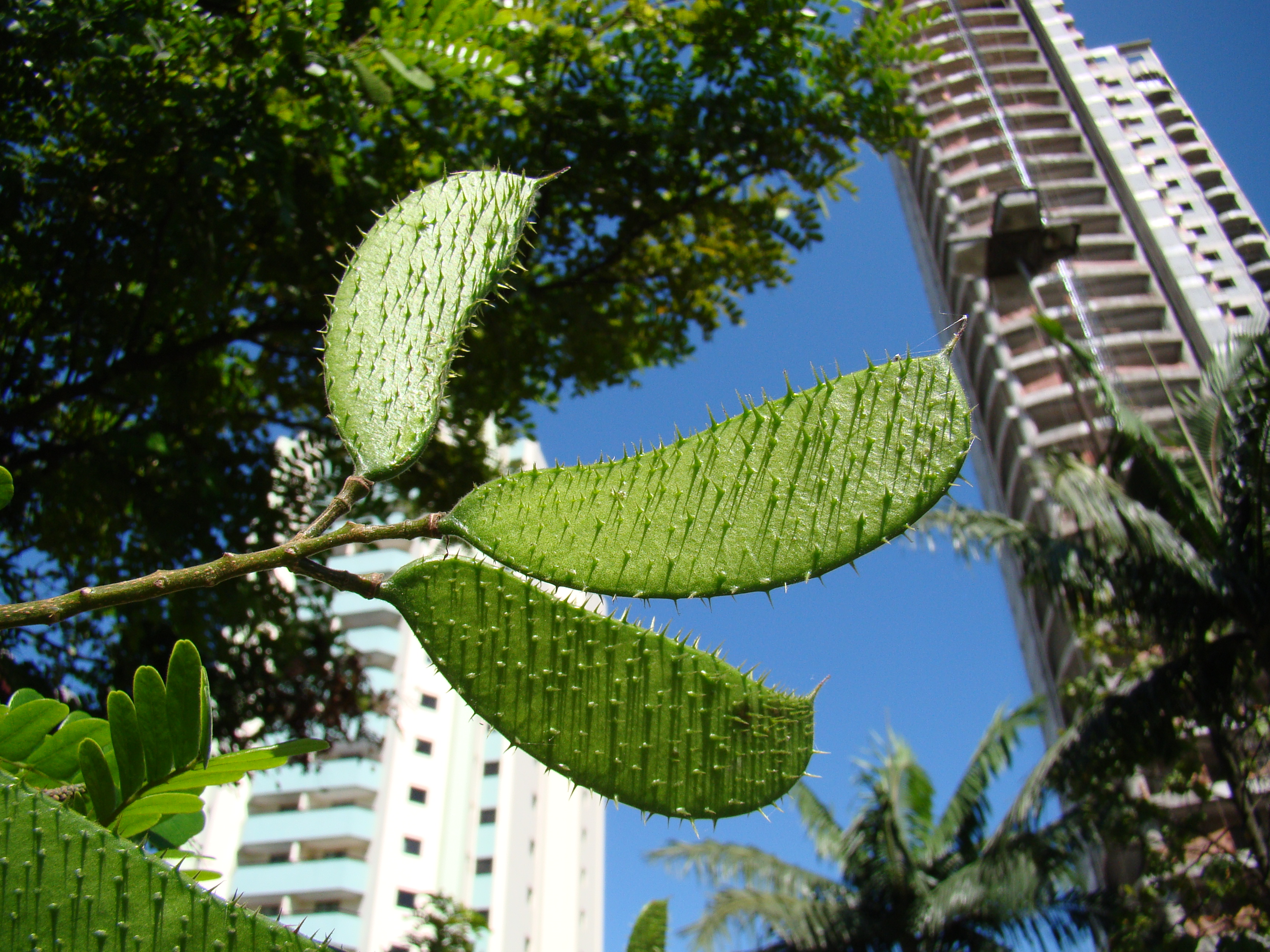
Spiny fruit (legume-like seed pods), CERET Park, São Paulo

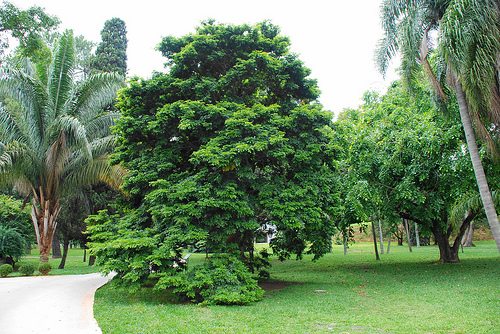
Botanical Garden, São Paulo

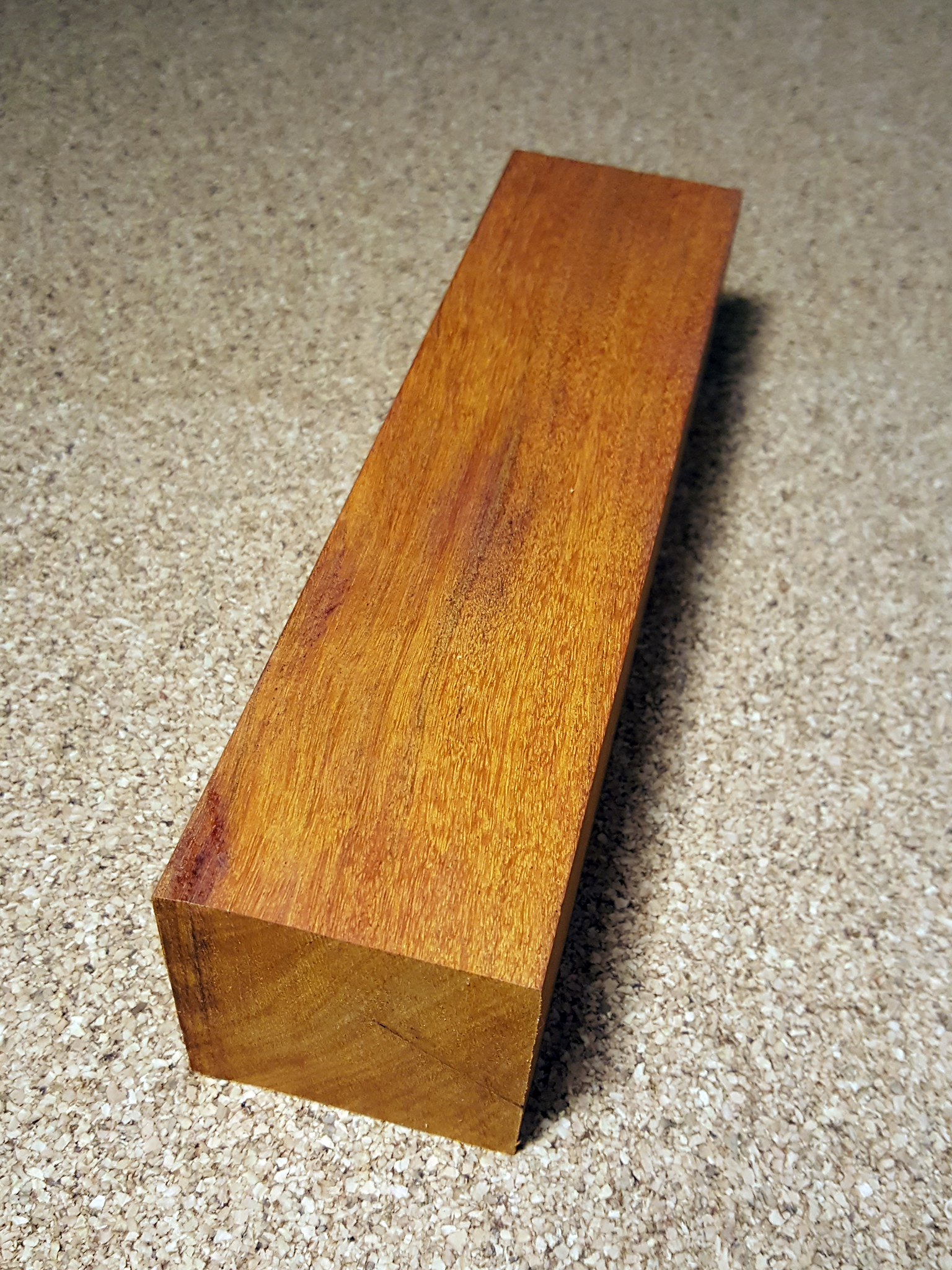
P. echinata heartwood

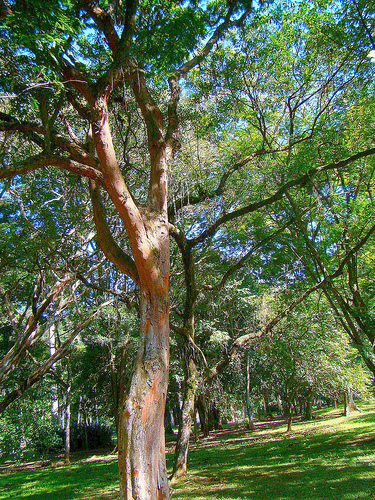
The red of the wood can be observed in this adult specimen at the Rio de Janeiro Botanical Garden

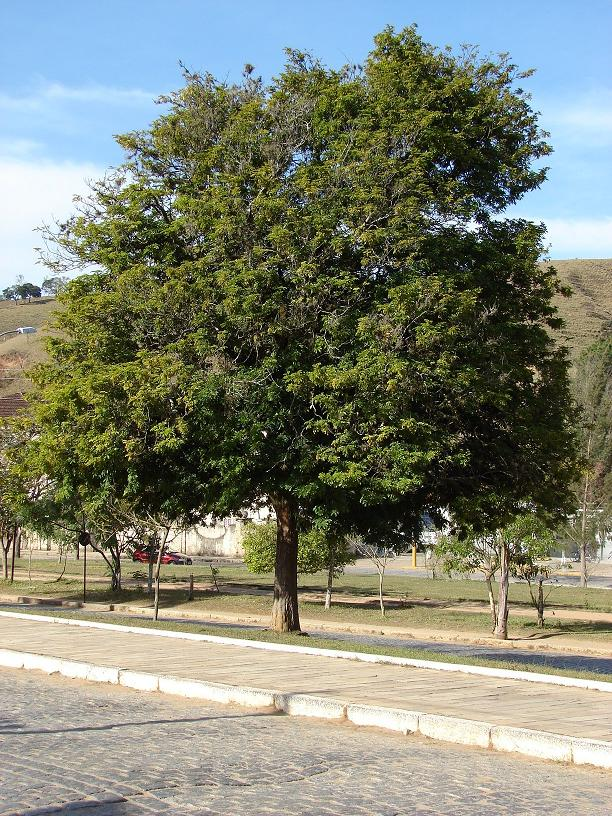
Adult tree

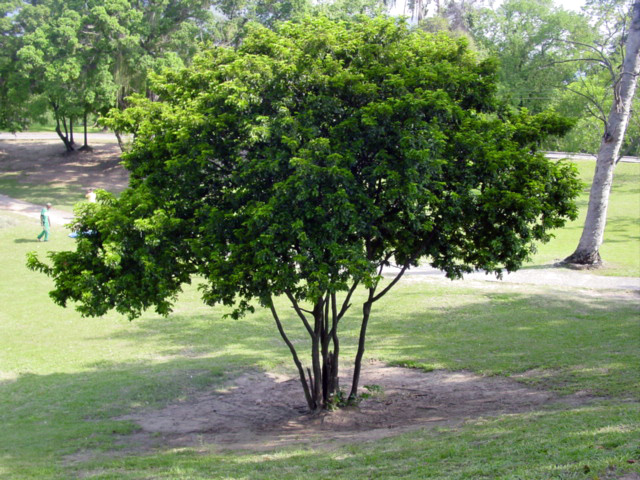
Brazilwood planted at Quinta da Boa Vista, in Rio de Janeiro
