= H&E stain =

Histological staining method

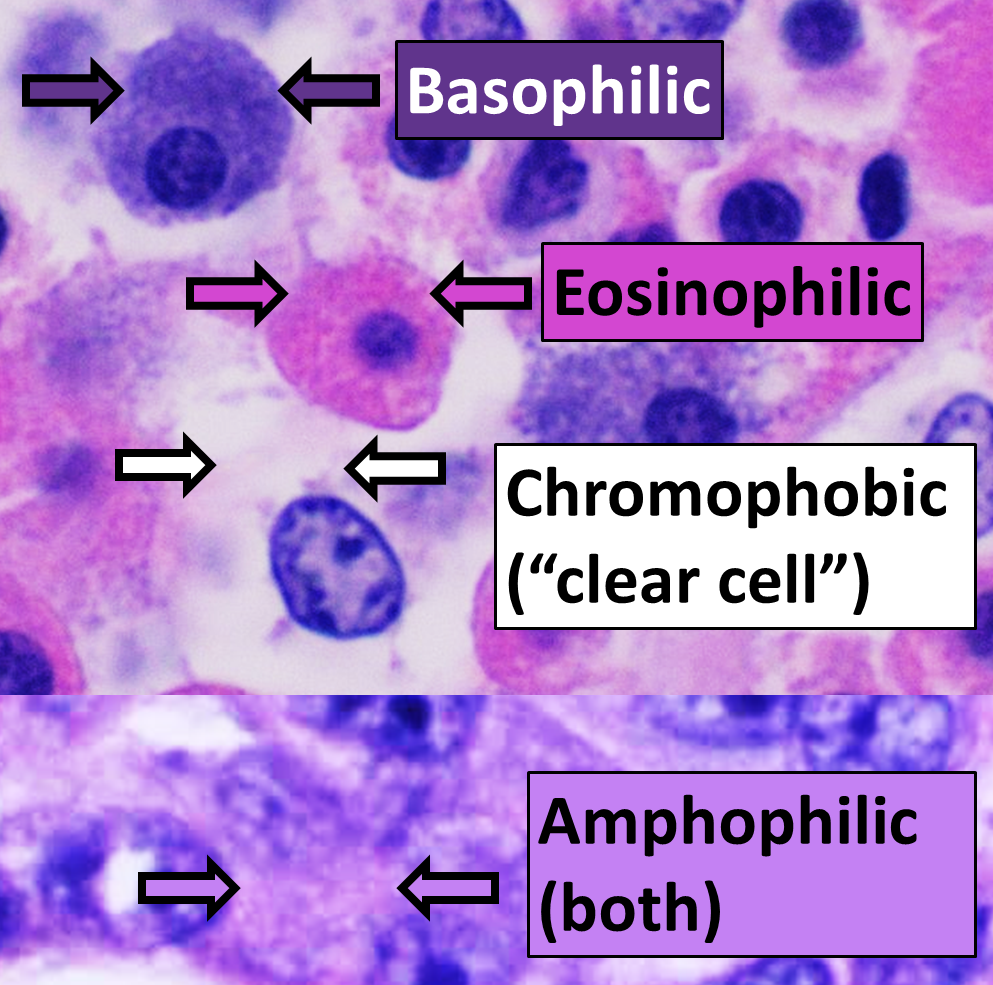
Main types of staining seen on H&E stain. Basophilic essentially means hematoxyphilic (it's a basic dye). Chromophobic material does not stain with either.

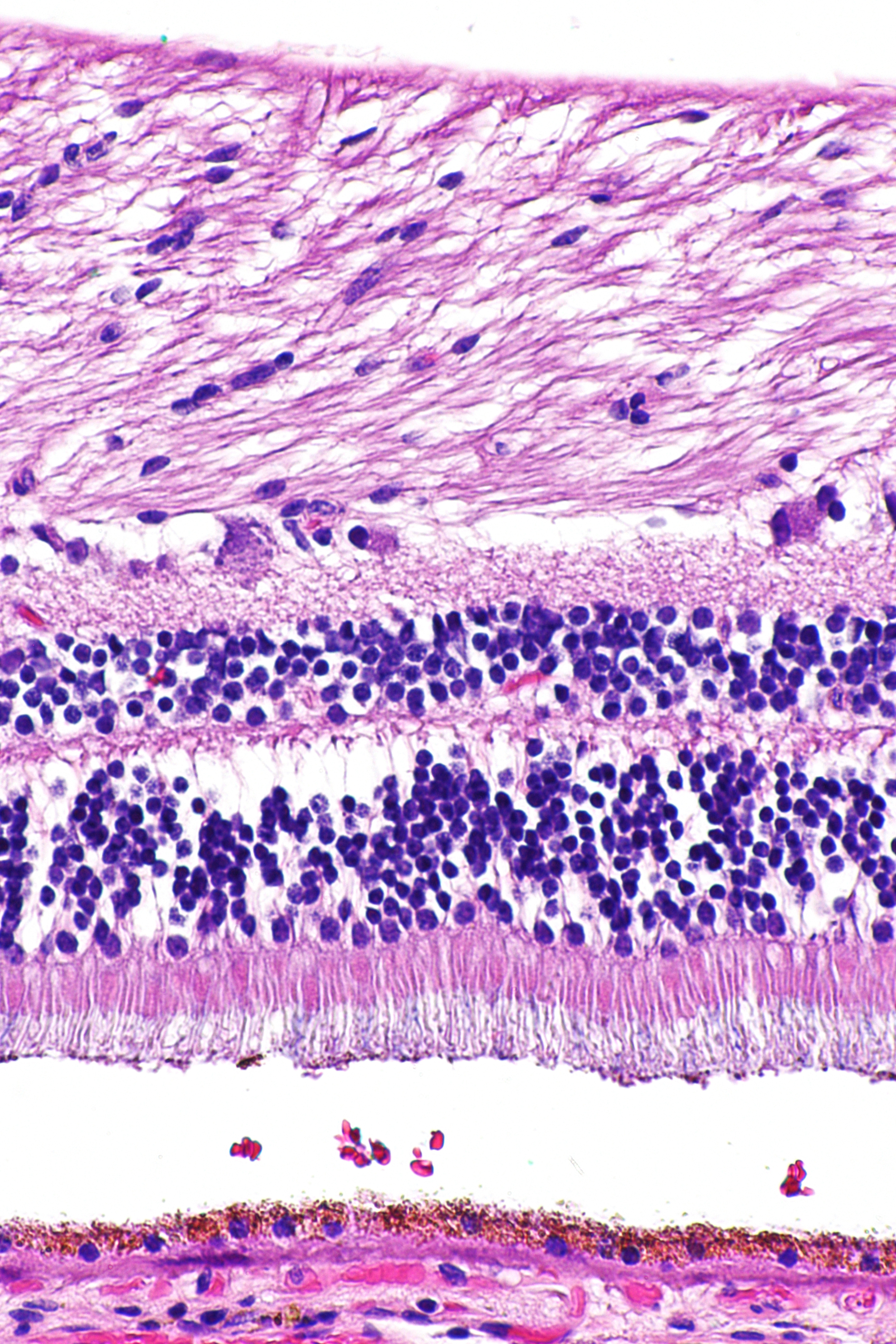
Retina (part of the eye) stained with hematoxylin and eosin, cell nuclei stained blue-purple and extracellular material stained pink

Hematoxylin and eosin stain (or haematoxylin and eosin stain or hematoxylin–eosin stain; often abbreviated as H&E stain or HE stain) is one of the principal tissue stains used in histology. It is the most widely used stain in medical diagnosis and is often the gold standard. For example, when a pathologist looks at a biopsy of a suspected cancer, the histological section is likely to be stained with H&E.

H&E is the combination of two histological stains: hematoxylin and eosin. The hematoxylin stains cell nuclei a purplish blue, and eosin stains the extracellular matrix and cytoplasm pink, with other structures taking on different shades, hues, and combinations of these colors. Hence a pathologist can easily differentiate between the nuclear and cytoplasmic parts of a cell, and additionally, the overall patterns of coloration from the stain show the general layout and distribution of cells and provides a general overview of a tissue sample's structure. Thus, pattern recognition, both by expert humans themselves and by software that aids those experts (in digital pathology), provides histologic information.

This stain combination was introduced in 1877 by chemist Nicolaus Wissozky at the Kazan Imperial University in Russia.

== Uses ==
The H&E staining procedure is the principal stain in histology in part because it can be done quickly, is not expensive, and stains tissues in such a way that a considerable amount of microscopic anatomy is revealed, and can be used to diagnose a wide range of histopathologic conditions. The results from H&E staining are not overly dependent on the chemical used to fix the tissue or slight inconsistencies in laboratory protocol, and these factors contribute to its routine use in histology.

H&E staining does not always provide enough contrast to differentiate all tissues, cellular structures, or the distribution of chemical substances, and in these cases more specific stains and methods are used.

== Method of application ==
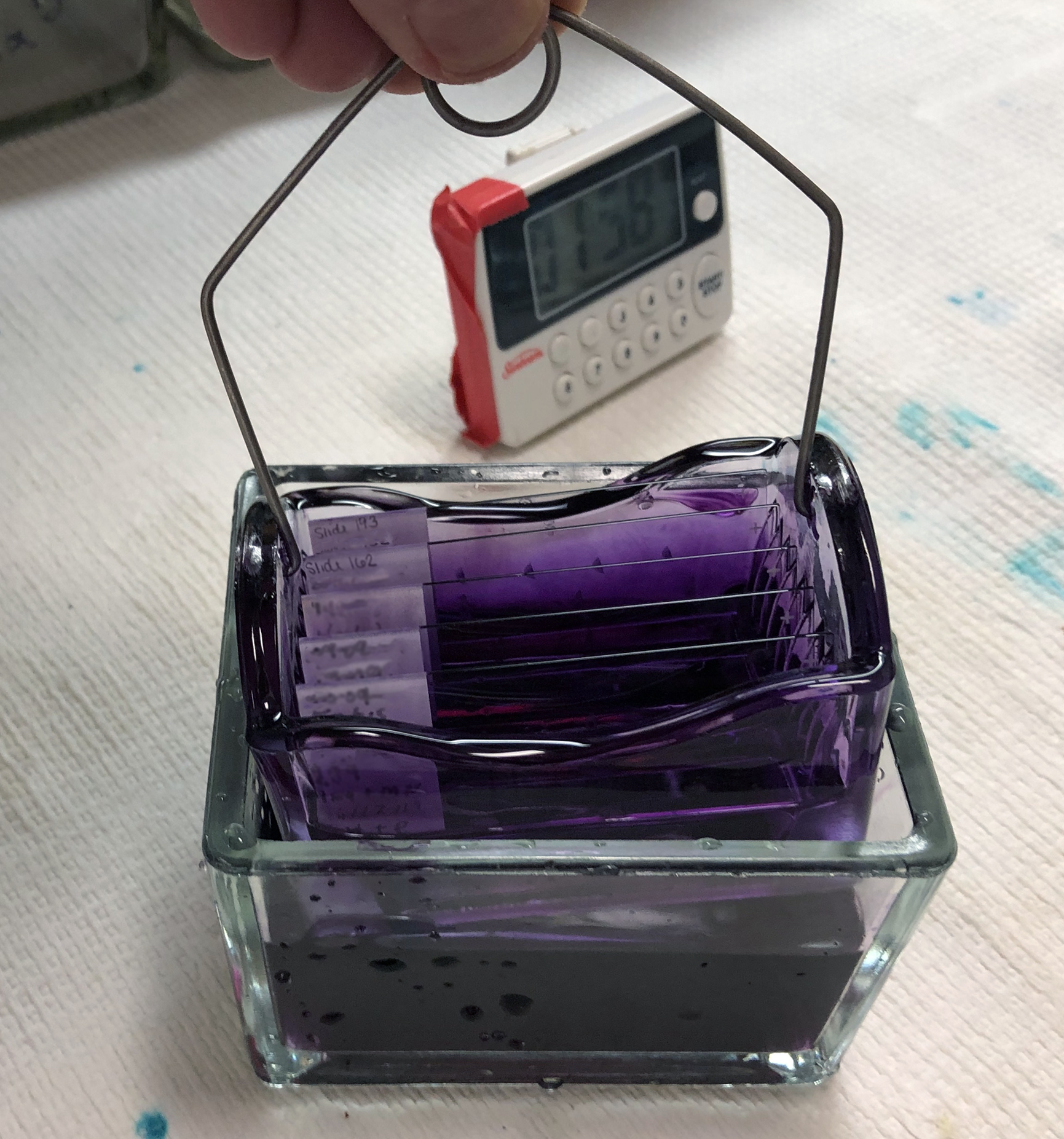
Rack of slides being removed from a bath of hematoxylin stain

There are many ways to prepare the hematoxylin solutions (formulation) used in the H&E procedure, in addition, there are many laboratory protocols for producing H&E stained slides, some of which may be specific to a certain laboratory. Although there is no standard procedure, the results by convention are reasonably consistent in that cell nuclei are stained blue and the cytoplasm and extracellular matrix are stained pink. Histology laboratories may also adjust the amount or type of staining for a particular pathologist.

After tissues have been collected (often as biopsies) and fixed, they are typically dehydrated and embedded in melted paraffin wax, the resulting block is mounted on a microtome and cut into thin slices. The slices are affixed to microscope slides at which point the wax is removed with a solvent and the tissue slices attached to the slides are rehydrated and are ready for staining. Alternatively, H&E stain is the most used stain in Mohs surgery in which tissues are typically frozen, cut on a cryostat (a microtome that cuts frozen tissue), fixed in alcohol, and then stained.

The H&E staining method involves application of haematoxylin mixed with a metallic salt, or mordant, often followed by a rinse in a weak acid solution to remove excess staining (differentiation), followed by bluing in mildly alkaline water. After the application of haematoxylin, the tissue is counterstained with eosin (most commonly eosin Y).

== Results ==
Hematoxylin principally colors the nuclei of cells blue or dark-purple, along with a few other tissues, such as keratohyalin granules and calcified material. Eosin stains the cytoplasm and some other structures including extracellular matrix such as collagen in up to five shades of pink. The eosinophilic (substances that are stained by eosin) structures are generally composed of intracellular or extracellular proteins. The Lewy bodies and Mallory bodies are examples of eosinophilic structures. Most of the cytoplasm is eosinophilic and is rendered pink. Red blood cells are stained intensely red.

== Mode of action ==
Although hematein, an oxidized form of hematoxylin, is the active colorant (when combined with a mordant), the stain is still referred to as hematoxylin. Hematoxylin, when combined with a mordant (most commonly aluminum alum) is often considered to "resemble" a basic, positively charged, or cationic stain. Eosin is an anionic (negatively charged) and acidic stain. The staining of nuclei by hemalum (a combination of aluminum ions and hematein) is ordinarily due to binding of the dye-metal complex to DNA, but nuclear staining can be obtained after extraction of DNA from tissue sections. The mechanism is different from that of nuclear staining by basic (cationic) dyes such as thionine or toluidine blue. Staining by basic dyes occurs only from solutions that are less acidic than hemalum, and it is prevented by prior chemical or enzymatic extraction of nucleic acids. There is evidence to indicate that co-ordinate bonds, similar to those that hold aluminium and hematein together, bind the hemalum complex to DNA and to carboxy groups of proteins in the nuclear chromatin.

The structures do not have to be acidic or basic to be called basophilic and eosinophilic; the terminology is based on the affinity of cellular components for the dyes. Other colors, e.g. yellow and brown, can be present in the sample; they are caused by intrinsic pigments such as melanin. Basal laminae need to be stained by PAS stain or some silver stains, if they have to be well visible. Reticular fibers also require silver stain. Hydrophobic structures also tend to remain clear; these are usually rich in fats, e.g. adipocytes, myelin around neuron axons, and Golgi apparatus membranes.

== Examples of H&E stained tissues ==
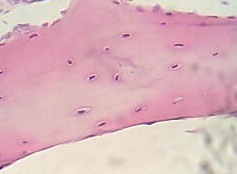
Bone, cell nuclei (blue-purple), bone matrix (pink)

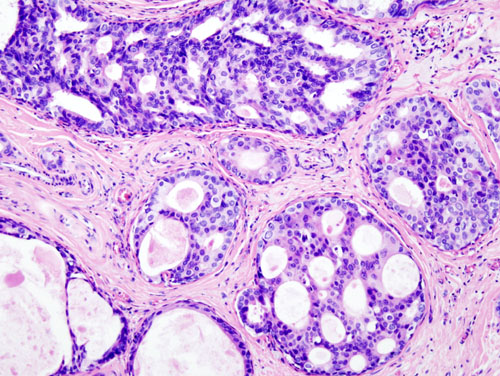
Ductal carcinoma in situ (DCIS) in breast tissue, cell nuclei (blue-purple), extracellular material (pink)

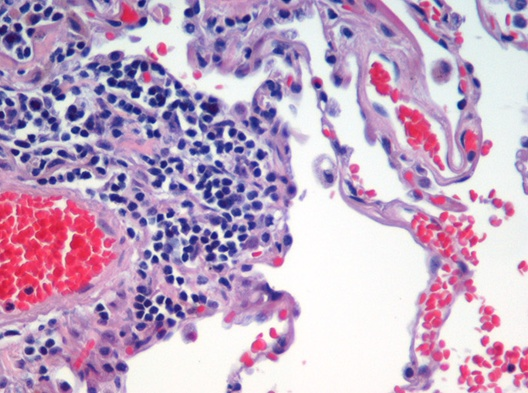
Lung tissue taken from an emphysema patient. Cell nuclei (blue-purple), red blood cells (bright red), other cell bodies and extracellular material (pink), and air spaces (white).

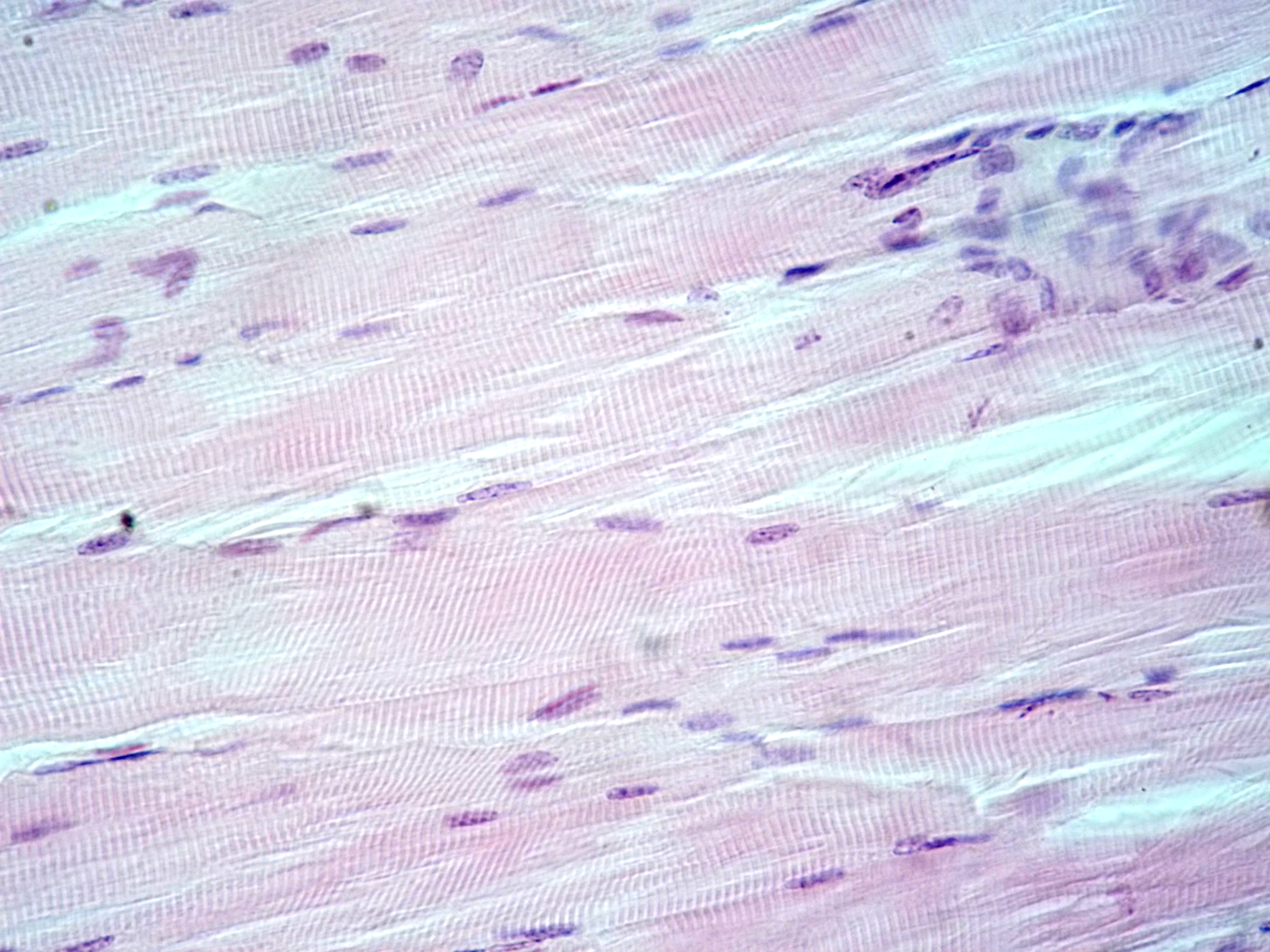
Muscle tissue, cell nuclei (blue-purple), cell body (pink)

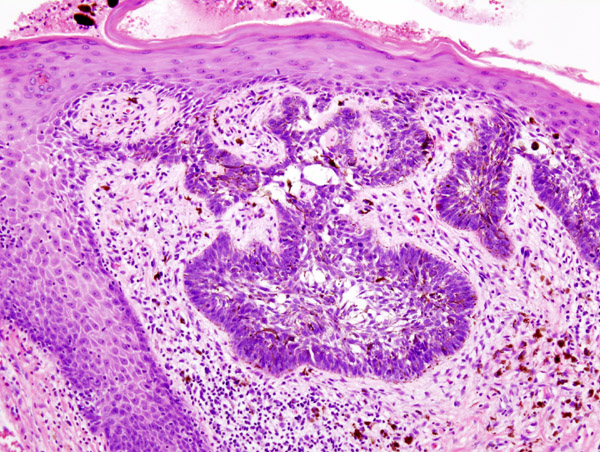
Basal cell carcinoma of the skin, cell nuclei (blue-purple), extracellular material (pink)
