= Haematoxylin =

Natural stain derived from hearthwood and used in histology

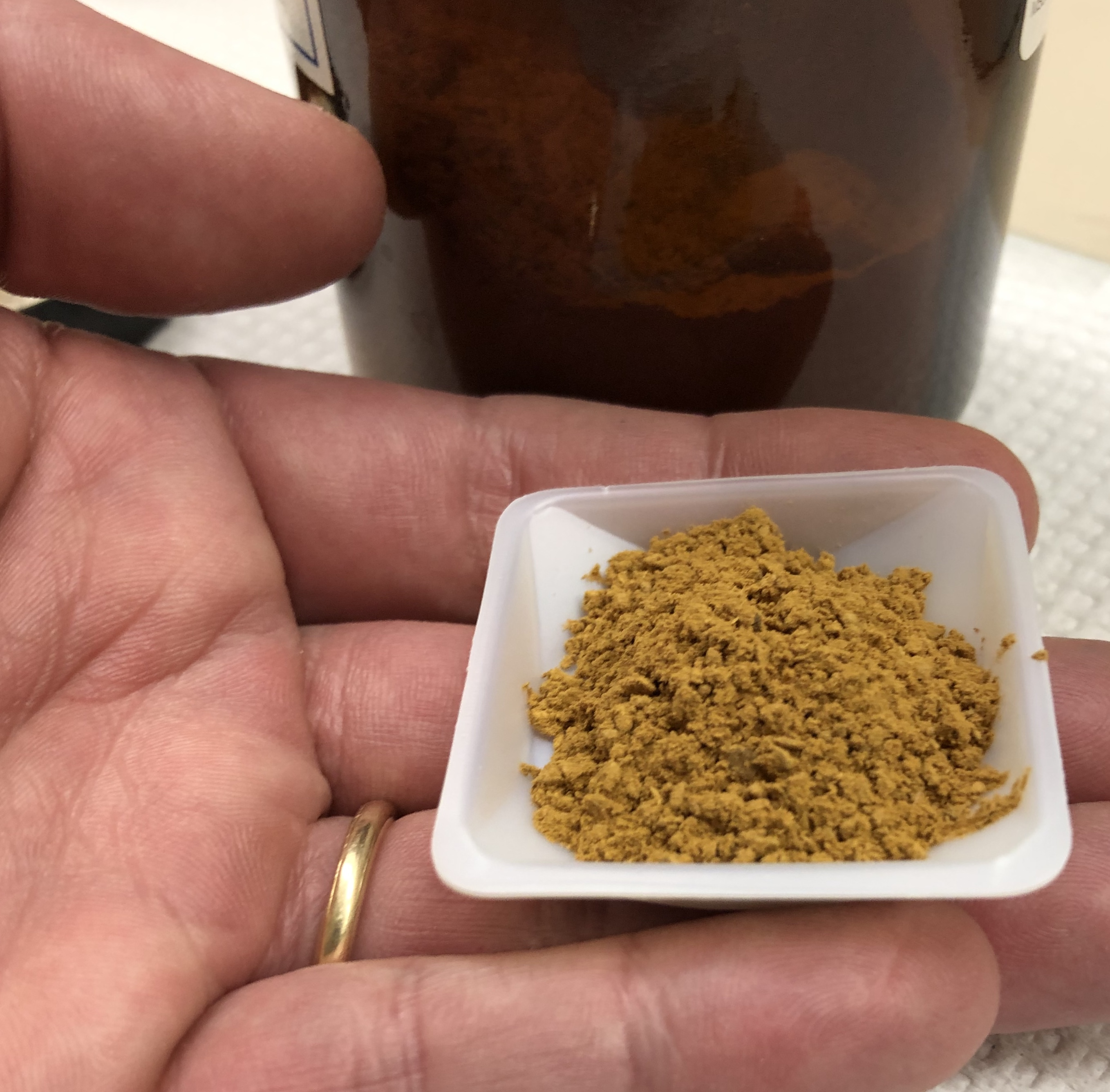

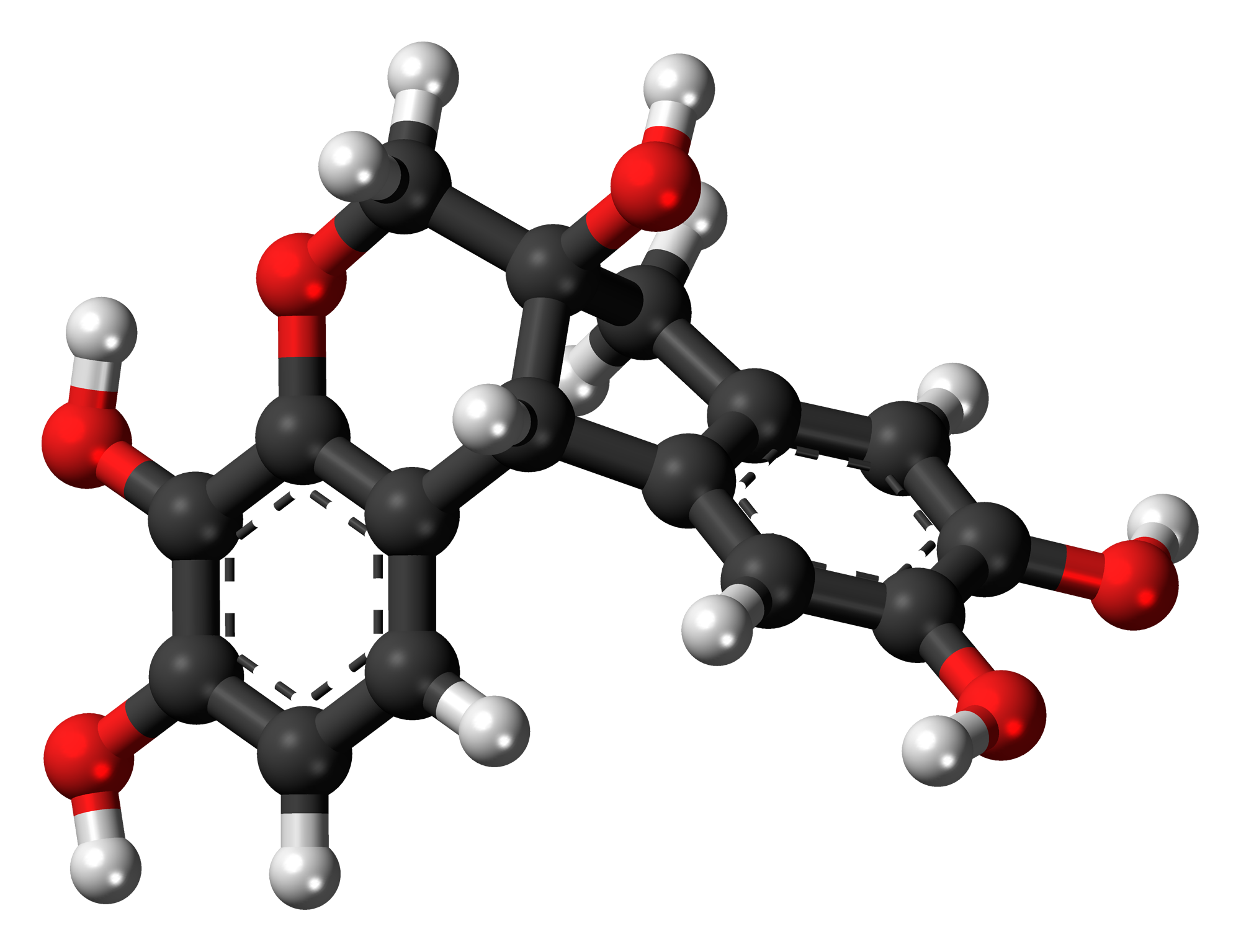

Names
- Preferred IUPAC name (6aS,11bR)-7,11b-Dihydroindolo[2,1-c][1]benzopyran-3,4,6a,9,10(6H)-pentol
- Other names Hematoxylin; Natural Black 1; Hematoxyline; Hydroxybrazilin; Hydroxybrasilin; C.I. 75290

Identifiers
CAS Number	517-28-2
3D model (JSmol)	Interactive image
ChEMBL	ChEMBL477197
ChemSpider	21106443
ECHA InfoCard	100.007.490
MeSH	Hematoxylin
PubChem CID	10603
UNII	YKM8PY2Z55
CompTox Dashboard (EPA)	DTXSID8020678
- InChI: InChI=1S/C16H14O6/c17-10-2-1-8-13-9-4-12(19)11(18)3-7(9)5-16(13,21)6-22-15(8)14(10)20/h1-4,13,17-21H,5-6H2/t13?,16-/m0/s1 Key: WZUVPPKBWHMQCE-VYIIXAMBSA-N; InChI=1/C16H14O6/c17-10-2-1-8-13-9-4-12(19)11(18)3-7(9)5-16(13,21)6-22-15(8)14(10)20/h1-4,13,17-21H,5-6H2/t13?,16-/m0/s1 Key: WZUVPPKBWHMQCE-VYIIXAMBBJ
- SMILES: Oc2cc3C[C@]4(O)COc1c(O)c(O)ccc1C4c3cc2O

Properties
Chemical formula	C_{16}H_{14}O_{6}
Molar mass	302.282 g·mol^{−1}
Melting point	100-120 °C
- Except where otherwise noted, data are given for materials in their standard state (at 25 °C [77 °F], 100 kPa). verify (what is ?) Infobox references

Haematoxylin or hematoxylin (/ˌhiːməˈtɒksɪlɪn/), also called natural black 1 or C.I. 75290, is a compound extracted from heartwood of the logwood tree (Haematoxylum campechianum) with a chemical formula of C_{16}H_{14}O_{6}. This naturally derived dye has been used as a histologic stain, as an ink and as a dye in the textile and leather industry. As a dye, haematoxylin has been called palo de Campeche, logwood extract, bluewood and blackwood. In histology, haematoxylin staining is commonly followed by counterstaining with eosin. When paired, this staining procedure is known as H&E staining and is one of the most commonly used combinations in histology. In addition to its use in the H&E stain, haematoxylin is also a component of the Papanicolaou stain (or Pap stain) which is widely used in the study of cytology specimens.

Although the stain is commonly called haematoxylin, the active colourant is the oxidized form haematein, which forms strongly coloured complexes with certain metal ions (commonly Fe(III) and Al(III) salts). In its pure form, haematoxylin is a colourless and crystalline solid, although commercial samples are typically light to dark brown based on the level of impurities present.

== Extraction and purification ==
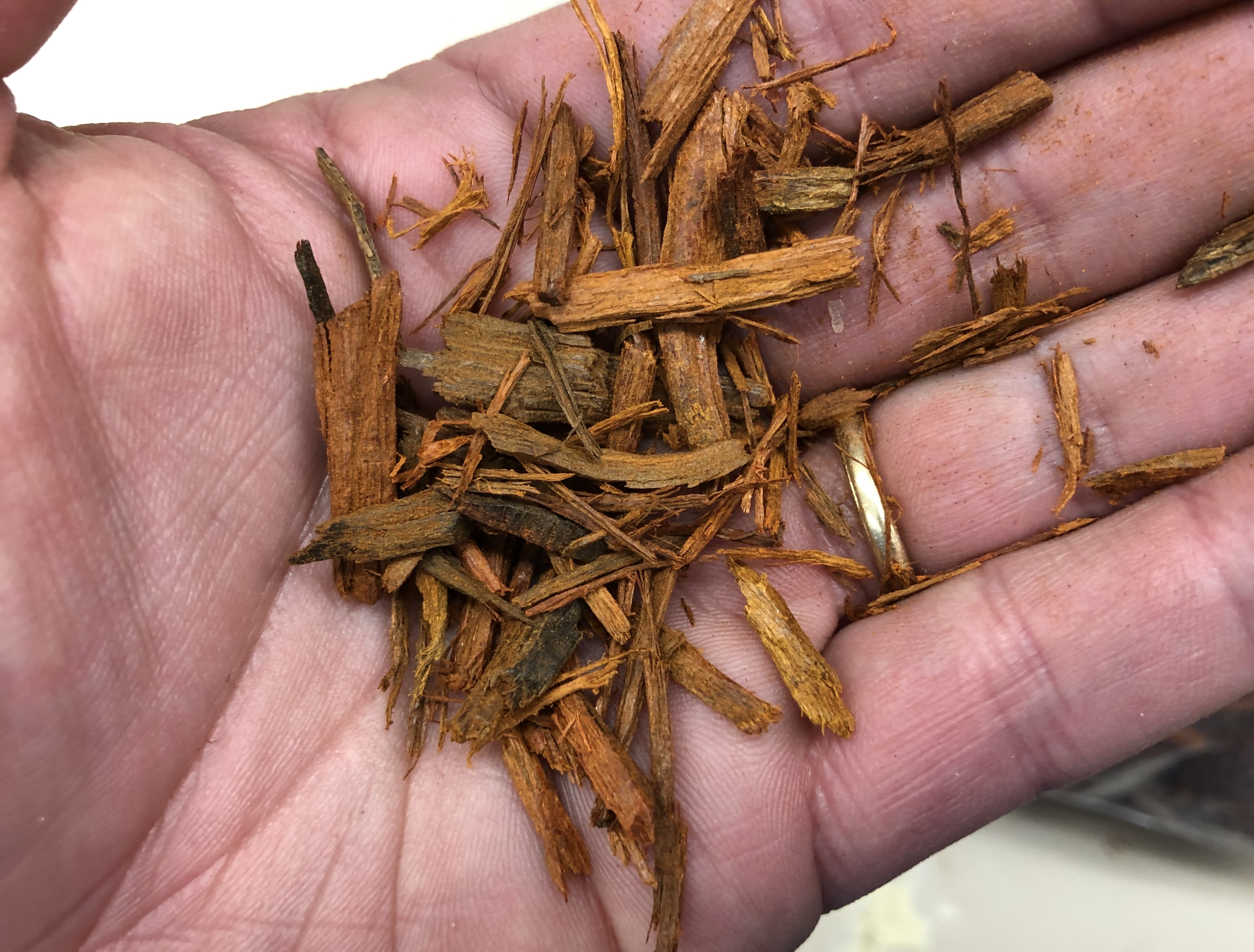
Logwood (Haematoxylum campechianum) chips

Haematoxylin has been synthesized, although never in commercially viable amounts. Historically the logwood was exported and the haematoxylin extracted in Europe. More recently extraction takes place closer to where the logwood is harvested. Extraction of haematoxylin from logwood on industrial scales has been accomplished in the 'French process' by boiling the wood chips or in the 'American process' with steam and pressure. Once extracted, the dye can be sold as a liquid concentrate or dried and sold in a crystalline form. Modern production methods use water, ether or alcohol as a solvent, at which point the extracts may be further refined to the level of purity needed.

The commercial product may vary from batch to batch and between manufacturers in both the level of impurities and in the ratio of haematoxylin to haematein. For histologic use, this variability can affect the stain's interaction with biological tissue samples, and is therefore of concern to histologists and pathologists. Haematoxylin, like other biological stains, may be certified by the Biological Stain Commission, signifying that a particular batch of stain works in a standardized test, although this does not specify the dye's actual purity.

== Use as a histologic stain ==
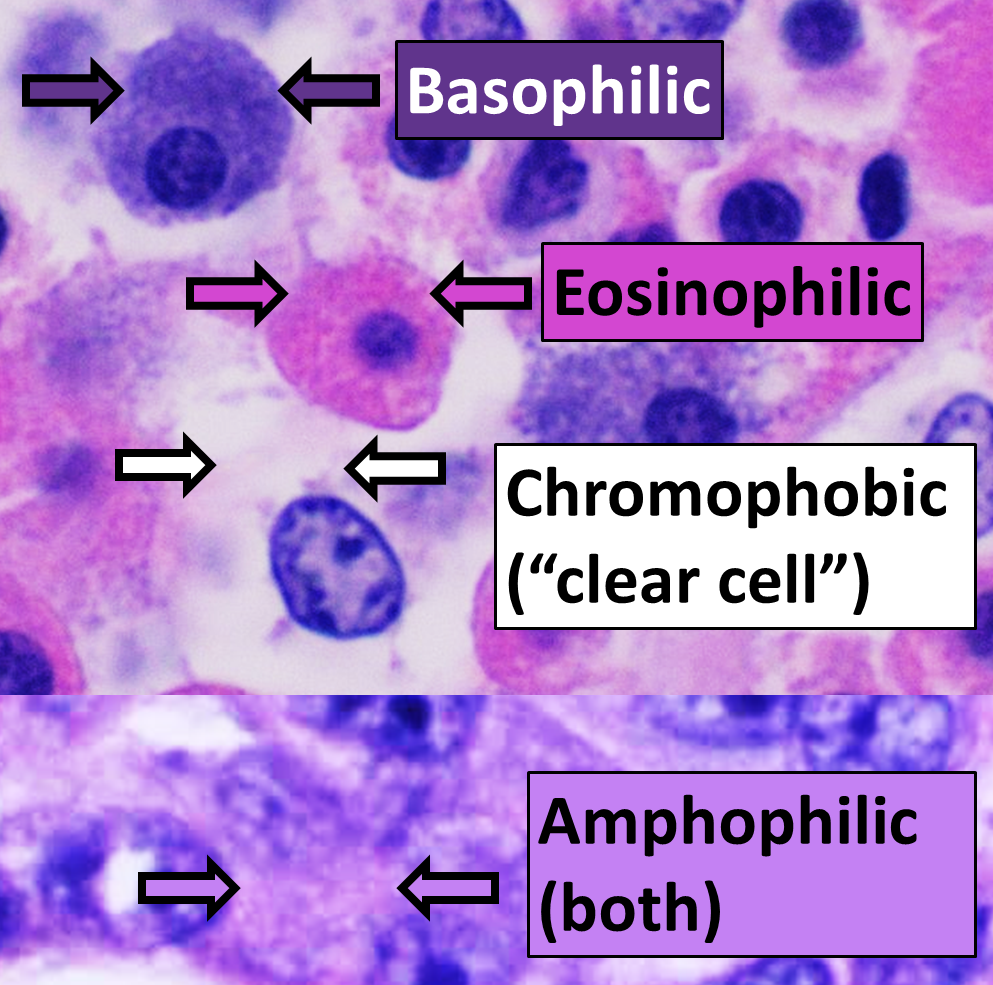
Hematoxylin staining shown as "basophilic" at top, seen with dual staining with hematoxylin and eosin (H&E).

Haematoxylin stain is commonly followed (or counterstained) with another histologic stain, eosin. When paired, this staining procedure is known as H&E staining, and is one of the most commonly used combinations in histology. Haematoxylin is also a component of the Papanicolaou stain (or PAP stain) which is widely used in the study of cytology specimens, notably in the PAP test used to detect cervical cancer.

Principally used as a nuclear stain (to stain the cell nucleus), haematoxylin will also stain rough endoplasmic reticulum, ribosomes, collagen, myelin, elastic fibers, and acid mucins. Haematoxylin alone is not an effective stain, but when oxidized to hematein, and combined with a mordant, stains chromatin in cell nuclei dark blue to black. The colour and specificity of haematoxylin stains are controlled by the chemical nature, and amount, of the mordant used, and the pH of the staining solution, thus, a variety of haematoxylin formulations have been developed.

=== Stain formulations ===
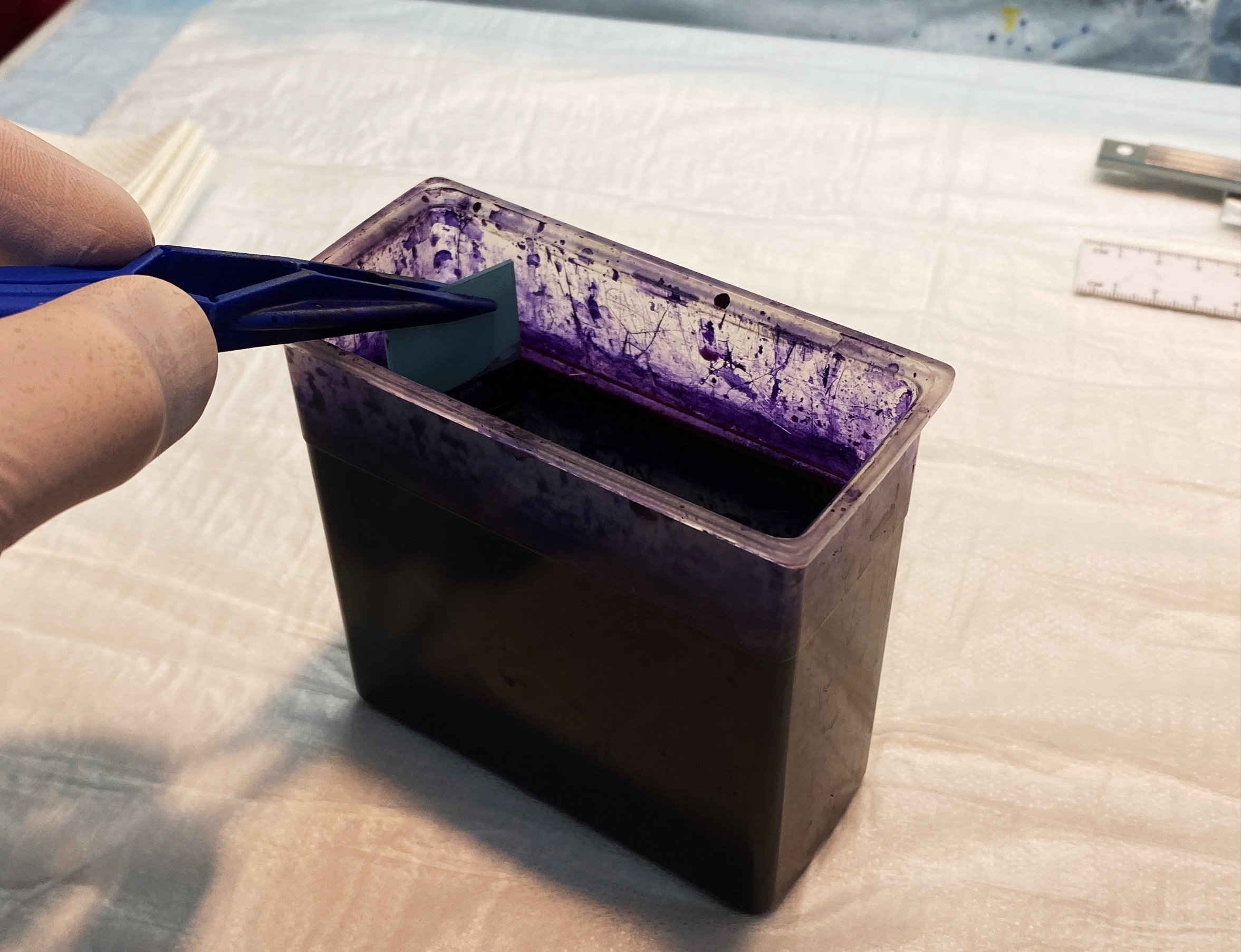
Hematoxylin solution for staining microscopy slides.

Haematoxylin stain formulations can be broadly classified based on how the haematoxylin is oxidized (or ripened) and by choice of the mordant used. Haematoxylin stain formulations may either be natural oxidized by exposure to air and sunlight, or more commonly, especially in commercially prepared solutions, chemically oxidized using sodium iodate. Commonly only enough oxidizer is added to convert one half of the haematoxylin to haematein, allowing the remainder to naturally oxidize during use, this extends the staining solution's useful life as more haematein is produced, while some haematein is further oxidized to oxyhaematein. Of the metallic salts used as mordants, aluminium is the most common, other mordants include salts of iron, tungsten, molybdenum and lead.

Depending on the formulation or staining technique, haematoxylin stains may be used in what is called a progressive manner, in which the length of time the tissue remains in contact with the staining solution is used to control the amount of colouration, or in a regressive manner, in which the tissue is over-stained, and excess stain is removed in a secondary step of the procedure. Removal of unwanted staining, or differentiation, typically involves a solution of diluted ethanol and hydrochloric acid.

==== Table of significant formulations ====
Formula name	Reference	Mordant	Oxidation method	Typical use
Ehrlich's Haematoxylin	Ehrlich, 1886	Potassium alum	Natural	Nuclear stain in H&E
Delafield's Haematoxylin	Prudden, 1855	Ammonium alum	Natural	Nuclear stain in H&E
Mayer's Haematoxylin	Mayer, 1903	Potassium or Ammonium alum	Sodium iodate	Nuclear stain in H&E
Harris's Haematoxylin	Harris, 1900	Potassium alum	Mercuric oxide	Nuclear stain in H&E, also used in the classical versions of the Papanicolaou stain
Cole's Haematoxylin	Cole, 1943	Potassium alum	Iodine	Nuclear stain in H&E
Carazzi's Haematoxylin	Carazzi, 1911	Potassium alum	Potassium iodate	Nuclear stain in H&E, urgent biopsy sections
Weigert's Haematoxylin	Weigert, 1904	Ferric chloride	Natural	Nuclear stain in H&E, resistant to acids
Verhoeff's Haematoxylin	Verhoeff, 1908	Ferric chloride	Iodine	elastic fibers, myelin
Mallory's phosphotungstic acid Haematoxylin	Mallory, 1897	Phosphotungstic acid	Natural or chemical	Fibrin, muscle striations
Gill's Haematoxylin (I, II, and III)	Culling et al. 1985	Aluminium sulfate	Sodium iodate	Nuclear stain in H&E

=== Early use as a histologic stain ===
In 1758, Georg Christian Reichel used haemotoxylin, without a mordant, to stain plant tissues. John Thomas Quekett in an 1852 book, suggests using "logwood" (haematoxylin) to dye translucent material for examination under the microscope. In 1863, Wilhelm von Waldeyer-Hartz used haematoxylin on animal tissue without a mordant (with limited success), and is sometimes credited as being the first to do so, although this is not universally accepted. Franz Böhmer in 1865 published a haematoxylin formula using alum as a mordant, and in 1891, Paul Mayer published a formulation using a chemical oxidizer to convert haematoxylin into haematein. The first use of haematoxylin with eosin as a counterstain, which is currently the most used stain combination in histology, was first suggested by A. Wissowzky in 1876. By the early 1900s, haematoxylin had become widely accepted as a histologic stain.

=== Shortages and possible alternatives ===
During World War I, the late 1920s, World War II, the early 1970s (summer 1973) and in 2008, there were shortages of haematoxylin due to interruptions in its extraction from logwood. These shortages prompted a search for alternative nuclear stains. Several synthetic dyes have been recommended as replacements, notably celestine blue (CI 51050), gallocyanine (CI 51030), gallein (CI 45445) and eriochrome cyanine R also called chromoxane cyanine R and solochrome cyanine (CI 43820). All four have Fe(III) as the mordant. An alternative is the aluminium complex of oxidized brazilin, which differs from haematoxylin by only one hydroxyl group. A replacement stain for haematoxylin in H&E staining must also not disrupt the ability of histologists and pathologists, who have spent years of training with H&E stained slides, to examine the slides and make medical diagnoses. None of proposed replacement stains have been widely adopted.

== Use as a textile dye ==
Haematoxylin was first used as a dye by the Mayans and Aztecs in Central America where logwood trees grow natively. The dye was first introduced to Europe by the Spanish, and soon after was widely adopted. Haematoxylin was used to produce blacks, blues and purples on various textiles, and remained an important industrial dye until the introduction of suitable replacements in the form of synthetic dyes. As a blue dye (with alum as a mordant), the initial results were not as lightfast as those produced using indigo. In reaction to this perceived inferiority of the quality of the blue colour produced with haematoxylin, its use to dye fabric was barred in England from 1581 to 1662. After the introduction of synthetic black dyes in the late 19th century, haematoxylin was first replaced as a dye for cotton. A 1902 German treatise on the dyeing textiles notes "...logwood in the black dyeing of cotton has suffered considerably from the competition of aniline black". Haematoxylin remained important as a black dye (using copperas or chrome as a mordant) for wool until the 1920s when a black synthetic dye compatible with wool became available. Contemporary usage of haematoxylin includes the dyeing of silk, leather, and sutures.

== Use as a writing and drawing ink ==
Haematoxylin has been used as the primary component of writing and drawing inks, although the timing of first use as an ink is unclear. Haematoxylin was also added to some iron gall inks, which take time to fully darken when applied to paper. In this case the Haematoxylin provided some initial colour before the iron gall reached its full depth of colour. William Lewis in 1763 is credited with being the first to use haematoxylin as an additive in iron gall inks. In 1848, Friedlieb Ferdinand Runge produced a heamatoxylin ink that was non-acidic, using a potassium chromate as the mordant, which had the advantage of not corroding steel pens. Van Gogh is known to have used haematoxylin ink with a chrome mordant in a number of his drawings and letters.

== See also ==
- Staining (biology)
- Histology
- Eosin
- H&E stain
- Haematein
- Verhoeff's stain
- Papanicolaou stain
- Natural dye
- Haematoxylum campechianum
- Haematoxylum brasiletto
