= Nicolaus Wissozky =

Russian scientist

Nicolaus Wissozky was a Russian scientist who first introduced the H&E staining procedure, a method now widely used to stain cells under the microscope.
