= Gallocyanin =

Names
- IUPAC name 7-(Dimethylamino)-4-hydroxy-3-oxo-3H-phenoxazine-1-carboxylic acid

Identifiers
CAS Number	1562-85-2
3D model (JSmol)	Interactive image
ChEBI	CHEBI:90106
ChEMBL	ChEMBL1966521
ChemSpider	21429647
ECHA InfoCard	100.014.860
EC Number	216-345-7
PubChem CID	73801 cation
UNII	8S1S2GY38K
CompTox Dashboard (EPA)	DTXSID60935389
- InChI: InChI=1S/C15H12N2O5/c1-17(2)7-3-4-9-11(5-7)22-14-12(16-9)8(15(20)21)6-10(18)13(14)19/h3-6,19H,1-2H3,(H,20,21) Key: YBGOLOJQJWLUQP-UHFFFAOYSA-N; InChI=1/C15H12N2O5/c1-17(2)7-3-4-9-11(5-7)22-14-12(16-9)8(15(20)21)6-10(18)13(14)19/h3-6,19H,1-2H3,(H,20,21) Key: YBGOLOJQJWLUQP-UHFFFAOYAP
- SMILES: CN(C)c1ccc2c(c1)oc-3c(c(=O)cc(c3n2)C(=O)O)O

Properties
Chemical formula	C_{15}H_{12}N_{2}O_{5}
Molar mass	300.270 g·mol^{−1}

Hazards
- GHS labelling
Pictograms	(GHS07: Exclamation mark)
Signal word	Warning
Hazard statements	H302
Precautionary statements	P264, P270, P301+P312, P330, P501
- Except where otherwise noted, data are given for materials in their standard state (at 25 °C [77 °F], 100 kPa). Infobox references

Gallocyanin is a chemical compound classified as a phenoxazine dye. In combination with certain metals, it is used to prepare gallocyanin stains that are used in identifying nucleic acids.
