= Gallocyanin stain =

Stain for microscopy

The chemical structure of gallocyanin

The gallocyanin stain, also known as the gallocyanin-chromalum stain, is a stain of the oxazine group for total nucleic acids. It is prepared from gallocyanin and is an ideal method for numerous slides that need to be stained serially, equivalently, and reproducible.

Structures containing basophilic compounds take on a bluish color.

== History ==
It has been known since the early work of Einarson (1932) that the gallocyanin dye worked well for nucleotide constituents. Gersch and colleagues at Chicago are often credited with the earliest efforts of using gallocyanin for staining.

Sandritter demonstrated that a stoichiometric relationship occurs between intensity of staining and quantity of nucleic acid present.

== Function ==
Its method of binding and specificity are still not completely known. However, it is thought that gallocyanin-Cr(H_{2}O)_{4} selectively binds to nucleic acid phosphate groups, particularly within a pH range of 1.5-1.75.
