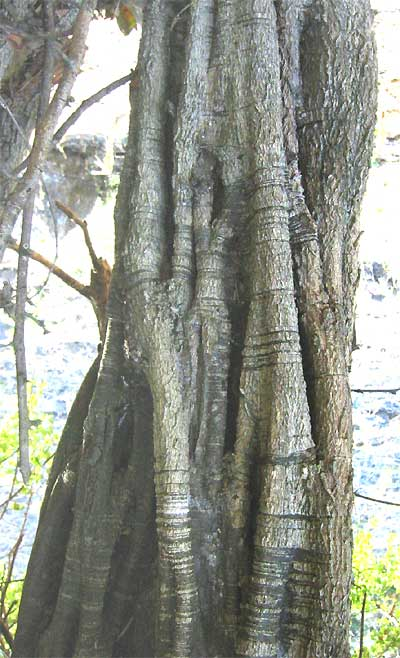
- Fluted trunk

Conservation status
- Least Concern (IUCN 3.1)

Scientific classification
- Kingdom: Plantae
- Clade: Tracheophytes
- Clade: Angiosperms
- Clade: Eudicots
- Clade: Rosids
- Order: Fabales
- Family: Fabaceae
- Subfamily: Caesalpinioideae
- Genus: Haematoxylum
- Species: H. brasiletto

Binomial name
- Haematoxylum brasiletto H.Karst

Synonyms
- Haematoxylum boreale S. Watson

= Haematoxylum brasiletto =

Species of legume

Haematoxylum brasiletto, or Mexican logwood, is a species of tropical hardwood tree in the legume family, Fabaceae. It is known in its native Mexico and Guatemala as "palo de brasil" or "palo de tinto". The timber is used to make bows for stringed instruments, the manufacture of dyes and in ethnobotany.

== Description ==
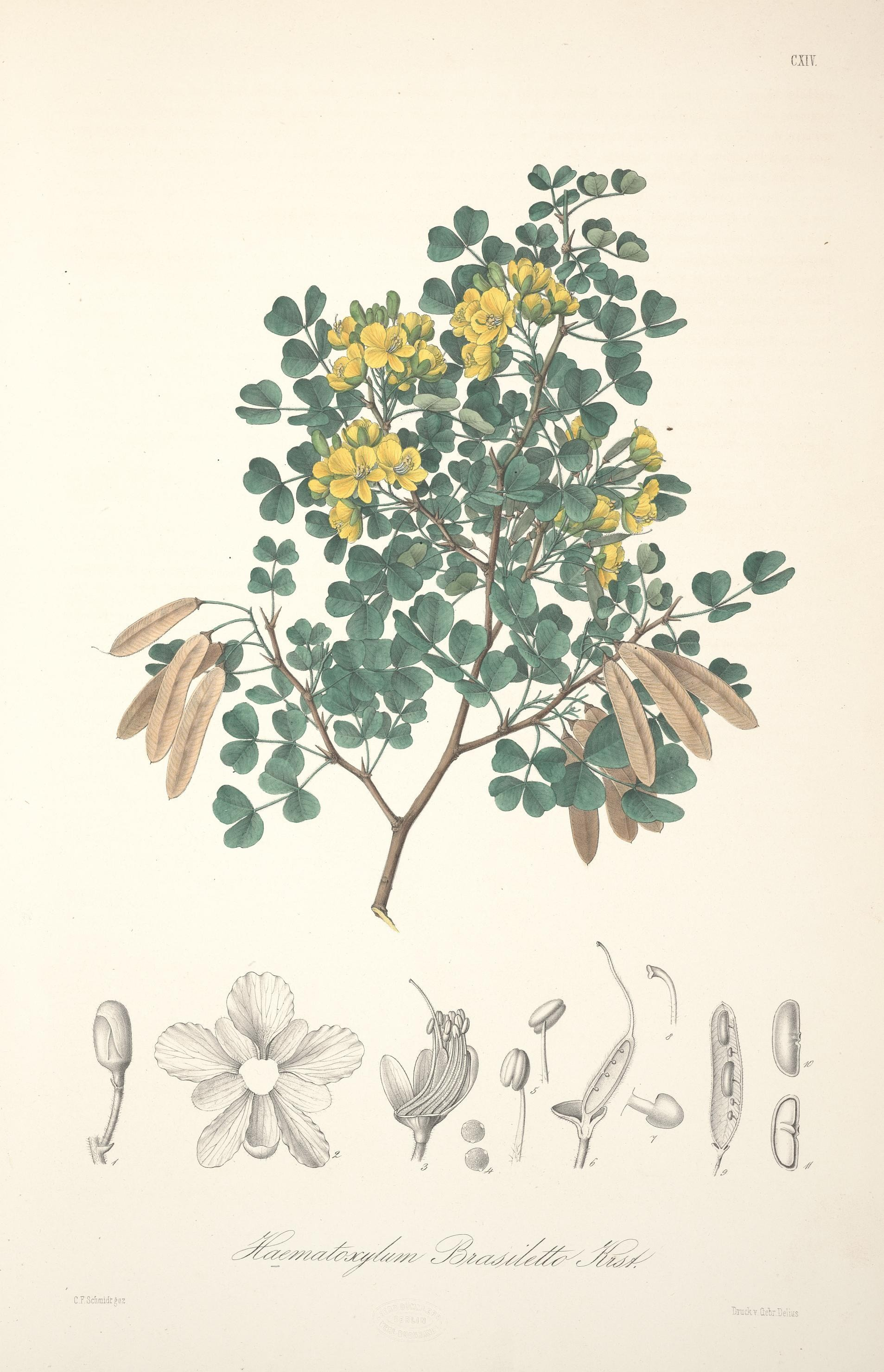
Plate CXIV in Florae Columbiae.

H. brasiletto is a small tree or large thorny shrub, seven to fifteen metres high. The trunk and larger branches are fluted and the heartwood is deep red. The tree has pinnate leaves with three pairs of heart-shaped leaflets and no terminal leaflet. The clusters of yellow flowers are typical of the Caesalpinioideae, with five distinct lobes, and are followed by copper-coloured seed pods that split laterally when ripe, rather than at the edge. The seeds are black and kidney-shaped.

== Distribution and habitat ==
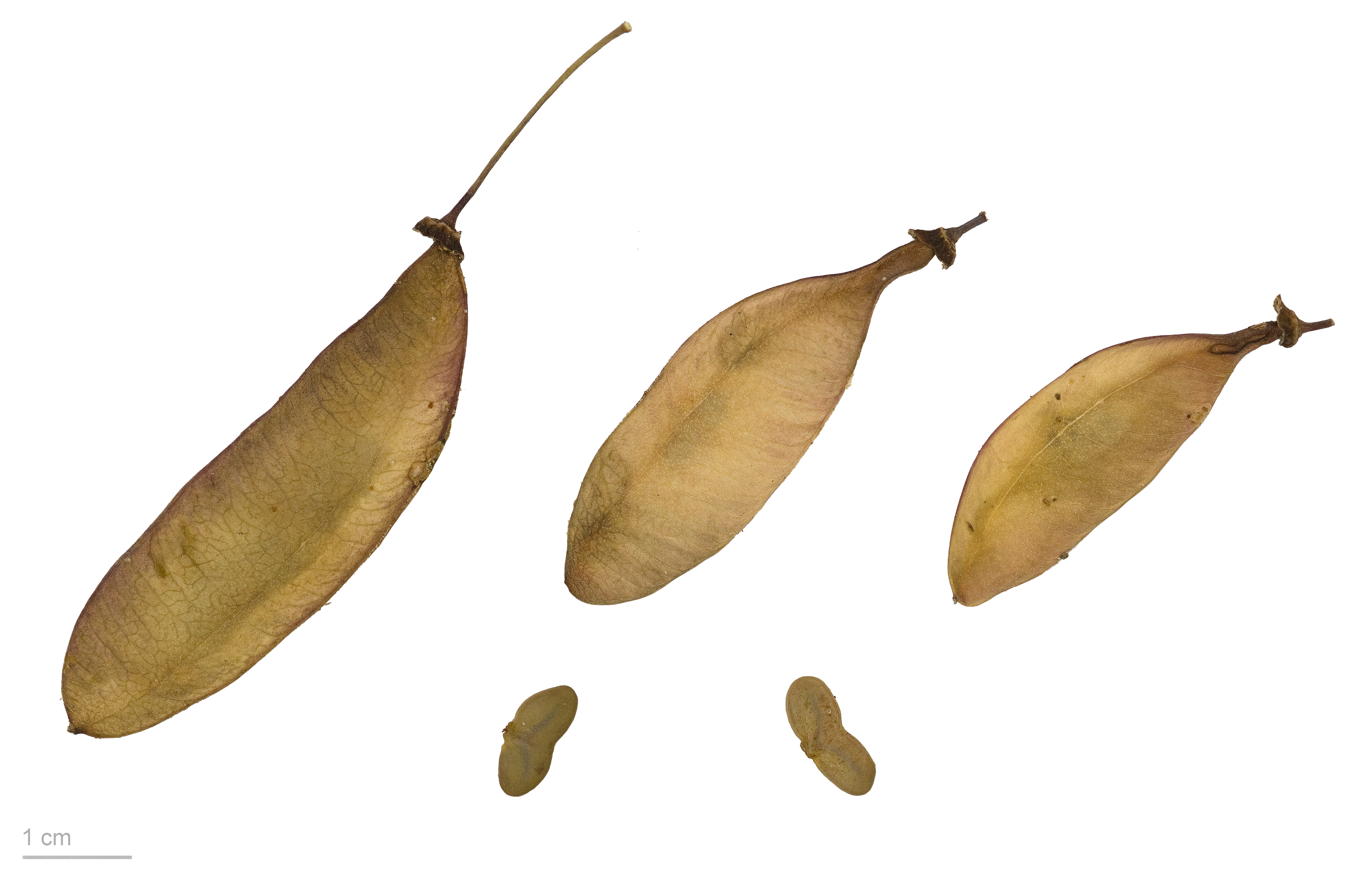
Haematoxylum brasiletto - MHNT

H. brasiletto occurs in Mexico, Belize, Costa Rica, Guatemala, El Salvador, Honduras, Nicaragua and Colombia. It grows in a range of habitats including deciduous tropical forests, xerophytic scrub and montane forests where it is associated with oak and pine. It is found growing in desert scrub in Baja California in association with elephant trees (Bursera microphylla), the woodrose (Merremia aurea) and the large Cardón cactus (Pachycereus pringlei).

== Uses ==
The wood of this tree is used in the making of bows for stringed instruments. The tree yields other valuable products and has been exported for several centuries. It was included in the London Pharmacopoeia of 1740, which listed logwood tea as being effective against tuberculosis and dysentery. The heartwood is used to produce dye for wool and cotton cloth and a pink colouring used in pharmaceuticals and toothpaste. The pigments hematoxylin and hematein can be extracted and are complex phenols similar to bioflavonoids. Extracts of hardwood chips are used as remedies by the Tarahumara Indians. Ethnobotanical uses mentioned in "Duke's Phytochemical and Ethnobotanical Databases" includes use as an astringent, a dentifrice, a refrigerant, for treating condyloma, erysipelas, fever, jaundice, inflammation and stomach pain. An extract of boiled heartwood chips is reported to have antibiotic properties, to reduce fever, and to act as a tonic to strengthen the body.

== See also ==
- Haematoxylum campechianum, the better-known variety of Logwood, similarly valuable as a dye
