= Hematein =

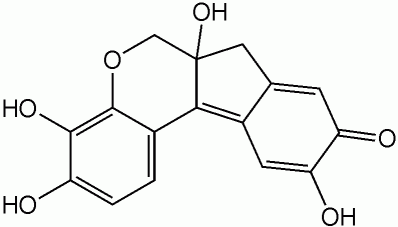

Names
- IUPAC name 3,4,6a,10-Tetrahydroxy-6,7-dihydroindeno[2,1-c]chromen-9-one
- Other names Haematein

Identifiers
CAS Number	475-25-2
3D model (JSmol)	Interactive image
ChEBI	CHEBI:90116
ChEMBL	ChEMBL1360563
ChemSpider	9732
ECHA InfoCard	100.006.813
MeSH	Hematein
PubChem CID	10138
UNII	88Q1SYD10B
CompTox Dashboard (EPA)	DTXSID40874767
- InChI: InChI=1S/C16H12O6/c17-10-2-1-8-13-9-4-12(19)11(18)3-7(9)5-16(13,21)6-22-15(8)14(10)20/h1-4,17,19-21H,5-6H2 Key: HLUCICHZHWJHLL-UHFFFAOYSA-N; InChI=1/C16H12O6/c17-10-2-1-8-13-9-4-12(19)11(18)3-7(9)5-16(13,21)6-22-15(8)14(10)20/h1-4,17,19-21H,5-6H2 Key: HLUCICHZHWJHLL-UHFFFAOYAU
- SMILES: C1C2=CC(=O)C(=CC2=C3C1(COC4=C3C=CC(=C4O)O)O)O

Properties
Chemical formula	C_{16}H_{12}O_{6}
Molar mass	300.266 g·mol^{−1}
- Except where otherwise noted, data are given for materials in their standard state (at 25 °C [77 °F], 100 kPa). verify (what is ?) Infobox references

Hematein (US spelling) or haematein is an oxidized derivative of haematoxylin, used in staining. Haematein should not be confused with haematin, which is a brown to black iron-containing pigment formed by decomposition of haemoglobin. In the Colour Index (but nowhere else), haematein is called haematine.

== Properties ==
Hematein exhibits indicator-like properties, being blue and less soluble in aqueous alkaline conditions, and red and more soluble in alcoholic acidic conditions. Dissolved haematein slowly reacts with atmospheric oxygen, yielding products that have not found applications.

== Applications ==
In acidic solutions, complexes of hematein with metals (usually aluminium or iron, but also chromium, zirconium and several others) are used as biological stains. Aluminium-haematein (haemalum) is the "routine" stain for cell nuclei in sections of human and other animal tissues. Metal-haematein stains are available also for objects other than nuclei, including myelin sheaths of nerve fibres and various cytoplasmic organelles. The color of the stained objects depends on the salt used. Aluminium-haematein complexes are usually blue, whereas ferric complexes are very dark blue or black.

Aluminium-haematein complexes (haemalum) bind to the chromatin of the nuclei of cells. Although haemalum staining methods have been in use since the 1860s, the chemical identity of the substance or substances that bind the dye-metal complex is still not known with certainty. Some histochemical investigations clearly indicate that a cationic aluminium-haematein complex is attracted to the phosphate anions of DNA. Others implicate the arginine residues of nuclear histones as the substrate of nuclear staining by haemalum.

Structures that stain with aluminium-hematein (haemalum) are often said to be basophilic, but the staining mechanism is not as simple as for basic (cationic) dyes with smaller molecules. Truly basophilic structures are ones containing nucleic acids or other polyanions such as glycosaminoglycans of extracellular matrix or acidic glycoproteins in many types of mucus. As usually used, aluminium-hematein stains only nuclear chromatin and a few other materials such as keratohyalin granules and calcified deposits. Very dilute solutions of aluminium-haematein, used at pH 3.2 (higher than is usual for staining), contain a cationic dye-metal complex and will slowly stain nucleic acids. Haemalum solutions used for routine staining are more concentrated and more acidic (pH 2-2.5) and are able to stain nuclei after chemical or enzymatic extraction of DNA and RNA from the tissue.
