= List of Albizia species =

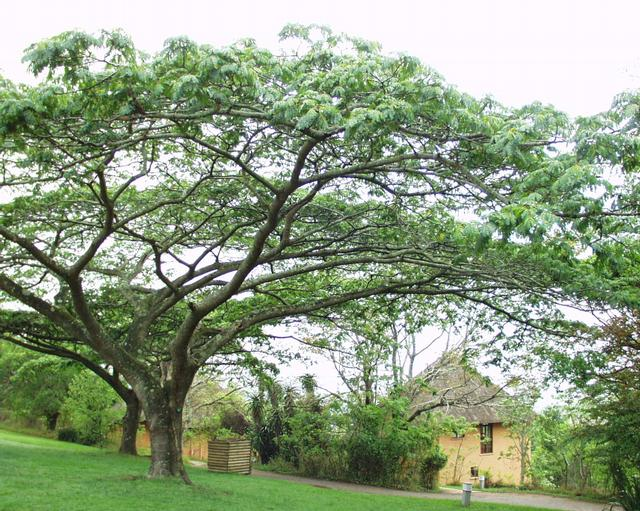
Cream albizia (A. adianthifolia)

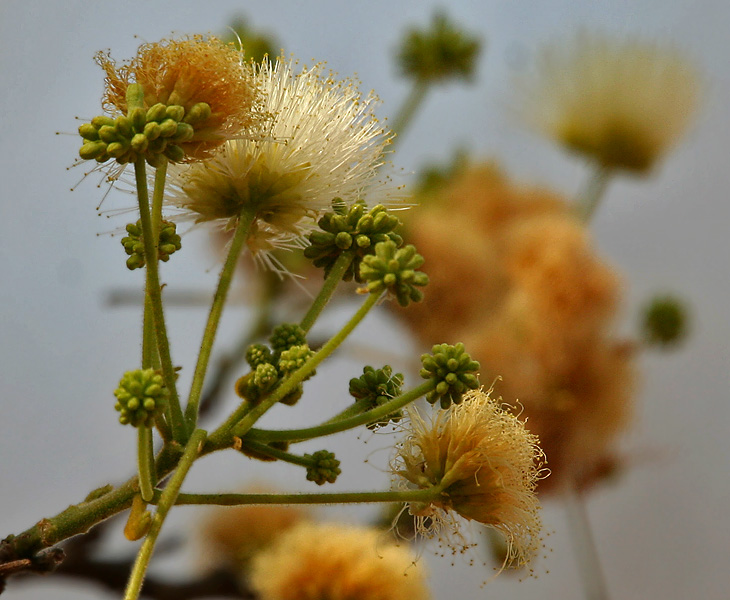
Albizia amara

There are approximately 99 accepted species in the legume tree genus Albizia, the silk trees, sirises, or albizias.

Numerous species placed in Albizia by early authors were eventually moved to other genera, particularly Archidendron and many other Ingeae, as well as certain Acacieae, Mimoseae, and even Caesalpinioideae and Faboideae.

The delimitation of Falcataria and Pithecellobium - close relatives of Albizia - is notoriously complex, with species having been moved between the genera time and again, and probably will continue to do so. Other closely related genera like Chloroleucon and Samanea are often merged with Albizia entirely.

== A ==
- Albizia acle (Blanco) Merr. (syn. Mimosa acle) - acle, akle
- Albizia adianthifolia (Schumach.) W.Wight (syn. Albizia fastigiata (E.Mey.) Oliv.)
- Albizia amara (Roxb.) Boivin
- Albizia androyensis Capuron
- Albizia anthelmintica (A.Rich.) Brongn. (syns. Albizia conjugatopinnata Vatke and A. umbalusiana Sim)
- Albizia antunesiana Harms
- Albizia arenicola R.Vig.
- Albizia atakataka Capuron
- Albizia attopeuensis (Pierre) I.C.Nielsen
- Albizia aurisparsa (Drake) R.Vig. ex Capuron
- Albizia aylmeri Hutch. ex Broun & Massey

== B ==
- Albizia balabaka Capuron
- Albizia bequaertii De Wild.
- Albizia bernieri E.Fourn. ex Villiers
- Albizia boinensis R.Vig.
- Albizia boivinii E.Fourn. – endemic to Madagascar
- Albizia brevifolia Schinz. (syn. Albizia parvifolia Burtt Davy)
- Albizia burmanica I.C.Nielsen

== C ==
- Albizia calcarea Y.H.Huang
- Albizia canescens Benth. – Belmont siris
- Albizia carrii Kanis
- Albizia chevalieri Harms
- Albizia chinensis (Osbeck) Merr. (syn. Albizia minyi De Wild.) – Chinese albizia
- Albizia commiphoroides Capuron
- Albizia coriaria Welw. ex Oliv. (syns. Albizia katangensis De Wild. and A. poissoni A.Chev.)
- Albizia corniculata (Lour.) Druce (syn. Albizia milletii Benth.)
- Albizia crassiramea Lace (syn. Albizia lancangensis Y.Y.Qian)

== D ==
- Albizia divaricata Capuron
- Albizia dolichadena (Kosterm.) I.C.Nielsen
- Albizia duclouxii Gagnep.

== E ==
- Albizia elegans Kurz
- Albizia eriorhachis Harms
- Albizia euryphylla Harms

== F ==
- Albizia ferruginea (Guill. & Perr.) Benth. (syn. Albizia corbisieri De Wild.) – musase
- Albizia forbesii Benth.

== G ==
- Albizia garrettii I.C.Nielsen
- Albizia glaberrima (Schumach. & Thonn.) Benth.
  - Albizia glaberrima var. glaberrima
  - Albizia glaberrima var. glabrescens (Oliv.) Brenan (syn. Albizia gillardinii G.C.C.Gilbert & Boutique)
  - Albizia glaberrima var. mpwapwensis Brenan
- Albizia grandibracteata Taub.
- Albizia greveana (Baill.) R.Baron – endemic to Madagascar
- Albizia guillainii Guillaumin
- Albizia gummifera (J.F.Gmel.) C.A.Sm. – tropical Africa and central Madagascar
  - Albizia gummifera var. ealensis (De Wild.) Brenan (syn. Albizia ealensis De Wild.)
  - Albizia gummifera var. gummifera (syn. Albizia mearnsii De Wild.)

== H ==
- Albizia harveyi E.Fourn. (syn. Albizia pospischilii Harms)

== I ==
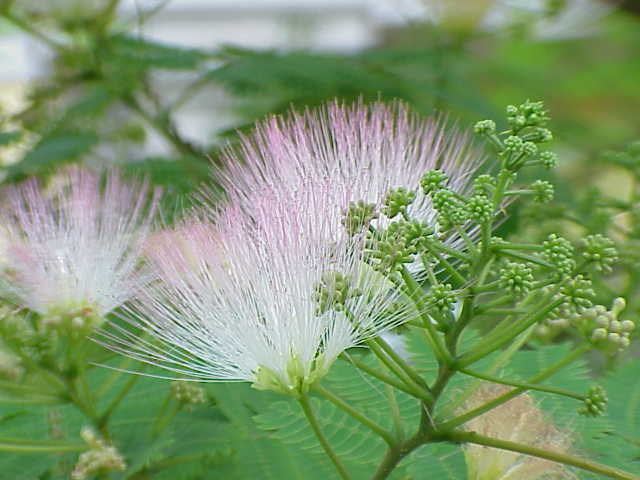
Flowers of pink siris (A. julibrissin)

- Albizia isenbergiana (A.Rich.) E.Fourn.

== J ==
- Albizia jaubertiana E.Fourn.
- Albizia julibrissin Durazz. – Persian silk tree, pink siris, nemu tree, bastard tamarind, Lenkoran acacia; shabkhosb (Persian); nemunoki, nemurinoki, nenenoki (Japanese)
  - Albizia julibrissin var. julibrissin (syn. Albizia rosea Carrière)
  - Albizia julibrissin var. mollis (Wall.) Benth.

== K ==
- Albizia kalkora (Roxb.) Prain (syns. Albizia glabrior (Koidz.) Ohwi, A. longepedunculata Hayata, A. macrophylla (Bunge) P.C.Huang ex Chakrab. & M.Gangop., and A. simeonis Harms) – Kalkora mimosa
- Albizia kostermansii I.C.Nielsen

== L ==
Albizia lebbeck

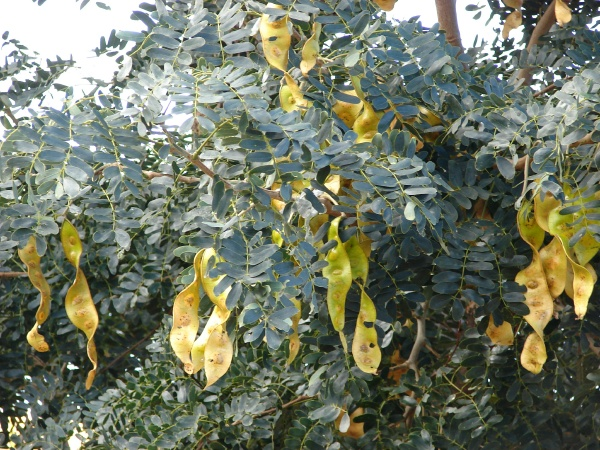
Seedpods of lebbeck (A. lebbeck)

- Albizia lankaensis Kosterm.
- Albizia lathamii Hole
- Albizia laurentii De Wild.
- Albizia lebbeck (L.) Benth. – Lebbeck, lebbek tree, frywood, koko, woman's-tongue tree
- Albizia lebbekoides (DC.) Benth. – Indian albizia
- Albizia lucida (Jacques) Benth. (syn. Albizia lucidior (Steud.) I.C.Nielson ex H.Hara)

== M ==
- Albizia mahalao Capuron
- Albizia mainaea Villiers – endemic to Madagascar
- Albizia malacophylla (A.Rich.) Walp.
- Albizia masikororum R.Vig.
- Albizia morombensis Capuron
- Albizia mossamedensis Torre
- Albizia myriophylla Benth.

== N ==
- Albizia numidarum Capuron

== O ==
- Albizia obbiadensis (Chiov.) Brenan
- Albizia odorata R.Vig.
- Albizia odoratissima (L.f.) Benth. (syn. Albizia orissensis K.C.Sahni & Bennet)
- Albizia oliveri Pellegr.
- Albizia ortegae Britton & Rose

== P ==
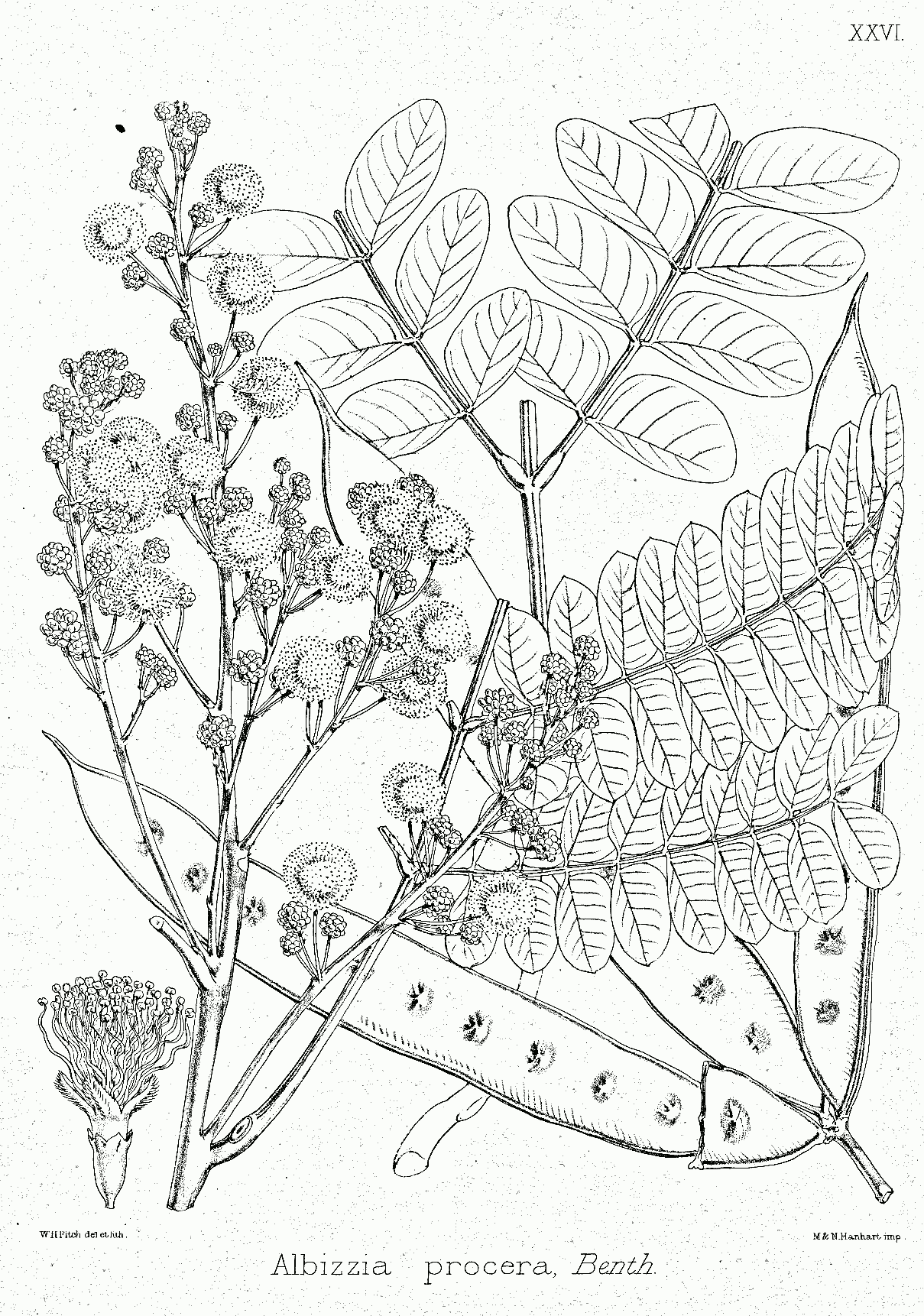
Tall albizia (A. procera) parts drawing

- Albizia papuensis Verdc.
- Albizia pedicellata Baker ex Benth.
- Albizia perrieri (Drake) R.Vig. ex Capuron
- Albizia petersiana (Bolle) Oliv.
- Albizia philippinensis I.C.Nielsen
- Albizia poilanei I.C.Nielsen
- Albizia polyphylla E.Fourn. – endemic to Madagascar
- Albizia procera (Roxb.) Benth. – tall albizia

== R ==
- Albizia retusa Benth.
  - Albizia retusa subsp. morobei I.C.Nielsen
  - Albizia retusa subsp. retusa (syn. Albizia littoralis Teijsm. & Binn.)
- Albizia rosulata (Kosterm.) I.C.Nielsen
- Albizia rubiginosa Miq.
- Albizia rufa (Hassk.) Benth.

== S ==
- Albizia sahafariensis Capuron
- Albizia salomonensis C.T.White
- Albizia saponaria (Lour.) Blume ex Miq. – white-flowered albizia
- Albizia schimperiana Oliv.
- Albizia sherriffii Baker f.
- Albizia splendens Miq.
- Albizia suluensis Grestner – Zulu albizia

== T ==
- Albizia tanganyicensis Baker f.
  - Albizia tanganyicensis subsp. adamsoniorum Brenan
  - Albizia tanganyicensis subsp. tanganyicensis
- Albizia thompsonii Brandis
- Albizia tomentella Miq.
  - Albizia tomentella var. rotundata (I.C.Nielsen) I.C.Nielsen
  - Albizia tomentella var. sumbawaensis (I.C.Nielsen
  - Albizia tomentella var. tomentella
- Albizia tulearensis R.Vig.

== U ==
- Albizia umbrosa (Wall.) Benth.

== V ==
- Albizia vaughanii Brenan
- Albizia verrucosa Capuron
- Albizia versicolor Welw. ex Oliv. (syn. Albizia mossambicensis Sim)
- Albizia vialeana Pierre
- Albizia viridis E.Fourn.

== W ==
- Albizia welwitschii Oliv.
- Albizia westerhuisii I.C.Nielsen

== X ==
- Albizia xerophytica J.Linares

== Z ==
- Albizia zimmermannii Harms (syn. Albizia gigantea A.Chev.)
- Albizia zygia (DC.) J.F.Macbr. (syns. Albizia brownei (Walp.) Oliv.. A. letestui Pellegr., and A. welwitschioides Schweinf. ex Baker f.)

== Formerly placed here ==
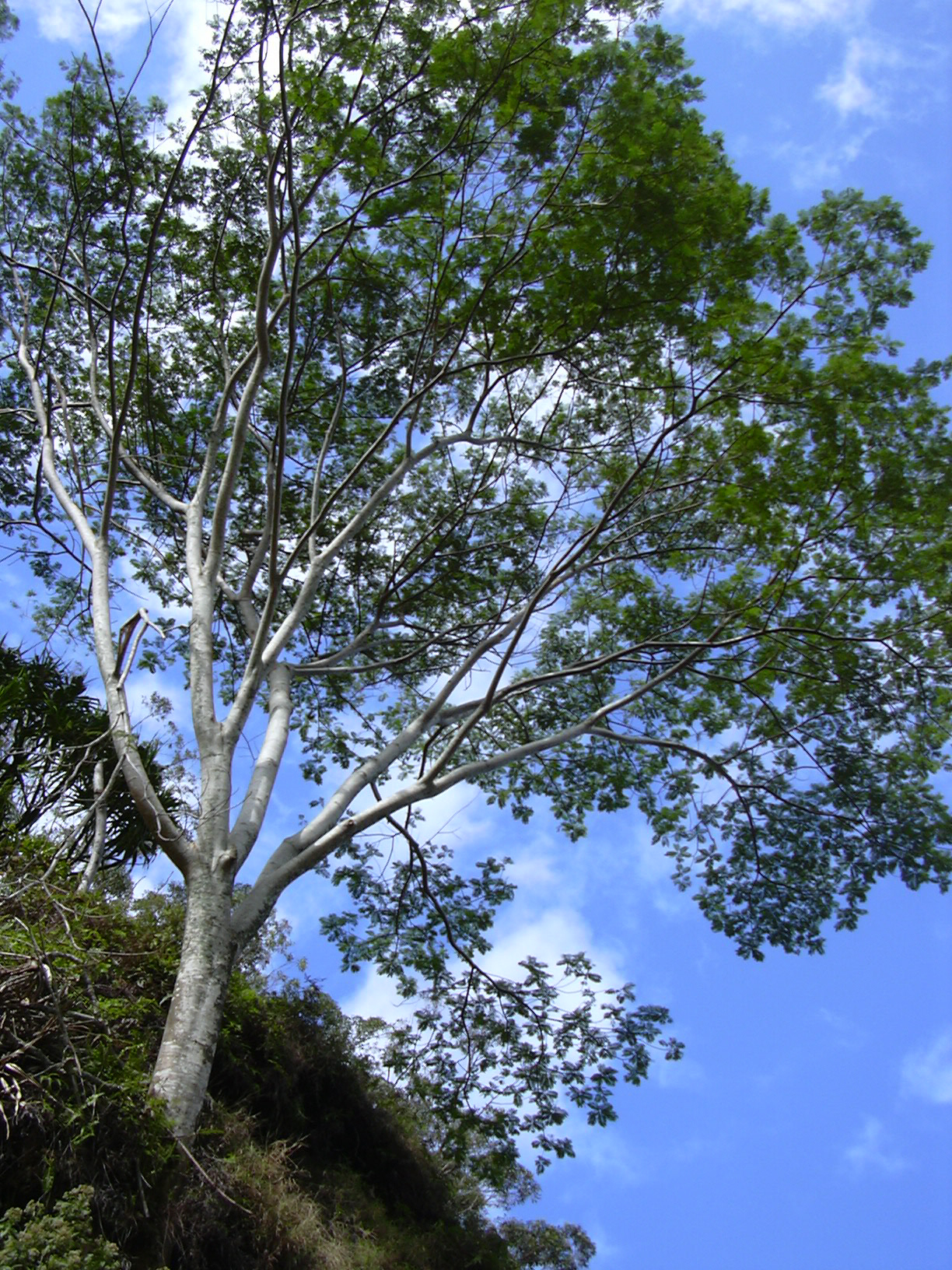
The Moluccan Albizia is now Falcataria falcata.

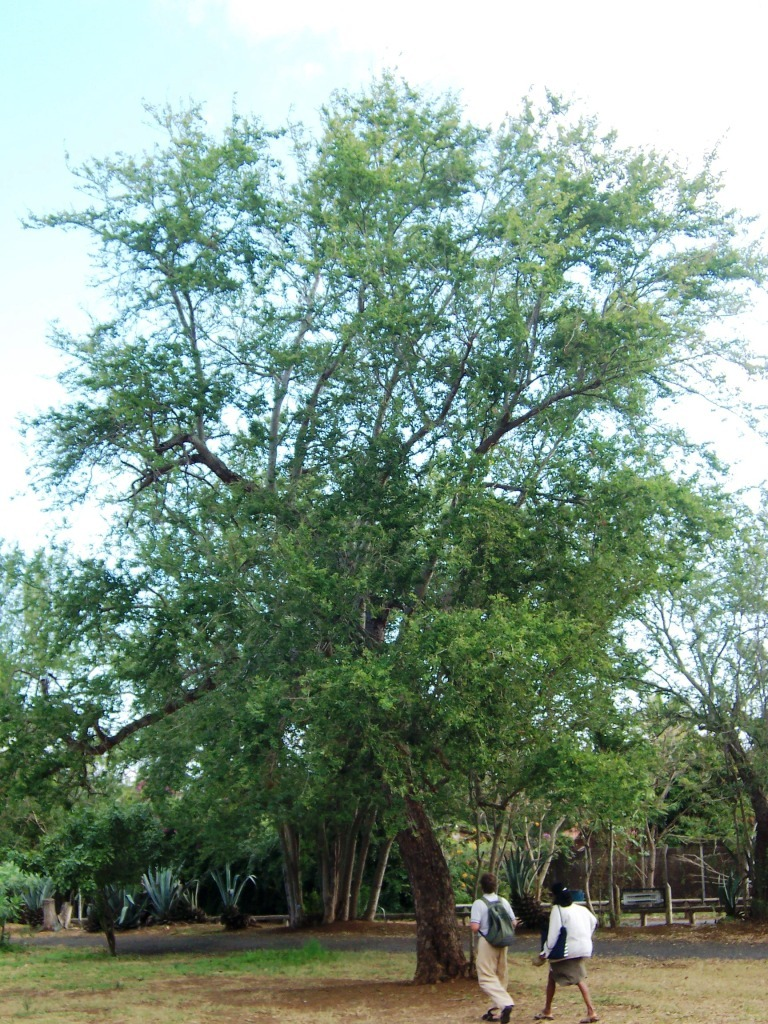
Madras Thorn is now Pithecellobium dulce.

- Acacia neumanniana (as Albizia neumanniana)
- Archidendron bubalinum (as Albizia bubalina)
- Archidendron clypearia (as Albizia clypearia)
  - Archidendron clypearia ssp. clypearia (as Albizia angulata and A. heterophylla)
- Archidendron ellipticum subsp. ellipticum (as Albizia fasciculata)
- Archidendron glomeriflorum (as Albizia glomeriflora)
- Archidendron ramiflorum (as Albizia pentzkeana)
- Archidendron jiringa (as Albizia jiringa)
- Archidendron lucyi (as Albizia lucyi)
- Archidendron oppositum (as Albizia macrothyrsa)
- Archidendron palauense (as Albizia papuana (Scheff.) F. Muell.)
- Archidendron ramiflorum (as Albizia ramiflora)
- Archidendron turgidum (as Albizia croizatiana, A. lucida auct. non Benth., A. turgida)
- Archidendron yunnanense (as Albizia yunnanensis (Kosterm.) Y.H. Huang)
- Archidendropsis fournieri (as Albizia fournieri)
- Archidendropsis fournieri var. auriculata (as Albizia schlechteri and A. subfalcata)
- Archidendropsis fulgens (as Albizia fulgens)
- Archidendropsis granulosa (as Albizia granulosa)
- Archidendropsis macradenia (as Albizia macradenia or Albizia comptonii)
- Archidendropsis streptocarpa (as Albizia streptocarpa, A. charpentieri, and A. obovata)
- Calliandra houstoniana var. anomala (as Albizia callistemon)
- Cathormion umbellatum ssp. moniliforme (as Albizia amoenissima)
- Chloroleucon mangense var. mangense (as Albizia marthae)
- Enterolobium cyclocarpum (Guanacaste; as Albizia longipes)
- Erythrophleum teysmannii (as Albizia teysmannii and A. cambodiana)
- Falcataria falcata (Moluccan albizia; as Albizia eymae, A. fulva, and A. moluccana)
- Havardia albicans (as Albizia lundellii and A. rubiginosa)
- Heliodendron basalticum (as Albizia basaltica)
- Heliodendron thozetianum (as Albizia thozetiana)
- Hesperalbizia occidentalis (palo escopeta; as Albizia obliqua, A. occidentalis, and A. plurijuga)
- Hydrochorea obliquifoliolata (as Albizia obliquifoliolata)
- Hydrochorea pedicellaris (as Albizia pedicellaris)
- Hydrochorea rhombifolia (as Albizia rhombifolia)
- Jupunba barbouriana var. barbouriana (as Albizia dubia)
- Osodendron altissimum (as Albizia altissima)
- Osodendron altissimum subsp. altissimum (syn. Albizia passargei)
- Osodendron dinklagei (as Albizia dinklagei)
- Osodendron leptophyllum (as Albizia flamignii and A. leptophylla)
- Pararchidendron pruinosum var. junghuhnianum (as Albizia tengerensis)
- Parasenegalia vogeliana (as Albizia leonardii)
- Paraserianthes lophantha (as Albizia lophantha and A. distachya)
  - Paraserianthes lophantha ssp. montana (as Albizia montana)
- Pithecellobium dulce (Madras thorn; as Albizia dulcis)
- Pithecellobium nicoyanum (as Albizia nicoyana)
- Pseudalbizzia adinocephala (as Albizia adinocephala)
- Pseudalbizzia berteroana (as Albizia berteroana)
- Pseudalbizzia buntingii (as Albizzia buntingii)
- Pseudalbizzia burkartiana (as Albizzia burkartiana)
- Pseudalbizzia coripatensis (as Albizia coripatensis)
- Pseudalbizzia decandra (as Albizia decandra)
- Pseudalbizzia edwallii (as Albizia edwallii and A. austrobrasilica)
- Pseudalbizzia glabripetala (as Albizia glabripetala)
- Pseudalbizzia inundata (as Albizia inundata)
- Pseudalbizzia multiflora (as Albizia multiflora)
- Pseudalbizzia niopoides (as Albizia niopoides)
- Pseudalbizzia niopoides var. niopoides (as Albizia hassleri and A. richardiana)
- Pseudalbizzia pistaciifolia (as Albizia pistaciifolia)
- Pseudalbizzia polycephala (as Albizia polycephala)
- Pseudalbizzia sinaloensis (as Albizia sinaloensis)
- Pseudalbizzia subdimidiata (as Albizia subdimidiata)
- Pseudalbizzia tomentosa (as Albizia tomentosa)
- Pseudalbizzia tomentosa var. nayaritensis (as Albizia nayaritensis)
- Pseudosamanea carbonaria (as Albizia carbonaria)
- Pseudosamanea cubana (as Albizia cubana)
- Pseudosamanea guachapele (as Albizia guachapele)
- Samanea saman (as Albizia saman and A. flavovirens)
- Schleinitzia megaladenia (as Albizia megaladenia)
- Albizia lugardi (as Albizia lugardi)
- Serianthes minahassae ssp. fosbergii (as Albizia melanesica)
- Serianthes minahassae ssp. minahassae (as Albizia minahassae)
- Senegalia pedicellata (as Albizia magallanensis)
- Senegalia torta (as Albizia sikharamensis)
- Vachellia sutherlandii (as Albizia sutherlandii)

and others
