= A. carbonaria =

A. carbonaria may refer to:

An abbreviation of a species name. In binomial nomenclature the name of a species is always the name of the genus to which the species belongs, followed by the species name (also called the species epithet). In A. carbonaria the genus name has been abbreviated to A. and the species has been spelled out in full. In a document that uses this abbreviation it should always be clear from the context which genus name has been abbreviated.

Some of the most common uses of A. carbonaria are:

- Acronicta carbonaria, a moth species found in Japan, the Korean Peninsula and the Russian Far East
- Albizia carbonaria, the naked albizia or cotton varay, a tree species in the genus Albizia

== See also ==
- Carbonaria (disambiguation)
