= Albizia elegans =

Scientific classification
- Kingdom: Plantae
- Clade: Tracheophytes
- Clade: Angiosperms
- Clade: Eudicots
- Clade: Rosids
- Order: Fabales
- Family: Fabaceae
- Subfamily: Caesalpinioideae
- Clade: Mimosoid clade
- Genus: Albizia
- Species: A. elegans

Binomial name
- Albizia elegans Kurz

Synonyms
- Albizia elegans (Ducke) L.Rico

Species of legume

Albizia elegans is a species of flowering plant in the family Fabaceae. It is found in Myanmar.

== See also ==
- List of Albizia species
