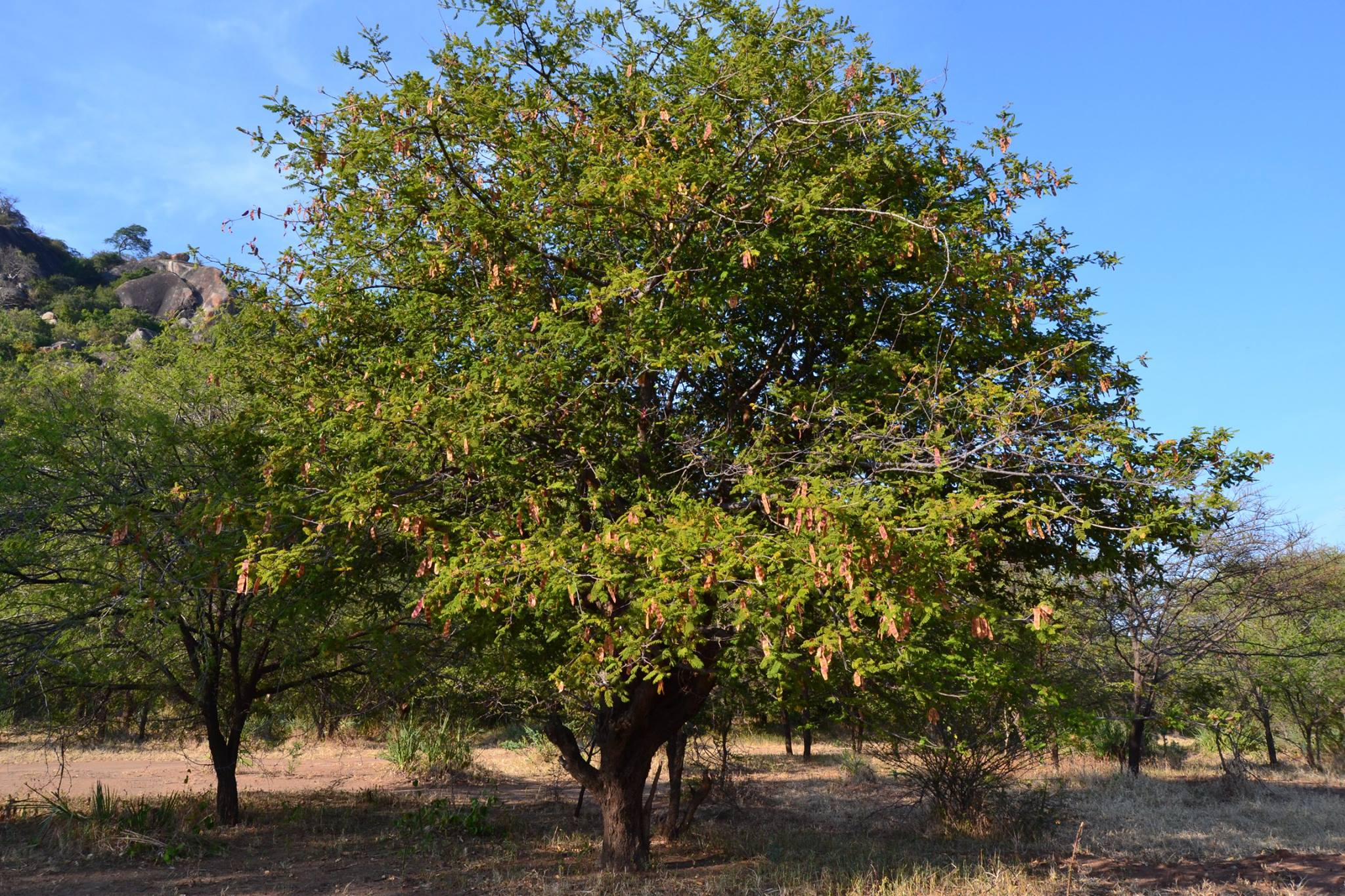

Scientific classification
- Kingdom: Plantae
- Clade: Tracheophytes
- Clade: Angiosperms
- Clade: Eudicots
- Clade: Rosids
- Order: Fabales
- Family: Fabaceae
- Subfamily: Caesalpinioideae
- Clade: Mimosoid clade
- Genus: Albizia
- Species: A. harveyi

Binomial name
- Albizia harveyi E.Fourn.

= Albizia harveyi =

Species of flowering plant

Albizia harveyi is a deciduous tree belonging to the family Fabaceae. It is distributed in eastern and southern Africa and quite similar in appearance to Albizia amara.

== Description ==
The tree grows as a multi-stemmed shrub or small tree, when growing as a tree, it is capable of reaching 15 m tall. It has a greyish to brown bark and stem that are covered in short velvety hairs. Leaves are bipinnately compound, with each leaf having up to 18 pairs of pinnae and each pinnae with up to 24 leaflets. Leaflets are oblong in shape, 6 mm long and up to 1.5 mm wide, with an acute to sickle shaped apex. Flowers are creamy white in color while its fruit is an oblong bownish pod that is many seeded.

== Distribution ==
Native to eastern and southern Africa, it occurs in the Democratic Republic of Congo and Kenya southwards to Northern South Africa. Found in woodlands.

== Phytochemistry ==
Research on the leaf extracts of Albizia harveyi indicated the presence of a flavanoid group of polyphenolic compounds that includes myricetin and quercetin.

== Uses ==
The wood is used in building poles and for firewood.
