= Albizia ferruginea =

Conservation status
- Near Threatened (IUCN 3.1)

Scientific classification
- Kingdom: Plantae
- Clade: Tracheophytes
- Clade: Angiosperms
- Clade: Eudicots
- Clade: Rosids
- Order: Fabales
- Family: Fabaceae
- Subfamily: Caesalpinioideae
- Clade: Mimosoid clade
- Genus: Albizia
- Species: A. ferruginea

Binomial name
- Albizia ferruginea (Guill. & Perr.) Benth.

Species of legume

Albizia ferruginea (locally known as musase) is a species of plant in the family Fabaceae (legumes). It is found in Angola, Benin, Burkina Faso, Cameroon, Central African Republic, the Republic of the Congo, the Democratic Republic of the Congo, Ivory Coast, Gabon, Gambia, Ghana, Guinea, Guinea-Bissau, Nigeria, Senegal, Sierra Leone, Togo, and Uganda. It is threatened by deforestation.

== Description ==
Albizia ferruginea is a medium to large sized tree that can grow up to 45 metres high and reach a diameter of up to 120 cm. The trunk is straight, with thick, rough bark that is yellowish brown in color while the slash is pale to orange brown in color; stems are densely covered in woolly hairs. Leaves are bipinnately compound and alternate, 4 - 6 pairs of pairs of pinnae and each pinnae having up to 6 - 13 pairs of leaflets. Leaflets, opposite, up to 2.5 cm long and 1 cm wide, they are narrowly oblong in shape, base is truncate while apex is rounded to obtuse. The inflorescence is axillary with the white and green stamen filaments crowded at the end a peduncle that can be up to 7 cm long; the flowers have a capitate shape and are subsessile. Fruit is a light yellowish brown pod, up to 20 cm long and 5 cm wide.

== Distribution and habitat ==
Occurs in West and Central Africa, from Senegal eastwards to Uganda and southwards to Angola.

== Uses ==
Albizia ferruginea is sometimes cultivated as an ornamental and shade tree.

Wood is used in carpentry work and also in construction.

The timber provides high chatoyance, with an average value above 20 PZC.
