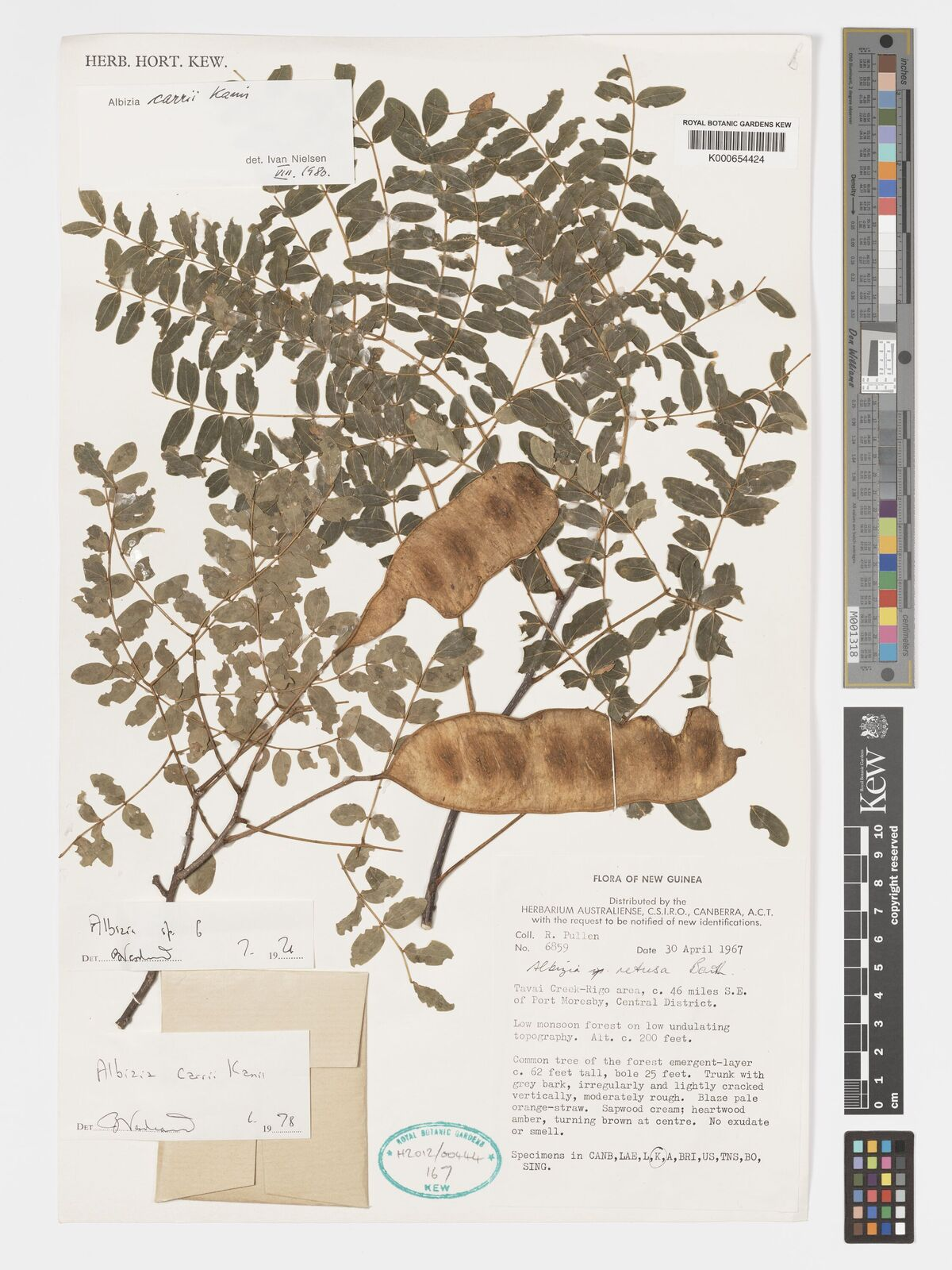

Conservation status
- Near Threatened (IUCN 3.1)

Scientific classification
- Kingdom: Plantae
- Clade: Tracheophytes
- Clade: Angiosperms
- Clade: Eudicots
- Clade: Rosids
- Order: Fabales
- Family: Fabaceae
- Subfamily: Caesalpinioideae
- Clade: Mimosoid clade
- Genus: Albizia
- Species: A. carrii

Binomial name
- Albizia carrii Kanis

= Albizia carrii =

Species of legume

Albizia carrii is a species of plant in the family Fabaceae. It is a tree native to the Papuan Peninsula of eastern New Guinea in Papua New Guinea and to Queensland in Australia.
