= Albizia vaughanii =

Conservation status
- Critically Endangered (IUCN 2.3)

Scientific classification
- Kingdom: Plantae
- Clade: Tracheophytes
- Clade: Angiosperms
- Clade: Eudicots
- Clade: Rosids
- Order: Fabales
- Family: Fabaceae
- Subfamily: Caesalpinioideae
- Clade: Mimosoid clade
- Genus: Albizia
- Species: A. vaughanii

Binomial name
- Albizia vaughanii Brenan, 1968

Synonyms
- Albizia vaghanii Brenan (lapsus)

Species of legume

Albizia vaughanii is a species of plant in the family Fabaceae. It is found only in Mauritius. Its natural habitat is subtropical or tropical dry forests.
