= Albizia coriaria =

Conservation status
- Least Concern (IUCN 3.1)

Scientific classification
- Kingdom: Plantae
- Clade: Embryophytes
- Clade: Tracheophytes
- Clade: Angiosperms
- Clade: Eudicots
- Clade: Rosids
- Order: Fabales
- Family: Fabaceae
- Subfamily: Caesalpinioideae
- Clade: Mimosoid clade
- Genus: Albizia
- Species: A. coriaria

Binomial name
- Albizia coriaria Welw. ex Oliv.

Synonyms
- Feuilleea coriaria (Welw. ex Oliv.) Kuntze; Albizia katangensis De Wild.; Albizia poissonii A.Chev.

Species of tree

Albizia coriaria is a deciduous tree native to Tropical Africa belonging to the family Fabaceae, the root and stem bark are widely used in traditional medicine to treat a variety of diseases.

== Description ==
A medium to large sized and heavily branched tree capable of reaching up to 18–36 m (59–118 ft) tall. The base of the tree may sometimes have short buttressed roots, its crown is flat and spreading, while the bark is brown to dark colored and having irregular scales. Leaves are bipinnately compound and the stems and rachis are often covered in short hairs. Leaflets are up to 3.5 cm (1.4 in) long and 1.5 cm (0.6 in) wide, they are narrowly oblong to elliptic in shape with a rounded or obtuse apex. The inflorescence is in hemispherical heads and fragrant, the petals are white and stamens have a reddish top and whitish base. The fruit is a brownish pod, reaching up to 12–24 cm (4.7–9.4 in) long.

== Distribution ==
The species is native to Tropical Africa, from Ivory Coast in West Africa eastwards to Ethiopia and Kenya and southwards to Angola and Tanzania.

== Chemistry ==
In ethnomedcine, some studies have been conducted on the leaves, roots and stem bark of the species. Oleane and acacic acid type saponins were identified in root extracts of the species. The triterpenoids, lupeol and lepenone, betulic acid and benzyl alcohol have been identified in extracts of the plant.

== Uses ==
Stem bark extracts of the species are used in decoctions for the treatment of diarrhea in Nyanza, Kenya. The bark stem is also used to treat dermatological, respiratory and odontological ailments. However, consumption of high doses of herbal remedies containing Albizia coriaria can be toxic.

Wood is traded as timber and also used in making poles, pestles and mortars and in making furniture. It is also used for firewood and charcoal.
