= Albizia lathamii =

Conservation status
- Near Threatened (IUCN 3.1)

Scientific classification
- Kingdom: Plantae
- Clade: Tracheophytes
- Clade: Angiosperms
- Clade: Eudicots
- Clade: Rosids
- Order: Fabales
- Family: Fabaceae
- Subfamily: Caesalpinioideae
- Clade: Mimosoid clade
- Genus: Albizia
- Species: A. lathamii

Binomial name
- Albizia lathamii Hole

Species of legume

Albizia lathamii also known as stipulated iris, natoonjal, kal bage, hotte bage and sikarke, is a species of flowering plant in the family Fabaceae, subfamily Mimosoideae. The species is endemic to central and peninsular India, where it occurs occasionally in scrub jungles and dry deciduous forests at elevations of 400–700 m.

== Description ==
Albizia lathamii, is a much-branched small tree characterized by purplish-red bark with conspicuous white lenticels. The pods are relatively small. The species flowers and fruits between November and February.

== Distribution ==
This species is native to India, with records from the Bellary district in Karnataka. Its wider distribution is limited to central and peninsular parts of the country.

== Conservation ==
The conservation status of Albizia lathamii has been evaluated as near threatened by the International Union for Conservation of Nature (IUCN) as of 2024.
