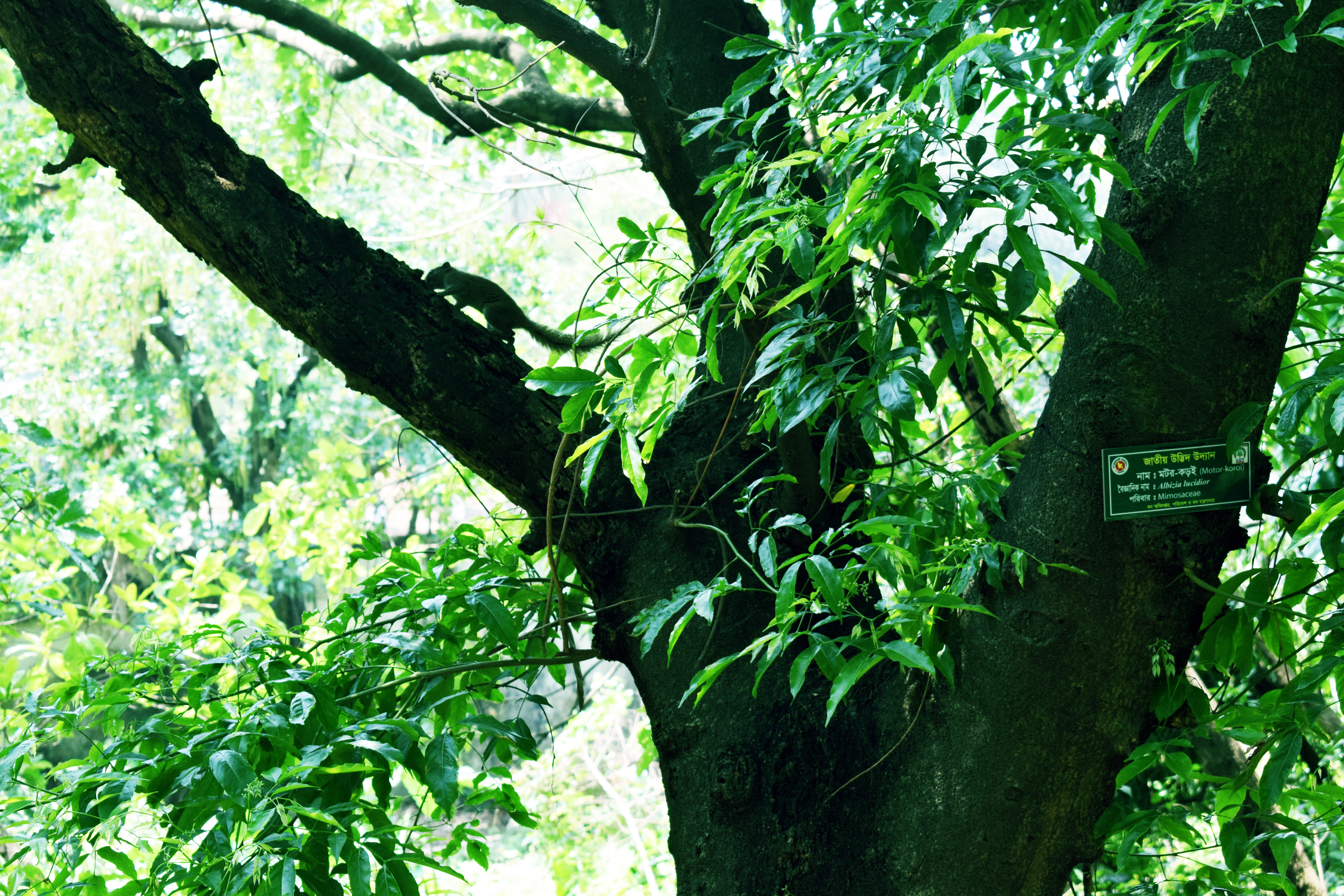

Scientific classification
- Kingdom: Plantae
- Clade: Tracheophytes
- Clade: Angiosperms
- Clade: Eudicots
- Clade: Rosids
- Order: Fabales
- Family: Fabaceae
- Subfamily: Caesalpinioideae
- Clade: Mimosoid clade
- Genus: Albizia
- Species: A. lucida

Binomial name
- Albizia lucida (Jacques) Benth. (1844)

Synonyms
- Acacia lucida Jacques (1837); Albizia bracteata Dunn (1895); Albizia lucidior (Steud.) I.C.Nielsen ex H.Hara (1979), nom. superfl.; Albizia gamblei Prain (1897); Albizia meyeri Ricker (1918), nom. superfl.; Feuilleea lucida (Jacques) Kuntze (1891), nom. superfl.; Inga lucida Wall. (1831), not validly publ.; Inga lucidior Steud. (1840); Mimosa lucida Roxb. (1832), nom. illeg.; Pithecellobium bigeminum Hassk. (1855), nom. illeg.

= Albizia lucida =

Species of legume

Albizia lucida is an Asian tree species in the Acacia clade. It ranges from the western Himalayas through Indochina and southern China to Taiwan. No subspecies are listed in the Catalogue of Life. In Vietnam it may be called bản xe (or đái bò).

== Description ==
This tree species grows up to 40 m, in tropical forests up to 1200 m elevation. The leaves are (single) pinnate, in 1-3 pairs. The seed pods are yellow and glabrous, typically 160-200 x 25-30mm, containing less than ten 8-9mm seeds.

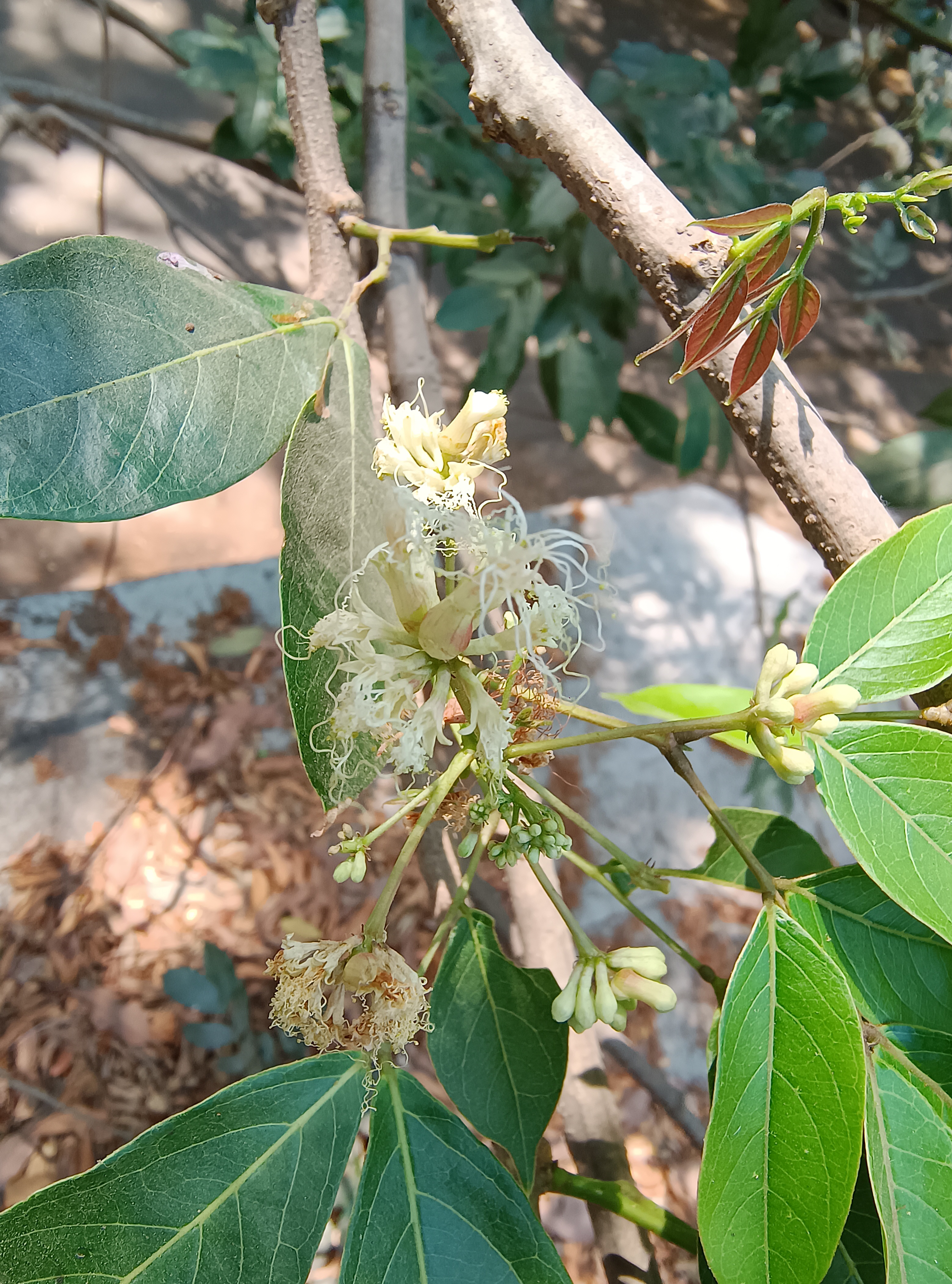
Flower of Albizia lucida

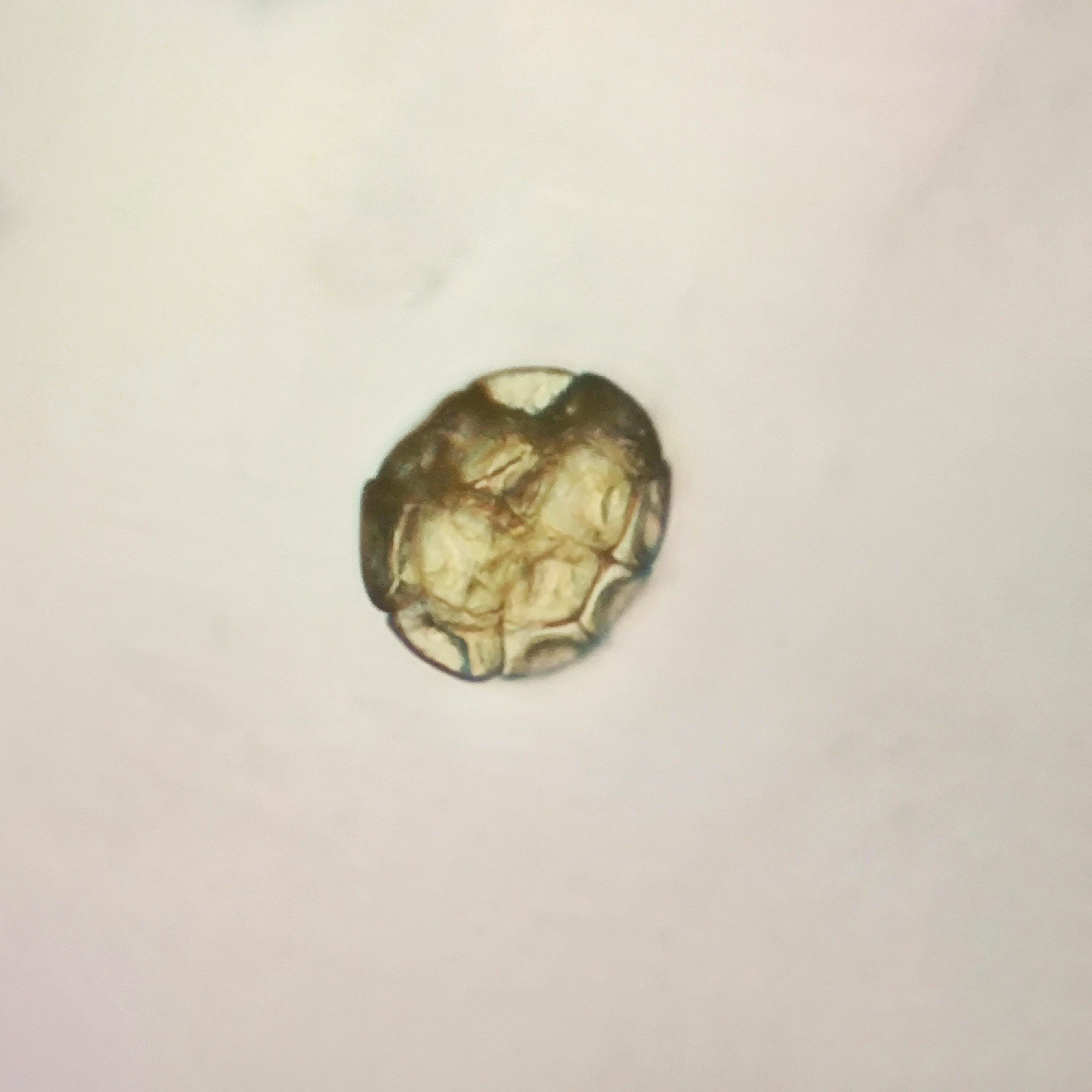
Pollen grains of Albizia lucida
