= Albizia obbiadensis =

Conservation status
- Vulnerable (IUCN 2.3)

Scientific classification
- Kingdom: Plantae
- Clade: Tracheophytes
- Clade: Angiosperms
- Clade: Eudicots
- Clade: Rosids
- Order: Fabales
- Family: Fabaceae
- Subfamily: Caesalpinioideae
- Clade: Mimosoid clade
- Genus: Albizia
- Species: A. obbiadensis

Binomial name
- Albizia obbiadensis (Chiov.) Brenan

Synonyms
- Acacia nervulosa Chiov. Acacia obbiadensis Chiov. Acacia redacta Chiov.

Species of legume

Albizia obbiadensis is a species of plant in the family Fabaceae. It is found only in Somalia.
