= Albizia suluensis =

Conservation status
- Endangered (IUCN 3.1)

Scientific classification
- Kingdom: Plantae
- Clade: Tracheophytes
- Clade: Angiosperms
- Clade: Eudicots
- Clade: Rosids
- Order: Fabales
- Family: Fabaceae
- Subfamily: Caesalpinioideae
- Clade: Mimosoid clade
- Genus: Albizia
- Species: A. suluensis

Binomial name
- Albizia suluensis Gerstner

Species of legume

Albizia suluensis, the Zulu albizia, is a species of plant in the family Fabaceae. It is found only in KwaZulu-Natal Province of South Africa. It is threatened by habitat loss.
