= Albizia chevalieri =

Scientific classification
- Kingdom: Plantae
- Clade: Embryophytes
- Clade: Tracheophytes
- Clade: Angiosperms
- Clade: Eudicots
- Clade: Rosids
- Order: Fabales
- Family: Fabaceae
- Subfamily: Caesalpinioideae
- Clade: Mimosoid clade
- Genus: Albizia
- Species: A. chevalieri

Binomial name
- Albizia chevalieri Harms

Species of flowering plant

Albizia chevalieri is a shrub or small tree within the family Fabaceae. It is native to West Africa and parts of Central Africa and is found in drier parts of the savanna.

== Description ==
A. chevalieri is a shrub or small tree that grows up to 7 m (23 ft) tall, occasionally reaching 12 m (39 ft) tall, with a diameter that can reach 60–90 cm (24–35 in). It has a fairly open, spreading crown. The bark has a pale gray hue and is characterized by corky scales and deep fissures. The slash appears yellowish, and the stems typically have lenticels that vary from grey to brown in color.

The leaves have a bipinnately compound structure, with 10–15 pairs of pinnae and approximately 10–20 leaflets per pinnae. The leaflets have a lanceolate shape with a sharp tip and measure up to 1 cm (0.39 in) in length and 4 mm (0.16 in) in width. The flowers, arranged in globular balls, have a reddish colour with whitish edges. The fruits resemble an oblong, glabrous pod.

== Distribution ==
A. chevalieri is native to West and Central Africa, commonly found in the drier parts of the Sudan savannah as well as the Sahel savanna.

== Relation to humans ==
In traditional medicine, leaf extracts are used in the treatment of diabetes in parts of Nigeria and Cameroon and are also used in decoctions to treat dysentery in Northern Nigeria. The stem bark is also prepared in purgative decoctions.
