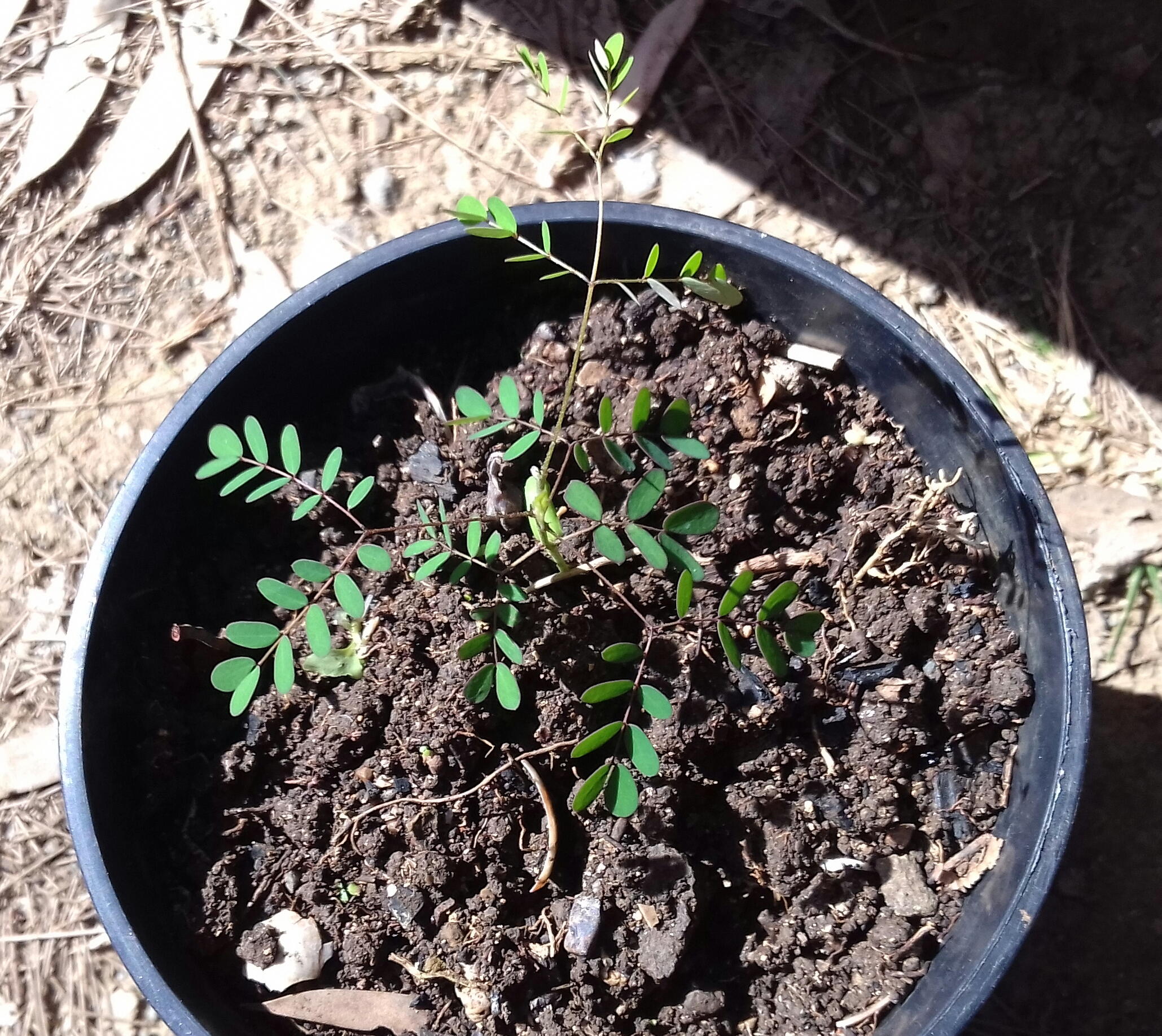
- Small Albizia guillainii in a pot

Conservation status
- Vulnerable (IUCN 3.1)

Scientific classification
- Kingdom: Plantae
- Clade: Tracheophytes
- Clade: Angiosperms
- Clade: Eudicots
- Clade: Rosids
- Order: Fabales
- Family: Fabaceae
- Subfamily: Caesalpinioideae
- Clade: Mimosoid clade
- Genus: Albizia
- Species: A. guillainii

Binomial name
- Albizia guillainii Guillaumin

= Albizia guillainii =

Species of legume

Albizia guillainii is a species of plant in the family Fabaceae. It is found only in New Caledonia. It is threatened by habitat loss.
