= Albizia glaberrima =

Scientific classification
- Kingdom: Plantae
- Clade: Tracheophytes
- Clade: Angiosperms
- Clade: Eudicots
- Clade: Rosids
- Order: Fabales
- Family: Fabaceae
- Subfamily: Caesalpinioideae
- Clade: Mimosoid clade
- Genus: Albizia
- Species: A. glaberrima

Binomial name
- Albizia glaberrima (Schumach. & Thonn.) Benth.

Species of plant

Albizia glaberrima is a deciduous tree found in Tropical Africa. It belongs to the family Fabaceae. It is traded under the name 'white nongo' and it is well distributed in West, Central, East and parts of Southern Africa.

== Description ==
A medium-sized tree that can reach up to 20–30 m in height, it has a flattened crown with foliage spreading like an umbrella. The trunk is straight and cylindrical but sometimes irregular while the bark is greyish in color and lenticellate. Leaves bipinnately compound with 1 to 4 pairs of pinnae, each pinnae having 3 to 6 pairs of leaflets. Leaflets are oblique to ovate in outline, up to 5–7 cm long and 3 cm wide; petiolules are up to 1–2 mm long, both the petiolules and rachis are thin and devoid of hair. Flowers are in axillary heads on a peduncle that is up to 4 cm long while the stamens are whitish in color. Fruit is an oblong pod up to 26 cm long and 4 cm wide, yellow-brown in color.

== Distribution and habitat ==
The species occurs in tropical Africa from Guinea-Bissau in West Africa eastwards to Sudan and southwards to Mozambique. It is also found in Comoros and Madagascar. It is found in semi-deciduous and lowland rain forests, sub montane forests and riparian forests zones.

== Uses ==
In parts of Northern Ghana, extracts are used as a cough suppressant while in Nigeria, stem bark extracts are soaked in water as preparation for a decoction to treat inflammation, pain management and fever. In Tanzania root extracts are prepared to treat schistosomiasis.

The wood is used in making tool handles, beehives, mortars and in carpentry work for making beds and doors.
