= Albizia vialeana =

Scientific classification
- Kingdom: Plantae
- Clade: Tracheophytes
- Clade: Angiosperms
- Clade: Eudicots
- Clade: Rosids
- Order: Fabales
- Family: Fabaceae
- Subfamily: Caesalpinioideae
- Clade: Mimosoid clade
- Genus: Albizia
- Species: A. vialeana

Binomial name
- Albizia vialeana Pierre, Fl. Forest. Cochinch. t. 399 A. 1899

Species of legume

Albizia vialeana is a tree species in the Acacia clade of the family Fabaceae, found in parts of Indo-China. Its wood is used for fuel.

== Description ==
This tree species typically grows to 10–15 m. The leaves are bipinnate, divided into 4-6 pairs of pinnae, each with 12-16 pairs of leaflets. The seed pods are glabrous, approximately 110 x 30mm, containing more than ten 6-8mm seeds, falling in late January to early March.

== Distribution & habitat ==
The plant is found in east Thailand, Cambodia and Vietnam. It occurs in open and semi-dense formations in tropical forests up to 1200m altitude.

== Vernacular names ==
In Vietnam it may be called sống rắn cây or kết, but may be confused with similar species in the genus called hợp hoan. One name it is given in Cambodia is châmriëk ôhs (châmriëk="firewood", Khmer).

== Uses ==
The wood makes excellent firewood.
