= Pseudosamanea cubana =

Conservation status
- Vulnerable (IUCN 2.3)

Scientific classification
- Kingdom: Plantae
- Clade: Tracheophytes
- Clade: Angiosperms
- Clade: Eudicots
- Clade: Rosids
- Order: Fabales
- Family: Fabaceae
- Subfamily: Caesalpinioideae
- Clade: Mimosoid clade
- Genus: Pseudosamanea
- Species: P. cubana

Binomial name
- Pseudosamanea cubana (Britton & Rose) Barneby & J.W.Grimes

Synonyms
- Albizia cubana Britton & Wilson; Pithecellobium bacona Urb.

Genus of legumes

Pseudosamanea cubana is a tree species in the legume family (Fabaceae). It is found only in Cuba.
