= Havardia albicans =

Scientific classification
- Kingdom: Plantae
- Clade: Tracheophytes
- Clade: Angiosperms
- Clade: Eudicots
- Clade: Rosids
- Order: Fabales
- Family: Fabaceae
- Subfamily: Caesalpinioideae
- Clade: Mimosoid clade
- Genus: Havardia
- Species: H. albicans

Binomial name
- Havardia albicans (Kunth) Britton & Rose
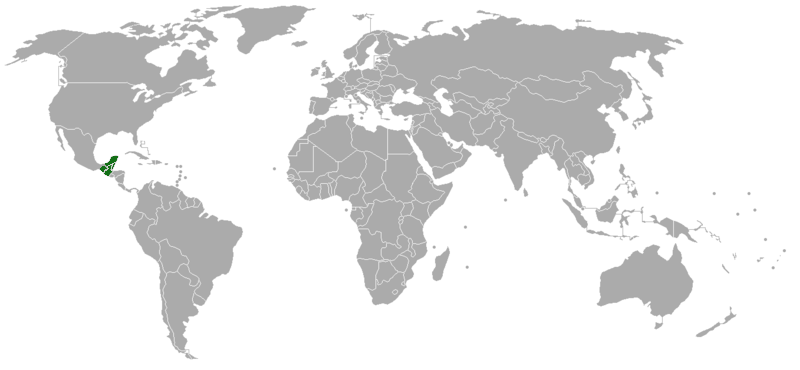
- Range of Havardia albicans

Synonyms
- See text

Species of plant

Havardia albicans is a perennial tree of the family Fabaceae that grows to 5 meters tall. It is native to Mexico, the Caribbean and Central America, in regions around the Yucatan Peninsula. Common names for it include chucum and cuisache. It is reputed to be psychoactive. Its sap can be boiled and added to plaster to make waterproof stucco, and this may explain the longevity of Mayan plaster.

Junior synonyms are:

- Acacia albicans Kunth
- Albizia lundellii Standl.
- Albizia rubiginosa Standl.
- Feuilleea albicans (Kunth) Kuntze
- Pithecellobium albicans (Kunth) Benth.
- Pithecolobium albicans (Kunth) Benth. (lapsus)
