= Pseudosamanea =

Scientific classification
- Kingdom: Plantae
- Clade: Tracheophytes
- Clade: Angiosperms
- Clade: Eudicots
- Clade: Rosids
- Order: Fabales
- Family: Fabaceae
- Subfamily: Caesalpinioideae
- Clade: Mimosoid clade
- Genus: Pseudosamanea; Harms

Species
- See text.

Genus of plants

Pseudosamanea is a genus of flowering plant in the family Fabaceae, native from southern Mexico to Venezuela and Ecuador, and to Cuba. The genus was established in 1930.

== Species ==
As of January 2023, Plants of the World Online accepted the following species:

- Pseudosamanea carbonaria (Britton) E.J.M.Koenen
- Pseudosamanea cubana (Britton & P.Wilson) Barneby & J.W.Grimes
- Pseudosamanea guachapele (Kunth) Harms
