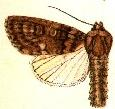

Scientific classification
- Kingdom: Animalia
- Phylum: Arthropoda
- Clade: Pancrustacea
- Class: Insecta
- Order: Lepidoptera
- Superfamily: Noctuoidea
- Family: Noctuidae
- Genus: Acronicta
- Species: A. carbonaria

Binomial name
- Acronicta carbonaria Graeser, 1889

Synonyms
- Hylonycta carbonaria (Graeser, 1889); Acronicta brumosa Leech, 1889

= Acronicta carbonaria =

Species of moth

Acronicta carbonaria is a moth of the family Noctuidae. It is found in Japan (Honshu, Shikoku, and Kyushu), the Korean Peninsula, and the Russian Far East.

The wingspan is 45–50 mm (1.8–2.0 in). The larvae feed on Quercus, including Quercus acutissima.
