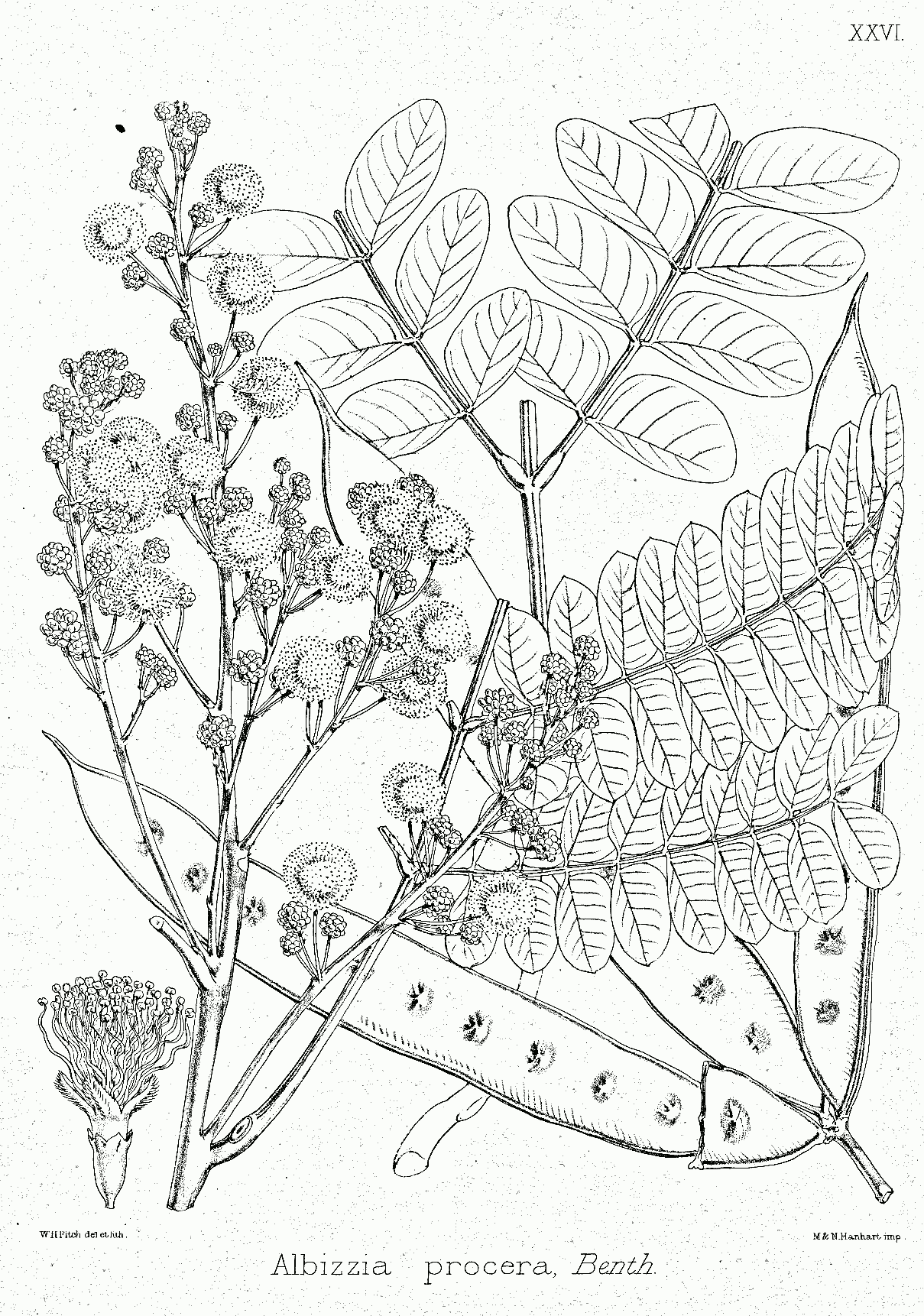

Conservation status
- Least Concern (IUCN 3.1)

Scientific classification
- Kingdom: Plantae
- Clade: Embryophytes
- Clade: Tracheophytes
- Clade: Spermatophytes
- Clade: Angiosperms
- Clade: Eudicots
- Clade: Rosids
- Order: Fabales
- Family: Fabaceae
- Subfamily: Caesalpinioideae
- Clade: Mimosoid clade
- Genus: Albizia
- Species: A. procera

Binomial name
- Albizia procera (Roxb.) Benth.

= Albizia procera =

Species of tree

Albizia procera, commonly known as white siris or karoi tree, is a species of large tree found natively in southeast Asia and India. It is most commonly found in open forests, but may also be found on the margins of rain forests and in monsoon and gallery forests. It is considered an invasive species in South Africa.

The genus name Albizia honors the Florentine naturalist Filippo del Albizzi, while the species name is derived from the Latin word 'procerus', meaning 'very tall or high'.

== Description ==
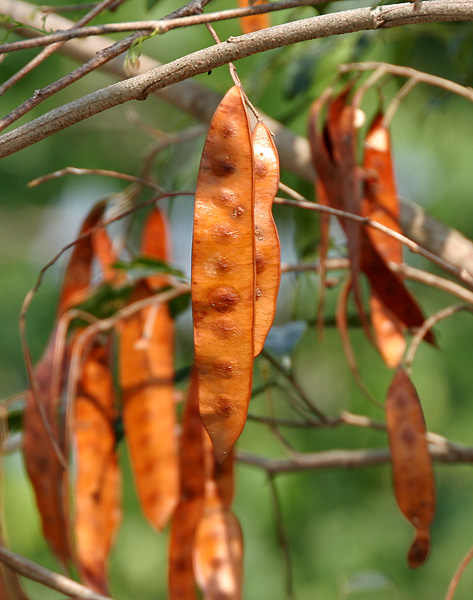
A. procera fruits

A. procera is typically between 7 and 15 meters tall, although occasionally it reaches 30 meters in height. It is deciduous, going leafless in the dry season (August–September). The leaves are bi-pinnate, with 2–5 pairs of sub-opposite pinnae and a 10–30 centimeter rachis. The bark is smooth and light-colored, exfoliating to reveal a reddish color underneath. It produces sessile greenish-yellow flowers with long, threadlike white stamens, creating a puffball effect; these are borne on racemes 8–25 centimeters long. The flowers give way to rich red or reddish-brown flattened pods containing 6–12 small, greenish-brown seeds.

== Uses ==
A. procera is cultivated for timber or as fuel in Asia, Africa and the Americas. In India, the leaves are considered good fodder for animals such as cows, sheep, goats, and elephants. The wood makes good charcoal, and the resin is a good substitute for gum arabic. The leaves are said to be insecticidal, while the bark may be used to make fish poison.
