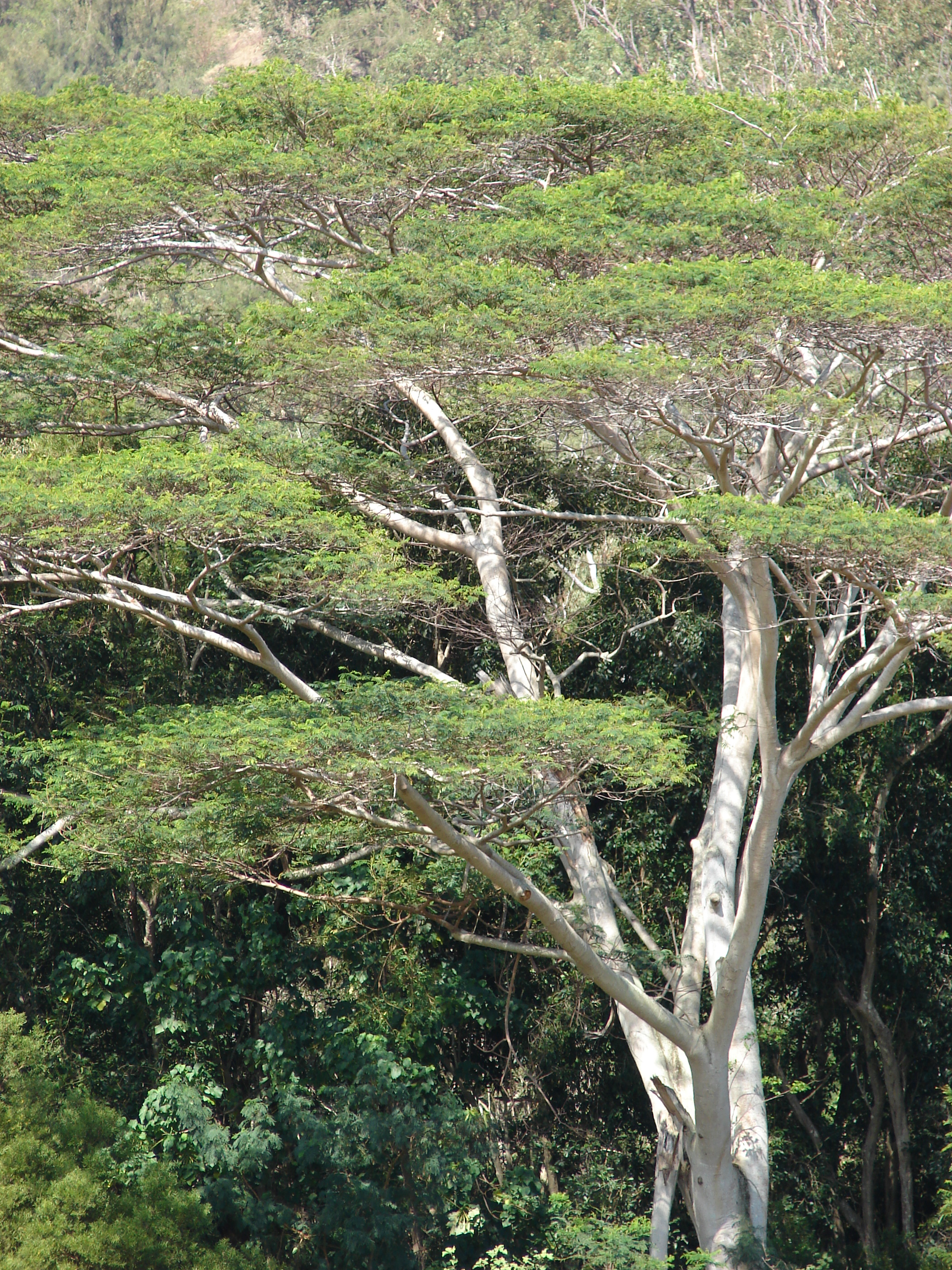
- Falcataria moluccana

Scientific classification
- Kingdom: Plantae
- Clade: Tracheophytes
- Clade: Angiosperms
- Clade: Eudicots
- Clade: Rosids
- Order: Fabales
- Family: Fabaceae
- Subfamily: Caesalpinioideae
- Clade: Mimosoid clade
- Genus: Falcataria (I.C.Nielsen) Barneby & J.W.Grimes (1996)

Species
- Falcataria falcata (L.) Greuter & R.Rankin; Falcataria pullenii (Verdc.) Gill.K.Br., D.J.Murphy & Ladiges; Falcataria toona (F.M.Bailey) Gill.K.Br., D.J.Murphy & Ladiges

= Falcataria =

Genus of legumes

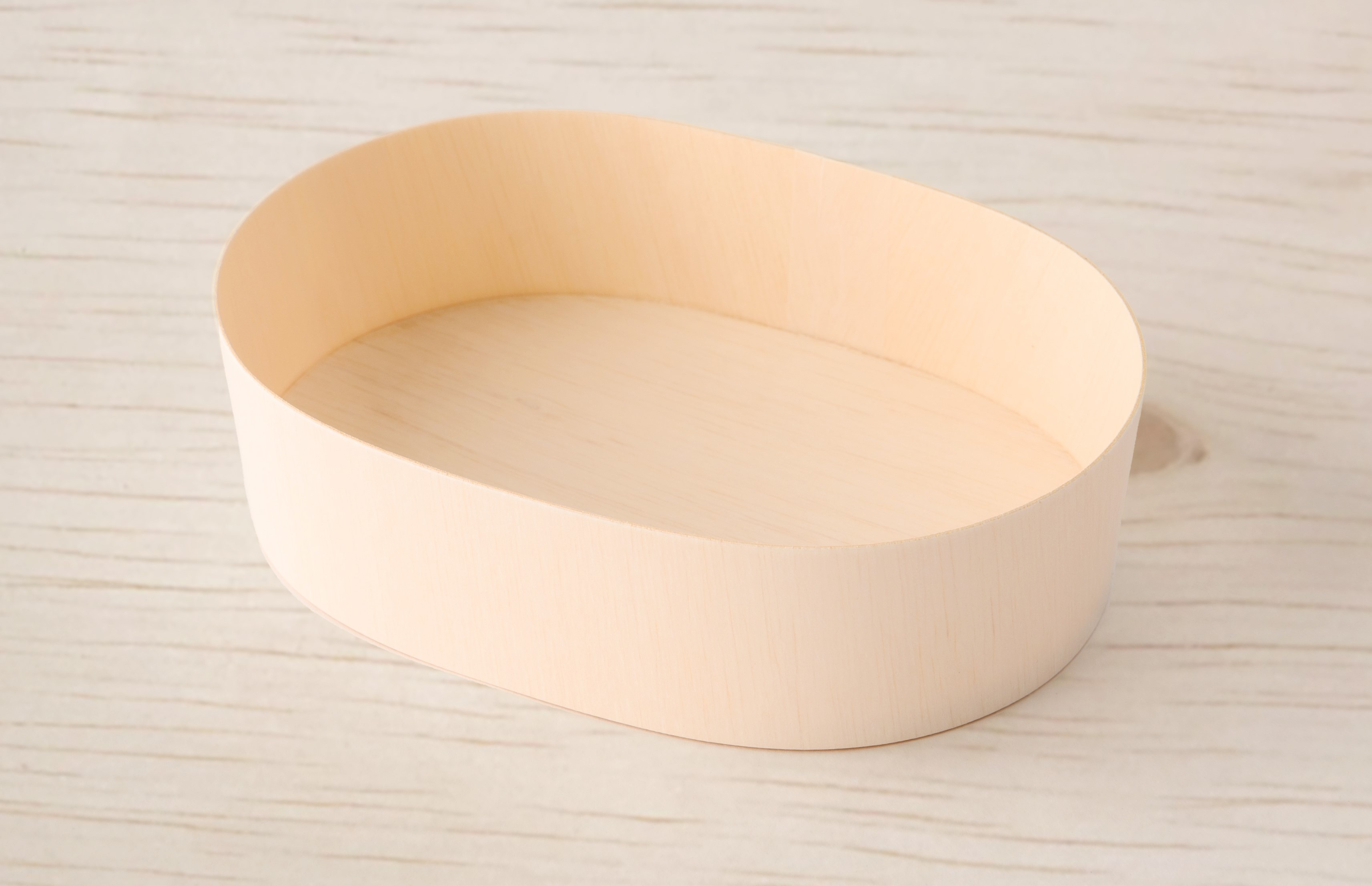
Japanese container made of Falcata

Falcataria is a genus of flowering plants in the family Fabaceae. It belongs to the monophyletic Mimosoid clade in the subfamily Caesalpinioideae. The genus has three species previously classified in the Falcataria section of the genus Paraserianthes by I.C. Neilsen. The distribution of these closely related species within the genus Falcataria links the wet tropics of north-east Australia to New Guinea, the Moluccas, Bismarck Archipelago, and the Solomon Islands east of Wallace's line similar to other plant taxa from the region.

== Species ==
- Falcataria falcata (formerly Falcataria moluccana) (Miq.) Barneby & J.W.Grimes (Native to New Guinea, Maluku Islands, the Solomon Islands, and the Bismarck Archipelago in Papua New Guinea)
- Falcataria pullenii (Verdc.) G.K. Brown, D.J. Murphy & P.Y. Ladiges (Native to Papua New Guinea)
- Falcataria toona (Bailey), G.K. Brown, D.J. Murphy & P.Y. Ladiges (Native to Australia)

== Taxonomy ==
Falcataria falcata had previously been classified within the genera Adenanthera, Albizia, and Paraserianthes before being moved to the new genus Falcataria, as the most widely distributed of the three species in the genus. This widely cultivated timber tree is still called by the common name "albizia" in Hawaii and elsewhere.

The two additional species in the genus Paraserianthes (P. pullenii and P. toona) were identified using morphology to form the Falcataria group with P. falcataria (=Falcataria moluccana) by I.C. Neilsen. A molecular phylogenetics study using genomic DNA and chloroplast DNA sequence data of these two species found them be closely related to Falcataria moluccana. These three species formed a well supported clade together that was distinctly different from Paraserianthes lophantha and so were moved to the genus Falcataria.

- Falcataria pullenii (Verdc.) G.K. Brown, D.J. Murphy & P.Y. Ladiges = Paraserianthes pullenii (Verdc.) I.C. Nielsen
- Falcataria toona (Bailey), G.K. Brown, D.J. Murphy & P.Y. Ladiges = Paraserianthes toona (F.M. Bailey) I.C. Nielsen
