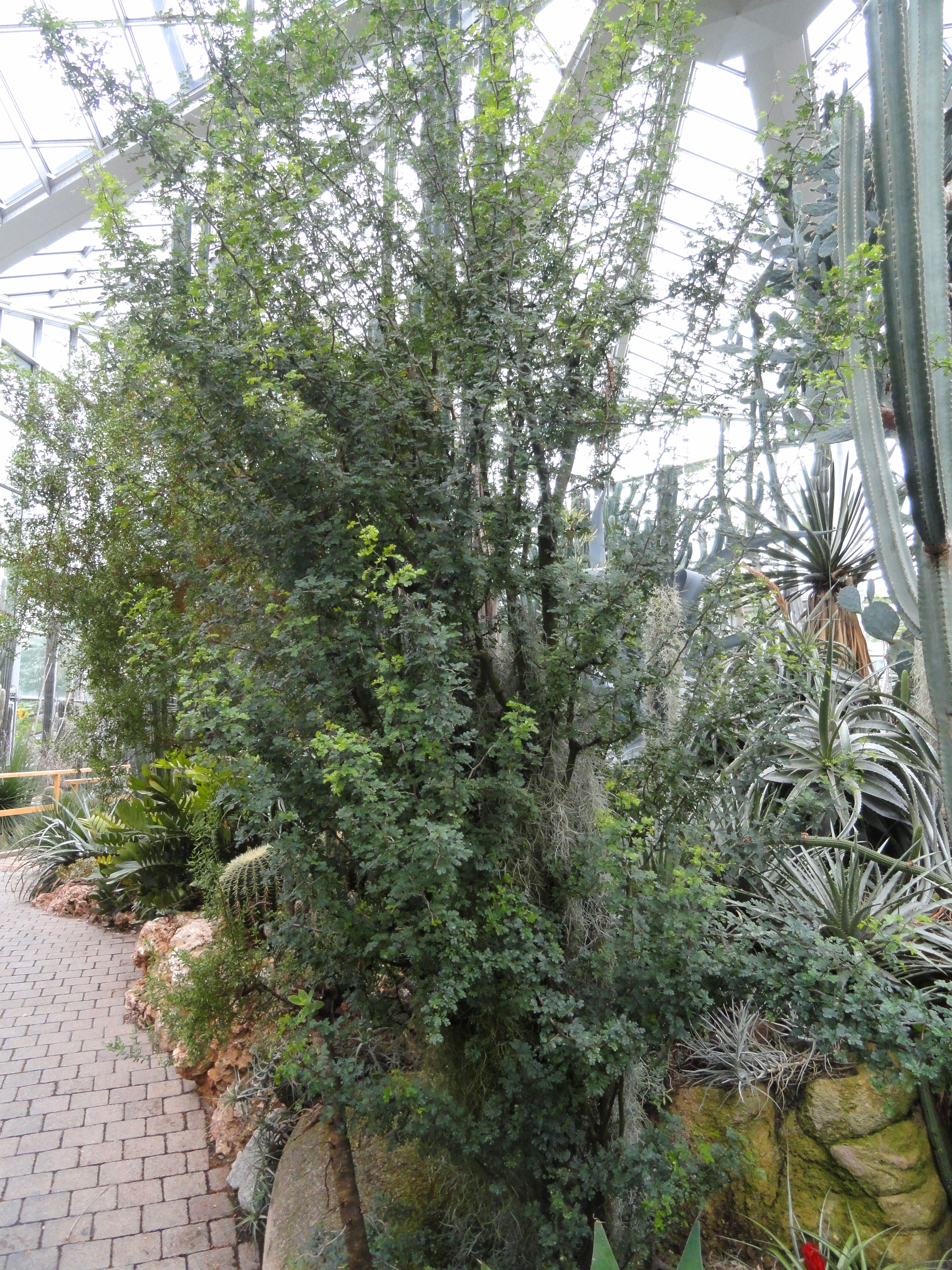
- Havardia mexicana

Scientific classification
- Kingdom: Plantae
- Clade: Tracheophytes
- Clade: Angiosperms
- Clade: Eudicots
- Clade: Rosids
- Order: Fabales
- Family: Fabaceae
- Subfamily: Caesalpinioideae
- Clade: Mimosoid clade
- Genus: Havardia; Small (1901)

Species
- five; see text

= Havardia =

Genus of legumes

Havardia is a genus of flowering plants in the family Fabaceae. It belongs to the mimosoid clade of the subfamily Caesalpinioideae. It includes five species of trees native to the Americas, ranging from Texas and northern Mexico through Central America to Colombia and Venezuela. Typical habitats include warm-temperate and tropical seasonally-dry woodland, wooded grassland, and desert thorn scrub, typically below 450 meters elevation.

== Species ==
Five species are accepted:

- Havardia acatlensis (Benth.) Britton & Rose – western and central Mexico
- Havardia albicans (Kunth) Britton & Rose – southern Mexico and Belize
- Havardia mexicana (Rose) Britton & Rose – northern Mexico
- Havardia pallens (Benth.) Britton & Rose – Huajillo – Mexico and Texas
- Havardia platyloba (Bertero ex DC.) Britton & Rose – southern Mexico to Colombia and Venezuela
