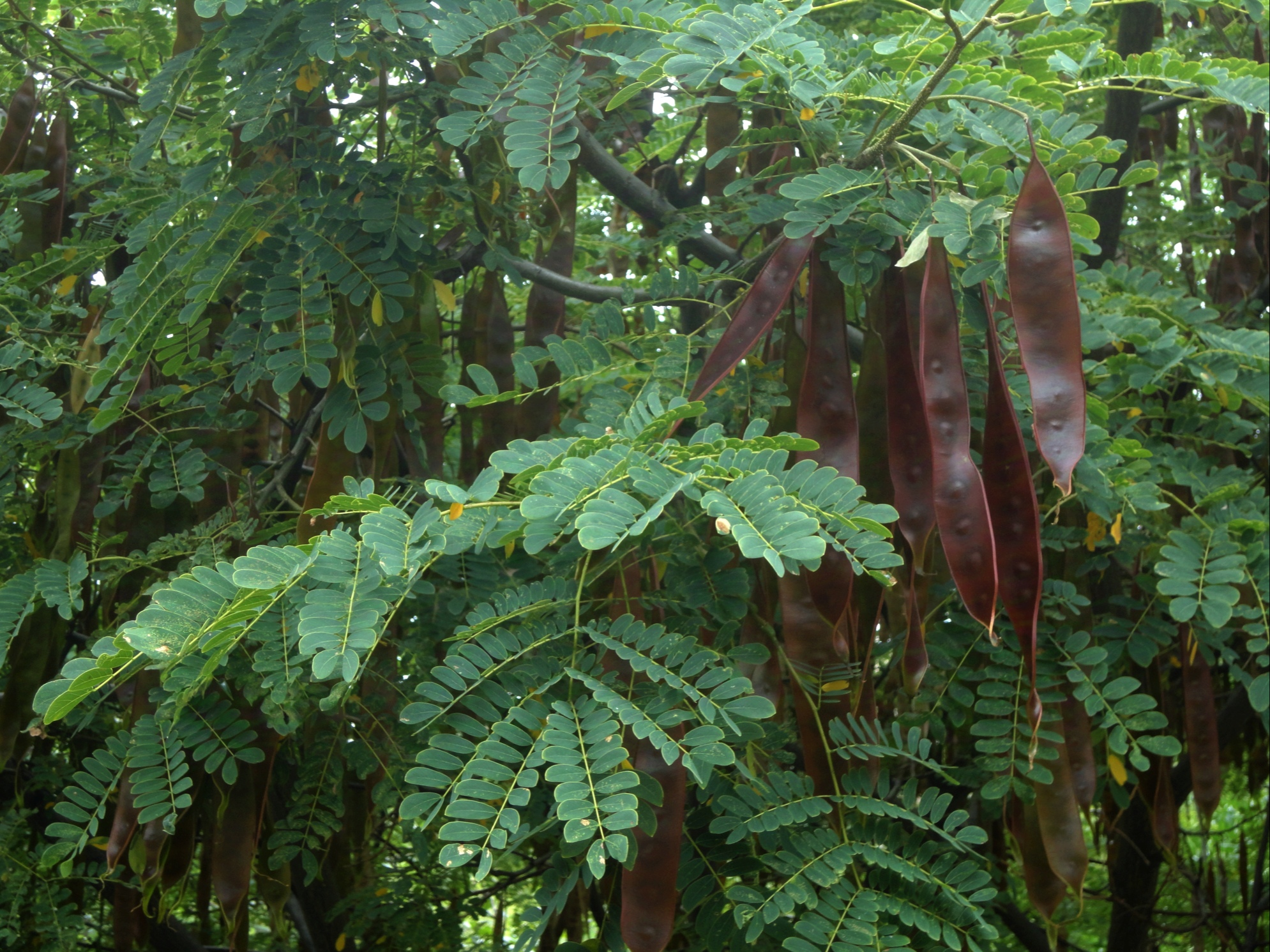

Scientific classification
- Kingdom: Plantae
- Clade: Tracheophytes
- Clade: Angiosperms
- Clade: Eudicots
- Clade: Rosids
- Order: Fabales
- Family: Fabaceae
- Subfamily: Caesalpinioideae
- Clade: Mimosoid clade
- Genus: Hesperalbizia; Barneby & J.W.Grimes
- Species: H. occidentalis

Binomial name
- Hesperalbizia occidentalis (Brandegee) Barneby & J.W.Grimes

Synonyms
- Albizia obliqua Britton & Rose; Albizia occidentalis Brandegee; Albizia occidentalis var. plurijuga (Standl.) L.Rico & S.L.Gale; Albizia plurijuga (Standl.) Britton & Rose; Leucaena plurijuga Standl.

= Hesperalbizia =

Genus of legumes

Hesperalbizia is a genus of flowering plants in the family Fabaceae. It belongs to the mimosoid clade of the subfamily Caesalpinioideae. The only species is Hesperalbizia occidentalis. It is native to Mexico and is known by the common name palo escopeta.
