= Cathormion =

Scientific classification
- Kingdom: Plantae
- Clade: Tracheophytes
- Clade: Angiosperms
- Clade: Eudicots
- Clade: Rosids
- Order: Fabales
- Family: Fabaceae
- Subfamily: Caesalpinioideae
- Clade: Mimosoid clade
- Genus: Cathormion (Benth.) Hassk. (1855)
- Species: C. umbellatum

Binomial name
- Cathormion umbellatum (Vahl) Kosterm. (1954)

Subspecies
- Cathormion umbellatum subsp. moniliforme (DC.) Brummitt; Cathormion umbellatum subsp. umbellatum

Synonyms
- Feuilleea umbellata (Vahl) Kuntze (1891); Inga umbellata (Vahl) Willd. (1806); Mimosa umbellata Vahl (1791); Pithecellobium umbellatum (Vahl) Benth. (1844)

Genus of flowering plants

Cathormion is a genus of flowering plants in the family Fabaceae. It contains a single species, Cathormion umbellatum, a shrub or tree which ranges from India to Indochina, Sumatra, Java, Sulawesi, the Lesser Sunda Islands, Maluku, New Guinea, and northern Australia.

It belongs to the mimosoid clade of the subfamily Caesalpinioideae.

Two subspecies are accepted:

- Cathormion umbellatum subsp. moniliforme (DC.) Brummitt – Thailand, Sumatra, Java, Maluku, Lesser Sunda Islands, New Guinea, and northern Australia
- Cathormion umbellatum subsp. umbellatum – India, Thailand, Cambodia, Laos, and Vietnam
