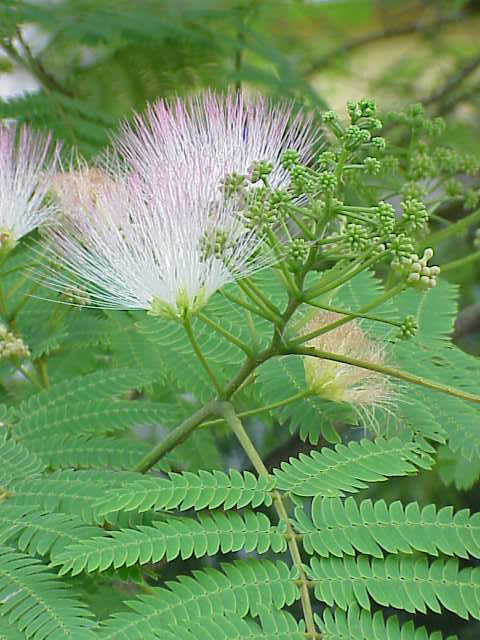
- Persian silk tree (Albizia julibrissin), foliage and blossoms

Scientific classification
- Kingdom: Plantae
- Clade: Embryophytes
- Clade: Tracheophytes
- Clade: Angiosperms
- Clade: Eudicots
- Clade: Rosids
- Order: Fabales
- Family: Fabaceae
- Subfamily: Caesalpinioideae
- Clade: Mimosoid clade
- Genus: Albizia; Durazz. (1772)

Diversity
- About 150 species

Synonyms
- Albizzia Benth.; Arthrosprion Hassk. (1855); Besenna A. Rich. (1848); Parasamanea Kosterm. (1954); Parenterolobium Kosterm. (1954); Sassa Bruce ex J. F. Gmel. (1792); Serialbizzia Kosterm. (1954); Sericandra Raf. (1838)

= Albizia =

Genus of flowering plants in the legume family

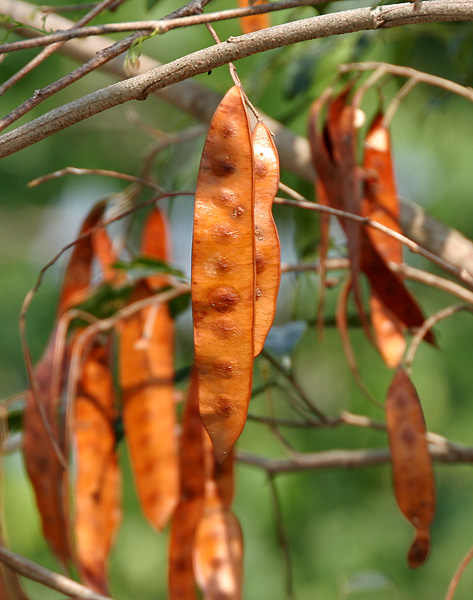
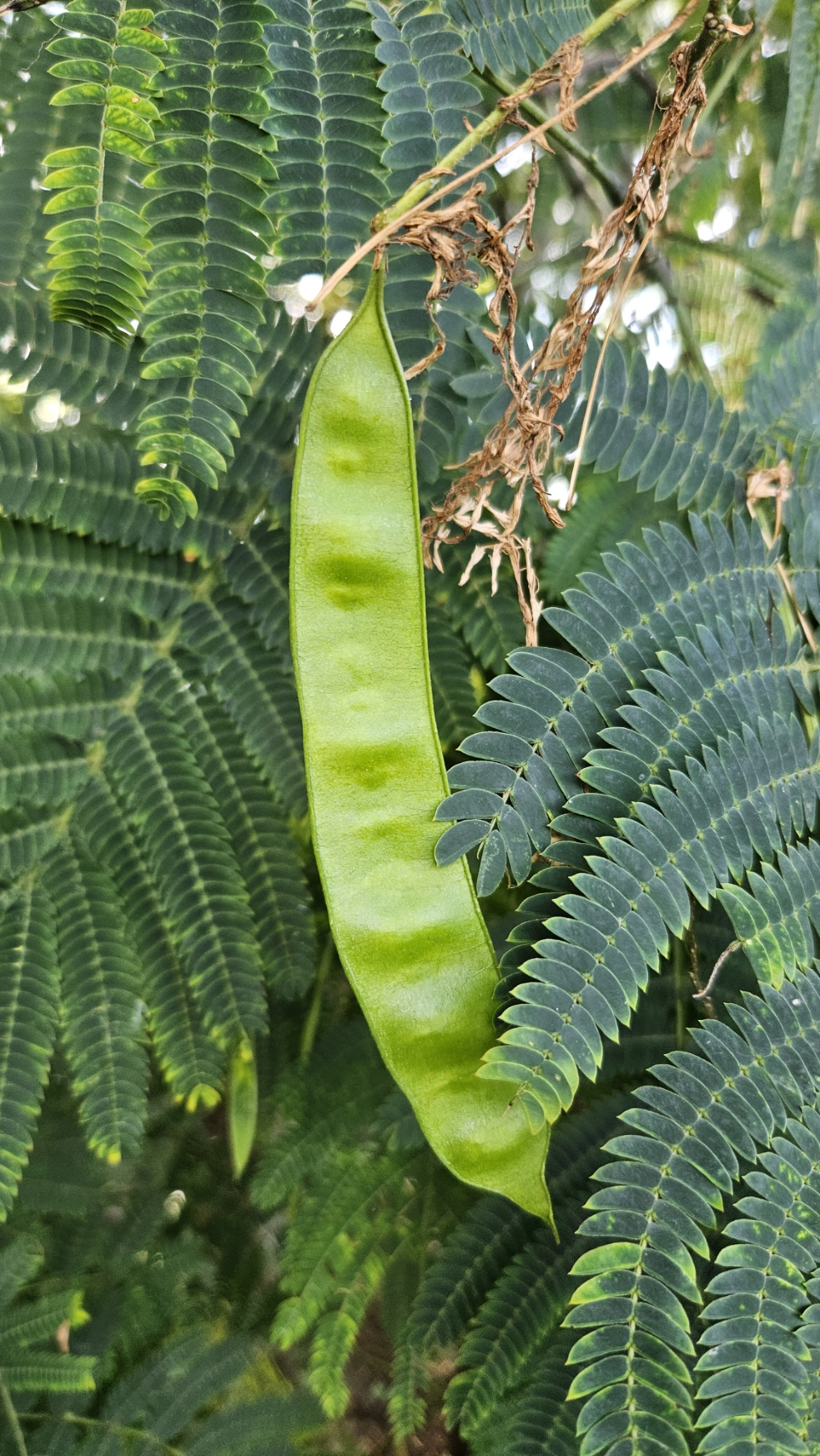
Albizia procera fruits

Albizia is a genus of more than 160 species of mostly fast-growing subtropical and tropical trees and shrubs in the subfamily Mimosoideae of the family Fabaceae. The genus is pantropical, occurring in Asia, Africa, Madagascar, America and Australia, but mostly in the Old World tropics. In some locations, some species are considered weeds.

They are commonly called silk plants, silk trees, or sirises. The obsolete spelling of the generic name – with double 'z' – is still common, so the plants may be called albizzias. The generic name honors the Italian nobleman Filippo degli Albizzi, who introduced Albizia julibrissin to Europe in the mid-18th century. Some species are commonly called mimosa, which more accurately refers to plants of genus Mimosa. Species from southeast Asia used for timber are sometime termed East Indian walnut.

== Description ==
They are usually small trees or shrubs with a short lifespan, though the famous Samán del Guère near Maracay in Venezuela is a huge Albizia saman specimen several hundred years old. The leaves are pinnately or bipinnately compound. The small flowers are in bundles, with stamens much longer than the petals. The stamens are usually showy, although in some species such as A. canescens the flowers are inconspicuous.

Unlike those of Mimosa, Albizia flowers have many more than 10 stamens. Albizia can also be told apart from another large related genus, Acacia, by its stamens, which are joined at the bases instead of separate.

== Taxonomy ==
Numerous species placed in Albizia by early authors were eventually moved to other genera, most notably Archidendron. Other genera of Ingeae (Abarema, Archidendropsis, Blanchetiodendron, Calliandra, Cathormion, Enterolobium, Havardia, Hesperalbizia, Hydrochorea, Pararchidendron, Paraserianthes, Pseudosamanea and Serianthes) have also received their share of former Albizia species, as have the Mimoseae Newtonia and Schleinitzia. Some presumed "silk trees" are in fact misidentified members of the not very closely related genus Erythrophleum from the Caesalpinioideae and Lebeckia from the Faboideae.

The delimitation of Falcataria and Pithecellobium, close relatives of Albizia, is notoriously complex, with species having been moved between the genera time and again, and this will likely continue. These include Falcataria falcata (the Moluccan albizia, formerly named Albizia moluccana), a common shade tree on tea plantations. Other closely related genera like Chloroleucon and Samanea are often merged with Albizia entirely.

== Uses ==
Albizias are important forage, timber, and medicinal plants, and many are cultivated as ornamentals for their attractive flowers – notably Albizia julibrissin.

Some species are used as food plants by the larvae of moths in the genus Endoclita, including E. damor, E. malabaricus, and E. sericeus.

== See also ==
- List of Albizia species
