= Dominican tea culture =

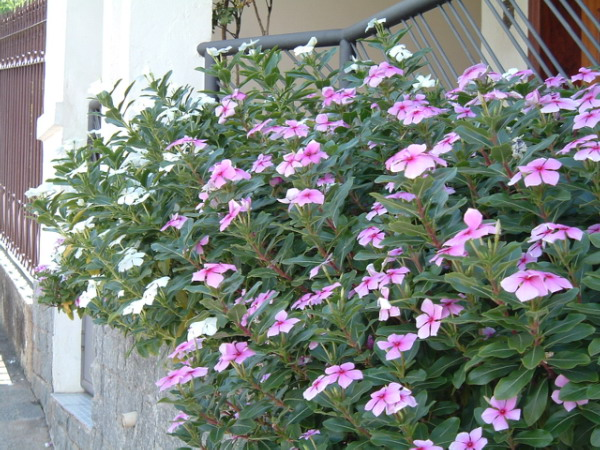
Periwinkle plants in bloom. Indigenous Caribs made medicinal tea from Periwinkle (Catharanthus roseus), and it is used today in modern pharmacology.

Dominican tea culture combines many customs adapted from various colonial and immigrant cultures that have mingled in Dominica. "Bush teas", made from local herbal plants and often taken for medicinal purposes, are a traditional part of Dominica's culture.

== Tea terms in Dominican culture ==
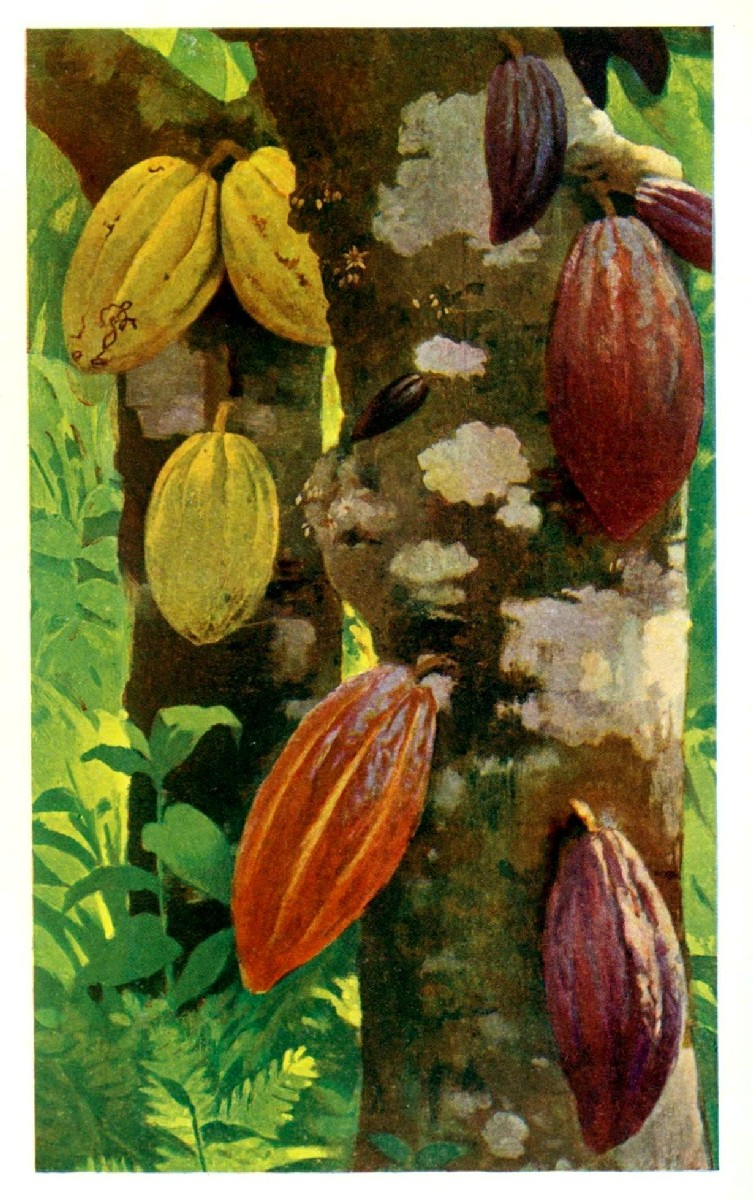
Cocoa plants, commonly cultivated in Dominica, and used to make cocoa tea.

Dominica's tropical rainforest climate makes it suitable for cultivating many types of plant that may be used to make teas. The word "tea" has a broader meaning in Dominica than in most other parts of the English-speaking world. In Dominica, the word is used for many beverages other than the traditional Camellia sinensis imported from Asia. Imported tea from Asia is called "green tea". Dominicans also consume "Cocoa Tea", made of cocoa beans, and several types of "bush tea". Bush teas are brewed from herbs, in some cases using plant roots, bark or flowers, which are traditionally held to have medicinal properties. Dominicans also distinguish between "hot teas" and "cooling teas".

"Tea" is often used instead of "breakfast" for the first meal of the day. This usage has its origins in the colonial era, when plantation workers would have "tea" at sunrise before going to work. The second "tea" of the day took place in mid-morning. This is different from British culture, where "tea" often refers to a light meal with a cup of Assam tea in the late afternoon.

== Cocoa tea ==
Cocoa is a staple crop in Dominica that most farmers traditionally harvested, and that is common in Caribbean markets. Cocoa tea is made by chopping a cocoa stick or ball into small pieces, or shredding the cocoa on a grater. It is mixed with water, condensed milk, cinnamon, leaves from a Christmas bush or bay leaves, grated nutmeg and sugar. Cocoa tea is served hot, often accompanied by a light snack such as banana fritters. Cocoa tea is similar to hot chocolate.

== Hibiscus tea ==
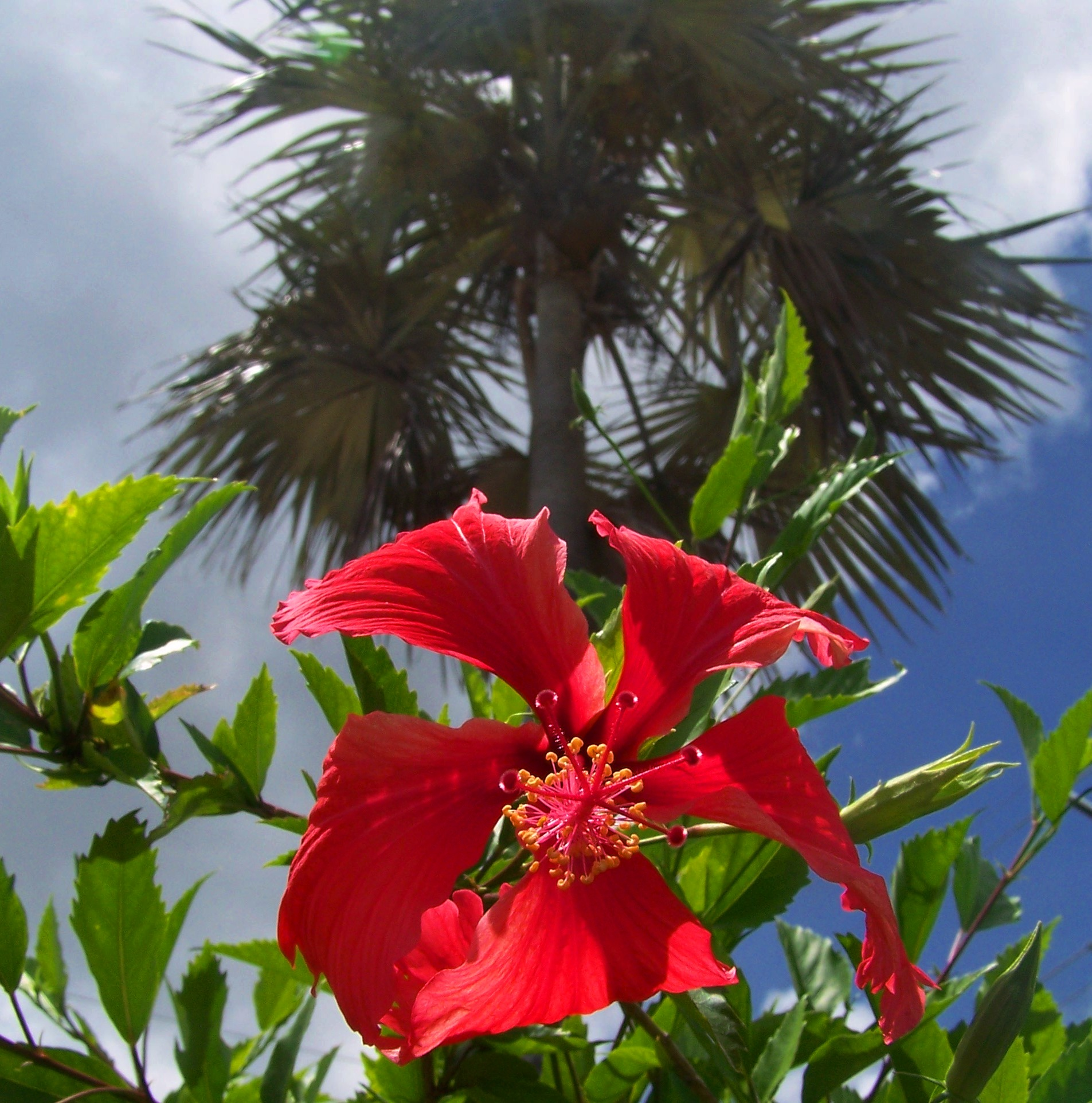
Hibiscus flowers are common in Dominica and other Caribbean islands, and make a hibiscus tea popular throughout the region.

Hibiscus tea is popular in Dominica, as in other Caribbean and Latin American cultures. Hibiscus plants are native to the tropics, and have long been associated with health benefits in traditional medicine. Hibiscus tea may be served either hot or as an iced tea. Some studies indicate that hibiscus tea lowers blood pressure in adults with mild hypertension or prehypertension.

== Medicinal teas ==
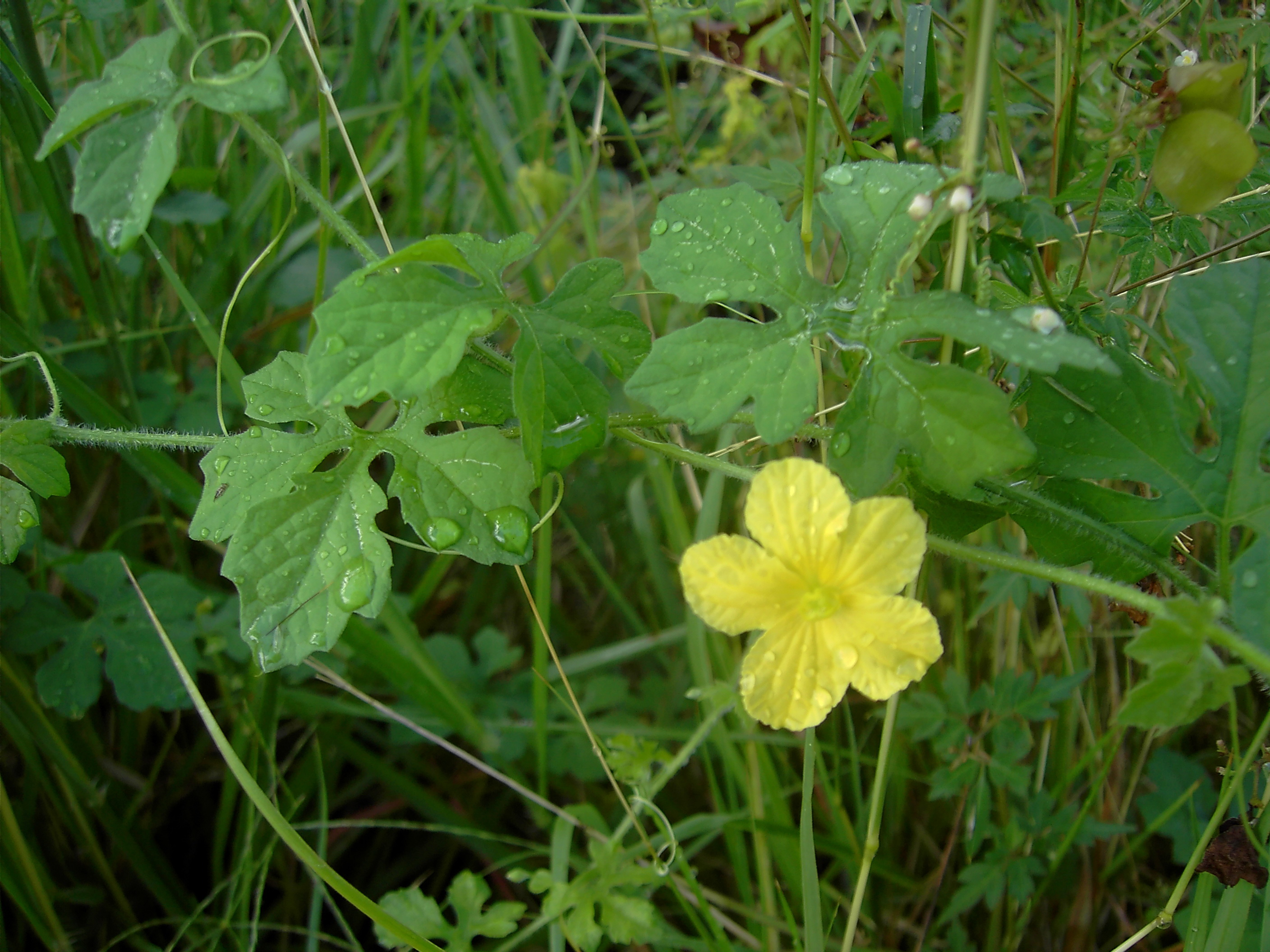
A bitter melon plant growing near Woodfordhill, Dominica. Bitter melon is one of many plants cultivated in Dominica to make teas with traditional medicinal uses.

Bush teas are usually drunk for medicinal purposes or to maintain health. Many common plants in Dominica are used in these teas. Tea from the Common Guava leaf is used for diarrhea, and tea from the orange leaf is taken to stop vomiting. Caribbean Albizia bark (Albizia niopoides) gives a tea that soothes scorpion stings. Other bush teas are used to treat vitamin deficiencies, digestive ailments, or parasitic infections. Some plants believed to have medicinal properties are located at the Dominica Botanic Gardens. These include varieties that have been used in traditional medicinal teas in Dominica, and plants used in traditional medicine in other Caribbean islands or other parts of the world.

Medicinal teas in Dominica can be traced to the original indigenous Carib inhabitants and to the African slaves who were brought to the islands. The Caribs traditionally made a tea from the leaves of the periwinkle plant (Catharanthus roseus) for use as a treatment for diabetes. Pharmacological companies today extract several medicinal alkaloids from periwinkle sap. The alkaloids derived from this plant include the anti-cancer agents vinblastine and vincristine. Other extracts from periwinkle help lower blood sugar in diabetics and are the basis for powerful tranquilizers. The powerful qualities of this plant were known to other cultures; it is known by the name Violette de Sorcier (Sorcerer's Violet) in France.

As with many indigenous traditional medicines, the active ingredients of the plants used to make bush teas are not well understood. At incorrect doses, or otherwise misused, teas made from these plants are toxic and may be deadly. Worldwide, researchers are investigating indigenous herbal medicines in an effort to identify active ingredients and traditional preparations, which may have uses for modern medicine.

== See also ==
- Dominica cuisine
- Tea
- Herbal tea
- Traditional medicine
