= Timbo =

Timbo may refer to:

- Timbó, a municipality in Brazil
- Timbo, Arkansas, a town in the United States
- Timbo, Guinea, a town in Guinea
- Timbo blanco or Pseudalbizzia inundata, a tropical tree with light wood
- Timbo King (born 1973)

== See also ==
- The Timberland Company, footwear manufacturer
- Timbaland (born 1972), American rapper and record producer
