= Dominican food =

Dominican food may refer to:

- Dominica cuisine, often eaten in the country Dominica
- Dominican Republic cuisine, often eaten in the Dominican Republic
