= Dominican cuisine =

Dominican cuisine may refer to:

- Dominica cuisine, often eaten in the country Dominica
- Dominican Republic cuisine, often eaten in the Dominican Republic
