= Pseudalbizzia glabripetala =

Conservation status
- Least Concern (IUCN 3.1)

Scientific classification
- Kingdom: Plantae
- Clade: Tracheophytes
- Clade: Angiosperms
- Clade: Eudicots
- Clade: Rosids
- Order: Fabales
- Family: Fabaceae
- Genus: Pseudalbizzia
- Species: P. glabripetala

Binomial name
- Pseudalbizzia glabripetala (H.S.Irwin) E.J.M.Koenen & Duno (2022)

Synonyms
- Albizia glabripetala (H.S.Irwin) G.J.Lewis & P.E.Owen (1989); Pithecellobium glabripetalum H.S.Irwin (1966)

Species of legume

Pseudalbizzia glabripetala is a species of flowering plant in the family Fabaceae. It is a tree native to Guyana, Venezuela, and Roraima state of northern Brazil.
