= Pseudalbizzia decandra =

Conservation status
- Least Concern (IUCN 2.3)

Scientific classification
- Kingdom: Plantae
- Clade: Tracheophytes
- Clade: Angiosperms
- Clade: Eudicots
- Clade: Rosids
- Order: Fabales
- Family: Fabaceae
- Genus: Pseudalbizzia
- Species: P. decandra

Binomial name
- Pseudalbizzia decandra (Ducke) E.J.M.Koenen & Duno (2022)

Synonyms
- Albizia decandra (Ducke) Barneby & J.W.Grimes (1996); Pithecellobium decandrum Ducke (1930)

Species of legume

Pseudalbizzia decandra (syns. Albizia decandra and Pithecellobium decandrum) is a species of flowering plant in the legume family, Fabaceae. It is endemic to Brazil, where it occurs in the forests of the Amazon River valley and along its tributaries.
