= Pseudalbizzia burkartiana =

Conservation status
- Endangered (IUCN 3.1)

Scientific classification
- Kingdom: Plantae
- Clade: Tracheophytes
- Clade: Angiosperms
- Clade: Eudicots
- Clade: Rosids
- Order: Fabales
- Family: Fabaceae
- Genus: Pseudalbizzia
- Species: P. burkartiana

Binomial name
- Pseudalbizzia burkartiana (Barneby & J.W.Grimes) E.J.M.Koenen & Duno (2022)

Synonyms
- Albizia burkartiana Barneby & J.W.Grimes (1996)

Species of legume

Pseudalbizzia burkartiana is a species of tree in the family Fabaceae.

== Distribution ==
The tree is endemic to southwestern Brazil.

It is only found in southwestern Paraná state and western Santa Catarina state, in the basin of the Iguazu River and Uruguay River.
