= Pseudalbizzia berteroana =

Conservation status
- Vulnerable (IUCN 2.3)

Scientific classification
- Kingdom: Plantae
- Clade: Tracheophytes
- Clade: Angiosperms
- Clade: Eudicots
- Clade: Rosids
- Order: Fabales
- Family: Fabaceae
- Genus: Pseudalbizzia
- Species: P. berteroana

Binomial name
- Pseudalbizzia berteroana (Balb. ex DC.) Britton & Rose (1928)

Synonyms
- Acacia balbisii Spreng. (1826); Acacia berteroana Balb. ex DC. (1825); Acacia berteroana Spreng. (1826), nom. illeg.; Acacia littoralis A.Rich. (1845); Acacia sprengelii G.Don (1832); Albizia berteroana (Balb. ex DC.) Fawc. & Rendle (1920); Cathormion berteroanum (Balb. ex DC.) Burkart (1964); Feuilleea berteroana (Balb. ex DC.) Kuntze (1891); Inga fragrans Macfad. (1837); Pithecellobium berteroanum (Balb. ex DC.) Benth. (1844); Pithecellobium fragrans (Macfad.) Benth. (1844)

Species of legume

Pseudalbizzia berteroana, the Bertero albizia, is a species of plant in the family Fabaceae. It is found in Cuba, the Dominican Republic, Haiti, Jamaica, and Panama.
