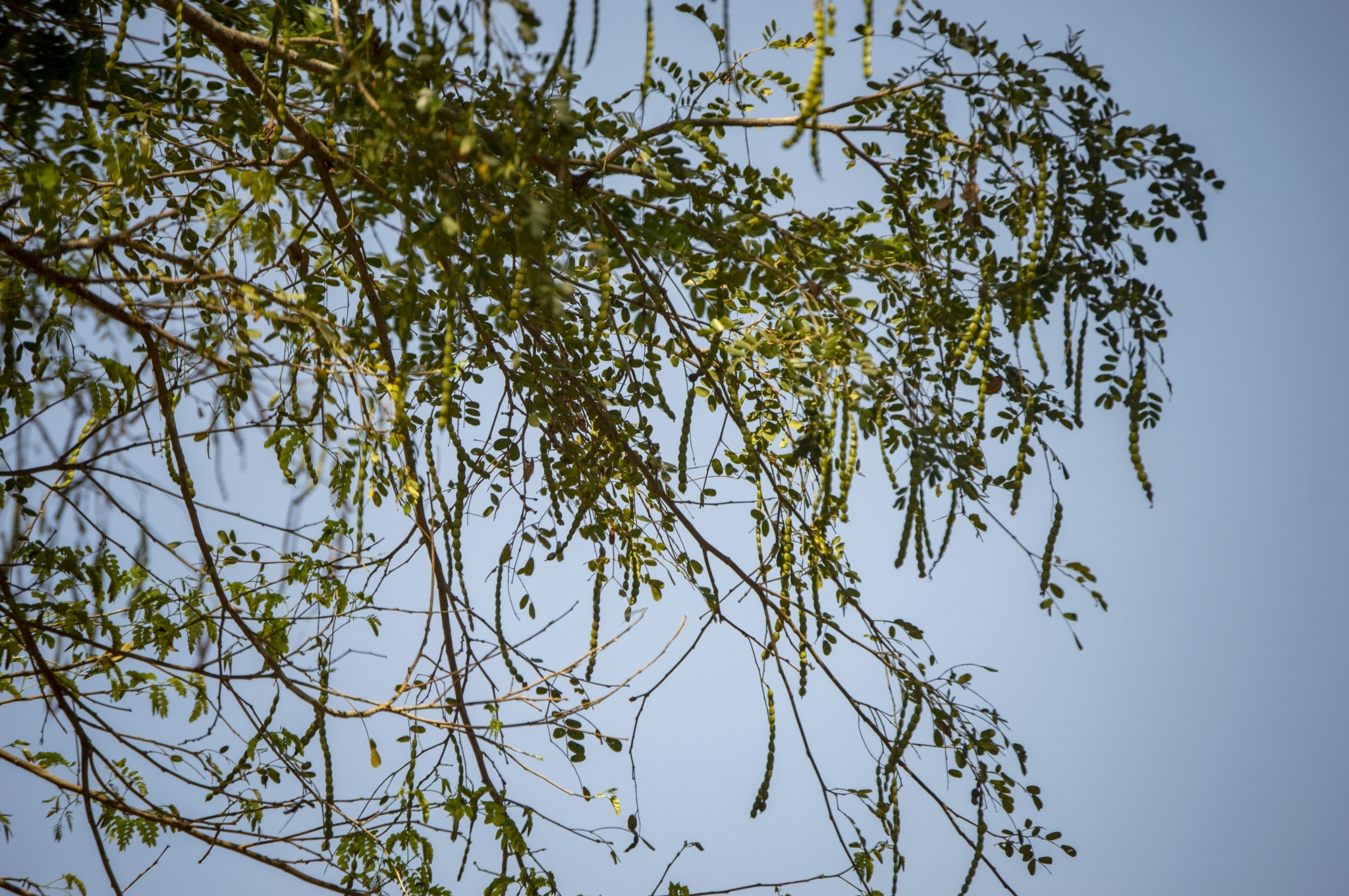

Conservation status
- Least Concern (IUCN 2.3)

Scientific classification
- Kingdom: Plantae
- Clade: Tracheophytes
- Clade: Angiosperms
- Clade: Eudicots
- Clade: Rosids
- Order: Fabales
- Family: Fabaceae
- Genus: Pseudalbizzia
- Species: P. pistaciifolia

Binomial name
- Pseudalbizzia pistaciifolia (Willd.) E.J.M.Koenen & Duno (2022)

Synonyms
- List: Albizia pistaciifolia (Willd.) Barneby & J.W.Grimes (1996); Arthrosamanea daulensis (Spruce ex Benth.) Killip (1940); Arthrosamanea pistaciifolia (Willd.) Britton & Rose (1936); Cathormion daulense (Spruce ex Benth.) Burkart (1964); Cathormion pistaciifolium (Willd.) Burkart (1964); Feuilleea daulensis (Spruce ex Benth.) Kuntze (1891); Feuilleea triflora (G.Don) Kuntze (1891); Inga pistaciifolia Spreng. (1826); Inga triflora G.Don (1832); Mimosa cascabelillo Colla (1824); Mimosa pistaciifolia Willd. (1806); Mimosa triflora Pav. ex Benth. (1875), not validly publ.; Pithecellobium daulense Spruce ex Benth. (1875); Pithecellobium triflorum (G.Don) Benth. (1875); Samanea guajacifolia Pittier (1925); Samanea pistaciifolia (Willd.) Dugand (1933)

= Pseudalbizzia pistaciifolia =

Species of legume

Pseudalbizzia pistaciifolia is a species of plant in the family Fabaceae. It is found in Colombia, Ecuador, and Venezuela.
