= Pseudalbizzia buntingii =

Conservation status
- Critically Endangered (IUCN 3.1)

Scientific classification
- Kingdom: Plantae
- Clade: Tracheophytes
- Clade: Angiosperms
- Clade: Eudicots
- Clade: Rosids
- Order: Fabales
- Family: Fabaceae
- Genus: Pseudalbizzia
- Species: P. buntingii

Binomial name
- Pseudalbizzia buntingii (Barneby & J.W.Grimes) E.J.M.Koenen & Duno (2022)

Synonyms
- Albizia buntingii Barneby & J.W.Grimes (1996)

Species of legume

Pseudalbizzia buntingii is a species of plant in the family Fabaceae. It a tree found only in Zulia state of Venezuela.
