= Pseudalbizzia =

Scientific classification
- Kingdom: Plantae
- Clade: Tracheophytes
- Clade: Angiosperms
- Clade: Eudicots
- Clade: Rosids
- Order: Fabales
- Family: Fabaceae
- Genus: Pseudalbizzia; Britton & Rose (1928)

Synonyms
- Arthrosamanea Britton & Rose (1936)

Genus of flowering plants

Pseudalbizzia is a genus of flowering plants in the pea family (Fabaceae). It includes 17 species which are native to the tropical Americas, from Mexico to northern Argentina.

== Species ==
17 species are accepted:

- Pseudalbizzia adinocephala (Donn.Sm.) E.J.M.Koenen & Duno – southern Mexico to Panama
- Pseudalbizzia barinensis (L.Cárdenas) E.J.M.Koenen & Duno – Venezuela and southwestern Guyana
- Pseudalbizzia berteroana (Balb. ex DC.) Britton & Rose – eastern Cuba, Hispaniola, Jamaica, and Panama
- Pseudalbizzia buntingii (Barneby & J.W.Grimes) E.J.M.Koenen & Duno – Venezuela
- Pseudalbizzia burkartiana (Barneby & J.W.Grimes) E.J.M.Koenen & Duno – southern Brazil
- Pseudalbizzia coripatensis (Rusby) E.J.M.Koenen & Duno – Bolivia
- Pseudalbizzia decandra (Ducke) E.J.M.Koenen & Duno – northern and western Brazil
- Pseudalbizzia edwallii (Hoehne) E.J.M.Koenen & Duno – southeastern and southern Brazil and northeastern Argentina
- Pseudalbizzia glabripetala (H.S.Irwin) E.J.M.Koenen & Duno – Venezuela, southern Guyana, and northern Brazil (Roraima)
- Pseudalbizzia inundata (Mart.) E.J.M.Koenen & Duno – Brazil, Bolivia, Paraguay, Uruguay, and northern Argentina
- Pseudalbizzia multiflora (Kunth) E.J.M.Koenen & Duno – central and eastern Panama, Colombia, Ecuador, and Peru
- Pseudalbizzia niopoides (Spruce ex Benth.) E.J.M.Koenen & Duno – southern Mexico to northeastern Argentina
- Pseudalbizzia pistaciifolia (Willd.) E.J.M.Koenen & Duno – Venezuela, Colombia, and Ecuador
- Pseudalbizzia polycephala (Benth.) E.J.M.Koenen & Duno – Peru and eastern, southern, and west-central Brazil
- Pseudalbizzia sinaloensis (Britton & Rose) E.J.M.Koenen & Duno – northern and southwestern Mexico
- Pseudalbizzia subdimidiata (Splitg.) E.J.M.Koenen & Duno – northern south America to Bolivia
- Pseudalbizzia tomentosa (Micheli) E.J.M.Koenen & Duno – Mexico and Guatemala
