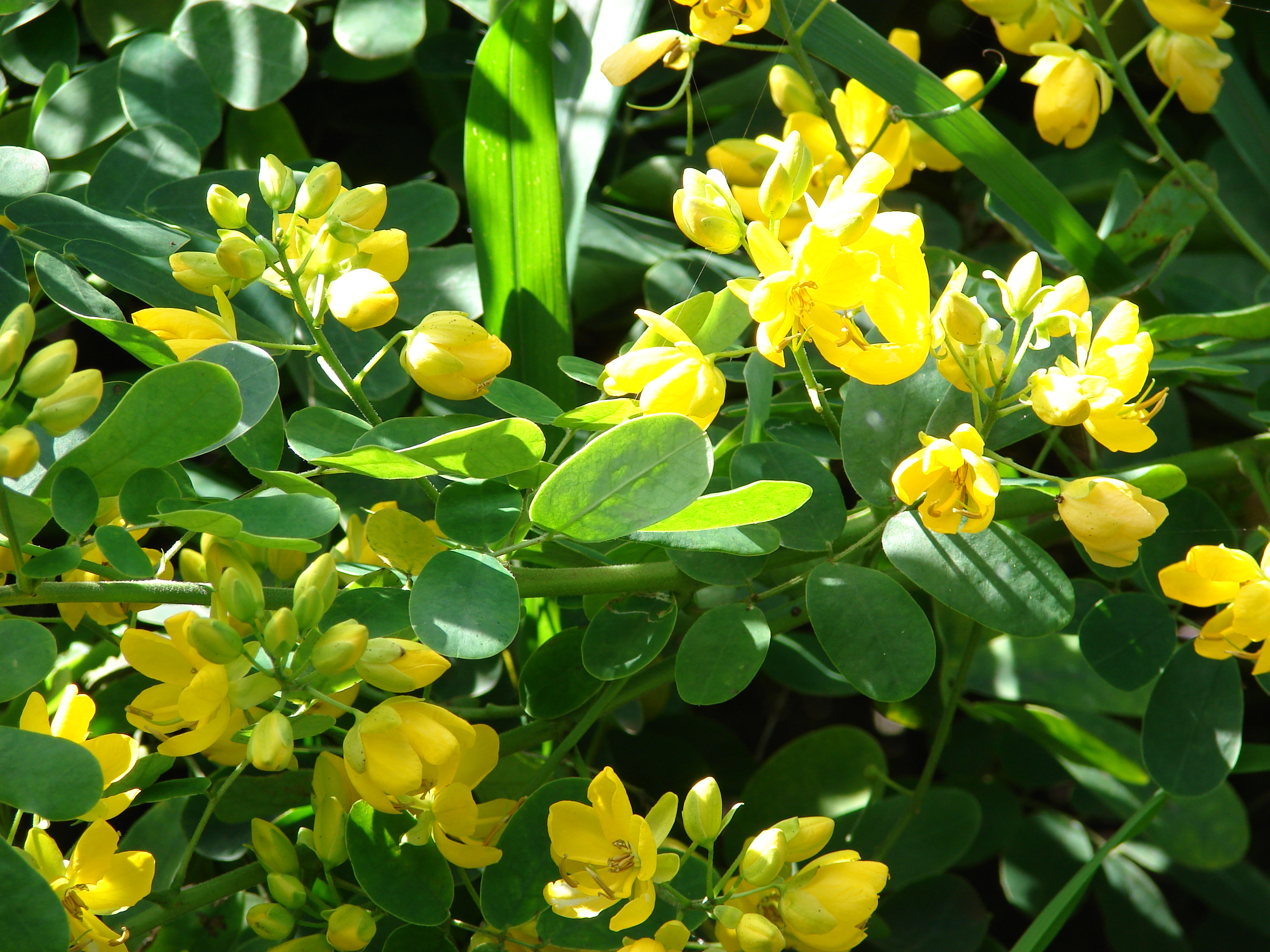

Scientific classification
- Kingdom: Plantae
- Clade: Tracheophytes
- Clade: Angiosperms
- Clade: Eudicots
- Clade: Rosids
- Order: Fabales
- Family: Fabaceae
- Subfamily: Caesalpinioideae
- Genus: Senna
- Species: S. pendula

Binomial name
- Senna pendula (Humb. & Bonpl. ex Willd.) H.S.Irwin & Barneby

Varieties
- 17; see text

Synonyms
- Cassia indecora var. pendula (Humb. & Bonpl. ex Willd.) Vogel; Cassia pendula Humb. & Bonpl. ex Willd.; Chamaefistula pendula (Humb. & Bonpl. ex Willd.) G.Don

= Senna pendula =

Species of legume

Senna pendula, also known as Easter Cassia, Christmas Senna, (Note: Known as such in the southern hemisphere due its minor flowering season around Christmastime, although this name is also applied to Senna bicapsularis.) winter Senna, (Note: Known as such in the northern hemisphere due to its flowering in early wintertime.) climbing Cassia, golden shower, pendant Senna and valamuerto, is a plant of the Fabaceae family with a shrub habit that is native to South America. It used in various parts of the world as an ornamental plant and is an environmental weed in Australia. The flowers are yellow and the name pendula means 'pendulous' or 'drooping'.

== Description ==
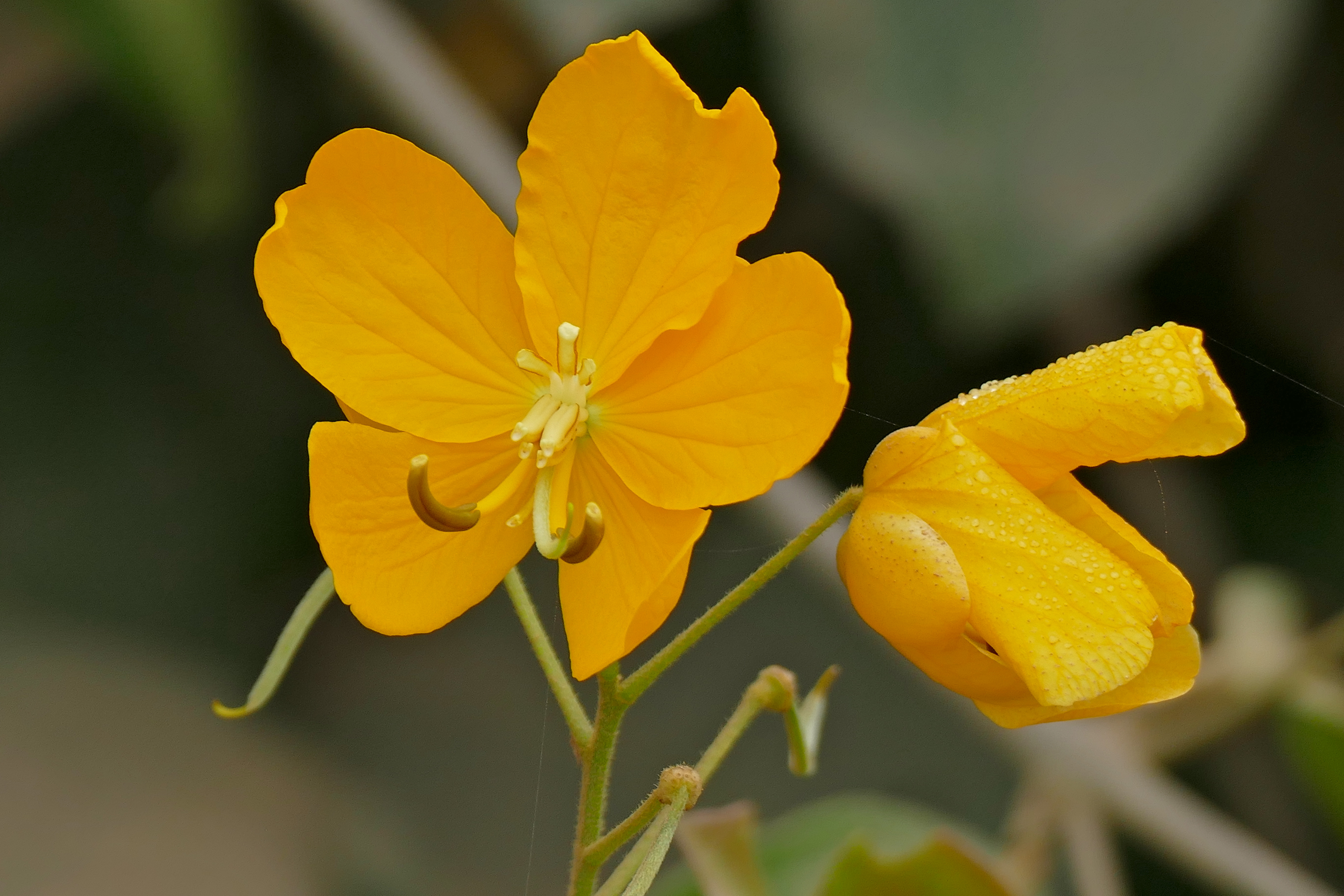
Flower close-up

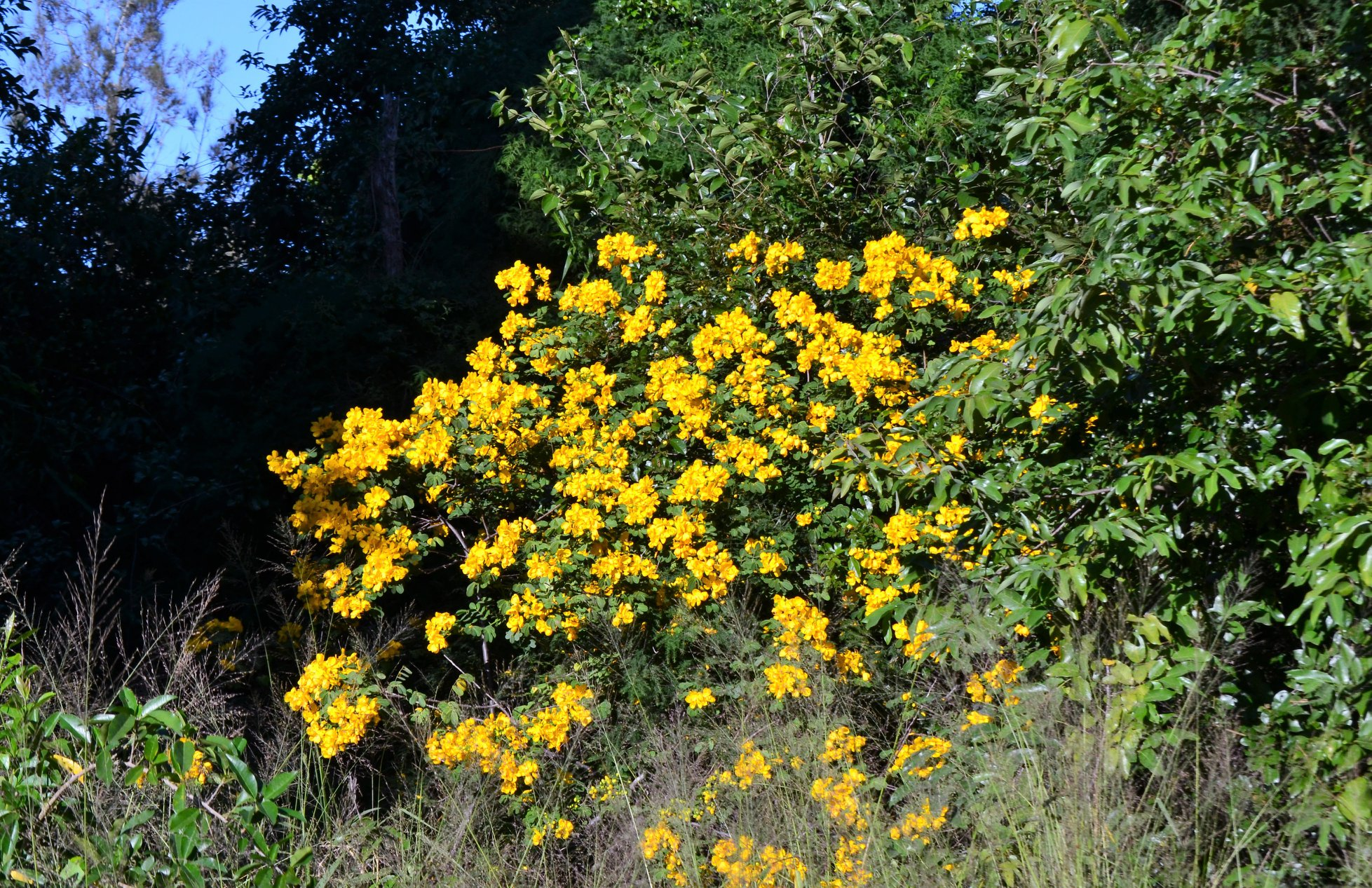
Shrubland naturalisation

It is a fast-growing, spreading, scrambling or erect shrub that reaches 2–4 metres in height with multi-branched and arching stems and branches. Its single-compound, hairless leaves feature three to six duos of wide leaflets that are 1–5 cm long and 5–20 mm wide with rounded tips and salient yellowish margins.

Senna pendula is distinguished from Senna bicapsularis which has 3 pairs of leaflets on each leaf, while this one has 4–7 pairs of leaflets on each leaf and a gland between each pair of leaflets. S. bicapsularis has flowers borne on rather short pedicels (flower stalks) that are less than half a centimeter in length, whereas S. pendula has flowers borne on longer (1 to 3 cm) pedicels. S. pendula may flower from as early as late summer, whereas S. bicapsularis blooms from late autumn to winter.

=== Inflorescences ===
Its bright yellow flowers, which are about 3 cm across, have five large petals and are foaled in leafy clumps at the tips of the branches. The fruit is in a cylindrical pod (10–20 cm long and 6–12 mm wide) that hangs down. It flowers prominently at Easter in the southern hemisphere (or early autumn), hence its common name. It also has an insignificant flowering season in early summer (around Christmas in the southern hemisphere).

== Varieties ==
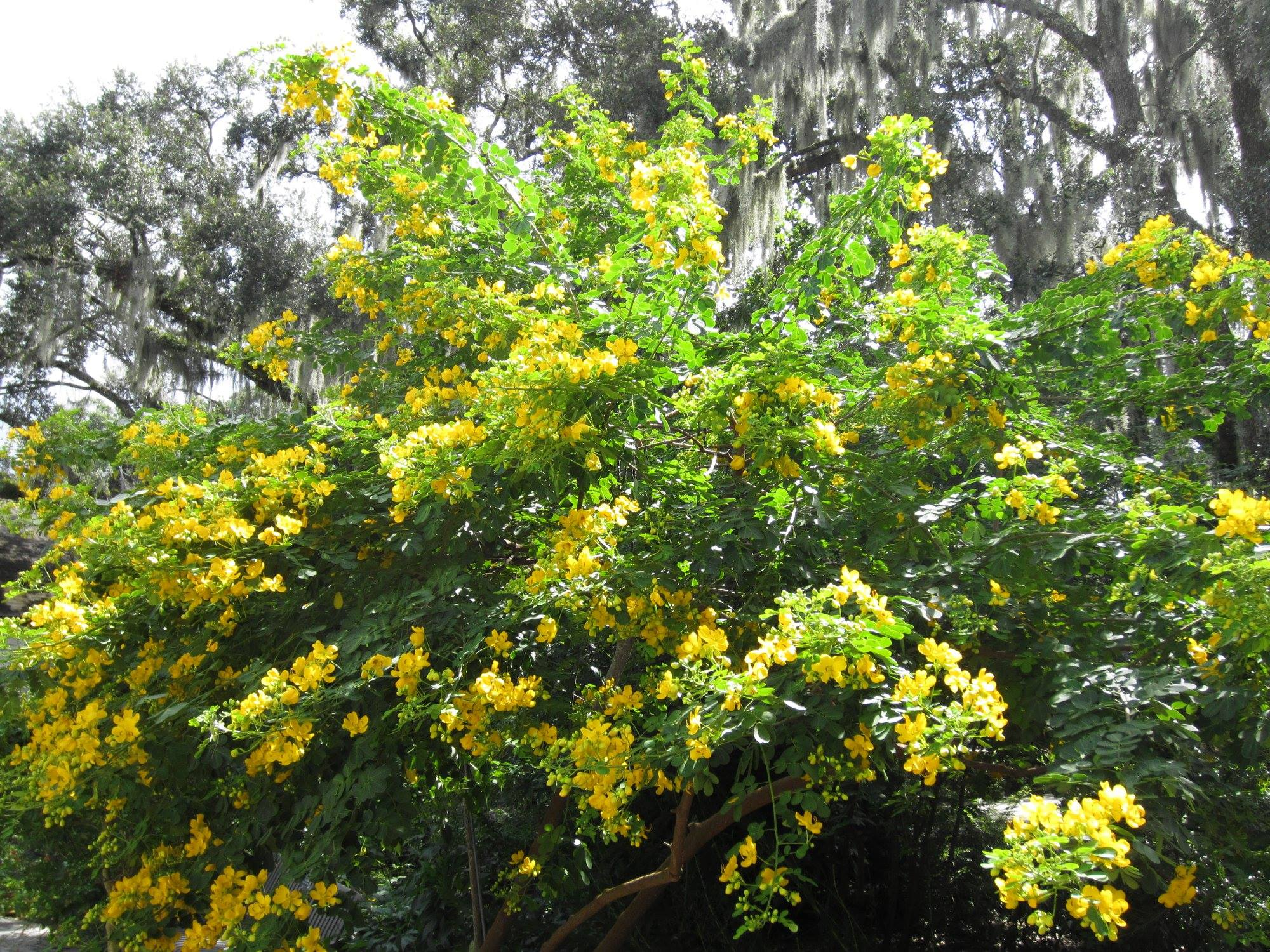
A large Easter cassia

17 varieties are accepted.

- Senna pendula var. ambigua H.S.Irwin & Barneby – southeastern Brazil
- Senna pendula var. dolichandra H.S.Irwin & Barneby – eastern Brazil
- Senna pendula var. eriocarpa (Griseb.) H.S.Irwin & Barneby – Bolivia and northwestern Argentina
- Senna pendula var. glabrata (Vogel) H.S.Irwin & Barneby – Bolivia, Brazil, and Paraguay
- Senna pendula var. hemirostrata (Lassen) H.S.Irwin & Barneby – Belize, Guatemala, and southeastern Mexico
- Senna pendula var. indecora (Kunth) Luckow – southern Mexico, Central America, the Caribbean, Colombia, and Venezuela
- Senna pendula var. indistincta H.S.Irwin & Barneby – northern and northeastern Brazil
- Senna pendula var. meticola H.S.Irwin & Barneby – Venezuela
- Senna pendula var. missionum H.S.Irwin & Barneby – northeastern Argentina (Misiones)
- Senna pendula var. ovalifolia (Britton & Rose) H.S.Irwin & Barneby – Mexico and northern Argentina
- Senna pendula var. paludicola H.S.Irwin & Barneby – Bolivia, northeastern Argentina, Uruguay, Paraguay, and southern and west-central Brazil
- Senna pendula var. pendula – Mexico to western Brazil
- Senna pendula var. praeandina H.S.Irwin & Barneby – Peru, Bolivia, and northern Brazil
- Senna pendula var. recondita H.S.Irwin & Barneby – southern Brazil
- Senna pendula var. scandens (Benth.) H.S.Irwin & Barneby – Bolivia and Peru
- Senna pendula var. stahlii (Urb.) H.S.Irwin & Barneby – Puerto Rico
- Senna pendula var. tenuifolia (Benth.) H.S.Irwin & Barneby – Peru, Bolivia, and western Brazil

== Cultivation ==
Senna pendula was introduced as a garden plant in Australia in 1957, where it was described in a Brisbane nursery catalogue as, "a useful shrub bearing masses of buttercup-shaped flowers in autumn and early winter". Much sought for, gardeners had paid four shillings to purchase this plant during the mid 20th century. The shrub was in the market for many decades, though now it is no longer sold due its invasive nature.

In Florida, Senna pendula is usually cultivated as, and misapplied to, Senna bicapsularis. An investigation of herbarium specimens from the University of Florida, University of South Florida, and Fairchild Tropical Botanic Garden had suggested that true Senna bicapsularis is very scarce in cultivation in Florida, whereas Senna pendula is more common and widespread.

== Invasive species ==
The S. p. glabrata variety has become naturalised, and is also an environmental weed, in eastern Australia in the coastal and sub-coastal regions of south-eastern Queensland and New South Wales, where it is found in watercourses, gardens, disturbed sites, wastelands, roadsides, closed forests, forest margins and urban bushland.

It is spread by seed, suckers and dumped garden waste. Despite it being invasive, it is not a prohibited or restricted invasive plant under the Biosecurity Act 2015.

== Gallery ==
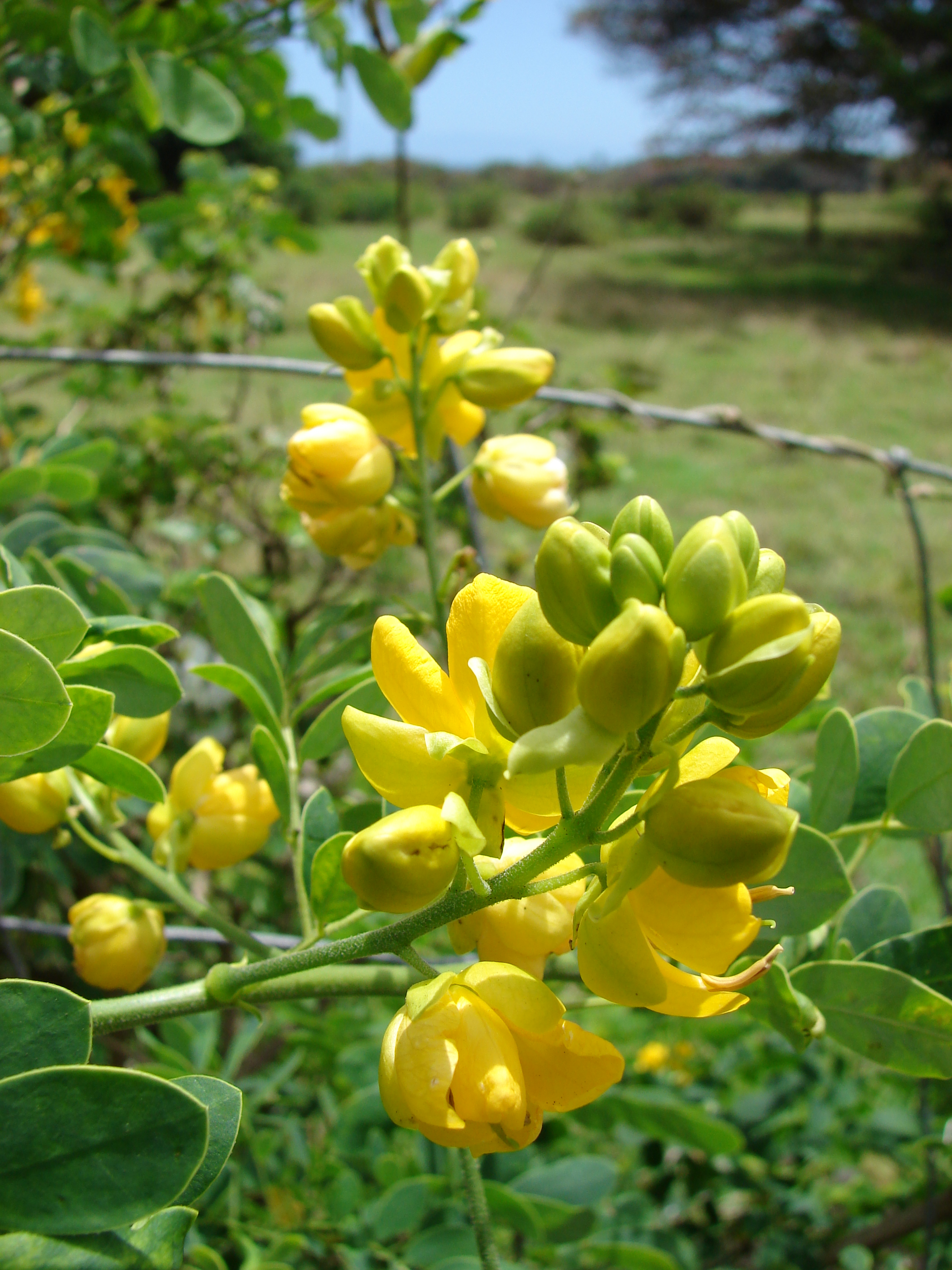
Budding flowers

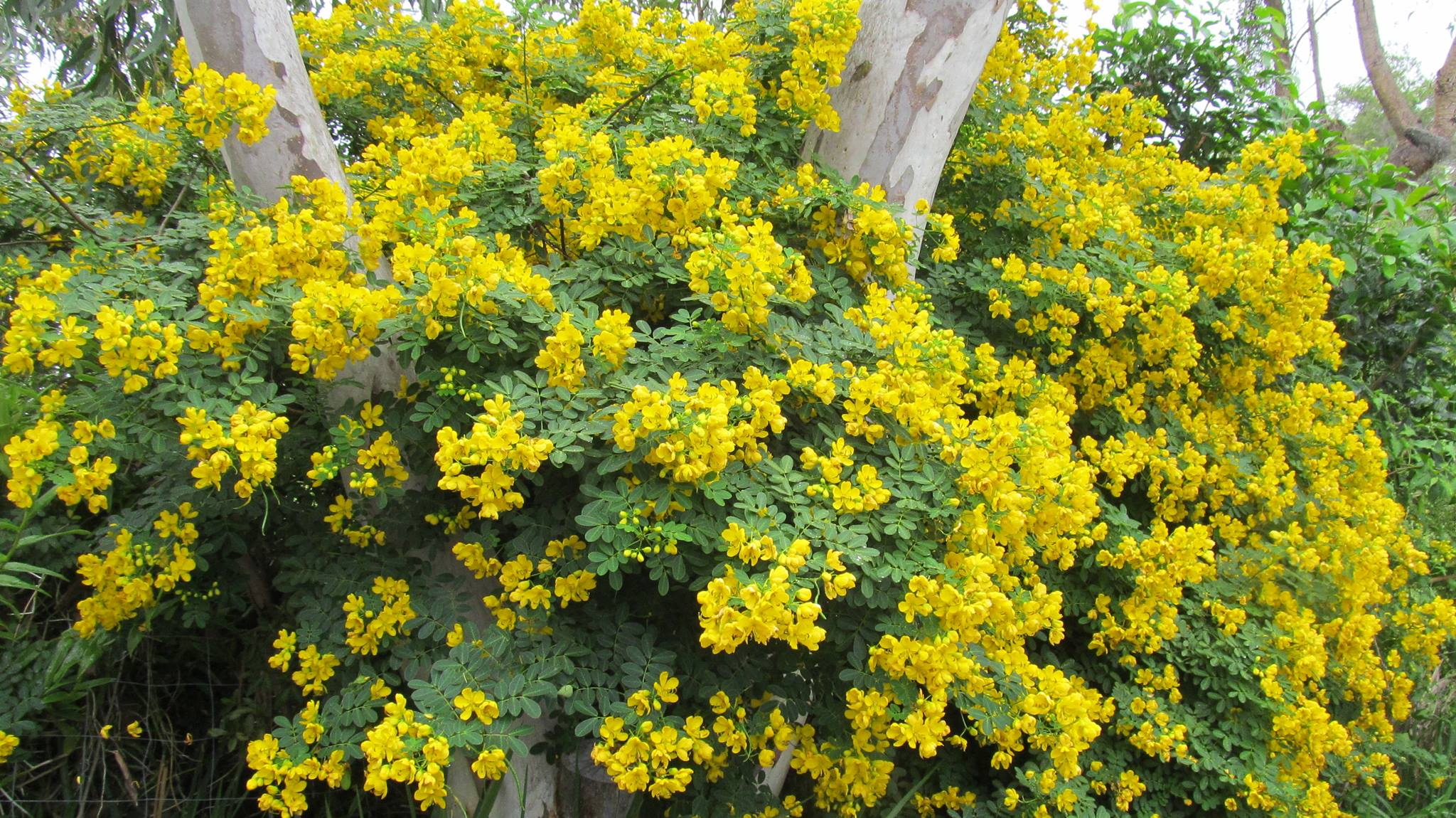
Growing towards a tree

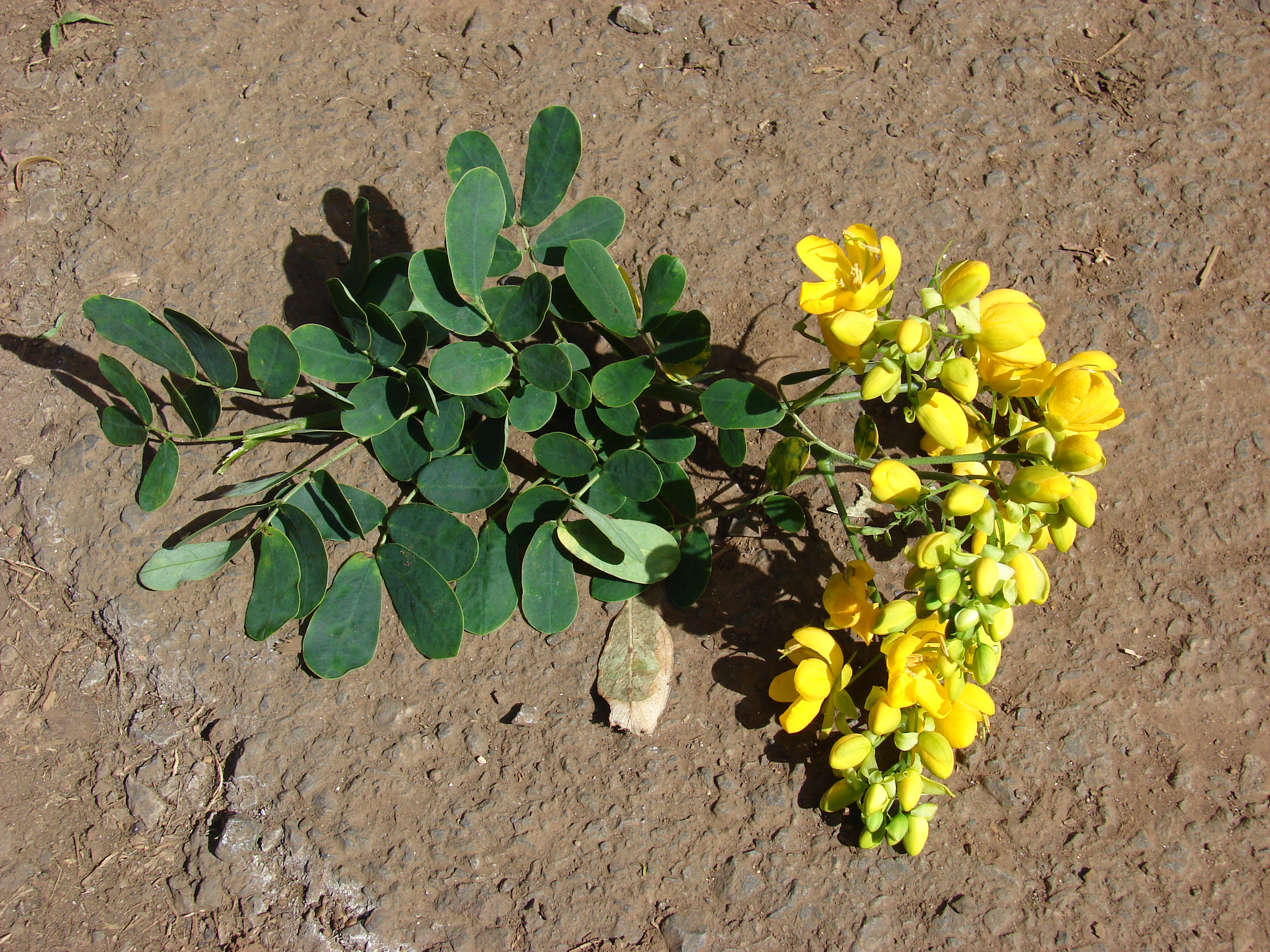
Cut flower

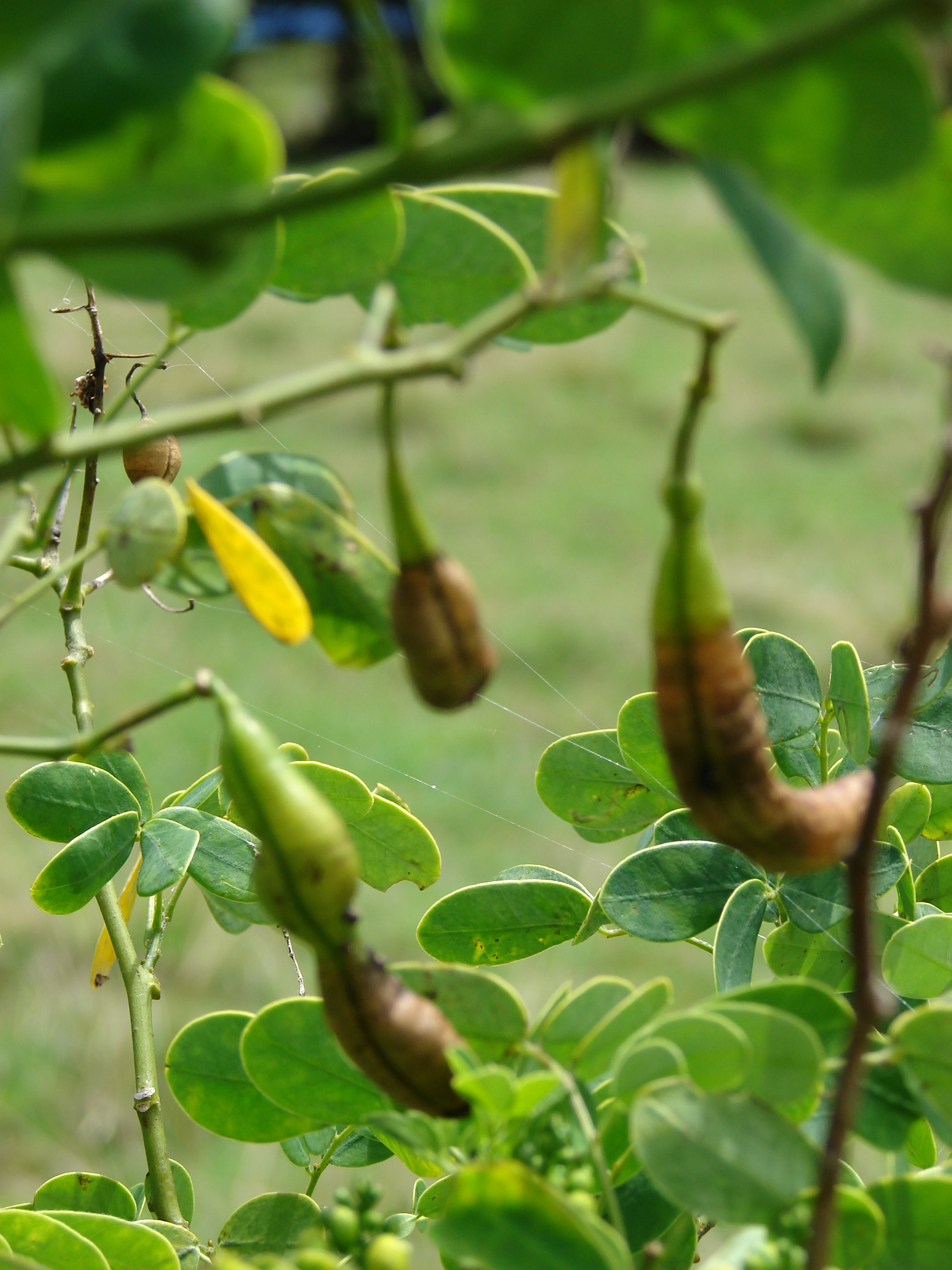
Seed pods

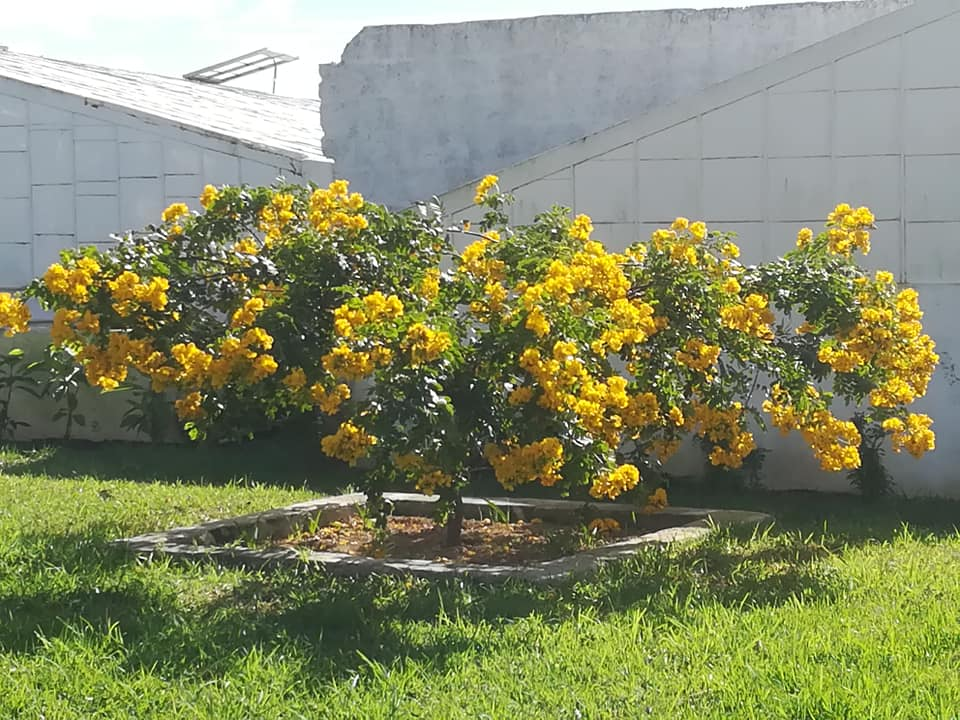
Ornamental plant

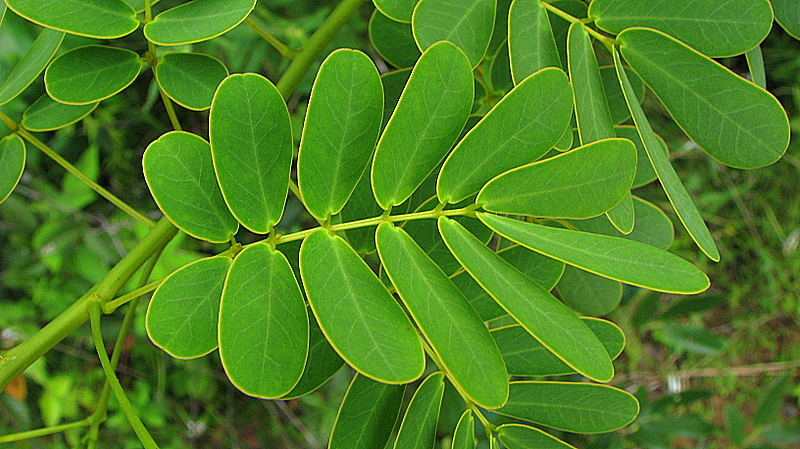
Leaves closeup

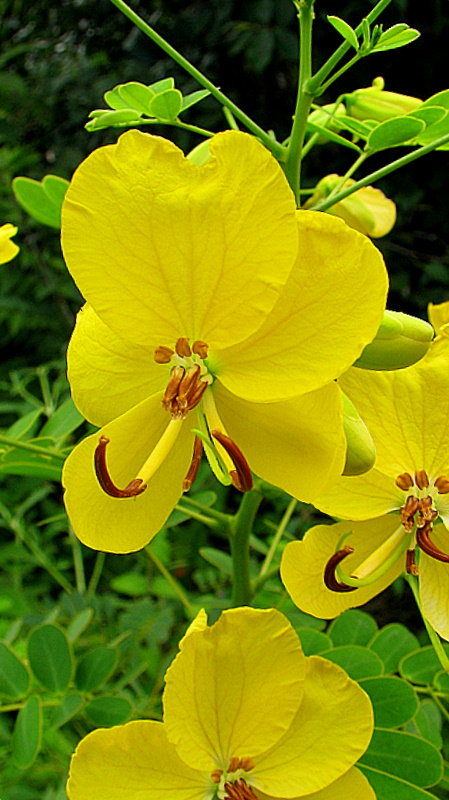
Flower closeup

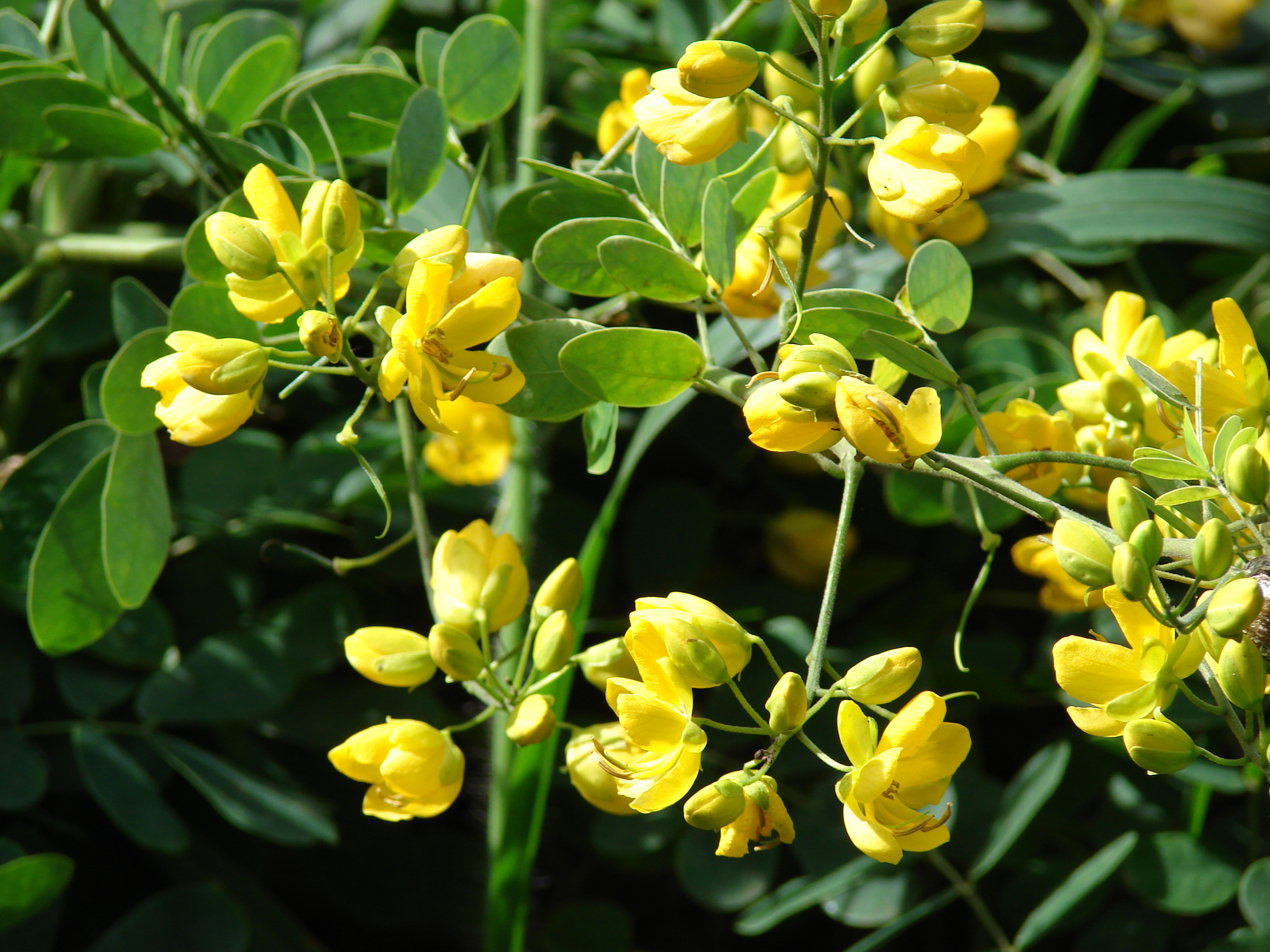
Leaves and flowers

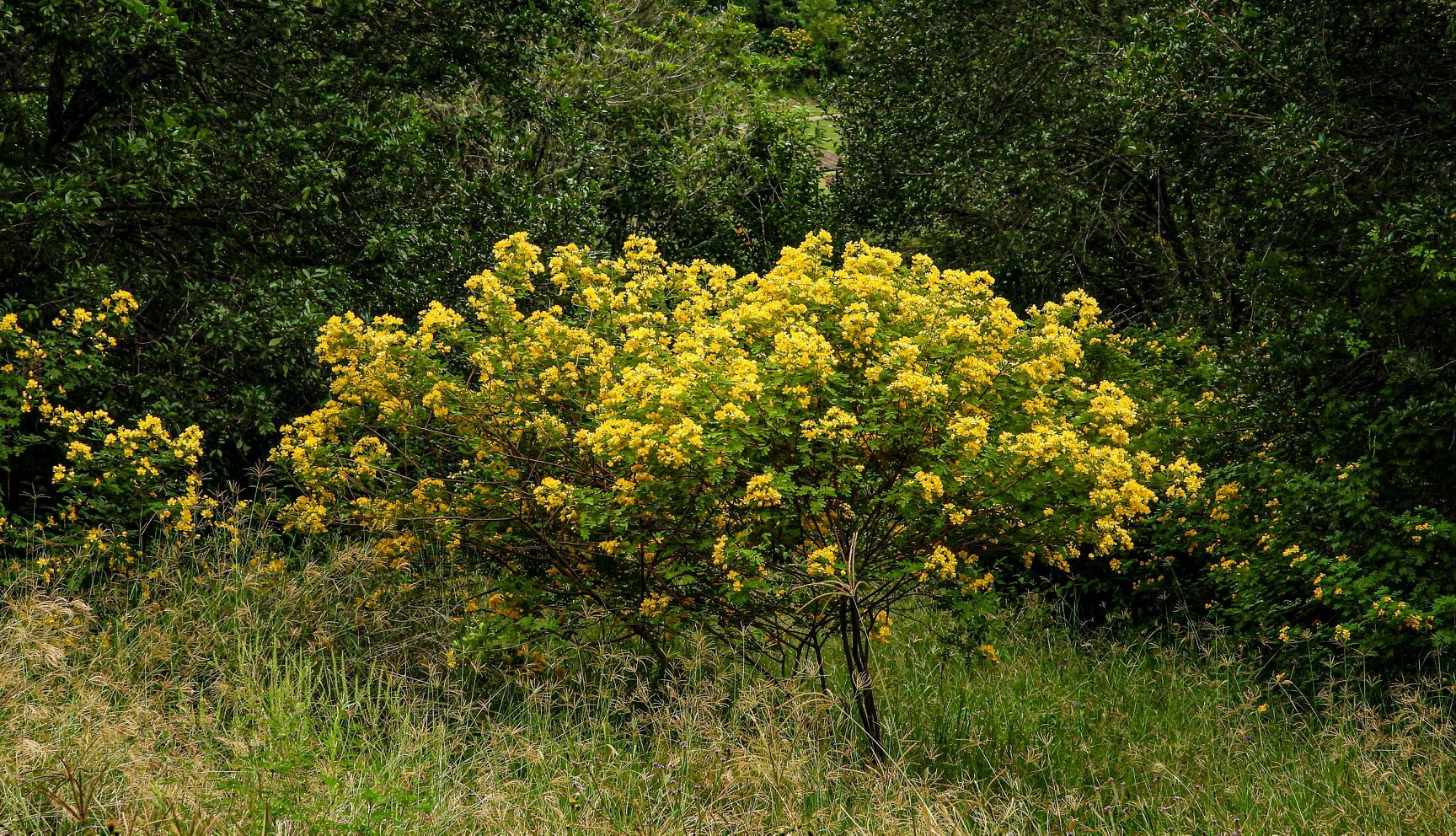
In a bushland
