= Pseudalbizzia edwallii =

Conservation status
- Least Concern (IUCN 3.1)

Scientific classification
- Kingdom: Plantae
- Clade: Tracheophytes
- Clade: Angiosperms
- Clade: Eudicots
- Clade: Rosids
- Order: Fabales
- Family: Fabaceae
- Genus: Pseudalbizzia
- Species: P. edwallii

Binomial name
- Pseudalbizzia edwallii (Hoehne) E.J.M.Koenen & Duno (2022)

Synonyms
- Albizia austrobrasilica Burkart (1979); Albizia edwallii (Hoehne) Barneby & J.W.Grimes (1996); Pithecellobium edwallii Hoehne (1926)

Species of legume

Pseudalbizzia edwallii is a species of plant in the family Fabaceae. It is native to northeastern Argentina and southeastern and southern Brazil.
