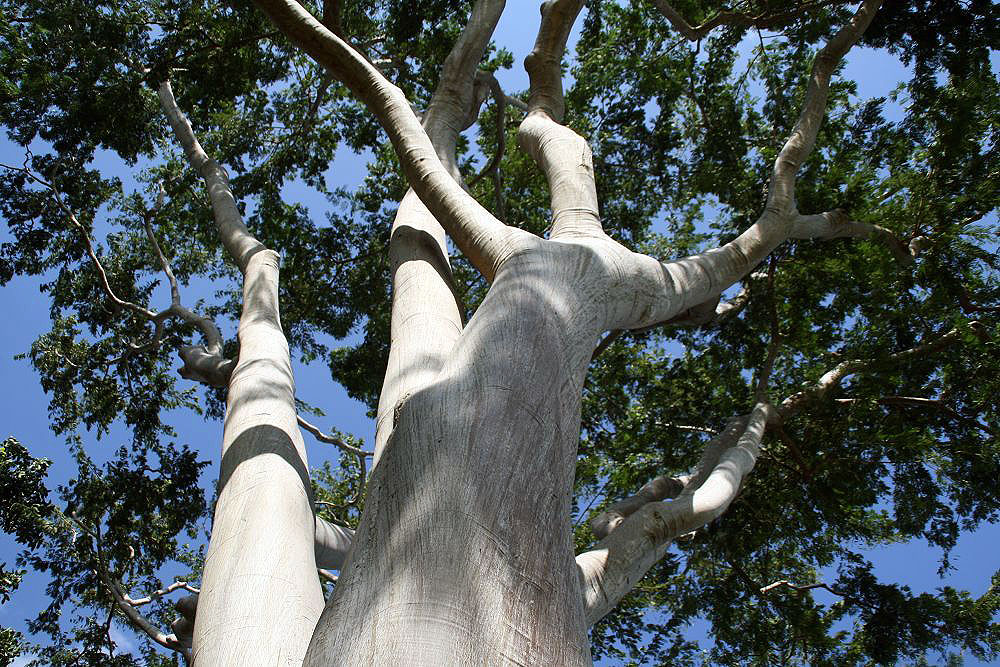
- Pseudalbizzia niopoides var. niopoides in the Fairchild Tropical Botanic Garden

Conservation status
- Least Concern (IUCN 3.1)

Scientific classification
- Kingdom: Plantae
- Clade: Tracheophytes
- Clade: Angiosperms
- Clade: Eudicots
- Clade: Rosids
- Order: Fabales
- Family: Fabaceae
- Genus: Pseudalbizzia
- Species: P. niopoides

Binomial name
- Pseudalbizzia niopoides (Spruce ex Benth.) E.J.M.Koenen & Duno (2022)
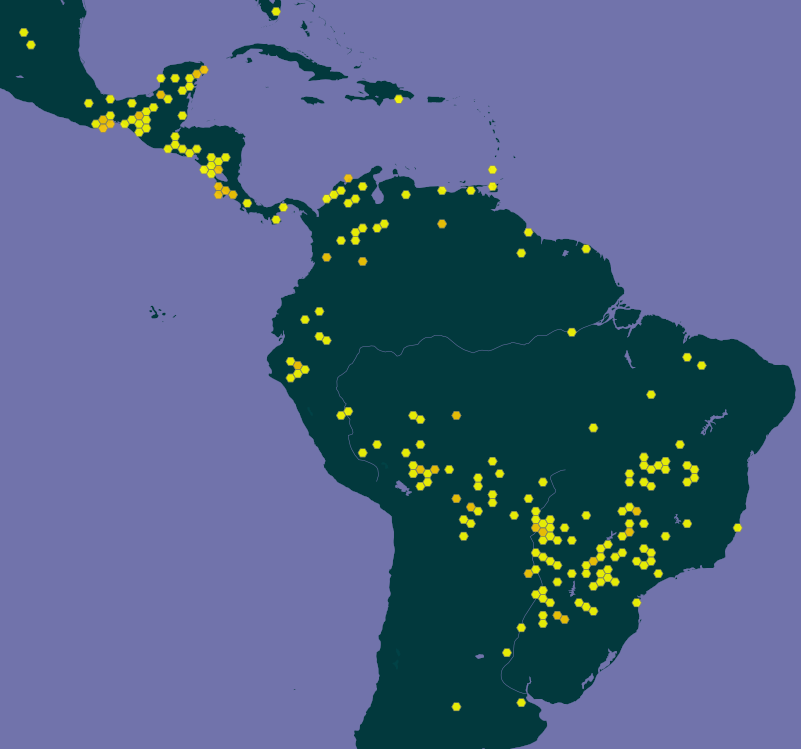
- Range map of Pseudalbizzia niopoides

Synonyms
- Albizia niopoides (Spruce ex Benth.) Burkart (1952); Feuilleea niopoides (Spruce ex Benth.) Kuntze (1891); Pithecellobium niopoides Spruce ex Benth. (1875)

= Pseudalbizzia niopoides =

Species of flowering plant

Pseudabizzia niopoides is a species of flowering plant in the pea family (Fabaceae). It is a tree native to the tropical Americas, ranging from southern Mexico to northeastern Argentina, including the Leeward and Windward Islands in the Caribbean.

The tree is widely distributed across a large range, and has a large population. It is not threatened, and its conservation status is assessed as least concern.

Two varieties are accepted:

- Pseudalbizzia niopoides var. colombiana (Britton) E.J.M.Koenen & Duno (syn. Albizia colombiana Britton) – Colombia and Venezuela
- Pseudalbizzia niopoides var. niopoides – southern Mexico to northeastern Argentina, including the Leeward and Windward Islands
