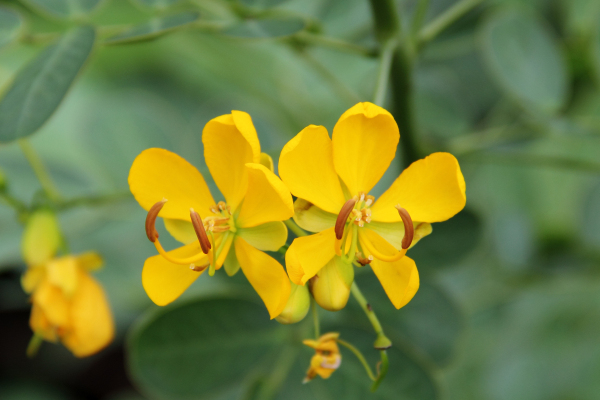

Conservation status
- Secure (NatureServe)

Scientific classification
- Kingdom: Plantae
- Clade: Tracheophytes
- Clade: Angiosperms
- Clade: Eudicots
- Clade: Rosids
- Order: Fabales
- Family: Fabaceae
- Subfamily: Caesalpinioideae
- Genus: Senna
- Species: S. bicapsularis

Binomial name
- Senna bicapsularis (L.) Roxb.

Synonyms
- Numerous, see text

= Senna bicapsularis =

Species of legume

Senna bicapsularis is a species of the legume genus Senna, native to northern South America, from Panama south to Venezuela and Colombia, and also the West Indies. Common names include rambling senna (formerly "cassia"), winter cassia, Christmas bush, money bush, and yellow candlewood. In Florida, Senna pendula is usually cultivated as, and misapplied to, S. bicapsularis.

== Description ==
It is a semi-evergreen shrub growing to 3.5 m tall with a low spreading crown that reproduces by seed. It can grow from 2 – 12 metres tall and it branches from near the base.

The leaves are 2.5–9 cm long, pinnate, with six to eight leaflets; the leaflets are 1.6–4.5 cm long and 1.1–2.3 cm broad. The yellow flowers are produced in masses with a few together on short racemes and 12–16 mm long. The plant flowers from autumn to winter, attracting bees and butterflies.

Senna bicapsularis is distinguished from Senna pendula by having 3 pairs of leaflets on each leaf and elongated pedicels (flower stalks), while S. pendula has 4-7 pairs of leaflets on each leaf and a gland between each pair of leaflets, with shorter flower stalks. S. bicapsularis flowers from late fall to winter depending on climate, whilst S. pendula can flower from as early as late summer. Senna pendula can grow very easily from seed, while Senna bicapsularis has a tough seed coat that needs mechanical scarification to sprout with success.

== Uses ==
In the 20th century, the plant may have been used as a traditional medicine to counteract the effects of arthropod stings, and in Mexico, a decoction was intended as a remedy for whooping cough. The seedpod flavour resembles tamarind.

== Invasive species ==
It is naturalised and invasive in several coastal areas in the tropics, including Tanzania, Kenya, the Galápagos Islands and New Caledonia, where it is found in roadsides and disturbed areas, wooded grasslands, fallow land and riparian zones.

=== Chemistry ===
The leaves and stems contain chaksinelike alkaloids. The seeds contain galactomannan. The presence in the plant of cassin, 2,6-dialkyl-3-hydroxypyridine and socassidine has also been reported.

== Synonyms ==
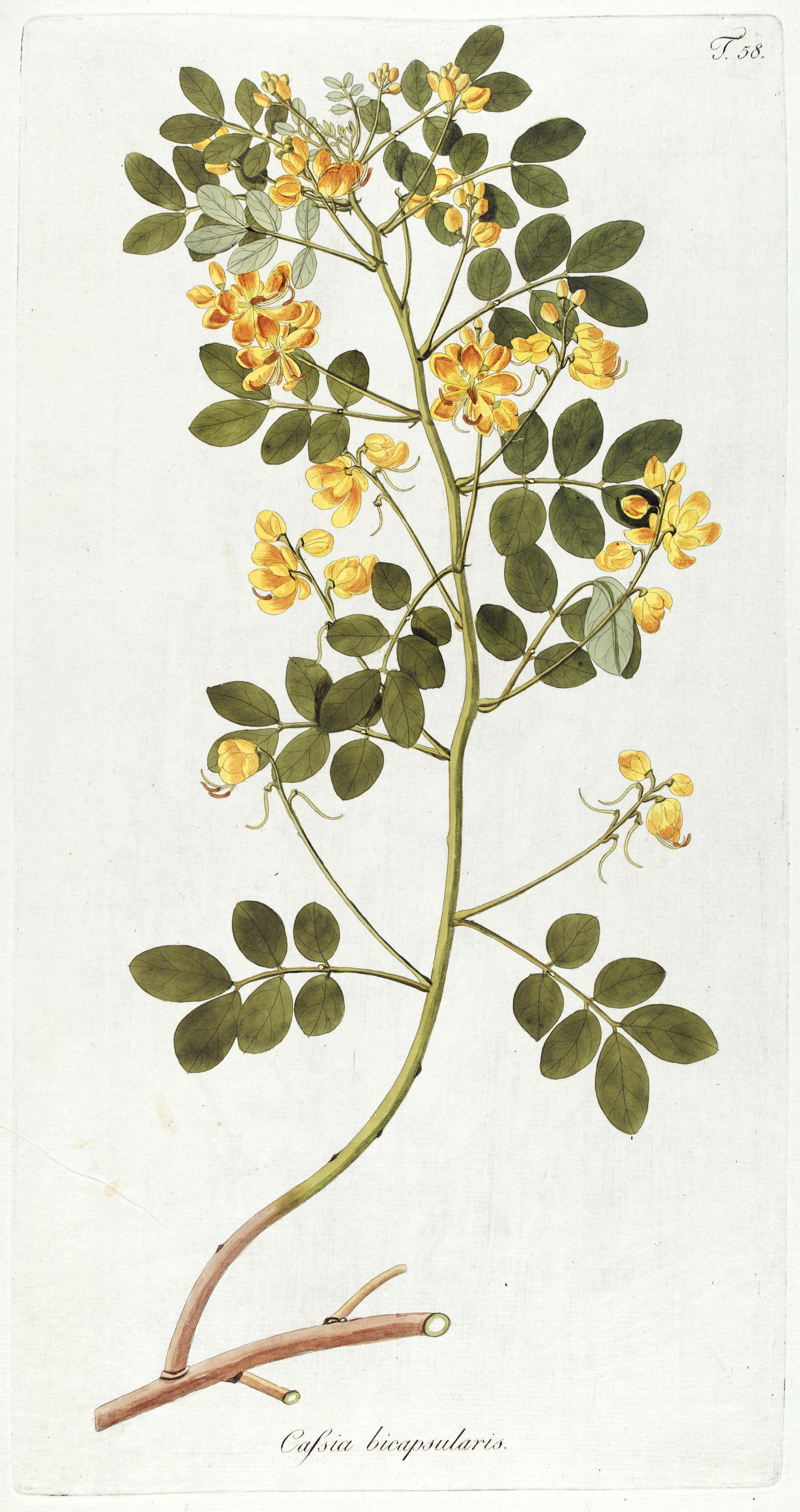
Botanical illustration

Senna bicapsularis has been described under a wide variety of names that are today considered its synonyms. Some of these were also applied to related plants in error. This phenomenon has happened with other taxa, which were mis-applied to this plant:

- Adipera bicapsularis (L.) Britton & Wilson
- Adipera spiciflora Pittier
- Cassia berterii Colla
- Cassia bicapsularis L.

Cassia bicapsularis sensu Bojer is erroneous for Senna pendula.
Cassia bicapsularis of other authors is erroneous for Senna pendula var. glabrata

- Cassia bicapsularis L. var. aristata DC.

Cassia aristata Benth. is a synonym of Chamaecrista aristata

- Cassia bicapsularis L. var. quadrijuga DC.
- Cassia collae G.Don
- Cassia emarginata L.

Cassia emarginata Clos is a synonym of Senna candolleana
Cassia emarginata Mill. is a synonym of Chamaecrista pilosa

- Cassia inflata Spreng.
- Cassia laevigata sensu Prain

Cassia laevigata Willd. is a synonym of Senna septemtrionalis
Cassia laevigata of other authors is erroneous for Senna occidentalis

- Cassia limensis Lam.
- Cassia sennoides Jacq.
- Cassia spiciflora (Pittier) Pittier
- Cathartocarpus bicapsularis (L.) Ham.
- Chamaefistula inflata G.Don
- Isandrina arborescens Raf.
- Isandrina emarginata (L.) Britton & Rose
