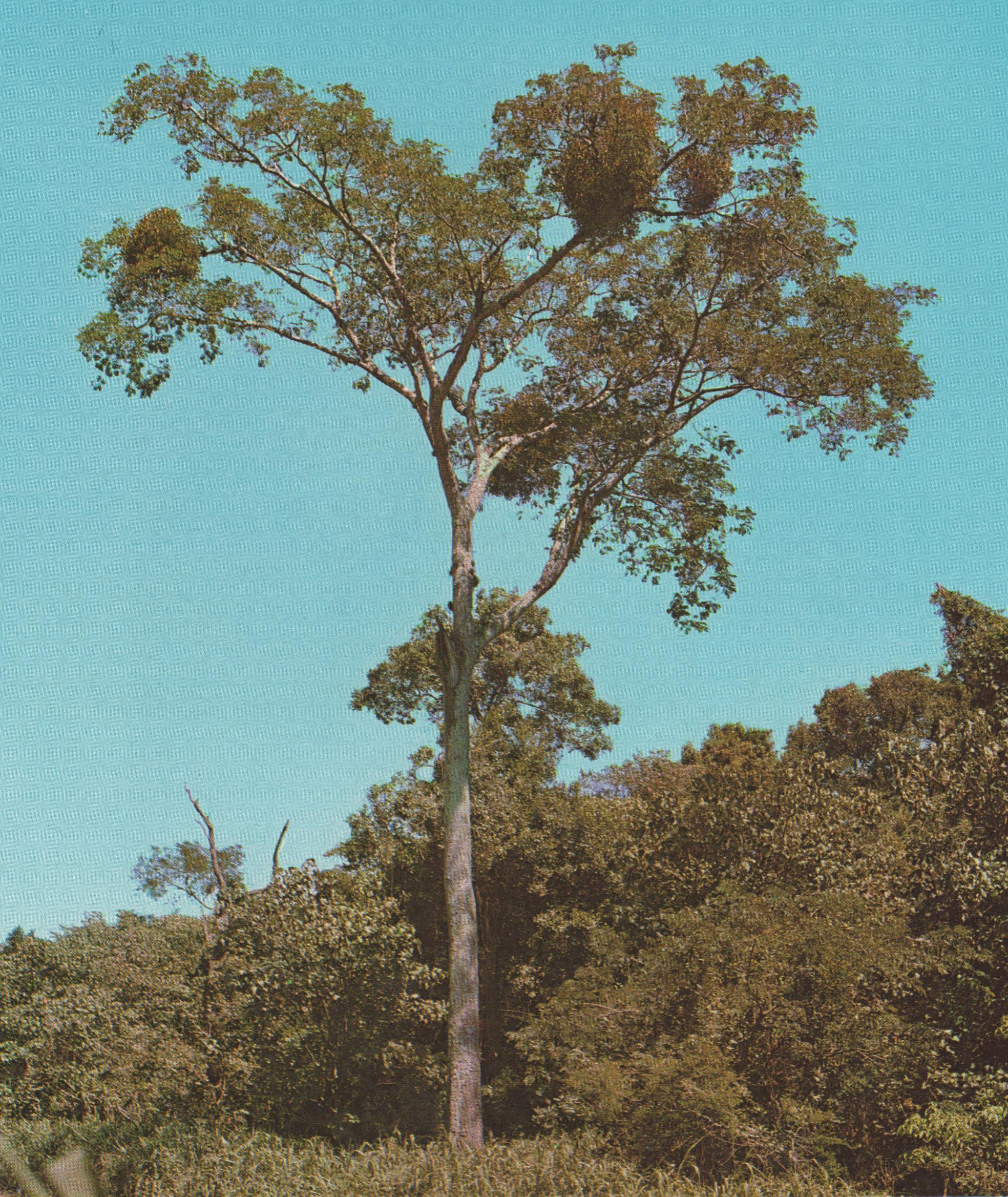

Conservation status
- Least Concern (IUCN 3.1)

Scientific classification
- Kingdom: Plantae
- Clade: Tracheophytes
- Clade: Angiosperms
- Clade: Eudicots
- Clade: Rosids
- Order: Fabales
- Family: Fabaceae
- Genus: Pseudalbizzia
- Species: P. inundata

Binomial name
- Pseudalbizzia inundata (Mart.) E.J.M.Koenen & Duno (2022)

Synonyms
- Acacia inundata Mart. (1823); Acacia multiflora Spreng. (1826), nom. illeg.; Acacia polyantha A.Spreng. (1828); Albizia inundata (Mart.) Barneby & J.W. Grimes (1996); Albizia polyantha (A.Spreng.) G.J.Lewis (1987); Arthrosamanea polyantha (A.Spreng.) Burkart (1949); Arthrosamanea polycephala (Griseb.) Burkart (1949); Cathormion polyanthum (A.Spreng.) Burkart (1964); Cathormion polycephala (Griseb.) Burkart (1964); Enterolobium polycephala Griseb. (1879); Feuilleea polycephala (Griseb.) Kuntze (1891); Pithecellobium multiflorum var. brevipedunculatum Chodat & Hassl. (1904); Pithecellobium pendulum Lindm. (1898)

= Pseudalbizzia inundata =

Species of legume

Pseudalbizzia inundata is a perennial tree native to South America. Common names include maloxo, muqum, paloflojo, timbo blanco, timbo-ata, and also "canafistula" though this usually refers Cassia fistula.

It grows to a height of up to 20 m. The leaves of Pseudalbizzia inundata contain dimethyltryptamine, a hallucinogenic drug.

== Range ==
Pseudalbizzia inundata ranges through Brazil to Bolivia, Paraguay, Uruguay, and northern Argentina.

== Synonyms ==
The species was first described as Acacia inundata in 1823. In 2022 it was reclassified into the revived genus Pseudalbizzia. The synonymy of this species can be confusing. Related plants have been described by various authors under the same name as Albizia inundata. Junior synonyms of P. inundata are:

- Acacia inundata Mart. (1823)
- Acacia multiflora Spreng. (1826), nom. illeg.
- Acacia polyantha A.Spreng. (1828)
- Albizia inundata (Mart.) Barneby & J.W. Grimes (1996)
- Albizia polyantha (A.Spreng.) G.J.Lewis (1987)
- Arthrosamanea polyantha (A.Spreng.) Burkart (1949)
- Arthrosamanea polycephala (Griseb.) Burkart (1949)
- Cathormion polyanthum (A.Spreng.) Burkart (1964)
- Cathormion polycephala (Griseb.) Burkart (1964)
- Enterolobium polycephala Griseb. (1879)
- Feuilleea polycephala (Griseb.) Kuntze (1891)
- Pithecellobium multiflorum var. brevipedunculatum Chodat & Hassl. (1904)
- Pithecellobium pendulum Lindm. (1898)

== See also ==
- Psychedelic plants
