= Dominica cuisine =

Cuisine commonly eaten in the country Dominica

Dominica cuisine is the cuisine of the island nation of Dominica. The cuisine is rooted in Caribbean creole techniques with local produce flavored by spices found on the island. Dominica's cuisine is a mixture of indigenous Kalinago, African, French, and English influences.

== Foods ==
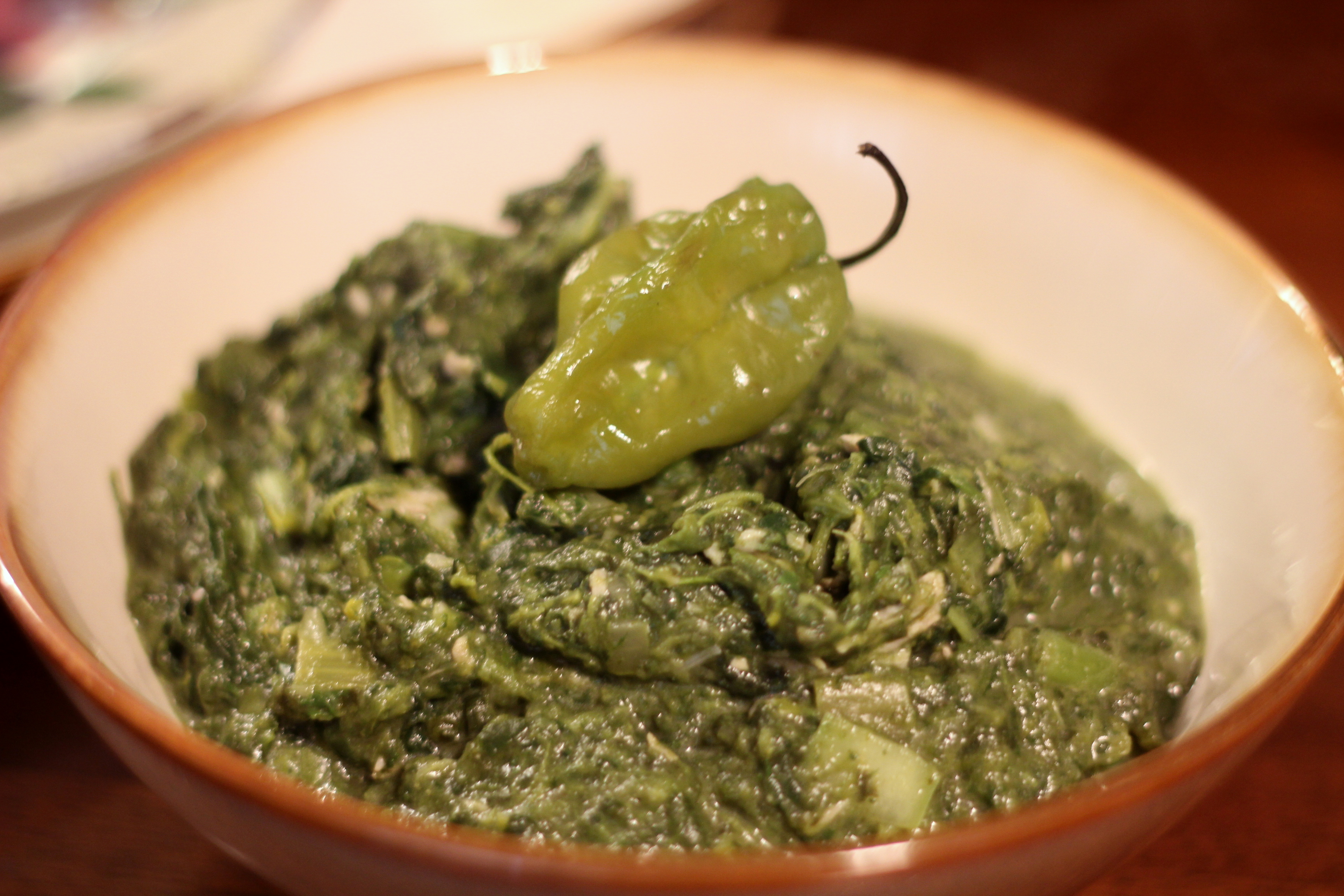
Callaloo

The national dish is callaloo, a soup that includes leafy greens, coconut milk, and sometimes salted meat or seafood. It is frequently paired with rice, dumplings, or breadfruit. Another favorite dish in Dominica is souse, which consists of pickled meat, usually pork or chicken, and is flavored with lime juice, onions, and hot peppers. This dish is generally eaten as a snack or appetizer.

"Green fig and saltfish" is another traditional meal in Dominica, made with green bananas and salted codfish, seasoned with onions, peppers, and garlic. It is often accompanied by boiled eggs or avocado. Other dishes in Dominica include "Bake and Saltfish," a breakfast option that features fried dough and salted codfish, and "Fish Broth," a soup made with various seafood and vegetables. Tropical fruits like mangoes, pineapples, passionfruit, and papayas often appear in salads, sauces, and desserts.

Common vegetables eaten during lunchtime or dinner include plantains, tannia, yams, potatoes, rice, and peas. Meat and poultry include the very popular chicken, beef, fish (normally stewed down with onions), carrots, garlic, ginger, and herbs like thyme; the browning method is used to create a rich dark sauce. Popular meals include rice and peas, stewed chicken, stewed beef, fried and stewed fish, and many different types of hearty fish broths and soups containing dumplings, carrots and ground provisions. Goat water, curried goat and pelau are popular dishes.

Roadside stands and small-town restaurants typically serve fried chicken, fish-and-chips and "tasty bakes", fried dough made with flour, water and sugar or sometimes salt, along with cold drinks.

Dominica's national dish was the mountain chicken, which are snares of the legs of a frog called the crapaud, which is endemic to Dominica and Montserrat. Found at higher elevations, it is a protected species and can only be caught between autumn and February. Callaloo became the new national dish in 2013.

Stewed agouti and manicou are considered delacicies on the island Dominican.

== Beverages ==
Rivers flowing from the mountains provide Dominica supply fresh water. Most local juices are made using limes, passionfruit, grapefruit, oranges, tamarinds or guavas.

Especially during Christmas time, a brew is made from boiling the calyces of the sorrel plant. A drink commonly served with breakfasts is cacao tea, made from boiling cocoa sticks with cinnamon and bay leaves. Other drinks include rum punch and smoothies.

Dominica tea culture has a long history. Many traditional medicinal teas have origins with the original Carib culture of the island. The most popular teas in Dominica is cocoa tea which made from the local cocoa bean. Cocoa tea is similar to a hot chocolate and bush tea, which is made from local plants and herbs in Dominica. Dominica brews its beer under the Kubuli label.

Rum and coconut water are also popular.

== Bibliography ==
- Mayma Raphael (2022). Dominica Gourmet: A Unique Spin on Traditional Dominican Cuisine. Mom Publishing. ISBN 978-0998481715.
- Hyacinth I.R. Elwin; Loye Barnard; Sylvia Duckworth; Lennox Honeychurch (1998). A Taste of Nature Island Cooking: Dominican Cuisine. Macmillan Education. ISBN 978-0-333-71970-1.
