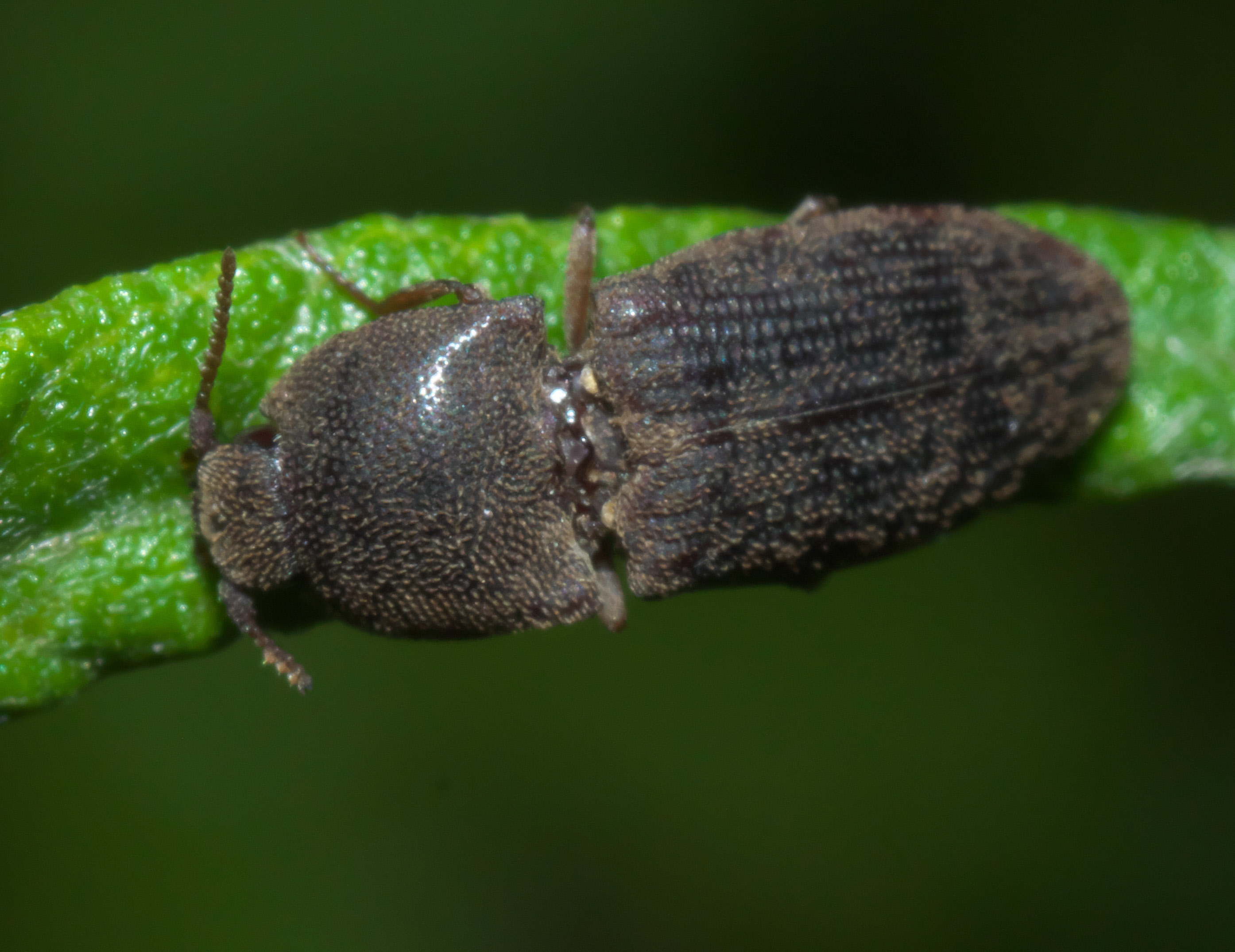
- Agrypnus rectangularis

Scientific classification
- Domain: Eukaryota
- Kingdom: Animalia
- Phylum: Arthropoda
- Class: Insecta
- Order: Coleoptera
- Suborder: Polyphaga
- Infraorder: Elateriformia
- Family: Elateridae
- Subfamily: Agrypninae
- Tribe: Agrypnini; Candèze, 1857

= Agrypnini =

Tribe of beetles

Agrypnini is a tribe of click beetles in the family Elateridae.

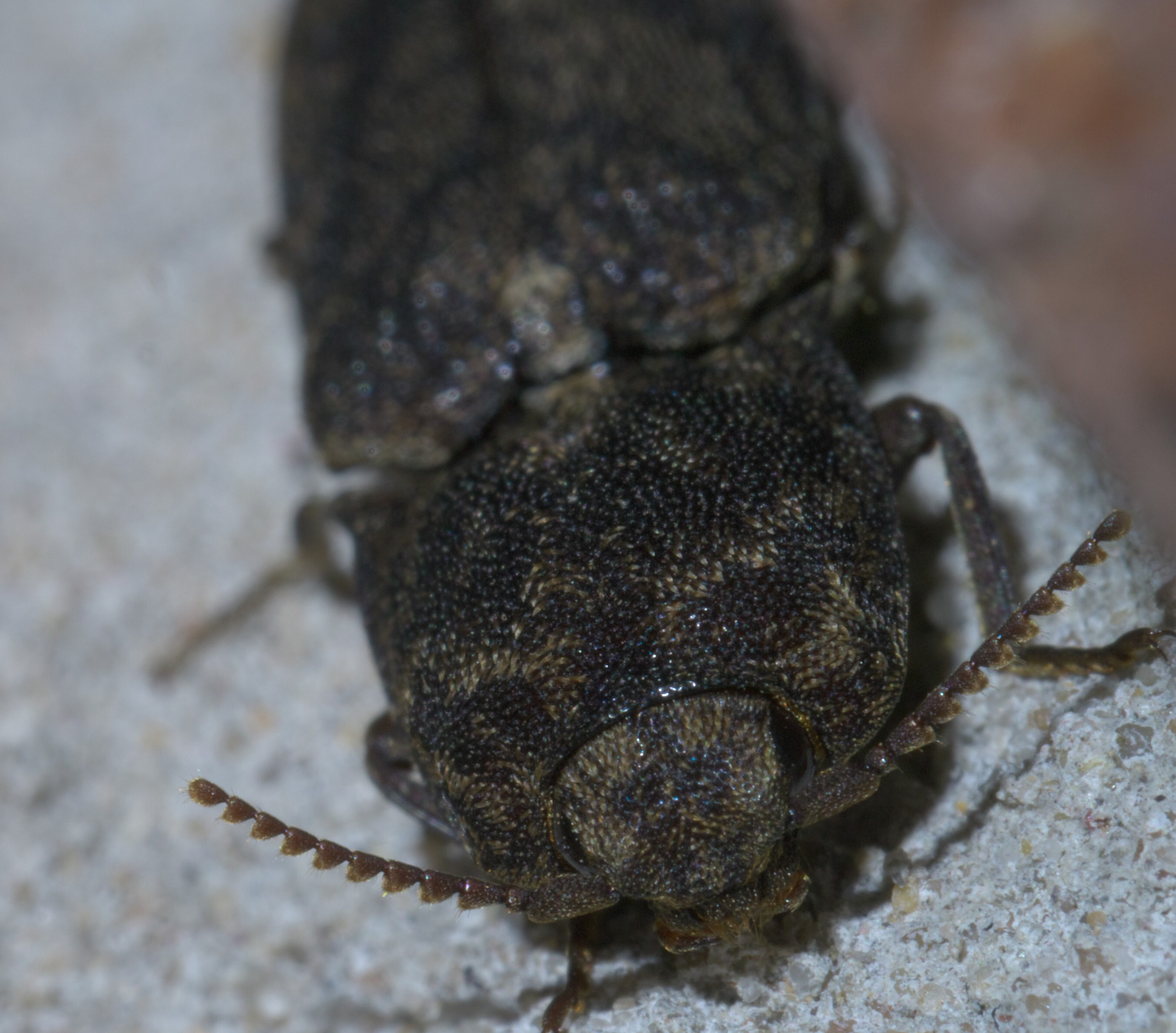
Lacon marmoratus

== Genera ==
- Acrocryptus Candèze, 1874
- Adelocera Latreille, 1829
- Agraeus Candèze, 1857
- Agrypnus Eschscholtz, 1829
- Candanius Hayek, 1973
- Carlota Arias-Bohart, 2014
- Christinea Gurjeva, 1987
- Compresselater Platia & Gudenzi, 2006
- Compsolacon Reitter, 1905
- Danosoma Thomson, 1859
- Dilobitarsus Latreille, 1834
- Eidolus Candèze, 1857
- Elasmosomus Schwarz, 1902
- Hemicleus Candèze, 1857
- Lacon Laporte, 1838
- Lobotarsus Schwarz, 1898
- Meristhus Candèze, 1857
- Octocryptus Candèze, 1892
- Optaleus Candèze, 1857
- Rismethus Fleutiaux, 1947
- Saudilacon Chassain, 1983
- Scaphoderus Candèze, 1857
- Stangellus Golbach, 1975
- Sulcilacon Fleutiaux, 1927
- Trieres Candèze, 1900
