= Oophorini =

Scientific classification
- Kingdom: Animalia
- Phylum: Arthropoda
- Class: Insecta
- Order: Coleoptera
- Suborder: Polyphaga
- Infraorder: Elateriformia
- Family: Elateridae
- Subfamily: Agrypninae
- Tribe: Oophorini; Gistel, 1848

Synonyms
- Monocrepidiini Candèze, 1859; Drasteriini Houlbert, 1912 (Unav.); Aeolini Jakobson, 1913 (Unav.); Conoderini Fleutiaux, 1919 (Unav.); Pachyderini Fleutiaux, 1919

Tribe of beetles

The Oophorini form an accepted taxonomic tribe within the Elateridae (click beetle) subfamily Agrypninae.

== Genera ==
- Aeoloderma Fleutiaux, 1928
- Aeoloides Schwarz, 1906
- Aeolosomus Dolin, 1982
- Aeolus Eschscholtz, 1829
- Apochresis Candèze, 1882
- Babadrasterius Ôhira, 1994
- Deronocus Johnson, 1997
- Drasterius Eschscholtz, 1829
- Gahanus Platia, 2012
- Grammephorus Solier, 1851
- Hartenius Platia, 2007
- Heteroderes Latreille, 1834
- Melanthoides Candèze, 1865
- Monocrepidius Eschscholtz, 1829 (syn. = Conoderus)
- Nanseia Kishii, 1985
- Neodrasterius Kishii, 1966
- Pachyderes Guérin-Méneville, 1829
- Paraheteroderes Girard, 2017
- Phedomenus Candèze, 1889
- Pseudaeolus Candèze, 1891
- Telesus Candèze, 1880
