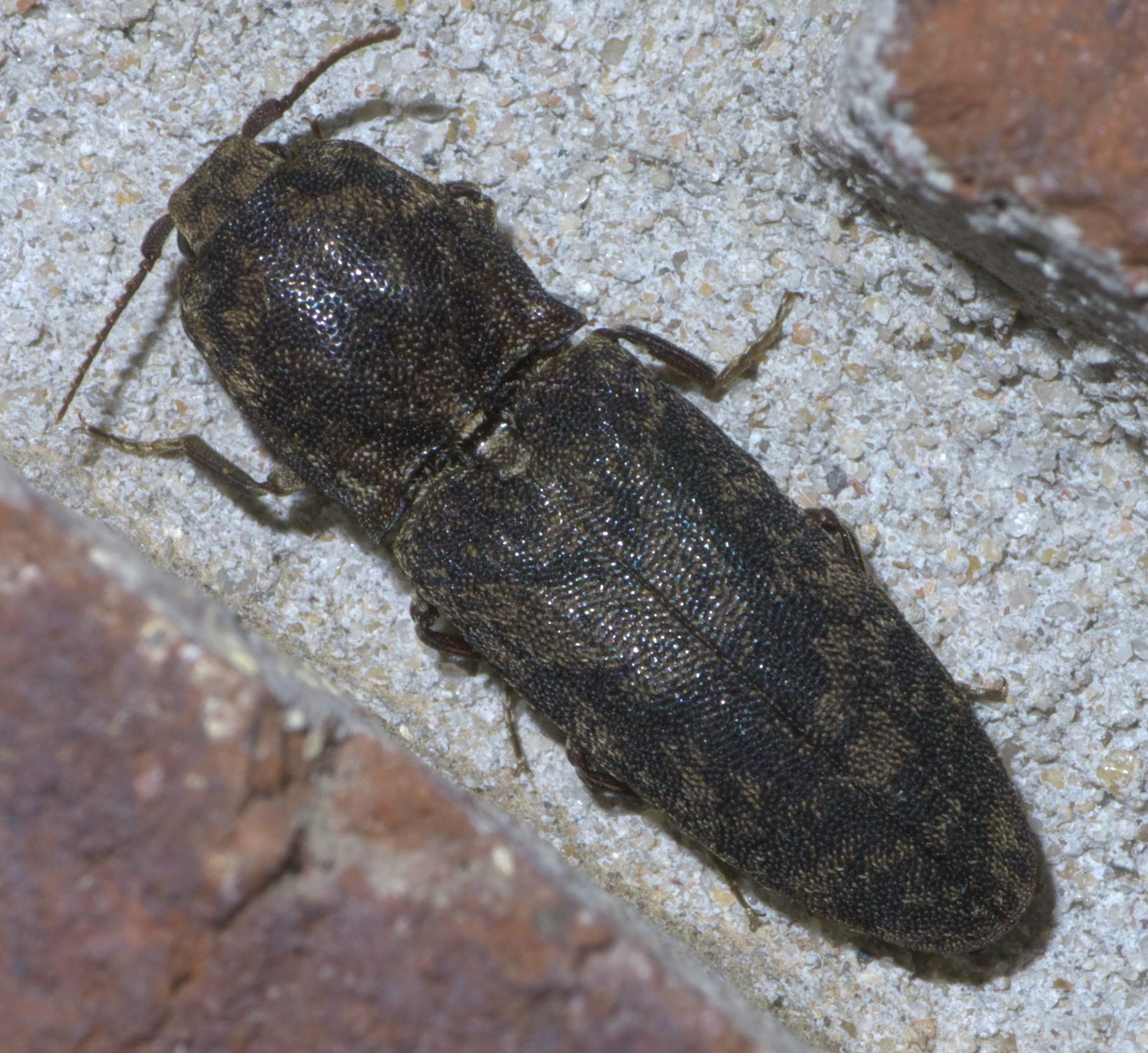

Scientific classification
- Domain: Eukaryota
- Kingdom: Animalia
- Phylum: Arthropoda
- Class: Insecta
- Order: Coleoptera
- Suborder: Polyphaga
- Infraorder: Elateriformia
- Family: Elateridae
- Subfamily: Agrypninae
- Genus: Lacon
- Species: L. marmoratus

Binomial name
- Lacon marmoratus (Fabricius, 1801)

= Lacon marmoratus =

Species of beetle

Lacon marmoratus, the marbled click beetle, is a species of click beetle in the family Elateridae.

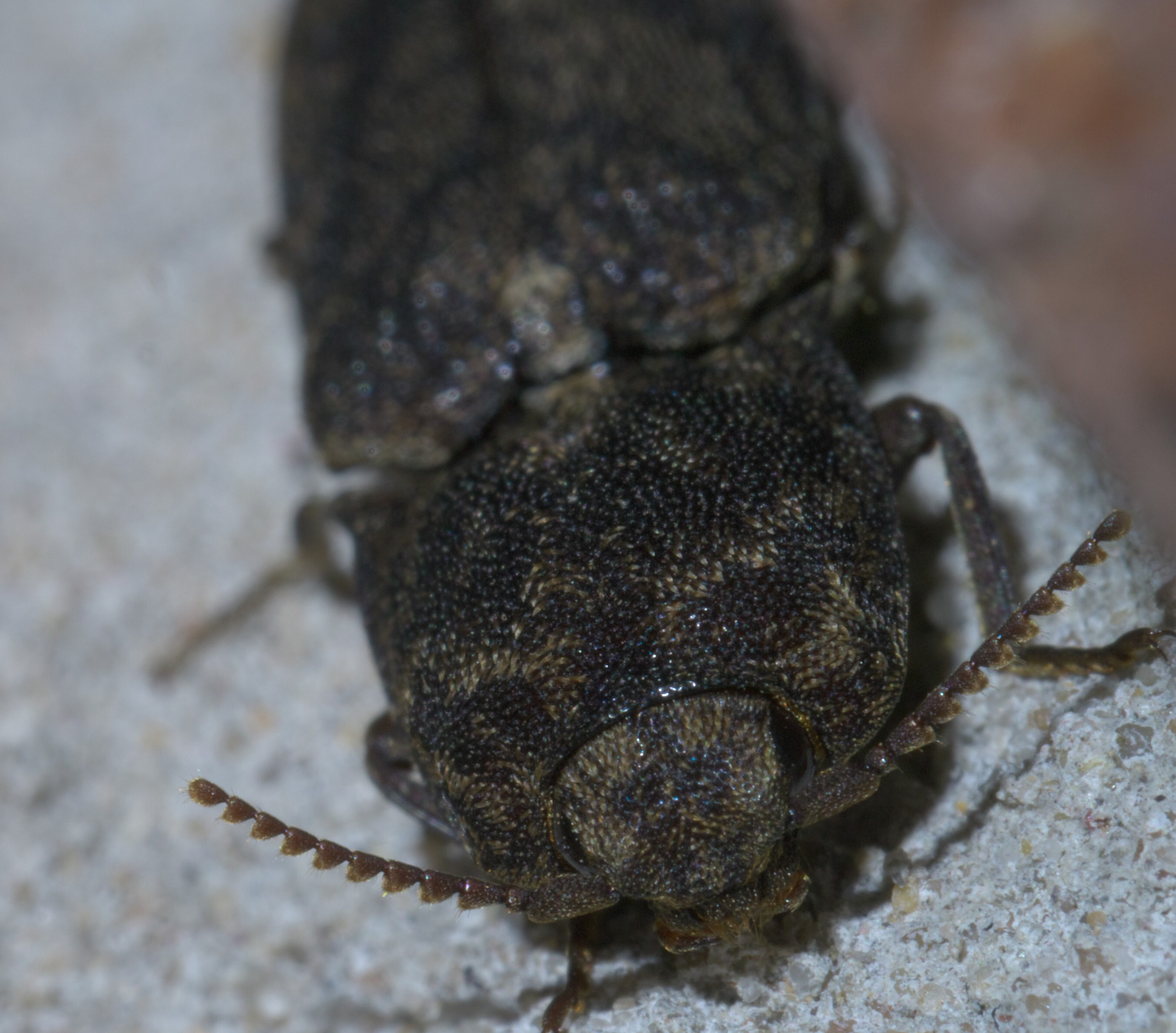
Marbled click beetle, Lacon marmoratus
