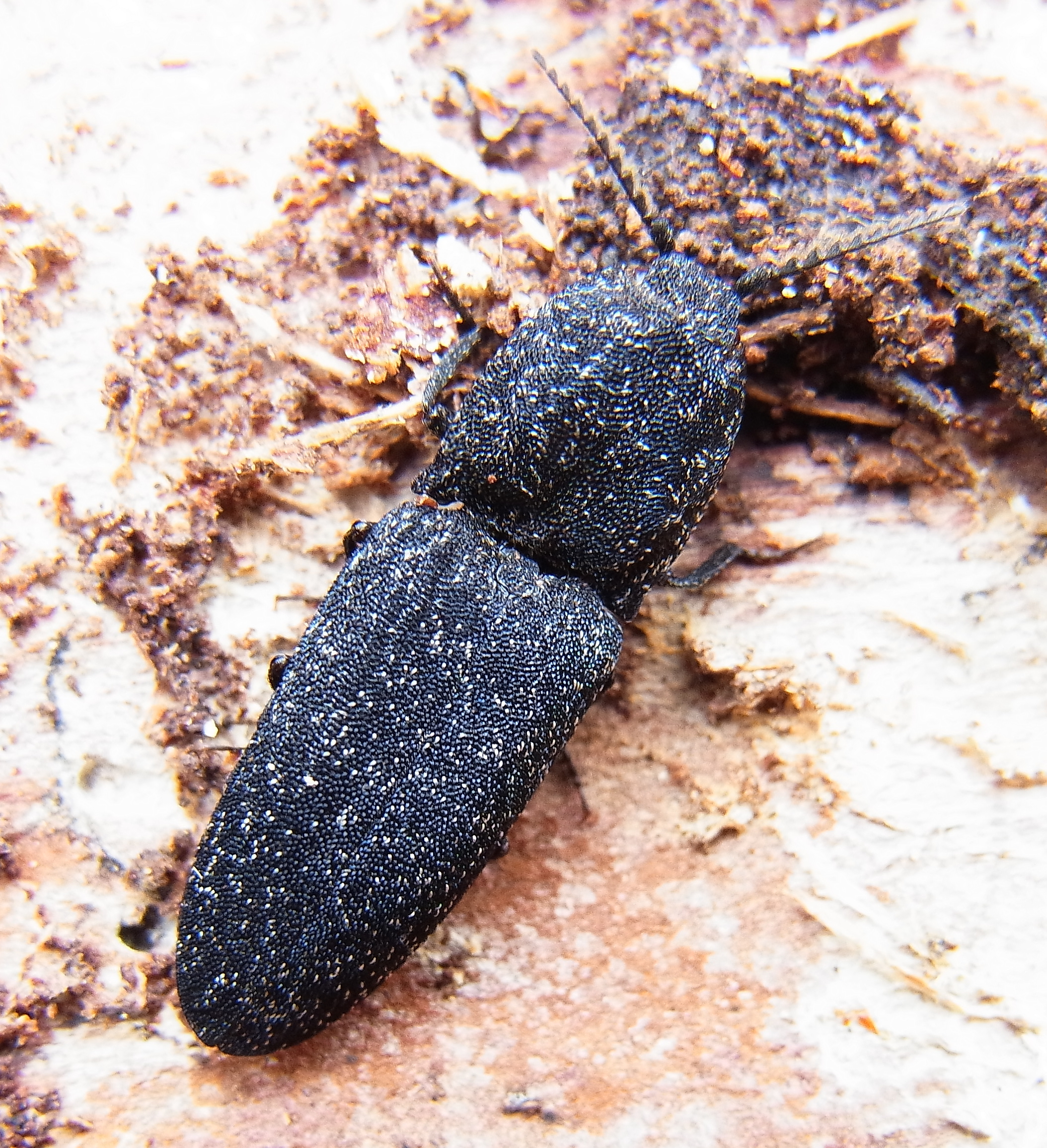
- Lacon punctatus

Scientific classification
- Kingdom: Animalia
- Phylum: Arthropoda
- Class: Insecta
- Order: Coleoptera
- Suborder: Polyphaga
- Infraorder: Elateriformia
- Family: Elateridae
- Genus: Lacon
- Species: L. punctatus

Binomial name
- Lacon punctatus (Herbst, 1779)

= Lacon punctatus =

Species of beetle

Lacon punctatus is a species of click beetle belonging to the family Elateridae subfamily Agrypninae.A group of insects having all the ability to escape from predators by making fast movements by folding themselves with their muscles and jumping out of reach.Similar to the Grasshoppers to escape from predators.

== Description ==
Lacon punctatuss can reach a length of 13–21 millimetres (0.51–0.83 in). Body is black and flat, covered with hair and with small white spots (hence the Latin name punctatus) caused by white scales. Both adults and larvae can be found in the old fallen logs and under bark of decaying trees, with a preference for conifers, especially Pinus species. Apparently these beetles often coexist with ants. Adults are nocturnal and are present throughout the year.

The larvae are cylindrical and elongated, with three pairs of legs. They have the forepart of the body reddish brown, strongly sclerotized, while the abdomen is white and fleshy. They are active predators feeding on larvae and nymphs of many different other insects living in rotten wood (mainly larvae of Stictoleptura rubra).

== Distribution and habitat ==
This species can be found in the Mediterranean countries, in Central Europe, the Western Europe, the Caucasus, Crimea, in the Near East and in North Africa.
