= Calais speciosus =

Scientific classification
- Domain: Eukaryota
- Kingdom: Animalia
- Phylum: Arthropoda
- Class: Insecta
- Order: Coleoptera
- Suborder: Polyphaga
- Infraorder: Elateriformia
- Family: Elateridae
- Subfamily: Agrypninae
- Genus: Calais
- Species: C. speciosus

Binomial name
- Calais speciosus (Linnaeus, 1767)

Synonyms
- Elater speciosus Linnaeus, 1767; Alaus speciosus (Linnaeus, 1767)

Species of beetle

Calais speciosus is a species of click beetle in the genus Calais.

== Biocontrol use ==
In Hawaii and in Asia where there are coconut rhinoceros beetles (Oryctes rhinoceros), Calais speciosus has been introduced to control their population, as it may eat the grubs or eggs of Oryctes rhinoceros.
