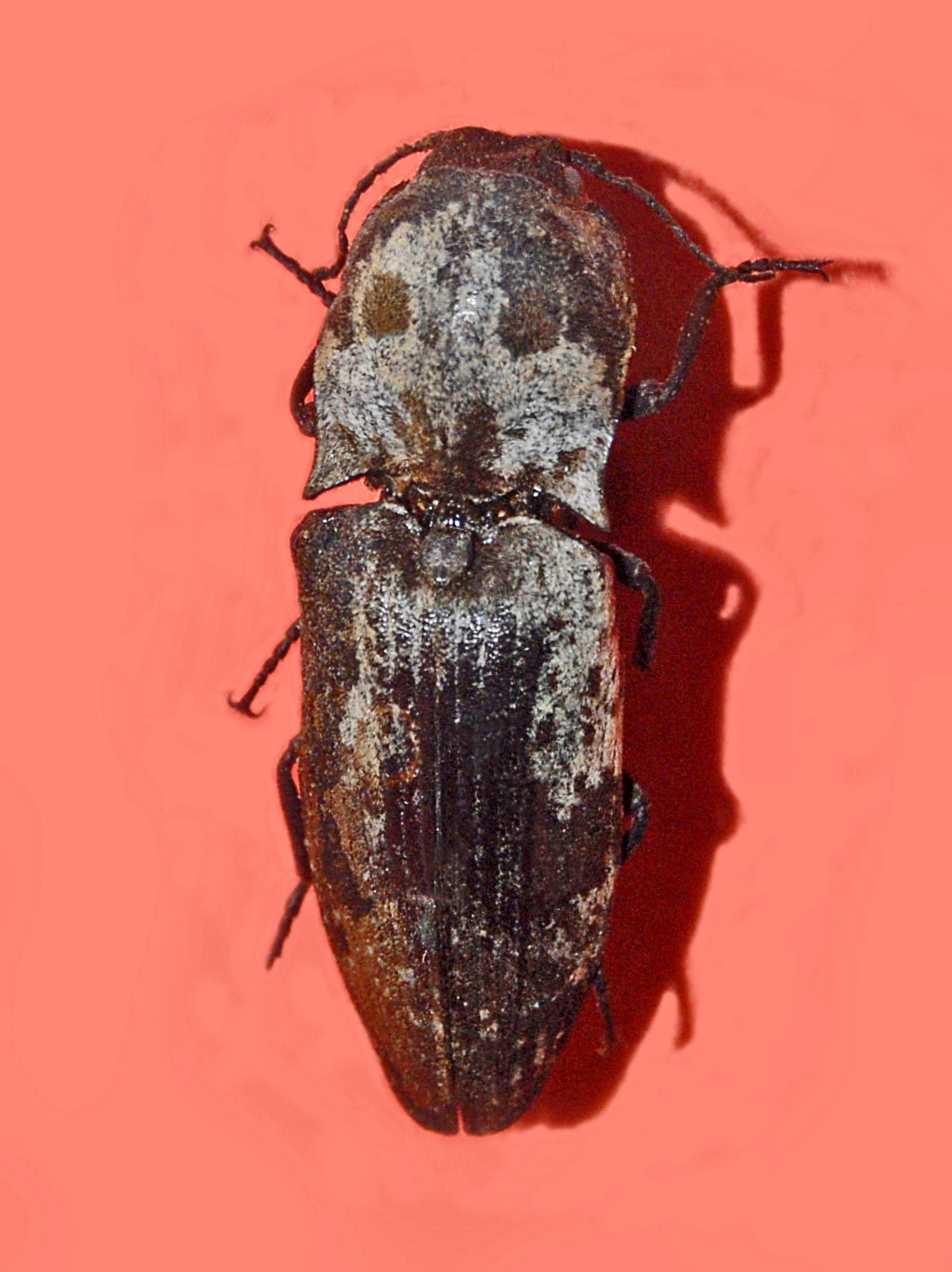
- Museum specimen of Calais parreysii

Scientific classification
- Kingdom: Animalia
- Phylum: Arthropoda
- Class: Insecta
- Order: Coleoptera
- Suborder: Polyphaga
- Infraorder: Elateriformia
- Family: Elateridae
- Subfamily: Agrypninae
- Genus: Calais
- Species: C. parreysii

Binomial name
- Calais parreysii (Steven, 1829)

Synonyms
- Alaus parreyssi Steven, 1830

= Calais parreysii =

Species of beetle

Calais parreysii is a species of click beetle belonging to the family Elateridae subfamily Agrypninae.

== Description ==
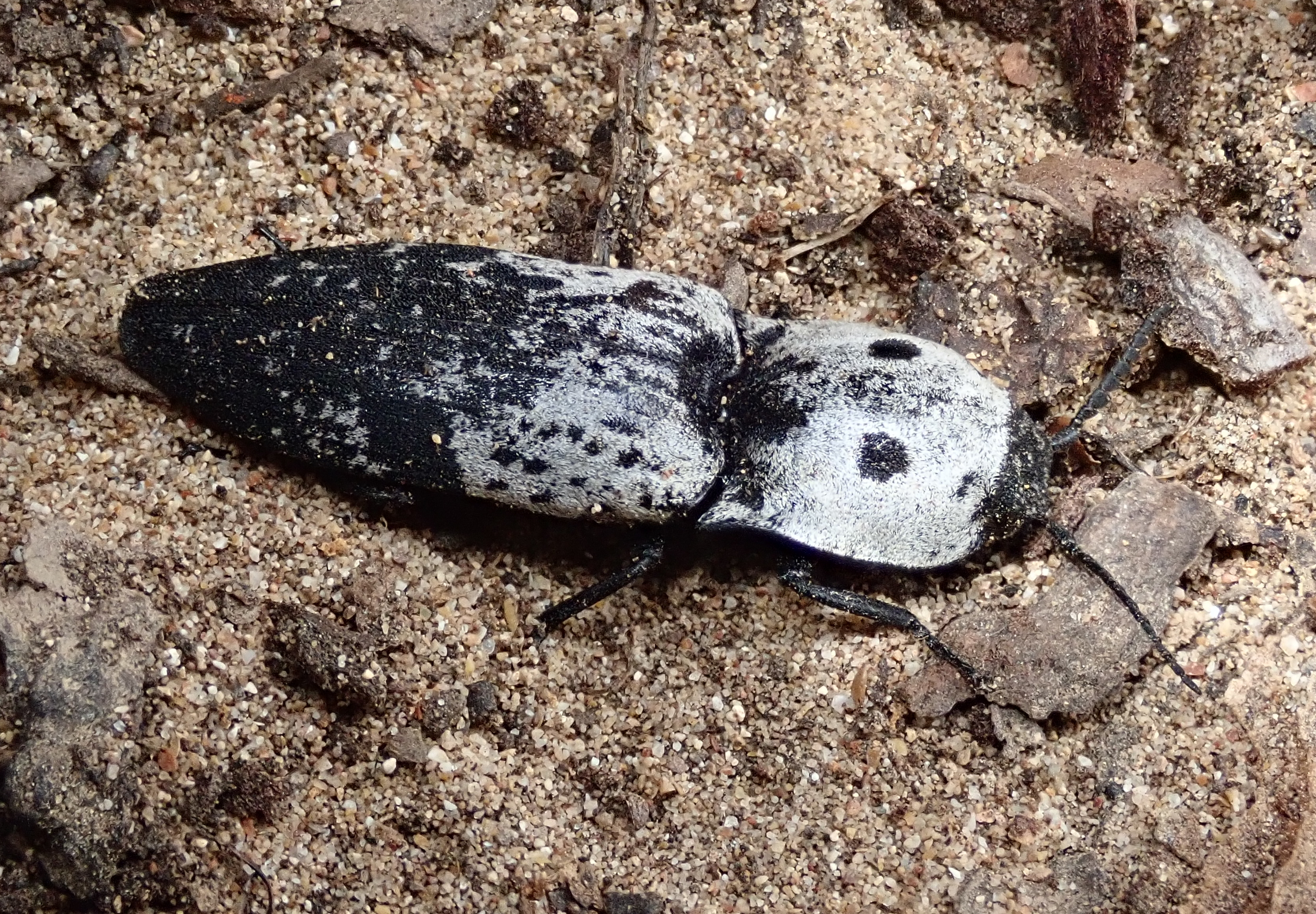
Calais parreysii, Kotychi, Greece

Calais parreysii can reach a length of 30–40 millimetres (1.2–1.6 in). Body is black, elongate and covered with thick white and black scales forming a variegated pattern. Pronotum shows two small black spots. Adults fly from late May to early June. The larvae develop in the wood of the old rotten fallen trees, especially pines (Pinus pallasiana, Pinus brutia, Pinus halepensis). Larvae are active predators feeding on insects living in rotten wood.

== Distribution and habitat ==
This species s widespread from the Balkan Peninsula to Central-Western Asia and the Near East (Greece, Cyprus, Syria, Turkey, Iran and Russia). It lives in the pine forests and in the thickets in moist areas.
