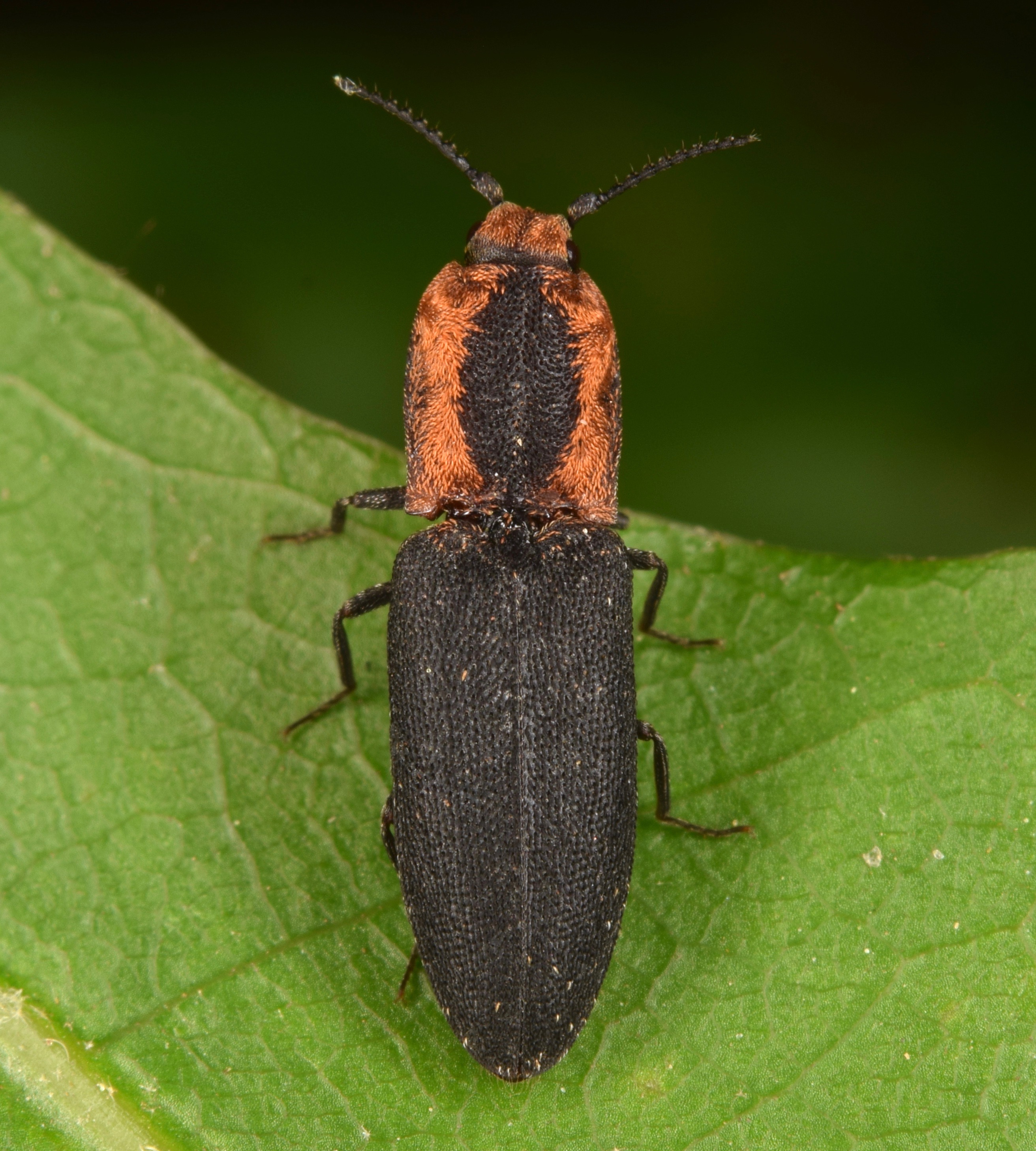

Scientific classification
- Domain: Eukaryota
- Kingdom: Animalia
- Phylum: Arthropoda
- Class: Insecta
- Order: Coleoptera
- Suborder: Polyphaga
- Infraorder: Elateriformia
- Family: Elateridae
- Subfamily: Agrypninae
- Genus: Lacon
- Species: L. discoideus

Binomial name
- Lacon discoideus (Weber, 1801)

Synonyms
- Elater discoideus Weber, 1801

= Lacon discoideus =

Species of beetle

Lacon discoideus is a species of click beetle native to eastern North America.
