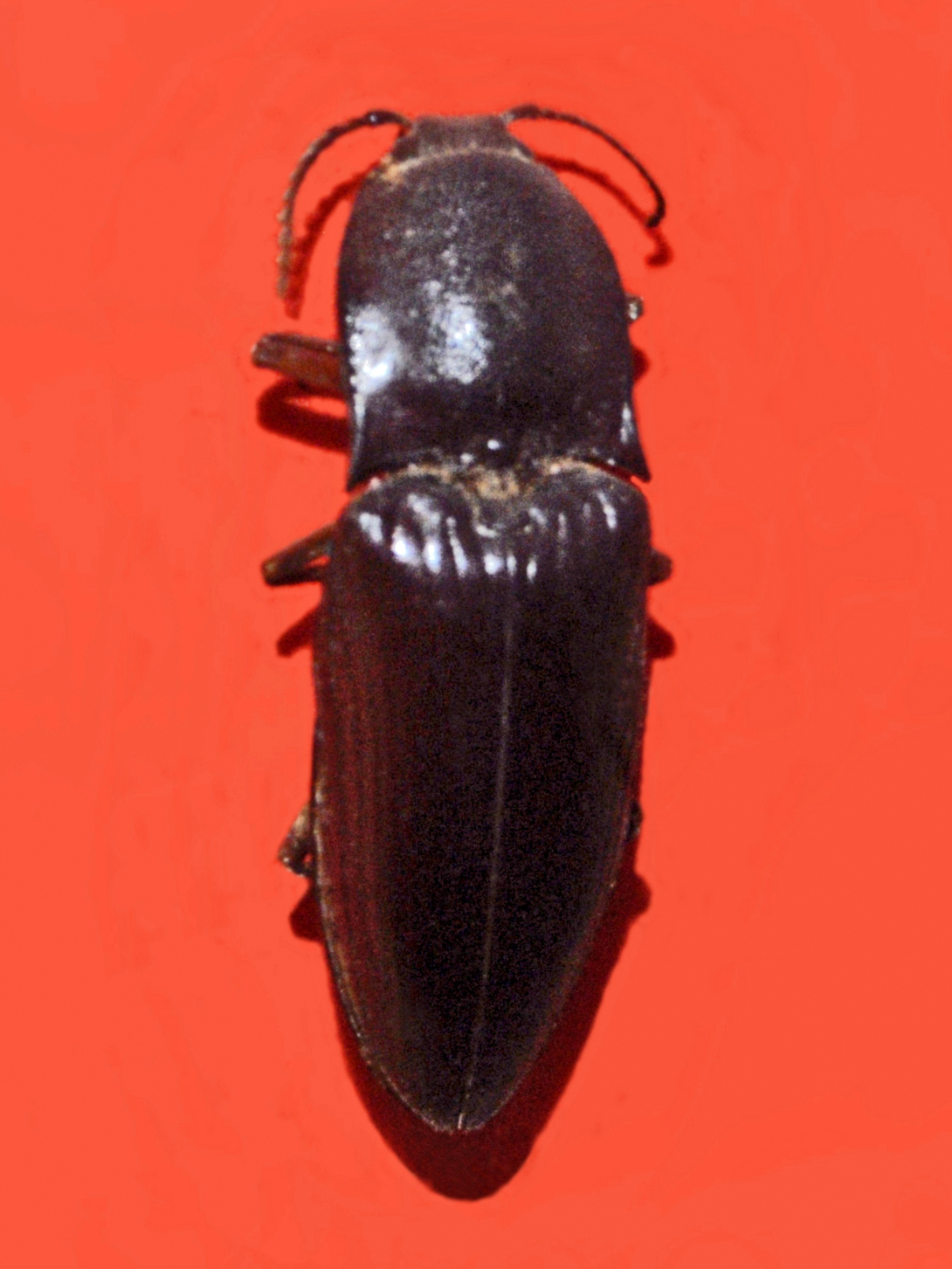
- Museum specimen of Lanelater fuscipes

Scientific classification
- Kingdom: Animalia
- Phylum: Arthropoda
- Class: Insecta
- Order: Coleoptera
- Suborder: Polyphaga
- Infraorder: Elateriformia
- Family: Elateridae
- Genus: Lanelater
- Species: L. fuscipes

Binomial name
- Lanelater fuscipes (Fabricius, 1775)

Synonyms
- Agrypnus fuscipes Fleautiaux, 1922; Elater fuscipes Fabricius, 1775

= Lanelater fuscipes =

Species of beetle

Lanelater fuscipes is a species of click beetle belonging to the family Elateridae subfamily Agrypninae.

== Description ==
Lanelater fuscipes can reach a length of 33 millimetres (1.3 in). These large click beetles have a dark brown body. Usually they show a puncturation of the pronotum and an evident striation of the elytra, but the species is quite variable, especially in the length and in degree of convexity of the prothorax. Its larvae live in the coconut palms.

== Distribution ==
This species can be found in Madagascar, Réunion, Sri Lanka, India and Indochina.
