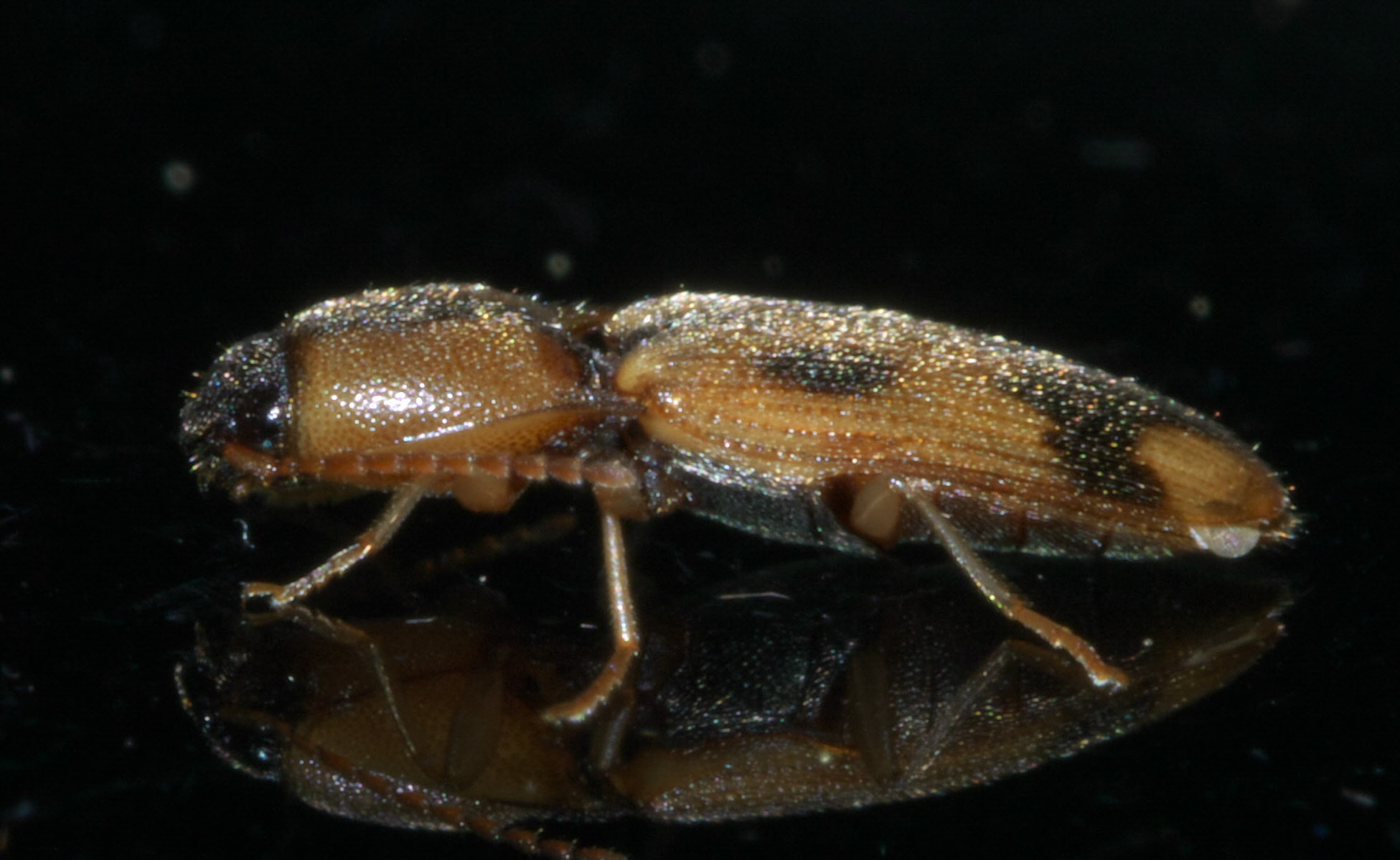
- Aeolus sp.

Scientific classification
- Kingdom: Animalia
- Phylum: Arthropoda
- Class: Insecta
- Order: Coleoptera
- Suborder: Polyphaga
- Infraorder: Elateriformia
- Family: Elateridae
- Subfamily: Agrypninae
- Tribe: Oophorini
- Genus: Aeolus; Eschscholtz, 1829

Diversity
- About 15 species

= Aeolus (beetle) =

Genus of beetles

Aeolus is a genus of click beetles in the family Elateridae. There are about 15 described species in Aeolus, found on all continents except Oceania.

== See also ==
- List of Aeolus species
