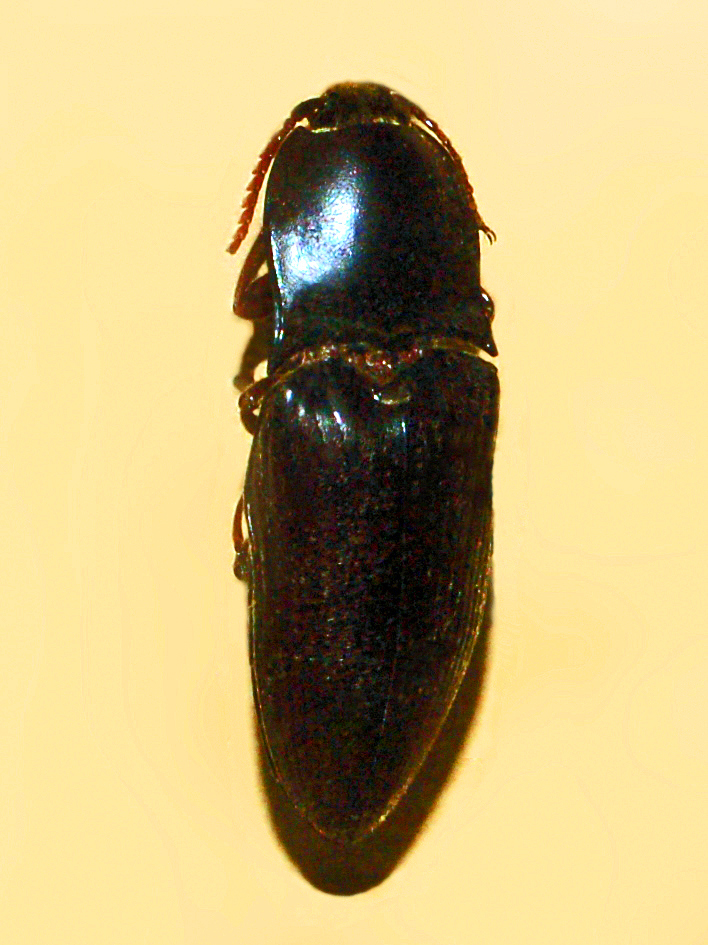
- Lanelater substriatus from São Tomé Island. Mounted specimen.

Scientific classification
- Kingdom: Animalia
- Phylum: Arthropoda
- Class: Insecta
- Order: Coleoptera
- Suborder: Polyphaga
- Infraorder: Elateriformia
- Family: Elateridae
- Genus: Lanelater
- Species: L. substriatus

Binomial name
- Lanelater substriatus (Candèze, 1857)

Synonyms
- Agrypnus substriatus Candèze, 1857; Agrypnus extractus Fleutiaux, 1902; Agrypnus extractus var striatus Fleutiaux, 1902

= Lanelater substriatus =

Species of beetle

Lanelater substriatus is a species of click beetle belonging to the family Elateridae.

== Description ==
Lanelater substriatus can reach a length of 30–35 millimetres (1.2–1.4 in).

== Distribution ==
This species can be found in Sierra Leone, Senegal, Guinea, Democratic Republic of Congo and São Tomé Island.
