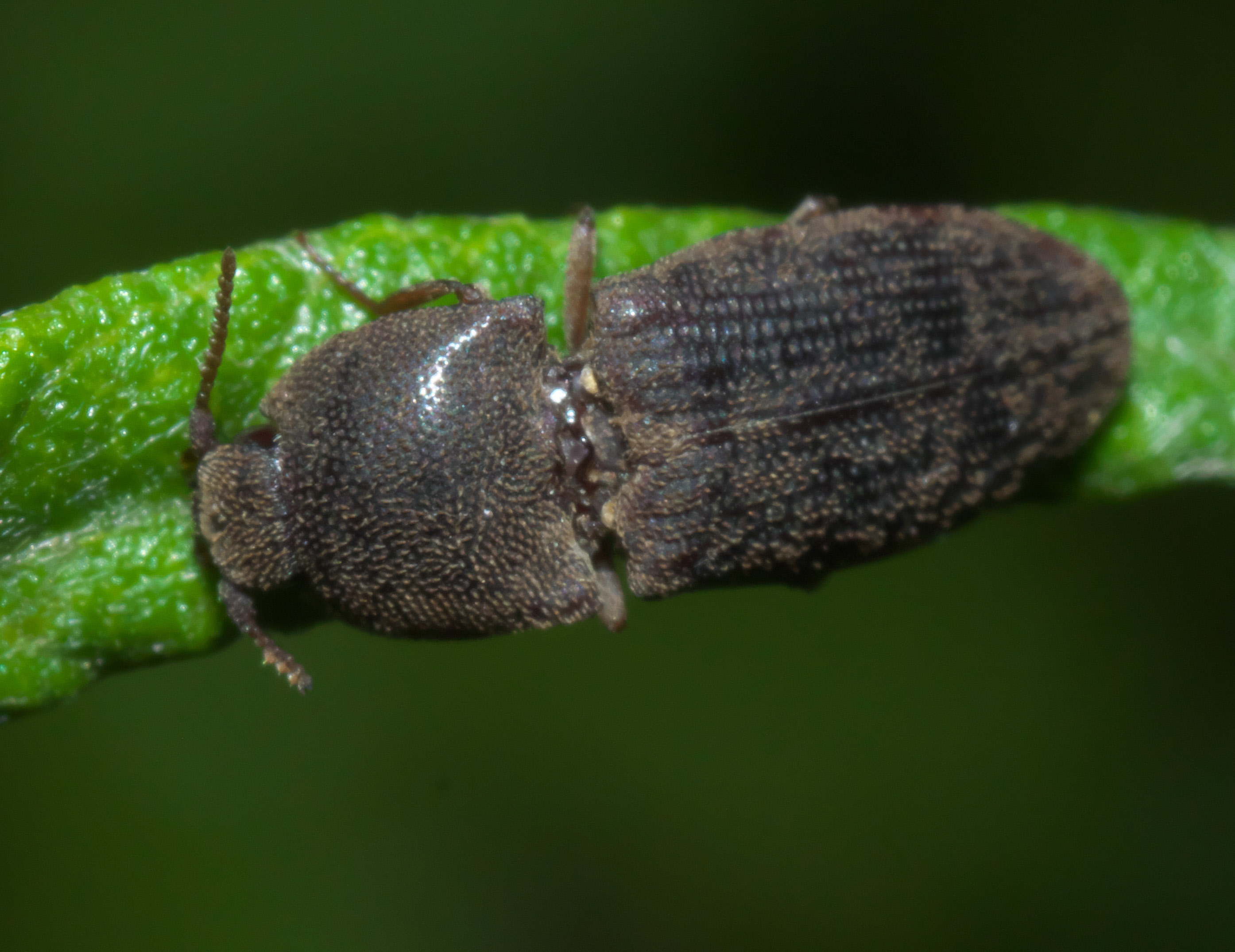
- Agrypnus rectangularis

Scientific classification
- Kingdom: Animalia
- Phylum: Arthropoda
- Class: Insecta
- Order: Coleoptera
- Suborder: Polyphaga
- Infraorder: Elateriformia
- Family: Elateridae
- Subfamily: Agrypninae; Candèze, 1857

Tribes
- Agrypnini Candèze, 1857; Anaissini Golbach, 1984; Drilini Blanchard, 1845; Euplinthini Johnson, 2011; Hemirhipini Candèze, 1857; Oophorini Gistel, 1848; Platycrepidiini Costa and Casari-Chen, 1993; Pseudomelanactini Arnett, 1967; Pyrophorini Candèze, 1863; † Cryptocardiini Dolin, 1980

= Agrypninae =

Subfamily of beetles

Agrypninae is a subfamily of click beetles in the family Elateridae. There are at least 130 genera and more than 430 described species within Agrypninae.

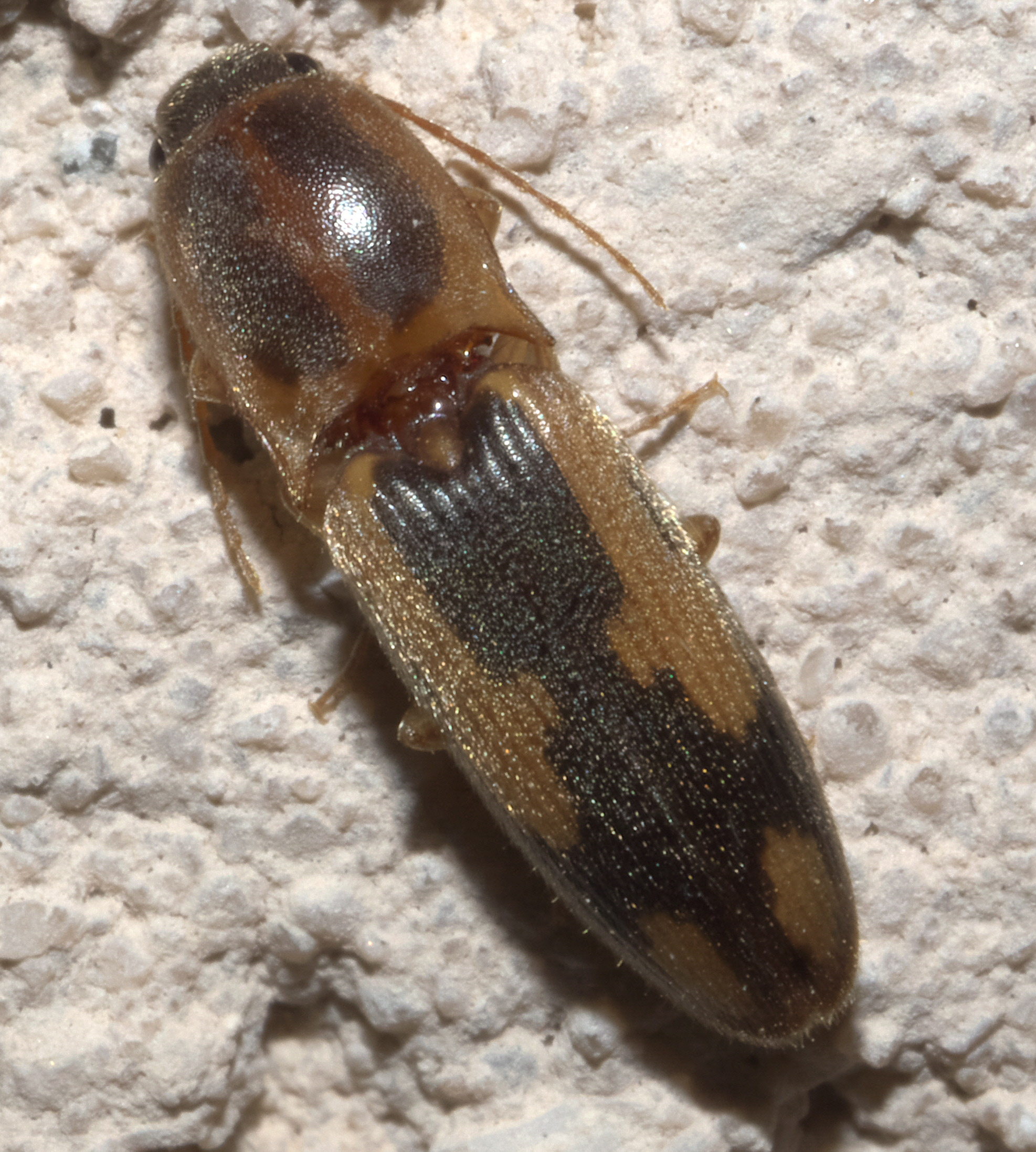
Conoderus vespertinus

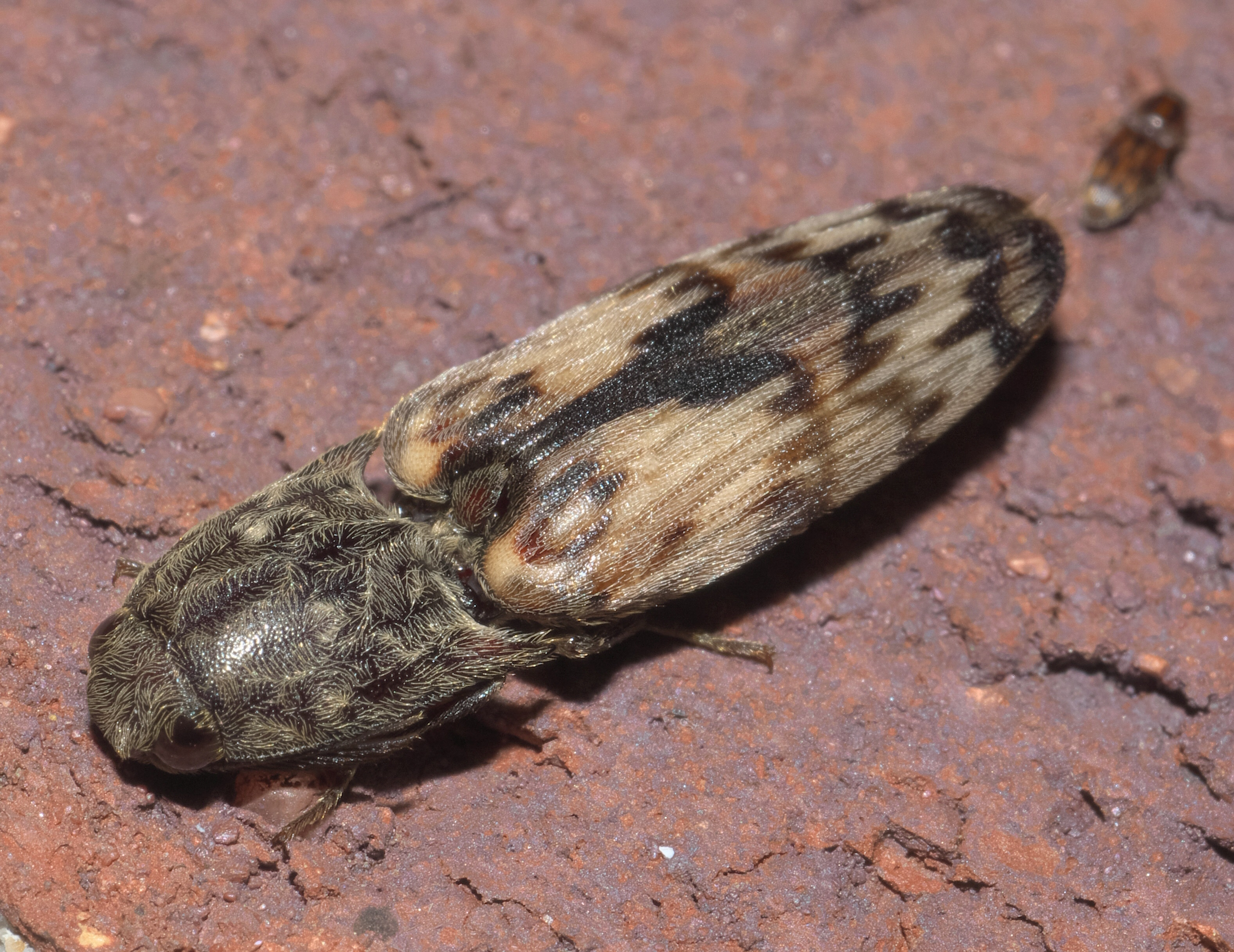
Pherhimius fascicularis

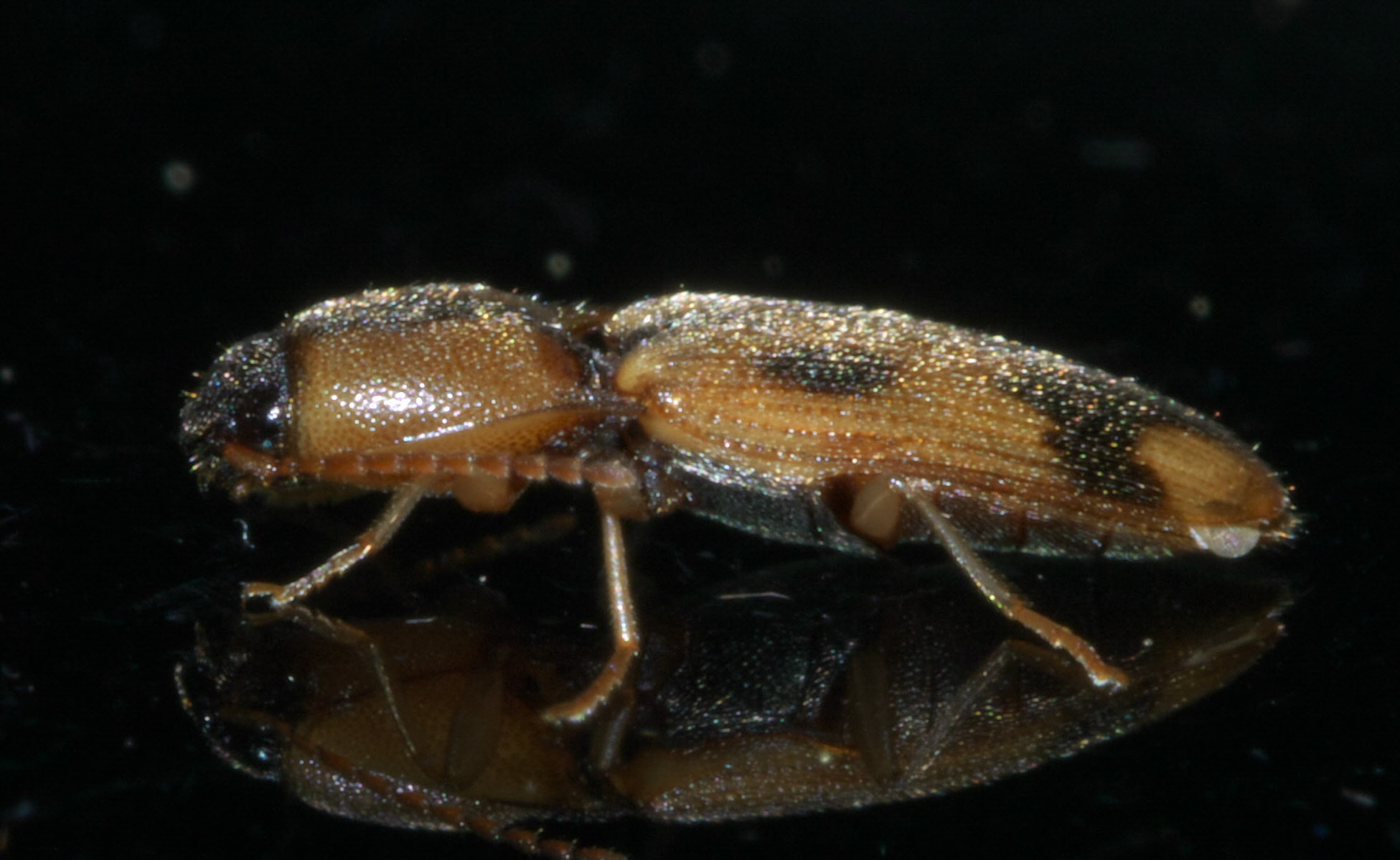
Aeolus

== Genera ==
These genera are members of the subfamily Agrypninae:

- Acrocryptus Candèze, 1874
- Adelocera Latreille, 1829
- Aeoloderma Fleutiaux, 1928
- Aeoloides Schwarz, 1906
- Aeolosomus Dolin, 1982
- Aeolus Eschscholtz, 1829
- Agnostelater Costa, 1975
- Agraeus Candèze, 1857
- Agrypnus Eschscholtz, 1829
- Alampoides Schwarz, 1906
- Alaolacon Candèze, 1865
- Alaomorphus Hauser, 1900
- Alaus Eschscholtz, 1829
- Aliteus Candèze, 1857
- Anaissus Candèze, 1857
- Anathesis Candèze, 1865
- Anthracalaus Fairmaire, 1889
- Antitypus Candèze, 1882
- Aphileus Candèze, 1857
- Apochresis Candèze, 1882
- Arcanelater Costa, 1975
- Austrocalais Neboiss, 1967
- Babadrasterius Ôhira, 1994
- Calais Laporte, 1838
- Candanius Hayek, 1973
- Carlota Arias-Bohart, 2014
- Catelanus Fleutiaux, 1942
- Chalcolepidinus Pjatakowa, 1941
- Chalcolepidius Eschscholtz, 1829
- Chalcolepis Candèze, 1857
- Christinea Gurjeva, 1987
- Chrostus Candèze, 1878
- Cleidecosta Johnson, 2002
- Coctilelater Costa, 1975
- Collisarius Schimmel & Tarnawski, 2012
- Compresselater Platia & Gudenzi, 2006
- Compsolacon Reitter, 1905
- Compsoplinthus Costa, 1975
- Conobajulus Van Zwaluwenburg, 1940
- Coryleus Fleutiaux, 1942
- Cryptalaus Ôhira, 1967
- Cryptolampros Costa, 1975
- Cuneateus Schimmel & Tarnawski, 2012
- Danosoma C.G.Thompson, 1859
- Deilelater Costa, 1975 (glowing click beetles)
- Deronocus Johnson, 1997
- Dilobitarsus Latreille, 1834
- Dorygonus Candèze, 1859
- Drasterius Eschscholtz, 1829
- Drilus Olivier, 1790
- Eidolus Candèze, 1857
- Elasmosomus Schwarz, 1902
- Euphemus Laporte, 1838
- Euplinthus Costa, 1975
- Flabelloselasia Kundrata & Bocak, 2017
- Fulgeochlizus Costa, 1975
- Fusimorphus Fleutiaux, 1942
- Gahanus Platia, 2012
- Grammephorus Solier, 1851
- Hapsodrilus Costa, 1975
- Hartenius Platia, 2007
- Hemicleus Candèze, 1857
- Hemirhipus Latreille, 1825
- Heteroderes Latreille, 1834
- Hifo Candèze, 1882
- Hifoides Schwarz, 1906
- Hypsiophthalmus Latreille, 1834
- Ignelater Costa, 1975
- Kupeselasia Kundrata & Bocak, 2017
- Lacon Laporte, 1838
- Lanelater Arnett, 1952
- Lobotarsus Schwarz, 1898
- Lolosia Kundrata & Bocak, 2017
- Ludioctenus Fairmaire, 1893
- Lycoreus Candèze, 1857
- Lygelater Costa, 1975
- Macromalocera Hope, 1834
- Malacogaster Bassi, 1834
- Melanthoides Candèze, 1865
- Meristhus Candèze, 1857
- Meroplinthus Candèze, 1891
- Metapyrophorus Rosa & Costa, 2009
- Microselasia Kundrata & Bocak, 2017
- Mocquerysia Fleutiaux, 1899
- Monocrepidius Eschscholtz, 1829
- Nanseia Kishii, 1985
- Neocalais Girard, 1971
- Neodrasterius Kishii, 1996
- Nipponodrasterius Kishii, 1966
- Noxlumenes Costa, 1975
- Nycterilampus Montrouzier, 1860
- Nyctophyxis Costa, 1975
- Octocryptus Candèze, 1892
- Opselater Costa, 1975
- Optaleus Candèze, 1857
- Pachyderes Guérin-Méneville, 1829
- Paraheteroderes Girard, 2017
- Paraphileus Candèze, 1882
- Peralampes Johnson, 2002
- Phanophorus Solier, 1851
- Phedomenus Candèze, 1889
- Pherhimius Fleutiaux, 1942
- Phertetrigus Schimmel & Tarnawski, 2012
- Phibisa Fleutiaux, 1942
- Photophorus Candèze, 1863
- Platianellus Schimmel & Tarnawski, 2012
- Platycrepidius Candèze, 1859
- Propalaus Casari, 2008
- Pseudaeolus Candèze, 1891
- Pseudocalais Girard, 1971
- Ptesimopsia Costa, 1975
- Punctodensus Patwardhan, Schimmel & Athalye, 2009
- Pyrearinus Costa, 1975
- Pyrischius Hyslop, 1921
- Pyrophorus Billberg, 1820
- Pyroptesis Costa, 1975
- Rismethus Fleutiaux, 1947
- Saltamartinus Casari, 1996
- Saudilacon Chassain, 1983
- Scaphoderus Candèze, 1857
- Selasia Laporte, 1838
- Sooporanga Costa, 1975
- Stangellus Golbach, 1975
- Sulcilacon Fleutiaux, 1927
- Telesus Candèze, 1880
- Tetrigus Candèze, 1857
- Thoramus Sharp, 1877
- Trieres Candèze, 1900
- Vesperelater Costa, 1975
- Wittmerselasia Kundrata & Bocak, 2017
