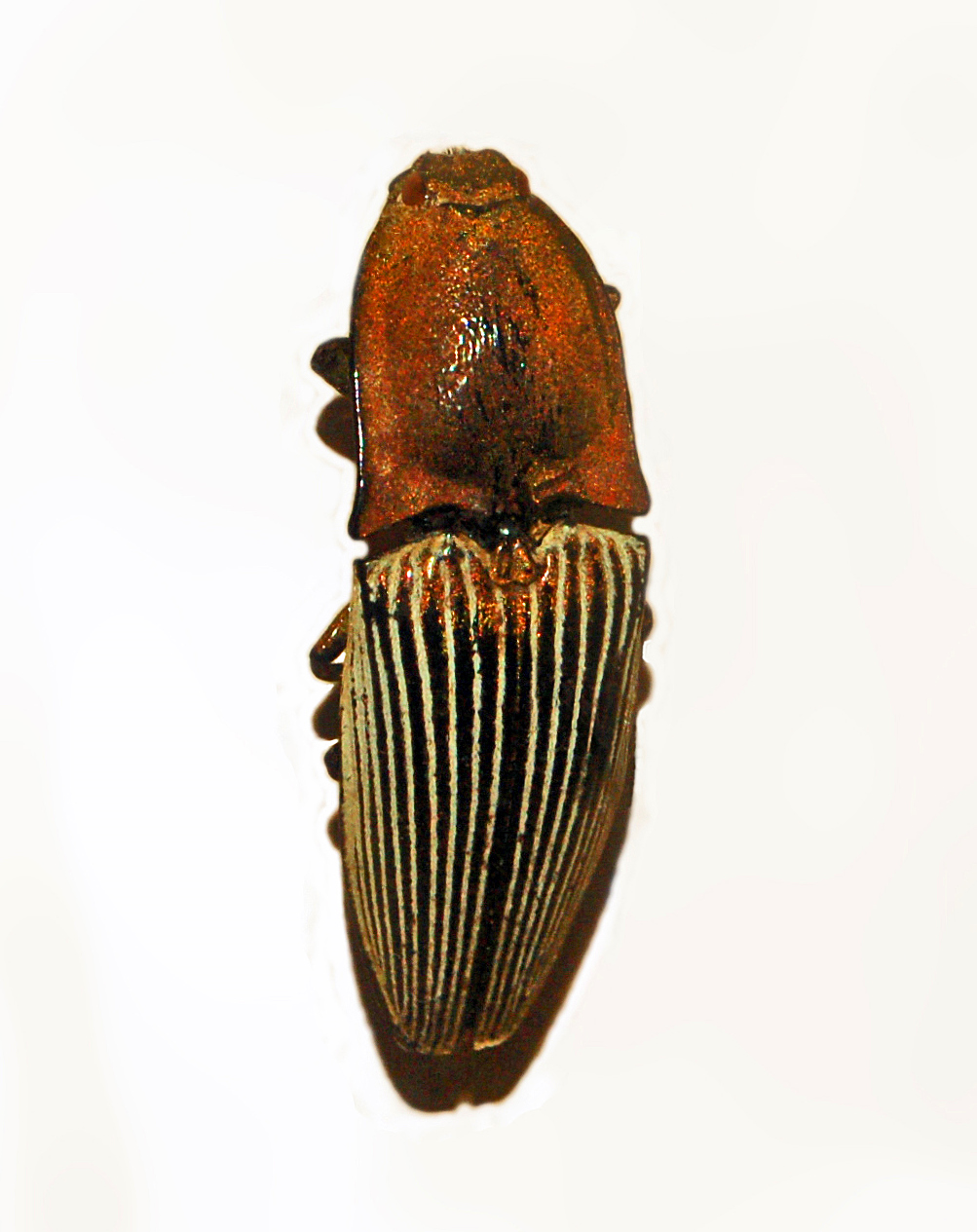
- Chalcolepidius porcatus from Bolivia

Scientific classification
- Kingdom: Animalia
- Phylum: Arthropoda
- Clade: Pancrustacea
- Class: Insecta
- Order: Coleoptera
- Suborder: Polyphaga
- Infraorder: Elateriformia
- Family: Elateridae
- Genus: Chalcolepidius
- Species: C. porcatus

Binomial name
- Chalcolepidius porcatus (Linnaeus 1767)

Synonyms
- Chalcolepidius flavostriatus Pjatakowa, 1941; Chalcolepidius herbstii multistriatus Golbach, 1977; Chalcolepidius peruanus Candèze, 1886; Elater porcatus Linnaeus, 1767

= Chalcolepidius porcatus =

Species of beetle

Chalcolepidius porcatus is a species of beetles in the family Elateridae.

== Description ==
Chalcolepidius porcatus reaches a length of about 38 millimetres (1.5 in). The coloration may be green, yellowish-green or brown, with striated pronotum.

== Distribution ==
This species occurs in Peru, Colombia, Bolivia.
