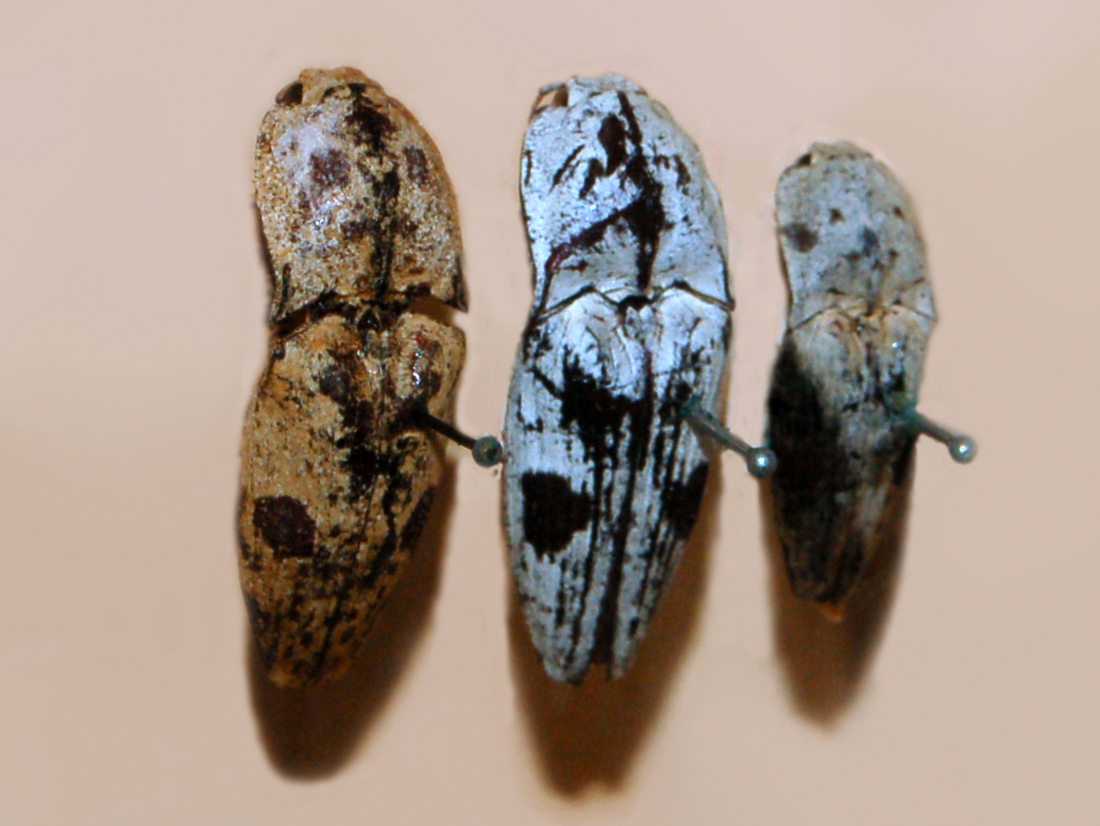

Scientific classification
- Kingdom: Animalia
- Phylum: Arthropoda
- Clade: Pancrustacea
- Class: Insecta
- Order: Coleoptera
- Suborder: Polyphaga
- Infraorder: Elateriformia
- Family: Elateridae
- Genus: Cryptalaus
- Species: C. lacteus

Binomial name
- Cryptalaus lacteus (Candeze, 1857)

Synonyms
- *Alaus lacteus (Candeze, 1857)

= Cryptalaus lacteus =

Species of beetle

Cryptalaus lacteus is a species of click beetle belonging to the family Elateridae. It is only present in South-East Asia including Indo-China, Malay, Sumatra, Philippines and Borneo.
