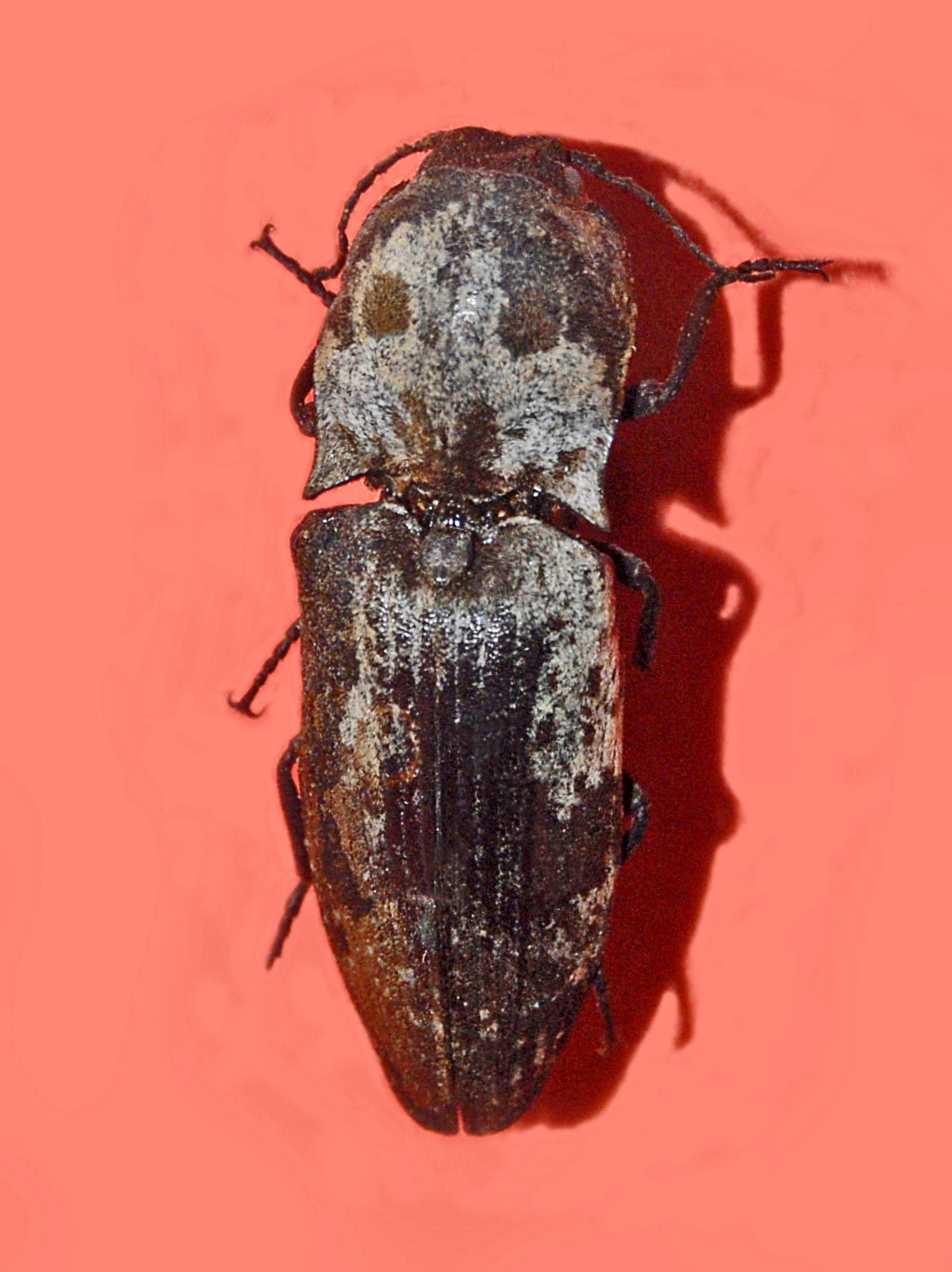
- Museum specimen of Calais parreysii

Scientific classification
- Domain: Eukaryota
- Kingdom: Animalia
- Phylum: Arthropoda
- Class: Insecta
- Order: Coleoptera
- Suborder: Polyphaga
- Infraorder: Elateriformia
- Family: Elateridae
- Subfamily: Agrypninae
- Tribe: Hemirhipini
- Genus: Calais; Laporte, 1838

= Calais (beetle) =

Genus of beetles

Calais is a genus of click beetle belonging to the family Elateridae and the subfamily Agrypninae.

== Species ==
- Calais afghanicus Chassain, 1991
- Calais albidus Fleutiaux
- Calais allardi Girard, 2007
- Calais amieti Girard, 1967
- Calais angustus (Schwarz, 1899)
- Calais antinorii (Candèze, 1889)
- Calais atropos Gerstaeker
- Calais bicarinatus (Quedenfeldt, 1886)
- Calais biocellatus (Fleutiaux, 1919)
- Calais brandti Platia & Gudenzi, 1999
- Calais camerounensis Girard, 1992
- Calais candezei (Murray, 1868)
- Calais carayoni Girard, 1967
- Calais catei Girard, 2008
- Calais centrafricanus Girard, 2004
- Calais cerberus (Candeze, 1874)
- Calais chalcolepidinus (Fairmaire, 1892)
- Calais congoensis Girard, 1968
- Calais crokisii (Candeze, 1882)
- Calais crucifer (Candèze, 1889)
- Calais dohrni (Candeze, 1882)
- Calais excavatus (Fabricius, 1801)
- Calais famulus (Candèze, 1897)
- Calais gabonensis Girard, 1992
- Calais gerstaeckeri Fleutiaux
- Calais hacquardi Candeze
- Calais hayekae Girard, 1968
- Calais hieroglyphicus Candèze, 1857
- Calais intermedius Duvivier
- Calais interruptus Hope
- Calais jarrigei Girard, 1968
- Calais josensi Girard, 1971
- Calais lalannei Girard, 1968
- Calais lecordieri Girard, 1968
- Calais levasseuri Girard, 1968
- Calais longipennis Schwarz
- Calais macari (Candèze, 1889)
- Calais mahenus (Fairmaire, 1892)
- Calais marmoratus (Candeze)
- Calais mniszechi (Candeze)
- Calais nigromaculatus (Schwarz, 1905)
- Calais nigrsignatus (Quedenfeldt)
- Calais orientalis Girard, 1968
- Calais parallelus (Candèze, 1896)
- Calais parreysii (Steven, 1829)
- Calais pectinatus (Fairmaire, 1897)
- Calais pectinicornis (Schwarz, 1908)
- Calais persicus Chassain, 1991
- Calais polyzonus (Gerstaeker)
- Calais proximus Girard, 2007
- Calais pulvereus (Candèze, 1897)
- Calais revoili (Fairmaire, 1887)
- Calais rochebrunei (Fairmaire, 1891)
- Calais rotundimaculatus (Schwarz, 1905)
- Calais rudis (Candeze)
- Calais ruteri Girard, 1968
- Calais schneideri (Schwarz, 1908)
- Calais scotti (Fleutiaux, 1922)
- Calais senegalensis Laporte, 1838
- Calais similis Girard, 1992
- Calais sinuosicollis (Laporte)
- Calais sjostedti (Schwarz, 1903)
- Calais speciosus (Linnaeus, 1767)
- Calais stellio (Candèze, 1889)
- Calais subrecticollis (Fleutiaux)
- Calais sulcicollis (Gahan, 1900)
- Calais tigrinus (Schwarz, 1905)
- Calais tortrix (Candèze) - Harlequin click beetle
- Calais trifasciatus (Gahan, 1909)
- Calais tristis (Candèze, 1889)
- Calais venustus Girard, 1992
- Calais wittmeri Chassain, 1983
