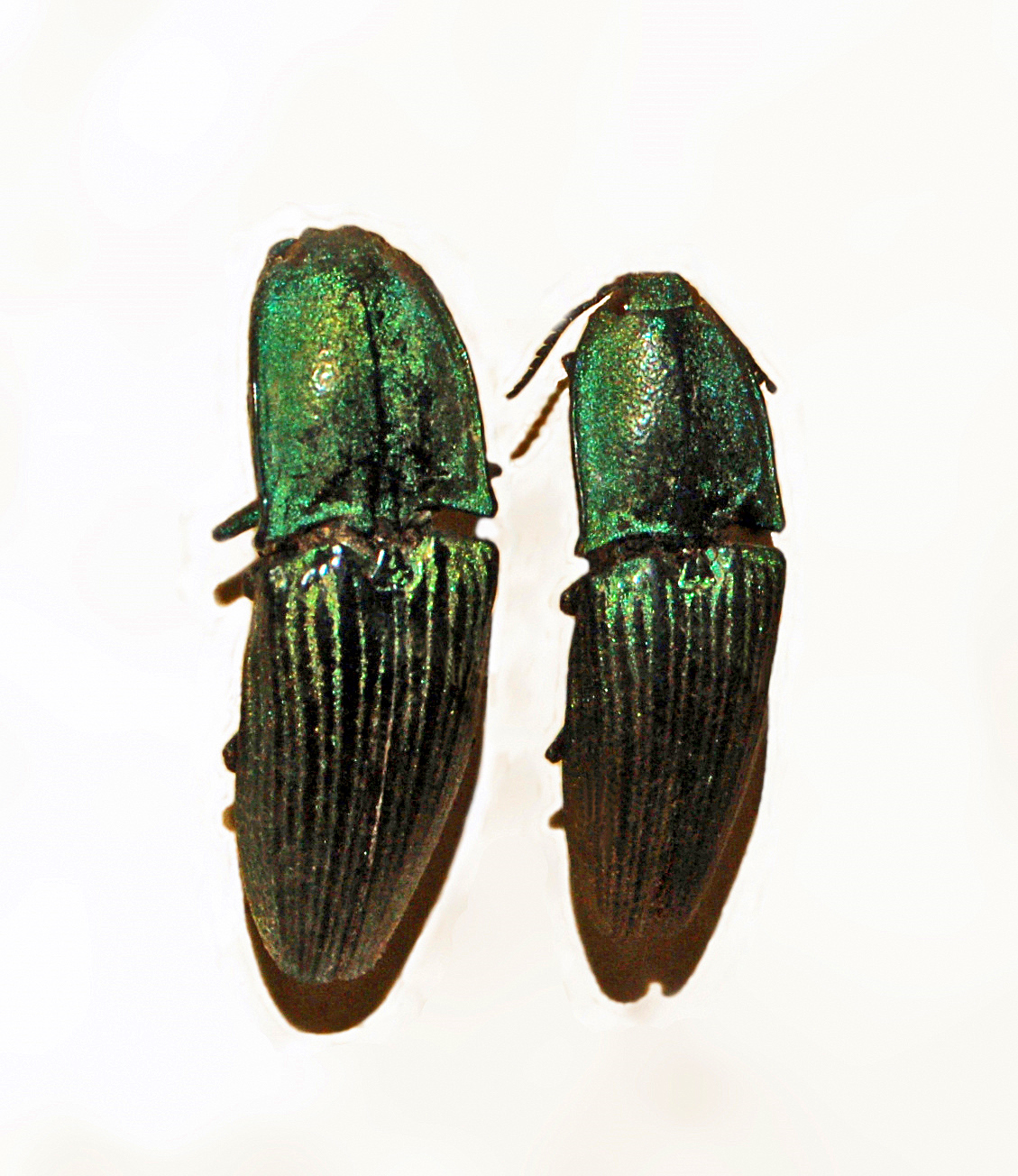
- Chalcolepidius virens from Venezuela

Scientific classification
- Kingdom: Animalia
- Phylum: Arthropoda
- Class: Insecta
- Order: Coleoptera
- Suborder: Polyphaga
- Infraorder: Elateriformia
- Family: Elateridae
- Genus: Chalcolepidius
- Species: C. virens

Binomial name
- Chalcolepidius virens (Fabricius, 1787)

Synonyms
- Chalcolepidius perrisi Candèze, 1857; Chalcolepidius porcatus var. virens

= Chalcolepidius virens =

Species of beetle

Chalcolepidius virens is a species of beetles in the family Elateridae.

== Description ==
Chalcolepidius virens reaches about 22–44 millimetres (0.87–1.73 in) in length. The coloration may be green, blue, brown, or violet.

== Distribution ==
This species occurs in Venezuela, Bolivia, Panama, and Ecuador, and it is widespread in Antilles.
