= Anaissini =

Scientific classification
- Kingdom: Animalia
- Phylum: Arthropoda
- Clade: Pancrustacea
- Class: Insecta
- Order: Coleoptera
- Suborder: Polyphaga
- Infraorder: Elateriformia
- Family: Elateridae
- Subfamily: Agrypninae
- Tribe: Anaissini; Golbach, 1984

Tribe of beetles

Anaissini is a tribe of click beetles in the family Elateridae.

== Genera ==
- Agnostelater Costa, 1975
- Alampoides Schwarz, 1906
- Anaissus Candèze, 1857
- Coctilelater Costa, 1975
- Peralampes Johnson, 2002
