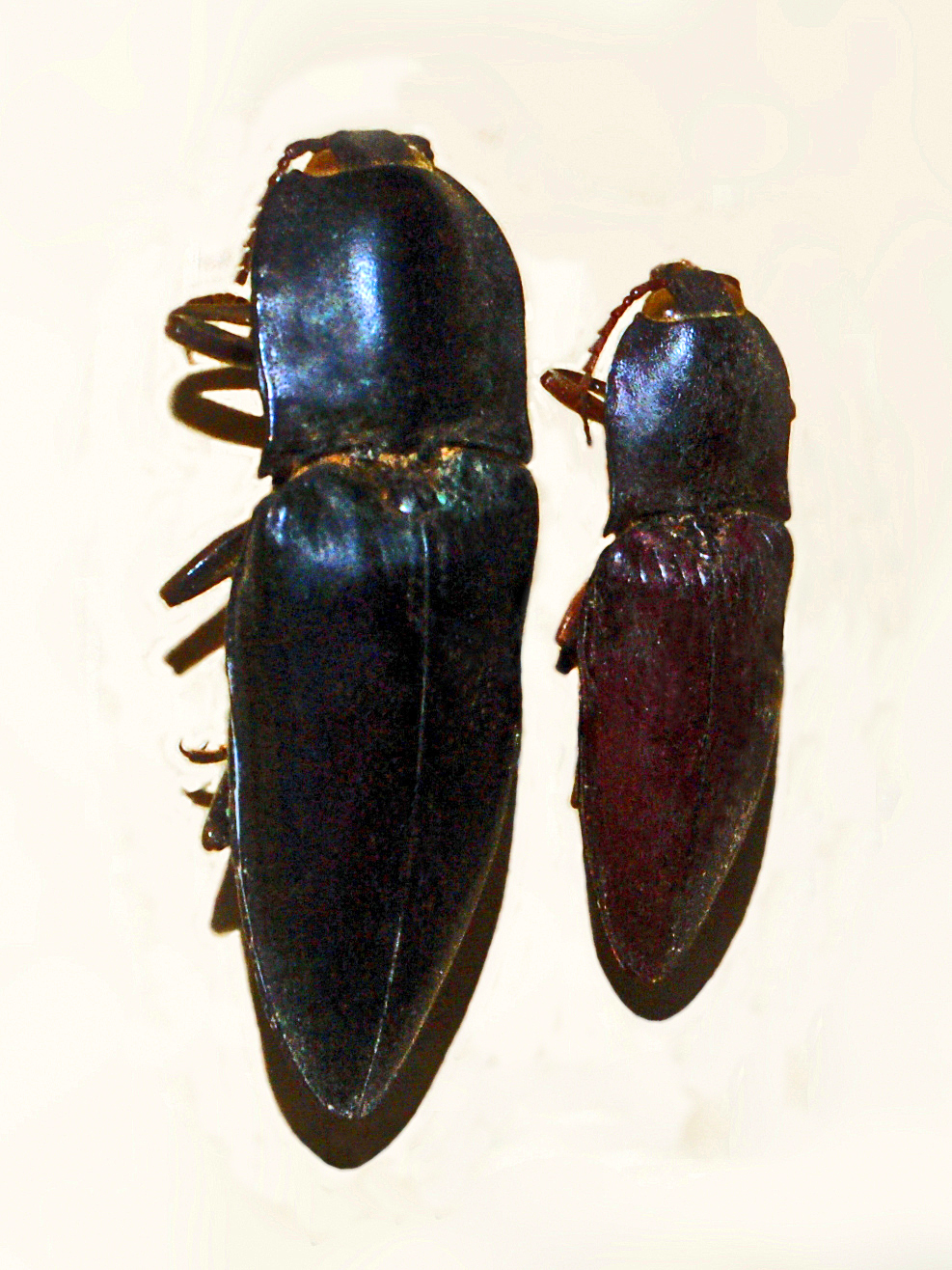
- Lanelater mastersii. Mounted specimen

Scientific classification
- Kingdom: Animalia
- Phylum: Arthropoda
- Class: Insecta
- Order: Coleoptera
- Suborder: Polyphaga
- Infraorder: Elateriformia
- Family: Elateridae
- Subfamily: Agrypninae
- Tribe: Pseudomelanactini
- Genus: Lanelater; Arnett, 1952

= Lanelater =

Genus of beetles

Lanelater is a genus of click beetle belonging to the family Elateridae.

== List of species ==
- Lanelater acuminatus (Fleutiaux, 1935)
- Lanelater aequalis (Candèze, 1857)
- Lanelater afoveatus Vats & Kashyap, 1993
- Lanelater arabicus (Candèze, 1874)
- Lanelater arenarum Platia & Schimmel, 1997
- Lanelater attenuatus (Candèze, 1874)
- Lanelater australis (Candèze, 1874)
- Lanelater babaulti (Fleutiaux, 1918)
- Lanelater badeni (Candèze, 1889)
- Lanelater bartoni (Fleutiaux, 1902)
- Lanelater bifoveatus (Candèze, 1857)
- Lanelater bipunctatus (Candèze, 1857)
- Lanelater bradshawi (Candèze, 1889)
- Lanelater buettikeri Chassain, 1983
- Lanelater capensis Girard, 2008
- Lanelater cinereus (Candèze, 1857)
- Lanelater confusus (Fleutiaux, 1935)
- Lanelater crassiusculus (Candèze, 1857)
- Lanelater crassiventris (Schwarz, 1899)
- Lanelater densus Vats & Kashyap, 1993
- Lanelater dewalquei (Candèze, 1857)
- Lanelater divergens (Fairmaire, 1892)
- Lanelater ereptus (Candèze, 1874)
- Lanelater fallaciosus (Fairmaire, 1892)
- Lanelater fleutiauxi Hayek, 1973
- Lanelater fuscipes (Fabricius, 1775)
- Lanelater fusiformis (Candèze, 1857)
- Lanelater gestroi (Candèze, 1880)
- Lanelater glabratus (Gyllenhal, 1817)
- Lanelater glabrosus Vats & Kashyap, 1993
- Lanelater grandis (Hope, 1842)
- Lanelater gutturosus (Fairmaire, 1884)
- Lanelater hageni (Candèze, 1887)
- Lanelater hayekae Spilman, 1985
- Lanelater infuscatus (Klug, 1855)
- Lanelater insularis Fairmaire
- Lanelater javanus (Candèze, 1857)
- Lanelater judaicus (Reiche & Saulcy, 1857)
- Lanelater labeculatus (Candèze, 1892)
- Lanelater lacertosus (Candèze, 1857)
- Lanelater laosensis Ôhira, 1970
- Lanelater laticollis (Hope, 1843)
- Lanelater latior (W.J. Macleay, 1872)
- Lanelater longicollis (Candèze, 1889)
- Lanelater longicornis (Gahan, 1900)
- Lanelater lopezi (Fleutiaux, 1934)
- Lanelater lucerus Vats & Kashyap, 1993
- Lanelater luridus (Fabricius, 1781)
- Lanelater maculicollis (Gerstaecker, 1871)
- Lanelater mastersii (W.J. Macleay, 1872)
- Lanelater modestus (Schwarz, 1902)
- Lanelater moseri (Schwarz, 1903)
- Lanelater mucronatus (Candèze, 1857)
- Lanelater namibiensis Girard, 2008
- Lanelater natalensis Girard, 2008
- Lanelater naviauxi Chassain, 1983
- Lanelater nicoleae Wappler, 2003
- Lanelater nitidus (Fleutiaux, 1918)
- Lanelater notodonta (Latreille, 1827)
- Lanelater olcesii (Fairmaire, 1884)
- Lanelater opacus (Candèze, 1878)
- Lanelater pacificus (Candèze, 1882)
- Lanelater parallelicollis (Candèze, 1889)
- Lanelater parvus Platia & Schimmel, 1997
- Lanelater peringueyi (Candèze, 1889)
- Lanelater permucronatus (Schwarz, 1902)
- Lanelater persicus (Candèze, 1874)
- Lanelater pescadorensis (Miwa, 1934)
- Lanelater politus (Candèze, 1857)
- Lanelater ponderatus (Candèze, 1897)
- Lanelater proximus (Fleutiaux, 1935)
- Lanelater puber (Candèze, 1857)
- Lanelater pubescens (Candèze, 1857)
- Lanelater pumilus (Candèze, 1889)
- Lanelater resectus (Candèze, 1857)
- Lanelater robustus (Fleutiaux, 1902)
- Lanelater rubiginosus (Candèze, 1865)
- Lanelater rufus (Candèze, 1857)
- Lanelater sallei (LeConte, 1853)
- Lanelater saudarabicus Chassain, 1983
- Lanelater schotti (LeConte, 1853)
- Lanelater scortecci (Binaghi, 1941)
- Lanelater scutopentagonus Vats & Kashyap, 1993
- Lanelater semicribrosus (Fairmaire, 1887)
- Lanelater semistriatus (Schwarz, 1899)
- Lanelater sobrinus (Candèze, 1887)
- Lanelater soricinus (Candèze, 1882)
- Lanelater substriatus (Candèze, 1857)
- Lanelater tomentosus (Fabricius, 1798)
- Lanelater transvaalensis Girard, 2008
- Lanelater uhligi Girard, 2008
- Lanelater verae Troster, 1993
- Lanelater vishvai Vats & Kashyap, 1993
- Lanelater wittmeri Chassain, 1983
