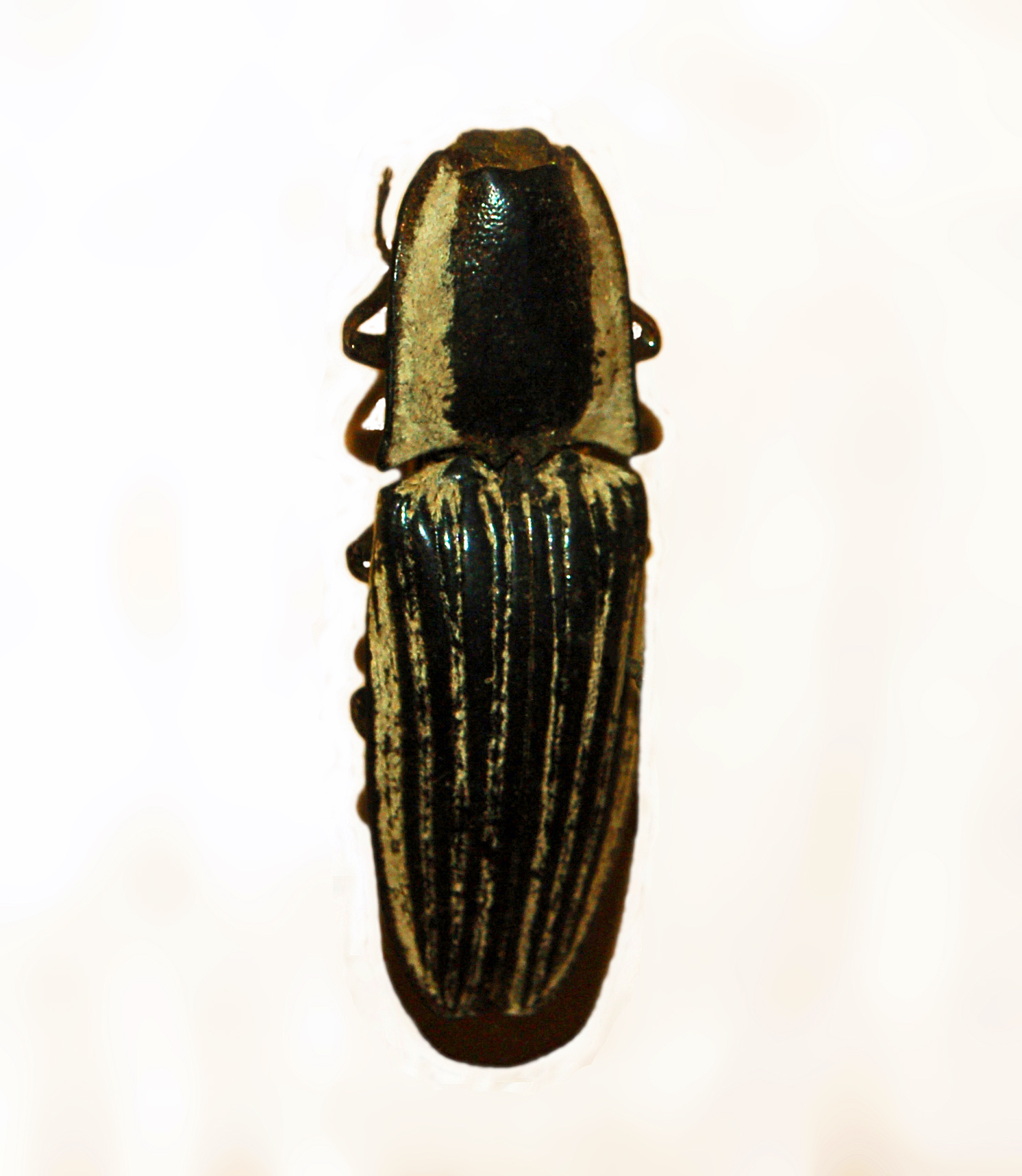
- Chalcolepidius zonatus from Brazil

Scientific classification
- Kingdom: Animalia
- Phylum: Arthropoda
- Clade: Pancrustacea
- Class: Insecta
- Order: Coleoptera
- Suborder: Polyphaga
- Infraorder: Elateriformia
- Family: Elateridae
- Genus: Chalcolepidius
- Species: C. zonatus

Binomial name
- Chalcolepidius zonatus Eschscholtz, 1829

Synonyms
- Chalcolepidius longicollis Candèze, 1857

= Chalcolepidius zonatus =

Species of beetle

Chalcolepidius zonatus is a species of beetles in the family Elateridae.

== Description ==
Chalcolepidius zonatus reaches about 40–50 millimetres (1.6–2.0 in) in length.

== Distribution ==
This species occurs in Argentina, Brazil, Guyana, Bolivia and Colombia.
