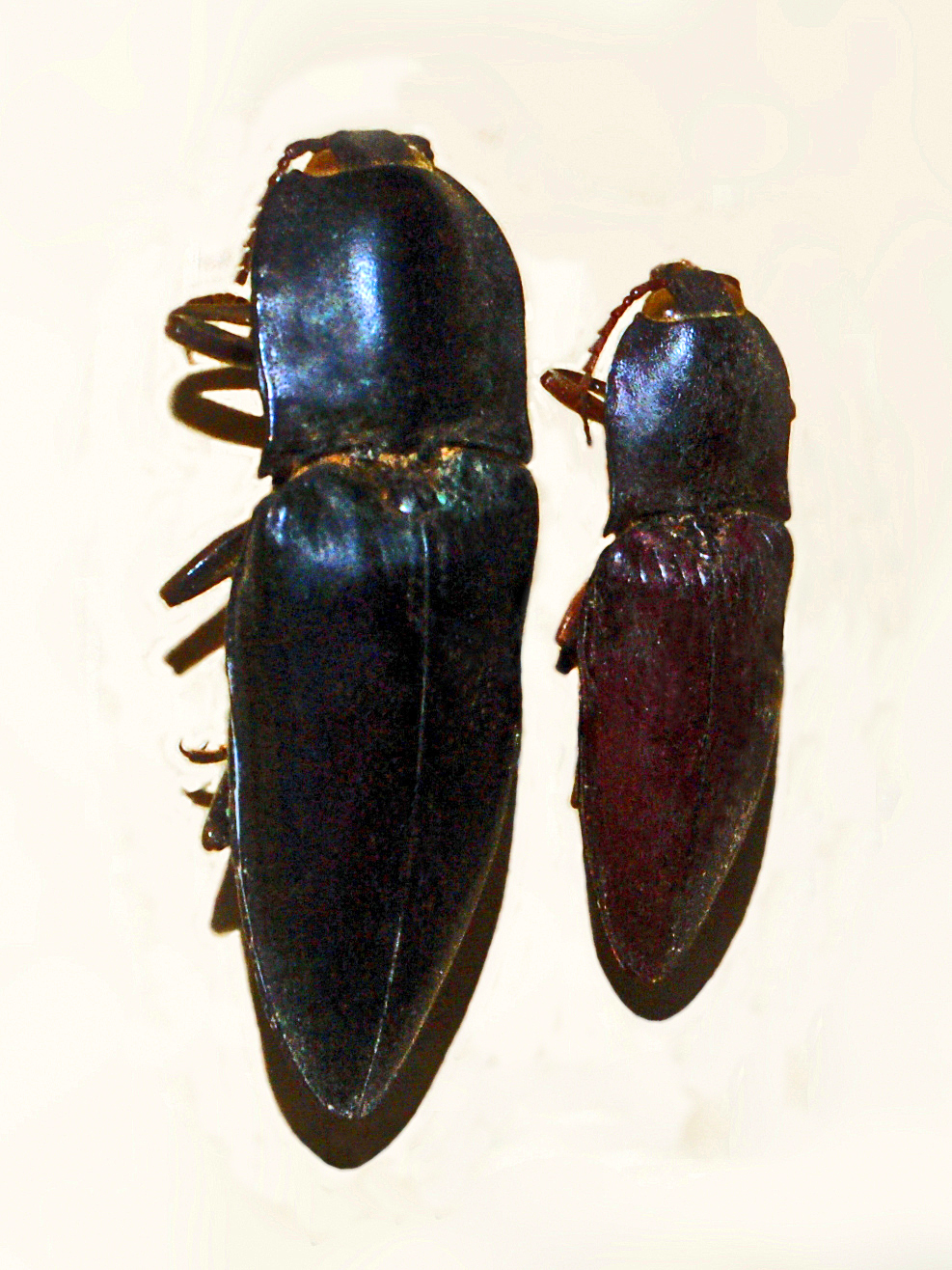
- Lanelater mastersii. Mounted specimen

Scientific classification
- Kingdom: Animalia
- Phylum: Arthropoda
- Class: Insecta
- Order: Coleoptera
- Suborder: Polyphaga
- Infraorder: Elateriformia
- Family: Elateridae
- Genus: Lanelater
- Species: L. mastersii

Binomial name
- Lanelater mastersii (W.J. Macleay, 1872)

Synonyms
- Agrypnus mastersii, W. J. Macleay, 1872

= Lanelater mastersii =

Species of beetle

Lanelater mastersii is a species of click beetle belonging to the family Elateridae.

== Description ==
Lanelater mastersii can reach a length of about 32–44 millimetres (1.3–1.7 in). The body is dark brown or black, while antennae are reddish. Prothorax is longer than the width, the sides are lightly rounded and the posterior angles are divergent and prolonged backwards. Elytra are as broad as the thorax at the base, lightly sinuate and gradually narrowed, rounded at the apex. Each elytron shows eight deep and distinctly punctured striae. This click beetle is a predator on scarab larvae.

== Distribution ==
This species can be found in north-east Australia.
