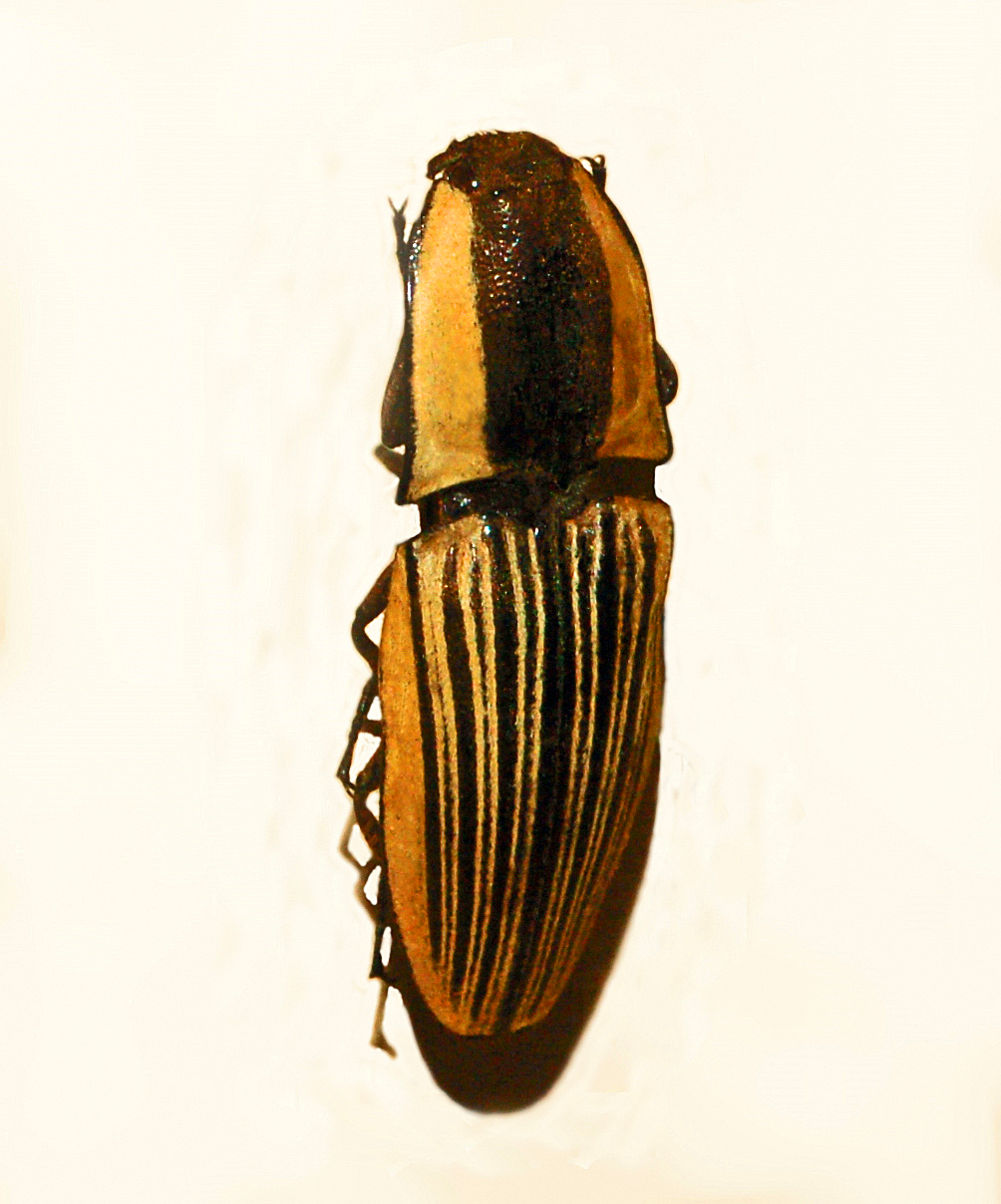
- Chalcolepidius limbatus from Argentina

Scientific classification
- Kingdom: Animalia
- Phylum: Arthropoda
- Clade: Pancrustacea
- Class: Insecta
- Order: Coleoptera
- Suborder: Polyphaga
- Infraorder: Elateriformia
- Family: Elateridae
- Genus: Chalcolepidius
- Species: C. limbatus

Binomial name
- Chalcolepidius limbatus (Fabricius, 1777)

Synonyms
- Elater limbatus Fabricius, 1777; Elater striatus Fabricius, 1801; Elater porcatus Olivier, 1790; Elater porcatus Herbst, 1801

= Chalcolepidius limbatus =

Species of beetle

Chalcolepidius limbatus is a species of beetles in the family Elateridae.

== Description ==
Chalcolepidius limbatus reaches a length of about 30 millimetres (1.2 in). The coloration is quite variable and may be green, olive-brown or yellowish. It shows lateral stripes on the pronotum.

== Distribution ==
This species occurs in West Indies (Virgin Islands), Trinidad, French Guiana, Guyana, Venezuela, Colombia, Peru, Ecuador, Bolivia, Brazil (Amazonas, Roraima, Paraíba, Pernambuco, Goiás, Mato Grosso, Mato Grosso do Sul, Bahia, Minas Gerais, Espírito Santo, Rio de Janeiro, São Paulo, Paraná, Santa Catarina, Rio Grande do Sul) Argentina, Paraguay and Uruguay.
