= Trieres (beetle) =

Scientific classification
- Domain: Eukaryota
- Kingdom: Animalia
- Phylum: Arthropoda
- Class: Insecta
- Order: Coleoptera
- Suborder: Polyphaga
- Infraorder: Elateriformia
- Family: Elateridae
- Subfamily: Agrypninae
- Tribe: Agrypnini
- Genus: Trieres; Candèze, 1900

Genus of beetles

Trieres is a genus of beetles belonging to the family Elateridae.

The genus was described in 1900 by Ernest Candèze.

Species:

- Trieres ramitarsus Candèze, 1900
