= List of Aeolus species =

List of species in the Aeolus genus of beetles

These 15 species belong to Aeolus, a genus of click beetles in the family Elateridae.

== Aeolus species ==
- Aeolus amabilis (LeConte, 1853)
- Aeolus dorsalis (Say, 1823)
- Aeolus facetus Candèze, 1859
- Aeolus leprieuri Candèze, 1859
- Aeolus mannerheimi Candèze, 1859
- Aeolus melliculus Candèze, 1859
- Aeolus nigromaculatus Drapiez, 1819
- Aeolus parvulus Schwarz, 1903
- Aeolus retrofasciatus Candèze, 1859
- Aeolus rubricatus Candèze, 1859
- Aeolus signatipennis Candèze, 1859
- Aeolus signatus Schwarz, 1902
- Aeolus signifer Candèze, 1859
- Aeolus unifasciatus (Fabricius, 1801)
- Aeolus variolatus Candèze, 1878
