= Agraeus (beetle) =

Scientific classification
- Domain: Eukaryota
- Kingdom: Animalia
- Phylum: Arthropoda
- Class: Insecta
- Order: Coleoptera
- Suborder: Polyphaga
- Infraorder: Elateriformia
- Family: Elateridae
- Subfamily: Agrypninae
- Tribe: Agrypnini
- Genus: Agraeus; Candèze, 1857

Synonyms
- Trachylacon Motschulsky, 1858; Trochylacon Motschulsky, 1858 (misspelling); Cavicoxum Pic, 1928

Genus of beetles

Agraeus is a genus of click beetles belonging to the family Elateridae and the subfamily Agrypninae. Many species have bizarre anatomical modifications that are indicative of an association with ants, but this has not yet been directly confirmed.
