= Euplinthini =

Scientific classification
- Domain: Eukaryota
- Kingdom: Animalia
- Phylum: Arthropoda
- Class: Insecta
- Order: Coleoptera
- Suborder: Polyphaga
- Infraorder: Elateriformia
- Family: Elateridae
- Subfamily: Agrypninae
- Tribe: Euplinthini; Costa, 1975

Synonyms
- Heligmini Costa, 1975

Tribe of beetles

The Euplinthini form an accepted taxonomic tribe within the Elateridae (click beetle) subfamily Agrypninae.

== Genera ==
- Arcanelater Costa, 1975
- Cleidecosta Johnson, 2002
- Compsoplinthus Costa, 1975
- Euplinthus Costa, 1975
- Meroplinthus Candèze, 1891
- Paraphileus Candèze, 1882
- Pyrischius Hyslop, 1921
