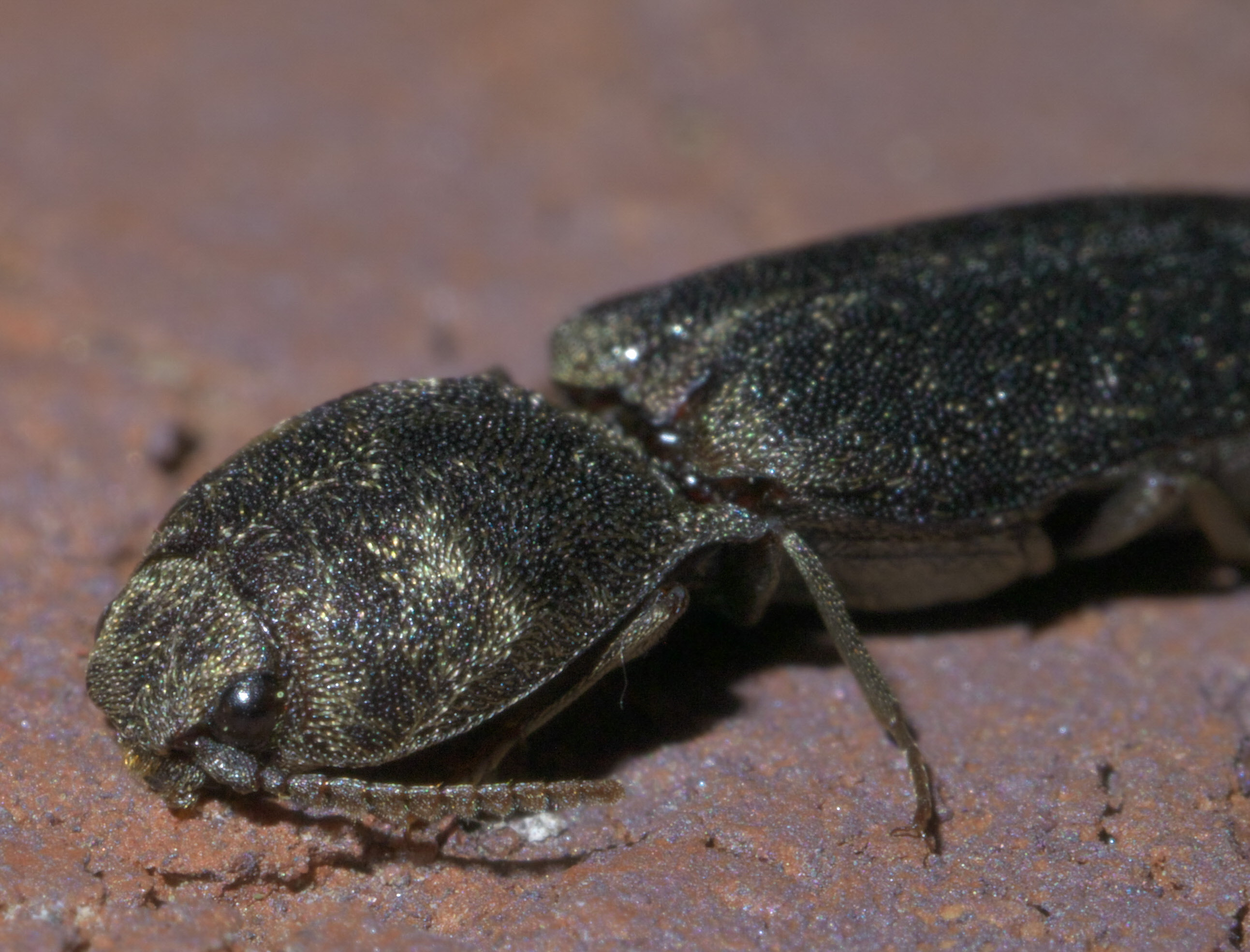

Scientific classification
- Domain: Eukaryota
- Kingdom: Animalia
- Phylum: Arthropoda
- Class: Insecta
- Order: Coleoptera
- Suborder: Polyphaga
- Infraorder: Elateriformia
- Family: Elateridae
- Subfamily: Agrypninae
- Tribe: Agrypnini
- Genus: Lacon; Laporte, 1838

= Lacon (beetle) =

Genus of beetles

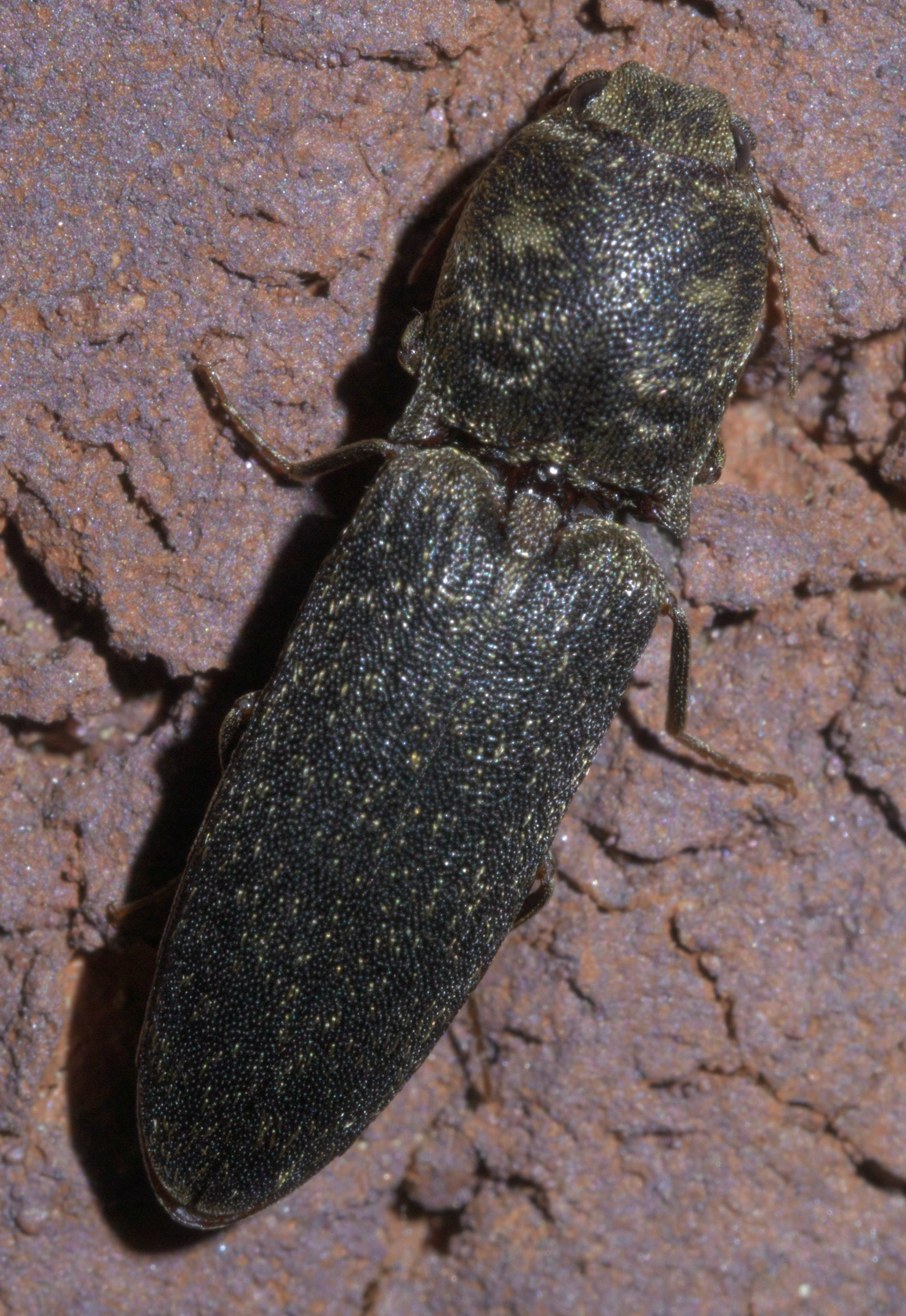

Lacon is a genus of click beetle belonging to the family Elateridae and the subfamily Agrypninae.

== Species ==
These 46 species belong to the genus Lacon:

- Lacon atayal Kishii, 1991^{g}
- Lacon auroratus (Say, 1839)^{g b}
- Lacon avitus (Say, 1839)^{g b}
- Lacon bipectinatus Riese, 1989^{g}
- Lacon caeruleus Schimmel, 1998^{g}
- Lacon chabannei (Guérin, 1829)^{g}
- Lacon churakagi (Ohira, 1971)^{g}
- Lacon conspersus (Gyllenhal, 1808)^{g}
- Lacon cuneatus (Candèze, 1865)^{g}
- Lacon diqingensis^{g}
- Lacon discoideus (Weber, 1801)^{g b}
- Lacon fasciatus (Linnaeus, 1758)^{g}
- Lacon funebris Solsky, 1881^{g}
- Lacon gillerforsi Platia & Schimmel, 1994^{g}
- Lacon giuglarisi Chassain, 2005^{g}
- Lacon graecus (Candeze, 1857)^{g}
- Lacon impressicollis (Say, 1825)^{g b}
- Lacon jacquieri (Candèze, 1857)^{g}
- Lacon kapleri Platia & Schimmel, 1994^{g}
- Lacon kikuchii Miwa, 1929^{g}
- Lacon kintaroui Kishii, 1990^{g}
- Lacon kushihige Kishii, 1990^{g}
- Lacon laticollis (Candèze, 1857)^{g}
- Lacon lepidopterus (Panzer, 1801)^{g}
- Lacon lijiangensis^{g}
- Lacon linearis (Candèze, 1868)^{g}
- Lacon maculatus (LeConte, 1866)^{g}
- Lacon mamillatus (Candèze, 1865)^{g}
- Lacon marmoratus (Fabricius, 1801)^{g b} (marbled click beetle)
- Lacon mausoni Hayek, 1973^{g}
- Lacon mekrani Candeze, 1889^{g}
- Lacon mexicanus (Candèze, 1857)^{b}
- Lacon modestus (Boisduval, 1835)^{i g}
- Lacon nadaii Platia & Nemeth, 2011^{g}
- Lacon nobilis (Fall, 1932)^{b}
- Lacon pectinatus (Candèze, 1865)^{g}
- Lacon pollinarius (Candèze, 1857)^{g}
- Lacon punctatus (Herbst, 1779)^{g}
- Lacon puriensis Kishii, 1991^{g}
- Lacon pyrsolepis (LeConte, 1866)^{b}
- Lacon querceus (Herbst, 1784)^{g}
- Lacon ramatasenseni (Miwa, 1934)^{g}
- Lacon rorulentus (LeConte, 1859)^{g b}
- Lacon sparsus (Candèze, 1865)^{g b}
- Lacon subcostatus (Candèze, 1857)^{g}
- Lacon unicolor Candeze, 1874^{g}

Data sources: i = ITIS, g = GBIF, b = Bugguide.net
