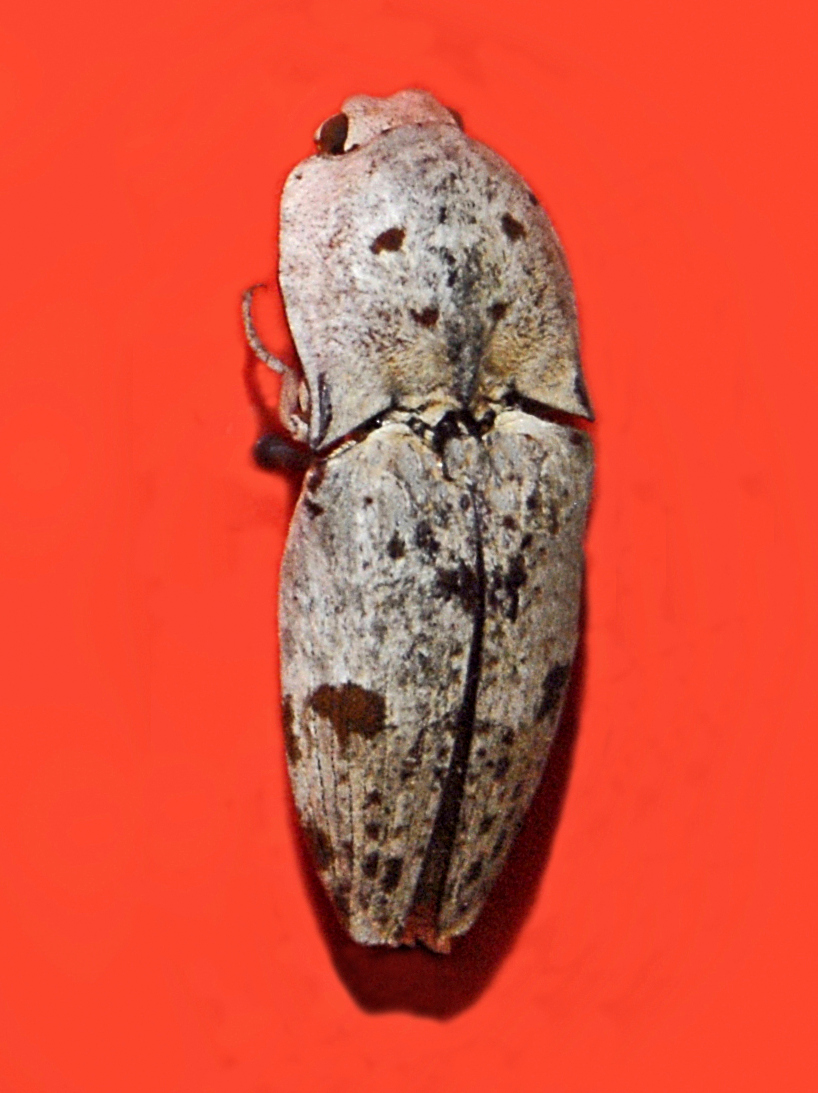
- Cryptalaus lacteus

Scientific classification
- Domain: Eukaryota
- Kingdom: Animalia
- Phylum: Arthropoda
- Class: Insecta
- Order: Coleoptera
- Suborder: Polyphaga
- Infraorder: Elateriformia
- Family: Elateridae
- Genus: Cryptalaus; Ôhira, 1967

Synonyms
- Paracalais Neboiss, 1967

= Cryptalaus =

Genus of beetles

Cryptalaus is a genus of click beetles belonging to the family Elateridae.

== Species ==
- Cryptalaus albatus (Candèze, 1897)
- Cryptalaus beauchenei (Fleutiaux, 1903)
- Cryptalaus berus (Candèze, 1864)
- Cryptalaus birmanicus (Bouwer, 1993)
- Cryptalaus cenchris (Candèze, 1857)
- Cryptalaus chinensis (Ôhira, 1970)
- Cryptalaus darwini (Blackburn, 1890)
- Cryptalaus depressicollis (Schwarz, 1900)
- Cryptalaus elaps (Candèze, 1874)
- Cryptalaus elongatus (Miwa, 1929)
- Cryptalaus eryx (Candèze, 1874)
- Cryptalaus fornicatus (Neboiss, 1967)
- Cryptalaus funebris (Candèze, 1857)
- Cryptalaus funereus (Candèze, 1865)
- Cryptalaus gibboni (Newman, 1857)
- Cryptalaus gigas (Candèze, 1857)
- Cryptalaus griseofasciatus (Schwarz, 1902)
- Cryptalaus guamensis (Van Zwaluwenburg, 1952)
- Cryptalaus hayekae (Neboiss, 1967)
- Cryptalaus lacteus (Fabricius, 1801)
- Cryptalaus larvatus (Candèze, 1874)
- Cryptalaus lectilis (Candèze, 1897)
- Cryptalaus lynceus (Candèze, 1874)
- Cryptalaus macleayi (Candèze, 1857)
- Cryptalaus melancholicus (Candèze, 1874)
- Cryptalaus morobensis (Reise, 1995)
- Cryptalaus mortuus (J. Thomson, 1856)
- Cryptalaus murinus (Neboiss, 1967)
- Cryptalaus mus (Miwa, 1929)
- Cryptalaus nebulosus (Candèze, 1857)
- Cryptalaus nesiotes (Neboiss, 1967)
- Cryptalaus nubilus (Candèze, 1857)
- Cryptalaus podargus (Candèze, 1874)
- Cryptalaus prosapius (Neboiss, 1967)
- Cryptalaus prosectus (Candèze, 1857)
- Cryptalaus pumilus (Candèze, 1874)
- Cryptalaus putridus (Candèze, 1857)
- Cryptalaus rakuda Arimoto, 2008
- Cryptalaus sabinae (Bouwer, 1993)
- Cryptalaus sculptus (Westwood, 1848)
- Cryptalaus scytale (Candèze, 1857)
- Cryptalaus semperi (Candèze, 1875)
- Cryptalaus sericeus (Candèze, 1874)
- Cryptalaus shibatai Kishii, 1996
- Cryptalaus sordidus (Westwood, 1848)
- Cryptalaus spiciformis (Neboiss, 1967)
- Cryptalaus spinicollis (Van Zwaluwenburg, 1951)
- Cryptalaus suboculatus (Candèze, 1857)
- Cryptalaus superbus (Candèze, 1875)
- Cryptalaus victoriae (Schwarz, 1902)
- Cryptalaus vitilevu Johnson, 2002
- Cryptalaus watarusuzukii Arimoto, 2008
- Cryptalaus yamato (Nakane, 1957)
