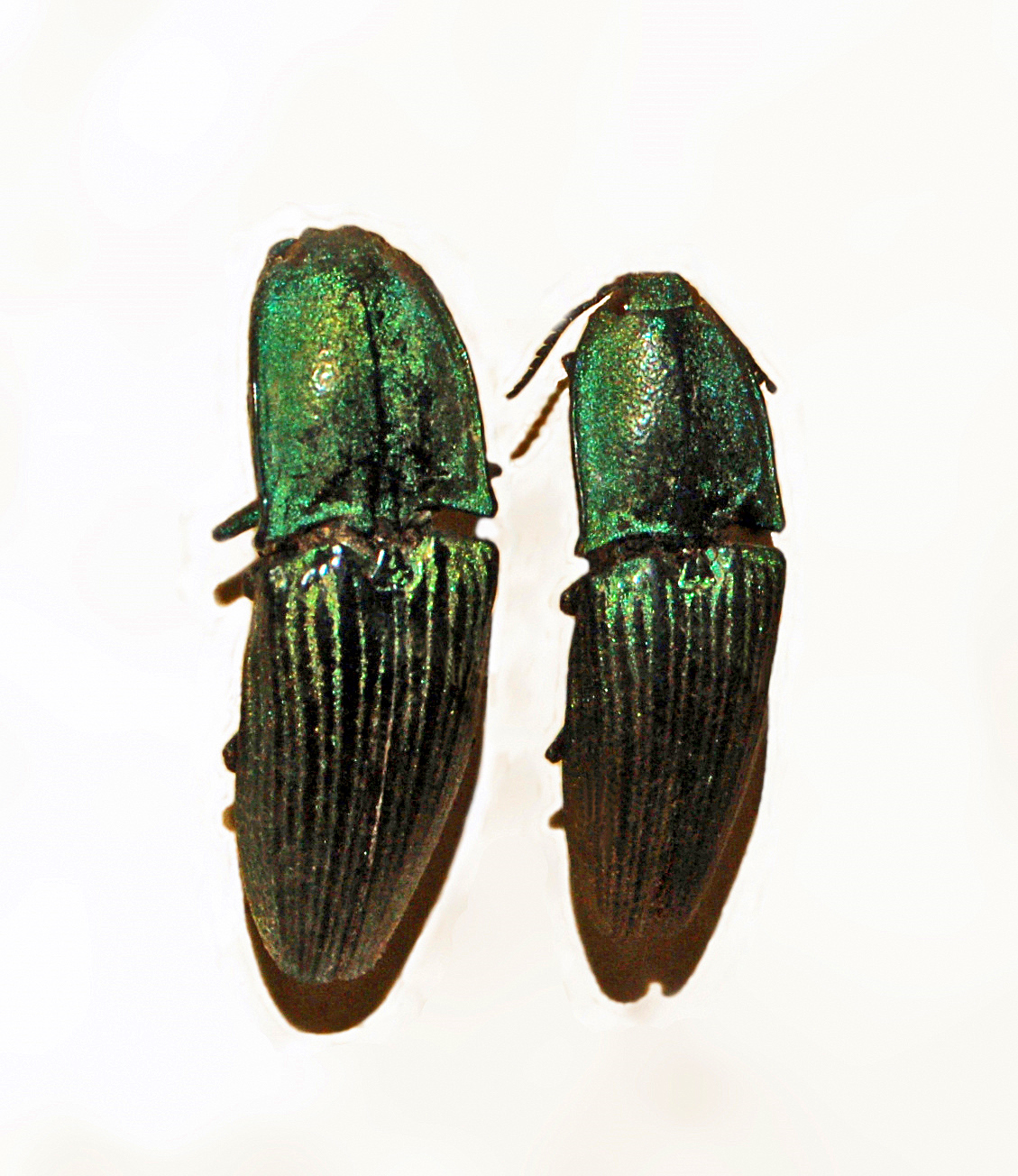
- Chalcolepidius virens from Venezuela

Scientific classification
- Domain: Eukaryota
- Kingdom: Animalia
- Phylum: Arthropoda
- Class: Insecta
- Order: Coleoptera
- Suborder: Polyphaga
- Infraorder: Elateriformia
- Family: Elateridae
- Genus: Chalcolepidius; Eschscholtz, 1829

= Chalcolepidius =

Genus of beetles

Chalcolepidius is a genus of beetles in the family Elateridae.

== List of species ==
- Chalcolepidius albisetosus Casari, 2002
- Chalcolepidius albiventris Casari, 2002
- Chalcolepidius angustatus Candèze, 1857
- Chalcolepidius apacheanus Casey, 1891
- Chalcolepidius approximatus Erichson, 1841
- Chalcolepidius attenuatus Erichson, 1841
- Chalcolepidius aurulentus Candèze, 1874
- Chalcolepidius bomplandii Guerin-Meneville, 1844
- Chalcolepidius boucardi Candèze, 1874
- Chalcolepidius chalcantheus Candèze, 1857
- Chalcolepidius copulatuvittatus Casari, 2002
- Chalcolepidius corpulentus Candèze, 1874
- Chalcolepidius costatus Pjatakowa, 1941
- Chalcolepidius cyaneus Candèze, 1881
- Chalcolepidius desmaresti Chevrolat, 1835
- Chalcolepidius dugesi Candèze, 1886
- Chalcolepidius erythroloma Candèze, 1857
- Chalcolepidius eschscholtzi Chevrolat, 1833
- Chalcolepidius extenuatuvittatus Casari, 2002
- Chalcolepidius exulatus Candèze, 1874
- Chalcolepidius fabricii Erichson, 1841
- Chalcolepidius fasciatus Casari, 2002
- Chalcolepidius ferratuvittatus Casari, 2002
- Chalcolepidius fleutiauxi Pjatakowa, 1941
- Chalcolepidius forreri Candèze, 1886
- Chalcolepidius fryi Candèze, 1874
- Chalcolepidius gossipiatus Guerin-Meneville, 1844
- Chalcolepidius inops Candèze, 1886
- Chalcolepidius jansoni Candèze, 1874
- Chalcolepidius lacordairei Candèze, 1857
- Chalcolepidius lafargi Chevrolat, 1835
- Chalcolepidius lenzi Candèze, 1886
- Chalcolepidius limbatus Eschscholtz, 1829
- Chalcolepidius mexicanus Laporte, 1836
- Chalcolepidius mniszechi Candèze, 1881
- Chalcolepidius mocquerysi Candèze, 1857
- Chalcolepidius morio Candèze, 1857
- Chalcolepidius obscurus Laporte, 1836
- Chalcolepidius oxydatus Candèze, 1857
- Chalcolepidius porcatus (Linnaeus, 1767)
- Chalcolepidius proximus Casari, 2002
- Chalcolepidius pruinosus Erichson, 1841
- Chalcolepidius rodriguezi Candèze, 1886
- Chalcolepidius rostainei Candèze, 1889
- Chalcolepidius rubripennis LeConte, 1861
- Chalcolepidius rugatus Candèze, 1857
- Chalcolepidius serricornis Casari, 2002
- Chalcolepidius silbermanni Chevrolat, 1835
- Chalcolepidius smaragdinus LeConte, 1854
- Chalcolepidius spinipennis Casari, 2002
- Chalcolepidius sulcatus (Fabricius, 1777)
- Chalcolepidius supremus Casari, 2002
- Chalcolepidius tartarus Fall, 1898
- Chalcolepidius truncuvittatus Casari, 2002
- Chalcolepidius validus Candèze, 1857
- Chalcolepidius villei Candèze, 1878
- Chalcolepidius virens (Fabricius, 1787)
- Chalcolepidius virgatipennis Casari, 2002
- Chalcolepidius virginalis Candèze, 1857
- Chalcolepidius viridipilis (Say, 1825)
- Chalcolepidius viriditarsus Schwarz, 1906
- Chalcolepidius webbi LeConte, 1854
- Chalcolepidius zonatus Eschscholtz, 1829
