= Aeoloderma =

Scientific classification
- Domain: Eukaryota
- Kingdom: Animalia
- Phylum: Arthropoda
- Class: Insecta
- Order: Coleoptera
- Suborder: Polyphaga
- Infraorder: Elateriformia
- Family: Elateridae
- Genus: Aeoloderma; Fleutiaux, 1928

Genus of beetles

Aeoloderma is a genus of beetles belonging to the family Elateridae.

The species of this genus are found in Japan, Australia.

Species:

- Aeoloderma brachmana (Candeze, 1859)'
