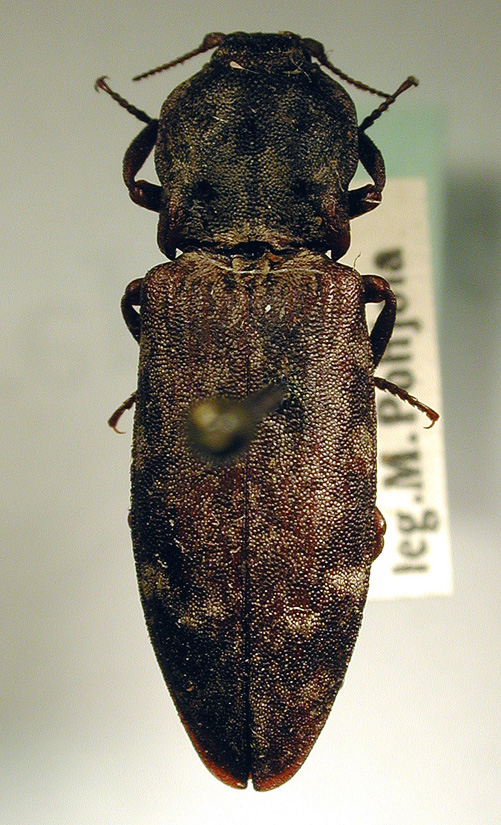
- Danosoma conspersa

Scientific classification
- Kingdom: Animalia
- Phylum: Arthropoda
- Class: Insecta
- Order: Coleoptera
- Suborder: Polyphaga
- Infraorder: Elateriformia
- Family: Elateridae
- Genus: Danosoma; Thompson, 1859

= Danosoma =

Genus of beetles

Danosoma is a genus of beetles belonging to the family Elateridae.

The species of this genus are found in Europe and North America.

Species:

- Danosoma brevicorne (LeConte, 1853)
- Danosoma fasciata (Linnaeus 1758)
