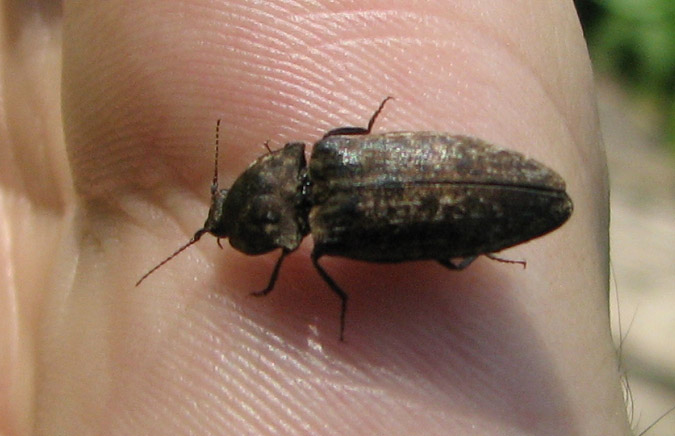
- Adelocera murina

Scientific classification
- Kingdom: Animalia
- Phylum: Arthropoda
- Class: Insecta
- Order: Coleoptera
- Suborder: Polyphaga
- Infraorder: Elateriformia
- Family: Elateridae
- Genus: Adelocera; Latreille, 1829

= Adelocera =

Genus of beetles

Adelocera is a genus of beetles belonging to the family Elateridae.

The genus has almost cosmopolitan distribution. The species of this genus are found in Europe and North America.

Species:

- Adelocera ami Kishii, 1996
- Adelocera baghensis, found in Pakistan
- Adelocera oblongus (originally Brachylacon beardsleyi, Ôhira & Becker, 1978) (Fleutiaux), found in Hawaii
- Adelocera nitidus (Candèze 1857)
