= Heteroderes =

Scientific classification
- Kingdom: Animalia
- Phylum: Arthropoda
- Class: Insecta
- Order: Coleoptera
- Suborder: Polyphaga
- Infraorder: Elateriformia
- Family: Elateridae
- Genus: Heteroderes; Latreille, 1834

Genus of beetles

Heteroderes is a genus of beetles belonging to the family Elateridae.

The genus has cosmopolitan distribution.

Species:

- Heteroderes albicans Candeze, 1878
