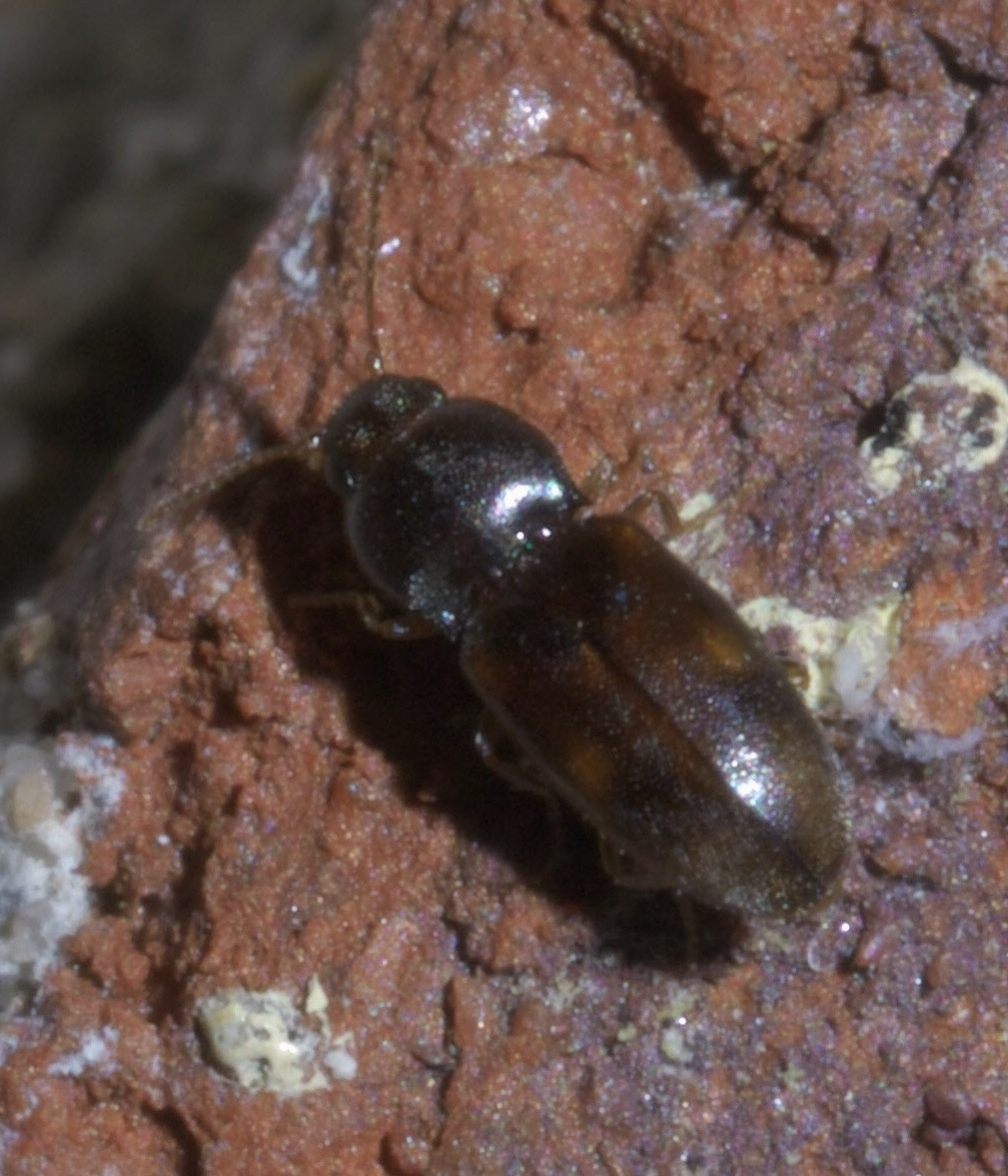
- Paradonus obliquatulus

Scientific classification
- Kingdom: Animalia
- Phylum: Arthropoda
- Class: Insecta
- Order: Coleoptera
- Suborder: Polyphaga
- Infraorder: Elateriformia
- Family: Elateridae
- Subfamily: Negastriinae; Nakane & Kishii, 1956

= Negastriinae =

Subfamily of beetles

Negastriinae is a subfamily of click beetles in the family Elateridae.

== North American Genera ==
- Fleutiauxellus Méquignon, 1930^{g b}
- Microhypnus Kishii, 1976^{g b}
- Migiwa Kishii, 1966^{g b}
- Negastrius C.G.Thomson, 1859^{g b}
- Neohypdonus Stibick, 1971^{g b}
- Oedostethus LeConte, 1853^{g b}
- Paradonus Stibick, 1971^{g b}
- Zorochros Thompson, 1858^{g b}

Data sources: i = ITIS, c = Catalogue of Life, g = GBIF, b = Bugguide.net
