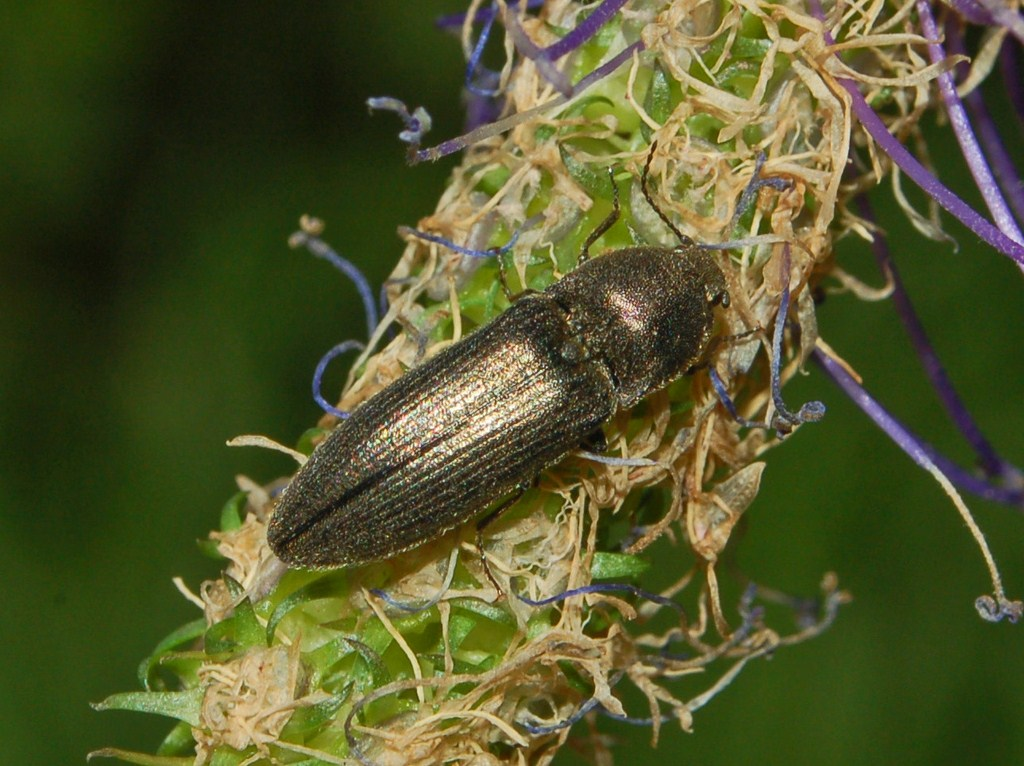

Scientific classification
- Domain: Eukaryota
- Kingdom: Animalia
- Phylum: Arthropoda
- Class: Insecta
- Order: Coleoptera
- Suborder: Polyphaga
- Infraorder: Elateriformia
- Family: Elateridae
- Genus: Cidnopus
- Species: C. pilosus

Binomial name
- Cidnopus pilosus (Leske, 1785)

Synonyms
- Elater nigripes Gyllenhal, 1808; Elater pilosus Leske, 1785; Limonius cyanescens Buysson, 1902; Limonius ferrugineu s Buysson, 1902

= Cidnopus pilosus =

Species of beetle

Cidnopus pilosus is a species of click beetle belonging to the subfamily Dendrometrinae of the family Elateridae.

== Distribution ==
This species is present in most of Europe, in the eastern Palearctic realm and in the Near East. It is missing in the British Isles.

== Habitat ==
These beetles mainly inhabit heaths, open forests, meadows, hedge rows and the lower vegetation, with preference for sunny environments.

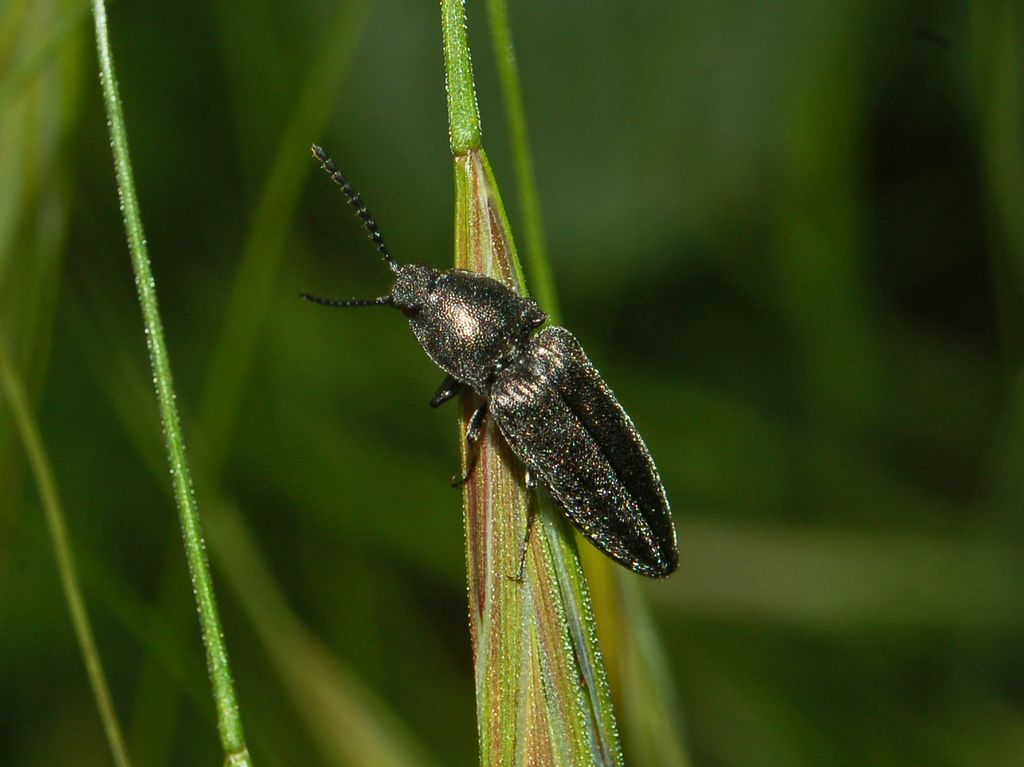
C. pilosus - Male

== Description ==
The adults grow up to 8–13 millimetres (0.31–0.51 in) long. The pronotum is strong, tightly punctured, and a little wider than long. Elytra have distinct stripes of points. The 3rd segment of antennae is significantly longer than the 2nd, almost as long as the 4th. The first elements can be inserted into a groove on the inner edge of the prothorax. The basic color is metallic black, with bronze luster. The upper side of the body is covered by gray hairs.

== Biology ==
Adults can mostly be encountered from April through July. The larvae mainly feed on roots of Poaceae species. The main host-plants are Rosaceae, Poaceae and Apiaceae species, as Crataegus and Heracleum species, etc.
