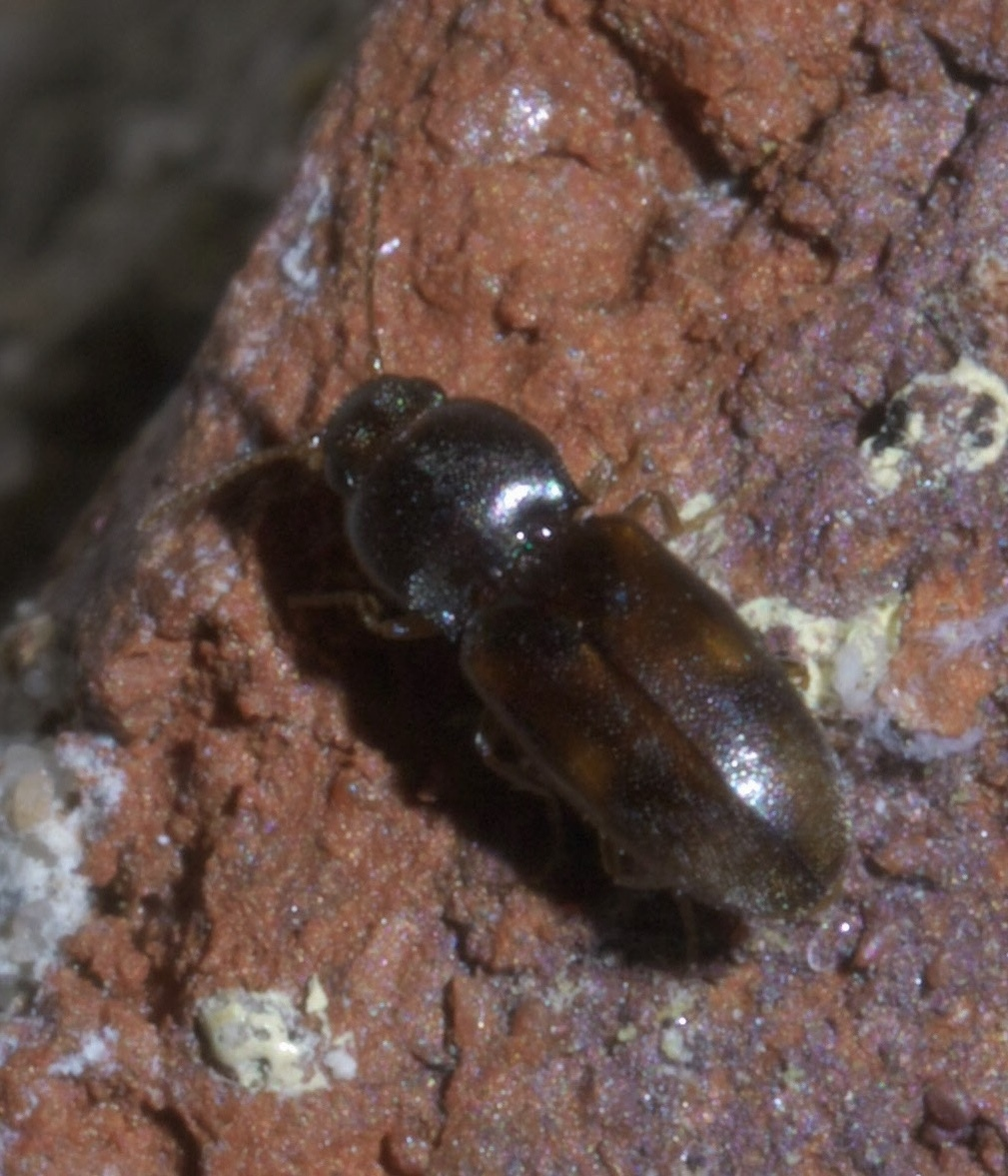

Scientific classification
- Domain: Eukaryota
- Kingdom: Animalia
- Phylum: Arthropoda
- Class: Insecta
- Order: Coleoptera
- Suborder: Polyphaga
- Infraorder: Elateriformia
- Family: Elateridae
- Genus: Paradonus
- Species: P. obliquatulus

Binomial name
- Paradonus obliquatulus (Melsheimer, 1848)

= Paradonus obliquatulus =

Species of beetle

Paradonus obliquatulus is a species of click beetle in the family Elateridae.
