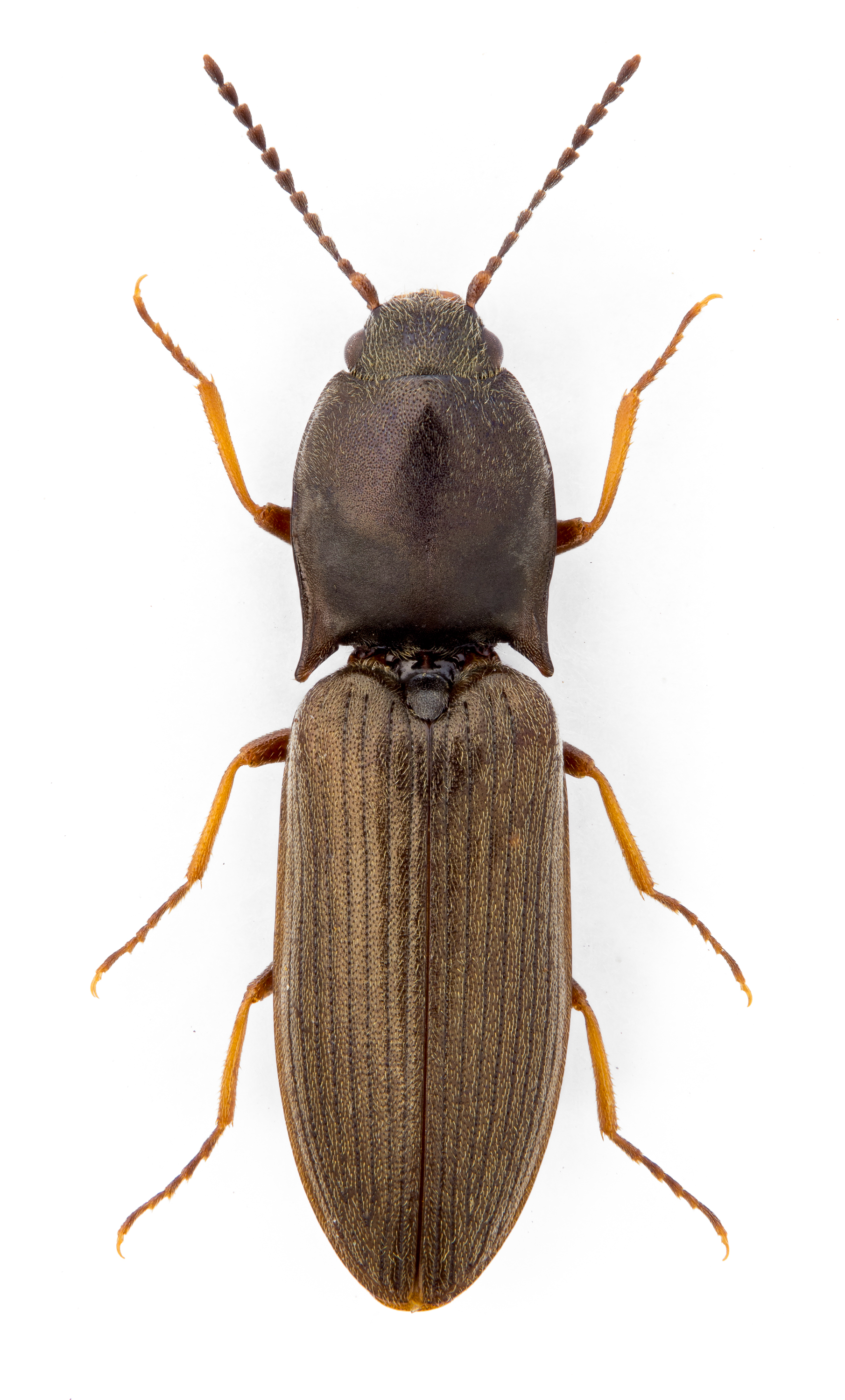

Scientific classification
- Kingdom: Animalia
- Phylum: Arthropoda
- Class: Insecta
- Order: Coleoptera
- Suborder: Polyphaga
- Infraorder: Elateriformia
- Family: Elateridae
- Genus: Aplotarsus
- Species: A. incanus

Binomial name
- Aplotarsus incanus (Gyllenhal, 1827)

= Aplotarsus incanus =

Species of beetle

Aplotarsus incanus is a species of click beetles native to Europe.

== Description ==
This beetle has a linear, elongated and convex brown-black body. Its appendages are also brownish-black.
