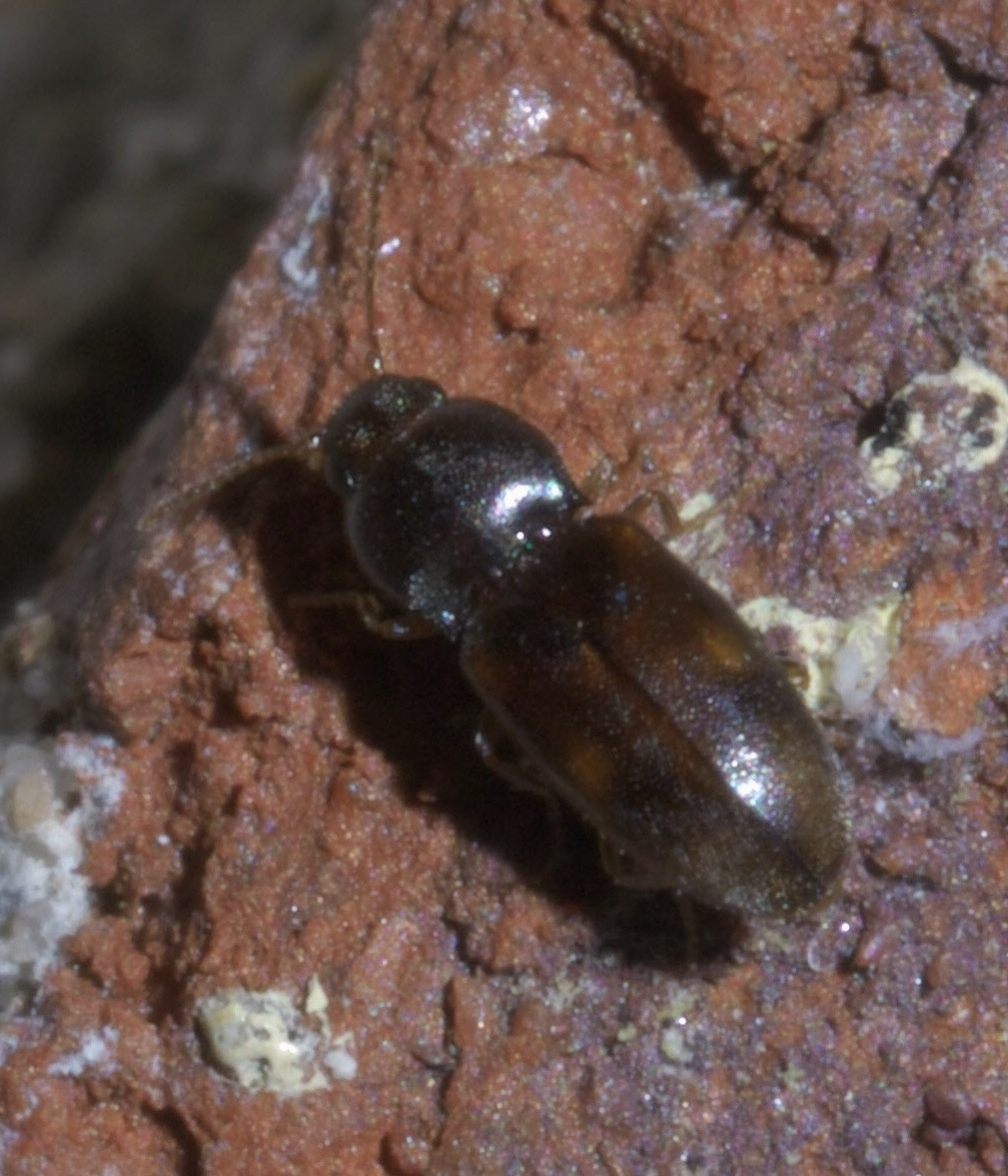
- Paradonus obliquatulus

Scientific classification
- Domain: Eukaryota
- Kingdom: Animalia
- Phylum: Arthropoda
- Class: Insecta
- Order: Coleoptera
- Suborder: Polyphaga
- Infraorder: Elateriformia
- Family: Elateridae
- Subfamily: Negastriinae
- Genus: Paradonus; Stibick, 1971

= Paradonus =

Genus of beetles

Paradonus is a genus of click beetles in the family Elateridae. There are about six described species in Paradonus.

== Species ==
These six species belong to the genus Paradonus:

- Paradonus beckeri Stibick, 1990^{g b}
- Paradonus futilis^{b}
- Paradonus inops^{b}
- Paradonus obliquatulus (Melsheimer, 1848)^{g b}
- Paradonus olivereae Stibick, 1990^{g b}
- Paradonus pectoralis (Say, 1834)^{g b}

Data sources: i = ITIS, c = Catalogue of Life, g = GBIF, b = Bugguide.net
