= Dima marvani =

Scientific classification
- Kingdom: Animalia
- Phylum: Arthropoda
- Class: Insecta
- Order: Coleoptera
- Suborder: Polyphaga
- Infraorder: Elateriformia
- Family: Elateridae
- Genus: Dima
- Species: D. marvani

Binomial name
- Dima marvani (Mertlik & Dusanek, 2006)
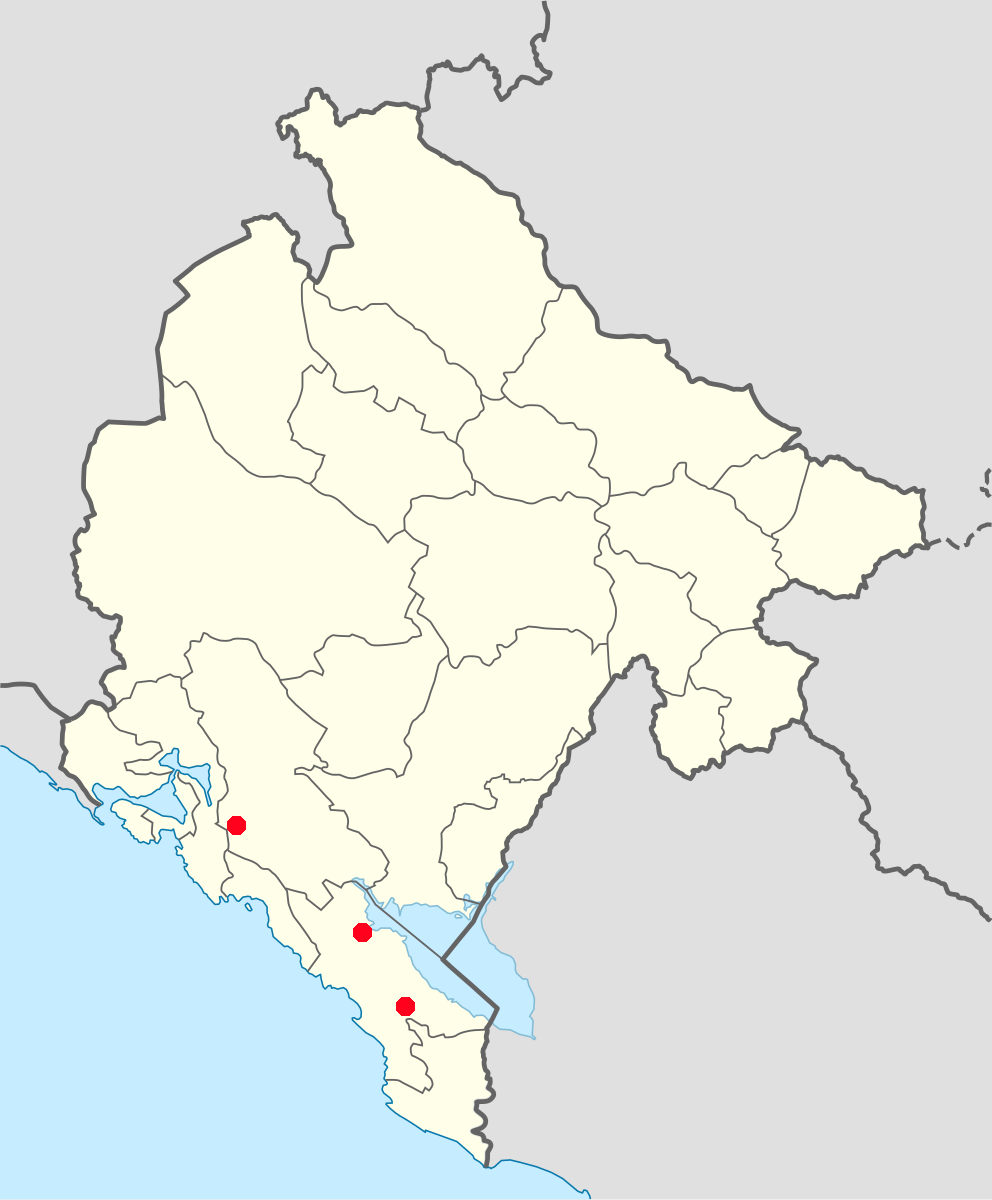
- Dima marvani records map

Species of click beetle

Dima marvani is a species of click beetle (Elateridae) in the subfamily Dendrometrinae.

== Distribution ==
Dima marvani is endemic to southern Montenegro. Its distribution is likely restricted to the southern coastal mountain ranges, within municipalities such as Bar, Budva, Cetinje, and Kotor.

Dima marvani is a high-altitude species, found between 880 and 1200 meters above sea level where it inhabits the cool, humid conditions of its montane environment. Its habitat is characterized by the exposed limestone rock, fissures, crevices, and scree slopes of the Dinaric Alps, which provide essential shelter and retain moisture.

As a member of the subfamily Dendrometrinae, this species is likely to be found in microhabitats with abundant moisture and organic matter. These include the moist leaf litter accumulated under trees, decaying logs and stumps in advanced stages of decomposition, and moss-covered ground and rocks. Stable, cool, and damp refuges such as rock crevices are also integral to its preferred habitat.
