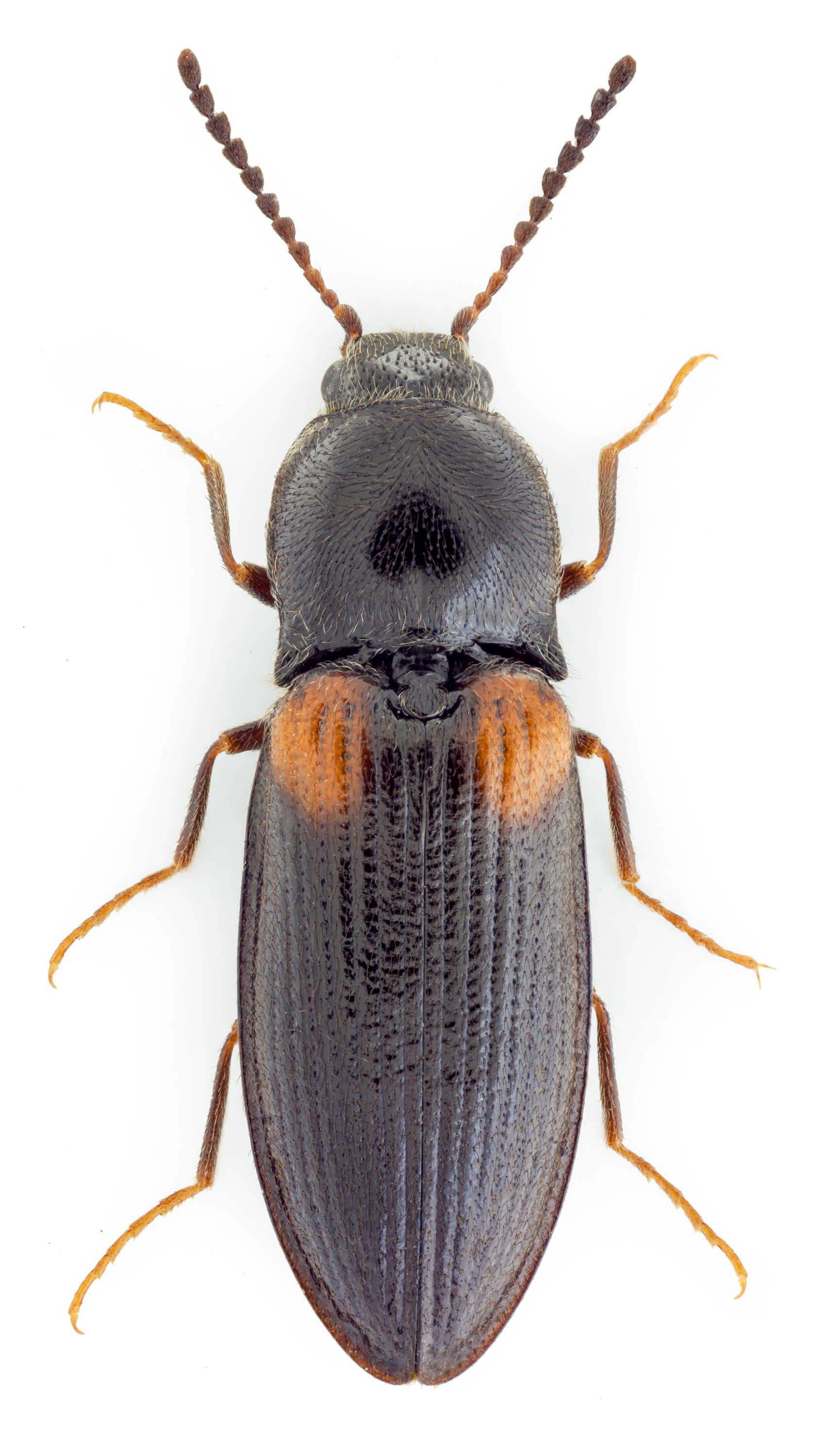

Scientific classification
- Kingdom: Animalia
- Phylum: Arthropoda
- Class: Insecta
- Order: Coleoptera
- Suborder: Polyphaga
- Infraorder: Elateriformia
- Family: Elateridae
- Genus: Calambus
- Species: C. bipustulatus

Binomial name
- Calambus bipustulatus (Linnaeus, 1767)

= Calambus bipustulatus =

Species of beetle

Calambus bipustulatus is a species of click beetles native to Europe.
