= Zorochros titanus =

Scientific classification
- Kingdom: Animalia
- Phylum: Arthropoda
- Class: Insecta
- Order: Coleoptera
- Suborder: Polyphaga
- Infraorder: Elateriformia
- Family: Elateridae
- Genus: Zorochros
- Species: Z. titanus

Binomial name
- Zorochros titanus (Dolin & Cate 1998)

Synonyms
- Zorochrus titanus Dolin & Cate, 1998

Species of beetle

Zorochros titanus is a species of click beetle found in Sri Lanka.
