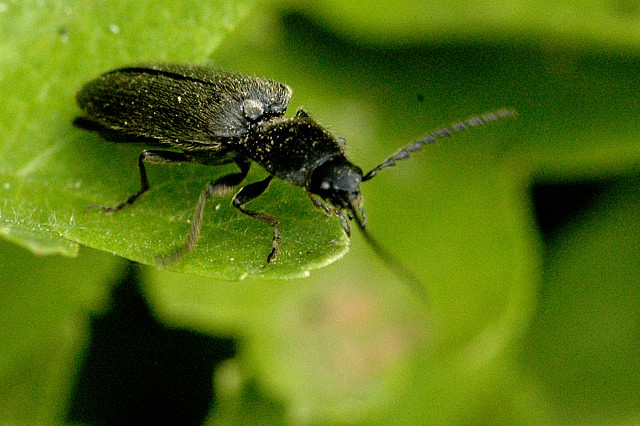

Scientific classification
- Kingdom: Animalia
- Phylum: Arthropoda
- Clade: Pancrustacea
- Class: Insecta
- Order: Coleoptera
- Suborder: Polyphaga
- Infraorder: Elateriformia
- Family: Elateridae
- Genus: Synaptus
- Species: S. filiformis

Binomial name
- Synaptus filiformis (Fabricius, 1781)

= Synaptus filiformis =

Species of beetle

Synaptus filiformis (colloquially hairy click beetle) is a species of beetle belonging to the family Elateridae.

It is native to Europe and Western Asia.
