= Mulsanteus hirtellus =

Scientific classification
- Kingdom: Animalia
- Phylum: Arthropoda
- Class: Insecta
- Order: Coleoptera
- Suborder: Polyphaga
- Infraorder: Elateriformia
- Superfamily: Elateroidea
- Family: Elateridae
- Genus: Mulsanteus
- Species: M. hirtellus

Binomial name
- Mulsanteus hirtellus (Candèze, 1863)

Synonyms
- Ludius hirtellus Candèze, 1863; Trichophorus hirtellus (Candèze, 1863): Schwarz, 1906; Neotrichophorus hirtellus (Candèze, 1863)

Species of beetle

Mulsanteus hirtellus, is a species of click beetle found in India, Sri Lanka, Nepal and Bhutan.
