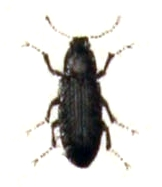

Scientific classification
- Kingdom: Animalia
- Phylum: Arthropoda
- Class: Insecta
- Order: Coleoptera
- Suborder: Polyphaga
- Infraorder: Elateriformia
- Family: Elateridae
- Genus: Zorochros
- Species: Z. dermestoides

Binomial name
- Zorochros dermestoides (Herbst, 1806)

= Zorochros dermestoides =

Species of beetle

Zorochros dermestoides is a species of beetle belonging to the family Elateridae.

It is native to Europe.

Synonyms:

- Zorochros minimus (Lacordaire, 1835)
