= Drapetes =

Drapetes may refer to:

- Drapetes (beetle), a beetle genus in the family Elateridae
- Drapetes (plant), a plant genus in the family Thymelaeaceae
