= Physodactylinae =

Scientific classification
- Domain: Eukaryota
- Kingdom: Animalia
- Phylum: Arthropoda
- Class: Insecta
- Order: Coleoptera
- Suborder: Polyphaga
- Infraorder: Elateriformia
- Family: Elateridae
- Subfamily: Physodactylinae; Lacordaire, 1857

Subfamily of click beetles

Physodactylinae is a subfamily of click beetles in the family Elateridae. There are at least two genera in Physodactylinae.

== Genera ==
These two genera belong to the subfamily Physodactylinae:

- Dactylophysus Fleutiaux, 1892
- Physodactylus Fischer von Waldheim, 1823
