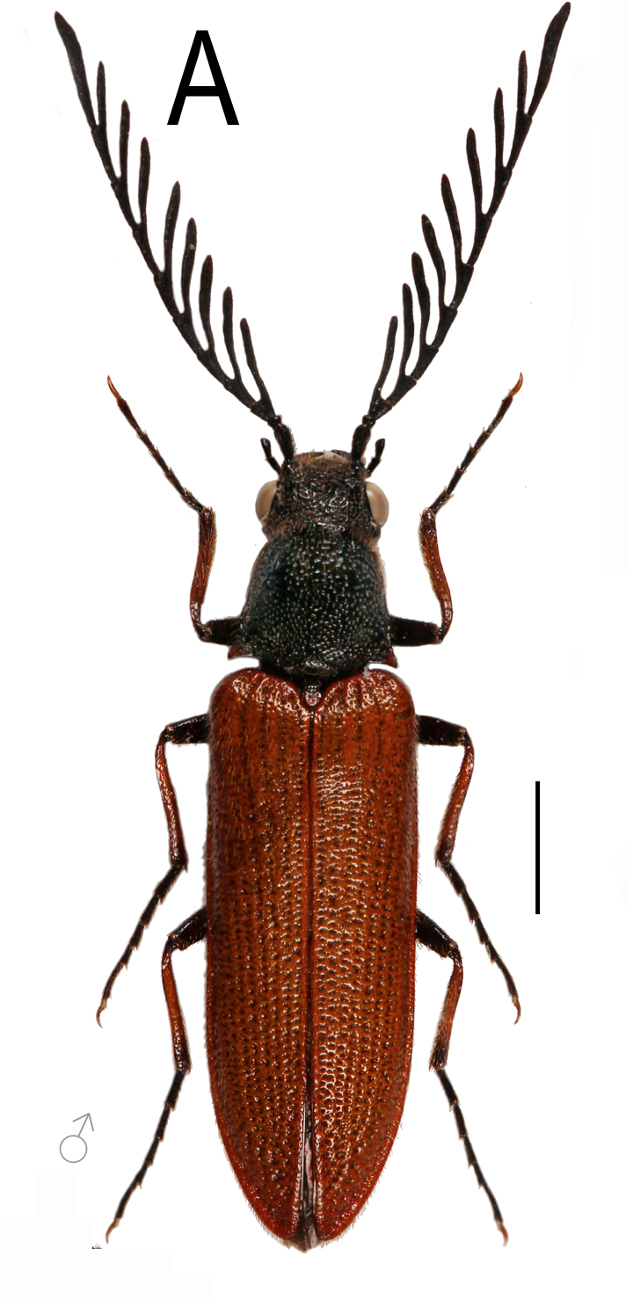
- Plastocerus angulosus, male

Scientific classification
- Kingdom: Animalia
- Phylum: Arthropoda
- Clade: Pancrustacea
- Class: Insecta
- Order: Coleoptera
- Suborder: Polyphaga
- Infraorder: Elateriformia
- Family: Elateridae
- Subfamily: Dendrometrinae
- Tribe: Plastocerini
- Genus: Plastocerus; Schaum, 1852

Synonyms
- Ceroplastus Heyden, 1883; Pseudophyllocerus Reitter, 1896; Cladocerus Schwarz, 1902; Binhon Pic, 1922

= Plastocerus =

Genus of insects

Plastocerus is a genus of click beetles, the sole member of the tribe Plastocerini. While it has historically often been ranked as a family, the genus is now placed firmly within the Elateridae family.

== Species ==
- Plastocerus angulosus (Germar, 1844)
- Plastocerus thoracicus Fleutiaux, 1918
