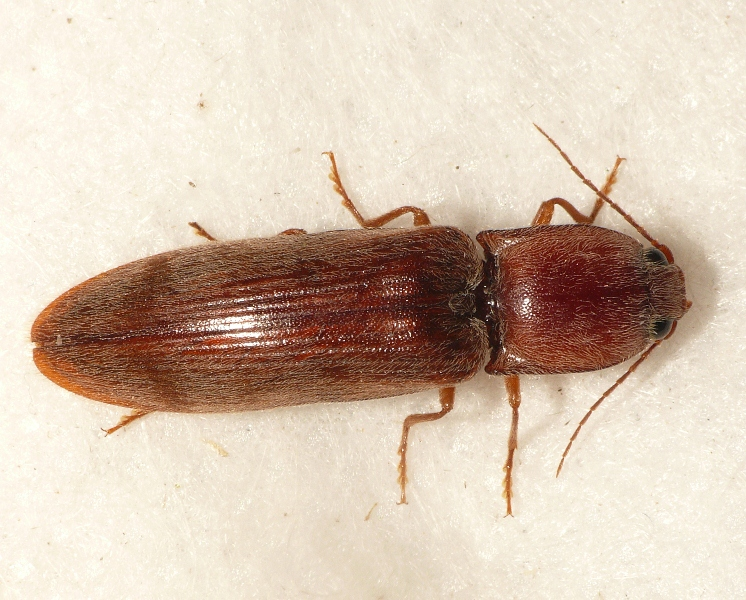
- Stenagostus rhombus, a member of the stenagostus genus.

Scientific classification
- Domain: Eukaryota
- Kingdom: Animalia
- Phylum: Arthropoda
- Class: Insecta
- Order: Coleoptera
- Suborder: Polyphaga
- Infraorder: Elateriformia
- Family: Elateridae
- Genus: Stenagostus; Thomson, 1859

= Stenagostus =

Genus of beetles

Stenagostus is a genus of beetles belonging to the family Elateridae.

The species of this genus are found in Europe and Japan.

Species:

- Stenagostus horioi
- Stenagostus laufferi (Reitter, 1904)
- Stenagostus rhombeus (Olivier, 1790)
- Stenagostus rufus (De Geer, 1774)
- Stenagostus sardiniensis (Reitter 1914)

== Reference Images ==
=== Stenagostus rufus ===
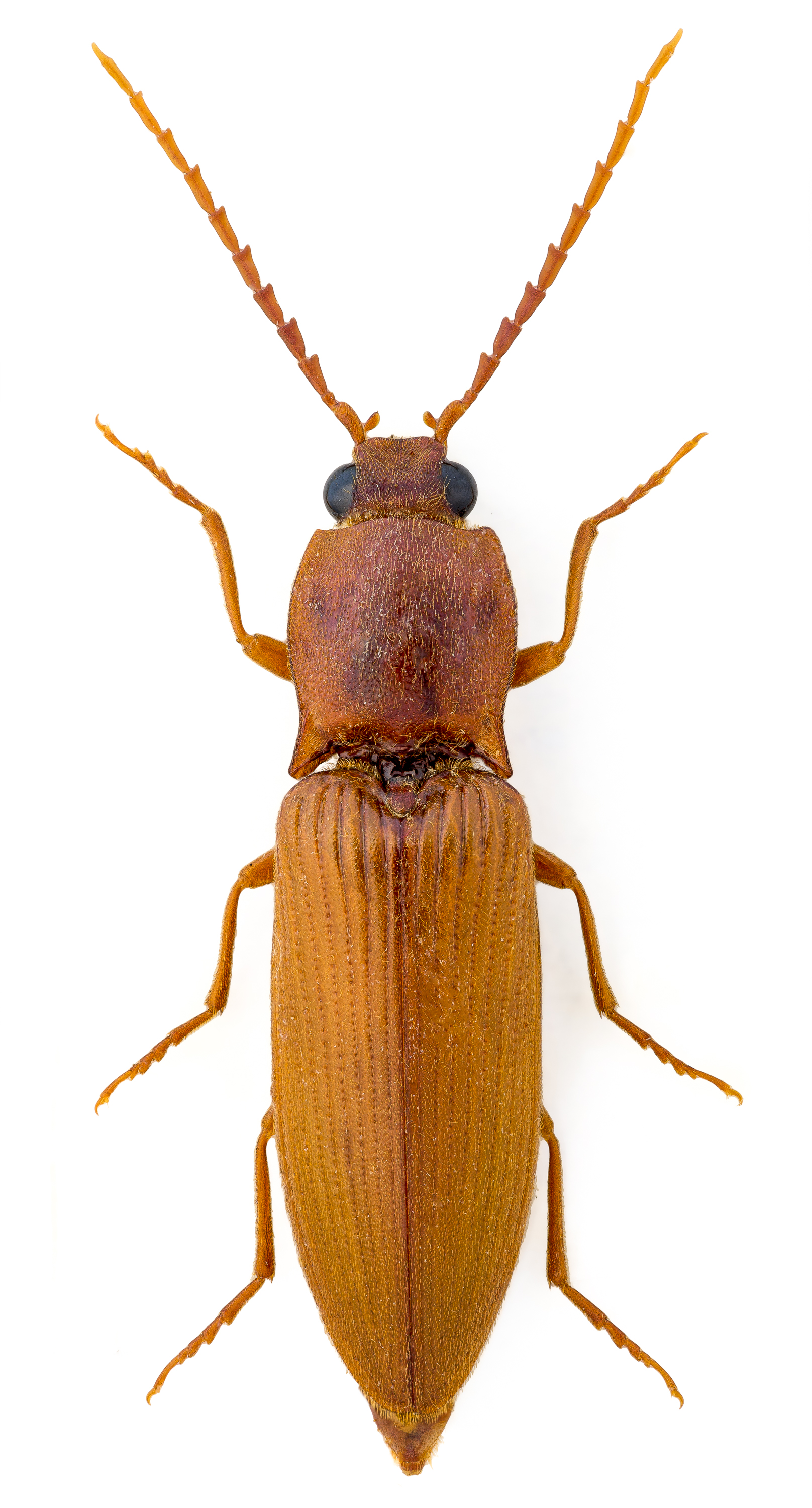

=== Stenagostus rhombeus ===
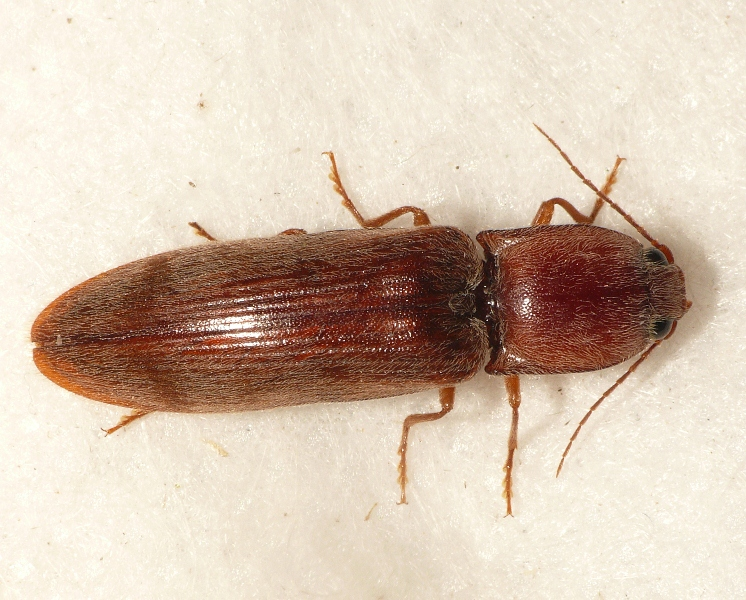
