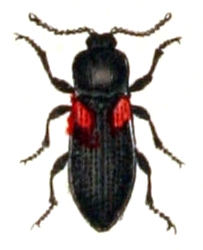
- Calambus

Scientific classification
- Domain: Eukaryota
- Kingdom: Animalia
- Phylum: Arthropoda
- Class: Insecta
- Order: Coleoptera
- Suborder: Polyphaga
- Infraorder: Elateriformia
- Family: Elateridae
- Genus: Calambus; Thomson, 1859

= Calambus =

Genus of beetles

Calambus is a genus of beetles belonging to the family Elateridae.

The genus was first described by Thomson in 1859.

The species of this genus are found in Europe and Japan.

Species:

- Calambus bipustulatus (Linnaeus, 1767)
