= Subprotelater =

Scientific classification
- Domain: Eukaryota
- Kingdom: Animalia
- Phylum: Arthropoda
- Class: Insecta
- Order: Coleoptera
- Suborder: Polyphaga
- Infraorder: Elateriformia
- Family: Elateridae
- Subfamily: Subprotelaterinae
- Genus: Subprotelater; Fleutiaux, 1916

Genus of click beetles

Subprotelater is a genus of click beetles in the family Elateridae, the sole genus of the subfamily Subprotelaterinae. There are at least two described species in Subprotelater.

== Species ==
These two species belong to the genus Subprotelater:

- Subprotelater hisamatsui
- Subprotelater japonicus
