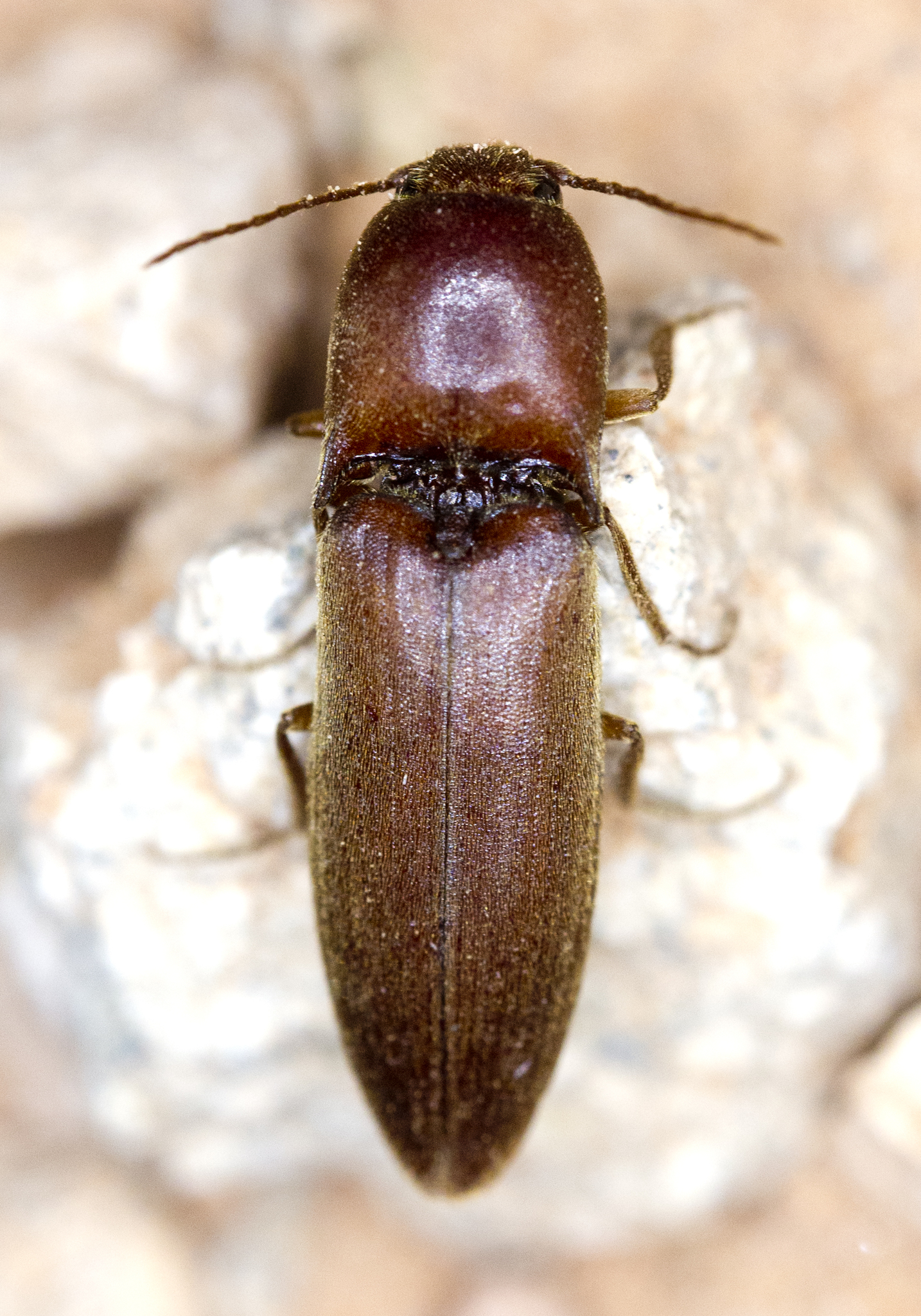
- Mulsanteus substriatus, Utah

Scientific classification
- Domain: Eukaryota
- Kingdom: Animalia
- Phylum: Arthropoda
- Class: Insecta
- Order: Coleoptera
- Suborder: Polyphaga
- Infraorder: Elateriformia
- Family: Elateridae
- Genus: Mulsanteus; Gozis, 1875

Synonyms
- Amblignatus Fleutiaux, 1907; Amblygnathus Solier, 1851; Genomecus Solier, 1851; Nairus Iablokoff-Khnzorian, 1974; Neotrichophorus Jakobson, 1913; Neotricophorus Miwa, 1929; Neotrihophorus Dolin, 1976; Niotrichophorus Miwa, 1934; Trichopherus Britton, 1920; Trichophorus Mulsant & Godart, 1853

= Mulsanteus =

Genus of beetles

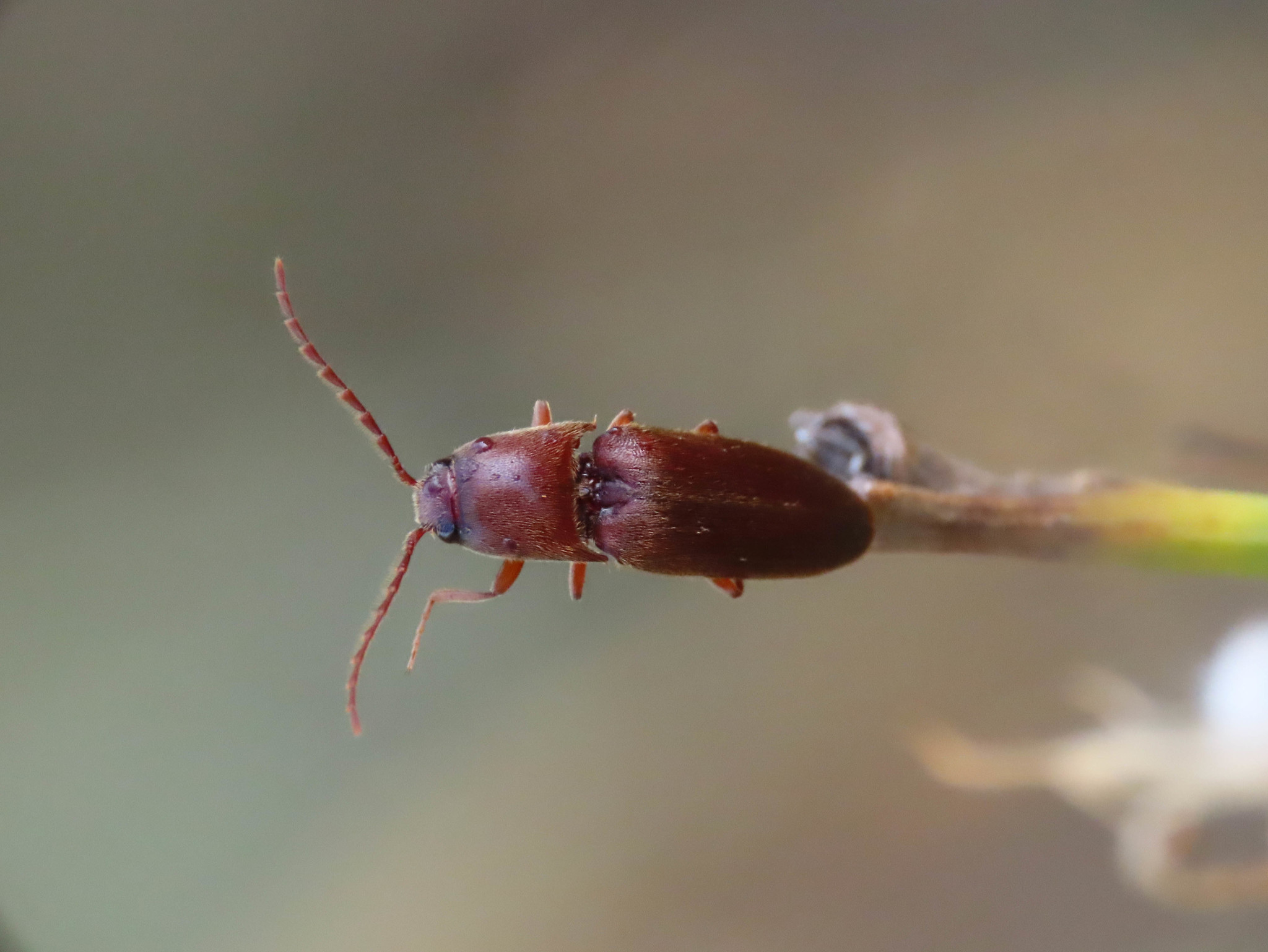
Mulsanteus guillebeaui, Italy

Mulsanteus is a genus in the click beetle family Elateridae. There are at least more than 90 described species in Mulsanteus.

== Species ==
These species belong to the genus Mulsanteus:

- Mulsanteus abdominalis (Solier, 1851)
- Mulsanteus adanensis (Schimmel, 2009)
- Mulsanteus aemulus (Candèze, 1891)
- Mulsanteus anchastinus (Candèze, 1882)
- Mulsanteus antennatus (Candèze, 1897)
- Mulsanteus arizonensis (Schaeffer, 1916)
- Mulsanteus bicolor (Ball & Maddison, 1987)
- Mulsanteus bonifacyi (Fleutiaux, 1918)
- Mulsanteus borneoensis (Ôhira, 1973)
- Mulsanteus braziliensis (Ball & Maddison, 1987)
- Mulsanteus brevis (Candèze, 1878)
- Mulsanteus breviusculus (Champion, 1896)
- Mulsanteus brignolii (Schimmel & Tarnawski, 2007)
- Mulsanteus brunnipilis (Candèze, 1863)
- Mulsanteus cambodiensis Schimmel & Tarnawski, 2007
- Mulsanteus carolinensis (Schaeffer, 1916)
- Mulsanteus crassus (Candèze, 1863)
- Mulsanteus cylindricollis (Champion, 1896)
- Mulsanteus darlingtoni (Ball & Maddison, 1987)
- Mulsanteus depressus (Champion, 1896)
- Mulsanteus dilaticollis (Fairmaire, 1883)
- Mulsanteus dux (Iablokov-Khnzorian, 1974)
- Mulsanteus erubescens (Candèze, 1878)
- Mulsanteus evansi (Ball & Maddison, 1987)
- Mulsanteus foldvarii Platia & Schimmel, 2007
- Mulsanteus fricki (Ball & Maddison, 1987)
- Mulsanteus geminatus (Ball & Maddison, 1987)
- Mulsanteus germanus (Candèze, 1894)
- Mulsanteus gigas (Ball & Maddison, 1987)
- Mulsanteus gilvipes (Ball & Maddison, 1987)
- Mulsanteus godawariensis Schimmel & Tarnawski, 2007
- Mulsanteus gracilipes (Candèze, 1893)
- Mulsanteus grandis (Faldermann, 1836)
- Mulsanteus guillebeaui (Mulsant & Godart, 1853)
- Mulsanteus hartmanni Schimmel & Tarnawski, 2007
- Mulsanteus havaniensis (Candèze, 1863)
- Mulsanteus hirsutus (Candèze, 1863)
- Mulsanteus hirtellus (Candèze, 1863)
- Mulsanteus hirticornis (Candèze, 1893)
- Mulsanteus holzschuhi Schimmel & Tarnawski, 2007
- Mulsanteus hubeiensis Schimmel & Tarnawski, 2007
- Mulsanteus illotipes (Candèze, 1863)
- Mulsanteus ingridae Schimmel & Tarnawski, 2007
- Mulsanteus interior (Ball & Maddison, 1987)
- Mulsanteus irianjayensis Schimmel & Tarnawski, 2007
- Mulsanteus isthmicus (Champion, 1896)
- Mulsanteus junior (Candèze, 1873)
- Mulsanteus kahramanensis (Schimmel, 2009)
- Mulsanteus kalabzai Mertlik & Dusanek, 2006
- Mulsanteus kubani Schimmel & Tarnawski, 2007
- Mulsanteus langtangensis Schimmel & Tarnawski, 2007
- Mulsanteus linteatus (Candèze, 1873)
- Mulsanteus longicornis (Fleutiaux, 1936)
- Mulsanteus lucidus (Candèze, 1865)
- Mulsanteus malaisei (Fleutiaux, 1942)
- Mulsanteus manuelae (Platia & Gudenzi, 1998)
- Mulsanteus melanotoides (Fleutiaux, 1940)
- Mulsanteus murenus Schimmel & Tarnawski, 2007
- Mulsanteus nepalensis Schimmel & Tarnawski, 2007
- Mulsanteus nigricollis (Champion, 1896)
- Mulsanteus panamensis (Ball & Maddison, 1987)
- Mulsanteus pedongensis Schimmel & Tarnawski, 2007
- Mulsanteus pejchai Schimmel & Tarnawski, 2007
- Mulsanteus peregovitsi Platia & Schimmel, 2007
- Mulsanteus peruanus (Schwarz, 1903)
- Mulsanteus phillipsi (Van Zwaluwenburg, 1936)
- Mulsanteus physorhinus (Candèze, 1863)
- Mulsanteus platiai Schimmel & Tarnawski, 2007
- Mulsanteus plebejus (Candeze)
- Mulsanteus pokharanus Schimmel & Tarnawski, 2007
- Mulsanteus portulinensis Schimmel & Tarnawski, 2007
- Mulsanteus reichardti (Ball & Maddison, 1987)
- Mulsanteus riesei Schimmel & Tarnawski, 2007
- Mulsanteus rubicundus (Candèze, 1893)
- Mulsanteus rubuginosus (Ôhira, 1966)
- Mulsanteus ruficollis (Solier, 1851)
- Mulsanteus rufipes (Candèze, 1863)
- Mulsanteus rugosus (Fleutiaux, 1918)
- Mulsanteus sausai Schimmel & Tarnawski, 2007
- Mulsanteus schaumi (Candèze, 1882)
- Mulsanteus shaanxiensis Schimmel & Tarnawski, 2007
- Mulsanteus shirozui (Ôhira, 1966)
- Mulsanteus sikkimensis Schimmel & Tarnawski, 2007
- Mulsanteus subopacus (Champion, 1896)
- Mulsanteus subsericeus (Candèze, 1863)
- Mulsanteus substriatus (Schaeffer, 1916)
- Mulsanteus texanus (LeConte, 1853)
- Mulsanteus tikal (Ball & Maddison, 1987)
- Mulsanteus tropicalis (Champion, 1896)
- Mulsanteus turanicus (Reitter, 1887)
- Mulsanteus variatus (Schaeffer, 1916)
- Mulsanteus weigeli Schimmel & Tarnawski, 2007
- Mulsanteus whiteheadi (Ball & Maddison, 1987)
- Mulsanteus woodruffi (Ball & Maddison, 1987)
- Mulsanteus wudangshanensis Schimmel & Tarnawski, 2007
- Mulsanteus xingu (Ball & Maddison, 1987)
