= Procraerus =

Scientific classification
- Kingdom: Animalia
- Phylum: Arthropoda
- Class: Insecta
- Order: Coleoptera
- Suborder: Polyphaga
- Infraorder: Elateriformia
- Family: Elateridae
- Genus: Procraerus; Reitter, 1905

Genus of beetles

Procraerus is a genus of beetles belonging to the family Elateridae.

Species:

- Procraerus agriotides Schimmel, 2003
- Procraerus angustus Schimmel, 2003
- Procraerus assamensis Schimmel, 2003
