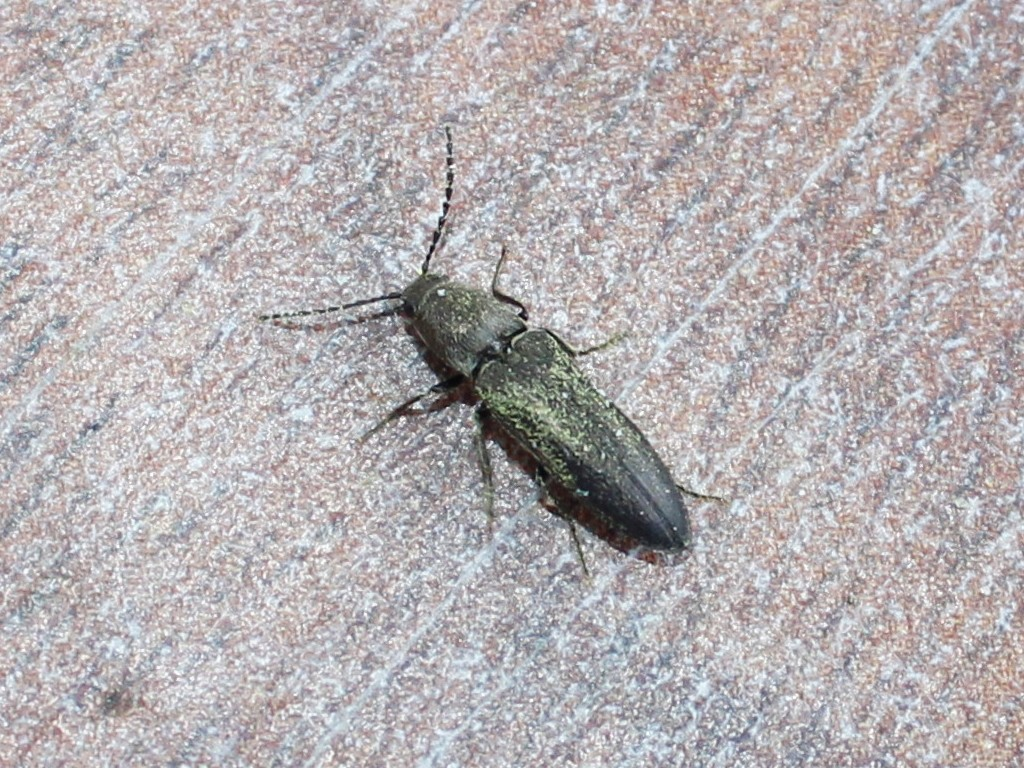
- Crepidophorus

Scientific classification
- Domain: Eukaryota
- Kingdom: Animalia
- Phylum: Arthropoda
- Class: Insecta
- Order: Coleoptera
- Suborder: Polyphaga
- Infraorder: Elateriformia
- Family: Elateridae
- Genus: Crepidophorus; Mulsant & Guillebeau, 1853

= Crepidophorus =

Genus of beetles

Crepidophorus is a genus of beetles belonging to the family Elateridae.

The species of this genus are found in Europe and Korea.

Species:

- Crepidophorus bangtaesanensis
- Crepidophorus mutilatus (Rosenhauer, 1847)
