= Paracardiophorus =

Scientific classification
- Domain: Eukaryota
- Kingdom: Animalia
- Phylum: Arthropoda
- Class: Insecta
- Order: Coleoptera
- Suborder: Polyphaga
- Infraorder: Elateriformia
- Family: Elateridae
- Genus: Paracardiophorus; Schwarz, 1895

Genus of insects

Paracardiophorus is a genus of beetles belonging to the family Elateridae.

The species of this genus are found in Europe, Japan, Australia and Northern America.

Species:

- Paracardiophorus carduelis (Candeze, 1865)
