= Oestodinae =

Scientific classification
- Domain: Eukaryota
- Kingdom: Animalia
- Phylum: Arthropoda
- Class: Insecta
- Order: Coleoptera
- Suborder: Polyphaga
- Infraorder: Elateriformia
- Family: Elateridae
- Subfamily: Oestodinae

Subfamily of beetles

Oestodinae is a subfamily of click beetles in the family Elateridae. There are at least two genera in Oestodinae.

== Genera ==
These two genera belong to the subfamily Oestodinae:

- Bladus Leconte, 1861
- Oestodes Leconte, 1853
