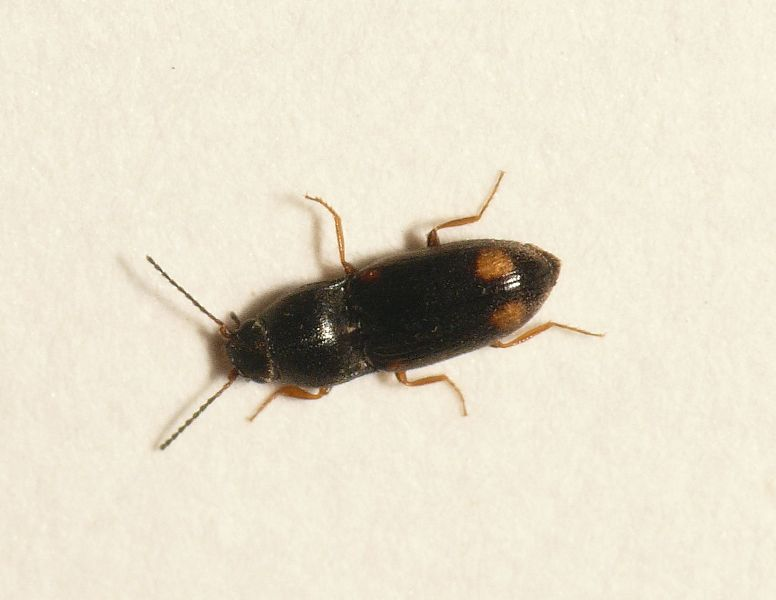
- Zorochros dufouri

Scientific classification
- Domain: Eukaryota
- Kingdom: Animalia
- Phylum: Arthropoda
- Class: Insecta
- Order: Coleoptera
- Suborder: Polyphaga
- Infraorder: Elateriformia
- Family: Elateridae
- Subfamily: Negastriinae
- Genus: Zorochros; Thomson, 1859

Synonyms
- Zorochrus Thomson, 1864 (misspelling)

= Zorochros =

Genus of beetles

Zorochros is a genus of click beetles, found chiefly in sand on the banks of rivers and streams. There are 40 described species belonging to the genus, most of which are native to Eurasia.

== Selected species ==
- Zorochros coreanus Han, Park I.G. & Park H, 2015
- Zorochros dermestoides Herbst, 1806
- Zorochros dufouri Buysson, 1900
- Zorochros iranicus Dolin, 2002
- Zorochros mansusanensis Han, Park I.G. & Park H, 2015
- Zorochros mesasiaticus Dolin, 1995
- Zorochros titanus Dolin & Cate 1998
- Zorochros yosrae Al Dhafer & Wells, 2016
