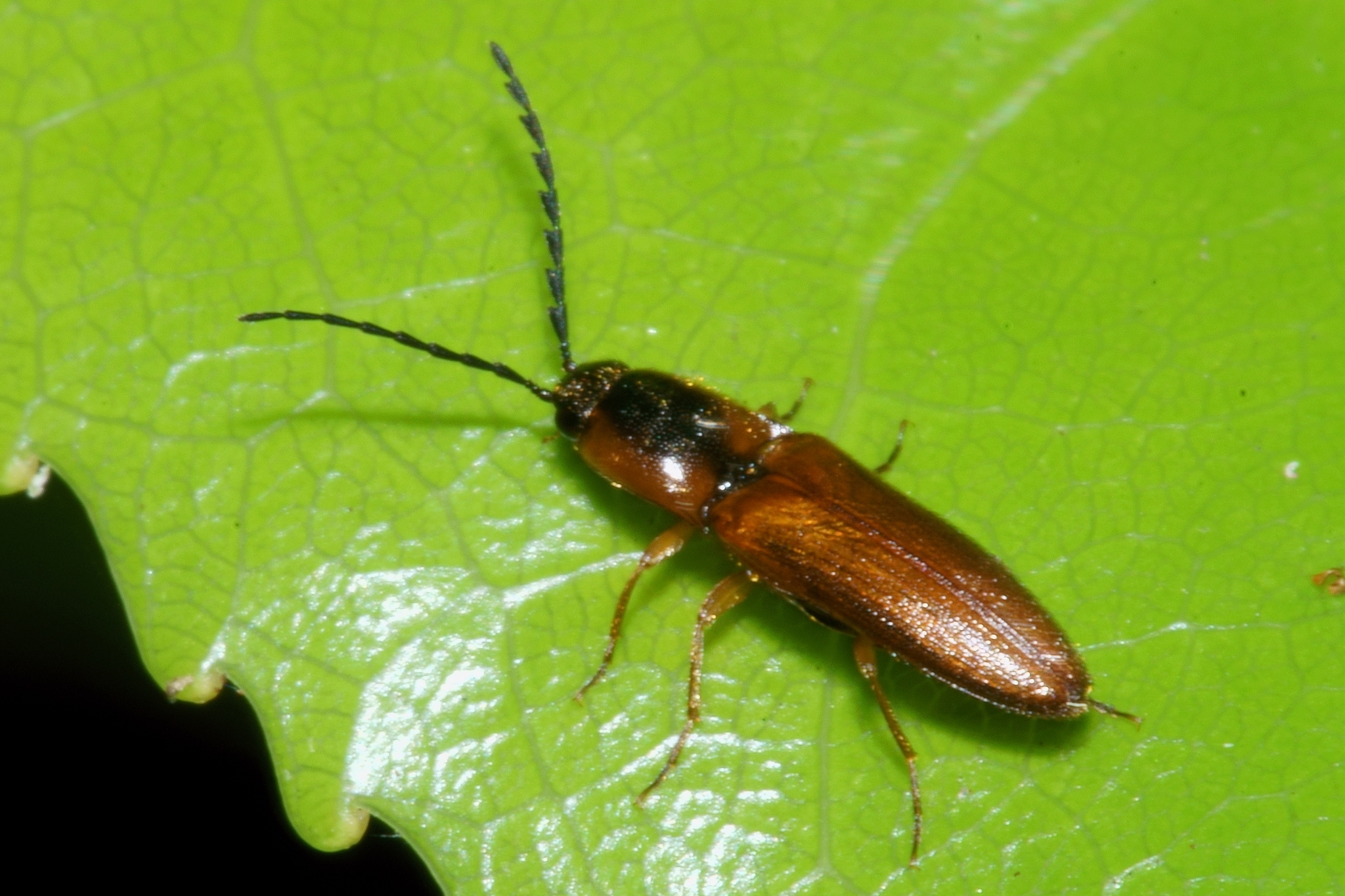
- Sphaenelater lineicollis

Scientific classification
- Kingdom: Animalia
- Phylum: Arthropoda
- Class: Insecta
- Order: Coleoptera
- Suborder: Polyphaga
- Infraorder: Elateriformia
- Family: Elateridae
- Subfamily: Lissominae; Laporte, 1835

= Lissominae =

Subfamily of beetles

Lissominae is a subfamily of click beetles in the family Elateridae. There are about 11 genera in Lissominae.

== Genera ==
These 11 genera belong to the subfamily Lissominae:

- Anaspasis Candèze, 1882
- Austrelater Calder & Lawrence, 1993
- Drapetes Dejean, 1821
- Hypochaetes Bonvouloir, 1859
- Lissomus Dalman, 1824
- Osslimus Calder, 1996
- Paradrapetes Fleutiaux, 1895
- Protelater Sharp, 1877
- Sphaenelater Schwarz, 1902
- Tunon Arias-Bohart, 2013
- Valdivelater Lawrence & Arias, 2009
