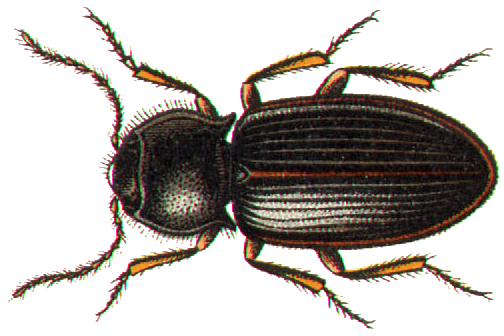

Scientific classification
- Kingdom: Animalia
- Phylum: Arthropoda
- Class: Insecta
- Order: Coleoptera
- Suborder: Polyphaga
- Infraorder: Elateriformia
- Family: Elateridae
- Genus: Dima; Charpentier, 1825

= Dima (beetle) =

Genus of beetles

Dima is a genus of beetles belonging to the family Elateridae.

== Species ==
Dima arndti

Dima assingi

Dima bruhai

Dima dalmatina

Dima dima

Dima dusaneki

Dima elateroides

Dima etoliensis

Dima evritaniensis

Dima florinensis

Dima fthiotidensis

Dima giachinoi

Dima hirtipennis

Dima hladilorum

Dima fialai

Dima isabellae

Dima kozufensis

Dima lebenbaueri

Dima macedonica

Dima marvani

Dima moraveci

Dima neumanni

Dima olympica

Dima orientalis

Dima parnonensis

Dima pecoudi

Dima pelikani

Dima pelionensis

Dima raineri

Dima schimmeli

Dima schnitteri

Dima vailatii

Dima vonickai

Dima zbuzeki
