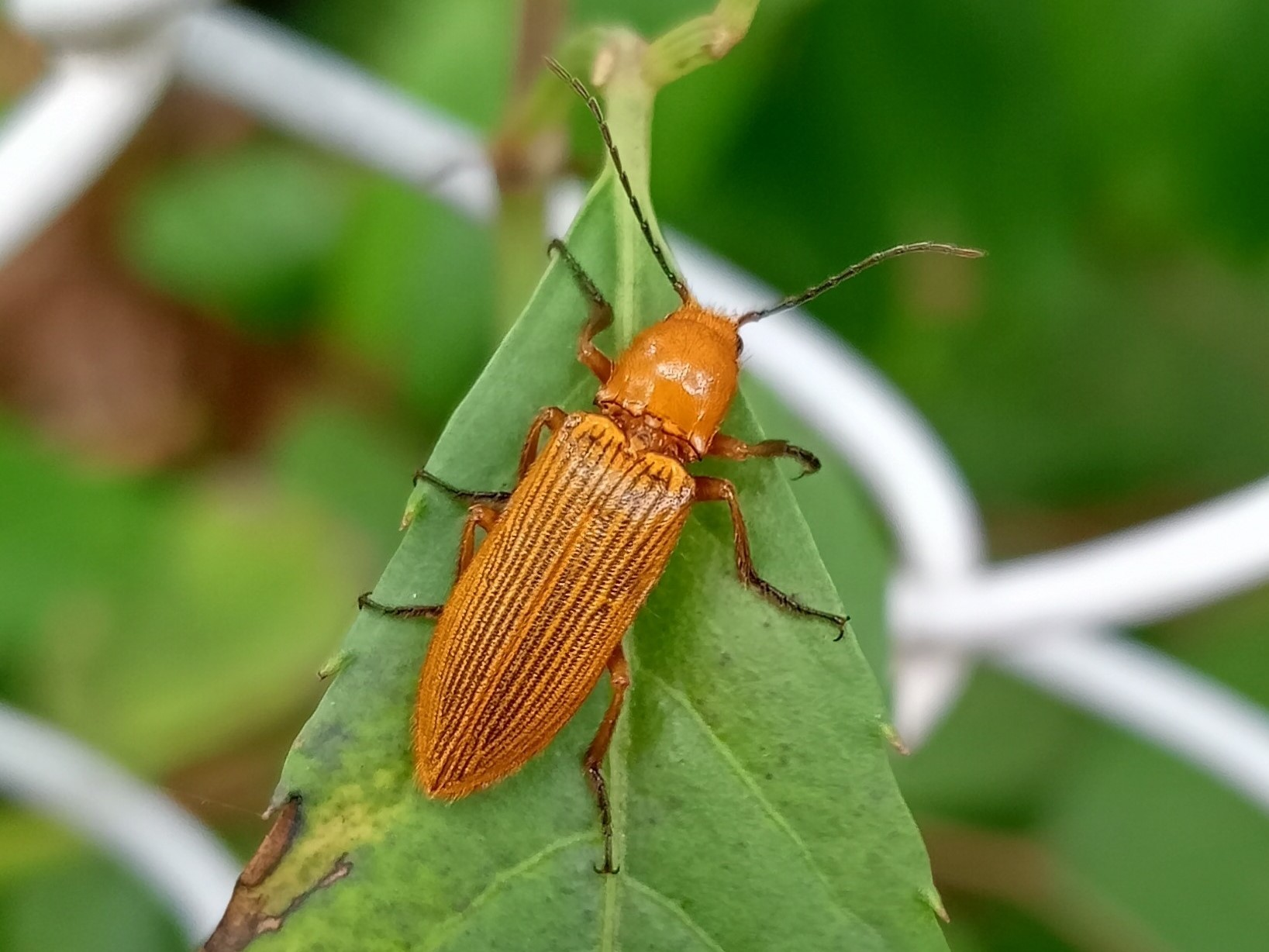
- Hemiops flava

Scientific classification
- Domain: Eukaryota
- Kingdom: Animalia
- Phylum: Arthropoda
- Class: Insecta
- Order: Coleoptera
- Suborder: Polyphaga
- Infraorder: Elateriformia
- Family: Elateridae
- Subfamily: Hemiopinae; Fleutiaux, 1941

= Hemiopinae =

Subfamily of beetles

Hemiopinae is a subfamily of click beetles in the family Elateridae. There are at least four genera in Hemiopinae.

== Genera ==
These four genera belong to the subfamily Hemiopinae:

- Exoeolus Broun, 1893
- Hemiops Laporte, 1838
- Legna Walker, 1858
- Parhemiops Candèze, 1878
