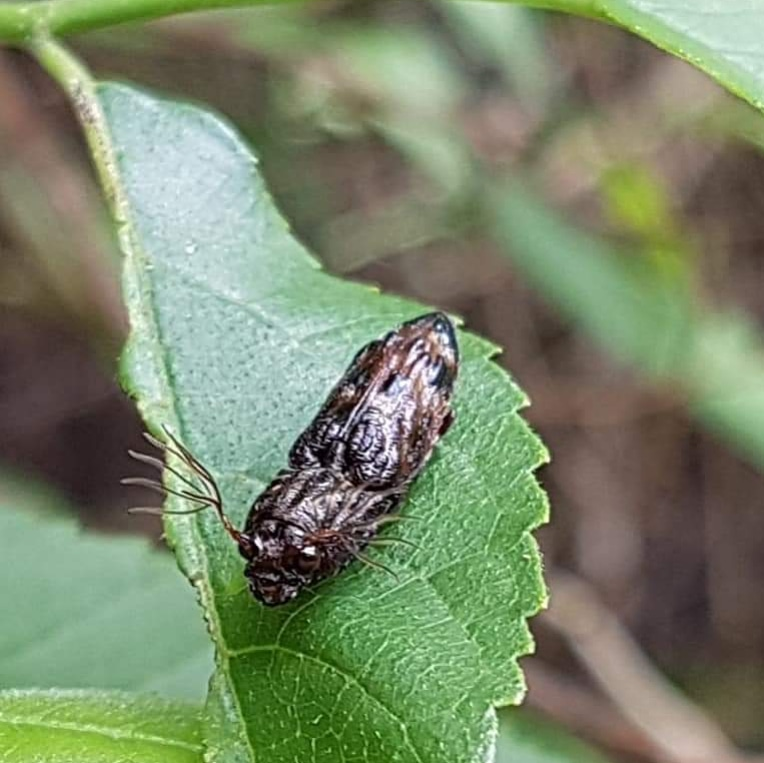
- Balgus tuberculosus

Scientific classification
- Domain: Eukaryota
- Kingdom: Animalia
- Phylum: Arthropoda
- Class: Insecta
- Order: Coleoptera
- Suborder: Polyphaga
- Infraorder: Elateriformia
- Family: Elateridae
- Subfamily: Thylacosterninae
- Genus: Balgus; Fleutiaux, 1920

Species
- see text

= Balgus =

Genus of beetles

Balgus is a genus of Central American click beetle (family Elateridae). They are one of several genera in the family which contain at least one bioluminescent species. The genus was originally placed in the family Eucnemidae, later transferred to Throscidae, but recent classifications establish them firmly within Elateridae.

== Species ==
- Balgus albofasciatus (Bonvouloir, 1875)
- Balgus egaensis (Bonvouloir, 1875) [= "eganensis"]
- Balgus eschscholtzi (Laporte, 1835)
- Balgus humilis (Bonvouloir, 1875)
- Balgus obconicus (Bonvouloir, 1875)
- Balgus rugosus (Blanchard, 1843)
- Balgus schnusei (Heller, 1914)
- Balgus subfasciatus (Bonvouloir, 1875)
- Balgus tuberculosus (Dalman, 1823) - type species (as Melasis tuberculosa Dalman)
