= Orithales =

Scientific classification
- Kingdom: Animalia
- Phylum: Arthropoda
- Class: Insecta
- Order: Coleoptera
- Suborder: Polyphaga
- Infraorder: Elateriformia
- Family: Elateridae
- Genus: Orithales; Kiesenwetter, 1858

Genus of beetles

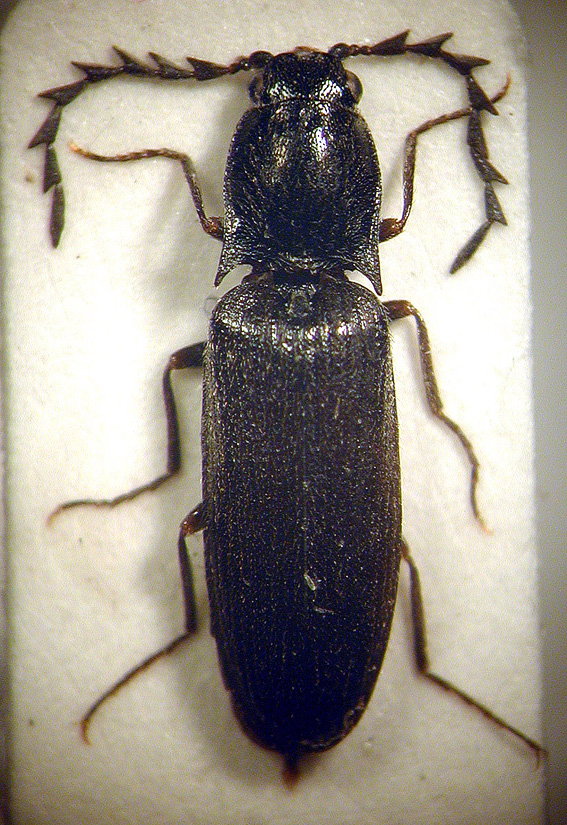
Orithales serraticornis specimen

Orithales is a genus of beetles belonging to the family Elateridae.

The species of this genus are found in Europe.

Species:

- Orithales serraticornis (Paykull, 1800)
