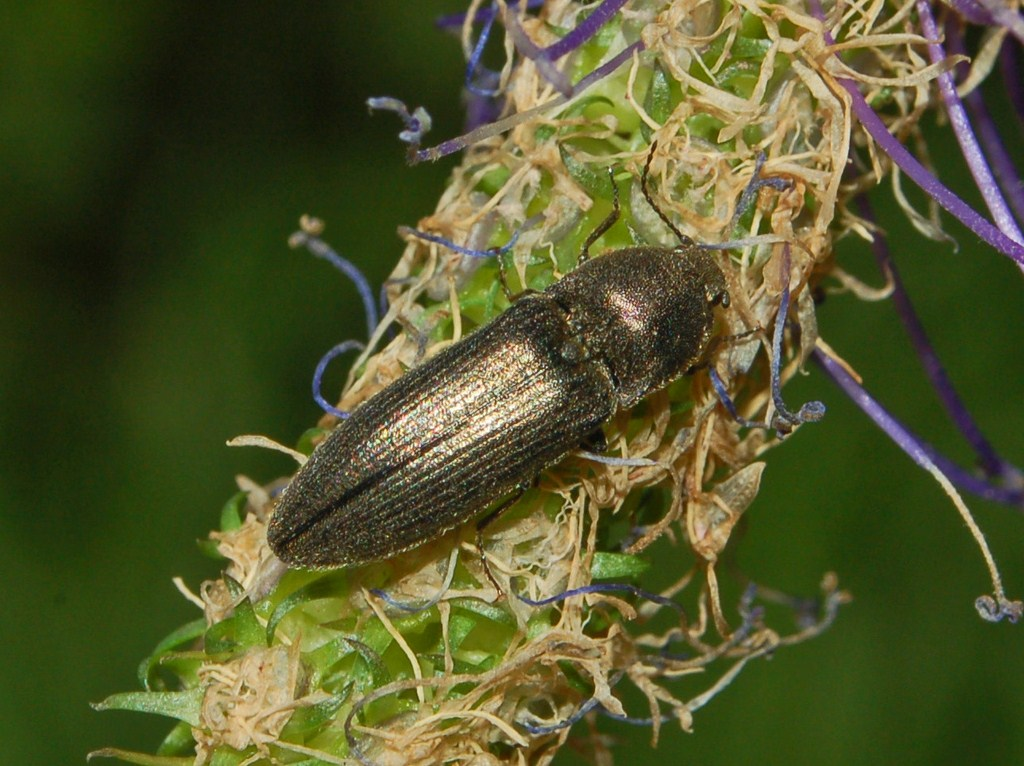
- Cidnopus pilosus

Scientific classification
- Domain: Eukaryota
- Kingdom: Animalia
- Phylum: Arthropoda
- Class: Insecta
- Order: Coleoptera
- Suborder: Polyphaga
- Infraorder: Elateriformia
- Family: Elateridae
- Genus: Cidnopus; Thomson, 1859

= Cidnopus =

Genus of beetles

Cidnopus is a genus of click beetle belonging to the family Elateridae subfamily Dendrometrinae.

== Species ==
Species within this genus include:

- Cidnopus aeruginosus (A. G. Olivier, 1790)
- Cidnopus crassipes (Schwarz, 1900)
- Cidnopus hubeiensis Kishii & Jiang, 1996
- Cidnopus koltzei (Reitter, 1895)
- Cidnopus macedonicus Cate & Platia, 1989
- Cidnopus marginellus (Perris, 1864)
- Cidnopus marginipennis (Lewis, 1894)
- Cidnopus obienesis (Cherepanov, 1966)
- Cidnopus parallelus (Motschulsky, 1860)
- Cidnopus pilosus (Leske, 1785)
- Cidnopus platiai Mertlik, 1996
- Cidnopus pseudopilosus Platia & Gudenzi, 1985
- Cidnopus ruzenae (Laibner, 1977)
- Cidnopus schurmanni Platia & Gudenzi, 1998
- Cidnopus scutellaris Dolin, 2003
- Cidnopus turcicus Platia, 2004
