= Synaptus =

Scientific classification
- Domain: Eukaryota
- Kingdom: Animalia
- Phylum: Arthropoda
- Class: Insecta
- Order: Coleoptera
- Suborder: Polyphaga
- Infraorder: Elateriformia
- Family: Elateridae
- Genus: Synaptus; Eschscholtz, 1829

Genus of beetles

Synaptus is a genus of beetles belonging to the family Elateridae.

The species of this genus are found in Europe.

Species:

- Synaptus filiformis (Fabricius, 1781)
