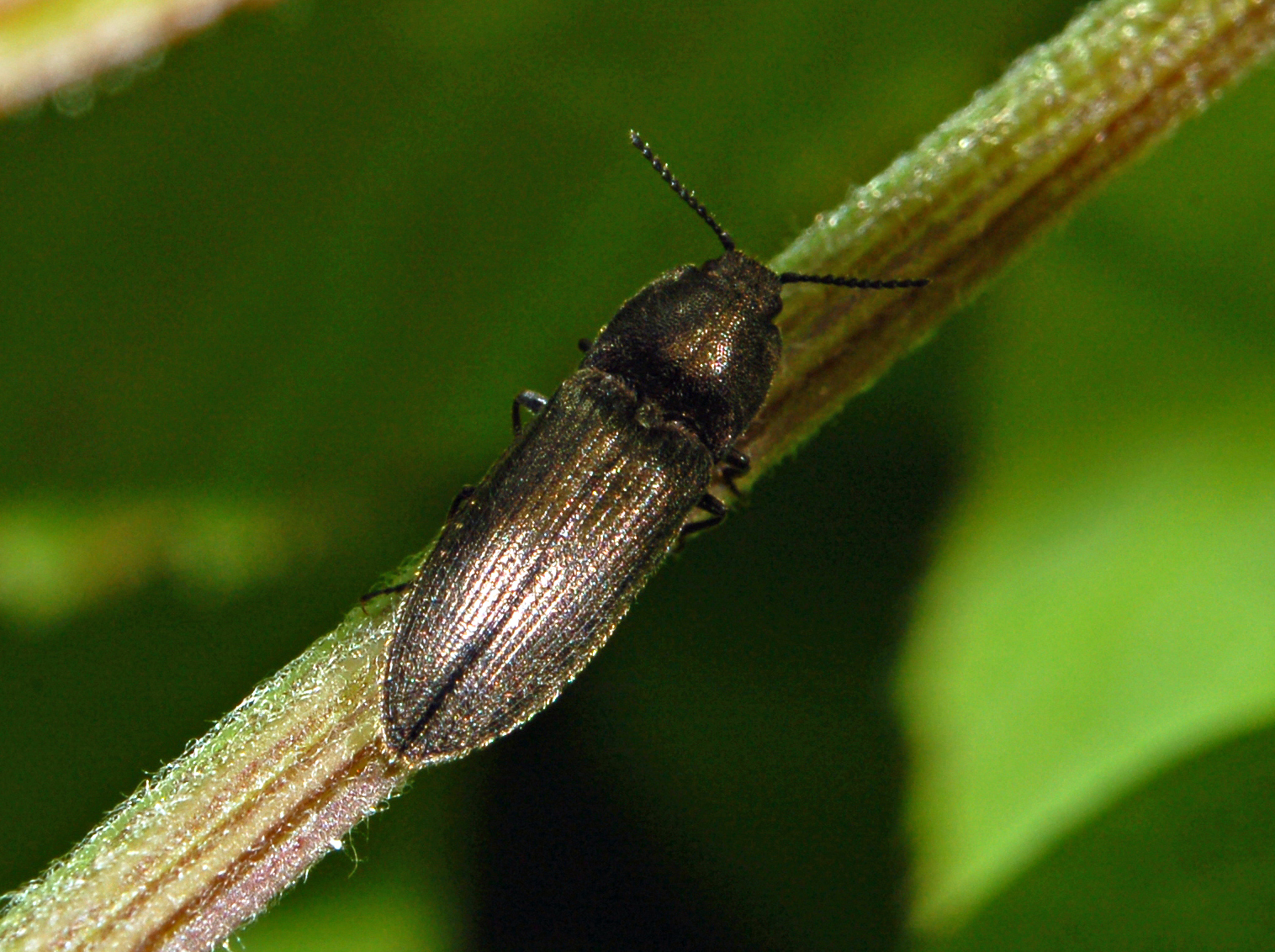
- Dicronychus sp.

Scientific classification
- Kingdom: Animalia
- Phylum: Arthropoda
- Class: Insecta
- Order: Coleoptera
- Suborder: Polyphaga
- Infraorder: Elateriformia
- Family: Elateridae
- Genus: Dicronychus; Brullé, 1832

= Dicronychus =

Genus of beetles

Dicronychus is a genus of click beetle belonging to the family Elateridae.

== Species ==
- Dicronychus abyssinus (Candèze, 1889)
- Dicronychus adanensis (Pic, 1908)
- Dicronychus aenescens Platia & Gudenzi, 2003
- Dicronychus alternatus Schwarz, 1906
- Dicronychus annamensis Fleutiaux, 1931
- Dicronychus antsiranus Fleutiaux, 1933
- Dicronychus apteriformis Platia & Gudenzi, 2004
- Dicronychus asiaticus Fleutiaux, 1931
- Dicronychus asperulus (Candèze, 1860)
- Dicronychus bactrianus (Gurjeva, 1966)
- Dicronychus beauchenei Fleutiaux, 1918
- Dicronychus berrai Platia & Gudenzi, 2003
- Dicronychus bicolor Platia & Gudenzi, 2004
- Dicronychus bicolor Leseigneur, 1958
- Dicronychus blandus Solsky, 1881
- Dicronychus bozdagensis Platia & Gudenzi, 2004
- Dicronychus brancuccii Platia & Schimmel, 1997
- Dicronychus brullei Platia & Gudenzi, 2003
- Dicronychus buettikeri Platia & Schimmel, 1997
- Dicronychus bureschi (Roubal, 1936)
- Dicronychus campadellii Platia & Gudenzi, 2003
- Dicronychus candezei Dumont
- Dicronychus chassaini Platia & Schimmel, 1997
- Dicronychus cinereus (Herbst, 1784)
- Dicronychus conductus (Erichson, 1840)
- Dicronychus confusus Fleutiaux, 1918
- Dicronychus consentaneus (Kollar, 1848)
- Dicronychus crassipes Schwarz
- Dicronychus crassus Fleutiaux, 1932
- Dicronychus cruentipennis Candèze
- Dicronychus dahuricus (Candèze, 1889)
- Dicronychus davidianus (Candèze, 1882)
- Dicronychus decorus (Faldermann, 1835)
- Dicronychus deminutus Platia & Gudenzi, 2004
- Dicronychus dentatus Fleutiaux, 1931
- Dicronychus desbrochersi Platia & Gudenzi, 2004
- Dicronychus devius (Candèze, 1882)
- Dicronychus drurei (Pic, 1908)
- Dicronychus duporti Fleutiaux, 1931
- Dicronychus equiseti (Herbst, 1784)
- Dicronychus equisetioides Lohse, 1976
- Dicronychus exstinctus (Erichson, 1840)
- Dicronychus extractus Fleutiaux, 1931
- Dicronychus falsus Fleutiaux, 1931
- Dicronychus ferrugineus Schwarz
- Dicronychus ferruginosus Platia & Schimmel, 1997
- Dicronychus foveifrons Fairmaire
- Dicronychus freudei Platia & Gudenzi, 2007
- Dicronychus fulvivellus (Candèze, 1860)
- Dicronychus fusivittatus Platia & Gudenzi, 1999
- Dicronychus gedyei Fleutiaux, 1935
- Dicronychus gillerforsi Platia & Gudenzi, 2004
- Dicronychus graingeri Platia & Schimmel, 1997
- Dicronychus grandicollis Fleutiaux, 1935
- Dicronychus granulatus Candèze, 1882
- Dicronychus haematomus Candèze, 1860
- Dicronychus hedenborgii (Candèze, 1860)
- Dicronychus hippanicus (Orlov, 1997)
- Dicronychus hoberlandti Cate, Platia & Schimmel, 2002
- Dicronychus hunti Fleutiaux, 1935
- Dicronychus iconiensis (Pic, 1908)
- Dicronychus illustratus Fleutiaux, 1932
- Dicronychus incanus (Erichson, 1840)
- Dicronychus incostatus Fleutiaux, 1931
- Dicronychus intermedius Platia & Gudenzi, 2003
- Dicronychus involucer Platia & Gudenzi, 2004
- Dicronychus javaneus (Candèze, 1860)
- Dicronychus lactho Fleutiaux, 1940
- Dicronychus larseni Platia & Schimmel, 1997
- Dicronychus latescapulatus (Buysson, 1906)
- Dicronychus littoralis Fleutiaux, 1935
- Dicronychus luciae Laibner, 1985
- Dicronychus macedonicus Platia & Gudenzi, 2003
- Dicronychus maculipennis Fleutiaux, 1918
- Dicronychus mandibularis Candèze, 1882
- Dicronychus marani (Roubal, 1936)
- Dicronychus marginalis (Candèze, 1860)
- Dicronychus martini Platia & Gudenzi, 2003
- Dicronychus mauritanicus (Motschulsky, 1858)
- Dicronychus merkli (Pic, 1910)
- Dicronychus mesopotamicus Platia & Gudenzi, 1999
- Dicronychus militaris Fleutiaux, 1935
- Dicronychus mixtus (Fleutiaux, 1931)
- Dicronychus mossulensis (Pic, 1912)
- Dicronychus mutilus Platia & Gudenzi, 2004
- Dicronychus nebulosus (Motschulsky, 1858)
- Dicronychus nigripennis Fleutiaux, 1933
- Dicronychus nigropunctatus (Motschulsky, 1860)
- Dicronychus obesus (Krynicki, 1832)
- Dicronychus obscuripennis (Pic, 1899)
- Dicronychus omanensis Platia & Schimmel, 1997
- Dicronychus paleatus (Candèze, 1893)
- Dicronychus pallidus Laurent, 1974
- Dicronychus perrieri Fleutiaux, 1933
- Dicronychus perstriatus (Buysson, 1912)
- Dicronychus pici Platia & Gudenzi, 2004
- Dicronychus plumosus Candèze
- Dicronychus psephoides Candèze, 1893
- Dicronychus pseudobesus (Orlov, 1993)
- Dicronychus pseudofebriens Buysson, 1912
- Dicronychus puerulus (Candèze, 1889)
- Dicronychus quadrinaevus Reitter, 1891
- Dicronychus rejafus Fleutiaux, 1935
- Dicronychus rubripennis Fleutiaux, 1935
- Dicronychus rubripes (Germar, 1824)
- Dicronychus rufus Fleutiaux, 1919
- Dicronychus sahlbergi Schwarz, 1900
- Dicronychus schmalfussi Chassain, 1984
- Dicronychus scobis Vats, 1984
- Dicronychus seclusus Fleutiaux, 1935
- Dicronychus senaci (Desbrochers des Loges, 1869)
- Dicronychus separatus Fleutiaux, 1931
- Dicronychus septentrionalis (Fleutiaux, 1931)
- Dicronychus similis Fleutiaux, 1918
- Dicronychus soalalanus Fleutiaux, 1933
- Dicronychus spernendus (Candèze, 1875)
- Dicronychus stolatus Erichson, 1840
- Dicronychus submontanus Vats, 1984
- Dicronychus subparallelus Fleutiaux, 1931
- Dicronychus subulipennis Faldermann, 1835
- Dicronychus talhouki Platia & Schimmel, 1997
- Dicronychus tangensis Fleutiaux
- Dicronychus triangulus Fleutiaux, 1933
- Dicronychus tritus Candèze, 1882
- Dicronychus turcicus Platia & Gudenzi, 2004
- Dicronychus turkmenicus Platia & Gudenzi, 2007
- Dicronychus uniformis Fleutiaux
- Dicronychus vagus Candèze, 1888
- Dicronychus variatus (Desbroches des Loges, 1875)
- Dicronychus variolosus Fleutiaux, 1935
- Dicronychus vaulogeri Fleutiaux, 1931
- Dicronychus versicolor (Mulsant & Guillebeau, 1856)
- Dicronychus wagneri (Pecírka, 1926)
- Dicronychus wittmeri Platia & Schimmel, 1997
