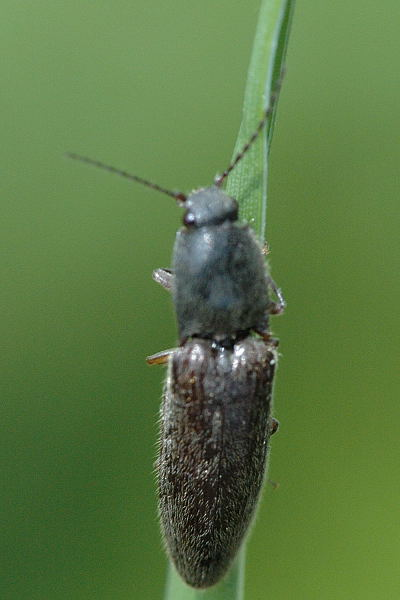
- Aplotarsus

Scientific classification
- Kingdom: Animalia
- Phylum: Arthropoda
- Clade: Pancrustacea
- Class: Insecta
- Order: Coleoptera
- Suborder: Polyphaga
- Infraorder: Elateriformia
- Family: Elateridae
- Genus: Aplotarsus; Stephens, 1830

= Aplotarsus =

Genus of beetles

Aplotarsus is a genus of beetles belonging to the family Elateridae.

The genus was first described by Stephens in 1830.

The species of this genus are found in Europe.

Species:

- Aplotarsus incanus (Gyllenhal, 1827)
