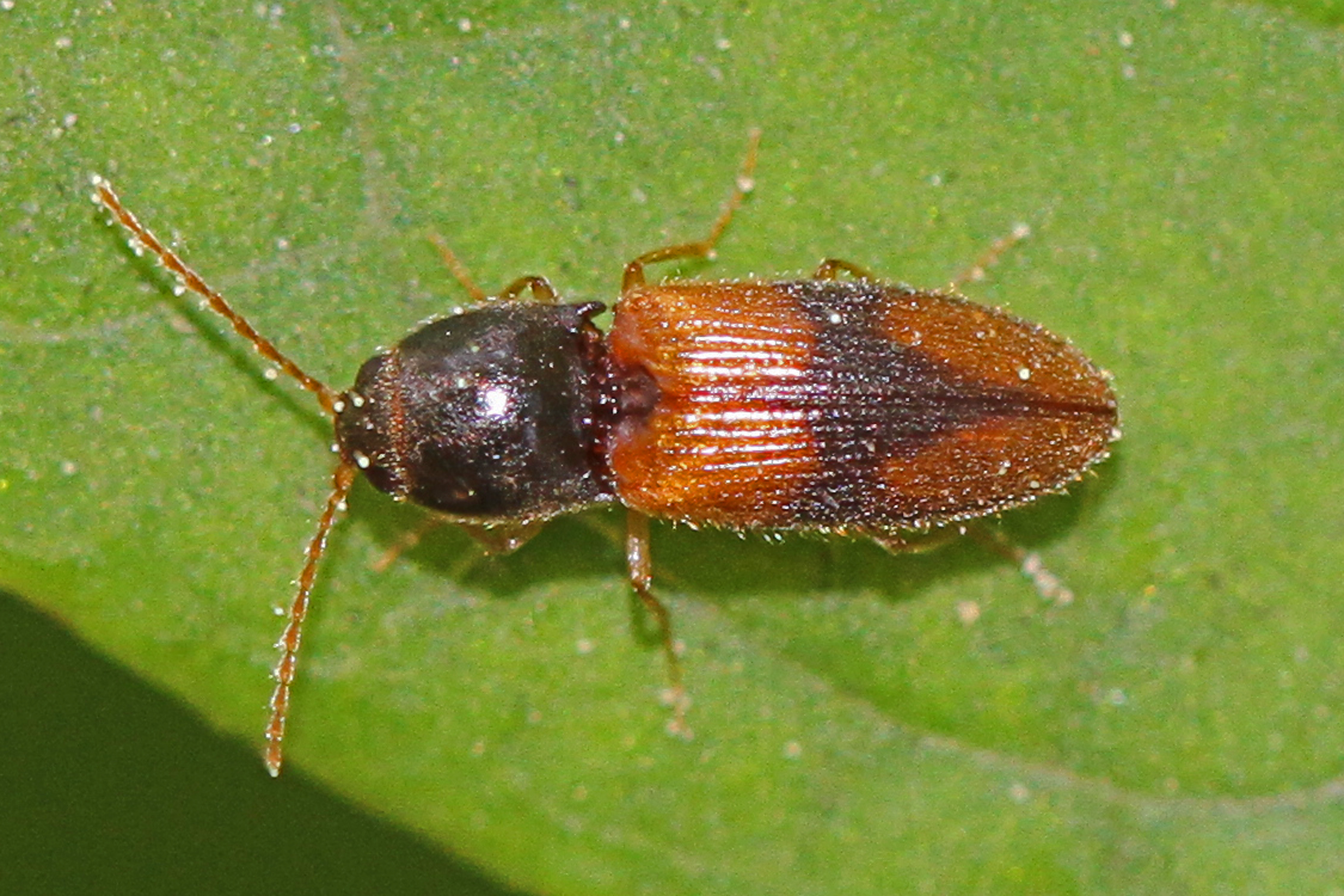
- Horistonotus curiatus

Scientific classification
- Domain: Eukaryota
- Kingdom: Animalia
- Phylum: Arthropoda
- Class: Insecta
- Order: Coleoptera
- Suborder: Polyphaga
- Infraorder: Elateriformia
- Family: Elateridae
- Genus: Horistonotus; Candèze, 1860

= Horistonotus =

Genus of beetles

Horistonotus is a genus of beetles belonging to the family Elateridae.

The species of this genus are found in America.

Species:

- Horistonotus angustifrons Casari, 2011
