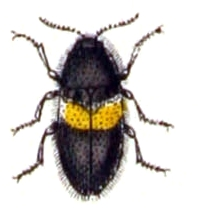
- Drapetes mordelloides

Scientific classification
- Kingdom: Animalia
- Phylum: Arthropoda
- Class: Insecta
- Order: Coleoptera
- Suborder: Polyphaga
- Infraorder: Elateriformia
- Family: Elateridae
- Subfamily: Lissominae
- Genus: Drapetes; Dejean, 1821

Synonyms
- Lissodes Berthold 1827; Paean Gistel 1848; Draptetes Wolcott 1936 (Missp.)

= Drapetes (beetle) =

Genus of beetles

Drapetes is a genus of beetles belonging to the family Elateridae.

The genus has almost cosmopolitan distribution.

== Selected Species ==
- Drapetes abei
- Drapetes advenus
- Drapetes araratensis
- Drapetes aterrimus
- Drapetes bicoloris
- Drapetes bimaculatus
- Drapetes brevicollis
- Drapetes cayennensis
- Drapetes chiricahua
- Drapetes corticalis
- Drapetes crocopus
- Drapetes cruentus
- Drapetes degener
- Drapetes depressus
- Drapetes dorsalis
- Drapetes dubius
- Drapetes ecarinatus
- Drapetes equestris
- Drapetes equiseti
- Drapetes europaeus
- Drapetes exstriatus
- Drapetes flavatus
- Drapetes flavipes
- Drapetes flexuosus
- Drapetes fuscus
- Drapetes griseus
- Drapetes guttatus
- Drapetes haematoceras
- Drapetes heydeni
- Drapetes inunctus
- Drapetes jansoni
- Drapetes kashyapi
- Drapetes laticollis
- Drapetes latus
- Drapetes lineolus
- Drapetes maculatus
- Drapetes maurus
- Drapetes mediorufus
- Drapetes modestus
- Drapetes montanus
- Drapetes mordelloides
- Drapetes niger
- Drapetes nigricans
- Drapetes nigricornis
- Drapetes nigrinus
- Drapetes nigripes
- Drapetes pannus
- Drapetes picipes
- Drapetes plagiatus
- Drapetes planatus
- Drapetes prolifericornis
- Drapetes pullus
- Drapetes purpureus
- Drapetes pygmaeus
- Drapetes quadrifoveatus
- Drapetes quadripustulatus
- Drapetes rotundoextremus
- Drapetes rubricollis
- Drapetes rufipalpis
- Drapetes rufiventris
- Drapetes sanguineus
- Drapetes sellatus
- Drapetes serraticornis
- Drapetes sexmaculatus
- Drapetes signatipennis
- Drapetes signatulus
- Drapetes socialis
- Drapetes spatulatus
- Drapetes spissus
- Drapetes submaculatus
- Drapetes subnivosus
- Drapetes subparallelus
- Drapetes sulcatus
- Drapetes taeniatus
- Drapetes talyshensis
- Drapetes tetraspilotus
- Drapetes thoracicus
- Drapetes torigaii
- Drapetes truncatus
- Drapetes ustulatus
- Drapetes vilis
