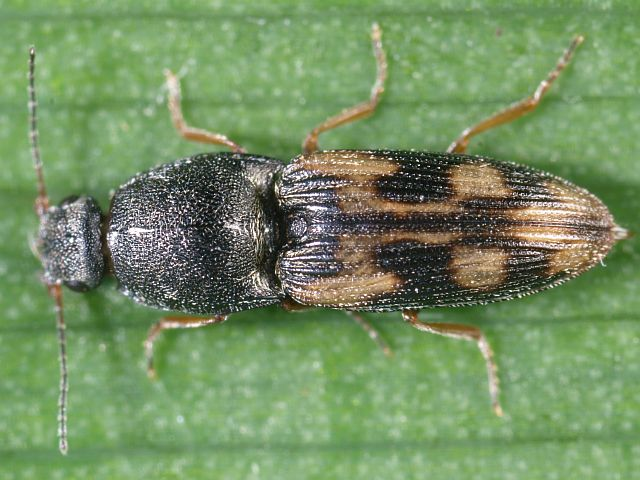
- Negastrius pulchellus

Scientific classification
- Kingdom: Animalia
- Phylum: Arthropoda
- Class: Insecta
- Order: Coleoptera
- Suborder: Polyphaga
- Infraorder: Elateriformia
- Family: Elateridae
- Genus: Negastrius; Thomson, 1859

= Negastrius =

Genus of beetles

Negastrius is a genus of beetles belonging to the family Elateridae.

The species of this genus are found in Europe and North America.

Species:

- Negastrius arenicola (Boheman, 1854)
- Negastrius atrosus Wells, 1996
- Negastrius delumbis (Horn)
