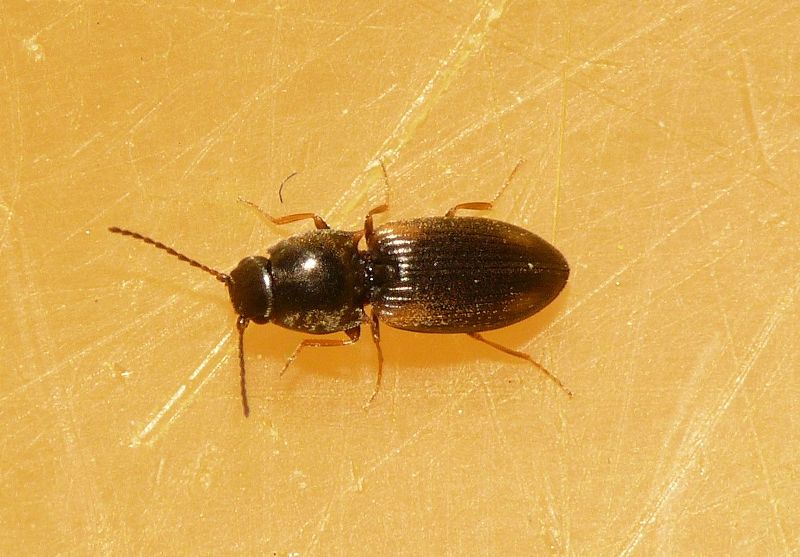
- Oedostethus quadripustulatus

Scientific classification
- Kingdom: Animalia
- Phylum: Arthropoda
- Class: Insecta
- Order: Coleoptera
- Suborder: Polyphaga
- Infraorder: Elateriformia
- Family: Elateridae
- Genus: Oedostethus; LeConte, 1853

= Oedostethus =

Genus of beetles

Oedostethus is a genus of beetles belonging to the family Elateridae.

The species of this genus are found in Europe, Japan and Northern America.

Species:

- Oedostethus cryptohypnoidus (Miwa, 1930)
