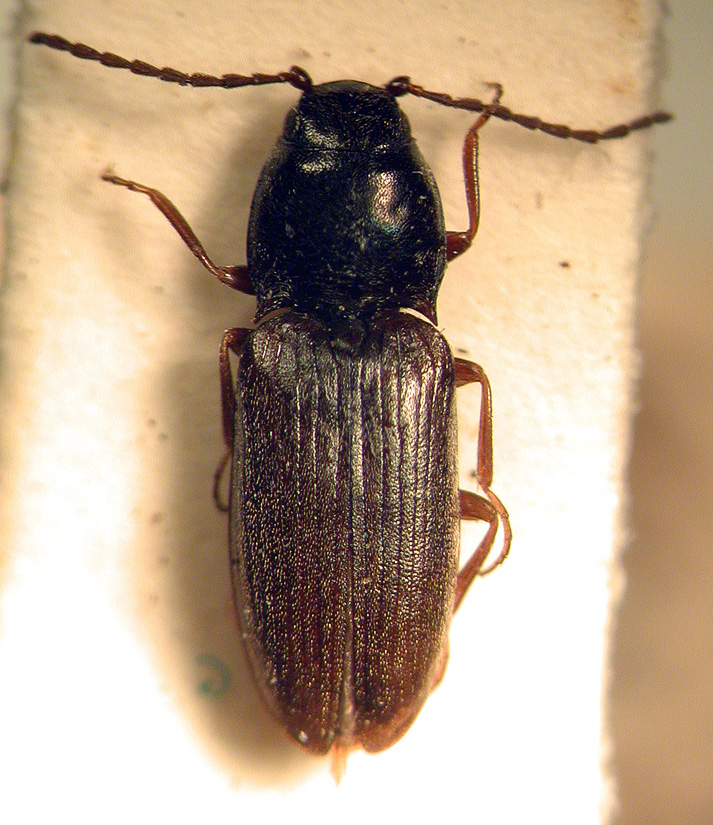
- Fleutiauxellus algidus

Scientific classification
- Kingdom: Animalia
- Phylum: Arthropoda
- Class: Insecta
- Order: Coleoptera
- Suborder: Polyphaga
- Infraorder: Elateriformia
- Family: Elateridae
- Genus: Fleutiauxellus; Méquignon, 1930

= Fleutiauxellus =

Genus of beetles

Fleutiauxellus is a genus of beetles belonging to the family Elateridae.

The species of this genus are found in Europe, Japan and Northern America.

Species:

- Fleutiauxellus algidus (Sahlberg, 1883)
