= List of click beetle genera of India =

This is a list of the genera of click beetles of India (excluding Lakshadweep):

- Abelater Schimmel
- Adelocera Latreille
- Adiaphorus Candeze
- Adrastus Eschscholtz
- Aeolus
- Aeoloderma Fleutiaux
- Agonischius Candeze
- Agriotes
- Agrypnus Eschscholtz
- Alaus
- Ampedus Germar
- Anchastus LeConte
- Aphanobius Eschscholtz
- Athous
- Campsosternus Latreille
- Cardiophorus Eschscholtz
- Cardiorhinus Eschscholtz
- Chalcolepis Candeze
- Conoderus Eschscholtz
- Crepidomenus Erichson
- Ctenicera Latreille
- Denticollis
- Dima
- Drasterius
- Elater Linnaeus
- Glyphonyx Candeze
- Glyphochilus Candeze
- Hemicrepidius
- Hemiops Castelnau
- Heteroderes Latreille
- Horistonotus Candeze
- Hypnoidus Dillwyn
- Lacon Castelnau
- Lanelater Arnette
- Megapenthes Kiesenwetter
- Melanotus Eschscholtz
- Melanoxanthus Eschscholtz
- Meristhus Candeze
- Monadicus Candeze
- Negastrius Nakane & Kishii
- Neoathousius
- Octocryptus Candeze
- Orientis Vats
- Paracardiophorus Candeze
- Pectocera Hope
- Plectrosternus Lacordaire
- Pleurathous
- Procraerus Reitter
- Rismethus Fleutiaux
- Selatosomus
- Senodonia Castelnau
- Sericus
- Sericosomus Stephens
- Silesis Candeze
- Tetrigus Candeze
- Tetralobus Lepel. & Serv.
- Xanthopenthes Schimmel
- Zorochros
