= Giant click beetle =

Giant click beetle can refer to several large members of the family Elateridae, including:

- Oxynopterus

- Oxynopterus mucronatus

- Tetralobus

- Tetralobus flabellicornis
