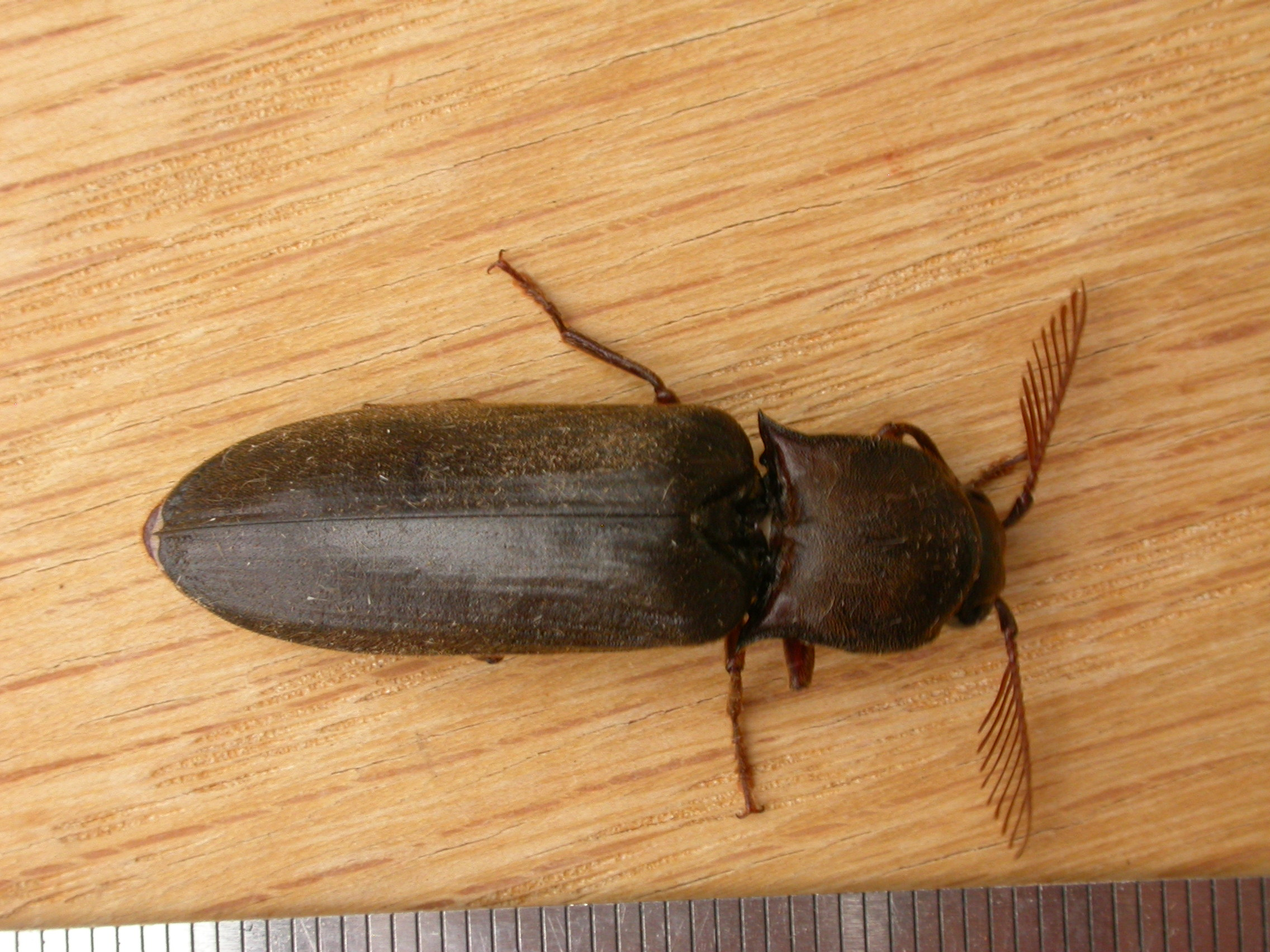
- Pseudotetralobus australasiae

Scientific classification
- Kingdom: Animalia
- Phylum: Arthropoda
- Clade: Pancrustacea
- Class: Insecta
- Order: Coleoptera
- Suborder: Polyphaga
- Infraorder: Elateriformia
- Family: Elateridae
- Subfamily: Tetralobinae; Laporte, 1840

= Tetralobinae =

Subfamily of click beetles

Tetralobinae is a subfamily of click beetles in the family Elateridae. There are about 7 genera and more than 20 described species in Tetralobinae.

== Genera ==
These seven genera belong to the subfamily Tetralobinae:

- Neotetralobus Girard, 1987
- Paratetralobus Laurent, 1964
- Piezophyllus Hope, 1842
- Pseudalaus Laurent, 1967
- Pseudotetralobus Schwarz, 1902
- Sinelater Laurent, 1967
- Tetralobus Lepeletier & Audinet-Serville, 1828
