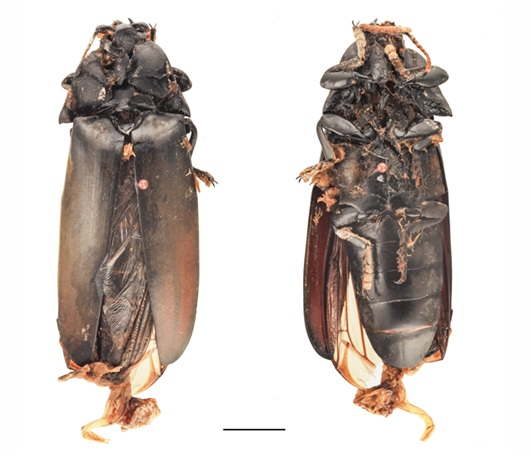

Scientific classification
- Kingdom: Animalia
- Phylum: Arthropoda
- Class: Insecta
- Order: Coleoptera
- Suborder: Polyphaga
- Infraorder: Elateriformia
- Family: Elateridae
- Genus: Sinelater
- Species: S. perroti

Binomial name
- Sinelater perroti (Fleutiaux, 1940)

Synonyms
- Tetralobus perroti Fleutiaux, 1940

= Sinelater =

Genus of beetles

Sinelater is a genus of click beetle belonging to the family Elateridae. Sinelater perroti, its only species, is found in Laos, Myanmar, Vietnam, China (Tibet, Yunnan, Sichuan). Adults reach a length of 43–60 mm, making it of the largest click beetles.

== Taxonomy ==
The species was originally described as a Tetralobus species. It was later moved to the subgenus Sinelater. This subgenus was upgraded to the genus level in 1994.
