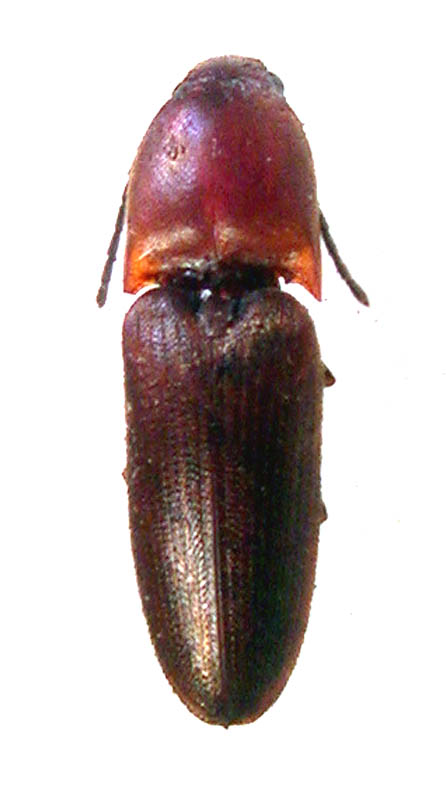

Scientific classification
- Domain: Eukaryota
- Kingdom: Animalia
- Phylum: Arthropoda
- Class: Insecta
- Order: Coleoptera
- Suborder: Polyphaga
- Infraorder: Elateriformia
- Family: Elateridae
- Genus: Abelater; Fleutiaux, 1947

Species
- At least 32, see text

= Abelater =

Abelater Temporal range: Paleogene–present, 37.2–0 Ma

Genus of beetles

Abelater is a genus of click beetles, family Elateridae.

== Species ==
There are at least extant 32 species:

- Abelater babanus Kishii, 1989
- Abelater bivittatus (Candèze, 1878)
- Abelater bousaianus Kishii, 1991
- Abelater brancuccii Schimmel, 2004
- Abelater cinctus (Fleutiaux, 1916)
- Abelater cruciellus (Candèze, 1894)
- Abelater davaoensis Ôhira, 1973
- Abelater gratus (Fauvel, 1904)
- Abelater haucki Schimmel, 2006
- Abelater himalayanus Schimmel, 2004
- Abelater infimus (Candèze, 1875)
- Abelater iriomotensis Kishii, 1985
- Abelater maculatus (Fleutiaux, 1918)
- Abelater makiharai Ôhira, 1970
- Abelater mindanaoensis Ôhira, 1973
- Abelater miyatakei Ôhira, 1973
- Abelater morio (Candèze, 1878)
- Abelater nigritulus (Candèze, 1882)
- Abelater nigrolineatus Kishii, 1991
- Abelater philippinensis (Fleutiaux, 1916)
- Abelater picturatus (Fauvel, 1904)
- Abelater pulcherus (Miwa, 1933)
- Abelater rixosus (Candèze, 1897)
- Abelater rubiginosus (Candèze, 1878)
- Abelater rufus Fleutiaux, 1947
- Abelater satoi (Ôhira, 1968)
- Abelater sexpustulatus (Schwarz, 1902)
- Abelater shirozui (Kishii, 1959)
- Abelater sinensis Schimmel, 2004
- Abelater singularis (Candèze, 1897)
- Abelater taiwanus Kishii, 1989
- Abelater trivittatus (Schwarz, 1901)

There is also one prehistoric species known from Baltic amber:

- †Abelater succineus Schimmel, 2005

== See also ==
- List of click beetles of India
