= Melanoxanthus yushiroi =

Scientific classification
- Domain: Eukaryota
- Kingdom: Animalia
- Phylum: Arthropoda
- Class: Insecta
- Order: Coleoptera
- Suborder: Polyphaga
- Infraorder: Elateriformia
- Family: Elateridae
- Genus: Melanoxanthus
- Species: M. yushiroi

Binomial name
- Melanoxanthus yushiroi W. Suzuki, 1999

Species of beetle

Melanoxanthus yushiroi is a species of beetle from the Elateridae family. The scientific name of this species was first published in 1999 by W. Suzuki.
