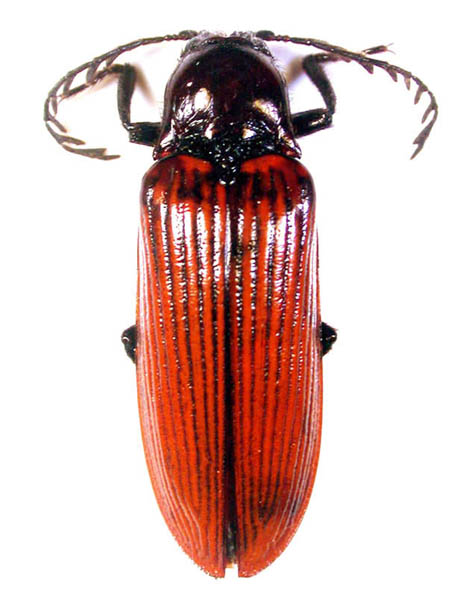
- A new species of Plectrosternus

Scientific classification
- Domain: Eukaryota
- Kingdom: Animalia
- Phylum: Arthropoda
- Class: Insecta
- Order: Coleoptera
- Suborder: Polyphaga
- Infraorder: Elateriformia
- Family: Elateridae
- Subfamily: Dendrometrinae
- Genus: Plectrosternus; Lacordaire, 1857

Species
- Many

= Plectrosternus =

Genus of beetles

Plectrosternus is a genus of moderate to large sized click beetles.

== Gallery ==
Plectrosternus rufus: Collected from Sidapur on 5 vii 1917. This is photograph of a specimen deposited in Pusa, New Delhi.

== See also ==
- List of click beetles of India
