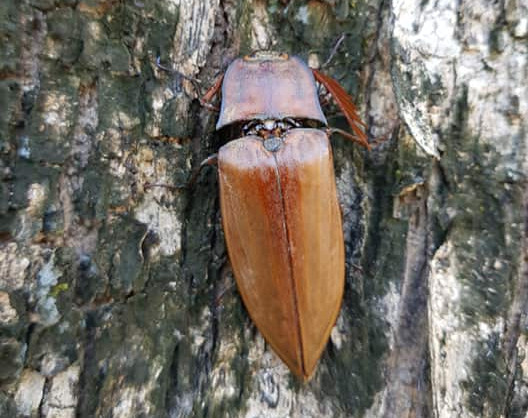
- Male O. mucronatus from Mindanao, Philippines

Scientific classification
- Kingdom: Animalia
- Phylum: Arthropoda
- Clade: Pancrustacea
- Class: Insecta
- Order: Coleoptera
- Suborder: Polyphaga
- Infraorder: Elateriformia
- Family: Elateridae
- Genus: Oxynopterus
- Species: O. mucronatus

Binomial name
- Oxynopterus mucronatus (Olivier, 1792)

Synonyms
- Elater mucronatus Olivier, 1792

= Oxynopterus mucronatus =

Species of beetle

Oxynopterus mucronatus, sometimes known as the giant click beetle, is a species of click beetle from tropical Southeast Asia. Their larvae are specialized predators of termites.

== Taxonomy ==
Oxynopterus mucronatus was originally described by the French entomologist Guillaume-Antoine Olivier in 1792 as Elater mucronatus. The type specimen was obtained from the collection of William V, Prince of Orange. It became the type species of the genus Oxynopterus, established by the English naturalist Frederick William Hope in 1842. O. mucronatus is classified under the tribe Oxynopterini, in the click beetle family Elateridae.

The generic name Oxynopterus means "sharp-wing" in ancient Greek; while the specific name mucronatus is Latin for "pointed". Both refer to the sharp, pointed tips of the elytra.

== Description ==
Oxynopterus mucronatus, like other members of the genus Oxynopterus, are among the largest of the click beetles. The males have distinctive feather-like antennae, with long flat lamellae extending from the antenna segments. The females in contrast, have thin toothed antennae and are larger than the males. The prothorax is shield-shaped, with sharply pointed posteriolateral tips. The elytra are long and smooth, tapering to a sharp point. The claws are simple, without bristles (setae), pads, or lobes on the tarsal segments. They are predominantly reddish-brown in life.

== Ecology ==
The larvae of O. mucronatus are specialized predators of termites of the genus Neotermes.

== Uses ==
Dried O. mucronatus is regarded as a traditional aphrodisiac in Javanese culture. They are also popular among insect collectors due to their large sizes.

== See also ==
- Campsosternus
- Tetralobus flabellicornis
