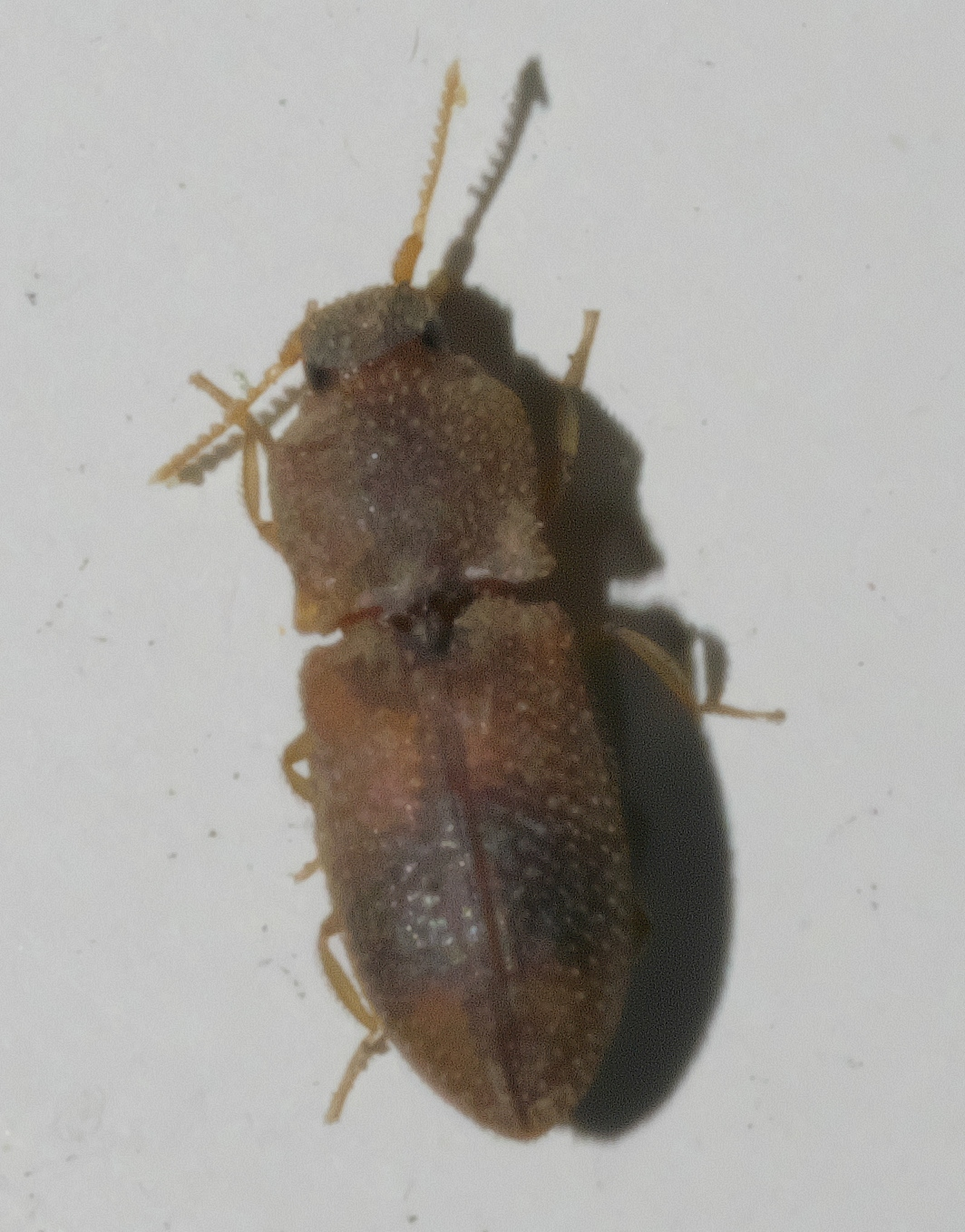
- Rismethus scobinula, Oklahoma

Scientific classification
- Kingdom: Animalia
- Phylum: Arthropoda
- Class: Insecta
- Order: Coleoptera
- Suborder: Polyphaga
- Infraorder: Elateriformia
- Family: Elateridae
- Subfamily: Agrypninae
- Tribe: Agrypnini
- Genus: Rismethus
- Species: R. scobinula

Binomial name
- Rismethus scobinula (Candèze, 1857)

= Rismethus scobinula =

Species of beetles

Rismethus scobinula is a species of click beetle in the family Elateridae. It is found in the south-central United States and northern Mexico.
