= Melanoxanthus festivus =

Scientific classification
- Domain: Eukaryota
- Kingdom: Animalia
- Phylum: Arthropoda
- Class: Insecta
- Order: Coleoptera
- Suborder: Polyphaga
- Infraorder: Elateriformia
- Family: Elateridae
- Genus: Melanoxanthus
- Species: M. festivus

Binomial name
- Melanoxanthus festivus Van Zwaluwenburg, 1957

Species of beetle

Melanoxanthus anticus is a species of click beetle belonging to the family Elateridae.
