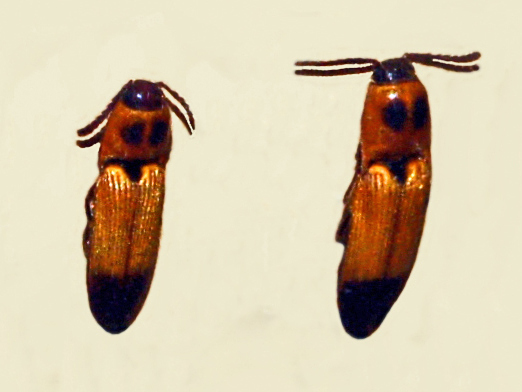
- Melanoxanthus senegalensis from Guinea-Bissau. Mounted specimen

Scientific classification
- Domain: Eukaryota
- Kingdom: Animalia
- Phylum: Arthropoda
- Class: Insecta
- Order: Coleoptera
- Suborder: Polyphaga
- Infraorder: Elateriformia
- Family: Elateridae
- Genus: Melanoxanthus
- Species: M. senegalensis

Binomial name
- Melanoxanthus senegalensis (Candeze, 1893)

= Melanoxanthus senegalensis =

Species of beetle

Melanoxanthus senegalensis is a species of click beetle belonging to the family Elateridae. This species can be found in Senegal and Guinea-Bissau.
