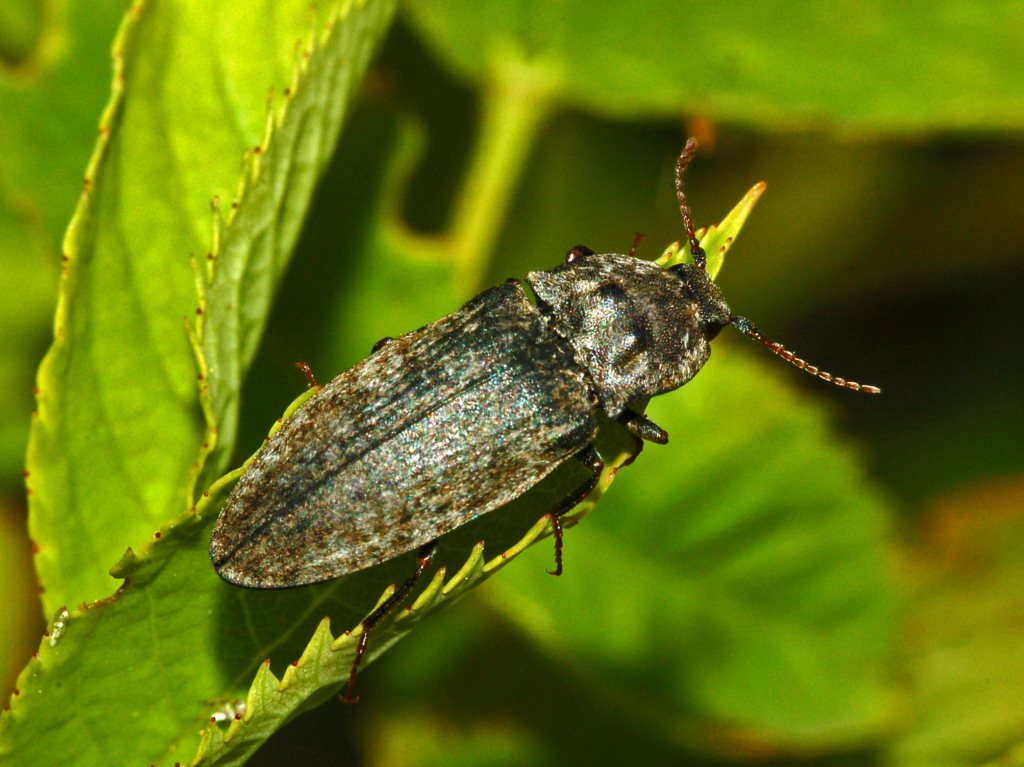

Scientific classification
- Kingdom: Animalia
- Phylum: Arthropoda
- Class: Insecta
- Order: Coleoptera
- Suborder: Polyphaga
- Infraorder: Elateriformia
- Family: Elateridae
- Subfamily: Agrypninae
- Genus: Agrypnus
- Species: A. murinus

Binomial name
- Agrypnus murinus (Linnaeus, 1758)

Synonyms
- Adelocera murina (Linnaeus, 1758); Elater kokeilli Küster, 1845; Elater murinus Linnaeus, 1758; Lacon murinus (Linnaeus, 1758)

= Agrypnus murinus =

Mottled Dingy-brown Click Beetle

Species of beetle

Agrypnus murinus, known as the mottled dingy-brown click beetle, is a species of click beetle belonging to the family Elateridae subfamily Agrypninae.

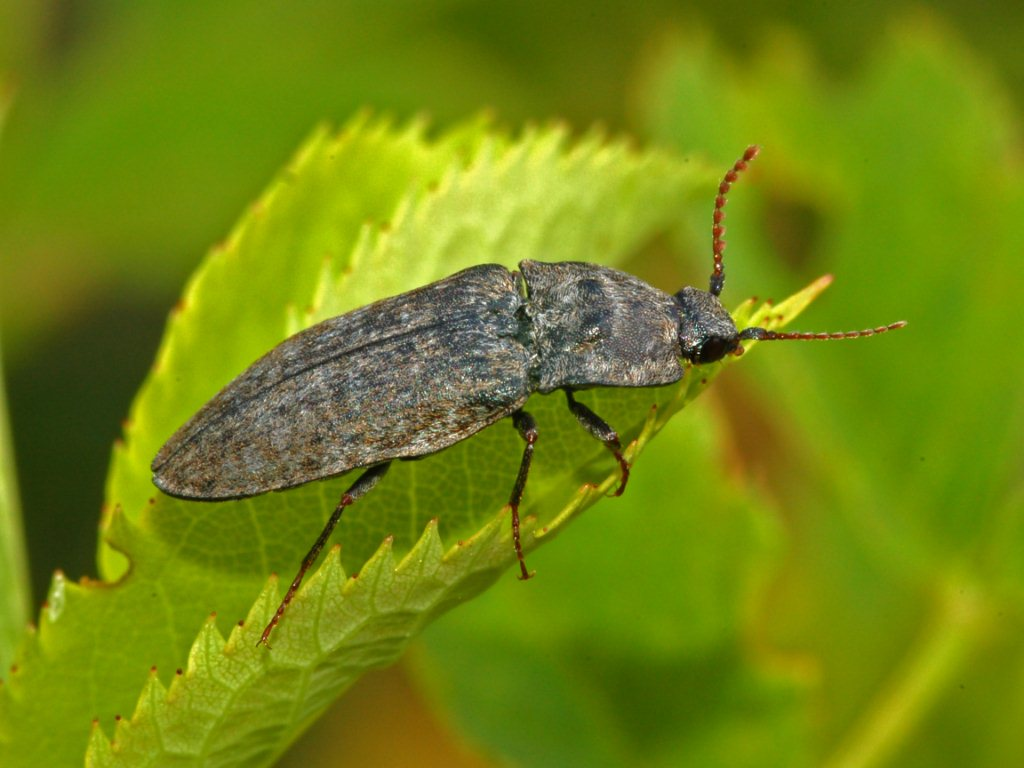
Lateral view

This beetle is present in most of Europe, the eastern Palearctic realm, the Near East and the Nearctic realm.

Agrypnus murinus in a meadow

The dark-brown larvae of this beetle develop in the soil, eating roots, worms and larvae of other insects.

The adults grow up to 10–17 millimetres (0.39–0.67 in) long and is mostly encountered from late April through June in open or mountain areas, low forests or grassland habitats, being sometimes dangerous for crops.

The whole body is grey-brown with greyish points and is covered with a thick pubescence, while legs and antennae are mainly reddish or dark-brown.
