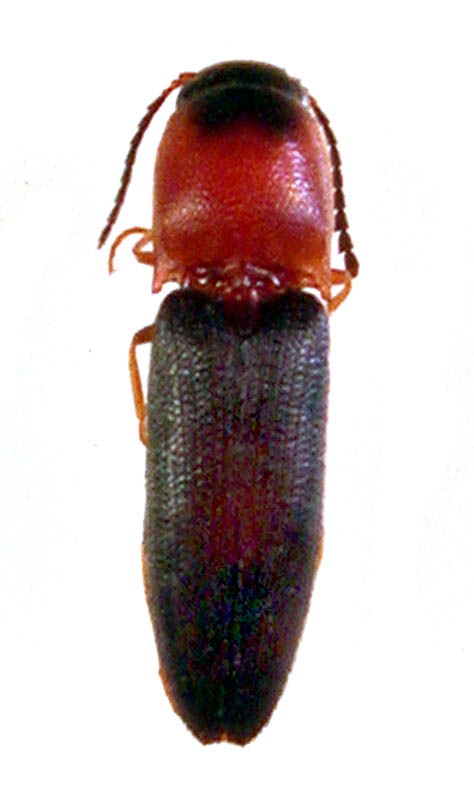
- Mounted specimen

Scientific classification
- Domain: Eukaryota
- Kingdom: Animalia
- Phylum: Arthropoda
- Class: Insecta
- Order: Coleoptera
- Suborder: Polyphaga
- Infraorder: Elateriformia
- Family: Elateridae
- Genus: Melanoxanthus
- Species: M. anticus

Binomial name
- Melanoxanthus anticus Candèze, 1892

= Melanoxanthus anticus =

Species of beetle

Melanoxanthus anticus is a species of click beetle belonging to the family Elateridae.

This species seems to have wide distribution in Maharashtra (India). Two specimens were collected by Amol Patwardhan at places approximately 600 kilometres (370 mi) apart.
