= Agrypnus uidoensis =

Scientific classification
- Kingdom: Animalia
- Phylum: Arthropoda
- Clade: Pancrustacea
- Class: Insecta
- Order: Coleoptera
- Suborder: Polyphaga
- Infraorder: Elateriformia
- Family: Elateridae
- Genus: Agrypnus
- Species: A. uidoensis

Binomial name
- Agrypnus uidoensis Han & Park, 2009

Species of beetle

Agrypnus uidoensis is a species of click beetle (Elateridae).

This beetle was first described in 2009 by Tae Man Han and others.

It is endemic to the Korean peninsula, where it is found on the island of Uido. The species epithet, uidoensis, describes it as coming from Uido, which is where the holotype specimens were collected alive (on the sanddunes of Dunmok Beach).
