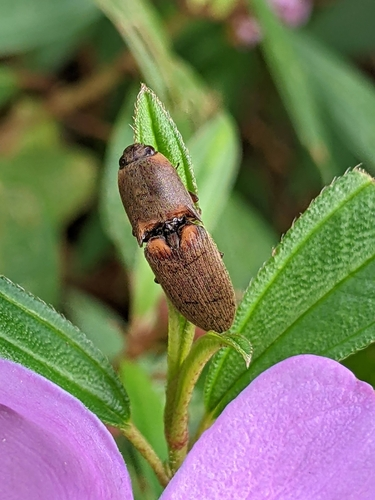
- Unknown species of Xanthopenthes found in Upper Seletar Reservoir in Singapore

Scientific classification
- Kingdom: Animalia
- Phylum: Arthropoda
- Class: Insecta
- Order: Coleoptera
- Suborder: Polyphaga
- Infraorder: Elateriformia
- Family: Elateridae
- Genus: Xanthopenthes; Fleutiaux, 1929

Type species
- Megapenthes birmanicus Candèze, 1888

Synonyms
- Xanthelater Miwa, 1931; Xantherater Miwa, 1934

= Xanthopenthes =

Genus of beetles

Xanthopenthes is a genus of beetles in the family Elateridae. It was first described by Edmond Jean-Baptiste Fleutiaux in 1928. Members of Xanthopenthes can be found in the Oriental Region which includes parts of Southeast Asia and China. Several species in this genus have been described in recent years, highlighting its ongoing taxonomic interest and regional biodiversity significance.

== Species ==
According to Wikispecies, there are 118 species of Xanthopenthes. Species with existing records include:

- Xanthopenthes candezei (Schimmel, 1999)
- Xanthopenthes dolini (Schimmel, 1999)
- Xanthopenthes krali (Schimmel, 1999)
- Xanthopenthes apicatus (Schimmel, 1999)
- Xanthopenthes tamilensis (Platia & Pulvirenti, 2023)
- Xanthopenthes cambodianus (Platia & Pulvirenti, 2023)
- Xanthopenthes constanti (Platia & Pulvirenti, 2023)
- Xanthopenthes nigerrimus (Platia & Pulvirenti, 2023)

== Distribution ==
Species of Xanthopenthes have been documented in South and Southeast Asia, including Malaysia, Indonesia, Thailand, Cambodia, and India.

== Description ==
Species such as Xanthopenthes manettii, Xanthopenthes tamilensis, and Xanthopenthes viklundi are moderately shiny and covered in dense, yellow-fulvous pubescence.

- Xanthopenthes manettii is entirely yellow-brown
- Xanthopenthes tamilensis is brownish
- Xanthopenthes viklundi has a blackish head with yellow-ferruginous legs and antennae

They typically range from 8.0 to 15 mm in length and 1.68 to 3.43 mm in width, with bilaterally symmetric bodies.

== Habitat ==
There is limited information available on the specific habitat of Xanthopenthes species. However, available observations indicate that these beetles are predominantly terrestrial. Observational records from GBIF and iNaturalist indicate that Xanthopenthes species are typically found on tree branches, within leaf litter, or at the base of trees.

For instance, Xanthopenthes apicactus was recorded in Kirirom National Park and Phnom Kulen National Park in Cambodia. These parks are known for their forested areas and waterfalls.
