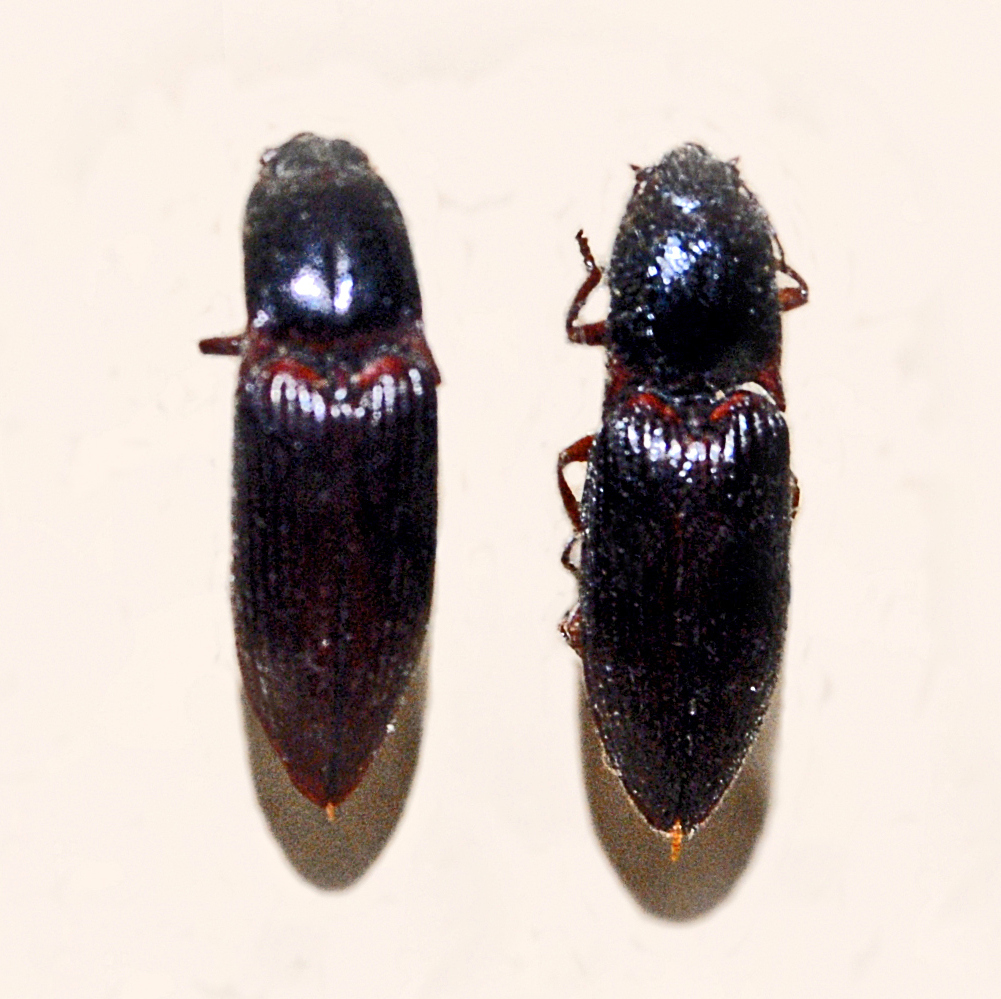
- Crepidomenus australis

Scientific classification
- Kingdom: Animalia
- Phylum: Arthropoda
- Class: Insecta
- Order: Coleoptera
- Suborder: Polyphaga
- Infraorder: Elateriformia
- Family: Elateridae
- Genus: Crepidomenus
- Species: C. australis

Binomial name
- Crepidomenus australis (Boisduval, 1835)

= Crepidomenus australis =

Species of beetle

Crepidomenus australis is a species of beetles in the click beetle family.

== Description ==
Crepidomenus australis can reach a length of about 9 millimetres (0.35 in). Body is black, with reddish legs.

== Distribution ==
This species can be found in the Australian Capital Territory, New South Wales (SE coastal) and Victoria.
