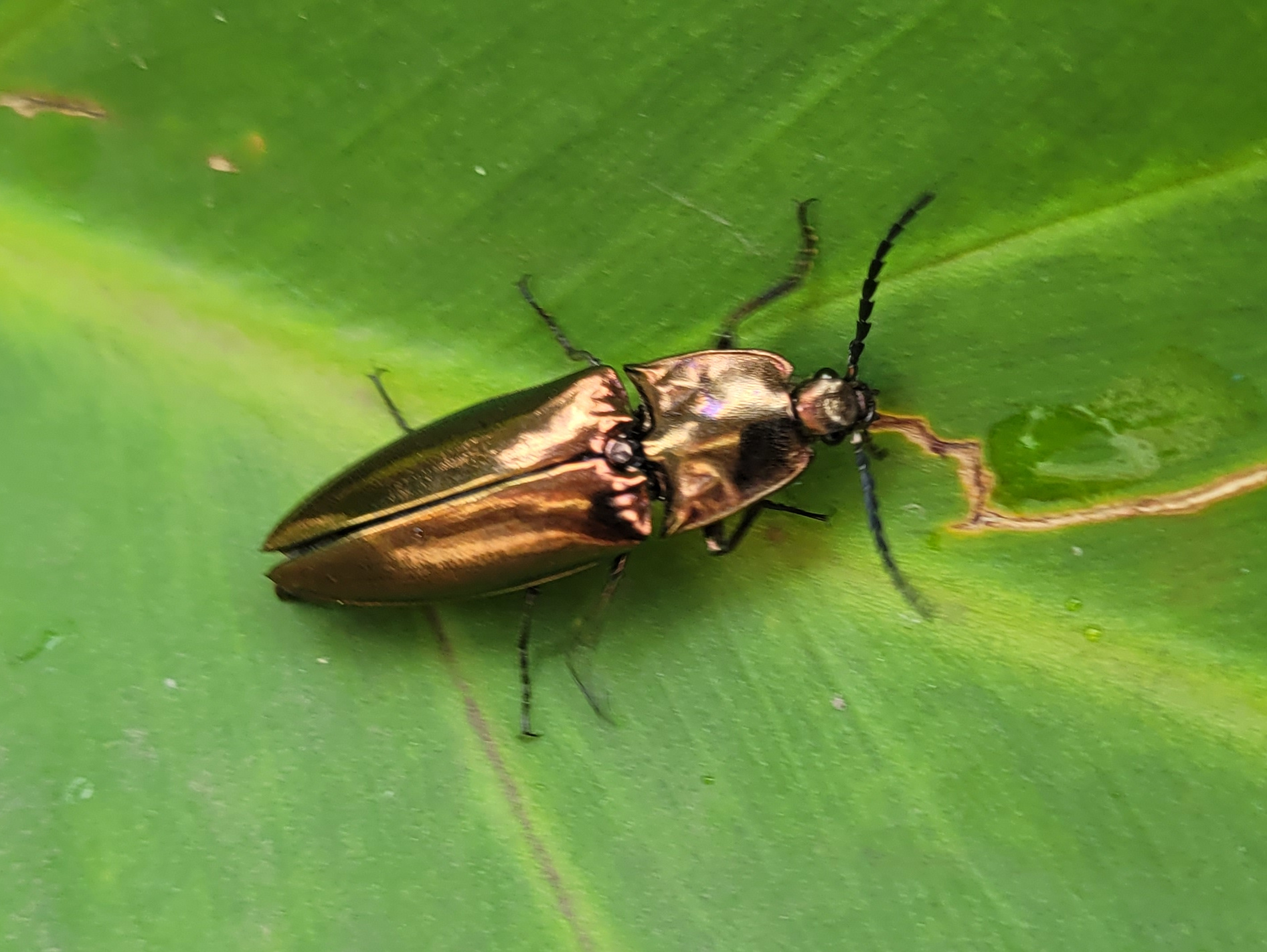
- Gold morph of Campsosternus rutilans in Bukidnon, Philippines

Scientific classification
- Kingdom: Animalia
- Phylum: Arthropoda
- Clade: Pancrustacea
- Class: Insecta
- Order: Coleoptera
- Suborder: Polyphaga
- Infraorder: Elateriformia
- Family: Elateridae
- Genus: Campsosternus
- Species: C. rutilans

Binomial name
- Campsosternus rutilans Chevrolat, 1841

= Campsosternus rutilans =

Species of beetles

Campsosternus rutilans is a species of click beetle that belongs to the family Elateridae. It is endemic to the Philippines.

== Taxonomy ==
Campsosternus rutilans was first described by the French entomologist Louis Alexandre Auguste Chevrolat in 1841 from a specimen collected from Manila.

=== Etymology ===
The specific name rutilans is Latin for "glowing or glittering with a reddish-golden light."

== Description ==
It is a large beetle, with a length of 33 mm (1.3 in), and a width of 12 mm (0.47 in).

This species has iridescent metallic coloration. It is polymorphic and can vary greatly in coloration, ranging from a metallic green, to dark bronze, to a bright coppery-gold. Its thorax is slightly sinuous in outline with a prominent rim. The upper surface of the thorax is obliquely depressed on the posterior corners. The tiny scutellum is transversely rounded and elevated. The posterior ends of the elytra end in sharp but obtuse tips.
