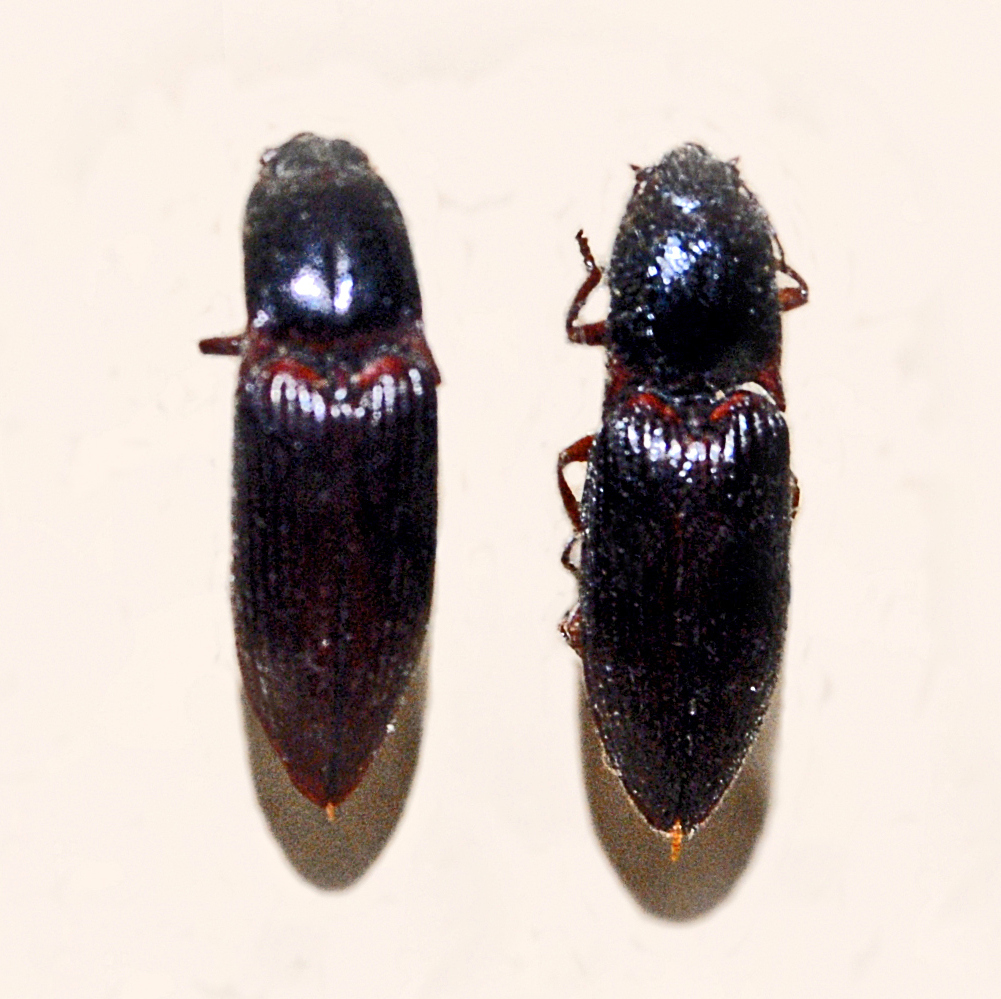
- Crepidomenus australis

Scientific classification
- Kingdom: Animalia
- Phylum: Arthropoda
- Class: Insecta
- Order: Coleoptera
- Suborder: Polyphaga
- Infraorder: Elateriformia
- Family: Elateridae
- Subfamily: Dendrometrinae
- Genus: Crepidomenus; Erichson, 1842

= Crepidomenus =

Genus of beetles

Crepidomenus is a genus of beetles in the click beetle family.

== Species ==
- Crepidomenus adamsi Calder, 1986
- Crepidomenus aenescens Schwarz, 1907
- Crepidomenus aeneus Candèze, 1878
- Crepidomenus alpestris Calder, 1986
- Crepidomenus aurora Calder, 1986
- Crepidomenus australis (Boisduval, 1835)
- Crepidomenus bodalla Calder, 1986
- Crepidomenus booralus Calder, 1986
- Crepidomenus carri Calder, 1986
- Crepidomenus cervus Carter, 1939
- Crepidomenus coonabriensis Calder, 1986
- Crepidomenus cordifer Candèze, 1878
- Crepidomenus cyanescens Candèze, 1897
- Crepidomenus decoratus Erichson, 1842
- Crepidomenus dooliba Calder, 1986
- Crepidomenus dusha Calder, 1986
- Crepidomenus dysmikos Calder, 1986
- Crepidomenus frazieri Calder, 1986
- Crepidomenus fulgidus Erichson, 1842
- Crepidomenus fuscogalbus Calder, 1986
- Crepidomenus georgei Candèze, 1878
- Crepidomenus gidju Calder, 1986
- Crepidomenus gurburra Calder, 1986
- Crepidomenus habrotatos Calder, 1986
- Crepidomenus illinitus Schwarz, 1902
- Crepidomenus kateewailwo Calder, 1986
- Crepidomenus kohouti Calder, 1986
- Crepidomenus kokereka Calder, 1986
- Crepidomenus konkinyeri Calder, 1986
- Crepidomenus kurrajongensis Calder, 1986
- Crepidomenus lansbergei Candèze, 1889
- Crepidomenus luteipes Boheman, 1858
- Crepidomenus marginatus Schwarz, 1907
- Crepidomenus meannjini Calder, 1986
- Crepidomenus memnonius Calder, 1986
- Crepidomenus metallescens Candèze, 1863
- Crepidomenus montanus Carter, 1939
- Crepidomenus neboissi Calder, 1986
- Crepidomenus occidualis Calder, 1986
- Crepidomenus ovalis Candèze, 1887
- Crepidomenus patulus Calder, 1986
- Crepidomenus piceus Calder, 1986
- Crepidomenus prolinwittha Calder, 1986
- Crepidomenus psephenos Calder, 1986
- Crepidomenus purkabidnis Calder, 1986
- Crepidomenus quadraticollis Schwarz, 1903
- Crepidomenus seniculus Candèze;ze, 1863
- Crepidomenus subopacus Candèze, 1878
- Crepidomenus taeniatus Erichson, 1842
- Crepidomenus tamellescens Calder, 1986
- Crepidomenus tandarnya Calder, 1986
- Crepidomenus tokorauwe Calder, 1986
- Crepidomenus trawalla Calder, 1986
- Crepidomenus tuckurimbah Calder, 1986
- Crepidomenus tyrilly Calder, 1986
- Crepidomenus victoriae Candèze, 1863
- Crepidomenus vitticollis Schwarz, 1902
- Crepidomenus vulneratus Candèze, 1897
- Crepidomenus warkolala Calder, 1986
- Crepidomenus wollumbina Calder, 1986
- Crepidomenus yuggus Calder, 1986
