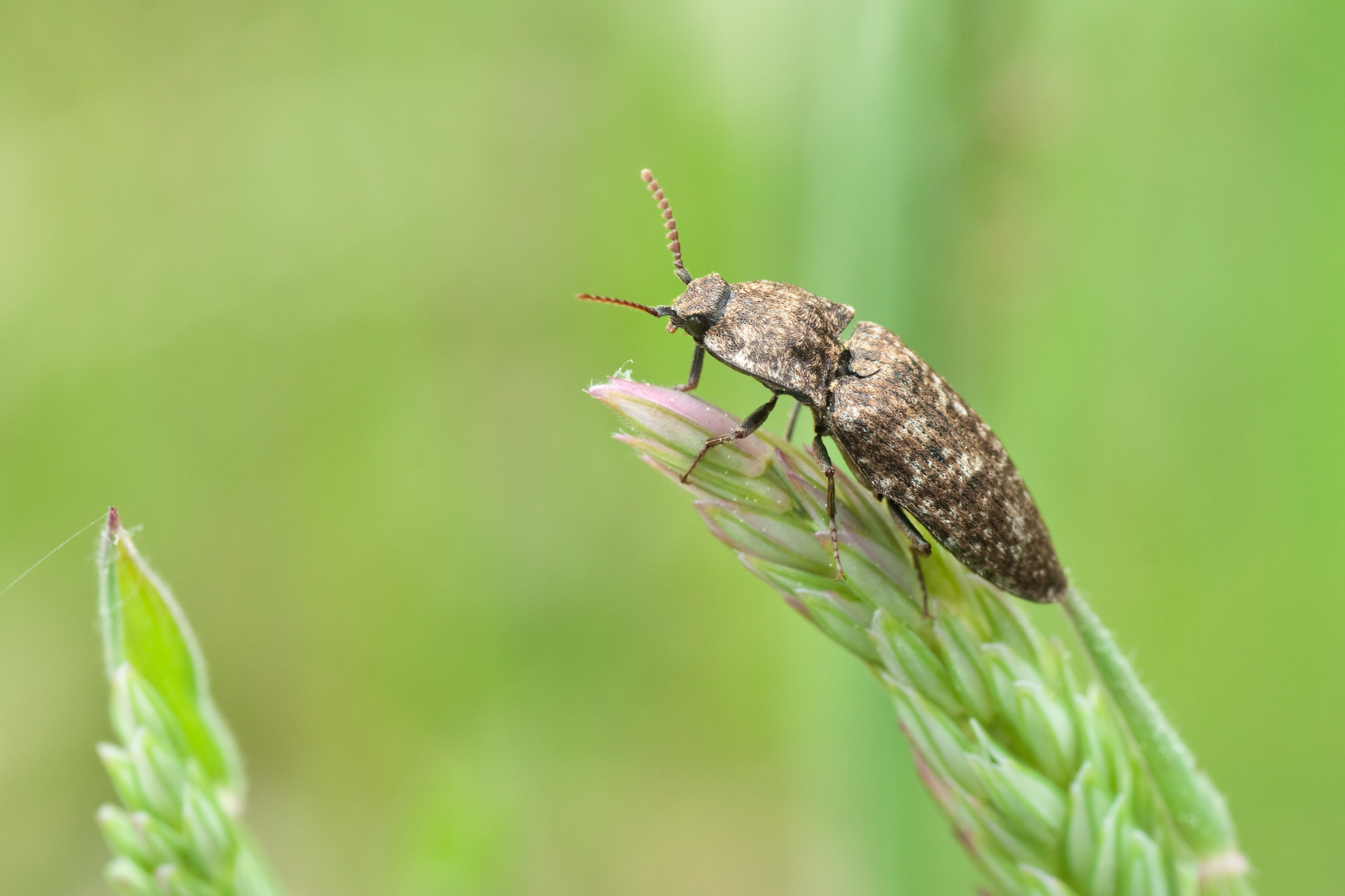
- Agrypnus murinus

Scientific classification
- Kingdom: Animalia
- Phylum: Arthropoda
- Class: Insecta
- Order: Coleoptera
- Suborder: Polyphaga
- Infraorder: Elateriformia
- Family: Elateridae
- Subfamily: Agrypninae
- Tribe: Agrypnini
- Genus: Agrypnus; Eschscholtz, 1829

Species
- Many

= Agrypnus =

Genus of beetles

Agrypnus is a genus of click beetle.

== List of species ==
- Agrypnus aberdarensis (Fleutiaux, 1935)
- Agrypnus abstrusus Hayek, 1973
- Agrypnus abstrusus (Hayek, 1973)
- Agrypnus acervatus (Candèze, 1888)
- Agrypnus acristatus Vats & Kashyap, 1992
- Agrypnus aculeatus (Candèze, 1857)
- Agrypnus acuminipennis (Fairmaire, 1878)
- Agrypnus acutangulus (Fleutiaux, 1936)
- Agrypnus adelaidae (Blackburn, 1892)
- Agrypnus adeloceroides (Candèze, 1900)
- Agrypnus adustus (Elston, 1924)
- Agrypnus aequalis (Candèze, 1900)
- Agrypnus afflictus (Candèze, 1874)
- Agrypnus agrestis Vats & Kashyap, 1992
- Agrypnus akidiformis (Candèze, 1857)
- Agrypnus alberti Hayek, 1973
- Agrypnus albisparsus (Candèze, 1857)
- Agrypnus albitactus (Candèze, 1874)
- Agrypnus alboguttatus (W.J. Macleay, 1888)
- Agrypnus albopictus (Candèze, 1857)
- Agrypnus alboscutatus (Candèze, 1893)
- Agrypnus alboseminatus Kolbe
- Agrypnus alluaudi (Fleutiaux, 1934)
- Agrypnus alternans (W.J. Macleay, 1872)
- Agrypnus alternatus (Schwarz, 1902)
- Agrypnus amamianus (Kishii, 1974)
- Agrypnus amamiensis (Miwa, 1934)
- Agrypnus ami Kishii, 1995
- Agrypnus amplicollis (Boheman, 1851)
- Agrypnus anathesinus (Candèze, 1897)
- Agrypnus andersoni (Blackburn, 1892)
- Agrypnus angularis (Schwarz, 1903)
- Agrypnus angulicollis (Candèze, 1891)
- Agrypnus angustus (Fleutiaux, 1942)
- Agrypnus anili Punam, Saini & Vasu, 1997
- Agrypnus antiguus (Candèze, 1857)
- Agrypnus apiatus Hayek, 1979
- Agrypnus apodixus (Candèze, 1865)
- Agrypnus applanatus (Elston, 1924)
- Agrypnus aquilus (Elston, 1927)
- Agrypnus arbitrarius (Elston, 1924)
- Agrypnus arctior (Candèze, 1895)
- Agrypnus argentatus (Candèze, 1893)
- Agrypnus argentosquamus Vats & Kashyap, 1992
- Agrypnus argillaceus (Solsky, 1871)
- Agrypnus aristatus (Champion, 1894)
- Agrypnus armatus (Candèze, 1889)
- Agrypnus arorai Vats & Kashyap, 1992
- Agrypnus asper (Candèze, 1874)
- Agrypnus asperulatus (Candèze, 1878)
- Agrypnus assus (Candèze, 1857)
- Agrypnus aterrimus Girard, 1986
- Agrypnus atricolor (W.J. Macleay, 1888)
- Agrypnus babanus (Kishii, 1990)
- Agrypnus badeni (Candèze, 1878)
- Agrypnus badius (Elston, 1927)
- Agrypnus baibaranus (Hayek, 1973)
- Agrypnus bakeri (Fleutiaux, 1916)
- Agrypnus basalis (Fleutiaux, 1935)
- Agrypnus beccarii (Candèze, 1880)
- Agrypnus bellator (Elston, 1927)
- Agrypnus bengalensis Punam, Saini & Vasu, 1997
- Agrypnus benitensis (Hayek, 1973)
- Agrypnus bergeali (Girard, 1970)
- Agrypnus bidentatus (Fleutiaux, 1934)
- Agrypnus bidivisus (Candèze, 1874)
- Agrypnus bifasciatus (Schwarz, 1902)
- Agrypnus biforatus (Candèze, 1895)
- Agrypnus bigener (Elston, 1924)
- Agrypnus bigranosus (Schwarz, 1903)
- Agrypnus bilyi Cate, Platia & Schimmel, 2002
- Agrypnus bimaculatus (Schwarz, 1902)
- Agrypnus bimarginatus (Schwarz, 1908)
- Agrypnus binodulus (Motschulsky, 1861)
- Agrypnus binus (Candèze, 1889)
- Agrypnus bipapulatus (Candèze, 1865)
- Agrypnus bipunctatus (Schwarz, 1908)
- Agrypnus blackburni Hayek, 1973
- Agrypnus blairei (Fleutiaux, 1927)
- Agrypnus boomensis Vats & Kashyap, 1992
- Agrypnus borneoensis Ôhira, 1973
- Agrypnus brachychaetus (Kollar, 1844)
- Agrypnus brachypterus Hayek, 1979
- Agrypnus brevipennis (Schwarz, 1903)
- Agrypnus brevis (Candèze, 1857)
- Agrypnus brightensis (Blackburn, 1892)
- Agrypnus brunnipennis (Candèze, 1857)
- Agrypnus bullatus (Carter, 1939)
- Agrypnus buyssoni (Jagemann, 1944)
- Agrypnus caffer (Candèze, 1881)
- Agrypnus calamitosus (Candèze, 1874)
- Agrypnus caliginosus (Boisduval, 1835)
- Agrypnus campestris Vats & Kashyap, 1992
- Agrypnus candezei (Fleutiaux, 1894)
- Agrypnus canescens (Candèze, 1897)
- Agrypnus cariei (Fleutiaux, 1920)
- Agrypnus carinicollis (Schwarz, 1908)
- Agrypnus carinulatus (Candèze, 1857)
- Agrypnus cashmiriensis (Della Beffa, 1931)
- Agrypnus castaneipennis (Candèze, 1956)
- Agrypnus castaneus (Elston, 1927)
- Agrypnus castelnaui (Candèze, 1882)
- Agrypnus catatonus (Hayek, 1979)
- Agrypnus catatonus Hayek, 1979
- Agrypnus cervinus (Erichson, 1834)
- Agrypnus charcus Boheman
- Agrypnus cinctipes (Germar, 1840)
- Agrypnus cineraceus (Elston, 1927)
- Agrypnus cinerascens (Candèze, 1879)
- Agrypnus cinnamoneus (Candèze, 1874)
- Agrypnus cithareus (Candèze, 1893)
- Agrypnus claudinae Dolin & Girard, 2003
- Agrypnus coarctatus (Candèze, 1874)
- Agrypnus coctus (Candèze, 1874)
- Agrypnus coenosus (Hope, 1831)
- Agrypnus cognatus (Van Zwaluwenburg, 1957)
- Agrypnus collisus (Candèze, 1891)
- Agrypnus colonicus (Candèze, 1881)
- Agrypnus coloratus (Fleutiaux, 1934)
- Agrypnus communis (W.J. Macleay, 1888)
- Agrypnus commutabilis (Elston, 1924)
- Agrypnus compactus (Candèze, 1882)
- Agrypnus comptus (Candèze, 1874)
- Agrypnus concoloris Vats & Kashyap, 1992
- Agrypnus confertus Vats & Kashyap, 1992
- Agrypnus consobrinus (Candèze, 1857)
- Agrypnus conspiciendus (Elston, 1924)
- Agrypnus conspurcatus (Candèze, 1895)
- Agrypnus cordicollis (Candèze, 1865)
- Agrypnus cordipennis (Candèze, 1874)
- Agrypnus corvinus (Candèze, 1882)
- Agrypnus costicollis (Candèze, 1857)
- Agrypnus costipennis (Germar, 1848)
- Agrypnus couturieri Girard, 1986
- Agrypnus crassus (Candèze, 1874)
- Agrypnus crenatus (Kluge, 1833)
- Agrypnus crenicollis (Ménétriés, 1832)
- Agrypnus cruentatus (Elston, 1927)
- Agrypnus curtus (LeConte, 1853)
- Agrypnus cuspidatus (Kluge, 1833)
- Agrypnus cylindripennis (Fleutiaux, 1934)
- Agrypnus davidis (Fairmaire, 1878)
- Agrypnus dealbatus (Candèze, 1882)
- Agrypnus deboulayi (Candèze, 1874)
- Agrypnus decoratus (Candèze, 1882)
- Agrypnus decoratus (Schwarz, 1898)
- Agrypnus defectus (Candèze, 1888)
- Agrypnus denticollis (Fleutiaux, 1918)
- Agrypnus depressus (Candèze, 1874)
- Agrypnus desjardinsi (Candèze, 1857)
- Agrypnus deyrollei von Hayek, 1973
- Agrypnus dilaticollis (Fleutiaux, 1934)
- Agrypnus dilatipennis Kishii, 1995
- Agrypnus discedens (Candèze, 1878)
- Agrypnus divaricatus (Candèze, 1865)
- Agrypnus dorcinus (Candèze, 1875)
- Agrypnus dubius Candèze
- Agrypnus duplex (Blackburn, 1892)
- Agrypnus ellipticus (Candèze, 1857)
- Agrypnus elongatus (Carter, 1939)
- Agrypnus elstoni (Neboiss, 1956)
- Agrypnus eucalypti (Blackburn, 1892)
- Agrypnus eximius (Candèze, 1857)
- Agrypnus fairmairei (Candèze, 1889)
- Agrypnus fallax (Fairmaire, 1903)
- Agrypnus farinensis (Blackburn, 1900)
- Agrypnus farinosus (Candèze, 1895)
- Agrypnus fasciolatus (W.J. Macleay, 1888)
- Agrypnus fastigiatus (Schwarz, 1898)
- Agrypnus fatuus (Candèze, 1874)
- Agrypnus fenerivus (Fleutiaux, 1934)
- Agrypnus feralis (Candèze, 1891)
- Agrypnus fergusoni (Elston, 1927)
- Agrypnus ferrugineus (Candèze, 1874)
- Agrypnus ferruginipes (Fleutiaux, 1932)
- Agrypnus fex (Candèze, 1874)
- Agrypnus fibrinus (Candèze, 1865)
- Agrypnus fictus (Candèze, 1868)
- Agrypnus flavipes (Candeze)
- Agrypnus foedus (Candèze, 1857)
- Agrypnus formosanus (Bates, 1866)
- Agrypnus foveicollis (Cobos, 1970)
- Agrypnus frenchi Hayek, 1973
- Agrypnus froggatti (W.J. Macleay, 1888)
- Agrypnus fuliginosus (Candèze, 1865)
- Agrypnus fulvastra (Fleutiaux, 1940)
- Agrypnus fulvisparsus (Candèze, 1874)
- Agrypnus fuscoluridus Vats & Kashyap, 1992
- Agrypnus fuscus (Fabricius, 1801)
- Agrypnus gabonensis Hayek, 1973
- Agrypnus gazagnairei (Candèze, 1889)
- Agrypnus geminatus (Candèze, 1857)
- Agrypnus gibberiphorus Dolin & Girard, 2003
- Agrypnus gibberosus (Candèze, 1889)
- Agrypnus gibbosus (Schwarz, 1903)
- Agrypnus gibbus (Candèze, 1882)
- Agrypnus gilberti Dolin & Girard, 2003
- Agrypnus girardi (Hayek, 1979)
- Agrypnus glirinus (Candèze, 1865)
- Agrypnus goudoti (Candèze, 1857)
- Agrypnus gracilentus (Schwarz, 1902)
- Agrypnus gracilis (Blackburn, 1890)
- Agrypnus gracilis (Candèze, 1874)
- Agrypnus gragetensis (Szombathy, 1909)
- Agrypnus granulatus (W.J. Macleay, 1872)
- Agrypnus gressitti Ôhira, 1972
- Agrypnus griseopilosus (Fleutiaux, 1932)
- Agrypnus grisescens (Candèze, 1874)
- Agrypnus guineensis Girard, 2003
- Agrypnus guttatus (Candèze, 1857)
- Agrypnus gypsatus (Candèze, 1891)
- Agrypnus hackeri (Elston, 1927)
- Agrypnus haedulus (Candèze, 1857)
- Agrypnus hamatus (Candèze, 1893)
- Agrypnus hastatus (Candèze, 1857)
- Agrypnus haterumana (Ôhira, 1967)
- Agrypnus heianus Kishii, 1985
- Agrypnus herczigi Platia & Schimmel, 2007
- Agrypnus herzi (Koenig, 1887)
- Agrypnus hexagonus (Candèze, 1893)
- Agrypnus himalayanus (Jagemann, 1944)
- Agrypnus hispidulus (Candèze, 1857)
- Agrypnus holontelius Vats & Kashyap, 1992
- Agrypnus hottentota (Candèze, 1857)
- Agrypnus hova (Fleutiaux, 1903)
- Agrypnus humilis (Erichson, 1842)
- Agrypnus hydropictus (Fairmaire, 1880)
- Agrypnus hydropicus (Fairmaire, 1880)
- Agrypnus hypnicola (Kishii, 1964)
- Agrypnus illimis (Horn, 1894)
- Agrypnus impectinatus Vats & Kashyap, 1992
- Agrypnus impressicollis (Elston, 1924)
- Agrypnus impressus (Candèze, 1878)
- Agrypnus inaequalis (Fleutiaux, 1934)
- Agrypnus incertus (Fleutiaux, 1927)
- Agrypnus incultus (W.J. Macleay, 1888)
- Agrypnus incurvatus (Fleutiaux, 1927)
- Agrypnus indianus Punam, Saini & Vasu, 1997
- Agrypnus indosinensis (Fleutiaux, 1927)
- Agrypnus inductus (Candèze, 1888)
- Agrypnus industissimus (Candèze, 1892)
- Agrypnus inlustris Vats & Kashyap, 1992
- Agrypnus inops (Candèze, 1874)
- Agrypnus insularis (Candèze, 1874)
- Agrypnus insulsus (Candèze, 1895)
- Agrypnus intermedius (Schwarz, 1902)
- Agrypnus interpunctatus (Kluge, 1833)
- Agrypnus irroratus (Kluge, 1833)
- Agrypnus jacksoni Vats & Kashyap, 1992
- Agrypnus jagemanni Jiang, 1993
- Agrypnus jansoni (Fairmaire, 1871)
- Agrypnus judex (Candèze, 1874)
- Agrypnus jurulosus (Candèze, 1889)
- Agrypnus kawamurae (Miwa, 1929)
- Agrypnus kenyensis (Fleutiaux, 1919)
- Agrypnus kinangopa (Fleutiaux, 1935)
- Agrypnus korotjaevi (Gurjeva, 1987)
- Agrypnus kuluensis Vats & Kashyap, 1992
- Agrypnus kumayuni Punam, Saini & Vasu, 1997
- Agrypnus kusuii Ôhira, 1993
- Agrypnus labiosus (Candèze, 1874)
- Agrypnus lacrymosus (Candèze, 1874)
- Agrypnus lakhoni (Hayek, 1973)
- Agrypnus lameyi (Fleutiaux, 1927)
- Agrypnus lamottei Girard, 1991
- Agrypnus lapideus (Candèze, 1857)
- Agrypnus lateralis (Schwarz, 1903)
- Agrypnus laticollis (Candèze, 1857)
- Agrypnus latissimus Dolin & Girard, 2003
- Agrypnus latiusculus (Candèze, 1878)
- Agrypnus latus (Candèze, 1857)
- Agrypnus lavaudeni (Fleutiaux, 1932)
- Agrypnus laxatus (Candèze, 1895)
- Agrypnus lecordieri (Girard, 1971)
- Agrypnus leprosus (Candèze, 1857)
- Agrypnus leucaspis (Candèze, 1874)
- Agrypnus lezeleuci (Candèze, 1857)
- Agrypnus limonius Girard, 1991
- Agrypnus limosus (Candèze, 1881)
- Agrypnus lindensis (Blackburn, 1892)
- Agrypnus lineatellus (W.J. Macleay, 1888)
- Agrypnus lineatus (Candèze, 1897)
- Agrypnus litigiosus (Candèze, 1874)
- Agrypnus liukueiensis Kishii, 1990
- Agrypnus lolodorfensis Hayek, 1973
- Agrypnus longicollis (Heller, 1914)
- Agrypnus longicornis (Fleutiaux, 1934)
- Agrypnus longipennis (Schwarz, 1899)
- Agrypnus longus (Fleutiaux, 1902)
- Agrypnus lopezi (Fleutiaux, 1934)
- Agrypnus lucidus Vats & Kashyap, 1992
- Agrypnus luctus (Fleutiaux, 1935)
- Agrypnus lupinosus (Candèze, 1857)
- Agrypnus lutosus (Candèze, 1857)
- Agrypnus macgregori (Fleutiaux, 1934)
- Agrypnus macleayi (Candèze, 1882)
- Agrypnus macroderus (Candèze, 1865)
- Agrypnus maculipennis (Schwarz, 1903)
- Agrypnus maculosus (Candèze, 1874)
- Agrypnus madecassus (Fleutiaux, 1932)
- Agrypnus maisus Vats & Kashyap, 1992
- Agrypnus major (Candèze, 1857)
- Agrypnus mamillatus (Candèze, 1857)
- Agrypnus mansuetus (Blackburn, 1892)
- Agrypnus marginatus (Candèze, 1874)
- Agrypnus marginipennis (Schwarz, 1903)
- Agrypnus marmoratus (Candèze, 1874)
- Agrypnus meridionalis (Fleutiaux, 1934)
- Agrypnus mikawaenis Ôhira, 1986
- Agrypnus minicephalus (Ôhira, 1970)
- Agrypnus minimus (Candèze, 1895)
- Agrypnus minor (Candèze, 1857)
- Agrypnus minutus (Schwarz, 1898)
- Agrypnus miser (Schwarz, 1905)
- Agrypnus miyakei Ôhira, 1967
- Agrypnus miyamotoi (Nakane & Kishii, 1955)
- Agrypnus mjobergi (Elston, 1930)
- Agrypnus mocquerysi (Fleutiaux, 1932)
- Agrypnus modestus (Candèze, 1857)
- Agrypnus mohanensis Vats & Kashyap, 1992
- Agrypnus molardi Girard, 2003
- Agrypnus molitor (Candèze, 1875)
- Agrypnus monachus (Candèze, 1882)
- Agrypnus montanus (Miwa, 1929)
- Agrypnus montisnimbae Girard, 1991
- Agrypnus morosus (Candèze, 1895)
- Agrypnus mozambicanus (Fleutiaux, 1932)
- Agrypnus mucoreus (Candèze, 1857)
- Agrypnus multipunctatus (Elston, 1927)
- Agrypnus murinus (Linnaeus, 1758)
- Agrypnus murrayensis (Blackburn, 1892)
- Agrypnus muscerda (Candèze, 1874)
- Agrypnus muscroides Kishii, 1995
- Agrypnus musculus (Candèze, 1857)
- Agrypnus mustellinus (Germar, 1840)
- Agrypnus muticus (Herbst, 1806)
- Agrypnus mysticus (Candèze, 1857)
- Agrypnus nagaoi (Ôhira, 1966)
- Agrypnus ngokoensis (Hayek, 1973)
- Agrypnus niger (Schwarz, 1905)
- Agrypnus nigrescens (W.J. Macleay, 1888)
- Agrypnus nigritus (Candèze, 1857)
- Agrypnus nivalis (Fleutiaux, 1934)
- Agrypnus nodicollis (Candèze, 1857)
- Agrypnus nodieri (Fleutiaux, 1934)
- Agrypnus nodifer (Kluge, 1833)
- Agrypnus nubilus (Candèze, 1857)
- Agrypnus obscurus (Fleutiaux, 1934)
- Agrypnus occidentalis Girard, 2003
- Agrypnus octavus (Candèze, 1874)
- Agrypnus oinodon Wurst, Schimmel & Platia, 2001
- Agrypnus omanensis Platia & Schimmel, 1997
- Agrypnus opacus (Candèze, 1900)
- Agrypnus orientalis Hope, 1843
- Agrypnus ornatellus (Candèze, 1889)
- Agrypnus ornatus (Candèze, 1857)
- Agrypnus orthoderus (Elston, 1924)
- Agrypnus oshimanus Ôhira, 1969
- Agrypnus paenulatus (Boheman, 1851)
- Agrypnus paleatus (Champion, 1894)
- Agrypnus palliatus (Candèze, 1893)
- Agrypnus palliditarsis (Candèze, 1857)
- Agrypnus pallidus (Candèze, 1887)
- Agrypnus palpalis (Candèze, 1882)
- Agrypnus pantherinus (Fleutiaux, 1934)
- Agrypnus parallelicollis (Candèze, 1857)
- Agrypnus parallelus (Candèze, 1874)
- Agrypnus parcus (Schwarz, 1903)
- Agrypnus pardalinus (Candèze, 1882)
- Agrypnus parviceps (Gyllenhal, 1817)
- Agrypnus parvulus (W.J. Macleay, 1888)
- Agrypnus parvus (Fleutiaux, 1934)
- Agrypnus pauliani (Fleutiaux, 1941)
- Agrypnus pauliani (Girard, 1970)
- Agrypnus pauper (Candèze, 1878)
- Agrypnus pecirkai (Jagemann, 1944)
- Agrypnus perplexus (Elston, 1924)
- Agrypnus pictilis (Schwarz, 1899)
- Agrypnus pictipennis (Candèze, 1857)
- Agrypnus pictiventris (Candèze, 1857)
- Agrypnus pictus (Candèze, 1878)
- Agrypnus pinguis (Candèze, 1893)
- Agrypnus pipitzi (Candèze, 1889)
- Agrypnus plagiatus (Candèze, 1878)
- Agrypnus planatus (Candèze, 1895)
- Agrypnus planocorpus Vats & Kashyap, 1992
- Agrypnus plantaferusus Vats & Kashyap, 1992
- Agrypnus planus Vats & Kashyap, 1992
- Agrypnus pleureticus (Candèze, 1874)
- Agrypnus polishaensis Ôhira, 1977
- Agrypnus porcinus (Candèze, 1857)
- Agrypnus porosus (Kluge, 1835)
- Agrypnus porrectus (Fleutiaux, 1934)
- Agrypnus porriginosus (Candèze, 1874)
- Agrypnus praelongus (Elston, 1927)
- Agrypnus praetextus (Fleutiaux, 1934)
- Agrypnus pretoriensis (Cobos, 1966)
- Agrypnus princeps (Candèze, 1874)
- Agrypnus procellosus (Candèze, 1895)
- Agrypnus productus (Elston, 1924)
- Agrypnus proximus (Fleutiaux, 1934)
- Agrypnus pujoli (Girard, 1969)
- Agrypnus pulvereus (Candèze, 1889)
- Agrypnus punctatissimus (Elston, 1927)
- Agrypnus punctipennis (Candèze, 1874)
- Agrypnus pupillus (Candèze, 1892)
- Agrypnus quadricollis (Fairmaire, 1903)
- Agrypnus quadrinotatus (Schwarz, 1908)
- Agrypnus quedenfeldti Hayek, 1973
- Agrypnus rajasthanensis Vats & Kashyap, 1992
- Agrypnus rameshi Vats & Kashyap, 1992
- Agrypnus rectangularis (Say, 1825)
- Agrypnus rectangulus (Schwarz, 1903)
- Agrypnus recticollis (Elston, 1930)
- Agrypnus reductus (Candèze, 1878)
- Agrypnus repercussus Vats & Kashyap, 1992
- Agrypnus reticulatus (Elston, 1930)
- Agrypnus robustus (Schwarz, 1903)
- Agrypnus rohanchaboti (Fleutiaux, 1922)
- Agrypnus rubescens (W.J. Macleay, 1888)
- Agrypnus rubicundulus (W.J. Macleay, 1888)
- Agrypnus rubiginosus (Candèze, 1882)
- Agrypnus rufopiceus (W.J. Macleay, 1888)
- Agrypnus rufulus (Elston, 1927)
- Agrypnus rufus (Blackburn, 1890)
- Agrypnus rugatus (Candèze, 1857)
- Agrypnus rugosus (Fleutiaux, 1934)
- Agrypnus rusticus (Candèze, 1893)
- Agrypnus ryukyuensis Kishii, 1985
- Agrypnus sakaguchii (Miwa, 1928)
- Agrypnus sakishimanus Ôhira, 1967
- Agrypnus saltatus Vats & Kashyap, 1992
- Agrypnus samburensis (Fleutiaux, 1919)
- Agrypnus sarikamisensis Platia, Yildirim & Kesdek, 2007
- Agrypnus sauteri (Ôhira, 1970)
- Agrypnus scaber (Candèze, 1857)
- Agrypnus scarrosus (Candèze, 1857)
- Agrypnus schwaneri (Candèze, 1874)
- Agrypnus schwarzi (Schenkling, 1925)
- Agrypnus scopulosus (Elston, 1924)
- Agrypnus scopus (Schwarz, 1902)
- Agrypnus scrofa (Candèze, 1873)
- Agrypnus sculptus (Candèze, 1874)
- Agrypnus scutellaris (Candèze, 1895)
- Agrypnus scutellatus (Candèze, 1857)
- Agrypnus semivestitus (Elston, 1927)
- Agrypnus senilis (Peringuey, 1892)
- Agrypnus septentrionalis (Fleutiaux, 1934)
- Agrypnus serricollis (Candèze, 1857)
- Agrypnus serrula (Candèze, 1857)
- Agrypnus setiger (Bates, 1866)
- Agrypnus setigerus (Bates, 1866)
- Agrypnus setosus (Schwarz, 1902)
- Agrypnus setulosus (Candèze, 1882)
- Agrypnus seyrigi (Fleutiaux, 1934)
- Agrypnus shirakii (Matsumura, 1910)
- Agrypnus silvaticus (Fleutiaux, 1932)
- Agrypnus silvicola Girard, 2003
- Agrypnus similis (Fleutiaux, 1934)
- Agrypnus simplex (Candèze, 1874)
- Agrypnus sinensis (Candèze, 1857)
- Agrypnus singularis (Fleutiaux, 1919)
- Agrypnus sinuatus (Candèze, 1857)
- Agrypnus sjostedti (Schwarz, 1908)
- Agrypnus socius (Candèze, 1874)
- Agrypnus solanensis Vats & Kashyap, 1992
- Agrypnus soleatus (Schwarz, 1857)
- Agrypnus sordidus (Candeze)
- Agrypnus souslapisus Vats & Kashyap, 1992
- Agrypnus spinaparamerus Vats & Kashyap, 1992
- Agrypnus spinifer (Candèze, 1889)
- Agrypnus spissicollis (Candèze, 1893)
- Agrypnus spretus (Candèze, 1882)
- Agrypnus squalescens (Fairmaire, 1871)
- Agrypnus squalidus (Fleutiaux, 1927)
- Agrypnus squamafraxineus Vats & Kashyap, 1992
- Agrypnus squameus (Szombathy, 1909)
- Agrypnus sternoviridis Vats & Kashyap, 1992
- Agrypnus stictus (Candèze, 1895)
- Agrypnus stigmosus (Elston, 1927)
- Agrypnus striatulus Vats & Kashyap, 1992
- Agrypnus stricticollis (Fairmaire, 1881)
- Agrypnus suarezi Hayek, 1973
- Agrypnus subargillus Vats & Kashyap, 1992
- Agrypnus subcarinulatus (Schwarz, 1908)
- Agrypnus subcervinus (Fleutiaux, 1916)
- Agrypnus subcompactus (Elston, 1927)
- Agrypnus subcylindricus (Schwarz, 1908)
- Agrypnus subfaenum Vats & Kashyap, 1992
- Agrypnus sublapideus Vats & Kashyap, 1992
- Agrypnus submarmoratus (Elston, 1924)
- Agrypnus subocellatus (Candèze, 1882)
- Agrypnus suboculatus (Candèze, 1882)
- Agrypnus subreductus (Girard, 1971)
- Agrypnus subsericeus (Candèze, 1878)
- Agrypnus subserratus (Quedenfeldt, 1886)
- Agrypnus substramentum Vats & Kashyap, 1992
- Agrypnus substriatus (Fleutiaux, 1934)
- Agrypnus subsulcatus Candèze, 1891
- Agrypnus subtilis (W.J. Macleay, 1888)
- Agrypnus subtuberculatus (Schwarz, 1898)
- Agrypnus suillus (Candèze, 1857)
- Agrypnus sulcicollis (Schwarz, 1908)
- Agrypnus taciturnus (Candèze, 1874)
- Agrypnus tactus (Candèze, 1874)
- Agrypnus taiwanus (Miwa, 1927)
- Agrypnus takasago Kishii, 1990
- Agrypnus tectus (Fleutiaux, 1935)
- Agrypnus tellinii (Fleutiaux, 1903)
- Agrypnus terminatus (Fleutiaux, 1934)
- Agrypnus testaceus (Schwarz, 1908)
- Agrypnus thibetanus (Reitter, 1913)
- Agrypnus thomasi Hayek, 1973
- Agrypnus thuligadensis Vats & Kashyap, 1992
- Agrypnus tigrinus (Fleutiaux, 1919)
- Agrypnus tonkinensis (Fleutiaux, 1927)
- Agrypnus torrefactus (Candèze, 1857)
- Agrypnus torresi (Candèze, 1897)
- Agrypnus tostus (Candèze, 1857)
- Agrypnus transversicollis (Fleutiaux, 1927)
- Agrypnus transversus (Candèze, 1857)
- Agrypnus triangularis (Schwarz, 1903)
- Agrypnus tripartitus (Candèze, 1874)
- Agrypnus triplehornorum (Knull, 1973)
- Agrypnus triticumunis Vats & Kashyap, 1992
- Agrypnus truncatus (Herbst, 1806)
- Agrypnus truquii (Candèze, 1874)
- Agrypnus tsukamotoi (Kishii, 1956)
- Agrypnus tsushimensis Ôhira, 1986
- Agrypnus tuberculatus (Candèze, 1874)
- Agrypnus tuberculipennis (Miwa, 1929)
- Agrypnus tuberculosus Vats & Kashyap, 1992
- Agrypnus tuberosus Vats & Kashyap, 1992
- Agrypnus turbidus (Germar, 1840)
- Agrypnus turkestanicus (Schwarz, 1902)
- Agrypnus tuspanensis (Candèze, 1857)
- Agrypnus uncatus (Hayek, 1979)
- Agrypnus unicolor (Hope, 1838)
- Agrypnus unicus (Fleutiaux, 1919)
- Agrypnus uidoensis Han & Park, 2009
- Agrypnus upadhyai Vats & Kashyap, 1992
- Agrypnus uraiensis (Miwa, 1929)
- Agrypnus ursulus (Candèze, 1857)
- Agrypnus validus (Elston, 1924)
- Agrypnus vandepolli (Candèze, 1887)
- Agrypnus variabilis (Candèze, 1857)
- Agrypnus variabilis Candèze, 1857
- Agrypnus variolus (Candèze, 1874)
- Agrypnus vatsai Vats & Kashyap, 1992
- Agrypnus venustus Girard, 1991
- Agrypnus versicolor (Fleutiaux, 1932)
- Agrypnus vestitus (Kluge, 1833)
- Agrypnus vicinus (Fleutiaux, 1919)
- Agrypnus victoriae (Candèze, 1865)
- Agrypnus viettei (Girard, 1970)
- Agrypnus vitalisi (Fleutiaux, 1918)
- Agrypnus wallacei (Candèze, 1874)
- Agrypnus yuppe (Kishii, 1964)
- Agrypnus zanzibaricus Hayek, 1973
- Agrypnus zietzi (Blackburn, 1895)
