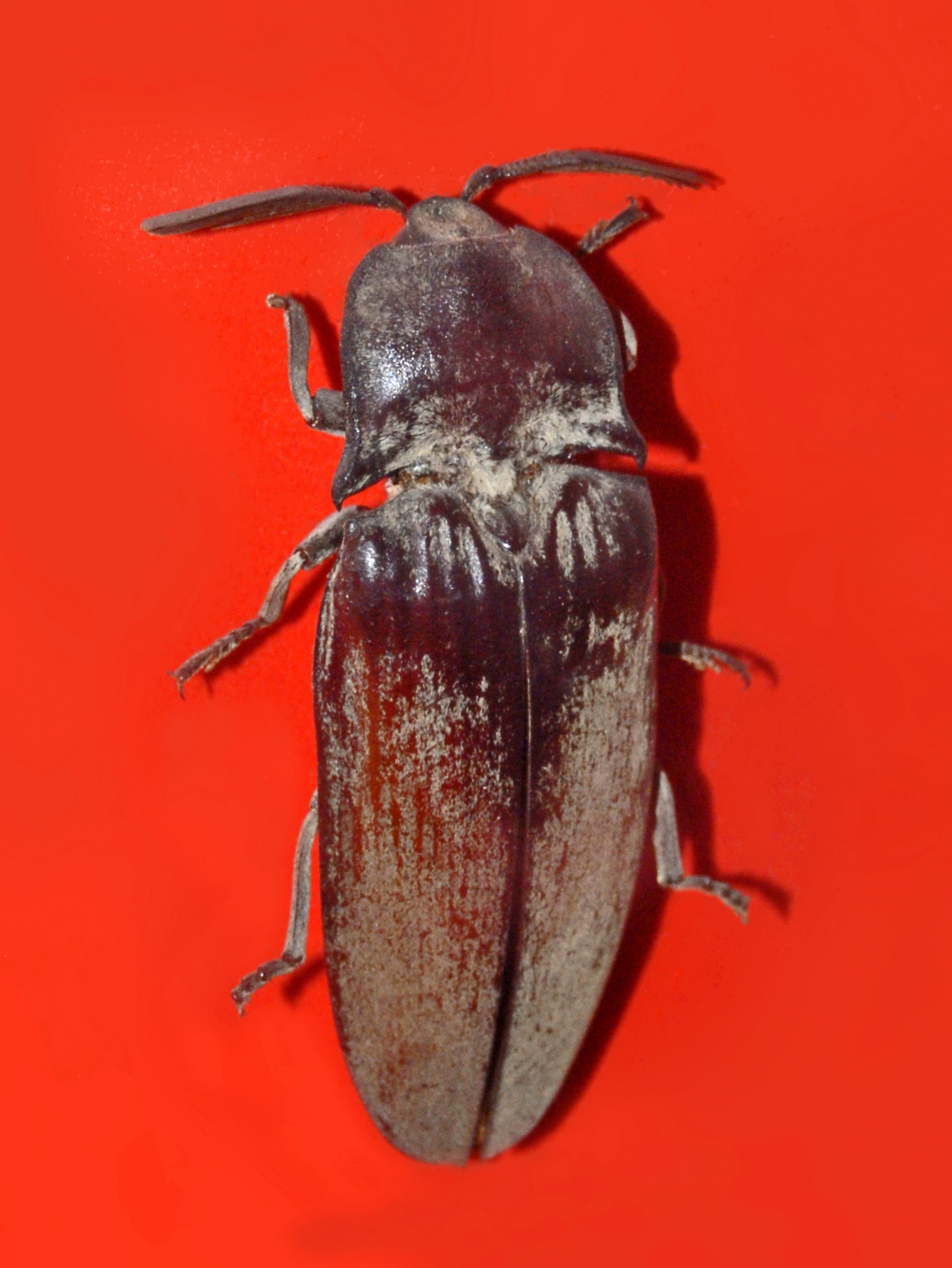
- Museum specimen of Tetralobus flabellicornis
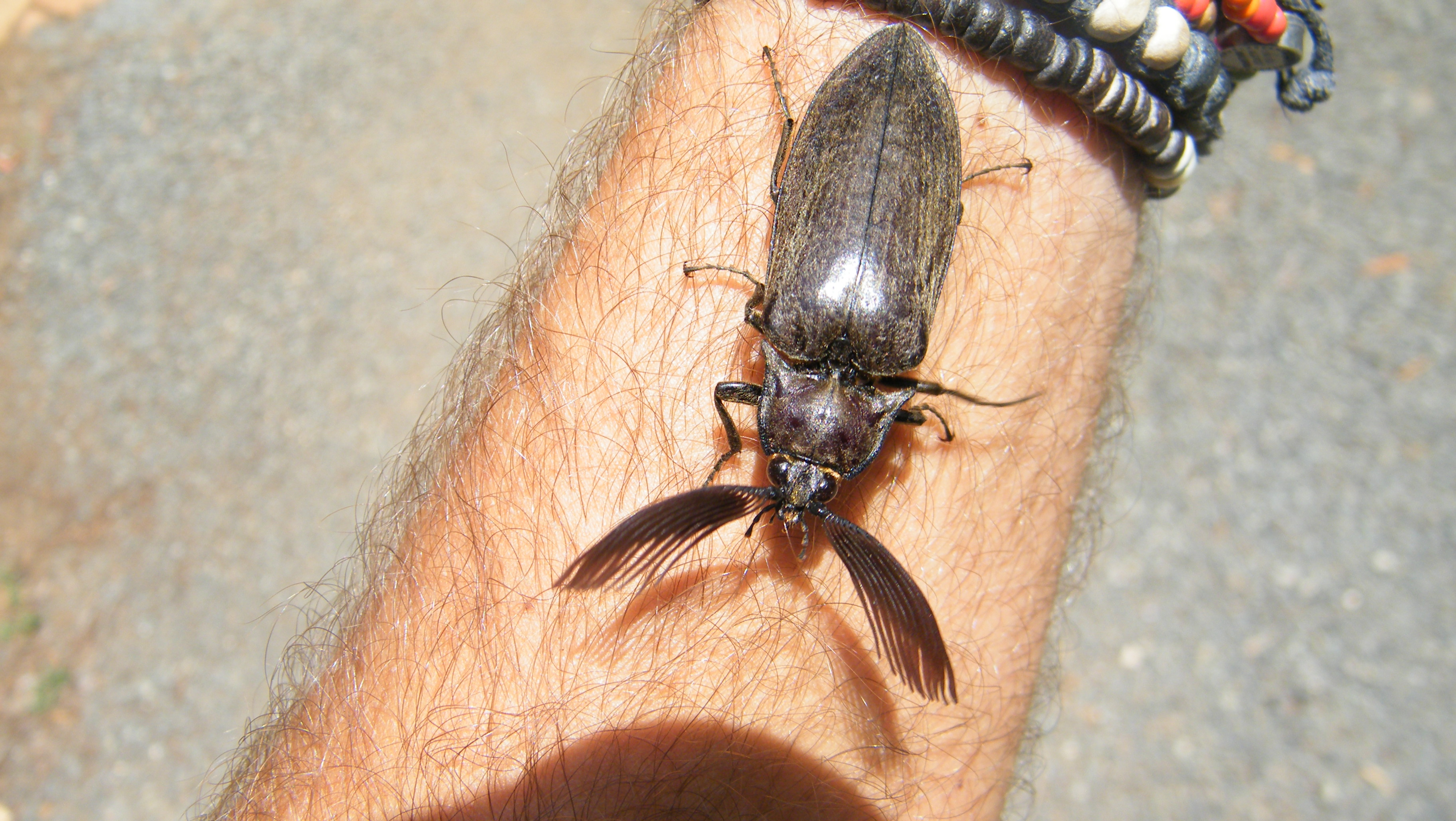
- Male specimen of Tetralobus flabellicornis

Scientific classification
- Kingdom: Animalia
- Phylum: Arthropoda
- Class: Insecta
- Order: Coleoptera
- Suborder: Polyphaga
- Infraorder: Elateriformia
- Family: Elateridae
- Subfamily: Agrypninae
- Genus: Tetralobus
- Species: T. flabellicornis

Binomial name
- Tetralobus flabellicornis (Linnaeus, 1767)

= Tetralobus flabellicornis =

Species of beetle

Tetralobus flabellicornis, the giant acacia click beetle, is a species of click beetle belonging to the family Elateridae.

== Description ==
Tetralobus flabellicornis can reach a length of 60–80 millimetres (2.4–3.1 in). This large click beetle has a dark brown to black body covered with a brownish grey pubescence, the latter showing a weak to medium reflectance in the near-infrared. The quite long antennae carry large lamellae in males, while they are serrate in females. Larvae live in the termite nests. These beetles feed on Acacia trees.

== Distribution and habitat ==
This species is widespread in South Africa, Namibia, Democratic Republic of Congo, Senegal, Zambia, Zanzibar, Liberia and Zaire. It lives in savannah and subtropical forests.

== See also ==
- Oxynopterus mucronatus
