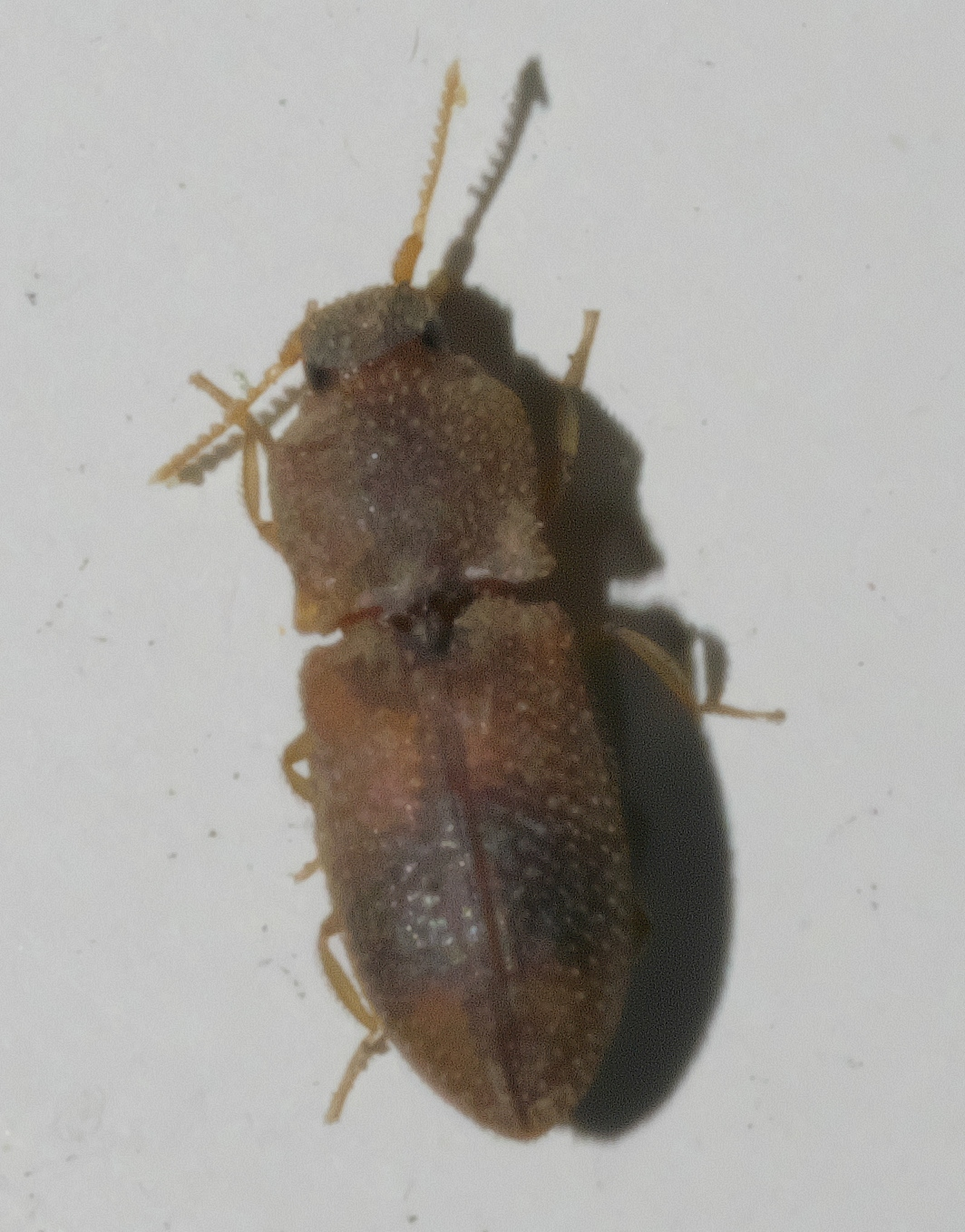
- Rismethus scobinula, Oklahoma

Scientific classification
- Kingdom: Animalia
- Phylum: Arthropoda
- Class: Insecta
- Order: Coleoptera
- Suborder: Polyphaga
- Infraorder: Elateriformia
- Family: Elateridae
- Subfamily: Agrypninae
- Tribe: Agrypnini
- Genus: Rismethus; Fleutiaux, 1947

= Rismethus =

Genus of beetles

Rismethus is a genus of click beetles in the family Elateridae. There are about 10 described species in Rismethus.

== Species ==
These species belong to the genus Rismethus:

- Rismethus degallieri Chassain, 2010
- Rismethus jiangi Qiu, 2025
- Rismethus mareki Chassain, 2010
- Rismethus pakistanicus Platia & Ahmed, 2016
- Rismethus pistrinarius (Candeze, 1857)
- Rismethus rainoni Platia & Coache, 2023
- Rismethus ryukyuensis Ohira, 1999 (temperate Asia)
- Rismethus scobinula (Candèze, 1857)
- Rismethus squamiger (Champion, 1894)
