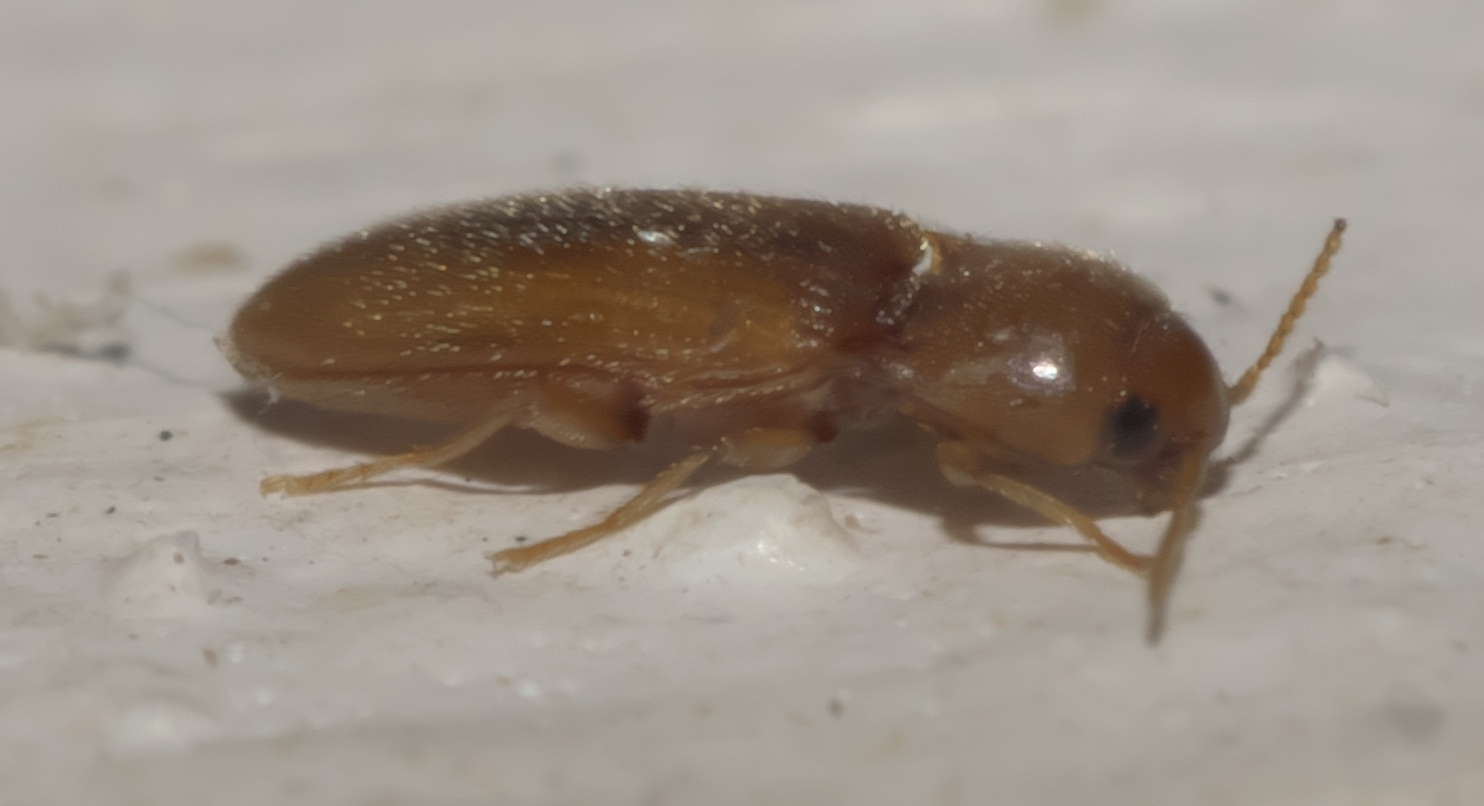

Scientific classification
- Kingdom: Animalia
- Phylum: Arthropoda
- Class: Insecta
- Order: Coleoptera
- Suborder: Polyphaga
- Infraorder: Elateriformia
- Family: Elateridae
- Tribe: Agriotini
- Genus: Glyphonyx; Candèze, 1863

= Glyphonyx =

Genus of beetles

Glyphonyx is a genus of click beetles in the family Elateridae. There are at least 50 described species in Glyphonyx.

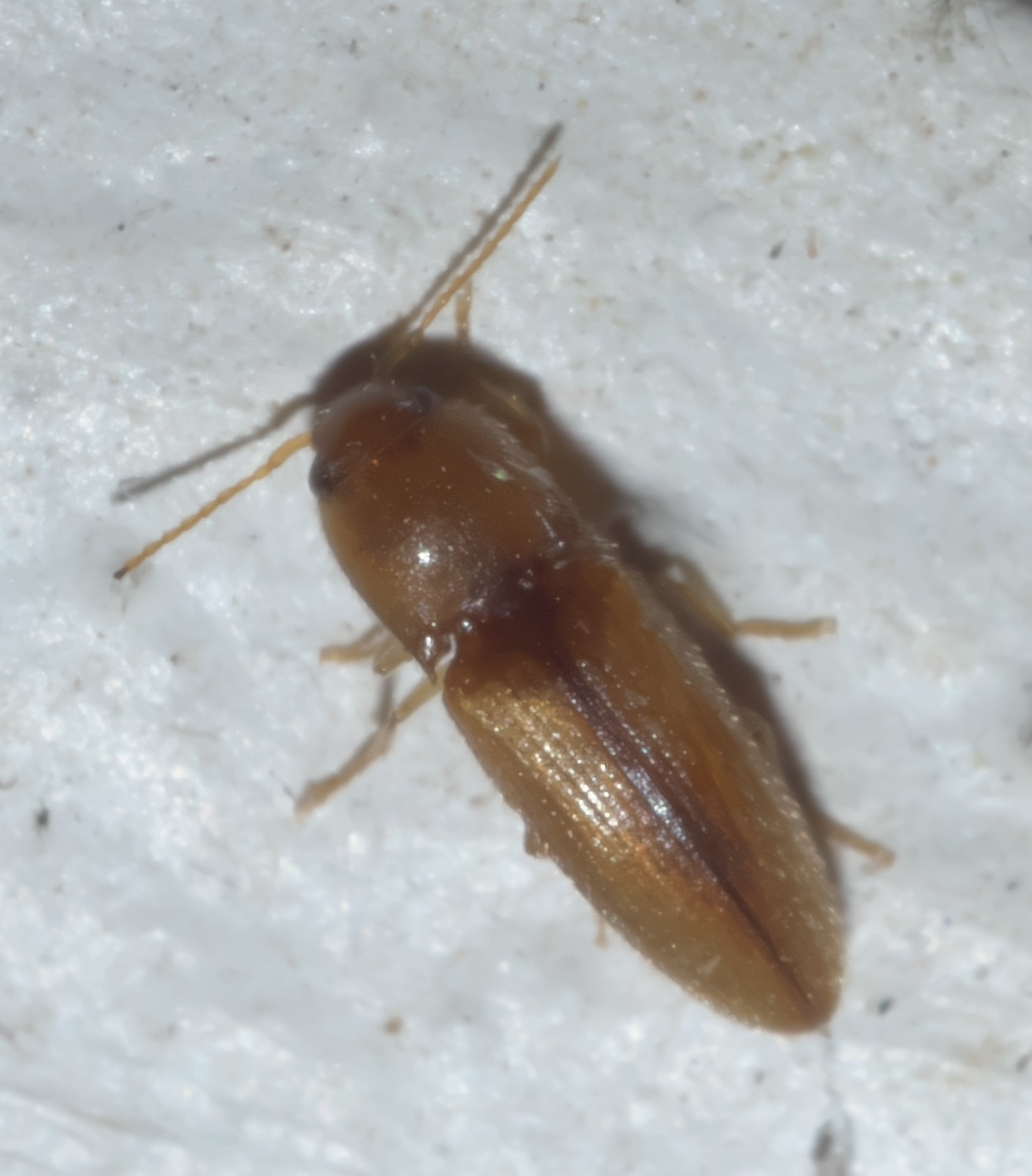

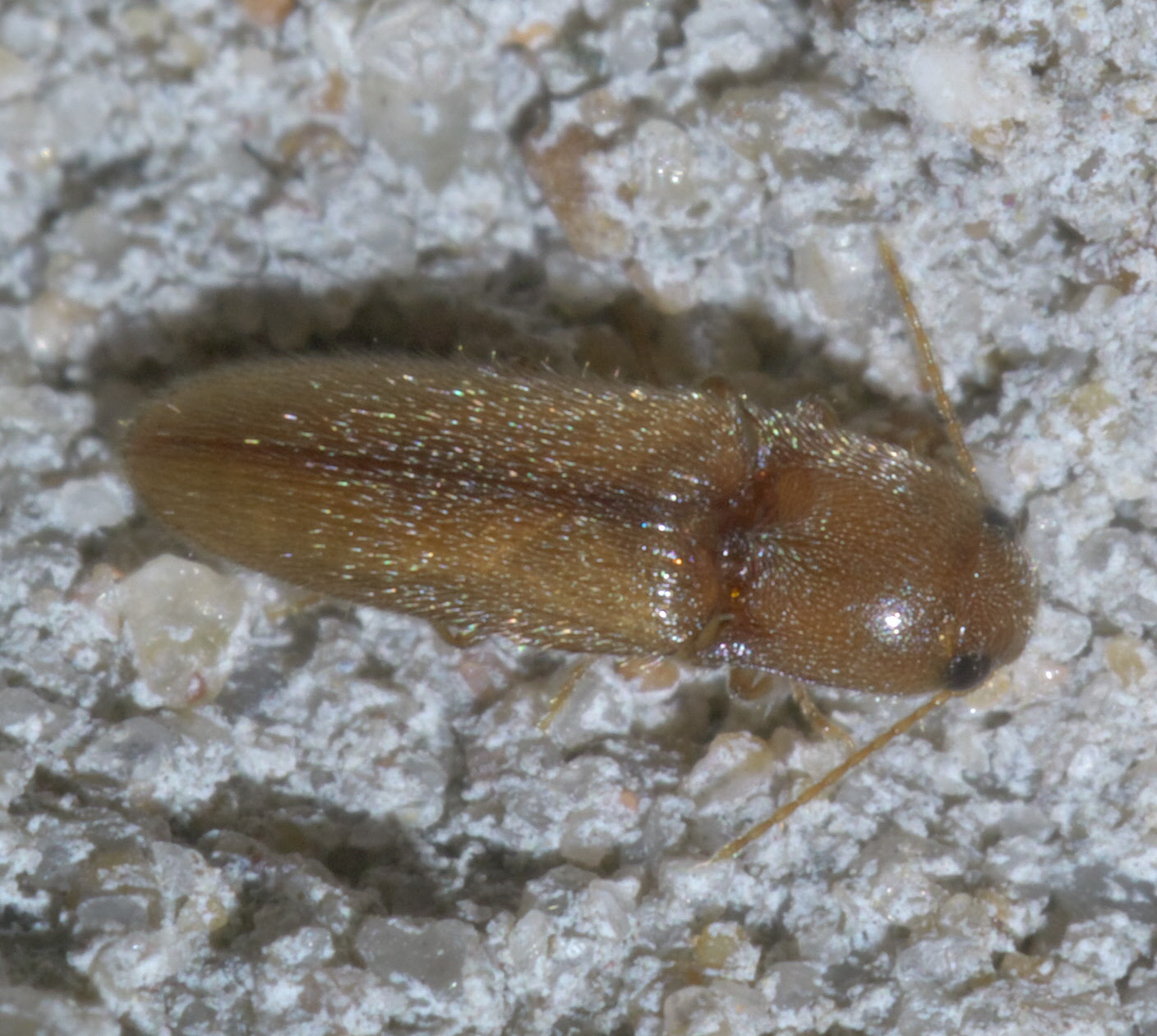

== Species ==
These 51 species belong to the genus Glyphonyx:

- Glyphonyx ami Kishii, 1991^{g}
- Glyphonyx apayao Kishii, 1991^{g}
- Glyphonyx arisanus Miwa, 1931^{g}
- Glyphonyx atayal Kishii, 1991^{g}
- Glyphonyx bimarginatus Schaeffer, 1916^{b}
- Glyphonyx brevistylus Smith & Balsbaugh, 1984^{b}
- Glyphonyx brunneipennis Miwa, 1931^{g}
- Glyphonyx cariei (Fleutiaux, 1920)^{g}
- Glyphonyx castaneus Miwa, 1931^{g}
- Glyphonyx chiapasensis Zaragoza-Caballero, 1990^{g}
- Glyphonyx chipenensis Kishii, 1994^{g}
- Glyphonyx exilis Kishii, 1991^{g}
- Glyphonyx ferruginosus Schaeffer, 1916^{b}
- Glyphonyx flavicollis Kishii, 1991^{g}
- Glyphonyx formosanus Ohira, 1972^{g}
- Glyphonyx fuscicollis Kishii, 1991^{g}
- Glyphonyx grossus Kishii, 1994^{g}
- Glyphonyx helix Smith & Balsbaugh^{b}
- Glyphonyx housaii Kishii, 1991^{g}
- Glyphonyx inquinatus (Say, 1834)^{b}
- Glyphonyx kankaui Miwa, 1931^{g}
- Glyphonyx kintaroui Kishii, 1991^{g}
- Glyphonyx knulli Smith & Balsbaugh, 1984^{b}
- Glyphonyx kulashi Smith & Balsbaugh, 1984^{b}
- Glyphonyx kuni Platia & Schimmel, 2007^{g}
- Glyphonyx laszlorum Platia & Schimmel, 2007^{g}
- Glyphonyx liukuiensis Kishii, 1989^{g}
- Glyphonyx longicornis Kishii, 1989^{g}
- Glyphonyx longipennis Ohira, 1966^{g}
- Glyphonyx longulus Miwa, 1930^{g}
- Glyphonyx marginalis Kishii, 1994^{g}
- Glyphonyx mimeticus Horn, 1874^{b}
- Glyphonyx muneaka Kishii, 1991^{g}
- Glyphonyx nanus Fleutiaux, 1940^{b}
- Glyphonyx nitidicollis Kishii, 1991^{g}
- Glyphonyx occidentalis^{g}
- Glyphonyx oiwakensis Kishii, 1991^{g}
- Glyphonyx paiwan Kishii, 1991^{g}
- Glyphonyx parallelaris Kishii, 1991^{g}
- Glyphonyx quietus (Say, 1839)^{b}
- Glyphonyx recticollis (Say, 1823)^{b}
- Glyphonyx rubiginosus Kishii, 1991^{g}
- Glyphonyx rubricollis Miwa, 1928^{g}
- Glyphonyx rufithorax Kishii, 1991^{g}
- Glyphonyx sauteri Miwa, 1931^{g}
- Glyphonyx shirozuanus Kishii, 1991^{g}
- Glyphonyx taiwan Kishii, 1991^{g}
- Glyphonyx taiwanus Kishii, 1991^{g}
- Glyphonyx takasago Kishii, 1989^{g}
- Glyphonyx testaceus (Melsheimer, 1845)^{b}
- Glyphonyx vunun Kishii, 1991^{g}

Data sources: i = ITIS, c = Catalogue of Life, g = GBIF, b = Bugguide.net
