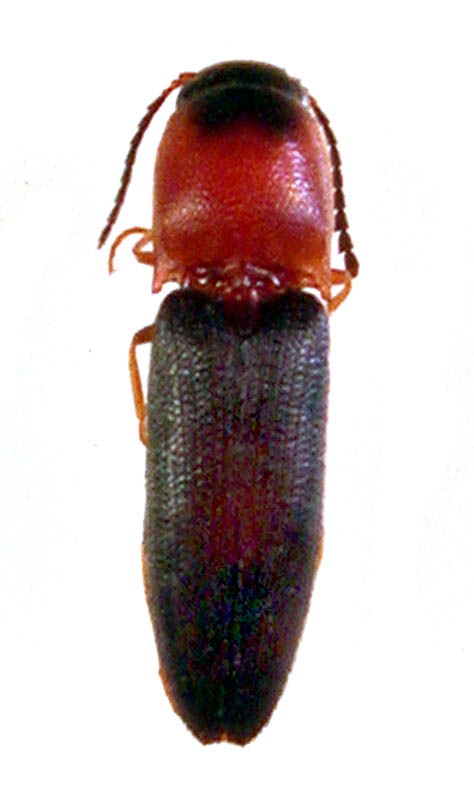
- Melanoxanthus anticus Candeze, 1859

Scientific classification
- Domain: Eukaryota
- Kingdom: Animalia
- Phylum: Arthropoda
- Class: Insecta
- Order: Coleoptera
- Suborder: Polyphaga
- Infraorder: Elateriformia
- Family: Elateridae
- Genus: Melanoxanthus; Eschscholtz, 1829

= Melanoxanthus =

Genus of beetles

Melanoxanthus is a genus of click beetles.

== List of species ==
- Melanoxanthus abdominalis Candèze, 1893
- Melanoxanthus abyssinus Candèze, 1865
- Melanoxanthus acutifrons Fleutiaux, 1934
- Melanoxanthus adamsoni (Van Zwaluwenburg, 1932)
- Melanoxanthus affinis Fleutiaux, 1914
- Melanoxanthus agranulosus Vats & Chauhan, 1992
- Melanoxanthus alluaudi Fleutiaux, 1933
- Melanoxanthus almaca Wurst, Schimmel & Platia, 2001
- Melanoxanthus ambiguus Schwarz, 1900
- Melanoxanthus angularis Candèze, 1878
- Melanoxanthus anticus Candèze, 1892
- Melanoxanthus approximatus Candèze, 1875
- Melanoxanthus archeducalis Heller, 1900
- Melanoxanthus arcuatus Van Zwaluwenburg, 1957
- Melanoxanthus ardjoenicus Candèze, 1882
- Melanoxanthus argus Van Zwaluwenburg, 1957
- Melanoxanthus ater Fleutiaux, 1914
- Melanoxanthus atripennis (W.J. Macleay, 1872)
- Melanoxanthus aurantiacus Candèze, 1893
- Melanoxanthus basalis Fleutiaux, 1934
- Melanoxanthus bella (Van Zwaluwenburg, 1932)
- Melanoxanthus bellulus Van Zwaluwenburg, 1948
- Melanoxanthus biarctus Carter, 1939
- Melanoxanthus bicinctus Fleutiaux, 1916
- Melanoxanthus bicolor Candèze, 1893
- Melanoxanthus bifasciatus Candèze, 1865
- Melanoxanthus biligatus Candèze, 1900
- Melanoxanthus bilineatus Fleutiaux, 1934
- Melanoxanthus bilunatus Candèze, 1865
- Melanoxanthus bimaculatus Fleutiaux, 1918
- Melanoxanthus binus Candèze, 1889
- Melanoxanthus bipartitus Candèze, 1875
- Melanoxanthus biplagiatus Candeze
- Melanoxanthus bistellatus Candèze, 1893
- Melanoxanthus bitriplex Candèze, 1897
- Melanoxanthus brevicornis Fleutiaux
- Melanoxanthus butuanus Fleutiaux, 1916
- Melanoxanthus caledonicus (Fleutiaux, 1891)
- Melanoxanthus carinulatus Schwarz, 1902
- Melanoxanthus cinnamomeus Candèze, 1893
- Melanoxanthus circumcinctus Candèze, 1900
- Melanoxanthus columbinus Carter, 1939
- Melanoxanthus comes Candèze, 1897
- Melanoxanthus comosus Candèze, 1889
- Melanoxanthus comptus (Van Zwaluwenburg, 1928)
- Melanoxanthus confusus Candèze, 1880
- Melanoxanthus consimilis Fleutiaux, 1935
- Melanoxanthus contracta (Van Zwaluwenburg, 1932)
- Melanoxanthus convexa (Van Zwaluwenburg, 1932)
- Melanoxanthus cracens Van Zwaluwenburg, 1957
- Melanoxanthus crucifer Fleutiaux, 1914
- Melanoxanthus cuneatus Candèze, 1865
- Melanoxanthus cuneiformis Candèze, 1882
- Melanoxanthus cuneolus (Schwarz, 1902)
- Melanoxanthus cylindricus Candèze, 1880
- Melanoxanthus cylindriformis Candèze
- Melanoxanthus decemguttatus Candèze, 1875
- Melanoxanthus decemmaculatus Candèze, 1883
- Melanoxanthus decemnotatus Candèze, 1878
- Melanoxanthus decimus Candèze, 1878
- Melanoxanthus dilaticollis Candèze, 1882
- Melanoxanthus dimidiatus Candèze, 1878
- Melanoxanthus discicollis Schwarz
- Melanoxanthus discoidalis Schwarz, 1902
- Melanoxanthus dissitus Van Zwaluwenburg, 1957
- Melanoxanthus divergens Van Zwaluwenburg, 1957
- Melanoxanthus dohrni Schwarz, 1902
- Melanoxanthus dolosus Candèze, 1865
- Melanoxanthus doriae Candèze, 1878
- Melanoxanthus ducalis Candèze, 1882
- Melanoxanthus elongatus Fleutiaux, 1895
- Melanoxanthus epitrotus Candèze, 1865
- Melanoxanthus exclamationis Candèze, 1875
- Melanoxanthus exiguus Van Zwaluwenburg, 1931
- Melanoxanthus eximius Schwarz, 1902
- Melanoxanthus exitiosus Candèze, 1897
- Melanoxanthus fasciata (Van Zwaluwenburg, 1932)
- Melanoxanthus ferrugineus Candèze, 1891
- Melanoxanthus festivus Van Zwaluwenburg, 1957
- Melanoxanthus festucalis Candèze, 1900
- Melanoxanthus filiformis Candèze, 1882
- Melanoxanthus finitimus Fleutiaux, 1932
- Melanoxanthus flavangularis Schwarz, 1906
- Melanoxanthus flavangulus Candèze, 1865
- Melanoxanthus flavidus (Candèze, 1878)
- Melanoxanthus flavipes Fleutiaux, 1928
- Melanoxanthus flavithorax Schimmel, 2004
- Melanoxanthus flavobasalis Schwarz
- Melanoxanthus flavocinctus Candèze, 1900
- Melanoxanthus flavosignatus Carter, 1939
- Melanoxanthus fleutiauxi Fairmaire, 1901
- Melanoxanthus florensis Candèze, 1882
- Melanoxanthus fractus Candèze, 1878
- Melanoxanthus francoisi Fleutiaux, 1938
- Melanoxanthus frictus Candèze, 1894
- Melanoxanthus frivolus Candèze, 1900
- Melanoxanthus froggatti (W.J. Macleay, 1888)
- Melanoxanthus fumosus Schwarz, 1900
- Melanoxanthus fusiformis Fleutiaux
- Melanoxanthus fusus Candèze, 1897
- Melanoxanthus futilis (Candèze, 1887)
- Melanoxanthus geminatus Schwarz, 1902
- Melanoxanthus geminus Candèze, 1894
- Melanoxanthus glyphonides Van Zwaluwenburg, 1931
- Melanoxanthus gourvesi Chassain, 2001
- Melanoxanthus gracilis Candèze, 1900
- Melanoxanthus grandis (Van Zwaluwenburg, 1932)
- Melanoxanthus grandis Fleutiaux, 1934
- Melanoxanthus granum Candèze, 1887
- Melanoxanthus guamensis Van Zwaluwenburg, 1942
- Melanoxanthus guttatus Candeze
- Melanoxanthus guttulatus Candèze, 1865
- Melanoxanthus haddeni Fleutiaux, 1932
- Melanoxanthus hebridanus Fleutiaux, 1938
- Melanoxanthus hemionus Candèze, 1893
- Melanoxanthus hermosa (Van Zwaluwenburg, 1943)
- Melanoxanthus illustris Fleutiaux, 1921
- Melanoxanthus imitator Candèze, 1893
- Melanoxanthus inaequalis Candeze
- Melanoxanthus infuscatus Fleutiaux, 1916
- Melanoxanthus ingridae Schimmel, 2004
- Melanoxanthus insignus Fleutiaux, 1921
- Melanoxanthus insolitus Carter, 1939
- Melanoxanthus insularis (Van Zwaluwenburg, 1932)
- Melanoxanthus insularis Fleutiaux, 1922
- Melanoxanthus jucundus Carter, 1939
- Melanoxanthus lamottei Girard, 1971
- Melanoxanthus lansbergei Candèze, 1882
- Melanoxanthus lariversi Van Zwaluwenburg, 1957
- Melanoxanthus latemaculatus Fleutiaux, 1928
- Melanoxanthus lateplagiatus Fairmaire
- Melanoxanthus lateralis Fleutiaux, 1932
- Melanoxanthus lativittis Carter, 1939
- Melanoxanthus lepidus Van Zwaluwenburg, 1957
- Melanoxanthus litura Candèze, 1865
- Melanoxanthus luteicollis Fleutiaux, 1928
- Melanoxanthus luzonicus Fleutiaux, 1914
- Melanoxanthus maculicollis Fleutiaux, 1933
- Melanoxanthus madagascariensis Fleutiaux, 1932
- Melanoxanthus major Candèze, 1900
- Melanoxanthus melanocephalus (Fabricius, 1781)
- Melanoxanthus melanurus Candèze, 1878
- Melanoxanthus minor Van Zwaluwenburg, 1957
- Melanoxanthus minutus Candèze, 1897
- Melanoxanthus mirabilis (Fleutiaux, 1928)
- Melanoxanthus mocquerysi Fleutiaux, 1933
- Melanoxanthus montana (Van Zwaluwenburg, 1932)
- Melanoxanthus mumfordi (Van Zwaluwenburg, 1932)
- Melanoxanthus nana (Van Zwaluwenburg, 1932)
- Melanoxanthus niger Schwarz, 1901
- Melanoxanthus nigricornis Candèze
- Melanoxanthus nigripennis Fleutiaux, 1928
- Melanoxanthus nigriventris Candèze, 1889
- Melanoxanthus nigrosignatus Candèze, 1890
- Melanoxanthus nitidicollis Fleutiaux, 1916
- Melanoxanthus obscura (Van Zwaluwenburg, 1932)
- Melanoxanthus ornatus Fleutiaux, 1934
- Melanoxanthus pachyderoides Schwarz, 1902
- Melanoxanthus paeninsularis Chassain, 2001
- Melanoxanthus palawanensis Ôhira, 1974
- Melanoxanthus palliatus Candèze, 1892
- Melanoxanthus partitus Candèze, 1878
- Melanoxanthus parvulus Fleutiaux, 1934
- Melanoxanthus petersoni Ôhira, 1974
- Melanoxanthus plagiellus Schwarz, 1902
- Melanoxanthus princeps Candèze, 1900
- Melanoxanthus promecus Candèze, 1865
- Melanoxanthus proximus Candèze, 1878
- Melanoxanthus puerulus Candèze, 1898
- Melanoxanthus pusillus Candèze, 1865
- Melanoxanthus quadrilineatus Schwarz, 1902
- Melanoxanthus quadrillum Candèze, 1865
- Melanoxanthus quadrinotatus Candèze, 1865
- Melanoxanthus quadripunctatus Candèze, 1859
- Melanoxanthus quadrivittatus Candèze, 1897
- Melanoxanthus quintus Candèze, 1894
- Melanoxanthus ramusculus Candèze, 1865
- Melanoxanthus recreatus Candèze, 1897
- Melanoxanthus remota (Van Zwaluwenburg, 1932)
- Melanoxanthus rhomboidalis Candèze, 1875
- Melanoxanthus rimosus (Boheman, 1858)
- Melanoxanthus rotundicollis (Fleutiaux, 1891)
- Melanoxanthus ruficollis Candèze, 1878
- Melanoxanthus rufinus Candèze, 1865
- Melanoxanthus rufoniger Carter, 1939
- Melanoxanthus rufotactus Candèze, 1878
- Melanoxanthus ruptus Candèze, 1883
- Melanoxanthus sannio Van Zwaluwenburg, 1957
- Melanoxanthus schawalleri Schimmel, 2004
- Melanoxanthus schwarzi Schenkling, 1925
- Melanoxanthus semiruber Carter, 1939
- Melanoxanthus semitinctus (Boheman, 1859)
- Melanoxanthus senegalensis Candeze
- Melanoxanthus sexguttatus Candèze, 1892
- Melanoxanthus sextus Candèze, 1875
- Melanoxanthus sicardi Fleutiaux, 1933
- Melanoxanthus silus Van Zwaluwenburg, 1957
- Melanoxanthus silvestris (Van Zwaluwenburg, 1932)
- Melanoxanthus similatus Schwarz, 1902
- Melanoxanthus similis Van Zwaluwenburg, 1957
- Melanoxanthus simplex Van Zwaluwenburg, 1957
- Melanoxanthus sonani Miwa, 1934
- Melanoxanthus subcylindricus Candèze, 1865
- Melanoxanthus subhumeralis Schwarz, 1902
- Melanoxanthus suturalis Schwarz
- Melanoxanthus taeniatus Candèze, 1878
- Melanoxanthus terminatus Candèze, 1875
- Melanoxanthus tetraspilotus Fairmaire, 1883
- Melanoxanthus tricolor Candèze, 1893
- Melanoxanthus tulagi Van Zwaluwenburg, 1934
- Melanoxanthus uncinatus Candèze, 1897
- Melanoxanthus unicolor Candèze, 1897
- Melanoxanthus unipunctatus Candèze, 1894
- Melanoxanthus usingeri Van Zwaluwenburg, 1942
- Melanoxanthus ustulatus Schwarz
- Melanoxanthus varians Van Zwaluwenburg, 1957
- Melanoxanthus venustus Van Zwaluwenburg, 1957
- Melanoxanthus vicinus Fleutiaux, 1916
- Melanoxanthus vitiensis (Van Zwaluwenburg, 1932)
- Melanoxanthus vittatus Candèze, 1865
- Melanoxanthus vittipennis Schwarz, 1901
- Melanoxanthus wenzelorum Schimmel, 2004
- Melanoxanthus xanthographus Motschulsky, 1859
- Melanoxanthus yushiroi W. Suzuki, 1999
