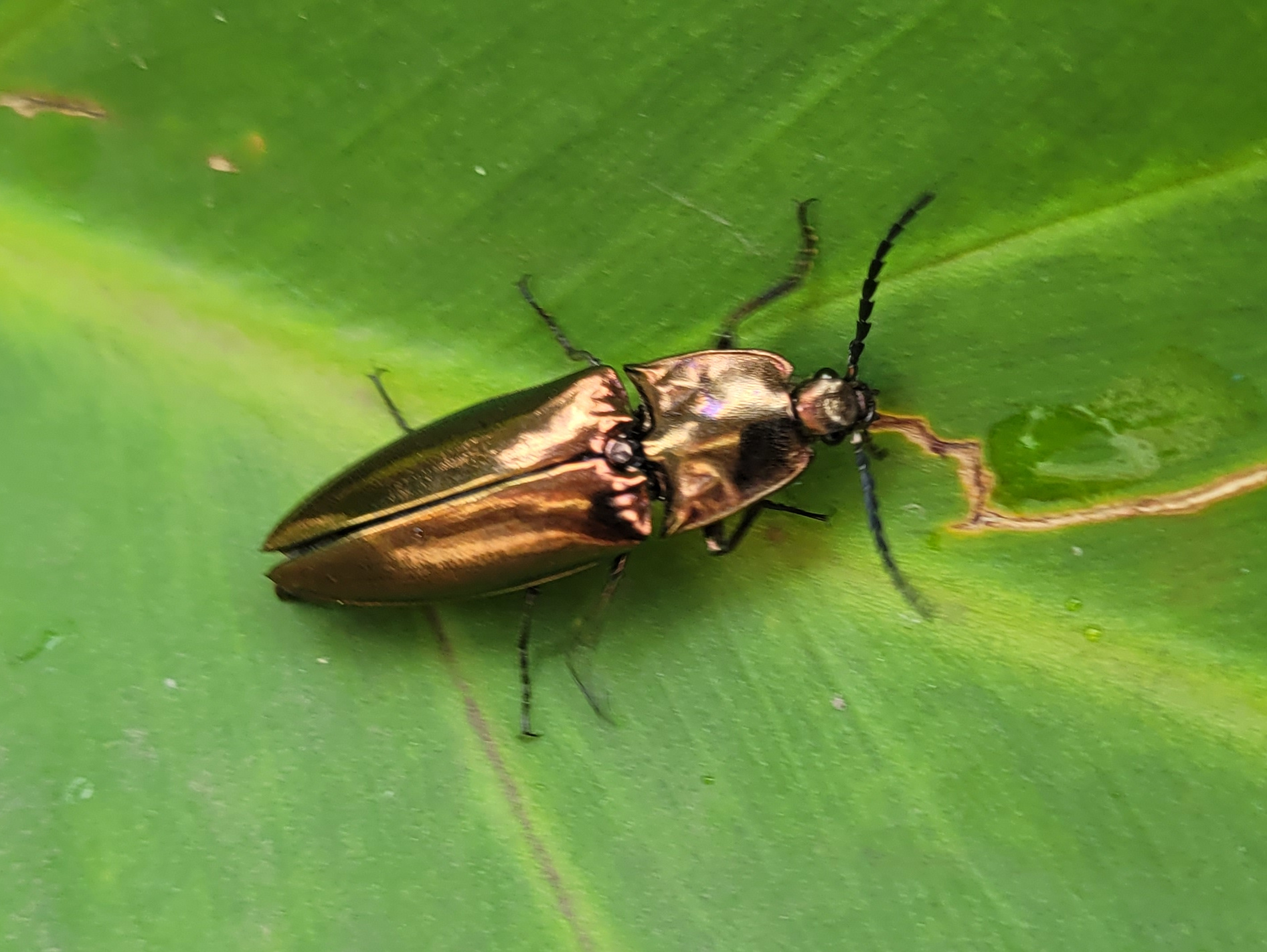
- Campsosternus rutilans in Bukidnon, Philippines
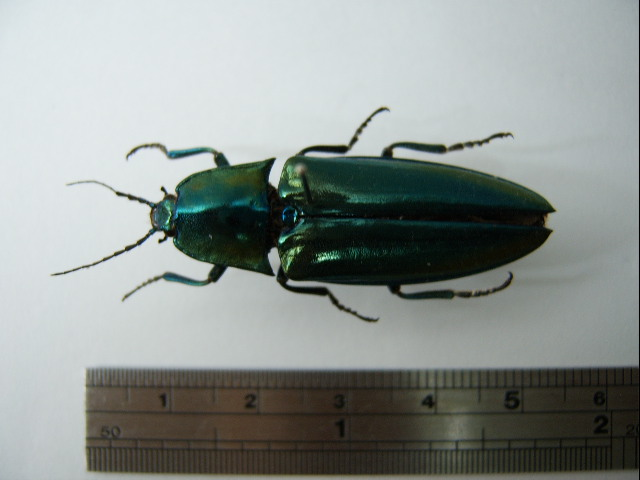
- Campsosternus auratus in Taipei, Taiwan

Scientific classification
- Kingdom: Animalia
- Phylum: Arthropoda
- Clade: Pancrustacea
- Class: Insecta
- Order: Coleoptera
- Suborder: Polyphaga
- Infraorder: Elateriformia
- Family: Elateridae
- Tribe: Oxynopterini
- Genus: Campsosternus; Latreille, 1834

Species
- See text

Synonyms
- Camposternus (Fowler, 1912); Camposternus (Chenu, 1860); Camposternus (Fleutiaux, 1927); Camposternus (Miwa, 1929); Camposternus (Hope, 1842)

= Campsosternus =

Campsosternus Temporal range: 37.2–0 Ma

Genus of beetles

Campsosternus is a genus of click beetles in the subfamily Dendrometrinae. The genus is extant but there is at least one described species from the Eocene of the Czech Republic.

== Description of some species ==
There are many species, including:

- Campsosternus auratus
- †Campsosternus atavus - a fossil species found in an Eocene lacustrine small diatomite in Kutschlin near Bilin, in the Czech Republic
- Campsosternus dohrni
- Campsosternus gemma - the Rainbow sheath click beetle (彩虹叩頭蟲 in Chinese), a protected species in Taiwan
- Campsosternus hopei
- Campsosternus rutilans
- Campsosternus stephensi
- Campsosternus templetoni - name is a tribute to Robert Templeton (1802–1892), a naturalist, artist and entomologist

== See also ==
- List of click beetle genera of India
