= Edmond Jean-Baptiste Fleutiaux =

French entomologist

Edmond Jean Baptiste Fleutiaux (22 October 1858, Argenteuil, Val-d'Oise – 1951) was a French entomologist who specialised in Coleoptera.

Fleutiaux worked on the beetle fauna of Southeast Asia, particularly French Indochina and Africa. He wrote Catalogue systématique des Cicindelidae décruits depuis Linné (1892) and Revision des Eucnemides africains (1945). His collection is conserved by the Muséum national d'histoire naturelle. Fleutiaux was a member of the Société entomologique de France.
