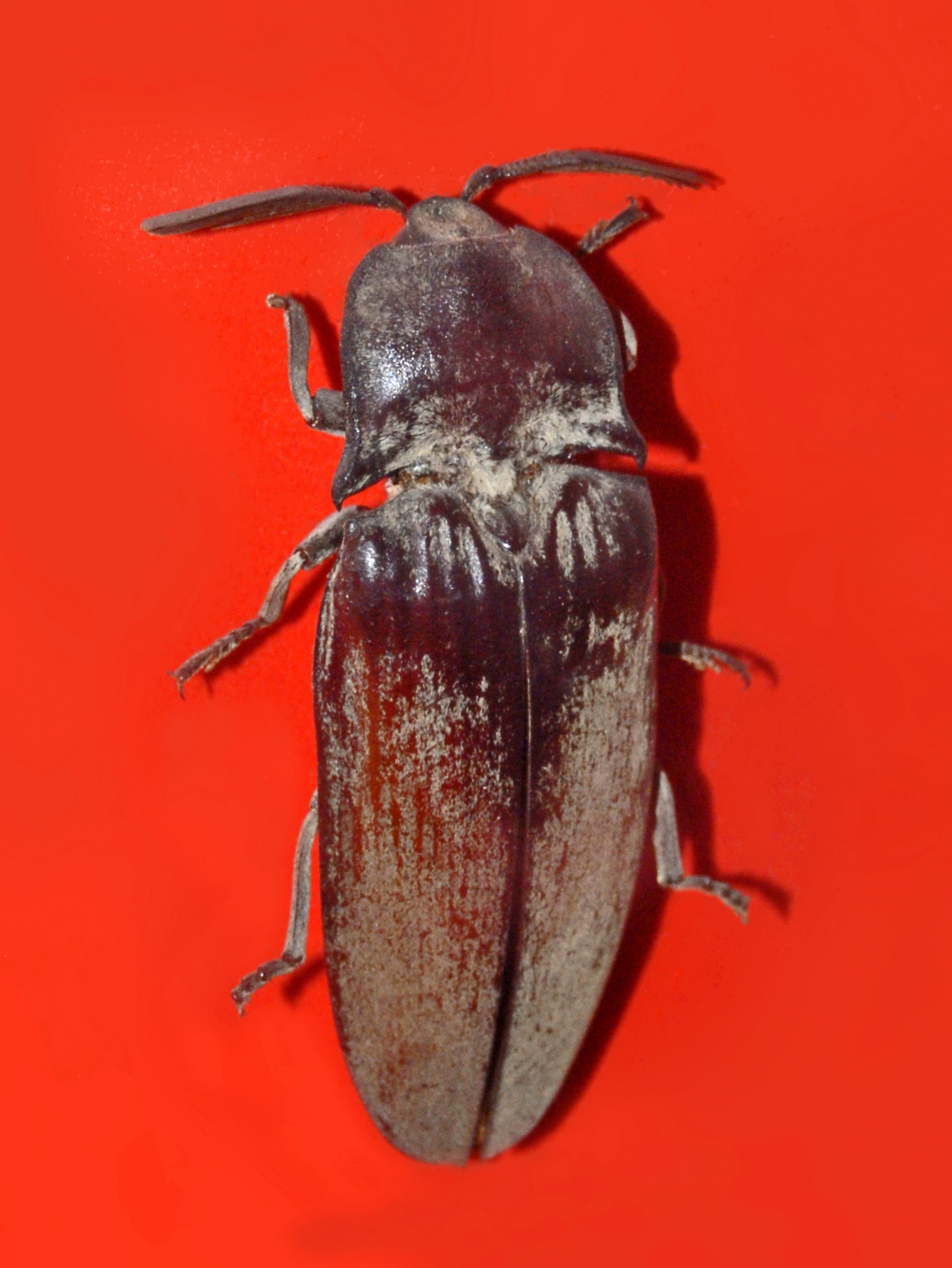
- Museum specimen of Tetralobus flabellicornis

Scientific classification
- Kingdom: Animalia
- Phylum: Arthropoda
- Class: Insecta
- Order: Coleoptera
- Suborder: Polyphaga
- Infraorder: Elateriformia
- Family: Elateridae
- Subfamily: Agrypninae
- Genus: Tetralobus; Lepeletier & Serville, 1828

= Tetralobus =

Genus of beetles

Tetralobus is a genus of click beetle belonging to the family Elateridae.

== Species ==
- Tetralobus arbonnieri Girard, 2003
- Tetralobus cavifrons Fairmaire, 1887
- Tetralobus flabellicornis (Linnaeus, 1767) - Giant Acacia Click Beetle
- Tetralobus gigas (Fabricius, 1801)
- Tetralobus natalensis Candèze, 1857
- Tetralobus rotundifrons Guérin-Méneville
- Tetralobus scutellaris Schwarz
- Tetralobus shuckhardi (Hope, 1842
