= List of click beetle species recorded in Great Britain =

The following is a list of the click beetle (family Elateridae) species recorded in Great Britain. For other beetles, see List of beetle species recorded in Britain.

- Agrypnus murinus (Linnaeus, 1758)
- Lacon querceus (Herbst, 1784)
- Hypnoidus riparius (Fabricius, 1793)
- Actenicerus siaelandicus (O. F. Müller, 1764)
- Anostirus castaneus (Linnaeus, 1758)
- Ctenicera cuprea (Fabricius, 1775)
- Ctenicera pectinicornis (Linnaeus, 1758)
- Calambus bipustulatus (Linnaeus, 1767)
- Aplotarsus angustulus (Kiesenwetter, 1858)
- Aplotarsus incanus (Gyllenhal, 1827)
- Paraphotistus impressus (Fabricius, 1793)
- Paraphotistus nigricornis (Panzer, 1799)
- Prosternon tessellatum (Linnaeus, 1758)
- Selatosomus aeneus (Linnaeus, 1758)
- Selatosomus cruciatus (Linnaeus, 1758)
- Selatosomus melancholicus (Fabricius, 1798)
- Cidnopus aeruginosus (Olivier, 1790)
- Kibunea minuta (Linnaeus, 1758)
- Limoniscus violaceus (P. W. J. Müller, 1821)
- Denticollis linearis (Linnaeus, 1758)
- Athous haemorrhoidalis (Fabricius, 1801)
- Athous vittatus (Fabricius, 1793)
- Athous subfuscus (O. F. Müller, 1764)
- Athous bicolor (Goeze, 1777)
- Athous campyloides Newman, 1833
- Diacanthous undulatus (De Geer, 1774)
- Stenagostus rhombeus (Olivier, 1790)
- Hemicrepidius hirtus (Herbst, 1784)
- Adrastus pallens (Fabricius, 1793)
- Adrastus rachifer (Fourcroy, 1785)
- Synaptus filiformis (Fabricius, 1781)
- Agriotes acuminatus (Stephens, 1830)
- Agriotes lineatus (Linnaeus, 1767)
- Agriotes obscurus (Linnaeus, 1758)
- Agriotes pallidulus (Illiger, 1807)
- Agriotes sordidus (Illiger, 1807)
- Agriotes sputator (Linnaeus, 1758)
- Dalopius marginatus (Linnaeus, 1758)
- Ampedus balteatus (Linnaeus, 1758)
- Ampedus cardinalis (Schiødte, 1865)
- Ampedus cinnabarinus (Eschscholtz, 1829)
- Ampedus elongantulus (Fabricius, 1787)
- Ampedus nigerrimus (Boisduval & Lacordaire, 1835)
- Ampedus nigrinus (Herbst, 1784)
- Ampedus pomonae (Stephens, 1830)
- Ampedus pomorum (Herbst, 1784)
- Ampedus quercicola ( R. du Buysson, 1887)
- Ampedus rufipennis (Stephens, 1830)
- Ampedus sanguineus (Linnaeus, 1758)
- Ampedus sanguinolentus (Schrank, 1776)
- Ampedus tristis (Linnaeus, 1758)
- Brachygonus ruficeps (Mulsant & Guillebeau, 1855)
- Ischnodes sanguinicollis (Panzer, 1793)
- Megapenthes lugens (Redtenbacher, 1842)
- Procraerus tibialis (Boisduval & Lacordaire, 1835)
- Elater ferrugineus Linnaeus, 1758
- Sericus brunneus (Linnaeus, 1758)
- Panspaeus guttatus Sharp, 1877
- Melanotus castanipes (Paykull, 1800)
- Melanotus punctolineatus (Pelerin, 1829)
- Melanotus villosus (Geoffroy in Fourcroy, 1785)
- Fleutiauxellus maritimus (Curtis, 1840)
- Negastrius arenicola (Boheman, 1852)
- Negastrius pulchellus (Linnaeus, 1761)
- Negastrius sabulicola (Boheman, 1851)
- Oedostethus quadripustulatus (Fabricius, 1793)
- Zorochros meridionalis (Laporte, 1840)
- Zorochros minimus (Boisduval & Lacordaire, 1835)
- Cardiophorus asellus Erichson, 1840
- Cardiophorus gramineus (Scopoli, 1763)
- Cardiophorus ruficollis (Linnaeus, 1758)
- Cardiophorus vestigialis Erichson, 1840
- Dicronychus equisetioides Lohse, 1976
