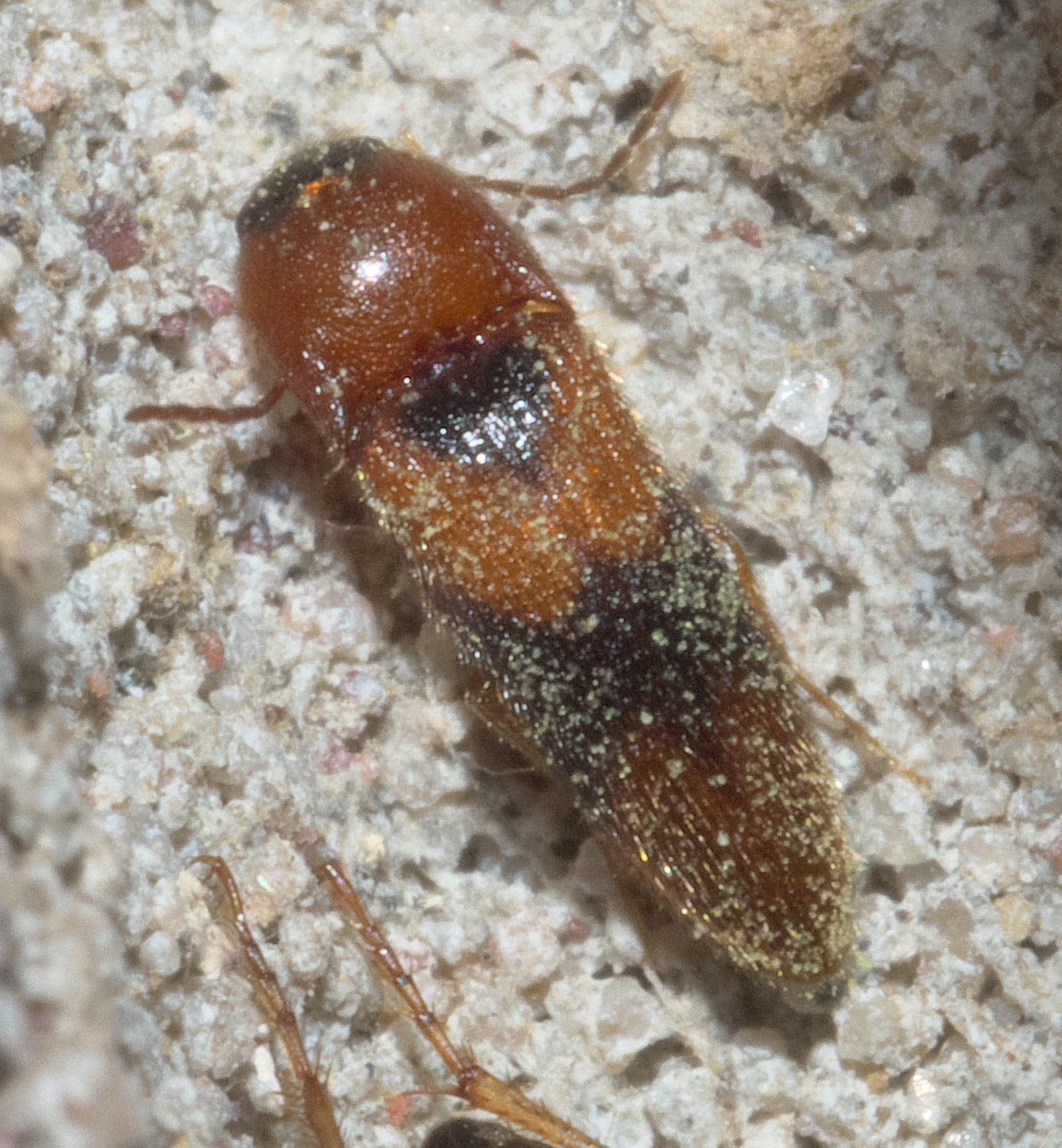
- Ampedus areolatus

Scientific classification
- Kingdom: Animalia
- Phylum: Arthropoda
- Class: Insecta
- Order: Coleoptera
- Suborder: Polyphaga
- Infraorder: Elateriformia
- Family: Elateridae
- Subfamily: Elaterinae
- Tribe: Ampedini
- Genus: Ampedus; Dejean, 1833

Diversity
- at least 461 species

= Ampedus =

Genus of beetles

Ampedus is a genus of click beetles in the family Elateridae. There are currently 461 recognized species of Ampedus beetles. It has a cosmopolitan distribution, but is found mostly in the Holarctic region, primarily in North America, Europe, and Asia. The oldest known fossil from this genus was found in Eocene Baltic amber, estimated to be from 38.0 to 33.9 million years ago.

== Natural history ==
=== Life cycle ===
Ampedus larvae burrow in rotting wood, pupating in mid-summer. The larvae feed on wood, with a preference for wood in more advanced stages of decay, and are also observed to be cannibalistic on other saproxylic larvae. They emerge as adults a few weeks later, but remain in the pupal cell through the following winter. Adult Ampedus beetles are thought to be diurnal. As adults, they are pollen-feeders, found in large numbers on flowers and vegetation. Ampedus females attract males for mating through chemical communication, using specialized pheromone glands, and lay their eggs in fallen wood to develop. Life cycle duration has been estimated to range from less than one year for smaller species, to up to 4–5 years for larger ones.

=== Habitat ===
Ampedus beetles are primarily found in temperate forests, with a preference for higher altitudes. They are generalists, with a single species often found in both hardwood and softwood, and on multiple different tree species. In North America, they are most commonly collected from deciduous forests in the East and from coniferous forests in the West.

== Description ==
North American species of Ampedus beetles vary in size from 3-4mm, up to 13-14mm. Their coloration is variable, even within species, but they are often bicolored. They can be identified by their complete, downturned, rounded frontal carina, and excavated prosternal sutures. Like the larvae of other Elaterids (wireworms), Ampedus larvae are elongate, hard, and subcyclindrical. The ninth abdominal segment, which varies in shape between elaterid larvae, is rounded in this genus, ending in a sharp point. Ampedus larvae have pointed nasales, featuring a single tooth.

== Taxonomy ==
The genus was originally named by the French entomologist Pierre François Marie Auguste Dejean in 1833, previously Elater. One taxonomic study of the genera within the tribe Ampedini, which used nuclear and mitochondrial data, found monophyly of Ampedus to be highly supported. Another molecular study using DNA barcoding data found Ampedus to be paraphyletic, with the genus Reitterelator nested within it. Megapenthes is the most closely related North American genus to Ampedus.

== Conservation status ==
According to the IUCN Red List, multiple species of European Ampedus beetles are considered endangered, mostly due to the threats posed by logging and wood harvesting to saproxylic beetles. They are also negatively impacted by salvage logging, the practice of removing wind-thrown trees after storms and other natural disturbances.

== Species ==
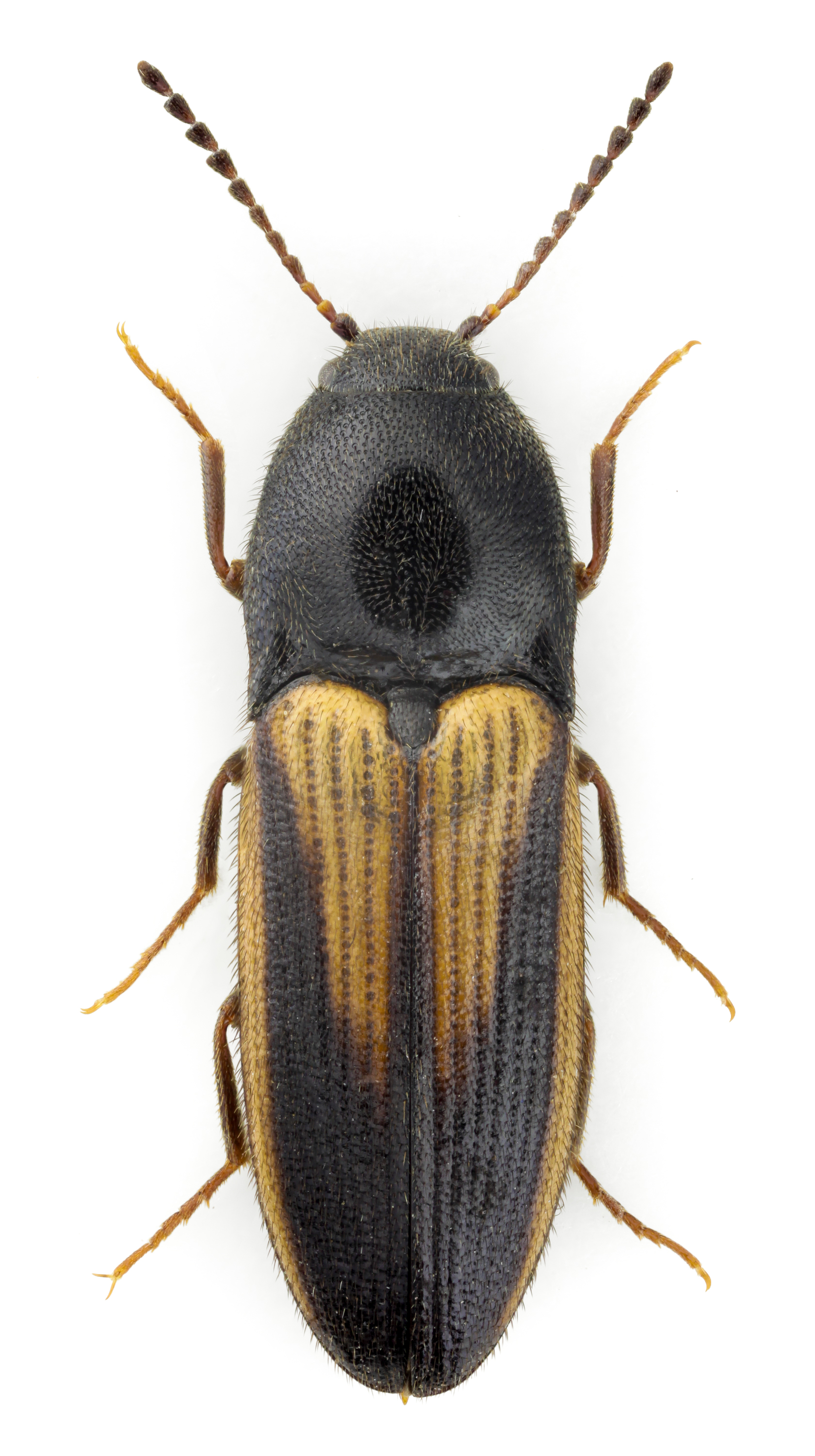
Ampedus tristis

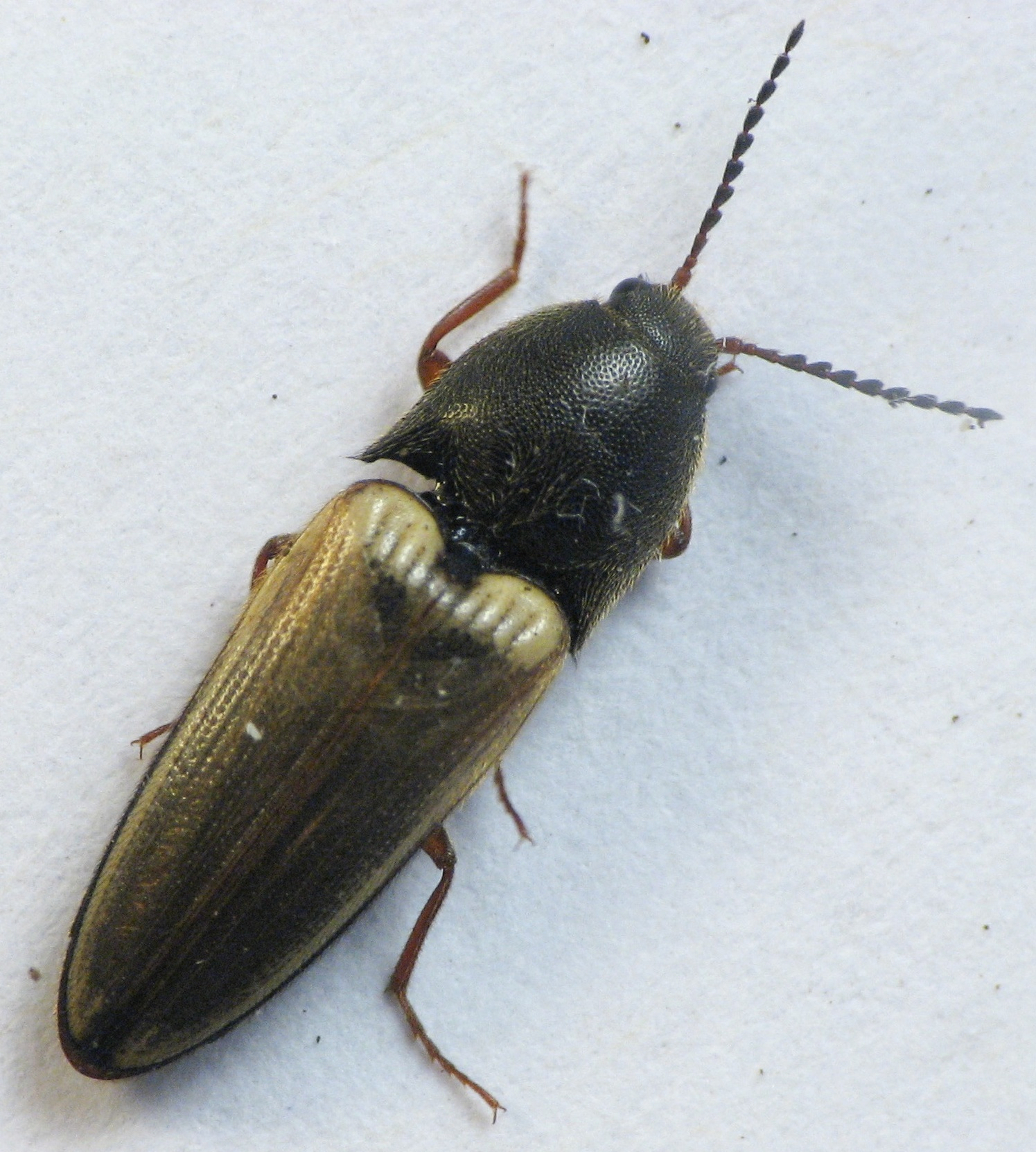
Ampedus nigricollis

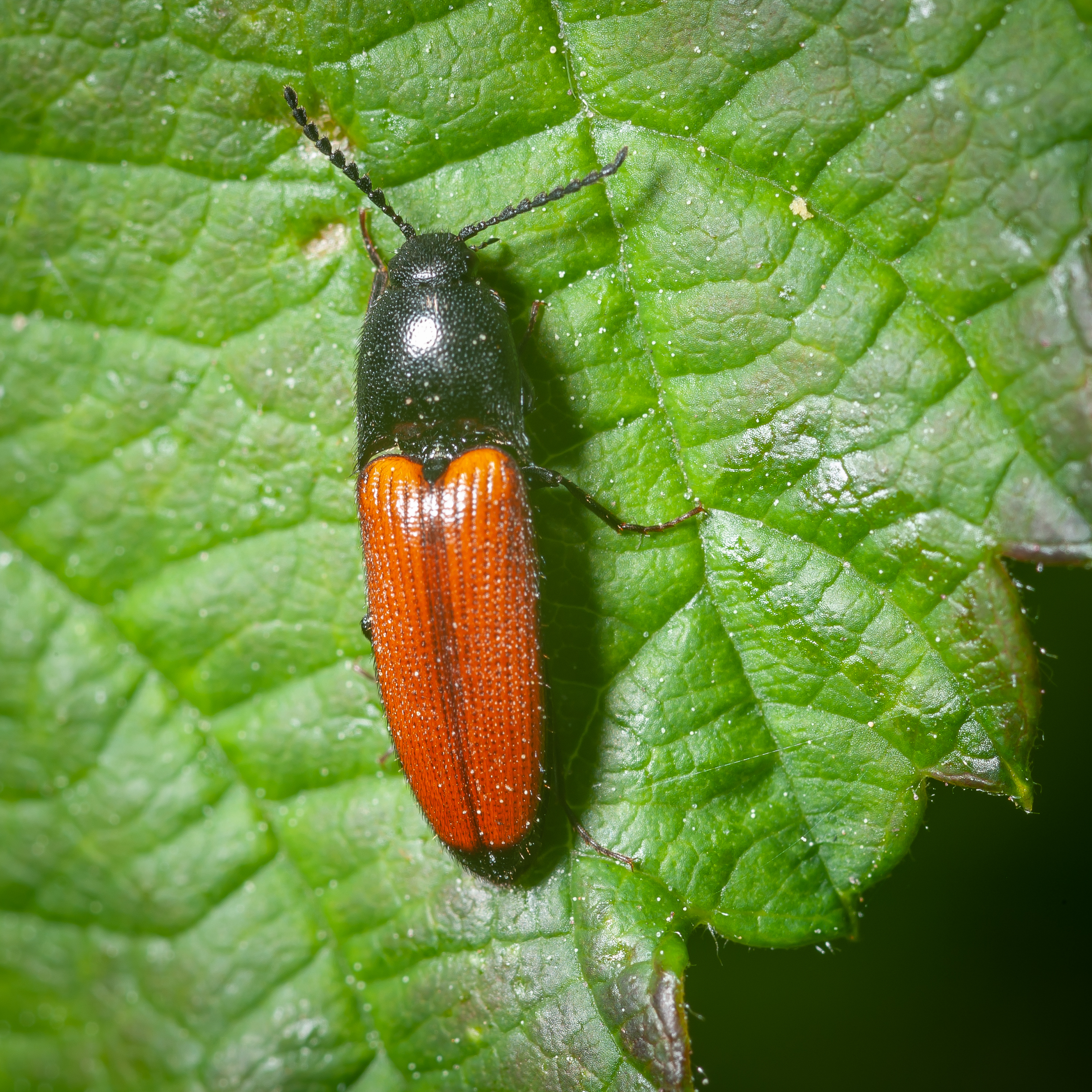
Ampedus elongatulus
- Ampedus aethiops (Lacordaire, 1835)
- Ampedus amamiensis Ôhira, 1968
- Ampedus anthracinus (LeConte, 1869)
- Ampedus apicalis (Reitter, 1889)
- Ampedus apicatus (Say, 1834)
- Ampedus areolatus (Say, 1823)
- Ampedus aritai Ohira & SatO, 1964
- Ampedus assingi Schimmel, 1996
- Ampedus atripennis (Horn, 1871)
- Ampedus azurescens (Candeze, 1865)
- Ampedus balcanicus Dolin, 1983
- Ampedus balteatus (Linnaeus, 1758)
- Ampedus behrensi (Horn, 1871)
- Ampedus brevis (Van Dyke, 1932)
- Ampedus callegarii Platia & Gudenzi, 2000
- Ampedus canalicollis (Lewis, 1894)
- Ampedus canaliculatus (Reitter, 1918)
- Ampedus carbonicolor (Eschscholtz, 1829)
- Ampedus carbunculus (Lewis, 1879)
- Ampedus cardinalis (Schiödte, 1865)
- Ampedus carinthiacus Bouwer, 1984
- Ampedus cinnaberinus (Eschscholtz, 1829)
- Ampedus coenobita (Costa, 1881)
- Ampedus collaris (Say, 1825)
- Ampedus cordifer (LeConte, 1859)
- Ampedus fastus (LeConte, 1884)
- Ampedus forticornis (Schwarz, 1900)
- Ampedus francolinus Bouwer, 1984
- Ampedus fuentei Sanchez-Ruiz, 1996
- Ampedus fuscatus (Melsheimer, 1846)
- Ampedus glycereus (Herbst, 1784)
- Ampedus hispanicus Platia & Gudenzi, 1999
- Ampedus hypogastricus (Candèze,1873)
- Ampedus impressicollis Bouwer, 1984
- Ampedus japonicus Silfverberg, 1977
- Ampedus karneri Schimmel, 1996
- Ampedus koschwitzi Schimmel, 1990
- Ampedus laesus (LeConte, 1853)
- Ampedus linteus (Say, 1839)
- Ampedus luctuosus (LeConte, 1853)
- Ampedus macedonicus Schimmel, 1996
- Ampedus magistrettii Platia & Schimmel, 1988
- Ampedus mannerheimi Suzuki, 2013
- Ampedus melanotoides Brown, 1933
- Ampedus melsheimeri (Leng, 1918)
- Ampedus militaris (Harris, 1836)
- Ampedus minos Wurst, 1997
- Ampedus mixtus (Herbst, 1806)
- Ampedus moerens (LeConte, 1861)
- Ampedus nigricans Germar, 1844
- Ampedus nigricollis (Herbst, 1806)
- Ampedus nigrinus (Herbst, 1784)
- Ampedus nigroflavus (Goeze, 1777)
- Ampedus occidentalis Lane, 1971
- Ampedus ochrinulus (Reitter, 1887)
- Ampedus ochropterus Germar, 1844
- Ampedus ogatai Kishii, 1983
- Ampedus optabilis (Lewis, 1894)
- Ampedus oregonus (Schaeffer, 1916)
- Ampedus orientalis (Lewis, 1894)
- Ampedus patricius (Gurjeva, 1957)
- Ampedus pauxillus (Lewis, 1894)
- Ampedus phelpsii (Horn 1874)
- Ampedus phoenicopterus Germar, 1844
- Ampedus pomonae (Stephens, 1830)
- Ampedus pomorum (Herbst, 1784)
- Ampedus pooti Wurst, 1995
- Ampedus praeustus (Fabricius, 1792)
- Ampedus pulcher (Baudi, 1871)
- Ampedus pullus Germar, 1844
- Ampedus puniceus (Lewis, 1879)
- Ampedus pusio Germar, 1844
- Ampedus pyrenaeus Zeising, 1981
- Ampedus quadrisignatus (Gyllenhal, 1817)
- Ampedus quebecensis Brown, 1933
- Ampedus rhodopus (LeConte, 1857)
- Ampedus rubricollis (Herbst, 1806)
- Ampedus rubricus (Say, 1825)
- Ampedus rugosus Schimmel, 1982
- Ampedus sanguineus (Linnaeus, 1758)
- Ampedus sanguinipennis (Say, 1823)
- Ampedus sanguinolentus (Schrank, 1776)
- Ampedus sayi (LeConte, 1853)
- Ampedus sellatus (Leng, 1918)
- Ampedus semicinctus (Randall, 1838)
- Ampedus sinuatus Germar, 1844
- Ampedus soboensis Ohira, 1963
- Ampedus subcostatus (Kolbe, 1886)
- Ampedus talamellii Platia & Gudenzi, 2000
- Ampedus tamba Kishii, 1976
- Ampedus tenuistriatus (Lewis, 1894)
- Ampedus tokugoensis W. Suzuki, 1985
- Ampedus tristis (Linnaeus, 1758)
- Ampedus vandalitae Lohse, 1976
- Ampedus varipilis (Van Dyke, 1932)
- Ampedus vitiosus (LeConte, 1853)
- Ampedus xanthomus Germar, 1844
- Ampedus ziegleri Zeising & Sieg, 1983
- † Ampedus seyfriedii Heer, 1847
