= Athous tauricola =

Scientific classification
- Kingdom: Animalia
- Phylum: Arthropoda
- Class: Insecta
- Order: Coleoptera
- Suborder: Polyphaga
- Infraorder: Elateriformia
- Family: Elateridae
- Genus: Athous
- Species: A. tauricola

Binomial name
- Athous tauricola Reitter, 1905

Species of beetle

Athous tauricola is a species of brown-coloured click beetle from the family Elateridae which can be found on the Crimean peninsula and Ukraine.
