= Megapenthes caprella =

Scientific classification
- Domain: Eukaryota
- Kingdom: Animalia
- Phylum: Arthropoda
- Class: Insecta
- Order: Coleoptera
- Suborder: Polyphaga
- Infraorder: Elateriformia
- Family: Elateridae
- Genus: Megapenthes
- Species: M. caprella

Binomial name
- Megapenthes caprella (LeConte, 1859)

Species of beetle

Megapenthes caprella is a species of click beetle in the family Elateridae.
