= Athous propinquus =

Scientific classification
- Domain: Eukaryota
- Kingdom: Animalia
- Phylum: Arthropoda
- Class: Insecta
- Order: Coleoptera
- Suborder: Polyphaga
- Infraorder: Elateriformia
- Family: Elateridae
- Genus: Athous
- Species: A. propinquus

Binomial name
- Athous propinquus Buysson, 1889

Species of beetle

Athous propinquus is a species of click beetle from the family Elateridae which is found in Bulgaria and the European part of Turkey. The species is 10 millimetres (0.39 in) long.
