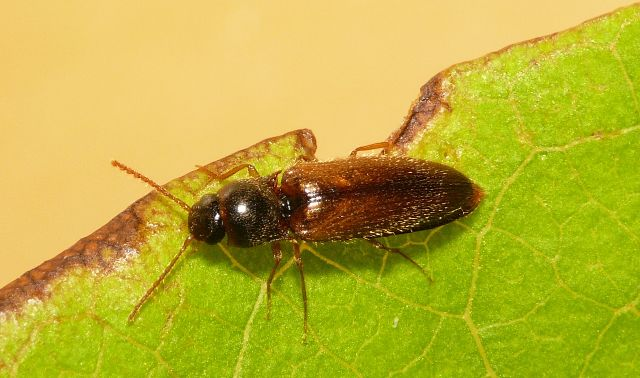

Scientific classification
- Kingdom: Animalia
- Phylum: Arthropoda
- Class: Insecta
- Order: Coleoptera
- Suborder: Polyphaga
- Infraorder: Elateriformia
- Family: Elateridae
- Genus: Adrastus

= Adrastus (beetle) =

Genus of beetles

Adrastus is a genus of beetles belonging to the family Elateridae.

The species of this genus are found in Europe.

Species:

- Adrastus rachifer
- Adrastus pallens
