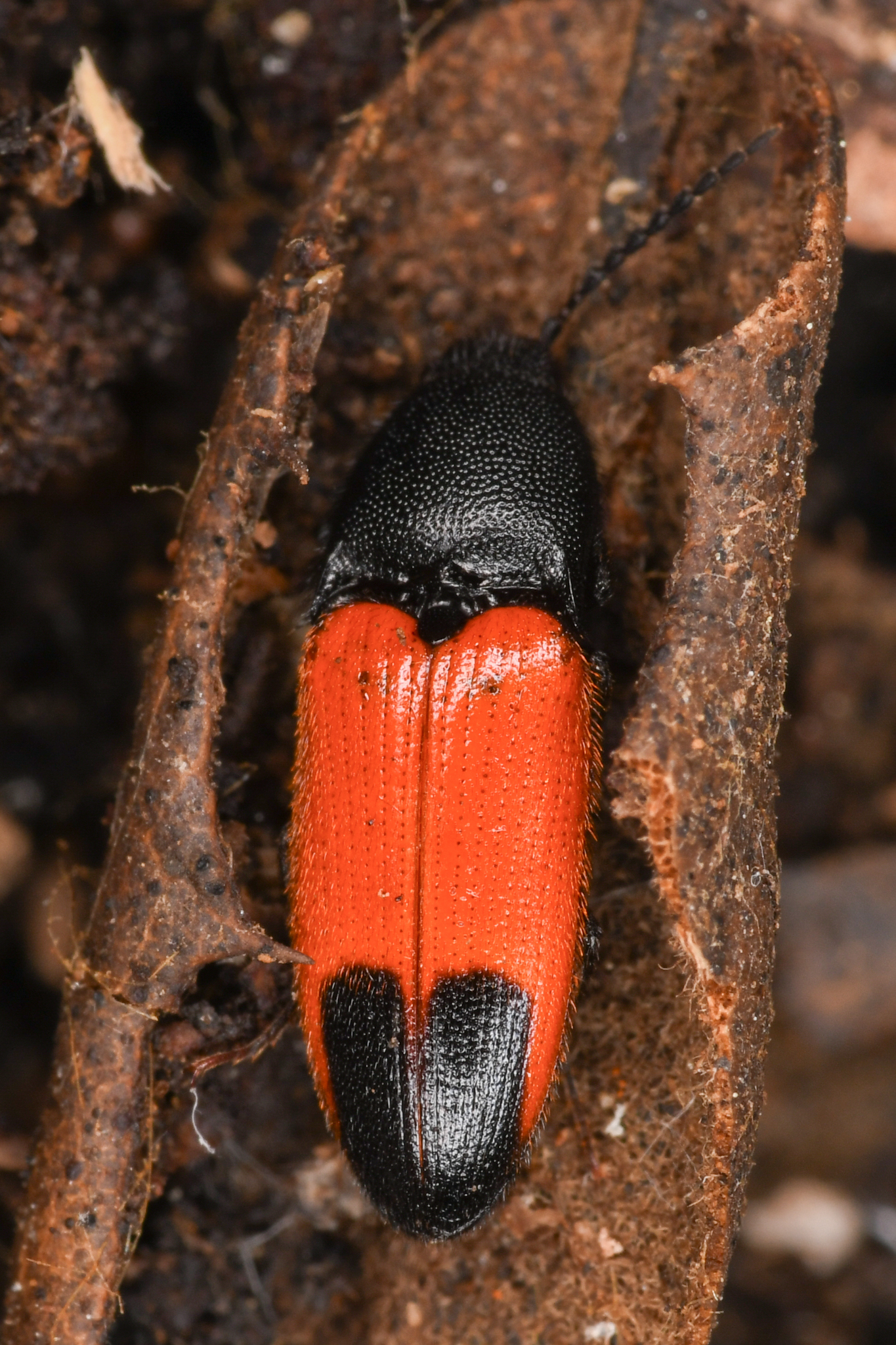

Scientific classification
- Domain: Eukaryota
- Kingdom: Animalia
- Phylum: Arthropoda
- Class: Insecta
- Order: Coleoptera
- Suborder: Polyphaga
- Infraorder: Elateriformia
- Family: Elateridae
- Genus: Ampedus
- Species: A. cordifer

Binomial name
- Ampedus cordifer LeConte, 1859

= Ampedus cordifer =

Species of beetle

Ampedus cordifer is a species of click beetle native to western North America. Adults have a bright orange elytra with a black patch that looks roughly like a heart. They are most likely to be observed from May through July.
