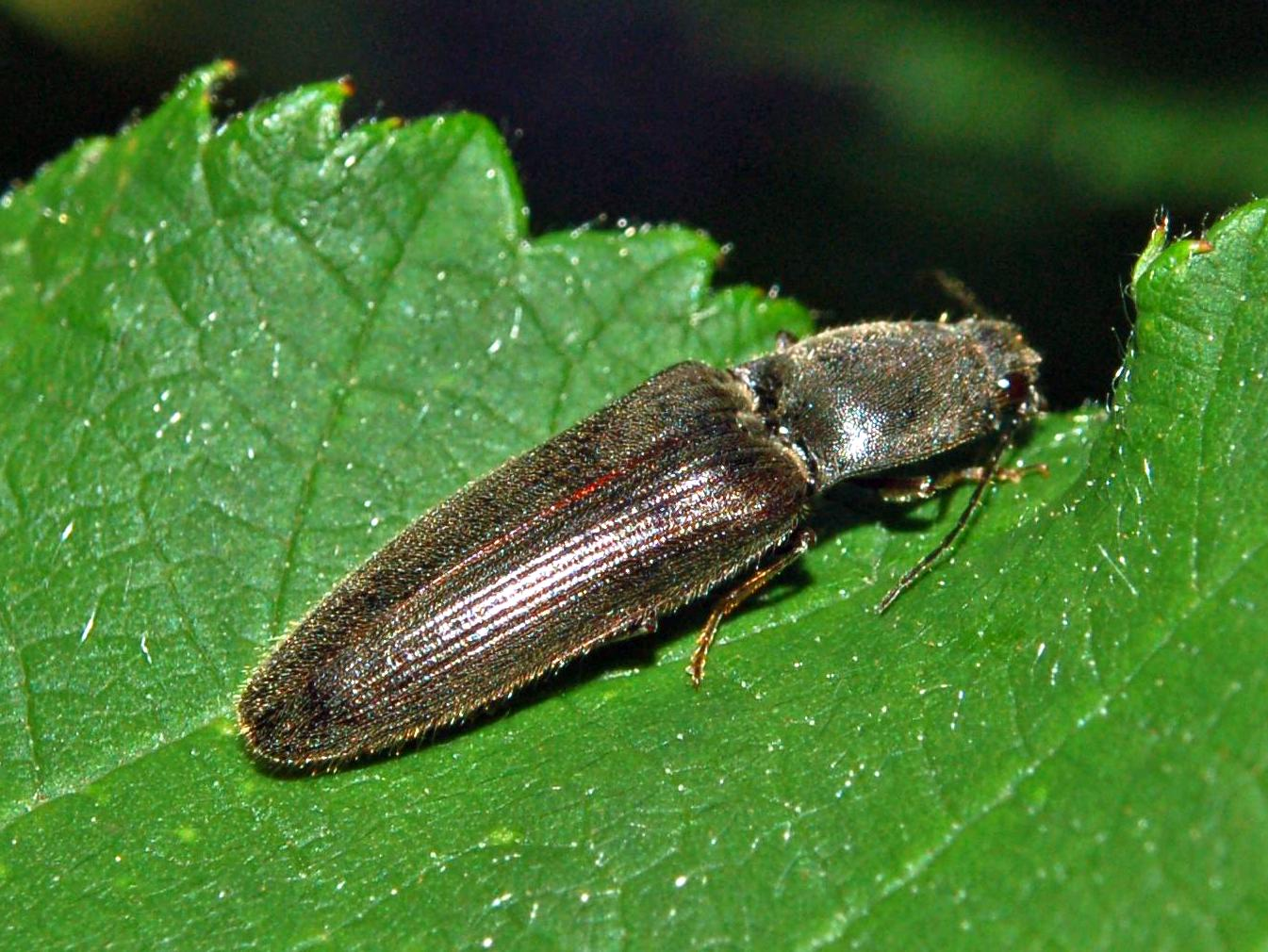
- Athous haemorrhoidalis

Scientific classification
- Domain: Eukaryota
- Kingdom: Animalia
- Phylum: Arthropoda
- Class: Insecta
- Order: Coleoptera
- Suborder: Polyphaga
- Infraorder: Elateriformia
- Family: Elateridae
- Subfamily: Dendrometrinae
- Genus: Athous; Eschscholtz, 1829

= Athous =

Genus of beetles

Athous is a genus of click beetles belonging to the family Elateridae.

== Species ==
- Athous abdurachmanovi Dolin in Dolin & Penev, 2004
- Athous acanthus (Say, 1839)
- Athous acutangulus Fairmaire, 1866
- Athous agriotoides Fall, 1907
- Athous albanicus Csiki, 1940
- Athous alnicola Gistel, 1857
- Athous alpestris Orlov, 1994
- Athous alticola Platia, 2006
- Athous anatolicus Platia, 1989
- Athous angulifrons Reitter, 1905
- Athous apfelbecki Reitter, 1905
- Athous appalachius Van Dyke, 1932
- Athous arizonicus Van Dyke, 1932
- Athous artvinensis Platia, Yildirim & Kesdek, 2007
- Athous astrabadensis Faust, 1877
- Athous asturiensis Platia, 2006
- Athous aterrimus Fall, 1910
- Athous audisioi Guglielmi & Platia, 1985
- Athous austriacus Desbrochers des Loges, 1873
- Athous axillaris Horn, 1871
- Athous azoricus Platia & Gudenzi, 2002
- Athous balcanicus Reitter, 1905
- Athous barriesi Platia & Gudenzi, 1996
- Athous barthei Leseigneur, 1958
- Athous bedeli Fleutiaux, 1928
- Athous belloi Guglielmi & Platia, 1985
- Athous benedikti Platia, 2003
- Athous bicolor (Goeze, 1777)
- Athous binaghii Platia, 1984
- Athous birmanicus Fleutiaux, 1942
- Athous bolivari Reitter, 1904
- Athous bolognai Guglielmi & Platia, 1985
- Athous brachati Zeising & Brunne, 2005
- Athous brevicornis Desbrochers des Loges, 1871
- Athous brevipennis Schwarz, 1897
- Athous brevis Fleutiaus, 1928
- Athous brightwelli (Kirby, 1837)
- Athous bulgaricus Platia, 2001
- Athous cachecticus Candèze, 1860
- Athous campyloides Newman, 1833
- Athous cantabricus Schaufuss, 1862
- Athous canus Dufour, 1843
- Athous carpathicus Reitter, 1905
- Athous carpathophilus Reitter, 1905
- Athous catalonicus Platia, 2006
- Athous cavazzutii Platia, 2003
- Athous caviformis Reitter, 1905
- Athous cavifrons L. Redtenbacher, 1858
- Athous cavulus Reitter, 1905
- Athous cavus (Germar, 1817)
- Athous cervicolor Heyden, 1880
- Athous chamboveti Mulsant & Godart, 1868
- Athous chapaensis Fleutiaux, 1928
- Athous cingulatus L. Miller, 1881
- Athous circassicus Reitter, 1888
- Athous circassiensis Reitter, 1905
- Athous circumductus (Ménétriés, 1832)
- Athous codinai Platia, 2006
- Athous conradi Platia, 2006
- Athous coomani Fleutiaux, 1928
- Athous coquerelli Reitter, 1908
- Athous corcyreus Reitter, 1905
- Athous corsicus Reiche, 1861
- Athous crassicornis Candèze, 1860
- Athous cribratus LeConte, 1876
- Athous croaticus Platia & Gudenzi, 2002
- Athous csikii Platia, 2001
- Athous cucullatus (Say, 1825)
- Athous curtulus Desbrochers des Loges, 1873
- Athous curtus Dolin in Dolin & Penev, 2004
- Athous daccordii Guglielmi & Platia, 1985
- Athous daghestanicus Reitter, 1890
- Athous dalmatinus Platia, 2005
- Athous dasycerus Buysson, 1890
- Athous debilis Reiche, 1869
- Athous dejeanii (Laporte, 1840)
- Athous delmastroi Platia & Gudenzi, 1998
- Athous demangei Fleutiaux, 1918
- Athous demirsoyi Platia, Kabalak & Sert, 2007
- Athous densatus Reitter, 1905
- Athous desbrochersi Platia, 2006
- Athous difficilis (Dufour, 1843)
- Athous dilaticornis Reitter, 1905
- Athous dimidiatus Gistel, 1857
- Athous diplogrammus Orlov, 1994
- Athous discrepans Reitter, 1908
- Athous distinctithorax Desbrochers des Loges, 1873
- Athous divaricatus Platia, 2006
- Athous dorgaliensis Buysson, 1912
- Athous durazzoi Platia, 1985
- Athous dusaneki Platia, 2003
- Athous ebeninus Fleutiaux, 1918
- Athous eckerleini Platia & Gudenzi, 2000
- Athous edirnensis Platia & Gudenzi, 2000
- Athous emaciatus Candèze, 1860
- Athous epirus Stierlin, 1875
- Athous equestris (LeConte, 1853)
- Athous escolai Platia, 2006
- Athous espanoli Platia, 2006
- Athous espinamensis Platia, 2006
- Athous essigi Van Dyke, 1932
- Athous euxinus Buysson, 1912
- Athous excavatus (Motschulsky, 1859)
- Athous farallonicus Van Dyke, 1951
- Athous fausti Reitter, 1890
- Athous filicornis (Dufour, 1851)
- Athous flavipennis Candèze, 1860
- Athous fossularis (LeConte, 1853)
- Athous fragariae Platia & Kovanci, 2005
- Athous francoisi Fleutiaux, 1928
- Athous freudei Platia, 1989
- Athous frigidus Mulsant & Guillebeau, 1855
- Athous frontalis Platia & Schimmel, 1991
- Athous fueguensis Golbach & Aranda, 1991
- Athous fuentei Platia, 2006
- Athous funestus Champion, 1896
- Athous gagliardii Platia, 1988
- Athous galiberti Buysson, 1918
- Athous gallicus Platia & Gudenzi, 2000
- Athous ganglbaueri Schwarz, 1897
- Athous gerezianus Reitter, 1905
- Athous gianassoi Platia & Gudenzi, 1996
- Athous giustoi Platia, 2006
- Athous gobanzi Reitter, 1905
- Athous godarti Mulsant & Guillebeau, 1853
- Athous gonzalesi Platia, 2006
- Athous goriciensis Reitter, 1905
- Athous gottwaldi Lohse, 1978
- Athous gracacensis Platia, 2005
- Athous graecus Platia, 1989
- Athous guadalupensis Platia, 2006
- Athous gudenzii Guglielmi & Platia, 1985
- Athous haemorrhoidalis (Fabricius, 1801)
- Athous hajeki Platia & Gudenzi, 2005
- Athous harmodius Reitter, 1905
- Athous herbigradus Mulsant & Guillebeau, 1855
- Athous hetzeli Platia, 2004
- Athous hilfi Reitter, 1912
- Athous holtzi Reitter, 1905
- Athous humeralis (Fischer von Waldheim, 1824)
- Athous iablokoffi Leseigneur, 1972
- Athous ibericus Platia, 2006
- Athous imitans Fall, 1910
- Athous incognitus Platia, 1988
- Athous ineptus Candèze, 1860
- Athous insularis Desbrochers des Loges, 1869
- Athous iranicus Platia, 2004
- Athous iristonicus Dolin, 1971
- Athous jejunus Kiesenwetter, 1858
- Athous judicariensis Schwarz, 1900
- Athous kasovskyi Platia & Gudenzi, 2007
- Athous kaszabi Dolin, 1986
- Athous kerkyranus Reitter, 1905
- Athous kobachidzei Dolin & Chantladze, 1982
- Athous korabicus Csiki, 1940
- Athous kovancii Platia, 2003
- Athous kruegeri Reitter, 1905
- Athous kubani Schimmel, 1998
- Athous laevistriatus (Dufour, 1851)
- Athous lambeleti Leseigneur, 2004
- Athous lassallei Platia & Gudenzi, 1996
- Athous latior Orlov, 1994
- Athous lecontei (Candèze, 1889)
- Athous leonhardi Reitter, 1905
- Athous lepontinus Schwarz, 1900
- Athous leprieuri Desbrochers des Loges, 1870
- Athous leseigneuri Platia, 2006
- Athous lgockii Dolin, 1983
- Athous limbatus LeConte, 1866
- Athous limoniiformis Candèze, 1865
- Athous lomnickii Reitter, 1905
- Athous longicornis Candèze, 1865
- Athous luigionii Platia, 1988
- Athous lusitanus Platia, 2006
- Athous magnanii Guglielmi & Platia, 1985
- Athous malaisei Fleutiaux, 1942
- Athous malkinorum Platia, 2006
- Athous malmusii Platia & Gudenzi, 2000
- Athous mandibularis (Dufour, 1843)
- Athous margheritae Guglielmi & Platia, 1985
- Athous marginicollis Reitter, 1890
- Athous massiei Fleutiaux, 1928
- Athous melanoderes Mulsant & Guillebeau, 1855
- Athous melonii Platia, 1984
- Athous mendesi Giuseppe & Serrano, 2002
- Athous mertliki Platia & Gudenzi, 2002
- Athous meuseli Reitter, 1905
- Athous mingrelicus Reitter, 1890
- Athous minutus Fleutiaux, 1928
- Athous mokrzeckii Lomnicki, 1923
- Athous mollis Reitter, 1889
- Athous monguzzii Platia & Gudenzi, 2007
- Athous monilicornis Schwarz, 1897
- Athous nadari Buysson, 1904
- Athous nadoraz Mertlik & Dusanek, 2006
- Athous naseri J. Müller, 1916
- Athous neacanthus Becker, 1974
- Athous nigropilis Motschulsky, 1859
- Athous nigror Platia, 2006
- Athous nodieri Fleutiaux, 1918
- Athous novaki Penecke, 1907
- Athous obsoletus (Illiger, 1807)
- Athous olbiensis Mulsant & Guillebeau, 1856
- Athous olcesei Buysson, 1905
- Athous olgae Iablokov-Khnzorian, 1961
- Athous opacus Fleutiaux, 1934
- Athous opilinus Candèze, 1860
- Athous ornatipennis (LeConte, 1863)
- Athous oromii Platia & Gudenzi, 2005
- Athous orvus Becker, 1974
- Athous osellai Guglielmi & Platia, 1985
- Athous pacei Guglielmi & Platia, 1985
- Athous paflagonensis Platia & Gudenzi, 1998
- Athous paganettii Platia, 2006
- Athous pallidus Platia & Gudenzi, 2002
- Athous panellai Platia & Schimmel, 1991
- Athous paradisus Knull, 1934
- Athous parallelopipedus Brullé, 1832
- Athous patoni Dolin in Dolin & Penev, 2004
- Athous pedemontanus Platia, 1988
- Athous penevi Platia, 2001
- Athous perezarcasi Platia, 2006
- Athous perroti Fleutiaux, 1940
- Athous pfefferi Roubal, 1932
- Athous phylander Tottenham, 1948
- Athous picipennis Reitter, 1905
- Athous plagipennis Reitter, 1905
- Athous polygenus (Fall, 1910)
- Athous pomboi Platia & Borges, 2003
- Athous ponticus Platia & Gudenzi, 2007
- Athous posticus (Melsheimer, 1844)
- Athous productus (Randall, 1838)
- Athous propinquus Buysson, 1890
- Athous protoracicus Platia & Schimmel, 1991
- Athous prouzai Platia, 2005
- Athous proximus Hampe, 1864
- Athous putativus Platia, 2006
- Athous putschkovi Dolin & Penev, 2004
- Athous pyrenaeus Candèze, 1865
- Athous reflexicollis Dolin & Penev, 2004
- Athous reitteri Platia, 2006
- Athous reynosae C. N. F. Brisout de Barneville, 1866
- Athous roralis Gistel, 1857
- Athous rosinae Reitter, 1899
- Athous ruffoi Guglielmi & Platia, 1985
- Athous rufifrons (Randall, 1838)
- Athous rufipennis Van Dyke, 1932
- Athous rufithorax Miwa, 1930
- Athous rufotestaceous Fall, 1907
- Athous ruteri Chassain, 1985
- Athous sabatinellii Guglielmi & Platia, 1985
- Athous sacheri Kiesenwetter, 1858
- Athous samai Guglielmi & Platia, 1985
- Athous sameki Platia, 2003
- Athous sanguinicollis Frivaldsky, 1892
- Athous scapularis (Say, 1839)
- Athous scissus LeConte, 1857
- Athous senaci Buysson, 1890
- Athous serbicus Reitter, 1905
- Athous serranoi Platia, 2006
- Athous settei Guglielmi & Platia, 1985
- Athous shirozui Ôhira, 1966
- Athous silicensis Laibner, 1975
- Athous singularis Reitter, 1905
- Athous sinuatocollis Desbrochers des Loges, 1869
- Athous siteki Platia, 2006
- Athous snizeki Platia, 2004
- Athous sosybius Reitter, 1905
- Athous spalatrensis Reitter, 1894
- Athous stoimenovae Platia, 2001
- Athous striatus Fleutiaux, 1940
- Athous strictus (Fischer von Waldheim, 1824)
- Athous subfuscus (Müller, 1767)
- Athous subtruncatoides Platia, 2006
- Athous subtruncatus Mulsant & Guillebeau, 1856
- Athous subvirgatus Daniel, 1904
- Athous svihlai Platia & Gudenzi, 1998
- Athous szombathyi Schenkling, 1927
- Athous talamellii Platia & Gudenzi, 1998
- Athous tattakensis (Miwa, 1928)
- Athous tattakensis Miwa, 1928
- Athous tauricola Reitter, 1905
- Athous tauricus Candèze, 1860
- Athous tekkirazicus Platia, 2003
- Athous temperatus Miwa, 1930
- Athous tomentosus Mulsant & Guillebeau, 1855
- Athous transylvanicus Platia, 2001
- Athous tribertii Guglielmi & Platia, 1985
- Athous tschukini Reitter, 1910
- Athous turcicus Reitter, 1905
- Athous uncicollis Perris, 1864
- Athous utschderensis Reitter, 1890
- Athous vanmeeri Chassain, 2007
- Athous vasconicus Platia, 2006
- Athous vavrai Platia, 2006
- Athous vicinus Desbrochers des Loges, 1873
- Athous villardi Carret, 1904
- Athous villiger Mulsant & Guillebeau, 1855
- Athous villosulus Desbrochers des Loges, 1875
- Athous vitalisi Fleutiaux, 1918
- Athous vittatoides Reitter, 1905
- Athous vittatus (Fabricius, 1792)
- Athous vittiger LeConte, 1853
- Athous vivesi Platia & Gudenzi, 2005
- Athous vomeroi Platia, 1988
- Athous warchalowskii Platia & Tarnawski, 1998
- Athous weigeli Schimmel, 1998
- Athous wewalkai Platia, 1989
- Athous zanettii Guglielmi & Platia, 1985
- Athous zappiorum Platia, 1985
- Athous zbuzeki Platia & Gudenzi, 2007
- Athous zebei Bach, 1852
- Athous ziegleri Zeising & Brunne, 2005
