= Athous curtulus =

Scientific classification
- Kingdom: Animalia
- Phylum: Arthropoda
- Class: Insecta
- Order: Coleoptera
- Suborder: Polyphaga
- Infraorder: Elateriformia
- Family: Elateridae
- Genus: Athous
- Species: A. curtulus

Binomial name
- Athous curtulus Desbrochers des Loges, 1873

Species of beetle

Athous curtulus is a species of click beetle from the family Elateridae endemic to Spain.
