= Athous caviformis =

Scientific classification
- Kingdom: Animalia
- Phylum: Arthropoda
- Class: Insecta
- Order: Coleoptera
- Suborder: Polyphaga
- Infraorder: Elateriformia
- Family: Elateridae
- Genus: Athous
- Species: A. caviformis

Binomial name
- Athous caviformis Reitter, 1905

Species of beetle

Athous caviformis is a species of brown-coloured click beetles which can be found in Hungary, Croatia, and Bosnia and Herzegovina.
