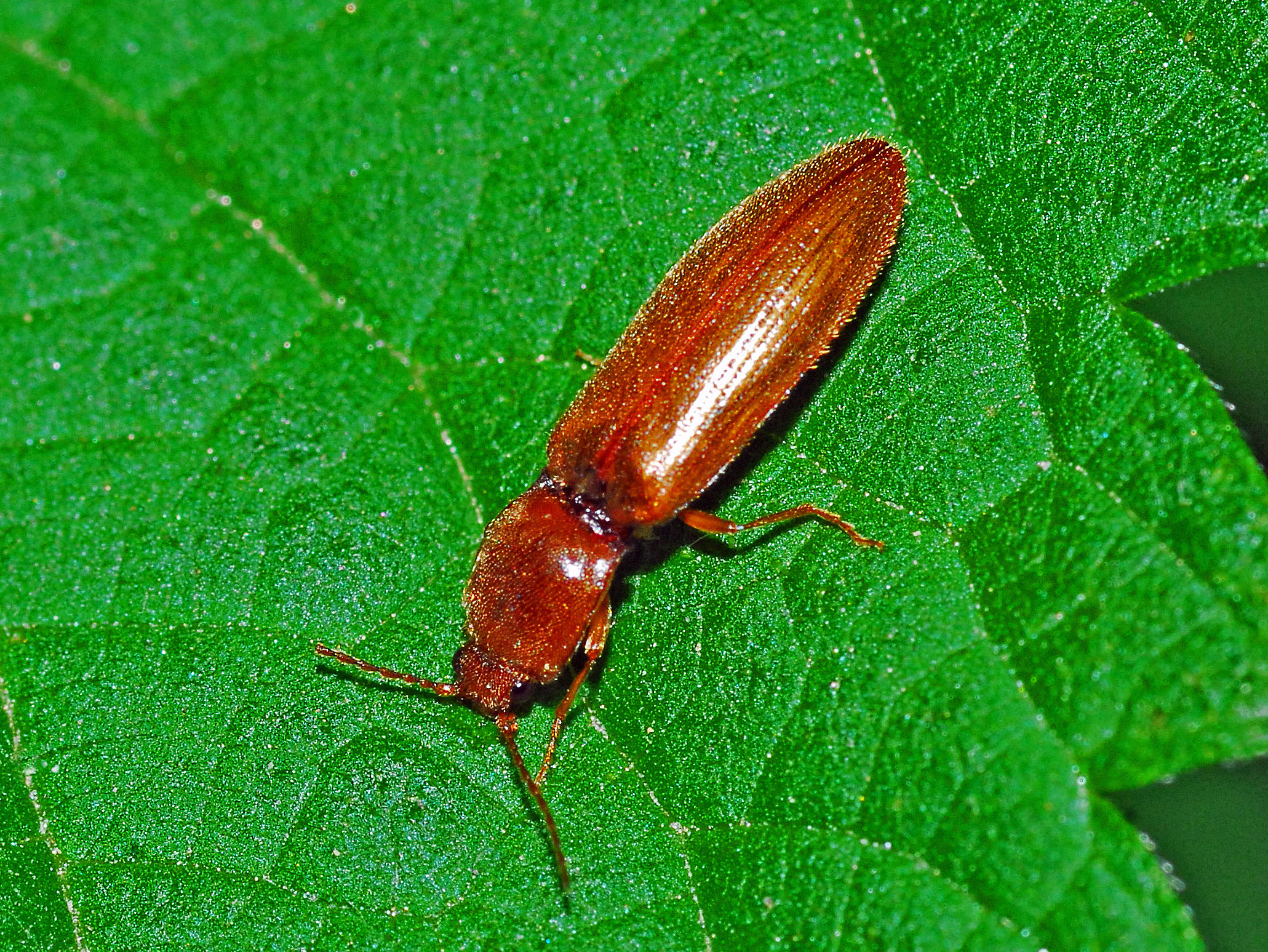
- Female

Scientific classification
- Domain: Eukaryota
- Kingdom: Animalia
- Phylum: Arthropoda
- Class: Insecta
- Order: Coleoptera
- Suborder: Polyphaga
- Infraorder: Elateriformia
- Family: Elateridae
- Genus: Athous
- Species: A. emaciatus

Binomial name
- Athous emaciatus Candèze, 1860

= Athous emaciatus =

Species of beetle

Athous emaciatus is a species of click beetle in the genus Athous.

== Distribution ==
This species is present in Europe (France, northern Italy, and Switzerland).

== Habitat ==
The adults can be found on trees and shrubs in cool woodland areas. The larva is most likely host to stumps of Pinus uncinata.

== Description ==
Athous emaciatus can reach a body length of about 8.5–10.5 mm (0.33–0.41 in). Colour of the body is always pale, straw yellow tinged with ferruginous. Often the disc of the pronotum is darkened.
