= Athous utschderensis =

Scientific classification
- Kingdom: Animalia
- Phylum: Arthropoda
- Class: Insecta
- Order: Coleoptera
- Suborder: Polyphaga
- Infraorder: Elateriformia
- Family: Elateridae
- Genus: Athous
- Species: A. utschderensis

Binomial name
- Athous utschderensis Reitter, 1905

Synonyms
- Athous kovali Orlov, 1994

Species of beetle

Athous utschderensis is a species of click beetle from the family Elateridae found in Russian cities such as Novorossiysk, Sochi and Krasnodar, as well as the southwestern Caucasus.
