= Athous axillaris =

Scientific classification
- Domain: Eukaryota
- Kingdom: Animalia
- Phylum: Arthropoda
- Class: Insecta
- Order: Coleoptera
- Suborder: Polyphaga
- Infraorder: Elateriformia
- Family: Elateridae
- Genus: Athous
- Species: A. axillaris

Binomial name
- Athous axillaris Horn, 1871

Species of beetle

Athous axillaris is a species of click beetle from the family Elateridae. It was described by George Henry Horn in 1871 and is endemic to California.

== Description ==
Athous axillaris is 9.4–12.9 millimetres (0.37–0.51 in) long, dark brown to black in colour, and has a muddy orange coloured head and pronotum.
