= Athous balcanicus =

Scientific classification
- Kingdom: Animalia
- Phylum: Arthropoda
- Class: Insecta
- Order: Coleoptera
- Suborder: Polyphaga
- Infraorder: Elateriformia
- Family: Elateridae
- Genus: Athous
- Species: A. balcanicus

Binomial name
- Athous balcanicus Reitter, 1905

Species of beetle

Athous balcanicus is a species of click beetle from the family Elateridae endemic to Bulgaria. The species is 9 millimetres (0.35 in) long.
