= Athous sosybius =

Scientific classification
- Kingdom: Animalia
- Phylum: Arthropoda
- Class: Insecta
- Order: Coleoptera
- Suborder: Polyphaga
- Infraorder: Elateriformia
- Family: Elateridae
- Genus: Athous
- Species: A. sosybius

Binomial name
- Athous sosybius Reitter, 1905

Species of beetle

Athous sosybius is a species of click beetle (family Elateridae) which is endemic to Dagestan.
