= Athous apfelbecki =

Scientific classification
- Kingdom: Animalia
- Phylum: Arthropoda
- Class: Insecta
- Order: Coleoptera
- Suborder: Polyphaga
- Infraorder: Elateriformia
- Family: Elateridae
- Genus: Athous
- Species: A. apfelbecki

Binomial name
- Athous apfelbecki Reitter, 1905

Species of beetle

Athous apfelbecki is a species of click beetle from the family Elateridae. The species is found in the Balkans, including, Bulgaria, Hungary, Romania, and former Yugoslavian states. The species is 9–12 millimetres (0.35–0.47 in) long.
