= Athous alpestris =

Scientific classification
- Domain: Eukaryota
- Kingdom: Animalia
- Phylum: Arthropoda
- Class: Insecta
- Order: Coleoptera
- Suborder: Polyphaga
- Infraorder: Elateriformia
- Family: Elateridae
- Genus: Athous
- Species: A. alpestris

Binomial name
- Athous alpestris Orlov, 1994

Species of beetle

Athous alpestris is a species of click beetle of the family Elateridae found at elevations of 1,800–2,400 metres (5,900–7,900 ft) in the mountains of Karachay-Cherkessia.
