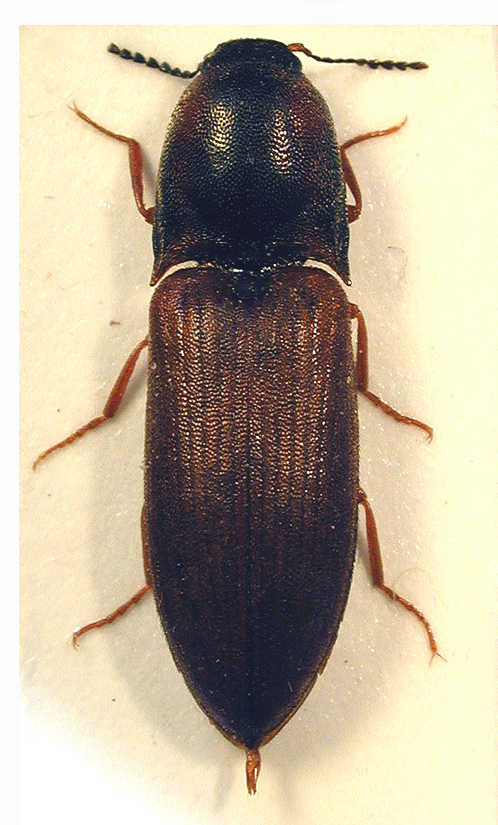
- Sericus brunneus

Scientific classification
- Kingdom: Animalia
- Phylum: Arthropoda
- Class: Insecta
- Order: Coleoptera
- Suborder: Polyphaga
- Infraorder: Elateriformia
- Family: Elateridae
- Genus: Sericus; Eschscholtz, 1829

= Sericus =

Genus of beetles

Sericus is a genus of beetles belonging to the family Elateridae.

The species of this genus are found in Eurasia and Northern America.

Species:

- Sericus bifoveolatus
- Sericus brunneus (Linnaeus, 1758)
