= Athous latior =

Scientific classification
- Domain: Eukaryota
- Kingdom: Animalia
- Phylum: Arthropoda
- Class: Insecta
- Order: Coleoptera
- Suborder: Polyphaga
- Infraorder: Elateriformia
- Family: Elateridae
- Genus: Athous
- Species: A. latior

Binomial name
- Athous latior Orlov, 1994

Species of beetle

Athous latior is a species of click beetle of the family Elateridae found in the Western Caucasus, on Laba River in Krasnodar, and Karachay-Cherkessia.
