= Athous turcicus =

Scientific classification
- Kingdom: Animalia
- Phylum: Arthropoda
- Clade: Pancrustacea
- Class: Insecta
- Order: Coleoptera
- Suborder: Polyphaga
- Infraorder: Elateriformia
- Family: Elateridae
- Genus: Athous
- Species: A. turcicus

Binomial name
- Athous turcicus Reitter, 1905

Species of beetle

Athous turcicus is a species of brown-coloured click beetle of the family Elateridae known from North Macedonia and Greece. It is 13 millimetres (0.51 in) long.
