= Athous angulifrons =

Scientific classification
- Kingdom: Animalia
- Phylum: Arthropoda
- Clade: Pancrustacea
- Class: Insecta
- Order: Coleoptera
- Suborder: Polyphaga
- Infraorder: Elateriformia
- Family: Elateridae
- Genus: Athous
- Species: A. angulifrons

Binomial name
- Athous angulifrons Reitter, 1905

Species of beetle

Athous angulifrons is a species of click beetle from the family Elateridae endemic to Kamnik–Savinja Alps of Slovenia. The species is 9–12 millimetres (0.35–0.47 in) long and is yellowish-green in colour.
