= Athous iristonicus =

Scientific classification
- Kingdom: Animalia
- Phylum: Arthropoda
- Class: Insecta
- Order: Coleoptera
- Suborder: Polyphaga
- Infraorder: Elateriformia
- Family: Elateridae
- Genus: Athous
- Species: A. iristonicus

Binomial name
- Athous iristonicus Dolin, 1971

Species of beetle

Athous iristonicus is a species of click beetle from the family Elateridae found in central Caucasian states such as Chechnya, Ingushetia, Kabardino-Balkaria, and North Ossetia–Alania.
