= Athous dasycerus =

Scientific classification
- Domain: Eukaryota
- Kingdom: Animalia
- Phylum: Arthropoda
- Class: Insecta
- Order: Coleoptera
- Suborder: Polyphaga
- Infraorder: Elateriformia
- Family: Elateridae
- Genus: Athous
- Species: A. dasycerus

Binomial name
- Athous dasycerus Buysson, 1890

Species of beetle

Athous dasycerus is a species of click beetle of the family Elateridae. It is 11 millimetres (0.43 in) long and is brown coloured.
