= Athous curtus =

Scientific classification
- Domain: Eukaryota
- Kingdom: Animalia
- Phylum: Arthropoda
- Class: Insecta
- Order: Coleoptera
- Suborder: Polyphaga
- Infraorder: Elateriformia
- Family: Elateridae
- Genus: Athous
- Species: A. curtus

Binomial name
- Athous curtus W. Dolin, 1977

Species of beetle

Athous curtus is a species of click beetle of the family Elateridae endemic to the Western Caucasus.

== Description ==
The body is oval shaped and is 9 millimetres (0.35 in) long and 3 millimetres (0.12 in) wide. The species is yellowish-brown in colour with tight top and bottom and golden hair. Its head is almost flat and is punctured. The distance between the body and the head is 5-1 long. The tips of the rear angle of the prothorax and its sensor are short. The prothorax itself is cushion-like, almost square shaped and is punctured just like the head. The margins are almost parallel and are located at the rear angle. The angles themselves are short and rounded closer to the eye. The species' prothorax is dense and punctured just like its pronotum, while its scutellum is almost oval-shaped and is long and wide. Its elytron is also oval, stretched, and is 2.6 times the length of the pronotum, while the middle of the elytra is 2 times longer and wider. The species' longitudinal strips are deep with points that look like strips and are wider than the strips. Its convex is almost flat and is densely punctured while the covering of the hind legs is narrow.
