= Athous austriacus =

Scientific classification
- Domain: Eukaryota
- Kingdom: Animalia
- Phylum: Arthropoda
- Class: Insecta
- Order: Coleoptera
- Suborder: Polyphaga
- Infraorder: Elateriformia
- Family: Elateridae
- Genus: Athous
- Species: A. austriacus

Binomial name
- Athous austriacus Desbrochers des Loges, 1873

Species of beetle

Athous austriacus is a species of brown-coloured click beetle from the family Elateridae. The species is 10.5 millimetres (0.41 in) long and is found in Hochschwab, Austria.
