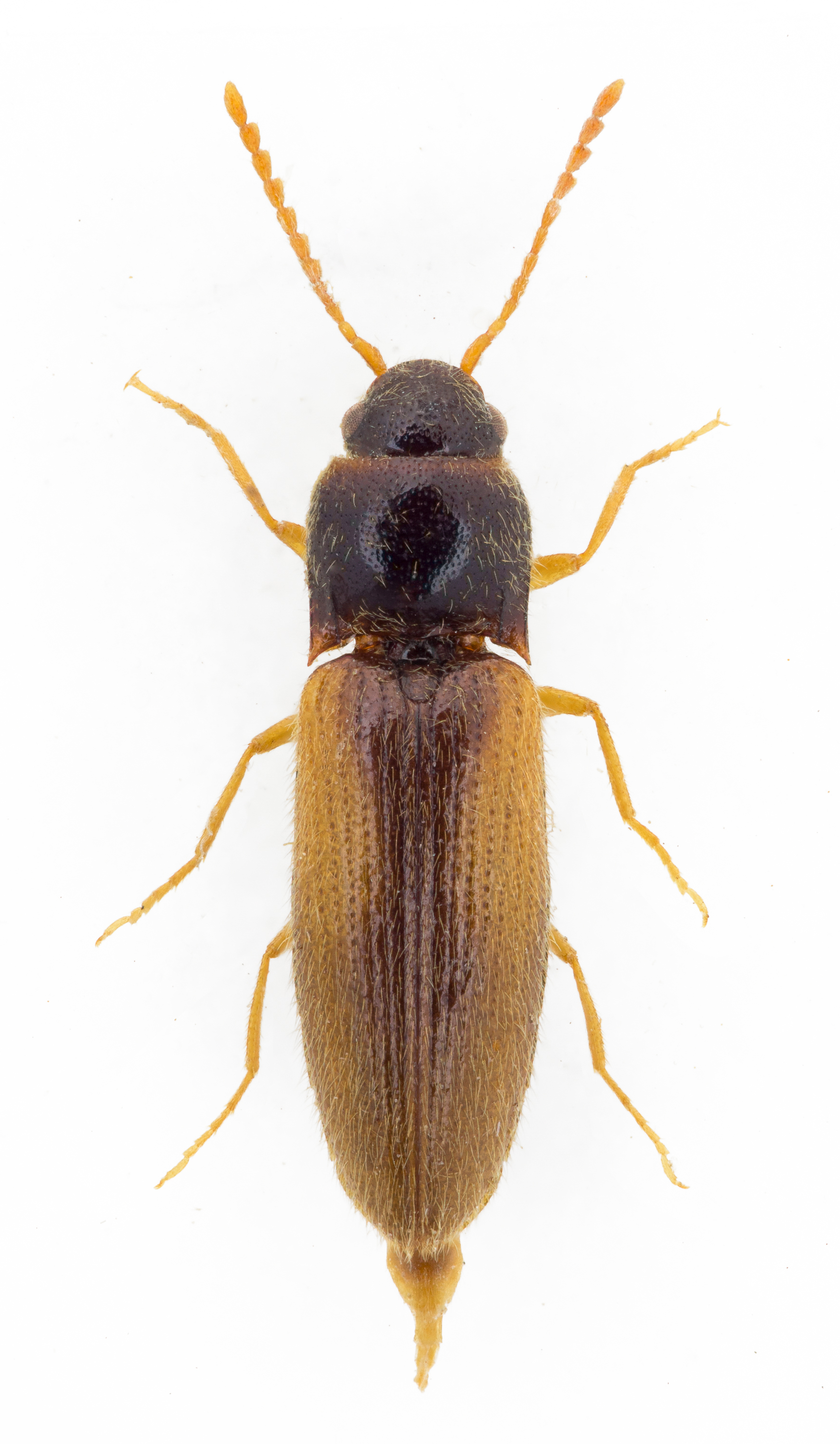

Scientific classification
- Kingdom: Animalia
- Phylum: Arthropoda
- Clade: Pancrustacea
- Class: Insecta
- Order: Coleoptera
- Suborder: Polyphaga
- Infraorder: Elateriformia
- Family: Elateridae
- Genus: Adrastus
- Species: A. pallens

Binomial name
- Adrastus pallens (Fabricius, 1792)

= Adrastus pallens =

Species of beetle

Adrastus pallens is a species of click beetles native to Europe.
