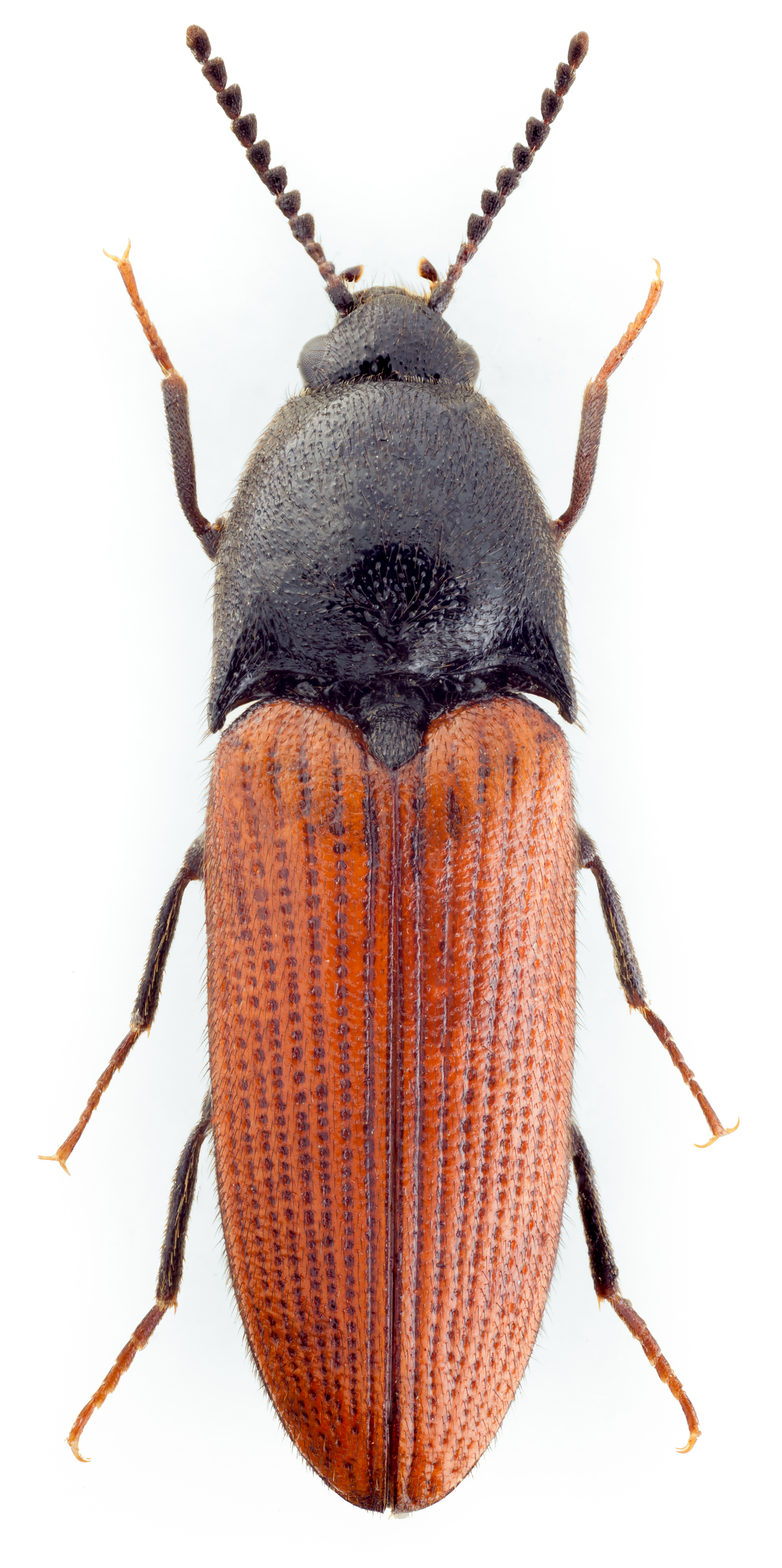

Scientific classification
- Kingdom: Animalia
- Phylum: Arthropoda
- Class: Insecta
- Order: Coleoptera
- Suborder: Polyphaga
- Infraorder: Elateriformia
- Family: Elateridae
- Genus: Ampedus
- Species: A. pomonae

Binomial name
- Ampedus pomonae Stephens, 1830

= Ampedus pomonae =

Species of beetle

Ampedus pomonae is a species of click beetles native to Europe.
