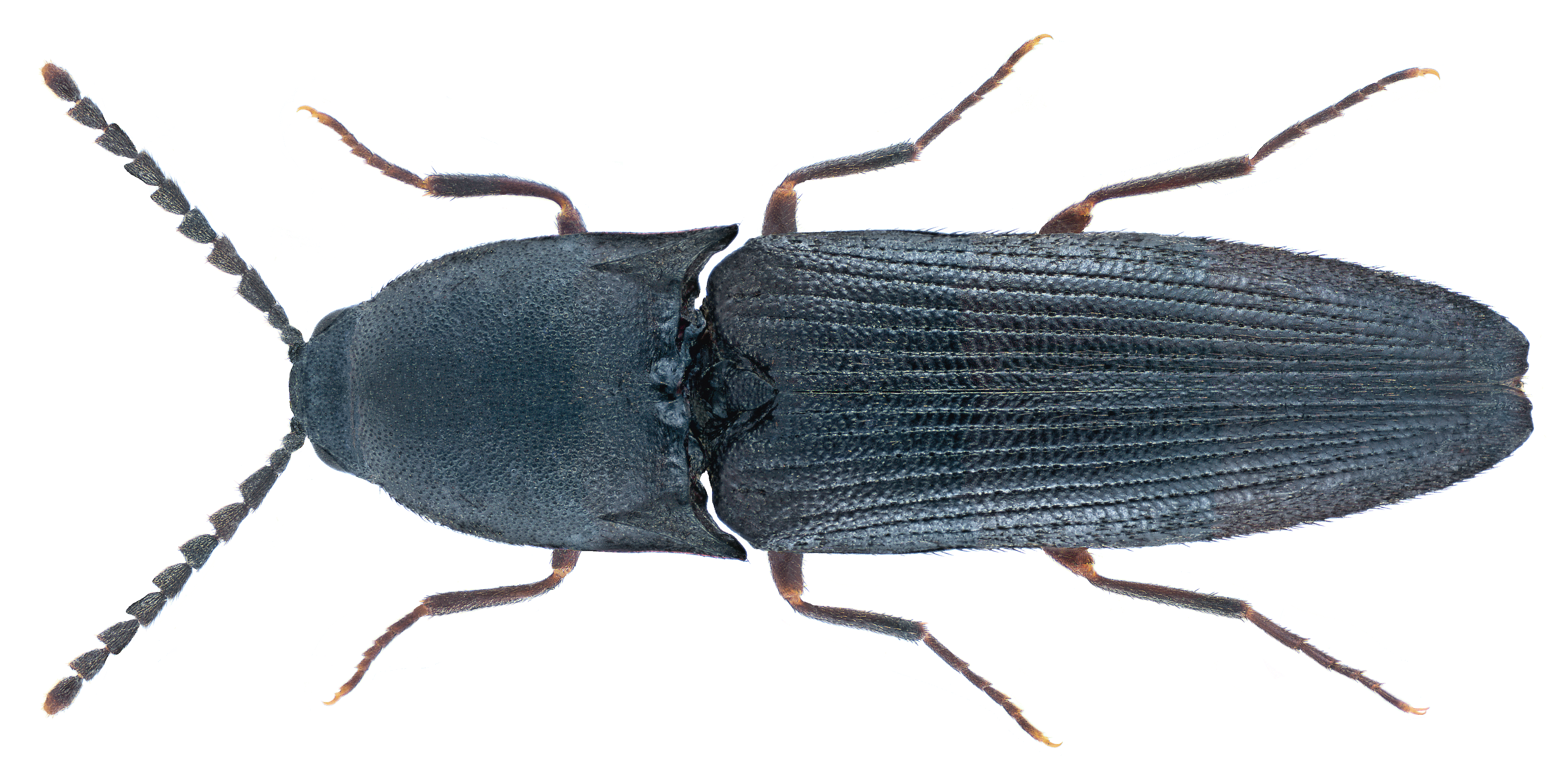

Scientific classification
- Kingdom: Animalia
- Phylum: Arthropoda
- Class: Insecta
- Order: Coleoptera
- Suborder: Polyphaga
- Infraorder: Elateriformia
- Family: Elateridae
- Subfamily: Elaterinae
- Genus: Megapenthes
- Species: M. lugens

Binomial name
- Megapenthes lugens (Redtenbacher, 1842)

Synonyms
- Elater lugens L.Redtenbacher, 1842; Sericosomus lugens W.Redtenbacher, 1842

= Megapenthes lugens =

Species of beetle

Megapenthes lugens is a species of primarily European click beetle. The adult is black, narrow and 7–10 mm (0.28–0.39 in) long. The larvae feed on weevil larvae in the decaying trunks of beech and elm. In July 2010, the common name "queen's executioner beetle" was proposed following a competition.

== Description ==
Adults of Megapenthes lugens grow to a length of 7–10 millimetres (0.28–0.39 in), with a broad pronotum (the dorsal sclerites of the anterior segment of the thorax). The beetle's antennae extend marginally beyond the posterior of the pronotum when laid across the dorsal sclerites. The whole beetle is black in colour. The elytra gradually taper, and bear pronounced longitudinal rows of scored markings.

== Ecology ==
Megapenthes lugens, whilst in larval form, is associated with hollow, decaying trunks of beech and elm trees. It is believed that they feed on the larvae of other beetles. The beetle is understood to be omnivorous; its larvae preying on the larvae of weevils of the subfamily Cossoninae, whilst imagines consume nectar from a wide range of flowers. Pupation occurs in the autumn, and the resulting imago overwinters within the pupal case, emerging in the spring.

== Distribution ==
Megapenthes lugens has a wide distribution across Europe, extending into the Caucasus and North Africa.

The species is endangered in the United Kingdom, where it is believed to be restricted to Windsor Great Park. Older records show it was also found in Epping Forest and the New Forest, with 19th-century records for Surrey, Norfolk and Middlesex. Additional, isolated records document a presence in Gloucestershire and Hampshire.

== Common name ==
On 21 June 2010, The Guardian, in collaboration with Natural England and the Oxford University Museum of Natural History, launched a competition by which the general public would be asked to construct common names reflecting the appearance, natural history and location – including humour or cultural references where applicable – of ten British species previously known uniquely by their Latin names. This competition was to mark the 2010 International Year of Biodiversity, and originated from an article in the Comment is Free section of the Guardian website guardian.co.uk, published on 15 March 2010 by prominent British environmentalist and Guardian columnist George Monbiot. That article exhorted bodies such as Natural England to form just such a competition, stating that the venture would raise awareness of, and potentially aid in the conservation of, Britain's least-known fauna. The results were announced on 16 July 2010, with the competition's judges declaring that the "new identity for Megapenthes lugens reflects location, character and appearance". The common name's creator, in a statement accompanying his entry, gave the following rationale for his choice of name: "I've gone with this for the link to Windsor and the royals. The executioner is to represent that it kills (and eats) the larvae of others and also links to its black colour (the hood of an executioner is traditionally black)." The names of the ten successful entrants are to be placed on permanent display in the museum.
