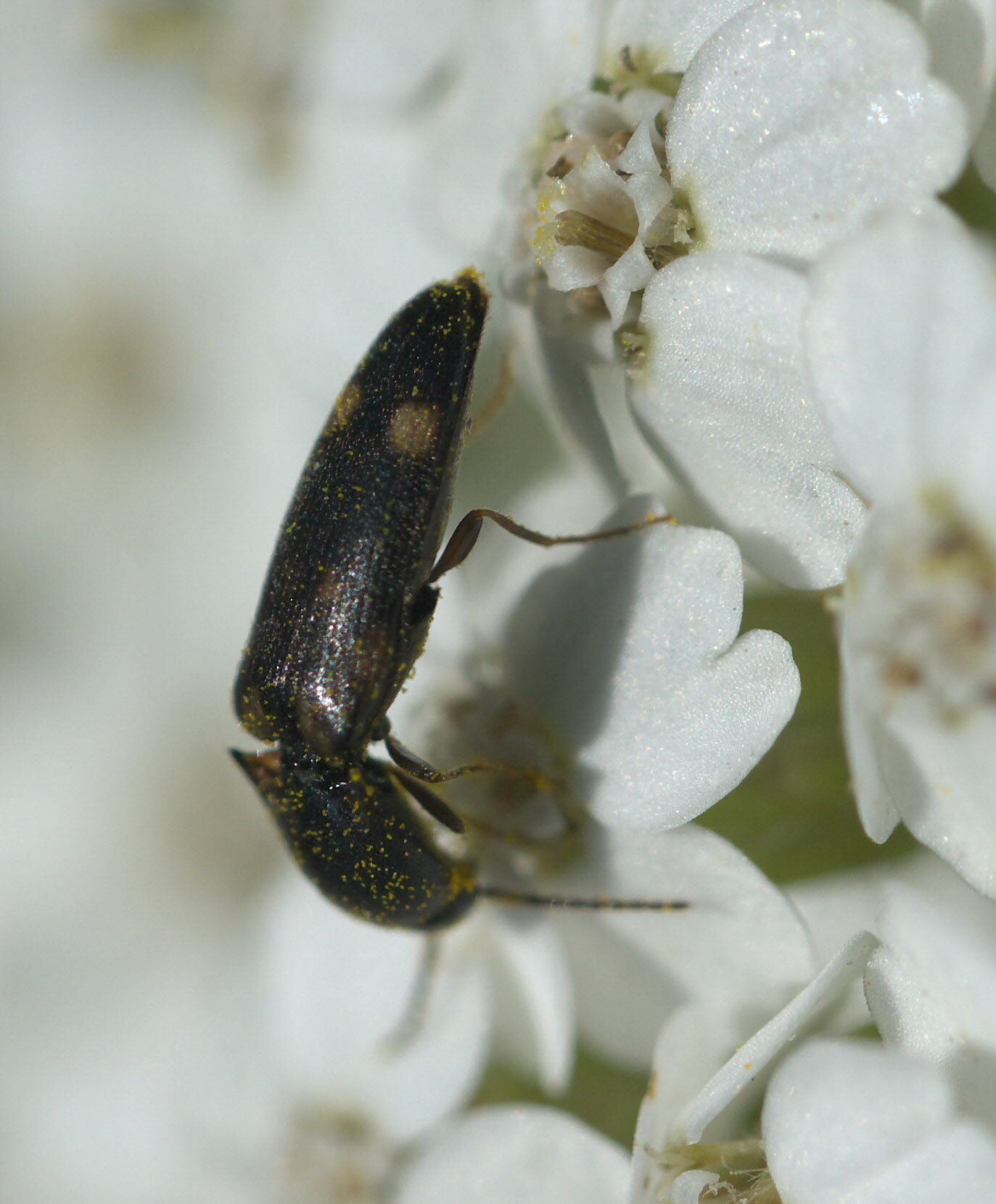

Scientific classification
- Domain: Eukaryota
- Kingdom: Animalia
- Phylum: Arthropoda
- Class: Insecta
- Order: Coleoptera
- Suborder: Polyphaga
- Infraorder: Elateriformia
- Family: Elateridae
- Subfamily: Elaterinae
- Genus: Megapenthes; Kiesenwetter, 1858

= Megapenthes (beetle) =

Genus of beetles

Megapenthes is a genus of click beetles in the family Elateridae. There are at least 30 described species in Megapenthes.

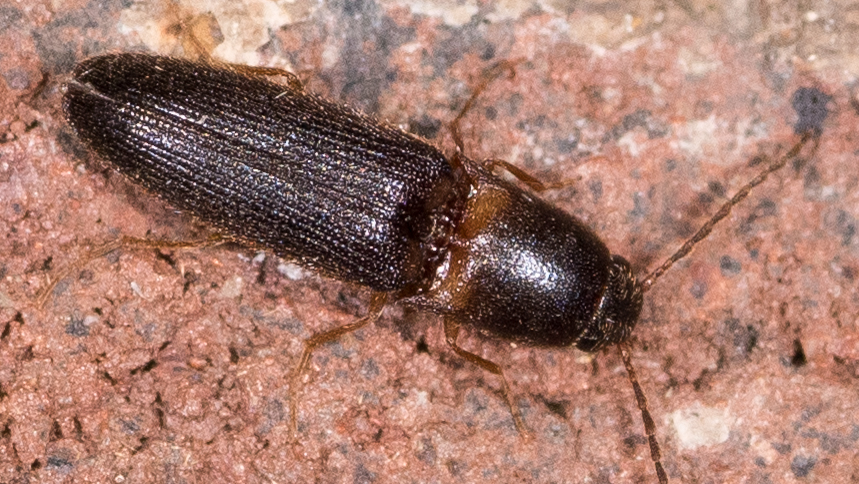
Megapenthes rufilabris

== Species ==
These 31 species belong to the genus Megapenthes:

- Megapenthes almeidai Navajas, 1946^{g}
- Megapenthes angularis (LeConte, 1866)^{b}
- Megapenthes apacheorum Becker, 1971^{g}
- Megapenthes aterrimus (Motschulsky, 1859)^{g}
- Megapenthes caprella (LeConte, 1859)^{g b}
- Megapenthes confusus Fleutiaux, 1932^{g}
- Megapenthes elegans Horn, 1871^{b}
- Megapenthes gentneri Lane, 1965^{g}
- Megapenthes gomyi Girard, 2001^{g}
- Megapenthes ibitiensis Navajas, 1944^{g}
- Megapenthes insignis (LeConte, 1884)^{b}
- Megapenthes lepidus LeConte, 1884^{b}
- Megapenthes limbalis (Herbst, 1806)^{b}
- Megapenthes longicornis Schaeffer, 1916^{b}
- Megapenthes lugens (W.Redtenbacher, 1842)^{g}
- Megapenthes nigriceps Schaeffer, 1916^{b}
- Megapenthes nigriventris LeConte, 1884^{g b}
- Megapenthes oblongicollis (Miwa, 1929)^{g}
- Megapenthes pallidulus Cate, Platia & Schimmel, 2002^{g}
- Megapenthes quadrimaculatus (Horn, 1871)^{b}
- Megapenthes rogersi Horn, 1871^{g b}
- Megapenthes rousseli Fleutiaux, 1933^{g}
- Megapenthes rufilabris (Germar, 1844)^{b}
- Megapenthes rutilipennis Candeze, 1859^{g}
- Megapenthes solitarius Fall, 1934^{g}
- Megapenthes stigmosus (LeConte, 1853)^{g b}
- Megapenthes sturmii (Germar, 1844)^{g}
- Megapenthes tarsalis Schaeffer, 1916^{b}
- Megapenthes tartareus (LeConte, 1859)^{g b}
- Megapenthes texanus Becker, 1971^{g}
- Megapenthes turbulentus (LeConte, 1853)^{b}

Data sources: i = ITIS, c = Catalogue of Life, g = GBIF, b = Bugguide.net
