= Athous campyloides =

Scientific classification
- Domain: Eukaryota
- Kingdom: Animalia
- Phylum: Arthropoda
- Class: Insecta
- Order: Coleoptera
- Suborder: Polyphaga
- Infraorder: Elateriformia
- Family: Elateridae
- Genus: Athous
- Species: A. campyloides

Binomial name
- Athous campyloides Newman, 1833

Species of beetle

Athous campyloides is a species of beetle in the family Elateridae and the genus Athous.

== Description ==
Length: 9.5–11.5 millimetres (0.37–0.45 in).
