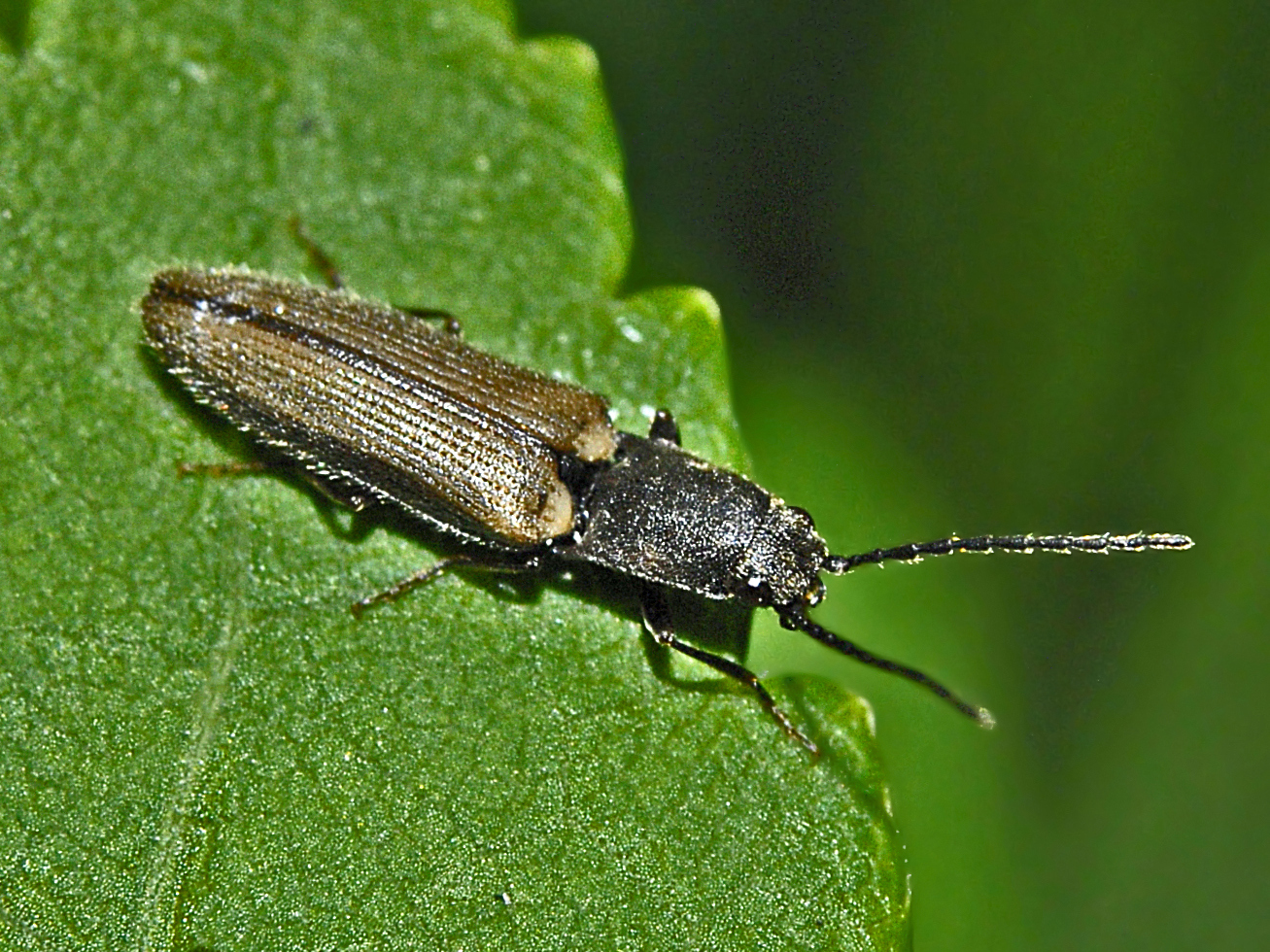
- Athous bicolor, male

Scientific classification
- Kingdom: Animalia
- Phylum: Arthropoda
- Clade: Pancrustacea
- Class: Insecta
- Order: Coleoptera
- Suborder: Polyphaga
- Infraorder: Elateriformia
- Family: Elateridae
- Genus: Athous
- Species: A. bicolor

Binomial name
- Athous bicolor (Goeze, 1777)

Synonyms
- Athous longicollis (Olivier, 1790); Elater longicollis Olivier, 1790; Elater bicolor Goeze, 1777

= Athous bicolor =

Species of beetle

Athous bicolor is a species of click beetle.

== Description ==
Athous bicolor can reach a length of 8–10 millimetres (0.31–0.39 in). Body is quite elongated, with a fine pale pubescence, long mid-brown antennae and evident longitudinal ridges and small pits on the elytra. In males the pronotum is much longer than wide, while in the females it is slightly longer than wide and slightly laterally rounded. The elytra are ochre/yellow with dark sutural band, while head and pronotum are dark brown. The hind angles of the pronotum are olive.

== Distribution ==
This species is widespread in most of Europe, from Russia through South and Central Europe to the Iberian Peninsula.

== Biology ==
Oviposition takes place from the late Spring to early Summer. The yellowish-brown larvae develop underground and feed on the roots of many grass species. Adults can be found from June to August. These beetles hibernate as imago.

== Habitat ==
Athous bicolor lives in grasslands and in areas with low vegetation and herbaceous plants.
