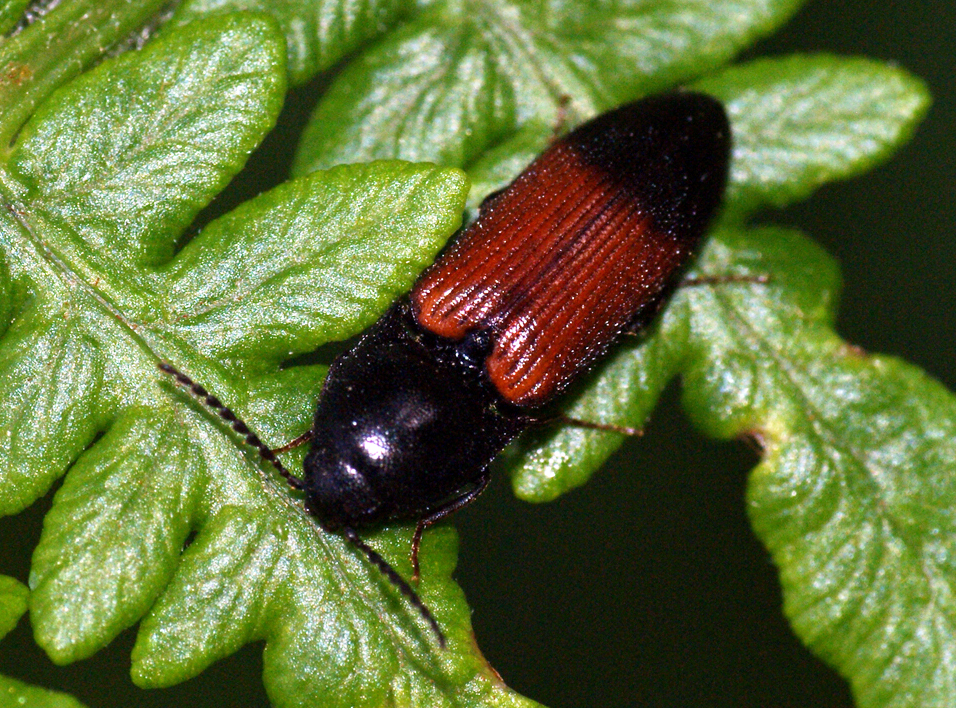

Scientific classification
- Kingdom: Animalia
- Phylum: Arthropoda
- Class: Insecta
- Order: Coleoptera
- Suborder: Polyphaga
- Infraorder: Elateriformia
- Family: Elateridae
- Genus: Ampedus
- Species: A. balteatus

Binomial name
- Ampedus balteatus (Linnaeus, 1758)

= Ampedus balteatus =

Belted Click Beetle

Species of beetle

Ampedus balteatus, the belted click beetle, is a species of beetle from the family Elateridae and the genus Ampedus. It can be found in coniferous forest habitat.

== Description ==
Beetle in length 7-10mm.
