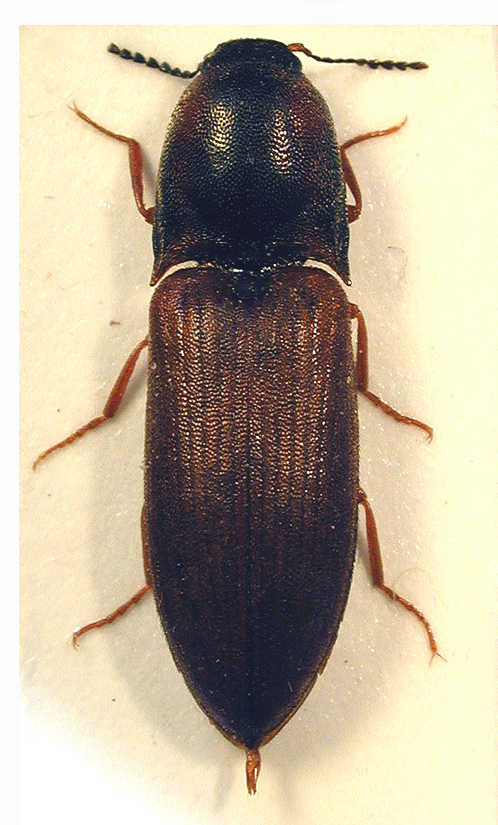
- Sericus brunneus

Scientific classification
- Kingdom: Animalia
- Phylum: Arthropoda
- Class: Insecta
- Order: Coleoptera
- Suborder: Polyphaga
- Infraorder: Elateriformia
- Superfamily: Elateroidea
- Family: Elateridae
- Genus: Sericus
- Species: S. brunneus

Binomial name
- Sericus brunneus (Linnaeus, 1758)

= Sericus brunneus =

Species of beetle

Sericus brunneus is a species of click beetles native to Europe.
