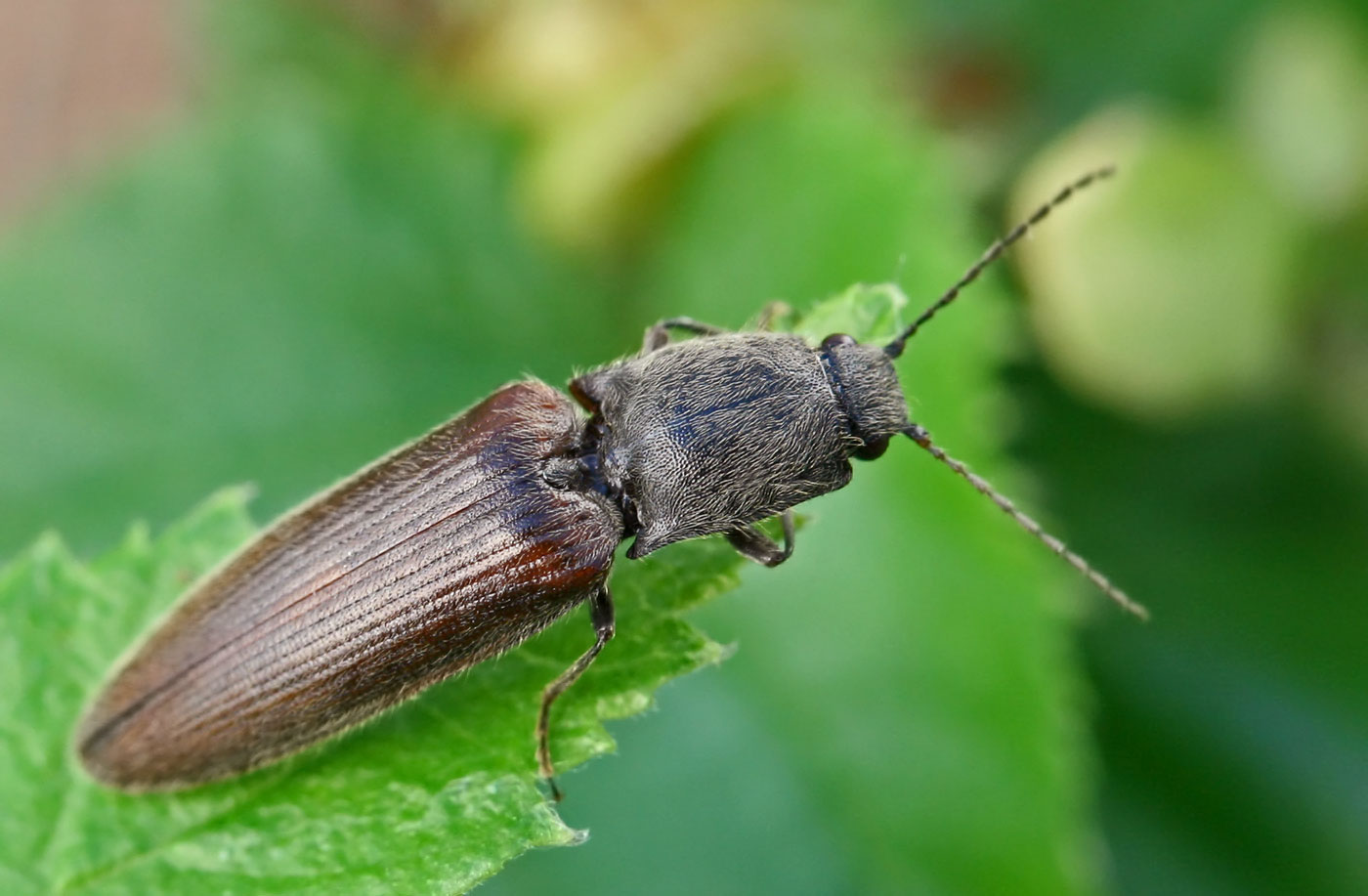

Scientific classification
- Domain: Eukaryota
- Kingdom: Animalia
- Phylum: Arthropoda
- Class: Insecta
- Order: Coleoptera
- Suborder: Polyphaga
- Infraorder: Elateriformia
- Family: Elateridae
- Genus: Athous
- Species: A. haemorrhoidalis

Binomial name
- Athous haemorrhoidalis (Fabricius, 1801)

Synonyms
- Elater haemorrhoidalis Fabricius, 1801; Mordella haemorrhoidalis Fabricius, 1801

= Athous haemorrhoidalis =

Species of beetle

Athous haemorrhoidalis is a species of European and Asian click beetles in the genus Athous. Several variations are recognized.

== Description ==
The adult is a fairly slender beetle, 10–15 mm long, with straight antennae which are long enough to reach the back of the pronotum (which covers the thorax). The head and thorax are black, the elytra brown and strongly ribbed. The pronotum is clearly dimpled all over. The whole body is covered with greyish-brown hairs. The legs are a paler brown than the elytra. Like other click beetles, the joint between thorax and abdomen forms a flexible hinge, and there is a central knob at the back of the thorax. The species is sexually dimorphic; males are smaller than females, and the side of the male's pronotum is less wavy than the female's.

== Distribution ==
This click beetle is found throughout the British Isles. It is widespread across Europe and Asia. It is predominantly a lowland species, being entirely absent above 600 m elevation, and becoming steadily scarcer from sea level up to 500 m.

== Ecology ==
Athous haemorrhoidalis in a forest clearing

If disturbed the adult can flick itself high (up to 245 mm) into the air, with a takeoff speed of up to 2.27 m/s, making a loud clicking noise. It can also use this ability to right itself if it falls onto its back.

The adults live on flowers, eating pollen. In Europe they are most active in July (like a similar species, Athous vittatus), unlike several other click beetles which are active mainly in the spring months.

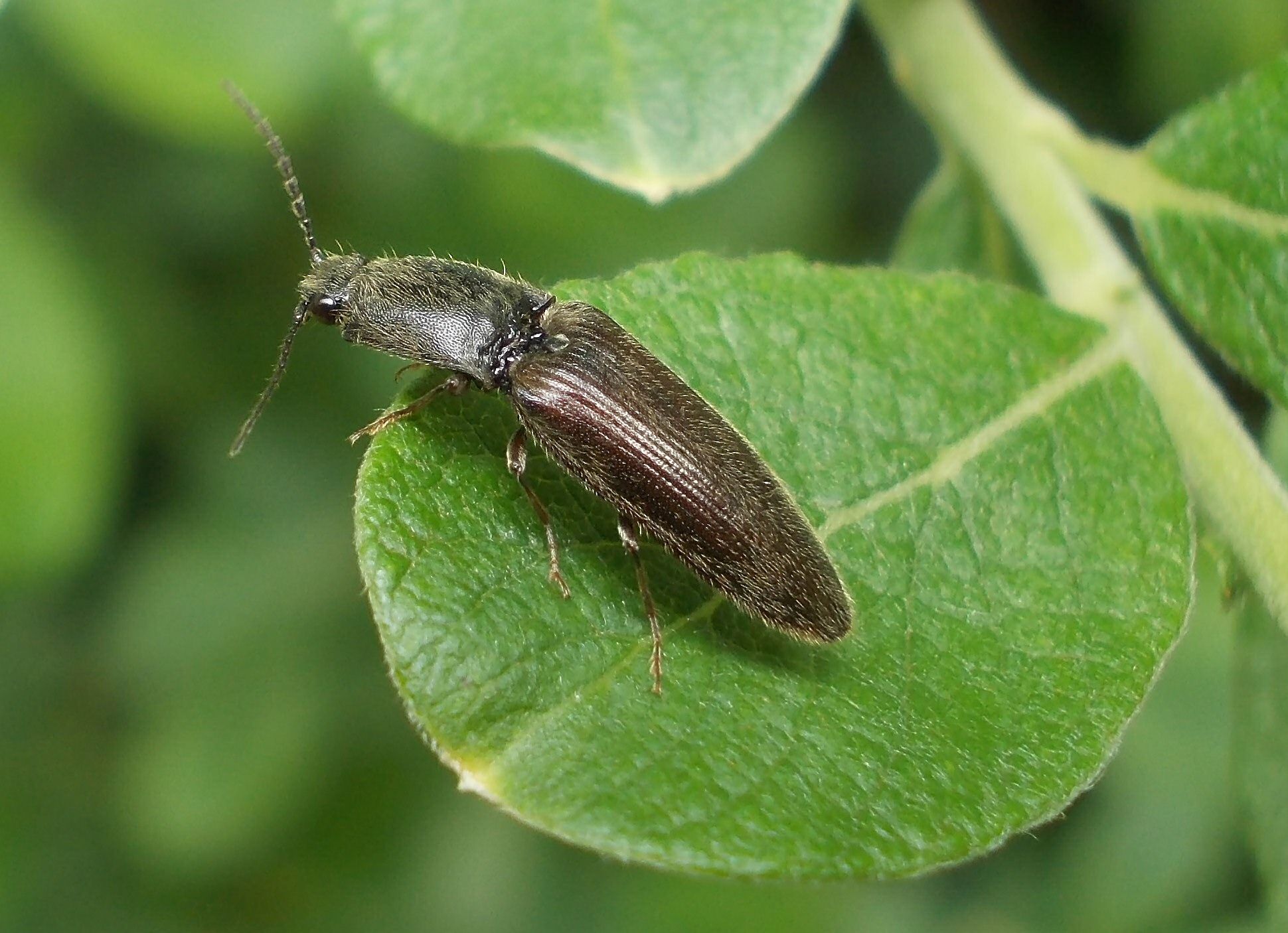
In broad-leaved forest, on sallow leaf

The species is found mainly in forests, both broad-leaved (oak and beech) and coniferous (Scots pine). They are also found in wetland habitats such as fens and peatlands. Fossils of the species have been found in Britain from the Holocene period immediately after the last ice age, from acid bog peat, a much wetter habitat than the beetle's usual habitats today.

Adults pollinate the frog orchid, Coeloglossum viride. The beetles are eaten mainly by tits; they are an important prey species for the collared flycatcher, Ficedula albicollis.

The larvae of A. haemorrhoidalis are damaging pests of agriculture. In an agricultural setting, the species is found in cereals, orchards, and potato crops. The larvae have a mixed diet, preying on the winter moth, Operophtera brumata, and eating the roots of plants, mostly grasses in the family Poaceae.
