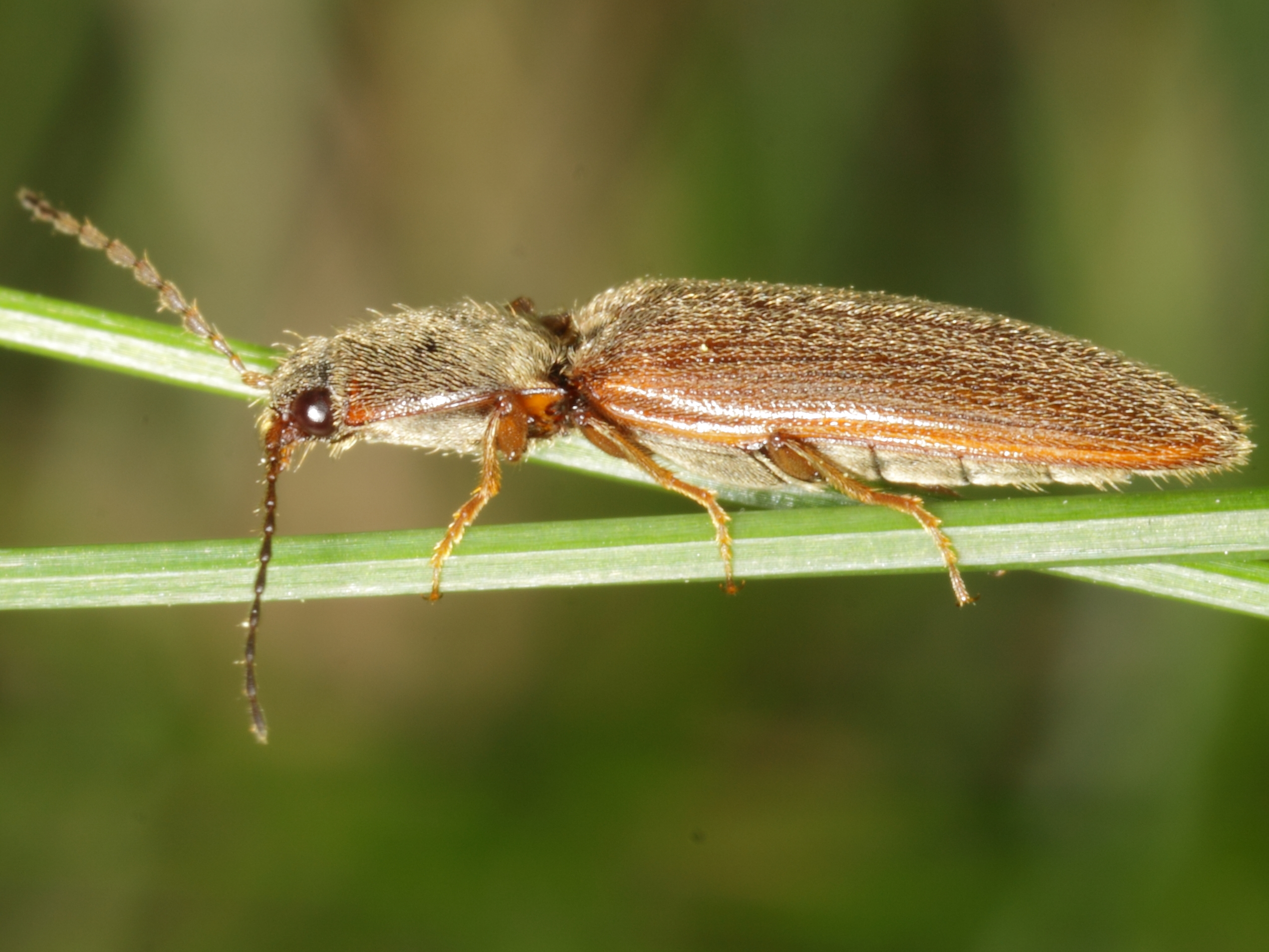

Scientific classification
- Kingdom: Animalia
- Phylum: Arthropoda
- Clade: Pancrustacea
- Class: Insecta
- Order: Coleoptera
- Suborder: Polyphaga
- Infraorder: Elateriformia
- Family: Elateridae
- Genus: Athous
- Species: A. subfuscus

Binomial name
- Athous subfuscus O.F. Müller, 1764

= Athous subfuscus =

Species of beetle

Athous subfuscus is a species of beetle in the family Elateridae and the genus Athous. It is found in the leaf litter and soil of shaded woodlands, often under mosses. Its larvae are predaceous.

== Description ==
Beetle in length 8.5 millimetres (0.33 in).
