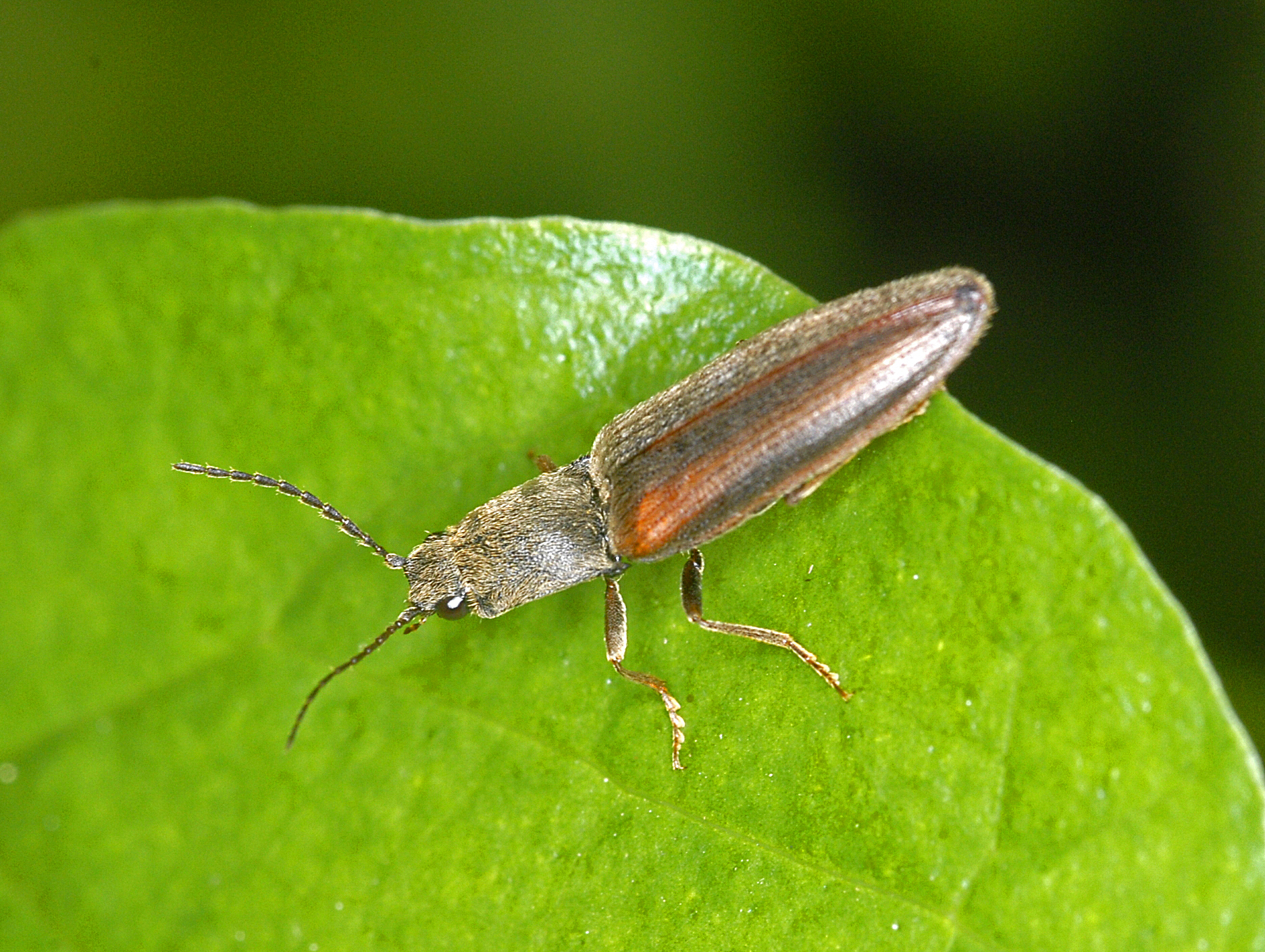

Scientific classification
- Kingdom: Animalia
- Phylum: Arthropoda
- Clade: Pancrustacea
- Class: Insecta
- Order: Coleoptera
- Suborder: Polyphaga
- Infraorder: Elateriformia
- Family: Elateridae
- Genus: Athous
- Species: A. vittatus

Binomial name
- Athous vittatus Fabricius, 1793

Synonyms
- Athous puncticollis Kiesenwetter, 1858; Elater vittatus Fabricius, 1792

= Athous vittatus =

Species of beetle

Athous vittatus is a species of beetle in the family Elateridae and the genus Athous.

== Description ==
Athous vittatus can reach a length of about 8–12 millimetres (0.31–0.47 in). The body is slightly hairy. Pronotum is generally dark brown, while elytra are usually chestnut or reddish brown with dark brown longitudinal stripes in the middle and in the outer edges. Also the legs have a light brown colour.

This species is closely related and similar to Athous haemorrhoidalis.

== Biology ==
Larvae develop in the soil feeding on the roots of various herbaceous plants. They pupate from late May until early June. Adults are associated with a wide range of broadleaved trees, especially Beech (Fagus sylvatica), Hornbeam (Carpinus betulus), Oak (Quercus spp.), Walnut (Juglans regia) and Alder trees (Alnus glutinosa).

== Distribution and habitat ==
This species is present in most of Europe and in the Near East. It is widespread and common in England. It especially occurs in mixed and broadleaved woodlands. It can be found in plain and lowlands and in highlands, at an elevation of 350–6,000 metres (1,150–19,690 ft) above sea level, but in the Alps it can reach above 1200 m.
