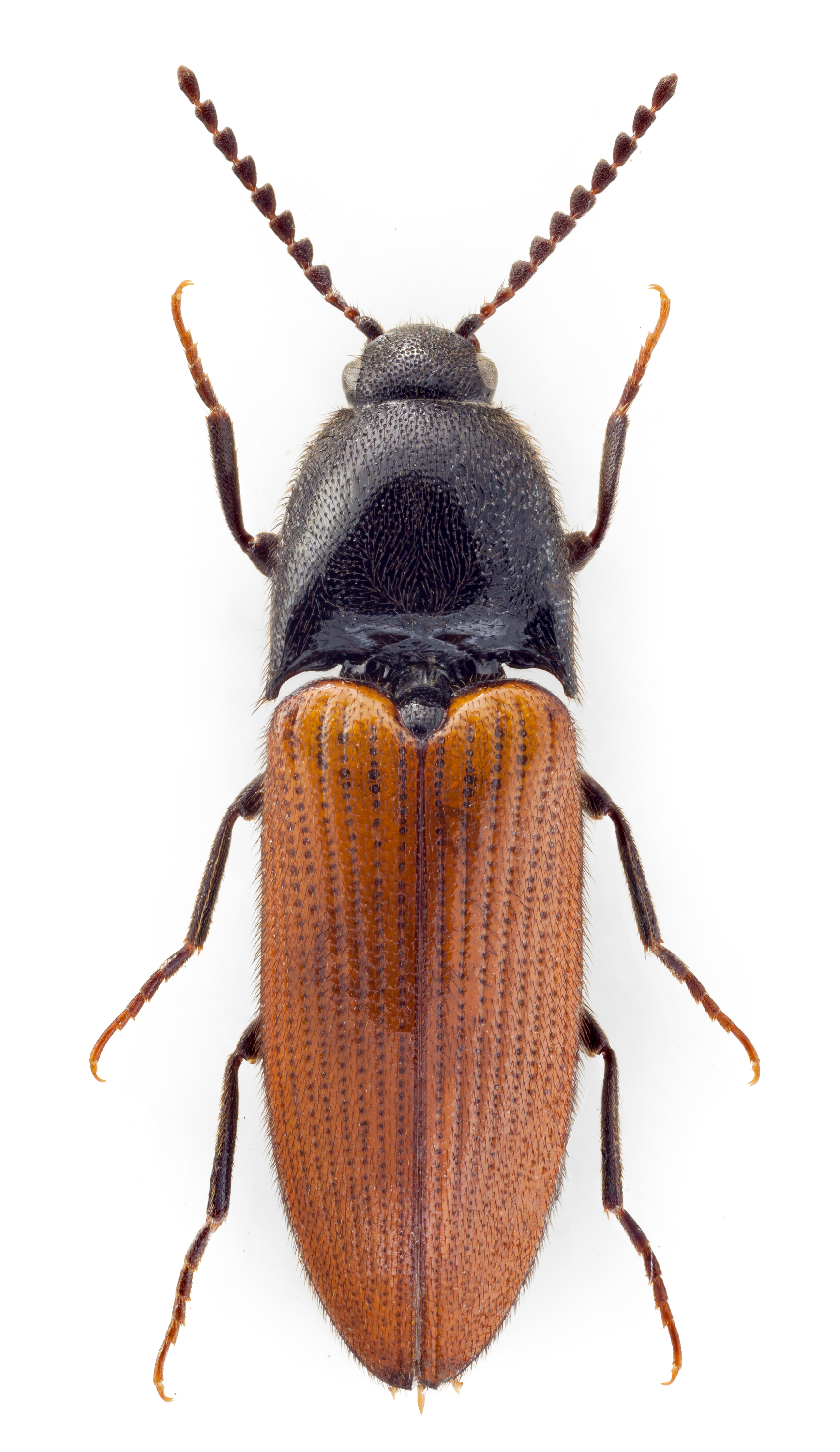

Scientific classification
- Kingdom: Animalia
- Phylum: Arthropoda
- Class: Insecta
- Order: Coleoptera
- Suborder: Polyphaga
- Infraorder: Elateriformia
- Family: Elateridae
- Genus: Ampedus
- Species: A. pomorum

Binomial name
- Ampedus pomorum (Herbst, 1784)

= Ampedus pomorum =

Species of beetle

Ampedus pomorum is a species of click beetles native to Europe.
