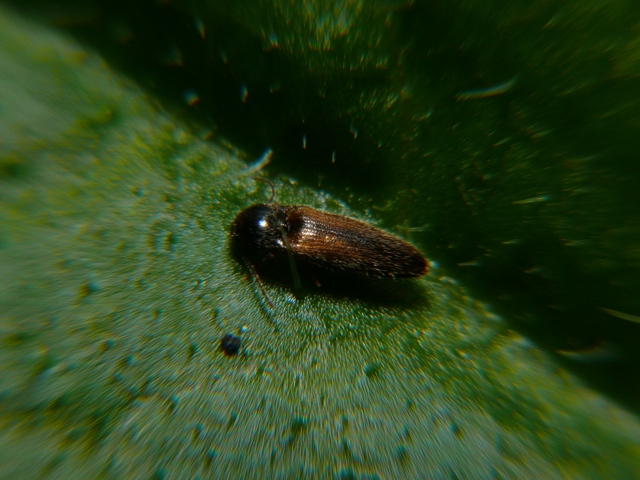

Scientific classification
- Kingdom: Animalia
- Phylum: Arthropoda
- Clade: Pancrustacea
- Class: Insecta
- Order: Coleoptera
- Suborder: Polyphaga
- Infraorder: Elateriformia
- Family: Elateridae
- Genus: Adrastus
- Species: A. rachifer

Binomial name
- Adrastus rachifer Fourcroy, 1785

= Adrastus rachifer =

Species of beetle

Adrastus rachifer is a species of beetle in the family Elateridae and the genus Adrastus.

== Description ==
The beetle is typically 3 – 4 mm in length and is in darker color with oranges or yellow highlights, especially along their legs and antennae. They feed on tree foliage and their imago stage typically emerges in June or July. While generally found in mainland Europe they have been observed living in the coastal regions of Kent.
