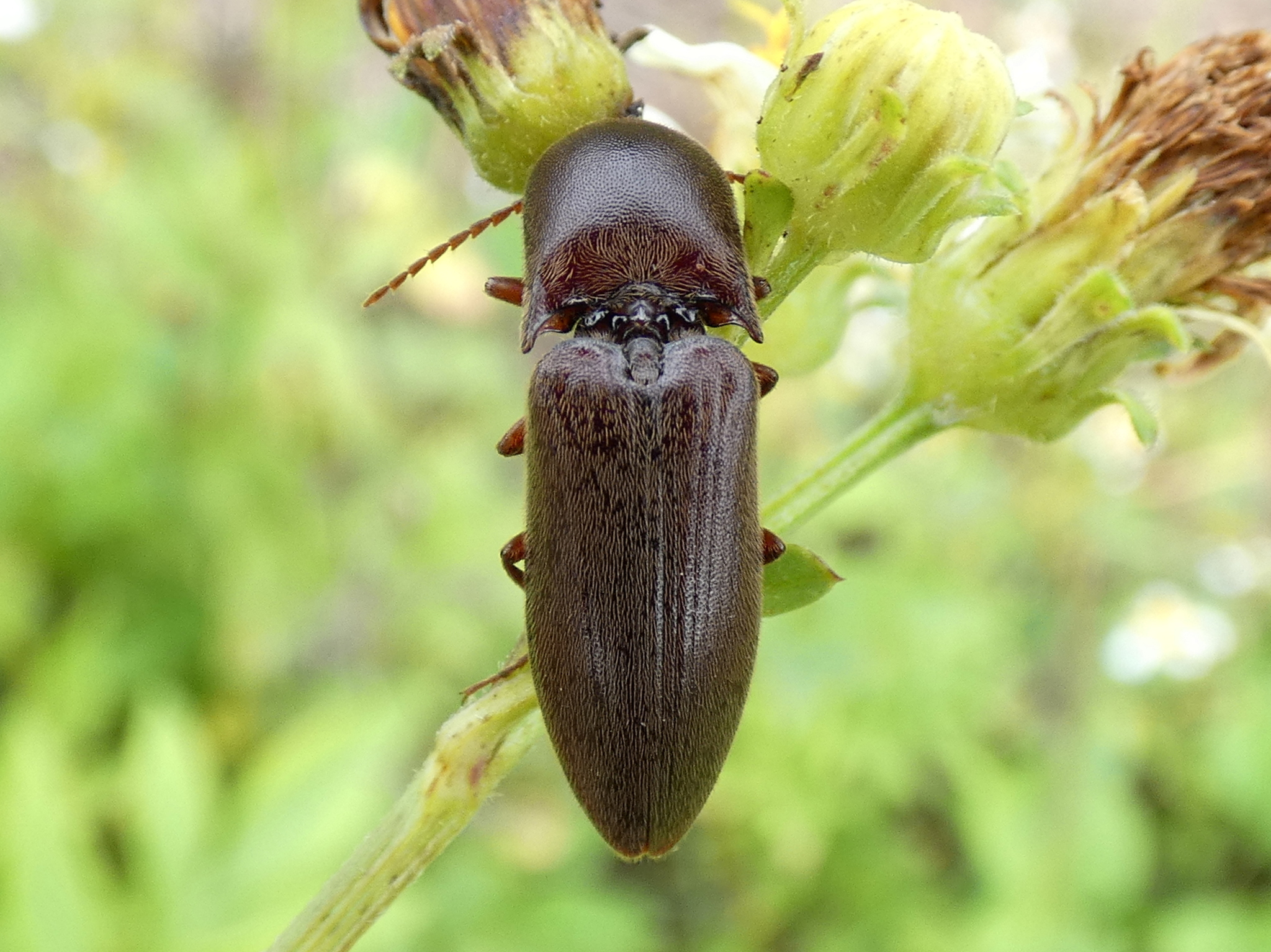
- Diplostethus carolinensis, Florida

Scientific classification
- Domain: Eukaryota
- Kingdom: Animalia
- Phylum: Arthropoda
- Class: Insecta
- Order: Coleoptera
- Suborder: Polyphaga
- Infraorder: Elateriformia
- Family: Elateridae
- Tribe: Elaterini
- Subtribe: Elaterina
- Genus: Diplostethus
- Species: D. carolinensis

Binomial name
- Diplostethus carolinensis (Schaeffer, 1916)

= Diplostethus carolinensis =

Species of click beetle

Diplostethus carolinensis is a species of click beetle in the family Elateridae, found in the southeastern United States.
