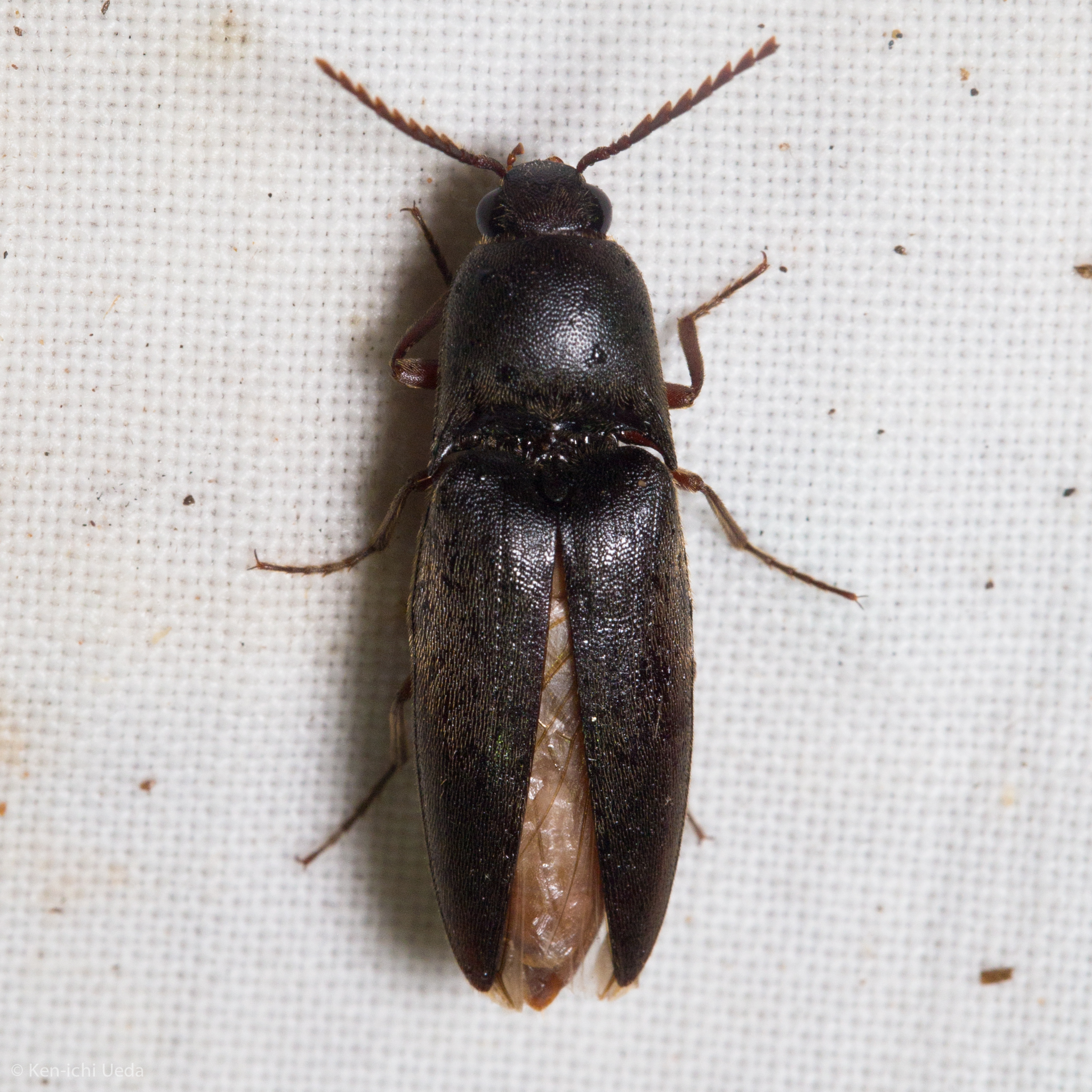
- Diplostethus opacicollis, Arizona

Scientific classification
- Domain: Eukaryota
- Kingdom: Animalia
- Phylum: Arthropoda
- Class: Insecta
- Order: Coleoptera
- Suborder: Polyphaga
- Infraorder: Elateriformia
- Family: Elateridae
- Tribe: Elaterini
- Subtribe: Elaterina
- Genus: Diplostethus
- Species: D. opacicollis

Binomial name
- Diplostethus opacicollis Schaeffer, 1916

= Diplostethus opacicollis =

Species of click beetle

Diplostethus opacicollis is a species of click beetle in the family Elateridae, found in the southwestern United States.
