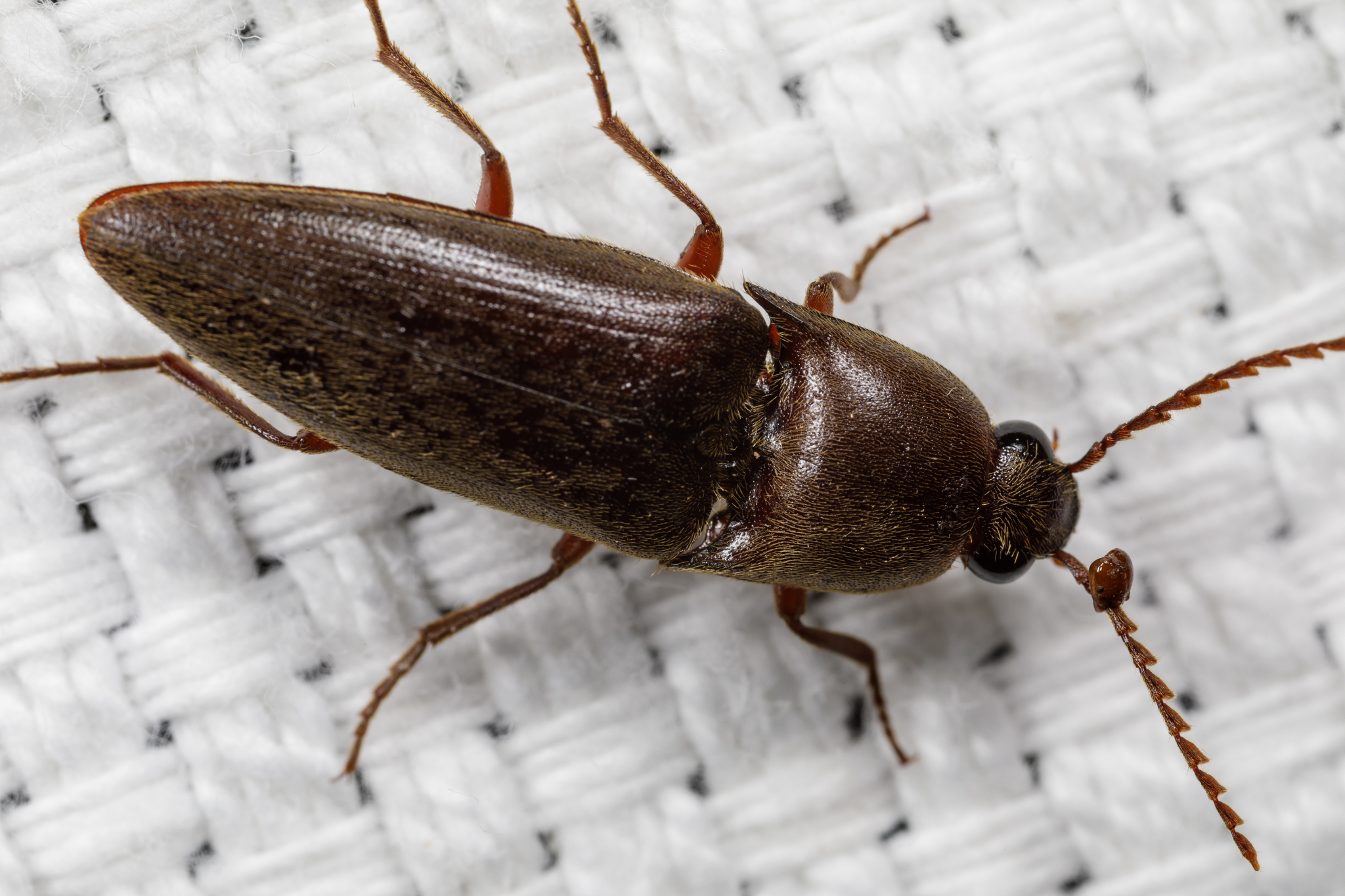
- Diplostethus texanus, Texas

Scientific classification
- Domain: Eukaryota
- Kingdom: Animalia
- Phylum: Arthropoda
- Class: Insecta
- Order: Coleoptera
- Suborder: Polyphaga
- Infraorder: Elateriformia
- Family: Elateridae
- Tribe: Elaterini
- Subtribe: Elaterina
- Genus: Diplostethus
- Species: D. texanus

Binomial name
- Diplostethus texanus (Leconte, 1853)

= Diplostethus texanus =

Species of click beetle

Diplostethus texanus is a species of click beetle in the family Elateridae, found in Texas, Oklahoma, and Arkansas.
