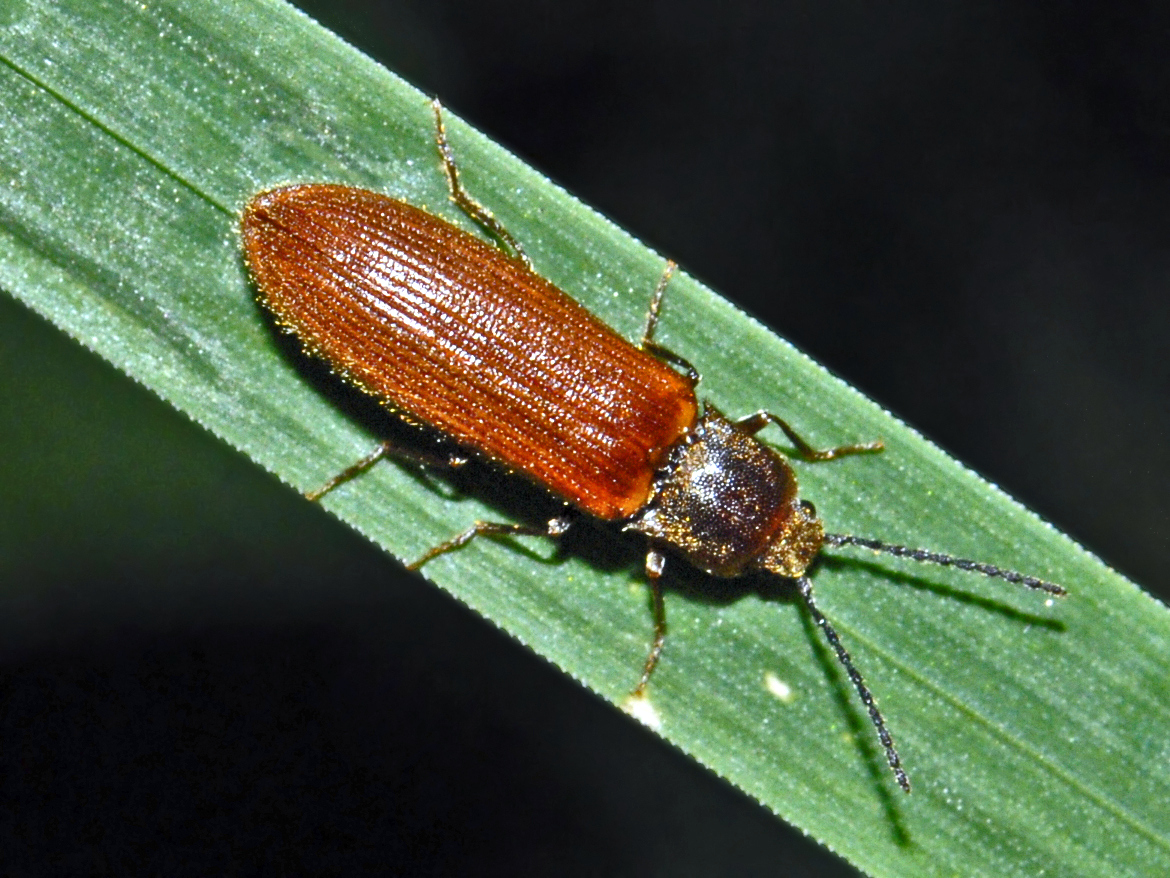

Scientific classification
- Kingdom: Animalia
- Phylum: Arthropoda
- Class: Insecta
- Order: Coleoptera
- Suborder: Polyphaga
- Infraorder: Elateriformia
- Family: Elateridae
- Subfamily: Elaterinae
- Tribe: Elaterini
- Genus: Campylomorphus; Jacquelin du Val, 1860
- Species: C. homalisinus

Binomial name
- Campylomorphus homalisinus (Illiger, 1807)

Synonyms
- Elater homalisinus Illiger, 1807; Athous suturanigra Chevrolat, 1840

= Campylomorphus =

Genus of beetles

Campylomorphus homalisinus is a species of beetles belonging to the family Elateridae, and the sole member of the genus Campylomorphus.

== Distribution and habitat ==
This species is present in France, Italy, Portugal, and Spain. This rare orophilous species occurs in shrublands, grasslands and in the forests. Adults usually forage on flowers. Larvae live in rotten wood and forest litter.

== Description ==
Campylomorphus homalisinus can reach a length of about 7 millimetres (0.28 in).
