= Elater (beetle) =

- Elater ferrugineus

Scientific classification
- Kingdom: Animalia
- Phylum: Arthropoda
- Class: Insecta
- Order: Coleoptera
- Suborder: Polyphaga
- Infraorder: Elateriformia
- Family: Elateridae
- Tribe: Elaterini
- Genus: Elater; Linnaeus, 1758

Genus of beetles

Elater is a genus of click beetle belonging to the family Elateridae.

== Species ==
Species within this genus include:

- Elater abruptus Say, 1825
- Elater acutus (Candèze, 1863)
- Elater asmodaius Wurst, 1994
- Elater ater (Candèze, 1865)
- Elater decorus (Germar, 1843)
- Elater dilaticollis (Fairmaire, 1883)
- Elater ferrugineus Linnaeus, 1758
- Elater georgelewisi (Suzuki, 1985)
- Elater lecontei (Horn, 1871)
- Elater magnicollis (Fleutiaux, 1918)
- Elater niponensis (Lewis, 1894)
- Elater pinguis (Horn, 1884)
- Elater riesei Schimmel, 2007
- Elater ruficollis (Solier, 1851)
- Elater sakishimensis Ôhira, 1967
- Elater solskyi (Suzuki, 1985)
- Elater splendens Gurjeva, 1974
- Elater tauricus (Schwarz, 1897)
- Elater thoracicus (Fleutiaux, 1918)
