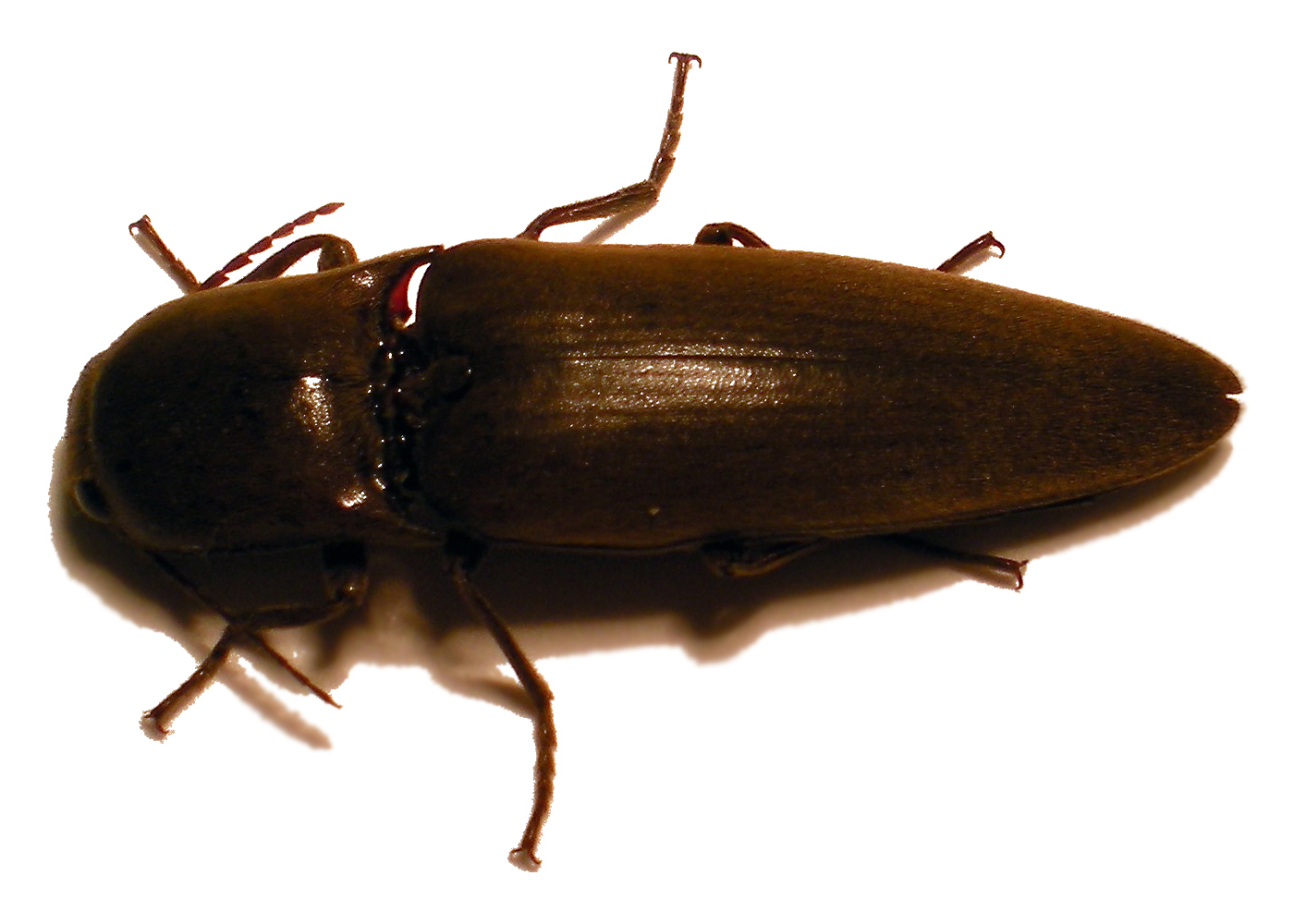
- Orthostethus infuscatus

Scientific classification
- Domain: Eukaryota
- Kingdom: Animalia
- Phylum: Arthropoda
- Class: Insecta
- Order: Coleoptera
- Suborder: Polyphaga
- Infraorder: Elateriformia
- Family: Elateridae
- Tribe: Elaterini
- Genus: Orthostethus; Lacordaire, 1857

= Orthostethus =

Genus of beetles

Orthostethus is a genus of click beetles in the family Elateridae. There are at least two described species in Orthostethus.

== Species ==
These two species belong to the genus Orthostethus:

- Orthostethus caviceps Schaeffer, 1916^{b}
- Orthostethus infuscatus (Germar, 1844)^{g b}

Data sources: i = ITIS, c = Catalogue of Life, g = GBIF, b = Bugguide.net
