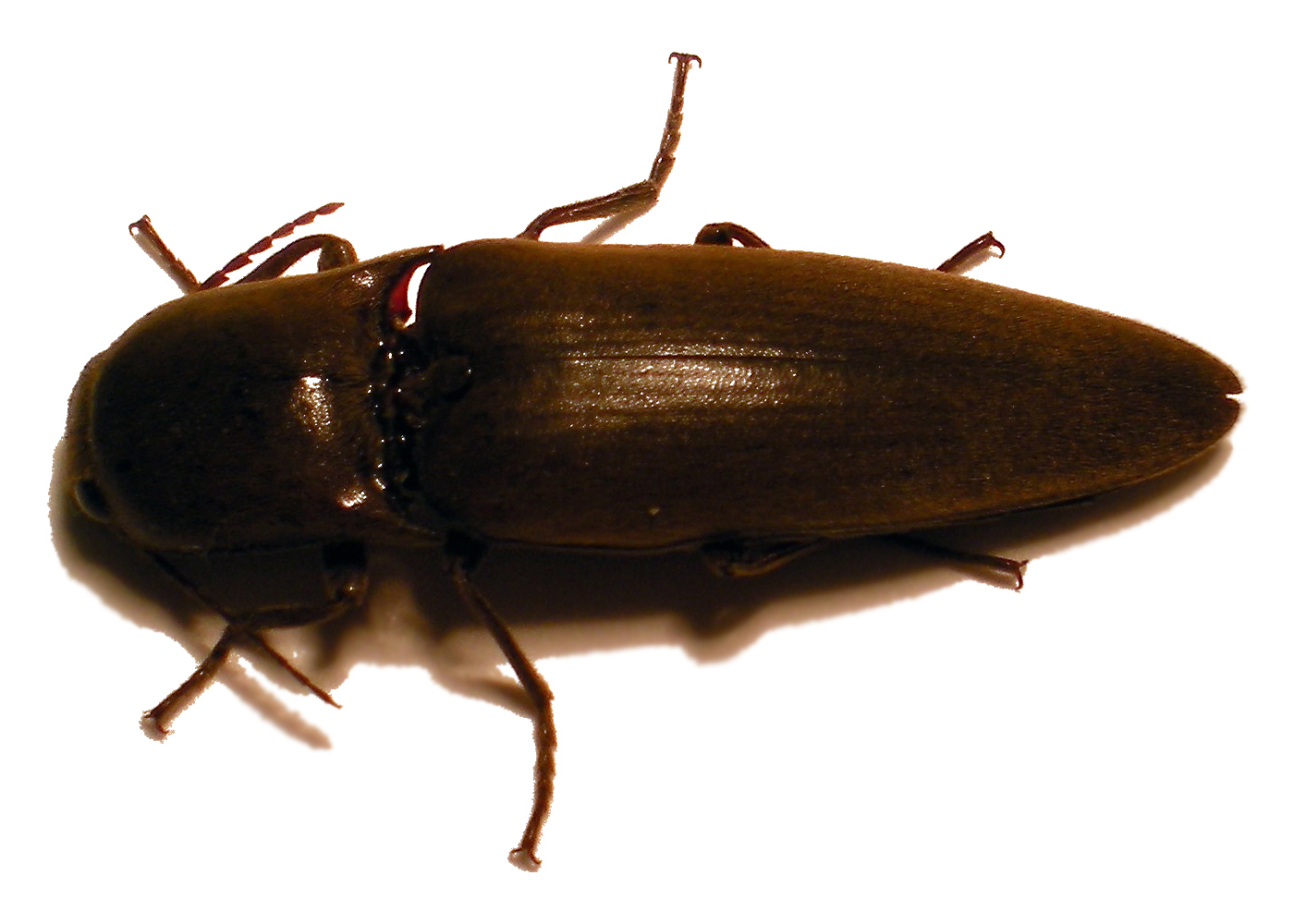

Scientific classification
- Domain: Eukaryota
- Kingdom: Animalia
- Phylum: Arthropoda
- Class: Insecta
- Order: Coleoptera
- Suborder: Polyphaga
- Infraorder: Elateriformia
- Family: Elateridae
- Genus: Orthostethus
- Species: O. infuscatus

Binomial name
- Orthostethus infuscatus (Germar, 1844)

= Orthostethus infuscatus =

Species of beetle

Orthostethus infuscatus is a species of click beetle in the family Elateridae.
