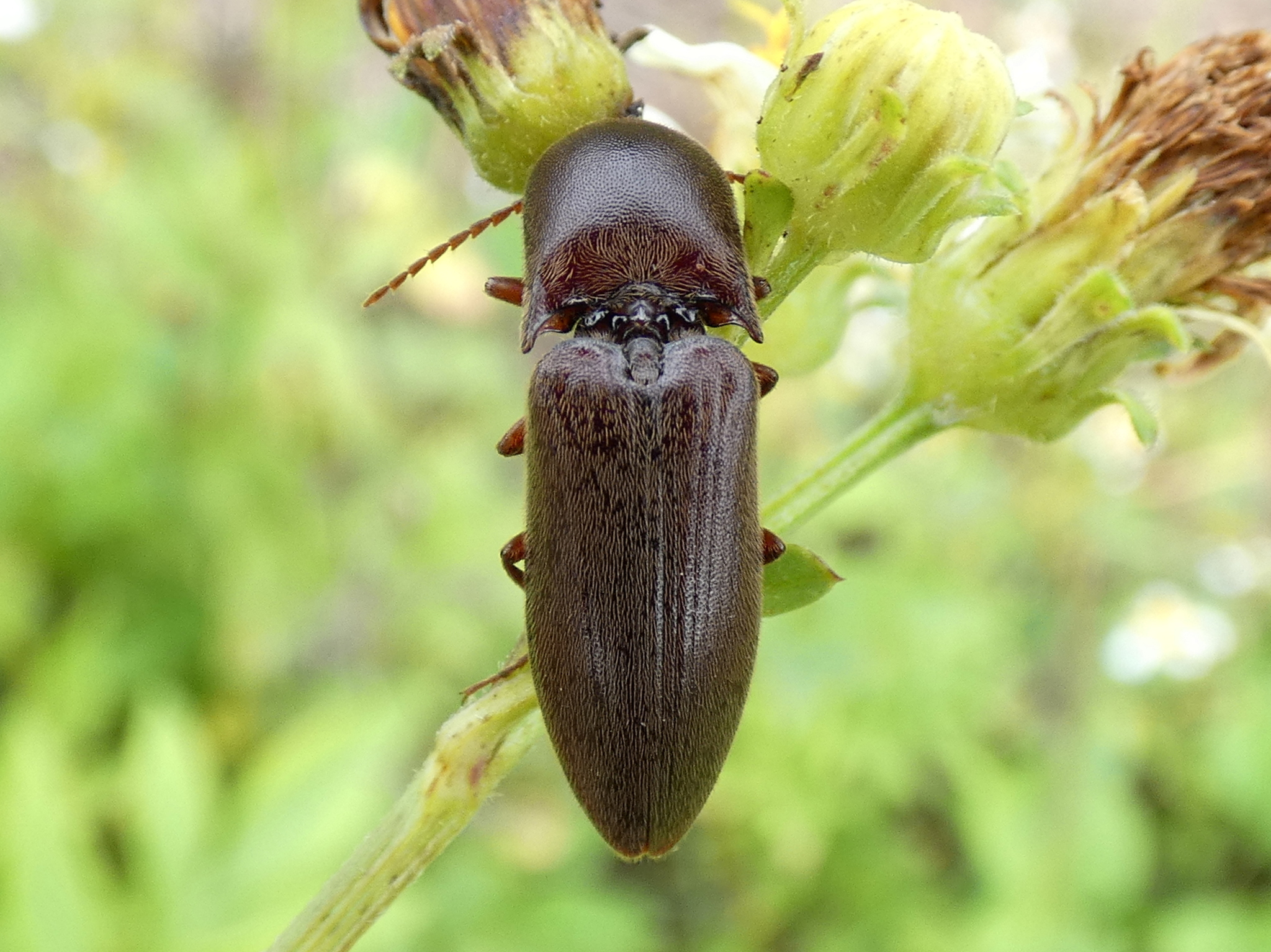
- Diplostethus carolinensis, Florida

Scientific classification
- Domain: Eukaryota
- Kingdom: Animalia
- Phylum: Arthropoda
- Class: Insecta
- Order: Coleoptera
- Suborder: Polyphaga
- Infraorder: Elateriformia
- Family: Elateridae
- Tribe: Elaterini
- Subtribe: Elaterina
- Genus: Diplostethus; Schwarz, 1907

= Diplostethus =

Genus of beetles

Diplostethus is a genus of click beetles in the family Elateridae. There are about six described species in Diplostethus, found in the Nearctic and the Neotropical Regions.

The species of Diplostethus range from 16 to 25 mm in length. They are similar to species of the genus Pittonotus.

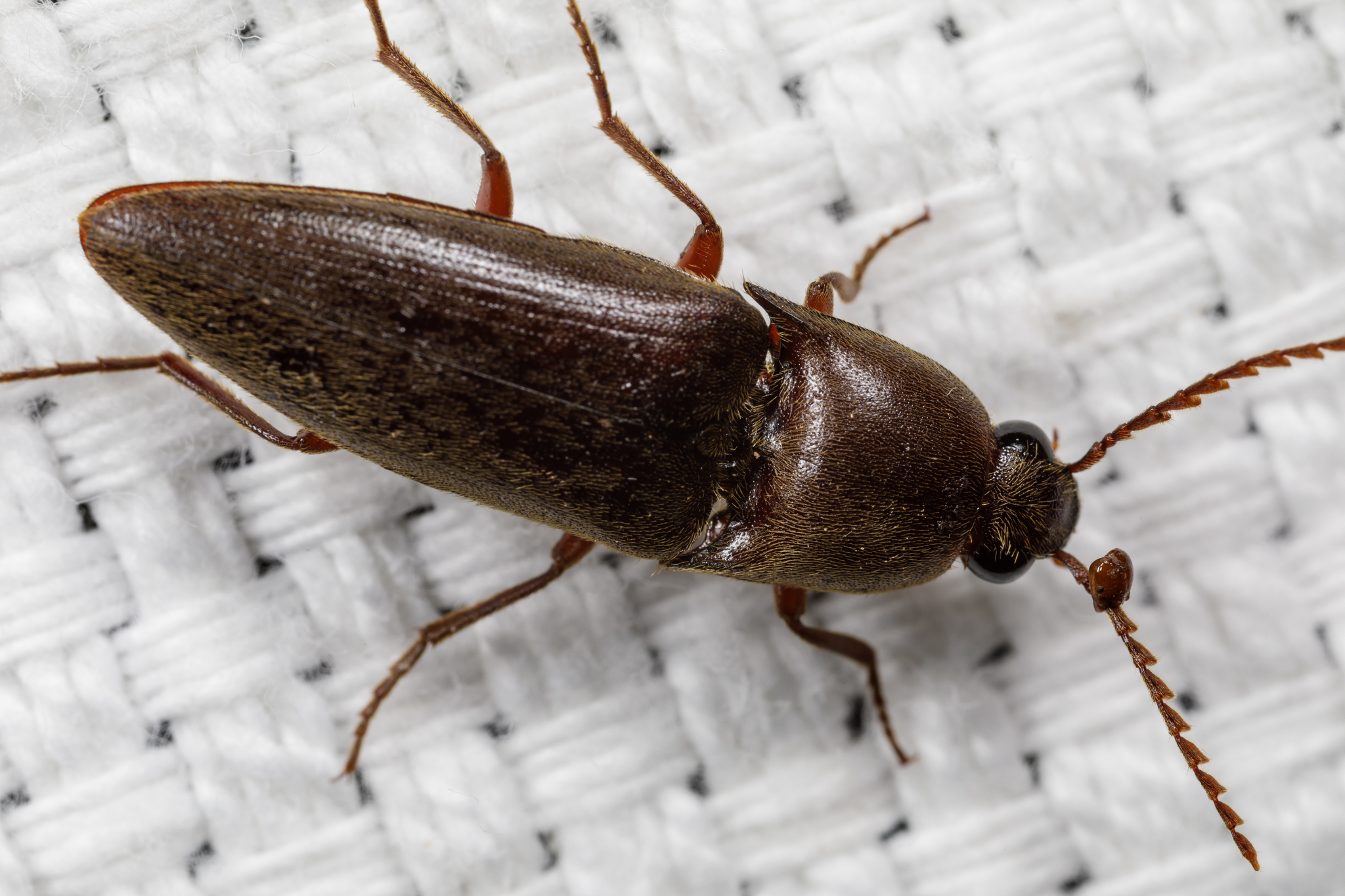
Diplostethus texanus, Texas

== Species ==
These six species belong to the genus Diplostethus:

- Diplostethus carolinensis (Schaeffer, 1916) Southeastern United States
- Diplostethus meridianus (Champion, 1895) Mexico
- Diplostethus opacicollis Schaeffer, 1916 Southwestern United States
- Diplostethus peninsularis (Champion, 1895) Southwestern United States, Mexico
- Diplostethus setosus Germar, 1844 Mexico, Central America, South America
- Diplostethus texanus (Leconte, 1853) Texas, Oklahoma, Arizona
