= Elater decorus =

Scientific classification
- Domain: Eukaryota
- Kingdom: Animalia
- Phylum: Arthropoda
- Class: Insecta
- Order: Coleoptera
- Suborder: Polyphaga
- Infraorder: Elateriformia
- Family: Elateridae
- Genus: Elater
- Species: E. decorus

Binomial name
- Elater decorus (Germar, 1843)

Species of beetle

Elater decorus is a species of click beetle in the genus Elater.
