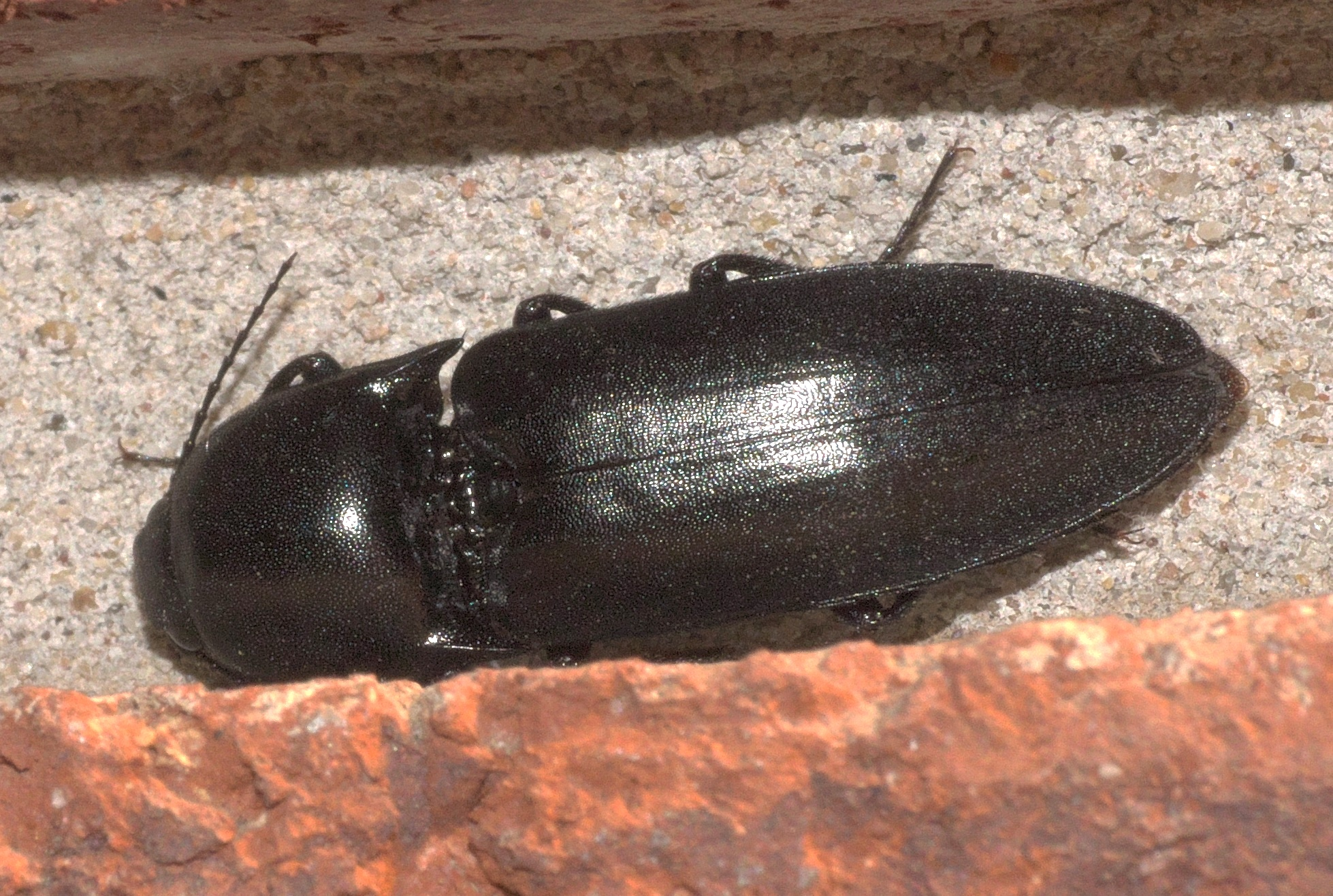
- Elater abruptus, Oklahoma

Scientific classification
- Domain: Eukaryota
- Kingdom: Animalia
- Phylum: Arthropoda
- Class: Insecta
- Order: Coleoptera
- Suborder: Polyphaga
- Infraorder: Elateriformia
- Family: Elateridae
- Genus: Elater
- Species: E. abruptus

Binomial name
- Elater abruptus Say, 1825

= Elater abruptus =

Species of beetle

Elater abruptus is a species of click beetle in the family Elateridae. It is found in the Canadian provinces of Manitoba, Ontario, New Brunswick, Nova Scotia, and Quebec as well as the U.S. state of Rhode Island.
