= Elater ferrugineus =

Scientific classification
- Kingdom: Animalia
- Phylum: Arthropoda
- Clade: Pancrustacea
- Class: Insecta
- Order: Coleoptera
- Suborder: Polyphaga
- Infraorder: Elateriformia
- Family: Elateridae
- Genus: Elater
- Species: E. ferrugineus

Binomial name
- Elater ferrugineus Linnaeus, 1758

Synonyms
- Elater ferrugineus ferrugineus Linnaeus, 1758; Ludius ferrugineus (Linnaeus, 1758)

Species of beetle

Elater ferrugineus, the rusty click beetle, is a species of click beetle belonging to the family Elateridae.

== Varietas ==
Varietas include:

- Elater ferrugineus var. morio Schilsky, 1888
- Elater ferrugineus var. occitanicus de Villers, 1789

== Distribution ==
This species is widespread in the Western Palearctic realm.

== Description ==
Elater ferrugineus can reach a length of 17–24 millimetres (0.67–0.94 in). This species is rather variable. Head is dark brown. Pronotum and elytra of males are usually bright orange or reddish, while females show a uniform dark brown color and are smaller than males. The legs are black. The antennae are mid-brown to black. In males they extend up to the posterior edge of the pronotum, while in females they are shorter.

== Biology ==
Larvae develop in hole of ancient trees of various species, mainly oak (Quercus robur), ash (Fraxinus excelsior), beech (Fagus sylvatica) and elm (Ulmus spp.). The life cycle lasts 4–6 years. Pupation occurs in spring. These larvae are predatory. They especially prey on hermit beetle (Osmoderma eremita) and rose chafer (Cetonia aurata).

When male E. ferrugineus are attracted to a female, they release compounds that attract other males to the site. These compounds include geranyl, nerylacetone and 6-methyl-5-heptene-2-one. Attraction of males only occurs in the presence of females, ensuring increased mating opportunities.
