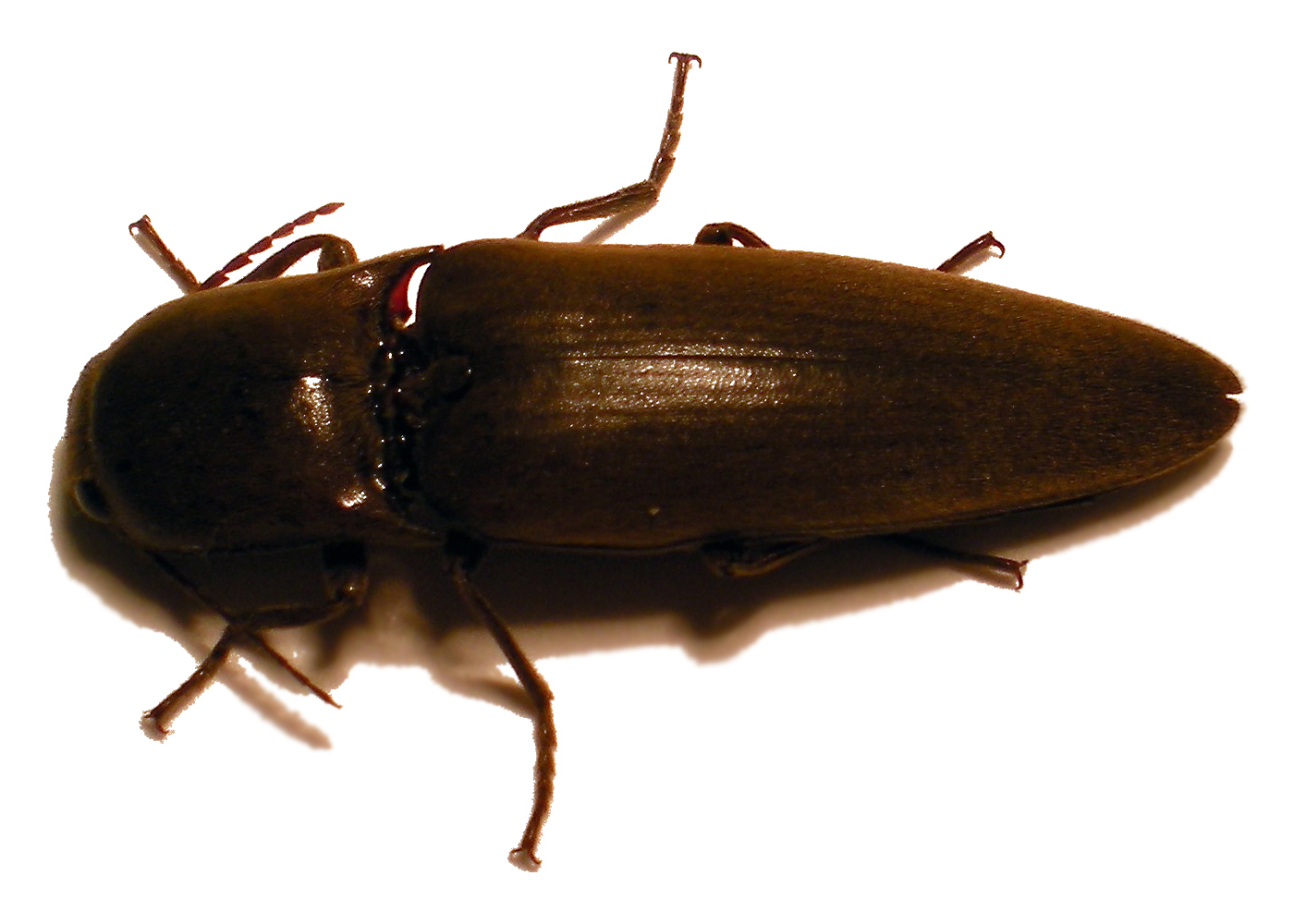
- Orthostethus infuscatus

Scientific classification
- Kingdom: Animalia
- Phylum: Arthropoda
- Class: Insecta
- Order: Coleoptera
- Suborder: Polyphaga
- Infraorder: Elateriformia
- Family: Elateridae
- Subfamily: Elaterinae
- Tribe: Elaterini; Leach, 1815

= Elaterini =

Tribe of beetles

Elaterini is a tribe of click beetles in the family Elateridae. There are about 7 genera and 17 described species in Elaterini.

== Genera ==
These genera belong to the tribe Elaterini:

- Campylomorphus Jacquelin du Val, 1860
- Diplostethus Schwarz, 1907^{b}
- Dolerosomus Motschulsky, 1859^{g b}
- Elater Linnaeus, 1758^{b}
- Mulsanteus Gozis, 1875^{g b} (brown wireworms)
- Orthostethus Lacordaire, 1857^{g b}
- Parallelostethus Schwarz, 1907^{g b}
- Sericus Eschscholtz, 1829^{g b}

Data sources: i = ITIS, c = Catalogue of Life, g = GBIF, b = Bugguide.net
