= Brongniartia (disambiguation) =

Brongnartia can refer to:

- Brongniartia (plant), a genus of leguminous plant, family Fabaceae
- Brongniartia (beetle), a genus of beetle, family Elateridae
- Brongniartia (trilobite), a genus of trilobite
  - Brongniartia isotelea, a junior synonym of the trilobite Isotelus gigas
  - Brongniartia trilobitoides, a former name of the Antarctic crustacean Serolis trilobitoides

== See also ==
- Brongniart (surname)
- Brongniartieae (plant tribus), the tribe clade that the plant genus Brongniartia belongs
- Data related to Brongniartieae at Wikispecies
