= Epilupinine =

Names
- IUPAC name [(1S,9aR)-2,3,4,6,7,8,9,9a-octahydro-1H-quinolizin-1-yl]methanol
- Other names: DTXSID901318170; DTXCID601747958

Identifiers
CAS Number	486-71-5
3D model (JSmol)	Interactive image; Interactive image
ChemSpider	82587
PubChem CID	92767
UNII	F74RAC8A5Q
CompTox Dashboard (EPA)	DTXSID901318170
- InChI: InChI=1S/C10H19NO/c12-8-9-4-3-7-11-6-2-1-5-10(9)11/h9-10,12H,1-8H2/t9-,10-/m1/s1 Key: HDVAWXXJVMJBAR-NXEZZACHSA-N
- SMILES: C1CCN2CCC[C@@H]([C@H]2C1)CO; C1CCN2CCC[C@@H]([C@H]2C1)CO

Properties
Chemical formula	C_{10}H_{19}NO
Molar mass	169.26

Hazards
- GHS labelling
Pictograms	(GHS07: Exclamation mark)
Signal word	Warning
Hazard statements	H302, H303
- Except where otherwise noted, data are given for materials in their standard state (at 25 °C [77 °F], 100 kPa). Infobox references

Epilupinine is a naturally occurring quinolizidine alkaloid. Epilupinine serves as a key model compound in the study of quinolizidine biosynthesis, chemical ecology, and asymmetric synthesis.

== Structure ==
It is the C-1 epimer of the more common alkaloid lupinine. It is a stereoisomer of a fundamental lupin alkaloid. It possesses a fused bicyclic structure comprising a piperidine and a pyridine ring, with a hydroxymethyl group at the ring junction.

Epilupinins and lupinine themselves are the simplest of a large group of alkaloid metabolites from legumes (Fabaceae).

== biological sources ==
Natural occurrence of epilupinine in the Fabaceae family, epilupinine was found in Maackia tenuifolia, Virgilia oroboides, Thinicola incana, Retama sphaerocarpa, in other representatives of the genus Maackia, Lamprolobium, Anarthrophyllum, Plagiocarpus, it was discovered as a new one in the genus Calpurnia, in the species Calpurnia aurea.

The highest and most widespread content of epilupinine is found in the genus Lupinus, with the highest content occurring in Lupinus luteus.

== Synthesis and biosynthesis ==
It was first isolated from various species within the plant genus Lupinus (lupins). They were synthesized via an intermediate enaminone.

Asymmetric total synthesis (Enantioselective synthesis) of (+)-. So far, 17 asymmetric total syntheses of epilupinine. The total synthesis involved alkylations of N-nosylamide, ozone oxidation, and sequential reactions of the removal of the nosyl group, intramolecular dehydrative condensation, intramolecular Mannich reaction catalyzed by l-proline, and a reduction.

The biosynthetic pathway of 1 is proposed to begin with the dimerization of l-lysine to dialdehyde. The intramolecular dehydrative condensation leading to iminium cation followed by an intramolecular Mannich reaction forms aldehyde. Finally, the aldehyde is reduced.

== Dementia models ==
To improve dementia symptoms and neuroinflammation in a mouse model of scopolamine-induced dementia, a model was created using scopolamine hydrobromide, with donepezil used as a positive control. After five days of treatment, cognitive function was assessed using the Morris water maze test. An inflammatory marker array was used to measure inflammatory markers in the prefrontal cortex. The Morris water maze test revealed that the model group receiving scopolamine hydrobromide (1 mg/kg) demonstrated significantly fewer platform crossings and longer latencies (P < 0.001), while mice treated with epilupinine at a dose of (5 mg/kg) demonstrated improved performance, a higher number of crossings and reduced latency (P < 0.01).
