= Behaimia =

Conservation status
- Least Concern (IUCN 3.1)

Scientific classification
- Kingdom: Plantae
- Clade: Tracheophytes
- Clade: Angiosperms
- Clade: Eudicots
- Clade: Rosids
- Order: Fabales
- Family: Fabaceae
- Subfamily: Faboideae
- Tribe: Brongniartieae
- Genus: Behaimia; Griseb. (1866)
- Species: B. cubensis

Binomial name
- Behaimia cubensis Griseb. (1866)
- The distribution of Behaimia

Synonyms
- Behaimia roigii Borhidi (1978)

Genus of legumes

Behaimia is a monotypic genus of flowering plants in the family Fabaceae. It is only found in Cuba. It has only one accepted species, Behaimia cubensis. It can be distinguished from related genera, Cyclolobium and Limadendron by:

pinnately multifoliolate (vs. unifoliolate) leaves, a sessile (vs. stipitate) ovary, and an indehiscent or late dehiscent one-seeded pod.
