= Lupinus anatolicus =

Scientific classification
- Kingdom: Plantae
- Clade: Embryophytes
- Clade: Tracheophytes
- Clade: Angiosperms
- Clade: Eudicots
- Clade: Rosids
- Order: Fabales
- Family: Fabaceae
- Subfamily: Faboideae
- Genus: Lupinus
- Species: L. anatolicus

Binomial name
- Lupinus anatolicus W.Święcicki & W.K.Święcicki

Species of plant

Lupinus anatolicus is a species of lupine in the legume family (Fabaceae), native to southwestern Turkey. First described as a new species in 1996, this plant grows to 24–40 cm in height with distinctive long white hairs on its stems and petioles. It features compound leaves with 7–9 dark green leaflets, blue flowers with white markings, and pods containing 3–5 brown seeds. Initially classified among smooth-seeded Old World lupins, subsequent genetic and microscopic analysis revealed it actually belongs to the rough-seeded group and is most closely related to Lupinus pilosus and L. palaestinus. The species has a moderate protein content and a relatively low alkaloid level in its seeds, distinguishing it biochemically from related lupine species.

== Description ==
Lupinus anatolicus grows to a height of about 24–40 cm. It features strong, dense pubescence (hairiness) on both stems and petioles, with the white hairs being particularly long (exceeding 3 mm) and spreading outward. The stipules (leaf-like structures at the base of leaf stalks) are linear, measuring roughly 14 by 1 mm.

Each compound leaf consists of 7–9 dark green leaflets arranged in an oblanceolate shape (broader toward the tip). The leaflets are pointed and densely covered with silky hairs on both sides. The leaf area during flowering averages about 15 cm^{2}.

The inflorescence forms a raceme (an unbranched, elongated flower cluster) with flowers arranged in a subverticillate pattern (nearly but not completely whorled). Individual flowers are of medium size, measuring 19 mm in length and 24 mm in width. The flowers are blue, with the standard petal (banner) displaying a distinctive white median sector that is separated from the apex by a blue margin. The lower lip of the calyx is noticeably shorter than in related species, and the flower stalks (pedicels) are about half the length of the calyx.

The pods are 5.0–6.5 cm long and 1.8–2.2 cm wide, with a distinctive green-grey pubescence that becomes lighter after ripening. Each pod typically contains 3–5 seeds. The seeds are brown, fairly large (10–12 by 6–10 by 4–5 mm) and slightly flattened, with a weight of 210–240 grammes per 1000 seeds. Unlike some related species, the seed coat is smooth rather than rough, placing it in the smooth-seeded group of Old World lupins.

Biochemically, L. anatolicus is characterized by moderate protein content (37.3%) and low fat content (3.0%) in the seeds. The total alkaloid level (1.30%) is significantly lower than in related species, with a distinctive alkaloid composition that includes epilupinine and N-oxyepilupinine, which are absent in L. micranthus.

This species is distinct from other Old World lupins in its morphological, physiological, and biochemical characteristics, and artificial crossing attempts with related species have been unsuccessful, supporting its classification as a separate species.

== Taxonomy ==
Lupinus anatolicus was first formally described by Wiktor Święcicki and Wojciech K. Święcicki in 1996, based on specimens collected during a 1977 expedition to southwestern Turkey. The species name "anatolicus" refers to Anatolia, the peninsula comprising much of modern Turkey where the plant was discovered. The species was identified as distinct from other wild lupin species growing in the region, including L. pilosus, L. micranthus, and L. angustifolius.

Initially, L. anatolicus was classified in the smooth-seeded group of Old World lupins, which also includes cultivated species like L. albus, L. angustifolius, L. hispanicus, L. luteus, and the primitive species L. micranthus. This classification was based primarily on macroscopic seed coat characteristics, which appeared smooth to the naked eye.

However, subsequent research by Aïnouche and Bayer (2000) using scanning electron microscopy revealed that the seed coat of L. anatolicus actually shows pluricellular tubercles (protuberances) typical of the "rough-seeded" lupins (section Scabrispermae), despite appearing smooth macroscopically. The narrow spaces between these tubercles, combined with the small seed size, explain the apparent smoothness of the seeds.

Genetic analysis using nuclear ribosomal DNA sequences (internal transcribed spacer) further confirmed that L. anatolicus is most closely related to L. pilosus and L. palaestinus within the Scabrispermae section, not to the smooth-seeded lupins as originally thought. The genetic distance between L. anatolicus and the smooth-seeded lupins ranged from 4.1 to 5.9%, while its distance to the rough-seeded lupins was only 0.6–1.5%, with L. pilosus and L. palaestinus being the most closely related species.

The inability to produce hybrid seeds when artificially crossed with L. micranthus provides further evidence of its taxonomic separation from the smooth-seeded group. However, similar Anatolian and Syrian lupine lines have been reported to successfully cross with other L. pilosus accessions, suggesting a close relationship to this species.

These findings indicate that L. anatolicus is either a variant of L. pilosus or a closely related species within the Scabrispermae section, rather than a new smooth-seeded species as originally described. The genetic, morphological, and reproductive evidence suggests that while L. anatolicus shows distinct characteristics from typical L. pilosus populations, its full species status remains uncertain.

Further research by Aïnouche and colleagues (2004) placed L. anatolicus within a comprehensive phylogenetic framework of the entire Lupinus genus. Their analysis of ITS sequences from nuclear ribosomal DNA confirmed that L. anatolicus shares the same chromosome number (2n=42) as L. pilosus and L. palaestinus and firmly belongs within the Pilosus-Palaestinus subclade of the section Scabrispermae. The study demonstrated that Old World lupines evolved along three distinct lineages – two in the Mediterranean region (containing primarily smooth-seeded species) and one in North Africa (containing the rough-seeded group to which L. anatolicus belongs). This broader phylogenetic context reinforced the finding that L. anatolicus should not be classified with smooth-seeded species like L. micranthus despite the macroscopic appearance of its seeds.
