= Pierre François Marie Auguste Dejean =

French entomologist and soldier (1780-1845)

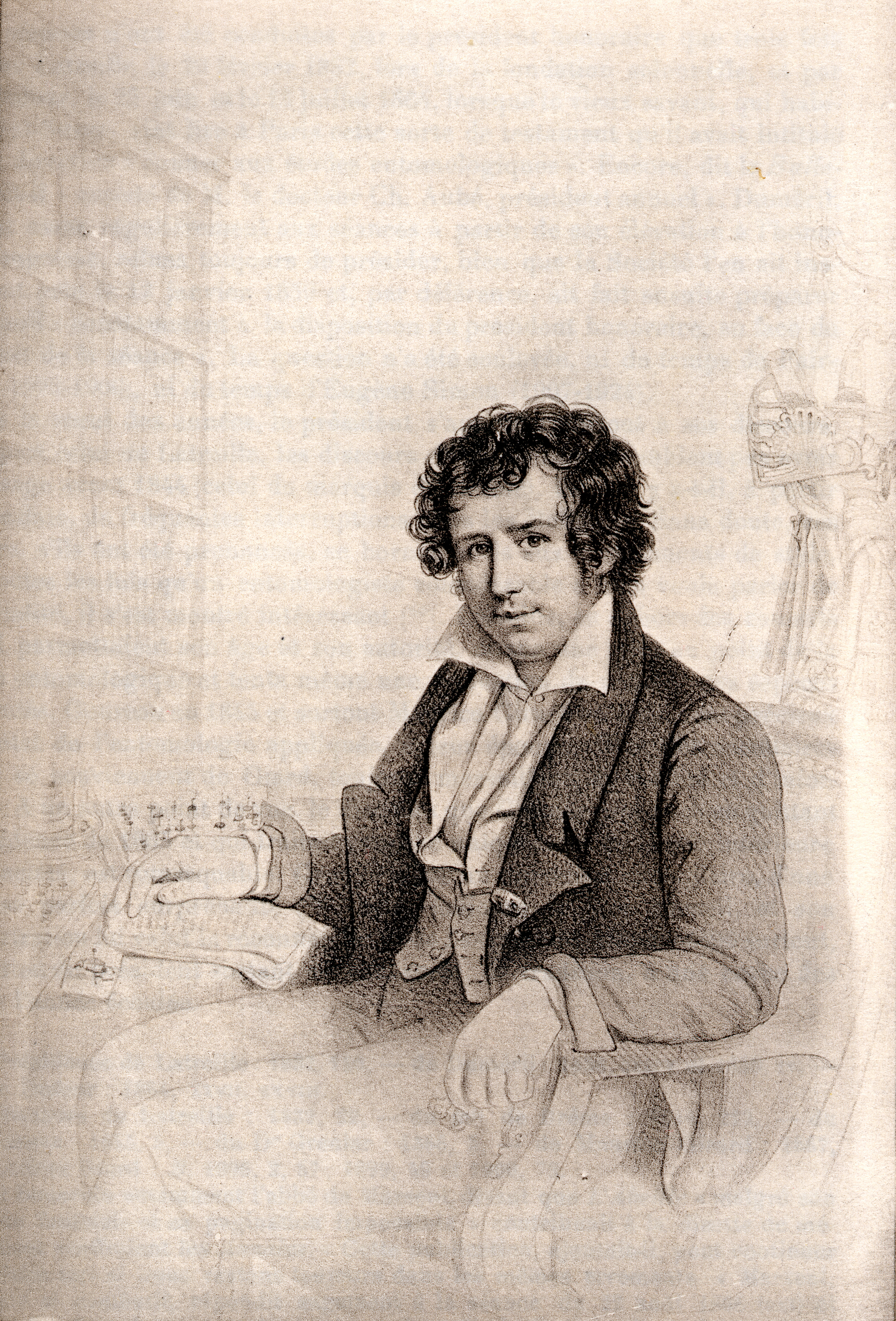
- Comte Dejean
- Born: 10 August 1780; Amiens
- Died: 17 March 1845 (aged 64); Paris
- Burial place: Père Lachaise Cemetery
- Military career
- Allegiance: France
- Branch: Cavalry
- Service years: 1795-1845
- Rank: General de division
- Conflicts: French Revolutionary Wars; Napoleonic Wars
- Awards: Grand Cross of the Legion of Honour; Knight of Saint Louis
- Scientific career
- Fields: Entomology
- Workplaces: Société entomologique de France; Royal Swedish Academy of Sciences

Pierre François Marie Auguste Dejean (French pronunciation: [pjɛʁ fʁɑ̃swa maʁi oɡyst dəʒɑ̃]; 10 August 1780 – 17 March 1845), was a French soldier and entomologist. Dejean described a large number of beetles in a series of catalogues.

== Origins and early career ==
Dejean was born in Amiens on 10 August 1780, the only child of Jean François Aimé Dejean then a captain in the engineers, and his first wife Alexandrine-Marie-Elisabeth Le Boucher d’Ailly. By the age of 13 he had already begun his lifelong interest in entomology, collecting Lepidoptera specimens with André Marie Constant Duméril, a childhood friend six years his senior. One summer they were joined in this endeavour by Philogène Auguste Joseph Duponchel, and the three became lifelong friends. In March 1795, with the War of the First Coalition raging, he followed his father into a military career.

Dejean's father was, at that point, Inspector General of Fortifications for the Army of Sambre and Meuse and took on his 14-year-old son as an unofficial aide-de-camp. A commission as a second lieutenant in the infantry came on 5 August 1796, and as lieutenant a year later. Throughout this period he continued to work as his father's aide as the latter took command of the Army of the North. It was during his time in the Army of the North that he abandoned the collection of butterflies, turning to the study of beetles that would become the main passion of his life.

September 1797 saw a reversal in Dejean's fortunes as his father was ousted from command over his refusal to back the Coup of 18 Fructidor. He managed to retain postings in the 8th Demi-brigade and then the 28th Line until his father once again came into favour with the establishment of the Consulate and became a Councillor of State. Called from his regiment to once again become his father's aide, he did so in Italy following the Marengo campaign and back in Paris when his father became Minister for the Administration of War. Finally, he transferred to the cavalry becoming a captain in the 20th Dragoons on 3 October 1803.

Throughout this period, Dejean continued to collect coleoptera specimens, and produced the first (unpublished) catalogue of his collection in the latter part of 1802, listing just over 900 species of beetle.

== Napoleonic Wars ==
At the start of the War of the Third Coalition, Dejean was a newly-promoted chef d'escadron in the 3rd Dragoons and part of the Grande Armée marching against Austria. He fought at Schöngrabern and at Austerlitz. He continued in the war against Prussia and Russia the following year, fighting at Jena, Prenzlau and Lübeck. In Poland, he fought at Pułtusk and took part in Murat's great charge at the battle of Eylau. On 13 February 1807, he was promoted to colonel of the 11th dragoons, replacing a man killed at Eylau. In this role he served with distinction as part of Grouchy's cavalry force at Friedland. At the end of the campaign he was made an officer of the Legion of Honour, and later granted a 10,000 franc endowment from the department of Trasimene. Whilst in command, Dejean distributed small bottles to his soldiers so they could collect beetles for him.

On 1 June 1808, Dejean was made a Baron of the Empire. That year his regiment joined the Peninsular War in Spain, initially as part of Kellermann's division, and spent two years in the cavalry reserve at Valladolid including fighting at the battle of Alba de Tormes. In 1810, he was part of Masséna's invasion of Portugal, fighting at Bussaco and Fuentes de Oñoro. At the start of a day's fighting at Alcañices, Dejean spotted a Cebrio beetle perched on a flower. He dismounted and pinned the specimen to the inside of his helmet, which he had lined with cork for that purpose. At the end of the fight he was happy to discover the specimen intact, despite the helmet being battered by cannon fire. He named the species Cebrio ustulatus (meaning fire-damaged). On 6 August 1811 he was promoted to general de brigade.

The newly minted General Dejean crossed Europe to take command of a cuirassier brigade in Nansouty's I Cavalry Corps for the French invasion of Russia. He fought at Saltanovka and on the right wing at the battle of Borodino, surviving the retreat from Moscow to briefly lead a brigade of Polish lancers in February 1813 before returning to Paris.

Possibly as a result of his father's influence, Dejean was appointed aide de camp to Napoleon on 20 February 1813. He accompanied the Emperor throughout the Spring phase of the German campaign of 1813, being present at the battles of Lützen and Bautzen. On 6 August he took command of the 1st Brigade of the Guard Light Cavalry division, leading it in the battles of Dresden and Leipzig. At the end of the year he was sent to Huningue, an important Rhine crossing, to strengthen its defences. In January 1814, he was responsible for organising the Levée en masse in Lorraine and Meurthe before rejoining the army in Champagne and fighting at the battle of Montereau. He was promoted to General de division on 23 March 1814, and sent to Paris to stiffen the resolve of Joseph Bonaparte. He arrived too late to prevent the capitulation of the city.

After Napoleon's abdication, the returning Bourbons confirmed Dejean's promotion and made him a Knight of Saint Louis. Nonetheless, when Napoleon returned at the beginning of the Hundred Days, Dejean rallied to his side. Serving once more as the Emperor's aide, Dejean fought at the battles of Ligny and Waterloo. According to the labels in his collection, he still found time to pick up more specimens in these last battles.

== Scientific career ==
Dejean was one of 38 individuals banished from the country as a result of the second Bourbon Restoration in France. He spent his exile collecting beetles in the Austrian empire, visiting Carinthia, Carniola, Croatia and Dalmatia, travelling on foot and accompanied by a single servant. He was about to move on to Hungary when, in 1818, his father secured a pardon from Louis XVIII allowing him to return to France.

With no prospect of resuming his military career, Dejean focused on scientific endeavours, spending the next three years organizing his collection and publishing a catalogue of it which listed 6692 species. This catalogue, together with its later editions, was destined to become the coleopterists' "bible" for fifty years. He funded expeditions to places including Colombia and Mauritius, and his ever-growing collection incorporated specimens from as far afield as California and Australia.

In 1821, Dejean began work with Pierre André Latreille on l’Histoire naturelle et iconographique des Coléoptères d’Europe, intended to describe and illustrate every species of beetle in Europe. This massive undertaking was abandoned after three years had passed and three installments had been published. Dejean's father died in 1824 and he inherited the title of Comte, taking his seat in the Chamber of Peers on 14 June 1824 and voting with the liberal minority.

In 1825 Dejean began work on an even more ambitious publication, a Species général des Coléoptères. His intention was to cover the world's beetles in twenty volumes, but eventually only six were published - the last being produced by Charles Aubé in 1838. Dejean was an opponent of the Principle of Priority in nomenclature. "I have made it a rule always to preserve the name most generally used, and not the oldest one; because it seems to me that general usage should always be followed and that it is harmful to change what has already been established". Dejean acted accordingly and often introduced in litteris names, given by himself to replace those already published by other authors. As Carl H. Lindroth would write, "a commanding general was not likely to allow simple privates to act up!"

The July Revolution in 1830 brought about a rehabilitation of Dejean's military career. He commanded a cavalry division in the army sent to support the Belgian Revolution, and served at the siege of Antwerp in 1832. This was his last service under enemy fire, but for the rest of his life he would hold posts as commandant or inspector general of cavalry in one military region or another.

As always, Dejean did not allow his military duties to get in the way of his scientific endeavours. In 1828 he had resumed the project that he had started with Latreille, and with the help of Aubé and Jean Baptiste Boisduval he completed five lavishly illustrated volumes of Iconographie et histoire naturelle des Coléoptères d’Europe by 1840. Between 1833 and 1836 he produced a new catalogue of his collection, also in five volumes. On 12 December 1835, a fire destroyed the unsold stock of this work and the publisher asked him to republish a revised version of the lost volumes. As a result, a revised and expanded version of the catalogue was published in 1836 and 1837. This last catalogue listed 22,399 species of Coleoptera — at the time, the greatest collection of in the world.

== Last years ==
In 1837, Dejean, his eyesight failing and funds running short, began talking about selling his huge collection. He negotiated a sale to the French government for 60,000 francs that would put it in the Jardin des Plantes in Paris, but the deal fell through. An offer from Frederick William III of Prussia to buy it for the Berlin museum was patriotically refused, and the collection was split up into smaller lots for sale to collectors across Europe.

Dejean belatedly joined the Société entomologique de France in 1837, and served as its President for the year 1840. On 14 April 1844 he was awarded the Grand Cross of the Legion of Honour. After an eleven month illness, he died on 17 March 1845 (aged 64), and was buried in Père Lachaise Cemetery. His name appears on the south pillar of the Arc de Triomphe.

== Family ==
Dejean married Adèle Barthélemy (d. 1872) on 17 July 1802, the couple had five children:

- Adèle Jeanne (1803–1860), married M. Ardènc
- Benjamin Barthélemy (1804–1885), Prefect, Director of Police, Councillor of State, Deputy for Aude
- Pierre Charles (1807–1872) General, Councillor of State, interim Minister for War
- Dieudonné Marie Louis (1809–1881), baron Dejean, lieutenant-colonel
- Stéphanie Emma Élisabeth (1815–1878), married Jacques-Alphonse Mahul

== Works ==
- Catalogue des Coléoptères de la collection d'Auguste Dejean (1802)
- Catalogue de la collection de Coléoptères de M. le Baron Dejean (1821)
- Catalogue des Coléoptères de la collection de M. le Comte Dejean (1833–1836)
- Catalogue des Coléoptères de la collection de M. le Comte Dejean. Troisième édition, revue, corrigée et augmentée. (1836–1837)
- with Pierre André Latreille Histoire naturelle et iconographie des insectes coléoptères d'Europe Paris : Crevot, 1822. digitised at Gallica.
- Spécies Général des Coléoptères, de la collection de M. le Comte Dejean (1825–1838)
