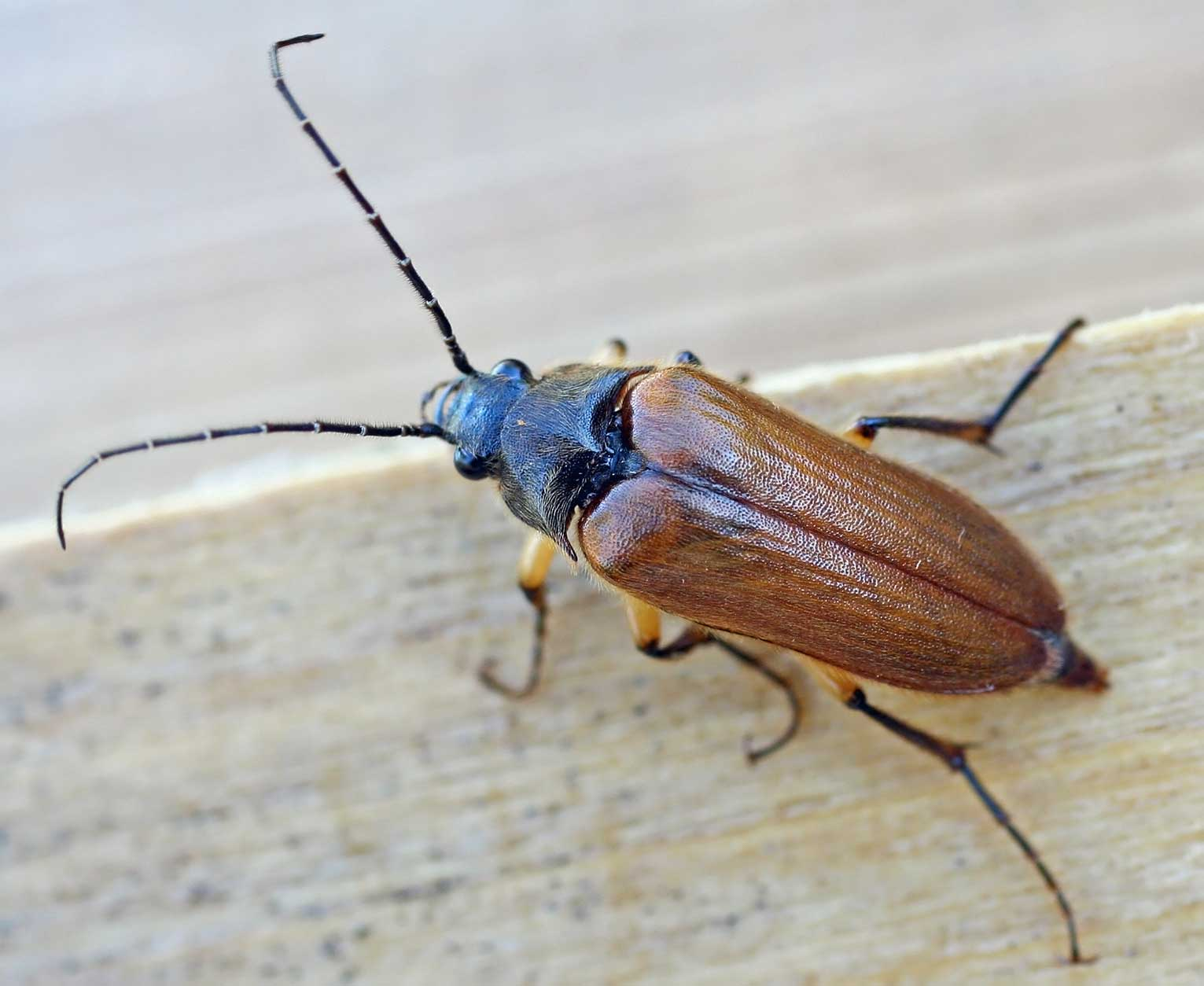

Scientific classification
- Kingdom: Animalia
- Phylum: Arthropoda
- Clade: Pancrustacea
- Class: Insecta
- Order: Coleoptera
- Suborder: Polyphaga
- Infraorder: Elateriformia
- Family: Elateridae
- Genus: Cebrio
- Species: C. gigas

Binomial name
- Cebrio gigas (Fabricius, 1787)

Synonyms
- Cistela gigas Fabricius, 1787; Cebrio longicornis Olivier, 1790; Cebrio latreillei Leach, 1824; Cebrio promelus Leach, 1824

= Cebrio gigas =

Species of beetle

Cebrio gigas is a species of beetle of the subfamily Cebrioninae from a family of click beetles. Extended in Europe (in the south France, north-east of Spain, in some places in the continental Italy and Sicily).

Head, and prothorax black with blue shiny sheen. Antenna long 11-segmented, with short erect hairs. Head, pronotum, and elytron are covered with light surrounding hairs. Posterior angles of pronotum drawn out into long, brownish tongue. Elytra brown. Legs and feet are black; leg pale yellow.
