= Poecilanthe ovalifolia =

Conservation status
- Vulnerable (IUCN 2.3)

Scientific classification
- Kingdom: Plantae
- Clade: Tracheophytes
- Clade: Angiosperms
- Clade: Eudicots
- Clade: Rosids
- Order: Fabales
- Family: Fabaceae
- Subfamily: Faboideae
- Genus: Poecilanthe
- Species: P. ovalifolia

Binomial name
- Poecilanthe ovalifolia Kleinhoonte

Species of legume

Poecilanthe ovalifolia is a species of flowering plant in the family Fabaceae. It is found only in Suriname.
