= Coral bush (disambiguation) =

Coral bush may refer to various flowering plants:

- Ardisia crenata
- Ardisia japonica
- Jatropha multifida
- Templetonia retusa
- Cockspur coral bush (Erythrina crista-galli)
