= Brongniart =

Brongniart is the surname of a notable French family:

- Antoine-Louis Brongniart (1742–1804), chemist, younger brother of
- Alexandre-Théodore Brongniart (1739–1813), architect who gave his name to the Palais Brongniart, the former seat of the Paris Bourse, father of
- Alexandre Brongniart (1770–1847), mineralogist and naturalist, father of
- Adolphe-Théodore Brongniart (1801–76), botanist, father of
- Édouard-Charles Brongniart, painter and schools inspector, father of
- Charles Jules Edmée Brongniart (1859–1899), zoologist

== See also ==
- Brongniartia (disambiguation)
- Brongniartieae
