= C10H19NO =

The molecular formula C_{10}H_{19}NO (molar mass: 169.26 g/mol) may refer to:

- Lupinine
- Epilupinine
