= Harpalyce maisiana =

Conservation status
- Critically Endangered (IUCN 3.1)

Scientific classification
- Kingdom: Plantae
- Clade: Embryophytes
- Clade: Tracheophytes
- Clade: Angiosperms
- Clade: Eudicots
- Clade: Rosids
- Order: Fabales
- Family: Fabaceae
- Subfamily: Faboideae
- Genus: Harpalyce
- Species: H. maisiana

Binomial name
- Harpalyce maisiana León & Alain

Species of legume

Harpalyce maisiana is a species of flowering plant in the family Fabaceae. It is found only in Cuba.
