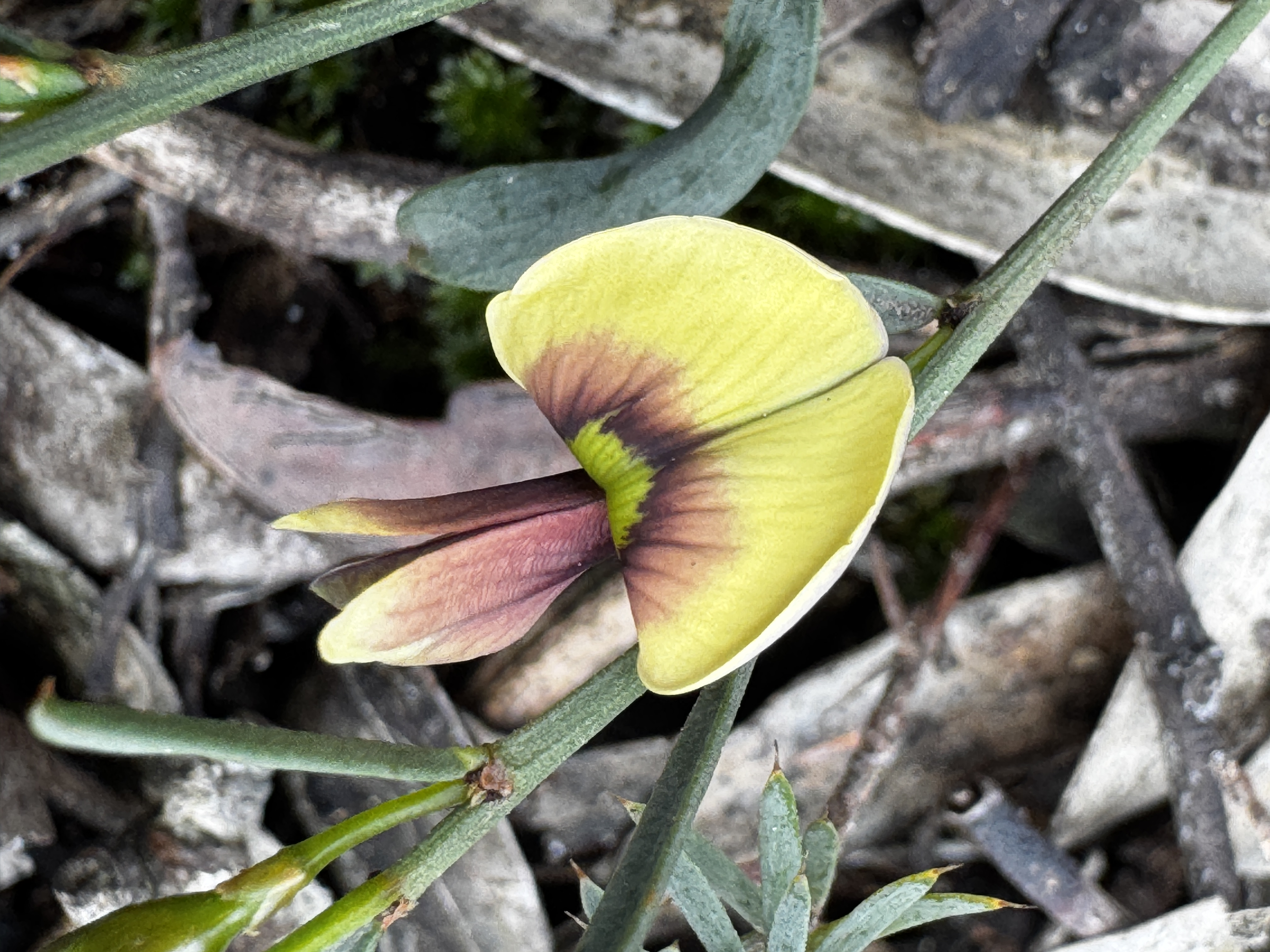

Scientific classification
- Kingdom: Plantae
- Clade: Tracheophytes
- Clade: Angiosperms
- Clade: Eudicots
- Clade: Rosids
- Order: Fabales
- Family: Fabaceae
- Subfamily: Faboideae
- Genus: Templetonia
- Species: T. stenophylla

Binomial name
- Templetonia stenophylla (F.Muell.) J.M.Black

Synonyms
- Bossiaea stenophylla F.Muell.; Templetonia muelleri Benth. nom. illeg. nom.superfl.

= Templetonia stenophylla =

Leafy templetonia

Species of plant

Templetonia stenophylla, commonly known as leafy templetonia, is a species of flowering plant in the family Fabaceae and is endemic to eastern Australia. It is a small straggling shrub with yellow flowers with plum-red centre markings.

== Description ==
Templetonia stenophylla is a small, straggling shrub to 30 cm (12 in) high. It has narrow-oblong to elliptic leaves, 1–7 cm (0.39–2.76 in) long with a small recurved tip. One or two flowers are borne in leaf axils, 10–12 mm (0.39–0.47 in) long, pale yellow petals with plum-red centre markings, pedicels 4–8 mm (0.16–0.31 in) long. Flowering occurs in spring and the fruit is an oblong pod 15–20 mm (0.59–0.79 in) long.

== Naming and taxonomy ==
This species was first formally described in March 1858 by Ferdinand von Mueller who gave it the name Bossiaea stenophylla in his Fragmenta Phytographiae Australiae from a specimen collected by M. Weidenbach of specimens collected near Milton near Port Phillip. In 1924, J.M.Black changed the name to Templetonia stenophylla in the Flora of South Australia.

== Distribution and habitat ==
Templetonia stenophylla has a wide distribution, mostly in dry sclerophyll forest. In New South Wales it often grows on river banks.
