= Tabaroa =

Scientific classification
- Kingdom: Plantae
- Clade: Tracheophytes
- Clade: Angiosperms
- Clade: Eudicots
- Clade: Rosids
- Order: Fabales
- Family: Fabaceae
- Subfamily: Faboideae
- Tribe: Brongniartieae
- Genus: Tabaroa; L.P.Queiroz, G.P.Lewis & M.F.Wojc.
- Species: T. caatingicola

Binomial name
- Tabaroa caatingicola L.P.Queiroz, G.P.Lewis & M.F.Wojc.

Genus of legumes

Tabaroa caatingicola is a species of legume found in the Caatinga of Bahia state, Brazil. It is the only member of the genus Tabaroa.
