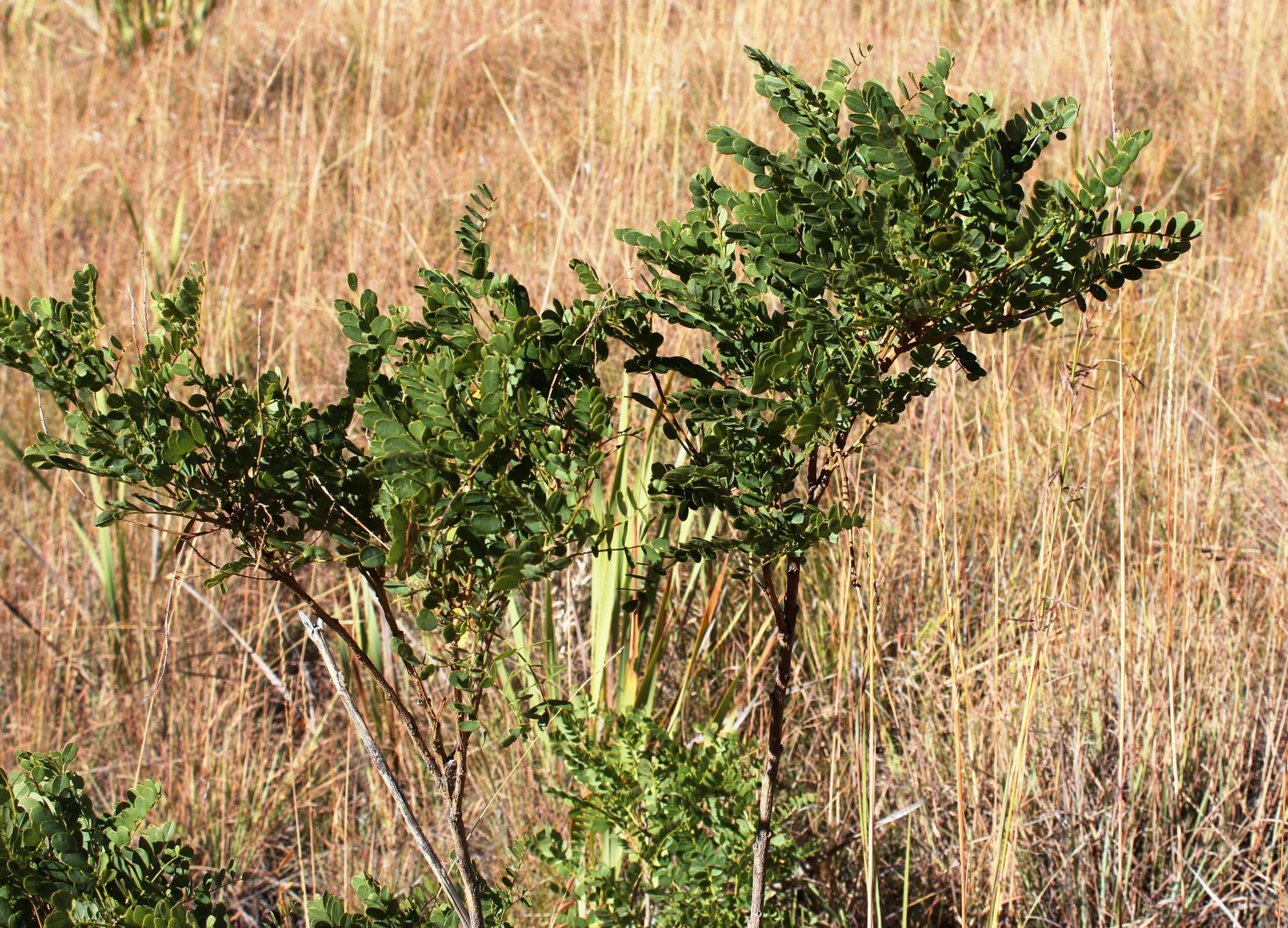

Scientific classification
- Kingdom: Plantae
- Clade: Tracheophytes
- Clade: Angiosperms
- Clade: Eudicots
- Clade: Rosids
- Order: Fabales
- Family: Fabaceae
- Subfamily: Faboideae
- Genus: Calpurnia
- Species: C. reflexa

Binomial name
- Calpurnia reflexa A.J.Beaumont

= Calpurnia reflexa =

Species of plant

Calpurnia reflexa, also known as the Free State golden-pea or Sotho laburnum, is a plant species in the Fabaceae family.
