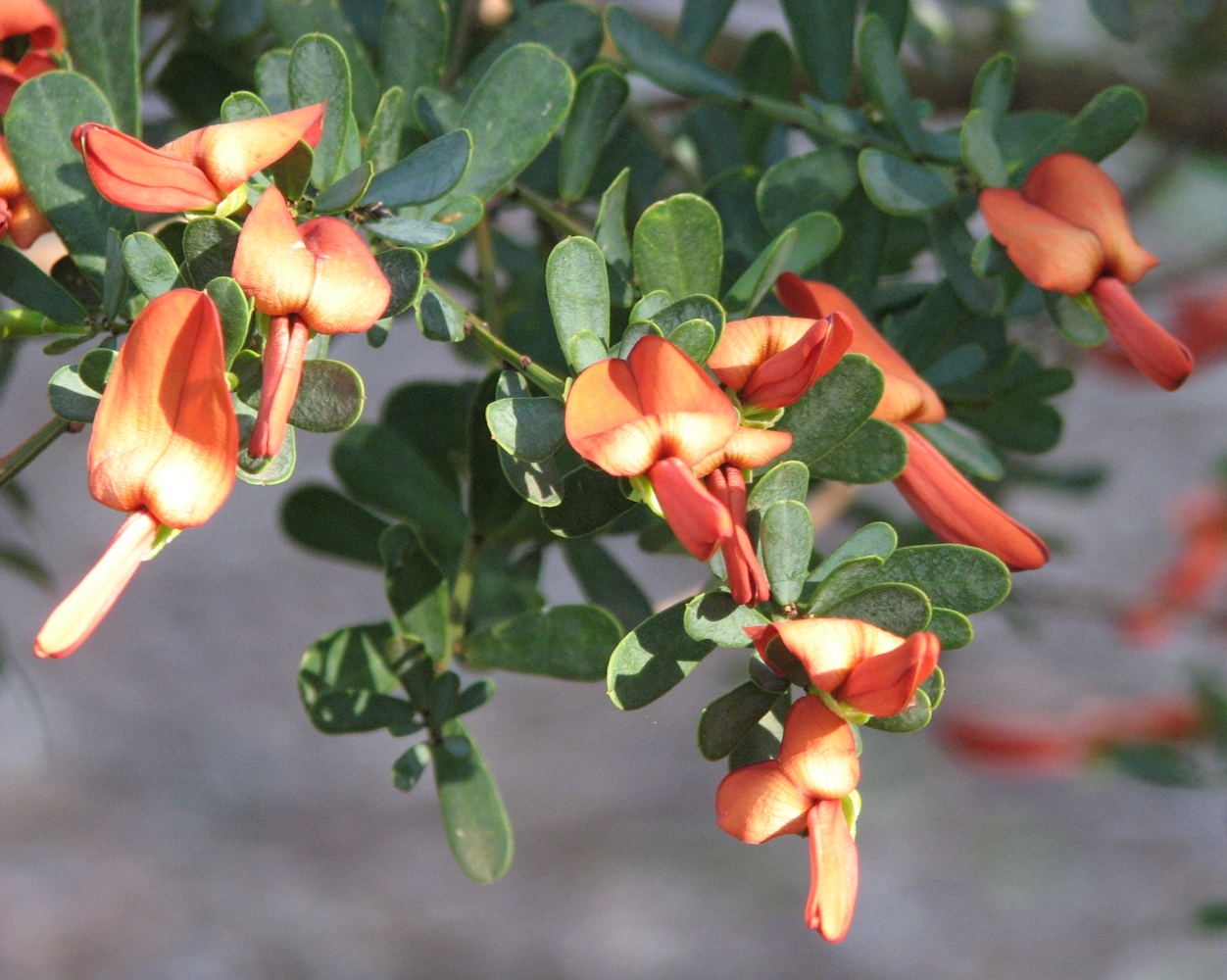
- Templetonia retusa

Scientific classification
- Kingdom: Plantae
- Clade: Tracheophytes
- Clade: Angiosperms
- Clade: Eudicots
- Clade: Rosids
- Order: Fabales
- Family: Fabaceae
- Subfamily: Faboideae
- Tribe: Brongniartieae
- Genus: Templetonia; R.Br. (1812)

Type species
- Templetonia retusa R.Br.

Species
- See text
- Range of Templetonia

Synonyms
- Nematophyllum F.Muell. (1857)

= Templetonia =

Genus of legumes

Templetonia is a genus of flowering plants in the family Fabaceae. They are native to Australia. The genus is named in honour of John Templeton, an Irish naturalist and botanist.

== Species ==
Templetonia comprises the following species:

- Templetonia aculeata (F. Muell.) Benth.
- Templetonia battii F. Muell.
- Templetonia ceracea I.Thomps.
- Templetonia drummondii Benth.
- Templetonia egena (F. Muell.) Benth. – round templetonia
- Templetonia hookeri (F. Muell.) Benth.
- Templetonia incrassata I.Thomps.
- Templetonia neglecta J.H. Ross
- Templetonia retusa (Vent.) R. Br. – cockies tongues
- Templetonia rossii (F.Muell.) I.Thomps.
- Templetonia smithiana J.H. Ross
- Templetonia stenophylla (F. Muell.) J.M. Black – leafy templetonia
- Templetonia sulcata (Meissner) Benth. – centipede bush
