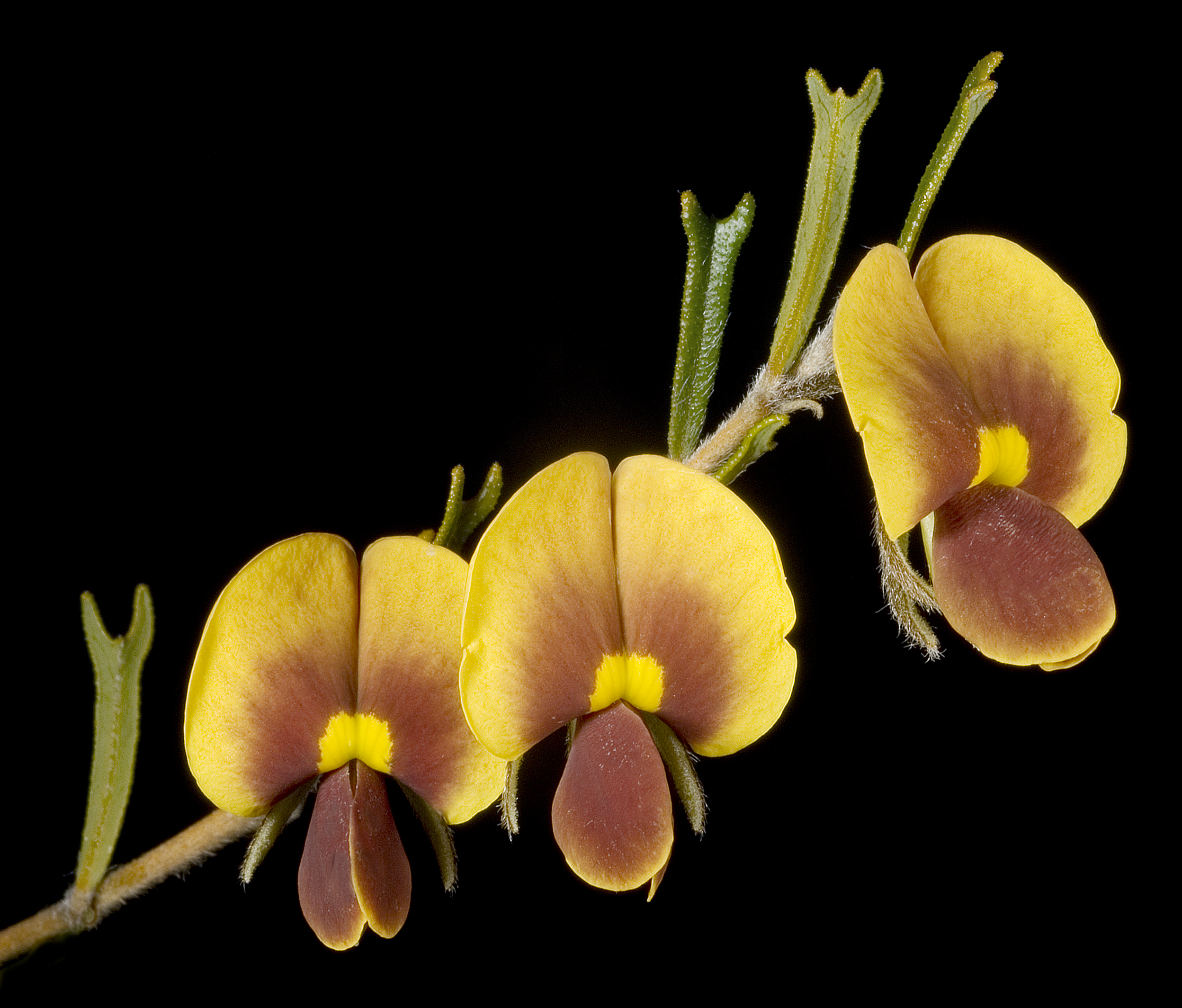
- Cristonia biloba

Scientific classification
- Kingdom: Plantae
- Clade: Tracheophytes
- Clade: Angiosperms
- Clade: Eudicots
- Clade: Rosids
- Order: Fabales
- Family: Fabaceae
- Subfamily: Faboideae
- Tribe: Brongniartieae
- Genus: Cristonia; J.H.Ross (2001)

Species
- Cristonia biloba (Benth.) J.H.Ross; subsp. biloba (Benth.) J.H.Ross; subsp. pubescens I.Thomps.; Cristonia stenophylla (Meisn.) I.Thomps.

= Cristonia =

Genus of legumes

Cristonia is a genus of flowering plants in the family Fabaceae. It includes two species native to Southwest Australia.
