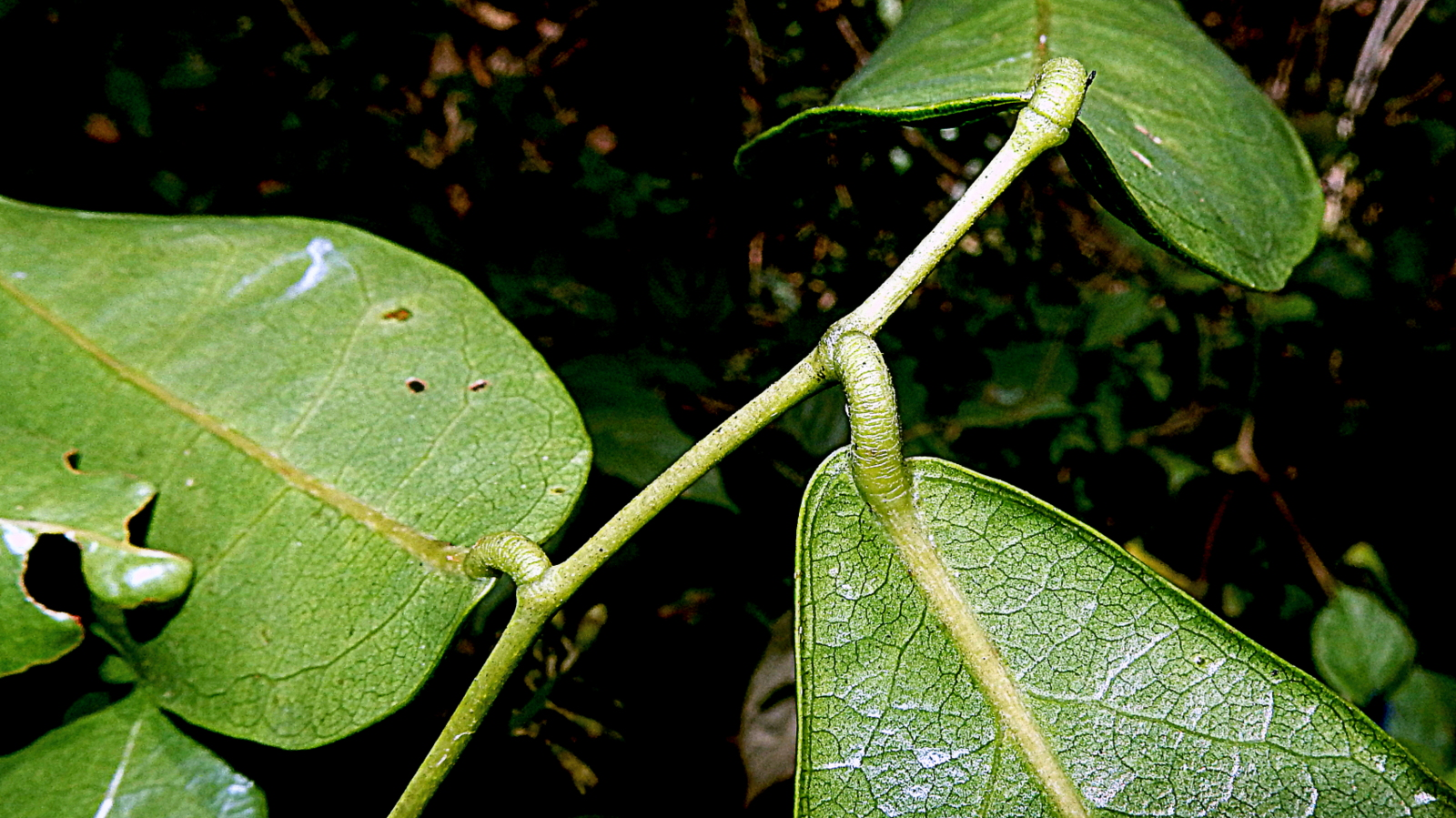
- Poecilanthe falcata

Scientific classification
- Kingdom: Plantae
- Clade: Tracheophytes
- Clade: Angiosperms
- Clade: Eudicots
- Clade: Rosids
- Order: Fabales
- Family: Fabaceae
- Subfamily: Faboideae
- Tribe: Brongniartieae
- Genus: Poecilanthe; Benth. (1860)

Species
- 9; see text

= Poecilanthe =

Genus of legumes

Poecilanthe is a genus of flowering plants in the family Fabaceae. It includes 9 species of trees and shrubs native to eastern, southern, and west-central Brazil, Bolivia, Paraguay, Uruguay, and northeastern Argentina. They grow in seasonally-dry tropical forest, woodland, thicket, and riverine forest.

Several Amazonian species formerly classed in Poelicanthe were reclassified into the new genera Amphiodon and Limadendron based on a 2014 molecular and morphogenetic analysis.

== Species ==
Poecilanthe comprises the following species:

- Poecilanthe boliviana G.P.Lewis
- Poecilanthe falcata (Vell.) Heringer
- Poecilanthe fluminensis Meireles & H.C.Lima
- Poecilanthe goiasana G.P.Lewis
- Poecilanthe grandiflora Benth.
- Poecilanthe itapuana G.P.Lewis
- Poecilanthe parviflora Benth.
- Poecilanthe subcordata Benth.
- Poecilanthe ulei (Harms) Arroyo & Rudd
