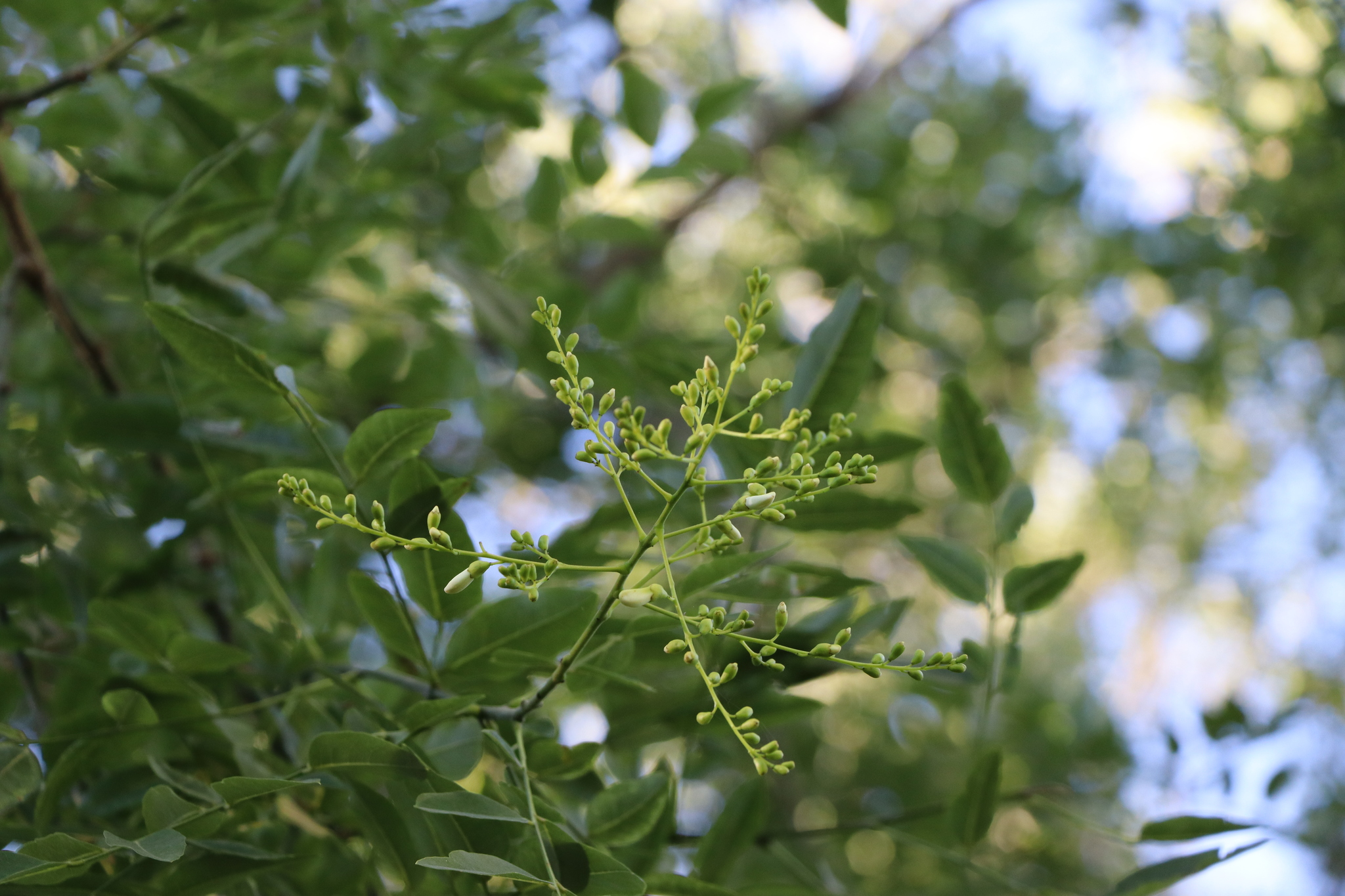

Conservation status
- Data Deficient (IUCN 2.3)

Scientific classification
- Kingdom: Plantae
- Clade: Tracheophytes
- Clade: Angiosperms
- Clade: Eudicots
- Clade: Rosids
- Order: Fabales
- Family: Fabaceae
- Subfamily: Faboideae
- Genus: Poecilanthe
- Species: P. parviflora

Binomial name
- Poecilanthe parviflora Bentham.

= Poecilanthe parviflora =

Species of legume

Poecilanthe parviflora, the lapachillo, is a species of flowering plant in the family Fabaceae. It is found in Argentina and Brazil.
