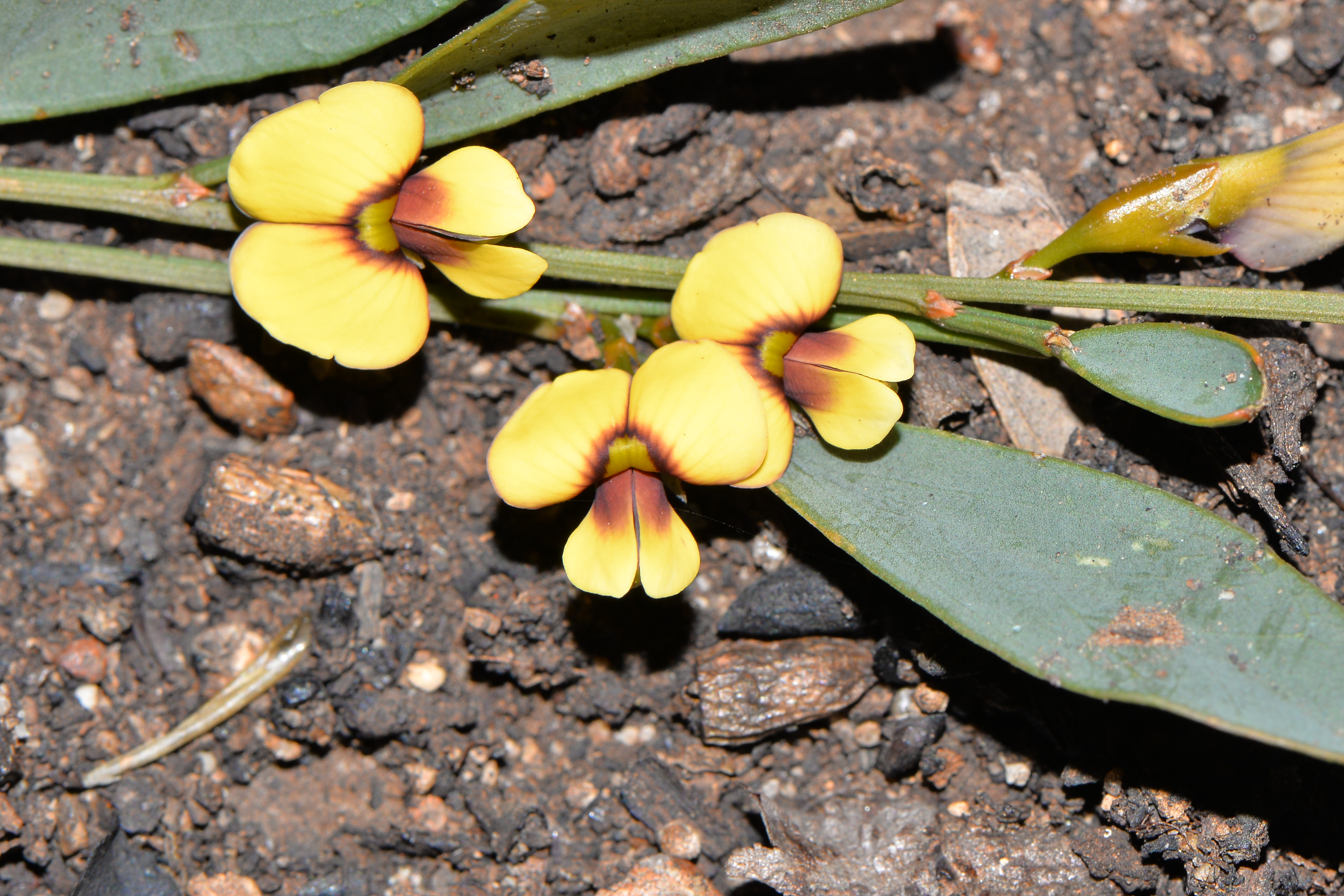

Scientific classification
- Kingdom: Plantae
- Clade: Tracheophytes
- Clade: Angiosperms
- Clade: Eudicots
- Clade: Rosids
- Order: Fabales
- Family: Fabaceae
- Subfamily: Faboideae
- Genus: Templetonia
- Species: T. drummondii

Binomial name
- Templetonia drummondii Benth.

= Templetonia drummondii =

Species of plant

Templetonia drummondii is a flowering plant in the family Fabaceae and is endemic to Western Australia. It is an upright, broom-like shrub with mostly yellow pea flowers.

== Description ==
Templetonia drummondii is a small glabrous understory shrub with numerous prostrate stems up to 30 cm (12 in) long, stems with parallel ridges and more or less terete. Leaves have dense hairs in leaf axils, petiole up to 5 mm (0.20 in) long, lower leaves oval to almost egg-shaped, upper leaves larger, glabrous, pointed at the apex and veined on the lower surface The flowers are borne singly in leaf axils on pedicels up to 7.5 mm (0.30 in) long, upper lobes joined, lowest lobe longer, brownish or purple yellow, wings up to 10.5 mm (0.41 in) long. Flowering occurs from August to September and the fruit is a pod 1.8–2.8 cm (0.71–1.10 in) long and 0.85–1 cm (0.33–0.39 in) wide.

== Taxonomy and naming ==
Templetonia drummondii was first formally described in 1864 by George Bentham and the description was published in Flora Australiensis. The specific epithet (drummondii) is in honour of James Drummond.

== Distribution and habitat ==
This species grows on lateritic soils and is endemic to Western Australia.
