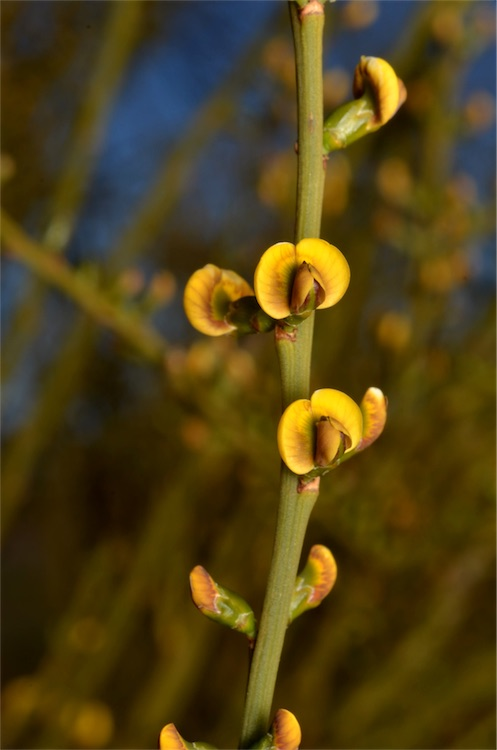

Scientific classification
- Kingdom: Plantae
- Clade: Tracheophytes
- Clade: Angiosperms
- Clade: Eudicots
- Clade: Rosids
- Order: Fabales
- Family: Fabaceae
- Subfamily: Faboideae
- Genus: Templetonia
- Species: T. egena

Binomial name
- Templetonia egena (F.Muell.) Benth.

Synonyms
- List: Bossiaea egena (F.Muell.) Hook.; Daviesia egena F.Muell. nom. inval., nom. nud.; Daviesia egena F.Muell.; Daviesia egena F.Muell. isonym

= Templetonia egena =

Desert broom bush

Species of plant

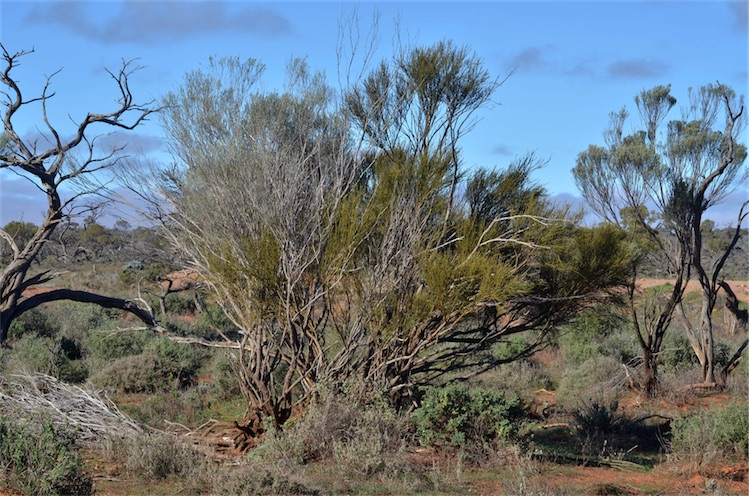
Habit in the Gawler Ranges

Templetonia egena commonly known as desert broom bush, is a flowering plant in the family Fabaceae. It is an upright, leafless shrub with yellowish-brown pea-like flowers and grows in all mainland states and the Northern Territory in Australia.

== Description ==
Templetonia egena is a multi-branched shrub 1–3 m (3 ft 3 in – 9 ft 10 in) high with ridged, upright, yellow-green stems 1–3 mm (0.039–0.118 in) wide, rounded at the apex, leaves small, triangular scales. Flowers are borne in pairs or singly in leaf axils, 6–9 mm (0.24–0.35 in) long, pea-like, thickly racemose, pedicel less than 1 mm (0.039 in) long and petals yellow or reddish brown. Flowering occurs mostly in spring and the fruit is a flattened, oval to oblong pod 10–20 mm (0.39–0.79 in) long and usually one-seeded.

== Taxonomy and naming ==
In 1855 the species was named by Ferdinand von Mueller and gave it the name Daviesia egena. In 1864 George Bentham changed the name to Templetonia egena and the change was published in Flora Australiensis. The specific epithet (egena) means "small scales" in reference to the leaves.

== Distribution and habitat ==
Desert broom bush grows on deep sandy soils in drier locations in Victoria, South Australia, New South Wales, Queensland, Western Australia and the Northern Territory.
