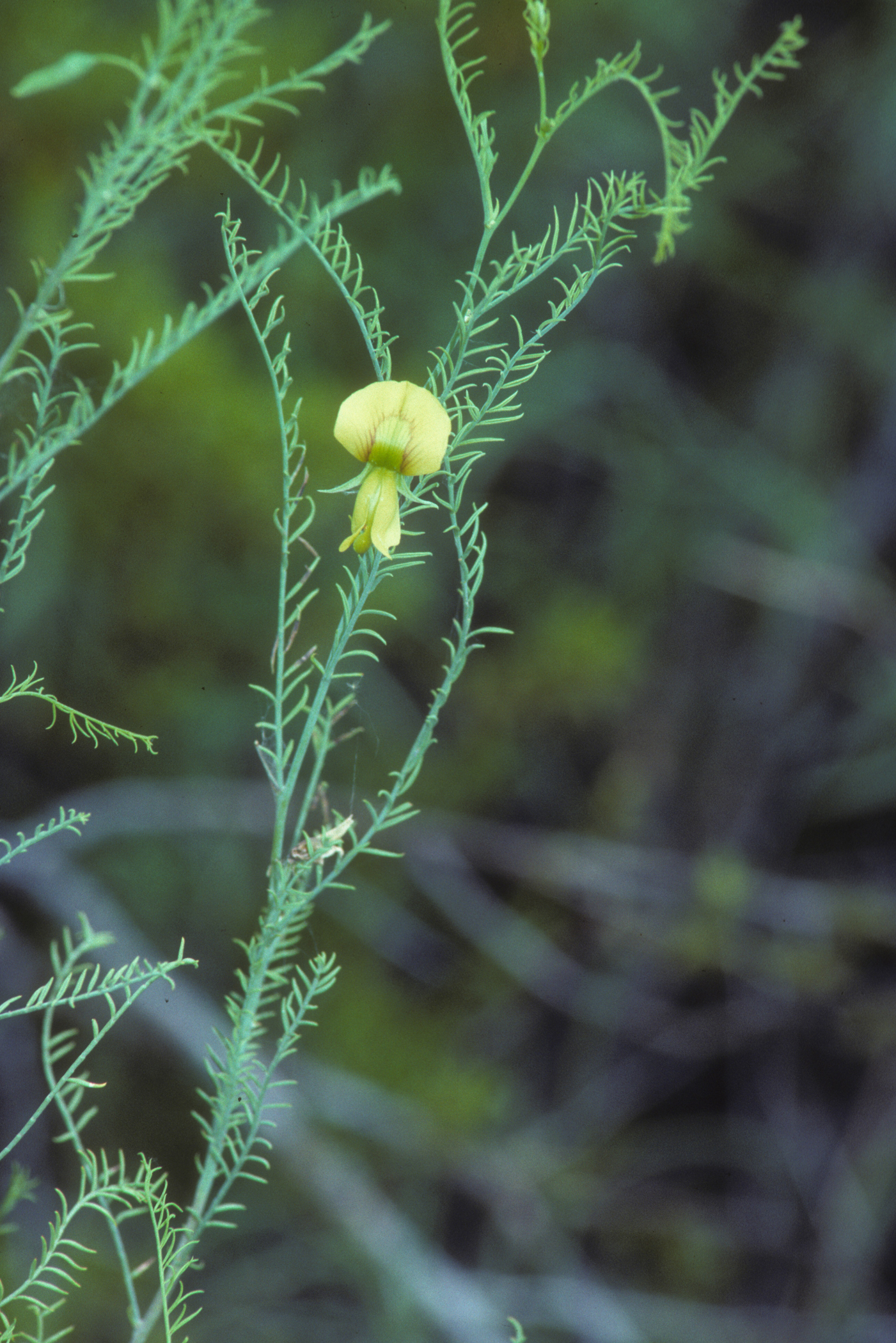
- Brongniartia minutifolia

Scientific classification
- Kingdom: Plantae
- Clade: Tracheophytes
- Clade: Angiosperms
- Clade: Eudicots
- Clade: Rosids
- Order: Fabales
- Family: Fabaceae
- Subfamily: Faboideae
- Tribe: Brongniartieae
- Genus: Brongniartia; Kunth (1823)

Species
- 63; see text
- Range of Brongniartia

Synonyms
- Megastegia G.Don (1832); Peraltea Kunth (1824)

= Brongniartia =

Genus of legumes

Brongniartia is a genus of leguminous plants in family Fabaceae. It includes 63 species native to Mexico and Texas and to Bolivia. The genus was first named by Kunth after the French botanist Adolphe Brongniart.

== Species ==
Brongniartia comprises the following species:

- Brongniartia abbottiae I.M. Johnst.
- Brongniartia alamosana Rydb.
- Brongniartia argentea Rydb.
- Brongniartia argyrophylla McVaugh
- Brongniartia caeciliae Harms
- Brongniartia canescens (S. Watson) Rydb.
- Brongniartia cordata McVaugh
- Brongniartia cuneata L.B. Sm. & B.G. Schub.
- Brongniartia diffusa Rose
- Brongniartia discolor Brandegee
- Brongniartia foliolosa Hemsl.
- Brongniartia funiculata L.B. Sm. & B.G. Schub.
- Brongniartia glabrata Hook. & Arn.
- Brongniartia goldmanii Rose
- Brongniartia guerrerensis J. Jimenez Ram. & J.L. Contr.
- Brongniartia hirsuta Rydb.
- Brongniartia imitator McVaugh
- Brongniartia inconstans S. Watson
- Brongniartia intermedia Moric.
- Brongniartia luisana Brandegee
- Brongniartia lunata Rose
- Brongniartia lupinoides (Kunth) Taub.
- Brongniartia magnibracteata Schltdl.
- Brongniartia minima McVaugh
- Brongniartia minutifolia S. Watson
- Brongniartia mollicula Brandegee
- Brongniartia mollis Kunth
- Brongniartia mortonii McVaugh
- Brongniartia norrisii McVaugh
- Brongniartia nudiflora S. Watson
- Brongniartia oligosperma Baill.
- Brongniartia pacifica McVaugh
- Brongniartia paniculata Rydb.
- Brongniartia parvifolia Rose
- Brongniartia pauciflora Rydb.
- Brongniartia peninsularis Rose
- Brongniartia podalyrioides Kunth
- Brongniartia pringlei Rydb.
- Brongniartia proteranthera L.B. Sm. & B.G. Schub.
- Brongniartia revoluta Rose
- Brongniartia robinioides Kunth
- Brongniartia rozynskii Standl.
- Brongniartia seleri Harms
- Brongniartia sericea Schltdl.
- Brongniartia shrevei Wiggins
- Brongniartia sousae Dorado
- Brongniartia suberea Rose
- Brongniartia tenuifolia Standl.
- Brongniartia trifoliata Brandegee
- Brongniartia ulbrichiana Harms
- Brongniartia vazquezii Dorado
- Brongniartia vicioides M. Martens & Galeotti
