= Limadendron =

Scientific classification
- Kingdom: Plantae
- Clade: Tracheophytes
- Clade: Angiosperms
- Clade: Eudicots
- Clade: Rosids
- Order: Fabales
- Family: Fabaceae
- Subfamily: Faboideae
- Tribe: Brongniartieae
- Genus: Limadendron; Meireles & A.M.G.Azevedo (2014)

Species
- Limadendron amazonicum (Ducke) Meireles & A.M.G.Azevedo; Limadendron hostmannii (Benth.) Meireles & A.M.G.Azevedo
- The distribution of Limadendron.

Genus of legumes

Limadendron is a genus of small trees in the family Fabaceae. It includes two species native to northern South America, including Colombia, Venezuela, the Guianas, northern Brazil, and Peru. The genus was recently separated from the genus Poecilanthe. It belongs to the tribe Brongniartieae.
