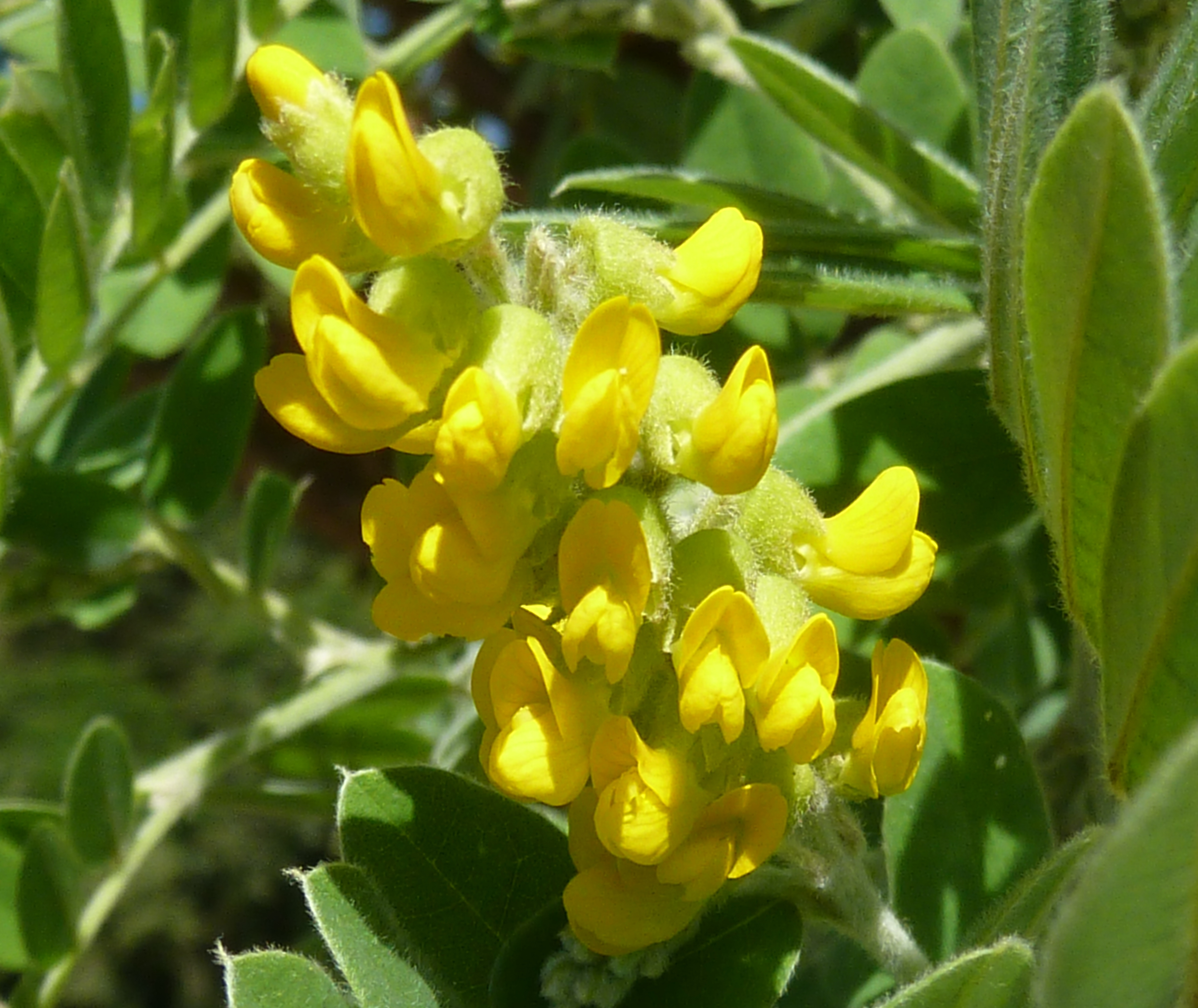
- Inflorescence of Calpurnia sericea
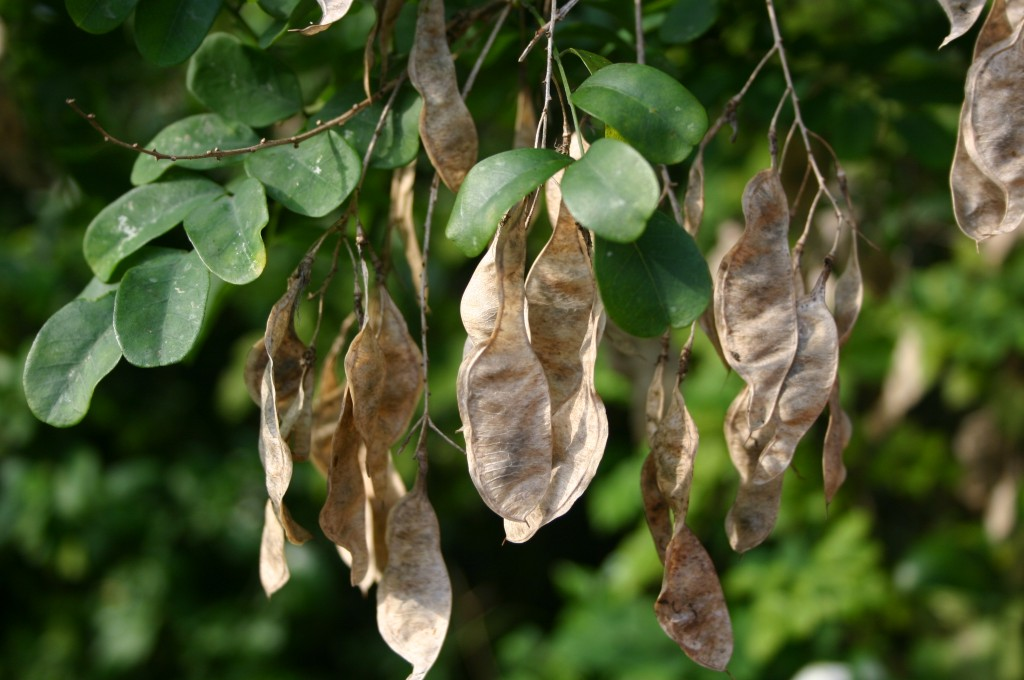
- Foliage and seed pods of Calpurnia aurea

Scientific classification
- Kingdom: Plantae
- Clade: Embryophytes
- Clade: Tracheophytes
- Clade: Spermatophytes
- Clade: Angiosperms
- Clade: Eudicots
- Clade: Rosids
- Order: Fabales
- Family: Fabaceae
- Subfamily: Faboideae
- Tribe: Podalyrieae
- Genus: Calpurnia; E.Mey. (1836)

Species
- 6; see text

= Calpurnia (plant) =

Genus of legumes

Calpurnia is a genus of flowering plants within the family Fabaceae. It includes six species which range through eastern, central, and southern Africa and in southern India. The genus comprises shrubs or small trees in or along the margin of forests in the eastern parts of South Africa. They shed leaves in winter unless in moist areas, where they are evergreen. They make good garden plants because they are easily raised from seed, flower at two years and withstand frost.

The species Calpurnia aurea is also known as Wild Laburnum or Wildegeelkeur (in Afrikaans). The bright yellow flowers have the typical form of the Fabaceae (pea family). They are borne in racemes and flowering can take place over several months. The flowers are visited by carpenter bees, after which the pollinated flowers turn into thin, straw-colored pods.

== Species ==
Calpurnia comprises the following species:

- Calpurnia aurea (Aiton) Benth. – Sudan to Angola and South Africa; southern India
  - subsp. aurea (Aiton) Benth.
  - subsp. indica Brummitt
- Calpurnia glabrata Brummitt – South Africa
- Calpurnia intrusa (R.Br.) E.Mey. – South Africa
- Calpurnia reflexa A.J.Beaumont – South Africa
- Calpurnia sericea Harv. – South Africa and Lesotho
- Calpurnia woodii Schinz – KwaZulu-Natal
