= Amphiodon =

Conservation status
- Least Concern (IUCN 3.1)

Scientific classification
- Kingdom: Plantae
- Clade: Tracheophytes
- Clade: Angiosperms
- Clade: Eudicots
- Clade: Rosids
- Order: Fabales
- Family: Fabaceae
- Subfamily: Faboideae
- Tribe: Brongniartieae
- Genus: Amphiodon; Huber
- Species: A. effusus

Binomial name
- Amphiodon effusus Huber (1909)

Synonyms
- Poecilanthe effusa (Huber) Ducke (1932); Poecilanthe ovalifolia Kleinhoonte (1925 publ. 1926)

Genus of legumes

Amphiodon effusus is a species of flowering plant in the family Fabaceae. It is a tree found in non-flooded areas of the Amazon rainforest. It is the only member of the genus Amphiodon.
