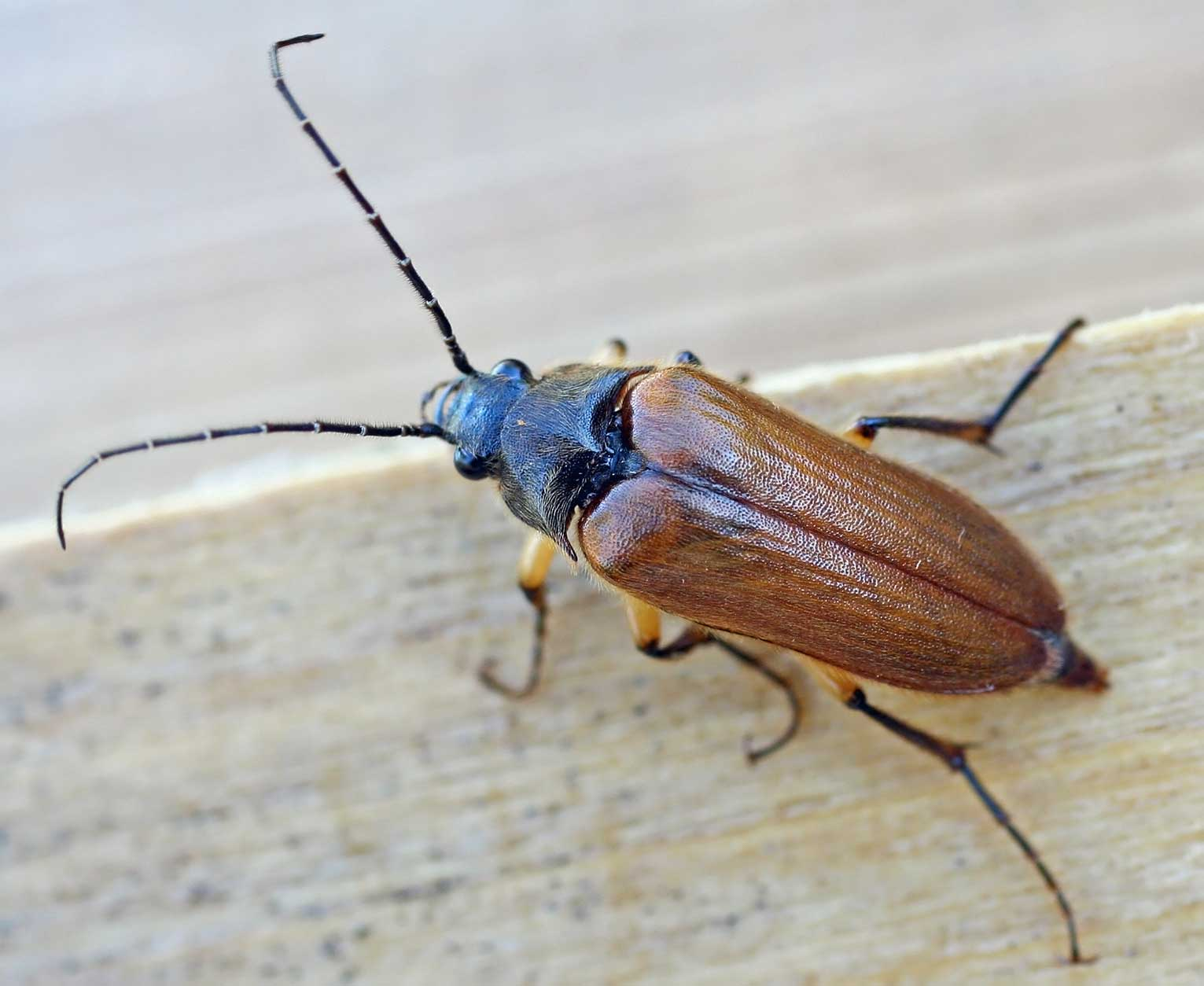
- Cebrio gigas

Scientific classification
- Kingdom: Animalia
- Phylum: Arthropoda
- Class: Insecta
- Order: Coleoptera
- Suborder: Polyphaga
- Infraorder: Elateriformia
- Family: Elateridae
- Subfamily: Elaterinae
- Tribe: Cebrionini

Genera
- Brongniartia; Cebrio; Cebriorhipis; Dumerilia; Euthysanius; Musopsis; Scaptolenus; Selonodon; Stenocebrio

= Cebrionini =

Tribe of beetles

Cebrionini is a tribe of click beetles from the family Elateridae; formerly ranked as a subfamily or family, they are now considered a tribe within the subfamily Elaterinae.

== Distribution ==
Cebrionines live in most parts of the world, but they are absent from Australia and New Zealand. They are particularly abundant in the more arid parts of the Holarctic Region, Nearctic, Palearctic, Neotropical, Afrotropical, and Oriental.

== Description ==
=== Biological ===
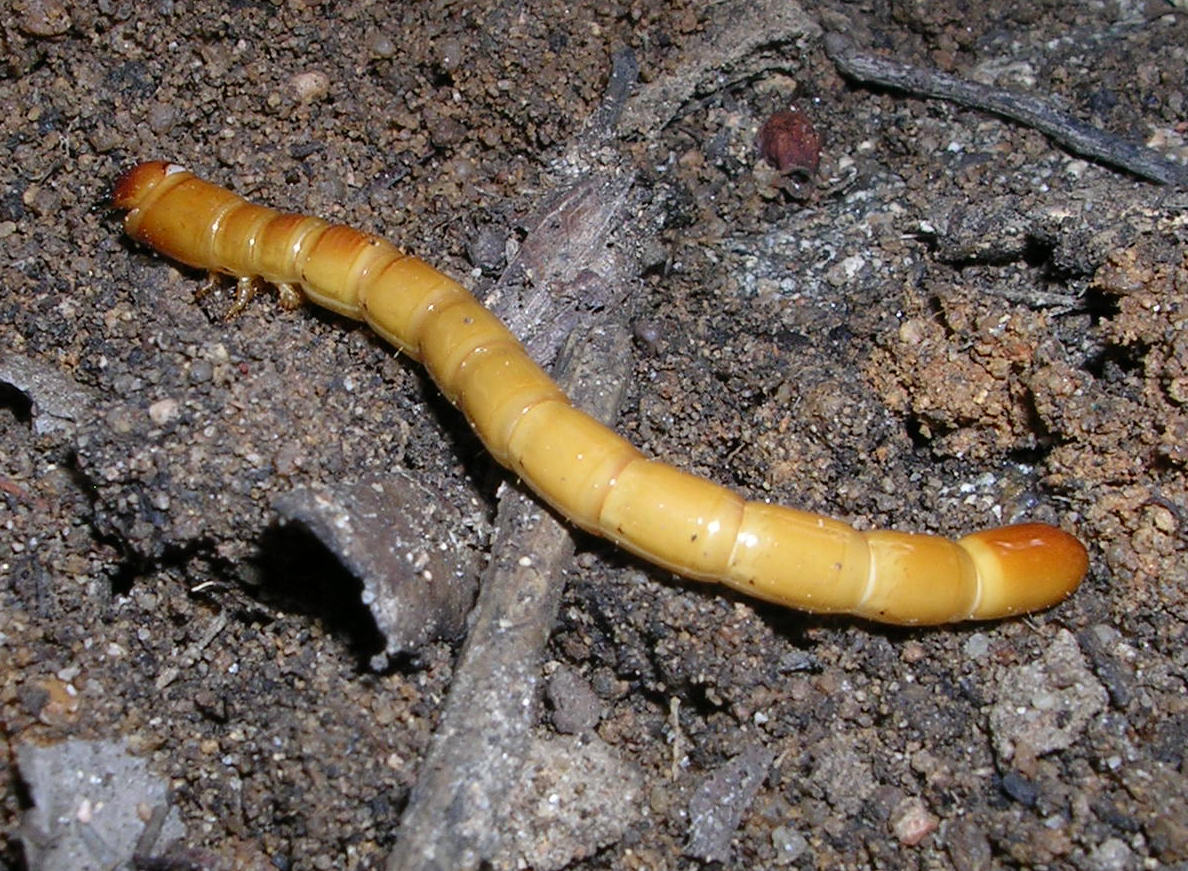
cebrionine larva

Male cebrionines fly at night and may be attracted to lights. In several genera, including Cebrio, Selonodon and Euthysanius, females are flightless, and other groups are known from males only. All known larvae live in the soil.

=== General ===
The species are 8–20 mm. in length. Ratio of body length to greatest body width 2.5–4.55. Body slightly flattened to moderately convex. Sides of body not evenly curved. Body not capable of conglobation (rolling into a ball). Upper surfaces of body clothed with distinct hairs, setae or scales. Vestiture of upper surfaces not including stiff, erect, dark bristles; not including scales or scale-like setae. Upper surfaces of body without deep foveae. Prothorax, metathorax and-or abdomen without extrusible glands. Underside of body without hydrofuge surface(s).

=== Head ===
Ratio of head length to its greatest width (excluding eyes) 1 or less. Head width just behind eyes not distinctly greater than prothoracic width. Head not or slightly declined, or moderately to strongly declined; not entirely concealed from above by pronotum; without elongate rostrum; not abruptly constricted posteriorly. Temples absent or not closely adpressed to prothorax; absent. Transverse occipital ridge or carina absent. Occiput without stridulatory file. Longitudinal axis of head (from occipital foramen to mouth cavity) inclined at an angle of less than 45 degrees, or inclined at an angle of 45 to 90 degrees. Frontal region not to moderately, gradually declined. Occipital region without median longitudinal groove or line (endocarina). Frontal region without median groove or line (endocarina). Head without ocelli.

=== Eyes ===
The eyes are strongly protuberant. Vertical diameter of an eye is less than 2 times horizontal diameter. The eyes finely facetted; without interfacetal setae. Ommatidium of the exocone type. Eye entire. Anterior or mesal edge of eye not or only barely emarginate. Posterior edge of eye not or barely emarginate. Antennal insertions exposed from above, or concealed from above; moderately to widely separated. Antennae not borne on raised tubercles. Subantennal groove or cavity on head absent or very weakly developed. Frontoclypeal suture absent or incomplete. Clypeus is not laterally emarginate. Anterior edge of clypeus or clypeolabrum straight to convex. Mouth cavity anteriorly or anteroventrally oriented. Pregular area without laterally opening cavities. Head ventrally without paired subgenal ridges, or with paired subgenal ridges. Head without anteriorly-projecting genal processes. Gular sutures widely separated or absent. Corporotentorium narrow; without median process. Cervical sclerites present.

=== Antennae ===
The species have either 11 or 12 antennomeres, dependinding on the gender. Antennae when posteriorly extended not reaching middle of prothorax, or reaching beyond middle of prothorax but not middle of elytra, or reaching beyond middle of elytra but not elytral apices. Antennae filiform, or moniliform, or serrate, or pectinate or bipectinate, or plumose or biplumose. Antennomeres 3, 4 or 5 to 10 without or with single rami (uniramose). Antennae at least partly pubescent or with obvious modifications. Antennal modifications beginning on antennomere 3 (rarely 2), or antennomere 4. First antennomere (scape) less than 3 times as long as 2nd (pedicel), or more than 3 times as long as 2nd (pedicel). Antenna is not geniculate; without apical club.

=== Mouthparts ===
Labrum is at least partly visible, or concealed beneath clypeus or apparently absent; free, membranous or separated by suture. Major portion of labrum strongly transverse. Apex of labrum subtruncate to slightly convex, or slightly concave or emarginate. Labrum moderately to heavily sclerotized, except at base and-or apex. Mouthparts not forming a piercing or sucking tube. The mandibles are present and are moderately elongated, or very narrow and elongated at the same time. They also are without mola, that have reduced prostheca or doesn't have it at all. Mandibular apex is strongly and abruptly curved mesally and is unidentate, truncate or rounded. The dorsal part of mandible is without tubercle and without setose cavity. The incisor edge of mandible is either simple or have single tooth. Prostheca is absent or without articulated, sclerotized process. Maxilla with distinct galea and lacinia. The maxillary lobe(s) not stylet-like and have a pulp that is without complex organ. The apex of galea or maxillary lobe densely setose or spinose; without heavily sclerotized teeth or hooks. Lacinia without hook(s) or spine(s). Apical maxillary palpomere cylindrical to fusiform; at least as wide as or longer than preapical one. The apical labial palpomere cylindrical to fusiform. Ligula shallowly to moderately emarginate, or deeply emarginate or bilobed.

=== Prothorax ===
Ratio of pronotal length to greatest pronotal width 0.4–1.05. Prothorax widest anteriorly, or at middle, or posteriorly. Sides of prothorax more or less straight, or sinuate. Prothorax not laterally compressed to form cavities for legs. Sides of prothorax not or slightly explanate. Base of prothorax not or slightly narrower than elytral bases, or distinctly narrower than elytral bases. Greatest prothoracic width not or slightly narrower than greatest elytral width, or distinctly narrower than greatest elytral width. Lateral pronotal carinae complete, or incomplete, or absent; simple; visible for their entire lengths from above, or not visible for their entire length from above; without a raised margin. Lateral portion of prothorax without deep pit. Pronotum without anterolateral callosities. Anterior angles of pronotum absent or not produced forward; absent, right or rounded, not produced. Posterior angles of pronotum obtuse or right, or moderately to strongly acute; not produced and acute, or strongly produced and narrowly acute. Posterior edge of pronotum more or less straight or evenly rounded, or distinctly sinuate or variously lobed; simple; not or vaguely margined, or with narrow raised margin or bead. Discal carinae of pronotum absent, or located on posterior angles only. Pronotal disc without paired basal impressions. Pronotum without median longitudinal groove or line. Hypomeron without pit. Anterior portion of prosternum at midline shorter than prosternal process, or as long as prosternal process, or longer than prosternal process. Lateral portion of prosternum in front of coxae shorter than mid length of procoxal cavity, or as long as mid length of procoxal cavity, or longer than mid length of procoxal cavity. Anterior edge of prosternum not produced anteriorly, or distinctly produced forming chin piece (rare). Prosternum in front of coxae concave or biconcave, or flat to moderately convex. Prosternum in front of coxae without paired lines or carinae. Anterior edge of prosternum without mesal excavation. Anterolateral or ventrolateral portions of prothorax without cavities or grooves. Prothoracic cavities absent. Prothoracic grooves absent. Prosternal process complete; narrowed apically, or parallel-sided, or gradually expanded and then narrowed; flat, concave, or only slightly elevated or curved behind coxae, or strongly elevated and curved dorsally behind coxae; slightly overlapping mesoventrite, or moderately to strongly overlapping mesoventrite. Apex of prosternal process acute or narrowly rounded. Prosternal process without transverse groove. Accessory (mesal) procoxal articulation absent. Ventral portion of prothorax on each side with notosternal suture only. Propleuron not extending to anterior edge of prothorax. Propleuron or pleurotrochantin not extending behind coxa. Procoxae not or slightly projecting below prosternum. Procoxa without or with short concealed lateral extension. Procoxal cavity circular or longer than wide. Procoxal cavities at middle narrowly separated, or moderately to widely separated. Procoxal cavities externally open; broadly open. Postcoxal projection absent or very short. Procoxal cavities without narrow lateral extensions, or with narrow lateral extensions. Procoxal cavities internally open, or closed by slender bar. Prothoracic trochantin or pleurotrochantin completely concealed or absent. Promesothoracic clicking mechanism absent, or present.

=== Elytron ===
The ratio of elytral length to greatest elytral width 1.45–2.85. Ratio of elytral length to pronotal length 1.75–5.75. Elytra apunctate, irregularly punctate, or with 5 or fewer distinct puncture rows or striae, or with more than 5 distinct puncture rows, or with more than 5 distinct impressed striae; without scutellary striolae. Number elytral puncture rows or striae 9. Sutural stria absent or not deeply impressed near apex. Abdominal tergites exposed by elytra none or apex of 1, or most of one, or at least one but less than 2, or at least 2 but less than 3, or 3 or more. Exposed abdominal segments more or less flexible. Elytral apices meeting or almost meeting at the suture, or independently rounded or acute and separated by broad gap. Elytral suture not deflected near apex. Elytral apex without internal interlocking tongue. Epipleuron absent or incomplete, or complete; not or gradually narrowed. Lateral edge of elytron straight or weakly sinuate. Pterothorax. Scutellum well developed; not abruptly elevated, or abruptly elevated; anteriorly simple; posteriorly broadly rounded or obtusely angulate, or truncate. Mesoscutum without stridulatory file. Mesoventrite without paired procoxal rests, or with paired procoxal rests. Paired mesoventral procoxal rests absent, horizontal or slightly oblique, or moderately to strongly oblique. Anterior edge of mesoventrite without prosternal rest. Mesoventrite is not divided by longitudinal groove or discrimen. Anterior edge of mesoventrite at midline on same plane as metaventrite. Mesoventral cavity moderately large and shallow, or moderately to very large and deep. Mesocoxa not conical and projecting, or conical and projecting. Mesocoxal cavities at middle contiguous, or narrowly separated. Mesocoxae separated by less than shortest diameter of coxal cavity. Mesocoxal cavities circular to slightly transverse; not or slightly oblique. Mesoventrite separated by complete sutures from mesepisterna. Mesepisterna is distinctly separated at midline; without deep pockets. Mesepimeron not visible from above. Mesocoxal cavities open laterally; not partly closed by metepisterna. Mesoventral process absent or not extending to middle of mesocoxal cavity. Mesometaventral junction absent or a point, or a posteriorly curved, angulate or acute line, or a complex fitting.

=== Metaventral discrimen or median line ===
Metaventral discrimen is moderately to very long. Paired postcoxal lines of metaventrite absent. Postcoxal lines of metaventrite absent. Metaventrite longer than first abdominal ventrite. Postcoxal pits of metaventrite absent. Metaventrite flat to slightly convex, or moderately to strongly convex. Transverse groove of metaventrite absent. Anterior edge of metaventrite without transverse carina between mesocoxal cavities. Exposed portion of metepisternum moderately elongate, or very long and narrow or absent. Metacoxae contiguous or narrowly separated; extending laterally to meet elytra or sides of body; completely separated from metaventrite by suture. Metacoxal plates well developed, more or less uniform, or well developed mesally, weak laterally, or weakly developed, or absent; not concealing most of basal abdominal ventrite. Metacoxae not greatly enlarged; horizontally oriented. Lateral arms of metendosternite short or absent. Metendosternal laminae absent. Ventrolateral processes of metendosternite absent or weakly developed. Anterior process of metendosternite moderately long. Anterior tendons of metendosternite moderately or very close together. Apical portion of metendosternite not or only slightly emarginate.

=== Hind wing ===
The hind wing is well developed, and either highly reduced or absent; with normal transverse folds, or lacking transverse folds. Radial cell of hind wing well developed; elongate. Inner posterior angle formed at base of radial cell right or obtuse. Radial cell is not forming equilateral triangle. Ratio of length of apical area to total wing length less than 0.2. Medial bar of hind wing not crossed by fold. Free veins in medial area of hind wing is 5 or 6. Oblongum cell of hind wing absent. Medial fleck of hind wing absent; absent or not partly bisected by a vein. The wedge cell of hind wing well developed. The anal lobe of hind wing is absent with posterior edge of the hind wing is without a fringe of long hairs.

=== Legs ===
Legs are femoral attachment of mid trochanter transverse or slightly oblique. Mesotrochanter is not reduced or concealed from below. Metafemur not much wider than mesofemur. Mesotibia not strongly widened, or strongly widened, widest at or near apex. Outer edge of mesotibia simple, crenulate or denticulate, or with distinct teeth or long spines. Outer subapical edge of mesotibia without antenna cleaner. Preapical surfaces of mesotibia without ridges or combs. Outer apical angle of mesotibia simple or slightly produced, without lobe, teeth or spines, or with rounded lobe or process, sometimes bearing spines. Mesotibial spurs are either glabrous or absent. Mesotarsus with 5 distinct tarsomeres (pentamerous). Tarsomeres on hind leg at least as many as on mid leg. Tarsomeres on fore leg at least as many as on mid leg. Mesotarsomere 1 well developed and visible. Preapical mesotarsomeres together longer than apical one. Penultimate mesotarsomere not distinctly shorter than antepenultimate. Ventral mesotarsal lobes are absent while mesotarsal claws are paired; subequal in length and similar in form and angle of inclination; simple. Appendage on each tarsal claw absent. Mesotarsal claws without setae near base. Mesotarsal empodium absent or with 2 or fewer setae. Inner subapical edge of protibia without antenna cleaner. Hind legs without swimming hairs. Preapical surfaces of metatibia without ridges or combs.

=== Abdomen ===
The species have either 5, 6, or 7 of abdominal ventrites. The species have either none or four of the basal ventrites connate. The species have either 2 visible or apparently absent abdominal sternite. First ventrite not completely divided by metacoxae. Suture between ventrites 1 and 2 distinct. Suture between ventrites 2 and 3 is distinct. Ventrite 4 articulated with both 3 or 5 of connate. Postcoxal lines on ventrite 1 absent. Ventrite 1 not much longer than 2. Abdominal process acute or narrowly rounded, or absent. Ventrite 5 in female without circular depression. Posterior edge of ventrite 5 not crenulate. Last visible tergite and-or sternite (7 or 8) not forming terminal spine. Subapical abdominal luminous organ absent. Ventrites without setose patches or foveae. Functional spiracles on abdominal segment 8 present. Anterior edge of sternite 8 in male without median strut. Anterior edge of sternite 9 in male without median strut. Tergite 9 in male deeply emarginate. Tergite 10 in male well developed and free.

=== Aedeagus trilobate ===
Aedeagus trilobate is symmetrical. Anterior edge of tegmen or phallobase without struts. Parameres individually articulated to phallobase or base of penis; not outwardly hooked. Penis without dorsal and ventral lobes. Anterior edge of penis without struts, or with paired struts.
