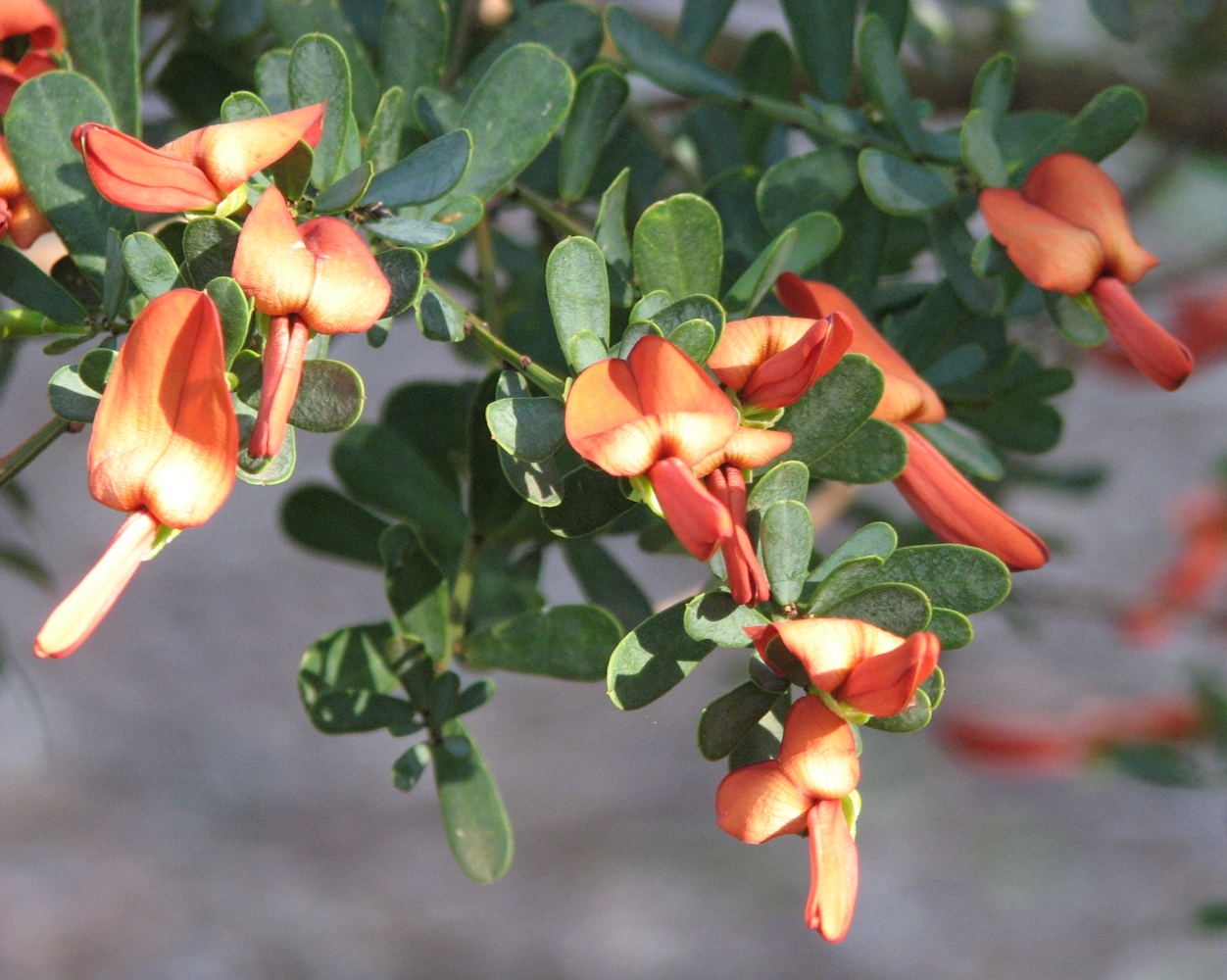
- Templetonia retusa

Scientific classification
- Kingdom: Plantae
- Clade: Embryophytes
- Clade: Tracheophytes
- Clade: Angiosperms
- Clade: Eudicots
- Clade: Rosids
- Order: Fabales
- Family: Fabaceae
- Subfamily: Faboideae
- Clade: Meso-Papilionoideae
- Clade: Genistoids
- Tribe: Brongniartieae (Benth.) Ross and Crisp

Genera
- Amphiodon Huber; Behaimia Griseb.; Brongniartia Kunth; Cristonia J. H. Ross; Cyclolobium Benth.; Harpalyce Sessé & Moçiño ex DC.; Hovea R. Br. ex W. T. Aiton; Lamprolobium Benth.; Limadendron Meireles & A.M.G.Azevedo; Plagiocarpus Benth.; Poecilanthe Benth.; Tabaroa L.P.Queiroz, G.P.Lewis & M.F.Wojc.; Templetonia R. Br. ex W. T. Aiton; Thinicola J. H. Ross
- Range of the Brongniartieae

Synonyms
- Galegeae subtribe Brongniartiinae Benth.

= Brongniartieae =

Tribe of legumes

The tribe Brongniartieae is one of the subdivisions of the plant family Fabaceae, primarily found in tropical regions of the Americas and in Australia The members of this tribe consistently form a monophyletic clade in molecular phylogenetic analyses. The tribe does not currently have a node-based definition, but morphological synapomorphies have been identified:

"stamens united by filaments in an adaxially open tube; anthers alternately long and basifixed, short and versatile; anther connective inconspicuous; septa present between seeds in pods; aril lateral lobe present and fitting into heel of funicle; fine red glandular processes present in axils; and pollen tricolporate with opercula and no definite endoaperture."
