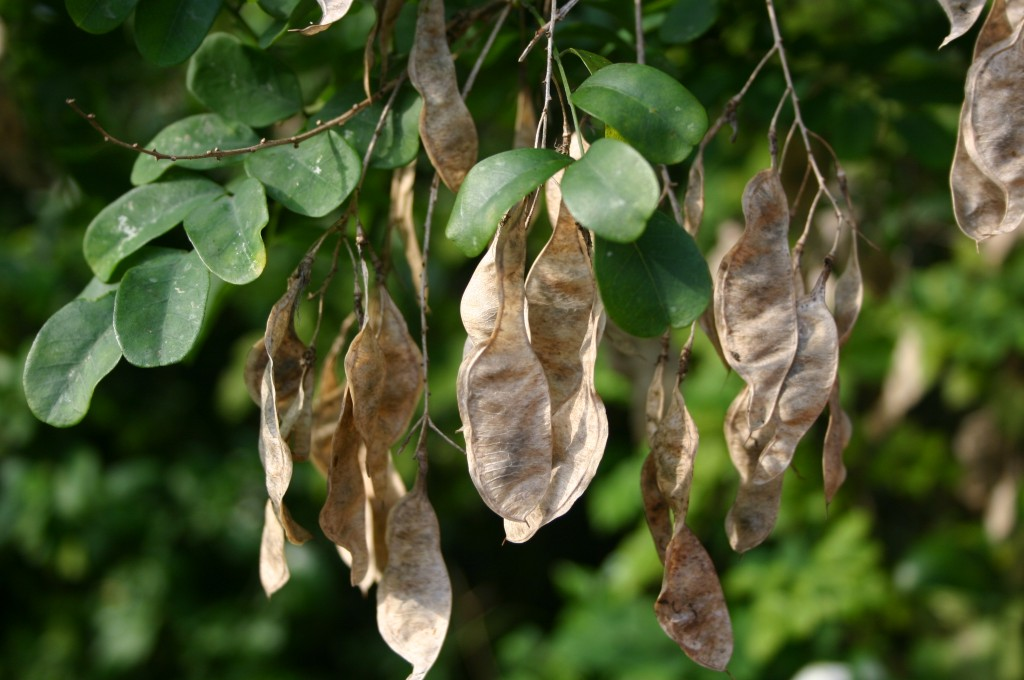
- Seed pods on a branch of Calpurnia aurea

Scientific classification
- Kingdom: Plantae
- Clade: Tracheophytes
- Clade: Angiosperms
- Clade: Eudicots
- Clade: Rosids
- Order: Fabales
- Family: Fabaceae
- Subfamily: Faboideae
- Genus: Calpurnia
- Species: C. aurea

Binomial name
- Calpurnia aurea (Aiton) Benth.

Subspecies
- Calpurnia aurea subsp. aurea (Aiton) Benth.; Calpurnia aurea subsp. indica Brummitt

= Calpurnia aurea =

Species of legume

Calpurnia aurea is a Southern African tree belonging to the family Fabaceae, occurring along the coastal regions from the south-eastern Cape northwards and inland to the central Transvaal, with an isolated population in eastern Zimbabwe. Mostly found as a small tree up to 4 m, but under forest conditions reaching heights of 15 m. This species produces abundant sprays of bright yellow flowers. Leaves are pinnately compound with a terminal leaflet (imparipinnate). Pods are thin and papery, straw-coloured and about 10 cm in length.

== Gallery ==
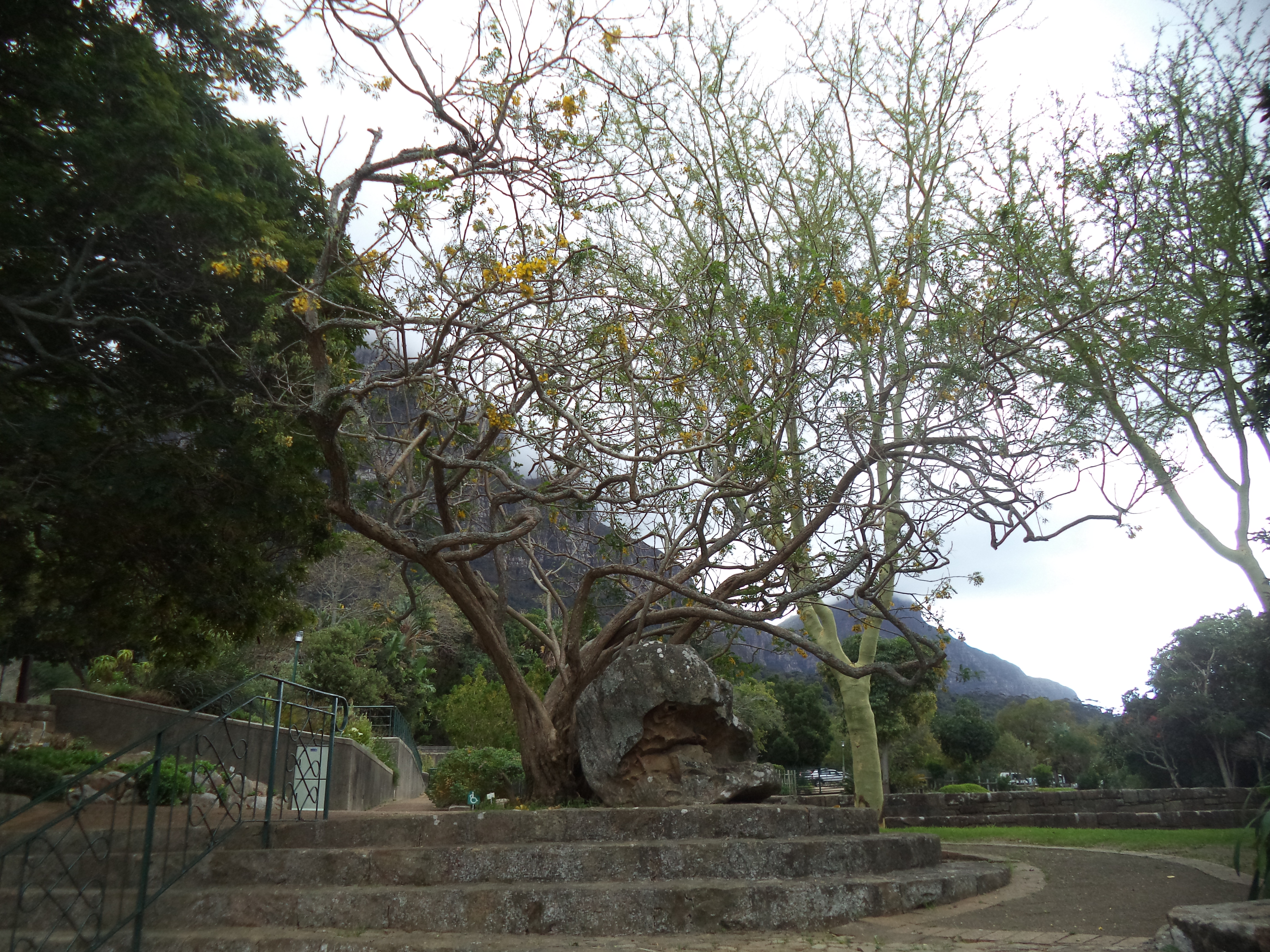
A whole tree in the Kirstenbosch

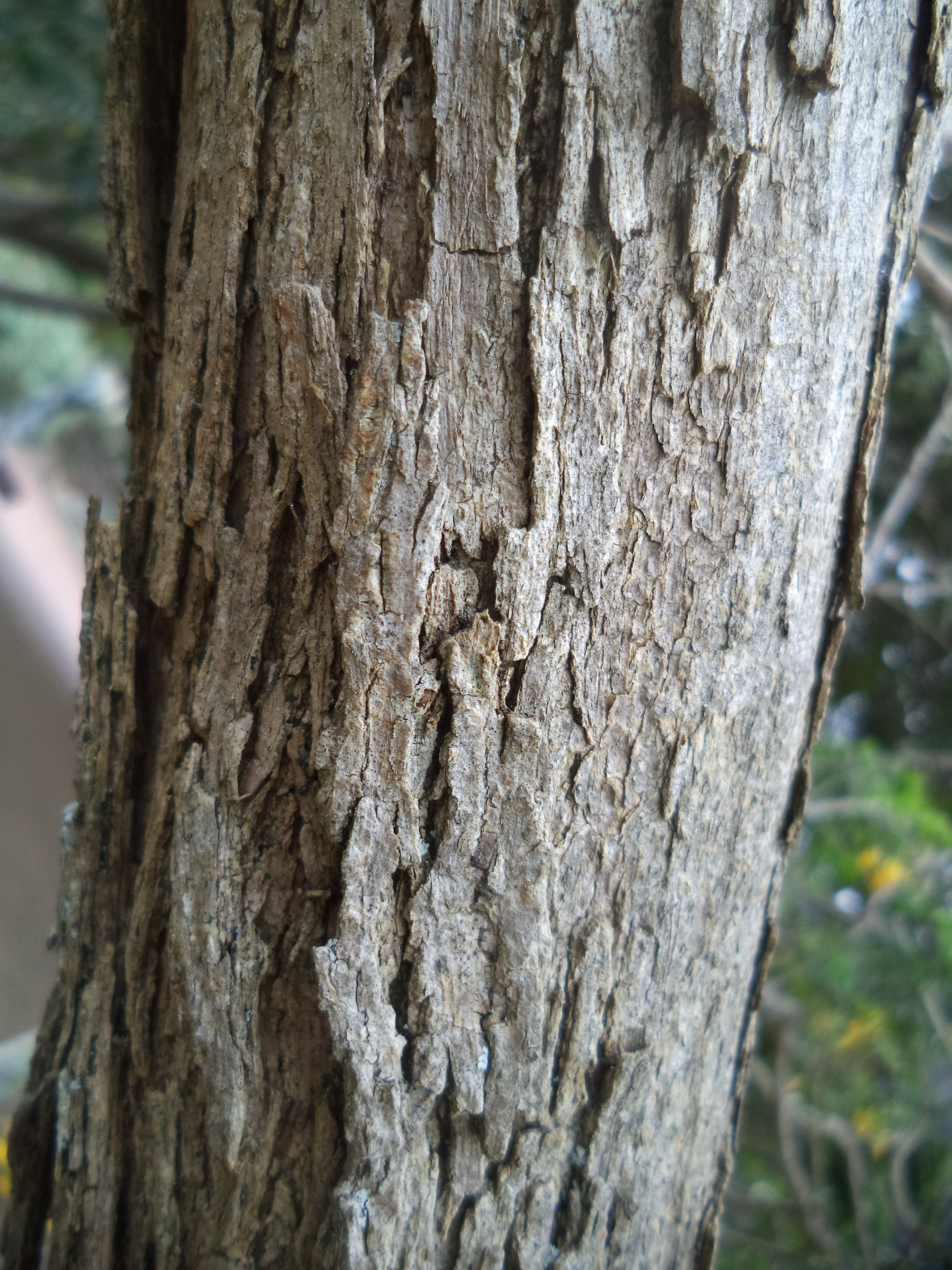
Bark

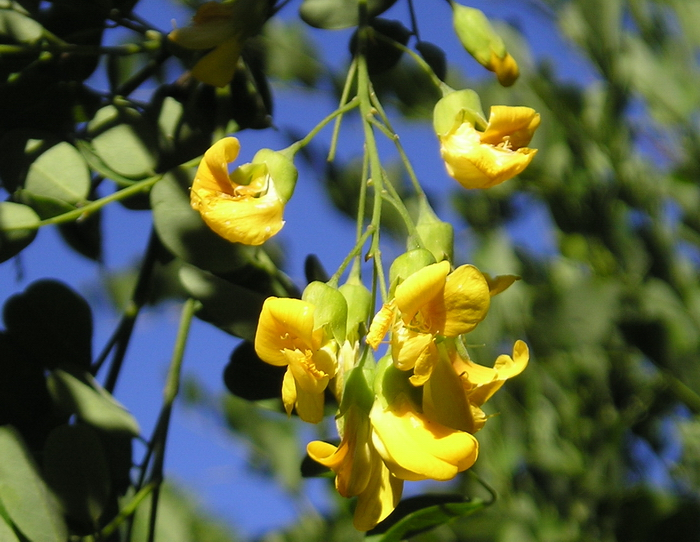
Blossom
