= Brongniartia atra =

Scientific classification
- Domain: Eukaryota
- Kingdom: Animalia
- Phylum: Arthropoda
- Class: Insecta
- Order: Coleoptera
- Suborder: Polyphaga
- Infraorder: Elateriformia
- Family: Elateridae
- Subfamily: Elaterinae
- Tribe: Cebrionini
- Genus: Brongniartia; Leach, 1824
- Species: B. atra

Binomial name
- Brongniartia atra Leach, 1824

Species of beetle

Brongniartia is a genus of cebrionine beetle, named after French naturalist Adolphe Brongniart, and containing a single species, Brongniartia atra.
