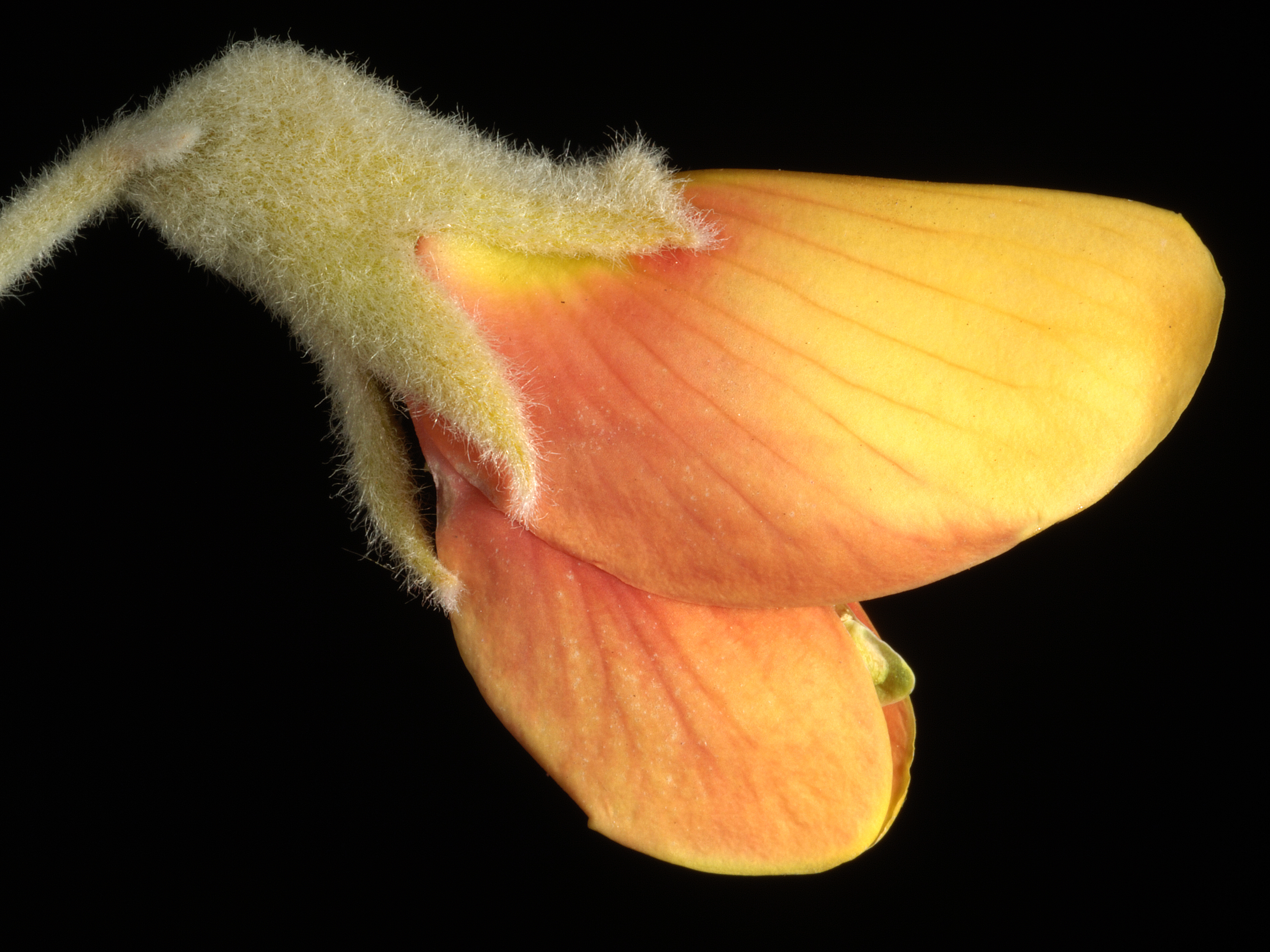

Scientific classification
- Kingdom: Plantae
- Clade: Tracheophytes
- Clade: Angiosperms
- Clade: Eudicots
- Clade: Rosids
- Order: Fabales
- Family: Fabaceae
- Subfamily: Faboideae
- Tribe: Brongniartieae
- Genus: Thinicola; J.H.Ross (2001)
- Species: T. incana

Binomial name
- Thinicola incana (J.H.Ross) J.H.Ross (2001)

Synonyms
- Templetonia incana J.H.Ross (1980)

= Thinicola =

Genus of legumes

Thinicola incana is a species of flowering plant in the legume family, Fabaceae. It is a shrub endemic to central Western Australia. It is the sole species in genus Thinicola, which is in subfamily Faboideae.
