= Cyclolobium =

Scientific classification
- Kingdom: Plantae
- Clade: Tracheophytes
- Clade: Angiosperms
- Clade: Eudicots
- Clade: Rosids
- Order: Fabales
- Family: Fabaceae
- Subfamily: Faboideae
- Tribe: Brongniartieae
- Genus: Cyclolobium; Benth.
- Species: C. brasiliense

Binomial name
- Cyclolobium brasiliense Benth.
- The range of Cyclolobium brasiliense

Synonyms
- Cyclolobium blanchetianum Tul.; Cyclolobium claussenii Benth.; Cyclolobium louveira Chanc.; Cyclolobium nutans Rizzini & Heringer; Cyclolobium vecchii A. Samp.; Cyclolobium vecchii Hoehne

Genus of legumes

Cyclolobium brasiliense (Brazil: louveira, cabruitinga, mucitaíba; Paraguay: ysypó copi) is a species of flowering plants in the legume family, Fabaceae. It belongs to the subfamily Faboideae. It is native to Bolivia, Brazil, and Paraguay and is the only member of the genus Cyclolobium.
