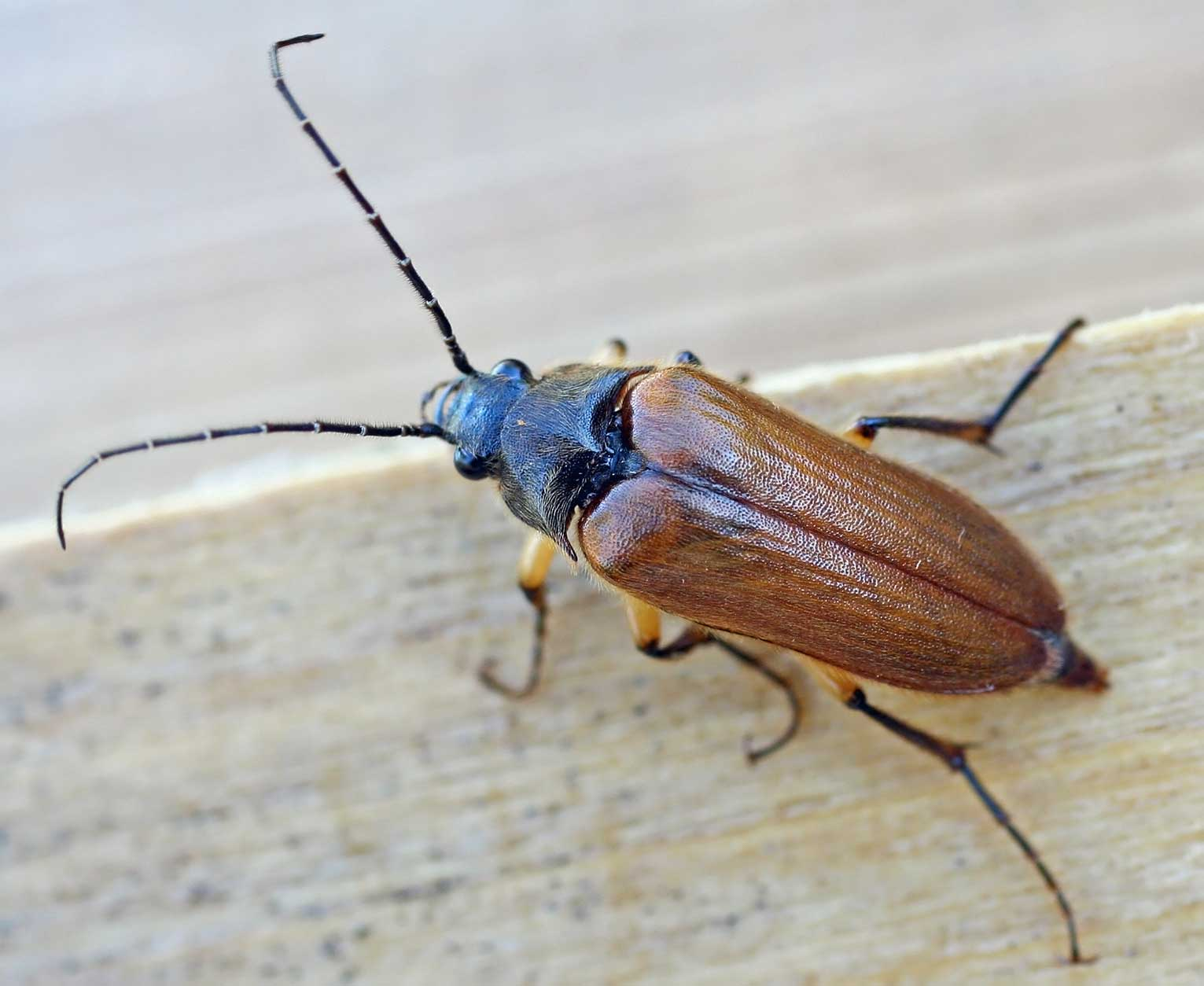
- Cebrio gigas

Scientific classification
- Kingdom: Animalia
- Phylum: Arthropoda
- Class: Insecta
- Order: Coleoptera
- Suborder: Polyphaga
- Infraorder: Elateriformia
- Family: Elateridae
- Tribe: Cebrionini
- Genus: Cebrio; Olivier, 1790

Synonyms
- Hammonia Latreille, 1817; Cebrio Leach, 1824 (Unav.); Analestesa Leach 1824; Tibesia Leach, 1824; Anelastes Agassiz 1846 (Emend.); Cebriognathus Chobaut 1899

= Cebrio =

Genus of beetles

Cebrio is a genus of beetle of the subfamily Elaterinae from the family of click beetles.

== European Species ==
According to Fauna Europaea, the following species are accepted within Cebrio:

- Cebrio amori
- Cebrio andalusicus
- Cebrio angusticornis
- Cebrio antennatus
- Cebrio anthracinus
- Cebrio apicalis
- Cebrio benedicti
- Cebrio brevicornis
- Cebrio bruleirei
- Cebrio cantabricus
- Cebrio carbonarius
- Cebrio carrenii
- Cebrio cordubensis
- Cebrio corsicus
- Cebrio dufouri
- Cebrio elenacompteae
- Cebrio fabricii
- Cebrio fiorii
- Cebrio fossulatus
- Cebrio frater
- Cebrio fuscatus
- Cebrio germari
- Cebrio getschmanni
- Cebrio gigas
- Cebrio gypsicola
- Cebrio impresicollis
- Cebrio insignitus
- Cebrio insularis
- Cebrio maculicollis
- Cebrio malaccensis
- Cebrio melanocephalus
- Cebrio morio
- Cebrio moyses
- Cebrio neapolitanus
- Cebrio nigricornis
- Cebrio parvicollis
- Cebrio personatus
- Cebrio puberulus
- Cebrio pubicornis
- Cebrio rozasi
- Cebrio rubicundus
- Cebrio ruficollis
- Cebrio rufifrons
- Cebrio sardous
- Cebrio seguranus
- Cebrio seoanei
- Cebrio strictus
- Cebrio superbus
- Cebrio suturalis
- Cebrio tarifensis
- Cebrio testaceus
- Cebrio tricolor
- Cebrio ysernii
