= Plagiocarpus =

Scientific classification
- Kingdom: Plantae
- Clade: Tracheophytes
- Clade: Angiosperms
- Clade: Eudicots
- Clade: Rosids
- Order: Fabales
- Family: Fabaceae
- Subfamily: Faboideae
- Tribe: Brongniartieae
- Genus: Plagiocarpus; Benth. (1873)

Species
- Plagiocarpus arcuatus I.Thomps.; Plagiocarpus arnhemicus I.Thomps.; Plagiocarpus axillaris Benth.; Plagiocarpus conduplicatus I.Thomps.; Plagiocarpus dispermus I.Thomps.; Plagiocarpus lanatus I.Thomps.; Plagiocarpus longiflorus I.Thomps.
- Range of Plagiocarpus

Genus of legumes

Plagiocarpus is a genus of flowering plants in the legume family, Fabaceae. It includes seven species of shrubs or subshrubs native to northern Australia, from the Kimberley region of Western Australia to western Queensland. Their habitats include seasonally-dry tropical to subtropical woodland, bushland and thicket, shrubland, and grassland, typically on sandstone or sandy soils. It belongs to the subfamily Faboideae.
