= Lamprolobium =

Scientific classification
- Kingdom: Plantae
- Clade: Tracheophytes
- Clade: Angiosperms
- Clade: Eudicots
- Clade: Rosids
- Order: Fabales
- Family: Fabaceae
- Subfamily: Faboideae
- Tribe: Brongniartieae
- Genus: Lamprolobium; Benth. (1864)

Species
- Lamprolobium fruticosum Benth.; Lamprolobium grandiflorum Everist ex R.J.F.Hend.
- Range of Lamprolobium

Genus of legumes

Lamprolobium is a genus of flowering plants in the legume family, Fabaceae. It includes two species endemic to Queensland. It belongs to the subfamily Faboideae.
