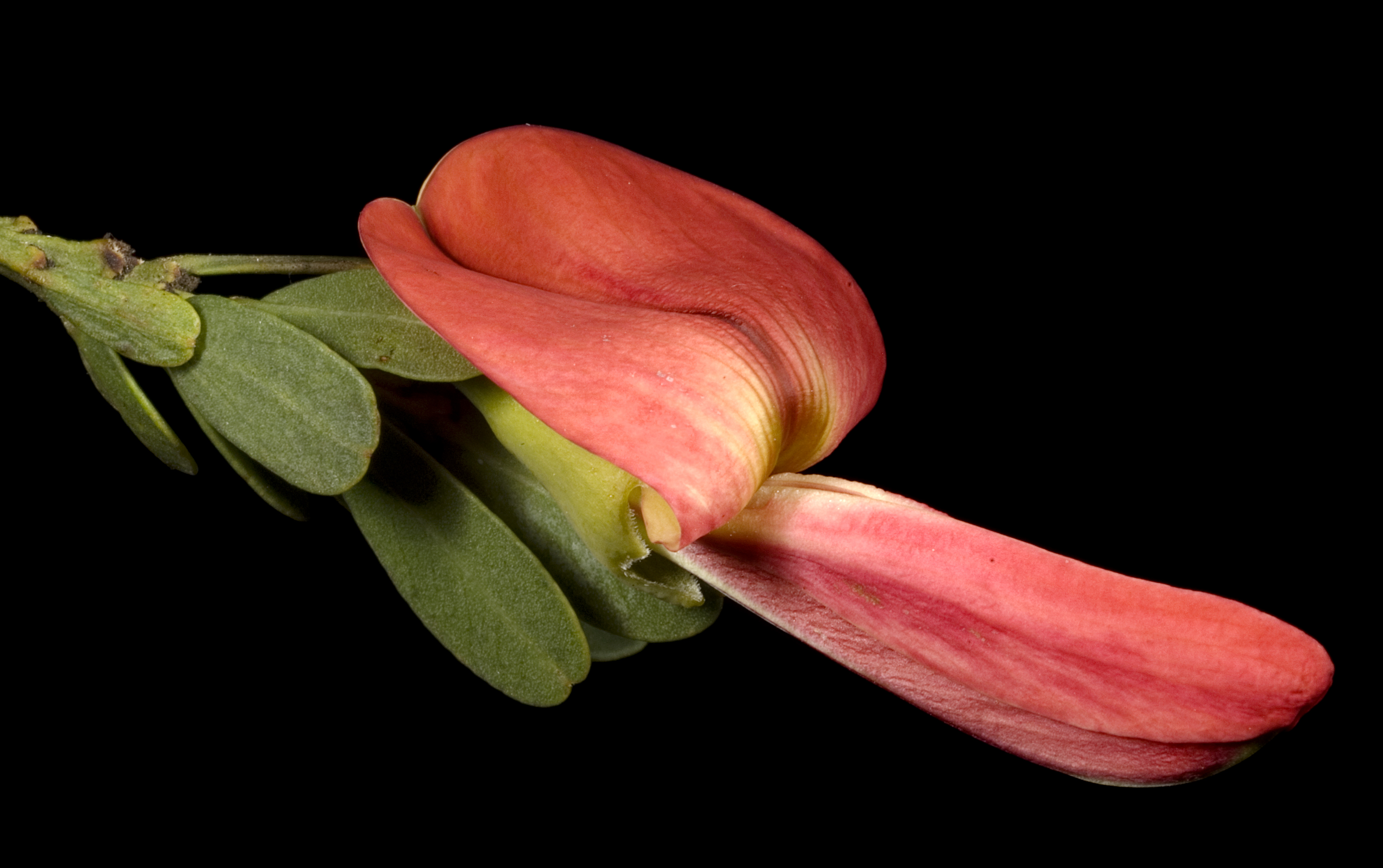

Scientific classification
- Kingdom: Plantae
- Clade: Tracheophytes
- Clade: Angiosperms
- Clade: Eudicots
- Clade: Rosids
- Order: Fabales
- Family: Fabaceae
- Subfamily: Faboideae
- Genus: Templetonia
- Species: T. retusa

Binomial name
- Templetonia retusa (Vent.) R.Br.

Synonyms
- Rafnia retusa Vent.; Templetonia glauca Sims

= Templetonia retusa =

Species of legume

Templetonia retusa, known as cockies tongues, cocky's tongues, or coral bush is a shrub in the family Fabaceae (Leguminosae) that grows in southern and south-western Australia. It grows up to 2 metres (6 ft 7 in) high, with leaves 15–40 millimetres (0.6–1.6 in) long and 7–25 mm (0.3–1.0 in) wide. Its flowers are normally a rich red colour, and are 25–40 mm (1.0–1.6 in) long. The seed pods are 40–50 mm (1.6–2.0 in) long and around 10 mm (0.4 in) wide. It is found in coastal woodland and heaths over limestone from Shark Bay, Western Australia, to near Kangaroo Island, as well as inland in the Flinders Ranges of South Australia.
