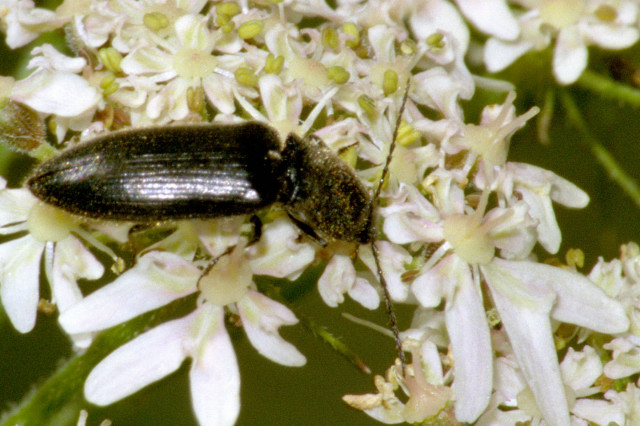
- Melanotus villosus male

Scientific classification
- Kingdom: Animalia
- Phylum: Arthropoda
- Class: Insecta
- Order: Coleoptera
- Suborder: Polyphaga
- Infraorder: Elateriformia
- Family: Elateridae
- Subfamily: Elaterinae
- Tribe: Ampedini
- Genus: Melanotus
- Species: M. villosus

Binomial name
- Melanotus villosus Gmelin, 1789

= Melanotus villosus =

Species of beetle

Melanotus villosus is a species of beetle in the family Elateridae and the genus Melanotus.

== Description ==
Adult beetles size is 14–19 millimetres (0.55–0.75 in), but could extend up to 20 millimetres (0.79 in). The color of body and legs is black. It carries brown tarsi on its legs. And the antennas are brownish-black. Males have longer antennas and prothorax than females.

== Distribution ==
The species can be found everywhere throughout England (Sherwood Forest), Wales, Scotland (especially in Loch Lomond, Dumfries, and Galloway), and the far North-west.

== Ecology ==
The beetle eats old pine stumps.
