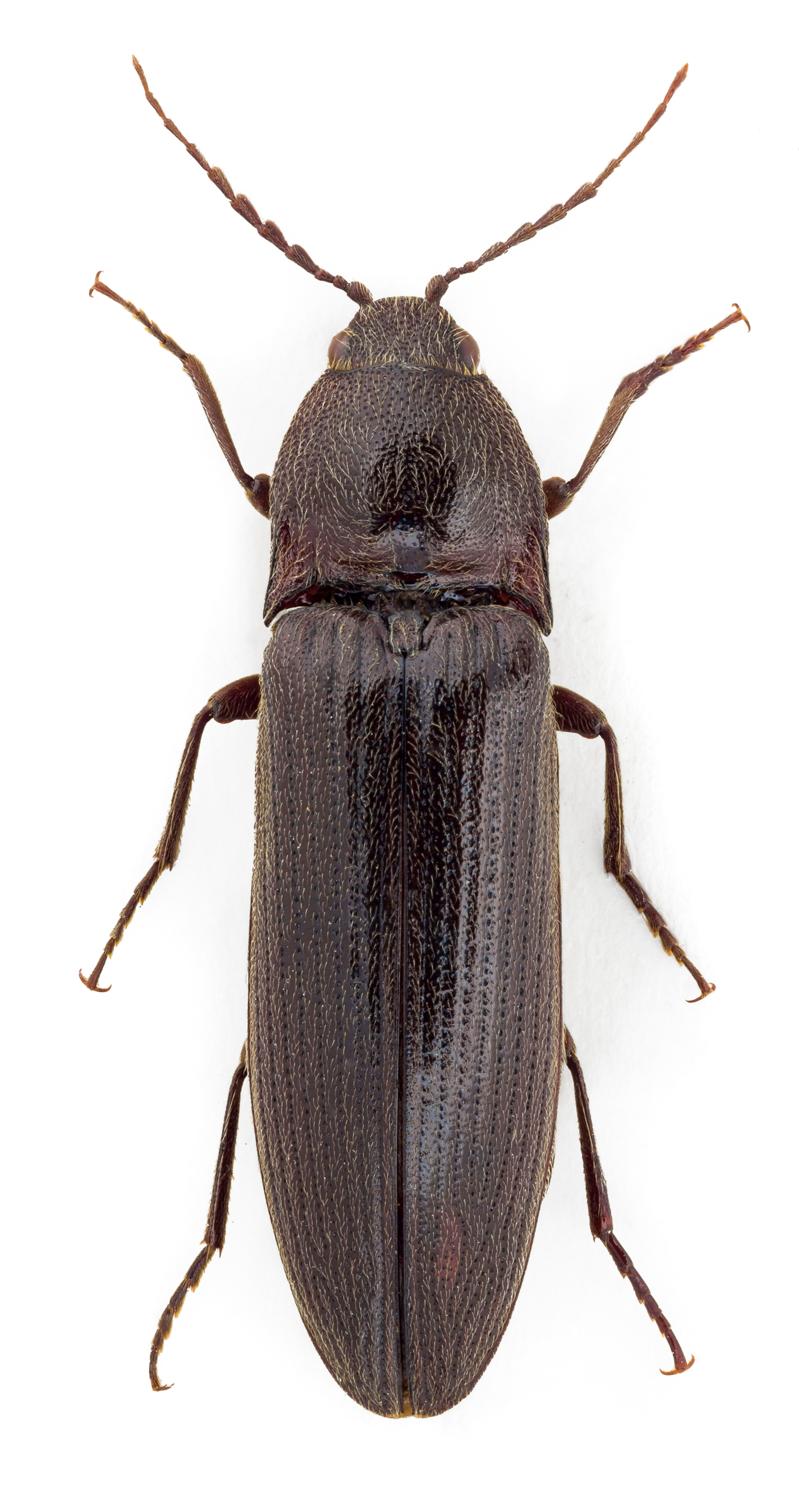
- Melanotus castanipes

Scientific classification
- Kingdom: Animalia
- Phylum: Arthropoda
- Class: Insecta
- Order: Coleoptera
- Suborder: Polyphaga
- Infraorder: Elateriformia
- Family: Elateridae
- Subfamily: Elaterinae
- Tribe: Ampedini
- Genus: Melanotus; Eschscholtz, 1829

Synonyms
- Cratonychus Boisduval & Lacordaire, 1835; Cremnostethus Schwarz, 1901; Cremnosthetus Schwarz, 1902; Ctenonychus Dejean, 1833; Dodecactenus Candèze, 1889; Kensaculus Hayek, 1990; Kensakulus Chujo & Ôhira, 1965; Malanotus Ôhira, 1993; Melanotopsis Lewis, 1894; Melantus Ôhira, 1967; Melatonus Ôhira, 1973; Menalotus Eschscholtz, 1832; Natomelus Dolin, 1979; Nishimelanotus Ôhira, 2001; Perimeces Scudder, 1882; Perimecus Dillwyn, 1829; Speniscosomus Miwa, 1934; Sphenicosomus du Buysson, 1894; Spheniscosomus Schwarz, 1892; Tenalomus Fleutiaux, 1933; Terimecus Schwarz, 1906; Xanthus Gistl, 1834

= Melanotus (beetle) =

Genus of beetles

Melanotus is a genus of click beetles in the family Elateridae. There are close to 800 described species in Melanotus, found worldwide. Many of the better studied species are from Western Eurasia or North America

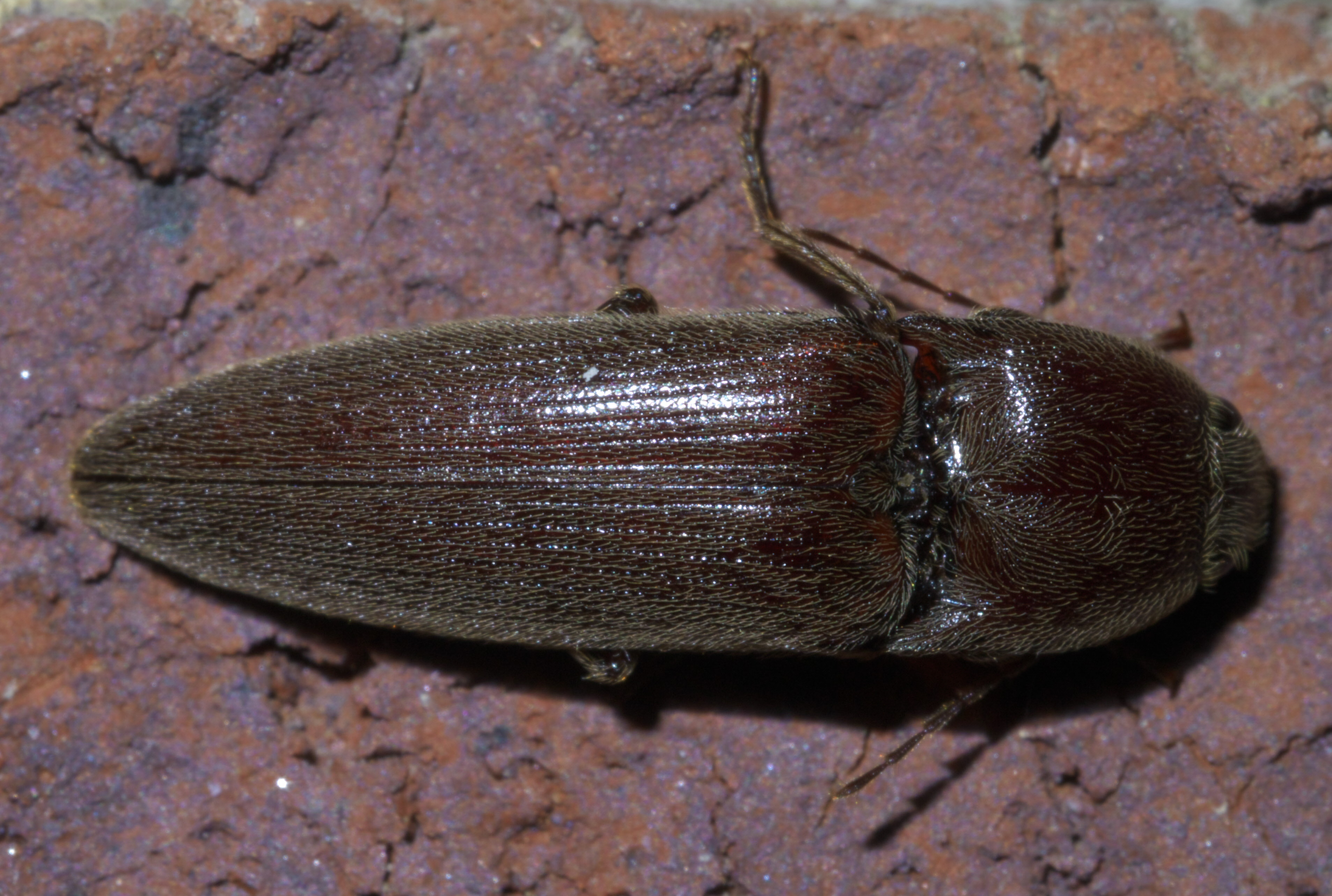
Melanotus, Oklahoma

== Species ==
The following are among the nearly 800 described Melanotus species:

- Melanotus acuminatus Reitter, 1891
- Melanotus admirabilis Gurjeva, 1994
- Melanotus aemulus (Erichson, 1841)
- Melanotus amamiensis Ohira, 1967
- Melanotus americanus (Herbst, 1806)
- Melanotus amianus Kishii, 1992
- Melanotus annosus Candeze, 1865
- Melanotus atayal Kishii & Platia, 1991
- Melanotus babai Kishii, 1989
- Melanotus bajulus (Erichson, 1841)
- Melanotus brignolii Guglielmi & Platia, 1985
- Melanotus brunniopacus Kishii, 1989
- Melanotus brunnipes (Germar, 1824)
- Melanotus castanipes (Paykull, 1800)
- Melanotus cete Candeze, 1860
- Melanotus chengi Kishii, 1994
- Melanotus chiricahuae Knull, 1962
- Melanotus cinerascens (Kuster, 1852)
- Melanotus clandestinus (Erichson, 1842)
- Melanotus communis (Gyllenhal, 1817)
- Melanotus concisus Knull 1959
- Melanotus concisus Knull 1959
- Melanotus correctus Candeze, 1865
- Melanotus corticinus (Say, 1823)
- Melanotus crassicollis (Erichson, 1841)
- Melanotus cribricollis Candeze, 1860
- Melanotus cribriventris Blatchley 1910
- Melanotus cuneiformis (Baudi, 1871)
- Melanotus decumanus (Erichson, 1841)
- Melanotus depressus (Melsheimer, 1844)
- Melanotus desbrochersi Candeze, 1881
- Melanotus dichroides Platia & Gudenzi, 1999
- Melanotus dichrous (Erichson, 1841)
- Melanotus dietrichi Quate 1967
- Melanotus difficilis Blatchley 1910
- Melanotus erythropygus Candeze, 1873
- Melanotus ferrugineus Schwarz, 1891
- Melanotus fortnumi Candeze, 1878
- Melanotus fraseri Platia & Schimmel, 1993
- Melanotus frequens (Miwa, 1930)
- Melanotus fulvus Reitter, 1891
- Melanotus fusciceps (Gyllenhal, 1817)
- Melanotus gracilipennis Kishii & Platia, 1993
- Melanotus gradatus LeConte 1866
- Melanotus graecus Platia & Schimmel, 1993
- Melanotus horishanus (Miwa, 1927)
- Melanotus hourai Kishii, 1989
- Melanotus housaii Kishii, 1991
- Melanotus hyslopi Van Zwaluwenburg, 1921
- Melanotus ignobilis Melsheimer, 1844
- Melanotus indistinctus Quate 1967
- Melanotus insignitus Platia, 2011
- Melanotus insipiens (Say 1839)
- Melanotus iranicus Platia & Gudenzi, 1999
- Melanotus japonicus Ohira, 1974
- Melanotus juhaszae Platia & Schimmel, 2007
- Melanotus kalabzai Platia & Gudenzi, 2006
- Melanotus karajensis Platia, 2013
- Melanotus kawakatsui Kishii, 1990
- Melanotus kintaroui Kishii, 1989
- Melanotus kishii Platia, 2005
- Melanotus klimenkoi Platia, 2012
- Melanotus kliri Cate, Platia & Schimmel, 2002
- Melanotus koikei Kishii & Ohira, 1956
- Melanotus kraatzi Schwarz, 1892
- Melanotus krali Platia & Schimmel, 2001
- Melanotus lameyi Fleutiaux, 1918
- Melanotus lanceatus Quate 1967
- Melanotus lanei Quate 1967
- Melanotus legatus Candeze, 1860
- Melanotus leonardi (LeConte, 1853)
- Melanotus lewisi Schenkling, 1927
- Melanotus liukueiensis Kishii, 1989
- Melanotus longulus (LeConte 1853)
- Melanotus loudai Platia & Gudenzi, 2005
- Melanotus lutaoanus Kishii, 1994
- Melanotus macer (LeConte 1853)
- Melanotus melanotoides (Miwa, 1930)
- Melanotus miscellus Quate, 1967
- Melanotus monticola (Menetries, 1832)
- Melanotus morosus Candèze, 1860
- Melanotus niponicus Ohira, 1964
- Melanotus oblongulus Kishii, 1989
- Melanotus ocellatopunctatus Lewis, 1894
- Melanotus okinawensis Ohira, 1982
- Melanotus opacicollis LeConte 1866
- Melanotus parallelus Blatchley 1920
- Melanotus pertinax (Say, 1839)
- Melanotus phoenicius Platia, 2011
- Melanotus pieli Platia & Schimmel, 2001
- Melanotus pilosulus (Miwa, 1927)
- Melanotus pilosus Blatchley, 1910
- Melanotus pishanensis Kishii, 1989
- Melanotus prasinus Blatchley, 1910
- Melanotus punctolineatus (Pelerin, 1829)
- Melanotus punctosinus Cate, Platia & Schimmel, 2002
- Melanotus punctosus (Walker, 1858)
- Melanotus raziae Akhter, 2011
- Melanotus richterae Mardjanian, 2015
- Melanotus rufiventris Miwa, 1930
- Melanotus rugulipenis Champion, 1895
- Melanotus sagittarius (LeConte, 1853)
- Melanotus satoi Ohira, 1967
- Melanotus seniculus Candeze, 1873
- Melanotus senilis Candeze, 1865
- Melanotus shinoharai Kishii & Platia, 1993
- Melanotus similis (Kirby, 1837)
- Melanotus sobrinus (Ménétriés, 1832) Menetries, 1832
- Melanotus spadix (Erichson, 1841)
- Melanotus spernendus Candeze, 1873
- Melanotus staudingeri (Candèze, 1889)
- Melanotus sulcicollis (Mulsant & Guillebeau, 1855)
- Melanotus suzukii Platia & Schimmel, 2007
- Melanotus taiwanus Kishii, 1989
- Melanotus takaoanus Kishii, 1989
- Melanotus takasago Kishii, 1989
- Melanotus tamsuyensis Bates, 1866
- Melanotus tauricola Dolin, 1980
- Melanotus tenax (Say 1839)
- Melanotus tenebrosus (Erichson, 1841)
- Melanotus testaceus (Melsheimer, 1845)
- Melanotus trapezoideus (LeConte, 1853)
- Melanotus turkestanicus Schwarz, 1892
- Melanotus verberans (LeConte 1853)
- Melanotus villosus (Geoffroy, 1785)
- Melanotus vunum Kishii, 1991
- Melanotus yaeyamacola Kishii, 1974
- Melanotus yagianus Kishii, 1990

== Gallery ==
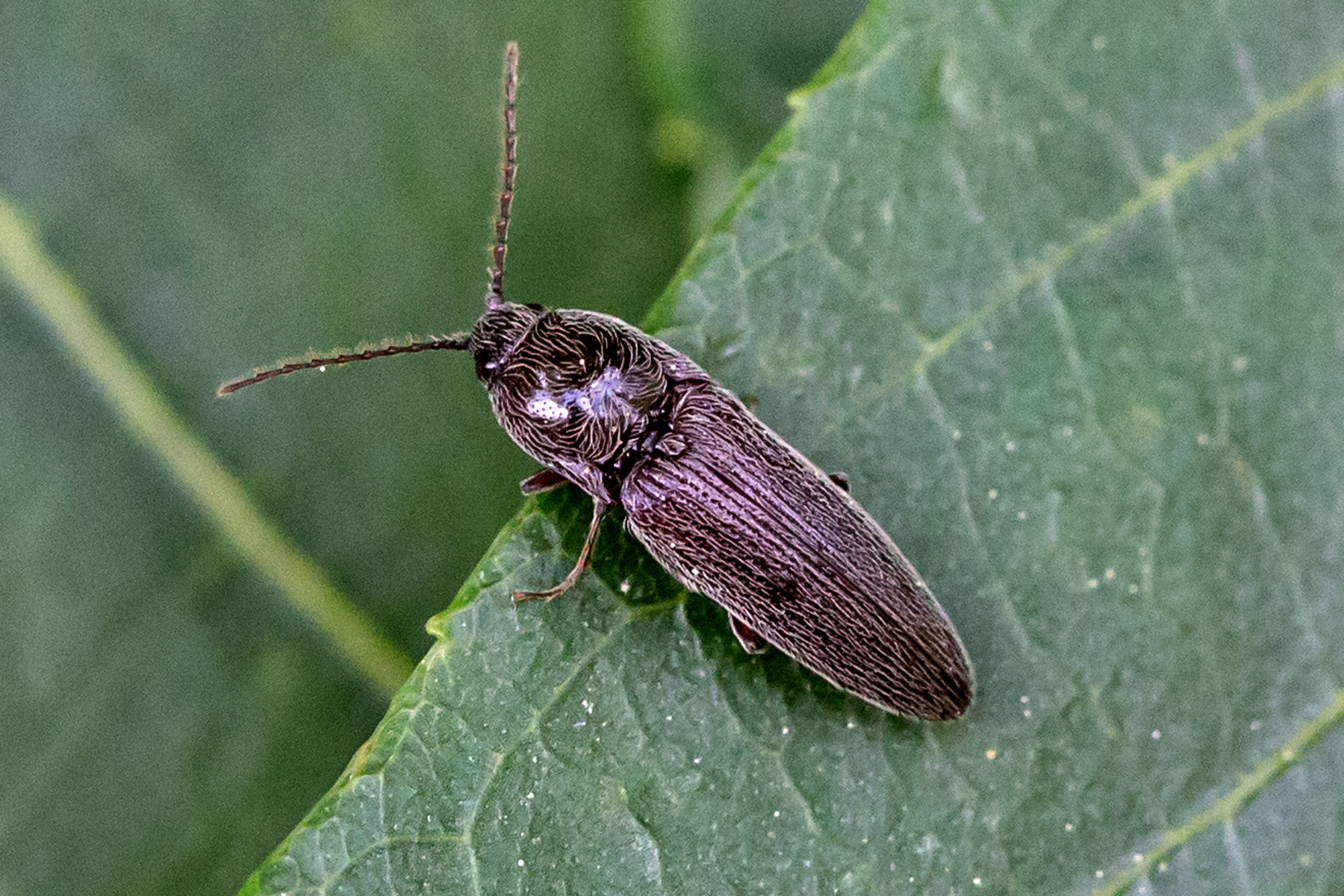
Melanotus americanus, Pennsylvania

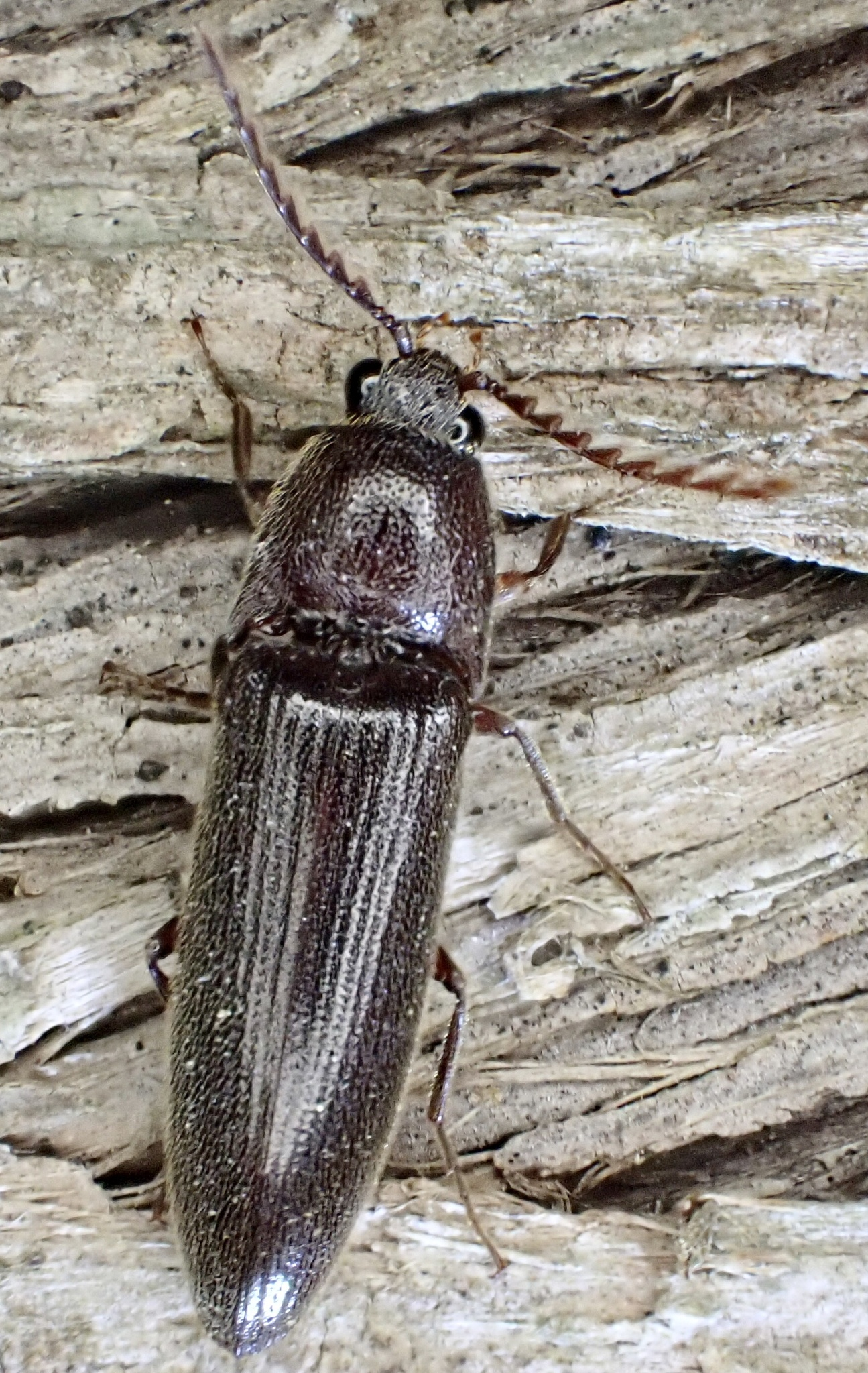
Melanotus castanipes, Canada

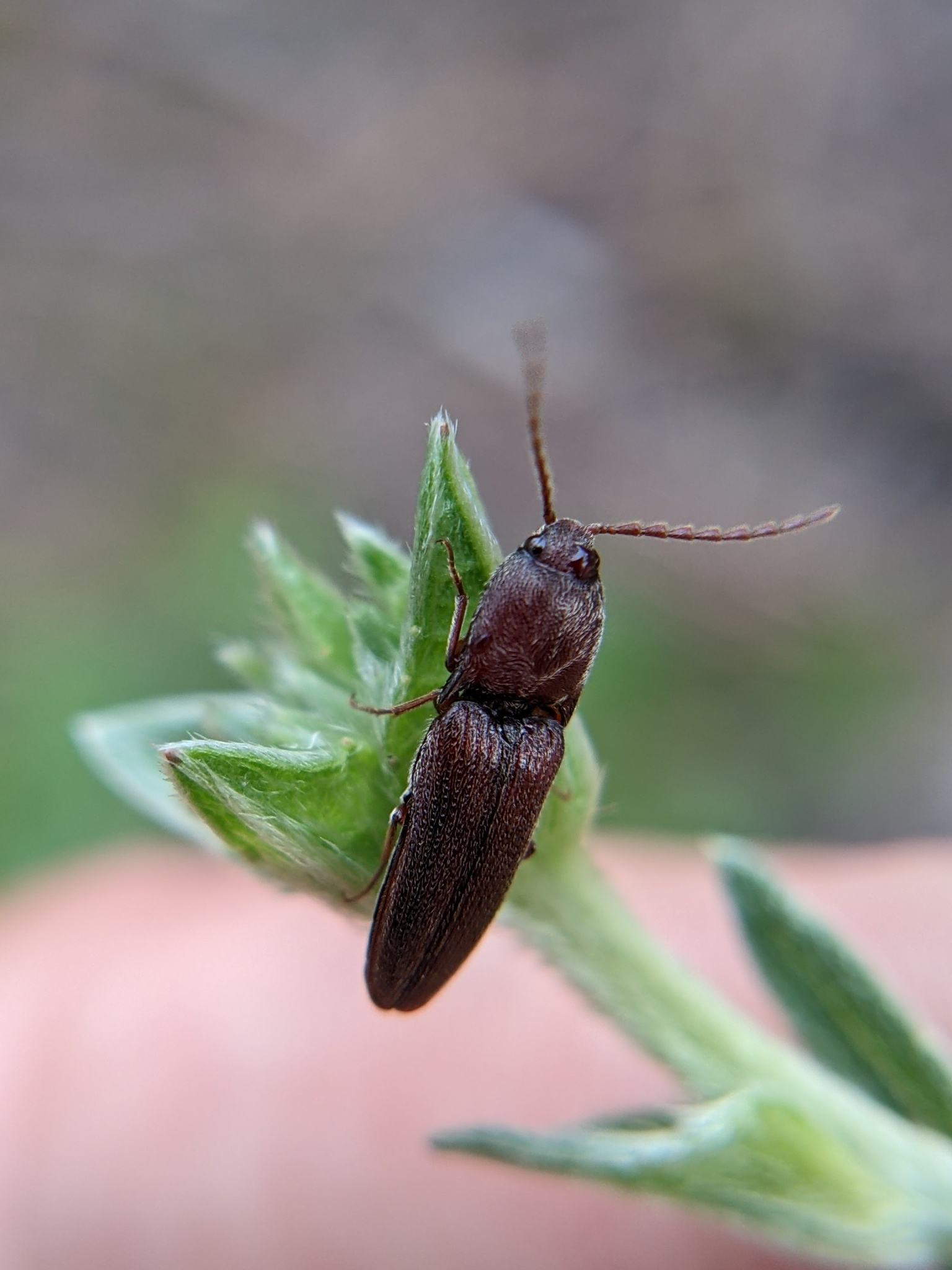
Melanotus clandestinus, Florida

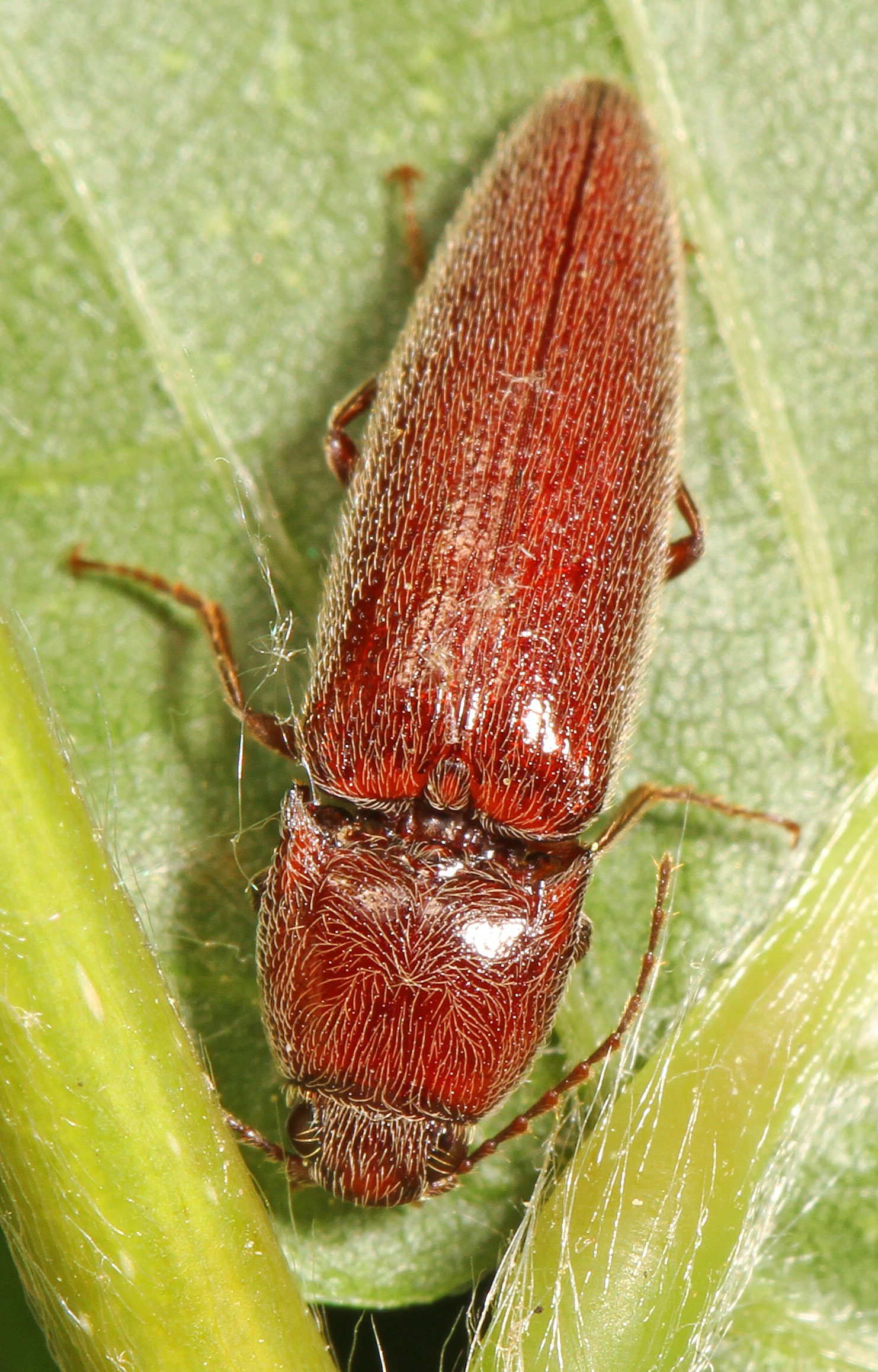
Melanotus communis complex, Virginia

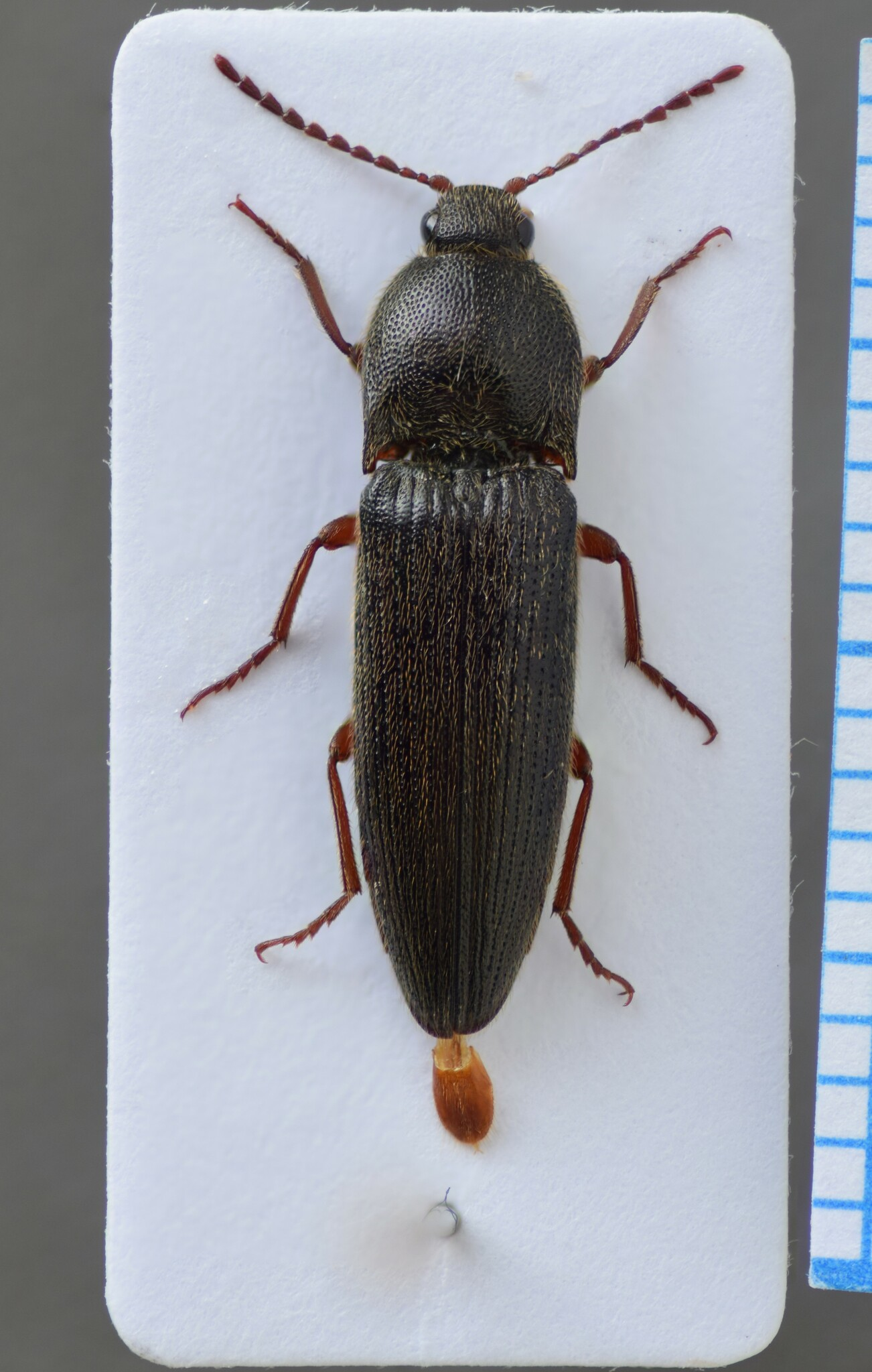
Melanotus crassicollis, Ukraine

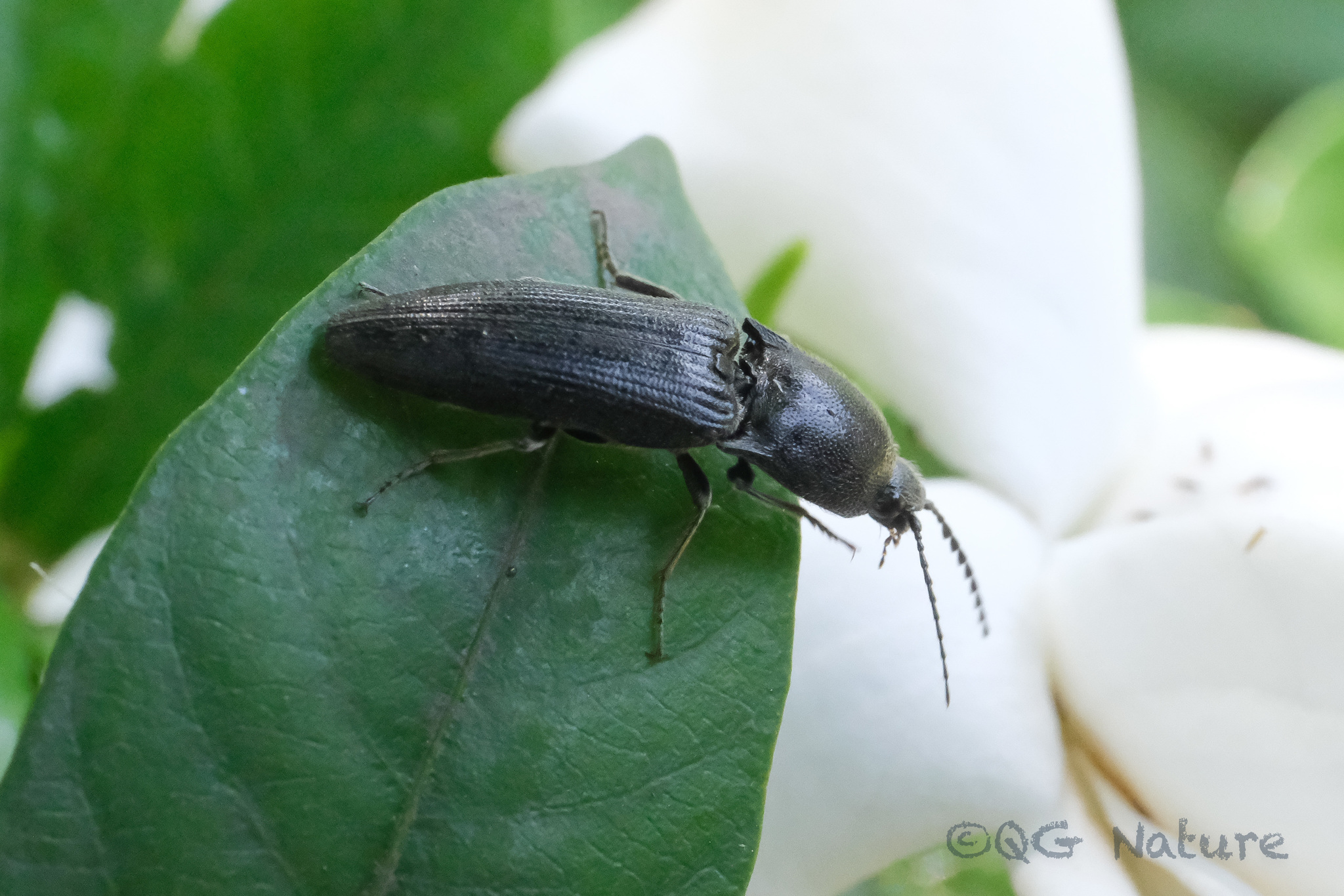
Melanotus cribricollis, China

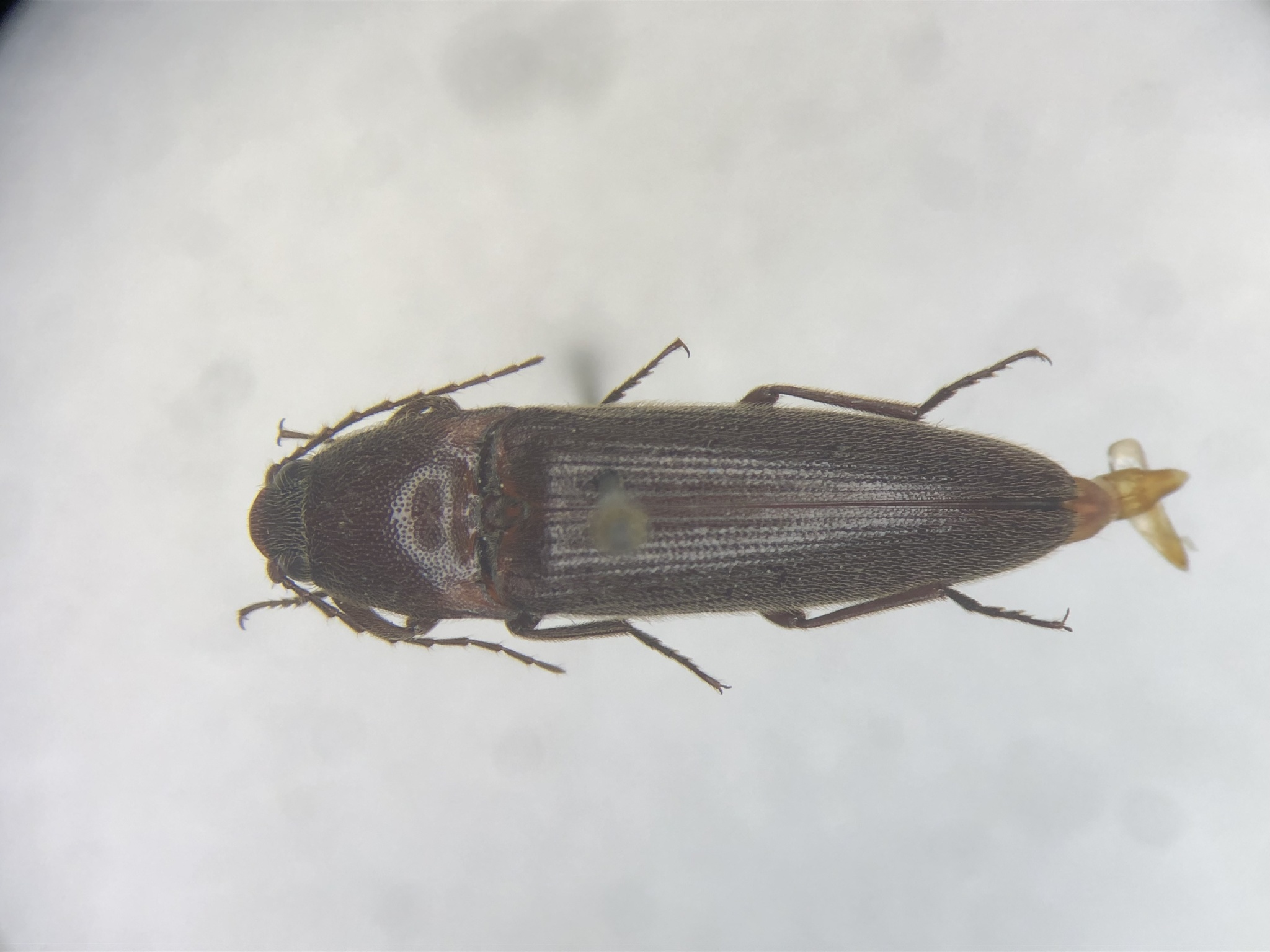
Melanotus decumanus, Canada

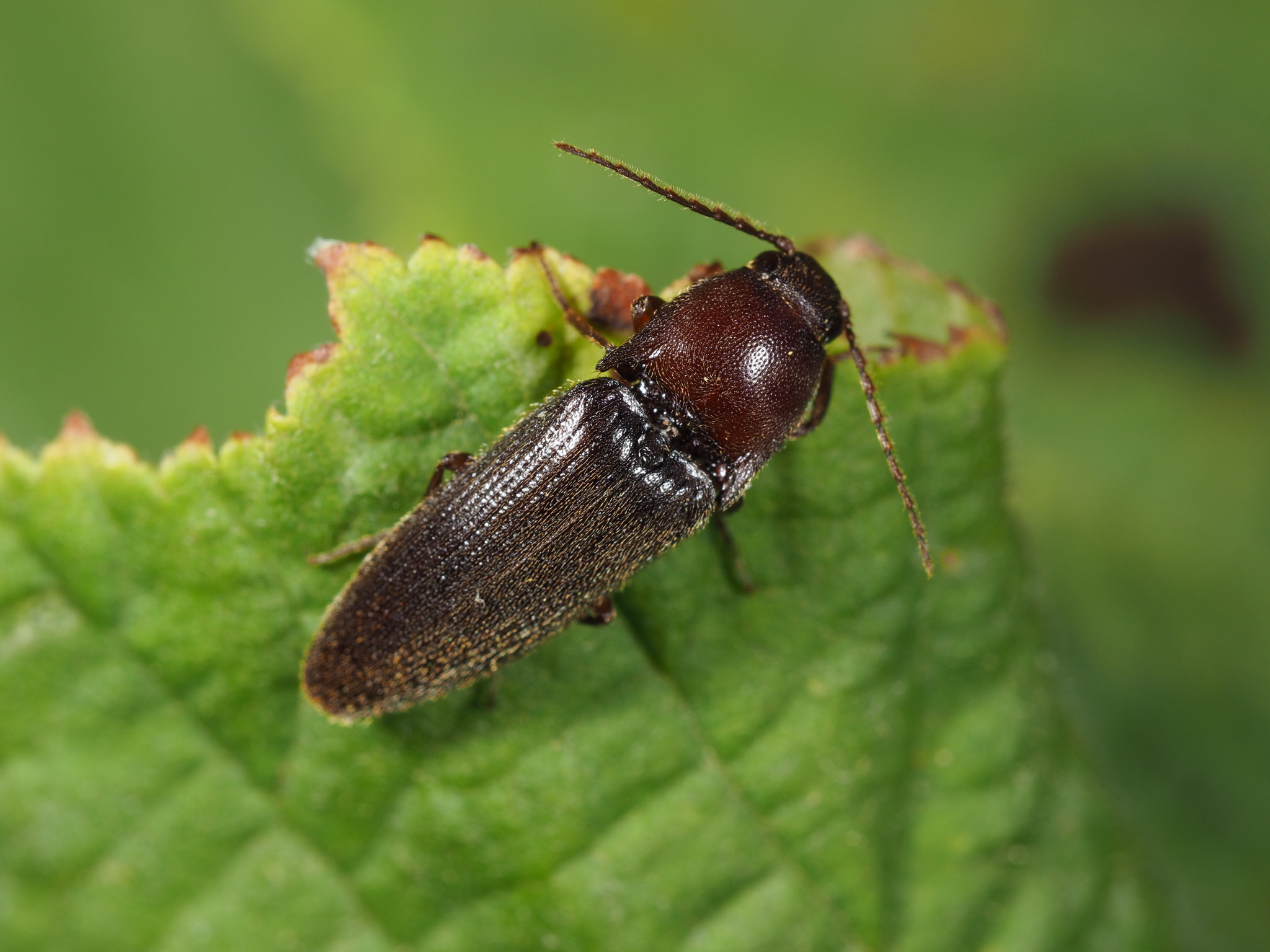
Melanotus dichrous, Italy

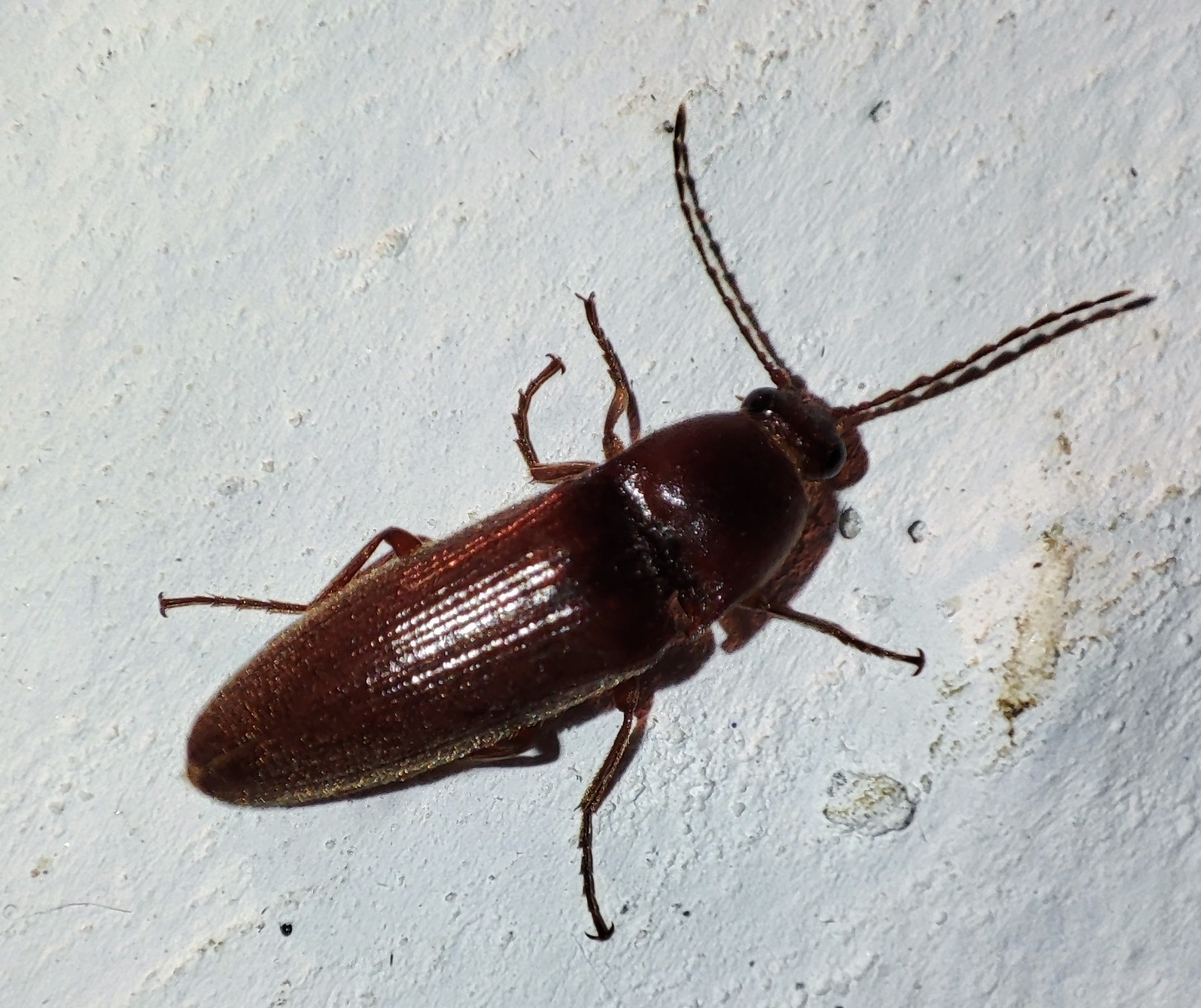
Melanotus fusciceps, Ukraine

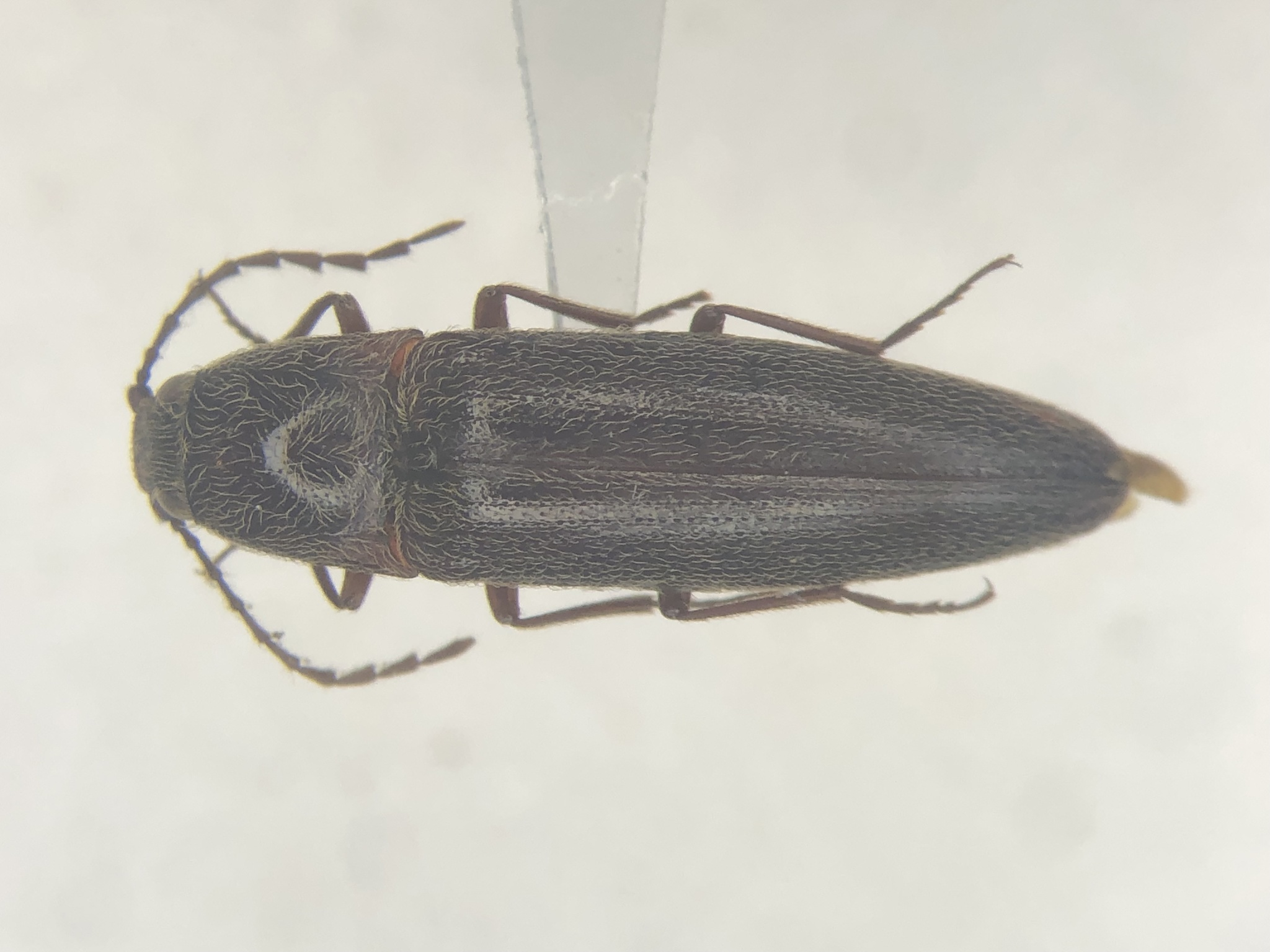
Melanotus hyslopi, Canada

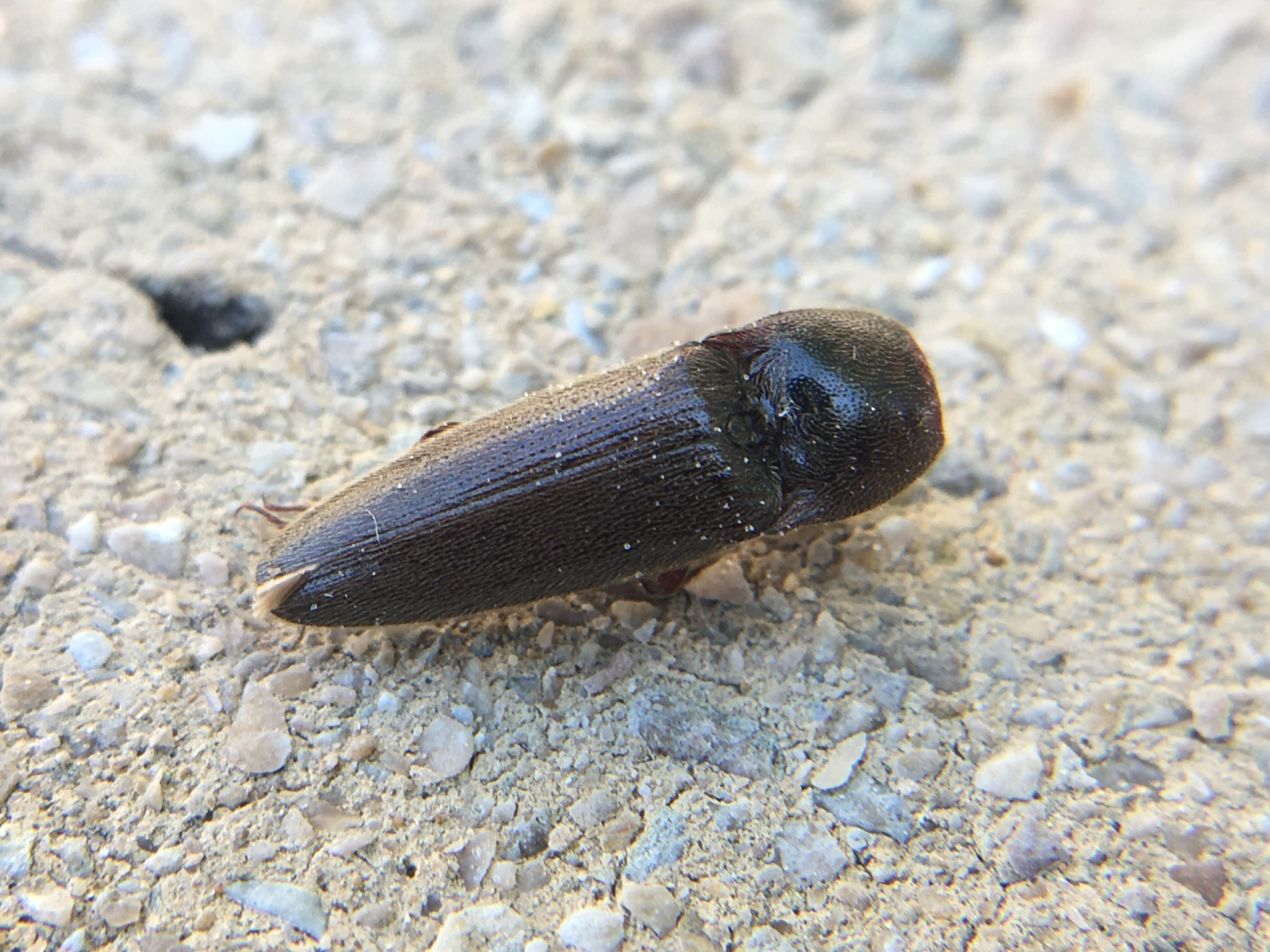
Melanotus ignobilis, Texas

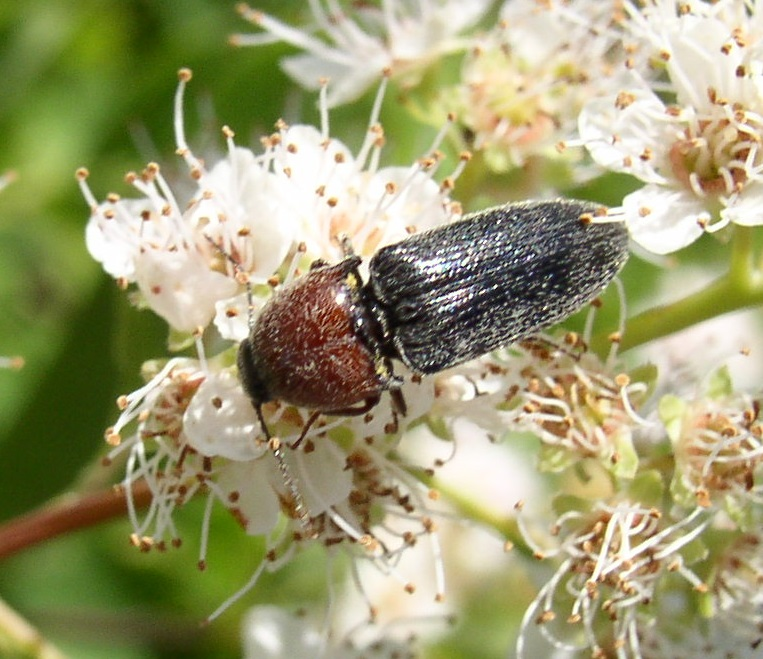
Melanotus leonardi, Maine

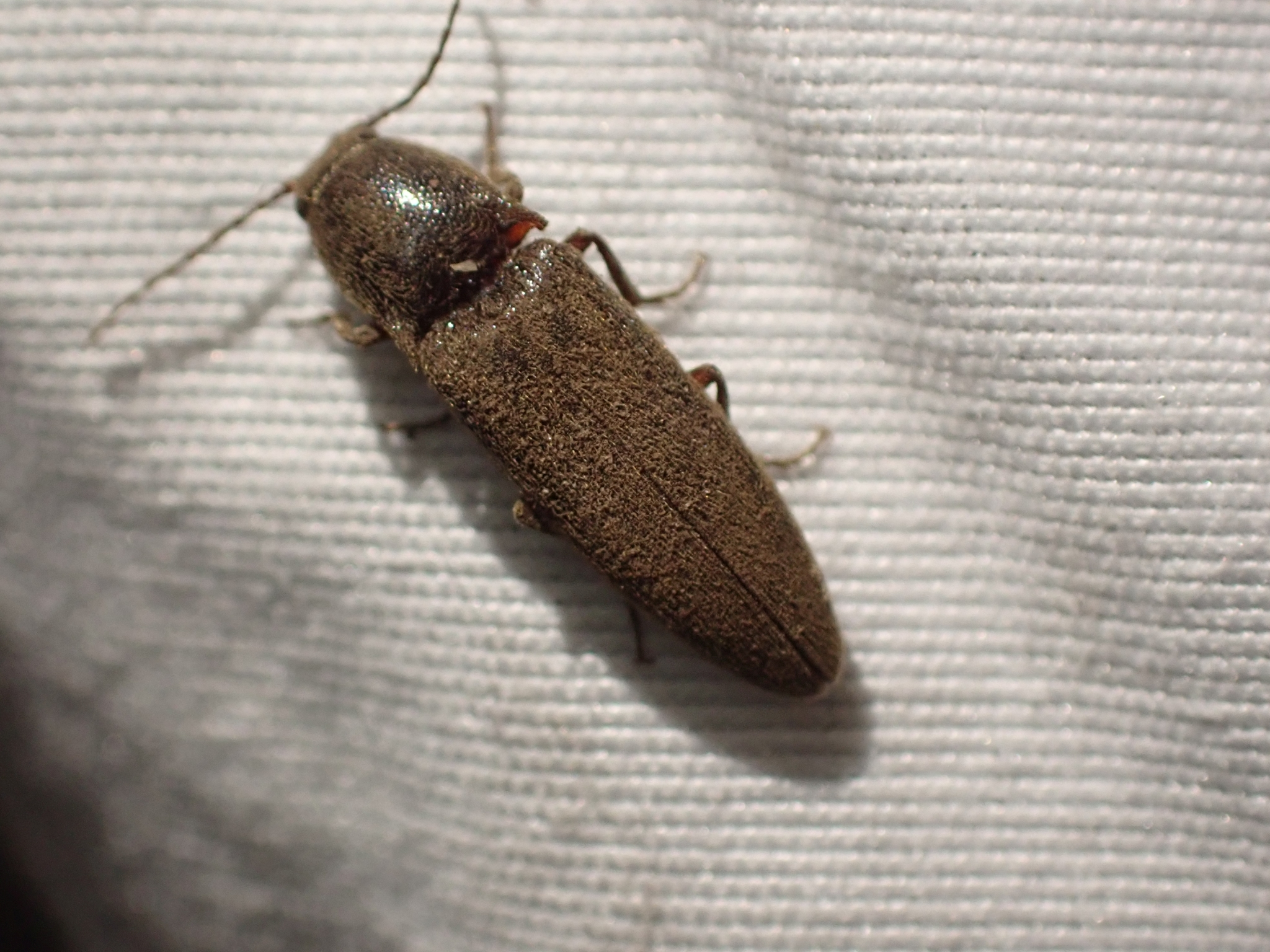
Melanotus longulus oregonensis, Canada

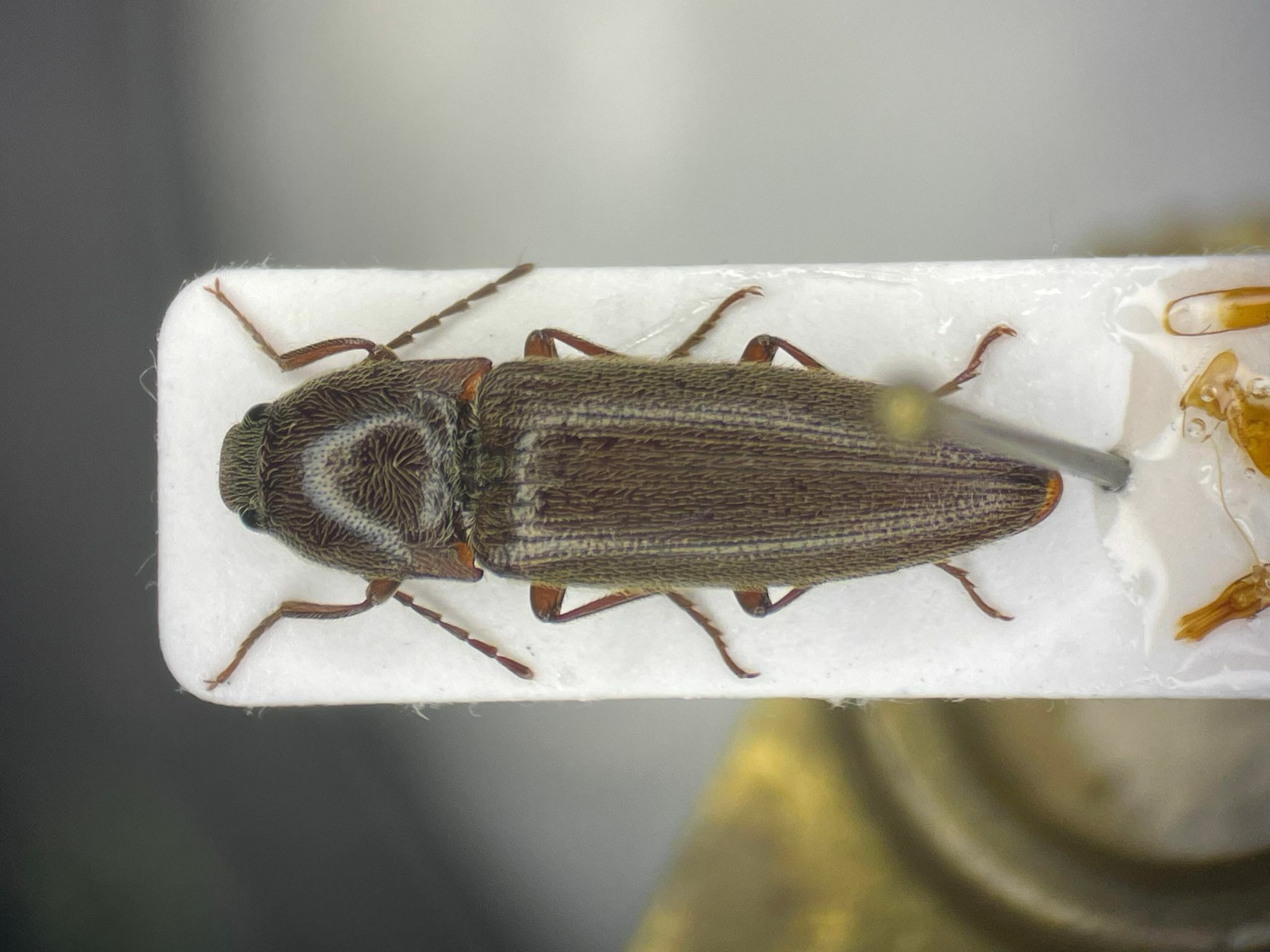
Melanotus morosus, Canada

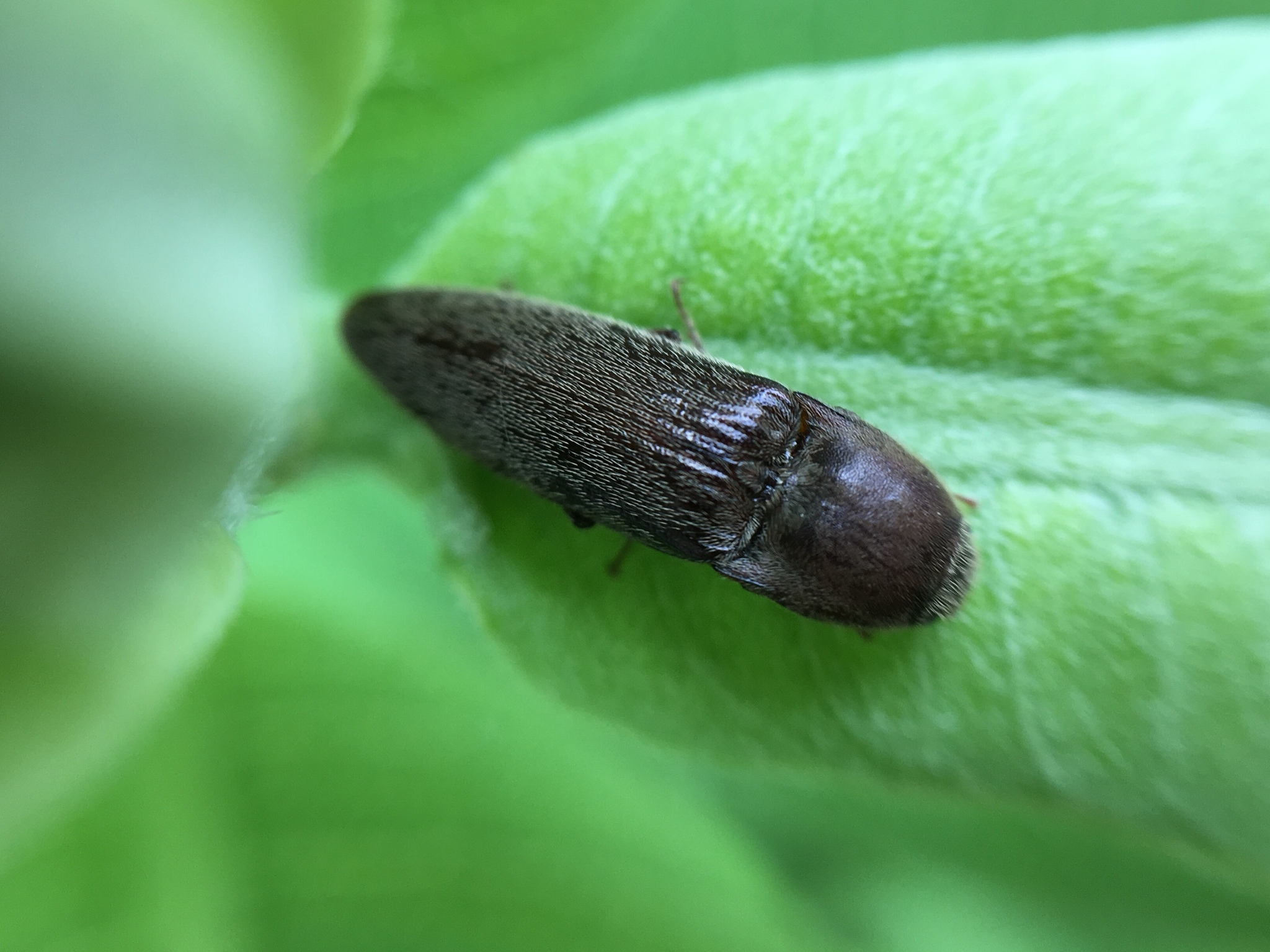
Melanotus opacicollis, Nebraska

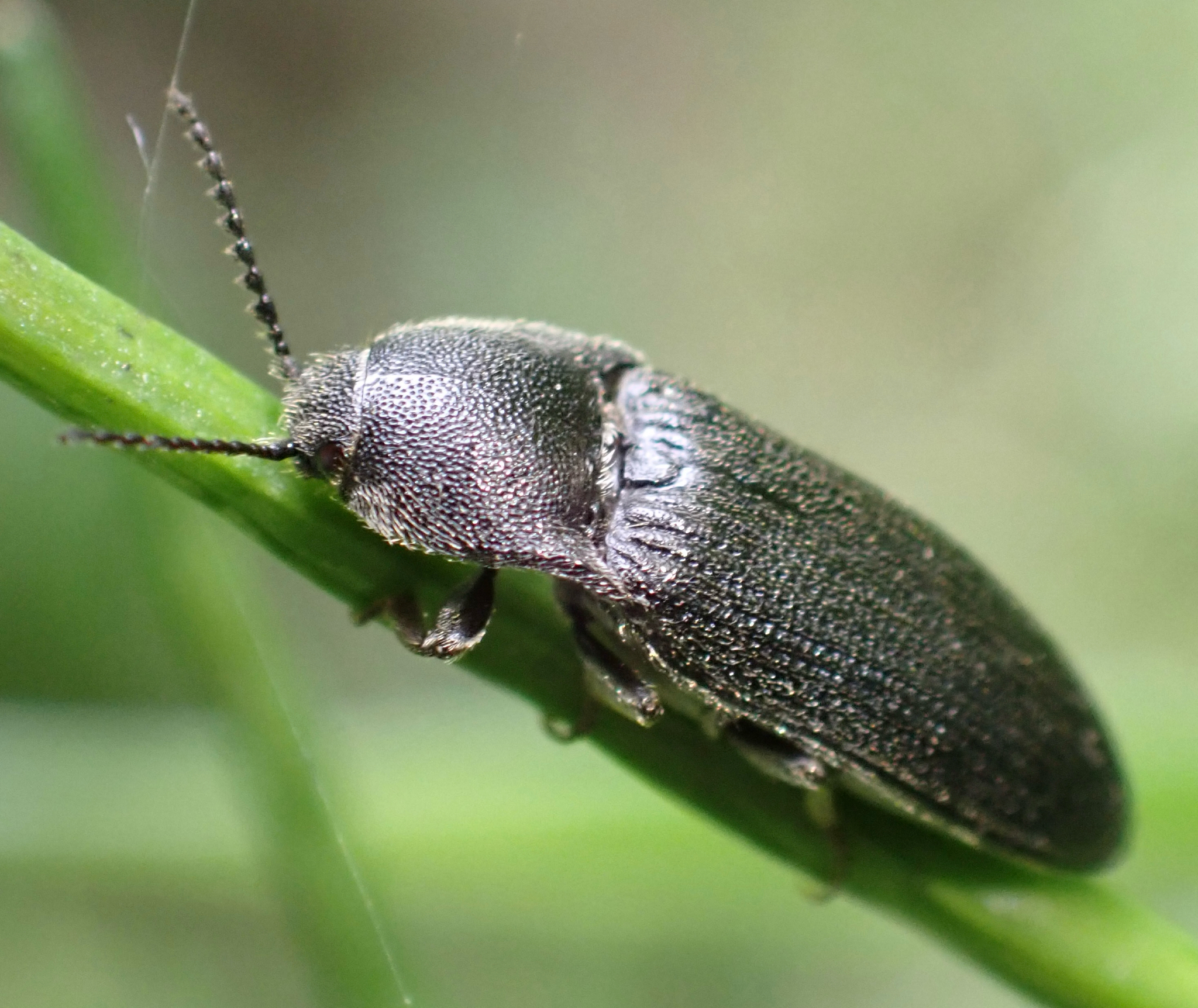
Melanotus punctolineatus, Netherlands

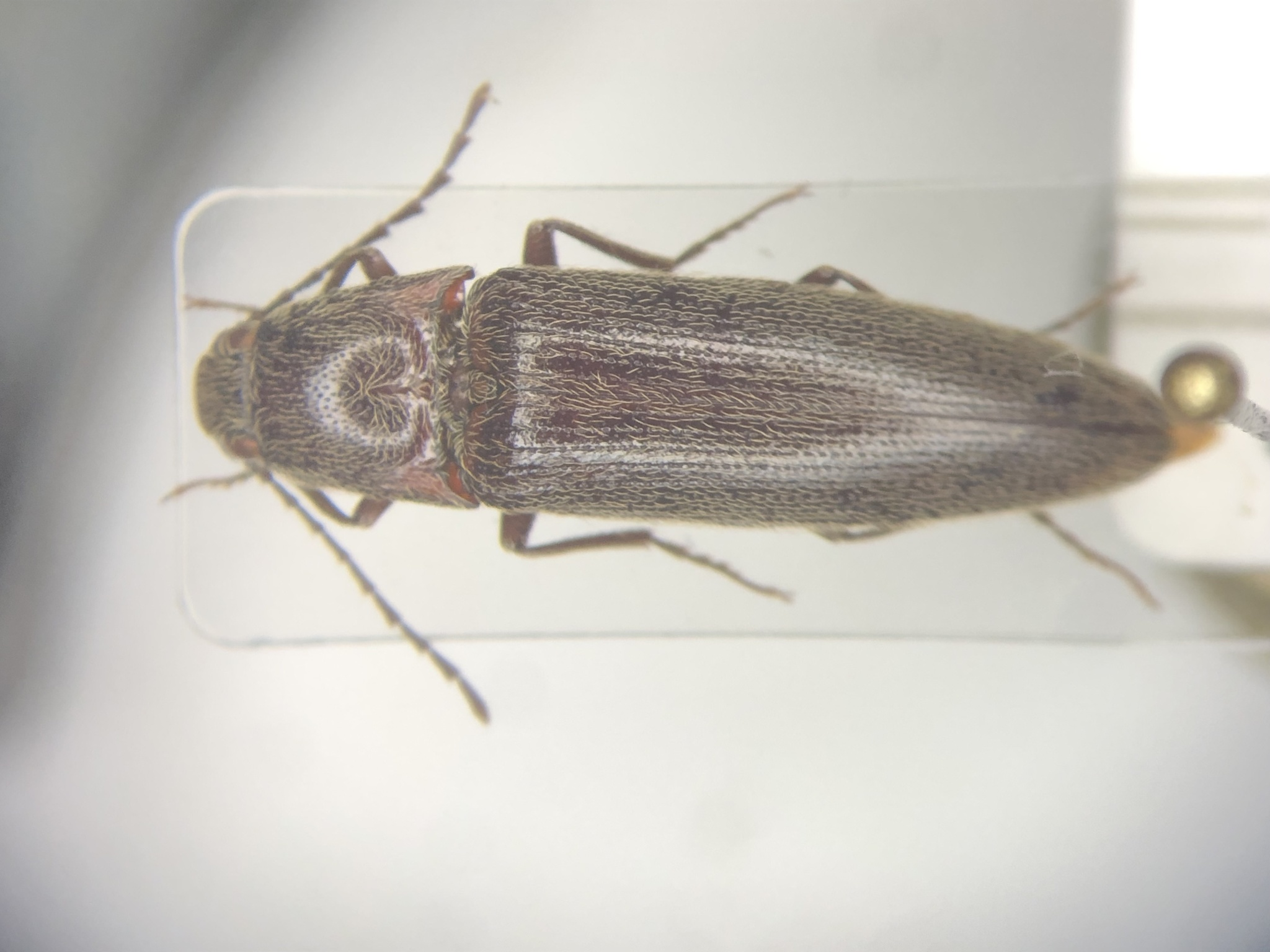
Melanotus sagittarius, Canada

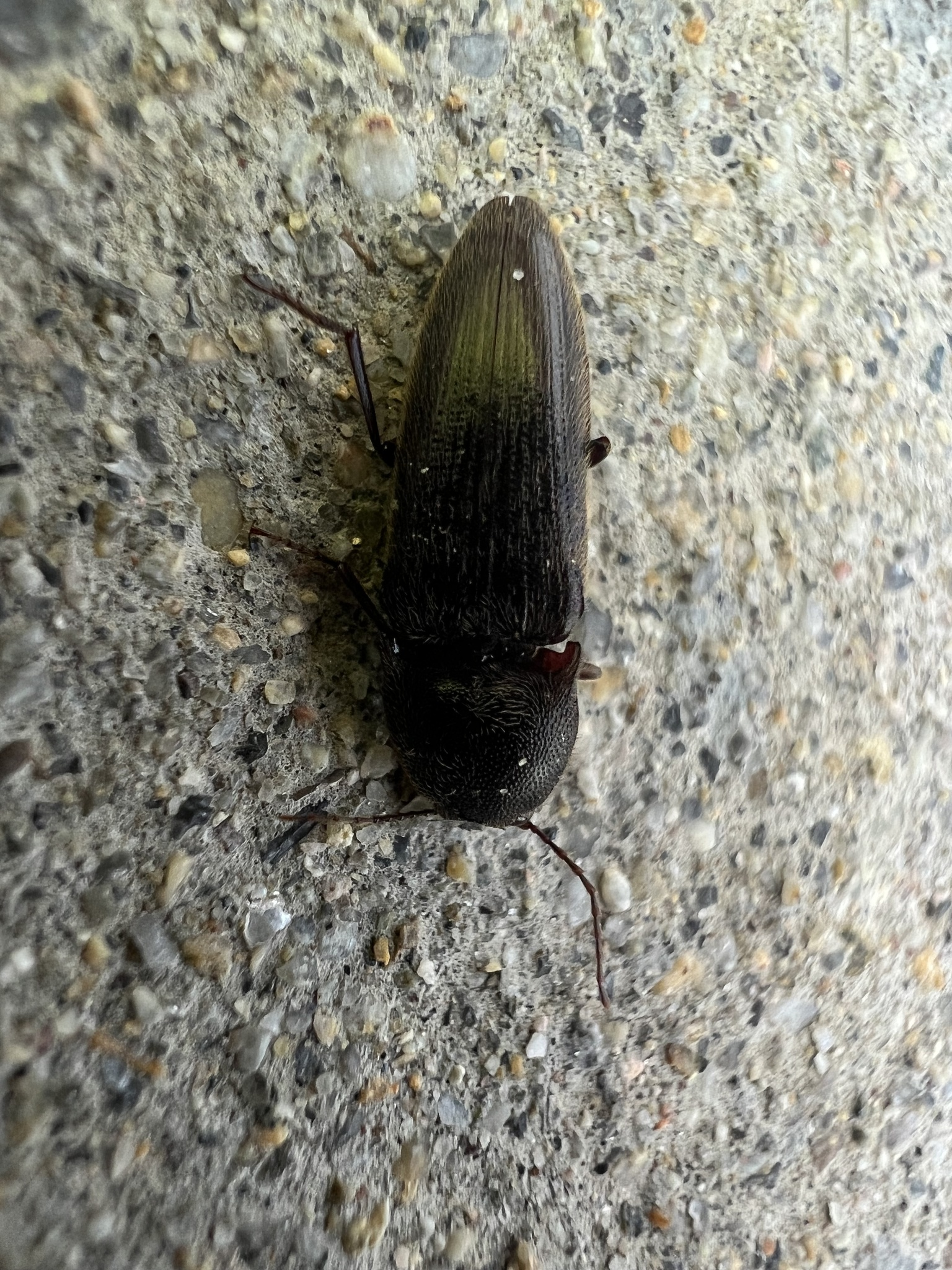
Melanotus similis, Colorado

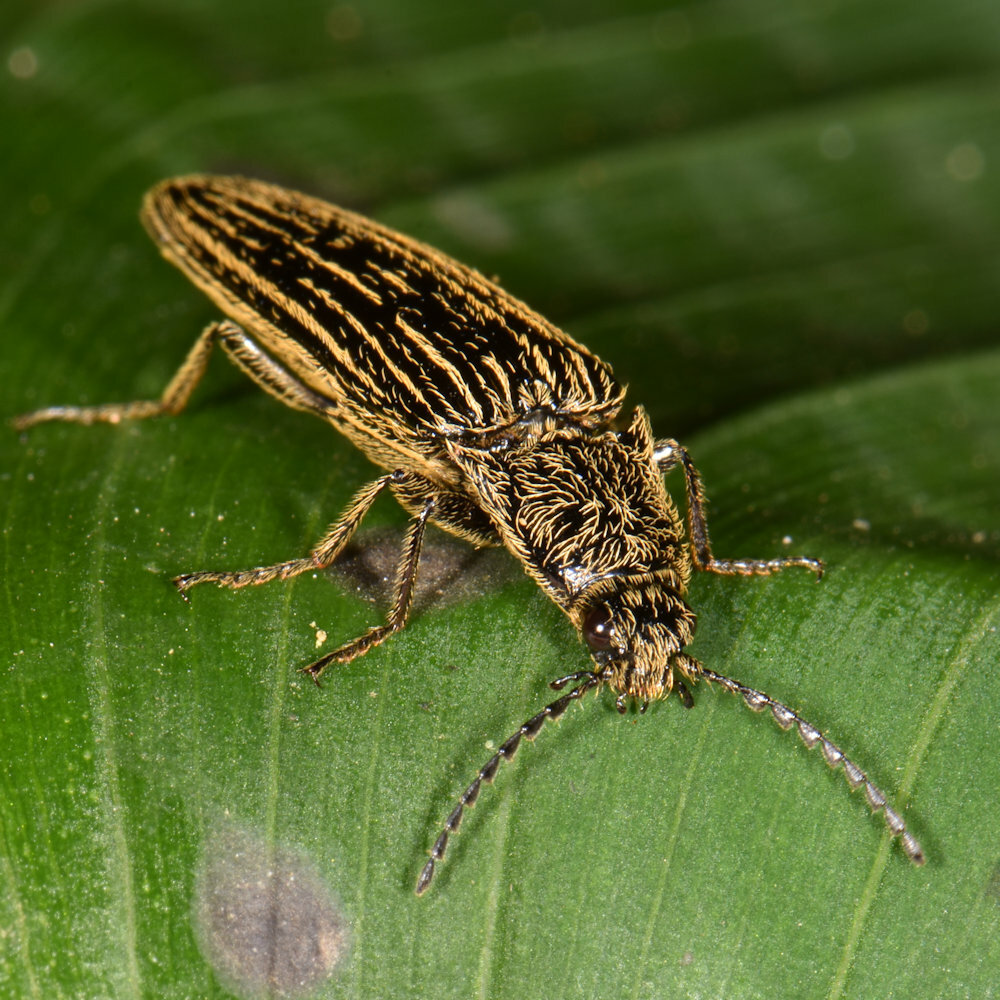
Melanotus staudingeri, Costa Rica

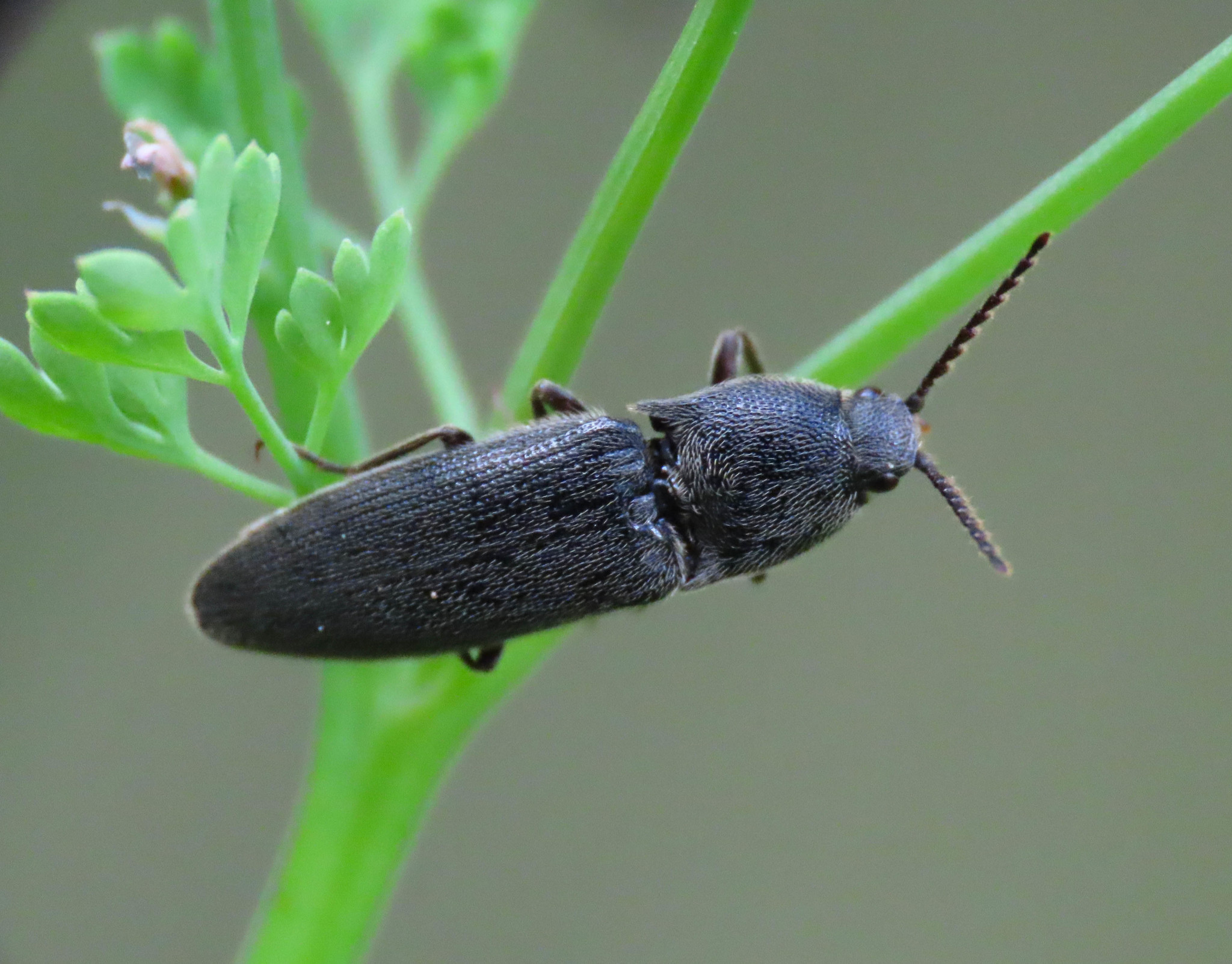
Melanotus tenebrosus, Italy

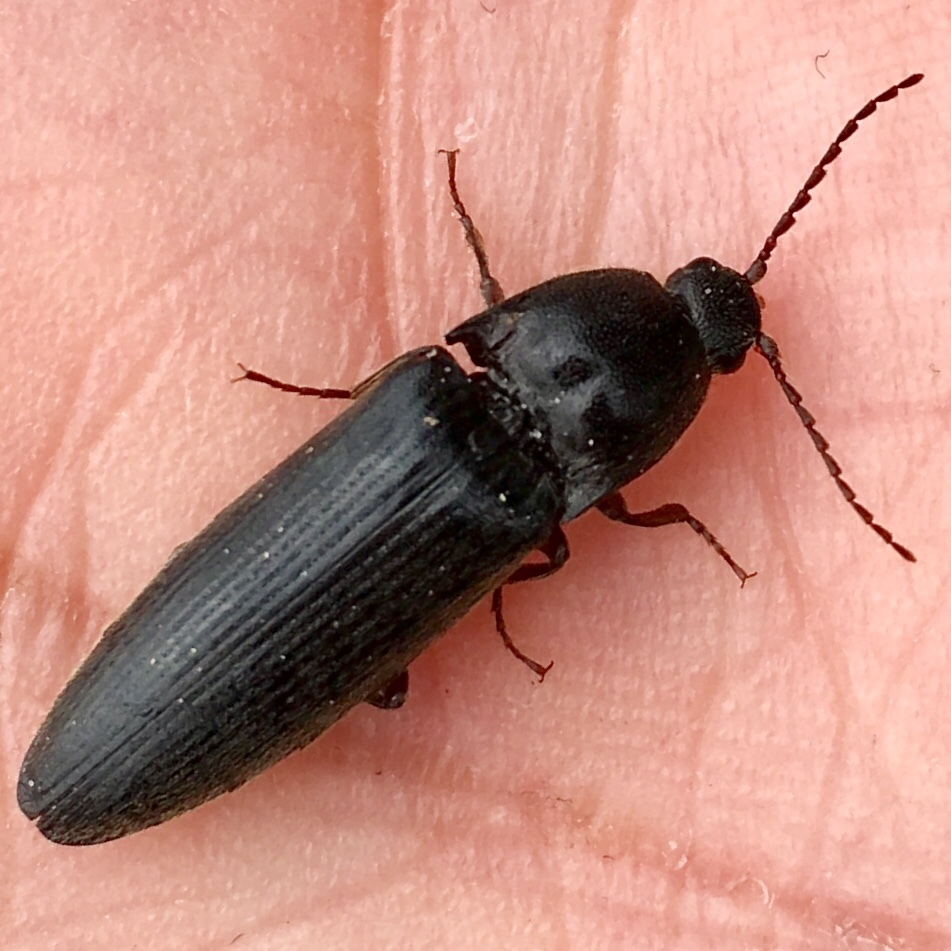
Melanotus villosus, Sweden
