= Melanotus punctosus =

Scientific classification
- Kingdom: Animalia
- Phylum: Arthropoda
- Class: Insecta
- Order: Coleoptera
- Suborder: Polyphaga
- Infraorder: Elateriformia
- Family: Elateridae
- Subfamily: Elaterinae
- Tribe: Ampedini
- Genus: Melanotus
- Species: M. punctosus

Binomial name
- Melanotus punctosus (Walker, 1858)

Synonyms
- Melanotus foliatus Vats & Chauhan, 1991; Melanotus (Spheniscosomus) haemorrhous Candèze, 1860; Melanotus punctorotundus Vats & Chauhan, 1991

Species of beetle

Melanotus punctosus, is a species of click beetle found in India, Sri Lanka, Pakistan, and Hawaii.

== Description ==
In adults, the length ranges from 12 to 18 mm and is completely black and glossy, except for the legs and antennae, which have a ferruginous brown color. On the head, it has eyes that are slightly narrower than the anterior margin of the pronotum. The pronotum of the beetle is longer than broader and has heterogeneous punctations. In males, the aedeagus has a long median lobe and basally broad parameres.
