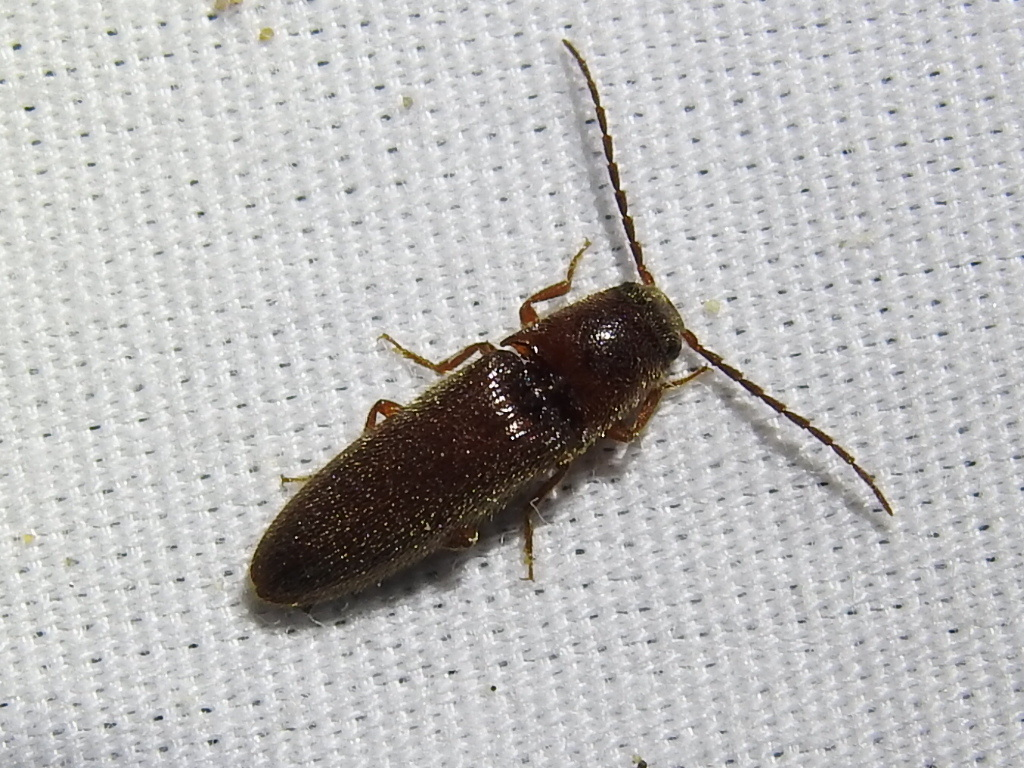
- Dipropus simplex, Texas

Scientific classification
- Domain: Eukaryota
- Kingdom: Animalia
- Phylum: Arthropoda
- Class: Insecta
- Order: Coleoptera
- Suborder: Polyphaga
- Infraorder: Elateriformia
- Family: Elateridae
- Subfamily: Elaterinae
- Tribe: Ampedini
- Subtribe: Dicrepidiina
- Genus: Dipropus
- Species: D. simplex

Binomial name
- Dipropus simplex (LeConte, 1853)

Synonyms
- Dicrepidius simplex LeConte, 1853

= Dipropus simplex =

Species of click beetle

Dipropus simplex is a species of click beetle in the family Elateridae, found in the southern United States and Mexico.
