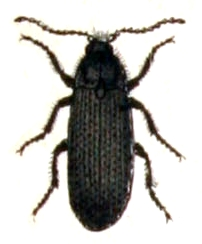

Scientific classification
- Kingdom: Animalia
- Phylum: Arthropoda
- Class: Insecta
- Order: Coleoptera
- Suborder: Polyphaga
- Infraorder: Elateriformia
- Family: Elateridae
- Genus: Melanotus
- Species: M. punctolineatus

Binomial name
- Melanotus punctolineatus Pelerin, 1829

= Melanotus punctolineatus =

Species of beetle

Melanotus punctolineatus, commonly known as the sandwich click beetle, is a species of beetle from the family Elateridae and the genus Melanotus.

== Description ==
Adult size is 11–16 millimetres (0.43–0.63 in). The color of a body, legs, and antennas are black. The body is also elongated. The elytron is tapering, which is more noticeable among males. Males have longer antennas and prothorax than females.
