= Melanotus fuscus =

Scientific classification
- Kingdom: Animalia
- Phylum: Arthropoda
- Class: Insecta
- Order: Coleoptera
- Suborder: Polyphaga
- Infraorder: Elateriformia
- Family: Elateridae
- Genus: Melanotus
- Species: M. fuscus

Binomial name
- Melanotus fuscus (Fabricius, 1801)

Synonyms
- Elater fuscus Fabricius, 1801; Melanotus fuscus Candeze, 1860

Species of beetle

Melanotus fuscus, is a species of click beetle found in India, China, Indonesia, Laos, Myanmar, Sri Lanka, Cambodia and Thailand.
