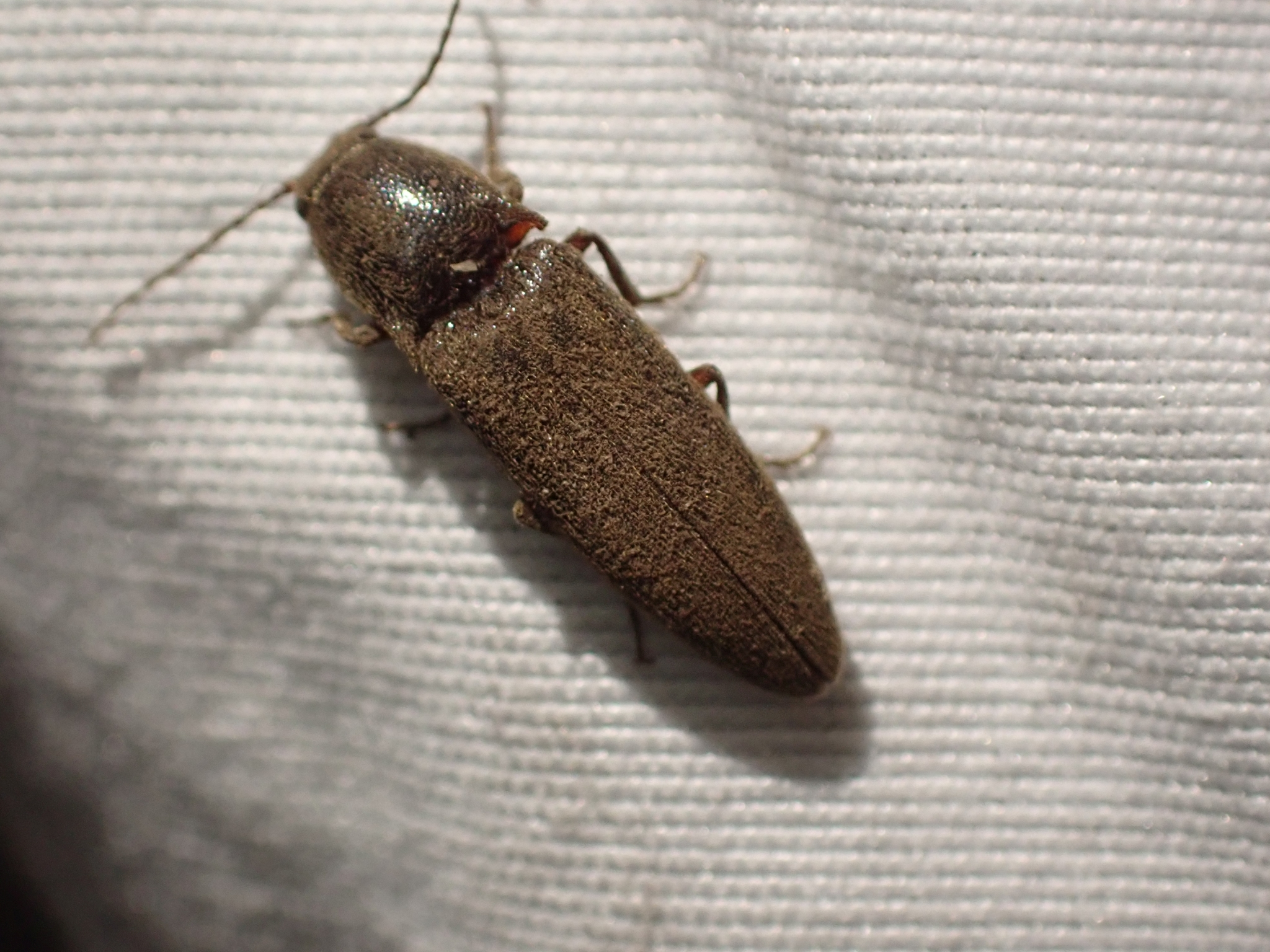
- Melanotus longulus oregonensis, Canada

Scientific classification
- Domain: Eukaryota
- Kingdom: Animalia
- Phylum: Arthropoda
- Class: Insecta
- Order: Coleoptera
- Suborder: Polyphaga
- Infraorder: Elateriformia
- Family: Elateridae
- Genus: Melanotus
- Species: M. longulus

Binomial name
- Melanotus longulus (LeConte, 1853)

= Melanotus longulus =

Species of beetle

Melanotus longulus is a species of click beetle in the family Elateridae.

== Subspecies ==
These two subspecies belong to the species Melanotus longulus:

- Melanotus longulus longulus
- Melanotus longulus oregonensis (Leconte)
