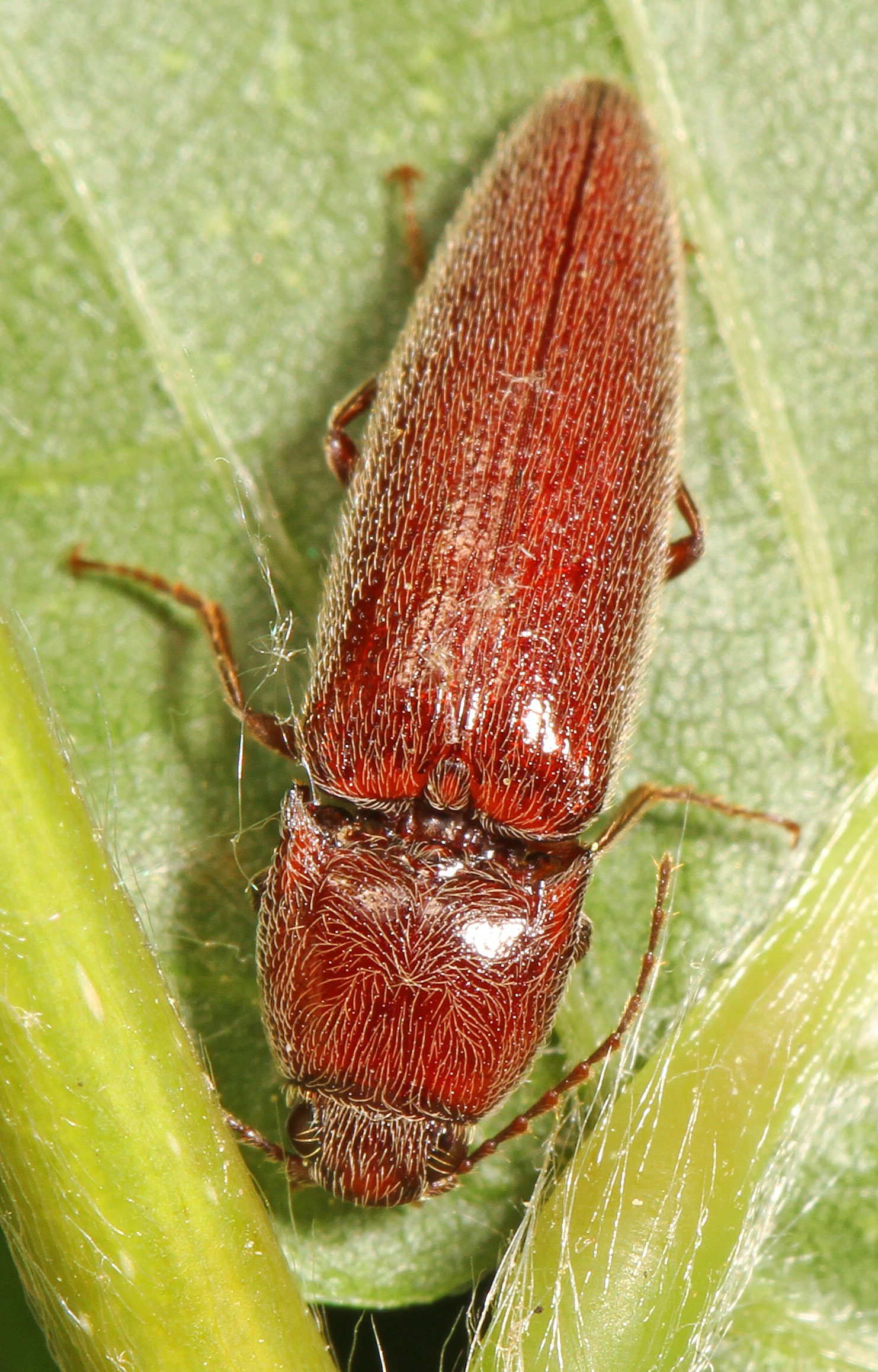

Scientific classification
- Kingdom: Animalia
- Phylum: Arthropoda
- Class: Insecta
- Order: Coleoptera
- Suborder: Polyphaga
- Infraorder: Elateriformia
- Family: Elateridae
- Genus: Melanotus
- Species: M. communis

Binomial name
- Melanotus communis (Gyllenhal, 1817)

Synonyms
- Elater communis Gyllenhal, 1817

= Melanotus communis =

Species of beetle

Melanotus communis is a species of click beetle. The adult beetle is reddish-brown in color, and is about 13 millimetres (0.51 in) long. The egg is white in color, and is about 0.3 mm (0.012 in) long. The larva is a short-legged wireworm. It is a pale yellow to reddish-brown in color, and is 21–25 mm (0.83–0.98 in) long when mature. The pupa is white in color, and is about the same size as an adult.
