= Melanotus brunniopacus =

Scientific classification
- Domain: Eukaryota
- Kingdom: Animalia
- Phylum: Arthropoda
- Class: Insecta
- Order: Coleoptera
- Suborder: Polyphaga
- Infraorder: Elateriformia
- Family: Elateridae
- Genus: Melanotus
- Species: M. brunniopacus

Binomial name
- Melanotus brunniopacus Kishii, 1989

Species of beetle

Melanotus brunniopacus is a species of beetle in the Elateridae family. The scientific name of this species was first published 1989 by Kishii.
