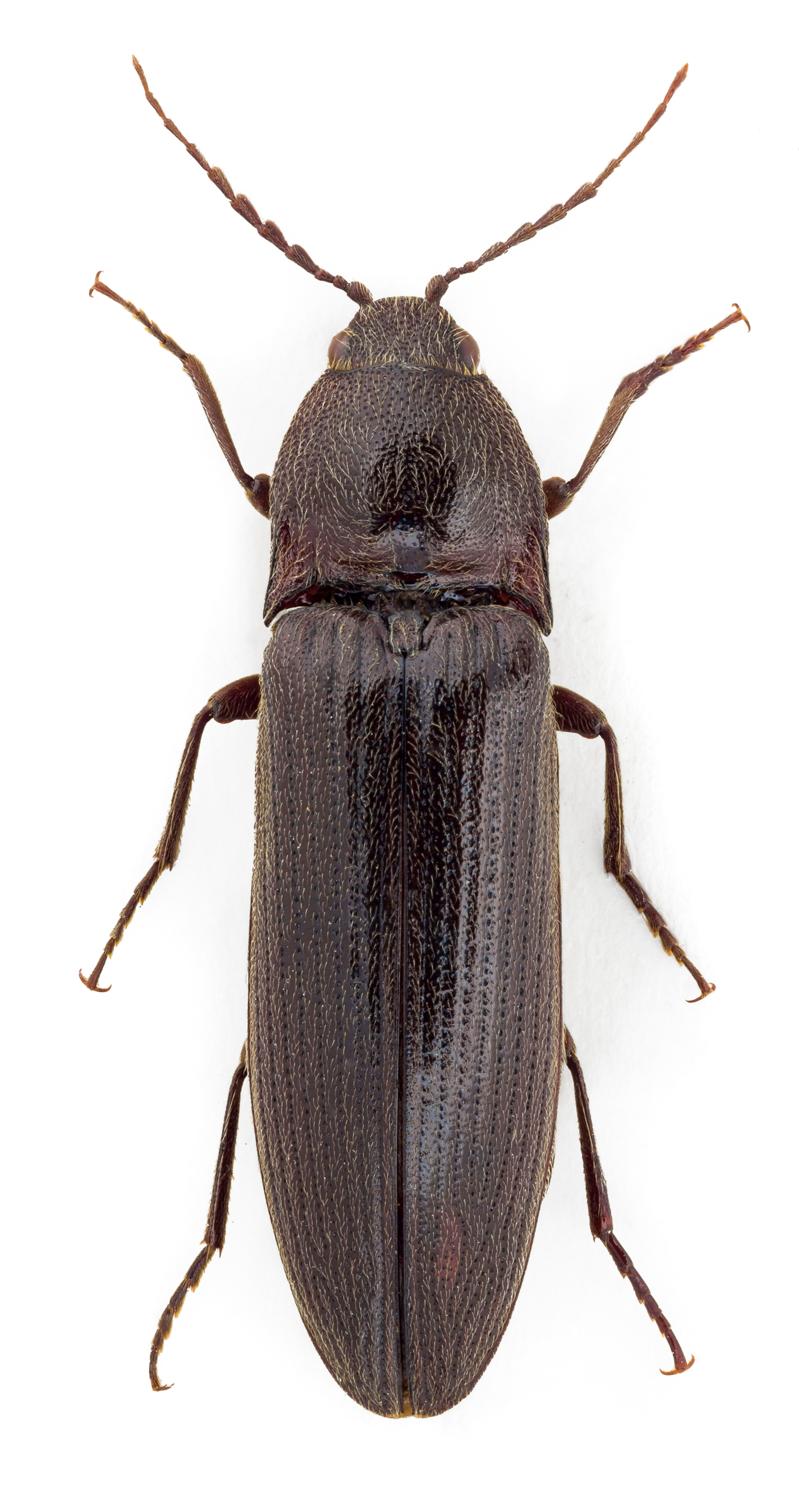
- A female

Scientific classification
- Kingdom: Animalia
- Phylum: Arthropoda
- Clade: Pancrustacea
- Class: Insecta
- Order: Coleoptera
- Suborder: Polyphaga
- Infraorder: Elateriformia
- Family: Elateridae
- Genus: Melanotus
- Species: M. castanipes

Binomial name
- Melanotus castanipes (Paykull, 1800)

= Melanotus castanipes =

Species of beetle

Melanotus castanipes is a species of click beetle in the family Elateridae.

== Description ==
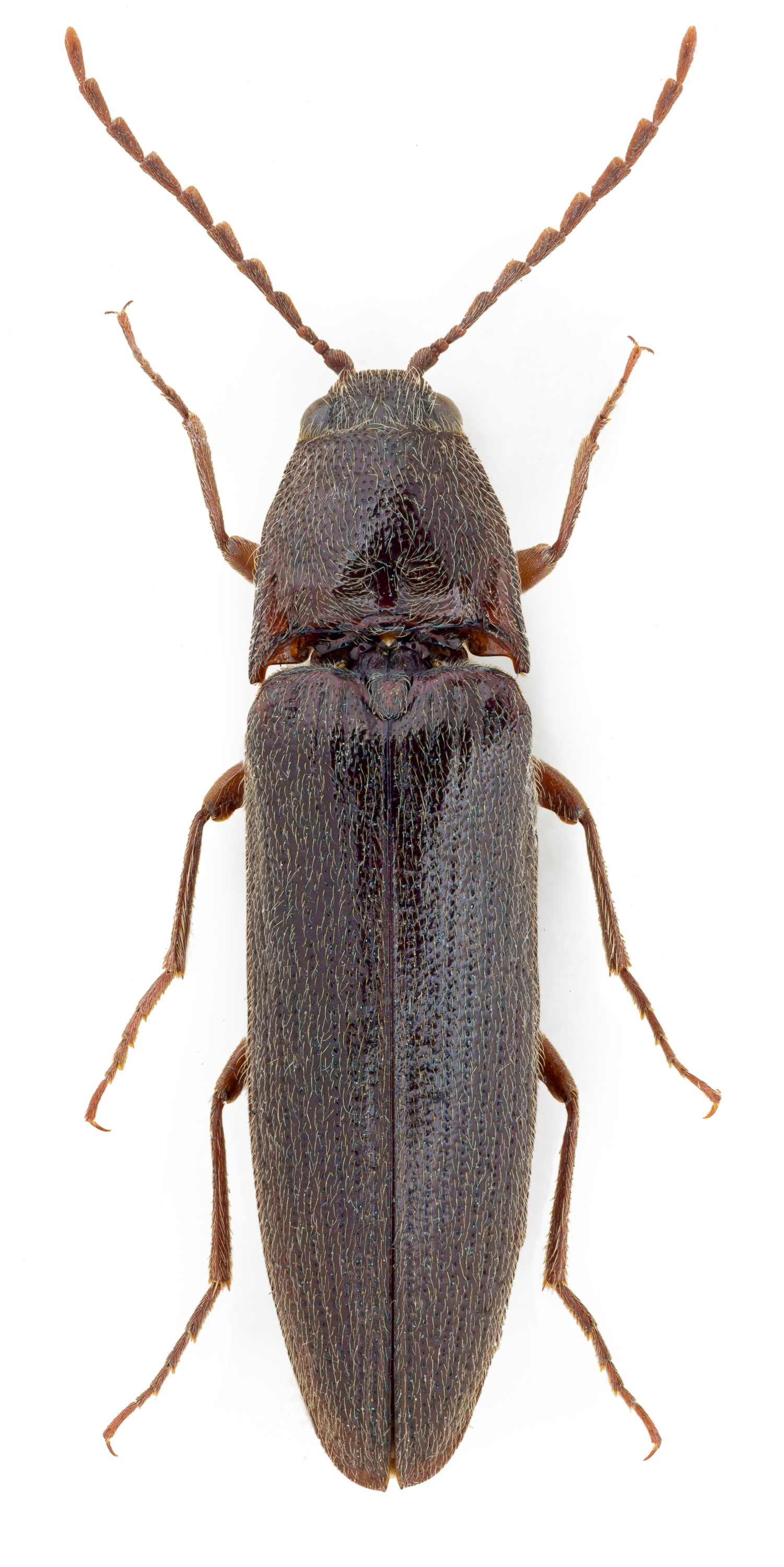
A male

Length varies from 13 to 19 mm. It is uniformly black, or with slightly browner head with an elongated body and tapering elytra. Longitudinal rows of pits are obvious, as are densely scattered pits on the pronotum. The legs and antennae are black and the antennae are long, extending a way beyond the posterior margin of the pronotum, slightly shorter in the female.
