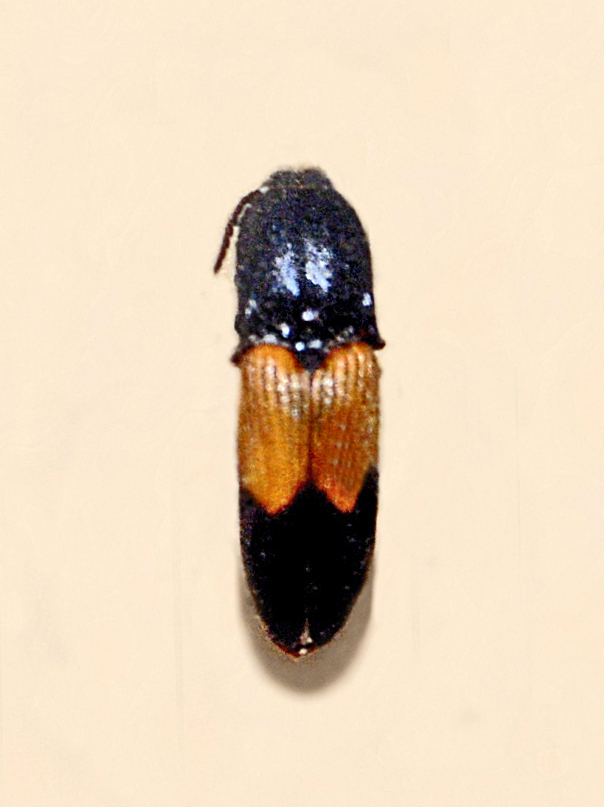
- Anilicus semiflavus

Scientific classification
- Kingdom: Animalia
- Phylum: Arthropoda
- Class: Insecta
- Order: Coleoptera
- Suborder: Polyphaga
- Infraorder: Elateriformia
- Family: Elateridae
- Subfamily: Elaterinae
- Genus: Anilicus; Candèze, 1863

= Anilicus =

Genus of beetles

Anilicus is a genus of beetles in the click beetle family.

== Description ==
Body is oblong, parallel-sided and flattened. These beetles are characterized by a bicolorous black and orange or red coloration.

== Distribution ==
They are endemic to Central and coastal eastern Australia and south-western Australia.

== Species ==
- Anilicus attenuatus Candèze, 1863
- Anilicus loricatus Candèze, 1863
- Anilicus parvus Gullan, 1977
- Anilicus rectilineatus Gullan, 1977
- Anilicus semiflavus (Germar, 1844)
- Anilicus xanthomus (W.S. Macleay, 1826)
