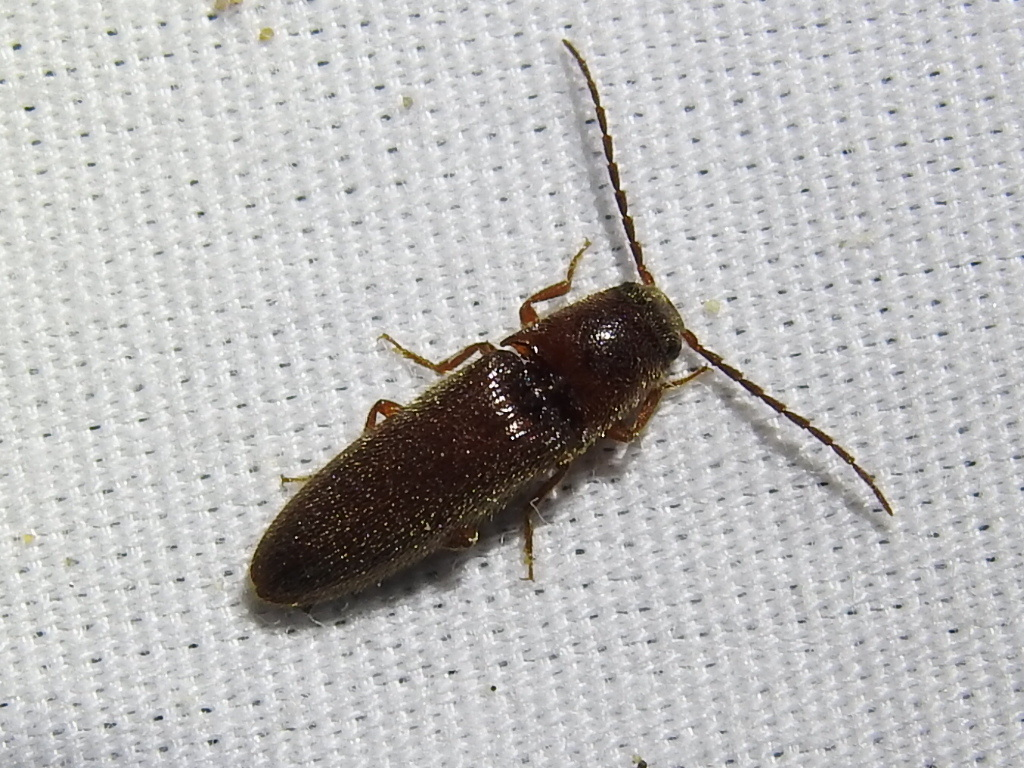
- Dipropus simplex, Texas

Scientific classification
- Domain: Eukaryota
- Kingdom: Animalia
- Phylum: Arthropoda
- Class: Insecta
- Order: Coleoptera
- Suborder: Polyphaga
- Infraorder: Elateriformia
- Family: Elateridae
- Subfamily: Elaterinae
- Tribe: Ampedini
- Subtribe: Dicrepidiina
- Genus: Dipropus; Germar, 1839

= Dipropus =

Genus of beetles

Dipropus is a genus of click beetles in the family Elateridae. There are around 150 described species in Dipropus, found in North, Central, and South America.

== Species ==
These species, among others, belong to the genus Dipropus:

- Dipropus alopex (Fabricius, 1801)
- Dipropus amarakaeri Johnson, 2018
- Dipropus anceps (Candèze, 1859)
- Dipropus angustatus (Champion, 1895)
- Dipropus asper (LeConte, 1878)
- Dipropus atricornis (Champion, 1895)
- Dipropus badius (Candèze, 1859)
- Dipropus bifasciatus (Champion, 1895)
- Dipropus brasilianus (Germar, 1824)
- Dipropus brunneus (Candèze, 1859)
- Dipropus chloropterus (Erichson, 1848)
- Dipropus deletus (Candèze, 1859)
- Dipropus erythroderus (Candèze, 1878)
- Dipropus ferreus (LeConte, 1853)
- Dipropus inornatus (Candèze, 1859)
- Dipropus laticollis (Eschscholtz, 1829)
- Dipropus latus (Candèze, 1859)
- Dipropus losamigos Johnson, 2018
- Dipropus melas (Champion, 1895)
- Dipropus metallicus (Champion, 1895)
- Dipropus nigrita (Candèze, 1859)
- Dipropus pericu Johnson, 2016
- Dipropus porosus (Erichson, 1848)
- Dipropus puberulus (Boheman, 1858)
- Dipropus punctatus (Candèze, 1859)
- Dipropus puncticollis (Fabricius, 1801)
- Dipropus reinae Johnson 2016
- Dipropus rufulus (Candèze, 1859)
- Dipropus schwarzi (Becker, 1961)
- Dipropus simplex (LeConte, 1853)
- Dipropus soleatus (Say, 1834)
- Dipropus sonora Johnson 2016
- Dipropus subsericeus (Candèze, 1859)
- Dipropus subsericeus (Candèze, 1859)
- Dipropus sus (Candèze, 1859)
- Dipropus tequesta Johnson 2017
- Dipropus warneri Johnson 2016
- Dipropus yaqui Johnson 2016
