= Melanotus cribriventris =

Scientific classification
- Kingdom: Animalia
- Phylum: Arthropoda
- Class: Insecta
- Order: Coleoptera
- Suborder: Polyphaga
- Infraorder: Elateriformia
- Family: Elateridae
- Genus: Melanotus
- Species: M. cribriventris

Binomial name
- Melanotus cribriventris Blatchley, 1910

Synonyms
- Melanotus longicornis Candèze, 1860

Species of beetle

Melanotus cribriventris, is a species of click beetle found in India, Sri Lanka, China and USA.

== Description ==
Body length is about 10 mm. Length of elytra is 7.5 mm.
