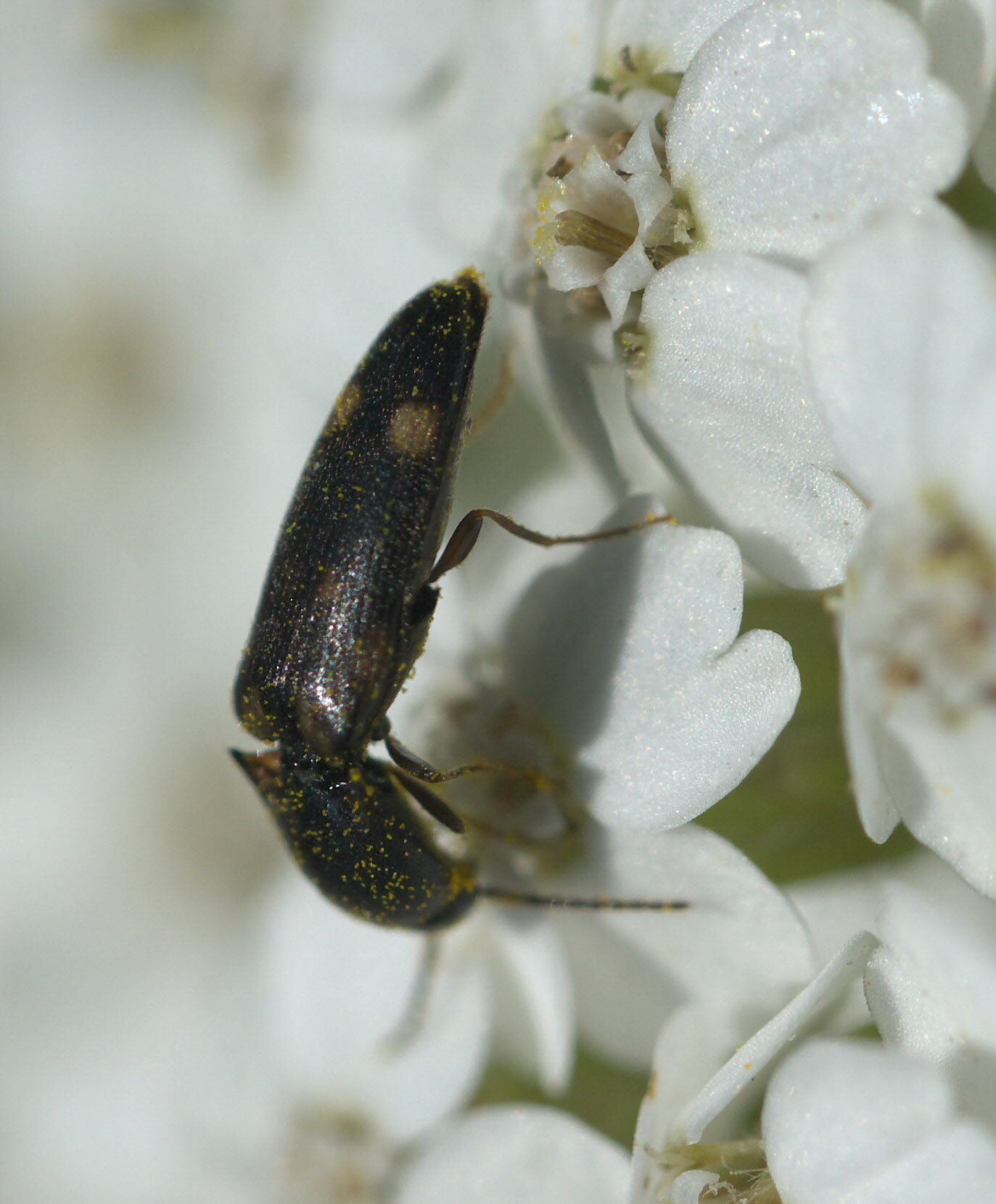
- Megapenthes caprella

Scientific classification
- Kingdom: Animalia
- Phylum: Arthropoda
- Class: Insecta
- Order: Coleoptera
- Suborder: Polyphaga
- Infraorder: Elateriformia
- Family: Elateridae
- Subfamily: Elaterinae; Leach, 1815

Tribes
- Agriotini; Ampedini; Aplastini; Cebrionini; Dicrepidiini; Elaterini; Megapenthini; Melanotini; Odontonychini; Physorhinini; Pomachiliini; Synaptini

= Elaterinae =

Subfamily of beetles

Elaterinae is a subfamily of click beetles in the family Elateridae, containing 12 tribes worldwide.

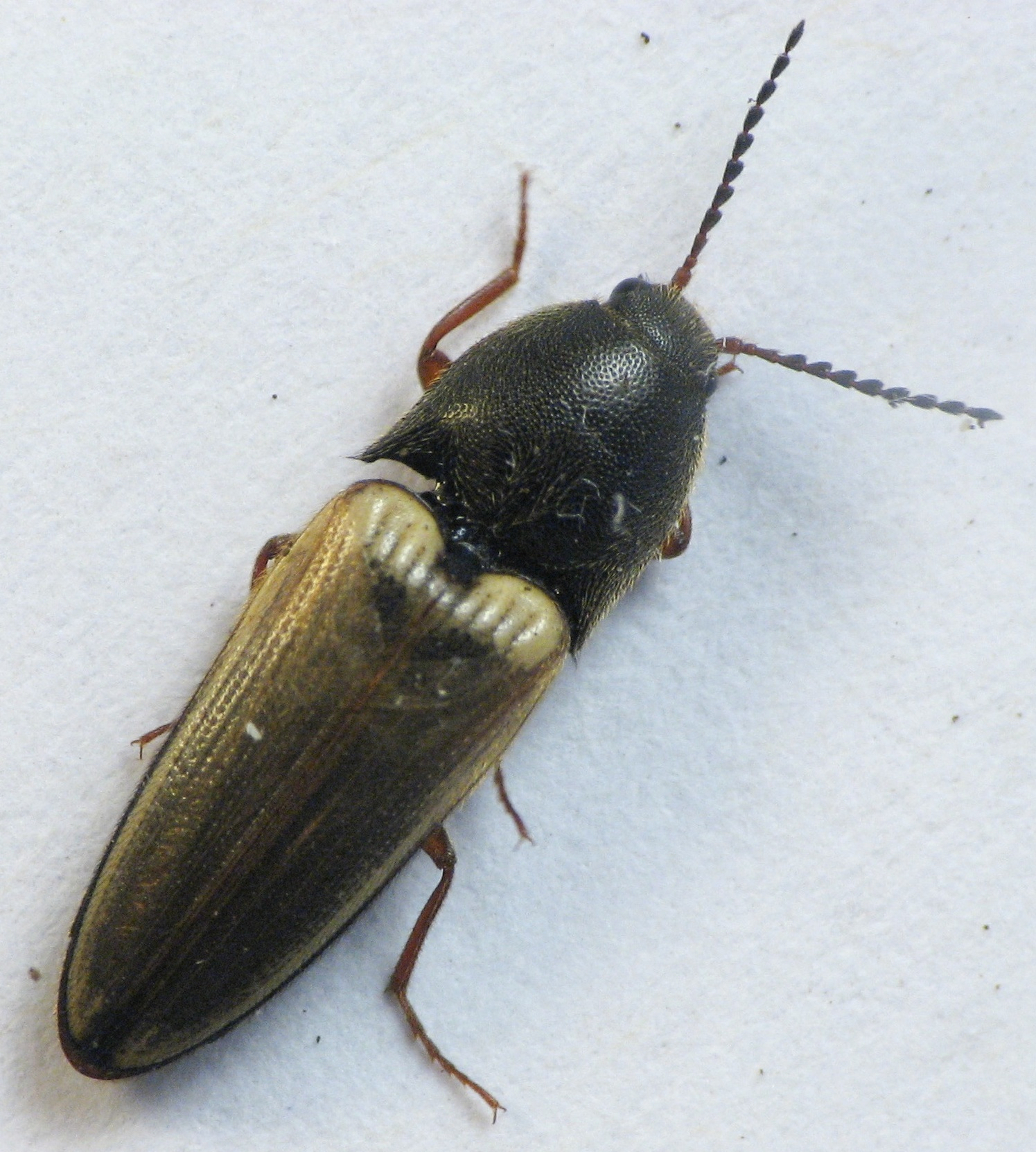
Ampedus nigricollis

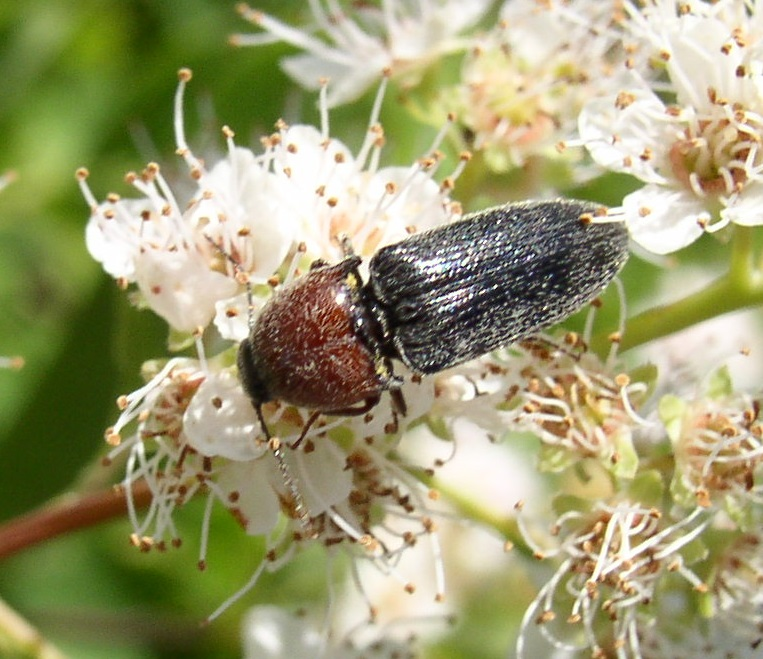
Melanotus leonardi

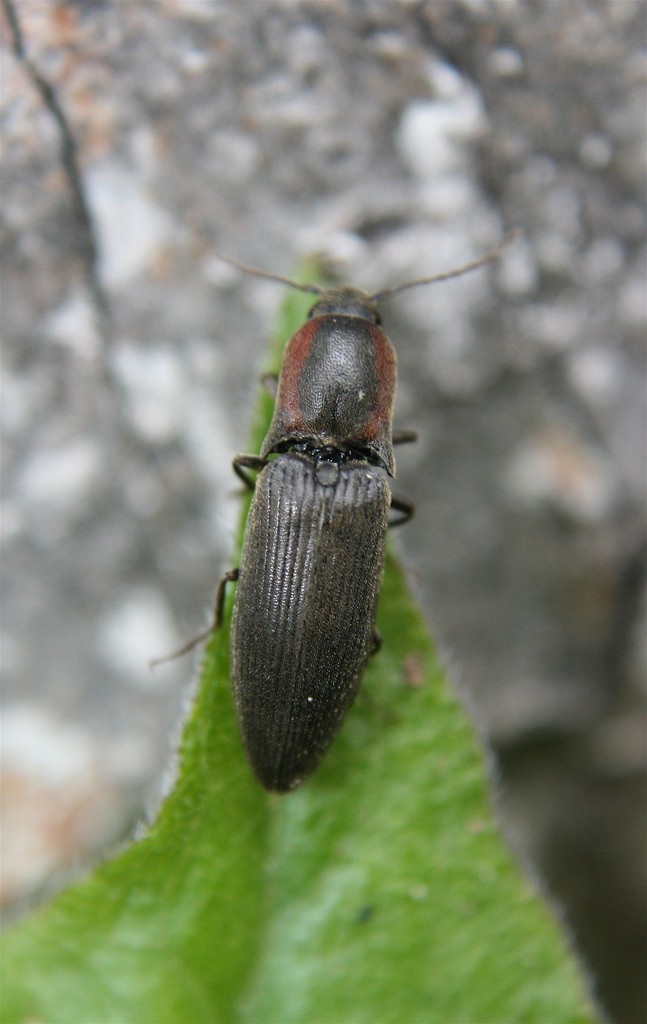
Agriotes fucosus

== Selected genera ==
- Agriotes
- Ampedus
- Anchastus
- Anilicus
- Aplastus
- Blauta Leconte, 1854
- Cebrio
- Dalopius
- Dicrepidius Eschscholtz in Thon, 1829
- Diplostethus Schwarz, 1907
- Dipropus Germar, 1839
- Dolerosomus
- Elater Linnaeus, 1758
- Glyphonyx Candèze, 1863
- Idolus
- Leptoschema Horn, 1885
- Megapenthes Kiesenwetter, 1858
- Melanotus Erichson, 1829
- Mulsanteus (brown wireworms)
- Odontonychus
- Orthostethus
- Parallelostethus
- Physorhinus
- Pomachilus
- Sericus
- Synaptus
