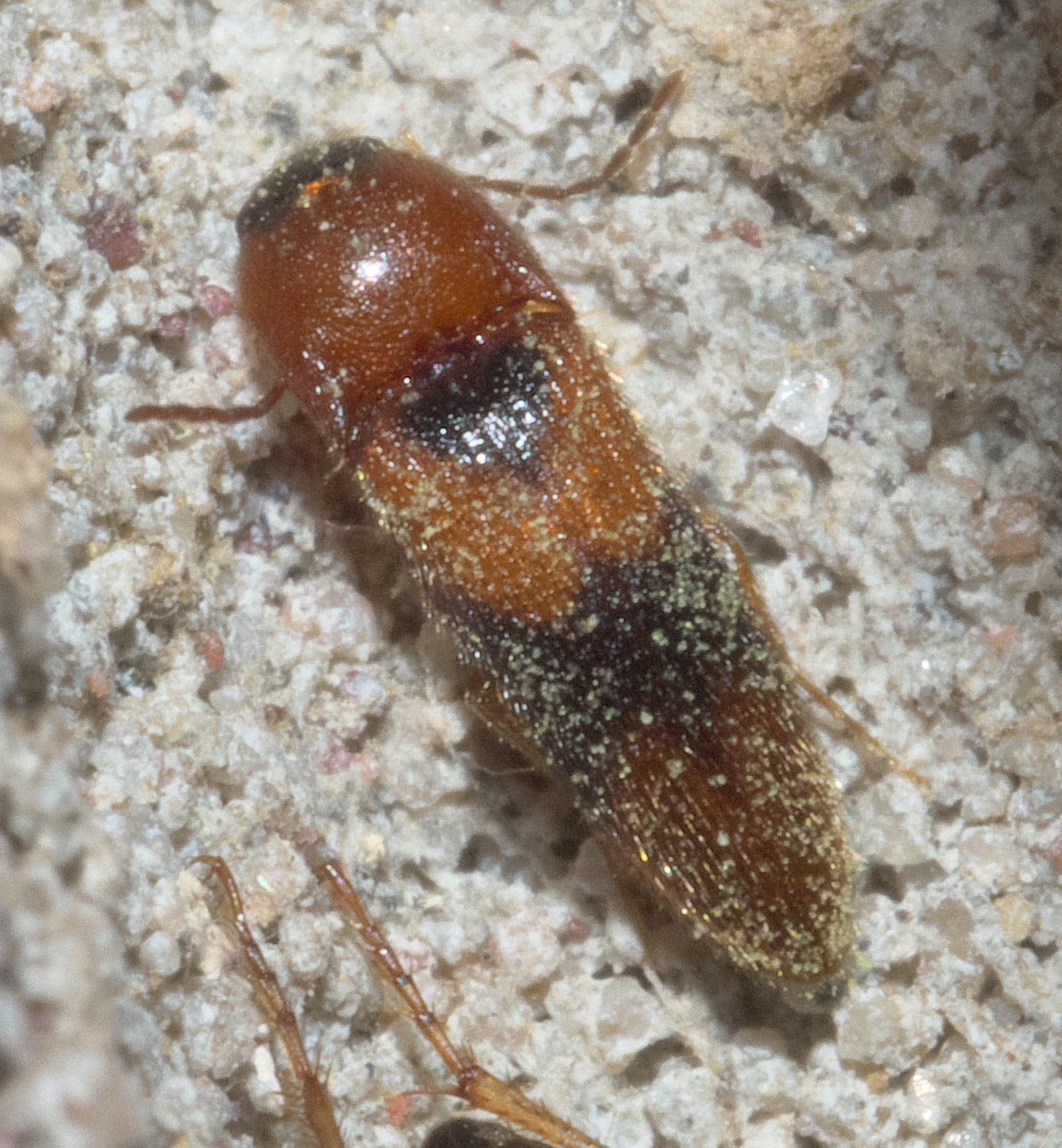
- Ampedus areolatus

Scientific classification
- Kingdom: Animalia
- Phylum: Arthropoda
- Clade: Pancrustacea
- Class: Insecta
- Order: Coleoptera
- Suborder: Polyphaga
- Infraorder: Elateriformia
- Family: Elateridae
- Subfamily: Elaterinae
- Tribe: Ampedini; Gistel, 1848

= Ampedini =

Tribe of beetles

Ampedini is a tribe of click beetles in the family Elateridae. There are about 7 genera and at least 80 described species in Ampedini.

== Genera ==
These genera belong to the tribe Ampedini:

- Ampedus Dejean, 1833^{g b}
- Anchastus LeConte, 1853^{i c g b}
- Blauta Leconte, 1854^{b}
- Dicrepidius Eschscholtz in Thon, 1829^{g b}
- Dipropus Germar, 1839^{g b}
- Lomemus Sharp, 1877
- Melanotus Erichson, 1829^{i c g b}
- Physorhinus Germar, 1840^{g b}

Data sources: i = ITIS, c = Catalogue of Life, g = GBIF, b = Bugguide.net
