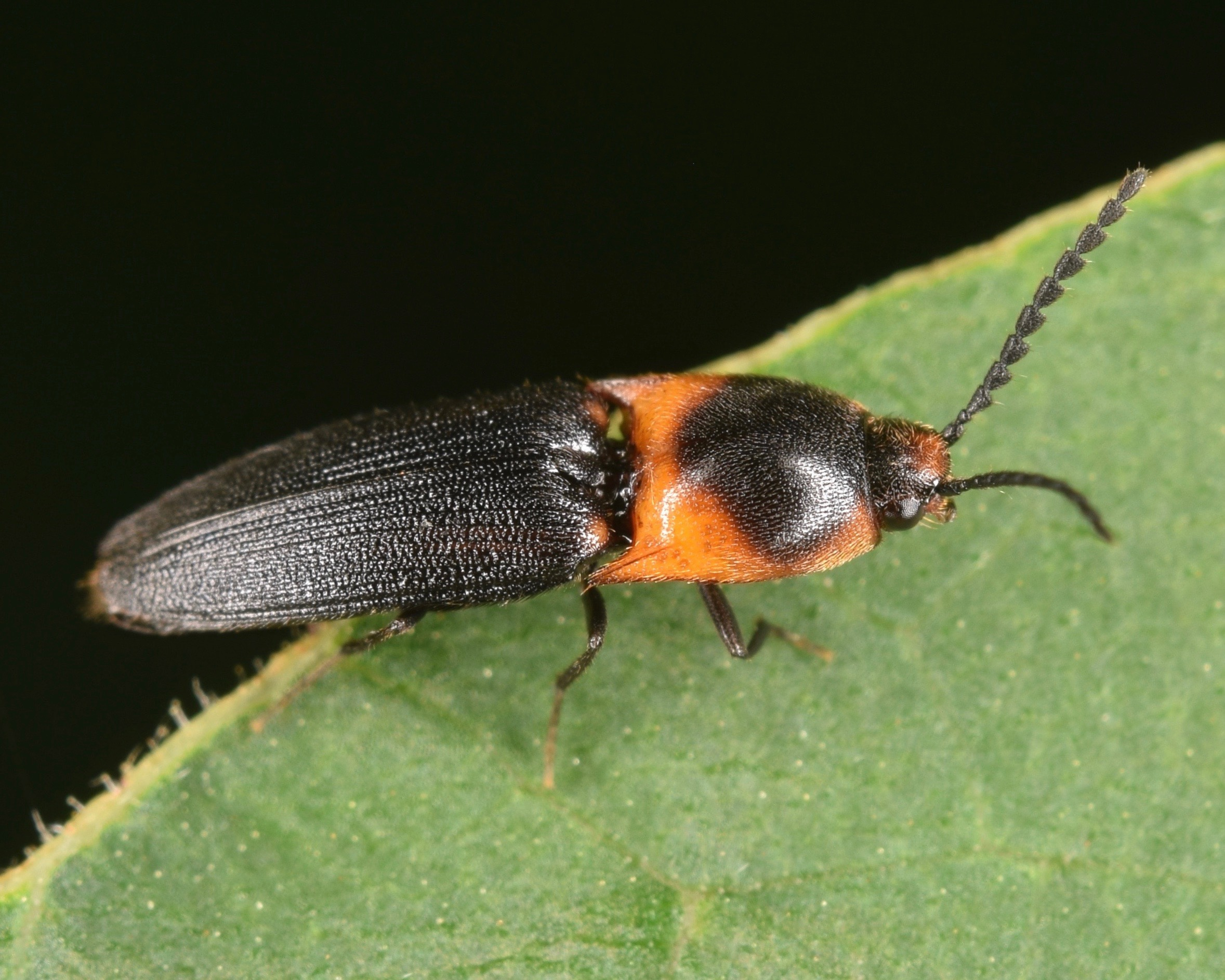
- Anchastus signaticollis

Scientific classification
- Kingdom: Animalia
- Phylum: Arthropoda
- Class: Insecta
- Order: Coleoptera
- Suborder: Polyphaga
- Infraorder: Elateriformia
- Family: Elateridae
- Genus: Anchastus; LeConte, 1853

Synonyms
- List: Abseus Fleutiaux, 1931; Anchustus Miwa, 1927; Anthastus Löding, 1945; Brachycrepis Leconte, 1854; Candezella Szombathy, 1910; Doualarhinus Laurent & Taminiaux, 1961; Elatrinus Horn, 1871

= Anchastus =

Genus of beetles

Anchastus is a genus of beetles belonging to the family Elateridae. The species of this genus are found in America, Southern Africa, Australia.

== Species ==
The following species are recognised in the genus Anchastus:

- Anchastus anthrax (Horn, 1871)
- Anchastus asper LeConte, 1878
- Anchastus bicolor LeConte, 1866
- Anchastus binus
- Anchastus boulardi Chassain, 2010
- Anchastus brulei Chassain, 2010
- Anchastus brunneofasciatus Schwarz, 1906
- Anchastus cinereipennis (Eschscholtz, 1829)
- Anchastus diluvialis Wickham, 1916
- Anchastus eruptus Wickham, 1916
- Anchastus fumicollis
- Anchastus gantieri Chassain, 2010
- Anchastus guyanensis Chassain, 2010
- Anchastus insularis Candèze, 1889
- Anchastus jamaicae Candèze, 1889
- Anchastus knulli Becker, 1972
- Anchastus marginicollis Schwarz, 1902
- Anchastus militaris Candeze
- Anchastus montisequorum Chassain, 2010
- Anchastus moratus Candèze, 1889
- Anchastus quadrimaculatus Candèze, 1889
- Anchastus sautierei Chassain, 2008
- Anchastus seminiger
- Anchastus sericans Candeze, 1891
- Anchastus signaticollis Germar, 1843
- Anchastus subdepressus Fall, 1934
- Anchastus swezeyi Van Zwaluwenburg, 1931
- Anchastus terminatus Candèze, 1864
- Anchastus touroulti Chassain, 2010
- Anchastus sp. BOLD:ABX2441
- Anchastus sp. BOLD:ACA2190
- Anchastus sp. BOLD:ACA2275
