= Melanotus =

Melanotus may refer to:

- Melanotus (beetle), a beetle genus in the family Elateridae
- Melanotus (fungus), a fungal genus in the family Strophariaceae, associated with Deconica which may be a synonym.
