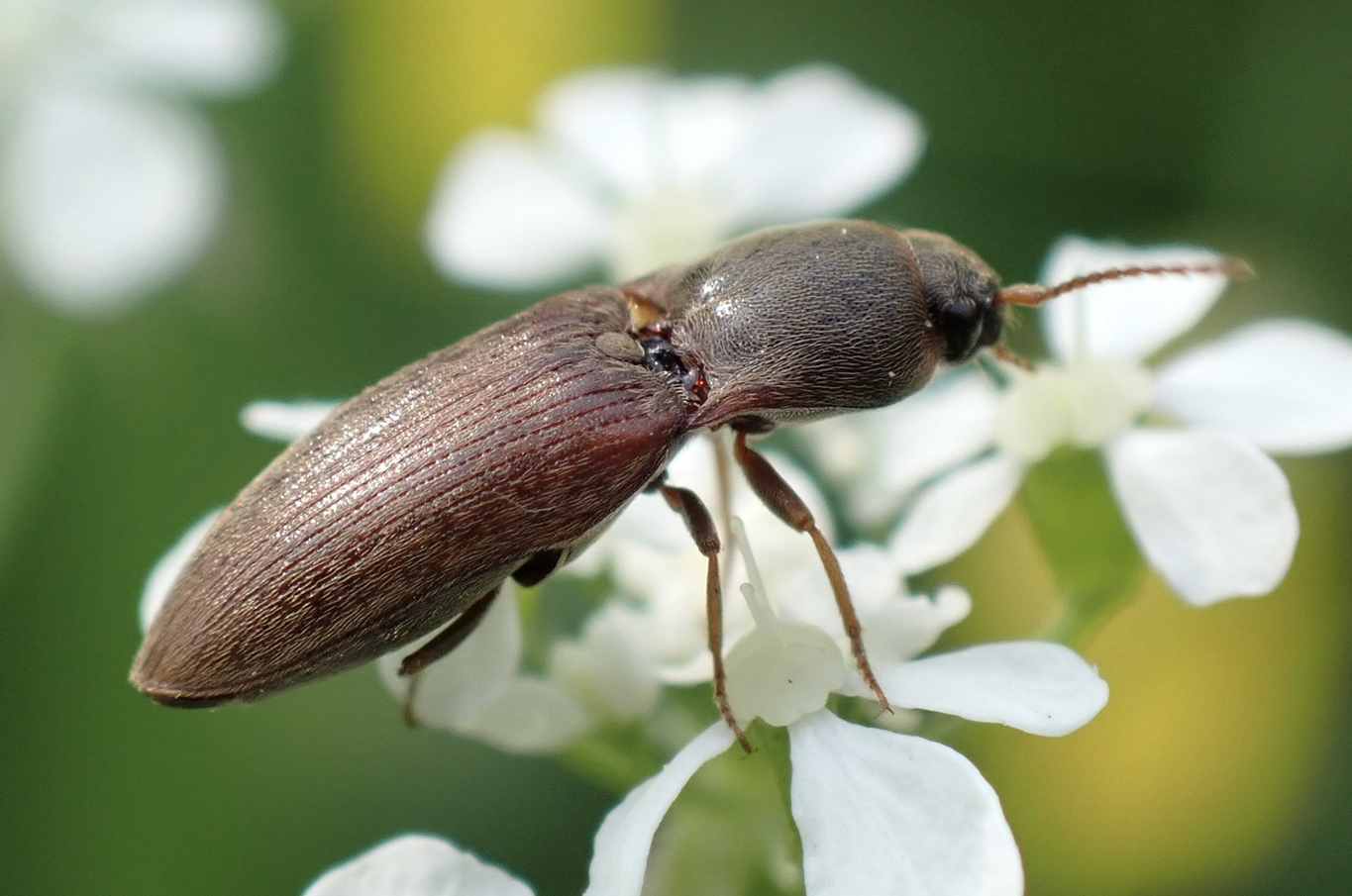
- Agriotes sputator

Scientific classification
- Kingdom: Animalia
- Phylum: Arthropoda
- Clade: Pancrustacea
- Class: Insecta
- Order: Coleoptera
- Suborder: Polyphaga
- Infraorder: Elateriformia
- Family: Elateridae
- Subfamily: Elaterinae
- Tribe: Agriotini; Laporte de Castelnau 1840

= Agriotini =

Tribe of beetles

The Agriotini is a group (tribe) of click beetles from the family of Elateridae currently (2026) with 13 genera and more than 500 species. Agriotes is the largest genus with over 350 species. The distribution of the different species of Agriotini covers most parts of Europe, Asia and the America, but not many parts of Africa and the Pacific. Further, no species seem to have established in Australia. The adults feed on flowers and foliage, whereas the larval stages are typical wireworms that live in the soil and feed on seeds and roots, or prey on other insects. The natural habitat of Agriotes species is grassland, but it is forested areas for the other genera. The members of this tribe can be recognized by their simple claws, by the simple ventral side of the third tarsal segment, and by the sutures between the sternum and pleura of the prothorax being grooved at the anterior ends.

== Distribution ==
The species of click beetles in the tribe Agriotini are widely distributed in the Americas, Europe, eastern Asia, and north-western Africa. However, there are few records from remaining parts of Africa, from south-western Asia and the western Pacific islands apart from Japan and Taiwan. Further, there are apparently no confirmed records from central and eastern Pacific islands and from Australia. Several genera of Agriotini have a very restricted geographical distribution. These include the genera Bohartina (Chile), Chatanayus (Japan), Hypodesis (Costa Rica and Panama), Insuliectinus (Japan), Pomachilioides (Sumatra), Raphaellus (Colombia), and Sadoganus (Japan).

== Biology and description ==
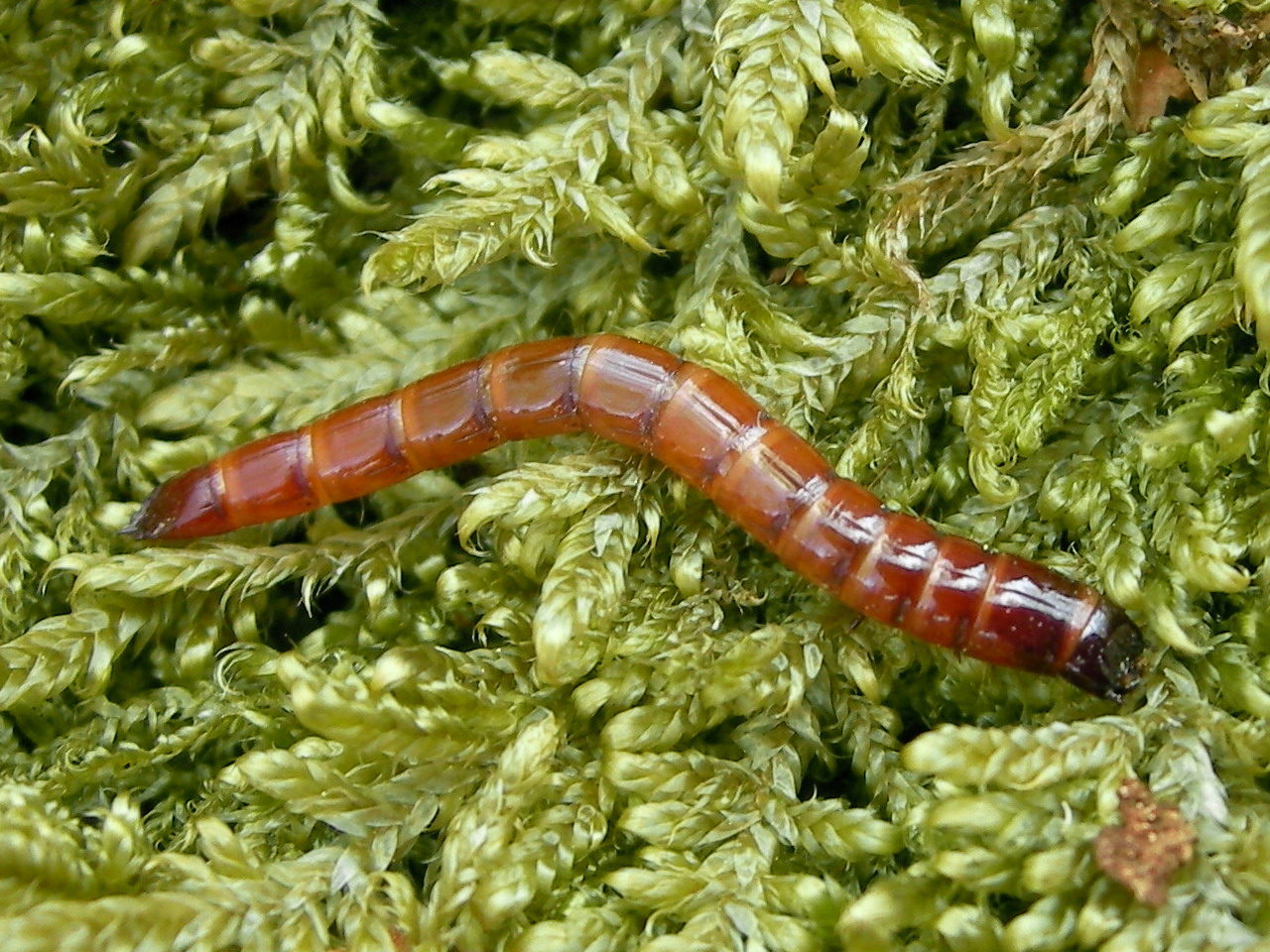
Larva (wireworm) of Agriotes lineatus placed on a patch of moss

Like other click beetles, the members of the tribe Agriotini breed in the soil and the larvae (wireworms) are elongated with a hardened cuticle. They feed on seeds, roots (e.g. Agriotes) and dead wood or prey on other insects (e.g. Dalopius). Several species of Agriotes are common and can invade agricultural fields feeding on the seeds and roots of crops like cereals, root crops or forage crops. The adult beetles feed on flowers, foliage and plant sap, but unlike the wireworms, they do not cause crop damage. Forested areas are the natural habitat for most genera in the tribe Agriotini. However, for many Agriotes species, grassland has been reported as the natural habitat.

Species in the tribe Agriotini can be recognized by a combination of morphological features, including:

- the claws on the tarsi are simple,
- the end of the 3rd tarsal segment has a simple structure,
- the sutures between the sternum and pleura of the prothorax are grooved at the anterior ends,
- the carina on the frons are raised.

== Common genera ==
The tribe Agriotini has 13 genera which are listed in the taxonomy section below. Five of the more common genera are briefly covered here:

=== Genus Agriotes Eschscholtz 1829 ===
Agriotes sputator

This is the largest genus in the tribe Agriotini with more than 350 species and the type species Agriotes sputator. The genus is widely distributed in Europe, temperate and subtropical parts of Asia, parts of northern Africa and in the Americas. Several species are common and the larval stages (wireworms) of some are regarded as agricultural pests. These include, for example, three invasive species that have spread from Europe to North America. The natural habitat of Agriotes is grassland, from where the beetles can invade crops. Breeding takes place in the soil, where the larvae or wireworms feed on seeds and roots. Crops most often damaged by pest species include maize, forage crops like alfalfa, or root crops like potatoes and sugar beet. Species of Agriotes can be mainly recognized by structures on the pronotum and the head. For example, the S-shaped course of the lateral ridges on the pronotum, or the ridges above the antennae.

=== Genus Cardiorhinus Eschscholtz 1829 ===
Cardiorhinus seminiger

This is a large genus with more than 70 species described. These are found in South and Central America, ranging in the South from southern Brazil, northern Argentina, as well as northern and central parts of Chile to countries in the North like French Guiana, Venezuela, Peru, Colombia, Panama, Nicaragua and parts of Mexico. The genus Cardiorhinus can be recognized by a number of morphological features. In part 46 of the book "Genera insectorum" Otto Schwarz summarized the features of the genus as: frons domed; antennal pits shallow; labrum large, grooved and emarginated in front; prosternal sutures fine, slightly curved inside. The adult beetles are commonly found near forests on flowers and shrubs.

=== Genus Dalopius Eschscholtz 1829 ===
Dalopius marginatus

This is a large genus with nearly 80 species. Many species are found in North America (> 50) and eastern Asia (> 20), but few in Western Asia and only the type species in Europe. The type species, Dalopius marginatus, occurs in most parts of Europe with its distribution extending into parts of Asia, including Turkey, Kazakhstan, Mongolia, Siberia and parts of China. Dalopius species are small to medium-sized and elongated click beetles (6–10 mm). The genus can be recognized by the shapes of the pronotum, the antennae and the hind coxae, as well as the male genitalia. Dalopius species live in forest environments, where the adults feed on flowers and plant sap, while the larvae (wireworms) feed on dead wood or roots and also prey on other insects.

=== Genus Ectinus Eschscholtz 1829 ===
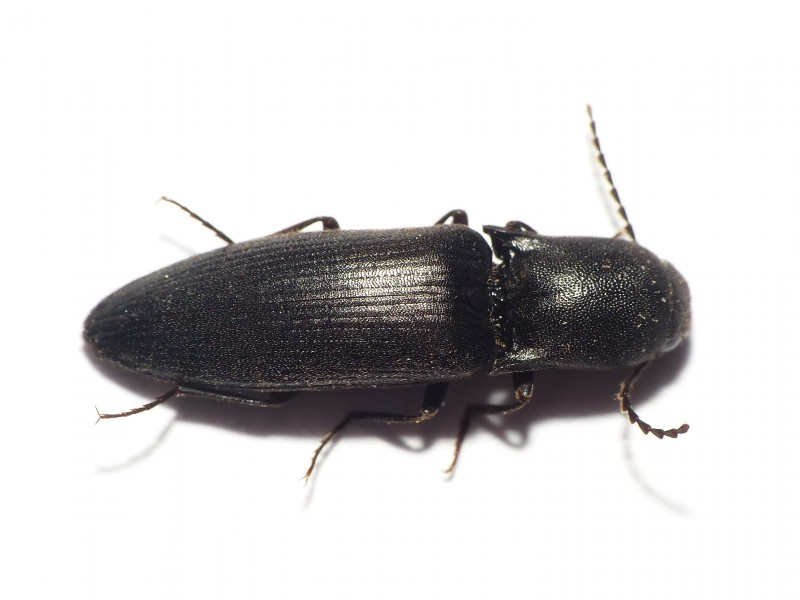
Ectinus aterrimus from the Netherlands

As of 2026, more than 40 species have been described or assigned to this genus, see Wikispecies. Almost all have been reported to occur in north-eastern Asia (China, Taiwan, Korea, Japan and far-eastern Russia). However, the type species, Ectinus aterrimus is widely distributed in Central Europe and has been also reported from West Siberia. In morphology, this genus is similar to Agriotes, but both genera can be distinguished, among others, by the shape of the clypeus and the S-shaped ridges above the antennae. Ectinus aterrimus can be common and the larvae (wireworms) might cause some damage to the roots of seedlings in forest nurseries, see the German Wikipedia.

=== Genus Ludioschema Reitter 1891 ===
Ludioschema vittiger

This genus is widely distributed in Asia. As of 2026, more than 20 species have been described from India, Nepal, China, Taiwan and South Korea. The type species, Ludioschema emerichi, appears to be rare with the type locality only stated as 'Caucasus' without collection details. Ludioschema is a forgotten genus and after the description of the type species in 1891, no more species were described under this genus until 1999. Most of the currently recognized species had been described under the genera Chiagosnius or Agonischius. The genus Chiagosnius is regarded as a junior synonym of Ludioschema since 1998. As described by Reitter and subsequent authors, the main features of the genus Ludioschema include the long hairs on the underside (pubescence), the serrated antennae and the shape of the pronotum.

== Taxonomy ==
There have been different interpretations of the authorship of the tribe Agriotini. Some authors cite Champion 1896 as the author since he was the first to use the name Agriotini. Campion did not provide a description and only listed the genus Agriotes under this tribe. Other authors credit Laporte de Castelnau with the authorship of the tribe, since he was the first to describe and name a group of click beetles similar to the genus Agriotes. He named the group "Agriotites" and assigned 19 genera to it. However, apart from Agriotes, none of the other 18 genera are currently regarded as belonging to the tribe Agriotini.

The name "Agriotites" together with the description by Laporte de Castelnau has been interpretated as a not Latinized vernacular name which is available according to chapter 4, article 11.7.2 of the code of the International Commission on Zoological Nomenclature because it was later Latinized by Champion. Article 11.7.2 states that such a name is available "with its original author and date" if it has been published before 1900 and has been "latinized by later authors and has been generally accepted as valid by authors interested in the group concerned and as dating from that first publication in vernacular form".

The tribe Agriotini currently includes 13 genera (status 2026). Nearly half of them are monotypic and currently contain only one species. Agriotes is by far the largest genus with more than 350 species.

The tribe Agriotini has 2 subtribes, the Agriotina Laporte 1840 and the Cardiorhinina Candèze 1863. However, the subtribe Cardiorhinina includes only the genus Cardiorhinus. As per Wikispecies and other sources, the subtribe Agriotina includes the following 12 genera:

- Agriotes Eschscholtz 1829
- Bohartina Arias 2006
- Chatanayus Fleutiaux 1940
- Dalopius Eschscholtz 1829
- Ectinoides Kishii 1966
- Ectinus Eschscholtz 1829
- Hypodesis Latreille 1834
- Insuliectinus Kishii 1984
- Ludioschema Reitter 1891
- Pomachilioides Candèze 1897
- Raphaellus Zurita-García, Morales-Perdomo & Martínez-Luque 2023
- Sadoganus Ôhira 1956

There are several taxonomic issues regarding the above list of genera which should be mentioned:

- The genus Pseudagriotes is often placed in the tribe Agriotini, but should be placed in the tribe Elaterini.
- Older lists of Agriotini genera include the genus Chiagosnius Fleutiaux 1940. This genus is now regarded to be a synonym of Ludioschema Reitter 1891.
- The genus Ectinus Eschscholtz 1829 is widely regarded as a valid genus in the tribe Agriotini. On one website it has been stated to be a synonym of Pittonotus Kiesenwetter 1859, apparently an error, since Pittonotus belongs to a different tribe and was described after Ectinus.
- Sometimes, Pomachilioides Candèze 1897 is stated to be a synonym of Paracosmesus Schwarz 1901. It is possible that this synonymy originated due to a misunderstanding of the entry "Pomachilioides (= Paracosmesus) Schwarz VI 508" published in a list of zoological names in 1903 in the journal Zoologischer Anzeiger. This entry refers to Pomachilioides Schwarz 1901, not Pomachilioides Candèze 1897. In 1901, Schwarz described 4 species of click beetles from Peru under the 'new' genus Pomachilioides, but shortly afterwards realized that the name was already preoccupied by Candèze and renamed the genus Paracosmesus.
