= Dolopius =

Dolopius may refer to:

- Dolopius Eschscholtz, 1829, a genus of beetles in the family Elateridae; synonym of Cardiophorus
- Dolopius Dejean, 1833, a genus of beetles in the family Elateridae; synonym of Dalopius
