= Bohartina =

- Bohartina vilchesensis

Scientific classification
- Kingdom: Animalia
- Phylum: Arthropoda
- Clade: Pancrustacea
- Class: Insecta
- Order: Coleoptera
- Suborder: Polyphaga
- Infraorder: Elateriformia
- Family: Elateridae
- Subfamily: Elaterinae
- Tribe: Agriotini
- Genus: Bohartina; Arias 2006

Type species
- Bohartina vilchesensis Arias 2006

Genus of beetles

Bohartina is a small and rare genus of beetles in the family of click beetles or Elateridae, only known from the original description of the genus in 2006. Two species have been described, both with a very restricted distribution in central Chile around the city of Talca. The distinctive morphological features of the genus include structures on the head and the prothorax, as well as the size of the female colleterial glands. So far, only adults beetle of Bohartina have been collected. They live in forest environments and the specimens examined are all flightless, lacking hindwings.

Type species: Bohartina vilchesensis

== Distribution ==
The species of the genus Bohartina have been collected only in two locations of the pre-Andean foothills of Central Chile, specifically around the city of Talca. The type locality of Bohartina vilchesensis is Vilches Alto, a mountain village ~ 60 km south-east of the city of Talca. The second species, Bohartina palmae was collected at the same location, but also further south in Fundo Malcho Parral.

== Biology ==
There is almost nothing known about the biology of Bohartina species. Only that they live in elevated forest environments in the pre-Andean foothills of Central Chile. All adult specimens observed so far are flightless and apparently live mainly on the ground and move by walking. The larval stages (wireworms) have not been recorded or described.

== Description and taxonomy ==
Scanning electron micrograph of head of Bohartina vilchesensis, frontal view

The adult beetles of Bohartina are small compared to other genera of the tribe Agriotini with a length of around 5 mm and a brownish color. On the head, the ridges above the antennal base (frontal carinae) are incomplete and do not reach the anterior margin of the frons. The antennae have 11 segments and the length does not exceed the end of the outer pointed tips at the end of the prothorax. The width of the prothorax narrows strongly in its frontal part. The structures of the female and male reproductive organs are also characteristic.

The species of Bohartina have similar morphological features compared to those of the genus Agriotes. However, they differ in the narrower frontal part of the prothorax (significantly wider in Agriotes species where the prothorax has parallel sides), the smaller colleterial glands in females and the course of the frontal carinae. Males and females cannot be distinguished without dissecting them and all specimens examined lack hindwings. Species of Bohartina belong to the tribe Agriotini because the claws are simple, the ventral side of the 3rd tarsal segment is simple, and the sutures between the sternum and pleura of the prothorax are grooved at the anterior ends. The genus Bohartina has been named for the American entomologist Richard M. Bohart.
