= Cardiorhinus elegans =

Scientific classification
- Kingdom: Animalia
- Phylum: Arthropoda
- Class: Insecta
- Order: Coleoptera
- Suborder: Polyphaga
- Infraorder: Elateriformia
- Family: Elateridae
- Genus: Cardiorhinus
- Species: C. elegans

Binomial name
- Cardiorhinus elegans Golbach, 1983

Species of beetle

Cardiorhinus elegans is a species of click beetles in the subfamily Dendrometrinae. It is found in Brazil.
