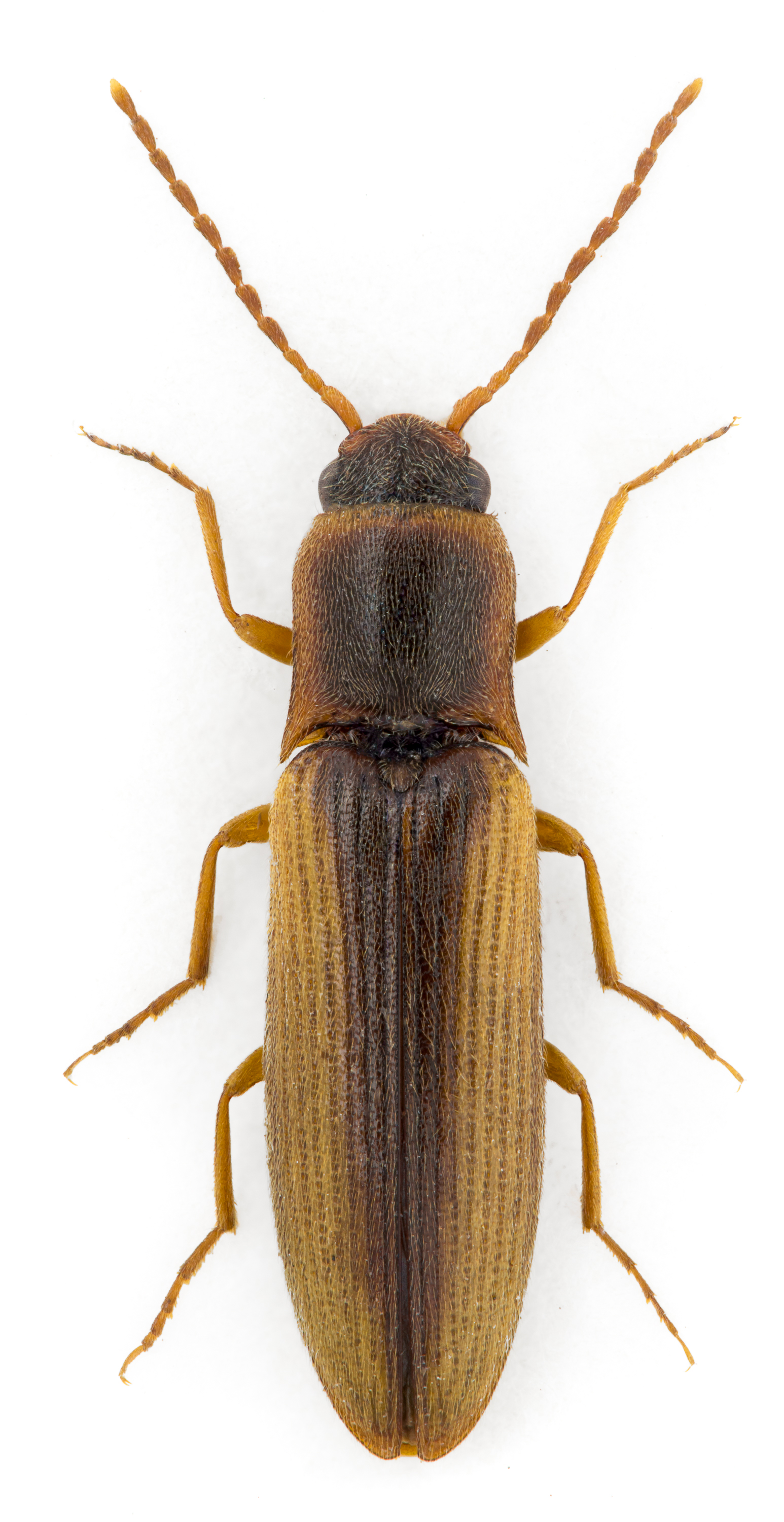

Scientific classification
- Kingdom: Animalia
- Phylum: Arthropoda
- Class: Insecta
- Order: Coleoptera
- Suborder: Polyphaga
- Infraorder: Elateriformia
- Family: Elateridae
- Genus: Dalopius
- Species: D. marginatus

Binomial name
- Dalopius marginatus (Linnaeus, 1758)

= Dalopius marginatus =

Species of beetle

Dalopius marginatus is a species of click beetles native to Europe.
