= Zoologischer Anzeiger =

Scientific journal

- Language: English
- Edited by: Carsten Lüter

Publication details
- History: since 1878
- Publisher: Elsevier
- Frequency: quarterly
- Impact factor: 1.581 (2021)

Standard abbreviations
- ISO 4: Zool. Anz.

Indexing
- ISSN: 0044-5231
- OCLC no.: 300273791

Links
- Journal homepage

Zoologischer Anzeiger – A Journal of Comparative Zoology is a peer-reviewed scientific journal specialising in the field of comparative zoology. It is included in a number of bibliographic databases:

- Animal Breeding Abstracts
- Bio-Control News and Information
- Biological Abstracts
- BIOSIS
- CAB Abstracts
- Cambridge Scientific Abstracts
- Chemical Abstracts
- Current Advances in Ecological and Environmental Sciences
- Current Contents, Agriculture, Biology & Environmental Sciences
- Ecological Abstracts
- Elsevier BIOBASE / Current Awareness in Biological Sciences
- Elsevier GEO Abstracts
- Fisheries Review
- Geo Abstracts
- GEOBASE
- Helminthological Abstracts
- Index Veterinarius
- NISC - National Information Services Corporation
- Oceanographic Literature Review
- Referativnyi Zhurnal
- Research Alert
- Science Citation Index
- SciExpanded
- SciSearch
- Scopus
- Veterinary Bulletin
- Wildlife Review
- Zoological Record
