= Cardiorhinus =

Scientific classification
- Kingdom: Animalia
- Phylum: Arthropoda
- Class: Insecta
- Order: Coleoptera
- Suborder: Polyphaga
- Infraorder: Elateriformia
- Family: Elateridae
- Subfamily: Elaterinae
- Genus: Cardiorhinus; Eschscholtz, 1829

Species
- See text

Synonyms
- Antiphus Gistl, 1834; Cardiorrhinus Scudder, 1882

Genus of beetles

Cardiorhinus is a genus of click beetles in the subfamily Elaterinae.

== Species ==
- Cardiorhinus acuminatus Germar, 1824
- Cardiorhinus aeneolipennis Candèze, 1863
- Cardiorhinus andicola Candèze, 1897
- Cardiorhinus antennalis Germar, 1843
- Cardiorhinus apicalis Golbach, 1979
- Cardiorhinus aristatus Golbach, 1979
- Cardiorhinus baeri Fleutiaux, 1940
- Cardiorhinus basalis Candèze, 1863
- Cardiorhinus beckeri Golbach, 1979
- Cardiorhinus bellus Candèze, 1893
- Cardiorhinus bicolor Candèze, 1863
- Cardiorhinus bilineatus Fabricius, 1801
- Cardiorhinus bimaculatus Schwarz, 1902
- Cardiorhinus binotatus Champion, 1896
- Cardiorhinus bonariensis Candèze, 1863
- Cardiorhinus castaneipennis Germar, 1863
- Cardiorhinus chilensis Golbach, 1983
- Cardiorhinus circumcinctus Germar, 1824
- Cardiorhinus collaris Schwarz, 1904
- Cardiorhinus coralinus Golbach, 1983
- Cardiorhinus costae Golbach, 1983
- Cardiorhinus cruentus Candèze, 1863
- Cardiorhinus cuneatus Candèze, 1863
- Cardiorhinus cylindricus Schwarz, 1904
- Cardiorhinus difficilis Golbach, 1988
- Cardiorhinus dimidiatus Schwarz, 1904
- Cardiorhinus discicollis Schwarz, 1906
- Cardiorhinus divaricatus Schwarz, 1904
- Cardiorhinus elegans Golbach, 1983
- Cardiorhinus emarginatus Garg & Vasu, 1998
- Cardiorhinus frenatus Germar, 1824
- Cardiorhinus granulosus Solier, 1851
- Cardiorhinus hayekae Golbach, 1983
- Cardiorhinus humeralis Eschscholtz, 1829
- Cardiorhinus hypocrita Erichson, 1848
- Cardiorhinus inaequalis Candèze, 1863
- Cardiorhinus infernus Schwarz, 1904
- Cardiorhinus intermedius Schwarz, 1904
- Cardiorhinus laetipennis Candèze, 1881
- Cardiorhinus lineatus Golbach, 1979
- Cardiorhinus luisae Golbach, 1983
- Cardiorhinus maculatus Golbach, 1983
- Cardiorhinus maculicollis Candèze, 1863
- Cardiorhinus modestus Candèze, 1863
- Cardiorhinus opacus Candèze, 1863
- Cardiorhinus pallidipennis Candèze, 1863
- Cardiorhinus parabicolor Golbach, 1983
- Cardiorhinus parapullatus Golbach, 1983
- Cardiorhinus piciventris Germar, 1843
- Cardiorhinus pilosus Golbach, 1988
- Cardiorhinus plagiatus Germar, 1824
- Cardiorhinus plagiatus (Germar, 1824)
- Cardiorhinus plebejus Candèze, 1863
- Cardiorhinus politus Fleutiaux, 1940
- Cardiorhinus porteri Golbach, 1983
- Cardiorhinus pullatus Candèze, 1863
- Cardiorhinus quadrivittatus Golbach, 1979
- Cardiorhinus ruficollis Schwarz, 1904
- Cardiorhinus rufilateris (Eschscholtz, 1822)
- Cardiorhinus sanguinolentus Candèze, 1863
- Cardiorhinus schwarzi Golbach, 1983
- Cardiorhinus seminiger Eschscholtz, 1829
- Cardiorhinus semiotoides Fleutiaux, 1940
- Cardiorhinus semirufus Candèze, 1863
- Cardiorhinus simplex Candèze, 1863
- Cardiorhinus sulcatus Candèze, 1863
- Cardiorhinus tactus Candèze, 1881
- Cardiorhinus taeniatus Candèze, 1863
- Cardiorhinus thoracicus Golbach, 1988
- Cardiorhinus trivittatus Candèze, 1863
- Cardiorhinus truncatus Vats & Chauhan, 1993
- Cardiorhinus unicolor Golbach, 1983
- Cardiorhinus vinulus Candèze, 1863
- Cardiorhinus vulneratus Germar, 1824
- Cardiorhinus willineri Golbach, 1979
- Cardiorhinus ypirangus Golbach, 1983
