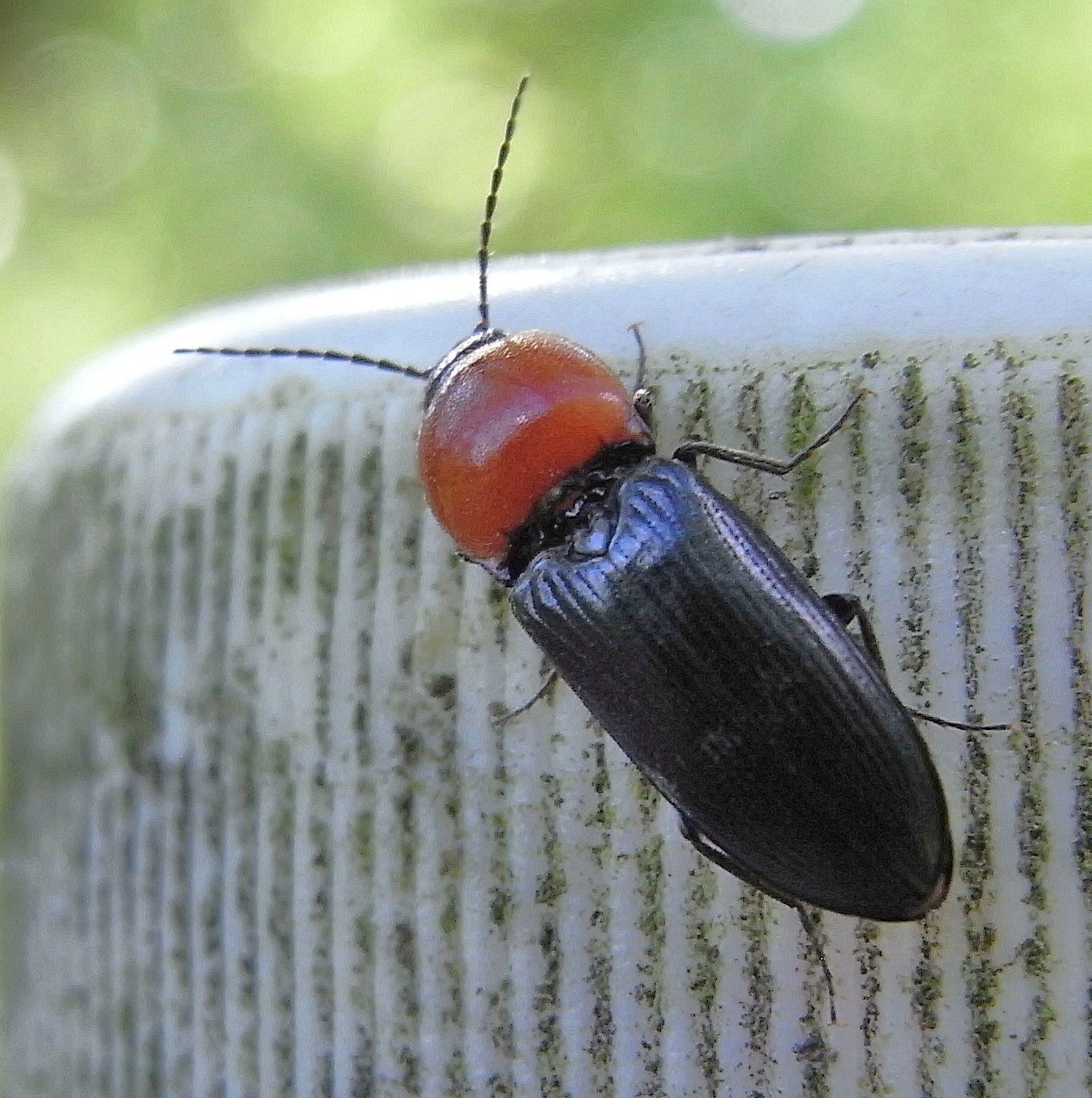
- Cardiophorus gramineus near Nagykallo, Hungary, in 2010

Scientific classification
- Domain: Eukaryota
- Kingdom: Animalia
- Phylum: Arthropoda
- Class: Insecta
- Order: Coleoptera
- Suborder: Polyphaga
- Infraorder: Elateriformia
- Family: Elateridae
- Subfamily: Cardiophorinae
- Tribe: Cardiophorini
- Genus: Cardiophorus; Eschscholtz, 1829

Synonyms
- Calliderus Agassiz, 1846; Caloderus Stephens, 1830; Cardiaphorus Motschulsky, 1858; Cardiosphorus Gurjeva, 1974; Cardophorus Curtis, 1840; Coptostethus Wollaston, 1854; Coptosthetus Candèze, 1860; Dolopius Falderman, 1835; Lasiocerus du Buysson, 1912; Melanotus Gistel, 1834; Metacardiophorus Gur'eva, 1966; Nyctor Semenov & Pjatakova, 1936; Perinellus Schwarz, 1906; Perrinellus du Buysson, 1899; Zigocardiophorus Mardjanian, 1981; Zygocardiophorus Mardjanian, 1981

= Cardiophorus =

Genus of beetles

Cardiophorus is a genus of click beetles in the family Elateridae. There are at least 180 described species in Cardiophorus, found worldwide.

== Gallery ==
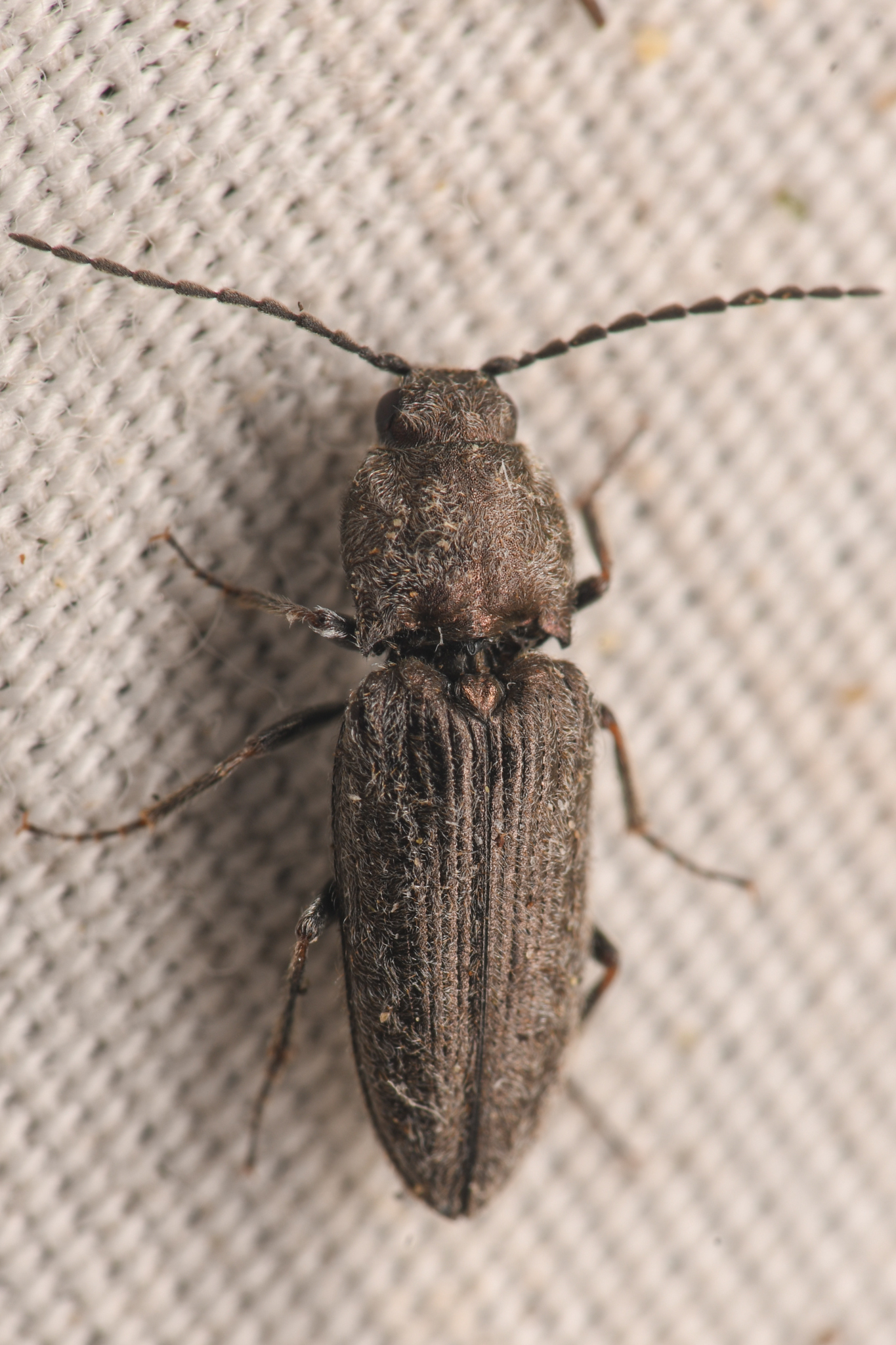
Cardiophorus aeneus, California

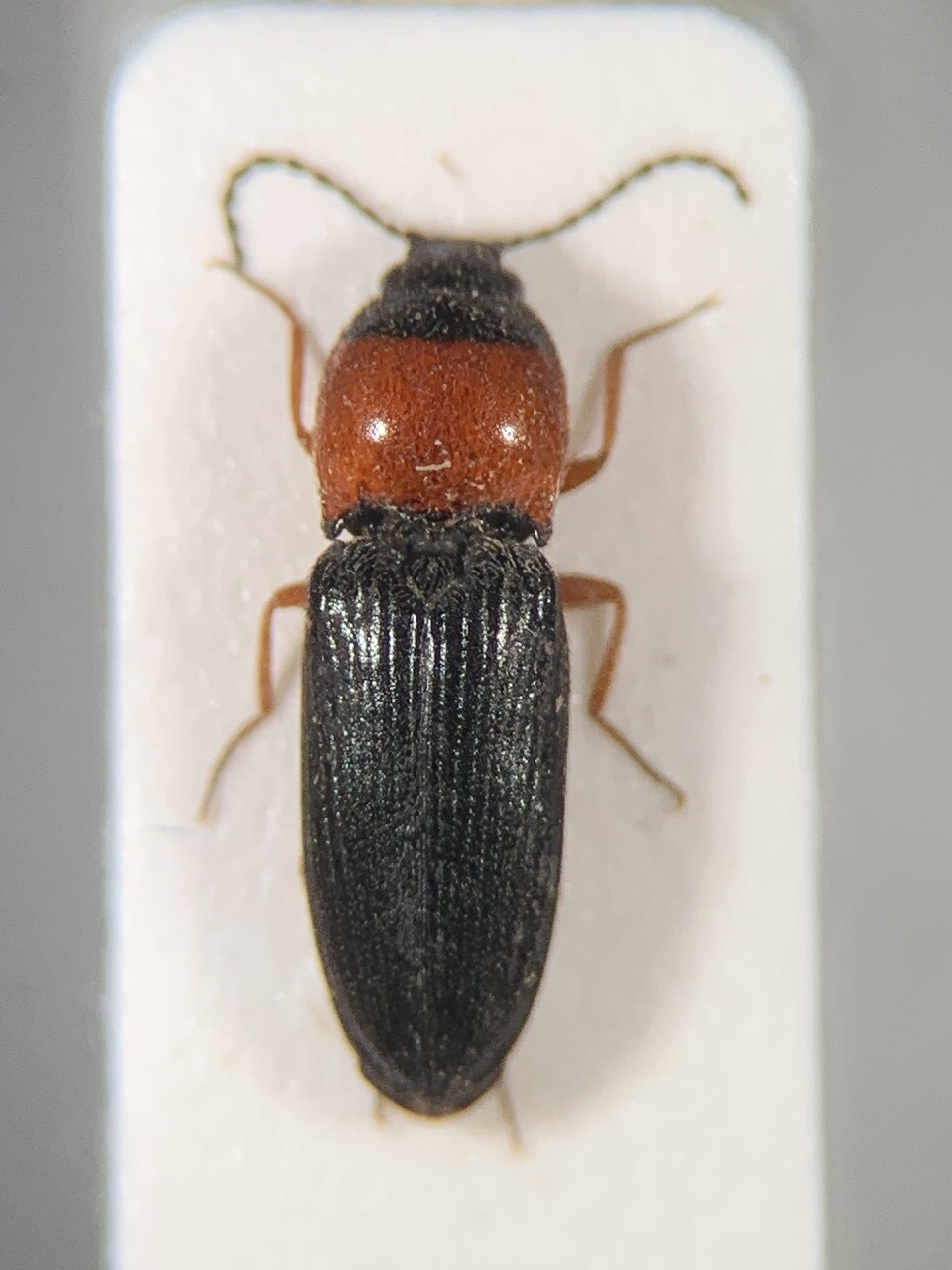
Cardiophorus anticus, Italy

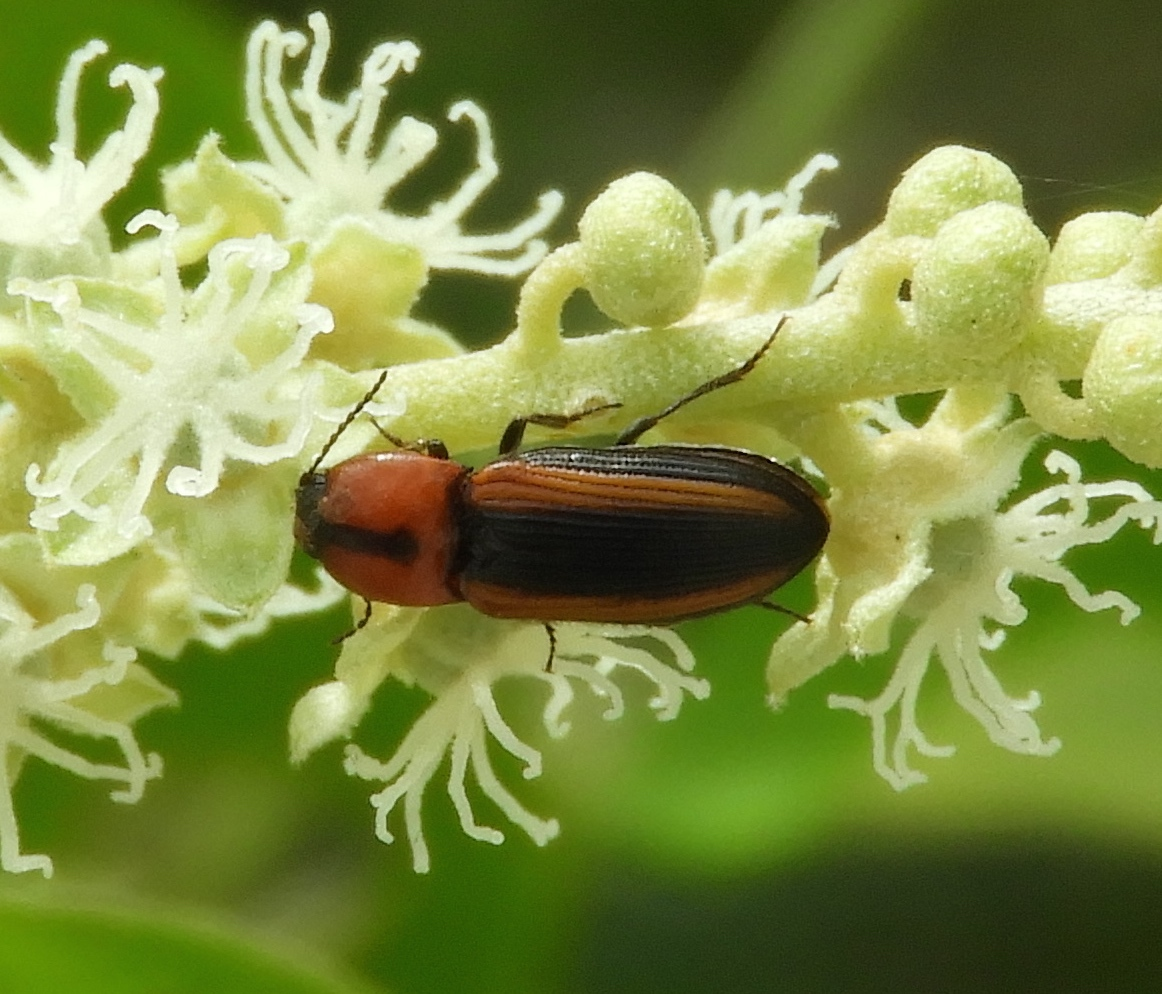
Cardiophorus aptopoides, México

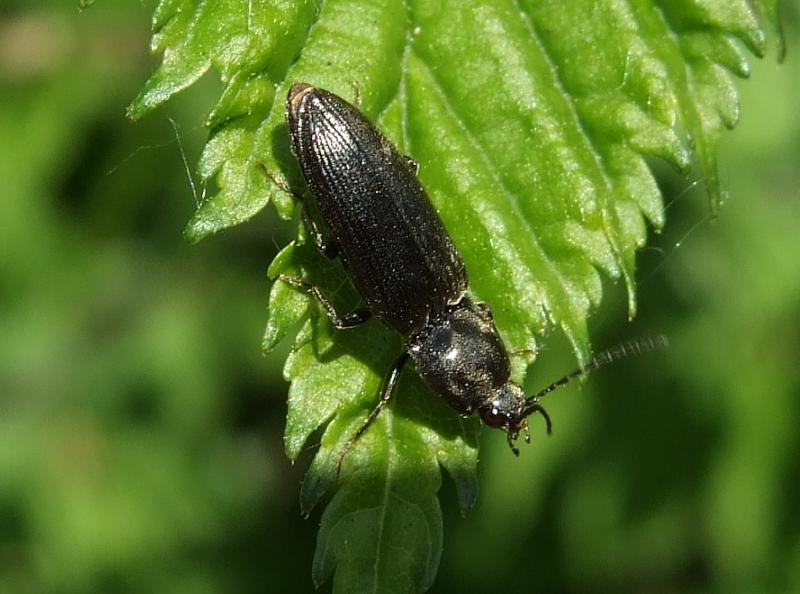
Cardiophorus asellus, The Netherlands

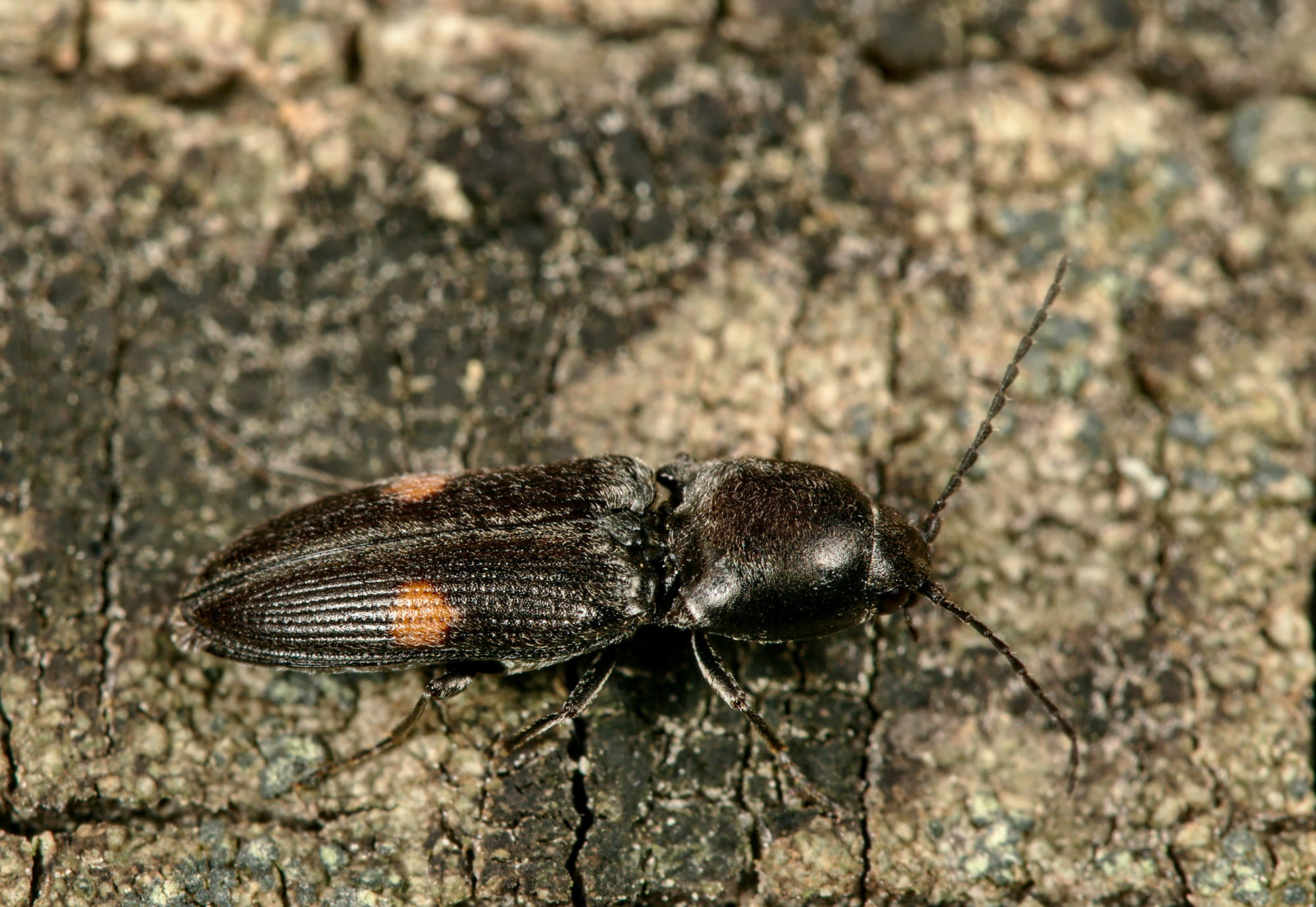
Cardiophorus biguttatus, France

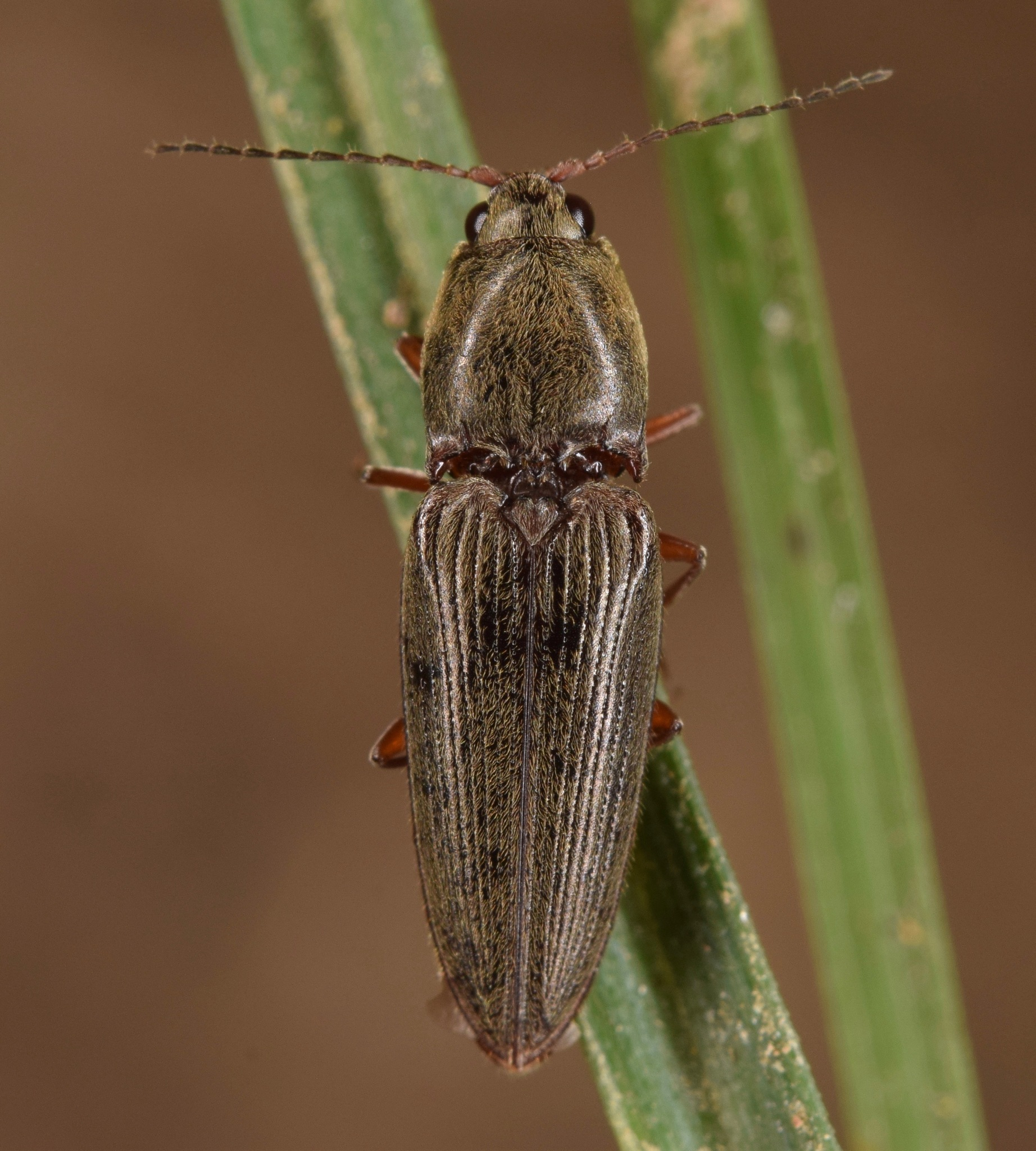
Cardiophorus convexus, Georgia, USA

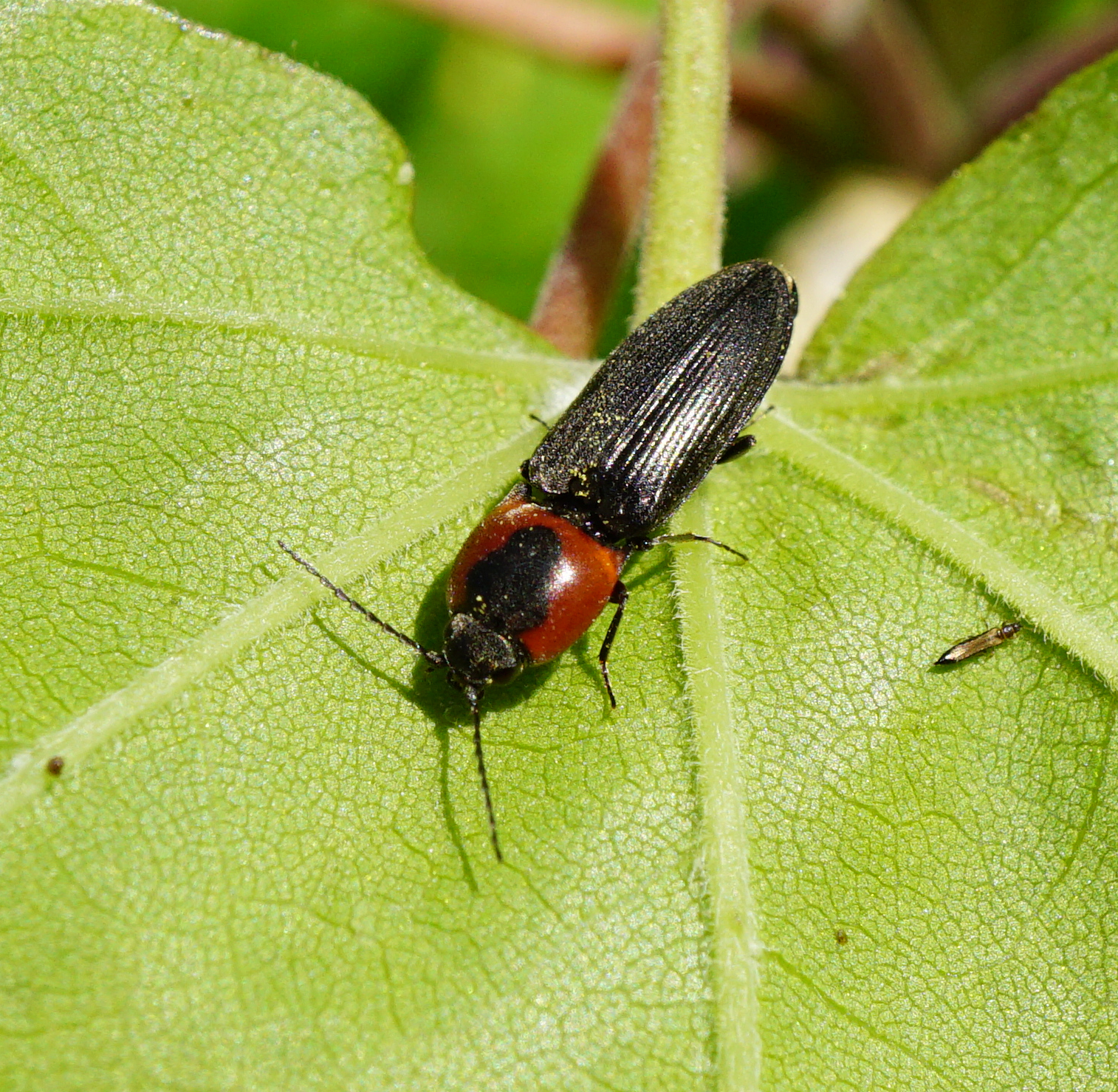
Cardiophorus discicollis, Austria

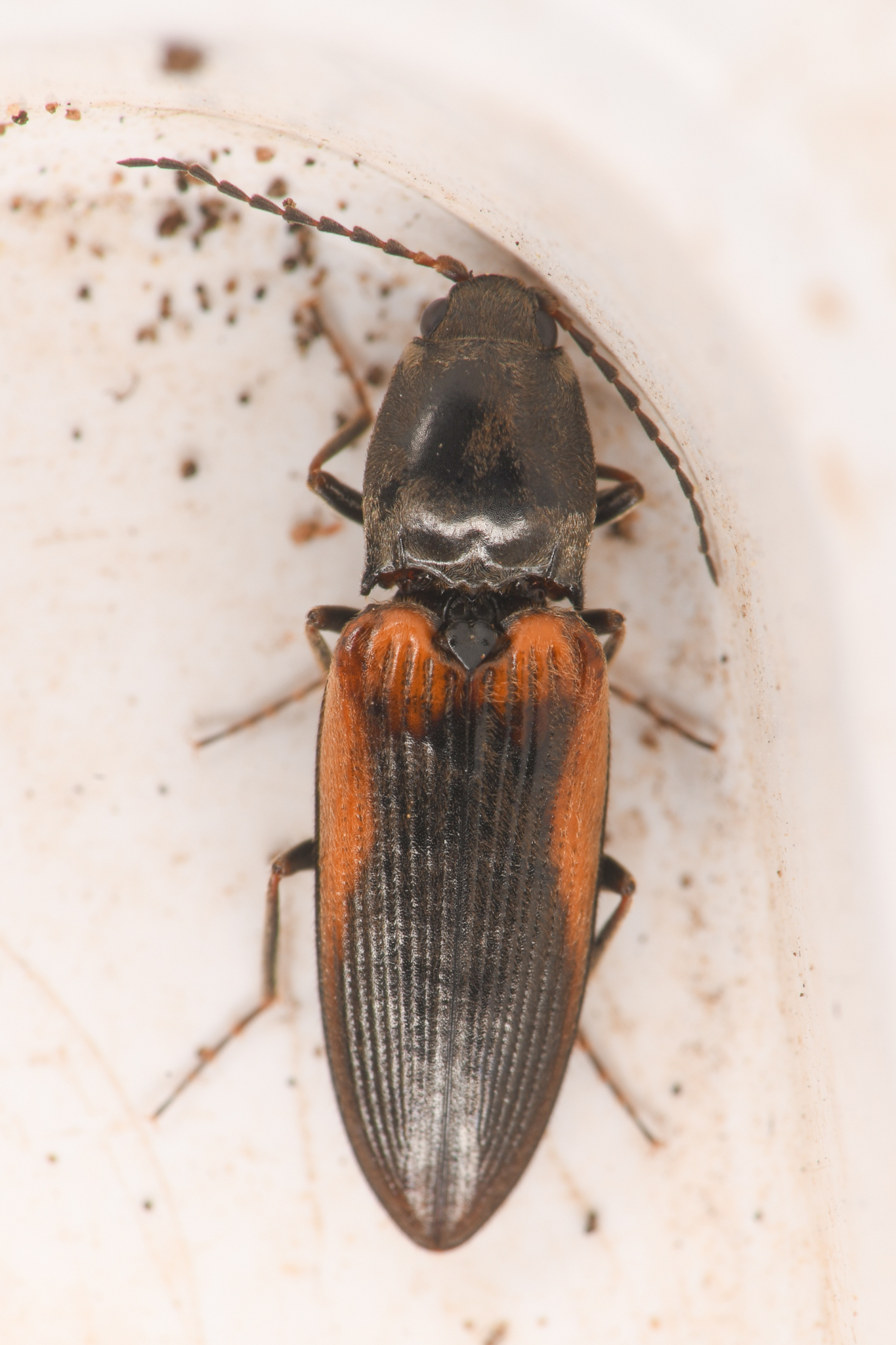
Cardiophorus edwardsi, California

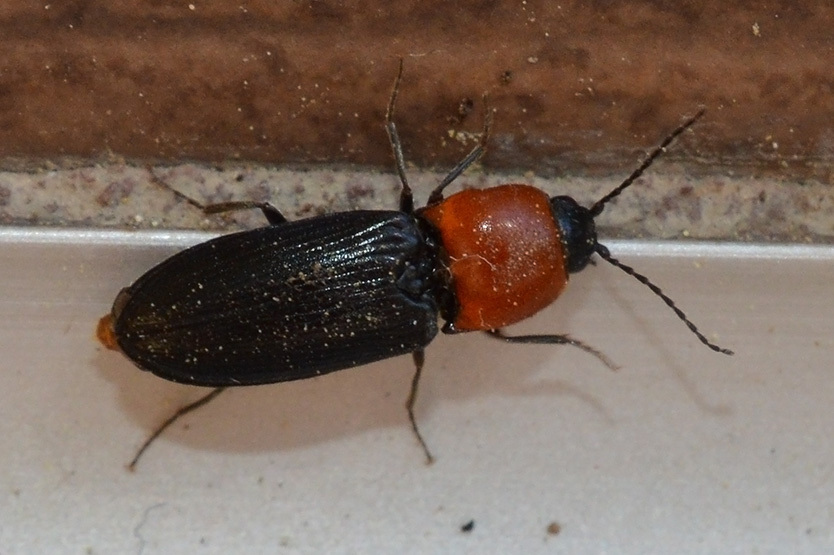
Cardiophorus gramineus, Bulgaria

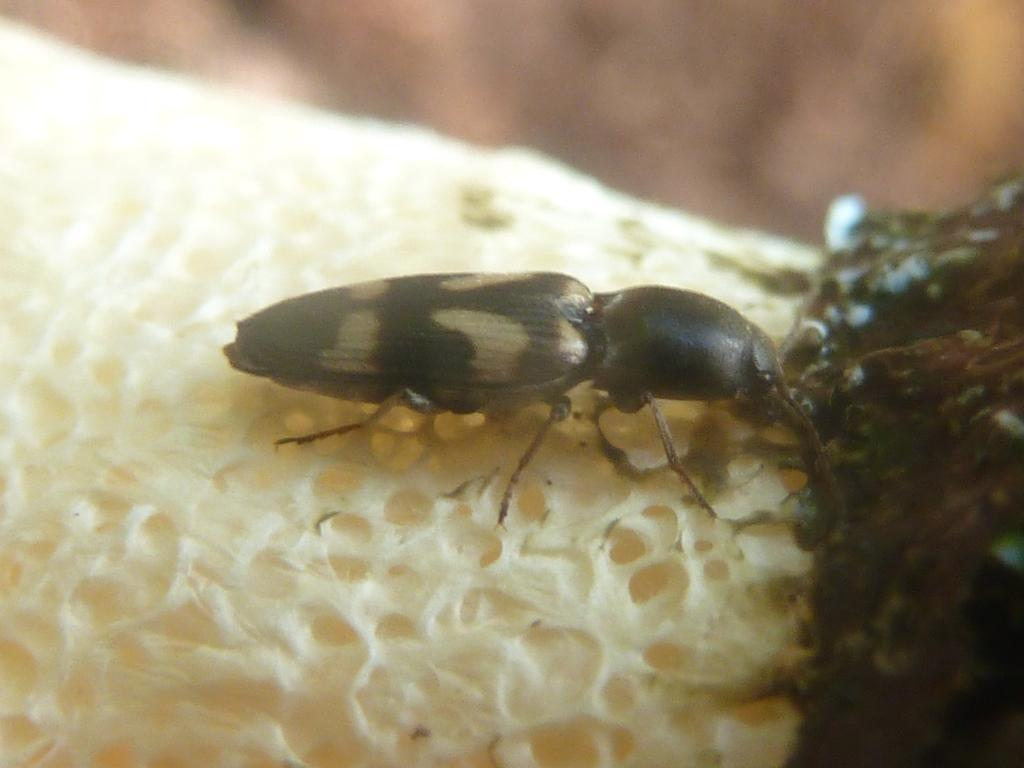
Cardiophorus histrio, South Africa

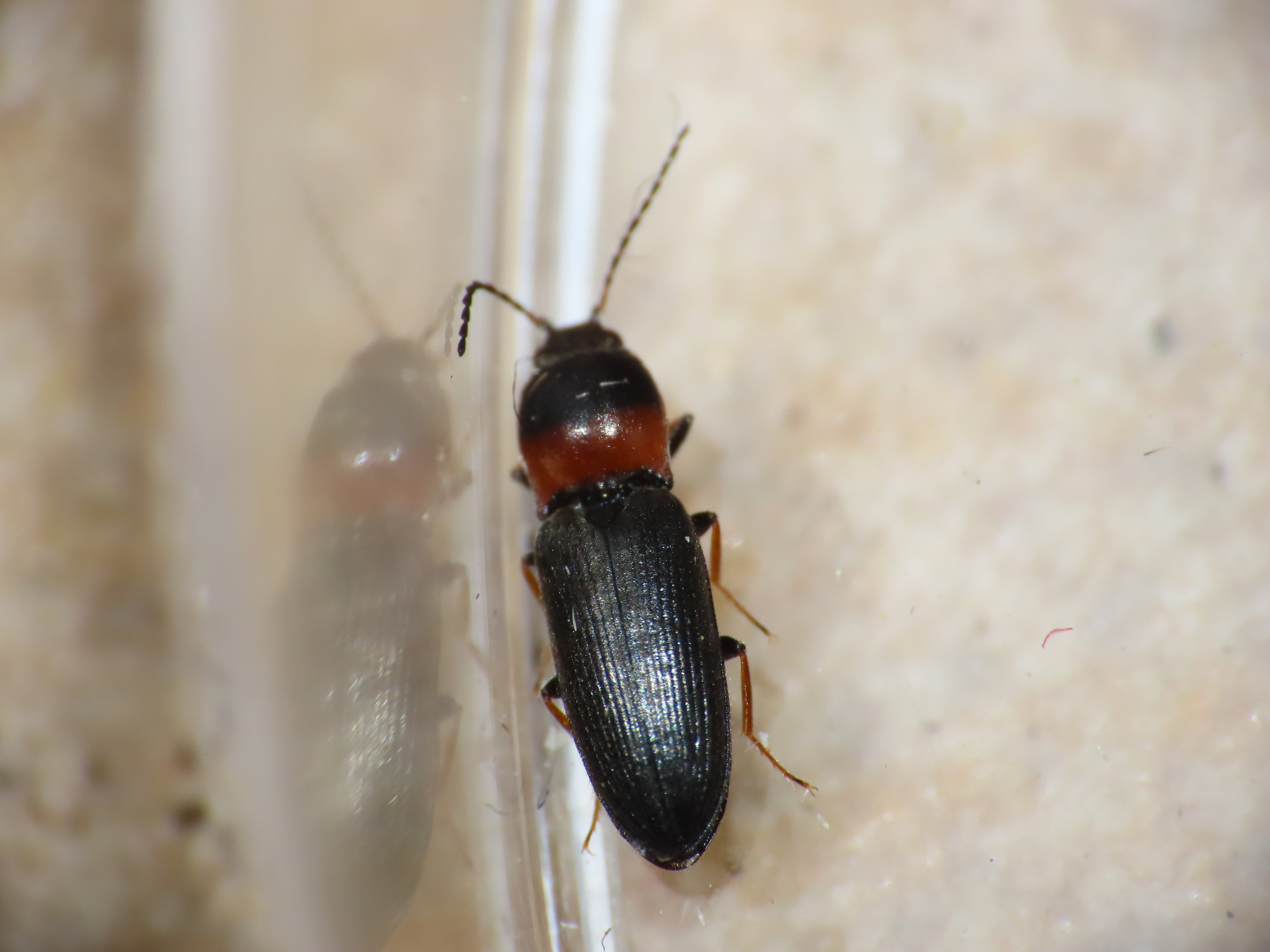
Cardiophorus italicus, Italy

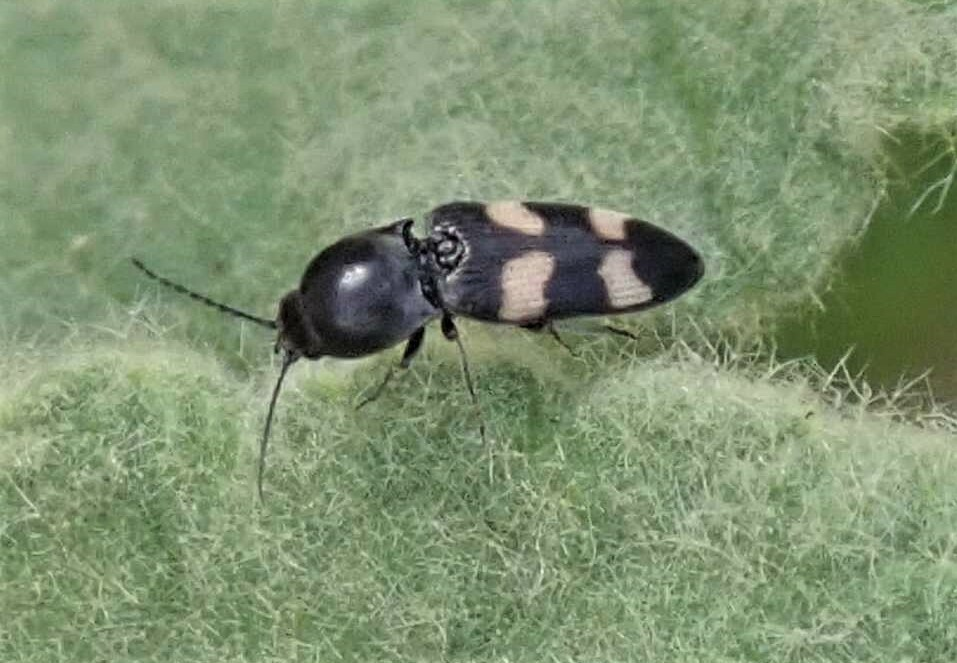
Cardiophorus obliquemaculatus, South Africa

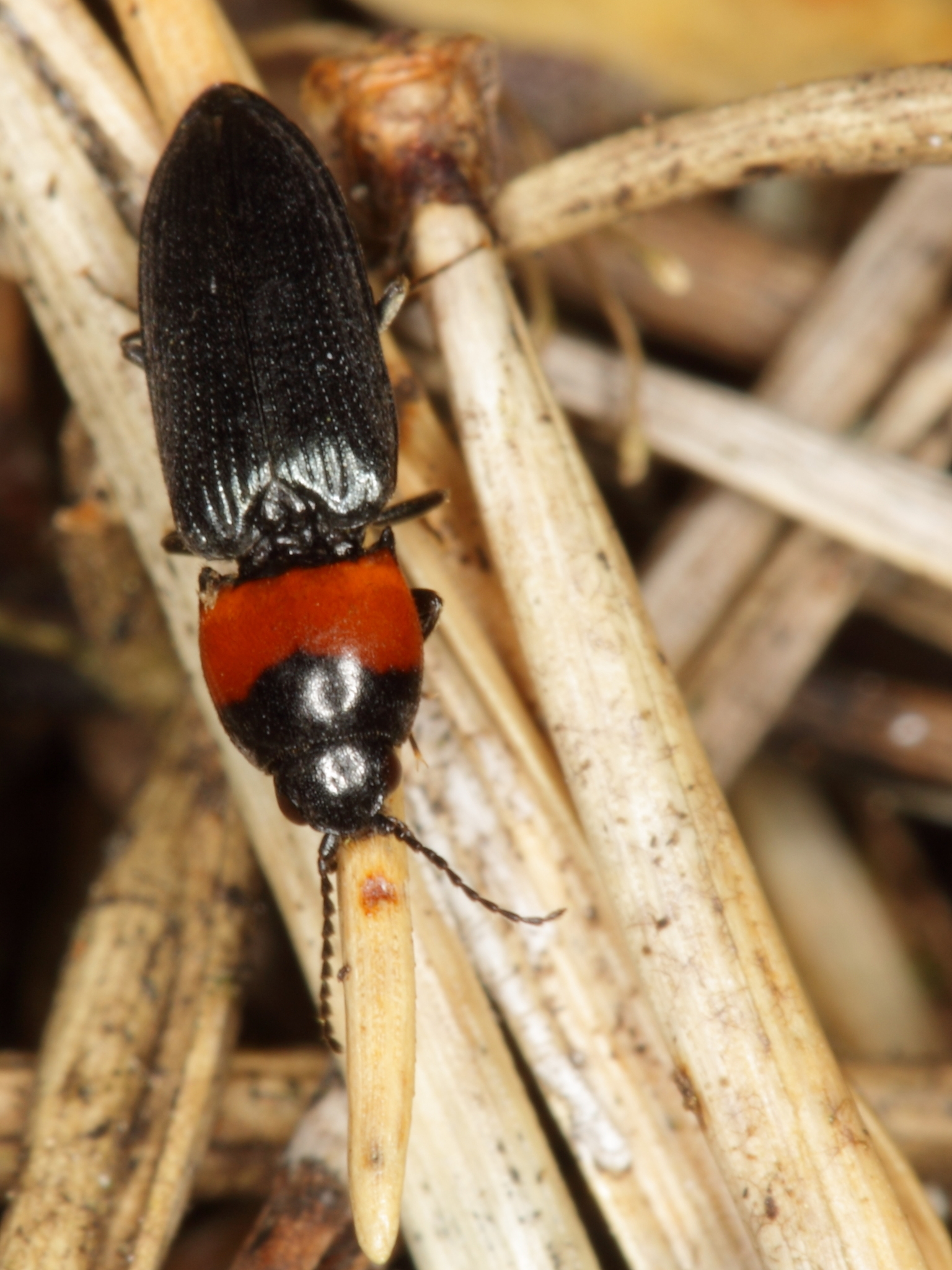
Cardiophorus ruficollis, Germany

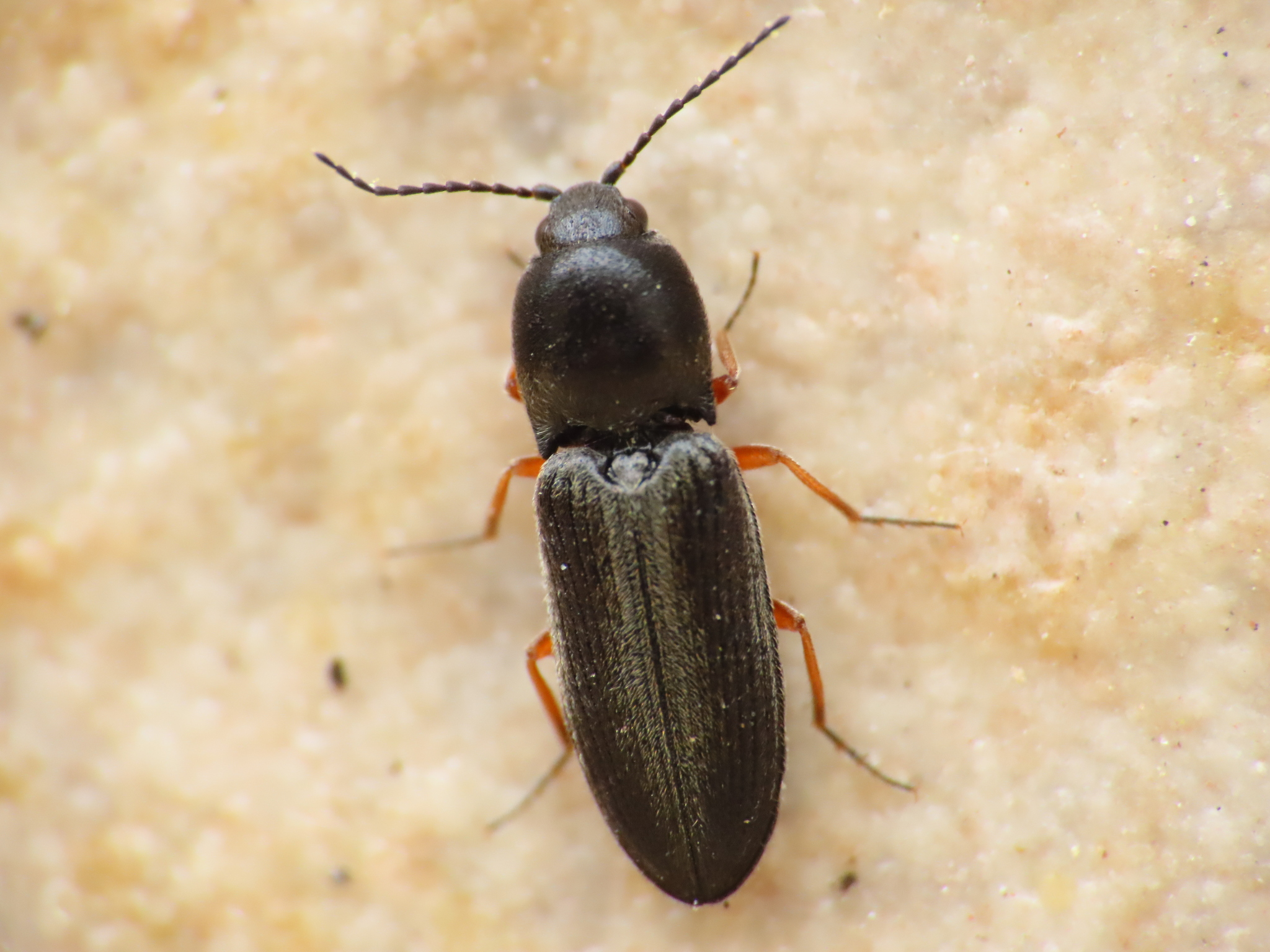
Cardiophorus rufipes, Italy

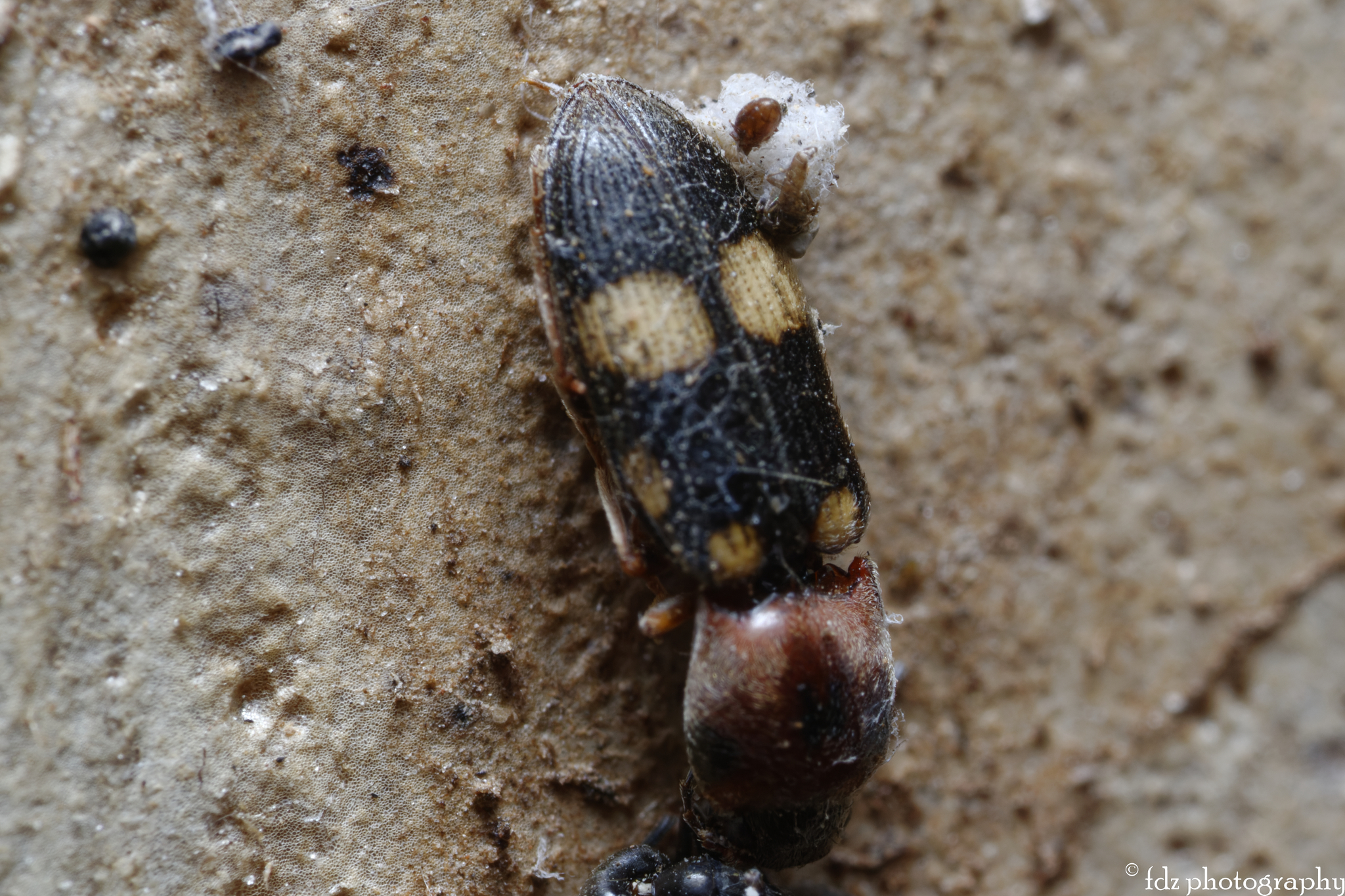
Cardiophorus signatus, Spain

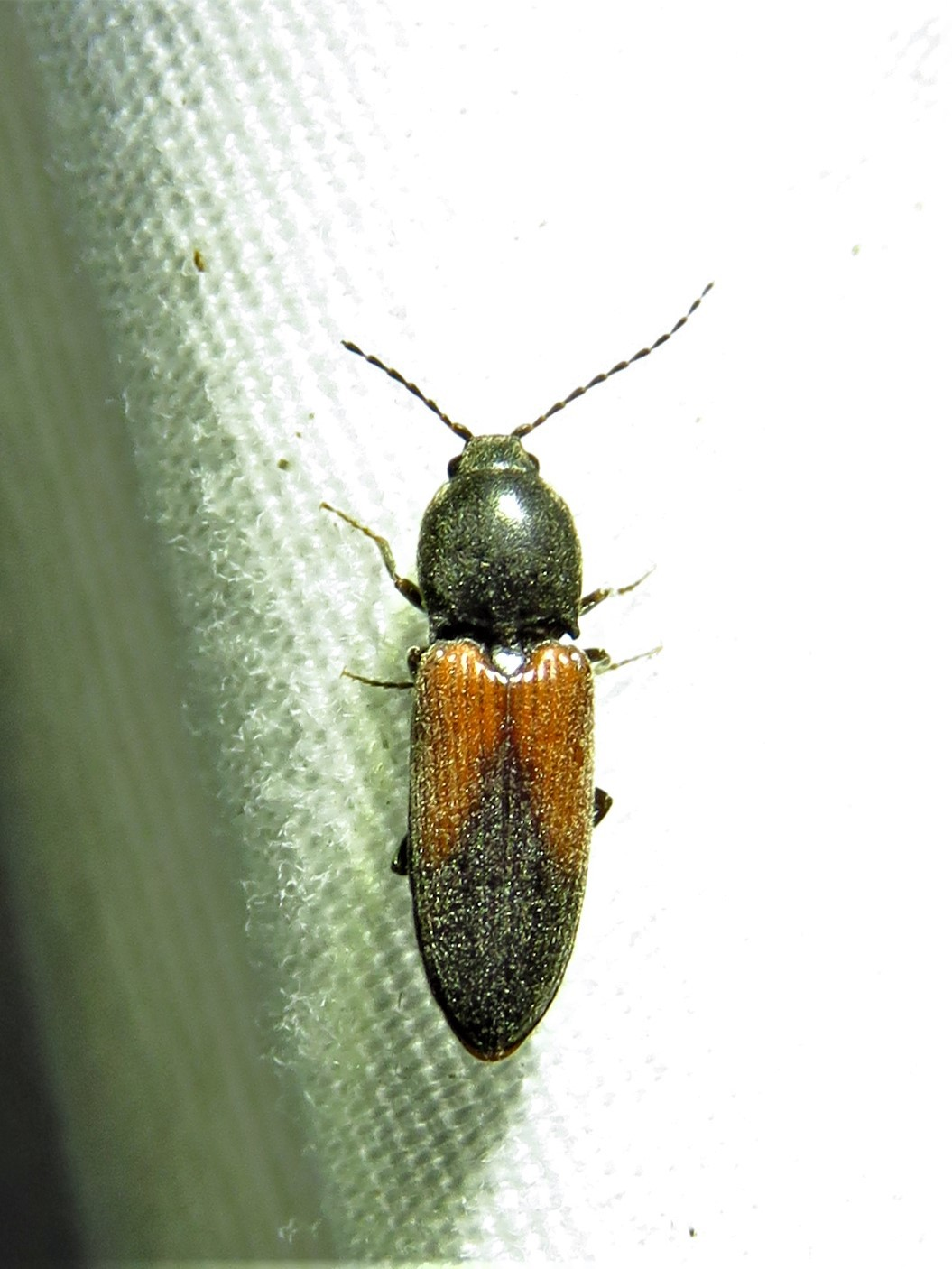
Cardiophorus togatus, Texas

== Species ==
These 180 species belong to the genus Cardiophorus:

- Cardiophorus abora Wurst & Cate, 1994
- Cardiophorus acutus Lanchester, 1971
- Cardiophorus albofasciatus Schwarz, 1893
- Cardiophorus alpestris Lanchester, 1971
- Cardiophorus amplicollis Motschulsky, 1859
- Cardiophorus anatolicus
- Cardiophorus annulicornis Desbrochers des Loges, 1875
- Cardiophorus anticus Erichson, 1840
- Cardiophorus aptopoides
- Cardiophorus aranyos
- Cardiophorus argiolus (Gené, 1836)
- Cardiophorus arozarenai Cobos, 1970
- Cardiophorus asellus Erichson, 1840
- Cardiophorus auarita Liberto & Wurst, 1999
- Cardiophorus baenai Zapata de la Vega & Sánchez-Ruiz, 2013
- Cardiophorus baibaranus Miwa, 1930
- Cardiophorus balearicus Platia & Gudenzi, 1999
- Cardiophorus barrosi Guerin, 1893
- Cardiophorus bellus
- Cardiophorus beloni Desbrochers des Loges, 1870
- Cardiophorus biguttatus (Olivier, 1790)
- Cardiophorus bilyi Platia & Gudenzi, 2000
- Cardiophorus bioculatus Platia, 2010
- Cardiophorus bipunctatus (Fabricius, 1798)
- Cardiophorus bogatschevi Dolin, 1985
- Cardiophorus braunii Heer, 1847
- Cardiophorus brunneipennis Wollaston, 1863
- Cardiophorus brunnipennis Lanchester, 1971
- Cardiophorus burkus
- Cardiophorus cabrerai Cobos, 1970
- Cardiophorus canariensis Wollaston, 1858
- Cardiophorus cardisce (Say, 1834)
- Cardiophorus carnosus Platia & Gudenzi, 2002
- Cardiophorus castillanus Buysson, 1902
- Cardiophorus cobossanchezi Diaz de Castro & Sanchez-Ruiz, 2002
- Cardiophorus cockerelli Wickham, 1916
- Cardiophorus cognatus
- Cardiophorus collaris Erichson, 1840
- Cardiophorus communius Lanchester, 1971
- Cardiophorus convexithorax Desbrochers des Loges, 1869
- Cardiophorus convexulus LeConte, 1853
- Cardiophorus convexus (Say, 1823)
- Cardiophorus crassiusculus Wollaston, 1864
- Cardiophorus deprivatus Wickham, 1916
- Cardiophorus dicronychoides
- Cardiophorus discicollis (Herbst, 1806)
- Cardiophorus divergens Cobos, 1983
- Cardiophorus dolini Mardjanian, 1985
- Cardiophorus ebeninus (Germar, 1824)
- Cardiophorus edwardsi Horn, 1871
- Cardiophorus eleonorae (Gené, 1836)
- Cardiophorus exaratus Erichson, 1840
- Cardiophorus exhumatus Cockerell, 1925
- Cardiophorus femoratus Wollaston, 1854
- Cardiophorus fenestratus LeConte, 1859
- Cardiophorus fernandezi Cobos, 1970
- Cardiophorus florissantensis Wickham, 1916
- Cardiophorus foveiventris Schwarz, 1900
- Cardiophorus foveolatus Schwarz, 1900
- Cardiophorus frequens Platia & Gudenzi, 2002
- Cardiophorus freudei Platia & Gudenzi, 2000
- Cardiophorus frigidus Cobos, 1961
- Cardiophorus gagates Erichson, 1840
- Cardiophorus getschmanni Candeze, 1880
- Cardiophorus gianassoi Platia, 2010
- Cardiophorus globulicollis Wollaston, 1862
- Cardiophorus golestanicus Platia, 2010
- Cardiophorus gomerensis Cobos, 1970
- Cardiophorus gracilis Wollaston, 1864
- Cardiophorus gramineus (Scopoli, 1763)
- Cardiophorus guanche Cobos, 1970
- Cardiophorus guayote Wurst & Cate, 1994
- Cardiophorus hauseri Schwarz, 1900
- Cardiophorus hayekae Platia & Gudenzi, 2002
- Cardiophorus hayeki Cobos, 1970
- Cardiophorus hierrensis Franz, 1980
- Cardiophorus hinkei Frivaldszky, 1837
- Cardiophorus hispanicus Cobos, 1961
- Cardiophorus ichnusae Liberto & Rattu, 2021
- Cardiophorus impressiventris Schwarz, 1900
- Cardiophorus inclusus Quedenfeldt, 1885
- Cardiophorus inflatus Cobos, 1970
- Cardiophorus insularis Cobos, 1959
- Cardiophorus italicus Platia & Bartolozzi, 1988
- Cardiophorus jacquelinae Hawkeswood, Makhan & Turner, 2009
- Cardiophorus jelineki Cate, Platia & Schimmel, 2002
- Cardiophorus jermolenkoi Dolin, 1969
- Cardiophorus kalashiani Mardjanian & Barimani, 2011
- Cardiophorus khnzoriani Mardjanian & Barimani, 2011
- Cardiophorus kindermanni Candeze, 1860
- Cardiophorus klimenkoi Platia, 2008
- Cardiophorus kooskooskiensis Lanchester, 1971
- Cardiophorus koschwitzi Platia & Gudenzi, 1999
- Cardiophorus kronbladi Platia & Gudenzi, 2000
- Cardiophorus kryzhanovskyi Dolin & Chantladze, 1980
- Cardiophorus latiusculus Eschscholtz, 1829
- Cardiophorus lencinai Zapata de la Vega, Sáez Bolaño & Sánchez-Ruiz, 2013
- Cardiophorus liberatus Candèze, 1896
- Cardiophorus lindbergi Cobos, 1970
- Cardiophorus lithographus Wickham, 1916
- Cardiophorus longicornis Lindberg, 1953
- Cardiophorus luridipes Candèze, 1860
- Cardiophorus lutosus Candèze, 1896
- Cardiophorus machadoi Cobos, 1983
- Cardiophorus maculatus Cate, Platia & Schimmel, 2002
- Cardiophorus maculicollis Reiche & Saulcy, 1856
- Cardiophorus magnanii Platia, Furlan & Gudenzi, 2002
- Cardiophorus maritimus Dolin, 1971
- Cardiophorus mateui Cobos, 1970
- Cardiophorus megathorax Faldermann, 1835
- Cardiophorus melampus (Illiger, 1807)
- Cardiophorus mendizabali Cobos, 1970
- Cardiophorus michai Platia & Gudenzi, 2000
- Cardiophorus miniaticollis Candeze, 1860
- Cardiophorus minutus Lindberg, 1950
- Cardiophorus montanus Bland, 1864
- Cardiophorus nathaliae Platia & Schimmel, 1988
- Cardiophorus navarroi Zapata de la Vega & Sánchez-Ruiz, 2013
- Cardiophorus neoarnoldii Platia & Gudenzi, 2000
- Cardiophorus nevadensis Blanchard, 1889
- Cardiophorus nigerrimus Erichson, 1840
- Cardiophorus nigratissimus Buysson, 1891
- Cardiophorus nigroaeneus Dolin & Protzenko, 1965
- Cardiophorus niponicus Lewis, 1894
- Cardiophorus obscurus Wollaston, 1864
- Cardiophorus obtusus Wollaston, 1864
- Cardiophorus oertzeni Schwarz, 1900
- Cardiophorus oromii Cobos, 1978
- Cardiophorus ovipennis Desbrochers des Loges, 1875
- Cardiophorus palmensis Cobos, 1970
- Cardiophorus parvulus Platia & Gudenzi, 2000
- Cardiophorus persianus Cate, Platia & Schimmel, 2002
- Cardiophorus picinus Platia & Gudenzi, 2002
- Cardiophorus pictus (Faldermann, 1835) Faldermann, 1835
- Cardiophorus pinguis
- Cardiophorus platai Cobos, 1979
- Cardiophorus platiai Chassain, 1985
- Cardiophorus plebejus Lanchester, 1971
- Cardiophorus plexus Lanchester, 1971
- Cardiophorus podlussanyi
- Cardiophorus poncyi Buysson, 1903
- Cardiophorus pratensus Lanchester, 1971
- Cardiophorus procerulus Kiesenwetter, 1859
- Cardiophorus propinquus Lanchester, 1971
- Cardiophorus pruinosus Buysson, 1902
- Cardiophorus pseudofebriens Buysson, 1912
- Cardiophorus pubescens Blanchard, 1889
- Cardiophorus requiescens Wickham, 1916
- Cardiophorus riedeli Platia & Gudenzi, 2000
- Cardiophorus roberi Platia & Gudenzi, 2002
- Cardiophorus rotundicollis Frivaldszky, 1845
- Cardiophorus ruficollis (Linnaeus, 1758)
- Cardiophorus ruficruris Brulle, 1832
- Cardiophorus rufipes (Goeze, 1777)
- Cardiophorus ruizi Platia & Gudenzi, 1999
- Cardiophorus sacratus Erichson, 1840
- Cardiophorus signatus (Olivier, 1790)
- Cardiophorus silvanus Lanchester, 1971
- Cardiophorus sodalis Lanchester, 1971
- Cardiophorus sonani Miwa, 1930
- Cardiophorus stolatus Erichson, 1840
- Cardiophorus stussineri Buysson, 1913
- Cardiophorus syriacoides Platia & Cate, 2001
- Cardiophorus taylori Cobos, 1970
- Cardiophorus tenebrosus LeConte, 1853
- Cardiophorus tenelloides Dolin, 1960
- Cardiophorus tenellus Reiche & Saulcy, 1857
- Cardiophorus tenuis
- Cardiophorus terminasiani Mardjanian & Barimani, 2011
- Cardiophorus trimaculatus Schwarz, 1894
- Cardiophorus tumidicollis LeConte, 1853
- Cardiophorus tutus Lanchester, 1971
- Cardiophorus ulcerosus (Géné, 1836)
- Cardiophorus vestigialis Erichson, 1840
- Cardiophorus vestitus Lindberg, 1950
- Cardiophorus vittatus Lindberg, 1953
- Cardiophorus widenfalki Leiler, 1967
- Cardiophorus wollastoni Cobos, 1970
- Cardiophorus yatsenkokhmelevskyi Yablokov-Khnzorian, 1961
- Cardiophorus zianii Platia & Gudenzi, 2002
