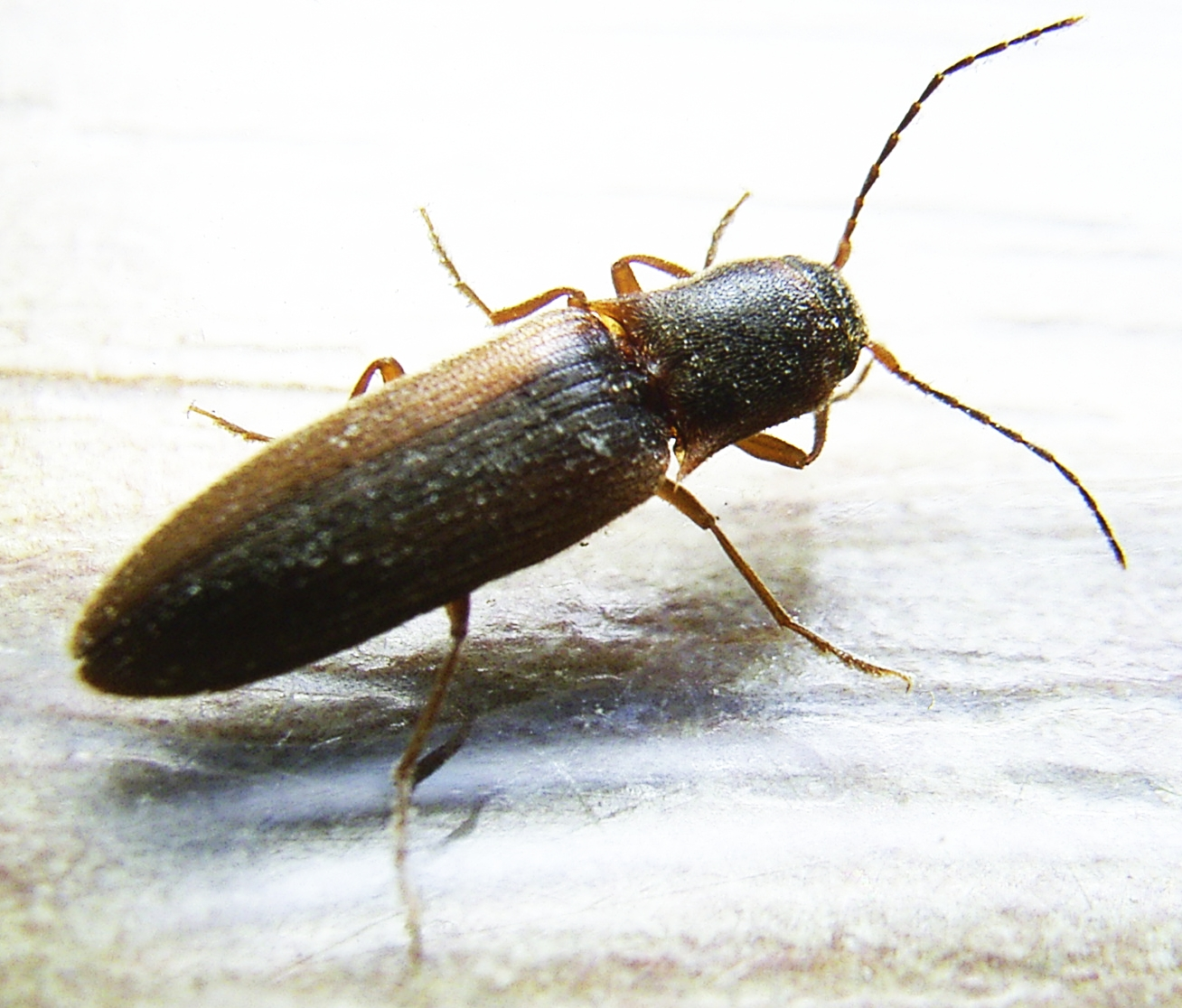
- Dalopius marginatus

Scientific classification
- Domain: Eukaryota
- Kingdom: Animalia
- Phylum: Arthropoda
- Class: Insecta
- Order: Coleoptera
- Suborder: Polyphaga
- Infraorder: Elateriformia
- Family: Elateridae
- Genus: Dalopius; Eschscholtz, 1829

= Dalopius =

Genus of beetles

Dalopius is a genus of beetles belonging to the family Elateridae.

The species of this genus are found in Europe, Japan and Northern America.

== Species ==
- Dalopius agnellus W.J.Brown, 1934
- Dalopius asellus W.J.Brown, 1934
- Dalopius bizen Kishii, 1984
- Dalopius brevicornis W.J.Brown, 1934
- Dalopius cognatus W.J.Brown, 1934
- Dalopius corvinus W.J.Brown, 1934
- Dalopius fucatus W.J.Brown, 1934
- Dalopius fuscipes W.J.Brown, 1934
- Dalopius gartrelli W.J.Brown, 1934
- Dalopius gentilis W.J.Brown, 1934
- Dalopius gracilis W.J.Brown, 1934
- Dalopius ignobilis W.J.Brown, 1934
- Dalopius inordinatus W.J.Brown, 1934
- Dalopius insolens W.J.Brown, 1934
- Dalopius insolitus W.J.Brown, 1934
- Dalopius insulanus W.J.Brown, 1934
- Dalopius marginatus (Linnaeus, 1758)
- Dalopius maritimus W.J.Brown, 1934
- Dalopius mirabilis W.J.Brown, 1934
- Dalopius naomii (Kishii, 1981)
- Dalopius pallidus W.J.Brown, 1934
- Dalopius parvulus W.J.Brown, 1934
- Dalopius patagiatus (Lewis, 1894)
- Dalopius pennsylvanicus W.J.Brown, 1934
- Dalopius sellatus Mannerheim, 1852
- Dalopius spretus W.J.Brown, 1934
- Dalopius suspectus W.J.Brown, 1934
- Dalopius tristis W.J.Brown, 1934
- Dalopius vagus W.J.Brown, 1934
- Dalopius vernus W.J.Brown, 1934
