= List of Agriotes species =

Species of click beetles

The following species of click beetles in the genus Agriotes (family Elateridae, order Coleoptera) are recognized (status 2026).

Basionyms are given in square brackets.

- Agriotes acuminatus (Stephens 1830) [Cataphagus acuminatus] (central, eastern and southern Europe, Turkey, Armenia)
- Agriotes acutus Champion 1896 (Central America)
- Agriotes adanensis Pic 1910 (Turkey)
- Agriotes adlbaueri Platia & Schimmel 1992 (Turkey)
- Agriotes aegeus Platia & Kakiopoulos 2014 (Greece)
- Agriotes aequalis Schwarz 1891 (Italy)
- Agriotes agonischioides Fleutiaux 1918 (Vietnam)
- Agriotes akbesianus Platia & Pedroni 2026 (Turkey)
- Agriotes akrawiorum Platia, Ismael & Pedroni 2026 (Iraq)
- Agriotes alcarazensis Platia & Gudenzi 2009 (Spain)
- Agriotes alternus Candèze 1863 (Mexico)
- Agriotes amabilis Candèze 1863 (Mexico)
- Agriotes anatolicus Platia 2003 (Turkey, Greece)
- Agriotes andalusiacus Franz 1967 (Spain)
- Agriotes angustatus Champion 1896 (Mexico)
- Agriotes angustus Fleutiaux 1939 (Vietnam)
- Agriotes apicalis LeConte 1884 (western North America)
- Agriotes aquilus Platia 2003 (Turkey)
- Agriotes arcanus Brown 1933 (north-eastern North America)
- Agriotes asaokai Ohira 1994 (Japan, Ryukyu Islands)
- Agriotes audisioi Platia & Schimmel 1992 (Turkey)
- Agriotes australasiae Blanchard 1853 (Iles Arrow = Aru Islands, Indonesia)
- Agriotes australis Fairmaire 1883 (southern Chile, southern Argentina)
- Agriotes avulsus (LeConte 1853) [Dolopius avulsus] (north-central and north-eastern North America)
- Agriotes ayani Platia 2011 (Turkey)
- Agriotes babanus Kishii 1989 (Taiwan)
- Agriotes bagherii Platia, Furlan & Gudenzi 2002 (Iran)
- Agriotes balikesirensis Nemeth & Platia 2014 (Turkey)
- Agriotes balkei Platia 2021 (China: Shaanxi)
- Agriotes baotianmanensis Platia 2007 (China)
- Agriotes barkulensis Jagemann 1942 (China, Turkestan, Barkul-Chami – now Xinjiang)
- Agriotes barriesi Cate & Platia 1997 (Turkey)
- Agriotes bartaki Platia 2017 (Bulgaria)
- Agriotes becvari Platia 2007 (southern China)
- Agriotes belfragei Becker 1956 (southern U.S.A.)
- Agriotes bicolor Candèze 1863 (Mexico)
- Agriotes binhus Fleutiaux 1939 (Vietnam)
- Agriotes binotatus Champion 1896 (Guatemala)
- Agriotes bivittatus Van Dyke 1932 (Oregon, U.S.A.)
- Agriotes bogatschevi Dolin 1969 (south-western Russia, Azerbaijan, Georgia, Turkey)
- Agriotes bonnairei du Buysson 1889 (Algeria)
- Agriotes bonvouloirei (Candèze 1874) [Hemirhipus bonvouloirei] (French Guiana)
- Agriotes borowieciorum Platia, Schimmel & Tarnawski 2009 (Turkey)
- Agriotes brevis Candèze 1863 (central/southern Europe and neighbouring parts of western Asia)
- Agriotes breviusculus (Candèze 1863) [Agonischius breviusculus] (southern China, Hong Kong, Taiwan, Vietnam, Laos)
- Agriotes brunneipennis (Fleutiaux 1902) [Agonischius brunneipennis] (Vietnam)
- Agriotes brunneus Schaeffer 1916 (western U.S.A.)
- Agriotes bulgaricus Platia & Gudenzi 2007 (Bulgaria)
- Agriotes caecus Knull 1959 (Ohio, U.S.A.)
- Agriotes caspicus von Heyden 1883 (western Asia, Turkmenistan and neighbouring countries)
- Agriotes castaneipennis Champion 1896 (Guatemala)
- Agriotes chiliensis (Schwarz 1904) [Paracosmesus chiliensis] (Chile)
- Agriotes cilicensis Platia & Gudenzi 1998 (Turkey)
- Agriotes cinereiventris Champion 1896 (Mexico)
- Agriotes colchicus Gurjeva 1975 (Caucasus, Georgia)
- Agriotes collaris (LeConte 1853) [Dolopius collaris] (north-eastern North America)
- Agriotes colonnellii Guglielmi & Platia 1985 (Turkey, Israel, Syria, Jordan)
- Agriotes concolor Fleutiaux 1925 (Vietnam)
- Agriotes conjugatus (Candèze 1891) [Agonischius conjugatus] (Myanmar)
- Agriotes connexivus Schwarz 1891 (Morocco)
- Agriotes conspicuus Schwarz 1891 (Turkey)
- Agriotes constrictus Reitter 1900 (Syria, Iran, Turkey)
- Agriotes coomani Fleutiaux 1939 (Vietnam)
- Agriotes cooteri Platia 2021(China: Zheijang)
- Agriotes corsicus Candèze 1863 (Italy, southern France, eastern Spain)
- Agriotes crassiusculus Platia & Gudenzi 1998 (Turkey)
- Agriotes crassus Platia 2010 (Uzbekistan)
- Agriotes cribrithorax Pic 1910 (Turkey)
- Agriotes criddlei Van Dyke 1932 (north-western and north-central North America)
- Agriotes cruciatus Champion 1896 (Guatemala)
- Agriotes curticollis Champion 1896 (Central America)
- Agriotes curtus Candèze 1878 (southern Spain, Portugal - Morocco: Agriotes curtus kocheri Franz 1976)
- Agriotes cylindricus Van Dyke 1932 (California, U.S.A.)
- Agriotes danieli Platia & Nemeth 2011 (Iran)
- Agriotes defreinai Platia & Gudenzi 1998 (Turkey)
- Agriotes deletus Fleutiaux 1939 (Vietnam)
- Agriotes depressus Schwarz 1891 [Agriotes gurgistanus var. depressus] (Caucasus, Turkey)
- Agriotes desbrochersi du Buysson 1890 (Algeria)
- Agriotes dilataticoxis du Buysson 1904 (Morocco)
- Agriotes doboszi Platia, Schimmel & Tarnawski 2009 (Turkey)
- Agriotes dolini Platia 2010 (Kyrgyzstan, Kazakhstan)
- Agriotes dongchuanensis Platia 2021 (southern China)
- Agriotes dualis Fleutiaux 1939 (Vietnam)
- Agriotes dubius Fleutiaux 1907 (southern Chile)
- Agriotes duhokensis Platia & Akrawi 2013 (Iraq)
- Agriotes duporti Fleutiaux 1939 (Vietnam)
- Agriotes dusaneki Platia & Gudenzi 1998 (Turkey)
- Agriotes eggeri Platia 2017 (Greece)
- Agriotes elegantissimus (Candèze 1881) [Hemirhipus elegantissimus] (Uruguay, northern Argentina)
- Agriotes elegantulus Lewis 1894 (Japan)
- Agriotes ellenicus Cate & Platia 1997 (Greece)
- Agriotes emaciatus Platia & Gudenzi 1997 (Syria)
- Agriotes erhaiensis Platia 2007 (southern China)
- Agriotes erzurumensis Platia 2017 (Turkey)
- Agriotes espinosus Becker 1956 (western U.S.A.)
- Agriotes ferrugineipennis (LeConte 1861) [Dolopius ferrugineipennis] (north-western North America)
- Agriotes flavobasalis von Heyden 1889 (Portugal, Madeira Isl.)
- Agriotes francki (Fleutiaux 1934) [Agonischius francki] (southern China)
- Agriotes fucosus (LeConte 1853) [Dolopius fucosus] (north-central and north-eastern North America)
- Agriotes fulgens Ohira 1966 (Taiwan)
- Agriotes fulvescens Candèze 1863 (Mexico)
- Agriotes fulvus Fleutiaux 1939 (Vietnam)
- Agriotes furlani Platia 2003 (Turkey, Greece)
- Agriotes fusiformis Candèze 1878 (China)
- Agriotes gaditanus Zapata de la Vega & Sánchez-Ruiz 2012 (Spain, Morocco)
- Agriotes gallicus Lacordaire 1835 (continental parts of central Europe)
- Agriotes ganglbaueri Schwarz 1891 (Near East: Syria, Lebanon)
- Agriotes gazureki Platia & Pedroni 2025 (Albania, Greece: Kerkira Is.)
- Agriotes germaini Fleutiaux 1907 (southern Chile)
- Agriotes gigas Platia 2021 (southern China, Guangxi Prov.)
- Agriotes goksunensis Platia 2004 (Turkey)
- Agriotes gongshanensis Platia & Sechi 2023 (southern China)
- Agriotes gracilis (Miwa 1931) [Agonischius gracilis] (Taiwan)
- Agriotes graecus Franz 1967 (south-eastern Europe, Greece, Bulgaria, Croatia and Turkey)
- Agriotes grandicollis Fleutiaux 1939 (Vietnam)
- Agriotes grandinii Candèze 1863 (Algeria, Morocco, Tunesia)
- Agriotes granulosus Platia & Schimmel 1992 (Turkey)
- Agriotes gratiosus Fleutiaux 1925 (Vietnam)
- Agriotes guadulpensis Candèze 1863 (Caribbean: Martinique, Guadeloupe)
- Agriotes guanxianensis Platia 2007 (southern China)
- Agriotes guanxiensis Platia 2009 (southern China)
- Agriotes guatemalensis Champion 1896 (Guatemala)
- Agriotes guizhouensis Platia & Sechi 2023 (southern China)
- Agriotes gulnariensis Platia 2011 (Turkey)
- Agriotes gurgistanus (Faldermann 1835) [Synaptus gurgistanus] (eastern Europe, parts of western Asia)
- Agriotes gurjevae Platia 2010 (Tajikistan)
- Agriotes halgurdi Platia & Pulvirenti 2024 (Iraq)
- Agriotes hatayensis Platia 2010 (Turkey)
- Agriotes hedini Fleutiaux 1936 (China)
- Agriotes heinzi Platia 2017 (Turkey)
- Agriotes heydeni Schwarz 1891 (Turkey)
- Agriotes hilaris Candèze 1863 (Mexico, Guatemala)
- Agriotes hirayamai Miwa 1934 (Japan, Okinawa)
- Agriotes hirsutus Champion 1896 (Mexico)
- Agriotes hispalensis Zapata de la Vega & Sánchez-Ruiz 2012 (Spain)
- Agriotes hivae Platia 2008 (Iran)
- Agriotes hoodi Becker 1956 (north-western North America)
- Agriotes imperfectus LeConte 1884 (California, U.S.A.)
- Agriotes incallidus Champion 1896 (Central America)
- Agriotes incisus Platia, Konvička & Zhang 2019 (China, Sichuan)
- Agriotes indosinesis Fleutiaux 1939 (Vietnam, Laos)
- Agriotes informis Schwarz 1891 (Turkey)
- Agriotes infuscatus Desbrochers des Loges 1870 (south-eastern Europe and parts of western Asia)
- Agriotes insanus Candèze 1863 (eastern U.S.)
- Agriotes insolitus Champion 1896 (Mexico)
- Agriotes integricollis Reitter 1911 [Agriotes (Agriodrastus) acuminatus v. integricollis] (Caucasus, Turkey)
- Agriotes intermedius Platia 2007 (southern and central China)
- Agriotes interstitialis Fleutiaux 1939 (Vietnam)
- Agriotes iranicus Platia, Furlan & Gudenzi, 2002 (Iran)
- Agriotes iraqensis Platia & Gudenzi 1997 (Iraq)
- Agriotes isabellinus (Melsheimer 1845) [Dolopius isabellinus] (north-eastern North America)
- Agriotes izmirensis Cate & Platia 1997 (Turkey)
- Agriotes jeanvoinei (Fleutiaux 1939) [Tinecus jeanvoinei] (Vietnam)
- Agriotes jingkei Platia 2007 (southern China)
- Agriotes jiulongensis Platia 2021 (southern China, Sichuan Prov.)
- Agriotes kabateki Platia & Sechi 2023 (southern China)
- Agriotes kairouzi Platia 2011 (Lebanon)
- Agriotes kambaitinus Fleutiaux 1942 (Myanmar)
- Agriotes kamus Fleutiaux 1939 (Laos)
- Agriotes kanitozyensis Platia, Ismael & Pedroni 2026 (Iraq)
- Agriotes karsantianus Pic 1910 (Turkey)
- Agriotes kinzelbachi Platia & Schimmel 1994 (Syria, Israel)
- Agriotes kirghisicus Iablokoff-Khnzorian 1970 (Kyrgyzstan)
- Agriotes koltzei Reitter 1890 (eastern Siberia, Vladivostok)
- Agriotes kraatzi Schwarz 1891 (Turkey)
- Agriotes kubani Platia & Gudenzi 1997 (Syria)
- Agriotes kumingensis Platia 2007 (southern China)
- Agriotes kurdistanus Platia & Akrawi 2013 (Iraq, Turkey)
- Agriotes laevicarinatus Platia & Gudenzi 1999 (Greece)
- Agriotes laoticus Fleutiaux 1939 (Laos)
- Agriotes lapicida Faldermann 1835 (parts of western Asia, south-eastern Europe)
- Agriotes laszlopappi Platia & Nemeth 2011 (Afghanistan)
- Agriotes lateralis Candèze 1878 (Costa Rica, Panama)
- Agriotes leinfesti Platia & Gudenzi 1998 (Turkey)
- Agriotes leucophaeatus Candèze 1873 (Japan)
- Agriotes leuthneri Platia & Gudenzi 1997 (Syria)
- Agriotes libanensis Platia 2011 (Lebanon)
- Agriotes ligatus Candèze 1878 (Guatemala, Mexico)
- Agriotes lijiangensis Platia 2007 (southern China)
- Agriotes limosus (LeConte 1853) [Dolopius limosus] (northern parts of North America)
- Agriotes linearis Fleutiaux 1939 (Vietnam)
- Agriotes lineatus (Linnaeus 1767) [Elater lineatus] (Europe, western Asia, some parts of North America)
- Agriotes lineipennis Candèze 1863 (Mexico)
- Agriotes litigiosus (Rossi 1792) [Elater litigiosus] (southern Europe)
- Agriotes liukuiensis Kishii 1989 (Taiwan)
- Agriotes lizleri Platia 2003 (Turkey)
- Agriotes longipennis Candèze 1863 (Mexico, Guatemala)
- Agriotes longipronotum Kabalak, Sert, Özgen & Platia 2013 (Turkey, Iraq)
- Agriotes longithorax Becker 1956 (western U.S.A.)
- Agriotes longiusculus Platia 2007 (southern China)
- Agriotes lorestanicus Platia & Pulvirenti 2020 (Iran)
- Agriotes lundbergi Platia 1989 (Turkey)
- Agriotes luteonotatus Pic 1913 (Lebanon)
- Agriotes luteus Fleutiaux 1940 (Vietnam)
- Agriotes maceki Platia & Gudenzi 1997 (Syria)
- Agriotes maculatus Platia 2007 (China, Laos)
- Agriotes magnanii Platia & Gudenzi 1996 (Cyprus)
- Agriotes malaisei Fleutiaux 1942 (Myanmar)
- Agriotes malipoensis Platia 2007 (southern China)
- Agriotes mancus (Say 1823) [Elater mancus] (north-eastern parts of North America)
- Agriotes marocanus Platia 2008 (Morocco)
- Agriotes medvedevi Dolin 1960 (Azerbaijan, Austria, Hungary, Moldavia, Romania, Slovakia, south-western Russia, Ukraine)
- Agriotes melanurus Fleutiaux 1925 (Vietnam)
- Agriotes meilixuensis Platia 2007 (Tibet)
- Agriotes mertliki Platia 2003 (Turkey)
- Agriotes meticulosus Candèze 1863 (western and central Asia)
- Agriotes mexicanus Champion 1896 (Mexico)
- Agriotes miniatocollis Chevrolat 1835 (Mexico)
- Agriotes minusculus Platia 2007 (eastern China)
- Agriotes minutus Zurita-Garcia 2012 (Mexico)
- Agriotes mixtus Champion 1896 (Mexico)
- Agriotes modestus Kiesenwetter 1858 (southern and central Europe as well as parts of western Asia and northern Africa)
- Agriotes mollardi Fleutiaux 1918 (Vietnam)
- Agriotes montanus LeConte 1884 (north-western U.S.A.)
- Agriotes monticolus Champion 1896 (Guatemala)
- Agriotes murzini Platia 2021 (SW China, Guizhou Prov.)
- Agriotes nadezhdae Tsherepanov 1965 (west Sibiria, eastern Kazakhstan, Mongolia, north-western China)
- Agriotes nigricans Platia & Gudenzi 1997 (Syria, Lebanon)
- Agriotes nigropubens Reitter 1904 (Turkey)
- Agriotes nigror Platia 2003 (Turkey)
- Agriotes nikodymi Platia 2007 (southern China)
- Agriotes notatus Candèze 1863 (Mexico)
- Agriotes novus Fleutiaux 1939 (Vietnam)
- Agriotes nuceus Fairmaire 1866 (Turkey, Syria)
- Agriotes oblongicollis (Melsheimer 1845) [Dolopius oblongicollis] (eastern U.S.A.)
- Agriotes obscuricollis (Jiang 1999) [Dolopius obscuricollis] (southern China)
- Agriotes obscurus (Linnaeus, 1758) [Elater obscurus] (Europe, northern Asia, north-western North America)
- Agriotes ochraceipilosus (Fleutiaux 1942) [Hemirhipus ochraceipilosus] (French Guiana)
- Agriotes ogurae Lewis 1894 (Japan)
- Agriotes olivieri Desbrochers des Loges 1875 (Algeria, Tunesia, Morocco)
- Agriotes opacicollis Champion 1896 (Guatemala)
- Agriotes opaculus (LeConte 1859) [Dolopius opaculus] (north-western North America)
- Agriotes oreas Gistel 1857 (Austria)
- Agriotes oregonensis Becker 1956 (north-western U.S.A.)
- Agriotes orientalis Fleutiaux 1939 (Vietnam)
- Agriotes oxianus Iablokoff-Khnzorian 1970 (Afghanistan, Tadzhikistan, Turkmenistan, Uzbekistan)
- Agriotes pallidulus (Illiger 1807) [Elater pallidulus] (western and central Europe, parts of eastern Europe)
- Agriotes paludum Kiesenwetter 1859 (southern Europe, Turkey and the Near East)
- Agriotes pamirensis Gurjeva 1978 (Tajikistan)
- Agriotes parvus Platia & Pulvirenti 2024 (Iraq)
- Agriotes passosi Platia & Serrano 2002 (Portugal, Spain)
- Agriotes pauxillus Champion 1896 (Mexico)
- Agriotes pavesii Platia & Gudenzi 2001 (Greece)
- Agriotes pecirkai Platia & Pulvirenti 2022 (Turkey)
- Agriotes pectoralis Champion 1896 (Guatemala)
- Agriotes pedregalensis Zurita-Garcia 2012 (Mexico)
- Agriotes petterssoni Platia & Gudenzi 2000 (Turkey)
- Agriotes pexus Candèze 1863 (Mexico, Guatemala)
- Agriotes pilosellus (Schönherr 1817) [Elater pilosellus, new name for Elater pilosus Panzer 1804] (Europe and parts of northern Africa and western Asia)
- Agriotes platiai Kabalak & Sert 2009 (Turkey)
- Agriotes podlussanyi Platia & Nemeth 2011 (Turkey)
- Agriotes propinquus Fleutiaux 1939 (Vietnam)
- Agriotes propleuralis Platia & Gudenzi 1998 (Turkey, Georgia)
- Agriotes proximoides Platia, Furlan & Gudenzi, 2002 (Iran)
- Agriotes proximus Schwarz 1891 (southern Europe as well as parts of north-western Africa and south-western Asia)
- Agriotes pseudobscurus Platia 2007 (central and northern China)
- Agriotes pubescens Melsheimer 1845 (north-central and north-eastern North America)
- Agriotes pulcherrimus Candèze 1863 (Mexico, Guatemala)
- Agriotes quadraticollis Champion 1896 (Guatemala)
- Agriotes quadrilineatus Champion 1896 (Guatemala)
- Agriotes quadrivittatus Candèze 1863 (Mexico, Guatemala, Belize)
- Agriotes quebecensis Brown 1933 (north-eastern and north-central North America)
- Agriotes qinghaiensis Platia 2021 (north-western China)
- Agriotes radula Debrochers des Loges 1875 (Turkey, Syria, Lebanon, Israel)
- Agriotes rahmei Platia & Nemeth 2011 (Syria, Turkey)
- Agriotes rapuzzii Platia, Ismael & Pedroni 2026 (Iraq)
- Agriotes reitteri Schwarz 1891 (West Caucasus, Turkey)
- Agriotes rhombus Zurita-Garcia 2012 (Mexico)
- Agriotes riesei Platia 2004 (Turkey)
- Agriotes roberi Platia & Kakiopoulos 2014 (Greece)
- Agriotes rotundicollis Becker 1956 (western U.S.A.)
- Agriotes roznerorum Nemeth & Platia 2014 (Syria)
- Agriotes rufipalpis (Brullé 1832) [Elater rufipalpis] (parts of south-eastern Europe and western Turkey)
- Agriotes rufohumeralis Knull 1959 (Arkansas, U.S.A.)
- Agriotes rufus (Fleutiaux 1918) [Agonischius rufus] (Vietnam, Cambodia, southern China)
- Agriotes rugatus Fleutiaux 1939 (Vietnam)
- Agriotes rugipennis Schwarz 1891 (northern China, Mongalia, eastern Russia)
- Agriotes ruzickai Platia 2021 (China: Yunnan)
- Agriotes sagittus Becker 1956 (western U.S.A.)
- Agriotes sakaryaensis Nemeth & Platia 2014 (Turkey)
- Agriotes samai Platia, Furlan & Gudenzi, 2002 (Iran)
- Agriotes sameki Platia 2003 (Turkey)
- Agriotes scapularis (Candèze 1863) [Agonischius scapularis] (Hong Kong, China)
- Agriotes schneideri Platia 2007 (southern China)
- Agriotes schuberti Platia 2004 (Turkey)
- Agriotes schurmanni Platia & Gudenzi 1998 (Turkey)
- Agriotes sericatus Schwarz 1891 (northern China, Korea, Mongolia, eastern Russia)
- Agriotes sexualis Platia 2004 (Turkey)
- Agriotes shiniushanensis Platia & Sechi 2023 (southern China)
- Agriotes shirozui Kishii 1991 (Taiwan)
- Agriotes shokhini Platia & Sechi 2023 (southern China)
- Agriotes shykshanus Kishii 1989 (Taiwan)
- Agriotes siciliensis Pic 1912 [new name for Agriotes buyssoni Ragusa 1911] (Sicily, Italy)
- Agriotes sikorae Schwarz 1896 (Madagascar)
- Agriotes silvanensis Platia & Nemeth 2011 (Turkey)
- Agriotes simplex (Candèze 1891) [Agonischius simplex] (Myanmar, Thailand, Laos, China)
- Agriotes sinensis Platia 2007 (eastern China)
- Agriotes singularius Fleutiaux 1940 (Vietnam?)
- Agriotes sirnakensis Platia 2011 (Turkey)
- Agriotes siteki Platia 2008 (Turkey)
- Agriotes solai Platia 2004 (Turkey)
- Agriotes solitarius Fleutiaux 1939 (Laos)
- Agriotes sordidus (Illiger 1807) [Elater sordidus] (western Europe and north-western Africa)
- Agriotes sparsus LeConte 1884 (north-western U.S.A.)
- Agriotes spiniformis Platia 2021 (mainland Malaysia, Perak, Cameron Highlands)
- Agriotes sputator (Linnaeus 1758) [Elater sputator] (Europe, parts of northern Asia incl. Sichuan Prov. in China, eastern Canada)
- Agriotes squalidus Schwarz 1891 (Russia Far East, Mongolia, north-western China)
- Agriotes stabilis (LeConte 1853) [Dolopius stabilis] (north-central and north-eastern North America)
- Agriotes starcki Schwarz 1891 (West Caucasus, Turkey, south-eastern Europe)
- Agriotes stepanovorum Orlov 1997 (south-western Russia, Caucasus)
- Agriotes striatopunctatus (Grimmer 1841) [Elater striatopunctatus] (Austria)
- Agriotes strigosus Kiesenwetter 1858 (Greece, Turkey, Syria, Israel, Lebanon, Iran)
- Agriotes subfasciatus Platia 2007 (southern China)
- Agriotes sublineatus Champion 1896 (Costa Rica)
- Agriotes subsulcatus Pic 1913 (Turkey)
- Agriotes subvittatus Motschulsky 1859 (eastern Russia, Mongolia, northern China, Japan)
- Agriotes sylviae Cate & Platia 1997 (Syria)
- Agriotes syriacus Platia & Gudenzi 1997 (Syria)
- Agriotes szekelykalmani Platia & Nemeth 2011 (Turkey)
- Agriotes tadzhikistanicus Gurjeva 1967 (Kyrgyzstan, Tajikistan, Turkmenistan, Uzbekistan)
- Agriotes taeniatus Candèze 1863 (Mexico, Guatemala)
- Agriotes taipoensis Platia 2007 (Hong Kong)
- Agriotes takasago Kishii 1989 (Taiwan)
- Agriotes tamdaoensis Fleutiaux 1939 (Vietnam)
- Agriotes tanahrataensis Platia 2021 (mainland Malaysia, Perak)
- Agriotes tardus Brown 1933 (north-western North America)
- Agriotes tauricus von Heyden 1882 (Ukraine, Azerbaijan, Armenia, Georgia, south-western Russia, Turkey)
- Agriotes tekirdagensis Platia 2012 (Turkey)
- Agriotes thevenetii Horn 1873 (western North America)
- Agriotes tibetanus Platia 2007 (Tibet)
- Agriotes tomentosus Fleutiaux 1939 (Vietnam)
- Agriotes torquatus LeConte 1884 (California, U.S.A.)
- Agriotes tranninhus Fleutiaux 1939 (Laos)
- Agriotes transcaucasicus Dolin 2003 (Caucasus, south-western Russia)
- Agriotes tres Fleutiaux 1939 (Vietnam)
- Agriotes trilineatus Champion 1896 (Nicaragua)
- Agriotes trinotatus Zurita-Garcia 2012 (Mexico)
- Agriotes tristiculus Reitter 1906 [new name for Agriotes tristis Schwarz 1891] (Turkey)
- Agriotes trivittatus Champion 1896 (Nicaragua)
- Agriotes turcicus Candèze 1863 (south-eastern Europe, western Asia)
- Agriotes turkmenicus Platia & Gudenzi 1999 (Turkmenistan)
- Agriotes turnai Platia & Sechi 2023 (southern China)
- Agriotes ulkeri Platia 2011 (Turkey)
- Agriotes unicolor Koenig 1889 (eastern Russia, Mongolia, north-western China)
- Agriotes ustulatus (Schaller 1783) [Elater ustulatus] (Europe and parts of western Asia)
- Agriotes vaccinus Candèze 1863 (Mexico, Guatemala)
- Agriotes vandykei Becker 1956 (western U.S.A.)
- Agriotes vastus Gurjeva 1972 (Kazakhstan)
- Agriotes verdugoi Zapata de la Vega & Sánchez-Ruiz 2012 (Spain)
- Agriotes vicinus Fleutiaux 1907 (southern Chile)
- Agriotes villosus (Fleutiaux 1918) [Agonischius villosus] (Vietnam)
- Agriotes virgatus Candèze 1863 (Mexico)
- Agriotes viti Platia 2009 (southern China, Tibet)
- Agriotes vitisimilis Platia & Sechi 2023 (Hainan Isl., China)
- Agriotes weishanensis Platia 2007 (southern China)
- Agriotes werneri Platia 2003 (Turkey)
- Agriotes witzgalli Platia & Schimmel 1993 (Turkey)
- Agriotes wladimiri Platia & Pulvirenti 2021 (Turkmenistan)
- Agriotes wudangshanensis Platia 2007 (eastern China)
- Agriotes wuyishanensis Platia 2007 (southern China)
- Agriotes xiachayuensis Platia 2007 (Tibet)
- Agriotes xinhuaensis Platia 2007 (southern China)
- Agriotes xinpingensis Platia & Sechi 2023 (southern China)
- Agriotes yunnanensis Platia 2021 (south-western China)
- Agriotes yushihanus Kishii 1989 (Taiwan)
- Agriotes zhushengensis Platia & Sechi 2023 (southern China)
- Agriotes zinovjevi Gurjeva 1967 (eastern and far-eastern Russia, Mongolia, North Korea, northern China)
