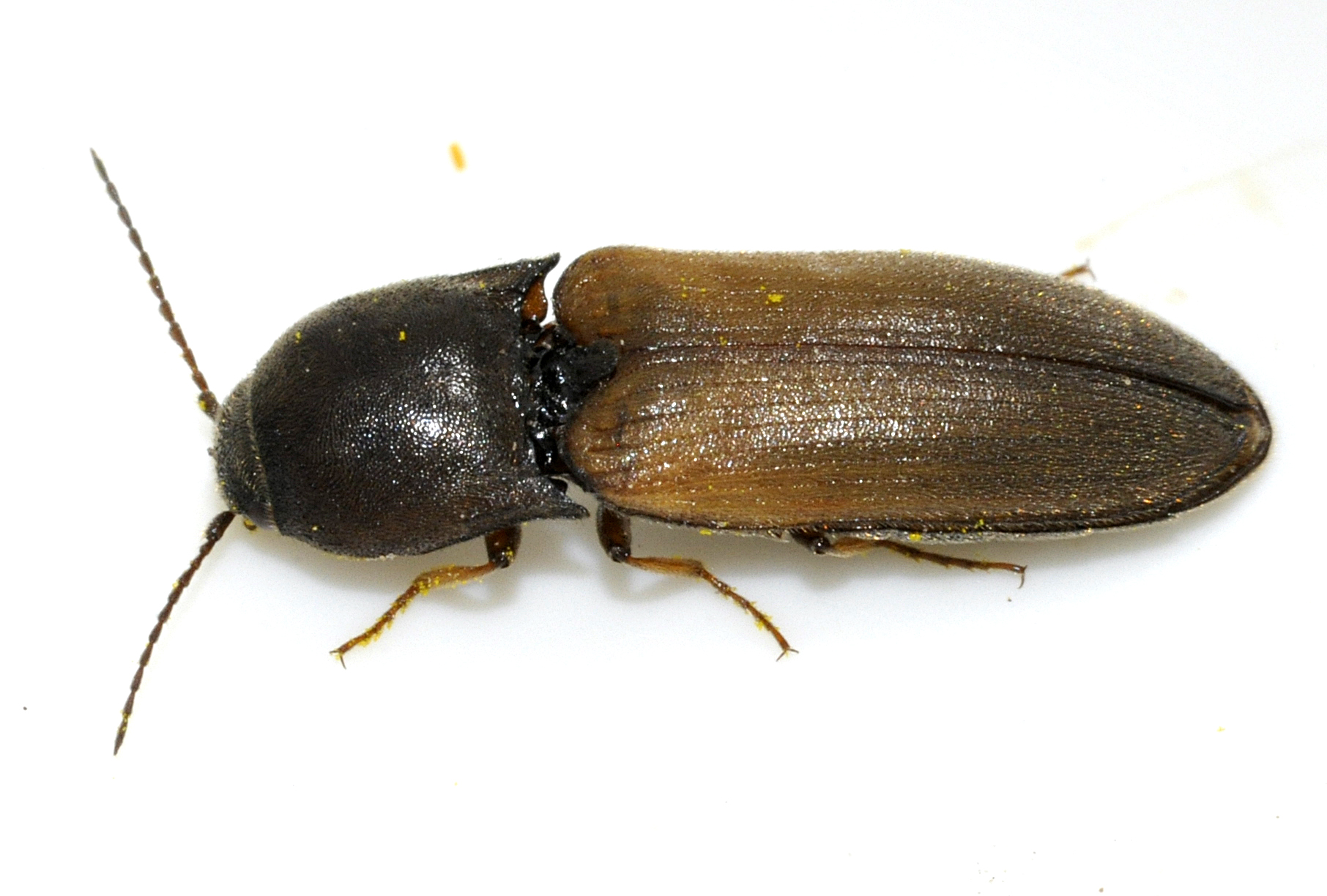
- light color form

Scientific classification
- Kingdom: Animalia
- Phylum: Arthropoda
- Class: Insecta
- Order: Coleoptera
- Suborder: Polyphaga
- Infraorder: Elateriformia
- Family: Elateridae
- Genus: Agriotes
- Species: A. ustulatus

Binomial name
- Agriotes ustulatus (Schaller 1783)

Synonyms
- Elater ustulatus Schaller 1783; Elater blandus Germar 1824; Agriotes gilvellus Lacordaire 1835; Agriotes confusus Bach 1854; Agriotes nitidicollis Miller 1881

= Agriotes ustulatus =

Species of beetle

Agriotes ustulatus, commonly known as western click beetle, is a species from the family Elateridae that is widely distributed in central and southern Europe. The larvae (wireworms) are regarded as agricultural pests of maize and other crops like sugar beet, sunflower, wheat or potatoes. In maize, mainly the germinating seeds are attacked, but in other crops the roots of seedlings are damaged. The adult beetles do not damage crops and feed mainly on the flowers of weeds. They can be monitored with pheromone traps and the larvae are mainly controlled by seed dressing with insecticides. A female lays around 80 eggs in the top layer of the soil and the larvae emerge after about 2 weeks. In northern Italy, the larvae develop over almost 2 years and go through 12–13 instars, they pupate in spring and the adults emerge in the summer. In total, one generation is completed within 24 months. The development of the larvae lasts longer further north, where one life cycle extends over 3 or 4 years. Adult beetles of A. ustulatus are around 10 mm long. They live for 1 or 2 weeks in northern Italy and can be identified by the arrangement of hairs on the pronotum, by the morphology of the bases of the elytra and the antennae, as well as by their variable coloration with the elytra being either yellow-brown or completely dark brown to black. The larvae also have characteristic features which allow reliable identification. These are found on the tip of the abdomen and in the morphology of the mandible and the frontoclypeus.

== Distribution ==
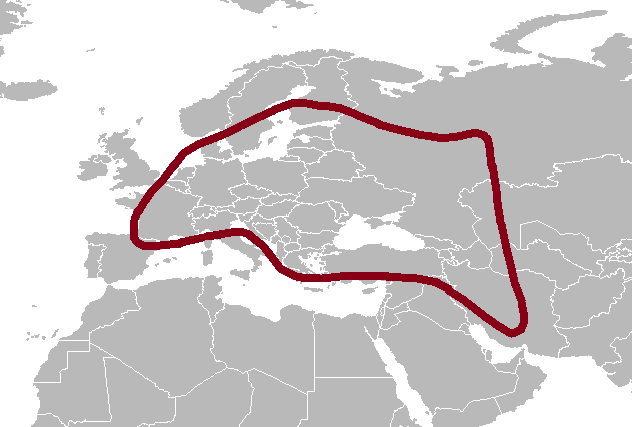
Distribution range of Agriotes ustulatus in Europe and the Near East

Agriotes ustulatus is most common in some parts of central Europe where it is often regarded as an agricultural pest. This region includes France, Switzerland, Austria, northern Italy, Germany, Hungary, Czech Republic, Poland and the Netherlands. It is also found in surrounding countries like Croatia, Romania, northern Spain, Denmark, Lithuania and Estonia. In some other parts of Europe and western Asia, it may be rare or even listed as endangered. For example, it has been only occasionally reported, from countries in the far north like southern Finland, from Turkey or Iran in the south and from western Russia in the east. Within a specific country and area the distribution of A. ustulatus is often highly clustered, apparently dependent on environmental factors like temperature, rainfall, soil conditions or crop and vegetation patterns.

== Description ==
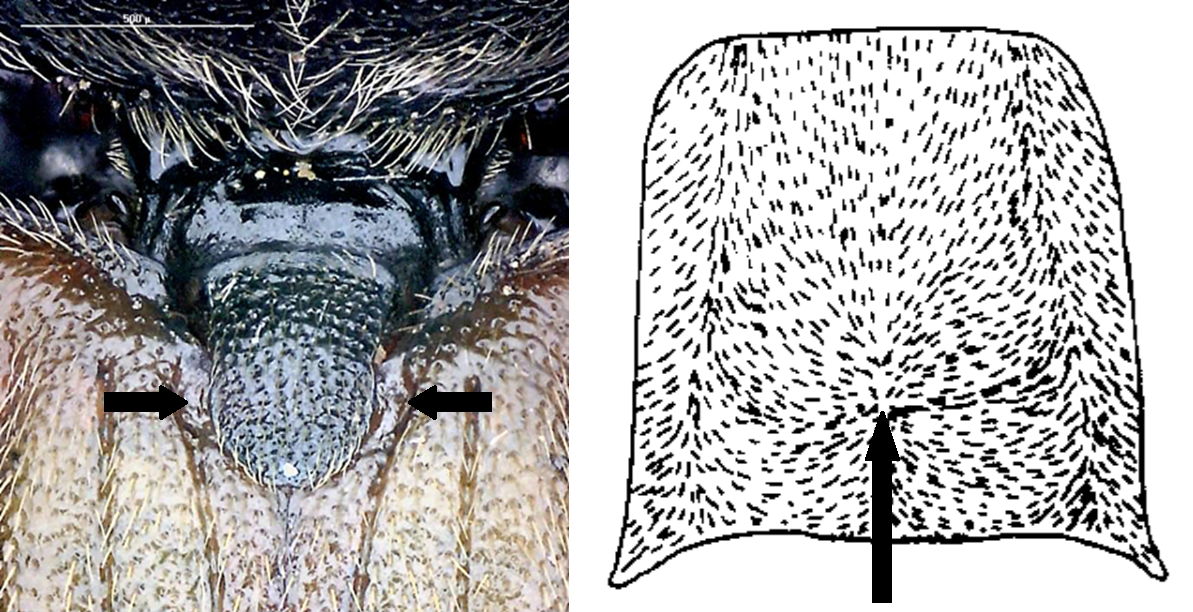
Agriotes ustulatus – left: scutellum at the base of the elytra showing pit-like depressions on the elytra next to the sides of the scutellum (arrows) – right: pronotum showing the arrangement of hairs which are directed at a point (arrow) in the lower middle of the pronotum.

The length of Agriotes ustulatus adults ranges from 7 to 13 mm, average 10 mm. Compared to other species of Agriotes found in Europe, they can be identified by a combination of different morphological features, mainly on the pronotum, the elytra and the antennae:

- The pronotum has a characteristic surface structure and the hairs on the lower middle part are arranged in a way that they point to one spot above the hind margin, see the arrow on the image at the far right.
- The base of the elytra near the scutellum have elongated pits, see arrows on the first image at the right.
- The 4th antennal segment is clearly longer than the 2nd segment.

The color of the elytra is variable and is typically either light brown with the tips often darker or completely dark brown to black. All A. ustulatus populations contain mixtures of these two color forms. However, intermediate colors also exist. Studies in two areas, one in northern Italy and the other in the Czech Republic, found the percentage of dark forms on average to be 40% and 32% respectively, independent of the gender of the beetles.

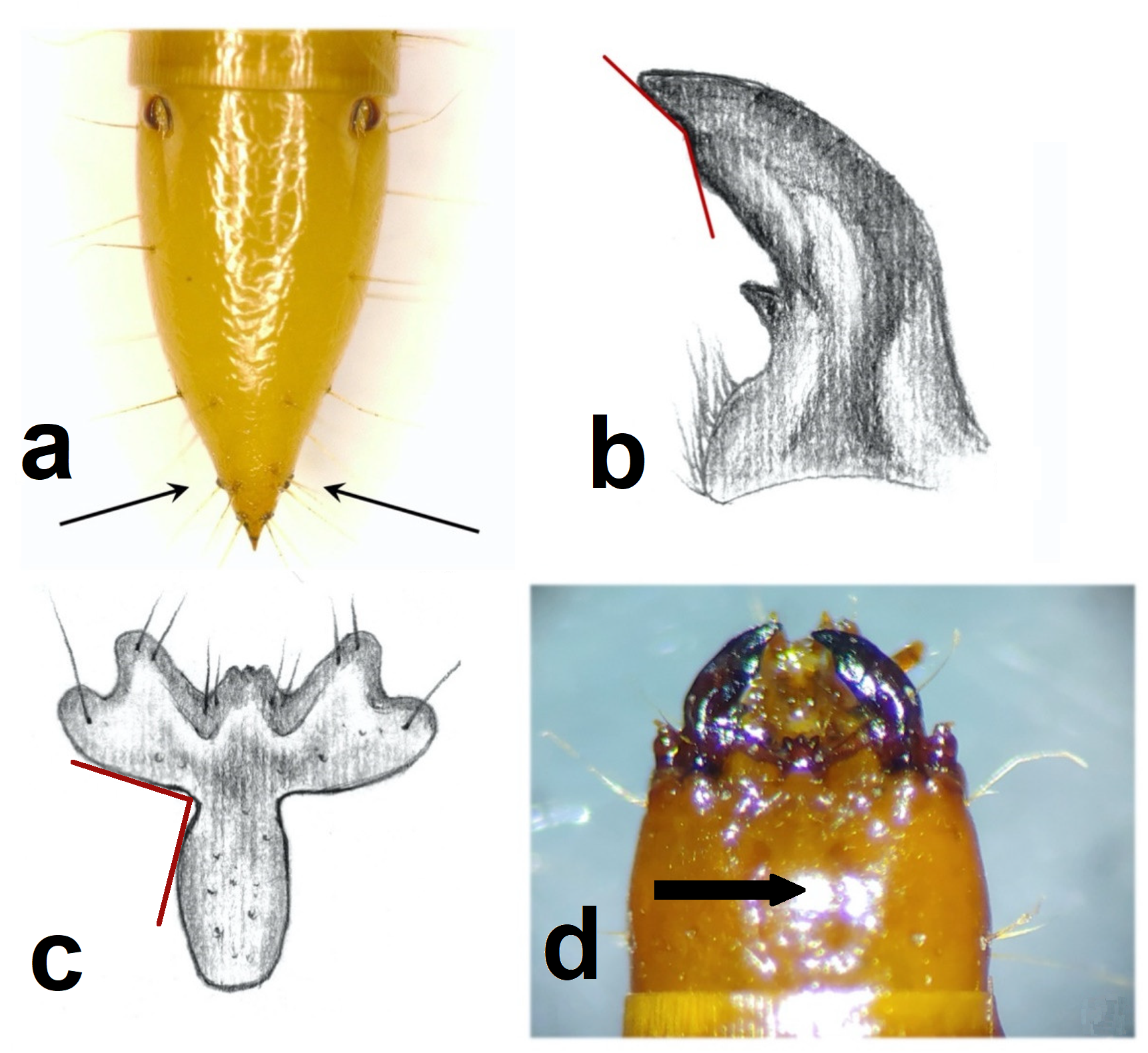
Diagnostic features of Agriotes ustulatus larvae: a) tip of abdomen with arrows pointing at dark elevated tubercles around setae, b) right mandible with marked angle clearly >90°, c) frontoclypeus with marked angle slightly larger than 90°, d) location of frontoclypeus (arrow) on head of larva.

Before applying pesticides to infestations of Agriotes larvae (wireworms) in Europe, it is required to determine whether the population exceeds the damage threshold which varies from species to species. Therefore, it is necessary to identify the species causing the infestation. Agriotes ustulatus larvae can be identified by a combination of morphological features which are illustrated at the left. The most reliable character is the presence of dark elevated tubercles around the base of the setae at the tip of the larval abdomen, the 9th abdominal segment (figure a). Other distinguishing features are the shape of the right mandible that usually forms a large angle (clearly more than 90°) between the tip and the subapical tooth (figure b). However, this angle is variable and is only 90° in about 15% of the larvae. Further, the shape of the frontoclypeus on the head is characteristic (figures c and d). It forms an angle as indicated on figure c that is slightly above 90° in 99.5% of the larvae, in contrast to other Agriotes species. Molecular identification of the larvae is also reliable.

== Biology ==
Agriotes ustulatus females lay their eggs into the top 10 cm of the soil during the summer, in total about 80 eggs per female. The larvae emerge after approximately 3 weeks and start feeding on germinating seeds and roots. They are polyphagous and can feed on grasses or crops like maize, sugar beet, sunflower, wheat or potatoes. In the case of maize, mainly the seeds are attacked, but in other plants the roots and the base of the plants are damaged. Young seedlings are preferred. However, the larvae are not feeding continuously and the periods of active feeding only amount to about 20% of the total larval life time. In northern Italy, there are 11 to 13 larval instars and the life cycle is completed in two years. However, in countries further north, the life cycle extends over 3 to 4 years and the larvae burrow deeper into the soil for overwintering.

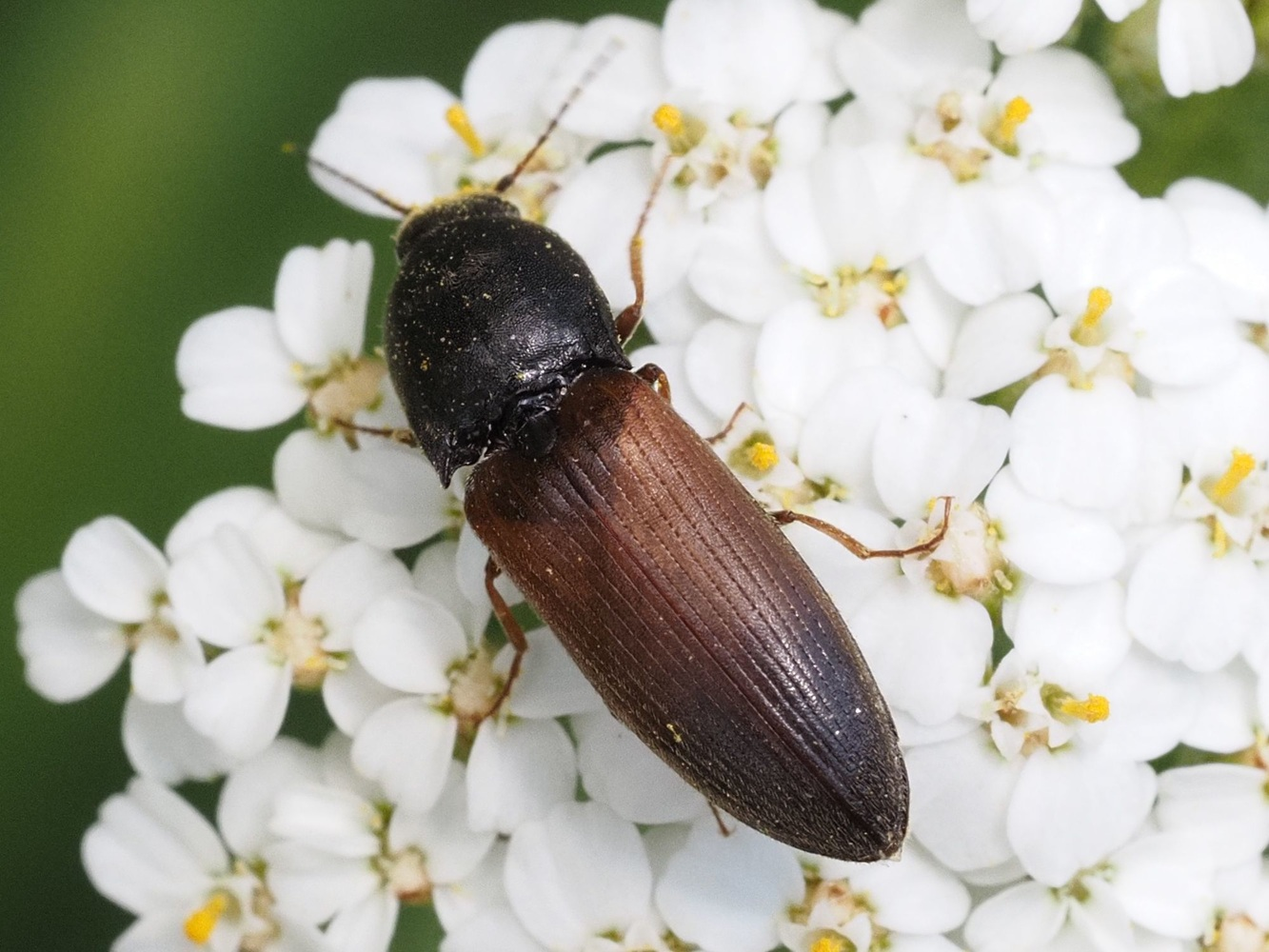
Agriotes ustulatus adult feeding on flowers.

The larvae pupate in spring, typically in the upper soil layers. The pupal stage lasts for about 2 weeks and the adults emerge and are mainly active during the summer. The adults are not harmful to crops and feed on weeds, often on the flowers of plants from the family Apiaceae. Usually, the life span of A. ustulatus adults is short, but they overwinter in some areas by digging into the soil.

== Pheromones and traps ==
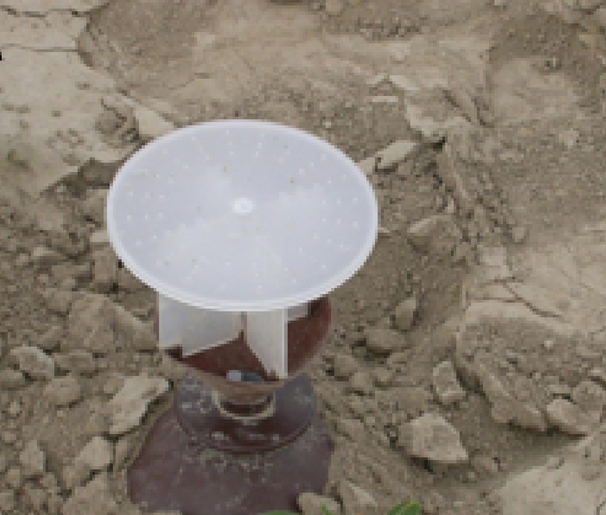
YATLORF sex pheromone trap for monitoring Agriotes species.

Agriotes ustulatus females produce the pheromone (E,E)-farnesyl acetate that attracts males and can be used for monitoring pest populations. The pheromone traps are installed at soil level. They are species-specific and have been used in several countries for monitoring, although they are only attractive over relatively short distances (< 50 m) and the lure lasts for only a few days in the field. The pheromone traps are used, for example, to determine whether pesticide treatments are justified because trap catches correlate with subsequent crop damage of wireworms in maize fields.

A lure for female A. ustulatus beetles has been also developed and consists of a mixture of the floral compounds (E)-anethol and (E)-cinnamaldehyde. If the above pheromone is added to the floral lure, the number of females caught increases dramatically and the traps catch males in addition to females, equivalent to pheromone traps.

Bait traps for catching Agriotes larvae in the soil have been also described. These consist of a plastic container, 10 cm wide, with holes at the bottom that contain moistened vermiculite and wheat plus maize seeds. The traps are placed into the soil about 5 cm below the surface and examined after 10 days. In contrast to the pheromone traps, these traps are not specific to certain wireworm species and the catches need to be sorted and identified.

== Impact and management ==
=== Crop damage ===
In Europe, the most detailed studies of crop damage by Agriotes species have been conducted in northern Italy and damage by Agriotes ustulatus larvae is most significant for maize, where they destroy mainly the germinating seeds. In maize fields, A. ustulatus is often the most common species, but in terms of damage potential, it ranks third after Agriotes brevis and A. sordidus, since it has a higher damage threshold. During a study of 93 maize fields in northern Italy, significant yield reduction due to A. ustulatus damage was found in only 3 fields.

Agriotes ustulatus is polyphagous like other Agriotes species and in other crops it feeds mainly on the roots and the neck of seedlings, which can lead to plant mortality. However, the damage varies widely from crop to crop. For example, lettuce plants can be completely destroyed by A. ustulatus, while there would be no plant loss for cabbage or capsicum under the same conditions. In Romania, wireworms cause considerable damage to sugar beet and Agriotes ustulatus is the dominant species in that crop.

=== IPM thresholds ===
Since 2014, the adoption of an Integrated Pest Management (IPM) approach is required for the use of pesticides in Europe. As part of this approach, economic thresholds need to be established for different pest species and crops. Pesticides are then only applied once the pest population has reached these thresholds. For Agriotes species, such thresholds have been only established for maize and the populations of larvae are monitored by using bait traps. For Agriotes ustulatus, the IPM threshold is 5 larvae per trap during 10 days of trapping. This threshold can also vary according to environmental conditions and is reliable for fields where a) no other food sources are available, b) the soil temperature is above 8°C and c) the humidity is near the field water capacity. Actually, in northern Italy, less than 5% of the area planted to maize has damaging populations of wireworms. A simpler way of predicting possible damage to maize by A. ustulatus is to use the catches in pheromone traps.

=== Pesticide use ===
Until the 1990s, the persistent organochlorine pesticides lindane and aldrin were commonly used for wireworm control in Europe, applied by broadcast applications. However, they were progressively withdrawn from the market as their negative effects on human health and the environment became apparent. They were replaced by other groups like neonicotinoids which were usually applied as seed dressing, for example for maize or sugar beet. However, neonicotinoids also have negative environmental effects, especially on beneficial insects like honey bees and other pollinators.

=== Alternative control ===
With the increasing restrictions on the use of soil insecticides, alternative methods for the control of wireworms are being developed and applied. In practice, monitoring the wireworm population in the soil with bait traps or the click beetle population with pheromone traps is the first step. If damaging levels of Agriotes species are detected in an area, then the planting of a low-risk crop like soybean should be considered for that area. In general, low-risk crop rotation helps to reduce pest populations, as do practices like timing tilling and irrigation in order to destroy eggs and young wireworm larvae in the top soil layer during critical times of the year. Promising results have been also obtained with alternative control agents. These include, for example, defatted seed meals as biofumigants, calcium cyanamide as a repellent fertilizer or biological control agents like entomopathogenic fungi (e.g. Metarhizium brunneum).

== Taxonomy ==
A large number of synonym names have been published for Agriotes ustulatus. In addition, several varieties or subspecies are often listed. The many names are apparently due to the variable coloration of A. ustulatus, its common occurrence across Europe, and the poorly studied taxonomy of the very large genus Agriotes. Apart from the basionym, Elater ustulatus Schaller 1783, four other synonym names are listed most often for A. ustulatus:

1. Elater blandus Germar 1824 - In his book "Coleopterum species novae aut minus cognitus" (new or little-known beetle species), Germar described Elater blandus from Halle, Germany as one of 32 Elater species. Unlike the description by Schaller, Germar's description does not include a comparison to previously described species.
2. Agriotes gilvellus Lacordaire 1835 - In his description of the insects from the vicinity of Paris, Lacordaire also did not compare Agriotes gilvellus with related species and did not mention the species ustulatus.
3. Agriotes confusus Bach 1854 - In his description of beetles from north and central Germany, Bach described Agriotes confusus as a new species, comparing it to Elater ustulus Schönherr, 1817 (another synonym of A. ustulatus) and Agriotes gilvellus, two names which he regarded as not valid and only as "Sammlungsnamen" (collection names). Elater ustulatus or Agriotes ustulatus is not mentioned in his description of 7 Agriotes species.
4. Agriotes nitidicollis Miller 1881 – Miller described Agriotes nitidicollis as a common species from Budua (= Budva in Montenegro). The main differences to Agriotes ustulatus were described as A. nitidicollis being slenderer, with a more finely pitted surface on the pronotum, and a dark coloration at the bases of the elytra.
