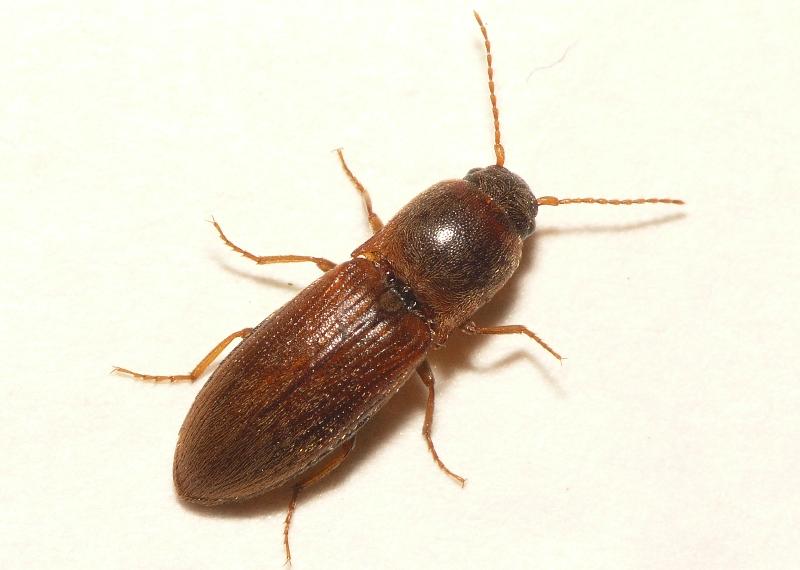
- Agriotes sputator

Scientific classification
- Kingdom: Animalia
- Phylum: Arthropoda
- Clade: Pancrustacea
- Class: Insecta
- Order: Coleoptera
- Suborder: Polyphaga
- Infraorder: Elateriformia
- Family: Elateridae
- Subfamily: Elaterinae
- Tribe: Agriotini
- Subtribe: Agriotina
- Genus: Agriotes; Eschscholtz 1829

Type species
- Agriotes sputator (Linnaeus 1758)

Subgenera
- Agriodrastus Reitter 1911; Agriotes Eschscholtz 1829; Tinecoides Gur'eva 1979; Tinecus Fleutieux 1940

Synonyms
- Subgenus Agriotes: Agriotus Severin 1949 (in error); Cataphagus Stephens 1830; Fructuarius Gistl 1848 (unjustified replacement name for Agriotus Eschs.); Hemirhypus Dillwyn 1829; Lepidotus Gistel 1834 (preoccupied by Lepidotus Asso, 1801); Pedetes Kirby 1837 (preoccupied by Pedetes Illiger, 1811); Subgenus Tinecus: Timecus Leseigneur, 1972 (in error)

= Agriotes =

Genus of beetles

Agriotes is a very large genus of beetles in the family of click beetles or Elateridae. More than 350 species have been described and are currently recognized as valid, see the list of Agriotes species. The natural habitat of many species is grassland. Breeding takes place in the soil, like in other groups of click beetles, where the larvae or wireworms feed on seeds and roots. The genus is widely distributed in Europe, Asia (including the Near East), northern Africa and the Americas. Compared to related genera of click beetles, species of Agriotes can be mainly recognized by structures on the pronotum and the head (see below). The larvae of common species, can be harmful to crops and damage cereals like maize, forage crops like alfalfa, or root crops like potatoes and sugar beet. Three Agriotes species are invasive and have spread to North America, where they also have become serious agricultural pests and are suppressing and displacing native species.

== Biology and ecology ==
Like many other click beetles, the species of the genus Agriotes breed in the soil and the larvae (wireworms) are elongated with a hardened cuticle. Details of their biology and ecology are mainly known for pest species. The general habitat of many species appears to be grassland. Further, Agriotes species are often common in higher altitudes, in areas of higher precipitation during the winter and in acidic, humus-rich soils.

For the more common and harmful Agriotes species, the food plants have been studied. The larvae are polyphagous and feed on seeds, roots and tubers, like those of grasses, cereals and other crops, while the adult beetles feed on the leaves of grasses. In addition, the larvae also feed on germinating seeds and on the stem of young seedlings.

Agriotes female beetles lay their eggs in batches in the soil, close to the surface. The eggs hatch after several weeks. The larvae develop slowly, usually involving more than 10 instars and the whole life cycle from egg to egg extends over several years.

== Distribution ==
Distribution ranges of the species in the genus Agriotes in Europe, Asia and Africa. The blue outline delimitates the distribution of all species and the brown outline that of Agriotes sputator, the type species of the genus.

Species of the genus Agriotes are widely distributed around the world and often live in mountainous areas. However, distribution records often mention the species under different genera like the basionyms. In Europe, the genus is found in most areas except for the most northern parts of Norway, Sweden, Finland and Russia. Actually, Agriotes sputator, the type species of the genus is also found in most parts of Europe.

In Africa, species of Agriotes like Agriotes sordidus are found in the North-West, in Morocco, Algeria, Tunisia and as far south as the Canary Islands. Further, there are some records from Egypt and Agriotes sikorae has been described from Madagascar, but with no records of Agriotes species from other parts of sub-Saharan Africa.

Some parts of Western Asia have a high diversity of Agriotes species and Turkey has probably the highest number of Agriotes species of any country. A checklist published in 2025 lists 92 Agriotes species from Turkey (of which 2 are currently not recognized as valid for this genus). Agriotes species are also common in countries neighbouring Turkey and in Central Asia, but the genus appears to be absent in Saudi Arabia and southern parts of Iraq, Iran and Afghanistan. In the remaining parts of Asia, there are few records from Siberia, but the genus is present in all parts of China, the Koreas and in central and southern parts of Japan. Further south, Agriotes species have been recorded in Myanmar, Thailand, Vietnam, Laos, Cambodia and mainland Malaysia (in some cases described under different genera). In addition, Agriotes australasiae has been described from Aru Islands, an isolated location in Indonesia, near New Guinea.

Distribution ranges of the species in the genus Agriotes in the Americas. The blue outline delimitates the distribution of the native species and the red outline that of 3 invasive pest species, Agriotes lineatus, A. obscurus and A. sputator.

In North America, Agriotes species have been described from Canada to Mexico, with the largest number of species reported from Mexico, especially from the southern states of Chiapas, Oaxaca and Vera Cruz. The genus is also common in southern parts of Canada and northern parts of the U.S. Further, it is present in most central parts of the U.S., but is rare or absent in many southern parts, except for California. For example, Agriotes imperfectus has been described by LeConte from southern California. The genus might also be present in other southern states of the U.S. like Arizona, Texas and Alabama. However, those records appear to be unconfirmed.

Agriotes species have been recorded in most Central American countries and in some Caribbean Islands. In South America, Agriotes species have been found in French Guiana, Uruguay, Argentina and central and southern parts of Chile (again, often reported under different genera).

== Description ==
Prothorax of Agriotes lineatus in side view, showing its shape and the course of the lateral ridge of the pronotum, marked in green on the right side (pronotum yellow and prosternum red).

The species of the genus Agriotes range in length from 3 and 13 mm. They are rarely larger than 13 mm. The species can be recognized by a combination of different characters. Often, the shape of the pronotum, especially the ridges on the sides of the pronotum are cited as the most important feature. Other characteristic features involve the head, the antennae, the elytra and the claws.

The pronotum is longer than wide, sometimes only slightly. The lateral ridges are curved in an S-like manner with the part near the head (left side in the images at the right) bending into the ventral side of the pronotum. Therefore, from above the lateral ridges are only visible at the rear end of the pronotum and are hidden together with the sternum in the middle and in the front. In some species the lateral ridges are interrupted in the middle.

Head of Agriotes obscurus in frontal view.

On the head, the mouthparts are pointing downwards (hypognathous). The ridges above the base of the antennae are poorly developed, especially towards the mouthparts, and often do not reach the clypeus, in contrast to the closely related genus Ectinus.

The larval stages also have characteristic morphological features which can be used for identifying many species. Further, identification by molecular methods is possible.

== Agricultural pests ==
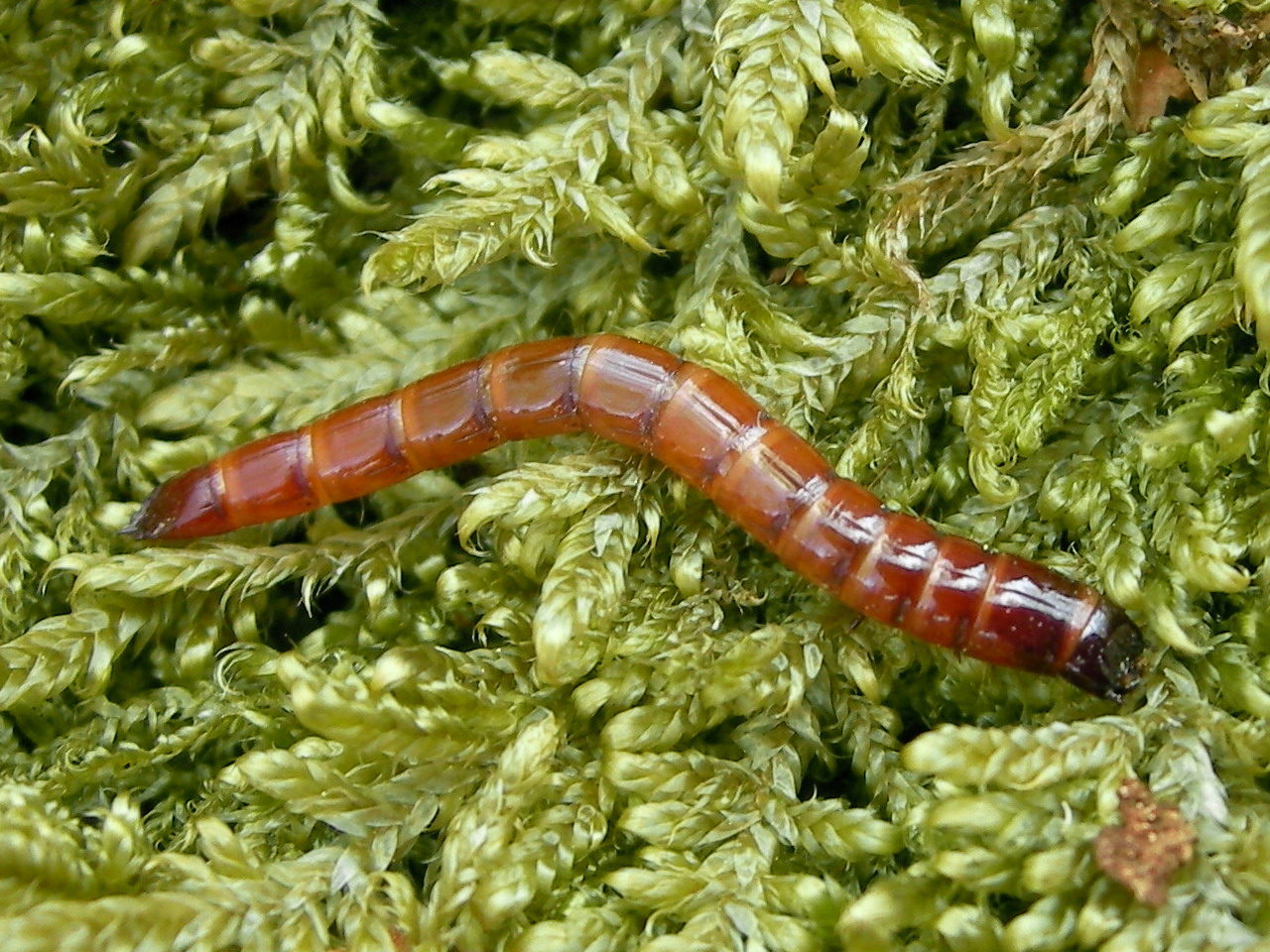
Larva of Agriotes lineatus placed on a patch of moss.

Three Agriotes species, Agriotes lineatus, A. obscurus and A. sputator have been accidentally introduced into North America and have become invasive. The larval stages of these and of several other species in Europe are serious agricultural pests, damaging cereals and other field crops. The larvae attack the seeds, roots, seedlings, stems and tubers, reducing the growth of the crops and in severe cases causing plant death. The main crops affected are maize, other cereals, alfalfa and root crops like sugar beet and potatoes.

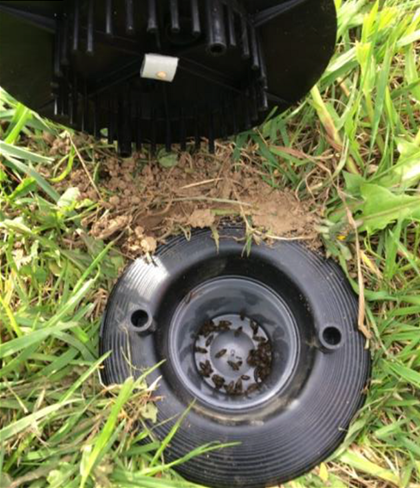
Vernon Pitfall Trap for catching Agriotes beetles. The lid of the trap has been opened and shows granules treated with the pheromone lure taped to the underside of the lid.

Pest species can be monitored using pheromone traps, which target flying beetles, or using pitfall traps, which target beetles walking on the ground. Agriotes females often produce a mixture of pheromones and these mixtures are typically species specific and can be used only for one species. The pitfall traps can be made more attractive by combining them with a pheromone lure.

In the past, farmers have relied on persistent organochlorine pesticides like lindane and aldrin for managing Agriotes pest species. However, due to their harmful effects on the environment, alternatives have been and are still being developed. So far, the most promising method is to switch to an alternative, less attractive crop if damaging levels of wireworms are detected. Other methods include using less sensitive crops and timing tilling and irrigation in order to destroy eggs and young wireworm larvae in the top soil layer by desiccation. Further, mating disruption with pheromones and biological control methods like the use of fungal pathogens have been studied.

In Europe, maize is the crop most often attacked by Agriotes species, but the damage rarely reaches significant levels and an Integrated Pest Management (IPM) approach has been advocated. This means pest populations are monitored and management is only initiated once a threshold level has been reached.

== Taxonomy and species ==
The click beetle genus Agriotes has been named and described repeatedly, probably due to Agriotes species being rather common in Europe and in North America. Initially, the genus was named twice in 1829 when Eschscholtz first named the genus Agriotes and a few months later it was named again by Dillwyn as Hemirhypus. The following year, it was named and described in detail once more by Stephens as Cataphagus. Several more descriptions followed in the coming years, see the taxobox above.

The name Agriotes originates from the Greek word agrios (ἄγριος) which means wild and agriotes has been translated as wilderness. The genus Agriotes is very large and more than 350 species are currently accepted as valid (status 2026), see the complete list of Agriotes species. The following short list includes the most common species and the most serious agricultural pests:

- Agriotes brevis Candèze, 1863
- Agriotes lineatus (Linnaeus, 1767)
- Agriotes litigiosus (Rossi, 1792)
- Agriotes mancus (Say, 1823)
- Agriotes obscurus (Linnaeus, 1758)
- Agriotes pallidulus (Illiger, 1807)
- Agriotes proximus Schwarz, 1891
- Agriotes rufipalpis (Brulle, 1832)
- Agriotes sordidus (Illiger, 1807)
- Agriotes sputator (Linnaeus, 1758)
- Agriotes ustulatus (Schaller 1783)

Identification of the individual species relies mainly on the size, colour, the presence of hairs on different body parts as well as the detailed structures of the elytra, pronotum and antennae.
