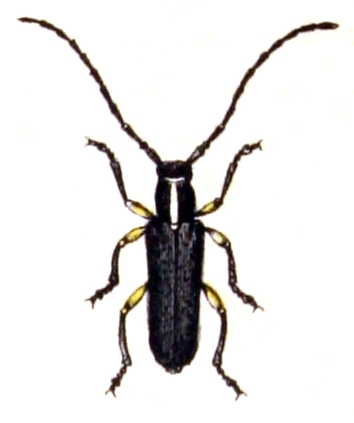

Scientific classification
- Kingdom: Animalia
- Phylum: Arthropoda
- Clade: Pancrustacea
- Class: Insecta
- Order: Coleoptera
- Suborder: Polyphaga
- Infraorder: Cucujiformia
- Family: Cerambycidae
- Genus: Phytoecia
- Species: P. icterica

Binomial name
- Phytoecia icterica (Schaller, 1783)

Synonyms
- Phytoecia ephippium (Fabricius) Mulsant, 1862; Saperda icterica Schaller, 1783; Saperda ephippium Fabricius, 1792; Oberea ragusana Küster, 1844

= Phytoecia icterica =

Species of beetle

Phytoecia icterica is a species of beetle in the family Cerambycidae. It was described by Schaller in 1783, originally under the genus Saperda. It has a wide distribution between Europe and the Middle East. It feeds on Daucus carota sativus, Petroselinum crispum, Pastinaca sativa sativa, Pastinaca sativa, Conium maculatum, and Pimpinella saxifraga.

== Subspecies ==
- Phytoecia icterica icterica (Schaller, 1783)
- Phytoecia icterica annulipes Mulsant, 1863
