= Biosolarization =

Soil fumigation alternative process

Biosolarization is an alternative technology to soil fumigation used in agriculture. It is closely related to biofumigation and soil solarization, or the use of solar power to control nematodes, bacteria, fungi and other pests that damage crops.

In solarization, the soil is mulched and covered with a tarp to trap solar radiation and heat the soil to a temperature that kills pests. Biosolarization adds the use of organic amendments or compost to the soil before it is covered with plastic, which speeds up the solarization process by decreasing the soil treatment time through increased microbial activity.

Research conducted in Spain on the use of biosolarization in strawberry fruit production has shown it to be a sustainable and cost effective option.

The practice of biosolarization is being used among small agricultural operations in California.

Biosolarization is a growing practice in response to the need for methods for organic soil solarization. The option for more widespread use of biosolarization is being studied by researchers at the Western Center for Agricultural Health and Safety at the University of California, Davis in order to validate the effectiveness of biosolarization in commercial agriculture in California, where it has the potential to greatly reduce the use of conventional fumigants. Biosolarization can also use as organic waste management practice. Recent studies showed the potential of food industrial residues as soil amendments that can improve the efficiency of biosolarization.

== See also ==
- Biofumigation
