= Philipp Wilhelm Wirtgen =

German botanist and educator (1806–1870)

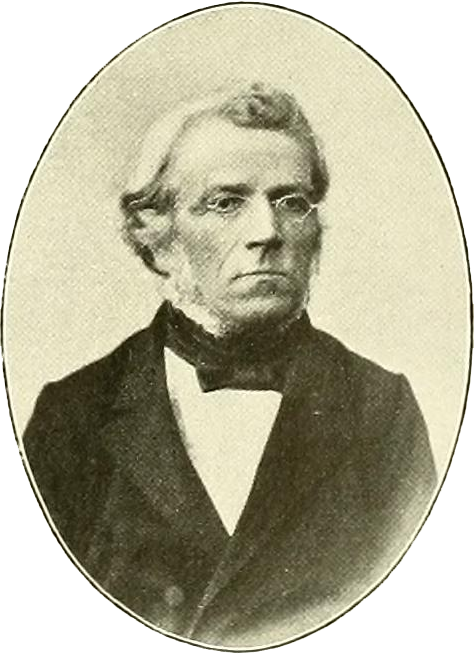
Philipp Wilhelm Wirtgen (1866)

Philipp Wilhelm Wirtgen (4 December 1806 – 7 September 1870) was a German botanist and teacher born in Neuwied, Germany. He was the father of botanist Ferdinand Paul Wirtgen (1848–1924).

== Teaching ==
He was a school teacher in Remagen, Winningen and beginning in 1831, at Koblenz, where from 1835 to 1870, he served as an instructor at the Evangelischen Höheren Stadtschule. With botanist Theodor Friedrich Ludwig Nees von Esenbeck (1787-1837), he was founder of the Botanischer Verein am Mittel- und Niederrhein (Botanical Association of the Middle and Lower Rhine).

== Research and publications ==
Wirtgen specialized in the study of Rhineland flora, and his work largely dealt with phytogeography, taxonomy and floristics within the field of botany. Among his numerous publications was an 1857 book involving flora native to Rhine Province called "Flora der preußischen Rheinprovinz und der zunächst angränzenden Gegenden", and a treatise titled "Neuwied und seine Umgebung" (Neuwied and its Environment). Other noted works by Wirtgen include:

- Flora des Regierungsbezirks Coblenz, 1841 – Flora of the Koblenz district.
- Die cryptogamischen Gefässpflanzen der preussischen Rheinlande, 1847 – Cryptogamic vascular plants of the Prussian Rhineland.
- Beiträge zur rheinischen Flora, 1869 – Contribution to Rhenish flora.

He published several exsiccatae, the first starting around 1842 with Michael Bach and among others the series Herbarium plantarum criticarum, selectarum, hybridarumque florae Rhenanae.

== Legacy ==
The plant genus Wirtgenia (family Asteraceae) was named in his honor by Carl Heinrich "Bipontinus" Schultz (1842).
