= Ferdinand Paul Wirtgen =

German pharmacist and botanist (1848–1924)

Ferdinand Paul Wirtgen (7 January 1848 in Koblenz – 26 January 1924 in Bonn) was a German pharmacist and botanist. He was the son of botanist Philipp Wilhelm Wirtgen (1806–1870).

As a young man, he trained as a pharmacist in St. Johann an der Saar, followed by service in an army garrison hospital at Koblenz (1870–71). He then studied pharmacy in Bonn, and later spent two years as a pharmacist in the town of Ettenheim. In 1875, he returned to St. Johann, where he eventually took ownership of a pharmacy. From 1889 onward, he lived in Bonn, where focused his energies towards botanical research. He issued the exsiccata series Pteridophyta exsiccata (1897–1915). In 1920 he became an honorary professor at the University of Bonn.

As a botanist, he took excursions to Borkum, the Harz Mountains, the Black Forest, the Vosges and to Switzerland. His work consisted of studies in the fields of floristics, phytogeography and plant systematics, of which he conducted systematic investigations of ferns and also plants from the genera Verbascum, Rubus, Salix, Rumex, Mentha, Rosa, Carex and Epilobium. During his career, he amassed a herbarium of over 210,000 specimens.

== Principal writings ==
- Das Seltenerwerden und Verschwinden einzelner Pflanzenarten der Rheinischen Flora, 1905.
- Die botanischen Sammlungen des Naturhistorischen Vereins der preussischen Rheinlande und Westfalens, 1907
- Zur Flora des Vereinsgebietes, 1908.
