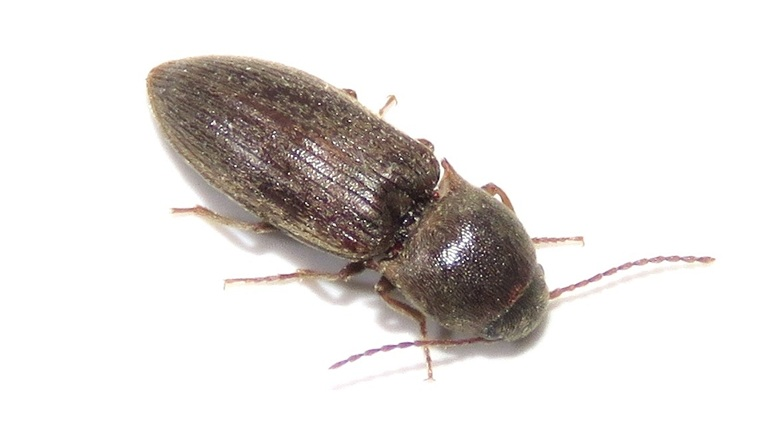

Scientific classification
- Kingdom: Animalia
- Phylum: Arthropoda
- Class: Insecta
- Order: Coleoptera
- Suborder: Polyphaga
- Infraorder: Elateriformia
- Family: Elateridae
- Genus: Agriotes
- Species: A. mancus

Binomial name
- Agriotes mancus (Say 1823)

Synonyms
- Elater mancus Say 1823

= Agriotes mancus =

Species of beetle in North America

Agriotes mancus, commonly known as the wheat wireworm, is a species of click beetle in the family Elateridae. It is native to north-eastern and north-central North America, with most records from eastern Canada (e.g. Quebec and Ontario) and the north-eastern US (e.g. New York, Pennsylvania, Maine). In the West its distribution extends up to the US states of Missouri and Minnesota as well as to the Canadian province of Manitoba. The larvae (wireworms) are a significant agricultural pest, attacking the roots, tubers and seeds of cereals, potatoes and other crops. For example, large-scale outbreaks have been reported from maize (corn) and potatoes, especially if these crops are planted after or close to grassland, the natural habitat of this insect. Such outbreaks can cause complete crop failures, for example in maize by the wireworms feeding on the seeds and the roots of the seedlings. However, in north-eastern North America, the economic importance of A. mancus appears to have declined in the 20th century in some areas, possibly due to competition with the introduced species Agriotes sputator. The adult beetles are between 6.5 and 8.5 mm (0.26 and 0.33 in) long with a brown coloration, while the larvae grow to a length of up to 22 mm (0.87 in). Egg laying occurs in June and July and the larval stages develop over a period of 3 to 5 years. The larvae pupate in August, but the adult beetles do not emerge from the soil until the coming spring.

== Distribution ==
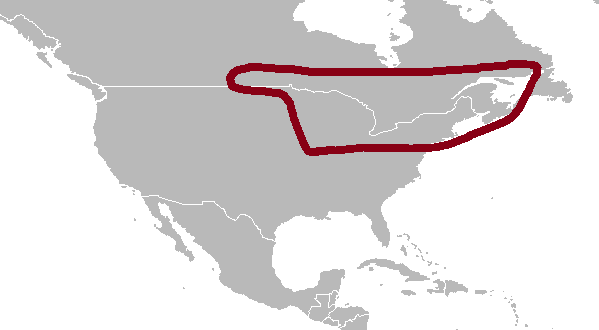
Distribution range of Agriotes mancus in north-eastern and north-central North America

Agriotes mancus was originally described from Missouri (as Elater mancus) which appears to be near the south-western limits of its distribution range. However, most records are from north-eastern North America, in the north up to the Canadian provinces of Labrador and Nova Scotia and extending in the south down to the U.S. states of Rhode Island, New York and Pennsylvania. Further to the west, the distribution of A. mancus extends to Quebec, Ontario, Manitoba and south-eastern Saskatchewan in Canada, and to Ohio, Indiana, Illinois, Missouri and Minnesota in the U.S.

It has been suggested that the populations of Agriotes mancus might have been displaced by the invasive and related species Agriotes sputator in parts of eastern North America. Published pest reports of A. mancus seem to support this hypothesis. In the first half of the 20th century, A. mancus has been repeatedly described as one of the most common wireworms of the northeastern and middle western parts of North America. However, there are no similar more recent reports. Two recent wireworm surveys in Ontario, eastern Canada found A. mancus to represent 4% and 10% of the wireworms sampled, while nearly half or more than half were Limonius agonus.

== Description ==
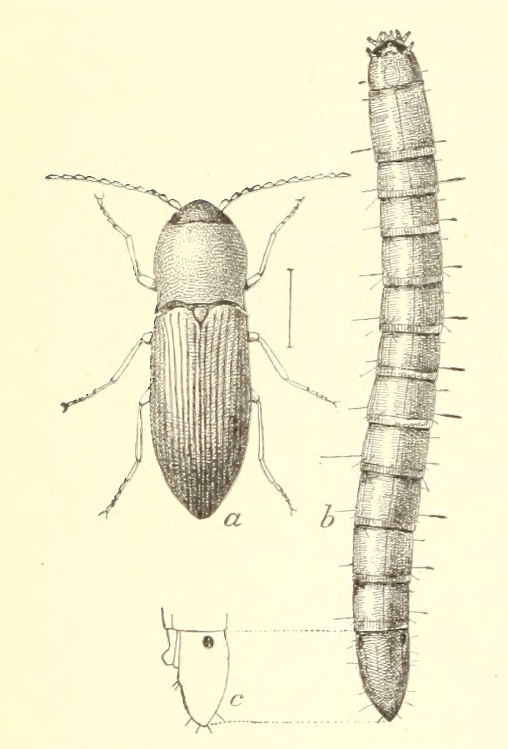
Drawings of adult beetle (a) and larva (b) of Agriotes mancus, dorsal views, c = side view of 9th segment of larva.

Agriotes mancus adult beetles are of small to medium size compared with other species of Agriotes. Their length ranges from 6.5 to 8.5 mm (0.26 to 0.33 in). The color is brown to dark brown, sometimes reddish brown. Legs and antennae are often lighter brown. The cuticle is punctured and covered with short, gold colored hairs. The pronotum is slightly wider than long.

The distinguishing features of the larvae (wireworms) of Agriotes mancus are important during surveys and for crop protection. When fully grown, the larvae reach a length of about 20 to 25 mm (0.75 to 1 in). They are straw colored and the caudal margins of the segments are slightly darker, giving them a ringed appearance. The last (ninth) abdominal segment has a pointed end and bears on the sides near its base two characteristic black, eyelike spots or pits that are not spiracles.

== Biology and ecology ==
The larvae (wireworms) of Agriotes mancus are polyphagous, feeding on the seeds and roots of various grasses and cereals, on the tubers of potatoes or carrots, as well as on the roots and stem base of various other crops like cucumbers, turnips, cabbage or soybean. The natural habitat of A. mancus is grassland, where the adult beetles may feed on the grass blades. Serious outbreaks have been reported when grasslands are converted to crop fields. Habitats with moist conditions and clay, silt or clay loam soils are preferred. Larvae might migrate into deeper layers if the soil becomes too dry or the temperature too low during the winter.

The adult beetles emerge from the soil in spring and start egg-laying in May and June. The young larvae emerge from the eggs after 3 to 4 weeks and start feeding. They develop over a period of 3 to 5 years, depending on the environmental conditions. The larvae hibernate during the winter and finally pupate in August or September. The pupal stage last 2 to 3 weeks, but the young adults do not leave the soil until the following spring. Therefore, the complete life cycle from egg to egg extends over 4 to 6 years.

== Impact and management ==
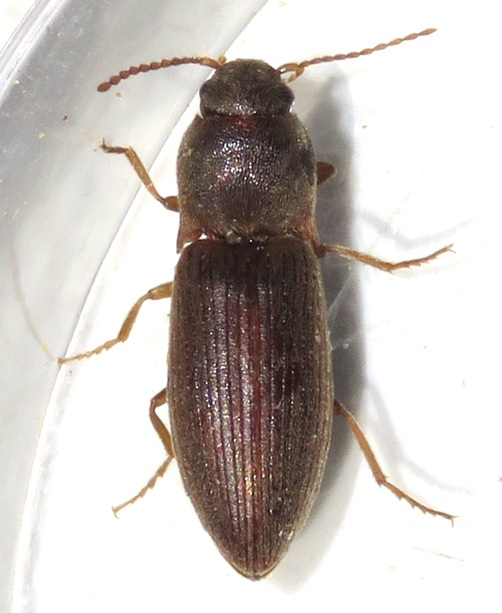
Adult beetle of Agriotes mancus from Ontario, Canada

Agriotes mancus is the only native species of Agriotes in North America that is regarded as an agricultural pest. Severe outbreaks of A. mancus have been described during the first half of the 20th century, often resulting in complete crop failure. The crops most often affected were potatoes as well as cereals like maize (corn) or wheat. In potatoes, the damage to the tubers is most destructive, but stems and stolons are also attacked. On the tubers, the wireworms cause scars and holes on the surface and also tunnel deep into the tubers.

For monitoring Agriotes mancus, Vernon pitfall traps can be used, baited with a 1:1 mixture of geranyl butanoate and geranyl hexanoate, 40 mg each per trap. Both compounds are emitted by female beetles and the mixture attracts large numbers of males. Among the possible management options to prevent crop damage by A. mancus, crop rotation has been most often recommended as well as avoiding planting a susceptible crop like potatoes in fields previously occupied by grasslands. It has been also suggested to plough a grassland immediately after the hay harvest in case maize (corn) is planned to be planted in that field during the coming year.

There are also reports that some crops (e.g. clover buckwheat or peas) are more resistant than others to attacks by A. mancus. Further, the planting date seems to affect the level of damage. For example, it has been suggested to plant potatoes as late as is economically feasible. Other recommendations for managing A. mancus are draining the soil and applying fertilizers to strengthen the plants so that they can withstand better the wireworm injuries.
