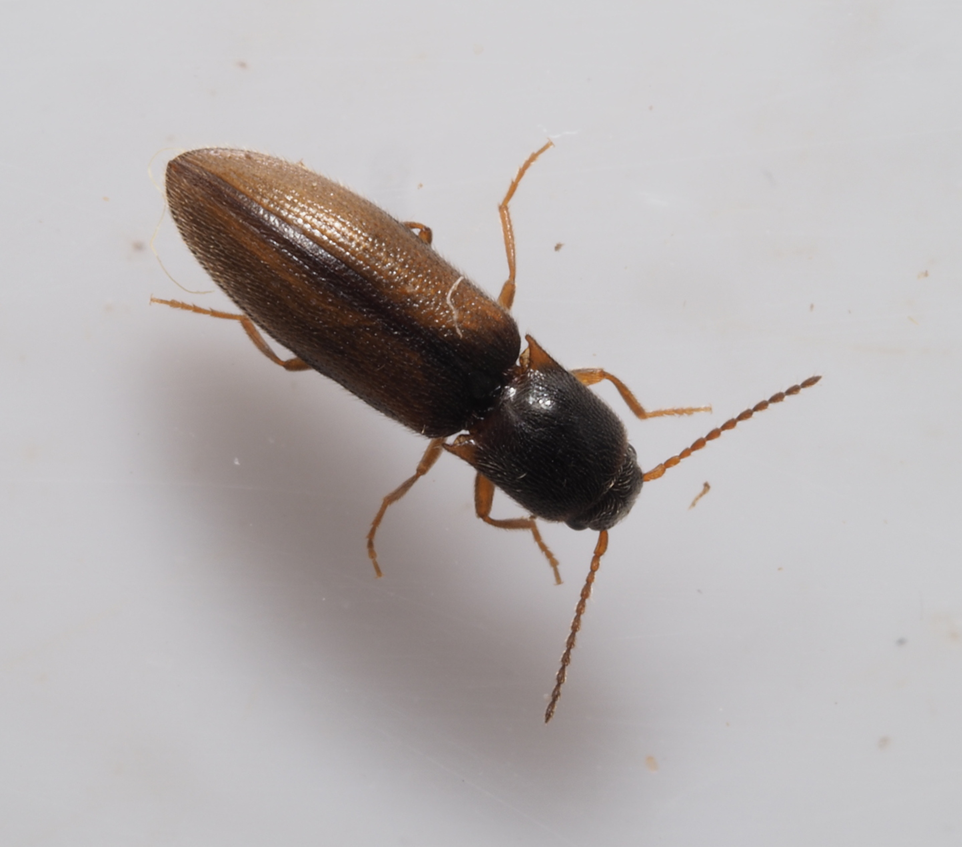

Scientific classification
- Kingdom: Animalia
- Phylum: Arthropoda
- Class: Insecta
- Order: Coleoptera
- Suborder: Polyphaga
- Infraorder: Elateriformia
- Family: Elateridae
- Genus: Agriotes
- Species: A. pallidulus

Binomial name
- Agriotes pallidulus (Illiger 1807)

Synonyms
- Elater pallidulus Illiger 1807; Elater umbrinus Germar 1824; Agriotes rufulus Lacordaire 1835

= Agriotes pallidulus =

Species of beetle

Agriotes pallidulus is a species of beetle in the family Elateridae and the genus Agriotes, found mainly in western and central Europe, occasionally also in eastern Europe. It is common in some countries, but is not regarded as an agricultural pest like some other species of Agriotes. A. pallidulus is one of the smallest members of Agriotes with the length of adult beetles ranging from 3½ to 6 mm. The color is brown to dark brown and the antennae, legs and elytra are usually lighter.

== Taxonomy ==
In the original description of Elater pallidulus, the basionym of Agriotes pallidulus, Illiger mentions that it is similar to Elater pusillus, but slightly larger and wider; also that it is similar to Elater limbatus (now Adrastus limbatus), but with a shorter and hairy pronotum; as well as to Elater striatus (now Agriotes lineatus) and Elater sputator (now Agriotes sputator) which are similarly build, but show differences in the hind margin of the pronotum.

Two additional species are now regarded as synonyms of Agriotes pallidulus. Firstly, in 1824, Germar described Elater umbrinus as a common species from "Halae" (Halle, Germany) with the definition "thorace oblongo, antice tumidulo, piceus, griseo pubescens, antennis pedibusque rufis" [thorax elongated, front part broad, black, with greyish hairs, antennae and legs reddish]. He did not compare it with other species of click beetles. Secondly, in 1835, Lacordaire described Agriotes rufulus, as a rare species from the vicinity of Paris (France), noting that in shape it has some similarities to Agriotes sputator and a color of reddish yellow, slightly darker on the head and the abdomen, with short, greyish hairs. Apart from these three descriptions, two varieties of Agriotes pallidulus have been introduced: Agriotes pallidulus ab. picipennis Bach 1896 and Agriotes pallidulus var. gabilloti Pic 1910.

== Distribution ==
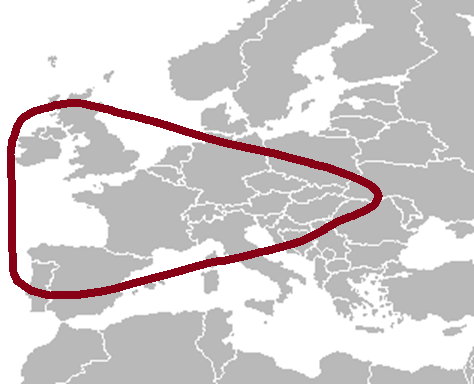
Distribution range of Agriotes pallidulus in Europe

Agriotes pallidulus was first described (as Elater pallidulus) by Johann Karl Wilhelm Illiger in his book on the beetles of Portugal, from where he obtained only one specimen (from northern Portugal). However, Illiger also mentioned that this species is not uncommon in Germany. It has been further reported from other parts of Europe, especially from central, western and north-western parts like the U.K., France, Germany, Belgium, the Netherlands and Switzerland. Various other records are from Austria, the Czech Republic, Hungary, Ireland, Italy, Luxemburg, Poland, northern Romania, Slovakia, Spain and parts of western Ukraine. Records from other European countries appear to be doubtful. While A. pallidulus is widespread and common in Britain, it has been reported to be rare in Ireland. Several reports from eastern Europe mention that it is also rare in that region, e.g. in Austria, Hungaria and the Czech Republic.

== Description ==
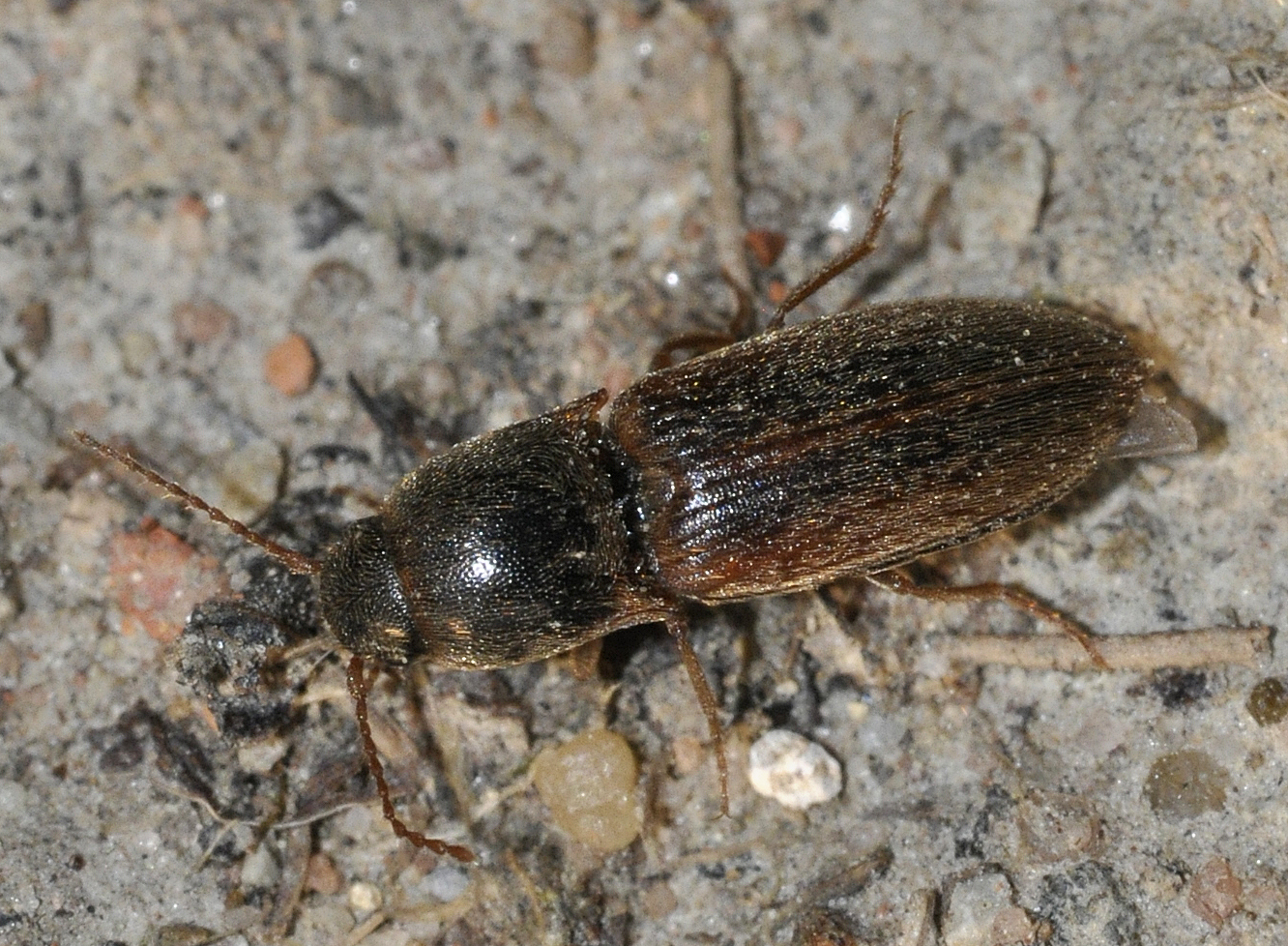
Agriotes pallidulus adult from central Germany

The length of the adult beetles of Agriotes pallidulus ranges from 3½ to 6 mm and is usually between 4 and 5 mm. This makes it the smallest species of Agriotes in Europe. Other European species are longer than 6½ mm. The adults have an elongated shape with a punctured cuticle and short greyish hairs. The pronotum is shiny and about as wide as long. The elytra have strongly punctured longitudinal grooves. The coloration is variable from dark brown to reddish-orange brown. The legs and antennae are lighter brown, sometimes yellowish. The sides of the elytra are also often lighter brown, but may be dark near the middle where they meet. Molecular identification is possible and the partial sequence of the cytochrome oxidase subunit 1 of A. pallidulus from Germany has been published.

== Biology and ecology ==
There is little information available on the biology and ecology of Agriotes pallidulus. Grasslands and forests are cited as habitat, where the larvae feed on the roots. The life cycle of A. pallidulus seems to be rather short compared to other Agriotes species. The larvae overwinter only once and pupate in the following spring.
