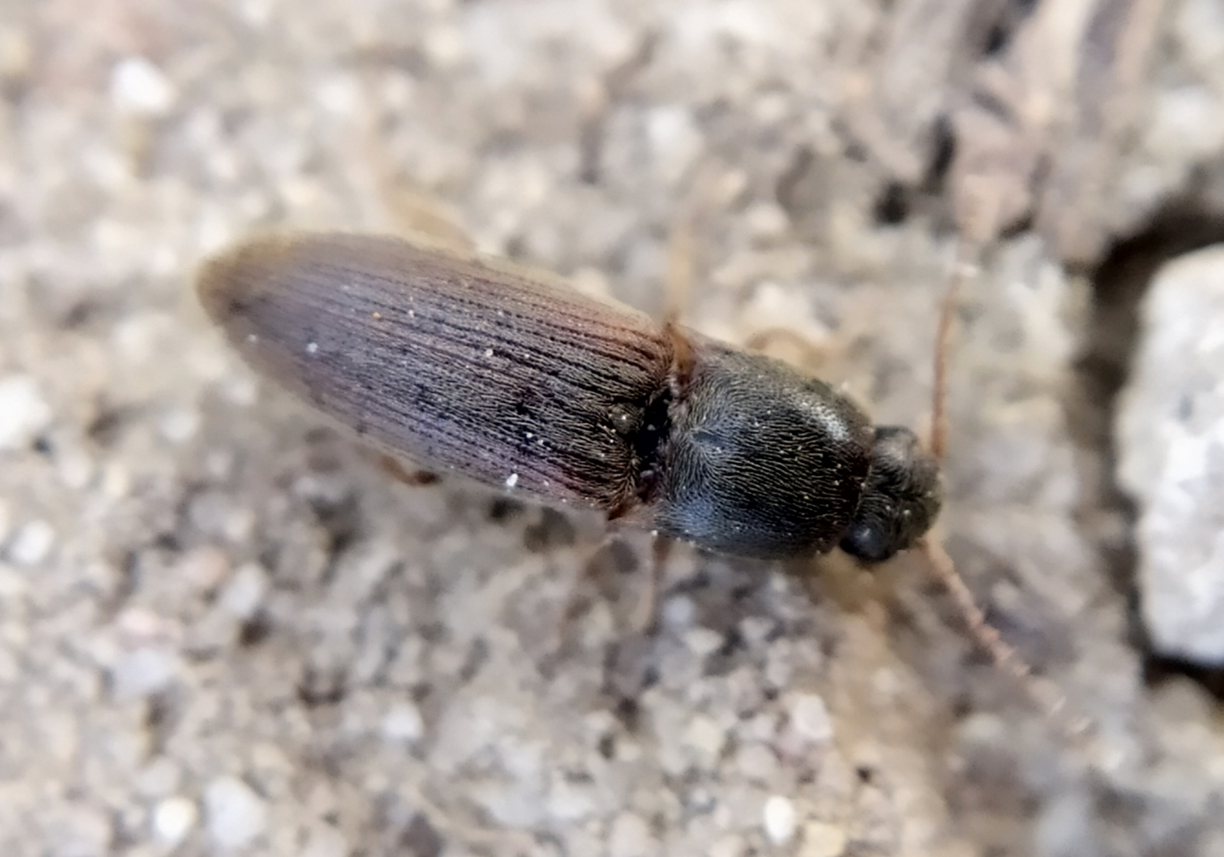

Scientific classification
- Kingdom: Animalia
- Phylum: Arthropoda
- Class: Insecta
- Order: Coleoptera
- Suborder: Polyphaga
- Infraorder: Elateriformia
- Family: Elateridae
- Genus: Agriotes
- Species: A. brevis

Binomial name
- Agriotes brevis Candèze 1863

= Agriotes brevis =

Species of beetle

Agriotes brevis is a species of click beetle, family Elateridae, found in central and southern Europe as well as in parts of western Asia. It is most common in south-eastern France, northern Italy, Austria, Croatia and Hungary, where the larvae (wireworms) often are a serious pest of maize and some other crops like cereals or alfalfa. The larvae feed mainly on the roots and the lower stems of the seedlings and can cause plant mortality. The pest populations can be monitored with the use of pheromone traps or with traps in the soil baiting larvae. Populations which exceed the economic threshold can be controlled by crop rotation and by timing tillage as well as irrigation in a way so that the eggs and young larvae are desiccated in the top layer of the soil. These measures are preferable compared to using a seed dressing with neonicotinoid insecticides which are highly toxic to pollinators like honey bees. The adult beetles of A. brevis have a length of 7½ to 9 mm. They are separated from other species in the genus Agriotes by their coloration as well as the shape, surface structure and the arrangement of hairs on the pronotum. The pronotum is slightly wider than long with moderately rounded sides. Head and pronotum are dark brown, the elytra and legs are reddish brown to dark brown. In Europe, the most similar species is Agriotes sputator. The larvae of A. brevis also have characteristic features which allow reliable identification. These are found on the tip of the abdomen and in the morphology of the mandible and the frontoclypeus.

== Distribution ==
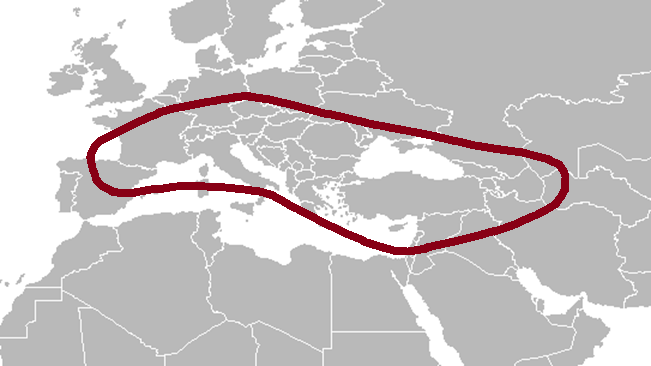
Distribution range of Agriotes brevis in Europe and western Asia

Agriotes brevis was originally described from southern France ("France méridionale") where it is frequently found in the south-east between Marseille, Nice and Sisteron. It is also common in northern Italy, Croatia, Austria and Hungary. In and around Hungary, it is especially common in the Pannonian Basin. The total distribution of A. brevis extends from parts of Spain in the south-west to central Germany and southern Poland in the north, to parts of Ukraine and Russia in the east, as well as to Greece, Turkey, and parts of Iran and Turkmenistan in the south-east. During a survey in Austria, the wireworms of A. brevis were mainly found in the north-eastern part of the country, in areas with a warmer, drier climate and in alkaline soils.

== Description ==
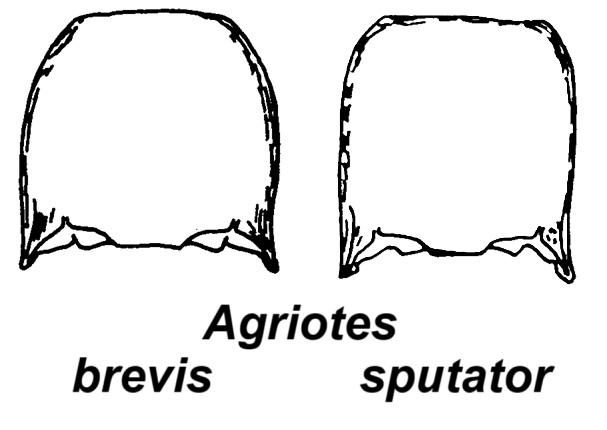
Shape of the pronotum of Agriotes brevis (left) and Agriotes sputator (right)

Compared to other species in the genus Agriotes, the adult beetles of Agriotes brevis are of medium size with a length of 7½ to 9 mm. The main distinguishing characters are on the prothorax, the elytra and the antennae:

- Pronotum usually slightly wider than long or as wide as long, but not longer than wide, with moderately rounded sides. The hairs near the hind margin are directed transversely towards the middle of the pronotum.
- Middle of prosternum (the ventral plate of the prothorax) glossy, finely and more densely pitted compared to the pronotum.
- 2nd antennal segment almost as long as the 4th.
- The coloration of the head and the pronotum is dark brown, the anterior margin of the pronotum is not lighter. The elytra and legs are reddish brown to dark brown. Occasionally, most parts or all of the elytra are black.

Agriotes brevis is most similar to Agriotes sputator. Both species can be separated by the shape of the pronotum which is more elongated and less rounded at the sides in A. sputator, see illustration on the right. Further, in A. sputator the anterior margin and the posterior lateral corners of the pronotum are reddish.

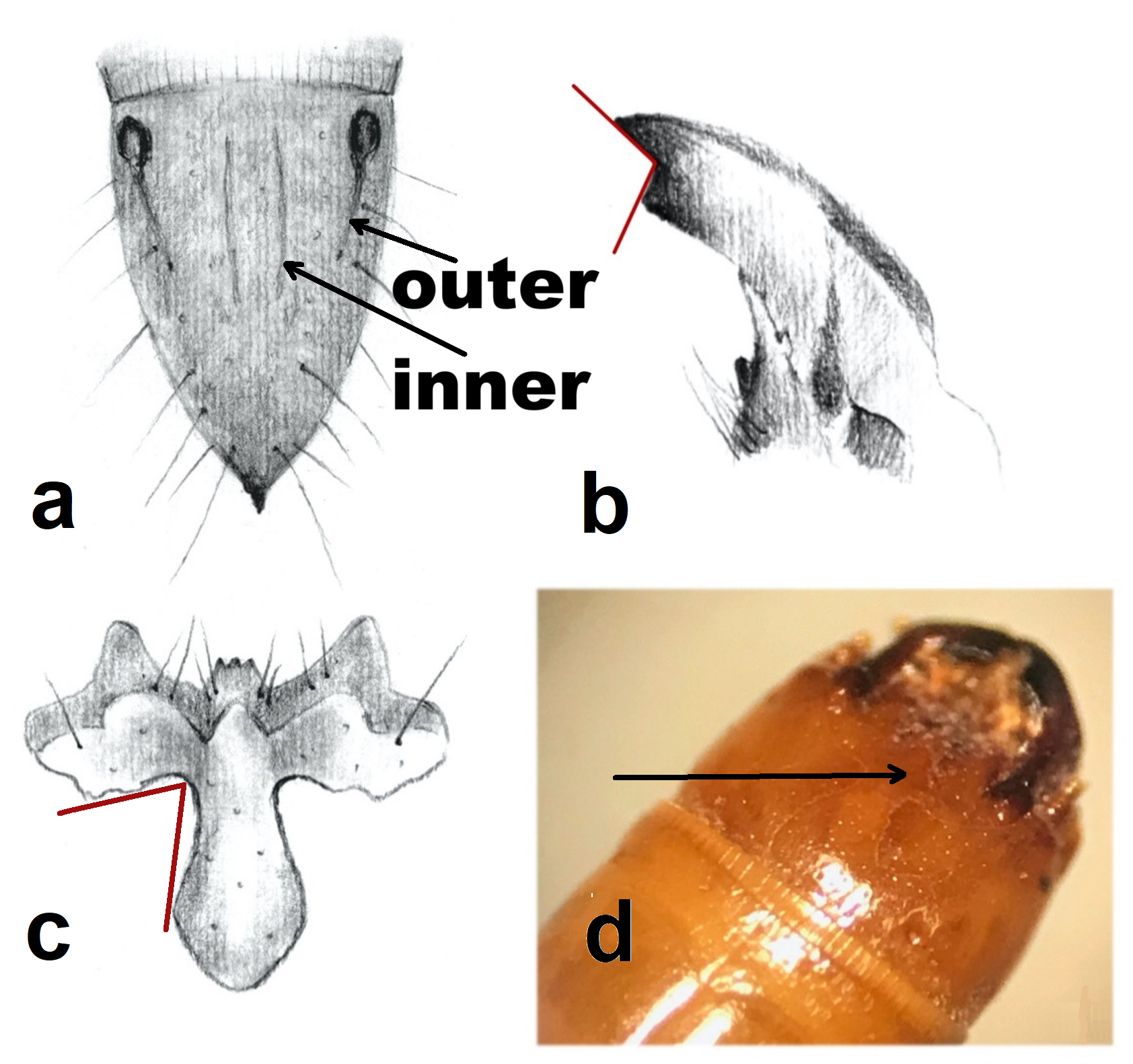
Diagnostic features of Agriotes brevis larvae: a) tip of abdomen with arrows pointing at outer and inner longitudinal lines, b) right mandible with marked angle larger than 90°, c) frontoclypeus with marked angle slightly smaller than 90°, d) location of frontoclypeus (arrow) on head of larva.

Before applying pesticides to infestations of Agriotes larvae (wireworms) in Europe, it is required to determine whether the population exceeds the damage threshold which varies from species to species. Therefore, it is necessary to identify the species causing the infestation. The distinguishing features of Agriotes brevis larvae are illustrated on the left and include: The length of the longitudinal lines on the last (9th) abdominal segment (figure a). In the specimens from northern Italy usually both, but at least one, of the inner lines is longer than the outer lines. In addition, the terminal spike of the abdomen is longer than wide. On the mandibles, the angle between its tip and the tip of the abapical tooth is slightly larger than 90° (figure b). The shape of the frontoclypeus on the head is characteristic (figures c and d). It forms an angle as indicated on figure c that is usually smaller than 90°. However, this angle can be variable and in northern Italy it is slightly larger than 90° in 3% of the specimens and about 90° in 17% of the larvae. Molecular identification of the larvae is also reliable.

== Biology ==
Females of the genus Agriotes lay their eggs into the soil, close to the surface. Often, grasslands and uncropped field margins provide the most favorable habitat for egg-laying and can be reservoirs from which the beetles spread into adjacent crops. Agriotes brevis is also common in grasslands and clippings of grass or alfalfa, spread on a plastic sheet, are attractive to this species. For egg-laying, A. brevis females prefers soil with a high water permeability. Compared to other Agriotes species, A. brevis adults have a long life span and the egg-laying extends over several months, they often overwinter. The larvae of A. brevis are polyphagous and the most common field crops attacked are maize, wheat, barley and alfalfa. They prefer young seedlings, where they feed on the roots and the base of the stem. During a survey in Croatia with pheromone traps, the highest density of A. brevis was found in areas where the previous crop was wheat, barley or soybean.

== Pheromones and traps ==
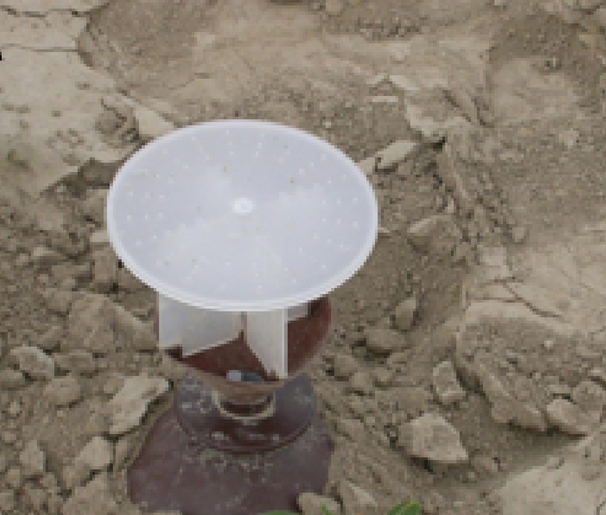
YATLORF sex pheromone trap for monitoring Agriotes species.

Agriotes brevis females produce geranyl butyrate and (E;E)-farnesyl butyrate in their pheromone glands and a 1:1 mixture of both compounds attracts large numbers of beetles, while both compounds alone catch few beetles. This mixture is most attractive over a distance of 10 m or less and remains active for more than 2 months under field conditions. The pheromone traps are installed at soil level and have been used in several countries for monitoring A. brevis. Apart from males, the above mixture also attracts females and is a sex pheromone as well as an aggregation pheromone. The trap design is import because A. brevis is mainly a crawling species and traps into which the beetles can both crawl into and fly into catch more beetles. The above mixture is not 100% species-specific for A. brevis. Geranyl butyrate on its own attracts mainly Agriotes sputator, apart from some A. brevis, while the addition of (E;E)-farnesyl butyrate, even at a dosage of 10%, suppresses the attractiveness for A. sputator, but does not inhibit it completely. Therefore, the 1:1 mixture of both compounds also catches a small number of A. sputator beetles.

Cut grass or alfalfa, spread on a plastic sheet is also attractive to Agriotes brevis adults, especially 2 to 3 days after cutting. Studies on the chemicals emitted by such grass traps identified a number of compounds and some mixtures of these are attractive to A. brevis under field conditions. For example, the "MINIM" lure, a 4-component mixture of (Z)-3-hexenyl acetate + methyl benzoate + (Z)-3-hexen-1-ol + methyl salicylate in a ratio of 300:5:30:30 mg attracts both female and male A. brevis.

Agriotes larvae can be trapped by bait traps placed into the soil. They consist of a plastic container, about 10 cm wide, with holes and contain moistened vermiculite and wheat plus maize seeds. The traps are placed about 5 cm below the soil surface and examined after 10 days. The larval bait traps are not specific to certain wireworm species and the catches need to be sorted and identified.

== Impact and management ==
=== Crop damage ===
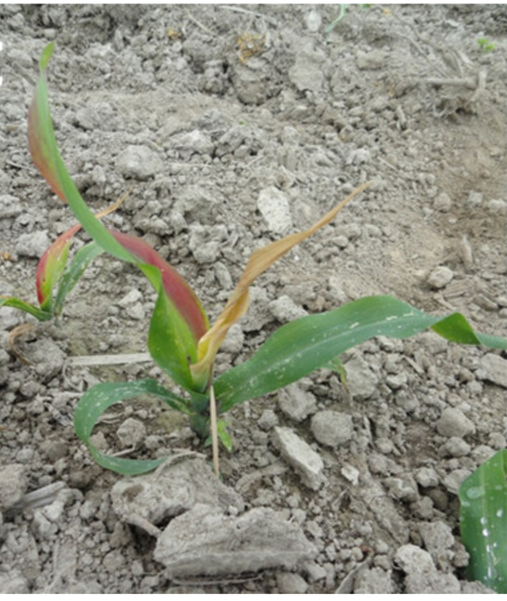
Wilting young maize plants due to damage to the stem base by Agriotes larvae

Agriotes brevis larvae cause serious damage to young maize plants in northern Italy and other countries of southern and central Europe. Other crops damaged by A. brevis include wheat, barley, alfalfa and sugar beet. The wireworms feed on the roots and the base of the stem and can cause wilting and plant death. Compared to the other pest species of Agriotes in southern Europe, A. brevis is the most harmful one for maize. Comparatively small numbers of wireworms can cause significant damage and losses. During 2011, 69 maize fields were examined for yield losses due to Agriotes species in northern Italy. Significant yield reduction due to A. brevis damage was found in 7 fields.

=== IPM thresholds ===
Since 2014, the adoption of an Integrated Pest Management (IPM) approach is required in Europe if pesticides are applied. As part of this approach, economic thresholds need to be established for different pest species and crops. Pesticides are then only applied once the pest population has reached these thresholds. For Agriotes species, such thresholds have been only established for maize and are based on the density of wireworms in the field, using bait traps. For Agriotes brevis, the IPM threshold for maize is reached if more than 1 larva is caught in a bait trap during 10 days of trapping. However, this threshold can vary according to environmental conditions and is only reliable for fields where i) no other food sources are available, ii) the soil temperature is above 8°C and iii) the humidity is near the field water capacity. A simpler but less accurate way of predicting possible damage to maize by A. brevis is to use the catches of adult beetles in pheromone traps.

=== Pesticide use ===
Until the 1990s, the persistent organochlorine pesticides lindane and aldrin were commonly used for wireworm control in Europe and were applied by broadcasting. However, they were progressively withdrawn from the market as their negative effects on human health and the environment became apparent. They were replaced by other pesticide groups like neonicotinoids which were usually applied as seed dressing, for example in maize or sugar beet. However, neonicotinoids also have negative environmental effects, especially on beneficial insects like honey bees and other pollinators.

=== Alternative control ===
With the increasing restrictions on the use of soil insecticides, alternative methods for the control of wireworms are being developed and applied. In practice, monitoring the wireworm population in the soil with bait traps or the adult beetle population with pheromone traps is the first step. There is a close correlation between pheromone catches and larval populations. If damaging levels of Agriotes species are detected in an area, then the planting of an alternative crop should be considered for that area. In general, crop rotation helps to reduce wireworm populations, as do practices like timing tilling and irrigation in order to destroy eggs and young wireworm larvae in the top soil layer by desiccation. The sowing time is also important for Agriotes brevis in maize since late sowing increases damage significantly.

Promising results have been further obtained with using pesticide-free control agents. These include, for example, defatted seed meals as biofumigants, calcium cyanamide as a repellent fertilizer or biological control agents like entomopathogenic fungi (e.g. Metarhizium brunneum).

== Taxonomy ==
Agriotes nigricollis Schwarz 1891 and Agriotes nigripennis Schwarz 1891 are sometimes listed as synonyms of Agriotes brevis, but these names were actually proposed as color varieties of A. brevis, which have reddish brown elytra (nigricollis) or are totally black, except for the antennae and legs (nigripennis). Therefore, they should be cited as Agriotes brevis var. nigricollis and Agriotes brevis var. nigripennis.
