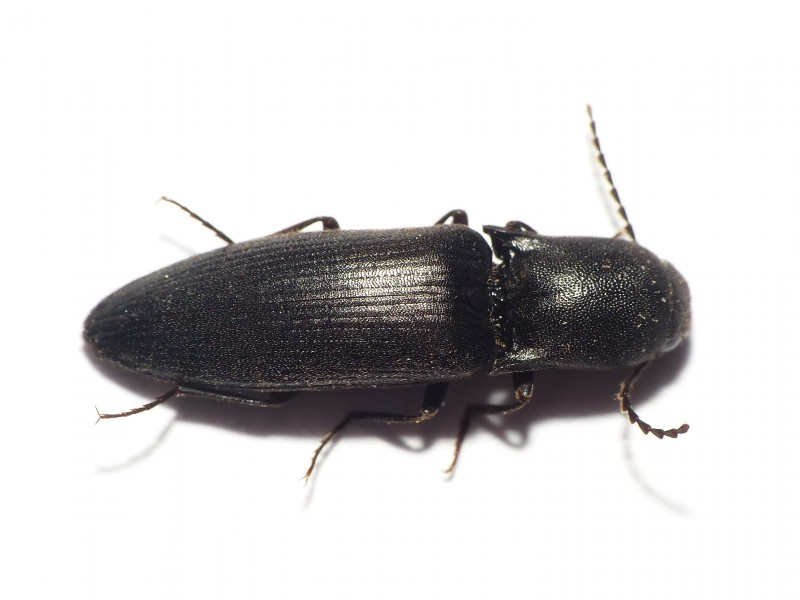
- Ectinus aterrimus

Scientific classification
- Domain: Eukaryota
- Kingdom: Animalia
- Phylum: Arthropoda
- Class: Insecta
- Order: Coleoptera
- Suborder: Polyphaga
- Infraorder: Elateriformia
- Family: Elateridae
- Genus: Ectinus; Eschscholtz, 1829

= Ectinus =

Genus of beetles

Ectinus is a genus of beetles belonging to the family Elateridae.

The species of this genus are found in Europe and Japan.

== Species ==
The following species are recognised in the genus Ectinus:

- Ectinus aterrimus (Linnaeus, 1760)
- Ectinus dahuricus
- Ectinus hidaensis
- Ectinus higonius
- Ectinus insidiosus
- Ectinus longicollis
- Ectinus nokozanus (Miwa, 1928)
- Ectinus puberulus
- Ectinus sepes
- Ectinus sericeus
- Ectinus sonanis (Miwa, 1928)
- Ectinus tamnaensis
- Ectinus yushiroi Suzuki, 1999
