= Michael Bach (entomologist) =

German botanist and entomologist (1808–1878)

Michael Bach (March 1808, Boppard –17 April 1878) was a German entomologist specialising in Coleoptera and a botanist. He was a teacher in Boppard and a Member of the Entomological Society of Stettin.

== Works ==
- Käferfauna für Nord- und Mitteldeutschland mit besonderer Rücksicht auf die Preussischen Rheinlande. III. Band, 5. Lieferung. Coblenz, 142 pp.
- Nachtrage und Verbesserungen zur Käferfauna von Nord- und Mitteldeutschland. Stettin. Ent. Ztg., 17, 7/8: 241-247 (1856).
- Bach M. 1859.
- Kaferfauna für Nord- und Mitteldeutschland Init besonderer Rucksicht auf die Preussischen Rheinlande. III. Band, 6. Lieferung. Coblenz, 143-317 s. (1859)
- Nachträge, Zusätze und Verbesserungen zum 3. Bande der Käferfauna. Coblenz, pp. 319–364 (1867).
- Studien und Lesefrüchte aus dem Buche der Natur : für jeden Gebildeten, zunächst für die reifere Jugend und ihre Lehrer . Vol.1-4 . Bachem, Köln 1867-1880 Digital edition by the University and State Library Düsseldorf

With Philipp Wilhelm Wirtgen he issued the exsiccata series Herbarium der seltenen oder weniger bekannten Pflanzen Deutschlands der Flora des Mittel- und Niederrheins.
