= Biofumigation =

Method of pest control

Biofumigation is a method of pest control in agriculture, a variant of fumigation where the gaseous active substance—fumigant—is produced by decomposition of plant material freshly chopped and buried in the soil for this purpose.

Plants from the Brassicaceae family (e.g., mustards, cauliflower, and broccoli) are primarily used due to their high glucosinolate content; in the process of decomposition, glucosinolates are broken down to volatile isothiocyanates which are toxic to soil organisms such as bacteria, fungi and nematodes, but less toxic and persistent in the environment than synthetic fumigants. Alternatively, grasses such as sorghum can be used, in which case hydrogen cyanide is produced to similar effect.

The method consists of mowing and chopping the plants during flowering to ensure maximum glucosinolate content and speed up decomposition. The ground needs to be irrigated to field capacity, after which the chopped material is incorporated into the top layer and covered with impermeable film to prevent the gas from escaping. After three or four weeks, the film is removed and the ground is ready for planting 24 hours later. Burying biofumigant crops after the growing season to plant cash crops normally next year may in theory lead to a build up of active substance in the soil after a few cycles of crop rotation, but direct short-term suppression of pests is not notable in this case.

The method can be used as a more sustainable and environment-friendly alternative to classic fumigation and other chemical pest control methods. Additionally, it can serve to replenish the nutrient content of the soil and promote growth of beneficial organisms. On the other hand, it requires changes in cultivation practice due to the time needed for the method to take effect, can be costly if biofumigant-producing plants need to be brought from elsewhere (i. e. if they are not used in crop rotation to be chopped and buried on site), and is difficult to standardize due to varying active substance content in different cultivars.

== See also ==
- biosolarization
