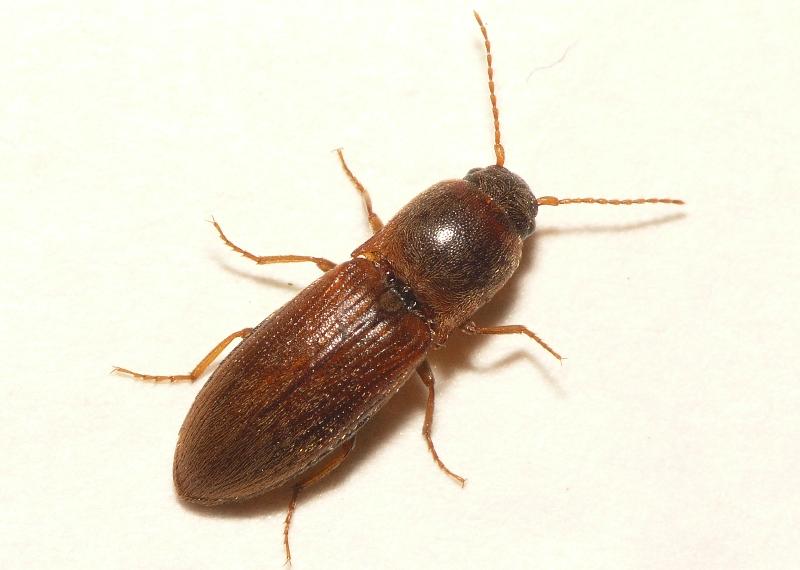

Scientific classification
- Kingdom: Animalia
- Phylum: Arthropoda
- Clade: Pancrustacea
- Class: Insecta
- Order: Coleoptera
- Suborder: Polyphaga
- Infraorder: Elateriformia
- Family: Elateridae
- Genus: Agriotes
- Species: A. sputator

Binomial name
- Agriotes sputator (Linnaeus 1758)

Synonyms
- Elater sputator Linnaeus 1758; Elater fusculus Illiger, 1805; Agriotes corallifer Eschscholtz, 1830; Agriotes cribrosus Eschscholtz, 1830; Agriotes graminicola Redtenbacher, 1849

= Agriotes sputator =

Species of beetle

Agriotes sputator, commonly known as the spitting click beetle (sputator = spitter in Latin) or the common click beetle, is a species from the family Elateridae, mainly found in Europe. Its distribution range extends to parts of Western Asia like Turkey, Syria and Iran, as well as to China in the east. It has been also recorded in parts of north-western Africa. Further, it was accidentally introduced into eastern Canada. Its natural habitat is grassland, where the larvae (wireworms) live in the soil, feeding mainly on the roots of grasses and various other plants. Crop fields are often invaded and A. sputator is regarded as a serious agricultural pest. Management relies mainly on the use of pesticides and cultural control methods, but the use of biological control agents is also being explored. The adult beetle is between 6 and 9 mm (0.24 and 0.35 in) long and has a variable coloration. Typically, it is dark brown to black, with the antennae and legs usually being reddish brown. The elytra are also often brownish.

== Distribution ==
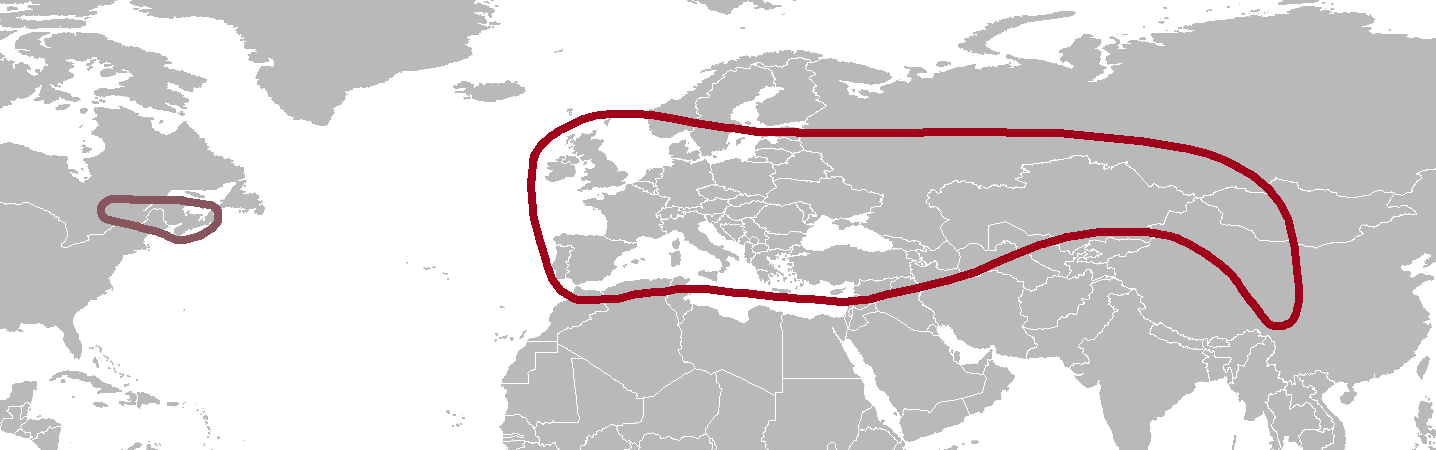
Distribution range of Agriotes sputator in Europe, Asia, northern Africa and North America.

Agriotes sputator is native to Europe and most common in the U.K., France, Germany, southern Sweden, Austria, Hungary, Poland and Switzerland. It appears to be absent only in Finland and in the northern parts of Norway, Sweden and Russia. In the south, it has been recorded from western parts of northern Africa like Morocco and Algeria, as well as from parts of the Near East like Turkey, Syria and Iran. In the east, the distribution range extends to parts of western Siberia in Russia and to Kazakhstan, Mongolia and some parts of China.

Agriotes sputator has been inadvertently introduced into North America where it is present in isolated localities in eastern Canada, particularly in Nova Scotia, Prince Edward Island, New Brunswick and Quebec. A survey for A. sputator around 2018 in western Canada using pheromone traps did not result in any catches. A single, isolated record of A. sputator from Indianapolis (U.S.A.) would appear to need confirmation.

== Description ==
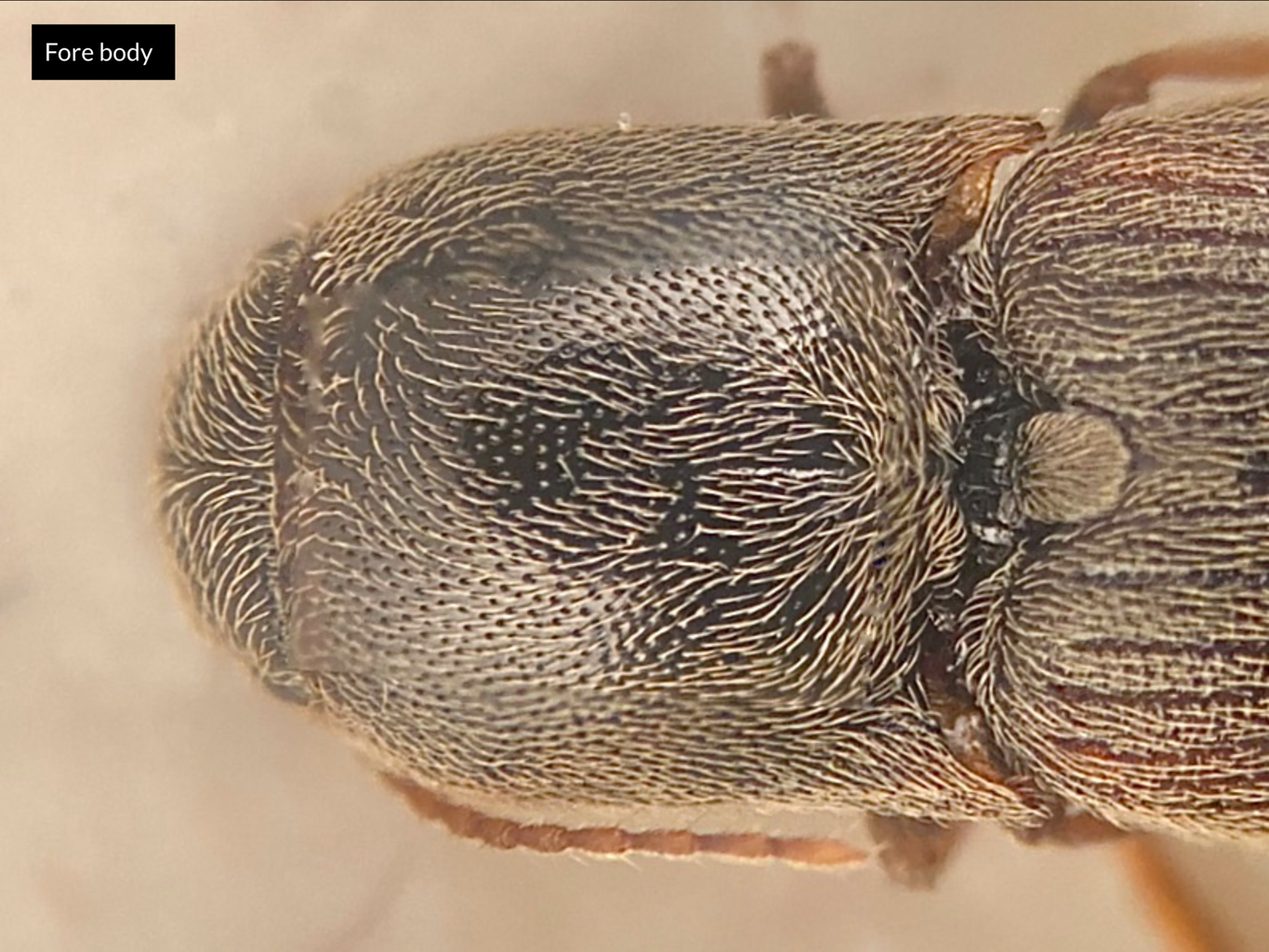
Agriotes sputator pronotum with arrangement of hairs.

The adult beetle of Agriotes sputator has a length of between 6 and 9 mm (0.24 and 0.35 in) and a width of between 1.8 and 2.8 mm (0.07 and 0.11 in). The head and pronotum are bluntly pointed. The antennae are as long as the total length of the head and pronotum and the second antennal segment is slightly longer than the third segment. Typically, the pronotum is longer than wide in males and as long as wide in females. The body is covered in dense, short greyish hairs and the pronotum has fine puncture marks.

The colour is variable. The general colour is brownish-black with the antennae, legs and the wing covers being lighter brownish ginger. The front edge and the hind lateral corners of the pronotum are also often lighter brown. In Europe, the most similar species are Agriotes sordidus and Agriotes brevis. A. sputator differs from these mainly by the shape and colour of the pronotum which is less densely punctured and more shiny between the punctures.

The larva is known as a wireworm and lives in the soil. It is yellow, slender, stiff and leathery, and grows to a length of about 17 to 20 mm (0.7 to 0.8 in). The centre of the mandible has a small tooth for gnawing. For identification, the most important feature of the larva is that each of the first eight abdominal segments has a belt-like region on the upper side with very fine granules that are densely spaced, whereas the remaining upper parts of the abdomen have much larger and more widely spaced granules. Molecular or genetic identification of the larvae has also been studied and is feasible.

== Life cycle ==
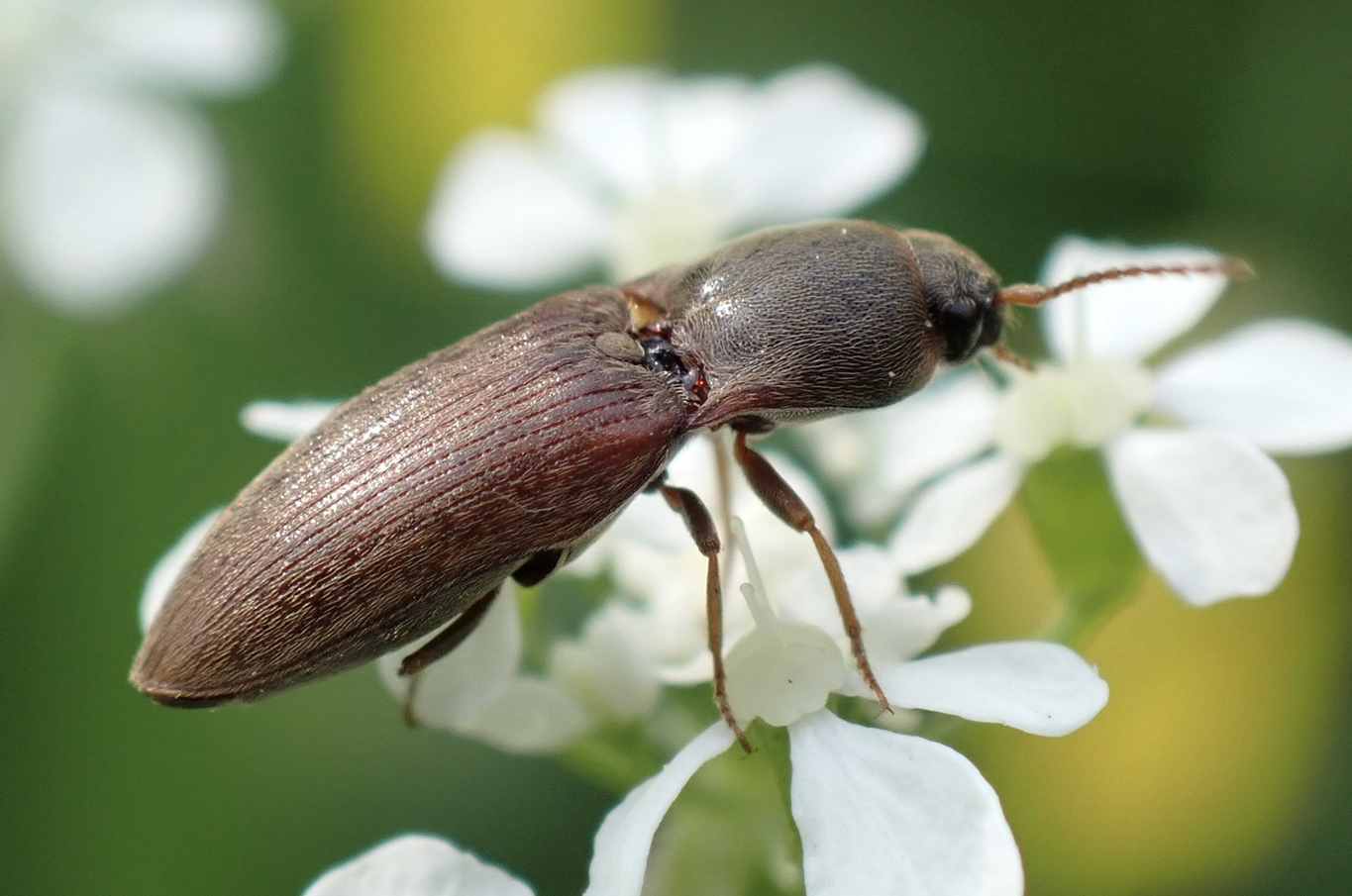
Agriotes sputator on flowers in the Netherlands

In Europe, the adults of Agriotes sputator are active for several months starting in April. About one hundred eggs are laid in batches, 2 to 5 cm (0.8 to 2.0 in) beneath the soil and hatch after about two weeks. The larvae develop in the soil for two to four years. They are polyphagous and feed on seeds and seedlings of various plants, including the new tillers of cereal crops. They gnaw their way into roots, finding their food by smell. The plants infested include, for example, species from the family Poaceae (true grasses) and the genus Plantago (plantains).

The larvae feed when the soil temperature exceeds 12 °C (54 °F) and need moist soil. They are killed by dry conditions or temperatures below about −6 °C (21 °F) but compensate by moving down through the soil to about 1 metre (3 ft 3 in) or so beneath the surface. They can survive for a long time without feeding. When fully-grown, the larvae pupate in late summer or early autumn in the soil. The adults emerge two to three weeks later, but remain in the soil until the coming spring. The whole life cycle (egg to egg) takes up to five years to complete. The adult beetles are more active in the afternoon and evening. They feed on the leaves of grasses and also on pollen, and are often seen on the flower-heads of umbelliferous plants.

== Ecology ==
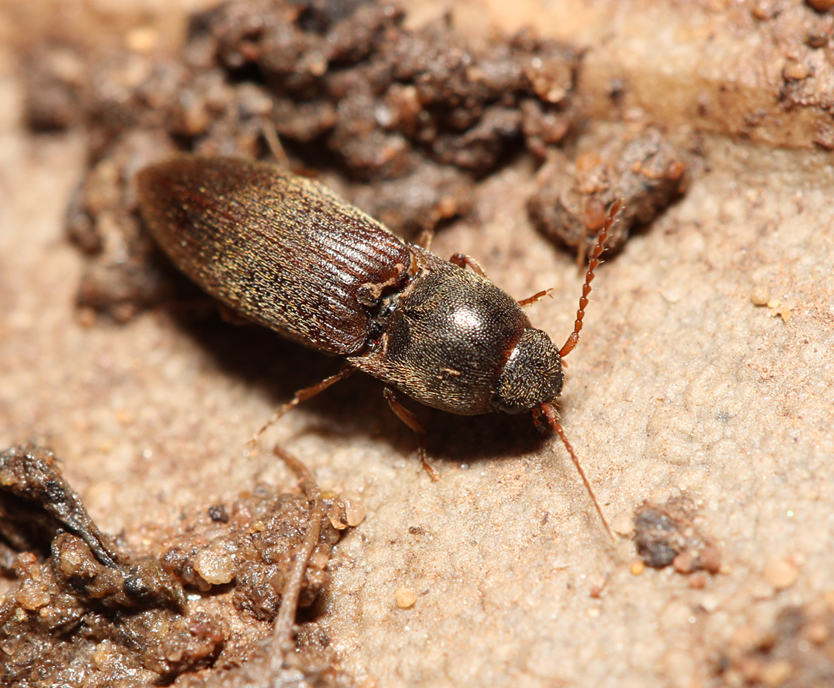
Agriotes sputator in Germany

Like for various other species of Agriotes, the natural habitat of Agriotes sputator is grassland, from where crops like cereals are often invaded. In Austria, most A. sputator larvae were found at medium altitude (300 to 500 m (980 to 1,640 ft), above sea level) and in areas with medium to low annual rainfall (around 750 mm (30 in)) as well as low soil pH. In Croatia, A. sputator was most common near crops like white clover, alfalfa, sugar beet and barley.

== Pheromones and traps ==
Extracts of the female pheromone gland of Agriotes sputator contain large amounts of geranyl butanoate with 6,7-epoxygeranyl butyrate as minor component. Pheromone traps baited with geranyl butanoate alone catch large numbers of A. sputator males. In contrast, the main pheromone component of Agriotes lineatus is geranyl octanoate, but the addition of 10% geranyl butanoate increases the catches of A. lineatus males considerably. Geranyl butanoate alone is commonly used to monitor the presence and abundance of A. sputator in Europe and Canada, using the YATLOR sex pheromone trap, the Vernon beetle trap or the Vernon pitfall trap.

== Impact and management ==
Like several other Agriotes species, the larvae (wireworms) of Agriotes sputator can cause significant crop damage and are among the most harmful common agricultural pest insects. Therefore, high levels of infestations require control actions by the farmers. Until the 1990s, such control has mainly relied on persistent organochlorine pesticides like lindane and aldrin. However, due to their harmful effects on the environment, alternatives have been and are still being explored. If significant damage by wireworms is detected, control practices include, for example, the planting of an alternative crop (crop rotation) and thorough soil cultivation, which exposes the larvae to predators.

=== Crop damage ===
The crops most commonly affected by Agriotes sputator are cereals like maize, wheat or barley, as well as clover, alfalfa, sunflower, sugar beet and peanut. Particular damage is done to germinating seed and seedlings. In crop fields, damage is often aggregated (patchy). Further, potatoes and other vegetables have been cited as high risk crops for A. sputator. Serious damage to potatoes by A. sputator has been reported from the U.K. and eastern Canada, with the wireworms tunnelling into the tubers.

=== Monitoring and trapping ===
Pheromone traps (see above) are commonly used for monitoring Agriotes sputator in agricultural fields. These are baited with geranyl butanoate alone and attract male beetles. However, release-recapture trials in the U.K. suggested that in contrast to other pest species of Agriotes like A. lineatus or A. obscurus, A. sputator males move relatively little and therefore, the pheromone traps are less efficient for this species. For monitoring A. sputator, pheromone traps are typically placed 5 to 20 m apart and the lure is renewed once a month. Trials in eastern Canada showed that priming the lure, that means maintaining it at room temperature for 3 weeks before using it in the field, approximately doubles the catches of A. sputator males.

=== Pesticide use ===
Since 2004, persistent organochloride pesticides are banned through the Stockholm Convention. Since then, mainly neonicotinoid and phenylpyrazole insecticides have been used for the control of Agriotes sputator. However, both classes of pesticides are very harmful to beneficial insects like honey bees. In addition, an EU directive, in effect since 2014, restricts the use of all chemical pesticides and promotes the use of Integrated Pest Management (IPM). An IPM approach requires:

- to monitor pest populations and apply pesticide only when significant economic damage is predicted,
- to give priority to non-chemical control methods.

While some insecticides like fipronil from the phenylpyrazole group cause high mortality to Agriotes sputator wireworms, the effect of neonicotinoid insecticides remains somewhat doubtful. In a four-year trial, treatment of seed potato tubers with imidacloprid did not prevent damage from A. sputator and other wireworms sufficiently. In addition, treatment by pesticides may cause only transitional effects in A. sputator and other wireworms, with the wireworms recovering after some time.

=== Non-chemical control ===
Crop rotation is most often recommended as an alternative to the use of chemical pesticides against Agriotes sputator wireworms. However, grass should be avoided in the crop sequence since it increases wireworm populations. Further, some potato varieties are more tolerant to attacks by Agriotes wireworms.

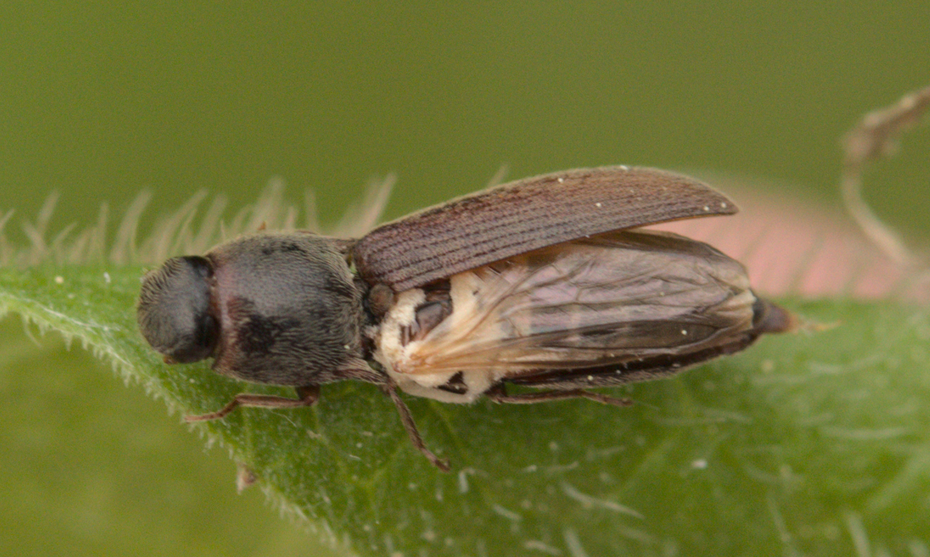
Agriotes sputator adult beetle infected by a fungus disease, possibly Zoophthora

There are a number of studies and observations on the natural enemies of Agriotes sputator. The larvae are eaten by birds such as rooks, crows and starlings, particularly just after ploughing, and are also preyed on by insects such as ground beetles. They are also subject to attack by parasitic insects and fungal pathogens.

Several fungal pathogens infect and kill Agriotes sputator larvae and adult beetles. For example, in Switzerland, natural infections of A. sputator adult beetles by Zoophthora elateridiphaga (previously called Entomophthora elateridiphaga) are relatively common and an outbreak (epizootic) in 1978 reduced the A. sputator population drastically there. Other pathogens include species from the genera Beauveria and Metarhizium which can be mass produced relatively easily. These readily infect and kill A. sputator wireworms in the laboratory, but field trials have so far only given mixed results. Attempts have been also made to improve the application of Metarhizium brunneum against A. sputator larvae by combining it with CO_{2} emitting Saccharomyces cerevisiae (baker's yeast) for an attract-and-kill treatment.

== Taxonomy ==
In his 10th edition of Systema Naturae published in 1758, Linnaeus described Elater sputator, the basionym of Agriotes sputator. His definition was: "thorace fusco nitido, elytris testaceis, corpore nigro"[thorax shiny dark, elytra reddish brown, body black] with the addition "Elater niger elytris fuscis, antennis pedibusque rufis"[a black species of Elater with dark elytra, antennae and legs reddish]. "Europe" was given as location. Apart from this basionym, a number of synonym names have been published for this species. These include:

1. Elater fusculus Illiger 1805 – In his review of Fabricius' "Systema Eleutheratorum" Illiger listed Elater sputator Linnaeus which had been also listed by Fabricius and Olivier. However, Illiger regarded Olivier' species as a variation of Elater vittatus which had been also described by Paykull under the name Elater obscurus. Illiger renamed Paykull's species as Elater fusculus.
2. Agriotes cribrosus Eschscholtz, 1830 – In his publication on the click beetles of Livland (the German name for Livonia, now Estonia and Latvia) Eschscholtz described this species as "m. nigro-fuscus, cinereo-pilosus; elytris antennis pedibusque ferrugineus; thorace breviusculo, profunde punctato, antice tumido et latiore; elytris ovato-oblongis. 3 Lin."[male dark black with greyish hairs; elytra, antennae and legs rusty coloured; thorax rather short, deeply punctured, the front swollen and broad; elytra ovate and elongated. 3 lines.] The measurement of 3 lines (in German "Linie") was probably equivalent to about 6.5 mm (0.26 in) per line.
3. Agriotes corallifer Eschscholtz, 1830 – Described in the same publication on the click beetles of Livland as "m. nigro-fuscus, cinereo-pilosus; elytris antennis pedibus thoracisque margine antico et postico rufo-ferrugineis; thorace subquadrato, antice angustato, dense punctulato, dorso gibbo; elytris oblongis 2½ Lin."[male dark black with greyish hairs; elytra, antennae, legs and the front and hind margins of the thorax reddish-brown; thorax square-like, the front narrower, densely punctured, the upper side humped; elytra elongated 2½ lines]. This species, the previous one and A. sputator were the only Agriotes species listed in Eschscholtz' publication.
4. Agriotes graminicola Redtenbacher, 1849 – In his book on the beetles of Austria, Redtenbacher described a beetle apparently from the collections of Megerle and Dejean that had been labelled as Agriotes fusculus, but which he renamed as A. graminicola because the name fusculus was already preoccupied by Illiger. Among his 7 species of Austrian Agriotes, A. fusculus was not listed, but A. sputator was. The species are listed in form of a key, in which he described A. sputator and A. graminicola as differing mainly in the shape of the pronotum (in A. sputator longer than wide, but in A. graminicola as wide as long) as well as in the colour of the first antennal segment (in A. sputator black or dark brown but in A. graminicola reddish yellowish like the rest of the antenna).

In addition to the above synonym names, Agriotes brunnicornis Gebler 1830 is sometimes listed as a synonym for Agriotes sputator, referring to the book chapter by Gebler on the insects of Sibiria (Russia), especially the Altai region. However, this chapter only contains the entry "7. E. brunnicornis. Prope Smeinogorsk rarus."[near Smeinogorsk, rare] under the genus Elater. Such a listing is not a valid taxonomic name, as it would need to be accompanied by a description.

Four subspecies of Agriotes sputator have been described:

- Agriotes sputator melanocephalus Desbrochers 1879
- Agriotes sputator productus Rey 1891
- Agriotes sputator negatus Buysson 1895
- Agriotes sputator depactus Buysson 1926
