= Johann Gottlieb Schaller =

German zoologist and entomologist

Johann Gottlieb Schaller (1734–1814) was a German zoologist and entomologist. He wrote Fortgesesste Beitrage zur Geschichte exotischer Papilions in Der Naturforscher 23: 49–53 in which he described many new species of butterflies.
