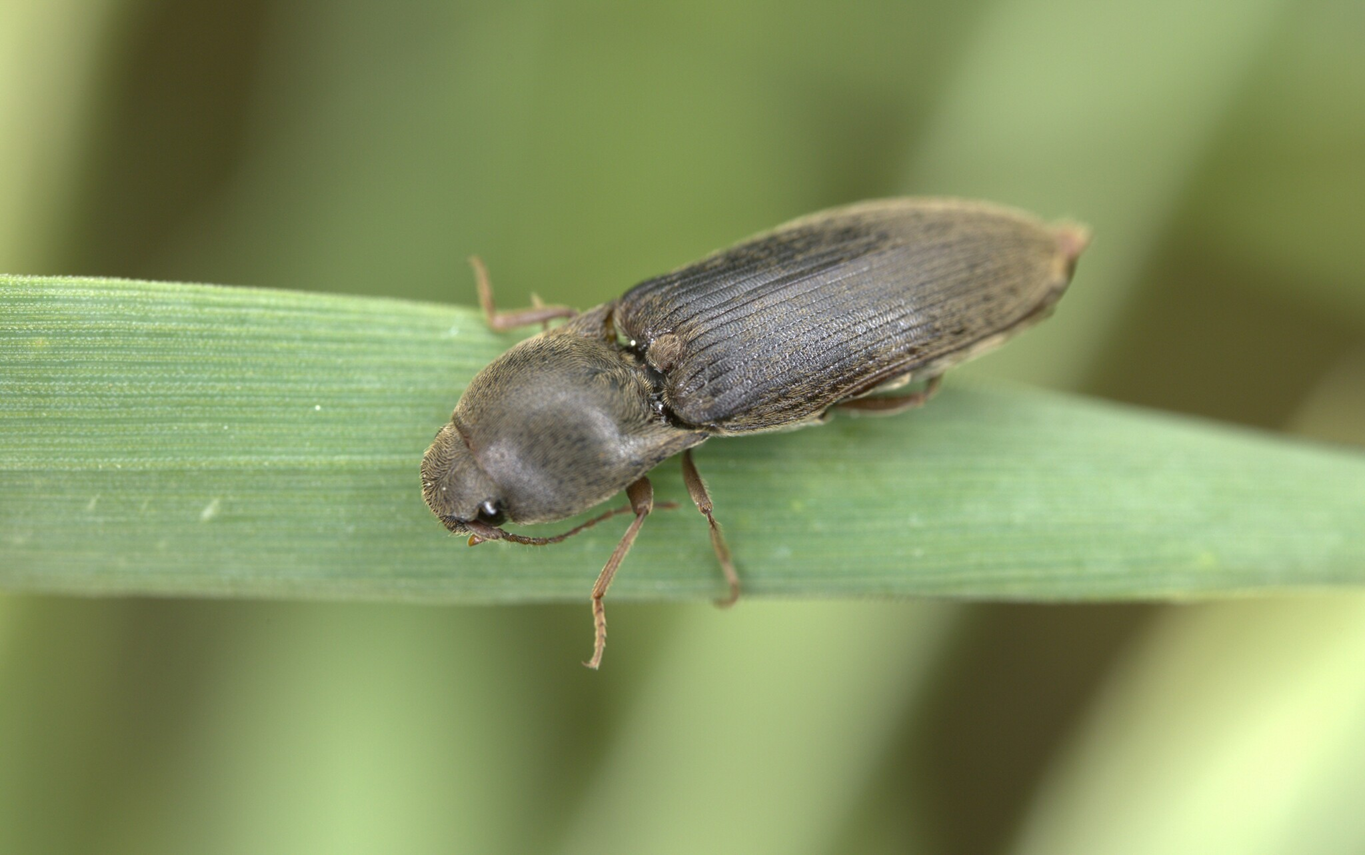

Scientific classification
- Kingdom: Animalia
- Phylum: Arthropoda
- Clade: Pancrustacea
- Class: Insecta
- Order: Coleoptera
- Suborder: Polyphaga
- Infraorder: Elateriformia
- Family: Elateridae
- Genus: Agriotes
- Species: A. sordidus

Binomial name
- Agriotes sordidus (Illiger 1807)

Synonyms
- Elater sordidus Illiger 1807; Agriotes italicus Baudi di Selve 1871; Agriotes hispanicus Desbrochers des Loges 1871

= Agriotes sordidus =

Species of beetle

Agriotes sordidus is a species of click beetle, family Elateridae, found in south-western Europe, mainly in Spain, Portugal, France, south-western Germany and northern Italy. In the north the distribution extends to southern England, the Netherlands and the Upper Rhine valley of Germany. There are also records from northern Africa and the Canary Islands. A. sordidus is a serious agricultural pest in France as well as in parts of Germany and Italy with the polyphagous larvae (wireworms) damaging maize, other cereals and various other crops like alfalfa. They feed on the roots and the lower stems of seedlings and can cause plant mortality. The adults feed on the leaves, but cause little damage. Pest populations can be monitored using pheromone traps or by baiting wireworms in the soil. In maize fields, trapping of more than two A. sordidus larvae in standard soil traps within 10 days indicates likely economic damage and the need for control action. In order to reduce the environmental impact of soil insecticides, non-chemical management options should be applied as much as possible. These include crop rotation or timing tillage and irrigation in a way so that the eggs and young larvae are desiccated in the top layer of the soil. The adult beetles of A. sordidus have a length of 8–9 mm and a blackish brown coloration. They can be separated from other similar species like Agriotes rufipalpis, A. obscurus, and A. sputator by a combination of features like the shape of the pronotum, the densely punctured thorax, the shape and ridges on the elytra, as well as the coloration. The larvae can be identified by the tip of the abdomen and by other features.

== Distribution ==
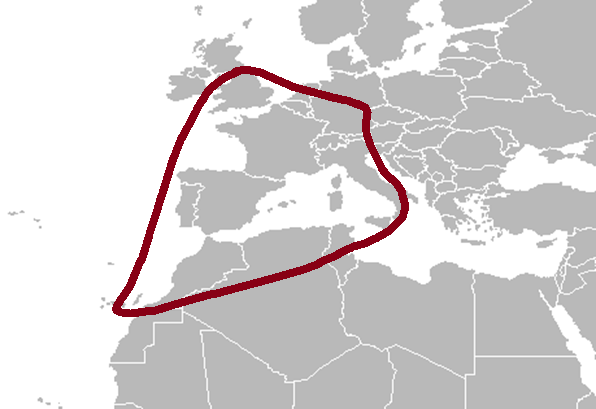
Distribution range of Agriotes sordidus in Europe and North Africa.

Agriotes sordidus was originally described from a specimen collected near Coimbra in Portugal. The type locality of Agriotes hispanicus, which is regarded as a synonym of A. sordidus, was given as "Algesiras", the French name of Algeciras at the southern tip of Spain, not far from Gibraltar. Most subsequent records of A. sordidus are from France including Corsica. Other records are from southern England, Belgium, parts of the Netherlands, southern and western Germany (extending in the north until the Upper Rhine valley), Switzerland, Italy and coastal parts of north-western Africa, including from east to west: Tunisia, Algeria, Morocco and parts of the Canary Islands.

Agriotes sordidus was also reported from north-western Hungary in 2023. However, these records were disputed, based on comparison with specimens from Italy and Spain.

== Description ==
The adult beetles of Agriotes sordidus are 8–9 mm long. They can be identified by the following combination of characters:

- head and pronotum densely punctured,
- pronotum domed, anterior margin rounded,
- body broad, similar to Agriotes obscurus but somewhat more elongated,
- dorsal side blackish brown, scutellum reddish or anterior margin of pronotum lighter or in some specimens the whole body lighter brown,
- antennae broad, in males not longer than pronotum,
- hind margins of the hind coxal plates slightly concave and very distinctly narrowing towards the sides,
- elytra more than double as long as wide, gaps between ridges deep with dense punctures.

The species most similar to Agriotes sordidus are A. rufipalpis, A. sputator, A. medvedevi and A. obscurus. The adults of A. rufipalpis can be separated by the more elongated pronotum ("distinctly longer than wide"), when compared to A. sordidus ("slightly longer than wide"). Both species have different distribution ranges, with A. rufipalpis being confined to south-eastern Europe. In addition, the larvae of both species are indistinguishable and both species are attracted to the same pheromone. A. sputator can be distinguished by the structure of the male genitalia. A. medvedevi differs from A. sordidus mainly by the head being less densely punctured with smooth areas in between the punctures. A. obscurus is broader than A. sordidus with a less domed pronotum and with the elytra usually having a lighter color.

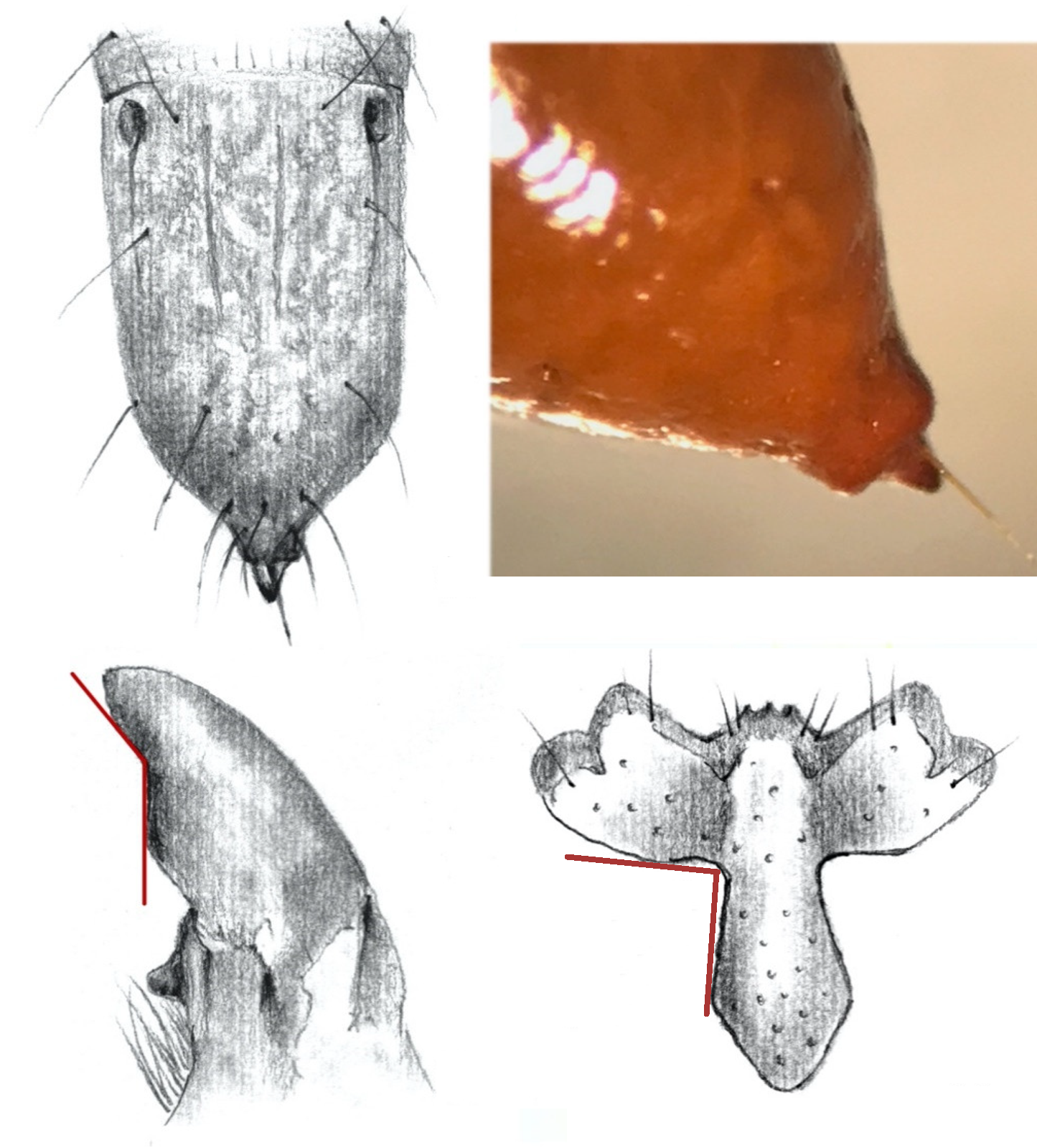
Morphological features of Agriotes obscurus larvae - top row: tip of abdomen, bottom left: mandible, bottom right: frontoclypeus

The morphology of the Agriotes sordidus larvae is characterized by an unusual shape of the abdominal tip and the shape of the mandibles and the frontoclypeus, see illustrations on the right. The tip of the abdomen, the ninth segment, has a subconical shape, shrinking abruptly in the apical fourth. The base of the apical spike has a square, bulge-like structure. The indicated angle on the mandible between the apical tip and the subapical tooth is much larger than 90°, on average around 150° with a range of 130° to 170°. The indicated angle on the frontoclypeus is a right angle. Further, the larvae can be reliably identified with molecular methods.

== Biology ==
Like other species of Agriotes, the larvae (wireworms) of Agriotes sordidus are polyphagous, feeding on the roots and stem base of cereals, grasses and various other plants. Mainly seedlings are attacked and the damage often results in plant mortality. Agriculturally important food plants include cereal crops like maize and barley as well as forage crops like alfalfa.

In Italy, Agriotes sordidus adults emerge from the soil around late March to early April. As demonstrated by pheromone traps, the males are active from April to August and have a distinct activity peak in May. The adults feed on leaves, but cause little damage. Eggs are laid in May or June and the larvae go through 8 to 13 instars over several years, depending on the environmental conditions. In Germany, A. sordidus has a comparatively short life cycle of 2-3 years compared to other Agriotes species. In Italy, the total life cycle may be completed within two years under favorable conditions, but can be longer. Temperature is an important factor and about 3900 degree days are required for the development from egg to adult.

== Pheromones and traps ==
Agriotes sordidus females produce geranyl hexanoate and (E,E)-farnesyl hexanoate in their pheromone glands. The released volatiles consist mainly of the former compound with only traces of the latter. In the field, geranyl hexanoate on its own attracts large numbers of A. sordidus and the addition of (E,E)-farnesyl hexanoate has no effect on the catches. Both sexes are attracted and 10–40% of the trapped adults are females. Geranyl hexanoate is also a pheromone of Agriotes rufipalpis, as well as a component of the pheromone of Agriotes obscurus.

Agriotes sordidus larvae are attracted by CO_{2} and other volatiles emitted by the roots of the host plant. In the case of barley, these chemical cues are a mixture of four specific aldehydes. The larvae can be trapped by bait traps placed into the soil. These consist of a plastic container, about 10 cm wide, with holes and contain moistened vermiculite and wheat plus maize seeds. The traps are placed about 5 cm below the soil surface and examined after 10 days. However, the larval bait traps also attract other wireworm species and the catches need to be sorted and identified.

== Impact and management ==
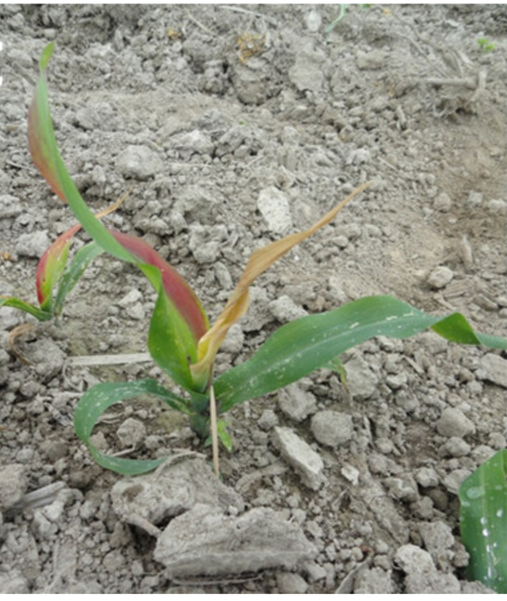
Wilting young maize plants due to damage to the stem base by Agriotes larvae

Agriotes sordidus larvae develop faster than most other pest species in the genus Agriotes. Therefore, they can reach a size that causes significant damage to crops already three to four months after they hatch from the eggs. This includes crops planted in late summer or early autumn. Like other Agriotes species, A. sordidus larvae are polyphagous, feeding on the roots and the lower stems of various grasses and other plants. Among agricultural crops, cereals like maize or barley are most often attacked. Damage to other crops like alfalfa, lettuce, sunflower and potatoes has been also reported. Seedlings are preferred and these can suffer mortality due to the wireworms feeding on the roots and the stems. In Italy, a low density of A. sordidus wireworms can already cause serious damage to maize, along with Agriotes brevis. In France and Germany A. sordidus has also been reported as a major agricultural pest. In Italy, the IPM threshold for maize has been determined to be 2 larvae caught in standard bait traps over 10 days. This threshold indicates that significant damage can be expected at that population level and that Integrated Pest Management (IPM) should be implemented.

To prevent significant economic damage to maize and other crops by Agriotes sordidus wireworms, neonicotinoid insecticides are often applied. However, these are highly toxic to beneficial insects like honey bees. In addition, an EU directive, in effect since 2014, restricts the use of pesticides and promotes the use of Integrated Pest Management (IPM). An IPM approach requires:

- to monitor pest populations and apply pesticide only when significant economic damage is predicted,
- to give priority to non-chemical control methods.

Non-chemical control methods against Agriotes sordidus and other wireworms include:

- crop rotation,
- timing tillage and irrigation in a way so that the eggs and young larvae are desiccated in the top layer of the soil,
- biocidal meals like Brassica seed meals,
- biological control agents.

== Taxonomy ==
More than 10 subspecies of Agriotes sordidus have been described, reflecting the variability of this species. In addition, two species names are regarded as synonyms, apart from the basionym Elater sordidus. These are:

1. Agriotes italicus Baudi di Selve 1871 – In the original description the name of the author was misspelled as "Flaminio Baudi a Selve". Baudi described A. italicus as a footnote to the species Agriotes meticulosus Candeze, 1863 in his article "Coleopterorum messis in insula Cypro et Asia minore ..." [Beetle harvest from Cyprus island and Asia Minor ...]. He did not mention any locality in his description, but the name italicus suggests that it was not collected in Cyprus or Turkey. The original description mentions the similarity to Agriotes sordidus and a note by the editor of the publication states that it may be part of sordidus which is highly variable.
2. Agriotes hispanicus Desbrochers des Loges 1871 – This species was described as having features that are intermediate between A. sputator and A. sordidus. The differences to A. sordidus are stated as A. hispanicus being shorter, the fore femora being narrower, and the antennal segments 2 to 9 being nearly equal.
