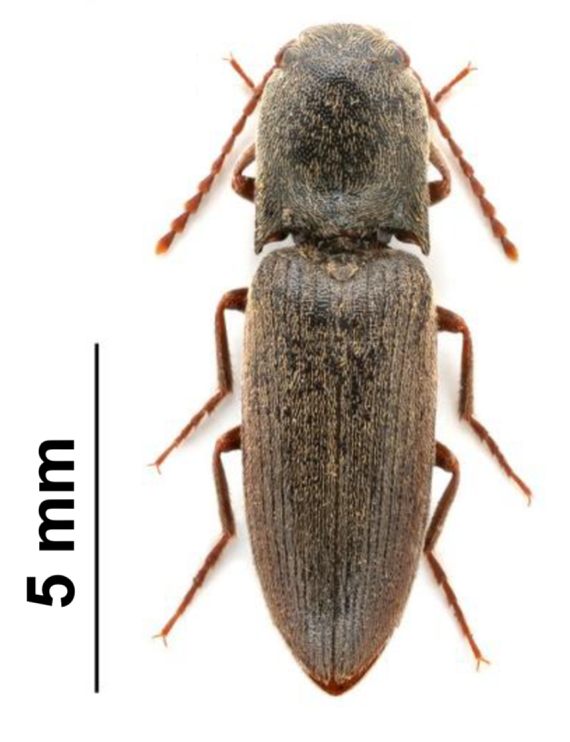

Scientific classification
- Kingdom: Animalia
- Phylum: Arthropoda
- Class: Insecta
- Order: Coleoptera
- Suborder: Polyphaga
- Infraorder: Elateriformia
- Family: Elateridae
- Genus: Agriotes
- Species: A. rufipalpis

Binomial name
- Agriotes rufipalpis (Brullé 1832)

Synonyms
- Elater rufipalpis Brullé 1832; Agriotes piceolus Küster 1853; Agriotes rubiginosus Candèze 1863; Agriotes suturalis Schwarz 1891

= Agriotes rufipalpis =

Species of beetle

Agriotes rufipalpis is a species of click beetle, family Elateridae, found in the Balkans and some neighboring countries. The distribution range extends up to Austria, Hungary and Slovakia in the north and to Turkey in the south and includes Croatia, Albania, Serbia, Romania, Bulgaria and Greece. A. rufipalpis can be common in Hungary and Greece where the larval stages (wireworms) are often regarded as a serious agricultural pest of maize and other cereals as well as of other crops. The adult beetles of A. rufipalpis are very similar in size, morphology, coloration and biology to those of A. sordidus. Both species can be easily confused. In addition, they are both attracted to the same pheromone and the larval stages are indistinguishable. The main difference between both species is the shape of the pronotum which is narrower in A. rufipalpis ("distinctly longer than wide") compared to A. sordidus ("slightly longer than wide").

== Taxonomy ==
Agriotes rufipalpis was originally described by Brullé as "Elater (Agriotes? Esch.) rufipalpis Br." This description was part of the French military-scientific Morea expedition in Greece, during the first half of the 19th century. Although Brullé did not give a locality in his description, the type locality can be assumed to be Greece, based on the nature of the publication. Brullé noted the close similarity to Elater variabilis Fabr., a synonym of Agriotes obscurus. Apart from the basionym Elater rufipalpis, several other names have been cited as synonyms of A. rufipalpis. These are:

1. Agriotes piceolus Küster 1853 – In his publication "Die Käfer Europa's" [The beetles of Europe], Küster described A. piceolus from Makarska in Croatia, noting that it is very similar to Agriotes gallicus and of blackish brown color with brownish legs and reddish-brown femura.
2. Agriotes rubiginosus Candèze 1863 – In his monograph of the family Elateridae, Candèze described A. rubiginosus from Corfu on the north-western coast of Greece. The species is described as similar to Agriotes sputator with a black color and rusty elytra.
3. Agriotes suturalis Schwarz 1891 – In his revision of the palearctic species of Agriotes, Otto Schwarz described suturalis as a color variation of Agriotes rufipalpis (Agriotes rufipalpis var. suturalis) from Greece. The coloration of the elytra is described as black for A. rufipalpis, but that of the var. suturalis either as reddish-brown or with a faint black band.

== Distribution ==
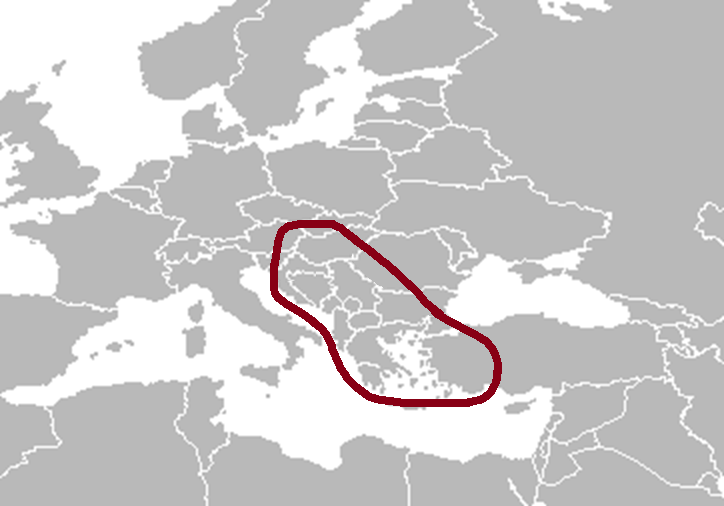
Distribution range of Agriotes rufipalpis in south-eastern Europe and Turkey.

Agriotes rufipalpis was originally described from Greece. The type localities of the 3 species that are regarded as synonyms (see previous section) are Makarska in Croatia (A. piceolus), Corfu in north-western Greece (A. rubiginosus) and Greece again (A. suturalis). Other distribution records from south-eastern Europe are from Hungary, where it can be common, Slovakia, Austria, Serbia, Albania, Romania and Bulgaria. There are also some collection records from Turkey. Apart from Hungary, A. rufipalpis is also common and widespread in Greece. In both countries it has been described as the most abundant species of Agriotes.

== Description ==
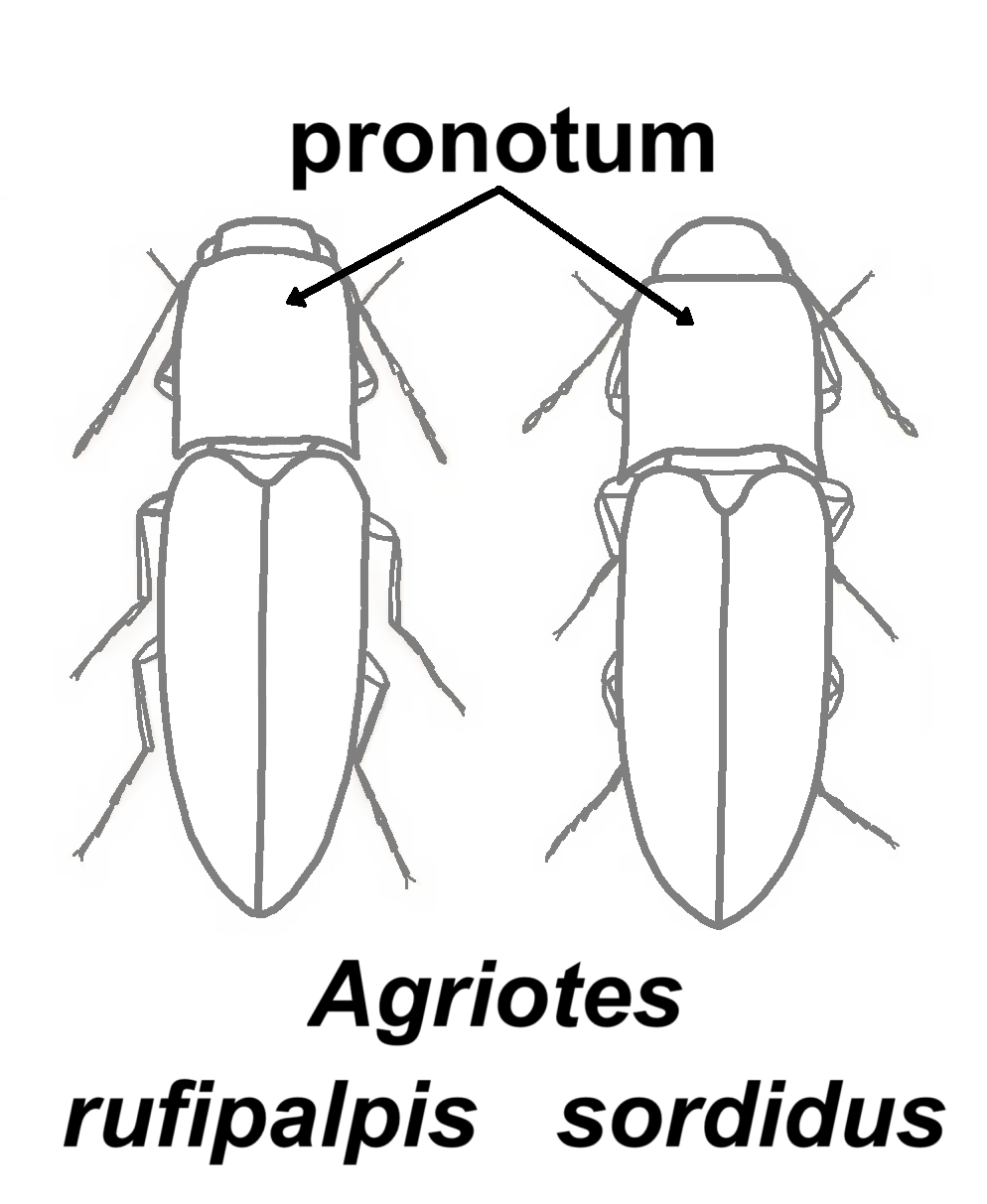
Comparison of Agriotes rufipalpis (left) and A. sordidus (right). The pronotum of A. rufipalpis is narrower and the antennae of males are longer in A. rufipalpis.

Agriotes rufipalpis adult beetles are of medium size, 7–9 mm long with a black coloration. In some specimens, the sides of the elytra may be lighter. The pronotum is "distinctly longer than wide" in contrast to the very similar A. sordidus where the pronotum is only "slightly longer than wide or as wide as long". Head and pronotum of A. rufipalpis are densely punctured. The differences between A. rufipalpis and A. sordidus are often not very clear and both species can be easily confused. This is partly due to the morphological variability of A. sordidus. However, the distribution range of both species do not overlap, with A. rufipalpis being restricted to eastern Europe, where A. sordidus is not found. Apart from the narrower pronotum, A. rufipalpis has longer antennae compared to A. sordidus and there are also differences in the structure of the male genitalia.

The larval stages of Agriotes rufipalpis are morphologically indistinguishable from those of A. sordidus. However, the larvae of both species can be separated with molecular methods.

== Biology and management ==
Although Agriotes rufipalpis is regarded as a serious agricultural pest in south-eastern Europe, there is little information available on its biology and management. Like other species of Agriotes, the larvae (wireworms) of A. rufipalpis are polyphagous, feeding on the roots and stem base of cereals, grasses and various other crops. The main crops attacked include maize, wheat and potatoes. In Greece, adult beetle are active from April to August with the peak activities from mid April to early June, as determined by pheromone catches. The adult beetles survive for an extended period of time and overwinter.

Since A. sordidus has a very similar biology, the management recommendations for that species might also apply to A. rufipalpis. In Turkey, chemical insecticides with broad-spectrum active ingredients such as organochlorine, organophosphates, and carbamates have been predominantly used against A. rufipalpis and other wireworm species. However, A. rufipalpis showed susceptibility to several native entomopathogenic nematode species like Steinernema carpocapsae and Heterorhabditis bacteriophora, suggesting that it could be feasible to develop a more environmentally friendly control method.

== Pheromones and traps ==
The composition of the pheromone gland of Agriotes rufipalpis has not yet been determined, but males are attracted to geranyl hexanoate. This compound is the pheromone of Agriotes sordidus and attracts also Agriotes gallicus. In combination with the pheromone lure, VARb, YATLOR and pitfall traps are effective for catching A. rufipalpis and these traps have been used in Greece to monitor the pest population, catching high numbers.
