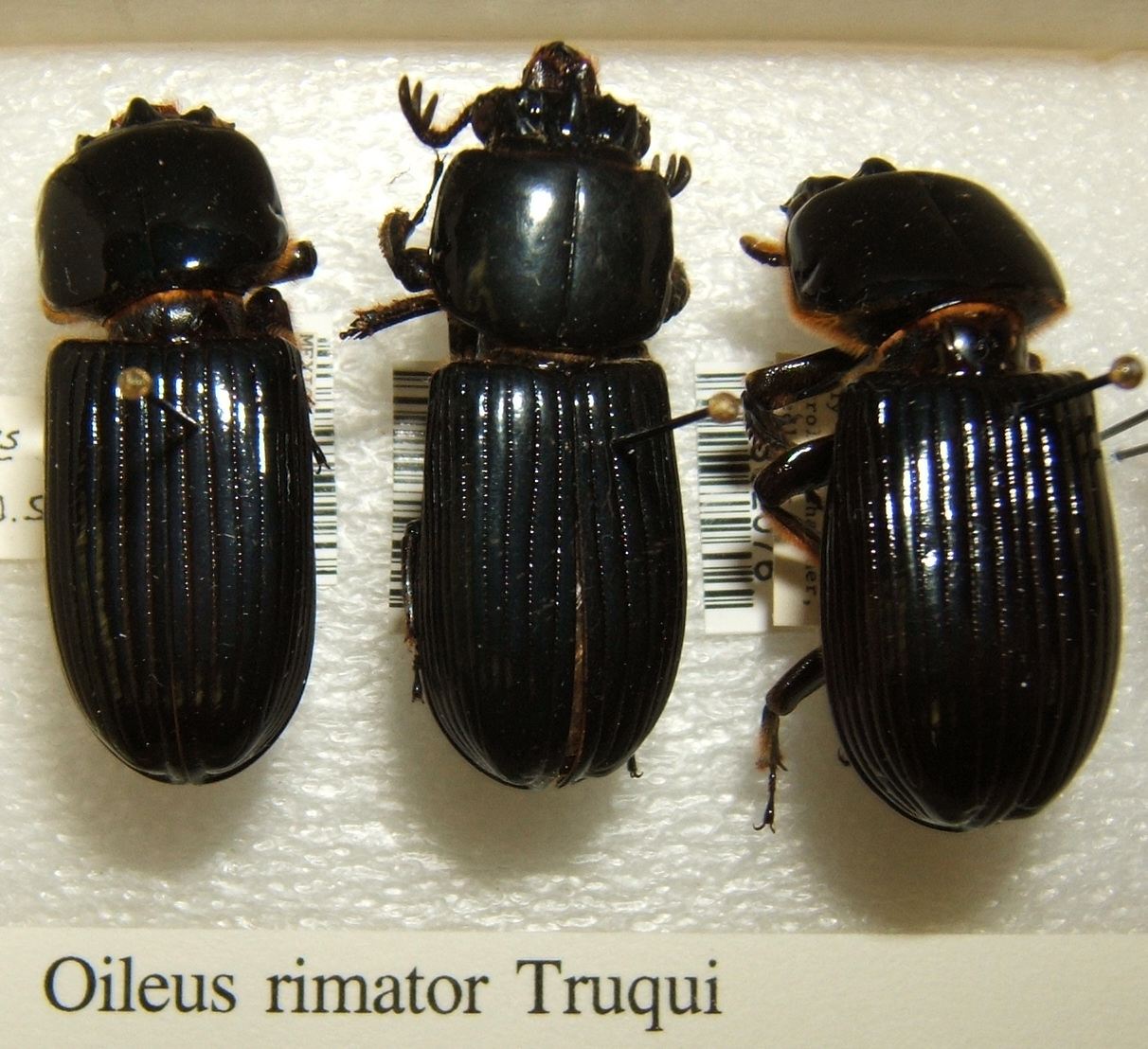
- Oileus rimator, adults

Scientific classification
- Kingdom: Animalia
- Phylum: Arthropoda
- Class: Insecta
- Order: Coleoptera
- Suborder: Polyphaga
- Infraorder: Scarabaeiformia
- Family: Passalidae
- Genus: Oileus
- Species: O. rimator

Binomial name
- Oileus rimator (Truqui, 1857)

Synonyms
- Passalus rimator Truqui, 1857; Rimor munitus Casey, 1897

= Oileus rimator =

Species of beetle

Oileus rimator is a beetle of the family Passalidae. It is found in Mexico, on both sides of the Isthmus of Tehuantepec at elevations of 800–2,860 m (2,620–9,380 ft).

== Description ==
Adult Oileus rimator measure 30–40 mm (1.2–1.6 in) in length. It is a macropterous species, in contrast to some of its congeners.

In a nutritional study of edible insects, Oileus rimator larvae were found to be 21% protein, compared to 80% for adult female gypsy moths (Lymantria dispar). Another study found that the larvae contained 36% crude protein.
