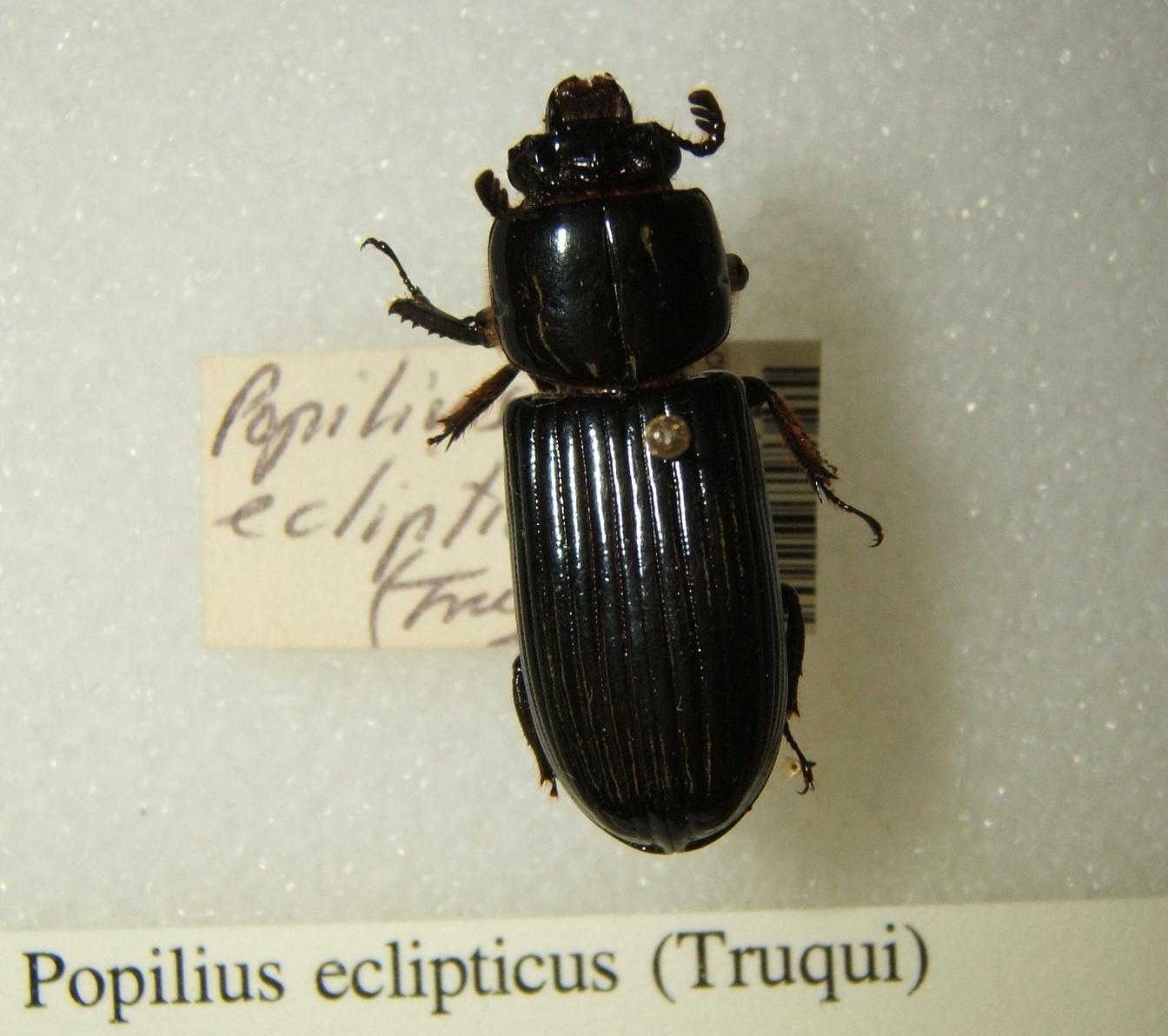
- Heliscus eclipticus (syn. Popilius eclipticus), adult

Scientific classification
- Domain: Eukaryota
- Kingdom: Animalia
- Phylum: Arthropoda
- Class: Insecta
- Order: Coleoptera
- Suborder: Polyphaga
- Infraorder: Scarabaeiformia
- Family: Passalidae
- Genus: Heliscus
- Species: H. eclipticus

Binomial name
- Heliscus eclipticus (Truqui, 1857)

Synonyms
- Passalus eclipticus Truqui, 1857; Popilius guatemalae Gravely, 1918; Popilius felschei Kuwert, 1891

= Heliscus eclipticus =

Species of beetle

Heliscus eclipticus is a beetle of the family Passalidae. It is found in Mexico, Central America, and northernmost South America (Colombia).
