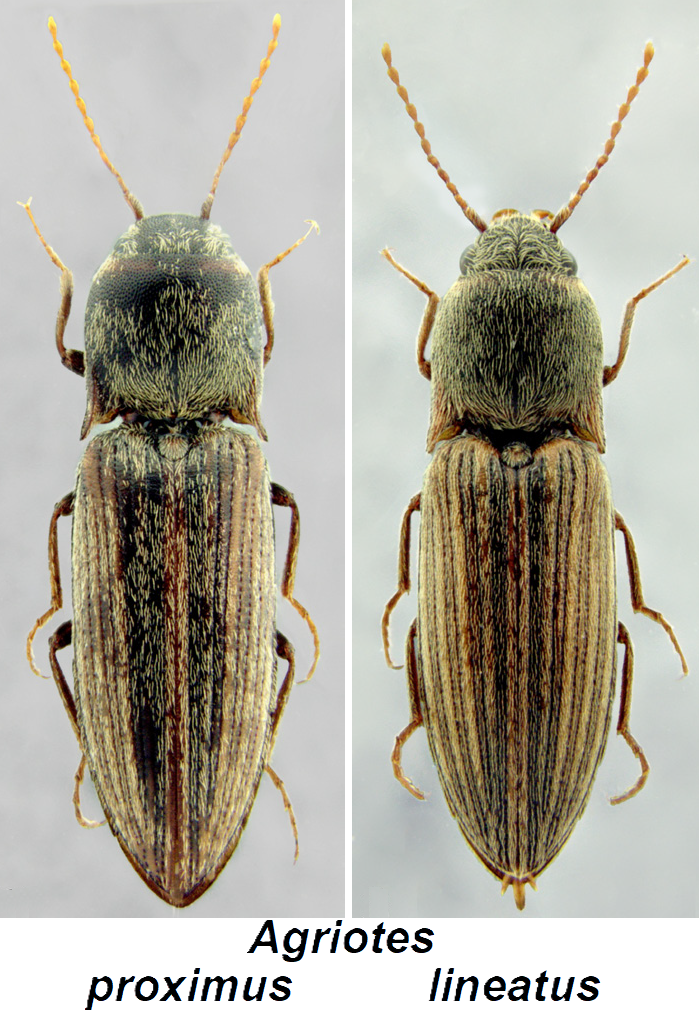
- Comparison between Agriotes proximus (left) and Agriotes lineatus (right). The pronotum of A. proximus is wider and more strongly domed.

Scientific classification
- Kingdom: Animalia
- Phylum: Arthropoda
- Clade: Pancrustacea
- Class: Insecta
- Order: Coleoptera
- Suborder: Polyphaga
- Infraorder: Elateriformia
- Family: Elateridae
- Genus: Agriotes
- Species: A. proximus

Binomial name
- Agriotes proximus Schwarz 1891

Synonyms
- Agriotes lineatoides Reitter 1911

= Agriotes proximus =

Species of beetle

Agriotes proximus is a species of click beetle from the family Elateridae. Its main distribution range is in southern Europe, in the north it can be found up to parts of Poland, Austria, Slovakia and Hungary, and in the east up to Ukraine and parts of Russia. It is also found in neighboring parts of western Asia like Azerbaijan, Turkey or Israel. A. proximus is extremely similar to Agriotes lineatus and was originally described as a variety of that species. Both species can be easily confused and differ only in minor morphological details. In addition, both species are attracted to the same pheromone and no significant differences have so far been found in their DNA structure. In most taxonomic lists and reviews of the genus Agriotes, A. proximus and A. lineatus are treated as separate species, but doubts have been expressed by other authors on whether they are indeed separate species. The ecology and biology are also identical in both species, as is the morphology of the larvae.

== Description ==
Most descriptions of Agriotes proximus are limited to its differences to the very similar Agriotes lineatus. On average, the size of A. proximus appears to be slightly larger and its length is given as ranging between 8 and 11 mm, as compared to 7.5-10.5 mm for A. lineatus. The main morphological differences are found in the shape of the pronotum which is described as broader and more strongly domed, being slightly wider than long in A. proximus. The pronotum of A. lineatus is usually longer than wide, rarely as wide as long. The coloration and the stripes on the elytra of A. proximus are identical to those of A. lineatus.

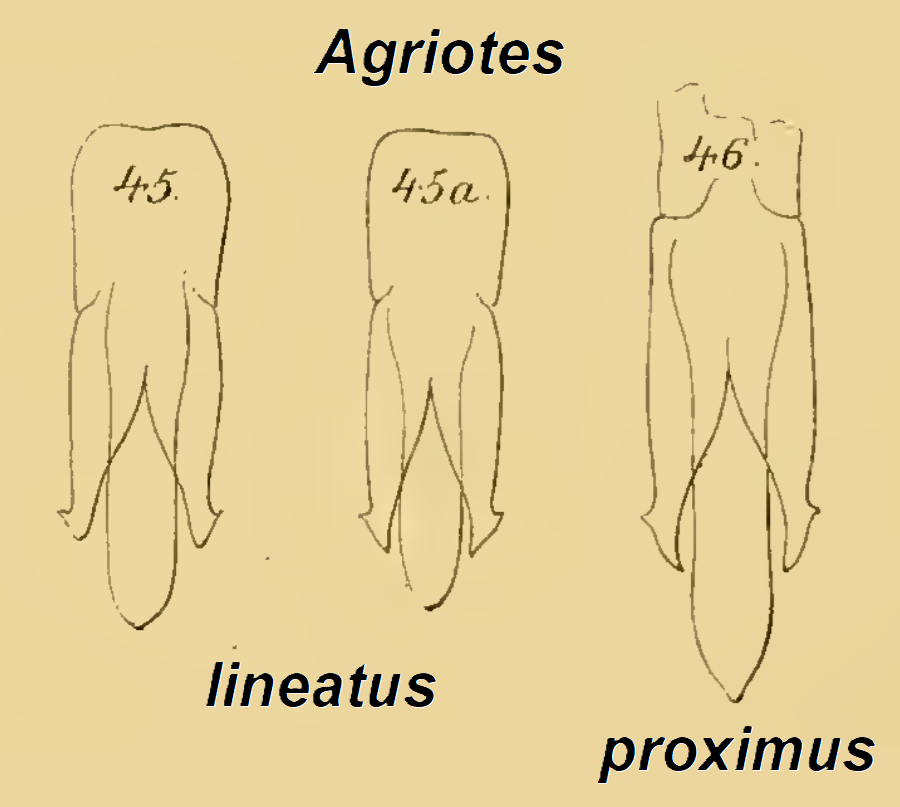
Original drawing by Otto Schwarz illustrating the male aedeagi of Agriotes lineatus (left and centre) and A. proximus (right)

The male aedeagus of Agriotes proximus is larger than that of A. lineatus. The shape of the parameres appears to be variable in both species. Some authors have described and illustrated differences in the hooks of the parameres between A. proximus and A. lineatus. However, these differences are not consistent and the descriptions can be contradictory between different authors. Other authors have not described or illustrated differences in the shape of the parameres, e.g. see the original drawings by Schwarz at the left.

The larval stages of Agriotes proximus are indistinguishable from those of A. lineatus. Further, studies of the DNA structure of the mitochondrial cytochrome c oxidase subunit I gene did not find any significant differences between A. proximus and A. lineatus.

== Distribution ==
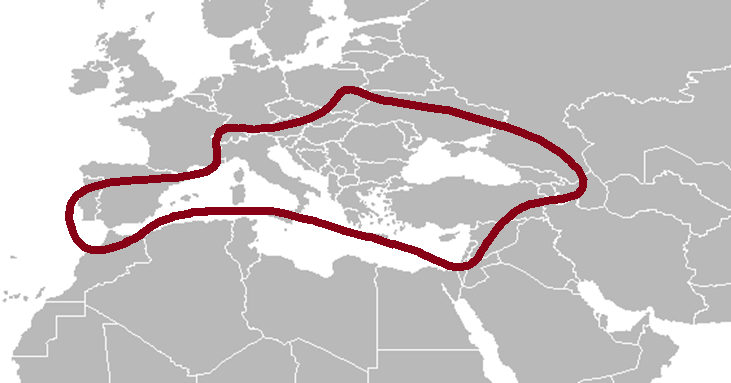
Distribution range of Agriotes proximus in Europe, western Asia and north-western Africa.

In the original description by Schwarz, the localities given for the distribution of Agriotes proximus were Hungary, Vienna (Austria), Italy, Serbia, Asia Minor (Turkey) and the Caucasus. Additional reports of this species are mainly from southern Europe, including from Portugal, Spain and Switzerland in the west, and Austria, Bosnia Herzegovina, Bulgaria, Greece, Macedonia, Moldova, Montenegro, Romania, Russia (southern European parts), Slovenia and Ukraine in the east. There are also a few records further north in eastern Europe, namely from Slovakia and Poland. In western Asia, A. proximus has been recorded from Armenia, Azerbaijan, Israel, Jordania, Lebanon, Syria and Turkey. In addition, it has been found in Morocco, north-western Africa.

== Biology and ecology ==
Very little is known about the biology and ecology of Agriotes proximus, apparently due to the difficulties of separating it from A. lineatus. In some ecological studies, both species are referred together as lineatus/proximus, suggesting that they share the same habitat. For example, in Austria, A. lineatus/proximus has been reported to inhabit areas of higher altitude (400-500 m ASL) characterized by lower temperatures, higher precipitation during the winter and acidic, humus-rich soils.

Initially, (E,E)-farnesyl acetate and neryl isovalerate had been identified as pheromone components of Agriotes proximus in Russia. However, both compounds do not attract any beetles in field trials. Subsequent analysis of the pheromone glands of A. proximus females from Portugal detected mainly geranyl octanoate with trace amounts of geranyl butanoate. In headspace analysis the butanoate/octanoate ratio was higher, 1:10. In field trials, a mixture of both compounds is highly attractive to A. proximus as well as to A. lineatus and is used for monitoring both species in Europe.

== Taxonomy ==
In his key to the palearctic species of the genus Agriotes, Otto Schwarz introduced the variety proximus under Agriotes lineatus. He added the note that this variety was regarded by Mr. von Kiesenwetter as belonging to Agriotes obscurus, apparently referring to Ernst August Hellmuth von Kiesenwetter. The description by Schwarz included the text: "Das Hsch. kaum oder deutlich breiter als lang, dicht oder sehr dicht und ziemlich stark punktirt, ..." [Pronotum slightly or clearly wider than long, densely or very densely and deeply punctured, ...] which is now considered to be the main diagnostic feature of the species Agriotes proximus.

While taxonomic lists and keys treat Agriotes proximus as a species separate from Agriotes lineatus, several authors have raised doubts about this separation and suggested that the slight morphological differences might "represent a stage of species diversification". The doubts on separating both species were based on:

- both species are attracted to the same pheromone,
- the larval stages of both species are indistinguishable,
- between both species, no significant differences have been found in the DNA structure of the mitochondrial cytochrome c oxidase subunit I gene.
- the morphological differences between both species are minor.

In 1911, Edmund Reitter published volume III of his work on German beetles which included the new species Agriotes lineatoides. However, during the same year he published a correction, stating that Agriotes lineatoides is the same as Agriotes proximus Schwarz.
