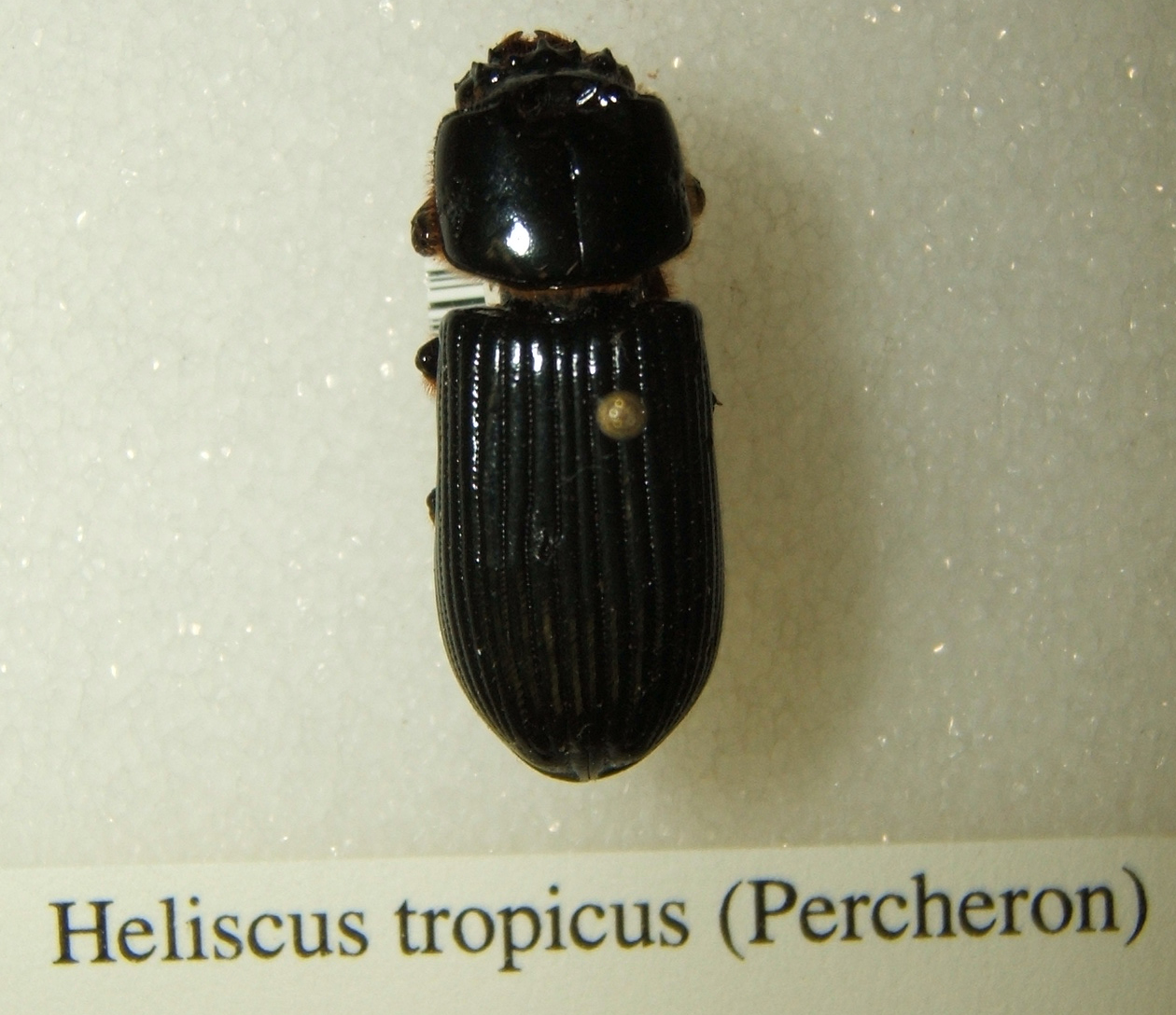

Scientific classification
- Domain: Eukaryota
- Kingdom: Animalia
- Phylum: Arthropoda
- Class: Insecta
- Order: Coleoptera
- Suborder: Polyphaga
- Infraorder: Scarabaeiformia
- Family: Passalidae
- Subfamily: Passalinae
- Tribe: Proculini
- Genus: Heliscus; Zang, 1906

Synonyms
- Coniger Zang, 1905; Hebicus Moreira, 1925; Soranus Kaup, 1871; Soronus Moreira, 1922

= Heliscus =

Genus of beetles

Heliscus is a genus of bess beetles in the family Passalidae. There are about 12 described species in Heliscus, found in Mexico, Central America, and South America.

== Species ==
These 12 species belong to the genus Heliscus:

- Heliscus championi (Bates, 1886) (Guatemala, Mexico)
- Heliscus decipiens (Kuwert, 1897) (Costa Rica)
- Heliscus eclipticus (Truqui, 1857) (Colombia, El Salvador, Guatemala, Mexico)
- Heliscus falsus (Kuwert, 1897) (Mexico)
- Heliscus moroni Reyes-Castillo, Asiain & Márquez, 2015 (Mexico)
- Heliscus rectangulatus (Luederwaldt, 1941) (Costa Rica)
- Heliscus ridiculus (Kuwert, 1891) (Guatemala, Mexico)
- Heliscus rotundicornis (Luederwaldt, 1941) (Costa Rica, Panama)
- Heliscus tikotepekensis (Kuwert, 1897) (Mexico)
- Heliscus tropicus (Percheron, 1835) (Mexico)
- Heliscus vazquezae Reyes-Castillo & Castillo, 1986 (Mexico)
- Heliscus yucatanus (Bates, 1886) (Guatemala, Mexico)
