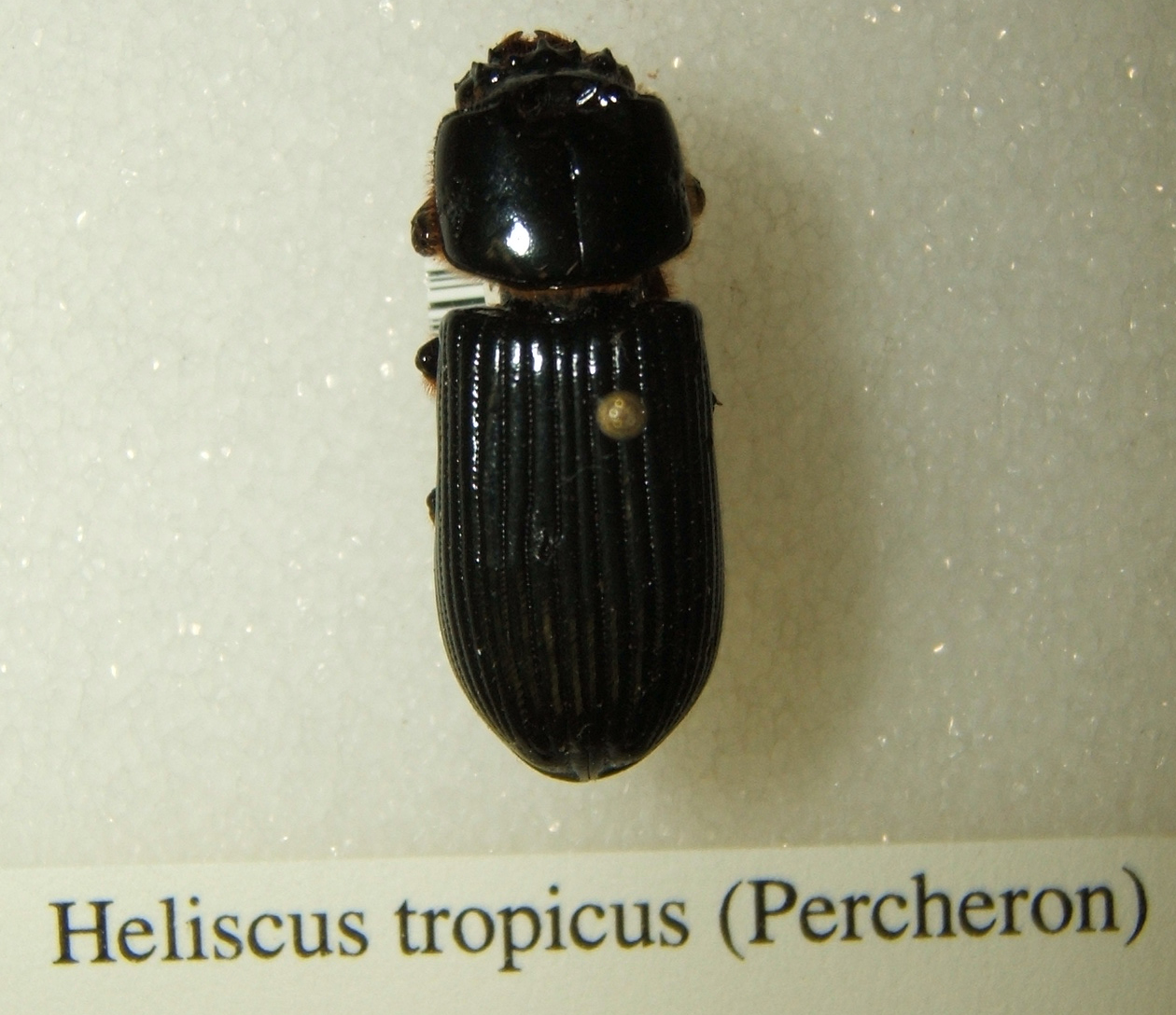
- Heliscus tropicus, adult

Scientific classification
- Domain: Eukaryota
- Kingdom: Animalia
- Phylum: Arthropoda
- Class: Insecta
- Order: Coleoptera
- Suborder: Polyphaga
- Infraorder: Scarabaeiformia
- Family: Passalidae
- Subfamily: Passalinae
- Tribe: Proculini
- Genus: Heliscus
- Species: H. tropicus

Binomial name
- Heliscus tropicus (Percheron)

= Heliscus tropicus =

Species of beetle

Heliscus tropicus is a Betsy beetle of the Family Passalidae.

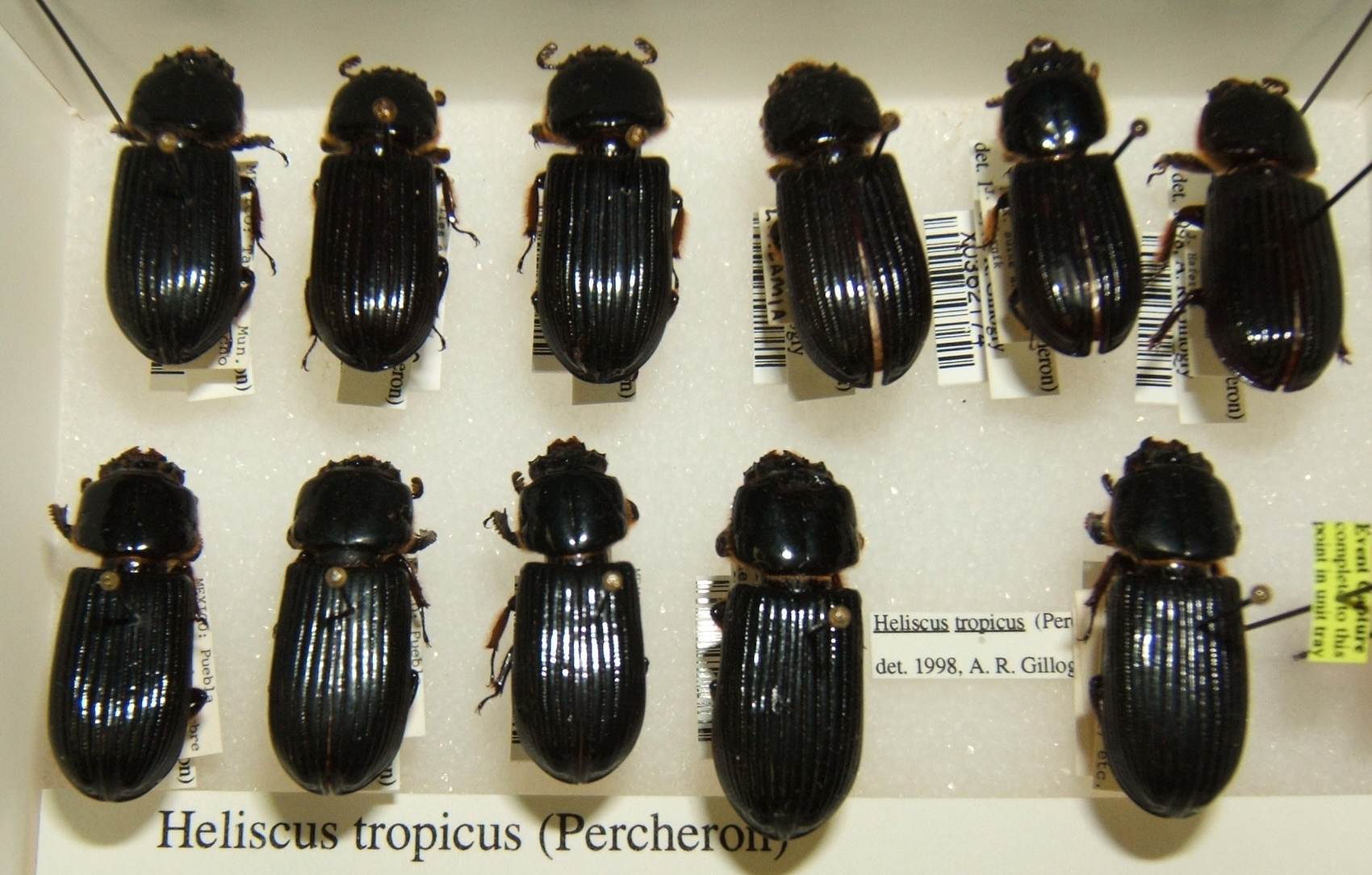
Heliscus tropicus variation
