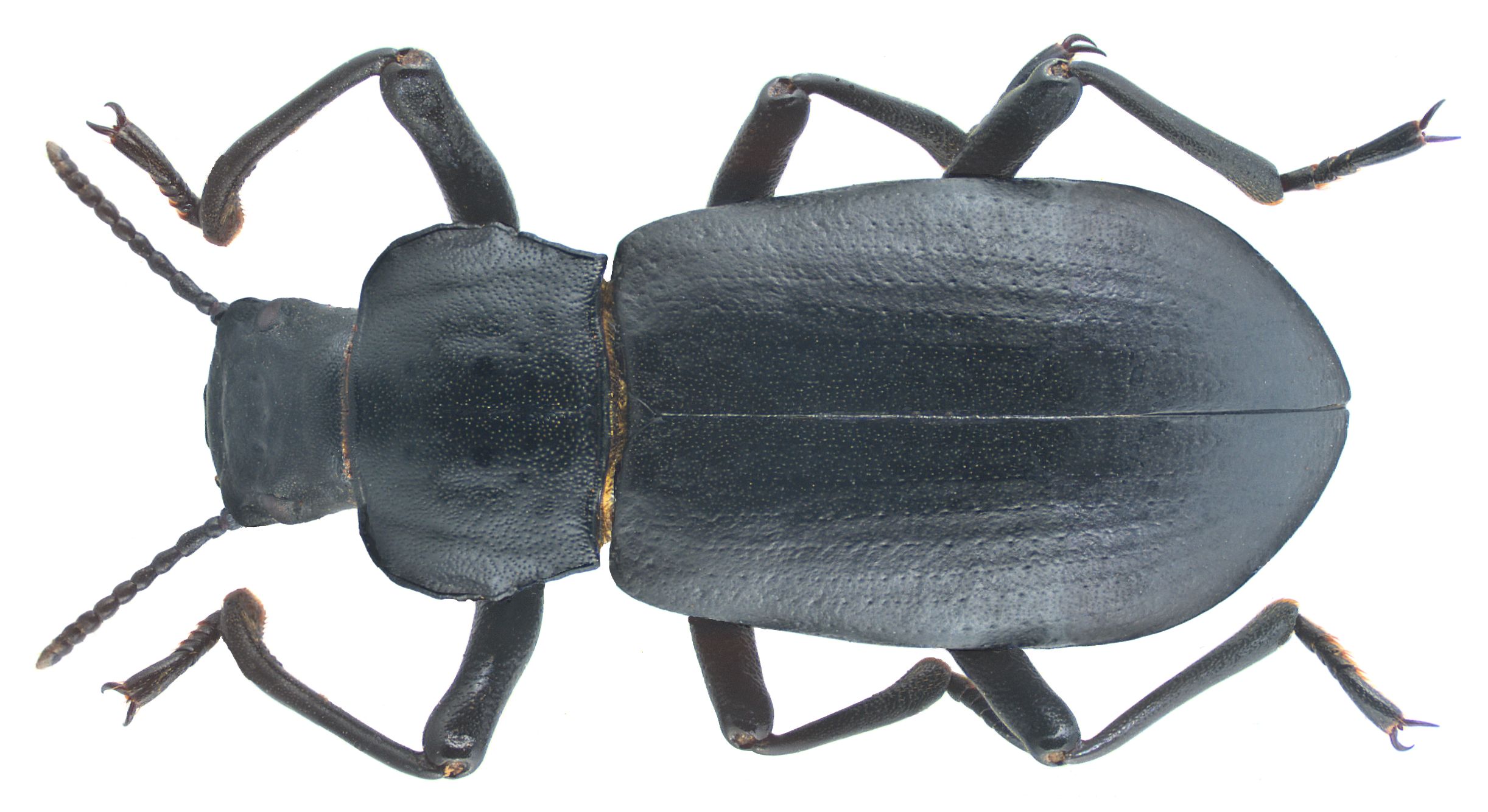
- Iphthiminus italicus

Scientific classification
- Domain: Eukaryota
- Kingdom: Animalia
- Phylum: Arthropoda
- Class: Insecta
- Order: Coleoptera
- Suborder: Polyphaga
- Infraorder: Cucujiformia
- Family: Tenebrionidae
- Genus: Iphthiminus
- Species: I. italicus

Binomial name
- Iphthiminus italicus (Truqui, 1857)

Synonyms
- Iphthimus italicus Truqui, 1857

= Iphthiminus italicus =

Species of beetle

Iphthiminus italicus is a species of darkling beetles, family Tenebrionidae.

== Subspecies ==
There are three subspecies:

- Iphthiminus italicus bellardi (Truqui, 1857)
- Iphthiminus italicus croaticus (Truqui, 1857)
- Iphthiminus italicus italicus (Truqui, 1857)

== Distribution ==
This species is present in Italy, Croatia, Hungary, Bosnia-Herzegovina, Albania, Greece, Cyprus, and Bulgaria.
