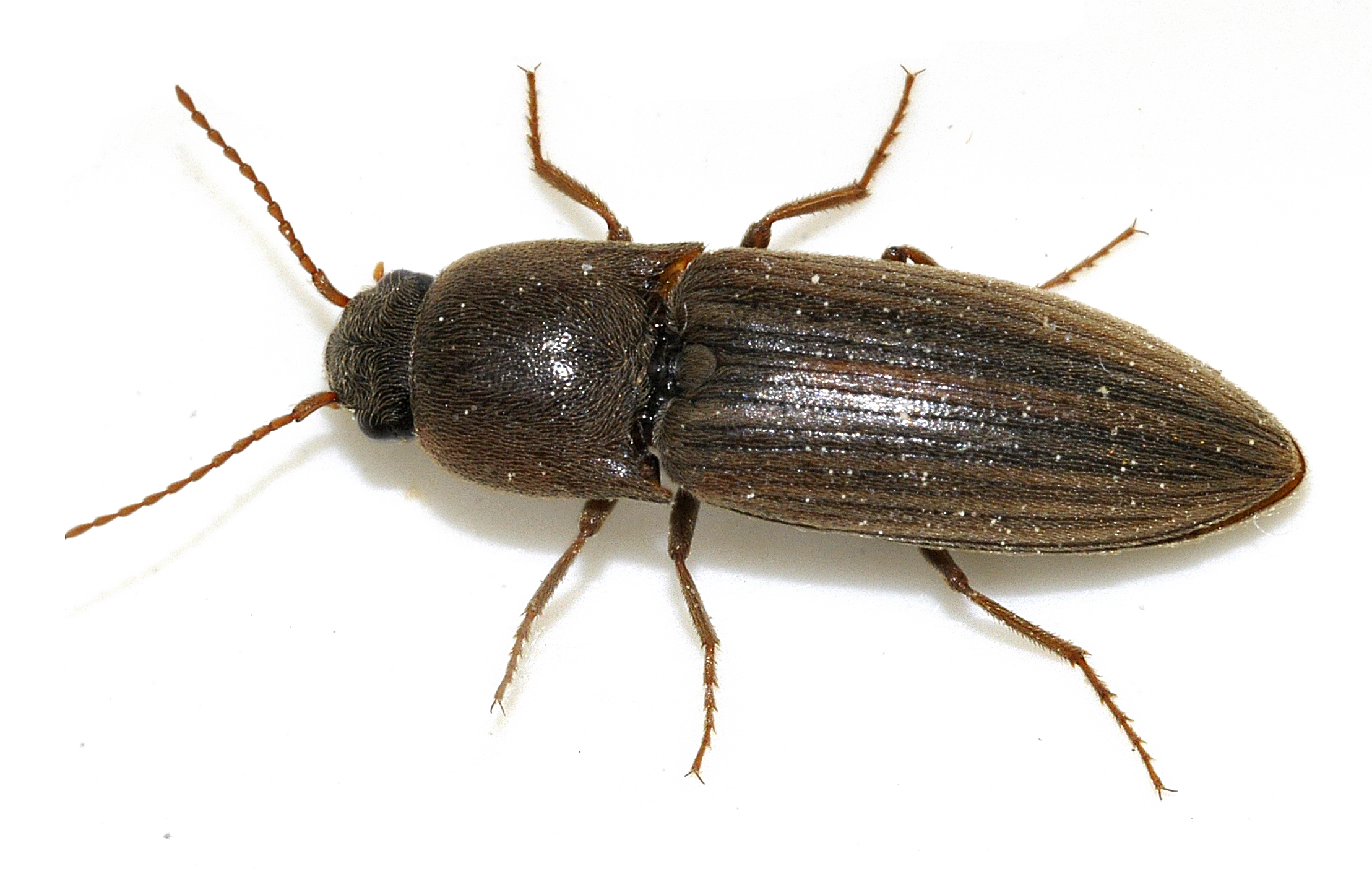

Scientific classification
- Kingdom: Animalia
- Phylum: Arthropoda
- Clade: Pancrustacea
- Class: Insecta
- Order: Coleoptera
- Suborder: Polyphaga
- Infraorder: Elateriformia
- Family: Elateridae
- Genus: Agriotes
- Species: A. lineatus

Binomial name
- Agriotes lineatus (Linnaeus 1767)

Synonyms
- Elater lineatus Linnaeus 1767; Elater striatus Fabricius 1775; Elater segetis Bierkander 1779; Elater suecicus Gmelin 1790

= Agriotes lineatus =

Species of beetle

Agriotes lineatus, commonly known as lined click beetle, is a species from the family Elateridae. It is common and native to most parts of Europe and also to parts of western Asia and the Near East. Further, it is invasive and has been introduced into two areas of North America, possibly also into Australia and other regions. In North America, it is found now in Atlantic Canada, western Canada (British Columbia) and Washington State (U.S.). The larvae (wireworms) are a significant agricultural pest for potatoes, maize/corn, strawberries and cereal crops, attacking the roots, tubers and seeds. For managing this pest in crop fields, an integrated approach is recommended in order to minimize the harmful environmental effect of pesticides. This involves monitoring the pest populations with pheromone or larval traps, and if damaging numbers are detected, non-pesticide management measures are applied. These include, for example, crop rotation or timing tillage and irrigation in a way so that the eggs and young larvae are desiccated in the top layer of the soil. The adult beetles of A. lineatus are brownish black and about 7.5–11 mm long. The species is named for the longitudinal stripes on the elytra. These stripes are usually more prominent in A. lineatus than in some other species of Agriotes, for example compared to A. sputator or A. modestus. The pronotum of A. lineatus is typically as long as or slightly longer than wide, in contrast to the extremely similar Agriotes proximus (also with very similar striped elytra), where the pronotum is usually slightly wider than long. Apart from the morphological similarities, A. lineatus and A. proximus have the same pheromones, the larval stages are indistinguishable and they share >99% similarity in the DNA sequence of the mitochondrial cytochrome c oxidase subunit I gene. Observations under semi-natural conditions in field cages suggested a life cycle of at least 3 years in central Germany with A. lineatus going through up to 12 larval stages.

== Distribution ==
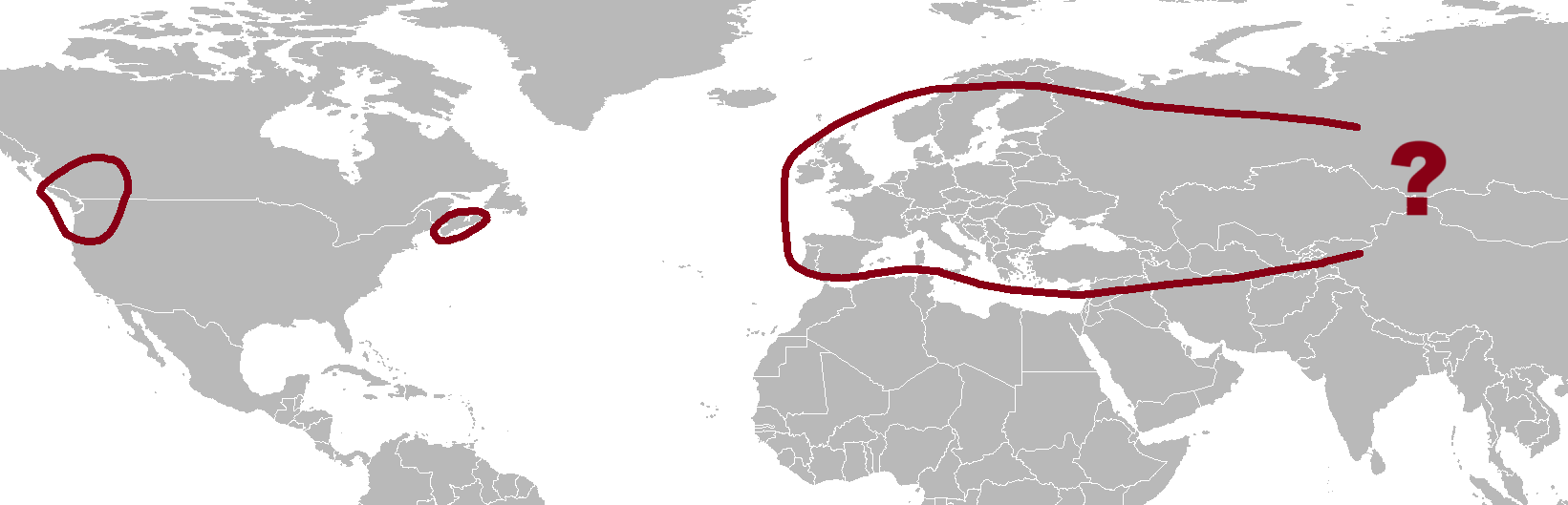
Distribution range of Agriotes lineatus in Europe, Asia and North America.

Agriotes lineatus was originally described from Germany. The type localities of the 3 species that are now regarded as synonyms of this species (see the taxobox above) are all in Sweden. A. lineatus is native and common in most parts of Europe and is also found in parts of western Asia and the Near East. In Europe, it seems to be only absent in the northern parts of Norway, Sweden, Finland and Russia. In western Asia, A. lineatus has been reported from Armenia, Azerbaijan, Georgia, Iran (northern parts), Kazakhstan, Kyrgyzstan, Lebanon, Syria, Turkmenistan and Turkey. The native distribution of A. lineatus further east is not clear and might include parts of Siberia, Mongolia and China. For example, A. lineatus has been recorded from China by native authors. However, these records were regarded as doubtful during a thorough review of the Agriotes species in China.

It is believed that Agriotes lineatus was accidentally introduced into western Canada around 1900 and has spread to neighboring parts of the U.S. In western Canada, it is now found on Vancouver Island and on the mainland in the southern parts of British Columbia. Further, it has been recorded from western parts In Washington State (U.S.A.) and might be also present in parts of Oregon. In addition, it has been introduced into Nova Scotia in eastern Canada.

Further, there are a number of unconfirmed and/or insufficiently documented records of Agriotes lineatus in several isolated locations around the world, including Massachusetts (eastern USA), far eastern Russia, South Australia and Western Australia. These reports have not been mentioned in recent publications on A. lineatus and it would appear desirable to have them confirmed by experts/taxonomists familiar with the very large and diverse genus of Agriotes, where species often show considerable variation in their coloration and morphology.

== Description ==
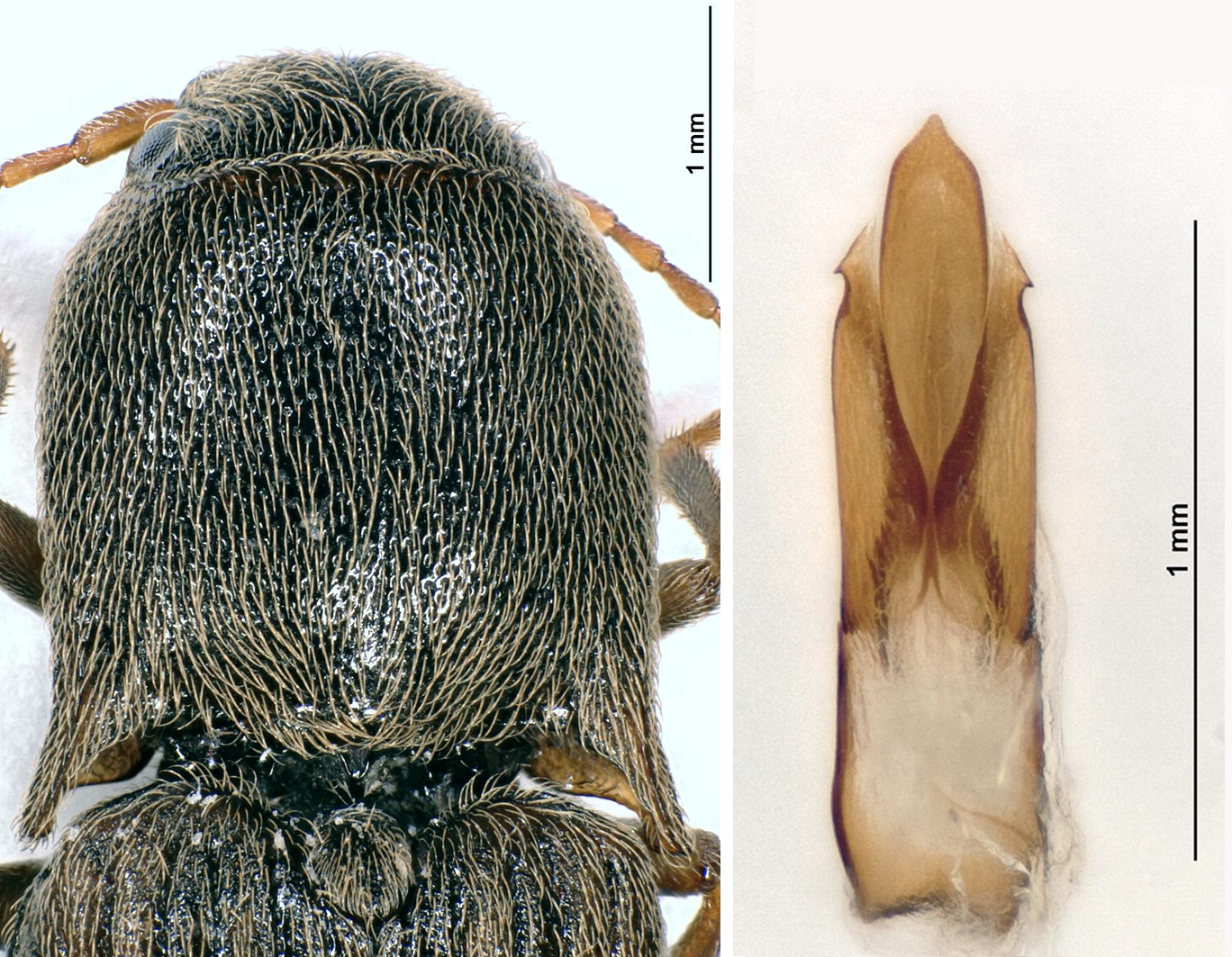
Agriotes lineatus – pronotum (left) and male aedeagus (right)

Agriotes lineatus adult beetles are typically 7.5–11 millimetres (0.30–0.43 in) in length. Most often, the body is brownish black in color. The species is named after the longitudinal stripes on its elytra that are alternating brown-black and lighter brown. These stripes are shared by a number of Agriotes species, but are especially prominent in A. lineatus. The pronotum is domed and usually as long as or slightly longer than wide, in contrast to the very similar Agriotes proximus, where the pronotum is usually slightly wider than long. The antennae and the parts of the legs distad from the tibiae are usually lighter brown. Identification by molecular method has also been studied and is usually feasible.

The most similar species to Agriotes lineatus is Agriotes proximus, also found in southern Europe and some neighboring parts of western Asia. Both species show minor morphological differences in the adult stage, but are attracted to the same pheromone, are indistinguishable in the larval stages, and no significant differences in their DNA structure has been detected. The mitochondrial cytochrome c oxidase subunit I gene of both species show >99% similarity. Apart from differences in the shape of the pronotum (see previous paragraph), the male aedeagus of A. lineatus is shorter and the hooks on the parameres are less sharp. In A. proximus, the paramere hooks are thinner and sharper and also less developed.

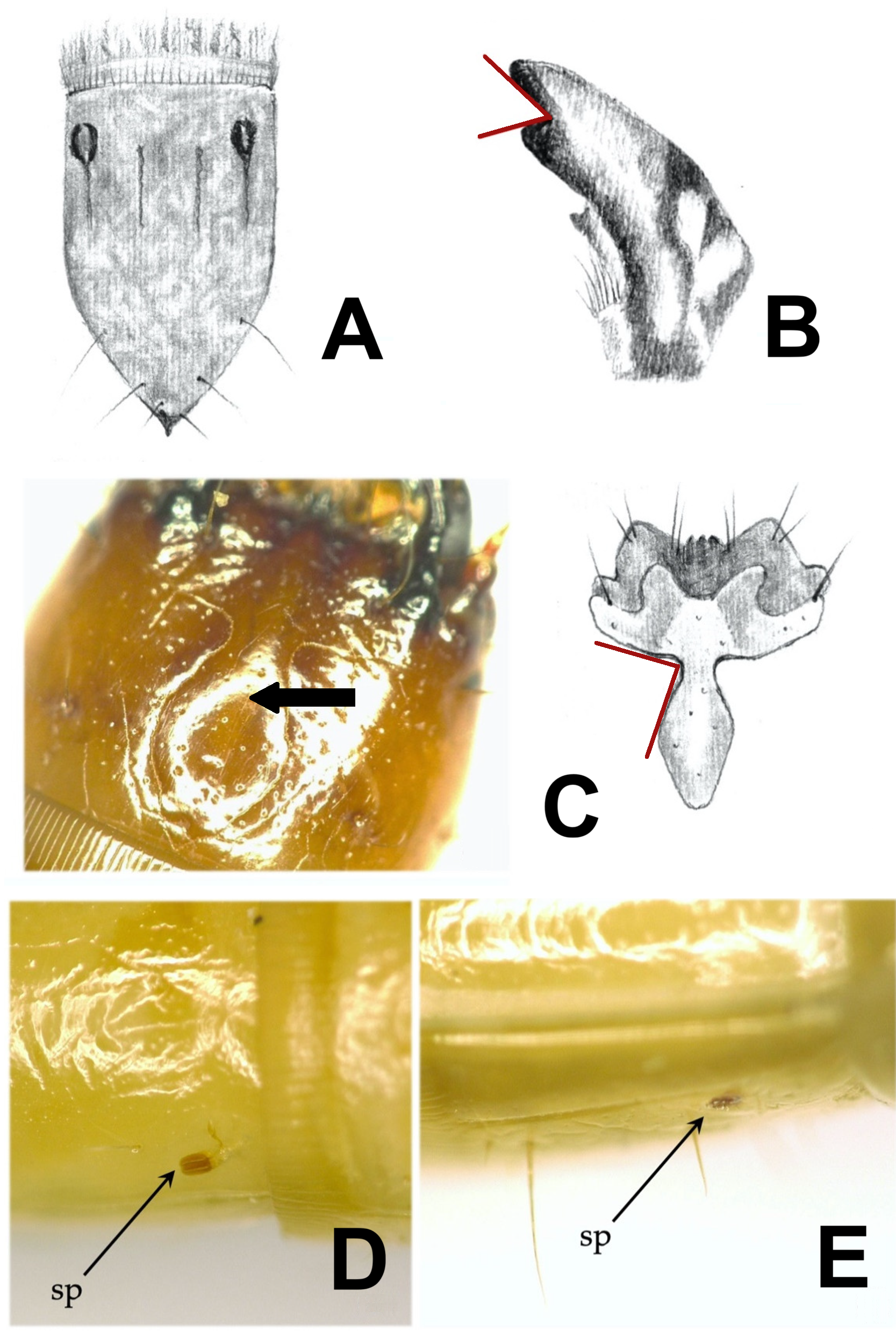
Features of Agriotes lineatus larvae – A: dorsal view of 9th abdominal segment with inner and outer longitudinal lines – B: right mandible with angle between tip and subapical tooth ≤90° – C: frontoclypeus, on left position on head (arrow), on right details with indicated angle (~ 90°) – D: lateral view of abdominal segment with spiracle (arrow) having a short, parallel-sided and subquadrate shape - E: dorso-lateral view of abdominal segment with spiracle (arrow)

The larval features of Agriotes lineatus are very similar to those of A. obscurus and larvae from both species are often difficult to separate. The shape of the abdominal spiracles has been described as most consistently different in both species, being shorter in A. lineatus with a parallel-sided and subquadrate shape. Other characteristic features of the larvae are:

- On the 9th abdominal segment, the inner longitudinal lines are as long as the outer ones and the terminal spike is as long as wide. The longitudinal lines are shorter than half the length of the 9th segment.
- On the right mandible, the angle between the apical and subapical teeth is ≤90°.
- On the frontoclypeus, the angle indicated in the illustration on the left (part C) is approximately 90°.

Further, there are no morphological differences between the larvae of A. lineatus and A. proximus.

== Biology ==
Like in some other species of Agriotes, the natural habitat of Agriotes lineatus appears to be non-farmed areas and grasslands, where the adult beetles feed on the leaves of grasses and the polyphagous larvae (wireworms) on plant roots, seeds and tubers. Crops are invaded from these grasslands. Over a 3-year observation period in British Columbia, a considerable stability was observed for A. lineatus populations in a heterogeneous landscape. In Austria A. lineatus larvae were mainly found at higher altitude (400–500 m ASL) characterized by lower temperatures, higher precipitation during the winter and acidic, humus-rich soils. Also in Croatia, the amount of humus in the soil was the best predictor for the abundance of A. lineatus.

The food plants that are most often cited for Agriotes lineatus larvae include, apart from roots of grasses, roots and seeds of cereals like maize or wheat, strawberry roots, as well as the tubers of sugar beet and potatoes. In spring, the adult beetles emerge and start laying eggs in the soil, close to the surface. In central Germany, egg laying starts in April and reaches a peak in May and June. The larvae emerge from the eggs after around 3 weeks and over the next 2 to 3 years go through about 12 instars before pupating in the soil. The pupal stage lasts around 3 to 4 weeks. Therefore, the total life cycle from egg to egg adds up to about 3 years in central Germany and is likely to be longer further north. Compared to some other Agriotes species, adults of A. lineatus have a longer life span and overwinter.

== Pheromones and traps ==
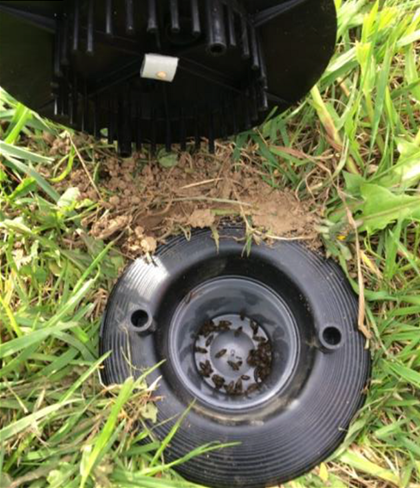
Vernon Pitfall Trap for catching Agriotes beetles. The lid of the trap has been opened and shows granules treated with the pheromone lure taped to the underside of the lid.

Agriotes lineatus females from Hungary produce mainly geranyl octanoate in their pheromone glands with trace amount for several other compounds. Other studies have also found the related geranyl butanoate in the pheromone glands. While geranyl octanoate alone attracts some A. lineatus in the field, the catches of males can be increased considerably by adding 10% or more geranyl butanoate to the lure. Usually, a bait of 10 mg geranyl octanoate mixed with 1 mg geranyl butanoate is used.

Pheromone traps have been commonly used for monitoring Agriotes lineatus populations. Several trap designs have been developed for the 10:1 mixture of geranyl octanoate and geranyl butanoate. The design now used most frequently in North America is the pheromone-baited Vernon Pitfall Trap®. This consist of a plastic container, about 10 cm high, inserted into the soil with the upper edge at the level of the soil surface. The lid is slightly elevated above the edge of the trap so that beetles can walk into the trap. The pheromone is applied as treated corn-cob granules on sticky tape attached to the underside of the lid.

During a study in central Germany with Agriotes lineatus, the 10:1 mixture of geranyl octanoate and geranyl butanoate had a rather short attraction range. Only half as many males released 10 m from the traps were recaptured compared to males released 2 m from the traps. The catches were again halved when males were released 20 m from the traps. It was concluded from these and from studies in North America that traps would need to be spaced 3 m apart if mass trapping was to be effective. Factors like wind direction also influenced the catches.

== Impact and management ==
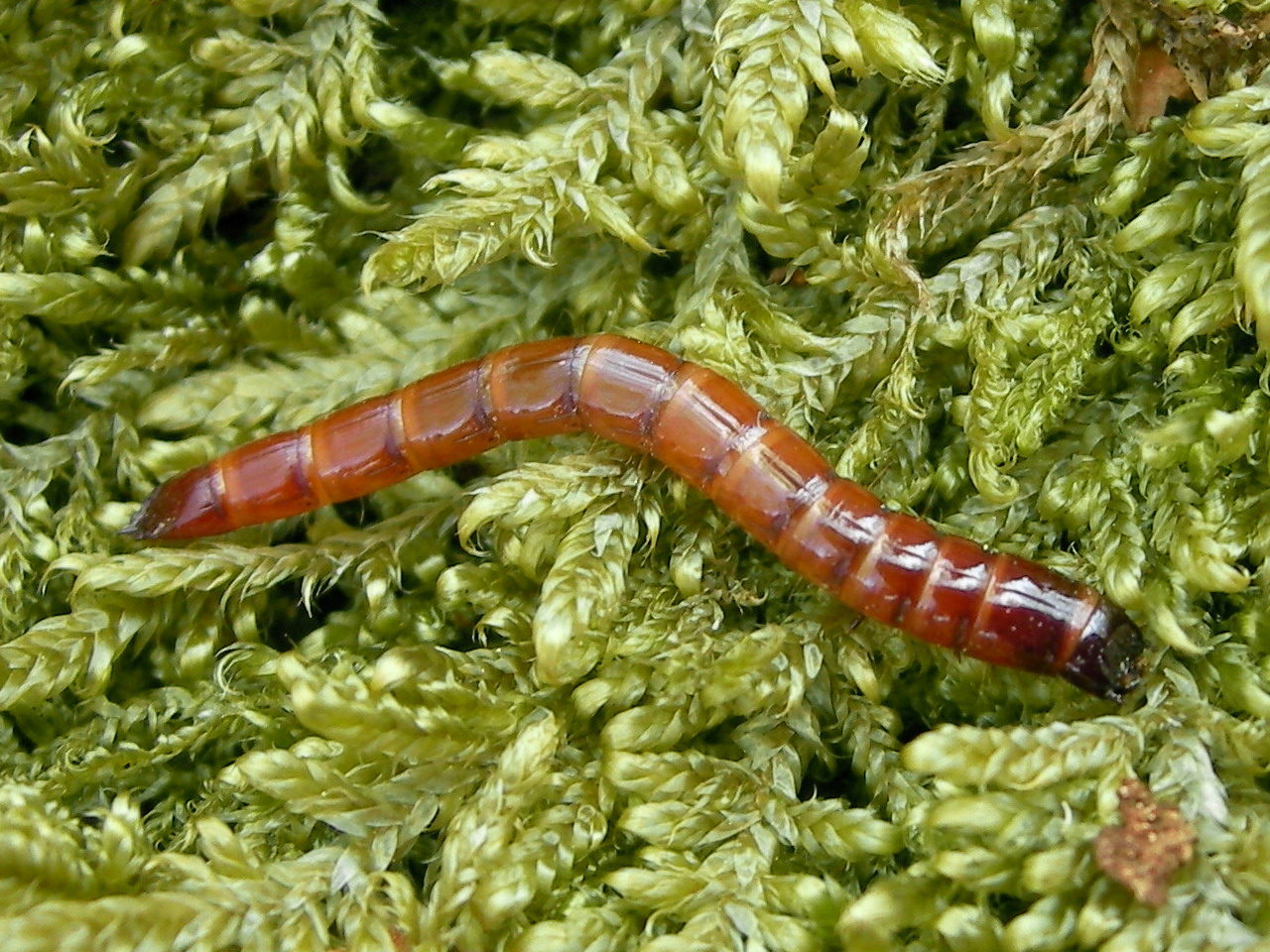
Larva (wireworm) of Agriotes lineatus.

Like other Agriotes species, the wireworms of Agriotes lineatus can cause significant crop damage, requiring control actions by the farmers. Until the 1990s, control has mainly relied on persistent organochlorine pesticides like lindane and aldrin. However, due to their harmful effects on the environment, alternatives have been and are still being developed. These include, for example, the planting of an alternative crop if damaging levels of wireworms are detected. In general, crop rotation helps to reduce wireworm populations, as do practices like timing tilling and irrigation in order to destroy eggs and young wireworm larvae in the top soil layer by desiccation. In addition, some potato varieties have shown tolerance to attacks by Agriotes species.

=== Crop damage ===
Crops are often attacked when Agriotes lineatus adult beetles and other Agriotes species invade agricultural fields from nearby non-farmed areas and grasslands. In Poland, during surveys with pheromone traps most A. lineatus beetles were caught in grasslands and sugar beet fields, but much fewer in potato and maize fields. However, in other parts of Europe and in western North America, also potatoes and cereals appear to be frequently attacked by A. lineatus wireworms. In Germany, potatoes are cited as a main crop infested by A. lineatus. Between 2018 and 2020, during surveys in potato fields in northern Germany, around 70% of the wireworms found were A. lineatus and only around 25% were A. obscurus. The infestation in potato fields was very high, with more than 90% of the potato tubers showing wireworm damage.

=== Pesticide use ===
After the banning of the persistent organochloride pesticides through the Stockholm Convention, organophosphate pesticides were used to control wireworms of Agriotes lineatus and other Agriotes species. These are less persistent but highly toxic to humans (see organophosphate poisoning) and they were subsequently replaced by neonicotinoid insecticides and other products like phenylpyrazole insecticides, often applied as seed dressings.

However, phenylpyrazole insecticides also affect the human health and neonicotinoids are very harmful to beneficial insects like honey bees. In addition, an EU directive, in effect since 2014, restricts the use of pesticides altogether and promotes the use of Integrated Pest Management (IPM). An IPM approach requires:

- to monitor pest populations and apply pesticide only when significant economic damage is predicted,
- to give priority to non-chemical control methods.

=== Mating disruption and mass trapping ===
Attempts have been made to use pheromones for controlling wireworms like Agriotes lineatus either by disrupting their reproduction or through mass trapping. Reducing the mating success of A. lineatus was achieved by broadcasting granules of dried corn-cobs treated with the pheromone mixture. This disrupts the natural behavior of male beetles, preventing them to find females. Trials in the UK in the early 2000s based on recapture rates suggested that a program to prevent A. lineatus males from mating would cost at least €165 per ha/year.

Eliminating or reducing A. lineatus populations by mass trapping was somewhat less successful and required a larger amount of resources. It consists of setting up a dense array of pheromone traps, typically spaced about 3 m apart. In Germany, trials with rather small plots (600 m^{2}) containing three YATLOR pheromone traps (one each for A. lineatus, A. obscurus and A. sputator), achieved a modest decline of wireworms captured in the soil, but no significant reduction in the damage to potato tubers. In western Canada, trapping in undisturbed grasslands with dense arrays of pitfall traps reduced the population of male A. lineatus beetles significantly and presumably also the number of mating pairs. In subsequent trials in field margins, the depletion rate was not statistically significant and depended on the temperature.

=== Biological control ===
Attempts to control Agriotes lineatus with entomopathogenic fungi and nematodes have achieved only limited success. In northern Germany, field trials in potato fields with Metarhizium brunneum achieved a moderate reduction of the potato damage. Factors that might have influenced the results included: 1) the experimental sites had a very high density of wireworms, mainly A. lineatus, 2) a relatively low fungal concentration was used, ~10^{10} conidia per ha as compared to ~10^{13} or ~10^{14} used in Canada against A. obscurus, 3) the potatoes had been treated with the fungicide MONCUT by seed dressing.

== Taxonomy ==
In his 12th edition of Systema Naturae, Linnaeus described Elater lineatus, the basionym of Agriotes lineatus. His definition was: "niger, elytris obscure lividis fusco sublineatis" [black, elytra dark with lead-colored brown stripes] and his description: "Corpus mediocre, fuscum. Antennae subferrugineae. Elytra obscure livida lineis & nigricantibus, versus suturam dorsalem positis." [Body of medium size, black-brown. Antennae dark red. Elytra dark with brownish lead-colored and black stripes, located in the direction of the dorsal suture.] The locality was given as Germany as per "D. Schreber", probably referring to Johann Christian Daniel von Schreber who might have collected this insect. A number of synonym names have been published for this species. Apart from the basionym, these include:

1. Elater striatus Fabricius 1775 – In his work Systema Entomologiae, Fabricius introduced the name Elater striatus for a species from Sweden with a short definition: "niger, elytris fuscis, lineatis" [black, elytra black-brown, striped] and the description: "Medius. Caput et thorax obscure nigra. Elytra fusca, lineis quatuor pallidis, ad apicem coeuntibus. Antennae ferrugineae. Pedes fusci." [Medium size, head and thorax dark black, elytra dark brown with 4 lighter stripes which merge near the tip. Antennae dark red, legs dark brown.] Apart from this synonomy, the name Elater striatus has been already used by Linnaeus, also in 1767, one page before his description of Elater lineatus and therefore the name was unavailable to Fabricius. Elater striatus Linnaeus 1767 is now regarded as a synonym of Elater porcatus Linnaeus 1767, the basionym of Chalcolepidius porcatus.
2. Elater segetis Bierkander 1779 – This species was described from Sweden as "Hela kroppen svart. Antennerne bruna, så långa som brøstet. Skalringarne hafva långs efter svarta och bruna linier. Føtterne svarta, men ytterste lederne brune." [Whole body black. Antennae brown, as long as the thorax. "Skalringarne" (elytra?) along their length with black and brown lines. Legs black, but the distal parts brown.] It was emphasized that the larvae are harmful rootworms infesting wheat, rye, maize and oat.
3. Elater suecicus Gmelin 1790 – In an expanded edition of the Systema Naturae by Linnaeus, Gmelin described many new genera and species, including Elater suecicus as "niger, elytris lineatis fuscis" [black, elytra with dark brown stripes]. The species was found on grasses in Sweden.

Agriotes proximus Schwarz 1891 was described as a variety of Agriotes lineatus (Linnaeus 1767), but is listed as a separate species in most taxonomic keys. Both species are extremely similar, with small differences in the shape of the pronotum and the male genitalia. In addition, both have the same pheromone and molecular studies failed to show significant differences. For example, the mitochondrial cytochrome c oxidase subunit I gene of both species show >99% similarity, casting doubt on this taxonomic separation.
