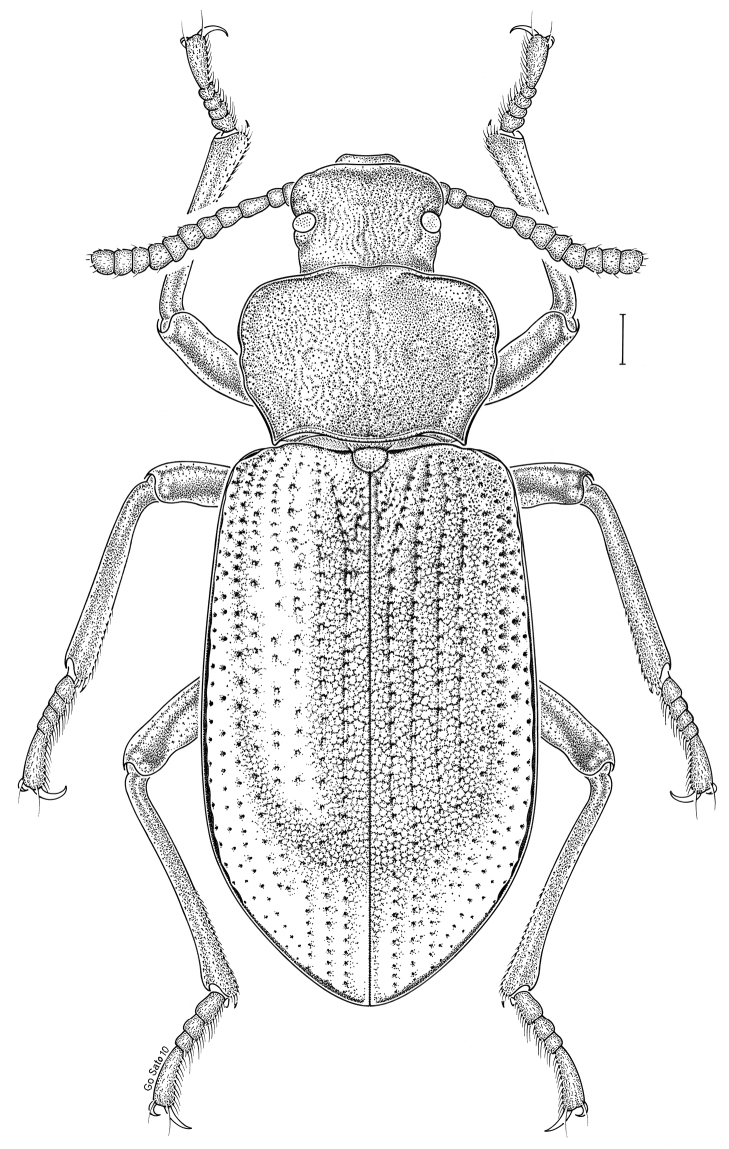
- Iphthiminus serratus

Conservation status
- Secure (NatureServe)

Scientific classification
- Domain: Eukaryota
- Kingdom: Animalia
- Phylum: Arthropoda
- Class: Insecta
- Order: Coleoptera
- Suborder: Polyphaga
- Infraorder: Cucujiformia
- Family: Tenebrionidae
- Genus: Iphthiminus
- Species: I. serratus

Binomial name
- Iphthiminus serratus (Mannerheim, 1843)

Synonyms
- Nyctobates serratus (Mannerheim, 1843); Iphthiminus salebrosus (Casey, 1924); Nyctobates sublaevis (Bland, 1865)

= Iphthiminus serratus =

Species of beetle

Iphthiminus serratus is a species of darkling beetles in the subfamily Tenebrioninae. Originally I. sublaevis and I. salebrosus were considered subspecies of I. serratus due to minor geographical variation, but this variation is gradual and they are now considered synonyms.

== Appearance ==
They are differentiated from the other species of Iphthiminus as they have only a moderately wrinkled prothorax with moderate serrations of the lateral edges.

== Distribution ==
This species is present primarily in the western North America, including California, Idaho, Nebraska, Nevada, New Mexico, Oregon, Washington, Wyoming, and British Columbia.

== Diet and habitat ==
Like other darkling beetles in the genus Iphthiminus, I. serratus is associated with rotting coniferous logs, especially pine wood. When raised in captivity by the Invertebrate Dude, I. serratus was observed eating chick feed and rotting wood.
