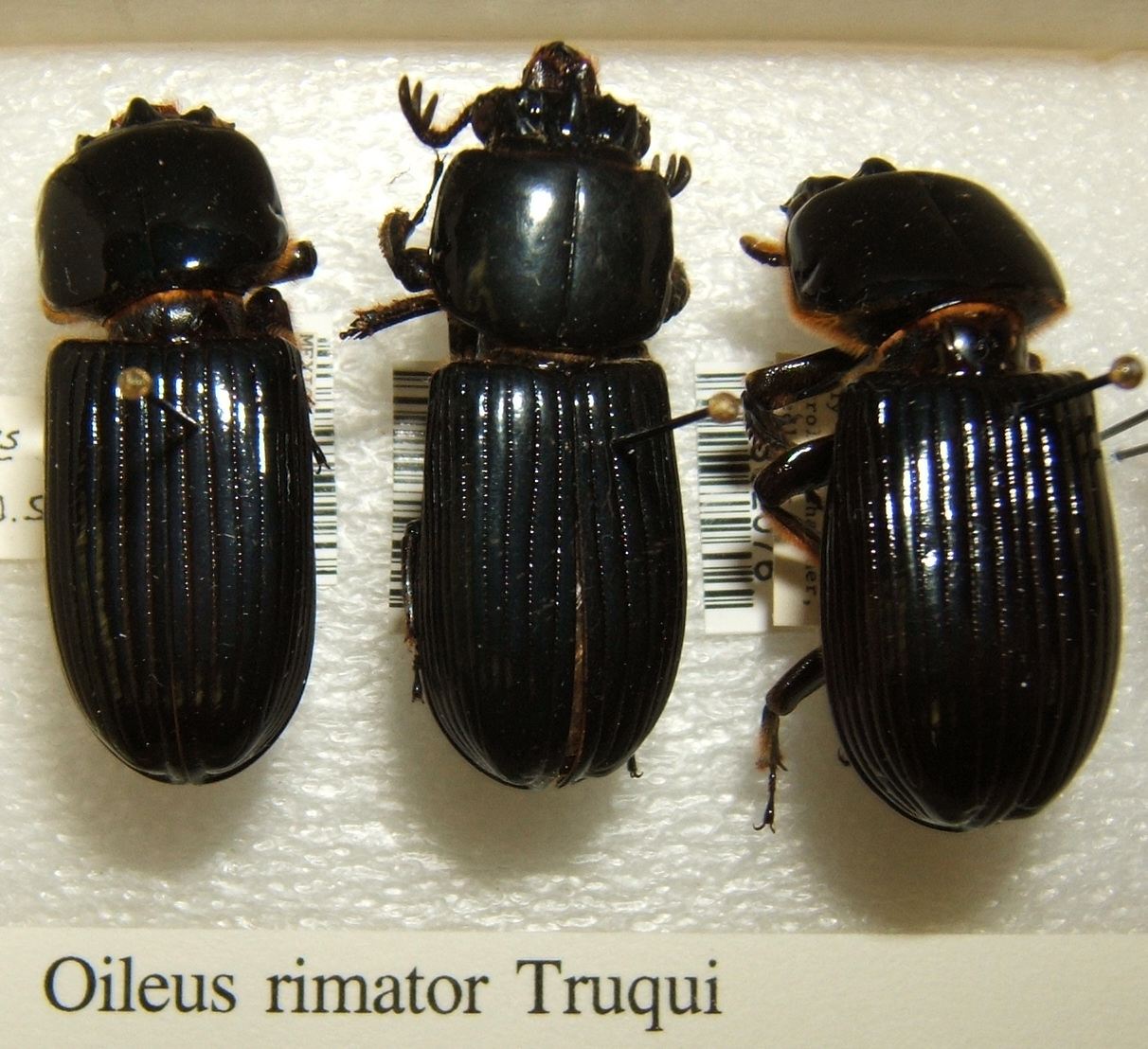
- Oileus rimator, adults

Scientific classification
- Kingdom: Animalia
- Phylum: Arthropoda
- Class: Insecta
- Order: Coleoptera
- Suborder: Polyphaga
- Infraorder: Scarabaeiformia
- Family: Passalidae
- Tribe: Proculini
- Genus: Oileus; Kaup, 1869

Synonyms
- Rimor Kaup, 1871

= Oileus (beetle) =

Genus of beetles

Oileus is a genus of beetles in the family Passalidae. The genus is distributed in Meso-America, from Mexico to Panama, primarily in montane areas.

== Description ==
Adult Oileus measure 26–47 mm (1.0–1.9 in) in length. The genus contains both macropterous and brachypterous species.

== Species ==
There are eight recognized species:

- Oileus astecus (Truqui, 1857)
- Oileus bezai Ariza-Marín, Jiménez-Ferbans & Reyes-Castillo, 2024
- Oileus bifidus (Zang, 1905)
- Oileus gasparilomi Cano & Schuster, 2012
- Oileus heros (Truqui, 1857)
- Oileus nonstriatus (Dibb, 1936)
- Oileus rimator (Truqui, 1857)
- Oileus sargi (Kaup, 1871)
