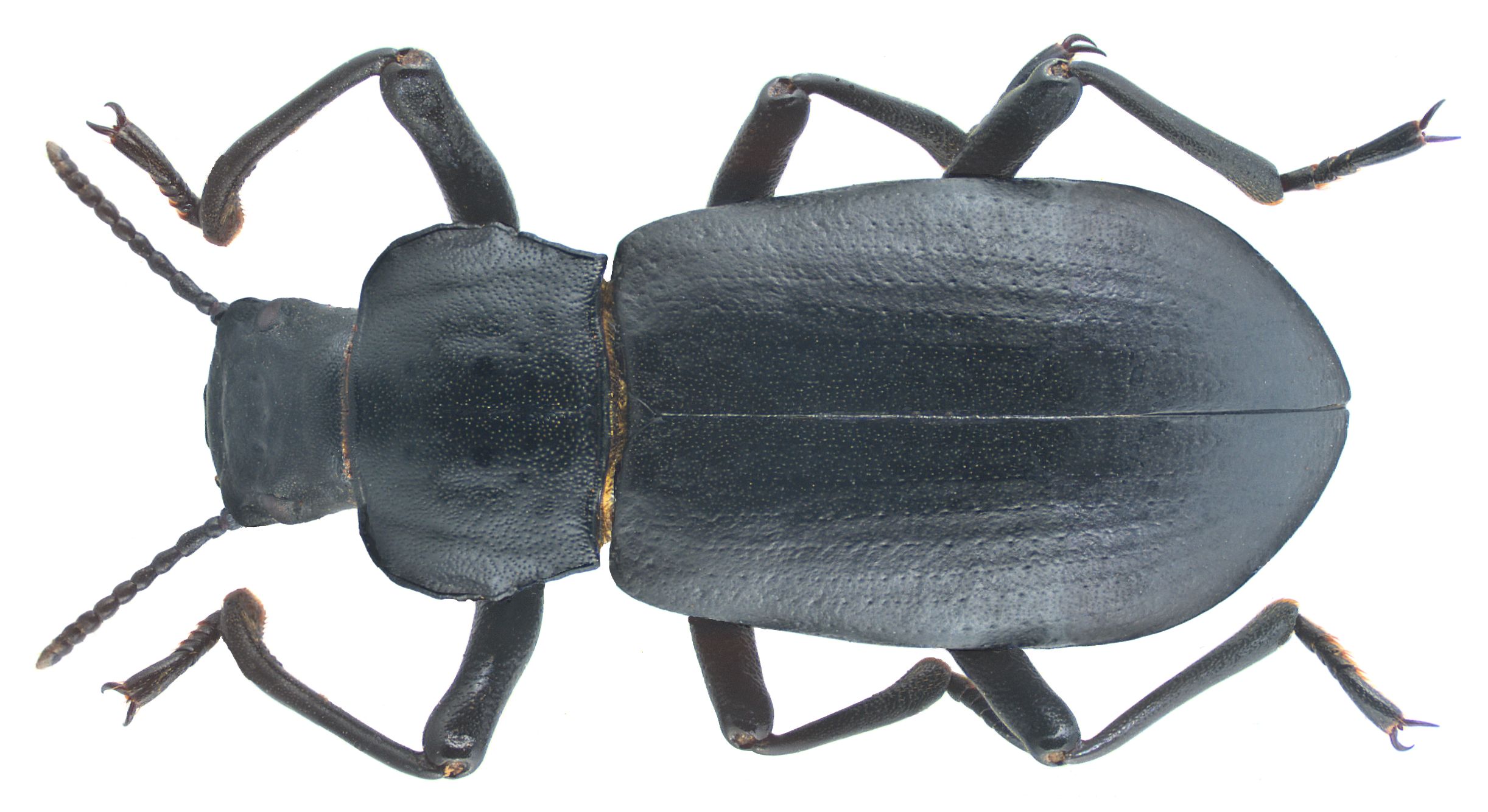
- Iphthiminus italicus

Scientific classification
- Kingdom: Animalia
- Phylum: Arthropoda
- Clade: Pancrustacea
- Class: Insecta
- Order: Coleoptera
- Suborder: Polyphaga
- Infraorder: Cucujiformia
- Family: Tenebrionidae
- Subfamily: Tenebrioninae
- Genus: Iphthiminus; Spilman, 1973

= Iphthiminus =

Genus of beetles

Iphthiminus is a genus of darkling beetles in the subfamily Tenebrioninae.

== Species ==
Species within this genus include:

- Iphthiminus italicus (Truqui, 1857)
- Iphthiminus lewisii (Horn, 1870)
- Iphthiminus opacus (LeConte, 1866)
- Iphthiminus serratus (Mannerheim, 1843)

== Habitat and Diet ==
Ipthiminus are generally found under bark, especially in the rotting logs of coniferous trees such as the Ponderosa Pine. Ipthiminus has been seen eating subcortical fungus, fruiting fungus such as Trichaptum, and rotting wood itself in lavatory conditions.
