= Eugenio Truqui =

Italian entomologist

Eugenio Truqui (born ? in Turin - died May 1860, in Rio de Janeiro), also known as Eugen Truqui, was an Italian entomologist who specialised in Coleoptera.

His insect collections from Brazil, Mexico, Syria and Cyprus are held by Museo Regionale di Scienze Naturali di Torino.

== Biography ==
Professor Eugenio Truqui served his country for eighteen years as a Consul, especially in Cyprus, Syria and in Mexico, before being transferred in 1857 to Brazil.

He arrived in Rio de Janeiro on March 1, 1857, with the title of Regent of the General Consulate of the Kingdom of Sardinia. In 1860 he contracted Yellow fever that with Cholera was claiming victims in the European colonies and decimated the population of Brazil. Many European families and European consuls abandoned Rio de Janeiro, but he refused to leave his service. He died in Rio de Janeiro in May 1860.

== The Entomologist ==
During his stay in Cyprus attached to the Consulate of the Kingdom of Sardinia in Cyprus and Syria he wrote a paper entitled Anthicini insulae Cypri et Syriae, published by the Accademia delle Scienze di Torino.

Moreover he produced the first significant collection of Carabidae from the island of Cyprus. After his death, this collection was examined by the eminent coleopterist Flaminio Baudi di Selve, with the descriptions of several new species.

With Flaminio Baudi di Selve he had previously edited Studi Entomologici, Stamperia degli Artisti Tipografi, Torino, Italy.

He identified the species of darkling beetles Iphthiminus italicus (Truqui 1857).

== Works ==
- Eugenio Truqui - Amphicoma et Eulasia : insectorum et coleopterorum genera – Torino, Excudebant Sodales Typographi, 1847
- Eugenio Truqui - Anthicini insulae Cypri et Syriae – Torino, Officina Regia, 1855.
- Eugenio Truqui - Illustrazione di una lapide fenicia: trovata fra le rovine dell' antica Chition, e cenni su questa città – Torino, Stamperia sociale degli artisti A. Pons e C., 1852.
- Flaminio Baudi di Selve; Eugenio Truqui; Antoine Joseph Jean Solier; Camillo Rondani; Carlo Giuseppe Gené - Studi entomologici – Torino, Stamperia degli artisti tipografi, 1848.

== See also ==
- Baudi, F. 1873 Coleopterorum messis in insula Cypro et Asia Minore ab Eugenio Truqui congregatae recensitio: de Europaeis notis quibusdam additis Berliner Entomologische Zeitschrift part 5
