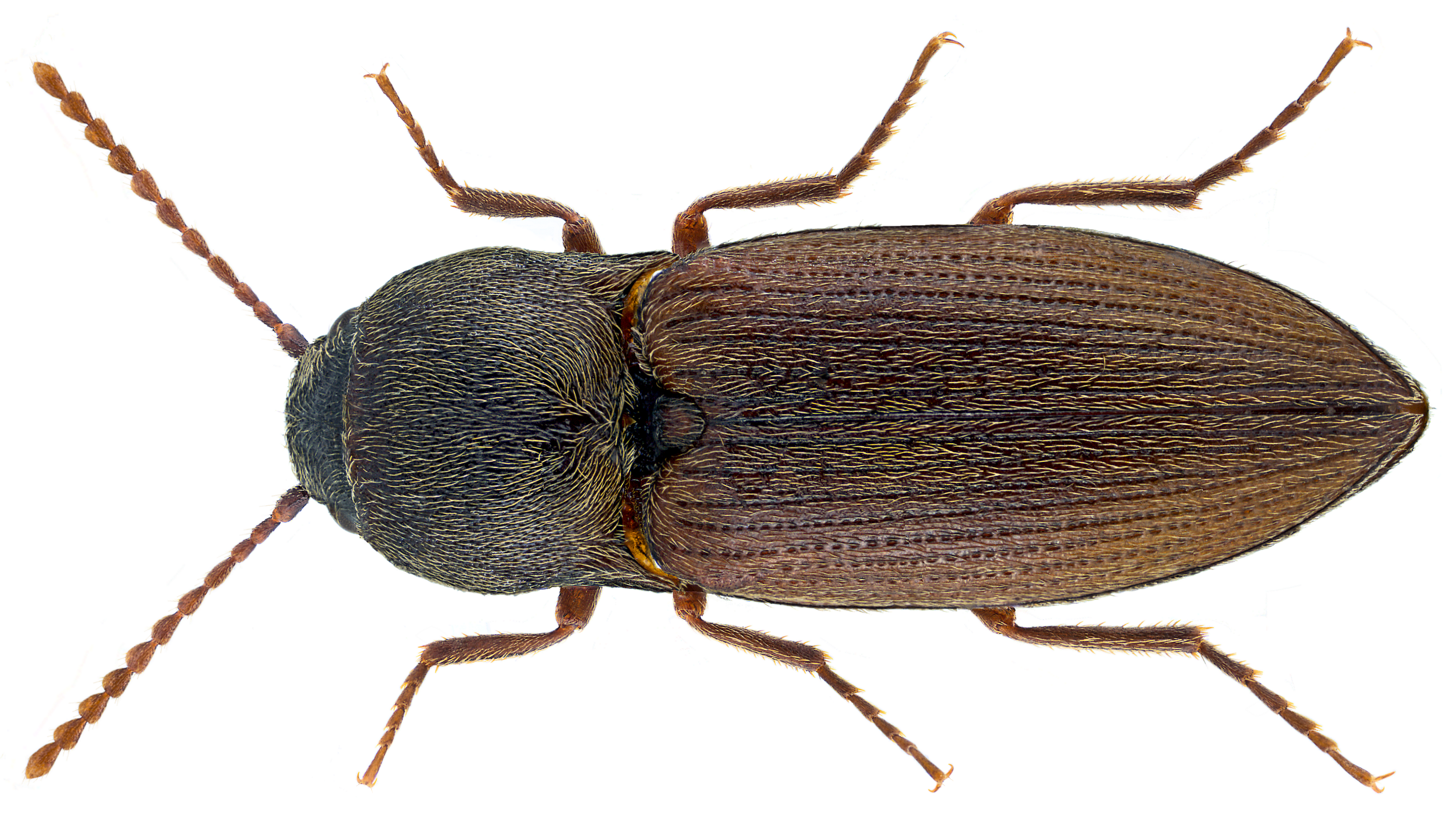

Scientific classification
- Kingdom: Animalia
- Phylum: Arthropoda
- Clade: Pancrustacea
- Class: Insecta
- Order: Coleoptera
- Suborder: Polyphaga
- Infraorder: Elateriformia
- Family: Elateridae
- Genus: Agriotes
- Species: A. obscurus

Binomial name
- Agriotes obscurus (Linnaeus 1758)

Synonyms
- Elater obscurus Linnaeus 1758; Elater badius Müller 1764; Elater obtusus De Geer 1774; Elater variabilis Fabricius 1792; Elater hirtellus Herbst 1806

= Agriotes obscurus =

Species of beetle

Agriotes obscurus, commonly known as dusky wireworm or obscure click beetle, is a species from the family Elateridae that is native and widely distributed in central and northern Europe. It is also present in parts of northern Asia and has been accidentally introduced into western Canada around 1900. It is now established in British Columbia (Canada) and Washington State (U.S.A.), with the risk of spreading to other parts of North America. The larvae (wireworms) are agricultural pests and attack the tubers, seeds and roots of numerous crops like potatoes, beets, cereals, sunflower, vegetables and ornamentals. The larvae also feed on the roots of some grasses and various other plants. For example, in Austria A. obscurus larvae often feed on the roots of common yarrow (Achillea millefolium). For minimizing the harmful effects of pesticides on the environment, an integrated approach is recommended for managing A. obscurus in agricultural fields. Primarily, this involves monitoring the pest populations with pheromone or larval traps. If damaging numbers are detected, non-pesticide management measures should be preferred like crop rotation or timing tillage and irrigation in a way so that the eggs and young larvae are desiccated in the top layer of the soil. The adult beetles are dark brown to black and about 8-10 mm long. They can be distinguished from other species of Agriotes by the morphology of the pronotum, the longitudinal ridges on the elytra and their coloration. The general color of the adult beetle is dark brown to black, but the elytra, legs and antennae are often reddish-brown. Most parts of the body are covered with greyish hair. The antennae are slightly longer than head and pronotum combined. In cooler regions, the life cycle is completed in four years, but it can be shorter under warmer conditions and may be as short as two years. Egg laying starts in spring and the larvae go through 10 or more instars, depending on the environmental conditions.

== Distribution ==
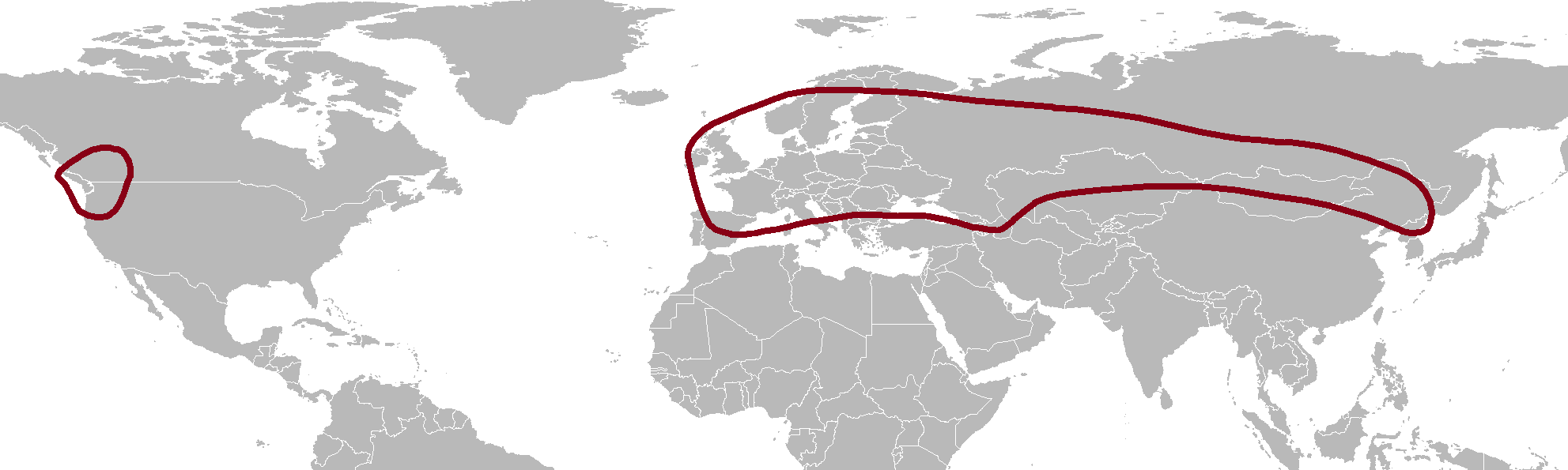
Distribution range of Agriotes obscurus in Europe, Asia and North America.

Linnaeus gave "Europe" as habitat when he described Elater obscurus, the basionym of Agriotes obscurus. The type localities given for three other species which are now regarded as synonyms of this species (see the taxobox above) are: Denmark, Germany and Europe. A. obscurus is native to Europe and to parts of Asia. It is most common in central Europe like France, regions in and around the Alps, the U.K., Germany, Poland, Scandinavia and the Baltic states. In Europe, the total distribution range extends from parts of Spain and Italy in the south-west to the U.K., Norway and Finland in the north, to Ukraine and western Russia in the east and to Serbia, Montenegro, Bulgaria and Romania in the south-east. In Asia, it is found in some northern and central parts including Armenia, Azerbaijan, northern Kazakhstan, parts of Siberia, northern Mongolia, northern China and Korea.

Around 1900, Agriotes obscurus was accidentally introduced into western Canada, possibly with the soil of hop plants. In the province of British Colombia it is now wide-spread and common on Vancouver Island and in Fraser Valley on the Canadian mainland. It is also spreading into neighboring parts of the U.S.A. During a survey in 1997, A. obscurus was recorded in Washington State, just across the border from British Colombia. Further surveys in 2004 and 2005 indicated that A. obscurus was widely distributed in some western parts of Washington State with indications of its presence also in parts of Oregon. Surveys between 2017 and 2019 in Canada found A. obscurus in most southern parts of British Colombia.

== Description ==
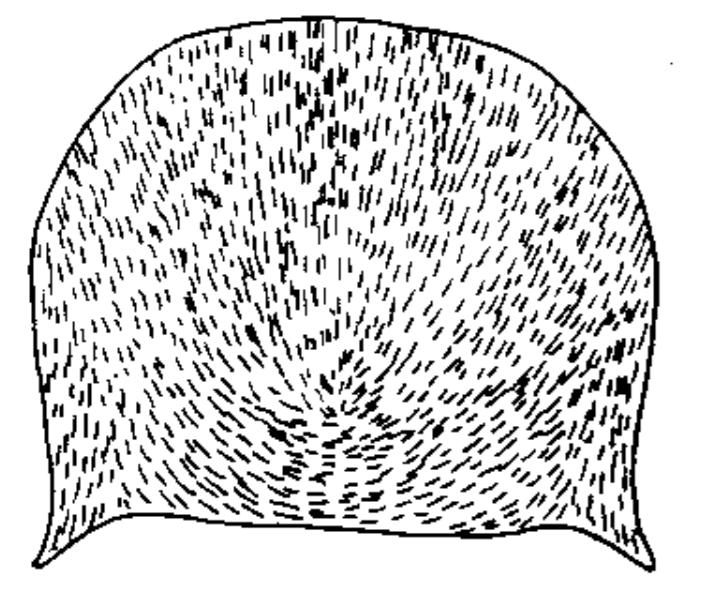
Agriotes obscurus - shape of pronotum and arrangement of hairs.

Compared to other Agriotes species, the adult beetles of Agriotes obscurus are of medium size and 7–10 mm long. They can be identified by the following combination of features:

- Pronotum clearly wider than long, its sides strongly curved.
- The whole thorax strongly and densely punctured.
- Elytra relatively short with narrow longitudinal ridges arranged in pairs, the distal part wedge-shaped.
- Color dark brown to black with elytra, legs and antennae often lighter. However, the whole insect may also be of the same color.
- The antennae are slightly longer than head and thorax combined.

Agriotes obscurus is similar to A. sputator and to A. lineatus, two other common species in Europe which are also agricultural pests, but in both species the pronotum is slightly longer than wide. Compared to A. obscurus, the pronotum of A. sputator is also wider near the head and has less curved, almost parallel sides. A. lineatus can be easily separated from A. obscurus and A. sputator by its striped elytra.

Molecular identification of A. obscurus adults and larvae is also possible. The morphological features of A. obscurus larvae are very similar to those of A. lineatus and it is difficult to separate the larvae of both species. The shape of the abdominal spiracles has been described as most consistently different in both species, being longer than wide and narrowing posteriorly in A. obscurus.

== Biology ==
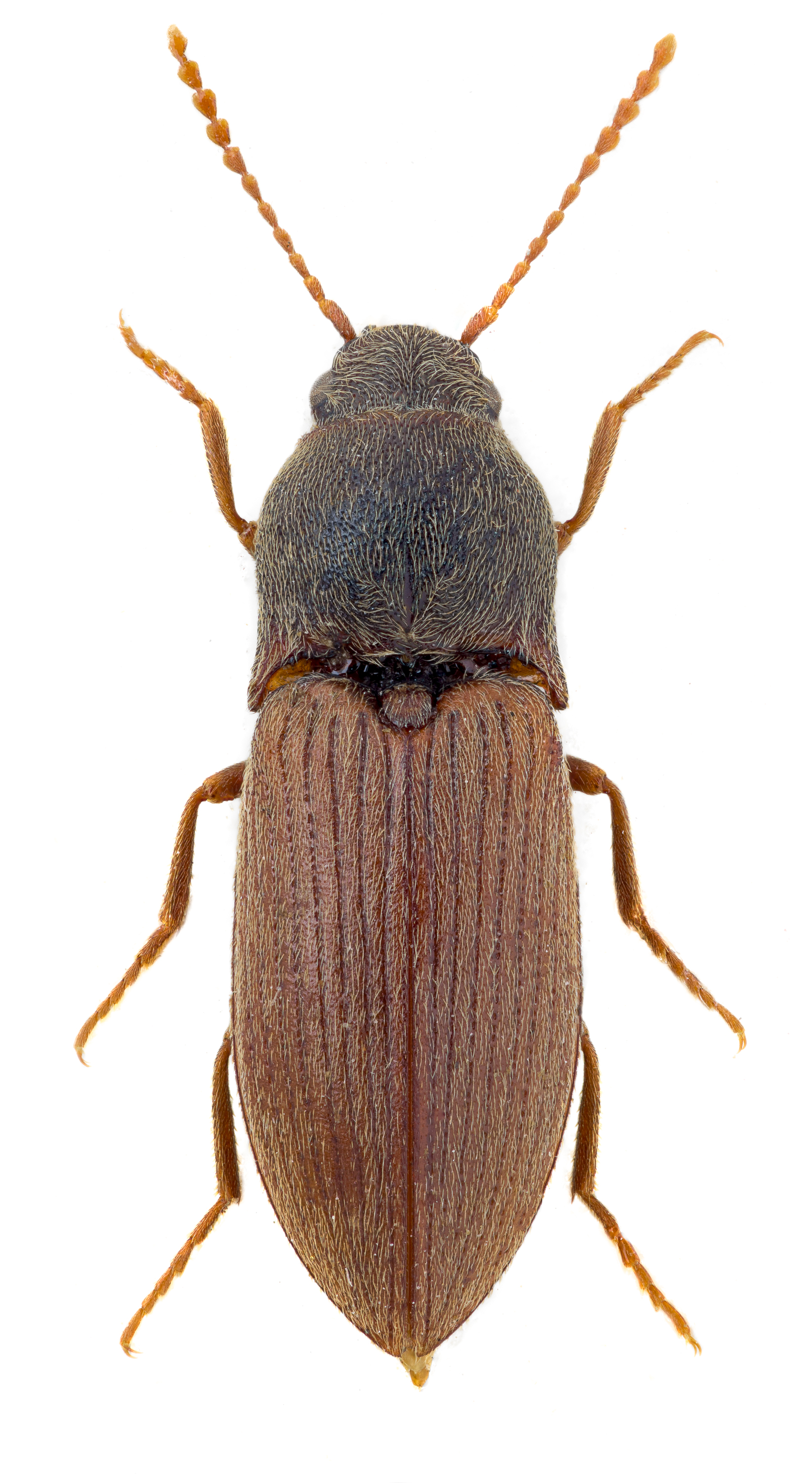
Agriotes obscurus

Non-farmed areas and grasslands are often cited as the natural habitat for Agriotes obscurus and other Agriotes species, where the adult beetles feed on the leaves of grasses and the polyphagous larvae (wireworms) on plant roots, seeds and tubers. From here, crops are invaded where the feeding of the A. obscurus larvae can cause considerable damage, especially on potatoes and cereals. In grasslands, the larvae feed on a variety to different plants, preferring certain species of grasses like Lolium perenne or Holcus lanatus while avoiding others like Festuca rubra. Some non-grass plants like common yarrow (Achillea millefolium) which are frequently found in grasslands may be also preferred by A. obscurus.

The life cycle is strongly influenced by the environment. Under field conditions, it extends over 3 or 4 years in central Europe and can be as short as 2 years in warmer regions. Egg laying starts in spring and the eggs hatch after about 3 weeks. There are 8 to 11 larval instars under laboratory conditions at 20 °C, but up to 13 instars in field cages in central Germany, where the life cycle was not fully completed at the end of a 30-months observation period. At 20 °C the duration of one larval instar ranges from 2½ weeks for the first instar to 100 and more days for the 6th and higher instars. The pupal stage lasts 2 weeks and the adults survive for a number of months and overwinter.

In Austria, the preferred environment of Agriotes obscurus is higher altitude characterized by lower temperatures, higher precipitation and acidic, humus-rich soils. In western Canada, ecological studies in non-farmed habitats in an agricultural landscape over 3 years found the distribution of A. obscurus to be clustered with a substantial temporal stability.

== Pheromones and traps ==
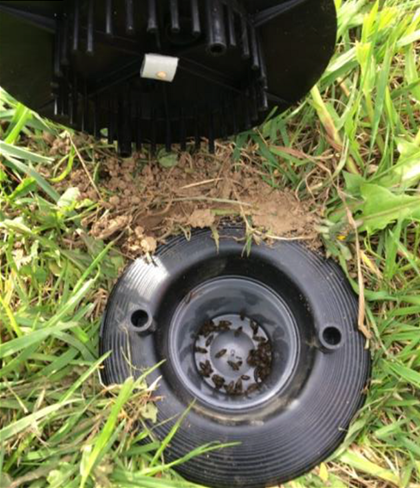
Vernon Pitfall Trap for catching Agriotes beetles. The lid of the trap has been opened and shows granules treated with the pheromone lure taped to the underside of the lid.

Geranyl hexanoate and geranyl octanoate are the main compounds produced in a ratio of 1:4 by the pheromone glands of Agriotes obscurus females. Both compounds are necessary for catching A. obscurus males and are usually applied in a ratio of 1:1. The pheromone is stable for several months and is very effective when used in pitfall traps and applied as treated granules produced from dried corn-cobs. However, it has a short attraction range of only a few meters. The pheromone traps are mainly used for monitoring A. obscurus infestations. They are species specific and catches are influenced by wind movements and the time of the year but are not affected by light conditions.

Agriotes obscurus larvae can be trapped by bait traps. Different designs have been described consisting of round plastic containers with holes and containing moistened cereal seeds. The traps are planted into the soil. Traps baited with wheat, oat, barley or rye seeds catch similar numbers of A. obscurus larvae and they catch larvae of other Agriotes species as well.

== Impact and management ==
=== Crop damage ===
Agriotes obscurus larvae attack roots, tubers, seeds and the stem base of seedlings. Serious damage has been reported for potatoes and cereals like wheat and maize. Wireworm feeding results in seedling mortality for cereals and in a reduced quality of harvested potato tubers because of feeding scars and blemishes on the surface as well as the presence of tunnels and holes in the tubers. Apart from potatoes and cereals, a large variety of other agricultural crops are also attacked by A. obscurus. These include root crops like beets or carrots, small fruits like strawberries or blueberries, oil crops like sunflowers, as well as vegetables and ornamentals. For potatoes, the feeding damage can amount to one third or more of the tubers showing serious damage and up to 10 feeding holes per tuber.

=== Pesticide use ===
For many years, Agriotes obscurus larvae and other wireworms have been controlled with organochloride pesticides like lindane. This class of pesticides is now banned through the Stockholm Convention because of their persistence and negative effects on the environment. Initially, organochlorides were replaced by organophosphate pesticides which are less persistent but highly toxic to humans, see organophosphate poisoning. Currently, mainly neonicotinoid pesticides are used for controlling A. obscurus infestations. However, these have two main drawbacks:

- They are highly toxic to beneficial insects like honey bees.
- While they prevent A. obscurus damage, they are mainly repellents and do not reduce the pest populations significantly.

Due to these constraints, increased attention is being paid to alternate control methods (see the following sections) and to integrated pest management (IPM). An IPM approach combines different control methods and is recommended in Europe. It requires monitoring the pest population and establishing IPM thresholds for specific crops. Control methods are then only applied if the threshold is reached. However, such thresholds have not yet been determined for A. obscurus.

=== Mating disruption and mass trapping ===
Sex pheromones can be used to disrupt the mating of pests, as well as for reducing pest populations through mass trapping. Both approaches have been studied for Agriotes obscurus. The mating disruption approach gave promising results and consisted of broadcasting pheromone-treated granules developed from dried corn-cobs. This approach would be easier to implement compared to mass trapping which requires installing a high density of pheromone baited pitfall traps due to the short attraction range of the pheromone. Grasslands surrounding crops are the main source of A. obscurus infesting agricultural fields and mass trapping in these grasslands could possibly also prevent crop damage.

=== Biological control ===
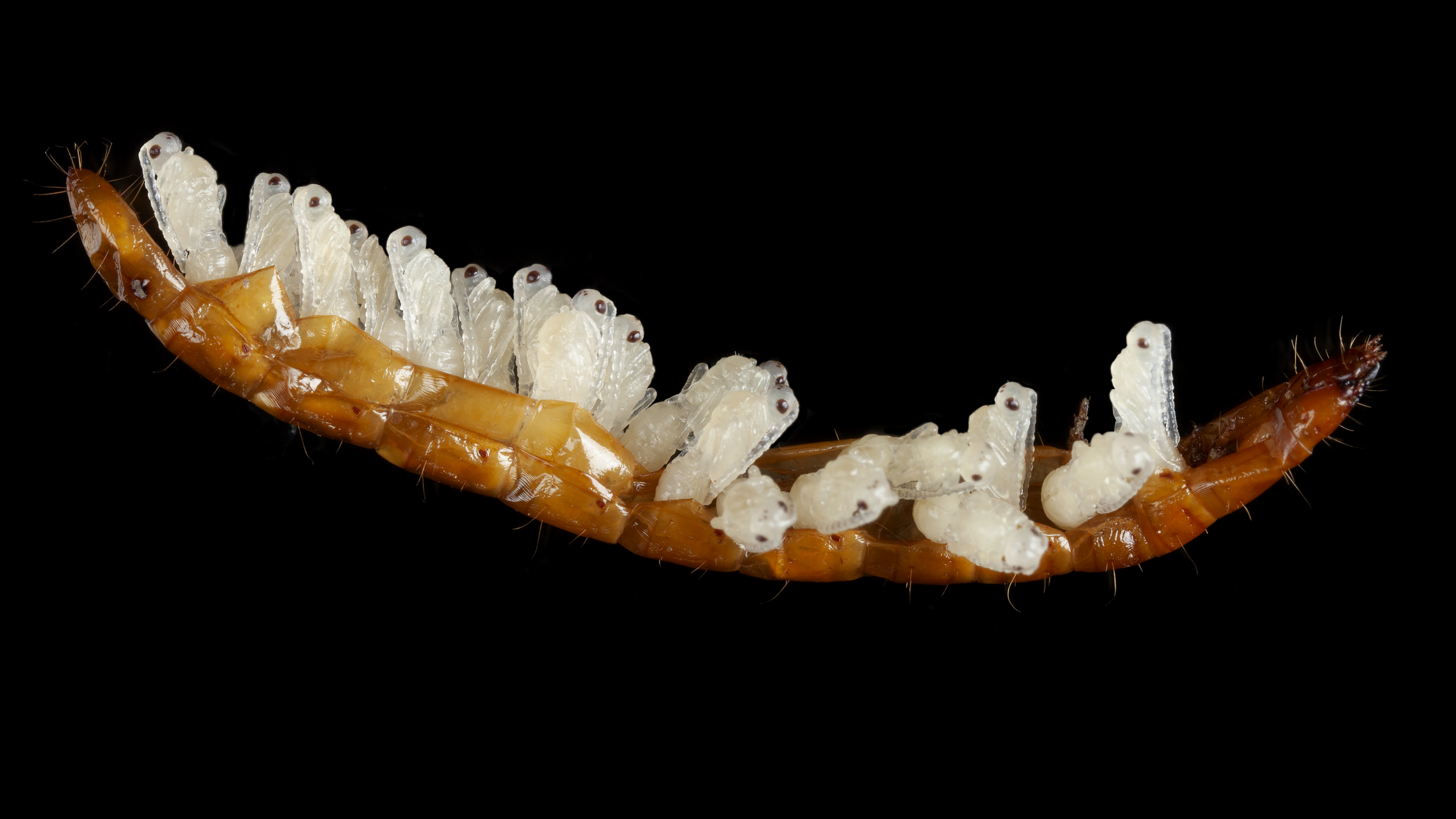
Pupae of the parasitoid Paracodrus apterogynus emerging from a larva of Agriotes obscurus

Various natural enemies have been described which could be used to control Agriotes obscurus. For example, the gregarious hymenopteran parasitoid Paracodrus apterogynus (family Proctotrupidae) attacks A. obscurus in Europe. The females are wingless and apparently search for Agriotes larvae underground. However, during a survey in France, only few wireworms were found to be naturally parasitized by this wasp.

Among diseases, entomopathogenic fungi appear to be most attractive for implementing biological control of wireworms, since they can be mass produced and stored relatively easily. A number of studies have focused on using species of Metarhizium as biocontrol agents against Agriotes obscurus. These include several isolates of Metarhizium brunneum which gave high mortality of A. obscurus larvae in field and semi-field trials when applied as fungus-colonized cereal seeds at a rate of 10^{14} conidia per ha. Wireworm mortality was comparable to that of treatments with insecticide-coated seeds. The conidia remained active in the soil for up to 8 months.

=== Other non-chemical control methods ===
Other non-chemical control methods include the planting of an alternative crop if damaging levels of wireworm are detected. In general, crop rotation helps to reduce wireworm populations, as do practices like timing tilling and irrigation in order to destroy eggs and young wireworm larvae in the top soil layer by desiccation. In addition, some potato varieties have shown tolerance to attacks by Agriotes species. Further, promising results have been obtained with planting of a trap crop in order to divert Agriotes obscurus larvae from more valuable crops like strawberry. A physical exclusion trench can also prevent A. obscurus adults from migrating into crop fields.

== Taxonomy ==
Various synonym names have been published for Agriotes obscurus. Apart from the basionym, Elater obscurus Linnaeus 1758, these include:

1. Elater badius Müller 1764 - In his description of the insects of Fridrichsdal (now called Frederiksstaden, a part of Copenhagen in Denmark), Müller listed and described 15 species of Elater, including 4 new species. The Latin description of Elater badius is very brief: Thorax and abdomen glossy black, elytra with stripes and these and the legs chestnut brown. Separately, Elater obscurus is briefly described: Thorax dark brown, elytra dark brick-red.
2. Elater obtusus De Geer 1774 - In his book "Mémoires pour servir à l'histoire des insects" De Geer described many species of click beetles ("taupins"). Two of them which are described under the names "Elater (fuscus minor)" and "Elater (obtusus)", are often cited as synonyms of Elater obscurus. Elater obtusus is described by De Geer as shorter than Elater fuscus minor and with grey hairs on head and thorax. Although De Geer listed several species described by Linnaeus in his book, he did not include Elater obscurus among his click beetles. The taxonomy of the species described by De Geer in 1774 has been regarded as doubtful because his names are not always binomial. For example, "Elater (fuscus minor)" is a polynomial name. In a ruling by the International Commission on Zoological Nomenclature in 2014 it was decided that the binomial names in De Geer's book are taxonomically valid, but 140 of his polynomial names have been suppressed, including Elater fuscus minor.
3. Elater variabilis Fabricius 1792 - Fabricius listed and described 89 species of Elater, including both Elater obscurus (no. 44) and Elater variabilis (no. 65). However, he did not discuss the differences between both species and both descriptions are extremely short: Elater obscurus – pitch black, thorax and elytra dusky black. Elater variabilis – thorax brown-black, elytra striped and brick-red. A species with the name Elater variabilis was also described previously by De Geer on page 154 of his above-mentioned book.
4. Elater hirtellus Herbst 1806 - Herbst listed 175 species of Elater, including Elater obscurus Linnaeus (page 108) and two other species, now regarded as synonyms of that species: Elater variabilis Fabricius (page 75) as well as a new species Elater hirtellus (page 94). However, he did not discuss similarities or differences between these.

Agriotes cinnamomeus Buysson 1893 and Agriotes radhosticola Fleischer 1910 are also sometimes listed as synonyms of Agriotes obscurus, but these names were actually proposed as varieties of A. obscurus.
