= Flaminio Baudi di Selve =

Italian entomologist

Flaminio Baudi di Selve (7 July 1821, Savigliano – 26 June 1901, Genoa) was an Italian entomologist who specialised in Coleoptera and Heteroptera.

He wrote a monograph on darkling beetles, Europae et circummediterraneae Faunae Tenebrionidum specierum, quae Comes Dejean in suo Catalogo, editio 3, consignavit, ejusdem collectione in R. Taurinensi Musaeo asservata, cum auctorum hodierne recepta denominatione collatio, originally published in Deutsche Entomologische Zeitschrift volumes 19-21, from 1875–77, and later collected into the Catalogo dei coleotteri del Piemonte, published in Torino in 1889, by Tip. e. Lit. Camilla E. Bertolero. He also wrote numerous shorter works on beetles, and described many new species.

His insect collection, mainly palearctic species, is shared between the Museo Civico di Storia Naturale di Genova, the Turin Museum of Natural History and the Museo Regionale di Scienze Naturali Regione Piemonte.
