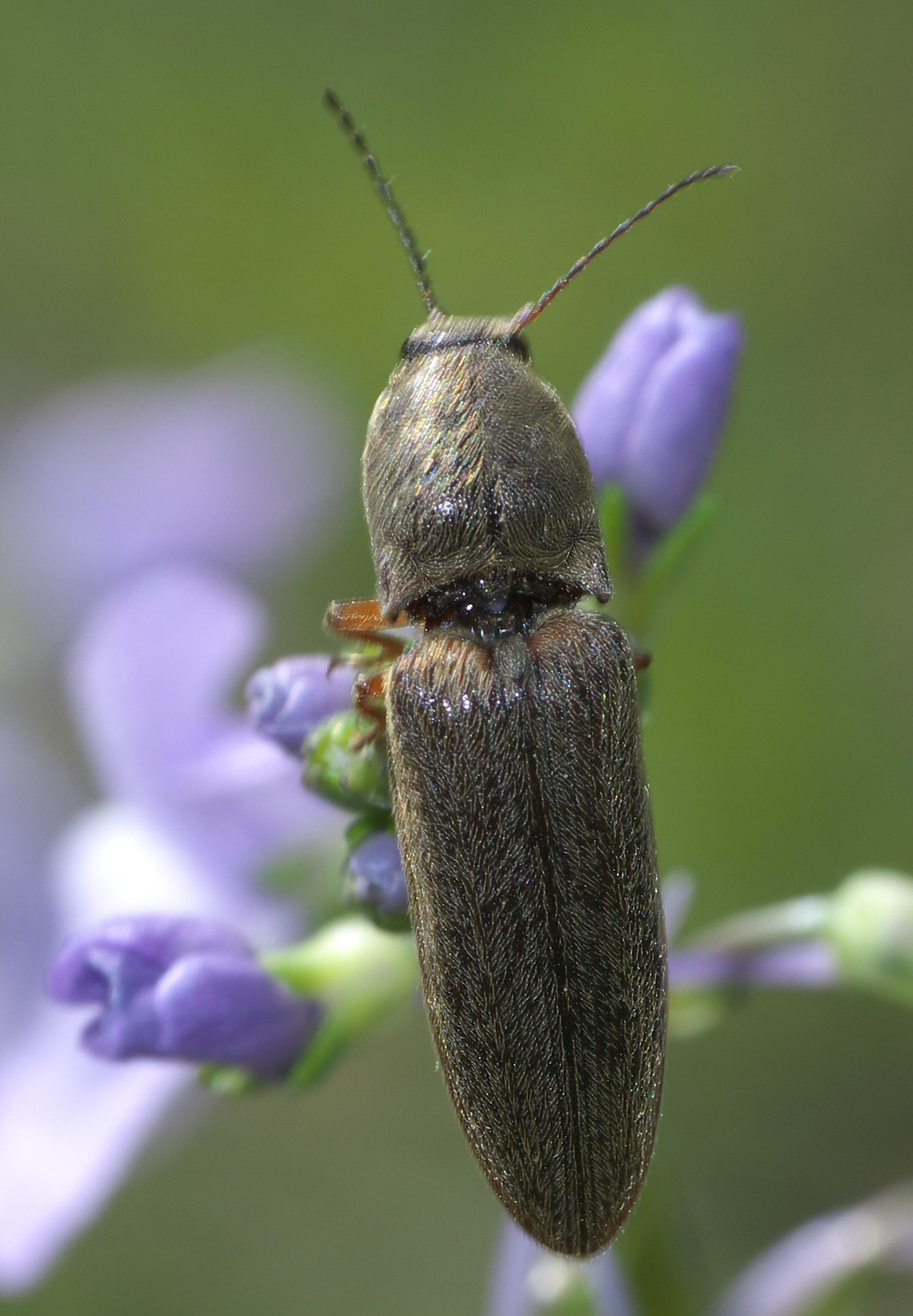
- Gambrinus

Scientific classification
- Kingdom: Animalia
- Phylum: Arthropoda
- Class: Insecta
- Order: Coleoptera
- Suborder: Polyphaga
- Infraorder: Elateriformia
- Family: Elateridae
- Subfamily: Dendrometrinae; Gistel, 1848

Tribes
- Crepidomenini; Dendrometrini; Dimini; Hypnoidini; Oxynopterini; Pleonomini; Prosternini; Selatosomini; Semiotini; Senodoniini

= Dendrometrinae =

Subfamily of beetles

Dendrometrinae is a very large subfamily of click beetles in the family Elateridae, containing 10 tribes worldwide, including several formerly recognized subfamily-rank groups such as Athoinae, Crepidomeninae, Denticollinae, Oxynopterinae, Prosterninae, and Semiotinae now all reduced to tribal rank or lower.

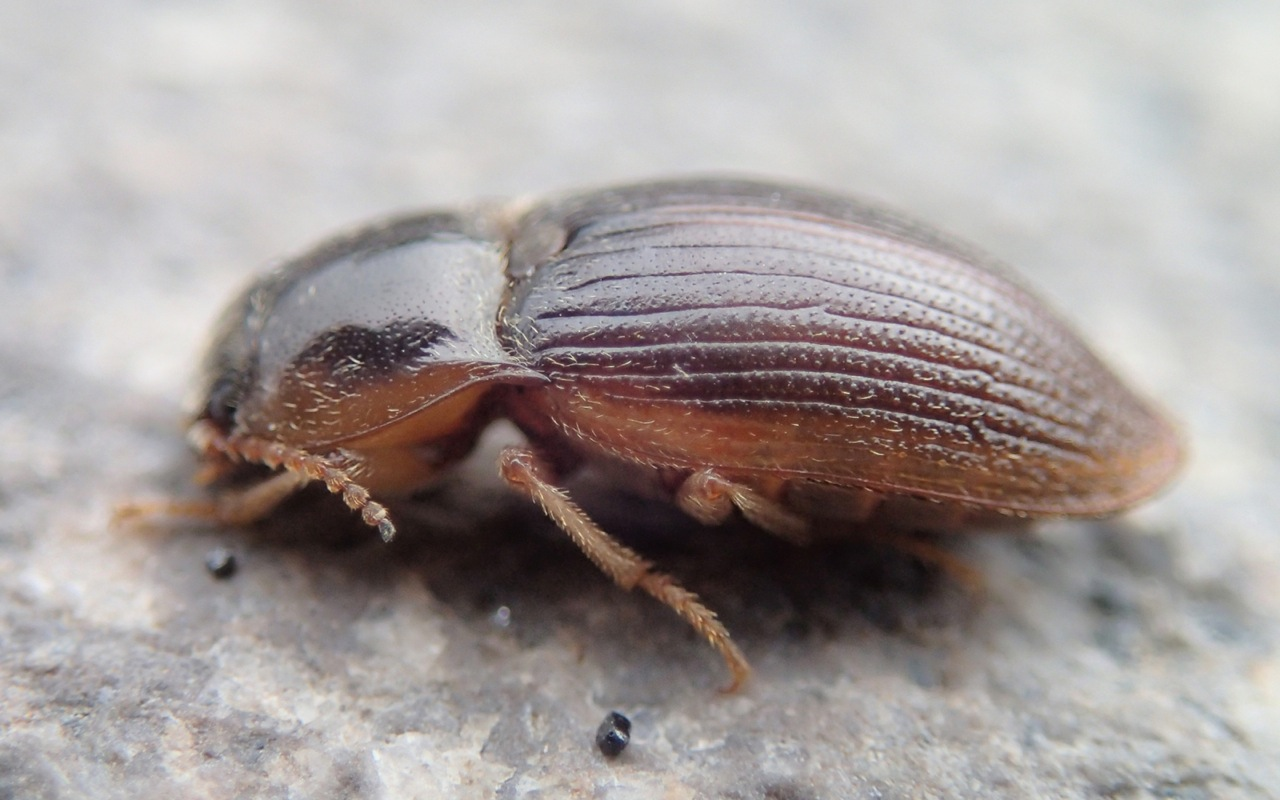
Hypolithus littoralis

== North American genera ==
- Actenicerus Kiesenwetter, 1858^{g b}
- Anostirus C.G.Thomson, 1859^{g b}
- Anthracopteryx Horn, 1891^{b}
- Ascoliocerus Méquignon, 1930^{g b}
- Athous Eschscholtz, 1829^{b}
- Beckerus Johnson in Majka & Johnson, 2008^{g b}
- Berninelsonius Leseigneur, 1970^{g b}
- Corymbitodes Buysson, 1904^{g b}
- Ctenicera Latreille, 1829^{i c g b}
- Denticollis Piller & Mitterpacher, 1783^{g b}
- Eanus Leconte, 1861^{g b}
- Elathous Reitter, 1890^{g b}
- Euplastius Schwarz, 1903^{b}
- Gambrinus LeConte, 1853
- Hadromorphus Motschoulsky, 1859^{g b}
- Harminius Fairmaire, 1851^{g b}
- Hemicrepidius Germar, 1839^{g b}
- Hypnoidus Dillwyn, 1829^{g b}
- Hypoganus Kiesenwetter, 1858^{g b}
- Hypolithus Eschscholtz, 1829^{i c g b}
- Ligmargus Stibick, 1976^{g b}
- Limonius Eschscholtz, 1829^{i c g b}
- Liotrichus Kiesenwetter, 1858^{g b}
- Margaiostus Stibick, 1978^{g b}
- Metanomus Buysson, 1887^{g b}
- Neopristilophus Buysson, 1894^{g b}
- Nitidolimonius Johnson in Majka & Johnson, 2008^{g b}
- Oxygonus LeConte^{g b}
- Paractenicera Johnson in Majka & Johnson, 2008^{g b}
- Pheletes Kiesenwetter, 1858
- Prosternon Latreille, 1834^{g b}
- Pseudanostirus Dolin, 1964^{g b}
- Selatosomus Stephens, 1830^{g b}
- Setasomus Gurjeva, 1985^{g b}
- Sylvanelater Johnson in Majka & Johnson, 2008^{g b}

Data sources: i = ITIS, c = Catalogue of Life, g = GBIF, b = Bugguide.net
