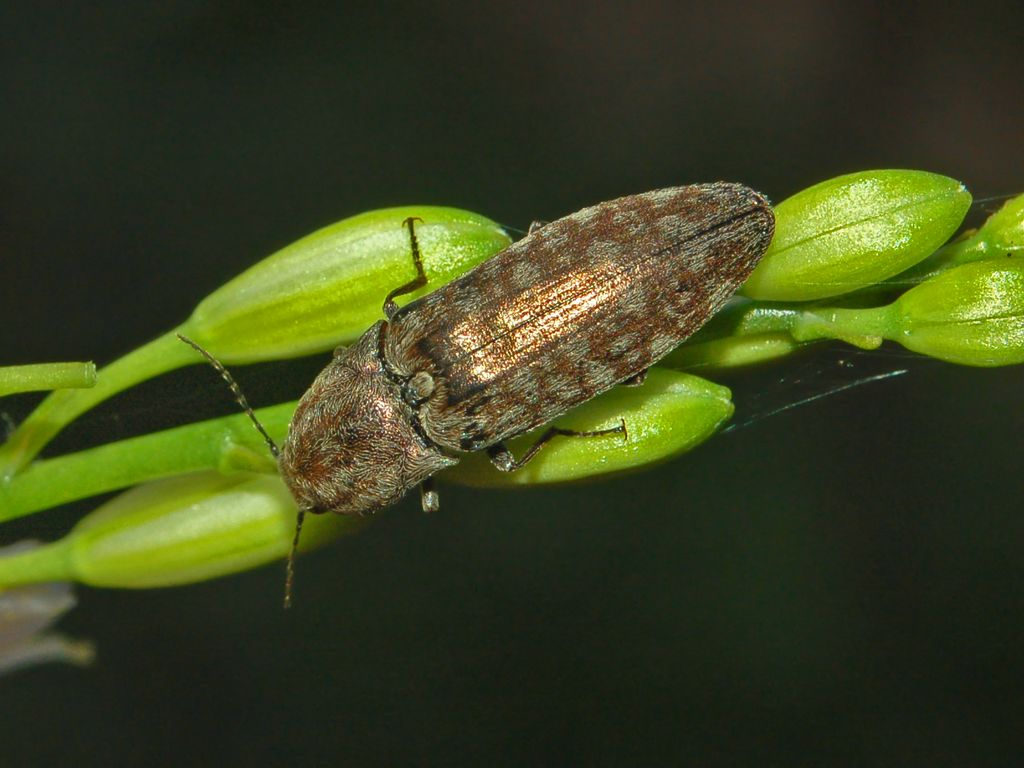

Scientific classification
- Domain: Eukaryota
- Kingdom: Animalia
- Phylum: Arthropoda
- Class: Insecta
- Order: Coleoptera
- Suborder: Polyphaga
- Infraorder: Elateriformia
- Family: Elateridae
- Subfamily: Dendrometrinae
- Tribe: Prosternini
- Genus: Actenicerus
- Species: A. siaelandicus

Binomial name
- Actenicerus siaelandicus (O. F. Müller, 1764)

Synonyms
- Actenicerus sjaelandicus (O. F. Müller, 1764)

= Actenicerus siaelandicus =

Species of beetle

Actenicerus siaelandicus is a species of click beetle belonging to the family Elateridae, subfamily Dendrometrinae.

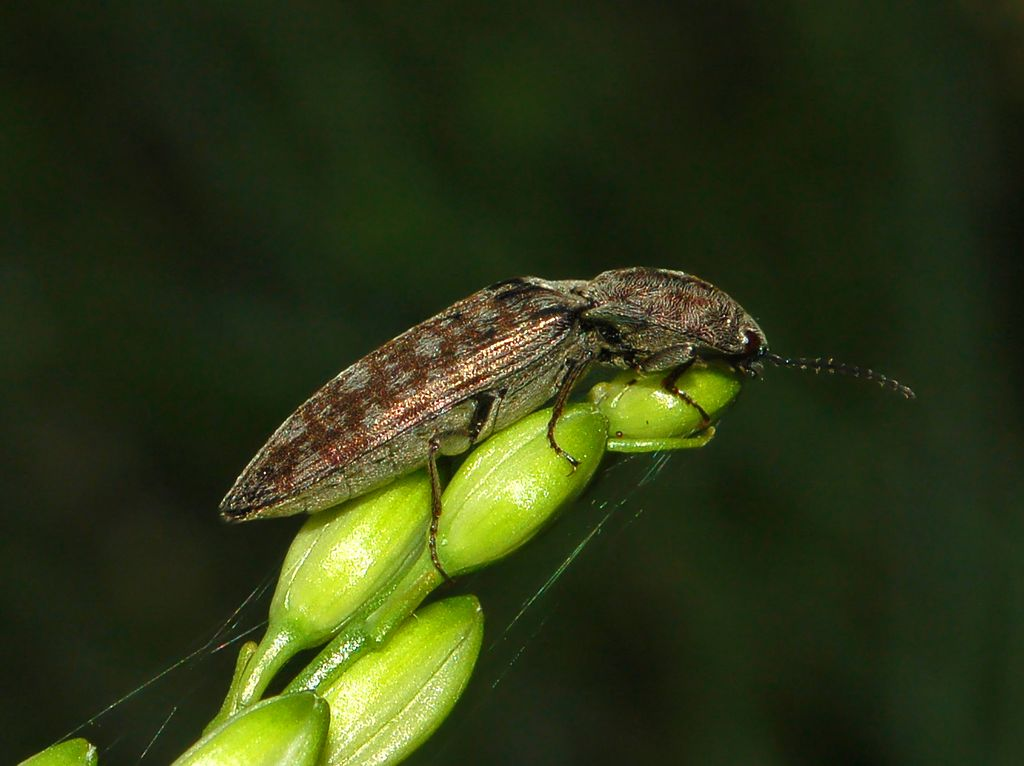
A. siaelandicus – lateral view

This beetle is present in most of Europe, in the East Palearctic realm and in the Nearctic realm.

The adults grow up to 10–17 millimetres (0.39–0.67 in) long and can mostly be encountered from May through August, mainly in wet meadows, bogs and marshes. One of preferred host-plants are Carex species.

The whole body is bronzed-brownish or auburn-purplish, with a greyish pubescence.
