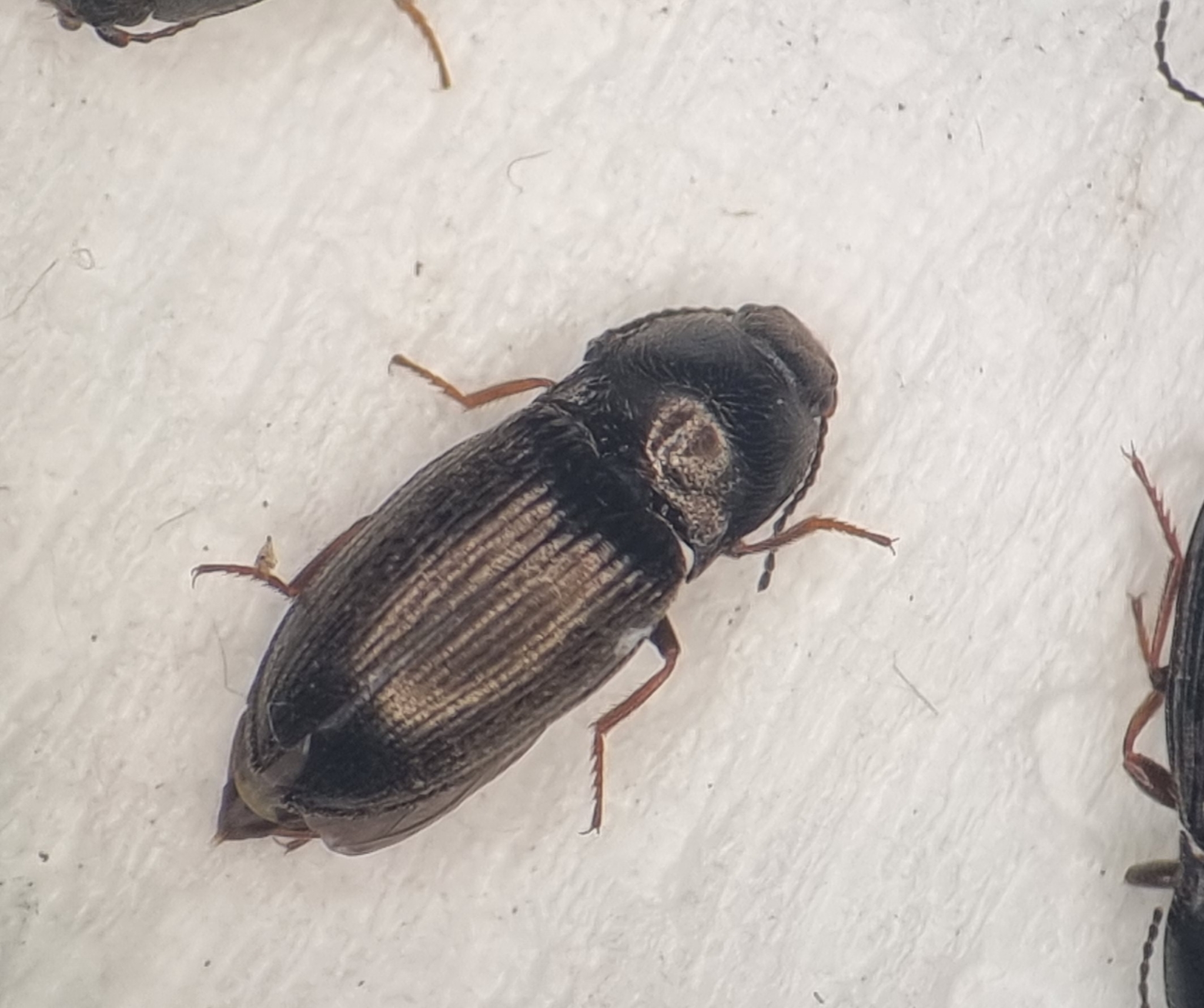
- Hypnoidus riparius, UK

Scientific classification
- Kingdom: Animalia
- Phylum: Arthropoda
- Clade: Pancrustacea
- Class: Insecta
- Order: Coleoptera
- Suborder: Polyphaga
- Infraorder: Elateriformia
- Family: Elateridae
- Subfamily: Dendrometrinae
- Tribe: Hypnoidini
- Genus: Hypnoidus
- Species: H. riparius

Binomial name
- Hypnoidus riparius (Fabricius, 1792)

Synonyms
- Cryptohypnus riparius (Fabricius, 1792); Elater riparius Fabricius, 1792

= Hypnoidus riparius =

Species of beetle

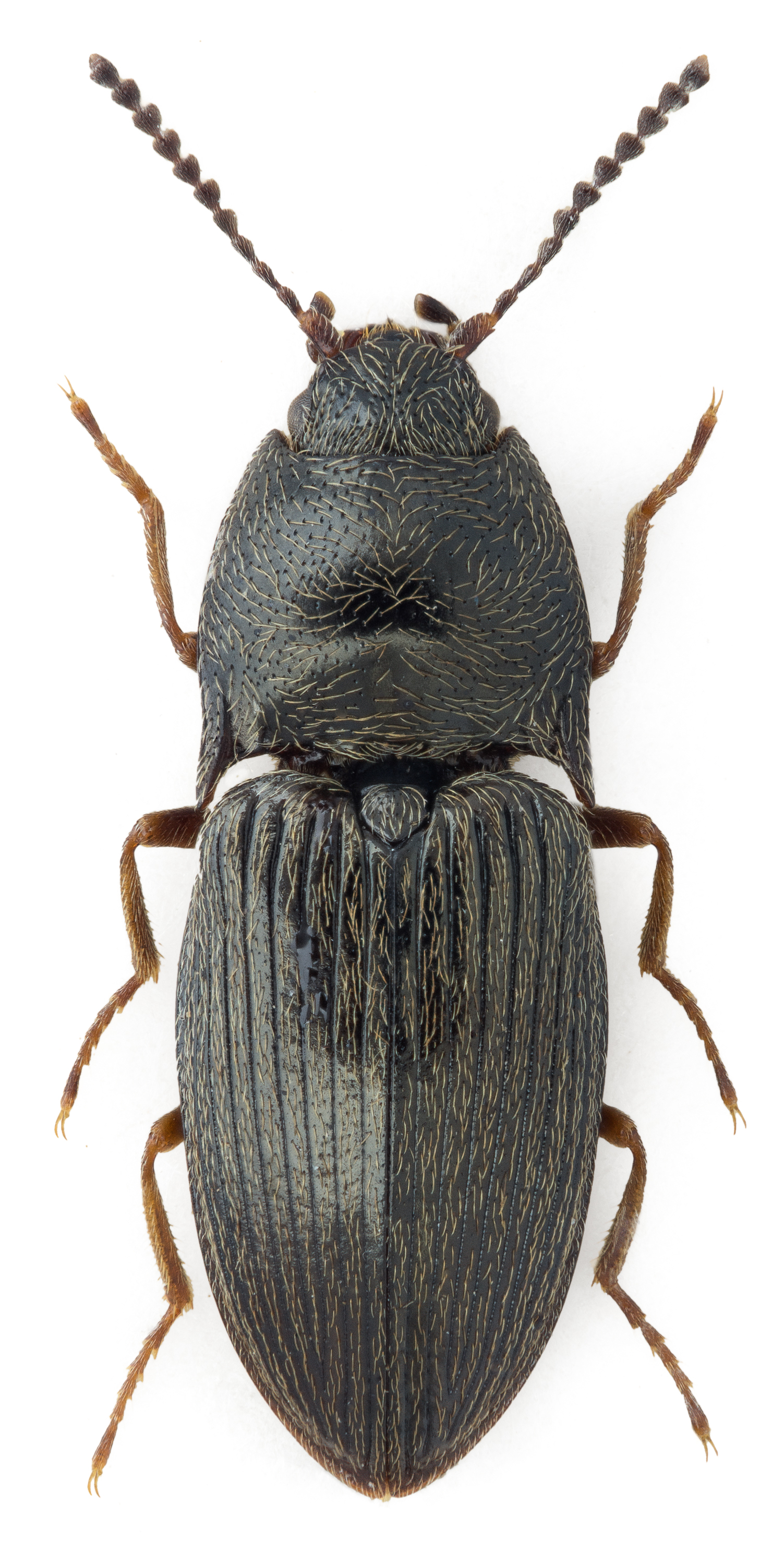
Hypnoidus riparius

Hypnoidus riparius is a species of click beetles native to Europe.
