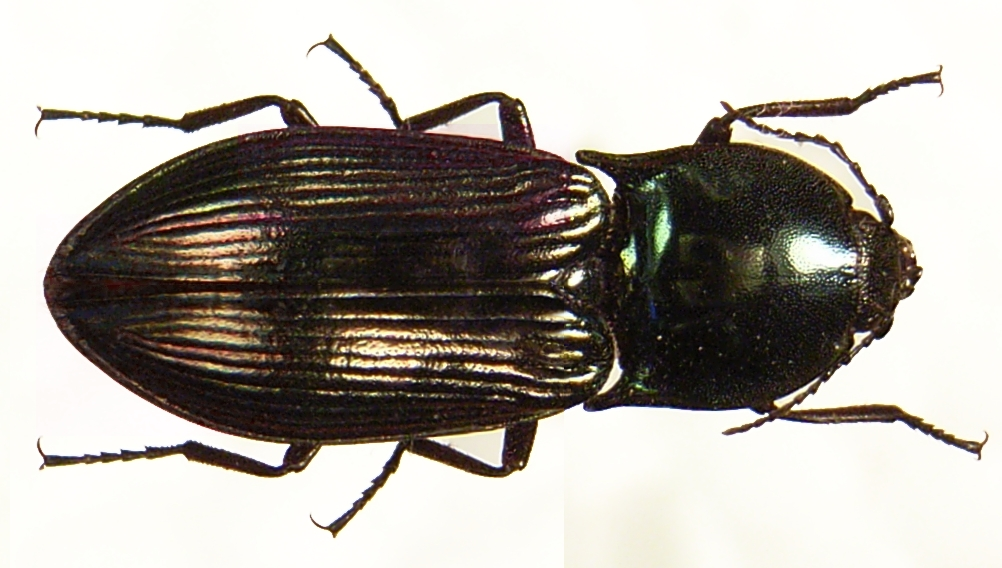
- Selatosomus aeneus

Scientific classification
- Domain: Eukaryota
- Kingdom: Animalia
- Phylum: Arthropoda
- Class: Insecta
- Order: Coleoptera
- Suborder: Polyphaga
- Infraorder: Elateriformia
- Family: Elateridae
- Subfamily: Dendrometrinae
- Tribe: Prosternini
- Genus: Selatosomus; Stephens, 1830

Synonyms
- List: Aphatistus Chenu, 1860; Aphodeutes Agassiz, 1846; Aphodistus Agassiz, 1846; Aphotistus Kirby, 1837; Diacanthus Latreille, 1834; Eanoides Kishii, 1966; Pristilophus Latreille, 1834; Pristolophus Chenu, 1860; Selastomus; Selastosomus Balduf, 1935; Selatapteria Tarnawski, 1995; Warchalowskia Tarnawski, 1995

= Selatosomus =

Genus of beetles

Selatosomus is a genus of beetles belonging to the family Elateridae. The species of this genus are found in Europe, Japan, southern Africa and North America, and most of the species were formerly included in the genus Ctenicera.

== Selected species ==
- Selatosomus aeneus (Linnaeus, 1758)
- Selatosomus aeripennis (Kirby, 1837)
- Selatosomus amplicollis (Germar, 1843)
- Selatosomus appropinquans (Randall, 1838)
- Selatosomus carbo (LeConte, 1853)
- Selatosomus caucasicus Ménétriés, 1832
- Selatosomus confluens (Gebler, 1829)
- Selatosomus coreanus
- Selatosomus cruciatus (Linnaeus, 1758)
- Selatosomus destructor (W.J.Brown, 1935)
- Selatosomus festivus (LeConte, 1857)
- Selatosomus funereus (W.J.Brown, 1936)
- Selatosomus gloriosus (Kishii, 1955)
- Selatosomus graecus Tarnawski, 1995
- Selatosomus grandis
- Selatosomus huanghaoi Qiu, 2018
- Selatosomus jailensis Dolin, 1971
- Selatosomus lateralis (LeConte, 1853)
- Selatosomus latus (Fabricius, 1801)
- Selatosomus melancholicus (Fabricius, 1798)
- Selatosomus miegi Theobald, 1937
- Selatosomus montanus (W.J.Brown, 1935)
- Selatosomus morulus (LeConte, 1863)
- Selatosomus nigricans (Fall, 1910)
- Selatosomus pruininus (Horn, 1871)
- Selatosomus puerilis
- Selatosomus pulcher (LeConte, 1853)
- Selatosomus rugosus
- Selatosomus semimetallicus (Walker, 1866)
- Selatosomus sexualis (W.J.Brown, 1935)
- Selatosomus splendens (Ziegler, 1844)
- Selatosomus suckleyi (LeConte, 1857)
- Selatosomus tauricus Dolin, 1975
