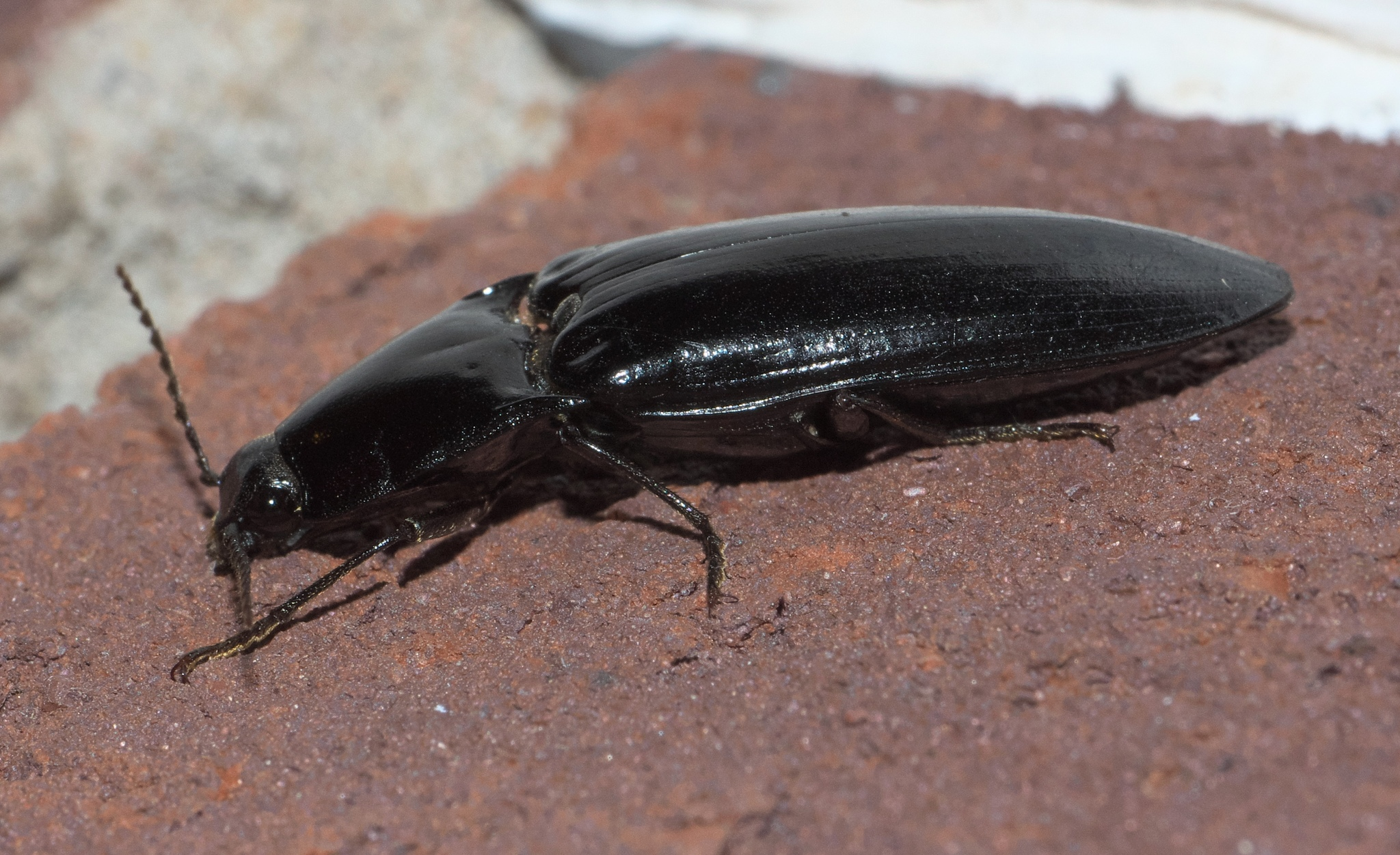
- Melanactes piceus, Oklahoma

Scientific classification
- Kingdom: Animalia
- Phylum: Arthropoda
- Class: Insecta
- Order: Coleoptera
- Suborder: Polyphaga
- Infraorder: Elateriformia
- Family: Elateridae
- Tribe: Oxynopterini
- Genus: Melanactes
- Species: M. piceus

Binomial name
- Melanactes piceus (DeGeer, 1774)

= Melanactes piceus =

Species of beetles

Melanactes piceus is a species of click beetle in the family Elateridae.

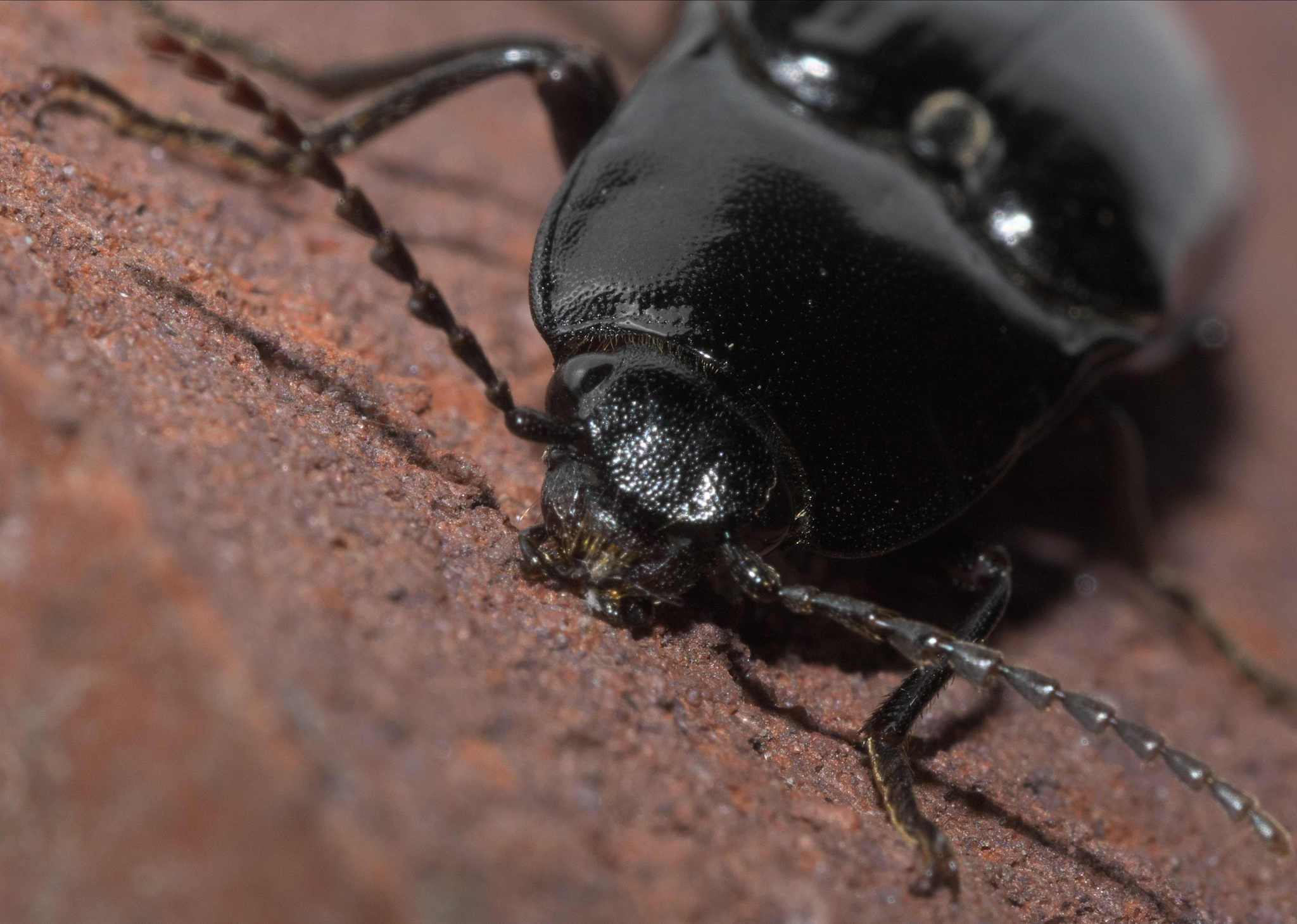
Melanactes piceus, Oklahoma
