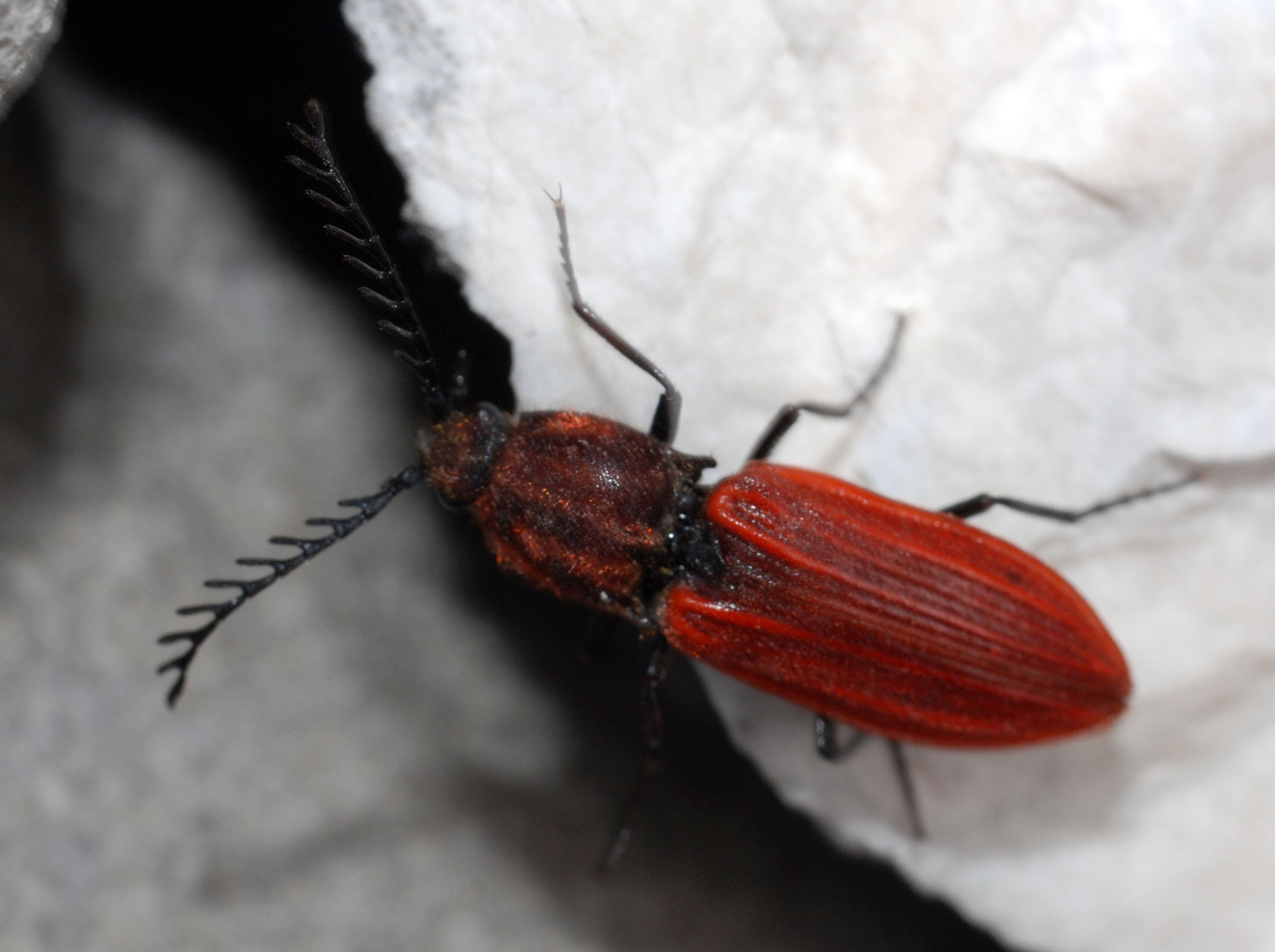
- Anostirus sp.

Scientific classification
- Kingdom: Animalia
- Phylum: Arthropoda
- Class: Insecta
- Order: Coleoptera
- Suborder: Polyphaga
- Infraorder: Elateriformia
- Family: Elateridae
- Subfamily: Dendrometrinae
- Tribe: Prosternini; Gistel, 1856

= Prosternini =

Tribe of beetles

Prosternini is a tribe of click beetles in the family Elateridae. There are at least 20 genera and 90 described species in North America, and others elsewhere.

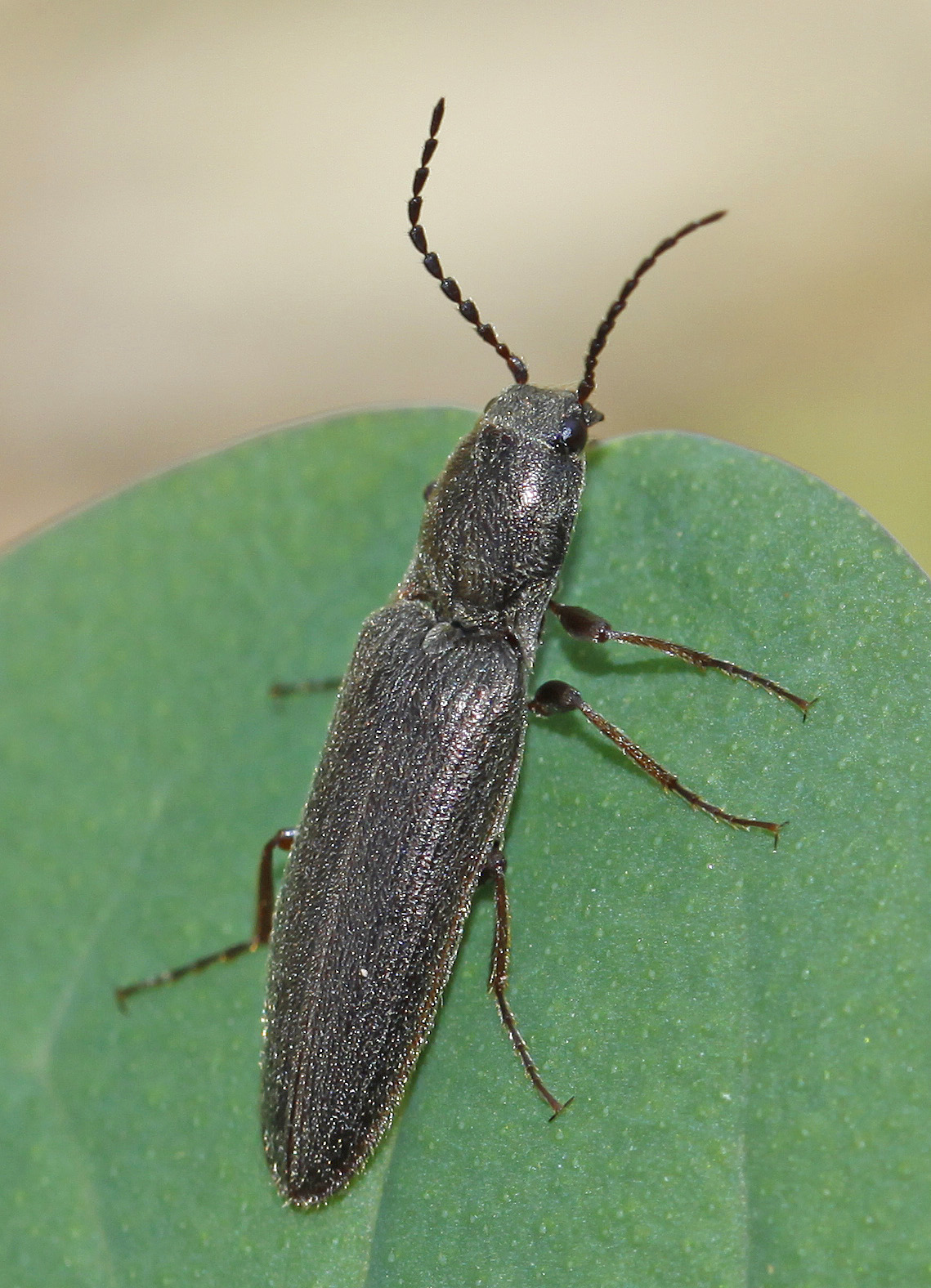
Sylvanelater cylindriformis

== North American genera ==
- Actenicerus Kiesenwetter, 1858^{g b}
- Anostirus C.G.Thomson, 1859^{g b}
- Anthracopteryx Horn, 1891^{b}
- Beckerus Johnson in Majka & Johnson, 2008^{g b}
- Corymbitodes Buysson, 1904^{g b}
- Ctenicera Latreille, 1829^{i c g b}
- Eanus Leconte, 1861^{g b}
- Hadromorphus Motschoulsky, 1859^{g b}
- Hypoganus Kiesenwetter, 1858^{g b}
- Liotrichus Kiesenwetter, 1858^{g b}
- Metanomus Buysson, 1887^{g b}
- Neopristilophus Buysson, 1894^{g b}
- Nitidolimonius Johnson in Majka & Johnson, 2008^{g b}
- Oxygonus LeConte^{g b}
- Paractenicera Johnson in Majka & Johnson, 2008^{g b}
- Prosternon Latreille, 1834^{g b}
- Pseudanostirus Dolin, 1964^{g b}
- Selatosomus Stephens, 1830^{g b}
- Setasomus Gurjeva, 1985^{g b}
- Sylvanelater Johnson in Majka & Johnson, 2008^{g b}

Data sources: i = ITIS, c = Catalogue of Life, g = GBIF, b = Bugguide.net
