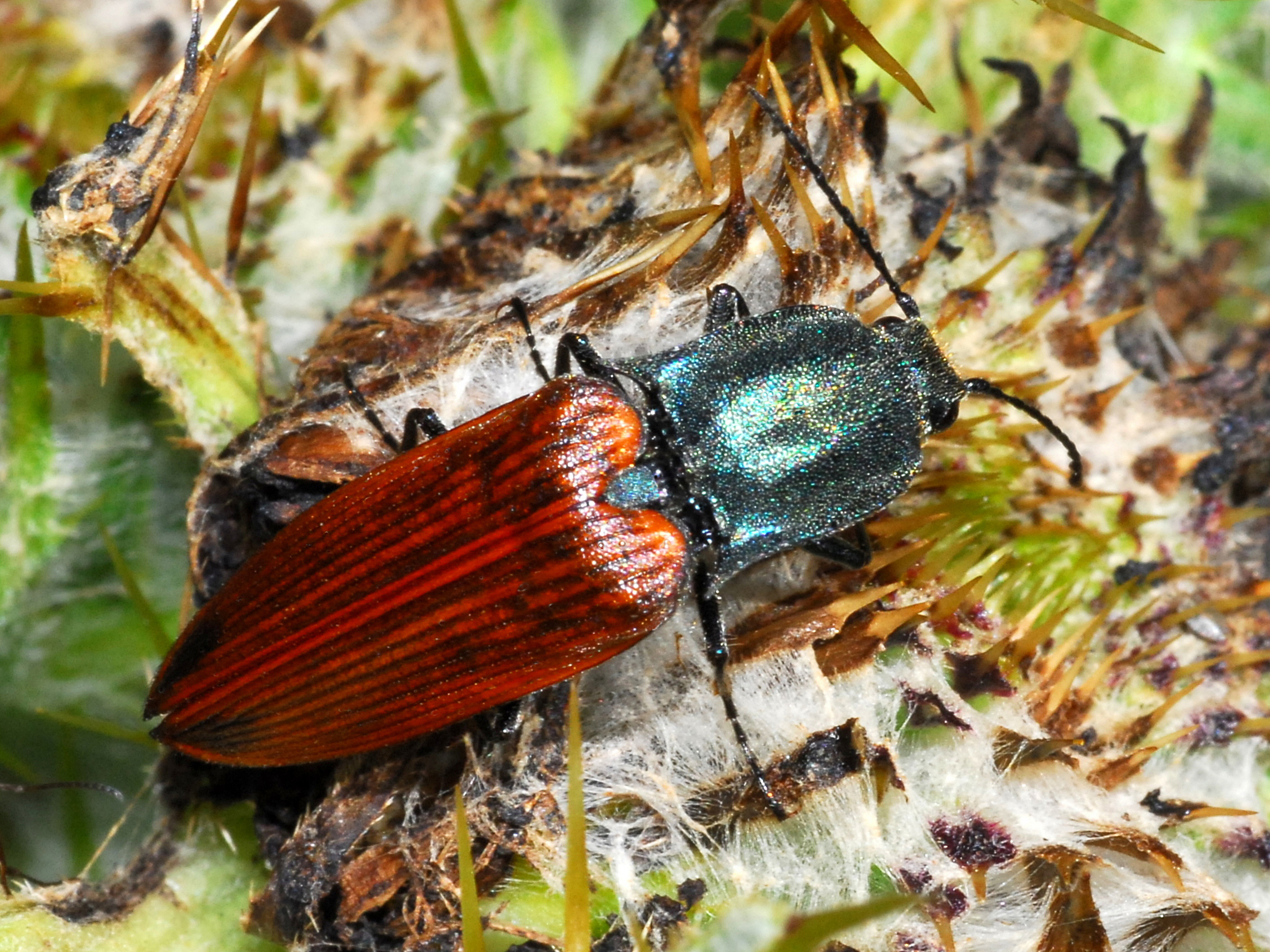
- Female
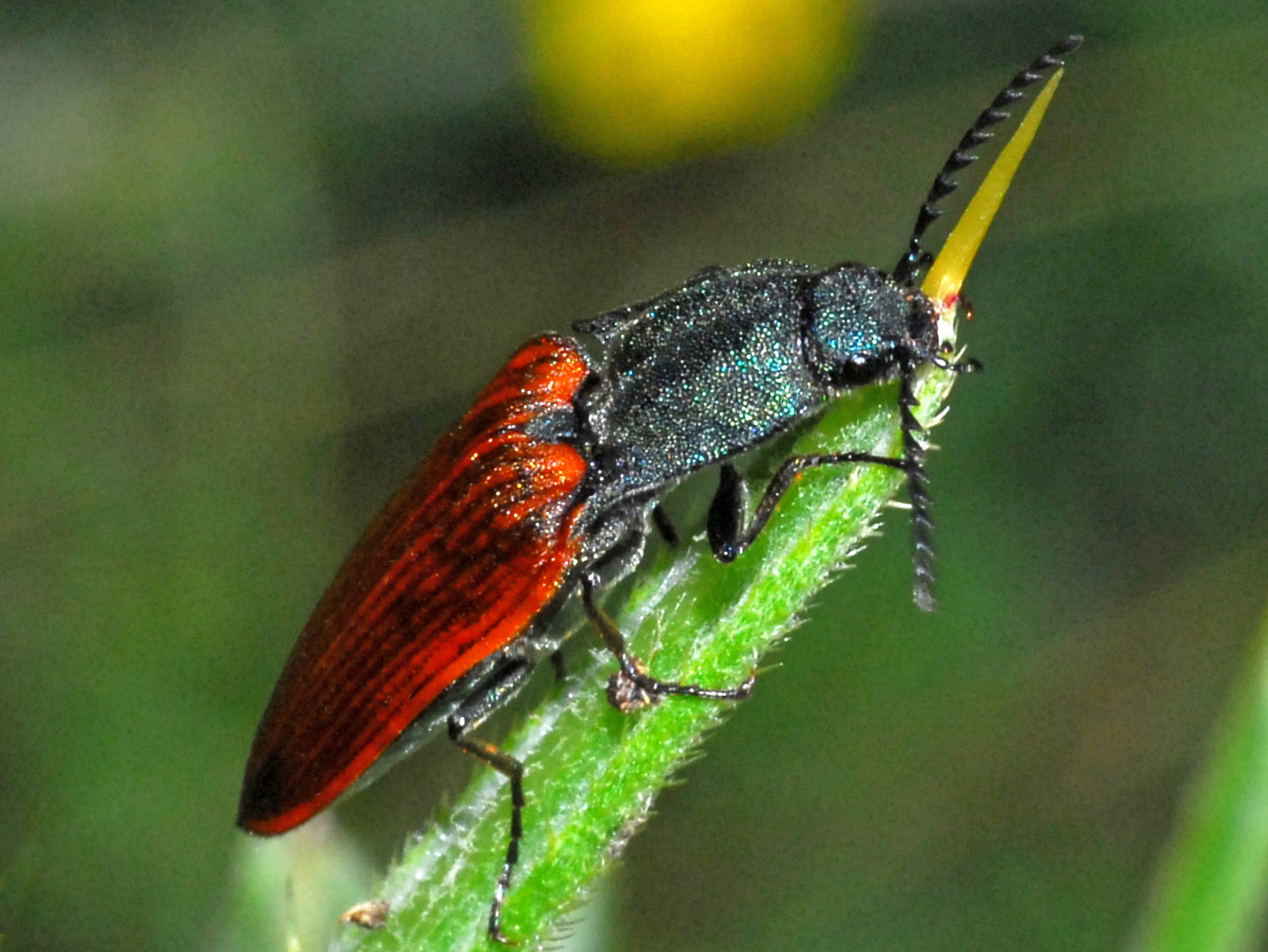
- Side view

Scientific classification
- Kingdom: Animalia
- Phylum: Arthropoda
- Clade: Pancrustacea
- Class: Insecta
- Order: Coleoptera
- Suborder: Polyphaga
- Infraorder: Elateriformia
- Family: Elateridae
- Genus: Ctenicera
- Species: C. virens

Binomial name
- Ctenicera virens (Schrank, 1781)

Synonyms
- Elater virens Schrank, 1781

= Ctenicera virens =

Species of beetle

Ctenicera virens is a species of click beetles.

== Distribution ==
This species is present in Central Europe, in the Alps, Carpathian Mountains, Balkan Peninsula, Crimea, and in the Nearctic realm. It occurs in Austria, Belgium, Bosnia and Herzegovina, Bulgaria, Czech Republic, Estonia, France, Germany, Hungary, Northern Italy, Poland, Romania, Slovakia, Slovenia, Switzerland, and Ukraine.

== Habitat ==
This species normally inhabits mountainous and submontane areas, valleys of rivers and streams and moist mid-forest clearings. These beetles can be found on grasses and flowers of grasslands and glades.

== Description ==
Ctenicera virens can reach a body length of about 15–21 mm (0.59–0.83 in). These large and colorful click beetles have yellowish or reddish-brown elytra. They can be monochrome or with a green-bronzed marking just before the extremity. The head and the pronotum are brilliant metallic green. Pronotum is rather dotted on the sides. The males have strongly combed antennas, while the females show saw-toothed antennas from the third article onwards.

== Biology ==
The life cycle of this species develops in several years. Adults appear after wintering and can be found from mid-May until July. Females lay eggs in the soil in May–June. The larvae develop in superficial moist humus. They are mainly predatory, but they also feed on the underground parts of herbaceous plants. Pupation occurs in July–August.

== Bibliography ==
- Václav Dušánek - The larval key to Ctenicera species (Coleoptera, Elateridae) of the Czech Republic and Slovakia - Kahlikova 19, CZ - 78901, Zábřeh
- G. Pedroni, G. Platia. Elateridae fauna of Aosta Valley (Coleoptera, Elateridae). Rev. Valdôtaine Hist. Nat. 56: 67–98, 2002 (in Italian)
- Burakowski B., Mroczkowski M., Stefańska J. (1985) - Chrząszcze – Coleoptera. Buprestoidea, Elateroidea i Cantharoidea - Katalog Fauny Polski•vol.: XXIII•issue: 10•publisher: Warszawa (in Polish)
