= Selatosomus pruininus =

Scientific classification
- Domain: Eukaryota
- Kingdom: Animalia
- Phylum: Arthropoda
- Class: Insecta
- Order: Coleoptera
- Suborder: Polyphaga
- Infraorder: Elateriformia
- Family: Elateridae
- Genus: Selatosomus
- Species: S. pruininus

Binomial name
- Selatosomus pruininus (Horn, 1871)

Species of beetle

Selatosomus pruininus, the Great Basin wireworm, is a nocturnal species of click beetle native to the Great Basin area of the western United States.
