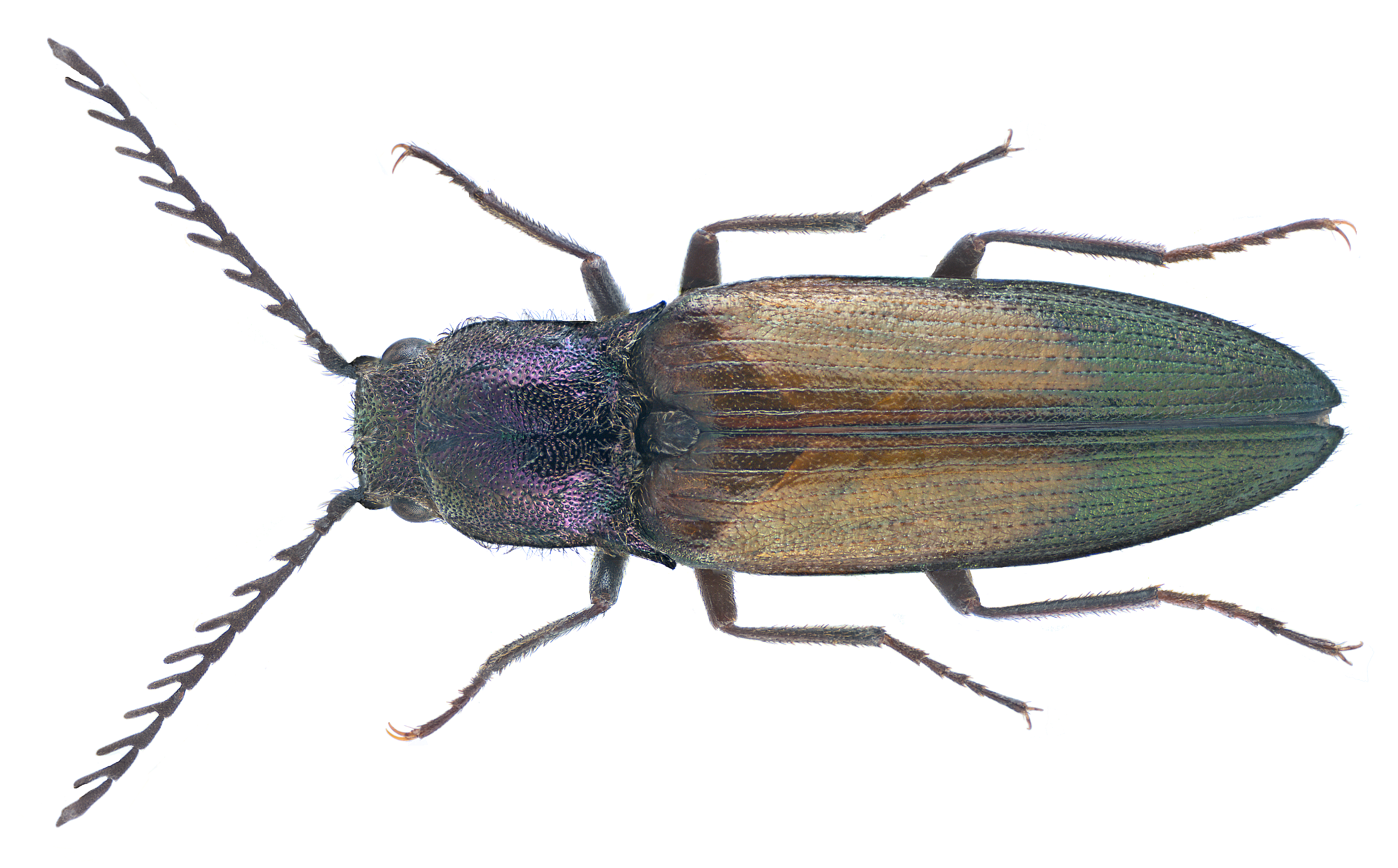
- Ctenicera cuprea 13,0 mm (12,5 to 16,5 mm)

Scientific classification
- Domain: Eukaryota
- Kingdom: Animalia
- Phylum: Arthropoda
- Class: Insecta
- Order: Coleoptera
- Suborder: Polyphaga
- Infraorder: Elateriformia
- Family: Elateridae
- Genus: Ctenicera
- Species: C. cuprea

Binomial name
- Ctenicera cuprea (Fabricius, 1775)

= Ctenicera cuprea =

Species of beetle

Ctenicera cuprea is a species of click beetles native to Europe.
