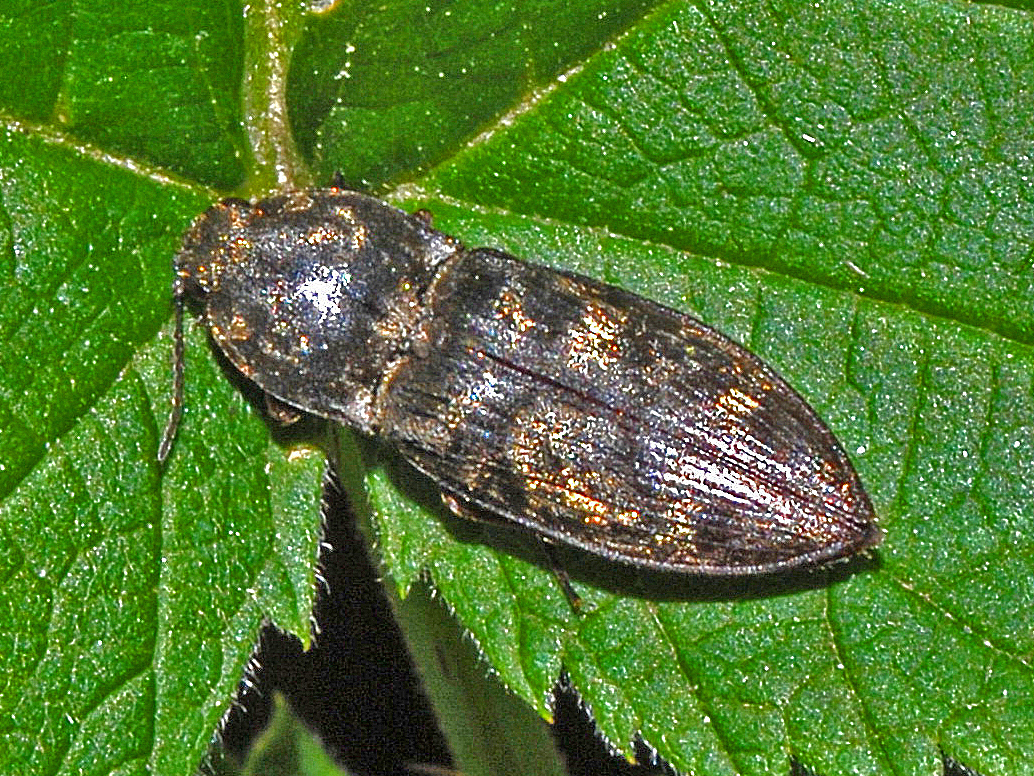
- Dorsal view

Scientific classification
- Kingdom: Animalia
- Phylum: Arthropoda
- Class: Insecta
- Order: Coleoptera
- Suborder: Polyphaga
- Infraorder: Elateriformia
- Family: Elateridae
- Genus: Prosternon
- Species: P. tessellatum

Binomial name
- Prosternon tessellatum (Linnaeus, 1758)

= Prosternon tessellatum =

Species of beetle

Prosternon tessellatum, the chequered click beetle, is a species of click beetle belonging to the family Elateridae.

== Distribution ==
This species is widespread in Europe, in Asia, and in the Nearctic realm.

== Habitat ==
These beetles inhabit mountain areas, coniferous forests, dry forest edges and forest meadows, but also heathland, moors, dunes and gardens.

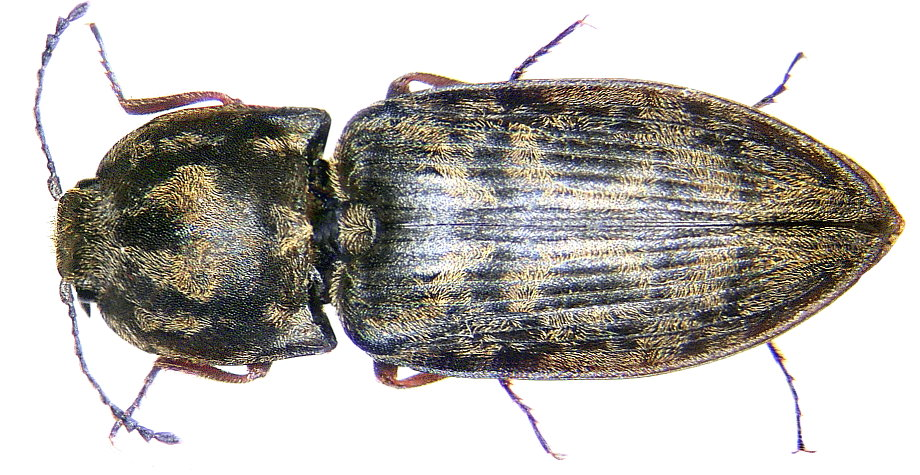
Mounted specimen

== Description ==
Prosternon tessellatum can reach a body length of approximately 10–12 millimetres (0.39–0.47 in). These beetles have a hairiness blackish-brown pronotum and striped elytra, with paler silk-hairy gray-yellow to gold-shining stains.

They are rather similar to Agrypnus murinus, that is smaller.

== Biology ==
Adults can be found from May to early August, feeding on flowers, shrubs and low vegetation.

Larvae of this species live in tree stumps of conifers and in humus. They are predators and destroy cocoons of pine-tree lappet (Dendrolimus pini) and pine sawfly (Neodiprion).
