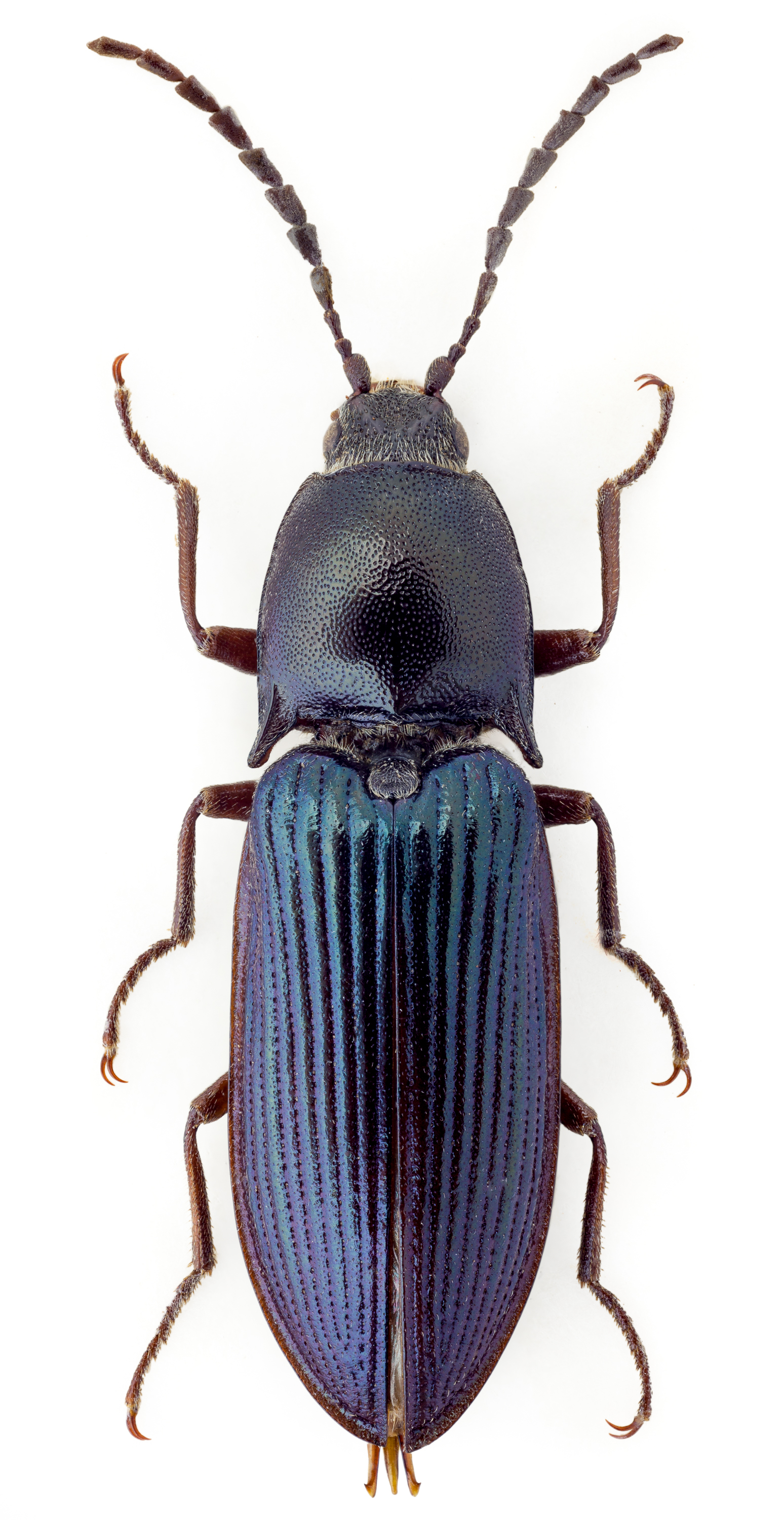

Scientific classification
- Kingdom: Animalia
- Phylum: Arthropoda
- Clade: Pancrustacea
- Class: Insecta
- Order: Coleoptera
- Suborder: Polyphaga
- Infraorder: Elateriformia
- Family: Elateridae
- Genus: Selatosomus
- Species: S. melancholicus

Binomial name
- Selatosomus melancholicus (Fabricius, 1798)

= Selatosomus melancholicus =

Species of beetle

Selatosomus melancholicus is a species of click beetle native to Europe. This species is in the subgenus Pristilophus, which some authorities treat as a separate genus (e.g.,).
