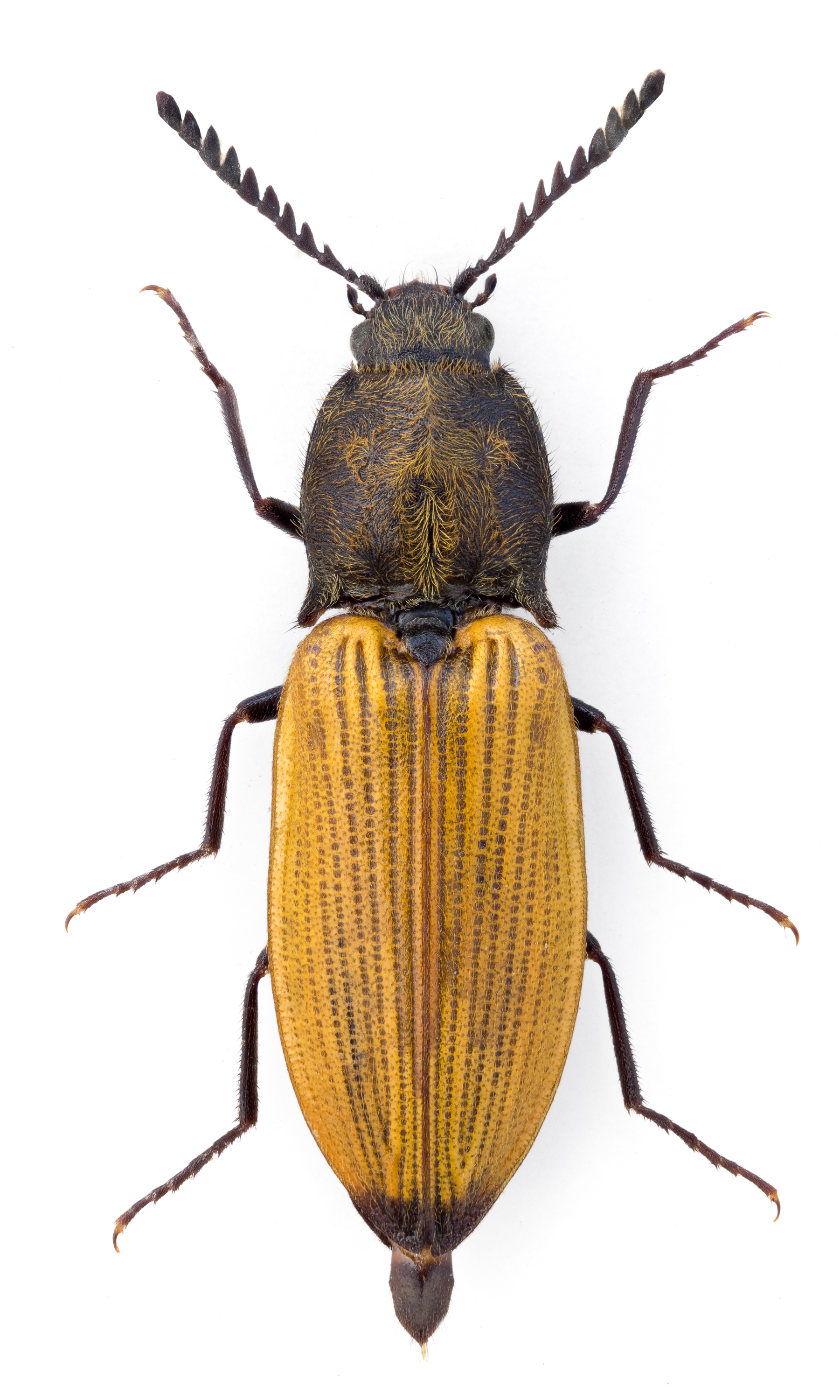
- Anostirus castaneus

Scientific classification
- Domain: Eukaryota
- Kingdom: Animalia
- Phylum: Arthropoda
- Class: Insecta
- Order: Coleoptera
- Suborder: Polyphaga
- Infraorder: Elateriformia
- Family: Elateridae
- Subfamily: Dendrometrinae
- Tribe: Prosternini
- Genus: Anostirus; C. G. Thomson, 1859

= Anostirus =

Genus of beetles

Anostirus is a genus of beetles in the family Elateridae.

First record of Anostirus gracilicollis was made in Hungary by Stierlin in 1896.

The genus was described in 1859 by Carl Gustaf Thomson.

The genus has cosmopolitan distribution.

Species:

- Anostirus alexandri Wurst, 1995
- Anostirus ataturki Platia & Gudenzi, 2000
- Anostirus atropilosus Buysson, 1898
- Anostirus binaghii Platia & Gudenzi, 2006
- Anostirus boeberi (Germar, 1824)
- Anostirus castaneus (Linnaeus, 1758)
- Anostirus cerrutii Binaghi, 1940
- Anostirus daimio (Lewis, 1894)
- Anostirus dalmatinus Müller, 1925
- Anostirus edecorus (Schwarz, 1906)
- Anostirus eschscholtzii (Faldermann, 1835)
- Anostirus gabilloti (Pic, 1907)
- Anostirus ghilarovi Gurjeva, 1988
- Anostirus gracilicollis (Stierlin, 1896)
- Anostirus gudenzii Platia, 1983
- Anostirus haemapterus (Illiger, 1807)
- Anostirus hirculus Gurjeva, 1988
- Anostirus holtzi (Schwarz, 1902)
- Anostirus incostatus (Pic, 1905)
- Anostirus jarmilae Cechovsky & Platia, 1991
- Anostirus lauianus Wurst, 1995
- Anostirus lederi (Heyden, 1878)
- Anostirus marginatus (Pic, 1931)
- Anostirus melas (Koenig, 1887)
- Anostirus nubilosus Wurst & Schimmel, 1995
- Anostirus parumcostatus (Buysson, 1894)
- Anostirus plagifer (Reitter, 1914)
- Anostirus pseudosulphuripennis Binaghi, 1940
- Anostirus pulchellus (Denisova, 1948)
- Anostirus pullatus Gurjeva, 1989
- Anostirus purpureus (Poda, 1761)
- Anostirus reissi (Reitter, 1914)
- Anostirus richterae Gurjeva, 1988
- Anostirus saltinii Cate, Platia & Schimmel, 2002
- Anostirus semiaurantiacus (Fairmaire, 1891)
- Anostirus stramineipennis Binaghi, 1940
- Anostirus sulphuripennis (Germar, 1843)
- Anostirus suvorovi (Reitter, 1910)
- Anostirus teheranus Binaghi, 1940
- Anostirus trivialis Gurjeva, 1988
- Anostirus turcicus Platia & Mertlik, 1996
- Anostirus turkestanicus (Stepanov, 1935)
- Anostirus venustus Gurjeva, 1988
- Anostirus zenii (Rosenhauer, 1856)
