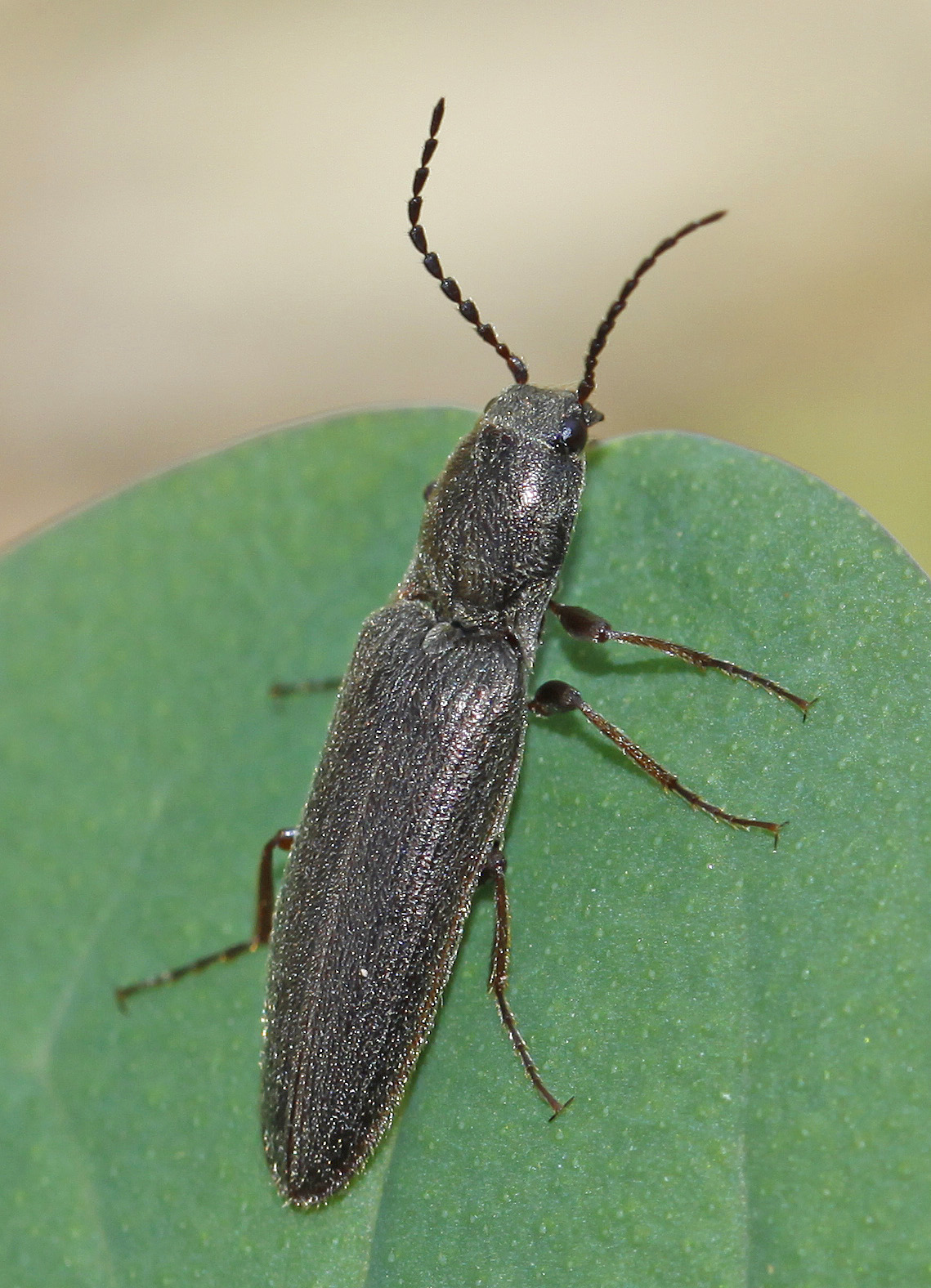

Scientific classification
- Kingdom: Animalia
- Phylum: Arthropoda
- Class: Insecta
- Order: Coleoptera
- Suborder: Polyphaga
- Infraorder: Elateriformia
- Family: Elateridae
- Genus: Sylvanelater
- Species: S. cylindriformis

Binomial name
- Sylvanelater cylindriformis (Herbst, 1806)

= Sylvanelater cylindriformis =

Species of beetle

Sylvanelater cylindriformis is a species of click beetle in the family Elateridae.
