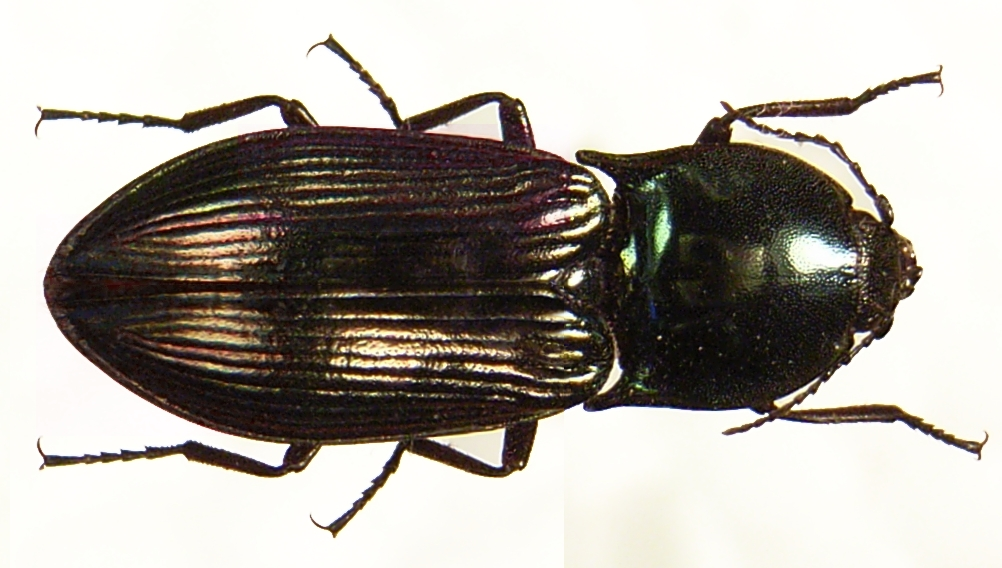

Scientific classification
- Kingdom: Animalia
- Phylum: Arthropoda
- Class: Insecta
- Order: Coleoptera
- Suborder: Polyphaga
- Infraorder: Elateriformia
- Family: Elateridae
- Genus: Selatosomus
- Species: S. aeneus

Binomial name
- Selatosomus aeneus (Linnaeus, 1758)

Synonyms
- Corymbites aeneus Linnaeus, 1758

= Selatosomus aeneus =

Species of beetle

Selatosomus aeneus is a species of click beetle found in Europe. It was originally described as Corymbites aeneus by Carl Linnaeus.
