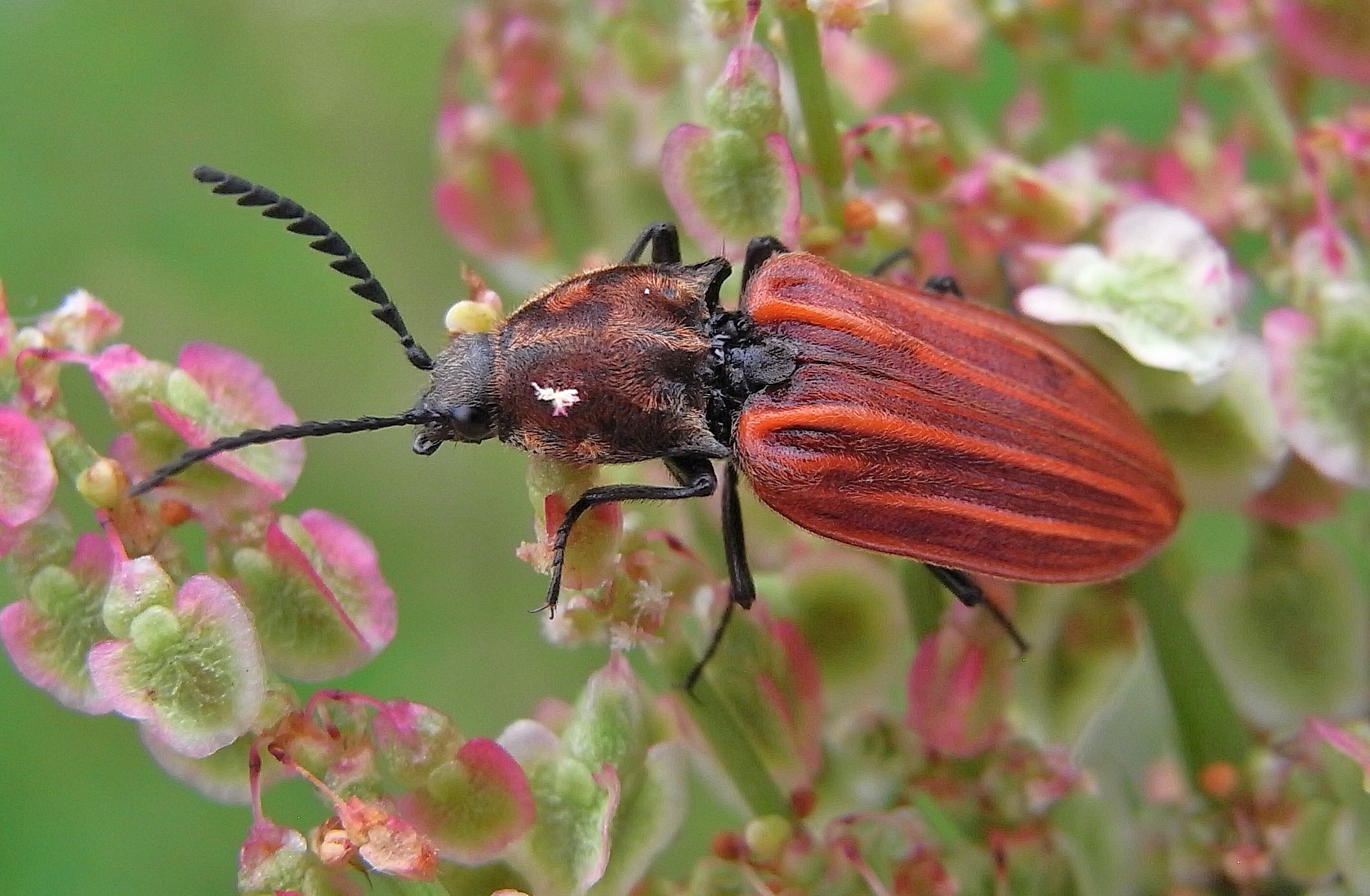

Scientific classification
- Domain: Eukaryota
- Kingdom: Animalia
- Phylum: Arthropoda
- Class: Insecta
- Order: Coleoptera
- Suborder: Polyphaga
- Infraorder: Elateriformia
- Family: Elateridae
- Genus: Anostirus
- Species: A. purpureus

Binomial name
- Anostirus purpureus (Poda, 1761)

= Anostirus purpureus =

Species of beetle

Anostirus purpureus is a species of beetle belonging to the family Elateridae.

It is native to Central and Southern Europe.
