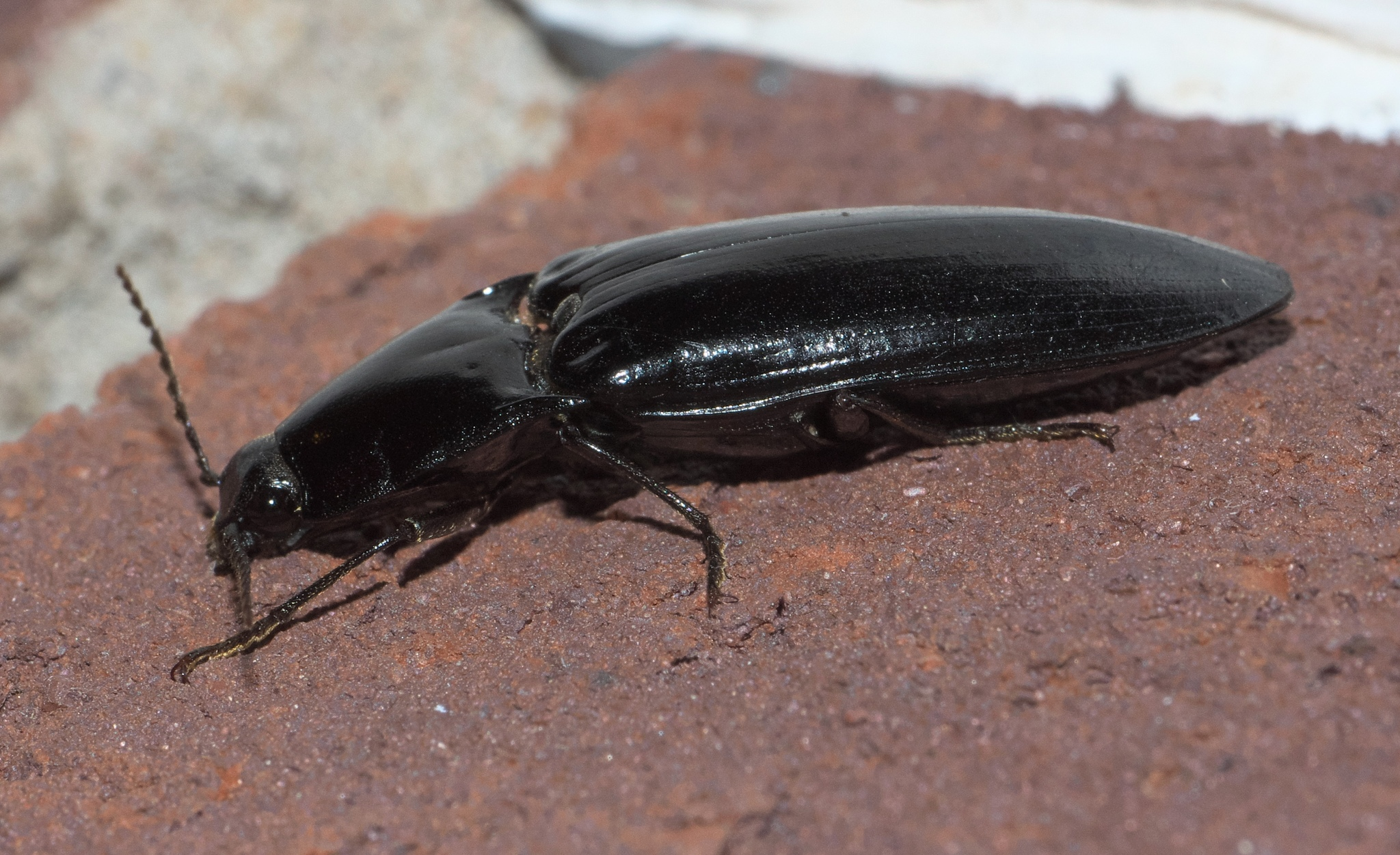
- Melanactes piceus, Oklahoma

Scientific classification
- Kingdom: Animalia
- Phylum: Arthropoda
- Class: Insecta
- Order: Coleoptera
- Suborder: Polyphaga
- Infraorder: Elateriformia
- Family: Elateridae
- Tribe: Oxynopterini
- Genus: Melanactes; LeConte, 1854

= Melanactes =

Genus of beetles

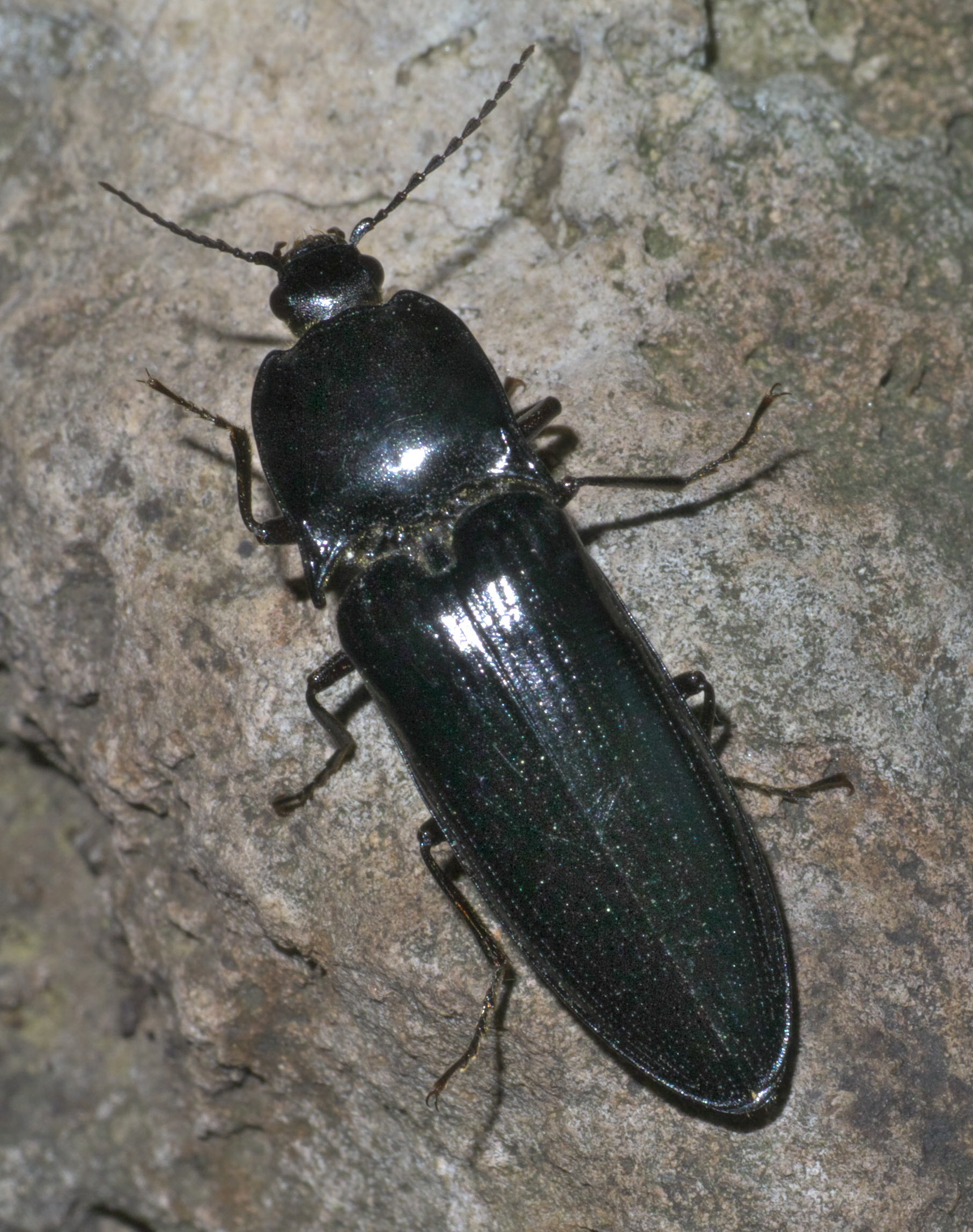
Melanactes

Melanactes is a genus of click beetles in the family Elateridae. There are about six described species in Melanactes, found in North America.

== Species ==
These six species belong to the genus Melanactes:

- Melanactes cockerelli Wickham, 1908
- Melanactes consors LeConte, 1853
- Melanactes densus LeConte, 1853
- Melanactes morio (Fabricius, 1798)
- Melanactes piceus (DeGeer, 1774)
- Melanactes puncticollis (LeConte, 1852)
