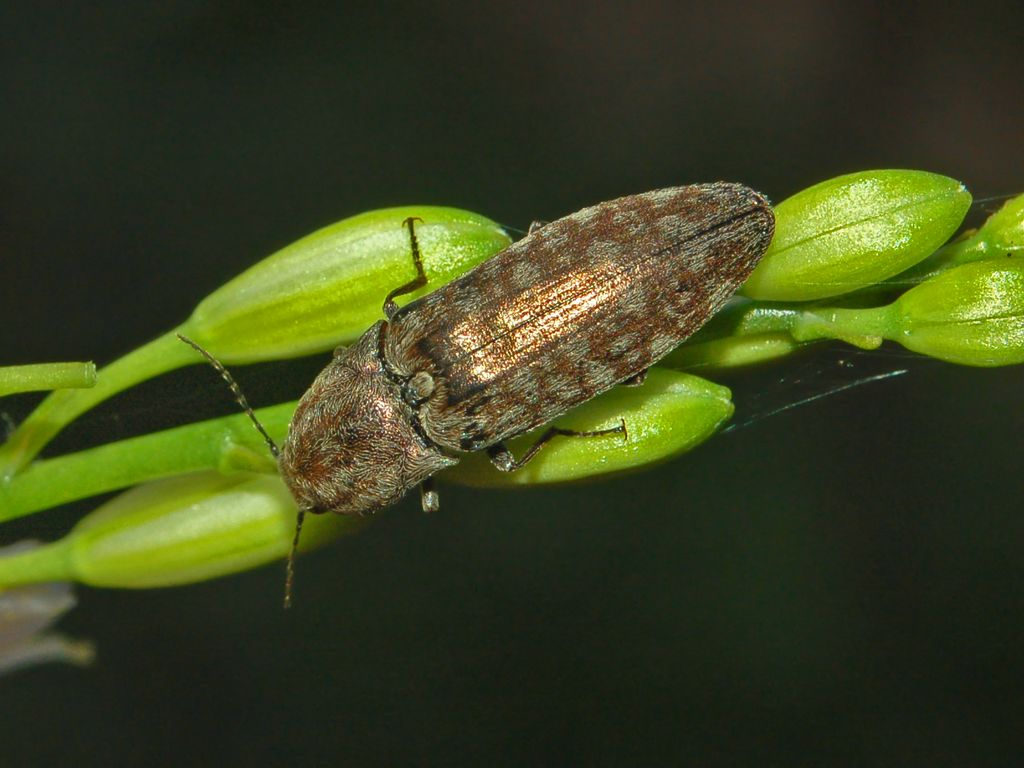
- Actenicerus siaelandicus

Scientific classification
- Kingdom: Animalia
- Phylum: Arthropoda
- Class: Insecta
- Order: Coleoptera
- Suborder: Polyphaga
- Infraorder: Elateriformia
- Family: Elateridae
- Tribe: Prosternini
- Genus: Actenicerus; Kiesenwetter, 1858

= Actenicerus =

Genus of beetles

Actenicerus is a genus of click beetles belonging to the family Elateridae, subfamily Dendrometrinae.

There are about 37 species, mostly distributed across the Northern Hemisphere. Of these, 26 are endemic to Japan.

== Species ==
- Actenicerus aerosus (Lewis, 1879)
- Actenicerus alternatus (Heyden, 1886)
- Actenicerus ashiaka Kishii, 1985
- Actenicerus athoides (Kishii, 1955)
- Actenicerus chokai (Kishii, 1966)
- Actenicerus defloratus (Schwarz, 1902)
- Actenicerus formosensis (Miwa, 1928)
- Actenicerus fruhstorferi (Schwarz, 1902)
- Actenicerus giganteus Kishii, 1975
- Actenicerus infirmus (Reitter, 1892)
- Actenicerus jeanvoinei Fleutiaux, 1936
- Actenicerus kiashianus (Miwa, 1928)
- Actenicerus kidonoi Ôhira, 2006
- Actenicerus kunimi (Kishii, 1966)
- Actenicerus kurilensis Dolin, 1987
- Actenicerus maculipennis (Schwarz, 1902)
- Actenicerus miyanourana (Kishii, 1968)
- Actenicerus montanus Kishii, 1998
- Actenicerus mushanus (Miwa, 1928)
- Actenicerus nagaoi Ôhira, 1967
- Actenicerus naomii Kishii, 1996
- Actenicerus nempta Kishii, 1996
- Actenicerus octomaculatus Kishii, 1978
- Actenicerus odaisanus (Miwa, 1928)
- Actenicerus ohbayashii Ôhira, 1964
- Actenicerus orientalis (Candèze, 1889)
- Actenicerus paulinoi (Desbrochers des Loges, 1873)
- Actenicerus pruinosus Motschulsky, 1861
- Actenicerus siaelandicus (O. F. Müller, 1764)
- Actenicerus suzukii (Miwa, 1928)
- Actenicerus taishu Kishii, 1996
- Actenicerus takeshii Arimoto, 1992
- Actenicerus tesselatus (Fabricius, 1775)
- Actenicerus toyoshimai Arimoto & Watanabe, 1993
- Actenicerus tsugaru Kishii, 1978
- Actenicerus yaku Nakane & Kishii, 1958
- Actenicerus yamashiro Kishii, 1998
