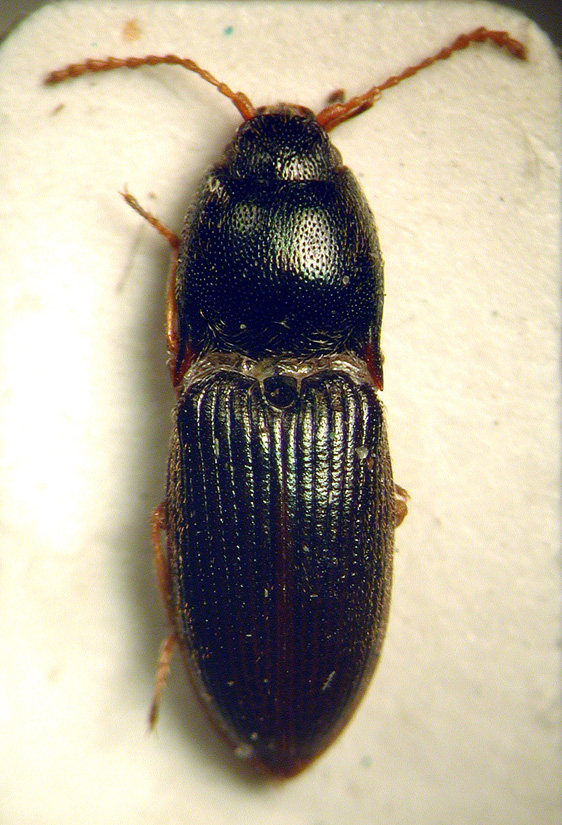
- Hypnoidus rivularius

Scientific classification
- Kingdom: Animalia
- Phylum: Arthropoda
- Class: Insecta
- Order: Coleoptera
- Suborder: Polyphaga
- Infraorder: Elateriformia
- Family: Elateridae
- Subfamily: Dendrometrinae
- Tribe: Hypnoidini
- Genus: Hypnoidus; Dillwyn, 1829

= Hypnoidus =

Genus of beetles

Hypnoidus is a genus of beetles belonging to the family Elateridae.

The species of this genus are found in Eurasia and Northern America.

Species:

- Hypnoidus abbreviatus (Say, 1823)
- Hypnoidus riparius (Fabricius, 1792)
