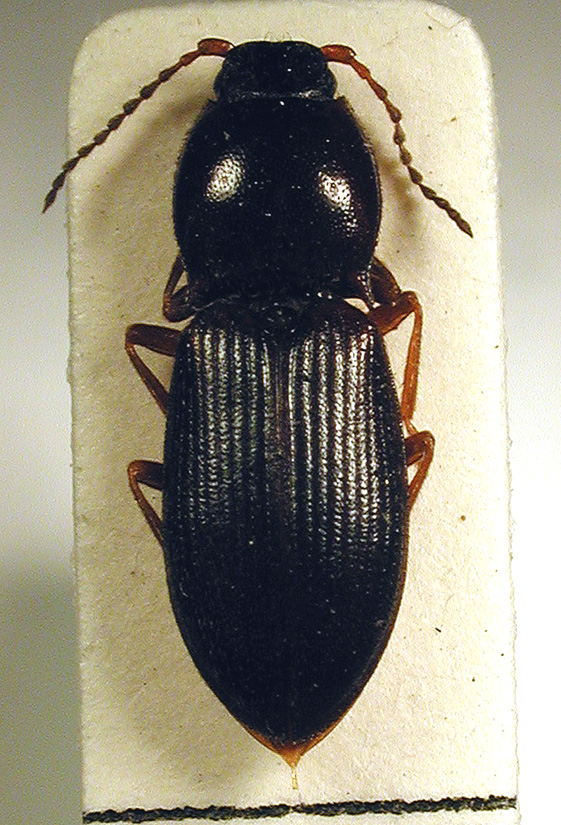
- Berninelsonius hyperboreus

Scientific classification
- Domain: Eukaryota
- Kingdom: Animalia
- Phylum: Arthropoda
- Class: Insecta
- Order: Coleoptera
- Suborder: Polyphaga
- Infraorder: Elateriformia
- Family: Elateridae
- Genus: Berninelsonius; Leseigneur, 1970

= Berninelsonius =

Genus of beetles

Berninelsonius is a genus of beetles belonging to the family Elateridae.

The species of this genus are found in Europe and Northern America.

Species:

- Berninelsonius hyperboreus (Gyllenhal, 1827)
