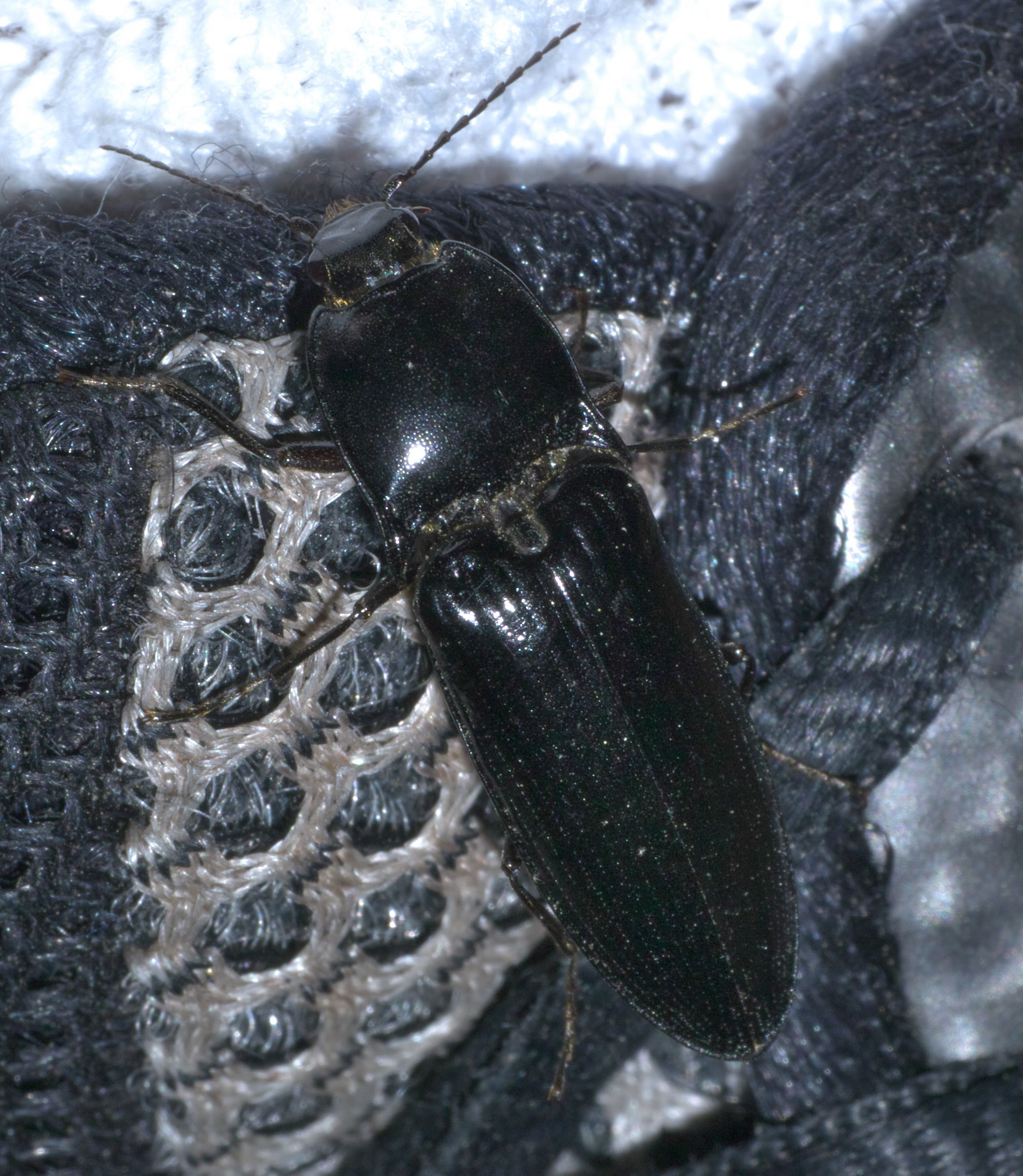
- Melanactes

Scientific classification
- Kingdom: Animalia
- Phylum: Arthropoda
- Class: Insecta
- Order: Coleoptera
- Suborder: Polyphaga
- Infraorder: Elateriformia
- Family: Elateridae
- Subfamily: Dendrometrinae
- Tribe: Oxynopterini; Candèze, 1857

= Oxynopterini =

Subfamily of beetles

Oxynopterini is a tribe of click beetles in the subfamily Dendrometrinae.

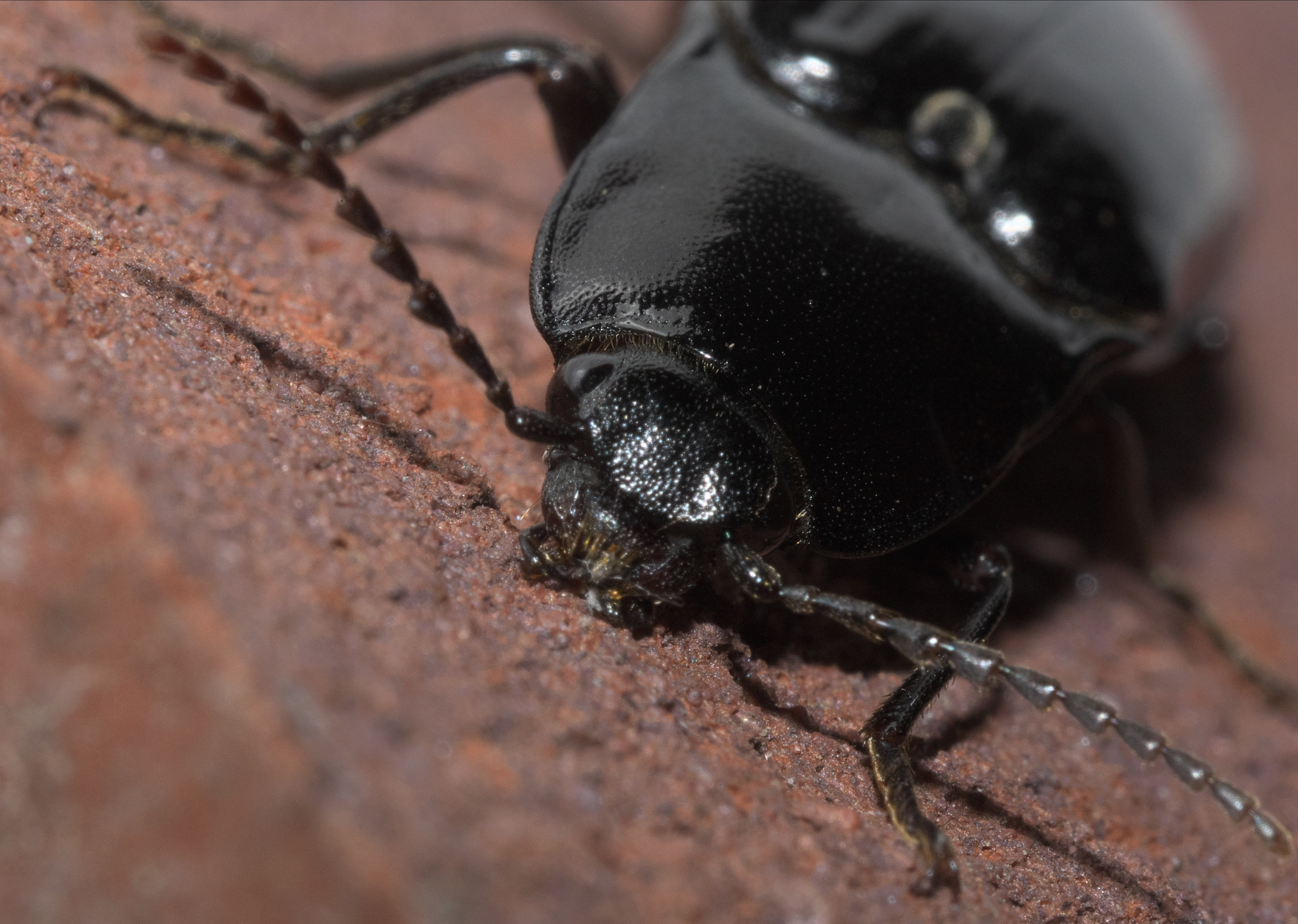
Melanactes piceus

== North American Genera ==
- Melanactes Leconte, 1854^{g b}
- Perissarthron Hyslop, 1918^{b}

Data sources: i = ITIS, c = Catalogue of Life, g = GBIF, b = Bugguide.net
