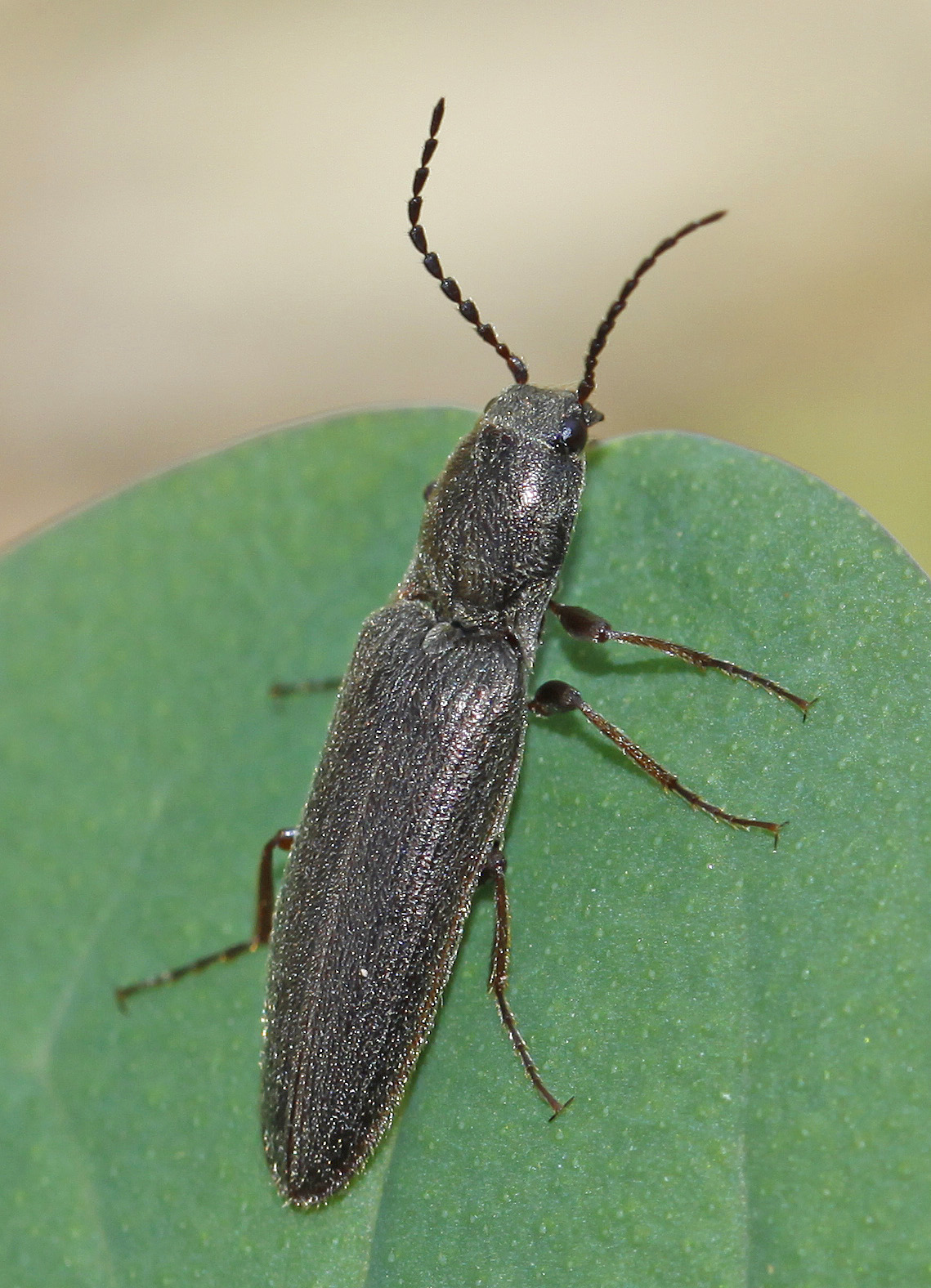
- Sylvanelater cylindriformis

Scientific classification
- Domain: Eukaryota
- Kingdom: Animalia
- Phylum: Arthropoda
- Class: Insecta
- Order: Coleoptera
- Suborder: Polyphaga
- Infraorder: Elateriformia
- Family: Elateridae
- Tribe: Prosternini
- Genus: Sylvanelater; Johnson in Majka & Johnson, 2008

= Sylvanelater =

Genus of beetles

Sylvanelater is a genus of click beetles in the family Elateridae. There are at least four described species in Sylvanelater.

== Species ==
These four species belong to the genus Sylvanelater:

- Sylvanelater cylindriformis (Herbst, 1806)^{g b}
- Sylvanelater furtivus (LeConte, 1853)^{g b}
- Sylvanelater limoniiformis (Horn, 1871)^{g}
- Sylvanelater mendax (LeConte, 1853)^{g b}

Data sources: i = ITIS, c = Catalogue of Life, g = GBIF, b = Bugguide.net
