= Harminius =

Scientific classification
- Kingdom: Animalia
- Phylum: Arthropoda
- Class: Insecta
- Order: Coleoptera
- Suborder: Polyphaga
- Infraorder: Elateriformia
- Family: Elateridae
- Genus: Harminius; Fairmaire, 1851

Genus of beetles

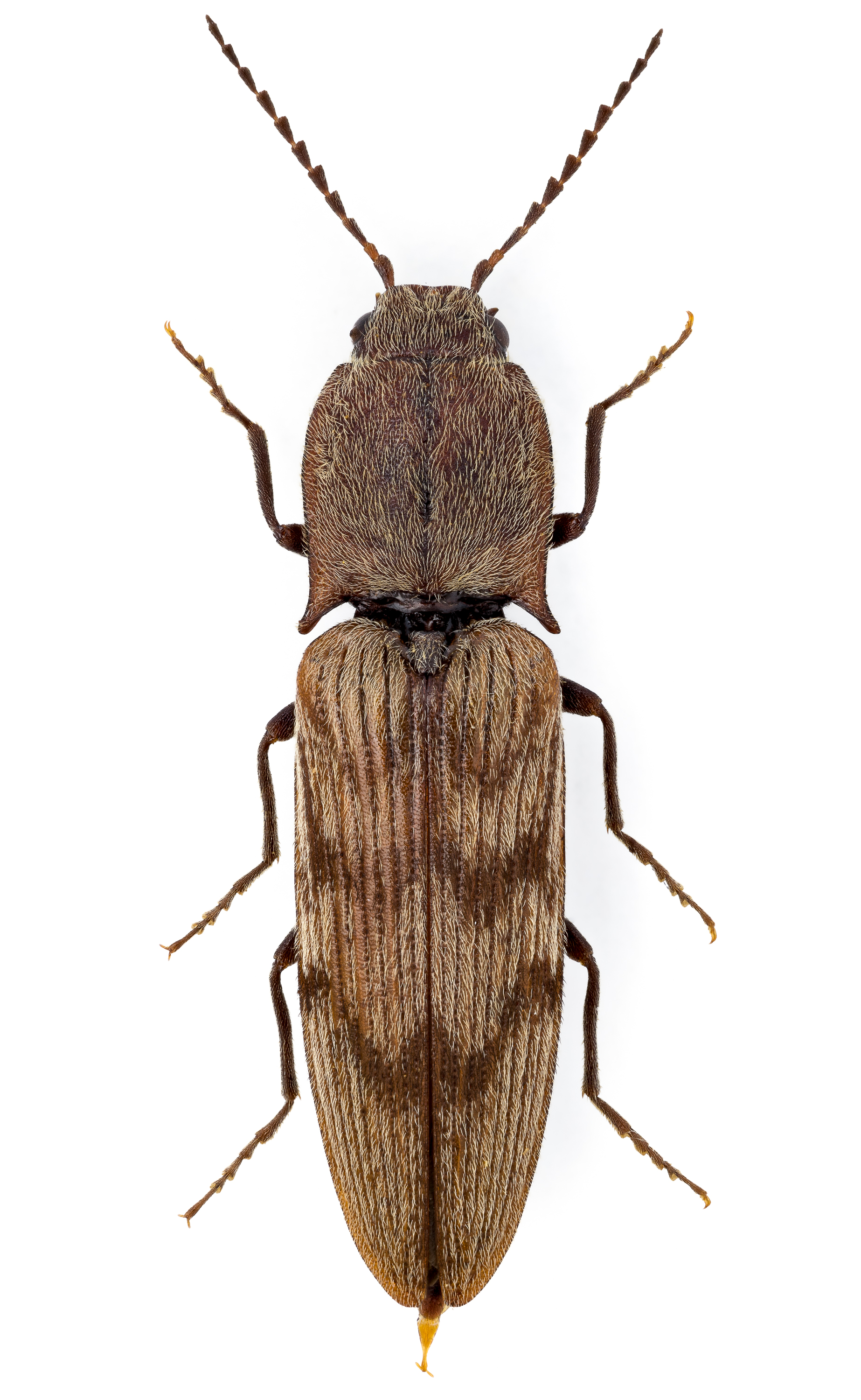
Harminius undulatus

Harminius is a genus of beetles belonging to the family Elateridae.

The species of this genus are found in Europe and Japan.

Species:

- Harminius gigas (Reitter, 1890)
- Harminius nihonicus
- Harminius singularis
- Harminius triundulatus (Mannerheim, 1853)
