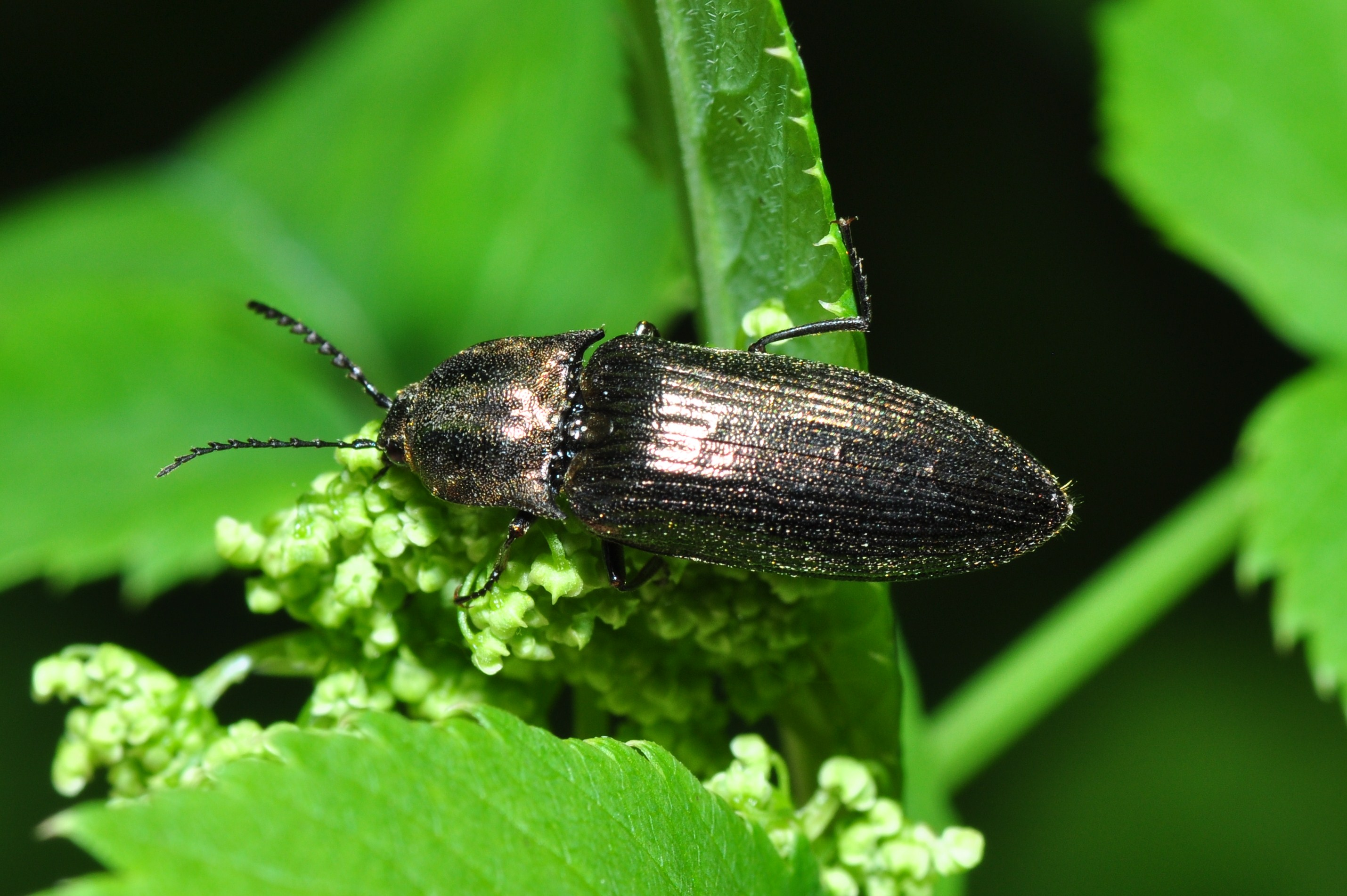
- Ctenicera sp.

Scientific classification
- Kingdom: Animalia
- Phylum: Arthropoda
- Clade: Pancrustacea
- Class: Insecta
- Order: Coleoptera
- Suborder: Polyphaga
- Infraorder: Elateriformia
- Family: Elateridae
- Subfamily: Dendrometrinae
- Tribe: Prosternini
- Genus: Ctenicera; Latreille, 1829

Synonyms
- Cleniocerus Stephens, 1829 (Missp.); Ctenicoerus Stephens, 1829 (Missp.); Ludius Eschscholtz, 1829; Ctenicerus Stephens, 1830 (Missp.); Ctinicerus Laporte, 1838 (Missp.); Corymbites Latreille, 1834; Euplastius Schwarz, 1903; Corymbetes Woodworth, 1913 (Missp.); Kudius Miwa, 1928; Cteniocerus Miwa, 1934 (Missp.); Ctenocera Stepanov, 1935 (Missp.)

= Ctenicera =

Genus of beetles

Ctenicera is a genus of click beetles.

== European species ==
European species within this genus include:

- Ctenicera bonomii Binaghi, 1940
- Ctenicera bosnica (Apfelbeck, 1894)
- Ctenicera cuprea (Fabricius, 1775)
- Ctenicera doderoi Binaghi, 1940
- Ctenicera heyeri (Saxesen, 1838)
- Ctenicera kiesenwetteri (Brisout, 1866)
- Ctenicera pectinicornis (Linnaeus, 1758)
- Ctenicera schneebergi Roubal, 1932
- Ctenicera virens (Schrank, 1781)

== Other selected species ==
- Ctenicera africanus (Schwarz, 1905)
- Ctenicera agriotoides (Sharp, 1877)
- Ctenicera antipodum (Candèze, 1863)
- Ctenicera aphrodite Szombathy, 1910
- Ctenicera aplastoides (Van Dyke, 1932)
- Ctenicera approximans Broun, 1912
- Ctenicera canaliculata Fairmaire, 1885
- Ctenicera currax Van Zwaluwenburg, 1963
- Ctenicera diversicolor (Eschscholtz, 1829)
- Ctenicera dubia (Sharp, 1877)
- Ctenicera euprepes (Zhang Junfeng, 1994)
- Ctenicera fulvescens Broun, 1912
- Ctenicera indentata Punam & Saini, 1996
- Ctenicera irregularis (Sharp, 1886)
- Ctenicera magnicollis (Fleutiaux, 1918)
- Ctenicera megops (White, 1874)
- Ctenicera misella (Boheman, 1851)
- Ctenicera moerens (LeConte, 1866)
- Ctenicera munda (Sharp, 1886)
- Ctenicera munroi (Broun, 1893)
- Ctenicera olivascens (White, 1874)
- Ctenicera philippii Fleutiaux, 1901
- Ctenicera rugosa (Fleutiaux, 1918)
- Ctenicera sincera (Zhang Junfeng, 1994)
- Ctenicera sjaelandica Dietrich, 1945
- Ctenicera sternalis Broun, 1912
- Ctenicera strangulata (White, 1874)
- Ctenicera subnitida (Fleutiaux, 1918)
- Ctenicera subnivosa Vats & Chauhan, 1992
- Ctenicera tarsalis (Melsheimer, 1844)
- Ctenicera vitticollis Broun, 1912
- Ctenicera xanthoma (Horn, 1871)

== See also ==
- List of click beetles of India
