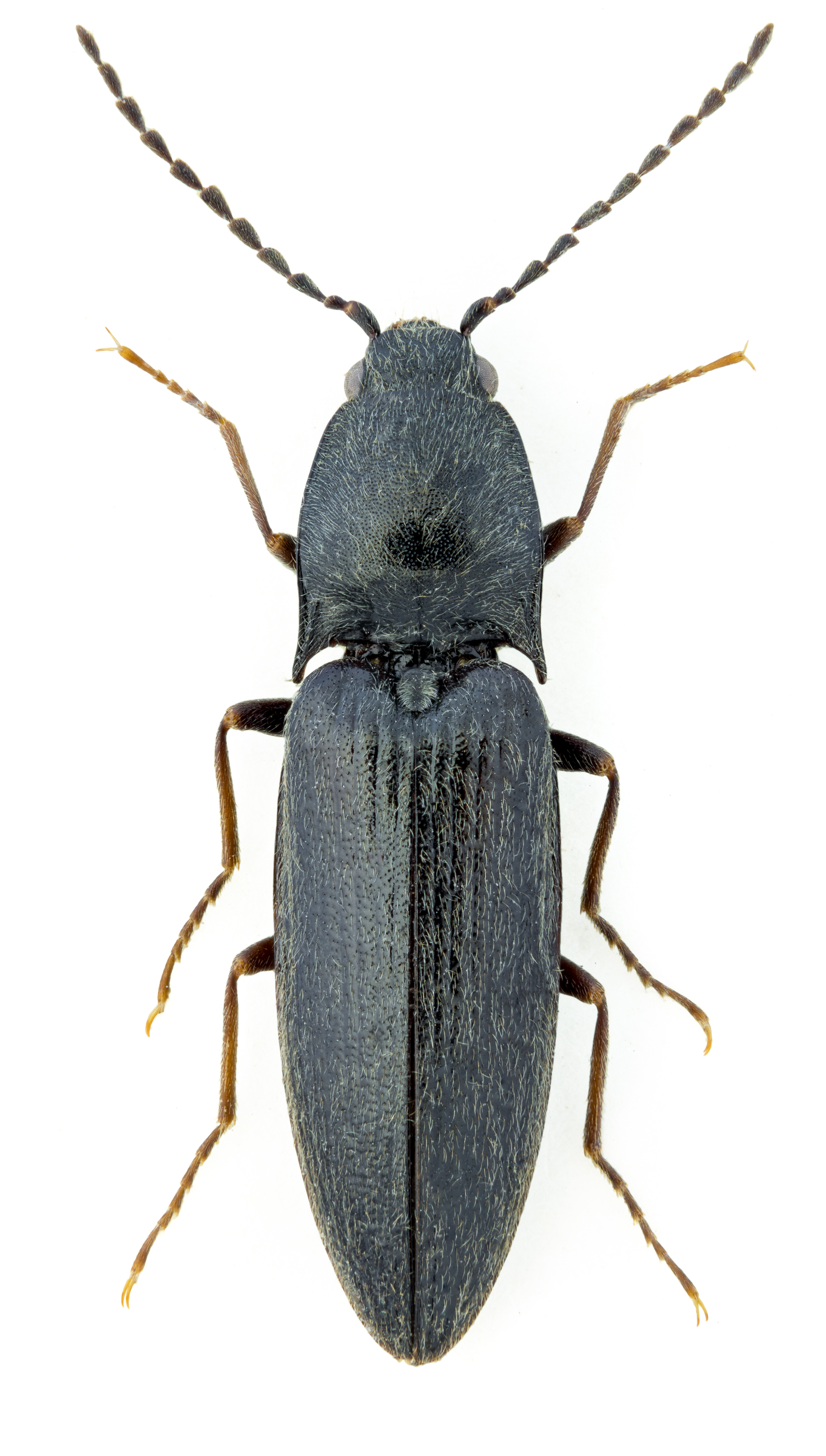
- Liotrichus affinis

Scientific classification
- Domain: Eukaryota
- Kingdom: Animalia
- Phylum: Arthropoda
- Class: Insecta
- Order: Coleoptera
- Suborder: Polyphaga
- Infraorder: Elateriformia
- Family: Elateridae
- Genus: Liotrichus; Kiesenwetter, 1858

Synonyms
- Actenicermorphus Park, 1989

= Liotrichus =

Genus of beetles

Liotrichus is a genus of beetles in the family Elateridae. The species of this genus are found in Eurasia, North America, and southern Africa.

== Species ==
The following species are recognised in the genus Liotrichus:

- Liotrichus affinis (Paykull, 1800)
- Liotrichus crestonensis (W.J.Brown, 1935)
- Liotrichus falsificus (LeConte, 1853)
- Liotrichus hypocrita
- Liotrichus ligneus
- Liotrichus sagitticollis (Eschscholtz, 1829)
- Liotrichus spinosus (LeConte, 1853)
- Liotrichus stricklandi (W.J.Brown, 1935)
- Liotrichus umbricola (Eschscholtz, 1829)
- Liotrichus umbripennis (LeConte, 1857)
- Liotrichus volitans (Eschscholtz, 1829)
- Liotrichus vulneratus (LeConte, 1863)
- BOLD:AAH2385 (Liotrichus sp.)
