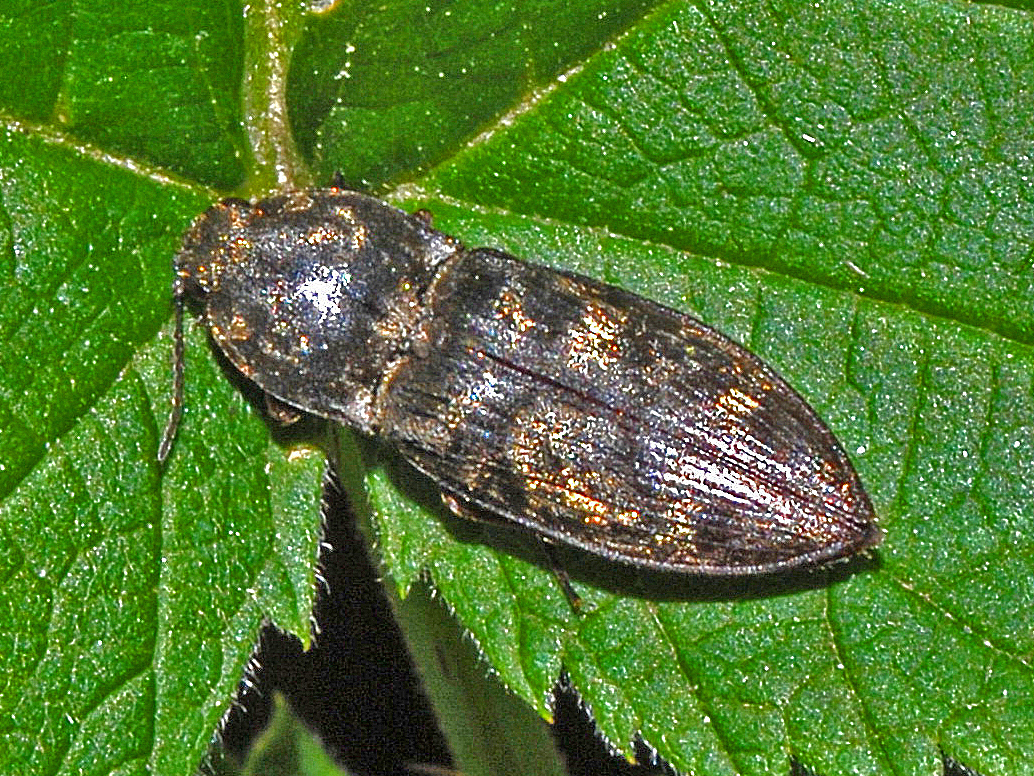
- Prosternon tessellatum

Scientific classification
- Kingdom: Animalia
- Phylum: Arthropoda
- Class: Insecta
- Order: Coleoptera
- Suborder: Polyphaga
- Infraorder: Elateriformia
- Family: Elateridae
- Genus: Prosternon; Latreille, 1834

= Prosternon =

Genus of beetles

Prosternon is a genus of click beetles belonging to the family Elateridae.

== Species ==
Species within this genus include:

- Prosternon admirabile Gurjeva, 1984
- Prosternon aurichalceum Stepanov, 1930
- Prosternon bombycinus (Germar, 1843)
- Prosternon chrysocomum (Germar, 1843)
- Prosternon egregium Denisova, 1948
- Prosternon fallax (Say, 1834)
- Prosternon hamata (Say, 1834)
- Prosternon hoppingi (Van Dyke, 1932)
- Prosternon medianus (Germar, 1843)
- Prosternon mirabilis (Fall, 1901)
- Prosternon montanum Gurjeva, 1980
- Prosternon semilutea (LeConte, 1853)
- Prosternon sericeum (Gebler, 1824)
- Prosternon syriacum Buysson, 1891
- Prosternon tessellatum (Linnaeus, 1758)
- Prosternon viduus (Brown, 1936)
