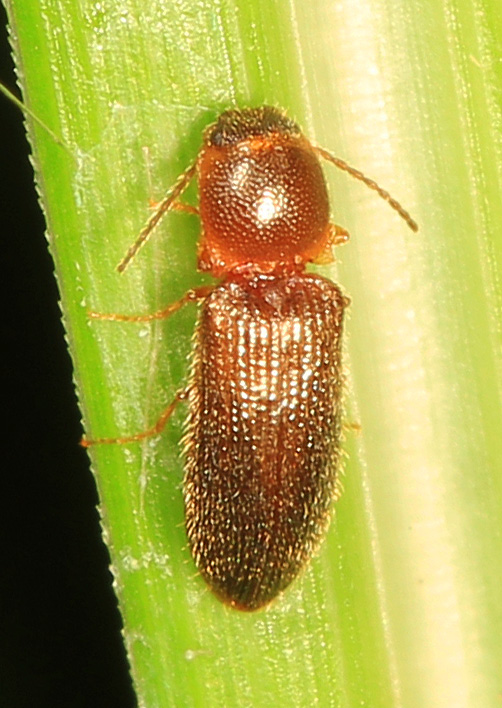
- Tetralimonius nimbatus

Scientific classification
- Kingdom: Animalia
- Phylum: Arthropoda
- Class: Insecta
- Order: Coleoptera
- Suborder: Polyphaga
- Infraorder: Elateriformia
- Family: Elateridae
- Subfamily: Dendrometrinae
- Tribe: Dendrometrini
- Genus: Tetralimonius; Etzler, 2019

= Tetralimonius =

Genus of beetles

Tetralimonius is a genus of click beetles in the family Elateridae, formerly included in the genus Limonius.

== Species ==
- Tetralimonius definitus (Ziegler, 1845)
- Tetralimonius humeralis (Candèze, 1860)
- Tetralimonius maculicollis (Motschulsky, 1859)
- Tetralimonius nimbatus (Say, 1825)
- Tetralimonius ornatulus (LeConte, 1857)
- Tetralimonius quercus (Olivier, 1790)
- Tetralimonius reitteri (Gurjeva, 1976)
