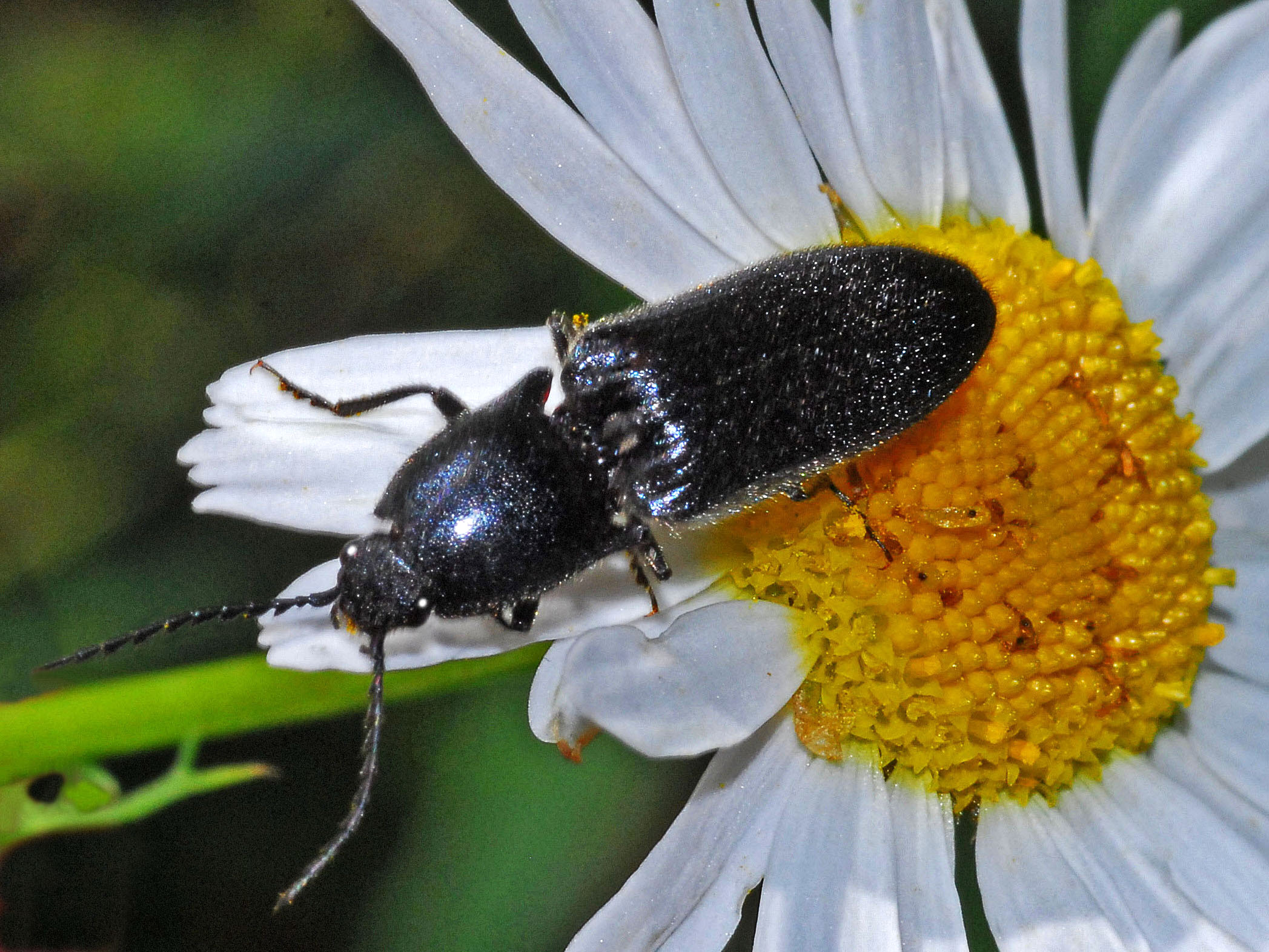
- Megathous nigerrimus

Scientific classification
- Domain: Eukaryota
- Kingdom: Animalia
- Phylum: Arthropoda
- Class: Insecta
- Order: Coleoptera
- Suborder: Polyphaga
- Infraorder: Elateriformia
- Family: Elateridae
- Subfamily: Dendrometrinae
- Tribe: Dendrometrini
- Genus: Megathous
- Species: M. nigerrimus

Binomial name
- Megathous nigerrimus (Desbrochers des Loges, 1869)

Synonyms
- Athous nigerrimus Desbrochers des Loges, 1870; Athous langsdorfi (Stierlin, 1880); Hemicrepidius nigerrimus (Desbrochers des Loges, 1869)

= Megathous nigerrimus =

Species of beetle

Megathous nigerrimus is a species of click beetles in the family Elateridae. In 2020, Frank E. Etzler transferred this species to the genus Hemicrepidius.

== Distribution ==
This species can be found in France, Italy and Switzerland. It is the most widespread species within the genus Megathous. It is mainly known from the French and Italian Maritime Alps, Alpes-de-Haute-Provence and Piedmont.

== Description ==
Megathous nigerrimus can reach a body length of about 20 mm (0.79 in). These click beetles are entirely black, moderately shiny, including antennae and legs. They are covered with fine and not very thick pubescence. Antennae are serrated from third article. Frons is arcuate anteriorly with margin simple on level with clypeus at middle.

== Biology ==
The larvae develop as predators in decayed trunks and stumps of different tree species. Adults have crepuscular habits.
