= Dendrometrini =

Scientific classification
- Domain: Eukaryota
- Kingdom: Animalia
- Phylum: Arthropoda
- Class: Insecta
- Order: Coleoptera
- Suborder: Polyphaga
- Infraorder: Elateriformia
- Family: Elateridae
- Subfamily: Dendrometrinae
- Tribe: Dendrometrini; Gistel, 1848

Subtribes
- Dendrometrina; Denticollina; Hemicrepidiina

Tribe of click beetles

Dendrometrini is a tribe of click beetles in the family Elateridae, including some formerly recognized subfamily or tribal-rank groups such as Athoinae, Denticollinae, and Hemicrepidiini now all reduced to subtribal rank.

== Selected genera ==
- Alcimathous
- Athous
- Cidnopus
- Crepidophorus
- Denticollis
- Diacanthous
- Elathous
- Gambrinus
- Harminius
- Hemicrepidius
- Limonius
- Megathous
- Miwacrepidius
- Nothodes
- Pheletes
- Pseudocrepidophorus
- Socotrelater
- Stenagostus
- Tetralimonius
- Yukara
