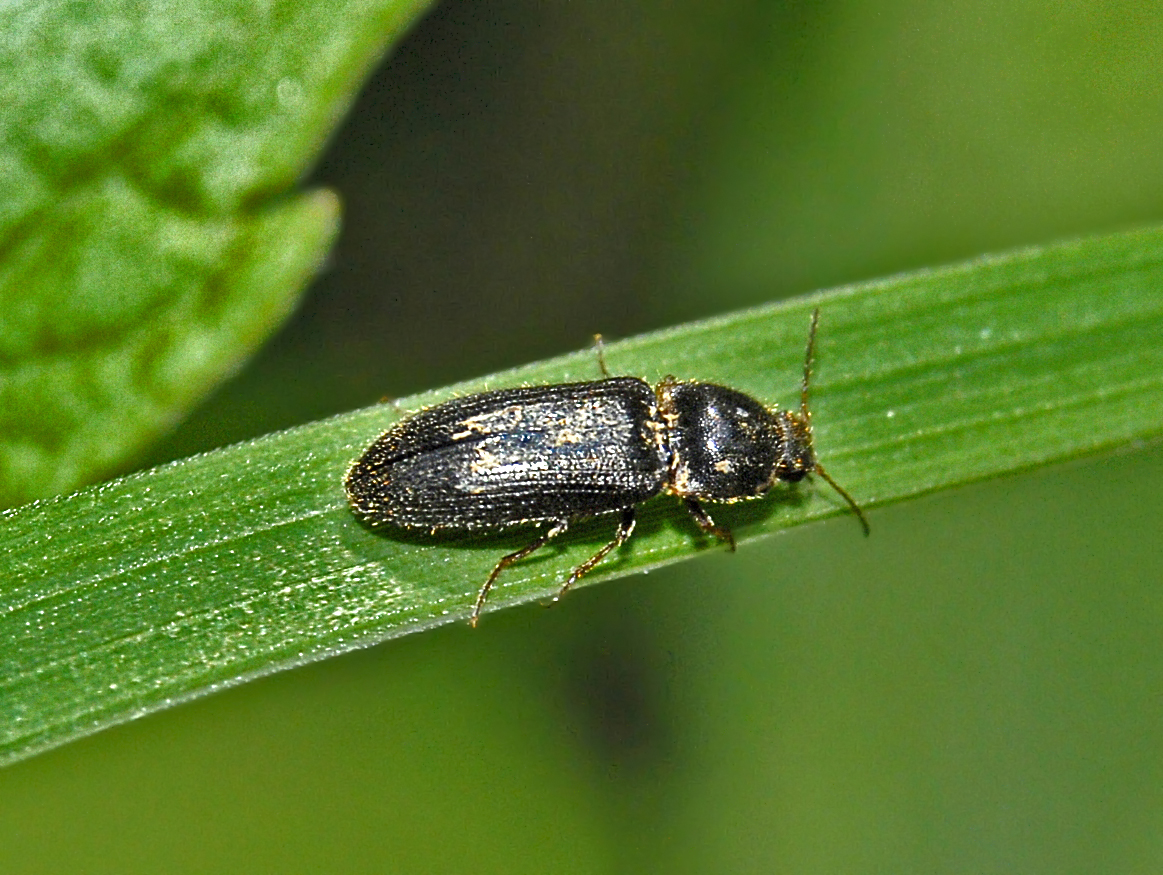

Scientific classification
- Kingdom: Animalia
- Phylum: Arthropoda
- Clade: Pancrustacea
- Class: Insecta
- Order: Coleoptera
- Suborder: Polyphaga
- Infraorder: Elateriformia
- Family: Elateridae
- Genus: Tetralimonius
- Species: T. quercus

Binomial name
- Tetralimonius quercus (Olivier, 1790)

Synonyms
- Limonius quercus (Olivier, 1790); Pheletes quercus (Olivier, 1790)

= Tetralimonius quercus =

Species of beetle

Tetralimonius quercus is a species of click beetle belonging to the family Elateridae, formerly placed in the genus Pheletes.

== Description ==
Tetralimonius quercus can reach a length of 4–6 millimetres (0.16–0.24 in). Adults can be found from late-April until June, feeding on grass, herbaceous plants and shrubs.

== Distribution and habitat ==
This species is present in most of Europe, Siberia and the Near East. Its habitat is lowlands and hilly regions, especially in dry and sunny areas.
