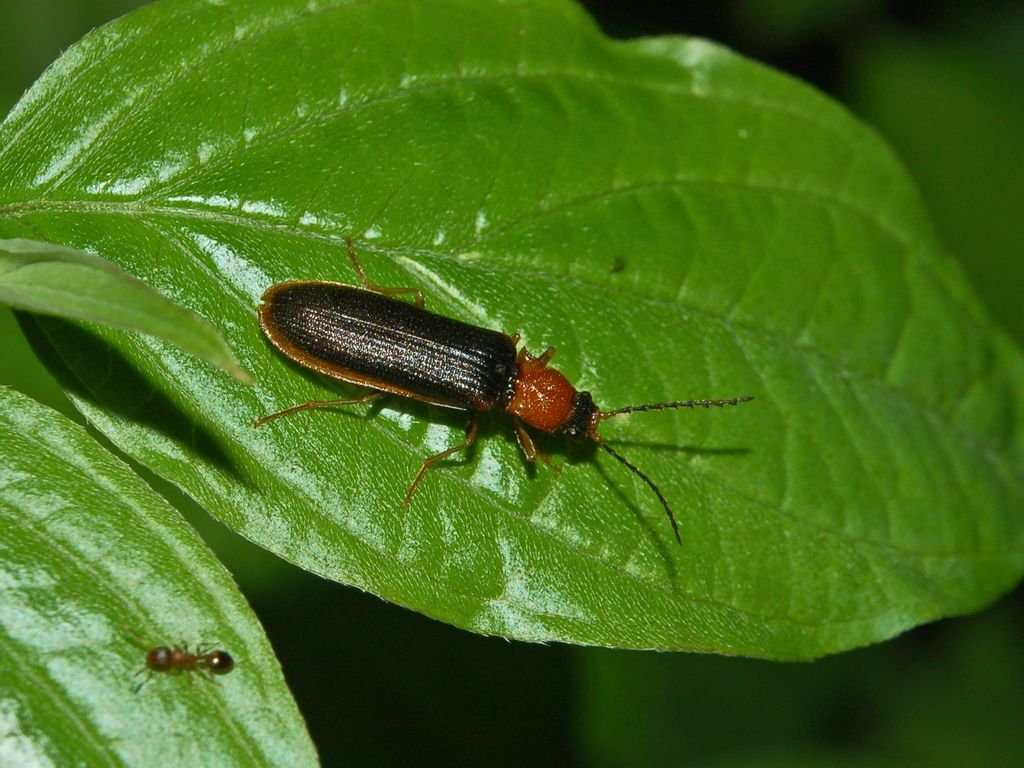
- Denticollis linearis - female

Scientific classification
- Kingdom: Animalia
- Phylum: Arthropoda
- Class: Insecta
- Order: Coleoptera
- Suborder: Polyphaga
- Infraorder: Elateriformia
- Family: Elateridae
- Genus: Denticollis
- Species: D. linearis

Binomial name
- Denticollis linearis (Linnaeus, 1758)

Synonyms
- Elater linearis Linnaeus, 1758

= Denticollis linearis =

Species of beetle

Denticollis linearis is a species of click beetle belonging to the family Elateridae subfamily Dendrometrinae.

This beetle is present in most of Europe, in the East Palearctic realm, the Nearctic realm, and the Near East.

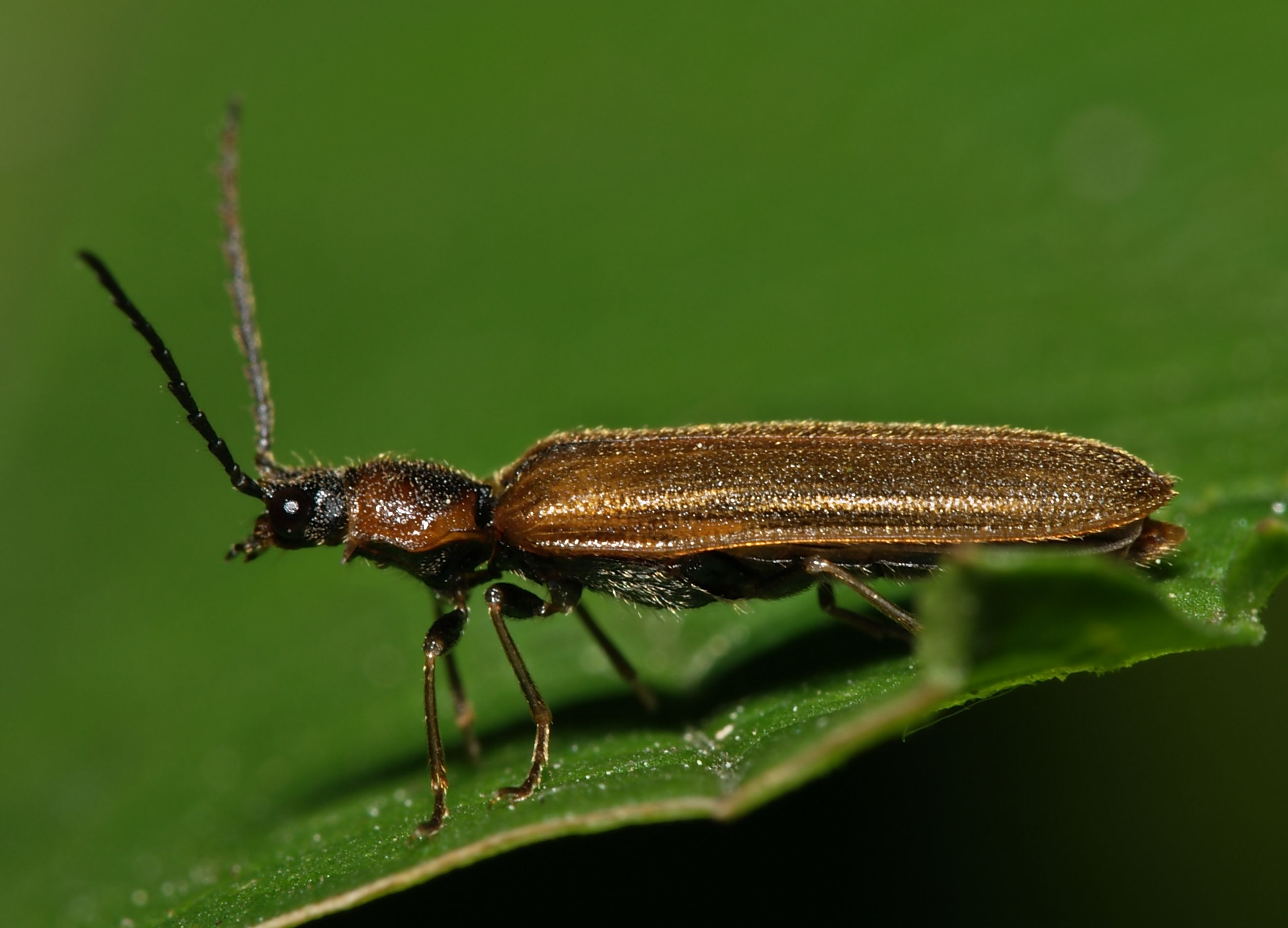
Lateral view

Denticollis linearis is quite similar to a Cantharidae species, but it can be distinguished from a soldier beetle by the two basal angles very protruding on pronotum and the deep longitudinal rows of pits.

The pronotum varies from orange-red to brownish, the elytra from dark-brown to yellowish, while the head and femora are generally blackish, the tarsi and tibia are orange-yellow.

The larvae are omnivorous, feeding on many different plants and other species larvae. The adults grow up to 9–13 millimetres (0.35–0.51 in) long and can mostly be encountered from May through July in broadleaved and coniferous host-trees.

== Subspecies ==
- Denticollis linearis var. mesomelas (Linnaeus)
- Denticollis linearis var. variabilis (DeGeer)
