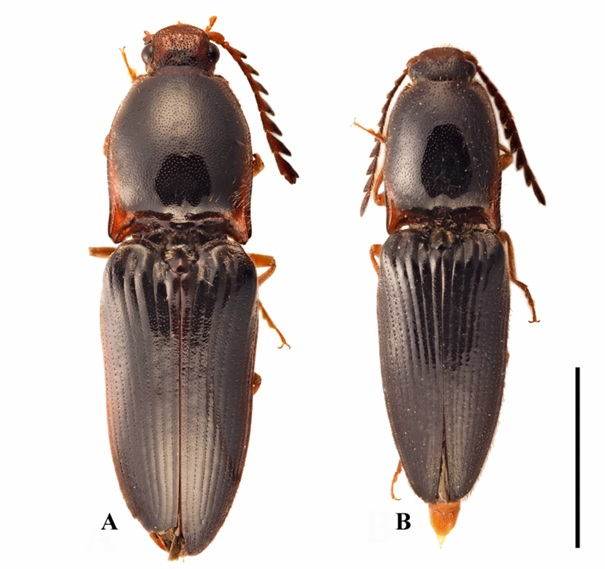
- Miwacrepidius rubriventris A: male; B: female

Scientific classification
- Domain: Eukaryota
- Kingdom: Animalia
- Phylum: Arthropoda
- Class: Insecta
- Order: Coleoptera
- Suborder: Polyphaga
- Infraorder: Elateriformia
- Family: Elateridae
- Subfamily: Dendrometrinae
- Tribe: Dendrometrini
- Subtribe: Hemicrepidiina
- Genus: Miwacrepidius; Ôhira, 1962

= Miwacrepidius =

Genus of beetles

Miwacrepidius is a genus of click beetle belonging to the family Elateridae.

== Species ==
- Miwacrepidius rubriventris Han & Park, 2013
- Miwacrepidius sichuanensis Platia & Pulvirenti, 2022
- Miwacrepidius subcyaneus (Motschulsky, 1866)

== Taxonomy ==
Miwacrepidius was initially treated as an independent genus, but was later regarded as a subgenus of and even a synonym of Hemicrepidius. However, in later work it was stated that Miwacrepidius possesses several distinct characters that differentiate it from Hemicrepidius, leading to its recovery as an independent genus.
