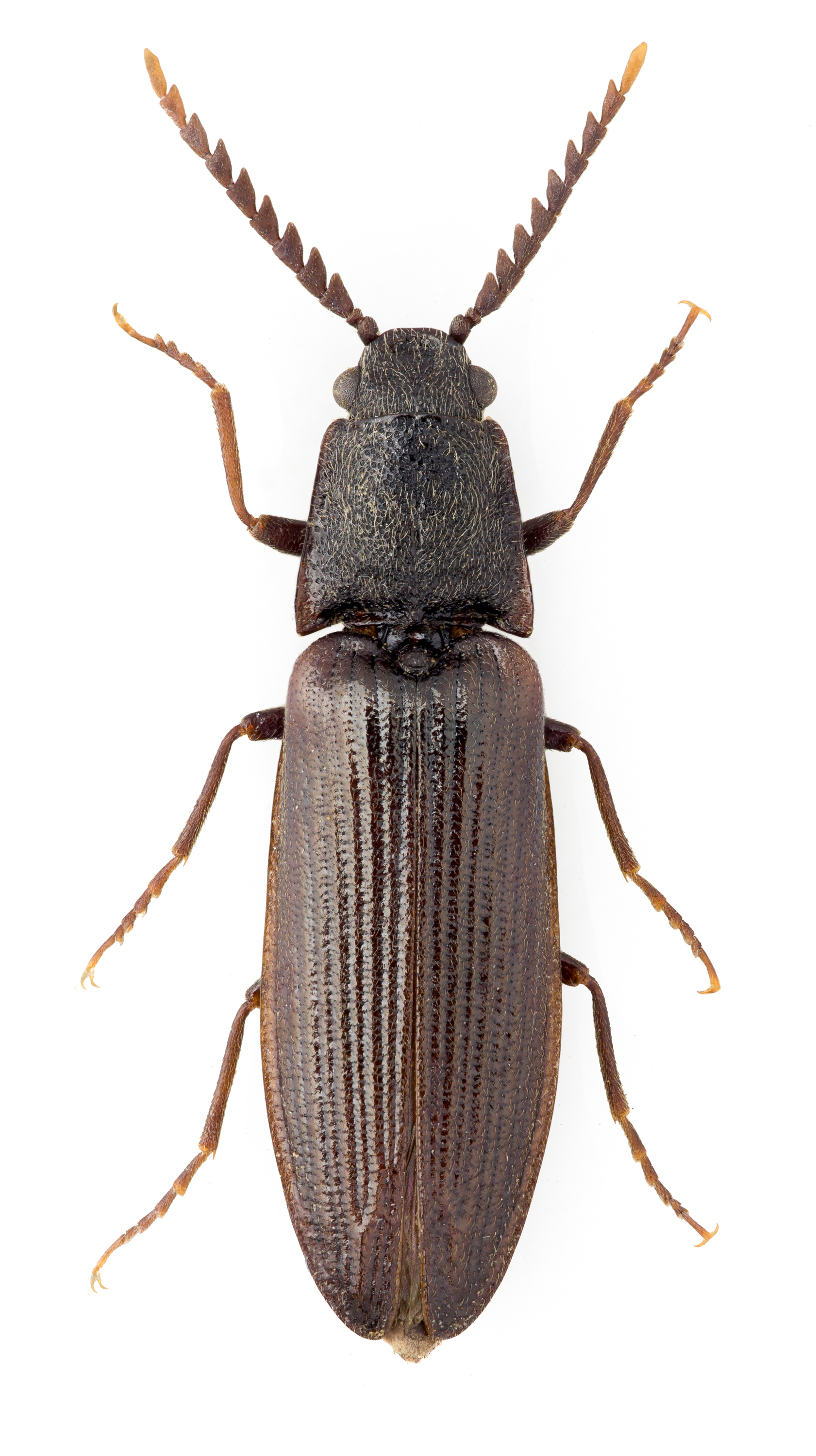
- Denticollis borealis

Scientific classification
- Domain: Eukaryota
- Kingdom: Animalia
- Phylum: Arthropoda
- Class: Insecta
- Order: Coleoptera
- Suborder: Polyphaga
- Infraorder: Elateriformia
- Family: Elateridae
- Subfamily: Dendrometrinae
- Tribe: Dendrometrini
- Genus: Denticollis; Piller & Mitterpacher, 1783

= Denticollis =

Genus of beetles

Denticollis is a genus of beetles belonging to the family Elateridae.

The species of this genus are found in Eurasia and North America.

Species:

- Denticollis linearis (Linnaeus, 1758)
