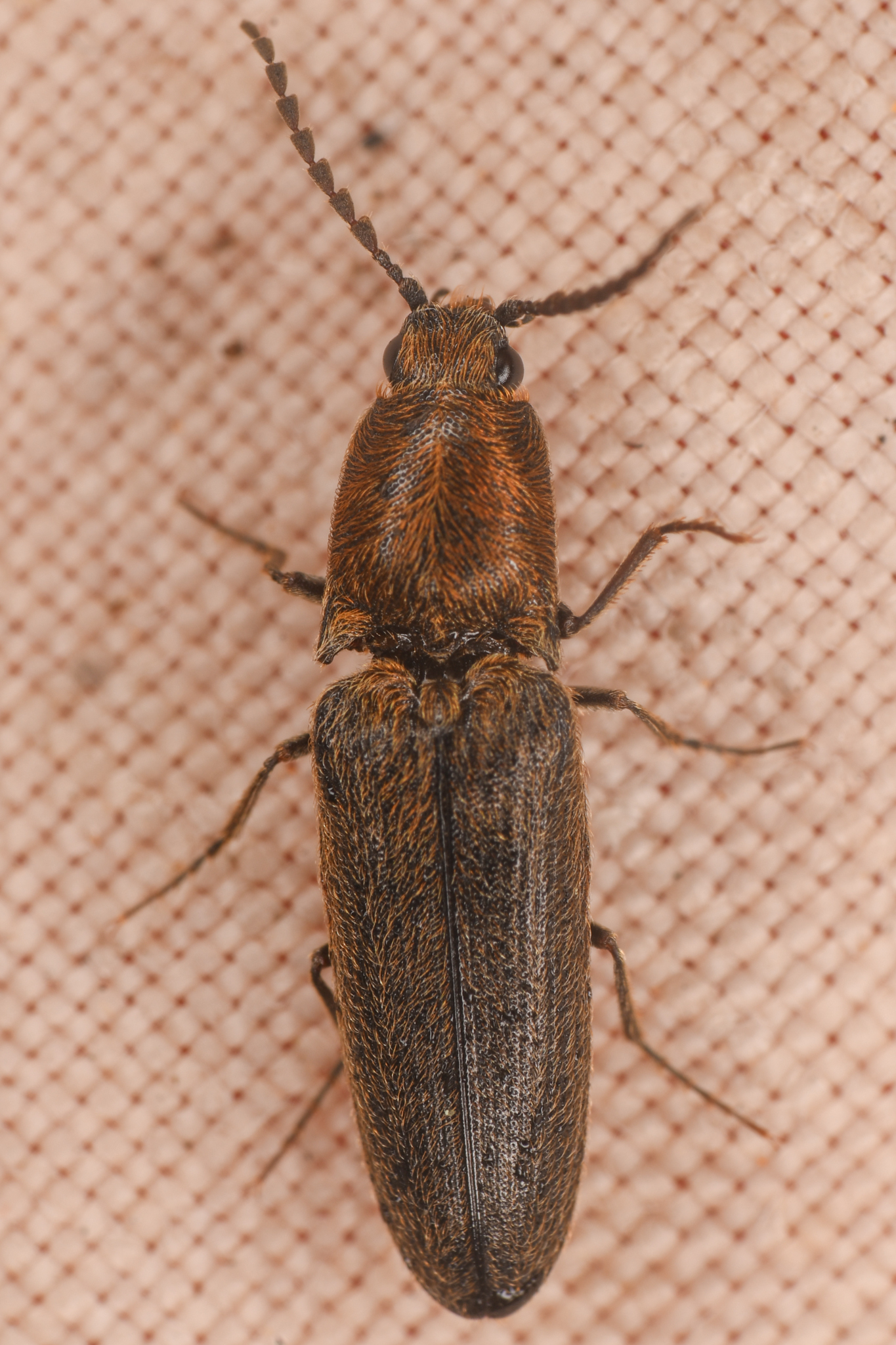
- Gambrinus fulvipilis

Scientific classification
- Domain: Eukaryota
- Kingdom: Animalia
- Phylum: Arthropoda
- Class: Insecta
- Order: Coleoptera
- Suborder: Polyphaga
- Infraorder: Elateriformia
- Family: Elateridae
- Tribe: Dendrometrini
- Genus: Gambrinus; LeConte, 1853

Synonyms
- Limoniscus Reitter, 1905; Sichuanelater Platia & Gudenzi, 2006

= Gambrinus (beetle) =

Genus of beetles

Gambrinus is a genus of click beetles in the family Elateridae, most of which were formerly included in the genus Limonius.

== North American Species ==
- Gambrinus clypeatus (Motschulsky 1859)
- Gambrinus confusus (LeConte, 1853)
- Gambrinus crotchi (Horn, 1872)
- Gambrinus flavomarginatus (Knull 1938)
- Gambrinus fulvipilis (Candèze, 1860)
- Gambrinus griseus (Palisot de Beauvois, 1805)
- Gambrinus humidus (Lane, 1941)
- Gambrinus lanchesteri (Lane, 1941)
- Gambrinus mirus (LeConte, 1853)
- Gambrinus pictus (Van Dyke, 1932)
- Gambrinus plebejus (Say, 1825)
- Gambrinus rudis (Brown, 1933)
- Gambrinus rufihumeralis (Lane, 1941)
- Gambrinus seminudis (Van Dyke, 1932)
- Gambrinus sinuifrons (Fall, 1907)
- Gambrinus stigma (Herbst, 1806)
- Gambrinus venablesi (Wickham, 1913)

== Selected Old World species ==
- Gambrinus violaceus (Müller, 1821)
