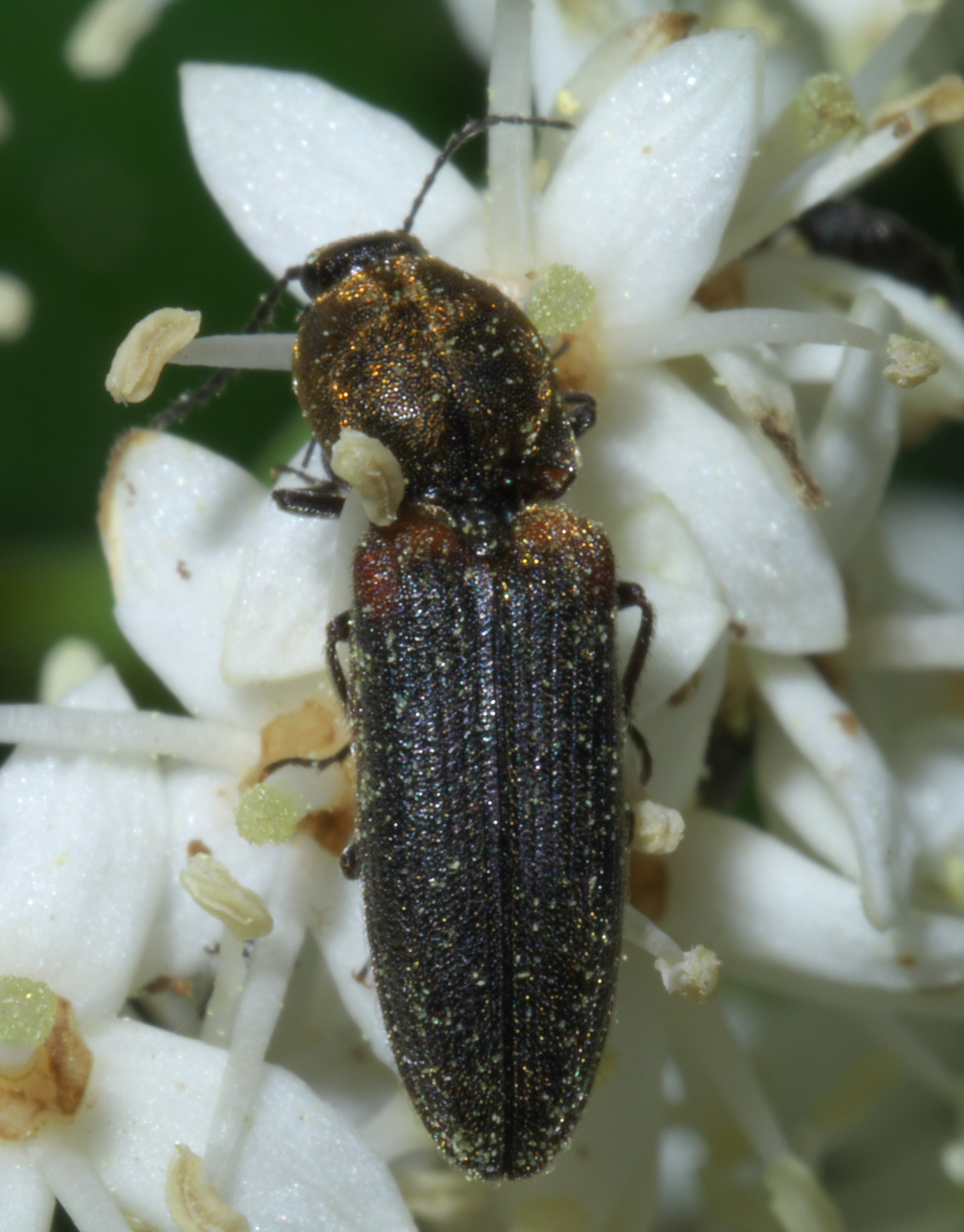

Scientific classification
- Domain: Eukaryota
- Kingdom: Animalia
- Phylum: Arthropoda
- Class: Insecta
- Order: Coleoptera
- Suborder: Polyphaga
- Infraorder: Elateriformia
- Family: Elateridae
- Genus: Limonius
- Species: L. auripilis

Binomial name
- Limonius auripilis (Say, 1823)

= Limonius auripilis =

Species of beetle

Limonius auripilis is a species of click beetle in the family Elateridae.
