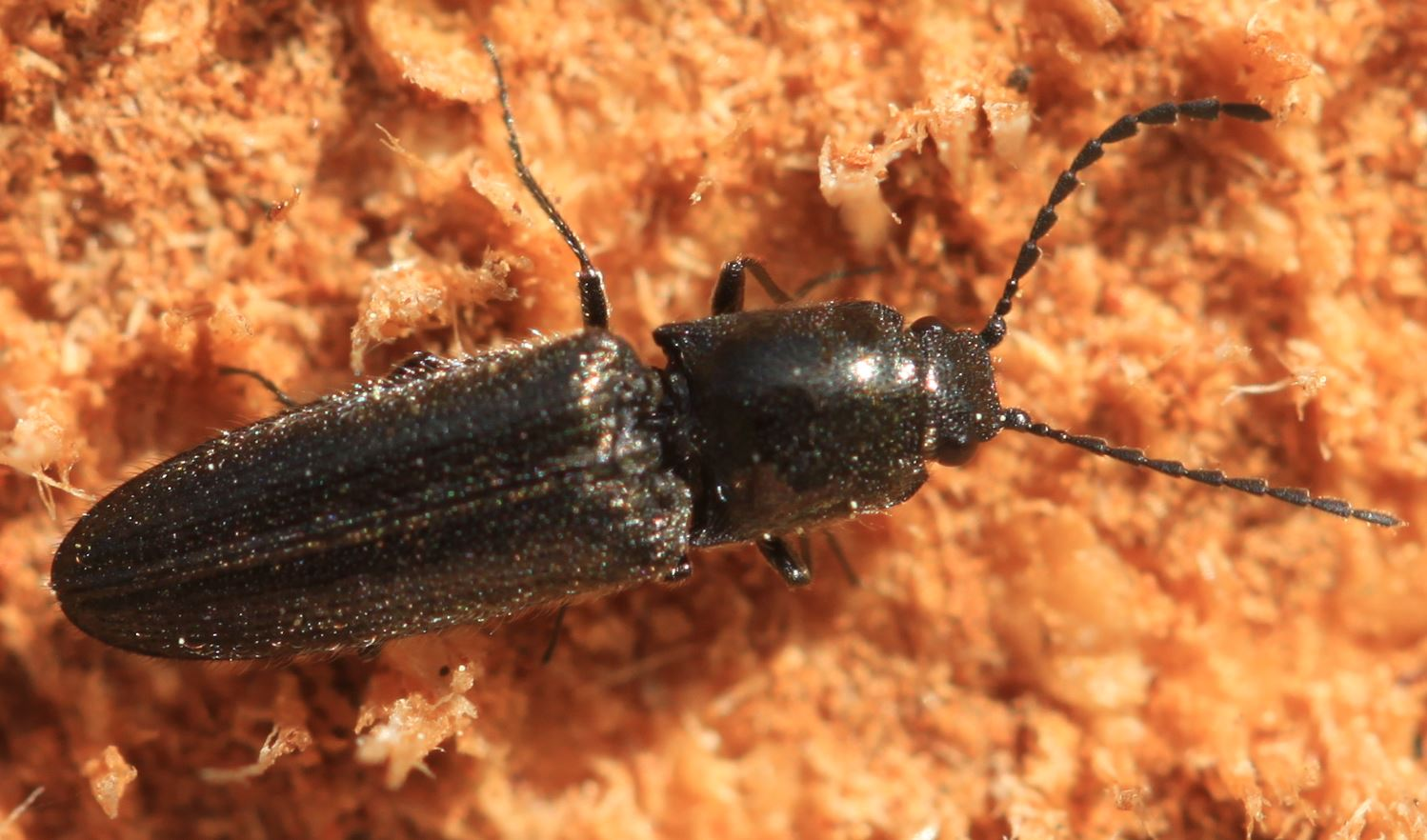

Scientific classification
- Kingdom: Animalia
- Phylum: Arthropoda
- Clade: Pancrustacea
- Class: Insecta
- Order: Coleoptera
- Suborder: Polyphaga
- Infraorder: Elateriformia
- Family: Elateridae
- Genus: Limonius
- Species: L. minutus

Binomial name
- Limonius minutus (Linnaeus, 1758)

Synonyms
- Cidnopus minutus (Linnaeus, 1758); Elater minutus Linnaeus, 1758; Kibunea minuta (Linnaeus, 1758)

= Limonius minutus =

Species of beetle

Limonius minutus is a species of beetle belonging to the family Elateridae.

It is native to Europe.
