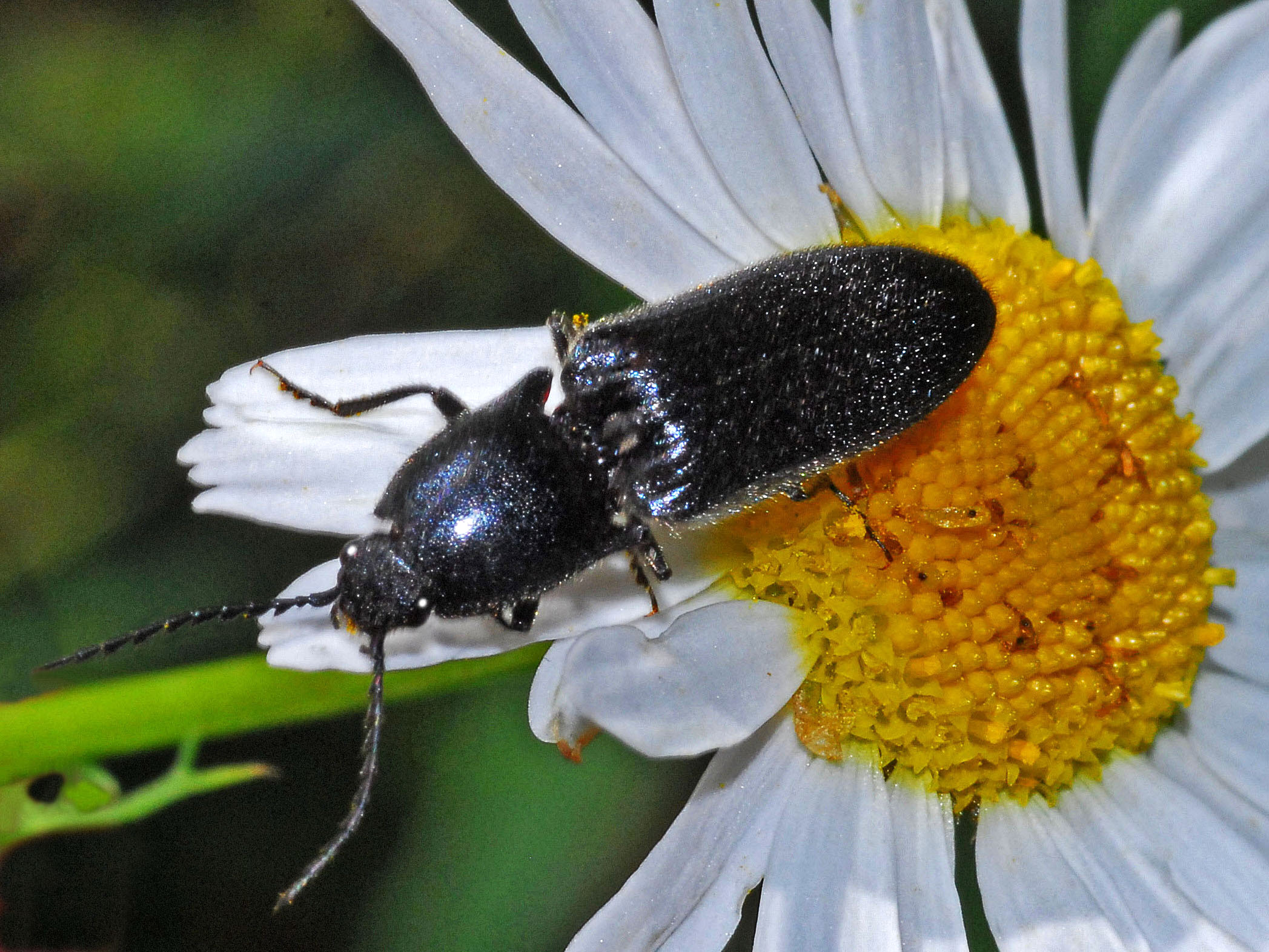

Scientific classification
- Kingdom: Animalia
- Phylum: Arthropoda
- Class: Insecta
- Order: Coleoptera
- Suborder: Polyphaga
- Infraorder: Elateriformia
- Family: Elateridae
- Subfamily: Dendrometrinae
- Tribe: Dendrometrini
- Genus: Megathous; Reitter, 1905

Synonyms
- Harmiathous Ôhira, 1993; Harminathous Kishii, 1955; Mehathous Cobos, 1969

= Megathous =

Genus of beetles

Megathous is a genus of click beetles in the family, Elateridae. It was originally established by Edmund Reitter as a subgenus of the genus Harminius Fairmaire, 1851. There are more than 10 described species in Megathous, found in the Palearctic.

== Species ==
These species belong to the genus Megathous:

- Megathous algirinus (Candèze, 1860)
- Megathous altaicus (Schwarz, 1900)
- Megathous barrosi (Méquignon, 1932)
- Megathous escalerai (Cobos, 1958)
- Megathous ficcuzzensis (Buysson, 1912)
- Megathous fiorii Platia & Marini, 1990
- Megathous hispanicus Platia & Gudenzi, 2005
- Megathous lizlerwerneri Mertlik, 2005
- Megathous menetriesi (Reitter, 1890)
- Megathous peyerimhoffi Buysson, 1917
- Megathous pici (Buysson, 1898)
- Megathous rifensis (Cobos, 1969)
- Megathous sedakovii (Mannerheim, 1852)
- Megathous suturalis (Candèze, 1873)
- Megathous valtopinensis Platia & Gudenzi, 2005

== Excluded species ==
The following 3 species were transferred to the genus Hemicrepidius by Frank E. Etzler in 2020.

- Hemicrepidius dauricus (Mannerheim, 1852) (syn. Megathous dauricus (Mannerheim, 1852))
- Hemicrepidius jacobsoni (Reitter, 1905) (syn. Megathous jacobsoni (Reitter, 1905))
- Hemicrepidius nigerrimus (Desbrochers des Loges, 1869) (syn. Megathous nigerrimus (Desbrochers des Loges, 1869))
