= Limonius agonus =

Scientific classification
- Domain: Eukaryota
- Kingdom: Animalia
- Phylum: Arthropoda
- Class: Insecta
- Order: Coleoptera
- Suborder: Polyphaga
- Infraorder: Elateriformia
- Family: Elateridae
- Genus: Limonius
- Species: L. agonus

Binomial name
- Limonius agonus (Say)

Species of beetle

Limonius agonus, the eastern field wireworm, is a species of click beetle in the family Elateridae. It is found in North America.
