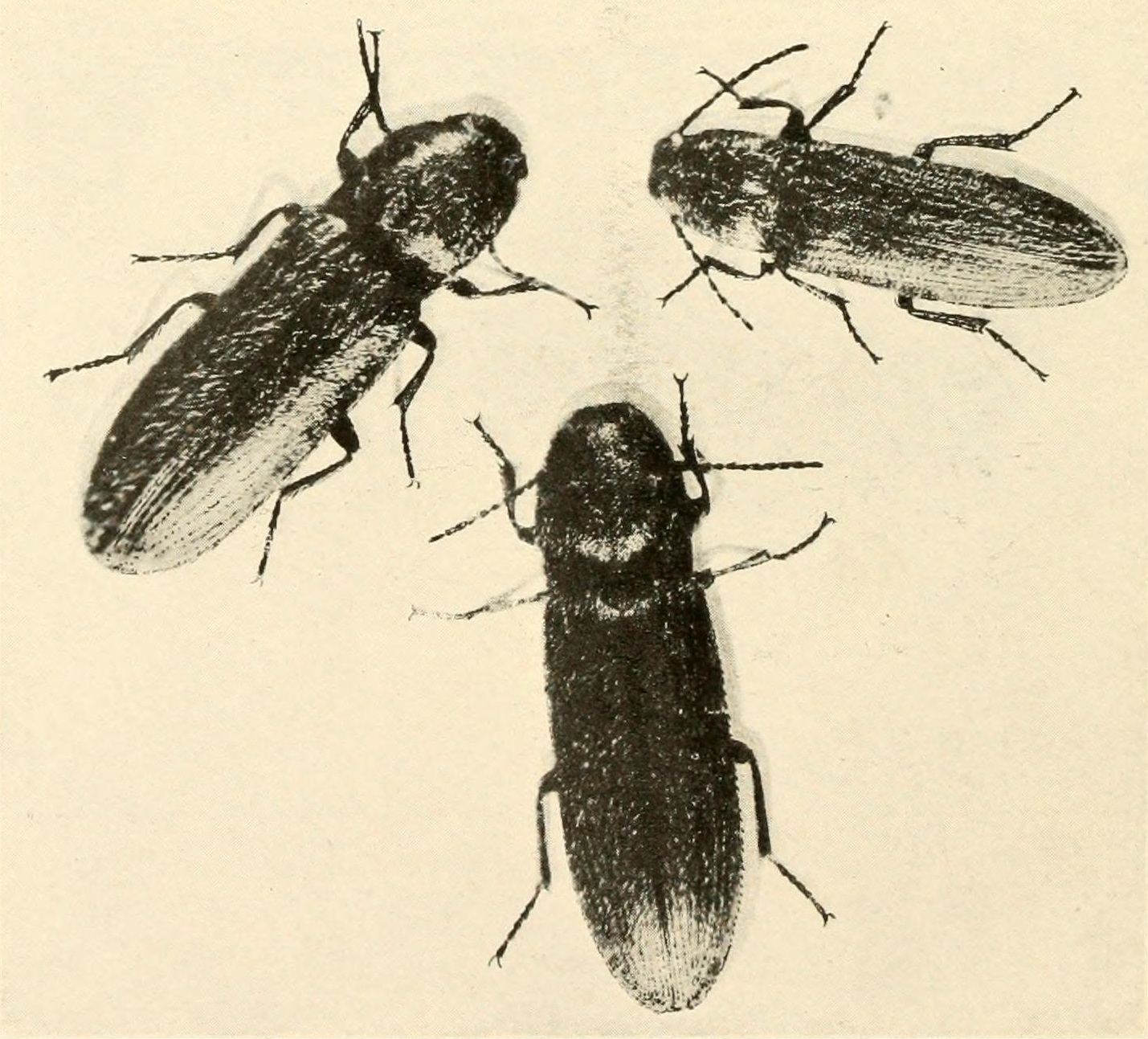

Scientific classification
- Domain: Eukaryota
- Kingdom: Animalia
- Phylum: Arthropoda
- Class: Insecta
- Order: Coleoptera
- Suborder: Polyphaga
- Infraorder: Elateriformia
- Family: Elateridae
- Genus: Limonius
- Species: L. californicus

Binomial name
- Limonius californicus (Mannerheim)

= Limonius californicus =

Species of beetle

Limonius californicus, the sugarbeet wireworm, is a species of click beetle in the family Elateridae.
