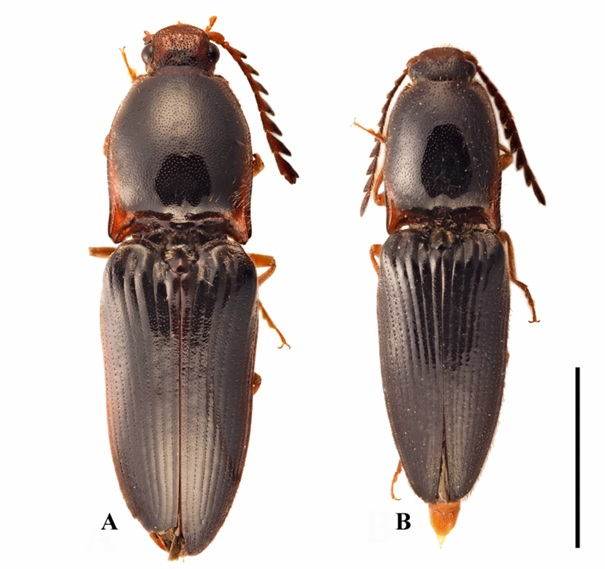
- A: male; B: female

Scientific classification
- Domain: Eukaryota
- Kingdom: Animalia
- Phylum: Arthropoda
- Class: Insecta
- Order: Coleoptera
- Suborder: Polyphaga
- Infraorder: Elateriformia
- Family: Elateridae
- Genus: Miwacrepidius
- Species: M. rubriventris

Binomial name
- Miwacrepidius rubriventris Han & Park, 2013

Synonyms
- Hemicrepidius (Miwacrepidius) rubriventris Han & Park, 2013

= Miwacrepidius rubriventris =

Species of beetle

Miwacrepidius rubriventris is a species of beetle of the Elateridae family. This species is found in South Korea and China (Liaoning, Sichuan, Shaanxi).

Adults reach a length of 12.5–19.9 mm. The dorsal surface is predominantly black, with reddish-brown areas on the antennae. Furthermore, the distal half of the head, margins of the pronotum and the basal portion of the elytra are also reddish-brown.
