= Limonius subauratus =

Scientific classification
- Domain: Eukaryota
- Kingdom: Animalia
- Phylum: Arthropoda
- Class: Insecta
- Order: Coleoptera
- Suborder: Polyphaga
- Infraorder: Elateriformia
- Family: Elateridae
- Genus: Limonius
- Species: L. subauratus

Binomial name
- Limonius subauratus Leconte

Species of beetle

Limonius subauratus, the Columbia basin wireworm, is a species of click beetle in the family Elateridae. It is found in North America.
