= Limonius infuscatus =

Scientific classification
- Kingdom: Animalia
- Phylum: Arthropoda
- Class: Insecta
- Order: Coleoptera
- Suborder: Polyphaga
- Infraorder: Elateriformia
- Family: Elateridae
- Genus: Limonius
- Species: L. infuscatus

Binomial name
- Limonius infuscatus (Motschulsky, 1859)

Species of beetle

Limonius infuscatus, the Western field wireworm, is a nocturnal species of click beetle in the family Elateridae and native to the northwestern United States.
