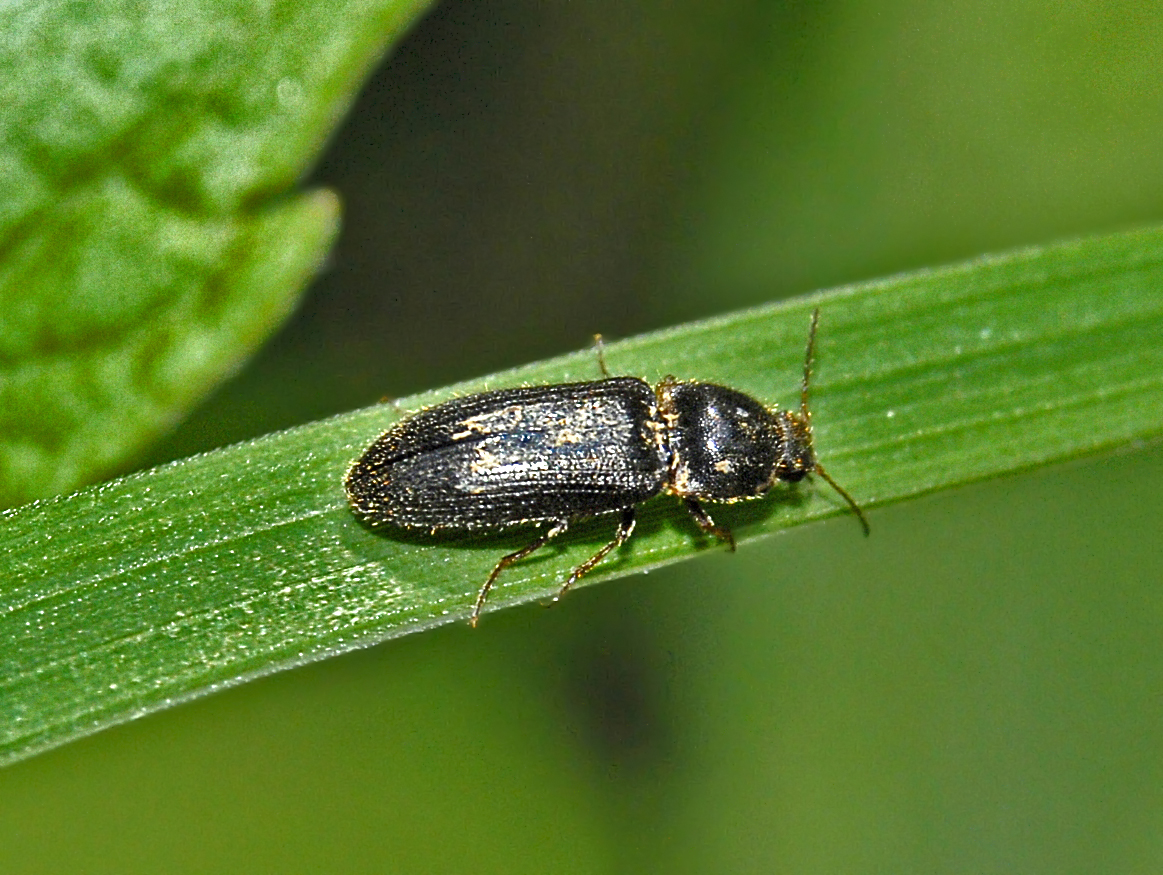
- Pheletes quercus

Scientific classification
- Domain: Eukaryota
- Kingdom: Animalia
- Phylum: Arthropoda
- Class: Insecta
- Order: Coleoptera
- Suborder: Polyphaga
- Infraorder: Elateriformia
- Family: Elateridae
- Subfamily: Dendrometrinae
- Genus: Pheletes; Kiesenwetter, 1858

Synonyms
- Hammionus Gistel, 1834 (nec Charpentier, 1825)

= Pheletes =

Genus of beetles

Pheletes is a genus of click beetle belonging to the family Elateridae.

== Species ==
- Pheletes aeneoniger (DeGeer, 1774)
- Pheletes lecontei (Lane, 1971)
