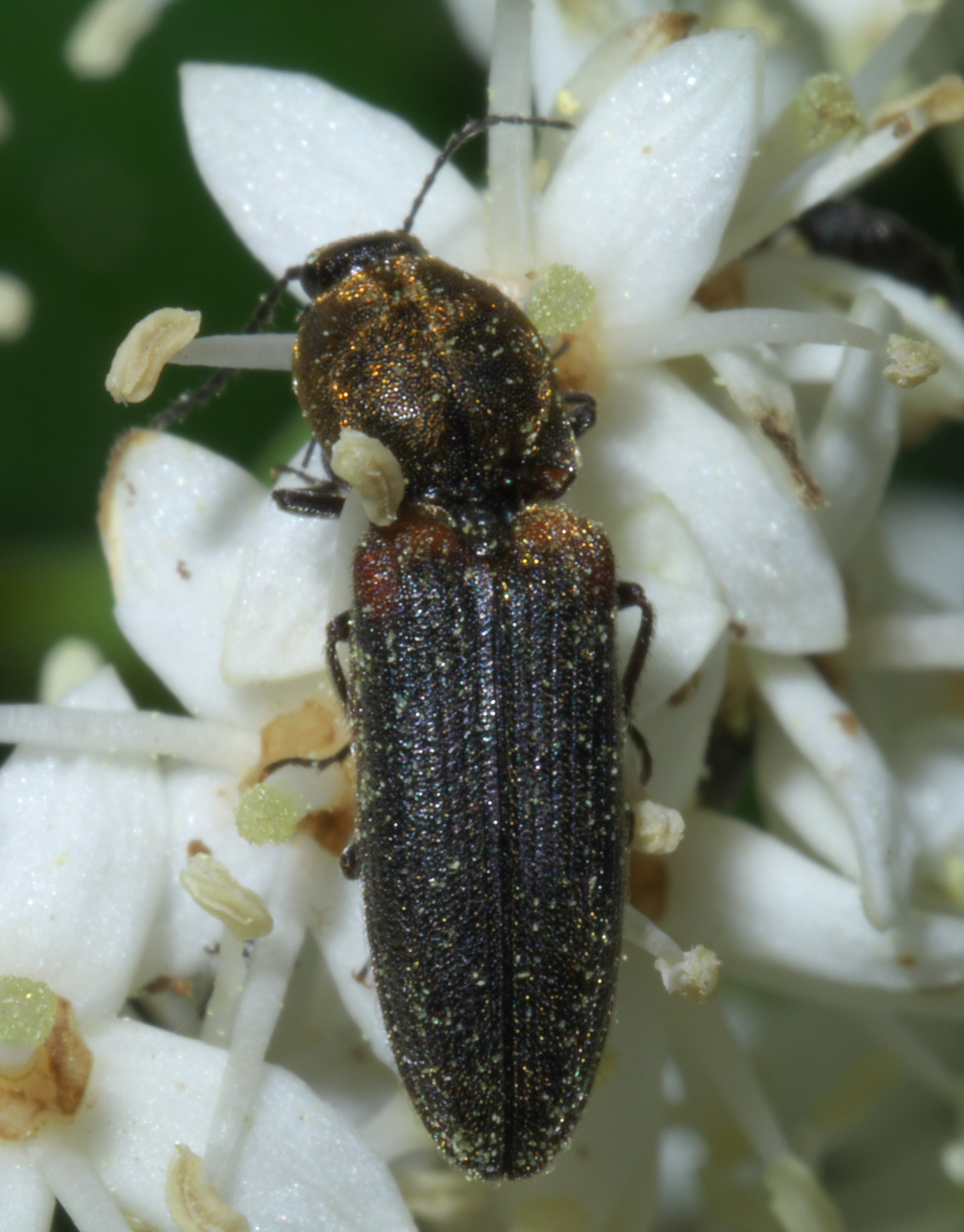
- Limonius auripilis

Scientific classification
- Kingdom: Animalia
- Phylum: Arthropoda
- Clade: Pancrustacea
- Class: Insecta
- Order: Coleoptera
- Suborder: Polyphaga
- Infraorder: Elateriformia
- Family: Elateridae
- Subfamily: Dendrometrinae
- Genus: Limonius; Eschscholtz, 1829

Synonyms
- Micrathous Lane, 1971; Solskyana Dolin, 1978; Neoathousius Schimmel & Platia, 1991

= Limonius =

Limonius Temporal range: Ypresian - Recent

Genus of beetles

Limonius is a genus of click beetles in the family Elateridae. Many of the species formerly placed in this genus have been removed to other genera such as Gambrinus.

== Species ==
- Limonius aeger LeConte, 1853
- Limonius agonus (Say) (eastern field wireworm)
- Limonius anceps LeConte, 1853
- Limonius aurifer LeConte, 1853
- Limonius auripilis (Say, 1823)
- Limonius basilaris
- Limonius californicus (Mannerheim) (sugarbeet wireworm)
- Limonius canus Leconte (Pacific coast wireworm)
- Limonius consimilis
- Limonius ectypus (Say, 1839)
- †Limonius impunctus Scudder, 1895 (Ypresian, Allenby Formation)
- Limonius infuscatus Motschulsky
- Limonius jonesi Lane, 1965
- Limonius lanei Van Dyke, 1932
- Limonius meridianus Knull, 1947
- Limonius minutus (Linnaeus, 1758)
- Limonius nitidulus Horn, 1871
- Limonius pectoralis LeConte, 1866
- Limonius quercinus (Say, 1825)
- Limonius subauratus Leconte (Columbia basin wireworm)
