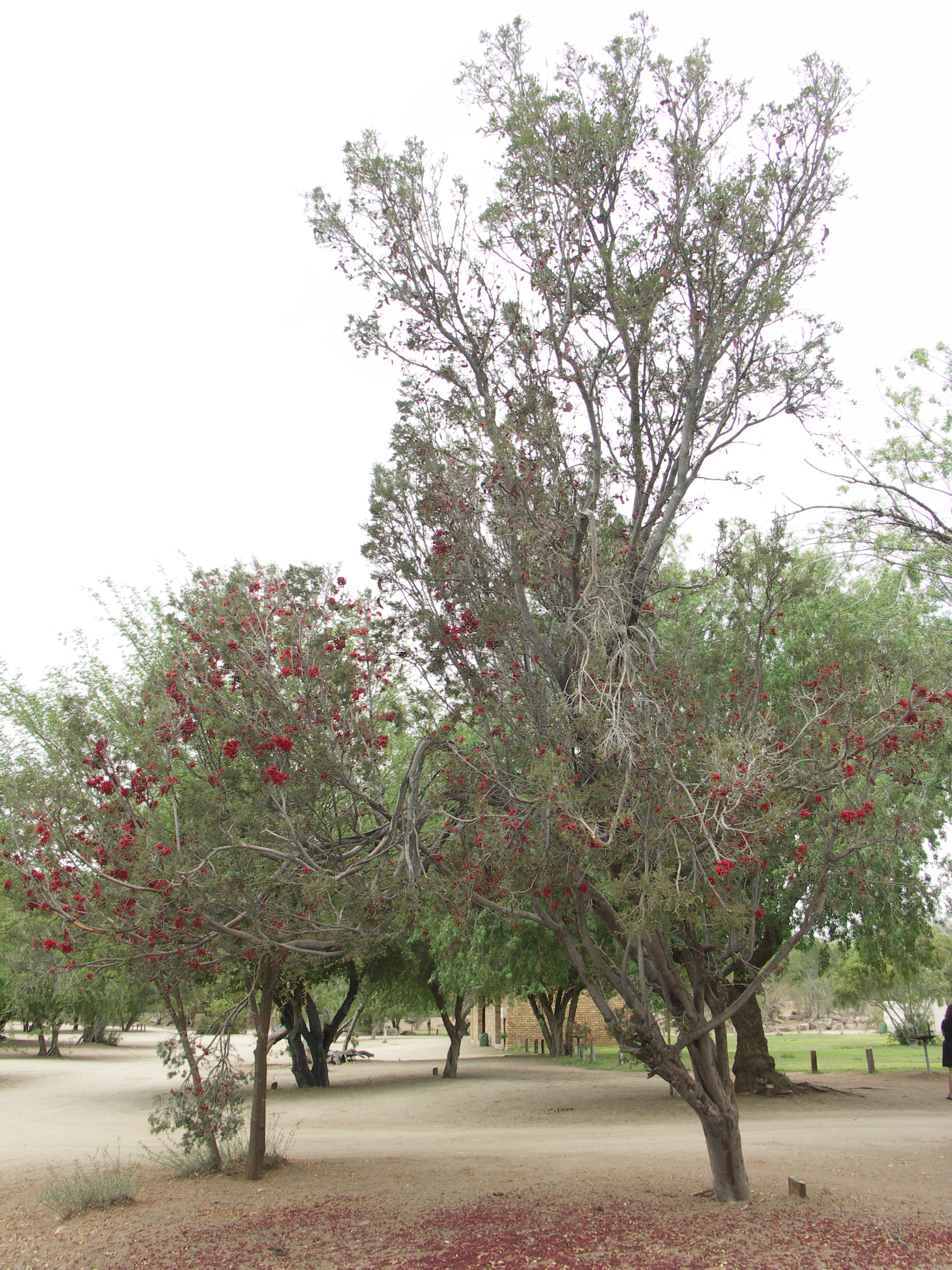
- Karoo boer-bean in flower

Conservation status
- Least Concern (IUCN 3.1)

Scientific classification
- Kingdom: Plantae
- Clade: Embryophytes
- Clade: Tracheophytes
- Clade: Spermatophytes
- Clade: Angiosperms
- Clade: Eudicots
- Clade: Rosids
- Order: Fabales
- Family: Fabaceae
- Genus: Schotia
- Species: S. afra

Binomial name
- Schotia afra Sond.

= Schotia afra =

Karoo boer-bean

Species of legume

Schotia afra is a flowering plant in the legume family, Fabaceae. It belongs to the subfamily Detarioideae. It occurs in Southern Africa. The genus was named for Richard van der Schot by Jacquin who was the director of the Imperial Gardens at Schönbrunn Palace, Vienna. Van der Schot was his head gardener.

== Description and ecology ==
The tree is small in stature (max. height 5 m), evergreen, with rigid branches and has a gnarled trunk. The flowers are numerous, bright red to pink in colour and are borne in small clusters during the months of February to March. They are distributed throughout the tree.

Flowers produce copious amounts of nectar which attract birds, especially the Lesser Double-collared Sunbird and Malachite Sunbird. The butterfly Dantalis breeds in the tree. Flowers are followed by attractive, large, lime green to pink seedpods which turn brown when ripe. The seed is dispersed through an explosive seedpod, which when dry, catapults the seeds great distances from the parent plant. Seeds are produced in May and June of each year. Under normal circumstances, the seeds would germinate in moist soil in late spring after the winter rains.

== Distribution ==
The tree occurs in South Africa along the banks of dry streams and small rivers in the Little Karoo, the drier areas of Eastern Cape and the southern part of Western Cape.

== Related species ==
- Schotia brachypetala
- Schotia capitata
- Schotia latifolia
