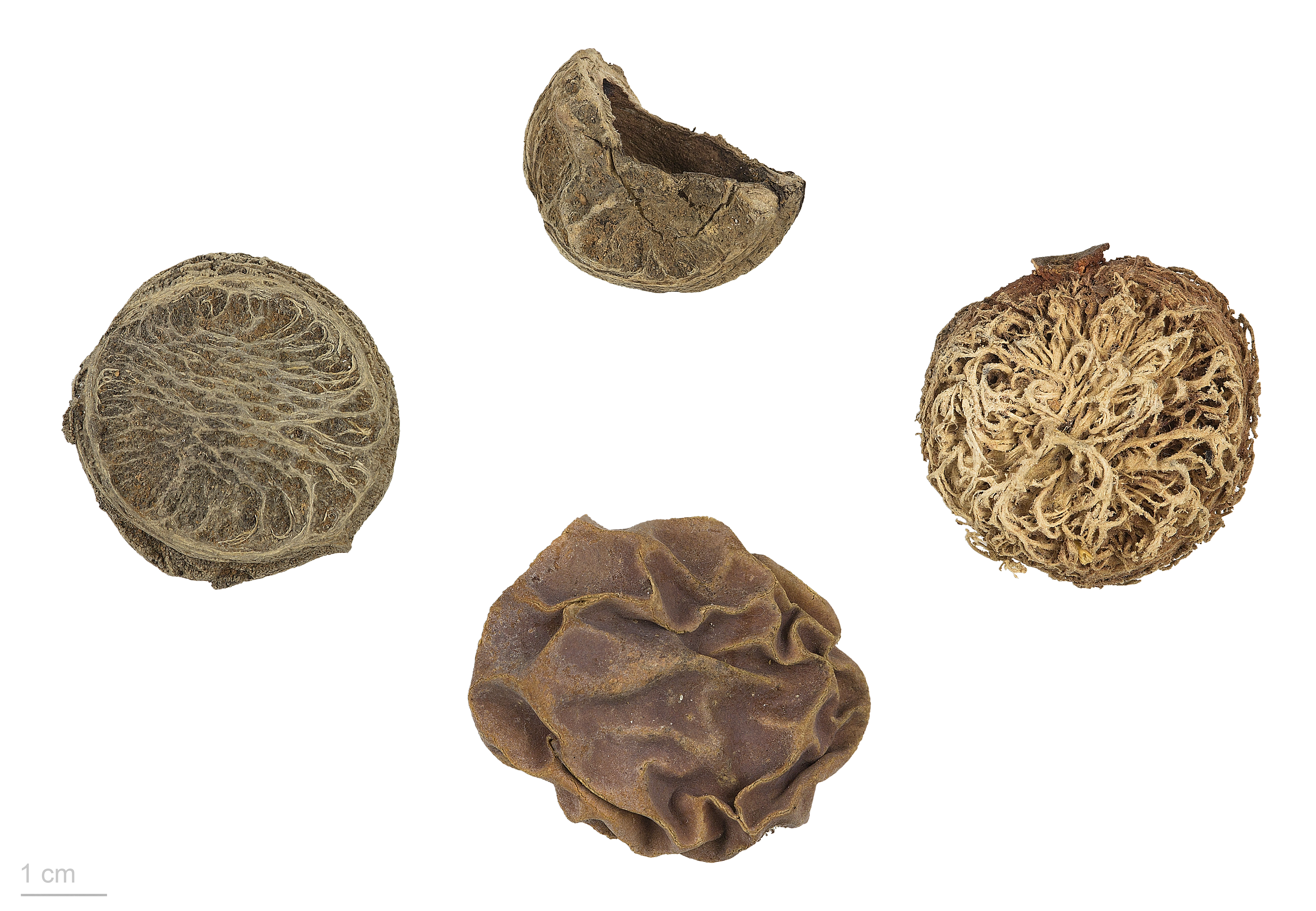
- Detarium senegalense - MHNT

Scientific classification
- Kingdom: Plantae
- Clade: Tracheophytes
- Clade: Angiosperms
- Clade: Eudicots
- Clade: Rosids
- Order: Fabales
- Family: Fabaceae
- Genus: Detarium
- Species: D. senegalense

Binomial name
- Detarium senegalense J.F.Gmel.

= Detarium senegalense =

Species of tree

Detarium senegalense is a leguminous tree in the subfamily Detarioideae. Unlike most members of the family, it produces globular fruits. Its common names include ditax, ditakh, detar, and tallow tree. The tree is of value for several reasons: the fruit is nutritious, is locally prominent in folk medicine, and is a source of quality timber. It could contribute to food security, sustainable land care, and rural development. As its Linnaean name indicates, it is native to Senegal and the surrounding countries of West Africa.

== Description ==
Detarium senegalese is a medium-sized tree that may grow up to 40 m tall. Like many trees in the Detarioideae, they have thick, irregularly placed branches. The trunks of mature trees typically range from 60–100 cm in diameter. The fruit is a globular, dark green drupe with fibrous pulp and a single seed. They are similar to the fruits of the tamarind, which belongs to Tamarindus, another genus in the subfamily Detarioideae. The sweet and sour flavour of the fruit is popular and the shelf life is good because of the hard shell and dry pulp. To establish the tree more widely as an agricultural line, some genetic work is required; for example some of the trees produce toxic fruits and there is currently no method of differentiating them from trees that grow desirable fruit.

== Location and growing conditions ==
Trees of the genus Detarium have not as yet been subjected to systematic culture or genetic improvement, and currently they remain confined to their countries of origin in West Africa. The fruits produced by the Detarium senegalense tree were described as “detar” in 1789, by De Jussieu in Senegal, Africa. Being discovered in Senegal, these trees still remain an important contributor to the country’s local food system and economy. Detarium senegalense trees are typically found growing in gallery forests, savannas, or along river banks.

Detarium senegalense trees are propagated by stones which are often distributed by animals who consume the fruits. Germination occurs 6–10 weeks after propagation, though the germination rate is typically low. Although tallow trees are leguminous, they do not fix significant amounts of nitrogen. The Detarium senegalense tree has two phases of fructification. Trees generally lose their leaves at the beginning of March and experience a renewal of leaves a few weeks later. After young leaves have developed, flowering occurs. As the fruits ripen, they develop a sweeter flavour and increased vitamin C content. Fruits reach full maturation from August–November depending on the climate of the region they are growing in. Trees are drought tolerant and have the ability to grow on infertile sites as they are relatively insensitive to soil, altitude, heat, and humidity. Their wood has good resistance to termites, pinhole borers, and marine bores; however, the wood is susceptible to Lyctus attack.

== Consumption and uses ==
Several parts of the Detarium senegalense tree are utilized for a variety of purposes, but mainly for folk medicine.

The bark of the tree is most widely used in preparations for: the expulsion of the placenta after birth and treatment of anaemia; wounds, skin problems, bronchitis, pneumonia, stomach ache and digestive disorders; tuberculosis; and cases of heavy blood loss.

Root decoctions are used to treat marasmus, debility, intestinal complaints, and convulsions. Leaf and shoot mixtures have been used in the treatment of dysentery, conjunctivitis, arthritis, fractures, and boils.

Seeds have been applied to control blood-glucose levels in diabetic individuals, for the treatment of mosquito bites and as an antidote against arrow poison and snake bite.

Nutritionally, “ofo” flour made from the seeds is often used as a soup thickener. The pulp of the fruit is eaten directly, but also is made into sherbets, juices, marmalades, or dried like dates. The timber from the trees is referred to as “African mahogany” and is characterized by its dark reddish-brown shade. Though the wood is heavy, it is easy to work with and resists moisture, weathering, and pests such as termites and borers. It is valued for the construction of houses, fences, and boats, but also as firewood as it burns easily and cleanly. Detarium senegalense trees are frequently employed in reforestation programs in areas of degraded land as they grow well even on poor soils.

Though there is little information on the nutrient composition of the Detarium senegalense fruit, it appears to be nourishing. Per 100 g, sweet detar fruit contains 116 kcal energy, 1.9 g protein, 0.4 g fat, 29.6 g carbohydrates, 2.3 g fibre, 27 mg calcium, 48 mg phosphate, 0.14 mg thiamin and 0.05 mg riboflavin, 2.8 mg iron, 0.6 mg niacin, and, most notably, about 1200 mg vitamin C. In comparison to recommended daily vitamin and mineral requirements for an adult (in Canada), the fresh fruit contains moderate amounts of thiamin and iron, an exceptional amount of vitamin C, and lesser quantities of the other vitamins and minerals. The fruit seeds yield about 12% protein, and are rich in essential amino acids lysine and tryptophan. The “ofo” flour made from the seeds accordingly is very nutritious. Leaves from the trees have demonstrated antiviral activity against a number of human and animal viruses and the bark has shown antibacterial activity against many pathogenic bacteria, justifying the medicinal properties of the plant.

== Practical information ==
Fruits such as sweet detar can contribute to successful interventions to improve local livelihoods as they are rich in nutrients, require minimal preparation, and have flavours that appeal to many tastes. Storing sweet detar at temperatures around 4 degrees Celsius will preserve its quality by limiting the loss of vitamin C. As the fruit goes bad, the coating will change to a brown-yellow colour. A sieve is useful for separating debris and the seed from the pulp of the fruit and a mortar and pestle work well for pureeing the pulp. Though some Detarium senegalense trees produce toxic fruits, these are often identifiable by the presence of fruits remaining under the trees. If left behind, the trees are likely toxic as animals are normally very quick to take the fruits. Propagation time can be decreased by grafting. For the Detarium senegalense tree, the apical graft is the most effective when employed at the end of the dry season. It is also important to work toward increasing the local dependency and appreciation of wild fruits when creating interventions as there are some traditional negative stigmas and beliefs concerning the consumption of wild fruits. Conflicts around ownership may arise if trees remain undomesticated. A potential solution is the adoption of salvation forestry, where local people produce local products in a manner that guarantees them a share in the yields.
