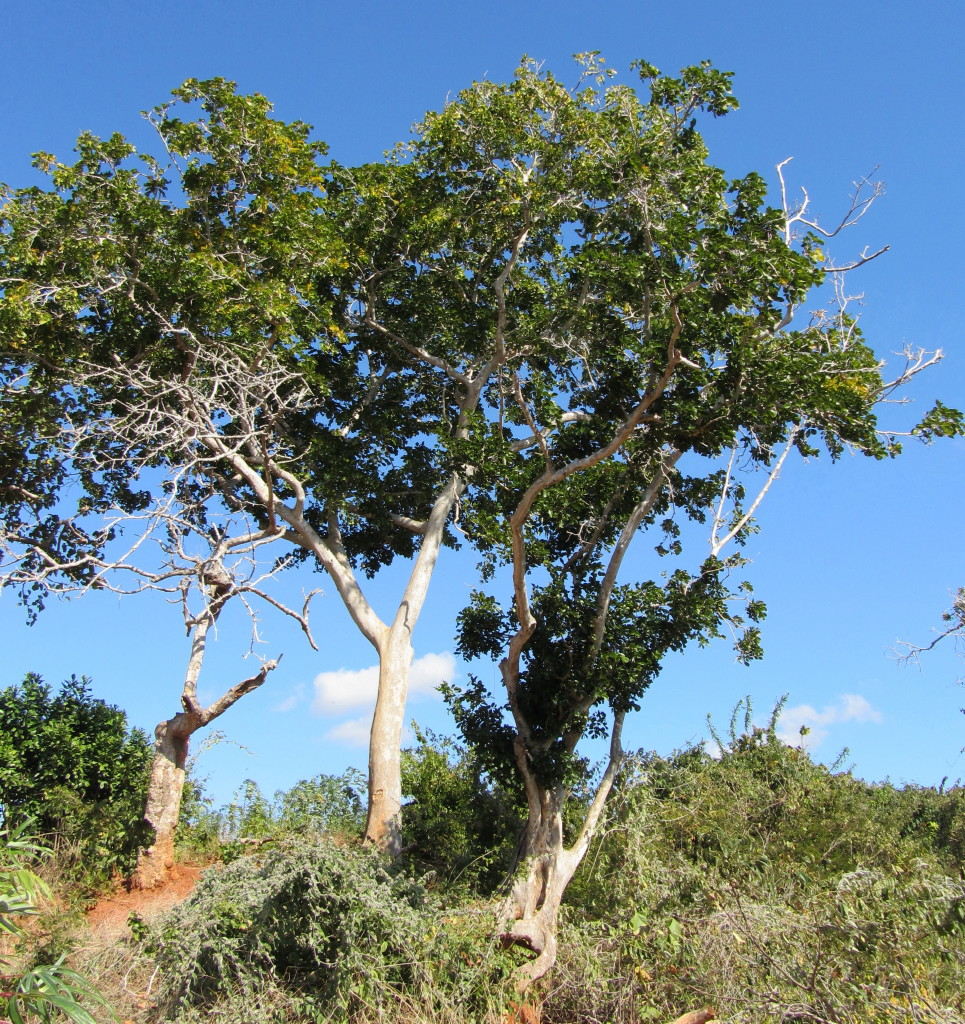

Conservation status
- Vulnerable (IUCN 3.1)

Scientific classification
- Kingdom: Plantae
- Clade: Tracheophytes
- Clade: Angiosperms
- Clade: Eudicots
- Clade: Rosids
- Order: Fabales
- Family: Fabaceae
- Subfamily: Detarioideae
- Tribe: Amherstieae
- Genus: Micklethwaitia; G.P.Lewis & Schrire (2004)
- Species: M. carvalhoi

Binomial name
- Micklethwaitia carvalhoi (Harms) G.P.Lewis & Schrire (2004)

Synonyms
- Brenaniodendron carvalhoi (Harms) J.Léonard (1999); Cynometra carvalhoi Harms (1899)

= Micklethwaitia =

Genus of legumes

Micklethwaitia is a monotypic genus of legume in the family Fabaceae. Its only species, Micklethwaitia carvalhoi, is endemic to Mozambique. It is closely related to Annea, Gabonius, and Scorodophloeus.

== Description ==
Micklethwaitia carvalhoi is a small tree, 6–10 metres (20–33 ft) tall.

== Distribution and habitat ==
Micklethwaitia carvalhoi is endemic to northern Mozambique, occurring in coastal dry forests in the Cabo Delgado and Nampula provinces. Although coastal, it prefers clay-rich soils, as opposed to sandy soils.

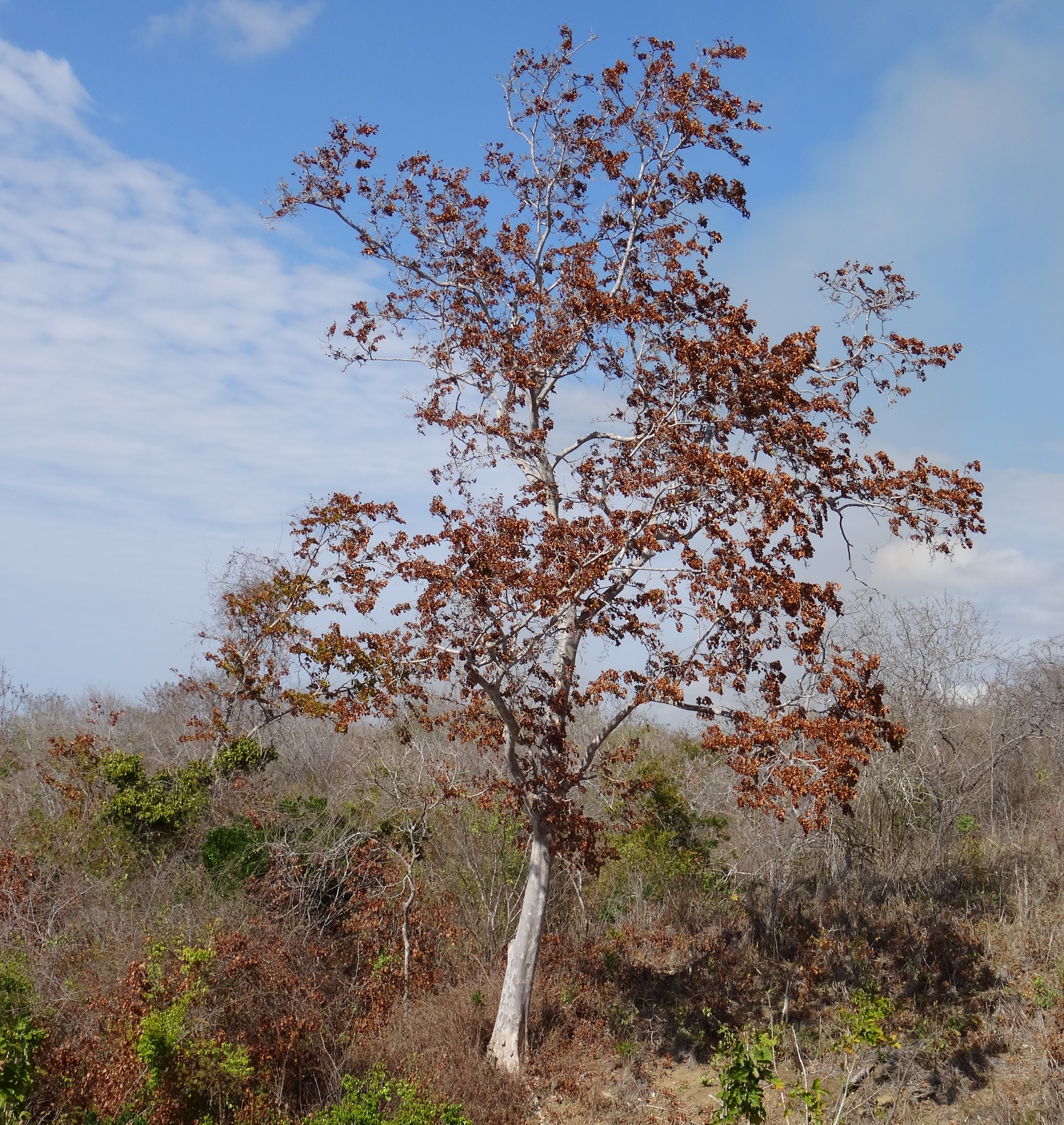

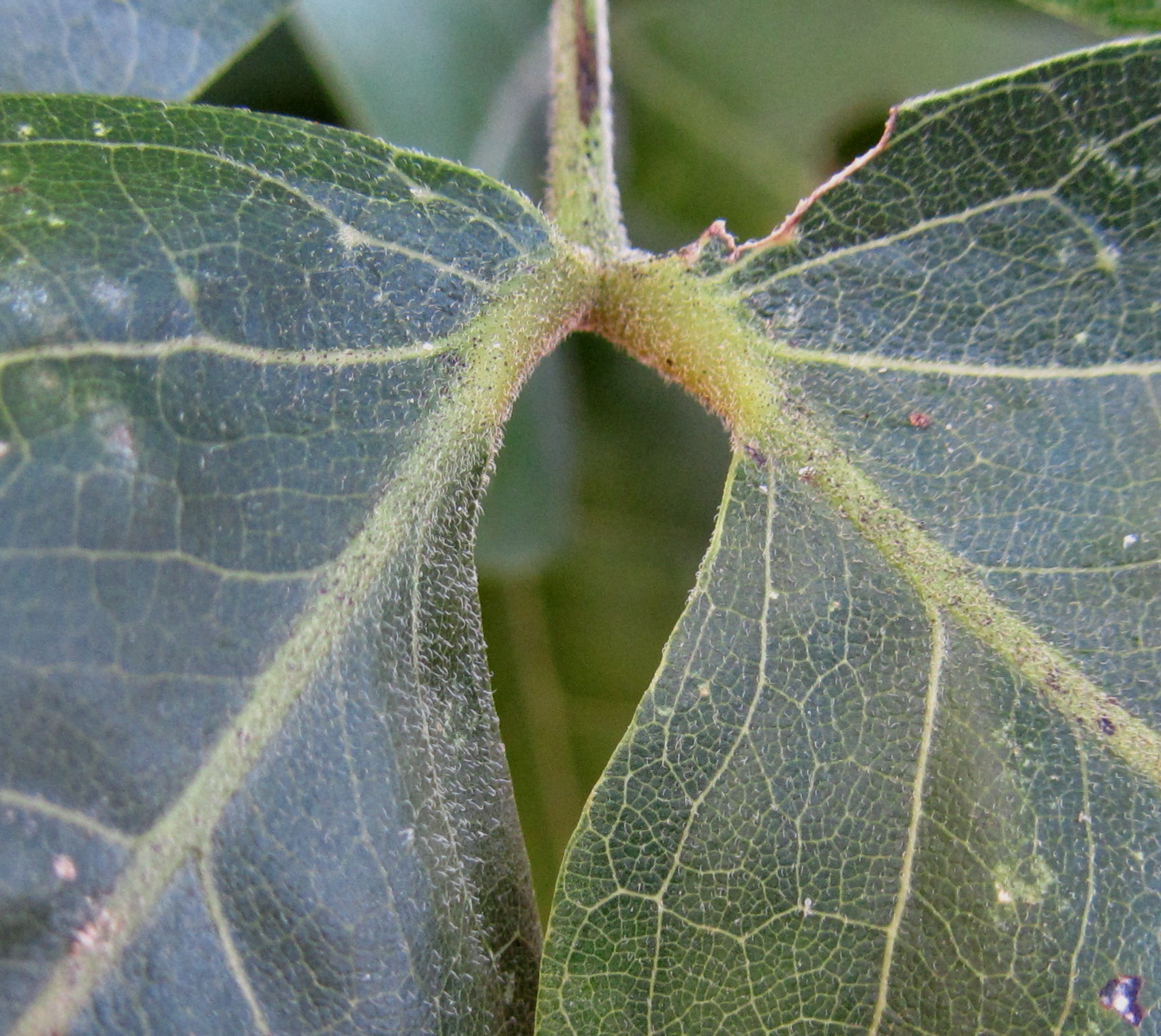

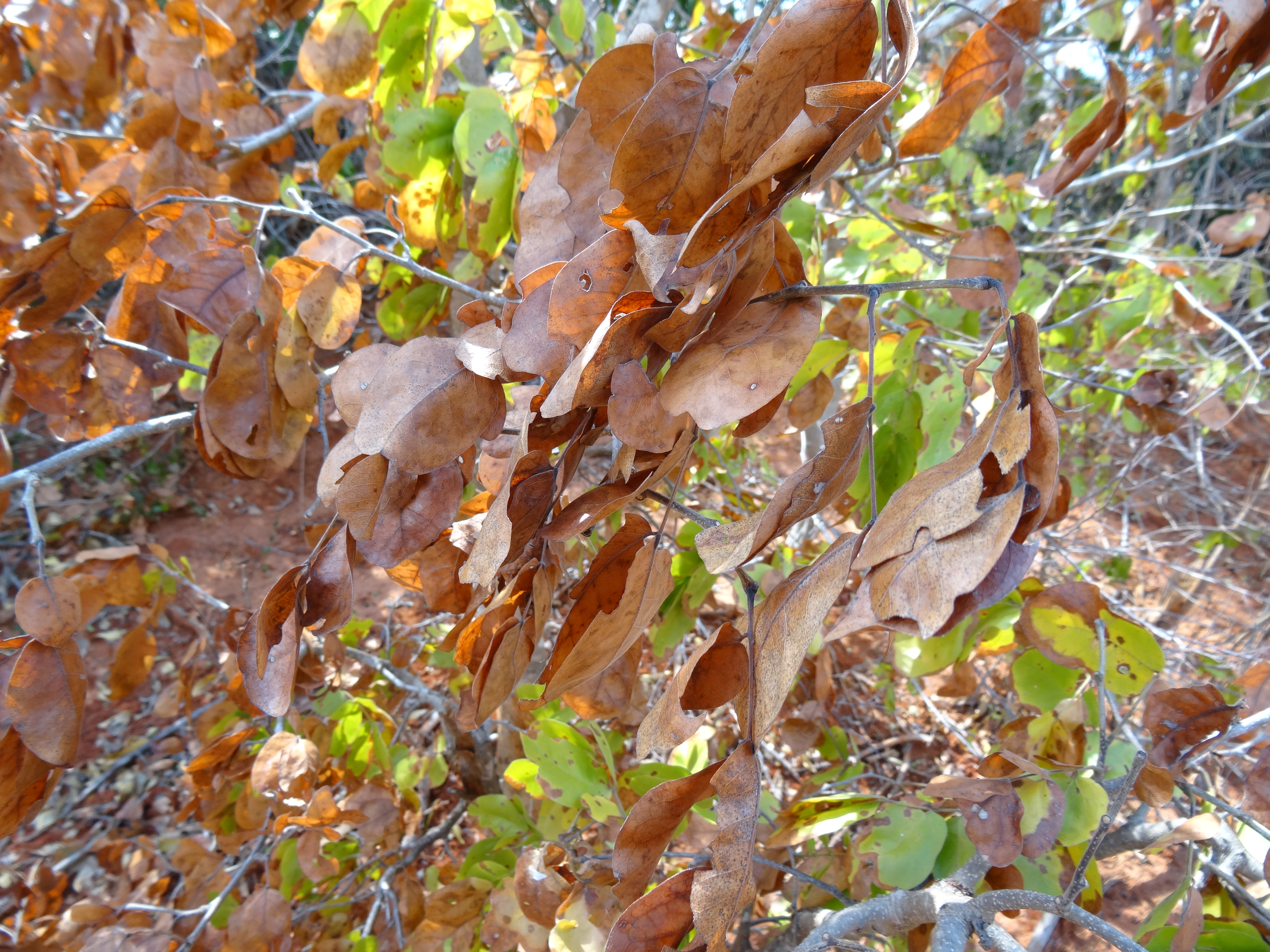

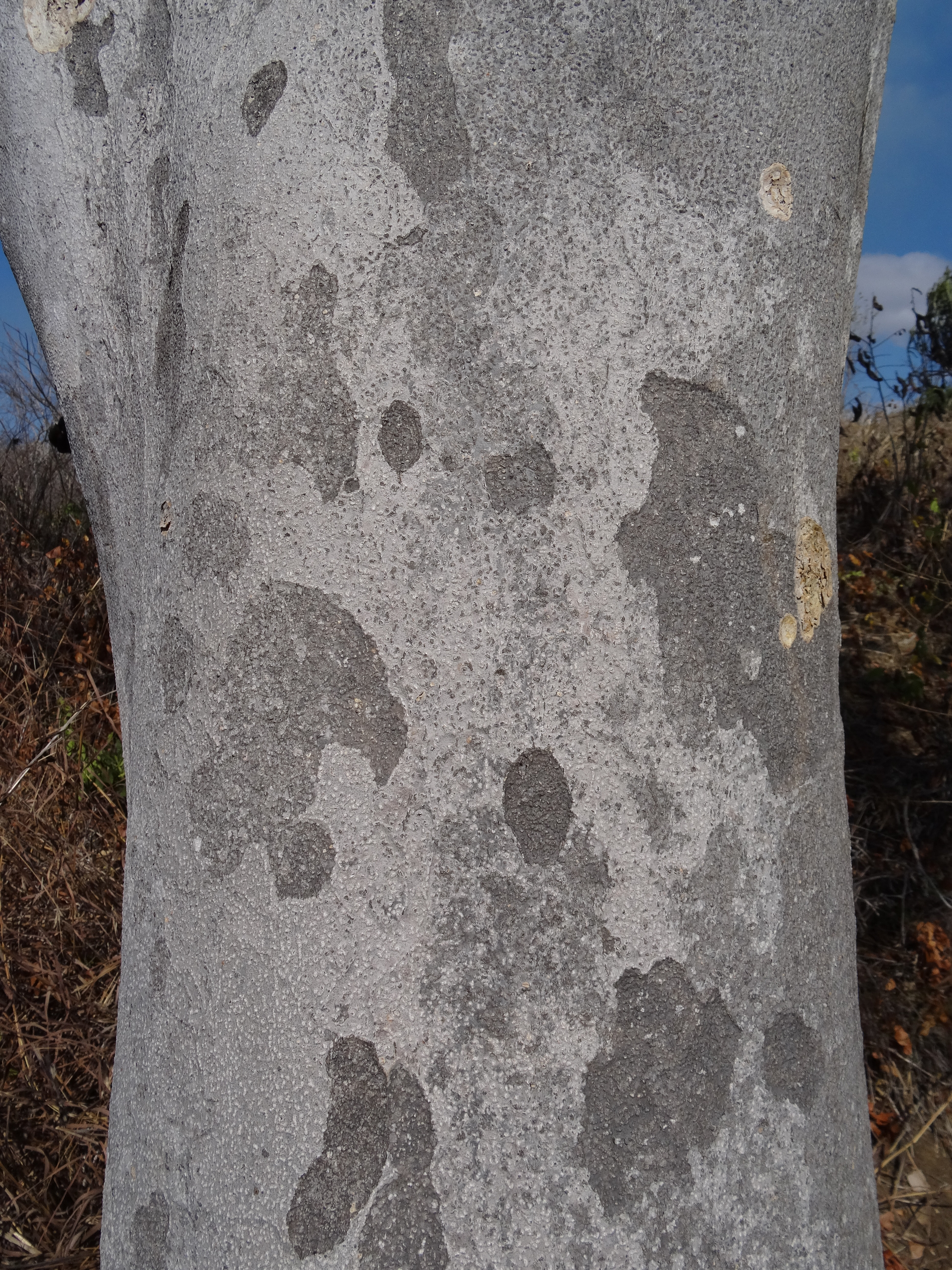

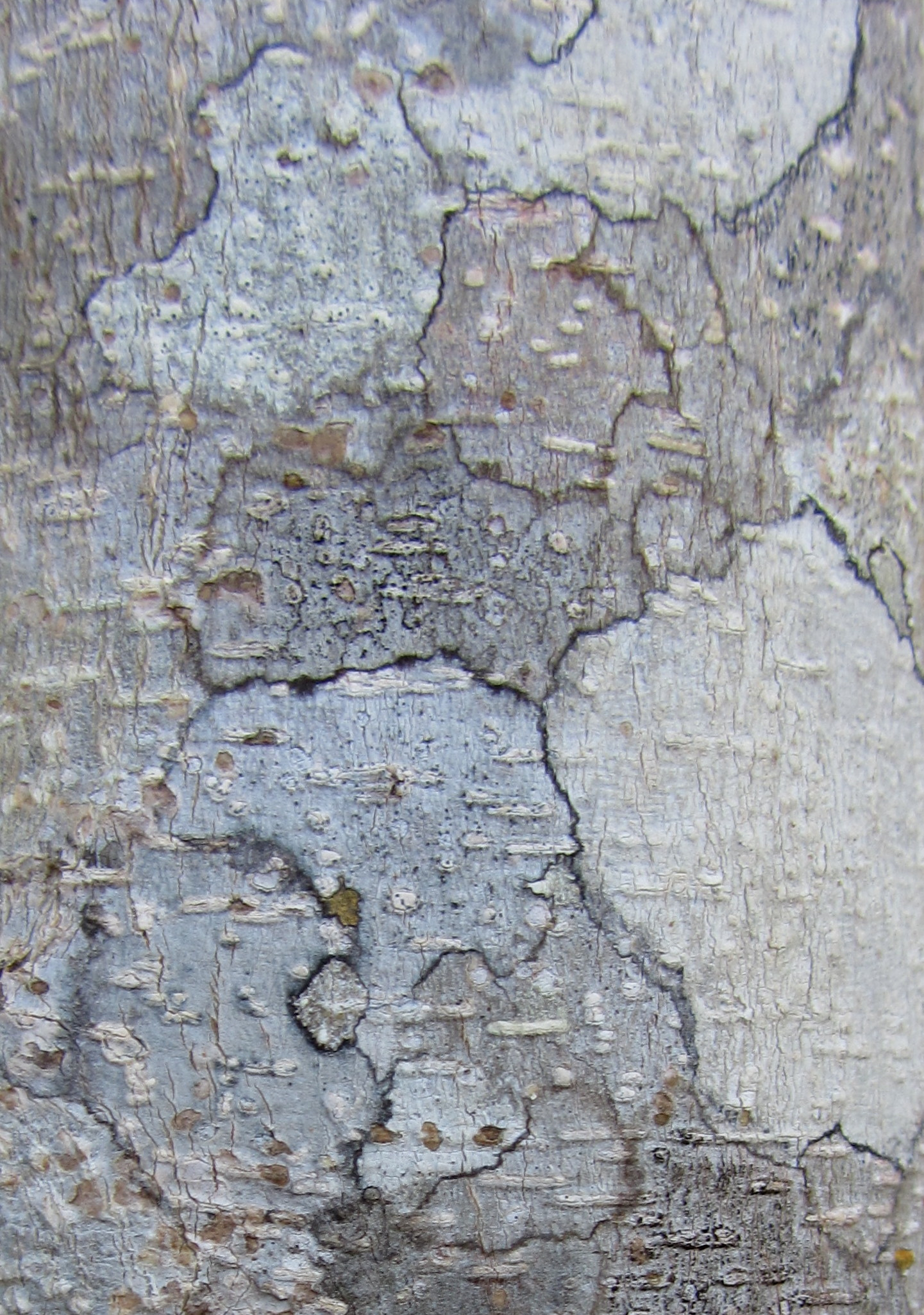
