= Goniorrhachis =

Scientific classification
- Kingdom: Plantae
- Clade: Tracheophytes
- Clade: Angiosperms
- Clade: Eudicots
- Clade: Rosids
- Order: Fabales
- Family: Fabaceae
- Subfamily: Detarioideae
- Tribe: Barnebydendreae
- Genus: Goniorrhachis; Taub.
- Species: G. marginata

Binomial name
- Goniorrhachis marginata Taub.

Genus of legumes

Goniorrhachis is a genus of flowering plants in the legume family, Fabaceae. It belongs to the subfamily Detarioideae. It contains a single species, Goniorrhachis marginata, native to eastern Brazil.
