= Stemonocoleus =

Scientific classification
- Kingdom: Plantae
- Clade: Tracheophytes
- Clade: Angiosperms
- Clade: Eudicots
- Clade: Rosids
- Order: Fabales
- Family: Fabaceae
- Subfamily: Detarioideae
- Tribe: Detarieae
- Genus: Stemonocoleus; Harms 1905)
- Species: S. micranthus

Binomial name
- Stemonocoleus micranthus Harms (1905)

Genus of legumes

Stemonocoleus micranthus is a species of flowering plant in the legume family, Fabaceae. It is a tree native to western and west-central tropical Africa, ranging from Côte d'Ivoire to the Central African Republic and Republic of the Congo. It is a tree of the Guineo-Congolian forest, growing to 150 feet (46 m) high, with straight bole and buttresses. It is the sole species in genus Stemonocoleus. It belongs to subfamily Detarioideae.
