= Tessmannia =

Scientific classification
- Kingdom: Plantae
- Clade: Embryophytes
- Clade: Tracheophytes
- Clade: Spermatophytes
- Clade: Angiosperms
- Clade: Eudicots
- Clade: Rosids
- Order: Fabales
- Family: Fabaceae
- Subfamily: Detarioideae
- Tribe: Detarieae
- Genus: Tessmannia; Harms

Genus of legumes

Tessmannia is a genus of flowering plants in the family Fabaceae. Most species are native to Tropical Africa, and are found in the countries of Angola, Cameroon, the Central African Republic, Congo, Gabon, Ivory Coast, Liberia, Sierra Leone, Tanzania, Zambia, Zaïre and Zimbabwe. Tessmannia princeps is native to Tanzania.

The genus name of Tessmannia is in honour of Günther Tessmann (1884–1969), a German-Brazilian ethnologist and botanist. He was also an African explorer and plant collector, who later settled in Brazil. It was first described and published in Bot. Jahrb. Syst. Vol.45 on page 295 in 1910.

== Known species ==
As accepted by the Plants of the World Online as of February 2021:

- Tessmannia africana Harms
- Tessmannia anomala (Micheli) Harms
- Tessmannia baikieaoides Hutch. & Dalziel
- Tessmannia burttii Harms
- Tessmannia camoneana Torre
- Tessmannia copallifera J.Léonard
- Tessmannia dawei J.Léonard
- Tessmannia densiflora Harms
- Tessmannia dewildemaniana Harms
- Tessmannia korupensis Burgt
- Tessmannia lescrauwaetii (De Wild.) Harms
- Tessmannia martiniana Harms
- Tessmannia princeps A.Bianchi, Tomasi, Mwakisoma, Barbieri & Q.Luke
- Tessmannia yangambiensis Louis ex J.Léonard
