= Gabonius =

Scientific classification
- Kingdom: Plantae
- Clade: Tracheophytes
- Clade: Angiosperms
- Clade: Eudicots
- Clade: Rosids
- Order: Fabales
- Family: Fabaceae
- Subfamily: Detarioideae
- Tribe: Amherstieae
- Genus: Gabonius; Mackinder & Wieringa
- Species: G. ngouniensi

Binomial name
- Gabonius ngouniensi (Pellegr.) Mackinder & Wieringa

Genus of flowering plants

Gabonius is a genus of flowering plants belonging to the family Fabaceae. The only species is Gabonius ngouniensis.

Its native range is Western Central Tropical Africa.
