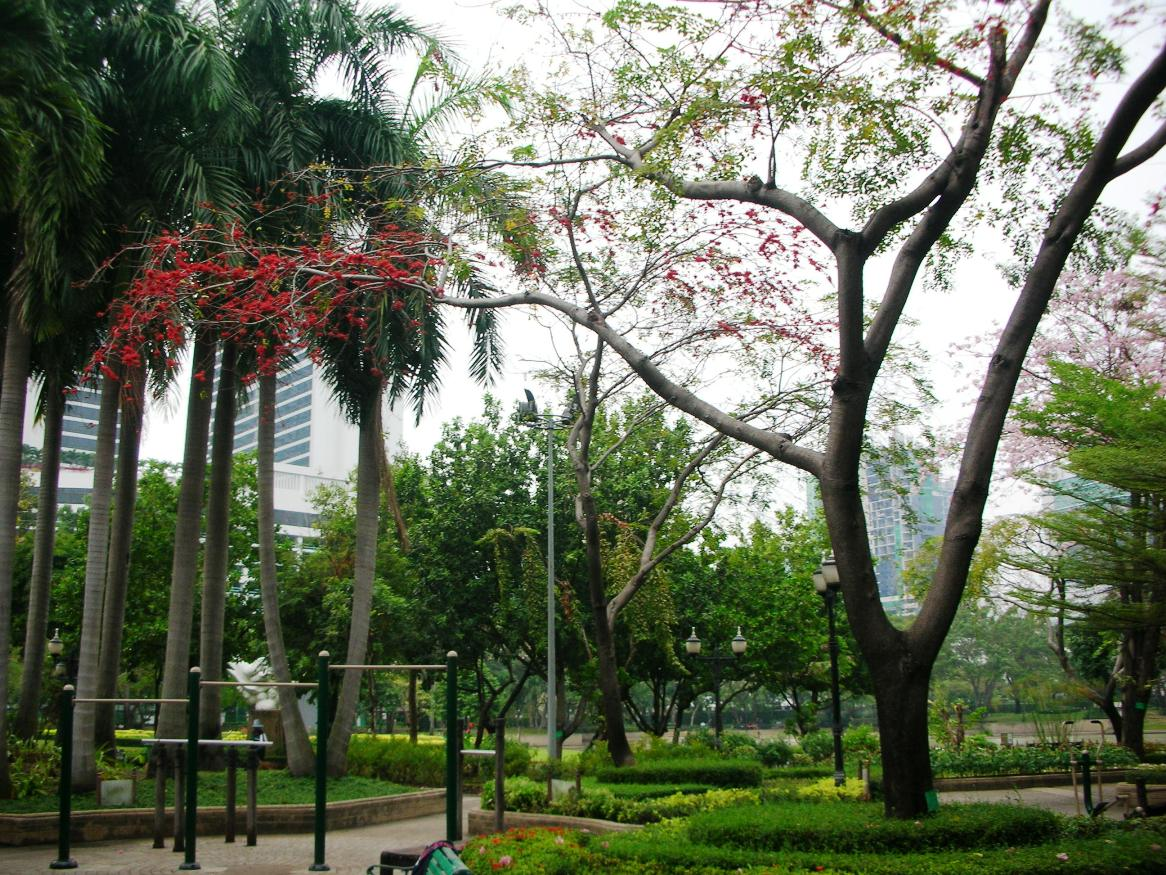
- Barnebydendron septentrionalis in bloom

Scientific classification
- Kingdom: Plantae
- Clade: Tracheophytes
- Clade: Angiosperms
- Clade: Eudicots
- Clade: Rosids
- Order: Fabales
- Family: Fabaceae
- Subfamily: Detarioideae
- Tribe: Barnebydendreae
- Genus: Barnebydendron; J.H.Kirkbr. 1999
- Species: B. riedelii

Binomial name
- Barnebydendron riedelii (Tul.) J.H.Kirkbr. 1999

Synonyms
- Phyllocarpus Riedel ex Tul. 1843; Phyllocarpus riedelii Tul. 1843; Phyllocarpus septentrionalis Donn. Sm. 1913

= Barnebydendron =

Genus of legumes

Barnebydendron riedelii, also known as monkey-flower tree (Thai: ประดู่แดง), is a species of flowering plants in the legume family, Fabaceae. It belongs to the subfamily Detarioideae. It is the only member of the genus Barnebydendron. It is a tree reaching 10–12 m in height with scarlet red flowers. Originally it came from tropical dry forests of Central America and tropical South America but it has been extensively grown in tropical areas worldwide as a garden tree.
