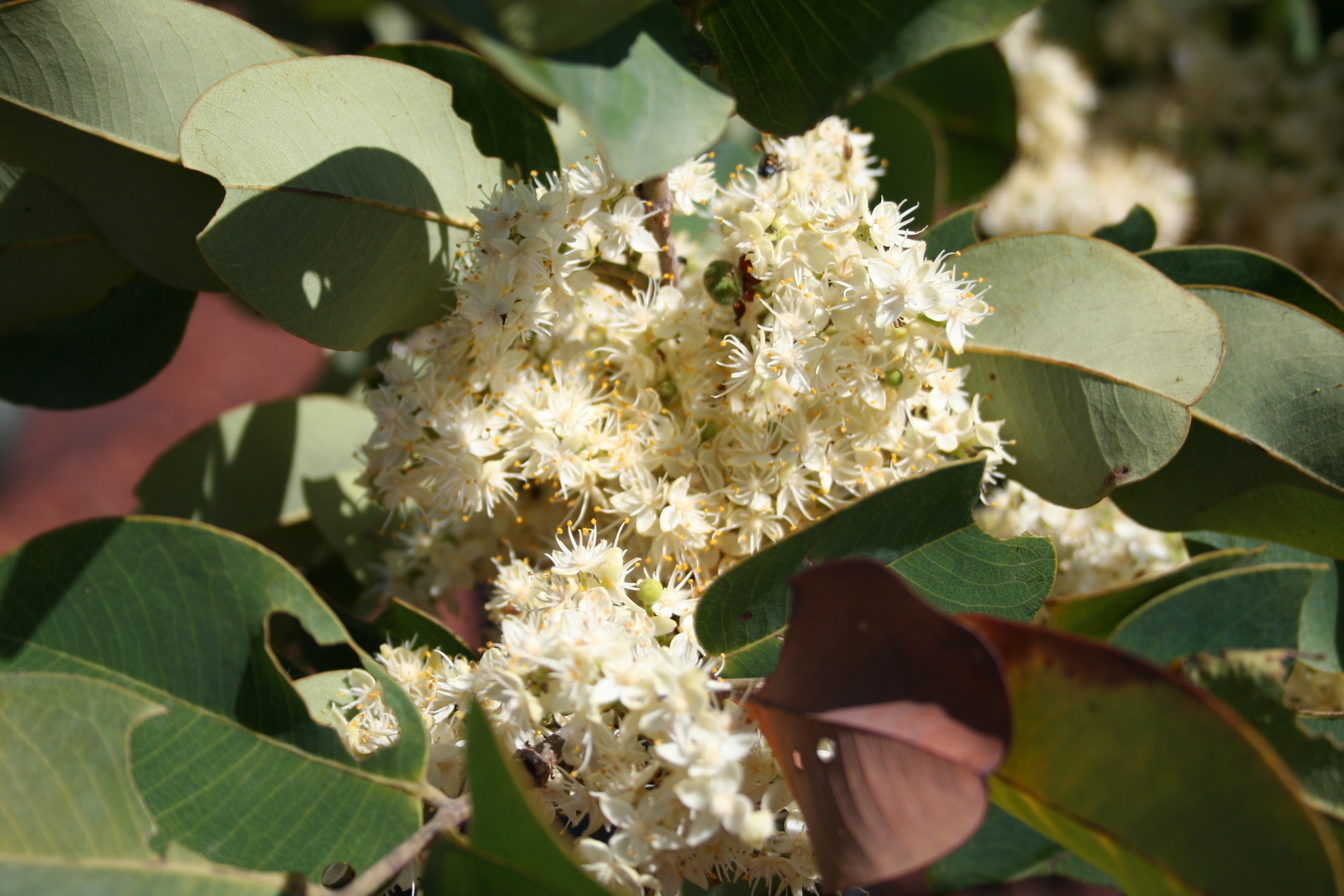

Scientific classification
- Kingdom: Plantae
- Clade: Tracheophytes
- Clade: Angiosperms
- Clade: Eudicots
- Clade: Rosids
- Order: Fabales
- Family: Fabaceae
- Genus: Detarium
- Species: D. microcarpum

Binomial name
- Detarium microcarpum Guill. & Perr.

= Detarium microcarpum =

Species of flowering plant

Detarium microcarpum (Bambara: Ntamajalan), commonly known as sweet detar, sweet dattock or tallow tree, is an underutilized species of tree legume that grows naturally in the drier regions of West and Central Africa. It has a wide range of uses due to its medicinal properties, edible fruit (eaten raw, cooked, or made into flour with many uses of its own) and hardwood, which is used as fuel. This makes it valuable and appreciated by local communities, but further research and effort are needed for its domestication.

== Description ==
Detarium microcarpum is an African tree belonging to the family Fabaceae (legumes). It is a small tree or shrub growing up to 15 m tall but can reach 25 m in moist areas. In terms of growth rate, the shoots of the trunk can reach a height of 1.5 m – 2 m in 1 to 2 years and are much more vigorous than seedlings which on average grow to 0.6 m after 3 years and may reach 1.5 m in 4 years. It flowers during the rainy season (July to September/November), but the main flowering period only lasts up to 8 days. It bears fruit from September – January/May and in November; the tree sheds its leaves and produces new leaves in March.

== Location and growing conditions ==
Detarium microcarpum occurs naturally in the drier regions of West and Central Africa (Benin, Cameroon, Central African Republic, Chad, Gambia, Ghana, Guinea, Guinea Bissau, Côte d'Ivoire, Mali, Niger, Nigeria, Senegal, Sudan and Togo). Unlike the other species of its family, D. microcarpum grows in dry savanna, while Detarium senegalense grows in the dry forest, and Detarium macrocarpum grows in humid forest. Many different vernacular names exist for this species, including the English, sweet dattock or tallow tree, and the French, dankh or petit détar, as well as Abu-laili (in Sudan) or Tamba Dala (in Mali).

Propagation of this species may be vegetative or from seed. It is capable of vegetative propagation by coppice regeneration and suckering from stumps or roots, as well as propagation by rooted cuttings and grafting using scions from mature trees. This species is mainly found on shallow, stony and lateritic soils, often on hills, as well as in regions with an annual rainfall of 600–1000 mm. It is most common in wooded savannahs or savannahs, semi-cleared dry forest areas and fallows, growing in sandy or hard soils with high iron content.

== Other farming issues ==
The seeds of D. microcarpum can be stored at ambient temperature (26 °C) for 5 years. The seed must be scarified to break dormancy before being planted –scarification through immersion in boiling water or sulphuric acid, and next soaking them in tepid water for 24 hours, or by removing the seed coat with a sharp object. The plant parts are harvested according to need and availability. Fruits are harvested from March to May and can be kept for 1–3 years in jute bags. Leaves are harvested from April to November and roots and bark are harvested year round, all of which are used fresh or dried for future use. Natural germination is hampered by bush fires and dry spells posing a threat to poor farmers. Extensive fruit collection, uncontrolled tree cutting, overgrazing and bushfires pose a threat to the species.

== Stress tolerance ==
Detarium microcarpum is heat and drought tolerant and capable of thriving on infertile sites. The species is often found in relatively poor soils; farmers can distinguish if land is unproductive if the tree is abundant in that area. The tree bark's colour may also indicate the fertility of the land, with red indicating fertile soil and black indicating poor soil fertility. This tree shows some pest resistant properties. A methanol extract of the leaves exhibited strong deterrent activity against termites, specifically Reticulitermes speratus.

== Genetic stocks ==
Germplasm collections for D. microcarpum are held at the Institut d'Economie Rurale (IER) in Mali and at the Centre National des Semences Forestieres (CNSF) in Burkina Faso. Trees differ biochemically, in fruit length and width, protein content, with higher dry-matter per unit volume and sugar content in larger fruits than in smaller ones. Differences between tree populations are expressed morphologically based on fruit characteristics (endocarp shape, seed shape, pulp thickness) and on leaf characteristics of the seedlings grown from these fruits (number of leaves, and leaf length, width and area). The number of leaves at the seedling stage has been observed to be inversely proportional to pulp thickness of the pulp of the fruit the seedling is grown from.

== Consumption and uses ==
This species is highly appreciated by local peoples due to its variety of uses; it is said to be one of the most appreciated in the environments where it occurs naturally. The fruit can be eaten raw or cooked, but for the most part, its pulp is transformed into flour. The seed flour is a traditional emulsifying, flavouring and thickening agent used to prepare cakes, bread, couscous, baby food and local beer. Its seed kernels are added to egusi soup, or are cooked and eaten as vegetables. The leaves are used as a condiment or vegetables, as are its flowers.

Medicinal properties are in the roots, stems, bark, leaves and fruits to treat ailments including tuberculosis, meningitis and diarrhea. The species showed strong inhibitory effects on HIV-1 or HIV-2 infection in methanol extracts. Leaves and roots are also used to treat farm animals.

Detarium microcarpum has several other uses for rural communities, leaves being used to thatch roofs, seeds dried and made into necklaces or are ground and used as a fragrance (considered to have an aphrodisiac effect) and mosquito repellent prepared from the roots. Leaves and roots are also used to treat farm animals. Hardness, as well as its moisture, weathering and pest resistance makes it useful for construction and carpentry. It lights quickly making it high-quality fuel wood and charcoal.

The fruit is rich in vitamin C (3.2 mg), with 4.8 g protein and 64.5 g of sugar per 100 g. It was found to have the highest total phenolic, flavonoid and antioxidant values among fourteen wild edible fruits from Burkina Faso. The fruit pulp has been found to have high proportions of carbohydrate (40-42.0%) and protein (29.1-30.9%). The seeds yield 7.5% oil with the predominant fatty acid being linoleic acid. The hulled seed flour contains per 100 g: 3.5–6.5 g water, 3 g crude fibre, 13–15 g crude fat, 13.5–27 g crude protein, 39 g carbohydrate, Ca 500 mg, Mg 500 mg, Fe 100 mg.

== Economics ==
Statistics on its production and trade are scarce, despite the fact that it is sold in markets across West Africa; in 2005 in Mali, 1 kg of fruits sold for US$0.04 during harvest time and for US$0.70 at the market in Dakar, Senegal; seeds were sold in 2004 in francophone West Africa for US$11.03/kg. Different strategies could be adopted by poor farmers to add value to the fruit in the market. The fruit pulp is suitable for concentrated juice and jam processing adding more value than the fruit alone. Roasting or soaking seeds has nutritional benefits as it increases the content and properties of certain nutrients.

== Conclusion ==
Due to its many uses, D. microcarpum has great potential for poverty or hunger stricken areas where growing conditions are poor especially. Efforts must be put forth to encourage its use and domestication. Research in the following areas could aid in furthering its benefits: genetic variation associated with drought tolerance; causes underlying variation in tree growth and fruit production; more information on its medicinal, nutritional and wood-energy properties; effective population sizes in semi-natural farmland populations and minimum viable populations for conservation and long-term sustainable use. Additionally, regulation is needed for exploitation of wood, controlling fires, reducing fuel-wood demand and encouraging re-forestation. Rural communities require aid to develop sustainable use and conservation practices for the species; this must be done using local knowledge.

== Bibliography ==
- Abdalbasit, Adam Mariod, Mohamed Elwathig S. Mirghani, Ahmad Bustamam Abdul and Siddig Ibrahim Abdelwahab. "Detarium microcarpum Guill and Perr fruit proximate chemical analysis and sensory characteristics of concentrated juice and jam," African Journal of Biotechnology 8 no.17 (2009): 4217-4221, accessed November 25, 2012, http://www.ajol.info/index.php/ajb/article/viewFile/62360/50337
- Kido, Kim. "Sweet detar: Food, Fragrance, Fodder, and More," Nourishing the Planet, accessed November 22, 2012, http://blogs.worldwatch.org/nourishingtheplanet/tag/detarium-senegalense/ Archived 2016-03-04 at the Wayback Machine
- Kouyaté, A.M. "Enquête ethnobotanique sur Detarium microcarpum Guill. et Perr. au sud du Mali," in: Domestication des espèces agroforestières au Sahel: Situation actuelle et perspectives, edited by Kalinganire, A., Niang, A. and Kone, B. (eds) ICRAF Working Paper No. 5. World Agroforestry Centre, Nairobi, Kenya, 2005. Quoted in Kalinganire, A., J.C. Weber, A. Uwamariya, B. Kone. "Improving Rural Livelihoods through Domestication of Indigenous Fruit Trees in the Parklands of the Sagel," in Indigenous Fruit Trees in the Tropics: Domestication, Utilization and Commercialization edited by F. K. Akinnifesi, R. R. B. Leakey, O. C. Ajaui, G. Sileshi, Z. Tchoundjeu, P. Matakala. F. R. Kwesiga, 183-203, (2007). Accessed November 26, 2012. http://www.worldagroforestrycentre.org/downloads/publications/PDFs/BC07271.PDF
- Kouyaté A.M. and N. Lamien. "Detarium microcarpum, sweet detar." Conservation and Sustainable Use of Genetic Resources of Priority Food Tree Species in sub-Saharan Africa. Bioversity International 4 (2011): 1-8 Accessed November 24, 2012. http://www.bioversityinternational.org/fileadmin/bioversityDocs/About_Us/Hosted_Services/SAFORGEN_leaflets/Detarium_EN.pdf%5B%5D
- Kouyaté, A.M. and P. van Damme "Medicinal plants/Plantes médicinales: Detarium microcarpum Guill. & Perr." Prota 11, no. 1 (2006). Accessed November 24, 2012. http://database.prota.org/PROTAhtml/Detarium%20microcarpum_En.htm Archived 2012-03-09 at the Wayback Machine
- Taita, Paulette, "Use of woody plants by locals in Mare aux Hippopotames Biosphere Reserve in western Burkina Faso," Biodiversity and Conservation 12 (2003): 1205-121. Accessed November 24, 2012. http://download.springer.com/static/pdf/914/art%253A10.1023%252FA%253A1023045316329.pdf?auth66=1353997997_8bf2675ae204539ac45ddcd043780af4&ext=.pdf%5B%5D
