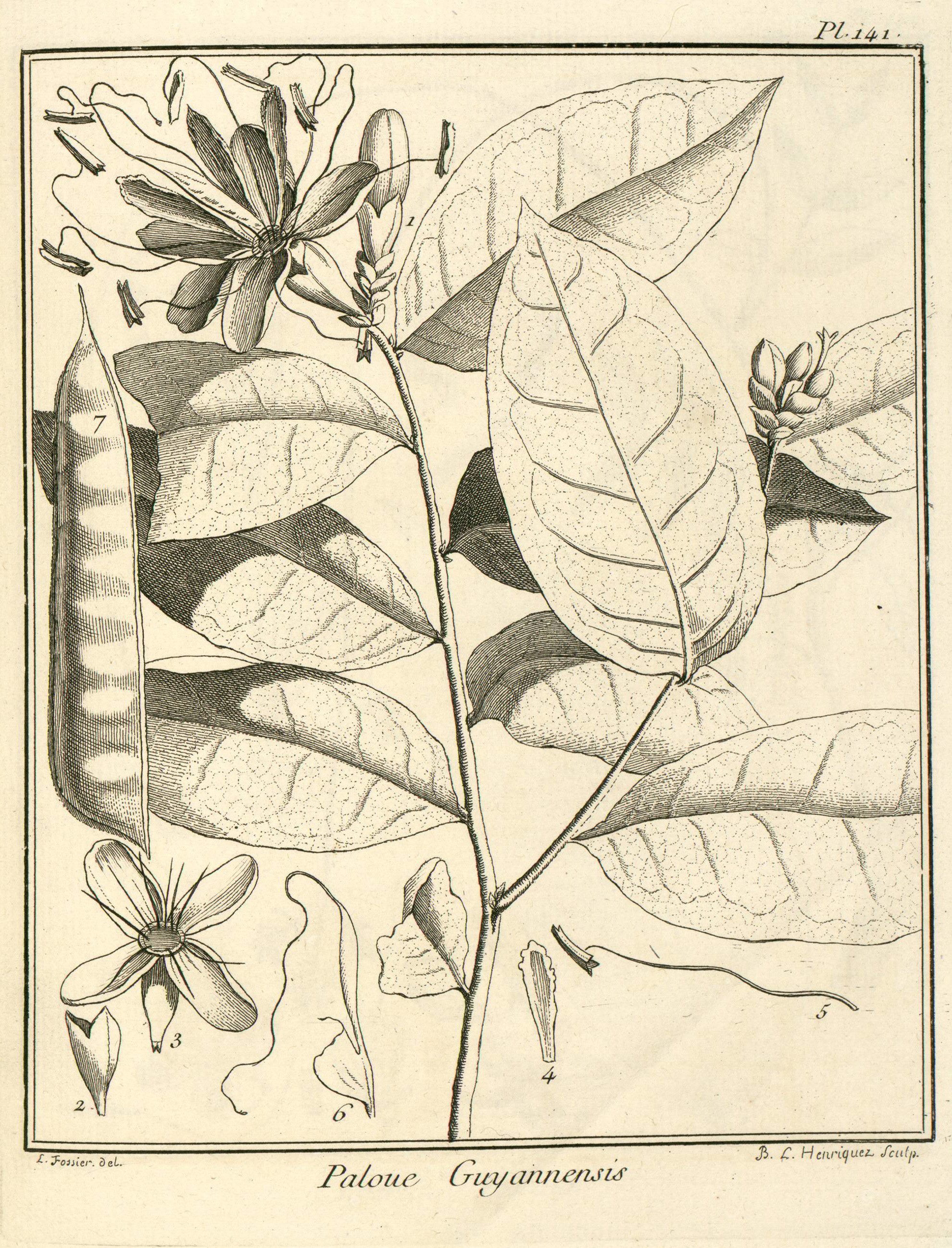
- Paloue guianensis Aublet 1775

Scientific classification
- Kingdom: Plantae
- Clade: Tracheophytes
- Clade: Angiosperms
- Clade: Eudicots
- Clade: Rosids
- Order: Fabales
- Family: Fabaceae
- Subfamily: Detarioideae
- Tribe: Amherstieae
- Genus: Paloue; Aubl. (1775)

Synonyms
- Elizabetha R.H.Schomb. ex Benth. (1840); Ginannia Scop. in Intr. Hist. Nat.: 300 (1777); Palovea Aubl. in Hist. Pl. Guiane: 365 (1775), orth. var.; Paloveopsis R.S.Cowan in Brittonia 8: 251 (1957)

= Paloue =

Genus of legumes

Paloue is a genus of flowering plants in the family Fabaceae. It belongs to the subfamily Detarioideae. The genera was first created with the description of Paloue guianensis by Aublet in 1775.

== Description ==
Paloue are large, woody trees, with simple leaves. The flowers of Paloue species have five petals and nine fertile stamens.

== Range and habitat ==
All species of Paloue are found in northern South America. More specifically, they are endemic to the Guiana Shield.

== Species ==
16 species are accepted:

- Paloue bicolor (Ducke) Redden
- Paloue brasiliensis Ducke
- Paloue coccinea (R.H.Schomb. ex Benth.) Redden
- Paloue duckei (Huber) Redden
- Paloue durissima (Ducke) Redden
- Paloue emarginata (R.S.Cowan) Redden
- Paloue fanshawei (R.S.Cowan) Redden
- Paloue × grahamiae (R.S.Cowan) Redden
- Paloue guianensis Aublet
- Paloue induta Sandwith
- Paloue leiogyne (Ducke) Redden
- Paloue macrostachya (Benth.) Redden
- Paloue paraensis (Ducke) Redden
- Paloue princeps (R.H.Schomb. ex Benth.) Redden
- Paloue riparia Pulle
- Paloue sandwithii Redden
- Paloue speciosa (Ducke) Redden
