= Tetraberlinia tubmaniana =

Conservation status
- Vulnerable (IUCN 2.3)

Scientific classification
- Kingdom: Plantae
- Clade: Tracheophytes
- Clade: Angiosperms
- Clade: Eudicots
- Clade: Rosids
- Order: Fabales
- Family: Fabaceae
- Genus: Tetraberlinia
- Species: T. tubmaniana

Binomial name
- Tetraberlinia tubmaniana J. Léonard

Species of legume

Tetraberlinia tubmaniana is a species of plant in the family Fabaceae. It is found only in Liberia. The tree is harvested from the wild for its wood, which is used locally and also traded. The species is especially interesting for forestry because of the high densities in which it occurs. In old stands the exploitable timber per hectare can be as high as 70 cubic metres.
