= Hylodendron =

Conservation status
- Least Concern (IUCN 3.1)

Scientific classification
- Kingdom: Plantae
- Clade: Tracheophytes
- Clade: Angiosperms
- Clade: Eudicots
- Clade: Rosids
- Order: Fabales
- Family: Fabaceae
- Subfamily: Detarioideae
- Tribe: Detarieae
- Genus: Hylodendron; Taub. (1894)
- Species: H. gabunense

Binomial name
- Hylodendron gabunense Taub. (1894)

Genus of legumes

Hylodendron is a genus of flowering plants in the family Fabaceae. It belongs to the subfamily Detarioideae. It contains a single species, Hylodendron gabunense, a tree native to Nigeria and west-central tropical Africa (Cameroon, Gabon, Central African Republic, Republic of the Congo, and Democratic Republic of the Congo), where it grows in Guineo-Congolian forest. It is a tall and thin-boled tree with sharp buttresses, and is armed with woody spines.
