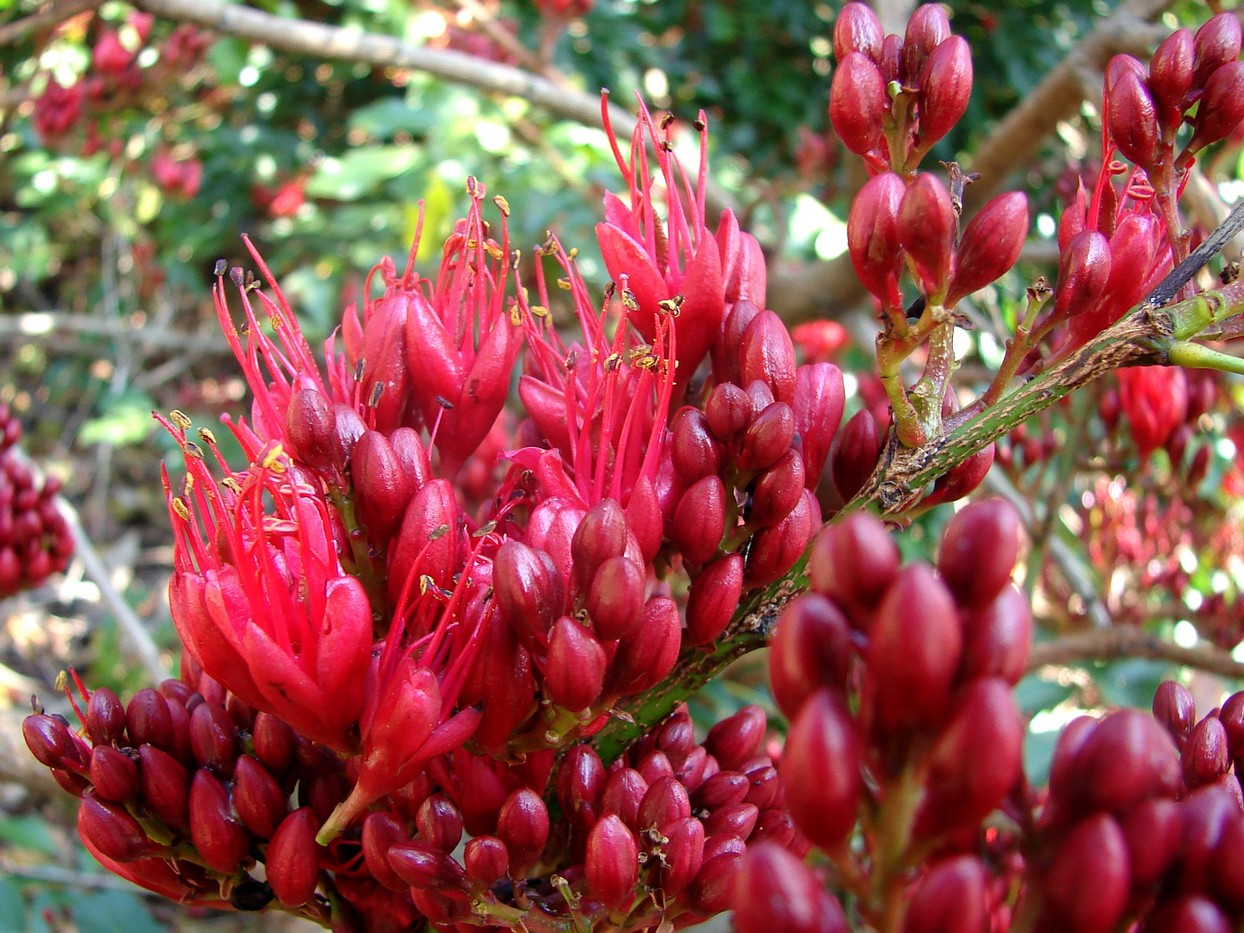
- Schotia brachypetala

Scientific classification
- Kingdom: Plantae
- Clade: Tracheophytes
- Clade: Angiosperms
- Clade: Eudicots
- Clade: Rosids
- Order: Fabales
- Family: Fabaceae
- Subfamily: Detarioideae
- Tribe: Schotieae; Strella, L.P. Queiroz & Bruneau
- Genus: Schotia; Jacq. (1787), nom. cons.

Synonyms
- Guillandinodes Kuntze (1891); Theodora Medik. (1786)

= Schotia =

Genus of legumes

Schotia is a genus of flowering plants in the legume family, Fabaceae. It belongs to the subfamily Detarioideae. It occurs in southern Africa. The genus was named for Richard van der Schot by Jacquin who was the director of the Imperial Gardens at Schönbrunn Palace, Vienna. Van der Schot was his head gardener.

== Species ==
- Schotia afra Thunb.
- Schotia brachypetala Sond.
- Schotia capitata Bolle
- Schotia latifolia Jacq.

== Uses ==
This tree can be used as a shade and ornamental tree. The leaves are browsed by stock. The seeds are edible either green, or mature. They can be used as a meal if roasted and ground. Traditionally the tree's bark has been used in tanning. It is also suitable to grow as a bonsai species.
