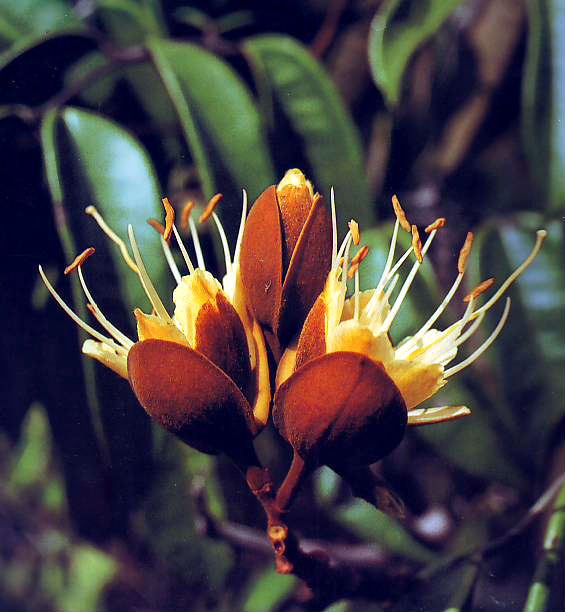
- Flower of Dicymbe leguminosae

Scientific classification
- Kingdom: Plantae
- Clade: Embryophytes
- Clade: Tracheophytes
- Clade: Spermatophytes
- Clade: Angiosperms
- Clade: Eudicots
- Clade: Rosids
- Order: Fabales
- Family: Fabaceae
- Subfamily: Detarioideae
- Tribe: Amherstieae
- Genus: Dicymbe; Spruce ex Benth.

Synonyms
- Dicymbopsis Ducke

= Dicymbe =

Genus of legumes

Dicymbe is a genus of 20 species of canopy trees in the family Fabaceae, within subfamily Detarioideae. It is found throughout the Guyana Shield region and parts of western Amazonia. Certain species within the genus are strongly associated with ectomycorrhizal fungi.

Species accepted by the Plants of the World Online as of February 2021:

- Dicymbe altsonii Sandwith
- Dicymbe amazonica Ducke
- Dicymbe arenicola W.A.Rodrigues
- Dicymbe bernardii R.S.Cowan
- Dicymbe corymbosa Spruce ex Benth.
- Dicymbe duidae R.S.Cowan
- Dicymbe fraterna R.S.Cowan
- Dicymbe froesii Ducke
- Dicymbe heteroxylon Ducke
- Dicymbe hymenaea Barneby
- Dicymbe jenmanii Sandwith
- Dicymbe mollis Barneby
- Dicymbe neblinensis R.S.Cowan
- Dicymbe paruensis R.S.Cowan
- Dicymbe pharangophila R.S.Cowan
- Dicymbe praeruptorum Barneby
- Dicymbe puncticulosa R.S.Cowan
- Dicymbe stipitata R.S.Cowan
- Dicymbe uaiparuensis R.S.Cowan
- Dicymbe yutajensis R.S.Cowan
