= Endertia =

Conservation status
- Least Concern (IUCN 3.1)

Scientific classification
- Kingdom: Plantae
- Clade: Tracheophytes
- Clade: Angiosperms
- Clade: Eudicots
- Clade: Rosids
- Order: Fabales
- Family: Fabaceae
- Subfamily: Detarioideae
- Tribe: Saraceae
- Genus: Endertia; Steenis & de Wit
- Species: E. spectabilis

Binomial name
- Endertia spectabilis Steenis & de Wit

Genus of legumes

Endertia is a genus of flowering plants in the family Fabaceae. It belongs to the subfamily Detarioideae. It contains a single species, Endertia spectabilis, a tree endemic to Borneo.
