= Neochevalierodendron =

Conservation status
- Least Concern (IUCN 3.1)

Scientific classification
- Kingdom: Plantae
- Clade: Tracheophytes
- Clade: Angiosperms
- Clade: Eudicots
- Clade: Rosids
- Order: Fabales
- Family: Fabaceae
- Subfamily: Detarioideae
- Tribe: Amherstieae
- Genus: Neochevalierodendron; J.Léonard
- Species: N. stephanii

Binomial name
- Neochevalierodendron stephanii (A.Chev.) J.Léonard

Synonyms
- Macrolobium stephanii A.Chev. Hymenostegia stephanii Baker f.

Genus of legumes

Neochevalierodendron is a genus of flowering plants in the family Fabaceae. It belongs to the subfamily Detarioideae. It contains a single species, Neochevalierodendron stephanii.

- Data related to Neochevalierodendron at Wikispecies
