= Normandiodendron =

Scientific classification
- Kingdom: Plantae
- Clade: Tracheophytes
- Clade: Angiosperms
- Clade: Eudicots
- Clade: Rosids
- Order: Fabales
- Family: Fabaceae
- Subfamily: Detarioideae
- Tribe: Amherstieae
- Genus: Normandiodendron; J.Léonard
- Species: N. bequaertii

Binomial name
- Normandiodendron bequaertii (De Wild.) J.Léonard

Synonyms
- Synonyms: Cynometra bequaertii De Wild.; Cynometra claessensii De Wild.; Cynometra purpureocaerulea Baker f.; Cynometra rubriflora De Wild.; Leonardoxa bequaertii (De Wild.) Aubrév.; Schotia bequaertii (De Wild.) De Wild.; Schotia bergeri De Wild.; Schotia kirunduensis De Wild.; Schotia rubriflora (De Wild.) De Wild.

Species of flowering plant

Normandiodendron is a monotypic genus of flowering plants belonging to the family Fabaceae. It only contains one known species, Normandiodendron bequaertii (De Wild.) J.Léonard

It is native to Angola, the Central African Republic, Congo, Gabon and Zaïre.

The genus name of Normandiodendron is in honour of Didier Normand (1908–2002), research director for tropical forests in Nogent-sur-Marne, France. He was also a specialist on tropical wood. The Latin specific epithet of bequaertii refers to Joseph Charles Bequaert (1886–1982), an American naturalist of Belgian, who taught entomology at the Harvard Medical School. Both the genus and the species were first described and published in Bull. Jard. Bot. Natl. Belg. Vol.62 on page 446–449 in 1993.
