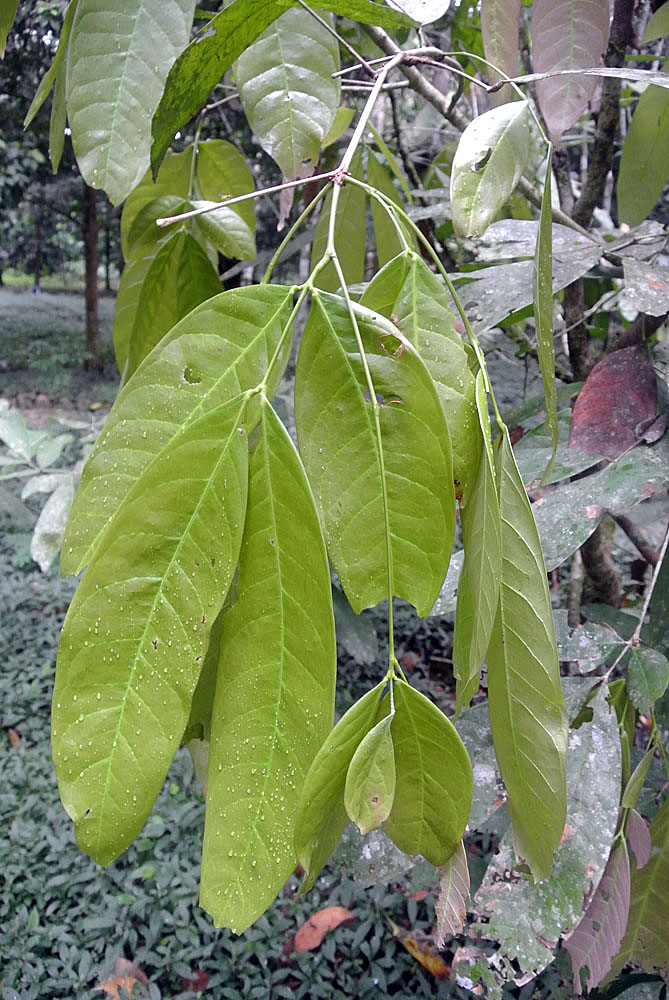

Conservation status
- Endangered (IUCN 3.1)

Scientific classification
- Kingdom: Plantae
- Clade: Tracheophytes
- Clade: Angiosperms
- Clade: Eudicots
- Clade: Rosids
- Order: Fabales
- Family: Fabaceae
- Subfamily: Detarioideae
- Tribe: Amherstieae
- Genus: Ecuadendron; D.A.Neill
- Species: E. acosta-solisianum

Binomial name
- Ecuadendron acosta-solisianum D.A.Neill

= Ecuadendron =

Genus of legumes

Ecuadendron is a monotypic genus of flowering plants in the legume family, Fabaceae, containing the single species Ecuadendron acosta-solisianum. It is endemic to Ecuador, where it is known from three populations on the coast. It is threatened because the wood is valuable and it is vulnerable to logging.
