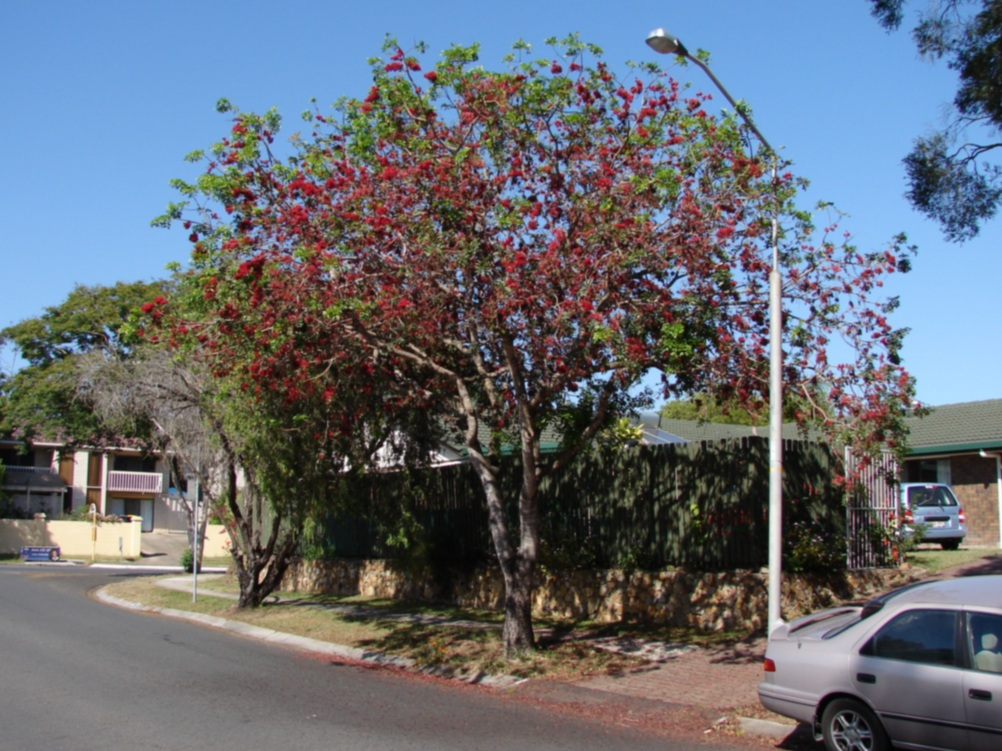

Conservation status
- Least Concern (IUCN 3.1)

Scientific classification
- Kingdom: Plantae
- Clade: Embryophytes
- Clade: Tracheophytes
- Clade: Spermatophytes
- Clade: Angiosperms
- Clade: Eudicots
- Clade: Rosids
- Order: Fabales
- Family: Fabaceae
- Genus: Schotia
- Species: S. brachypetala

Binomial name
- Schotia brachypetala Sond.
- IUCN range map Extant (resident)

= Schotia brachypetala =

Weeping boer-bean

Species of legume

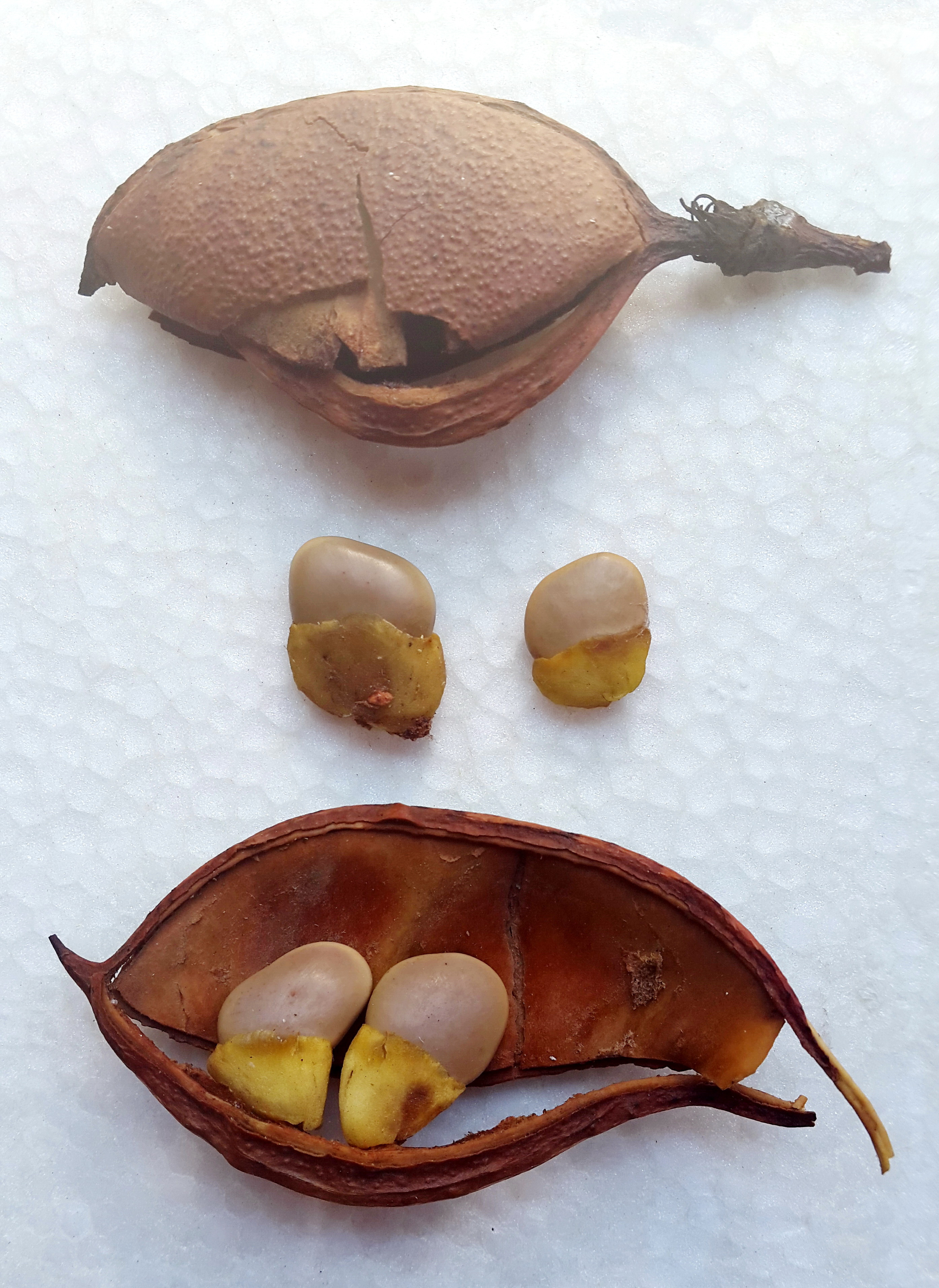
Pods and seeds

Schotia brachypetala, the weeping boer-bean, is a leguminous flowering tree in the family Fabaceae (bean family/pod-bearing family/legumes) and the subfamily Detarioideae. The woodland tree is native to Africa south of the Zambezi River, where it occurs at middle altitudes. It is well-suited as shade or ornamental tree in warmer regions, and is consequently widely cultivated in gardens and parks. It is named for the copious nectar that drips from its flowers, which attracts various species of birds and insects. It is known by various other names, including tree fuchsia, African greenheart and African walnut.

== Habit ==
A medium to large, spreading tree, growing up to 20 metres, but more commonly from 5 to 10 metres depending on conditions. Canopy spread can vary between 5 and 15 metres. Trees grown in poor soil or in very dry conditions tend to be smaller (about 5 metres tall with a 5-metre canopy spread) and more sparsely foliated. Trunk form varies from specimens with single trunks to low-branching specimens with multiple trunks. Leaves are compound, composed of four to eight pairs of leaflets. Each has an entire, wavy margin and is attached by a stem to the rachis. The bark is smooth and varies from grey to light brown from tree to tree. Flowers are numerous, a deep red, and filled with nectar. Flowers generally appear in spring, although exact flowering times vary from tree to tree. The fruit is a hard, woody pod about 15 cm long that splits on the tree releasing the seeds, each attached by a yellow aril.

== Distribution ==
A native of the southern parts of Africa, mainly sub-tropical. Its northernmost extent is the Mashonaland escarpment just south of the Zambezi valley in Zimbabwe at about 17°S. It grows southwards to the eastern parts of South Africa, generally not near the coast but usually on hills away from the coastal winds and further inland. Its southernmost extent is southwest of East London in the Eastern Cape of South Africa at about 33°S. It is a tree of woodland rather than forest.

== Ecology ==
The weeping boer-bean is nowhere very common but is usually scattered among other more dominant woodland trees. It grows best when there is ample summer rain and prefers a notable cool spell during its winter resting period. In Zimbabwe it is widespread at altitudes over 1,200 metres in areas with more than 700 mm annual rainfall, usually in Brachystegia woodland, while the best specimens grow in the midlands of Kwazulu-Natal at an altitude of about 900–1,200 metres.

Inland it is usually deciduous, especially where the winter season is very dry or there is risk of frost. The tree gets its new leaves in spring, usually early to mid-September. The new leaves are a very showy bright red as with many savanna trees. The red foliage colour fades through bronze to dark green over a period of 7 to 10 days. The red flowers are produced straight after the new leaves during September and October and are very attractive to bees. They sometimes produce so much nectar that it drips from the flowers. The "weeping" label in some of its common names refers to the copious quantities of nectar that may rain from the flowers when shaken rather than a tendency of the foliage to "weep" or "droop".

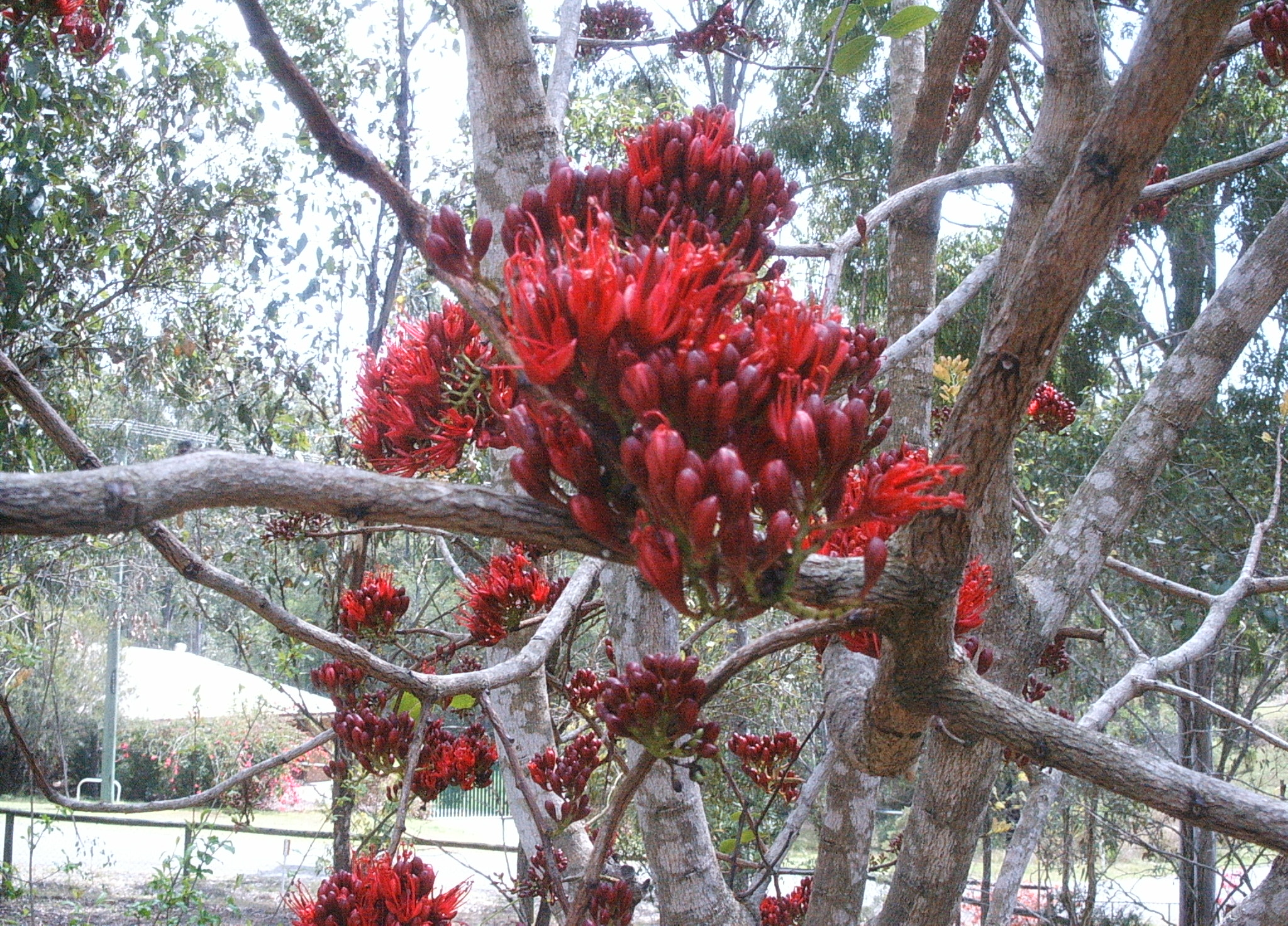
Weeping boer-bean flowers

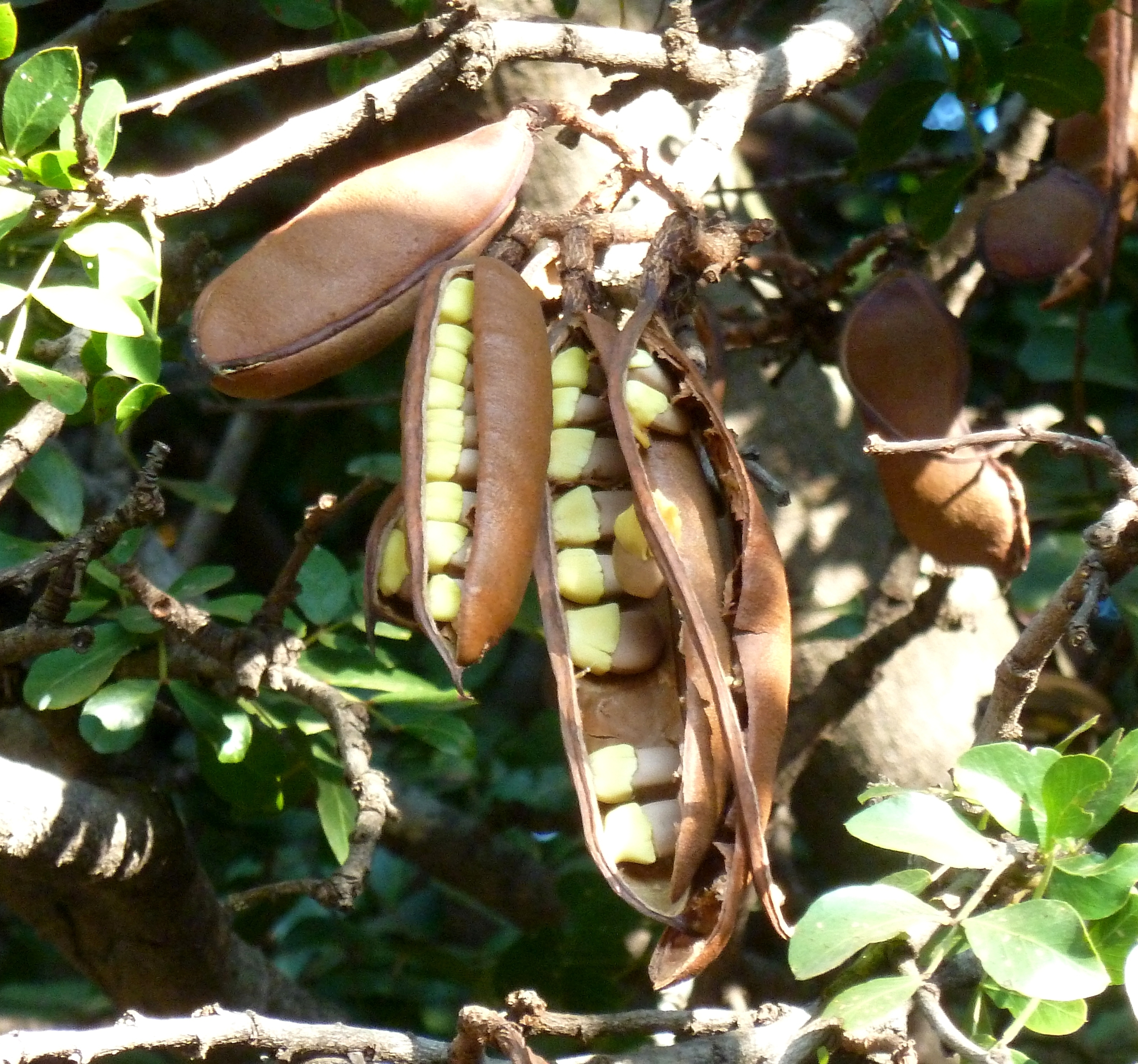
Open pods showing seeds with yellow arils

== Cultivation ==
The weeping boer-bean is easily grown, and is remarkably hardy in both poor soil and very dry conditions. Adverse conditions will affect the growth rate, with poor conditions considerably slowing the speed of growth. In good quality, well-drained soil with plenty of moisture the tree grows very quickly, easily reaching 5 metres within a few years. It is fairly widely cultivated outside its natural range in warm temperate and subtropical climates, particularly in Australia, where it is a common street tree, and sometimes still anachronistically called a Hottentot tree. It has been planted also in Spain.
