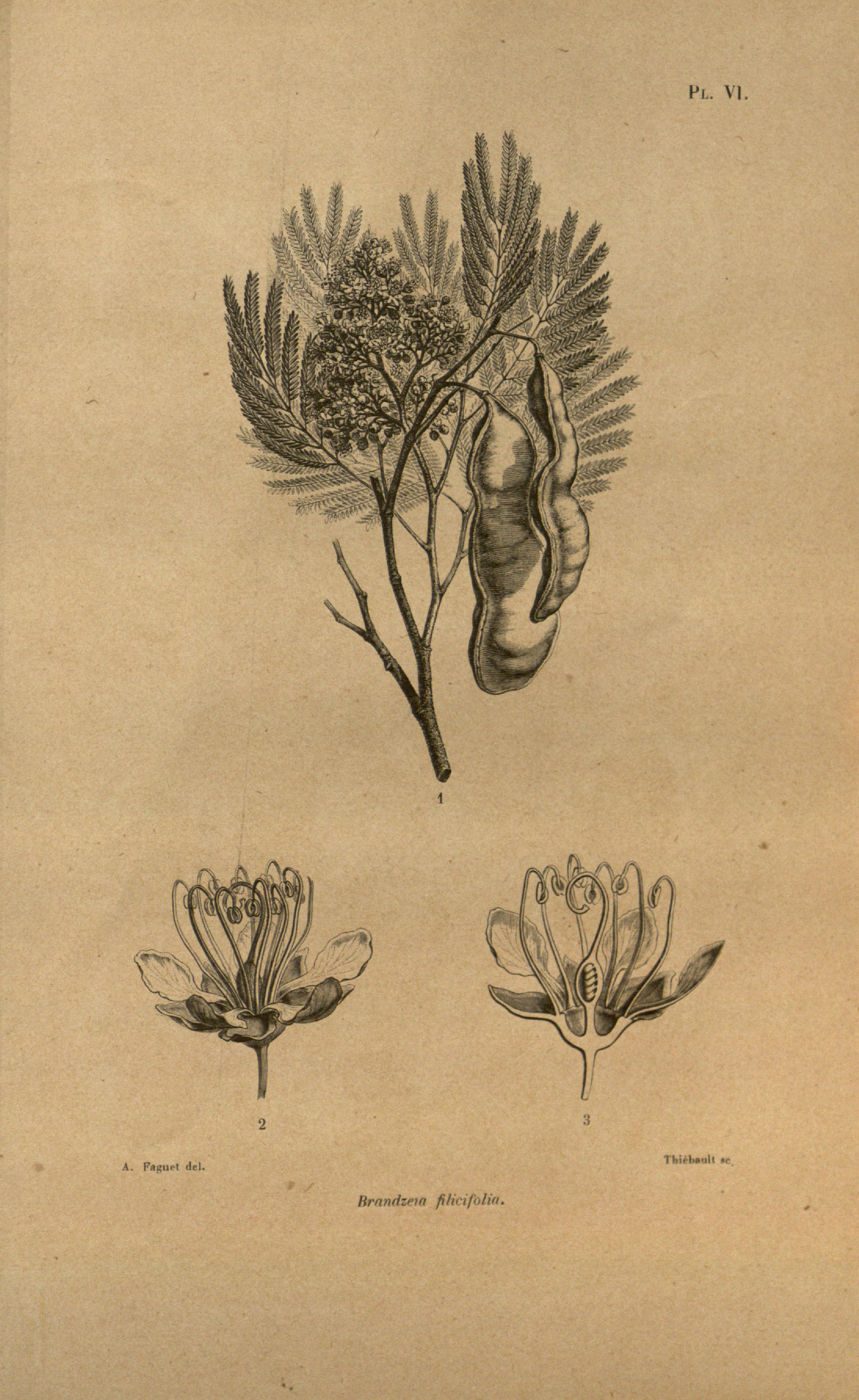
- Brandzeia filicifolia

Conservation status
- Least Concern (IUCN 3.1)

Scientific classification
- Kingdom: Plantae
- Clade: Embryophytes
- Clade: Tracheophytes
- Clade: Spermatophytes
- Clade: Angiosperms
- Clade: Eudicots
- Clade: Rosids
- Order: Fabales
- Family: Fabaceae
- Tribe: Detarieae
- Genus: Brandzeia; Baill. (1869)
- Species: B. filicifolia

Binomial name
- Brandzeia filicifolia Baill. (1869)

Synonyms
- Bathiaea Drake (1902 publ. 1903); Bathiaea rubriflora Drake (1902 publ. 1903)

= Brandzeia =

Genus of legumes

Brandzeia is a genus of flowering plants in the legume family, Fabaceae. It belongs to the subfamily Detarioideae. It has only one species, Brandzeia filicifolia, a tree native to northern and western Madagascar.

Brandzeia filicifolia is a large deciduous tree, growing to 20 to 25 meters tall. It grows in deciduous woodland, chiefly on limestone substrates including tsingy, and also on sand, basalt, and gneiss and in seasonally-inundated areas, from sea level up to 350 meters elevation.

Wood from the trees is used non-commercially for firewood and timber. The species' dry forest and woodland habitat is subject to habitat loss and fragmentation from forest clearance and over-exploitation of wood, and livestock grazing.
