= Loesenera kalantha =

Conservation status
- Vulnerable (IUCN 2.3)

Scientific classification
- Kingdom: Plantae
- Clade: Tracheophytes
- Clade: Angiosperms
- Clade: Eudicots
- Clade: Rosids
- Order: Fabales
- Family: Fabaceae
- Genus: Loesenera
- Species: L. kalantha

Binomial name
- Loesenera kalantha Harms

Species of legume

Loesenera kalantha is a species of large shrub to medium size tree in the family Fabaceae. It is found in Côte d'Ivoire and Liberia.
