= Gilletiodendron glandulosum =

Conservation status
- Vulnerable (IUCN 3.1)

Scientific classification
- Kingdom: Plantae
- Clade: Tracheophytes
- Clade: Angiosperms
- Clade: Eudicots
- Clade: Rosids
- Order: Fabales
- Family: Fabaceae
- Genus: Gilletiodendron
- Species: G. glandulosum

Binomial name
- Gilletiodendron glandulosum (Portères) J. Léonard

Species of legume

Gilletiodendron glandulosum is a species of legume in the family Fabaceae. It is found only in Mali. It is threatened by habitat loss.
