= Tetraberlinia =

Scientific classification
- Kingdom: Plantae
- Clade: Tracheophytes
- Clade: Angiosperms
- Clade: Eudicots
- Clade: Rosids
- Order: Fabales
- Family: Fabaceae
- Subfamily: Detarioideae
- Tribe: Amherstieae
- Genus: Tetraberlinia (Harms) Hauman (1952)

Genus of legumes

Tetraberlinia is a genus of plants in the legume family, Fabaceae. It includes species of trees native to west and west-central tropical Africa, including Liberia, Cameroon, Equatorial Guinea, Gabon, Republic of the Congo, Cabinda, and DR Congo. They grow in tropical lowland rain forest and riverine forest, often forming monodominant stands.

Seven species are accepted by Plants of the World Online as of September 2023:

- Tetraberlinia baregarum Wieringa
- Tetraberlinia bifoliolata (Harms) Hauman
- Tetraberlinia korupensis Wieringa
- Tetraberlinia longiracemosa (A.Chev.) Wieringa
- Tetraberlinia moreliana Aubrév.
- Tetraberlinia polyphylla (Harms) J.Léonard
- Tetraberlinia tubmaniana J.Léonard
