= Loesenera =

Scientific classification
- Kingdom: Plantae
- Clade: Tracheophytes
- Clade: Angiosperms
- Clade: Eudicots
- Clade: Rosids
- Order: Fabales
- Family: Fabaceae
- Subfamily: Detarioideae
- Tribe: Amherstieae
- Genus: Loesenera; Harms

Synonyms
- Ibadja A.Chev.

Genus of legumes

Loesenera is a genus of plants in the family Fabaceae. It includes four species of trees or shrubs native to west and west-central Africa, including Cameroon, Congo, Gabon, Ivory Coast, Liberia and Nigeria. Its habitat is tropical lowland rain forest, typically along river banks and in swampy areas.

- Loesenera gabonensis Pellegr.
- Loesenera kalantha Harms
- Loesenera talbotii Baker f.
- Loesenera walkeri (A.Chev.) J.Léonard
