= Auguste Chevalier =

French botanist (1873-1956)

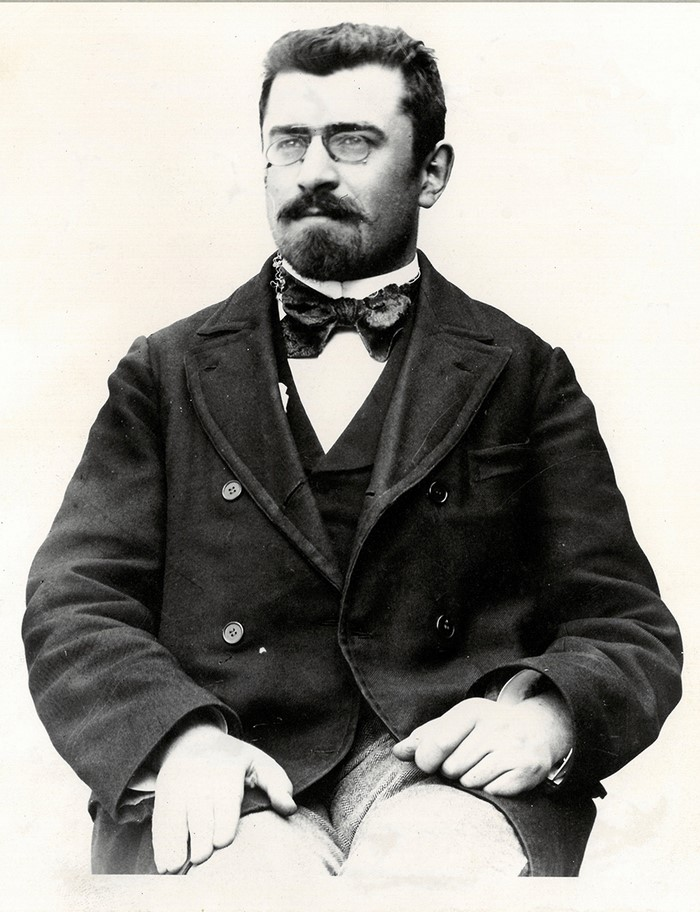
- Auguste Chevalier in 1900
- Born: June 23, 1873; Domfront
- Died: June 4, 1956 (aged 82); Paris
- Citizenship: French
- Occupation: Botanist
- Scientific career
- Author abbrev. (botany): A.Chev.

Auguste Jean Baptiste Chevalier (June 1873, in Domfront – June 1956, in Paris) was a French botanist, taxonomist, and explorer of tropical Africa, especially of French colonial empire in Africa that included Côte d'Ivoire. He also explored and collected plants in South America and tropical Asia. Chevalier was a prolific contributor to the knowledge of African plants, studying forest trees and their woods, grasses, and agricultural plants of the continent. Unlike other botanists who studied the plants of tropical Africa, Chevalier also ranged to the floral regions of the Sahara.

In 1896, he obtained his degree in natural sciences and in 1901 his PhD from the University of Lille. At Lille he worked as an assistant to botanist Charles Eugene Bertrand (1851-1917). In 1899–1900, he took part in a scientific mission in French Sudan, and in 1905 established a botanical garden in Dalaba, French Guinea. From 1913 to 1919, he collected plants throughout Indochina. Later, he attained a professorship in Paris (1929).

In 1937, he was elected as a member of the Académie des sciences, serving as its president in 1953. He was also a member of the Académie des sciences d'outre-mer (from 1922), president of the Société botanique de France (1929), vice-president of the Comité national de géographie (1935-1952) and a member of the Académie d'agriculture de France (from 1937). He was elected a Foreign Member of the Linnean Society of London.

In 1921, he founded the journal, Revue de Botanique appliquée et d'Agriculture coloniale. The botanical genera Chevalierella, Chevalierodendron, Neochevaliera and Neochevalierodendron are named in his honor.

== Selected writings ==
- Sur l'existence probable d'une mer récente dans la région de Tombouctou, 1901 - On the probable existence of a recent sea in the region of Timbuktu.
- Rapport sur une mission scientifique et économique au Chari-lac-Tchad, 1905 - Report on a scientific and economic mission involving the Chari-Lake Chad.
- La forêt vierge de la Côte d'Ivoire, 1908 - The virgin forest of the Ivory Coast.
- Mission Chari-Lac Tchad, 1902-1904: L'Afrique Centrale Française, 1908 - Chari-Lake Chad mission (1902–04); French central Africa.
- Le Pays des Hollis et les régions voisines: Mission scientifique de l'Afrique occidentale française, 1910 - The country of Hollis and neighboring regions; scientific mission to French West Africa.
- La forét et les bois du Gabon, 1917 - The forest and wood of Gabon.
- La forêt du Brésil, 1929 - The forest of Brazil.
- Les iles du Cap Vert : flore de l'Archipel, 1935 - The islands of Cape Verde; flora of the archipelago.
- L'agriculture coloniale : origines et évolutions, 1949 - Colonial agriculture, origins and evolutions.
- Octave Lignier, professeur de botanique à la Faculté des sciences de l'Université de Caen... (1855-1916). Notice biographique – Biography of Octave Lignier.
- "Histoire de deux plantes cultivées d'importance primordiale. Le Lin et le Chanvre" [History of two cultivated plants, Flax and Hemp] Revue de botanique appliquée et d’agriculture coloniale (1944)
