= Librevillea =

Scientific classification
- Kingdom: Plantae
- Clade: Tracheophytes
- Clade: Angiosperms
- Clade: Eudicots
- Clade: Rosids
- Order: Fabales
- Family: Fabaceae
- Subfamily: Detarioideae
- Tribe: Amherstieae
- Genus: Librevillea; Hoyle (1955)
- Species: L. klainei

Binomial name
- Librevillea klainei (Pierre ex Harms) Hoyle (1955)

Synonyms
- Brachystegia klainei Pierre ex Harms (1907)

Genus of legumes

Librevillea is a genus of flowering plants in the family Fabaceae. It contains a single species, Librevillea klainei, a shrub or tree native to Cabinda, Cameroon, Congo, Gabon in west-central tropical Africa. The genus belongs to the subfamily Detarioideae.
