= Sindoropsis =

Scientific classification
- Kingdom: Plantae
- Clade: Tracheophytes
- Clade: Angiosperms
- Clade: Eudicots
- Clade: Rosids
- Order: Fabales
- Family: Fabaceae
- Subfamily: Detarioideae
- Tribe: Detarieae
- Genus: Sindoropsis; J.Léonard (1957)
- Species: S. letestui

Binomial name
- Sindoropsis letestui (Pellegr.) J.Léonard (1957)

Synonyms
- Copaifera letestui (Pellegr.) Pellegr. (1947); Detarium letestui Pellegr. (1923)

Genus of legumes

Sindoropsis is a genus of flowering plants in the family, Fabaceae. It belongs to the subfamily Detarioideae. It contains a single species, Sindoropsis letestui, a tree native to Cameroon and Gabon in west-central Tropical Africa. It grows in tropical lowland rain forest.

The timber of S. letestui, known as gheombi, is used for furniture, joinery, flooring, veneers, and boxes and crates.
