= Leucostegane =

Scientific classification
- Kingdom: Plantae
- Clade: Tracheophytes
- Clade: Angiosperms
- Clade: Eudicots
- Clade: Rosids
- Order: Fabales
- Family: Fabaceae
- Subfamily: Detarioideae
- Tribe: Saraceae
- Genus: Leucostegane; Prain (1901)

Species
- Leucostegane grandis Ridl.; Leucostegane latistipulata (Prain) Prain

Genus of legumes

Leucostegane is a genus of plants in the family Fabaceae. It includes two species of trees native to western Malesia – Borneo, Sumatra, and Peninsular Malaysia.

- Leucostegane grandis Ridl. – Sumatra and Borneo
- Leucostegane latistipulata (Prain) Prain – Peninsular Malaysia
