= Oddoniodendron =

Scientific classification
- Kingdom: Plantae
- Clade: Tracheophytes
- Clade: Angiosperms
- Clade: Eudicots
- Clade: Rosids
- Order: Fabales
- Family: Fabaceae
- Subfamily: Detarioideae
- Tribe: Amherstieae
- Genus: Oddoniodendron; De Wild. (1925)

Species
- Oddoniodendron gambanum Ngok & Breteler; Oddoniodendron gilletii De Wild.; Oddoniodendron micranthum (Harms) Baker f.; Oddoniodendron normandii Aubrév.; Oddoniodendron reitsmarum Ngok & Breteler; Oddoniodendron romeroi Mendes

Genus of legumes

Oddoniodendron is a genus of flowering plants in the family Fabaceae. It includes six species of trees native to west-central tropical Africa, including Cameroon, Gabon, Republic of the Congo, Cabinda, and Democratic Republic of the Congo. They grow in lowland tropical rain forest. It belongs to the subfamily Detarioideae.
