= Loesenera talbotii =

Conservation status
- Vulnerable (IUCN 3.1)

Scientific classification
- Kingdom: Plantae
- Clade: Tracheophytes
- Clade: Angiosperms
- Clade: Eudicots
- Clade: Rosids
- Order: Fabales
- Family: Fabaceae
- Genus: Loesenera
- Species: L. talbotii

Binomial name
- Loesenera talbotii Baker f.

Species of legume

Loesenera talbotii is a species of plant in the family Fabaceae. It is found in Cameroon and Nigeria. Its natural habitat is subtropical or tropical moist lowland forests. It is threatened by habitat loss.
