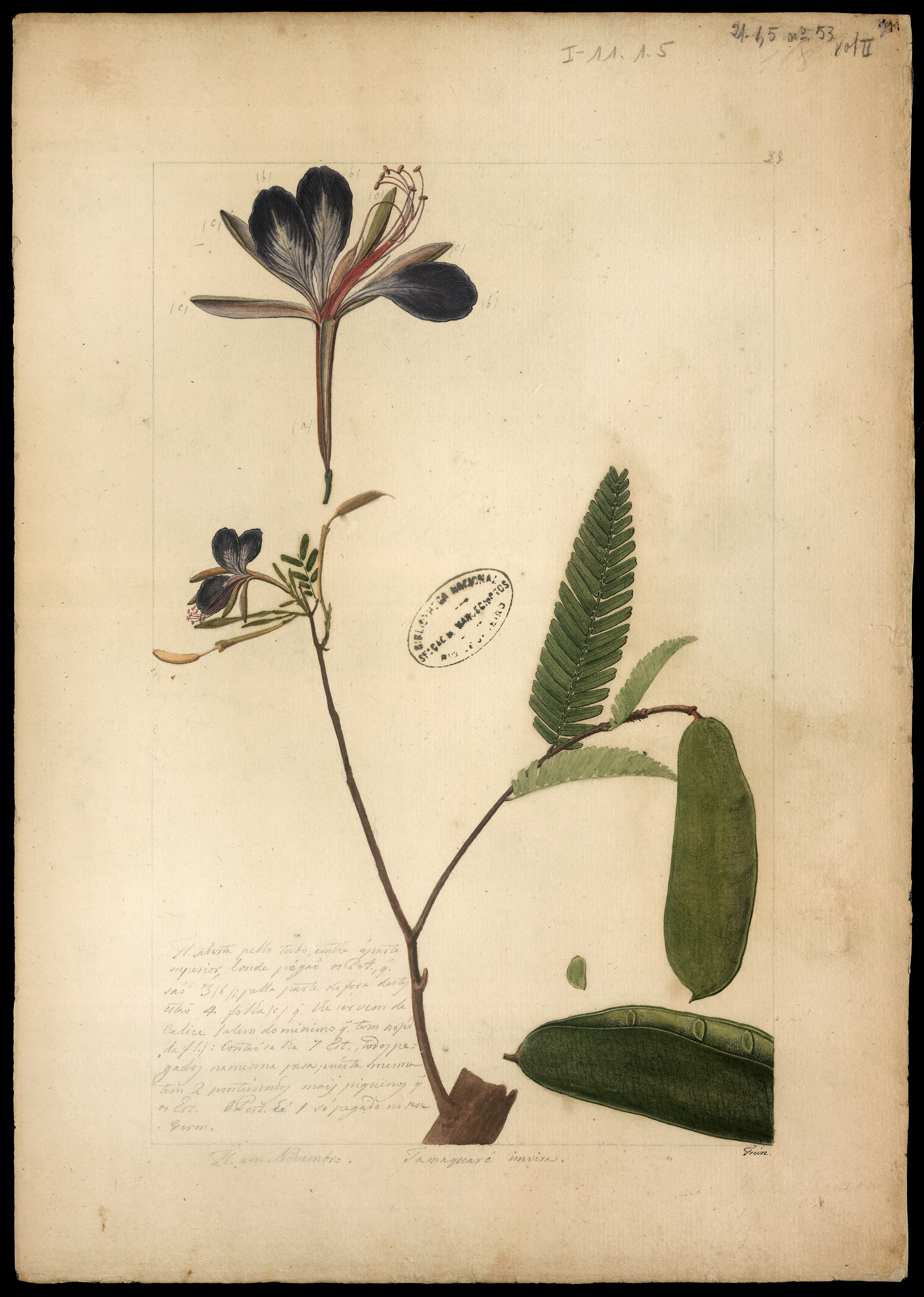
- Heterostemon mimosoides, 18th century watercolour

Scientific classification
- Kingdom: Plantae
- Clade: Embryophytes
- Clade: Tracheophytes
- Clade: Spermatophytes
- Clade: Angiosperms
- Clade: Eudicots
- Clade: Rosids
- Order: Fabales
- Family: Fabaceae
- Subfamily: Detarioideae
- Tribe: Amherstieae
- Genus: Heterostemon; Desf.

= Heterostemon =

Genus of legumes

Heterostemon is a genus of flowering plants in the family Fabaceae. It includes eight species native to northern South America, from Colombia and Venezuela to the Guianas and northern Brazil. It belongs to the subfamily Detarioideae. It is usually green and often has white dots along its leaves.

As of August 2023, eight species are accepted by Plants of the World Online:

- Heterostemon amoris Fonseca-Cortés
- Heterostemon conjugatus Spruce ex Benth.
- Heterostemon ellipticus Mart. ex Benth.
- Heterostemon impar Spruce ex Benth.
- Heterostemon ingifolius Sandwith
- Heterostemon mazarunensis Sandwith
- Heterostemon mimosoides Desf.
- Heterostemon otophorus Sandwith
