= Bikinia durandii =

Conservation status
- Vulnerable (IUCN 2.3)

Scientific classification
- Kingdom: Plantae
- Clade: Tracheophytes
- Clade: Angiosperms
- Clade: Eudicots
- Clade: Rosids
- Order: Fabales
- Family: Fabaceae
- Genus: Bikinia
- Species: B. durandii

Binomial name
- Bikinia durandii (F. Hallé & Normand) Wieringa

Synonyms
- Monopetalanthus durandii F. Hallé & Normand

Species of legume

Bikinia durandii is a species of plant in the family Fabaceae. It is found only in Gabon.
