= Lebruniodendron =

Scientific classification
- Kingdom: Plantae
- Clade: Tracheophytes
- Clade: Angiosperms
- Clade: Eudicots
- Clade: Rosids
- Order: Fabales
- Family: Fabaceae
- Subfamily: Detarioideae
- Tribe: Amherstieae
- Genus: Lebruniodendron; J.Léonard (1951)
- Species: L. leptanthum

Binomial name
- Lebruniodendron leptanthum (Harms) J.Léonard (1951)

Synonyms
- Cynometra glabra De Wild. (1925); Cynometra koko De Wild. (1925); Cynometra leptantha Harms (1907)

Genus of legumes

Lebruniodendron is a genus of flowering plants in the family Fabaceae. It belongs to the subfamily Detarioideae. It contains a single species, Lebruniodendron leptanthum, a tree native to west-central tropical Africa – Cameroon, Gabon, Republic of the Congo, and Democratic Republic of the Congo. It grows in Guineo-Congolian forest.
