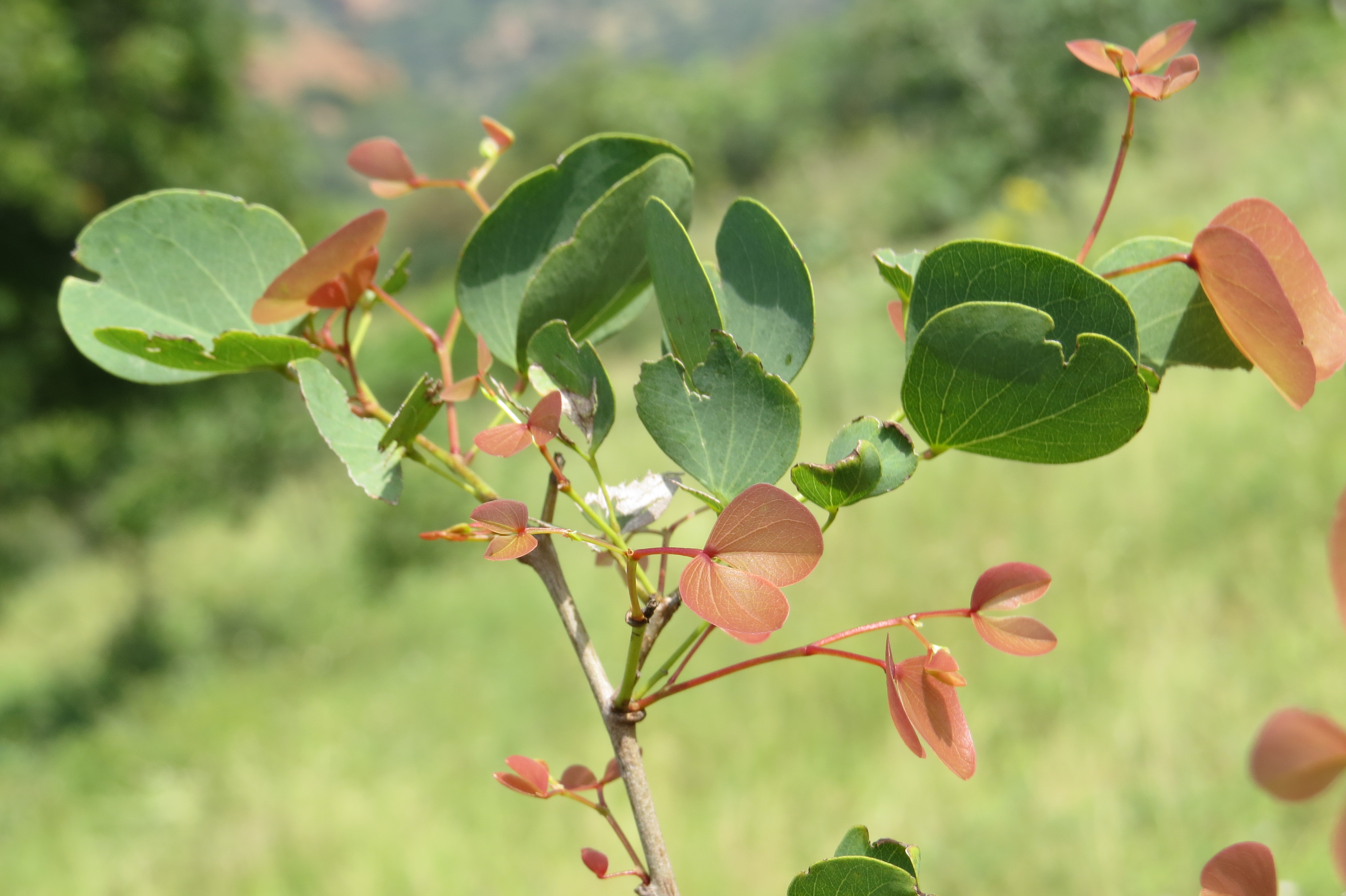
- Leaves of an anjan tree

Scientific classification
- Kingdom: Plantae
- Clade: Tracheophytes
- Clade: Angiosperms
- Clade: Eudicots
- Clade: Rosids
- Order: Fabales
- Family: Fabaceae
- Subfamily: Detarioideae
- Tribe: Detarieae
- Genus: Hardwickia; Roxb. (1811)
- Species: H. binata

Binomial name
- Hardwickia binata Roxb. (1819)

Synonyms
- Hardwickia trapeziformis Graham (1831), not validly publ.

= Hardwickia =

Genus of legumes

Hardwickia is a monotypic genus of flowering plant in the subfamily Detarioideae of the legume family, Fabaceae. The only species is the anjan, Hardwickia binata, a tree which is native to India and Bangladesh, and which grows to height of 25-30 meters. This plant genus was named after Thomas Hardwicke by William Roxburgh.

== Description ==
Hardwickia binata is a moderate-sized to large tree with drooping branches. The bark of the tree is greyish-brown in colour, rough with deep cracks and it darkens with age. The compound leaves have only two leaflets which are joined at the base. The tiny, white/greenish-yellow coloured flowers are inconspicuous and are easily overlooked. The fruits are short, flat pods about 6 cm long with a single seed attached at the end. The timber obtained from the tree is durable and termite resistant, and is the hardest and heaviest among timbers from the trees found in India. The leaves are shed in April and the new leaves emerge in early May. The flowering season is during August–September, the fruits appear after the flowering season and continue to remain till May.

== Distribution and habitat ==
It is a characteristic tree of the dry deciduous forests and can grow on shallow, gravelly soils. In India, it is found in the western Himalayas up to an elevation of 1500 m and dry open forests of Central and South India. In southern India, it is particularly found in Kadapa, Nellore and Ceded districts and in the valleys of the Cauvery and Bhavani rivers.

== Uses ==
The bark of the tree is used for making ropes.

The timber obtained from Hardwickia binata is used for making agricultural equipment like cart wheels, oil mills, pestles and ploughs.

The leaves, succulent stems, and twigs serve as fodder for livestock. The bark is found to have a good adsorption capacity for mercury, and a modification of the bark is found to be useful for the removal of mercury from water under certain conditions.

Oleo-resin extracted from the heart wood is used in manufacture of varnishes.

Resin exuding from the heartwood is used for dressing the sores of elephants.

The balsam, combined with cubebs and sandal, is used for treating sexually transmitted diseases like leucorrhoea, chronic cystitis, and gonorrhoea.

The resin (not the oleo-resin) derived from the tree is used as a diuretic

== Cultural and religious significance ==
Ropes made of Hardwickia and coconut were used to capture elephants in ancient times, according to the encyclopedic work Manasollasa or Abhilashitarthachintamani.This encyclopedia has been ascribed to the Western Chalukya King, Someshvara III, who ruled in the twelfth century AD.

Sangam poets have mentioned and described Hardwickia as yaa. According to Sangam Literature, the elephants are fond of the bark and sweet-smelling oil of Hardwickia. Hardwickia (Anajan in Sanskrit, Aacha in Tamil/Malayalam) is also mentioned in Sundara Kaandam of Valmiki Ramyana/Kamba Ramayana as one of the trees in Asokavanam where Sitadevi was kept in captivity under a Simpsupa (Amherstia nobilis) tree by the demon king Ravana.

== Taxonomy ==
The mopane tree of Africa, also monotypic in its genus, is believed to be its nearest relative, and Breteler et al. (1997) proposed that genus Colophospermum be sunk under the genus Hardwickia. Smith et al. (1998) however argued for retention of the name Colophospermum, and Léonard (1999) considered the presented evidence unconvincing.
