= Leucostegane latistipulata =

Conservation status
- Vulnerable (IUCN 2.3)

Scientific classification
- Kingdom: Plantae
- Clade: Tracheophytes
- Clade: Angiosperms
- Clade: Eudicots
- Clade: Rosids
- Order: Fabales
- Family: Fabaceae
- Genus: Leucostegane
- Species: L. latistipulata

Binomial name
- Leucostegane latistipulata (Prain) Prain

Species of legume

Leucostegane latistipulata is a species of plant in the family Fabaceae. It is a tree endemic to Peninsular Malaysia. It is threatened by habitat loss.
