= Icuria =

Scientific classification
- Kingdom: Plantae
- Clade: Tracheophytes
- Clade: Angiosperms
- Clade: Eudicots
- Clade: Rosids
- Order: Fabales
- Family: Fabaceae
- Subfamily: Detarioideae
- Tribe: Amherstieae
- Genus: Icuria; Wieringa
- Species: I. dunensis

Binomial name
- Icuria dunensis Wieringa

Genus of plants

Icuria is a genus of flowering plants belonging to the family Fabaceae. The only species is Icuria dunensis.

Its native range is Mozambique.
