= Neoapaloxylon =

Scientific classification
- Kingdom: Plantae
- Clade: Tracheophytes
- Clade: Angiosperms
- Clade: Eudicots
- Clade: Rosids
- Order: Fabales
- Family: Fabaceae
- Subfamily: Detarioideae
- Tribe: Detarieae
- Genus: Neoapaloxylon; Rauschert (1982)

Species
- Neoapaloxylon madagascariense (Drake) Rauschert; Neoapaloxylon mandrarense Du Puy & R.Rabev.; Neoapaloxylon tuberosum (R.Vig.) Rauschert

Synonyms
- Apaloxylon Drake (1902 publ. 1903), non Renault (1892)

Genus of legumes

Neoapaloxylon is a genus of flowering plants in the family Fabaceae. It includes three species of trees or shrubs endemic to Madagascar. Typical habitats include seasonally-dry tropical woodland and xerophytic scrubland on limestone or sandy soils in the northern, western, and central parts of the Island. It belongs to the subfamily Detarioideae.
