= Tessmannia densiflora =

Conservation status
- Endangered (IUCN 3.1)

Scientific classification
- Kingdom: Plantae
- Clade: Tracheophytes
- Clade: Angiosperms
- Clade: Eudicots
- Clade: Rosids
- Order: Fabales
- Family: Fabaceae
- Genus: Tessmannia
- Species: T. densiflora

Binomial name
- Tessmannia densiflora Harms

Species of legume

Tessmannia densiflora is a species of legume in the family Fabaceae. It is found only in Tanzania. It is threatened by habitat loss.
