= Polystemonanthus =

Scientific classification
- Kingdom: Plantae
- Clade: Tracheophytes
- Clade: Angiosperms
- Clade: Eudicots
- Clade: Rosids
- Order: Fabales
- Family: Fabaceae
- Subfamily: Detarioideae
- Tribe: Amherstieae
- Genus: Polystemonanthus; Harms (1897)
- Species: P. dinklagei

Binomial name
- Polystemonanthus dinklagei Harms (1897)

Genus of legumes

Polystemonanthus dinklagei is a species of flowering plant in the family Fabaceae. It is a tree native to Liberia and Côte d'Ivoire, where it grows in the humid lowland Upper Guinean forests. It is the sole species in genus Polystemonanthus. It belongs to the subfamily Detarioideae.
