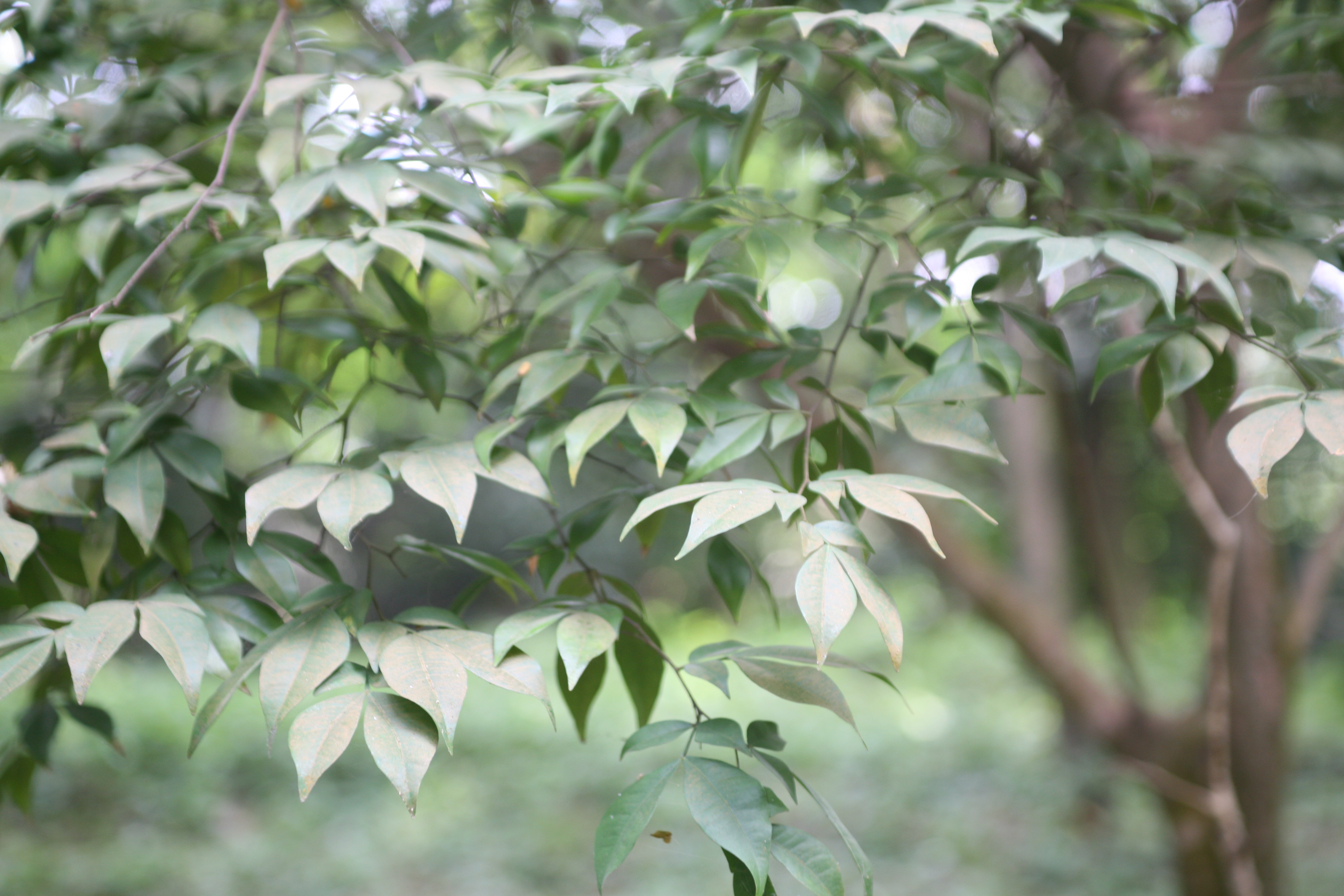
- foliage of Annea afzelii

Scientific classification
- Kingdom: Plantae
- Clade: Tracheophytes
- Clade: Angiosperms
- Clade: Eudicots
- Clade: Rosids
- Order: Fabales
- Family: Fabaceae
- Subfamily: Detarioideae
- Genus: Annea; Mackinder & Wieringa (2013)

species
- Annea afzelii (Oliv.) Mackinder & Wieringa; Annea laxiflora (Benth.) Mackinder & Wieringa

= Annea (plant) =

Genus of plants

Annea is a genus of flowering plants in the pea family (Fabaceae). It includes two species of shrubs or trees which are native to west and west-central Africa.

- Annea afzelii (Oliv.) Mackinder & Wieringa – west and west-central Africa from Guinea to Cameroon
- Annea laxiflora (Benth.) Mackinder & Wieringa – Republic of the Congo, Democratic Republic of the Congo, and Angola
