= Paramacrolobium =

Conservation status
- Least Concern (IUCN 3.1)

Scientific classification
- Kingdom: Plantae
- Clade: Tracheophytes
- Clade: Angiosperms
- Clade: Eudicots
- Clade: Rosids
- Order: Fabales
- Family: Fabaceae
- Subfamily: Detarioideae
- Tribe: Amherstieae
- Genus: Paramacrolobium; J.Léonard (1954)
- Species: P. coeruleum

Binomial name
- Paramacrolobium coeruleum (Taub.) J.Léonard (1954)

Synonyms
- Macrolobium coeruleoides De Wild. (1907); Macrolobium coeruleum (Taub.) Harms (1915); Macrolobium dawei Hutch. & Dalziel (1928); Vouapa coerulea Taub. (1894)

Genus of legumes

Paramacrolobium is a genus of flowering plants in the family Fabaceae. It belongs to the subfamily Detarioideae. It contains a single species, Paramacrolobium coeruleum.

The species is native to portions of western, central, and eastern Africa, from Guinea in the west to Kenya and Tanzania in the east, and south to Angola.
