= Bikinia =

Scientific classification
- Kingdom: Plantae
- Clade: Tracheophytes
- Clade: Angiosperms
- Clade: Eudicots
- Clade: Rosids
- Order: Fabales
- Family: Fabaceae
- Subfamily: Detarioideae
- Tribe: Amherstieae
- Genus: Bikinia; Wieringa

Genus of legumes

Bikinia is a genus of flowering plants in the family Fabaceae. It belongs to the subfamily Detarioideae. It includes ten species native to west-central Africa, from Cameroon through Gabon and Republic of the Congo to Democratic Republic of the Congo.

== Species ==
Ten species are accepted by the Plants of the World Online as of August 2023:

- Bikinia aciculifera Wieringa
- Bikinia breynei (Bamps) Wieringa
- Bikinia congensis Wieringa
- Bikinia coriacea (J.Morel ex Aubrév.) Wieringa
- Bikinia durandii (F.Hallé & Normand) Wieringa
- Bikinia evrardii (Bamps) Wieringa
- Bikinia grisea Wieringa
- Bikinia letestui (Pellegr.) Wieringa
- Bikinia media Wieringa
- Bikinia pellegrinii (A.Chev.) Wieringa
