= Gilletiodendron =

Scientific classification
- Kingdom: Plantae
- Clade: Tracheophytes
- Clade: Angiosperms
- Clade: Eudicots
- Clade: Rosids
- Order: Fabales
- Family: Fabaceae
- Subfamily: Detarioideae
- Tribe: Detarieae
- Genus: Gilletiodendron; Vermoesen (1923)

Synonyms
- Cymonetra Roberty (1954)

Genus of legumes

Gilletiodendron is a genus of plants in the family Fabaceae. It includes five species native to sub-Saharan Africa, which range from Côte d'Ivoire to DR Congo and Angola.

Species accepted by the Plants of the World Online as of August 2023:

- Gilletiodendron escherichii (Harms) J.Léonard
- Gilletiodendron glandulosum (Portères) J.Léonard
- Gilletiodendron kisantuense (Vermoesen ex De Wild.) J.Léonard
- Gilletiodendron mildbraedii (Harms) Vermoesen
- Gilletiodendron pierreanum (Harms) J.Léonard
