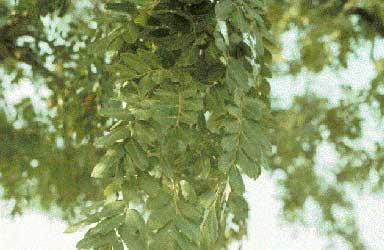
- Detarium microcarpum

Scientific classification
- Kingdom: Plantae
- Clade: Tracheophytes
- Clade: Angiosperms
- Clade: Eudicots
- Clade: Rosids
- Order: Fabales
- Family: Fabaceae
- Subfamily: Detarioideae
- Tribe: Detarieae
- Genus: Detarium; Juss. (1789)

Species
- Detarium macrocarpum Harms; Detarium microcarpum Guill. & Perr.; Detarium senegalense J.F.Gmel. – tallow-tree

= Detarium =

Genus of legumes

Detarium is a plant genus of the family Fabaceae. It contains 3 species of tree native to sub-Saharan Africa, from Senegal to Sudan and Democratic Republic of the Congo.

The genus produces timber that may serve as a mahogany substitute. The fruit is edible.
