= Augouardia =

Scientific classification
- Kingdom: Plantae
- Clade: Tracheophytes
- Clade: Angiosperms
- Clade: Eudicots
- Clade: Rosids
- Order: Fabales
- Family: Fabaceae
- Subfamily: Detarioideae
- Tribe: Detarieae
- Genus: Augouardia; Pellegr.
- Species: A. letestui

Binomial name
- Augouardia letestui Pellegr.

Genus of legumes

Augouardia is a genus of flowering plants in the legume family, Fabaceae. It belongs to the subfamily Detarioideae.

The genus has only one species, Augouardia letestui, which is endemic to Gabon, Africa.
