= Brachycylix =

Scientific classification
- Kingdom: Plantae
- Clade: Tracheophytes
- Clade: Angiosperms
- Clade: Eudicots
- Clade: Rosids
- Order: Fabales
- Family: Fabaceae
- Subfamily: Detarioideae
- Tribe: Amherstieae
- Genus: Brachycylix (Harms) R.S.Cowan (1975)
- Species: B. vageleri

Binomial name
- Brachycylix vageleri (Harms) R.S.Cowan (1975)

Synonyms
- Heterostemon vageleri Harms (1925)

Genus of legumes

Brachycylix is a genus of flowering plants in the family Fabaceae. It belongs to the subfamily Detarioideae. It contains a single species, Brachycylix vageleri, a tree endemic to Colombia.
