= Brodriguesia =

Scientific classification
- Kingdom: Plantae
- Clade: Tracheophytes
- Clade: Angiosperms
- Clade: Eudicots
- Clade: Rosids
- Order: Fabales
- Family: Fabaceae
- Subfamily: Detarioideae
- Tribe: Afzelieae
- Genus: Brodriguesia; R.S.Cowan (1981)
- Species: B. santosii

Binomial name
- Brodriguesia santosii R.S.Cowan (1981)

Genus of legumes

Brodriguesia is a genus of flowering plants in the family Fabaceae. It belongs to the subfamily Detarioideae. It contains a single species, Brodriguesia santosii. It is a tree native to eastern Bahia state in northeastern Brazil.
