= Scorodophloeus =

Scientific classification
- Kingdom: Plantae
- Clade: Tracheophytes
- Clade: Angiosperms
- Clade: Eudicots
- Clade: Rosids
- Order: Fabales
- Family: Fabaceae
- Subfamily: Detarioideae
- Tribe: Amherstieae
- Genus: Scorodophloeus; Harms (1901)

Species
- Scorodophloeus fischeri (Taub.) J.Léonard; Scorodophloeus torrei Lock; Scorodophloeus zenkeri Harms

Genus of legumes

Scorodophloeus is a genus of flowering plants in the family Fabaceae. It includes three species of trees native to tropical Africa, ranging from Cameroon to the Democratic Republic of the Congo, Kenya, and Mozambique. Habitats include tropical lowland rain forest and seasonally-dry forest, scrub forest, and wooded grassland, often along river banks. It belongs to the subfamily Detarioideae.
