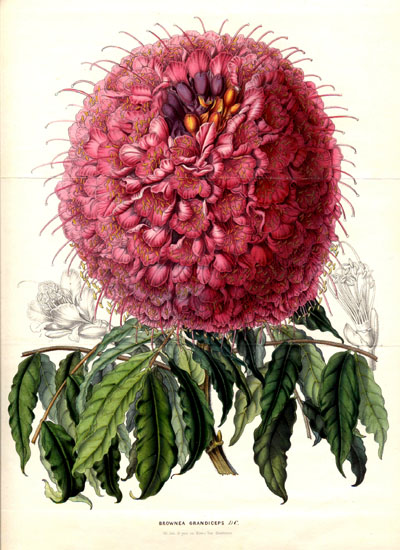
- Brownea grandiceps Lemaire 1850

Scientific classification
- Kingdom: Plantae
- Clade: Embryophytes
- Clade: Tracheophytes
- Clade: Angiosperms
- Clade: Eudicots
- Clade: Rosids
- Order: Fabales
- Family: Fabaceae
- Subfamily: Detarioideae; Burmeist. 1837

Type genus
- Detarium Juss.

Tribes
- Schotieae Estrella, L.P.Queiroz & Bruneau; Barnebydendreae Estrella, L.P.Queiroz & Bruneau; Detarieae DC.; Saraceae Estrella, L.P.Queiroz & Bruneau; Afzelieae Estrella, L.P.Queiroz & Bruneau; Amherstieae Benth.

Synonyms
- Detariaceae J. Hess; Tamarindaceae Martinov

= Detarioideae =

Subfamily of legumes

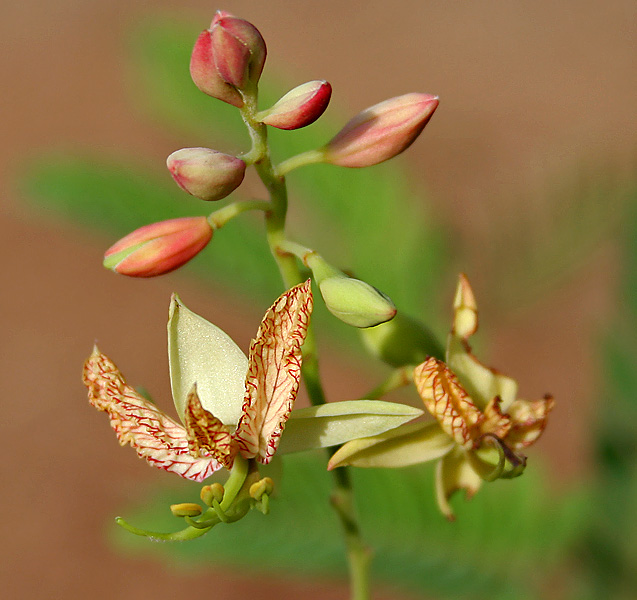
Tamarindus indica flower.

The subfamily Detarioideae is one of the subdivisions of the plant family Fabaceae (legumes). This subfamily includes many tropical trees, some of which are used for timber or have ecological importance. The subfamily consists of 84 genera, most of which are native to Africa and Asia. Pride of Burma (Amherstia nobilis) and tamarind (Tamarindus indica) are two of the most notable species in Detarioideae. It has the following clade-based definition:

The most inclusive crown clade containing Goniorrhachis marginata Taub. and Aphanocalyx cynometroides Oliv., but not Cercis canadensis L., Duparquetia orchidacea Baill., or Bobgunnia fistuloides (Harms) J. H. Kirkbr. & Wiersema.

== Taxonomy ==
Detarioideae comprises the following tribes and genera:

=== Schotieae ===
- Schotia Jacq.

=== Barnebydendreae ===
- Barnebydendron J.H.Kirkbr.
- Goniorrhachis Taub.

=== Detarieae ===
- Augouardia Pellegr.
- Baikiaea Benth.
- Brandzeia Baill.
- Colophospermum J. Kirk ex J. Léonard
- Copaifera L.
- Daniellia Benn.
- Detarium Juss.
- Eperua Aubl.
- Eurypetalum Harms
- Gilletiodendron Vermoesen
- Guibourtia Benn.
- Hardwickia Roxb.
- Hylodendron Taub.
- Hymenaea L.
- Neoapaloxylon Rauschert
- Peltogyne Vogel
- Prioria Griseb.
- Sindora Miq.
- Sindoropsis J. Léonard
- Stemonocoleus Harms
- †Salpinganthium Poinar & K.L. Chambers
- Tessmannia Harms

=== Saraceae ===
- Endertia Steenis & de Wit
- Leucostegane Prain
- Lysidice Hance
- Saraca L.

=== Afzelieae ===
- Afzelia Sm.
- Brodriguesia R.S. Cowan
- Intsia Thouars

=== Amherstieae ===
- Amherstia Wall.
- Annea Mackinder & Wieringa
- Anthonotha P. Beauv.
- Aphanocalyx Oliver
- Berlinia Sol. ex Hook. f.
- Bikinia Wieringa
- Brachycylix (Harms) R.S. Cowan
- Brachystegia Benth.
- Brownea Jacq.
- Browneopsis Huber
- Crudia Schreb.
- Cryptosepalum Benth.
- Cynometra L.
- Dicymbe Spruce ex Benth. & Hook. f.
- Didelotia Baill.
- Ecuadendron D.A. Neill
- Elizabetha Schomb. ex Benth.
- Englerodendron Harms
- Gabonius Wieringa & Mackinder
- Gilbertiodendron J. Léonard
- Heterostemon Desf.
- Humboldtia Vahl
- Hymenostegia (Benth.) Harms
- Icuria Wieringa
- Isoberlinia Craib & Stapf ex Holland
- Isomacrolobium Aubrév. & Pellegr.
- Julbernardia Pellegr.
- Lebruniodendron J. Léonard
- Leonardoxa Aubrév.
- Librevillea Hoyle
- Loesenera Harms
- Macrolobium Schreb.
- Maniltoa Scheff.
- Michelsonia Hauman
- Micklethwaitia G.P. Lewis & Schrire
- Microberlinia A. Chev.
- Neochevalierodendron J. Léonard
- Normandiodendron J. Léonard
- Oddoniodendron De Wild.
- Paloue Aubl.
- Paloveopsis R.S. Cowan
- Paramacrolobium J.Léonard
- Plagiosiphon Harms
- Polystemonanthus Harms
- Pseudomacrolobium Hauman
- Scorodophloeus Harms
- Talbotiella Baker f.
- Tamarindus L.
- Tetraberlinia (Harms) Hauman
- Zenkerella Taub.

== Phylogenetics ==
Detarioideae exhibits the following phylogenetic relationships:

- Fabales
  - Cercideae clade (outgroup)
  - Detarioideae
    - - - Schotieae
          Schotia
        - Barnebydendreae
          - Goniorrhachis
          - Barnebydendron
      - Detarieae
        - - - Hardwickia
            - Colophospermum
          - Prioria
        - - - Brandzeia
            - Daniellia
          - Detarieaesensu stricto
            - - - Stemonocoleus
                - Augouardia
              - - Eurypetalum
                - Eperua
            - - - Peltogyne
                - - Guibourtia pro parte
                  - - Hymenaea
                    - Guibourtia pro parte
              - - - Hylodendron
                  - Gilletiodendron
                - - Baikiaea
                  - - - Detarium
                      - Sindoropsis
                    - Copaifera
                    - Sindora
                    - Tessmannia
    - - Saraceae
        - - Endertia
          - Lysidice
        - Saraca
      - - Afzelieae
          - Brodriguesia
          - - Afzelia
            - Intsia
        - Amherstieae
          - Amherstia
          - Brownea Clade
            - - - Elizabetha
                - Heterostemon
              - Macrolobium
            - - Ecuadendron
              - Brownea
              - Paloue
          - - Tamarindus
            - Humboldtia
            - - Paramacrolobium
              - Cryptosepalum
            - - Polystemonanthus
              - Dicymbe
            - - Cynometra pro parte
              - - Loesenera
                - - Talbotiella
                  - - Leonardoxa
                    - Hymenostegia
            - - Zenkerella
              - - - Gabonius
                  - - Annea
                    - Scorodophloeus
                - - Crudia pro parte
                  - - Neochevalierodendron
                    - Crudia pro parte
              - - Normandiodendron
                - Plagiosiphon
                - - Cynometra pro parte
                  - Maniltoa
            - - - - Englerodendron
                  - Anthonotha
                - - Oddoniodendron
                  - Isoberlinia
                  - - Berlinia
                    - Microberlinia + "Babjit" Clade
                      - - Microberlinia
                        - Brachystegia
                      - - Julbernardia
                        - - Icuria
                          - Aphanocalyx
                        - - Tetraberlinia
                          - Bikinia
              - - Didelotia
                - - Librevillea
                  - Gilbertiodendron
