= Guineo-Congolian region =

Biogeographical region in Africa

The Guineo-Congolian region is a biogeographical region in Africa straddling the Equator and stretching from the Atlantic Ocean through the Congo Basin to the Congo / Nile divide in Rwanda and Burundi. Formerly, this region was largely covered in rain forest, on both well-drained sites and in swamp forests, but little undisturbed primary forest now remains, having been replaced in many areas by savanna and secondary-growth forest.

== Description ==
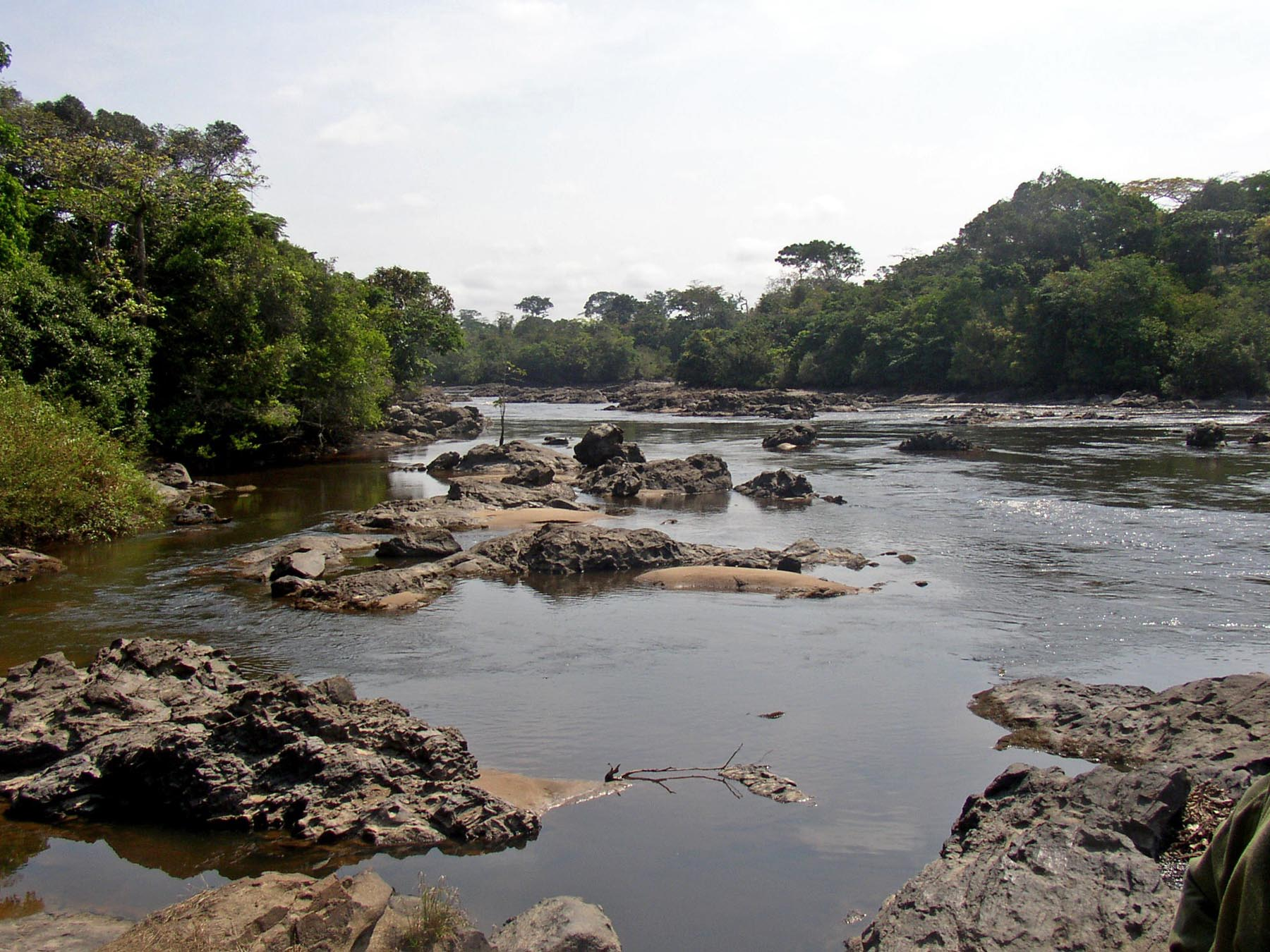
Epulu River flowing through Okapi Wildlife Reserve, Democratic Republic of the Congo

The Guineo-Congolian region is a tropical, lowland rain forest area, typified by the forests of the Congo Basin. The terrain is generally under 1,000 m (3,300 ft) and the annual rainfall is typically in the range 1,600 to 2,000 mm (63 to 79 in). The forest is tall with a dense canopy, 30 m (100 ft) or more above the ground, with emergent trees up to 60 m (200 ft) tall, and with several layers. The constituent trees are mostly evergreen or semi-evergreen, with a scattering of deciduous species. In the wetter areas, the trees may be clad with numerous epiphytes, but these are less common in drier areas. Large trees typical of these forests include Entandrophragma spp., Guarea cedrata, Guarea thompsonii, Lovoa trichilioides, Maranthes glabra, Parkia bicolor, Pericopsis elata and Petersianthus macrocarpus. Some parts of the forest are dominated by a single species, typically a member of the Fabaceae, such as Brachystegia laurentii, Cynometra alexandri, Gilbertiodendron dewevrei, Julbernardia seretii or Michelsonia microphylla, which form extensive monodominant stands. In places in the Ituri Rainforest of northeastern Democratic Republic of the Congo, G. dewevrei forms 90% of the tree species present in the canopy.

The floras of the Guineo-Congolian region and the adjoining Zambezian Region are for the most part almost mutually exclusive, apart from a small number of cosmopolitan species and a few others. However, there is a transition zone where the two floras, each in an impoverished form, intermingle or occur in a mosaic pattern, influenced by climatic factors and soil types. This makes it difficult to define an exact boundary between the two regions.

== Subdivisions ==
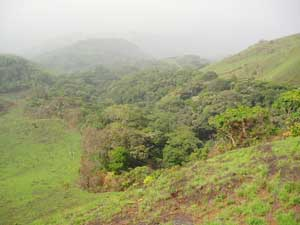
Gallery forest in the Simandou Range, Guinea

Several forest types can be distinguished. Hygrophilous coastal evergreen forests occur in moist locations between Sierra Leone and Gabon in an intermittent coastal strip; these forests are often rich in legume family species which may regenerate freely and form pure stands. Mixed moist semi-evergreen forests occur extensively, especially in the Congo Basin, in somewhat drier locations. Drier peripheral semi-evergreen forest border the mixed moist forests to north and south and are subject to fire damage from adjoining savanna regions. Monospecific forests occur as patches in evergreen or semi-evergreen forests in the Congo Basin. Gallery forests and swamp forests occur where conditions are suitable but have more open canopies. Short forest and scrub forest occur on rocky hills and areas with thin soils.

== Floristic provinces ==
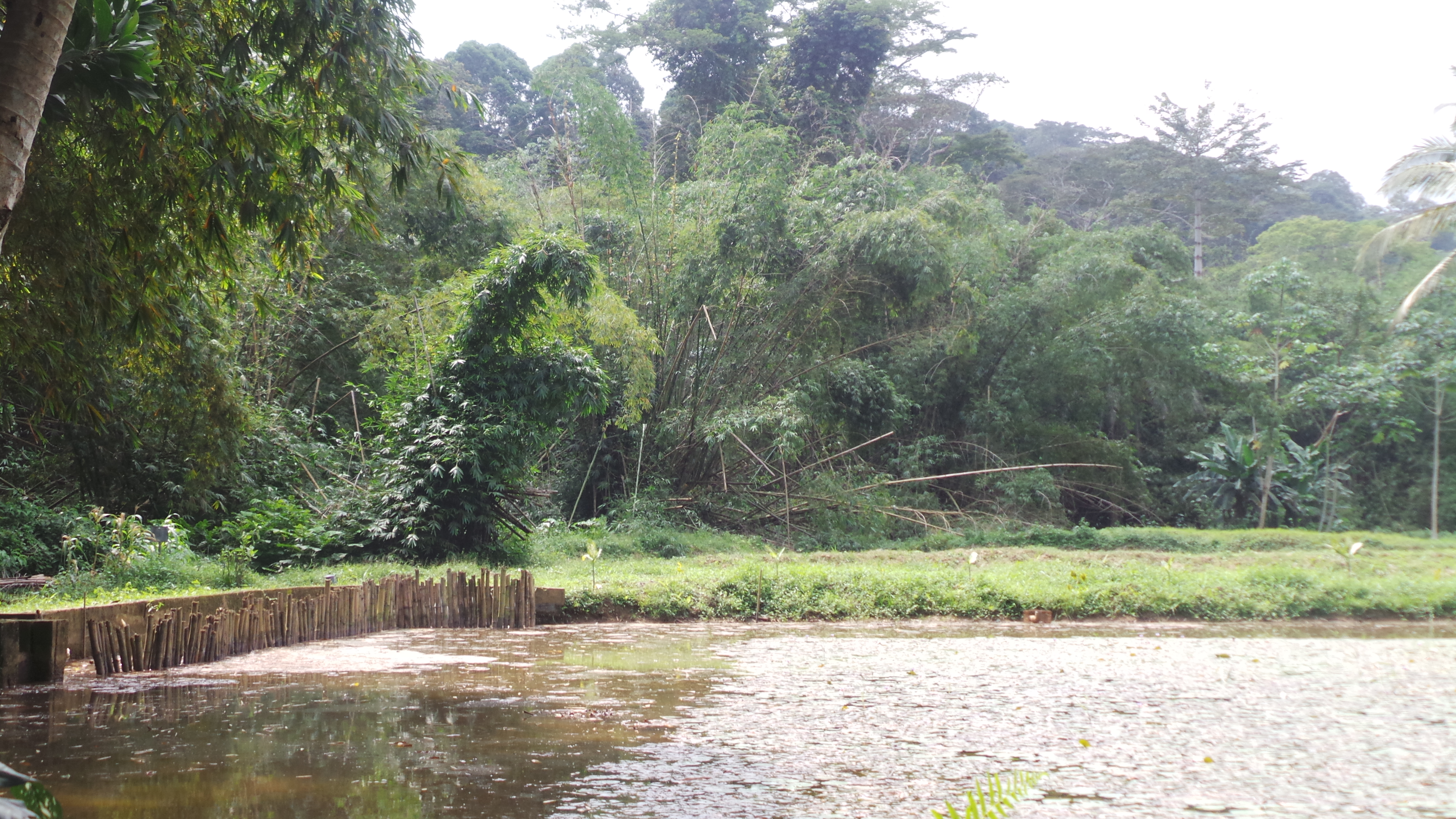
Banco Forest seen from a fish farm, Ivory Coast

- The Upper Guinean forests province is a tropical seasonal forest region of West Africa. The Upper Guinean forests extend from Guinea and Sierra Leone in the west through Liberia, Côte d'Ivoire and Ghana to Togo in the east, and a few hundred kilometres inland from the Atlantic coast. A few enclaves of montane forest lie further inland in the mountains of central Guinea and central Togo and Benin. The Upper Guinean forests are bounded on the east by the Dahomey Gap, a region of Ghana and Benin where the drier forest-savanna mosaic extends all the way to the coast, separating the Upper Guinean and Lower Guinean forest blocs.
- The Nigerian-Cameroonian province, also known as the Lower Guinean forests, extend through portions of Togo, Nigeria, and Cameroon, from the Dahomey Gap to the Sanaga River in Cameroon.
- The Congolian province, which extends along the Atlantic coast from the Sanaga River to the mouth of the Congo River, and east across the central Congo Basin.

The Kakamega forest in western Kenya is the most easterly remnant of the Guineo-Congolian rainforest system

== See also ==
- Guinean Forests of West Africa
- Phytochorion
