= Michelsonia =

Conservation status
- Vulnerable (IUCN 3.1)

Scientific classification
- Kingdom: Plantae
- Clade: Tracheophytes
- Clade: Angiosperms
- Clade: Eudicots
- Clade: Rosids
- Order: Fabales
- Family: Fabaceae
- Subfamily: Detarioideae
- Tribe: Amherstieae
- Genus: Michelsonia; Hauman (1952)
- Species: M. microphylla

Binomial name
- Michelsonia microphylla (Troupin) Hauman (1952)

Synonyms
- Julbernardia microphylla Troupin (1950); Tetraberlinia microphylla (Troupin) Aubrev. (1968)

Genus of legumes

Michelsonia is a genus of tree in the legume family, Fabaceae, where it is classified in the subfamily Detarioideae. It is a monotypic genus, the only species being Michelsonia microphylla. It is native to the tropical rain forests of the Democratic Republic of the Congo. The wood is used locally for construction work.

== Description ==
Michelsonia microphylla is a medium to large tree with a spreading crown, growing to a height of 30 m (100 ft) or more. The trunk is cylindrical and bare of branches for the first 12 m (40 ft). It can grow to a diameter of about 80 cm (2.6 ft), the base flaring out a little and sometimes having small buttresses. The pinnate leaves are alternate and have ten to sixteen pairs of leaflets. The compound inflorescences are at the tips of the shoots and the individual flowers have white petals about 5 mm (0.2 in) long, and are followed by flat, glossy brown, woody pods up to 10 cm (4 in) long. These are so heavy that they sink in water. This tree is similar in appearance to Tetraberlinia baregarum, with which it can be confused.

== Ecology ==
This tree is one of several species in the family Fabaceae that form monodominant stands in the rainforests of the Democratic Republic of the Congo, either singly, or in conjunction with Brachystegia laurentii, Cynometra alexandri, Gilbertiodendron dewevrei or Julbernardia seretii. In 1983, it occurred throughout the Congo Basin. In the foothills of the Rwenzori Mountains, between about 1,000 and 1,350 m (3,280 and 4,430 ft), it was co-dominant with Staudtia stipitata and Julbernardia seretii, and was abundant at higher elevations. However it has become much rarer and is no longer plentiful in its previous habitats.
