= Tropical and subtropical moist broadleaf forests =

Habitat type defined by the World Wide Fund for Nature

Distribution of tropical and subtropical moist broadleaf forests

Tropical and subtropical moist broadleaf forests (TSMF), also known as tropical moist forest, is a subtropical and tropical forest habitat type defined by the World Wide Fund for Nature (WWF).

== Description ==
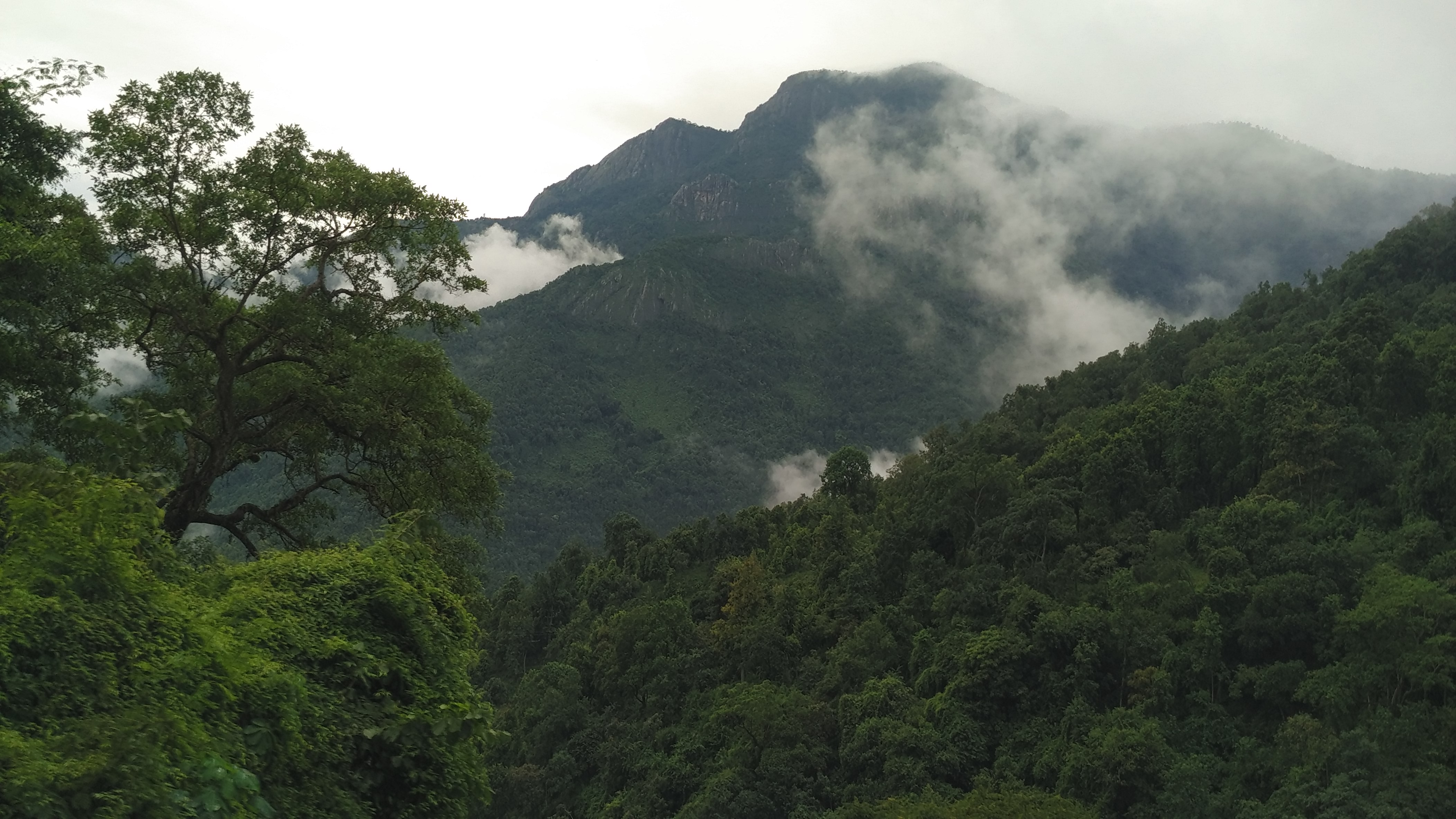
Moist broadleaf forest in Mudumalai National Park

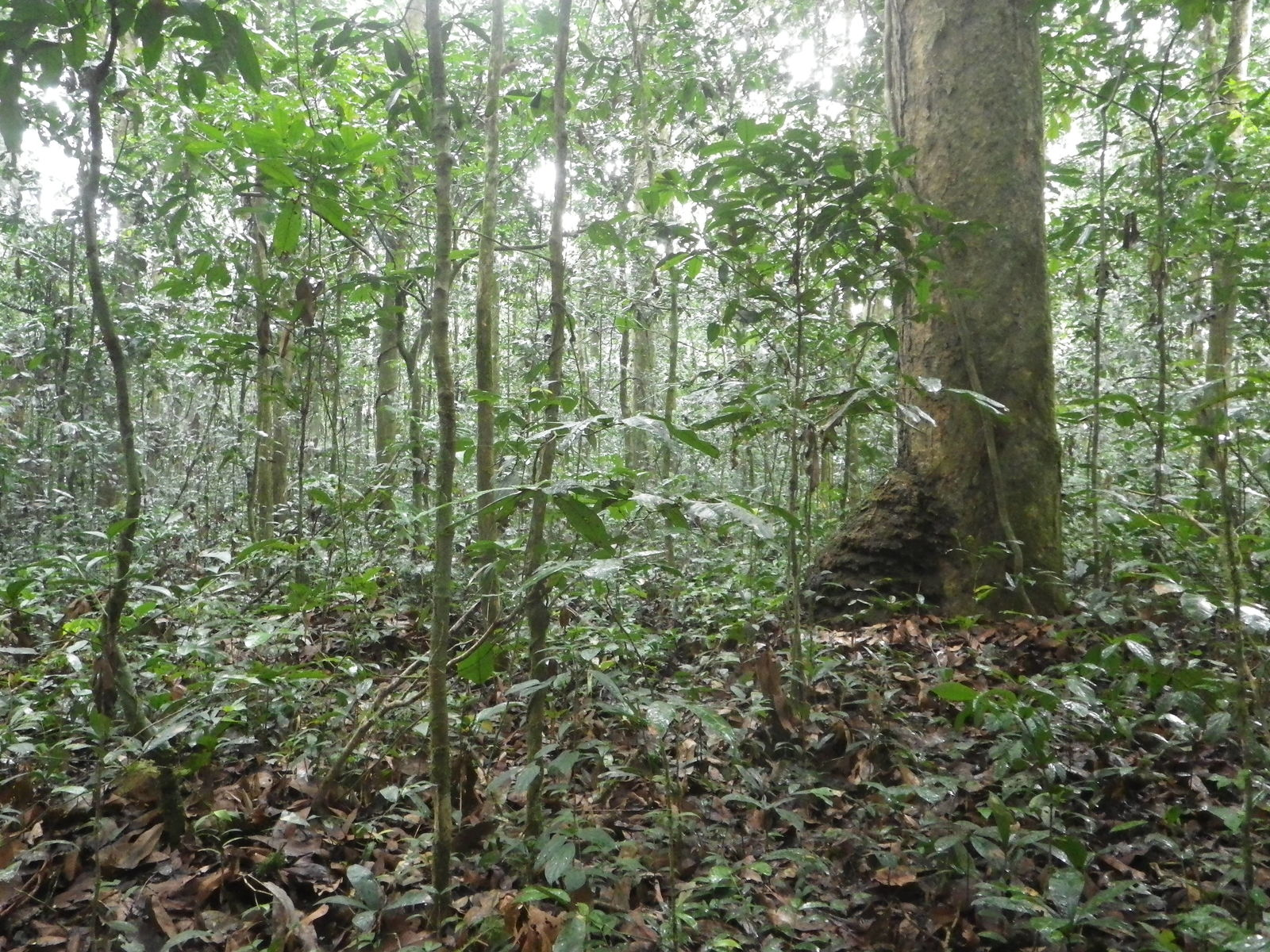
Congolian rainforest dominated by Gilbertiodendron dewevrei, near Isiro

TSMF is generally found in large, discontinuous patches centered on the equatorial belt and between the Tropic of Cancer and Tropic of Capricorn. TSMF are characterized by low variability in annual temperature and high levels of rainfall of more than 2,000 mm (79 in) annually. Forest composition is dominated by evergreen and semi-deciduous tree species.

These forests are home to more species than any other terrestrial ecosystem on Earth: Half of the world's species may live in these forests, where a square kilometer may be home to more than 1,000 tree species. These forests are found around the world, particularly in the Indo-Malayan Archipelago, the Amazon Basin, and the African Congo Basin.

The perpetually warm, wet climate makes these environments more productive than any other terrestrial environment on Earth and promotes explosive plant growth. A tree here may grow over 23 m (75 ft) in height in just 5 years. From above, the forest appears as an unending sea of green, broken only by occasional, taller "emergent" trees. These towering emergents are the realm of hornbills, toucans, and the harpy eagle.

Generally, biodiversity is highest in the forest canopy. The canopy can be divided into five layers: overstory canopy with emergent crowns, a medium layer of canopy, lower canopy, shrub level, and finally understory.

The canopy is home to many of the forest's animals, including apes and monkeys. Below the canopy, a lower understory hosts snakes and big cats. The forest floor, relatively clear of undergrowth due to the thick canopy above, is stalked by other animals such as gorillas and deer.

All levels of these forests contain an unparalleled diversity of invertebrate species, including New Guinea's stick insects and butterflies that can grow over 30 cm (1 ft) in length.

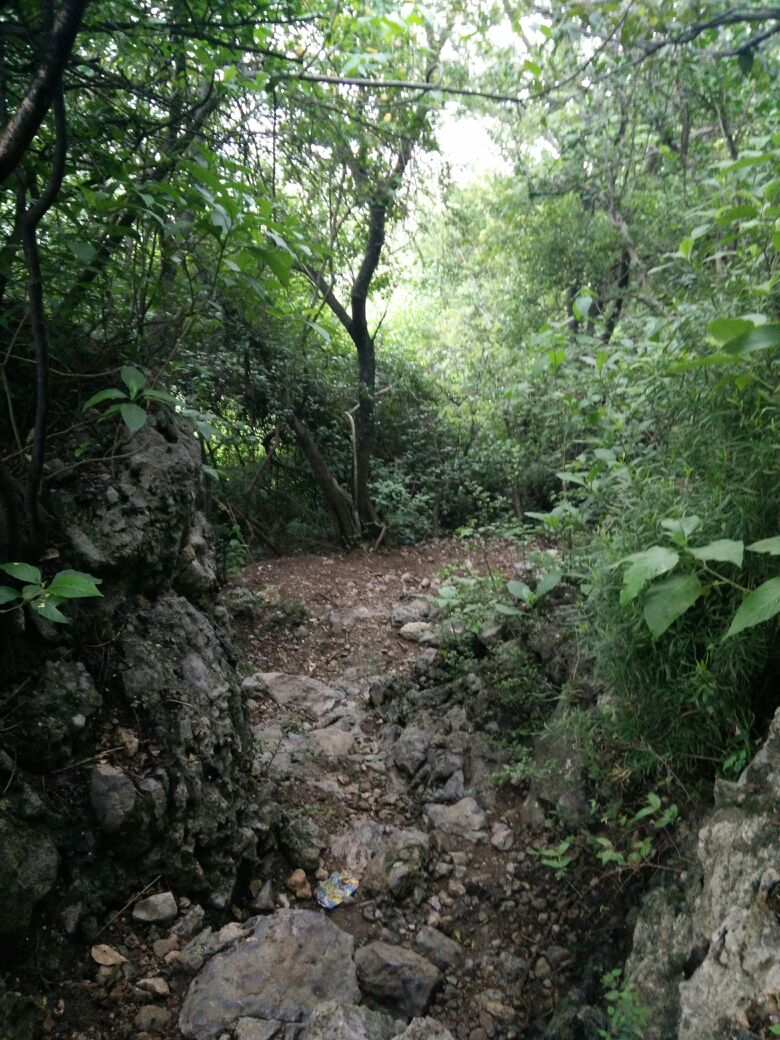
Thick vegetation of forests in the Margalla Hills

Many forests are being cleared for farmland, while others are subject to large-scale commercial logging. An area the size of Ireland is destroyed every few years.

== Types ==
Tropical and subtropical moist forests (TSMF) as shown within the Holdridge Life Zones classification scheme, and includes moist forests, wet forests, and rainforests.

The biome includes several types of forests:

- Lowland equatorial evergreen rain forests, commonly known as tropical rainforests, are forests which receive high rainfall (tropical rainforest climate with more than 2000 mm, or 80 inches, annually) throughout the year. These forests occur in a belt around the equator, with the largest areas in the Amazon basin of South America, the Congo Basin of central Africa, the Wet Tropics of Queensland in Australia and parts of the Malay Archipelago. About half of the world's tropical rainforests are in the South American countries of Brazil and Peru. Rainforests now cover less than 6% of Earth's land surface. Scientists estimate that more than half of all the world's plant and animal species live in tropical rainforests.
- Tropical seasonal forests, also known as moist deciduous, monsoon or semi-evergreen (mixed) seasonal forests, have a monsoon or wet savannah climates (as in the Köppen climate classification): receiving high overall rainfall with a warm summer wet season and (often) a cooler winter dry season. Some trees in these forests drop some or all of their leaves during the winter dry season. These forests are found in South Florida, parts of South America, in Central America and around the Caribbean, in coastal West Africa, parts of the Indian subcontinent, Northern Australia and across much of Indochina.
- Montane rain forests are found in cooler-climate mountainous areas. Those with elevations high enough to regularly encounter low-level cloud cover are known as cloud forests.
- Flooded forests, including freshwater swamp forests and peat swamp forests.
- Manigua a low, often impenetrable dense forest of tangled tropical shrub and small trees. It is usually found in marshy areas but also on dry land in certain places. The term is used in Cuba, the Dominican Republic, Puerto Rico and Colombia.

== Notable ecoregions ==
A number of TSMF ecoregions are notable for their biodiversity and endemism:

- Southwest Amazon moist forests in Brazil, Peru and Bolivia
- Atlantic Forest in Brazil, Argentina and Paraguay
- Chocó–Darién moist forests in Colombia and Panama
- The Wet Tropics of Queensland in Australia
- Northwestern Andean montane forests of Colombia and Ecuador
- Guayanan Highlands moist forests
- Cuban moist forests
- Veracruz moist forests in Mexico
- Congolese rainforests
- Upper Guinean forests
- Albertine Rift montane forests from Uganda to Burundi
- Eastern Arc forests of Kenya and Tanzania
- Coastal forests of eastern Africa from Somalia to Mozambique
- Madagascar subhumid forests
- Puerto Rican moist forests
- Sri Lanka lowland rain forests
- Peninsular Malaysian peat swamp forests
- Borneo peat swamp forests
- New Caledonia rain forests
- Western Ghats
- Pilibhit Tiger Reserve

== See also ==
- Tropical dry broadleaf forest
- Tropical coniferous forests
- Center for Tropical Forest Science (CTFS)
- International Tropical Timber Organization (ITTO)
- Monodominance
- Trees of the world
- Tropical vegetation
- Cloud forest
