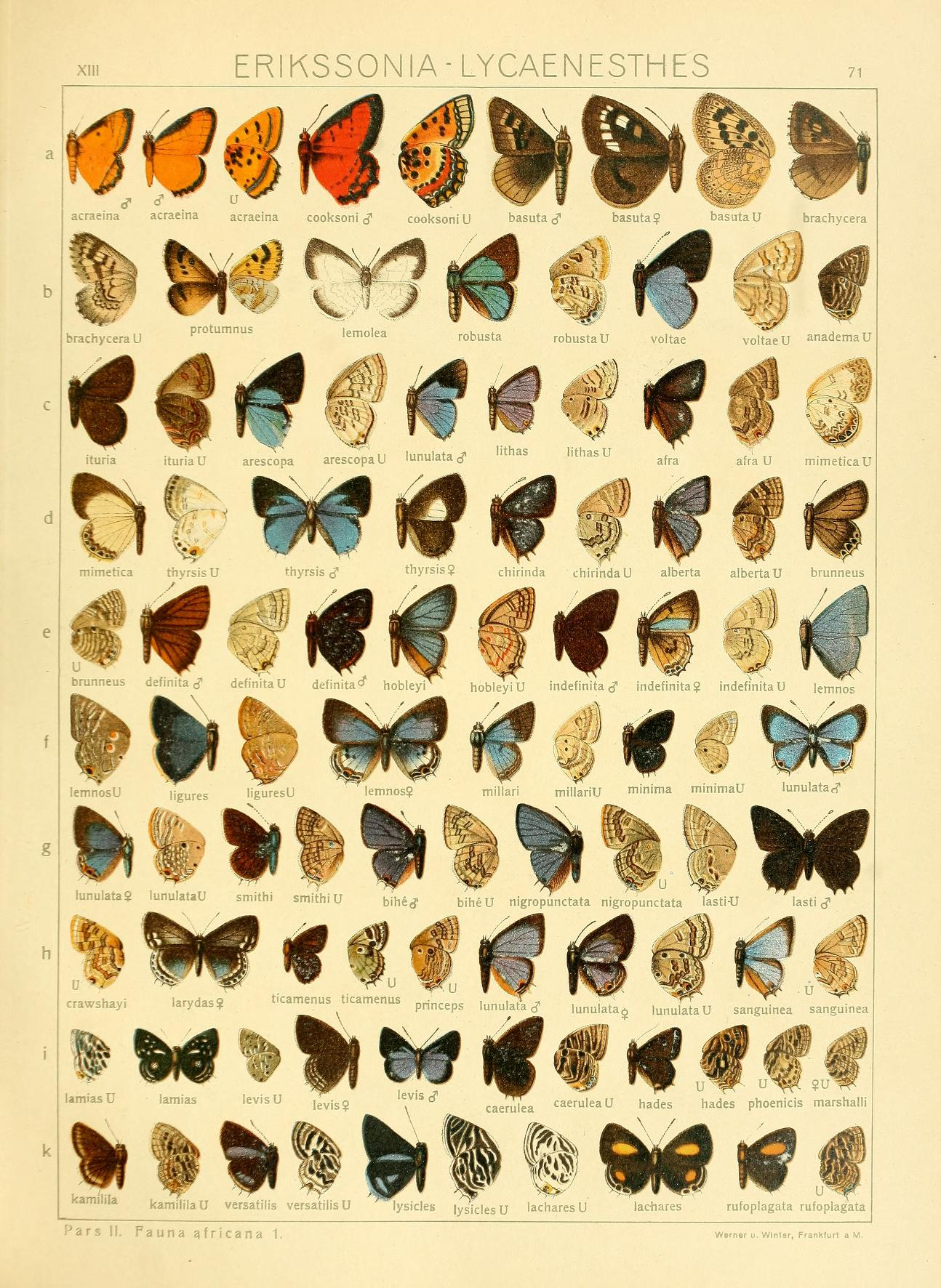

Scientific classification
- Kingdom: Animalia
- Phylum: Arthropoda
- Clade: Pancrustacea
- Class: Insecta
- Order: Lepidoptera
- Family: Lycaenidae
- Genus: Anthene
- Species: A. lunulata

Binomial name
- Anthene lunulata (Trimen, 1894)

Synonyms
- Lycaenesthes lunulata Trimen, 1894; Anthene (Anthene) lunulata; Lycaenesthes hewitsoni Aurivillius, 1899; Lycaenesthes grosei Aurivillius, 1899; Anthene sanguinea Bethune-Baker, 1910; Lycaenesthes lunulata aquilonis Hulstaert, 1924; Lycaenesthes lunulata ab. magna Hulstaert, 1924

= Anthene lunulata =

Species of butterfly

Anthene lunulata, the lunulated hairtail and red-spot ciliate blue, is a butterfly in the family Lycaenidae. It is found in Senegal, Gambia, Mali, Burkina Faso, Guinea, Sierra Leone, Liberia, Ivory Coast, Ghana, Togo, Benin, Nigeria, Cameroon, Sudan, the Democratic Republic of the Congo (Uele, Ituri, Equateur, Sankuru, Lualaba and Shaba), Angola, Zambia, Kenya, Zimbabwe, Mozambique and north-eastern Botswana. The habitat consists of savanna and forests.

Adults of both sexes are attracted to flowers, including those of Tridax species. Adult males mud-puddle. Adults have been recorded on wing from October to May and in August.

The larvae feed on the young shoots and the outer cortex of the young leaves of Combretum, Acacia, Albizia and Berlinia species, as well as Brachystegia boehmii, Brachystegia spiciformis, Entada abyssinica, Isoberlinea angolensis, Julbernardia globiflora and Parkia filicoides. They are associated with ants of the genus Pheidole, as well as Camponotus acvapimensis and Technomyrmes detorquens.

Torben Larsen developed a species numbering system for his 2005 publication Butterflies of West Africa. The species is #517. The 'Larsen' numbers have since been used with permission in A Sharp Eye on Butterflies of Ghana.
