= Julbernardia paniculata =

Scientific classification
- Kingdom: Plantae
- Clade: Tracheophytes
- Clade: Angiosperms
- Clade: Eudicots
- Clade: Rosids
- Order: Fabales
- Family: Fabaceae
- Genus: Julbernardia
- Species: J. paniculata

Binomial name
- Julbernardia paniculata (Benth.) Troupin

Species of legume

Julbernardia paniculata is a medium to large tropical tree, also known as muchesa. It is widespread over the warmer parts of south tropical Africa, preferring moderately high altitudes, typically 1,000 to 1,200 metres (3,300 to 3,900 ft). It is very common over its range and is the dominant woodland tree in Miombo woodland over much of central Zambia and northern Malawi.

== Distribution ==
The muchesa is restricted in its range by availability of reliably wet conditions in the growing season of November to March. The rest of the year's rainfall is less important although it should be much drier as it requires at least a short dry resting period so its northern limits are determined by sufficient contrast between these two seasons. It does not occur south of the Zambezi river as it cannot withstand any frost or months with average temperatures of 15 °C (59 °F) or below. As a result, it grows in a band across the continent from north and north-east Angola through Katanga in Democratic Republic of the Congo and across the northern two-thirds of Zambia towards the inland plateau of north Mozambique and as far north as central Tanzania.

== Appearance ==
Unlike its close relatives the msasa and mnondo the muchesa does not become bare during the dry season and only loses its leaves in the run-up to its spring flush of new leaves between mid-August and early September. As a result, it makes much less of a brilliant show of colour than other miombo woodland trees. The new leaves are, however, a very attractive red colour.

The tree itself grows a well-proportioned shape and fine specimens are common, usually reaching heights of 20–23 metres (66–75 ft) in its favoured localities such as plateau woodland. The tree is recognisable by its grey bark, which flakes off in chunks leaving a rough surface and a rusty-brown inner bark exposed. The leaves contain two leaflets, with the end two being bigger than the first two so the leaf hangs slightly on still days. The flowers are insignificant themselves, as with other Julbernardia species, but are noticeable as velvety-brown sprays among the foliage. The dehiscent pods appear in September and split open to scatter the seeds when mature.

== Uses ==
The bark is used to extract tannin for tanning leather, while the leaves are highly prized for feeding to cattle due to their high nutritional content. They are also the source of favourite local delicacy - some kinds of fat caterpillars that feed on the leaves and are collected and roasted as a snack.

Perhaps the greatest value attached to the tree is its use as a source of nectar. The small blossoms may appear on the tree from late March (the end of the growing season) until June or even later and contain copious quantities of nectar at a time when few other trees are in bloom so beekeepers rely on it to maintain their production throughout the year.
