= Julbernardia magnistipulata =

Conservation status
- Vulnerable (IUCN 2.3)

Scientific classification
- Kingdom: Plantae
- Clade: Tracheophytes
- Clade: Angiosperms
- Clade: Eudicots
- Clade: Rosids
- Order: Fabales
- Family: Fabaceae
- Genus: Julbernardia
- Species: J. magnistipulata

Binomial name
- Julbernardia magnistipulata (Harms) Troupin.

Species of legume

Julbernardia magnistipulata is a species of plant in the family Fabaceae. It is found in Kenya and Tanzania.

It is native to the Northern Zanzibar–Inhambane coastal forest mosaic of eastern coastal Kenya and Tanzania. In moist undifferentiated forest it grows monodominant stands or mixed stands, and grows up to 30 meters high. It is also found in Zanzibar–Inhambane scrub forest and evergreen bushland, where it is lower-growing.
