= Afropectinariella doratophylla =

Conservation status
- Endangered (IUCN 3.1)

Scientific classification
- Kingdom: Plantae
- Clade: Tracheophytes
- Clade: Angiosperms
- Clade: Monocots
- Order: Asparagales
- Family: Orchidaceae
- Subfamily: Epidendroideae
- Genus: Afropectinariella
- Species: A. doratophylla

Binomial name
- Afropectinariella doratophylla (Summerh.) M.Simo & Stévart

Synonyms
- Angraecum doratophyllum Summerh.; Pectinariella doratophylla (Summerh.) Szlach., Mytnik & Grochocka

Species of orchid

Afropectinariella doratophylla is a species of orchid in the genus Afropectinariella that is endemic to São Tomé and Príncipe. On São Tomé, it can be found from elevations of 850–1,600 m (2,790–5,250 ft), growing with Syzygium guineense or with Bulbophyllum lizae. On Príncipe, it is found in shrubby vegetation at around 300 m (980 ft) elevation. It is threatened by deforestation for agriculture and timber.
