= Afropectinariella gabonensis =

Conservation status
- Least Concern (IUCN 3.1)

Scientific classification
- Kingdom: Plantae
- Clade: Tracheophytes
- Clade: Angiosperms
- Clade: Monocots
- Order: Asparagales
- Family: Orchidaceae
- Subfamily: Epidendroideae
- Genus: Afropectinariella
- Species: A. gabonensis

Binomial name
- Afropectinariella gabonensis Summerh.

Synonyms
- Angraecum gabonense

Species of orchid

Afropectinariella gabonensis is a species of Afropectinariella that can be found in Cameroon, the Democratic Republic of the Congo, Equatorial Guinea and Gabon.

It is usually found in dense lowland forest rich in Caesalpinioideae up to 1,350 m elevation. It can be found growing on fallen tree trunks or large branches of Gilbertiodendron dewevrei and Julbernardia seretii.

It is threatened by deforestation for logging or oil palm plantations.
