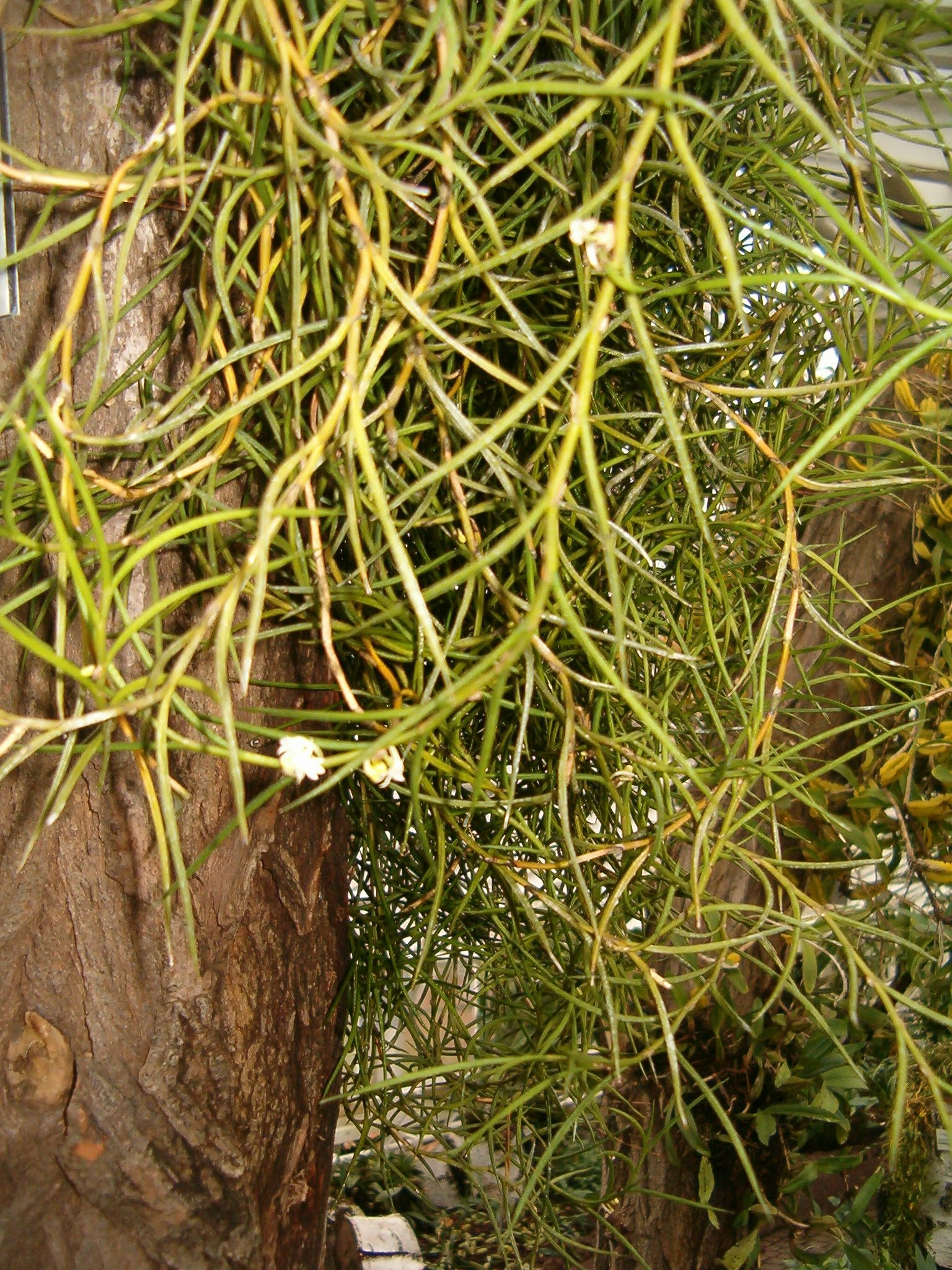

Conservation status
- Vulnerable (IUCN 3.1)

Scientific classification
- Kingdom: Plantae
- Clade: Tracheophytes
- Clade: Angiosperms
- Clade: Monocots
- Order: Asparagales
- Family: Orchidaceae
- Subfamily: Epidendroideae
- Genus: Afropectinariella
- Species: A. pungens

Binomial name
- Afropectinariella pungens Schltr.

Synonyms
- Angraecum pungens

= Afropectinariella pungens =

Species of orchid

Afropectinariella pungens is a species of Afropectinariella that can be found in Cameroon, the Democratic Republic of the Congo, Equatorial Guinea, Gabon and Nigeria. It is found in dense lowland forests, downstream from waterfalls, and on periodically flooded marshes with Oxystigma mannii, between elevations of 50–1,800 m (160–5,910 ft). It also occurs on Terminalia catappa. It is threatened by habitat loss from agriculture and logging.
