= Congolese cuisine =

Food and drink of the Democratic Republic of the Congo

The cuisine of the Democratic Republic of the Congo varies widely, representing the food of indigenous people. Cassava, fufu, rice, plantain and potatoes are generally the staple foods.

== Common Congolese dishes ==
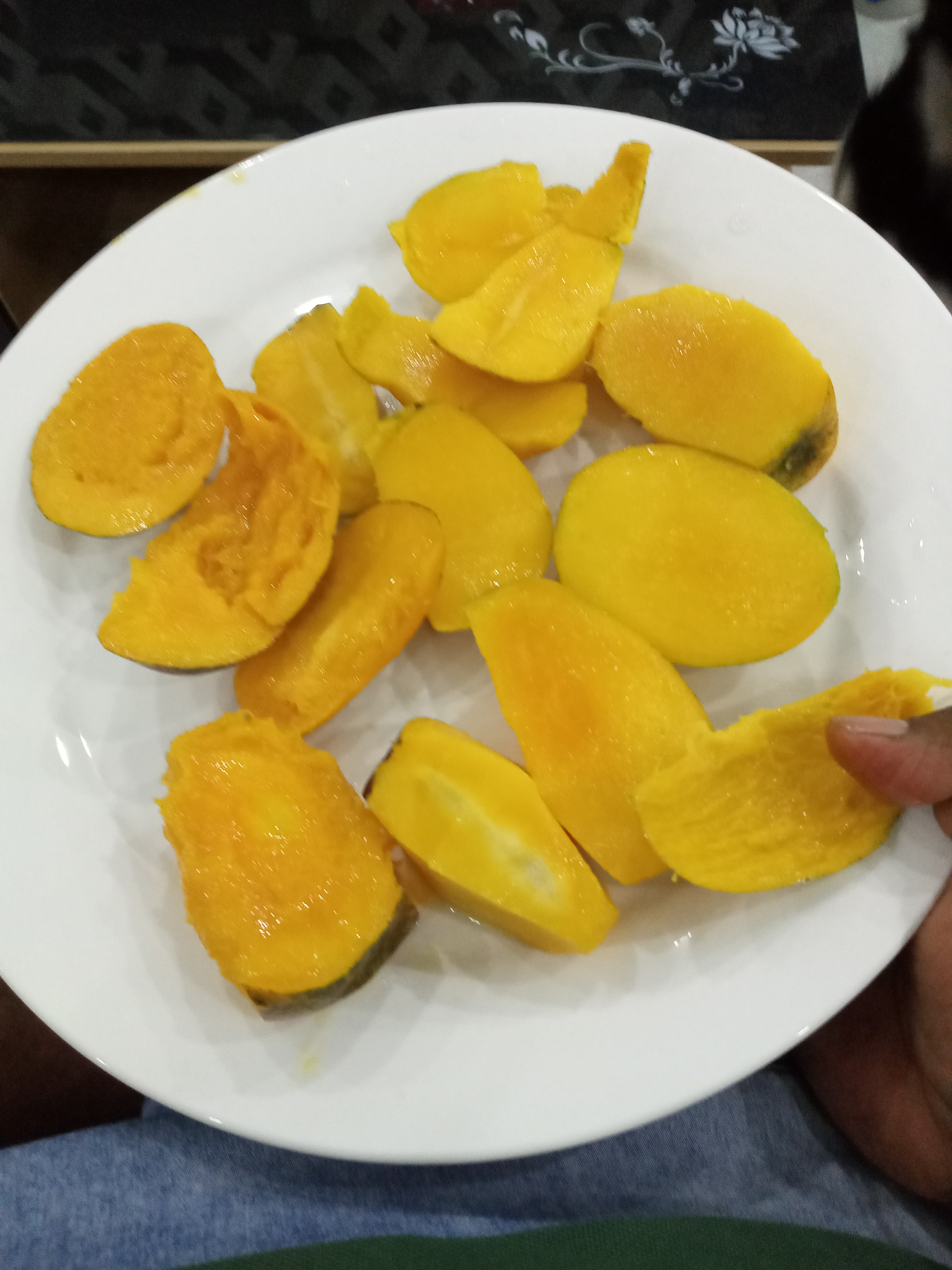
Mangoes, available all year round

Less than two percent of the land is cultivated, and most of this is used for subsistence farming. Congo's farmland is the source of a wide variety of crops. These include maize, rice, cassava (manioc), sweet potatoes, yam, taro, plantain, tomatoes, pumpkin and varieties of peas and nuts. These foods are eaten throughout the country, but there are also regional dishes. The most important crops for export are coffee and palm oil.

Wild plants, fruits, mushrooms, honey and other foods such as bushmeat and fish are also gathered, hunted, and used in dishes. People often sell these crops at markets or by the roadside. Cattle breeding and the development of large-scale agricultural businesses have been hindered by the recent war and the poor quality of the road system.

Congolese meals often consist of a starchy ingredient, along with vegetables and meat in the form of a stew. The starch can come in the form of a paste or mash made of cassava or corn flour, called fufu or ugali. When eaten, the fufu is rolled into golf-ball-sized balls and dipped into the spicy stew; often an indentation is made with the thumb in order to bring up a thimbleful of sauce.

A type of fermented bread, kwanga or chikwangue, made from cassava, is commercially produced throughout the country. Lituma is a popular plantain dish made from mashed plantains, which are formed into balls and baked. Sweet potatoes are prepared similarly and mixed with roasted peanuts in some parts of the country. Rice is often mixed with beans.

To accompany these starchy ingredients, green vegetables such as cassava leaves (pondu), bitterleaf, and okra are often added. Mushrooms, especially prized among the Luba people, are often seen as a substitute for meat in times of shortage. Though total vegetarianism is unknown, most meals are eaten without meat due to its high price.

Fish are plentiful along the Congo River, its tributaries, and various lakes, and are baked, boiled or fried for immediate consumption, or smoked or salted when preserved. Markets often sell ready-to-eat peppered fish baked in banana leaves. Goat is the most widely consumed meat. Mwambe is a common way of cooking chicken with peanut sauce. Edible insects such as grasshoppers and caterpillars are eaten; they tend to have a nutty flavour.

Sauces to mix with the ingredients above can be made with tomatoes, onions, and the local aromatic herbs. Vegetable oil, salt, hot red chile pepper and sweet green pepper are used to impart extra flavour. These spices are less frequently used in the far south.

=== Nganda restaurants ===
Kinshasa's nganda restaurants, with a greater mix of ethnicities, are ethnic restaurants serving food from specific parts of the country, as well as Western imports such as bread and beer. Often owned by unmarried women, the nganda occupy a middle ground between bars and restaurants. Three typical types of nganda restaurants are:

- Riverside nganda serve baked fish served with cooked plantains: recipes from up river.
- Kongo nganda serve fish dishes with a vegetable sauce, together with kwanga mentioned above. These dishes originate downriver from Kinshasa.
- Kasai nganda serve goat meat with rice and green vegetables. They also use rabbit as the grand dessert at a special occasion.

Nganda restaurants are often geared not only to specific regions, but also different classes—from migrant menial workers and miners, to professionals and government officials.

== List of Congolese foods ==
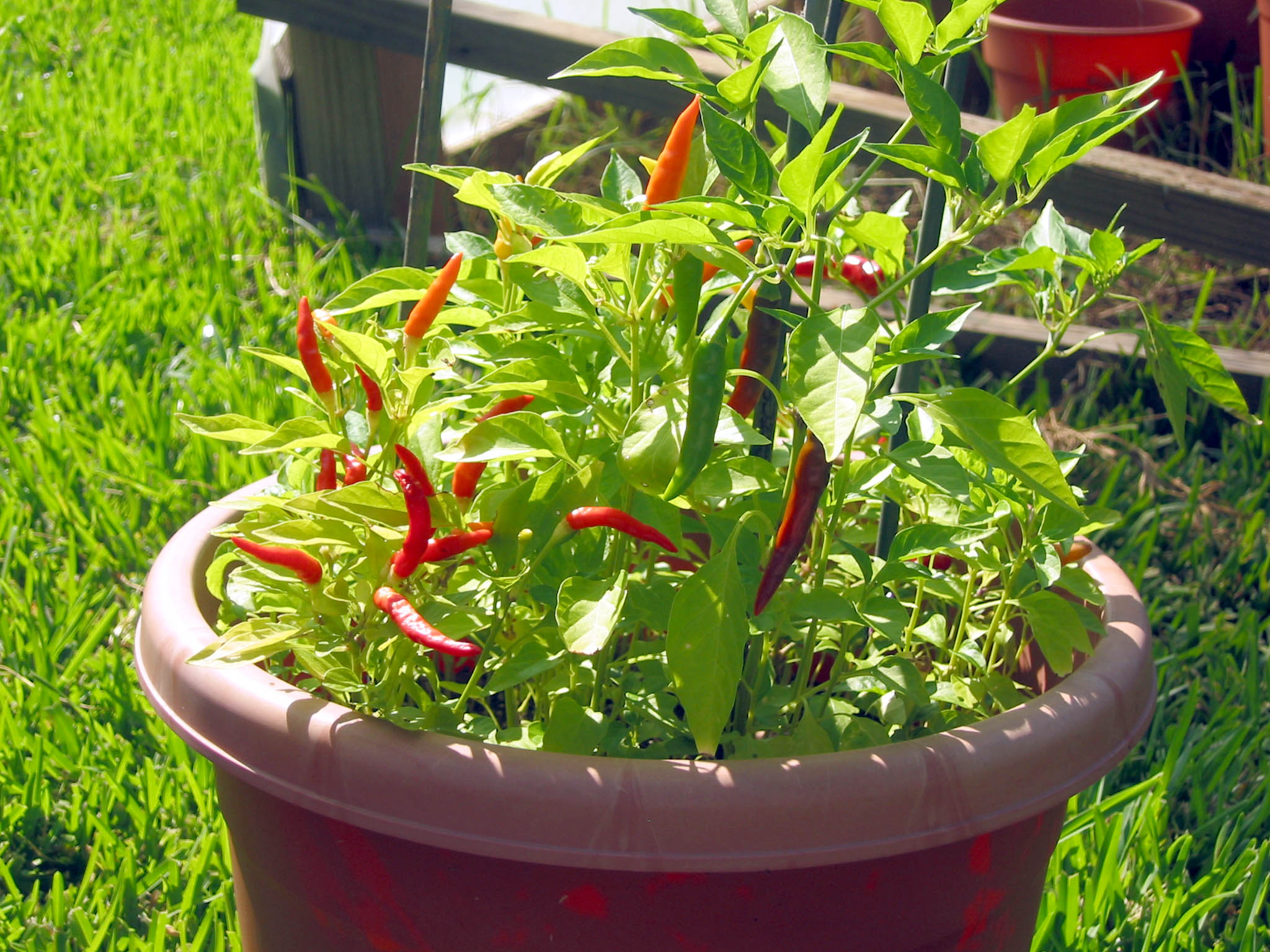
Pili pili peppers (ripe and unripe)

- Moamba, a sauce or a dish prepared with a sauce usually made from peanut butter.
- Ngai ngai ya musaka is a sauce or dish prepared with a sauce usually made from the pericarp (not the seeds) of palm nuts, the fruit of the African oil palm (Elaeis guineensis) tree, in western Middle Africa. Ngai ngai is a leaf called oseille in French and sorrel in English.
- Chikwangue or kwanga, made from cassava, cooked and stored in banana leaves, darker in some parts of the country, nearly white in other parts.
- Fufu, sticky dough-like dish made of cassava flour. This is a staple dish comparable to rice or potatoes in other countries.
- Loso na madesu—rice and beans.
- Sombe or pondu—soup made from boiled, pounded and cooked cassava leaves.
- Ndakala—small dried fish.
- Pili pili—very hot pepper, served with nearly everything, occasionally dried and sprinkled on fruit.
- Palm wine, made from the sap of a wild palm tree, is fermented by natural yeasts, and has an alcohol content of between five and seven percent.
- Mbembe—snails.
- Mulenda, or dongo-dongo—okra.
- Soso—chicken and rice.
- Ntaba or ngulu yako tumba—grilled goat, pork.
- Mbisi ya mayi (poisson de mere)—fish.
- Liboke ya mbika (steamed pumpkin-seed pudding), liboke ya ngulu (pork pepper soup steamed in banana leaves) or liboke ya mbisi (fish, mostly catfish pepper soup steamed in banana leaves).
- Mikate—deep-fried dough balls.
- Makelele—grasshoppers.
- Pain mwambe—peanut butter bread.
- Makayabu—salt fish.
- Kamundele—kebab sticks, beef on skewers.
- Thomson—horse mackerel.
- Mbewngi—black-eyed peas.
- Loso ya bulayi—Congolese fried rice.
- Madesu—bean stew.
- Pondu ya madesu—cassava leaf and bean stew.
- Dabo kolo—small pieces of baked bread.

== See also ==
- African cuisine
- List of African cuisines
