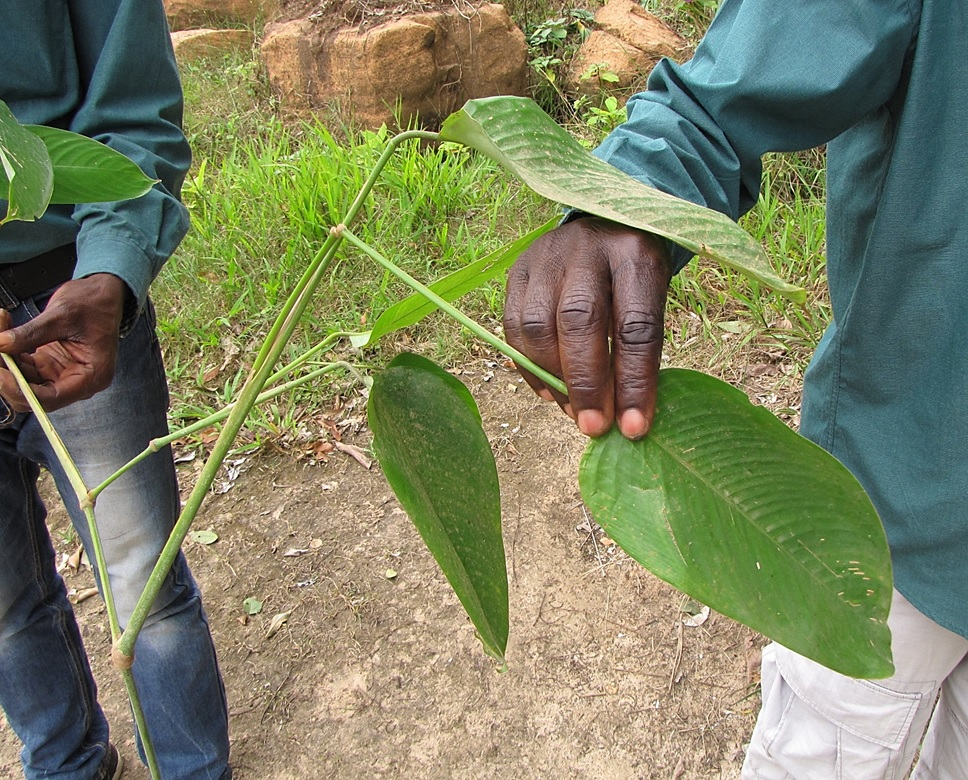
- Megaphrynium macrostachyum

Scientific classification
- Kingdom: Plantae
- Clade: Tracheophytes
- Clade: Angiosperms
- Clade: Monocots
- Clade: Commelinids
- Order: Zingiberales
- Family: Marantaceae
- Genus: Megaphrynium; Milne-Redh.

= Megaphrynium =

Genus of flowering plants

Megaphrynium is a genus of plants native to tropical Africa.

species

- Megaphrynium distans Hepper, Kew Bull. 32: 461 (1968). - Ghana, Côte d'Ivoire, Liberia, Equatorial Guinea
- Megaphrynium gabonense Koechlin, Fl. Gabon 9: 153 (1964). - Gabon, Congo Republic
- Megaphrynium macrostachyum (K.Schum.) Milne-Redh., Kew Bull. 7: 170 (1952). - from Sierra Leone to Uganda
- Megaphrynium trichogynum Koechlin, Fl. Gabon 9: 154 (1964). - Central African Republic, Cameroon, Equatorial Guinea, Gabon, Congo Republic, Zaire
- Megaphrynium velutinum (K.Schum.) Koechlin, Fl. Gabon 9: 158 (1964). - Côte d'Ivoire, Cameroon, Equatorial Guinea, Gabon
