= Angraecum aporoides =

Conservation status
- Least Concern (IUCN 3.1)

Scientific classification
- Kingdom: Plantae
- Clade: Tracheophytes
- Clade: Angiosperms
- Clade: Monocots
- Order: Asparagales
- Family: Orchidaceae
- Subfamily: Epidendroideae
- Genus: Angraecum
- Species: A. aporoides

Binomial name
- Angraecum aporoides Summerh.

Species of orchid

Angraecum aporoides is a species of comet orchid that can be found in Burundi, Cameroon, the Democratic Republic of the Congo, Equatorial Guinea, Gabon, Nigeria, Rwanda and São Tomé and Principe. It can be found in dense lowland forest from elevations of 20–2,400 m on Gilbertiodendron dewevrei trees.
