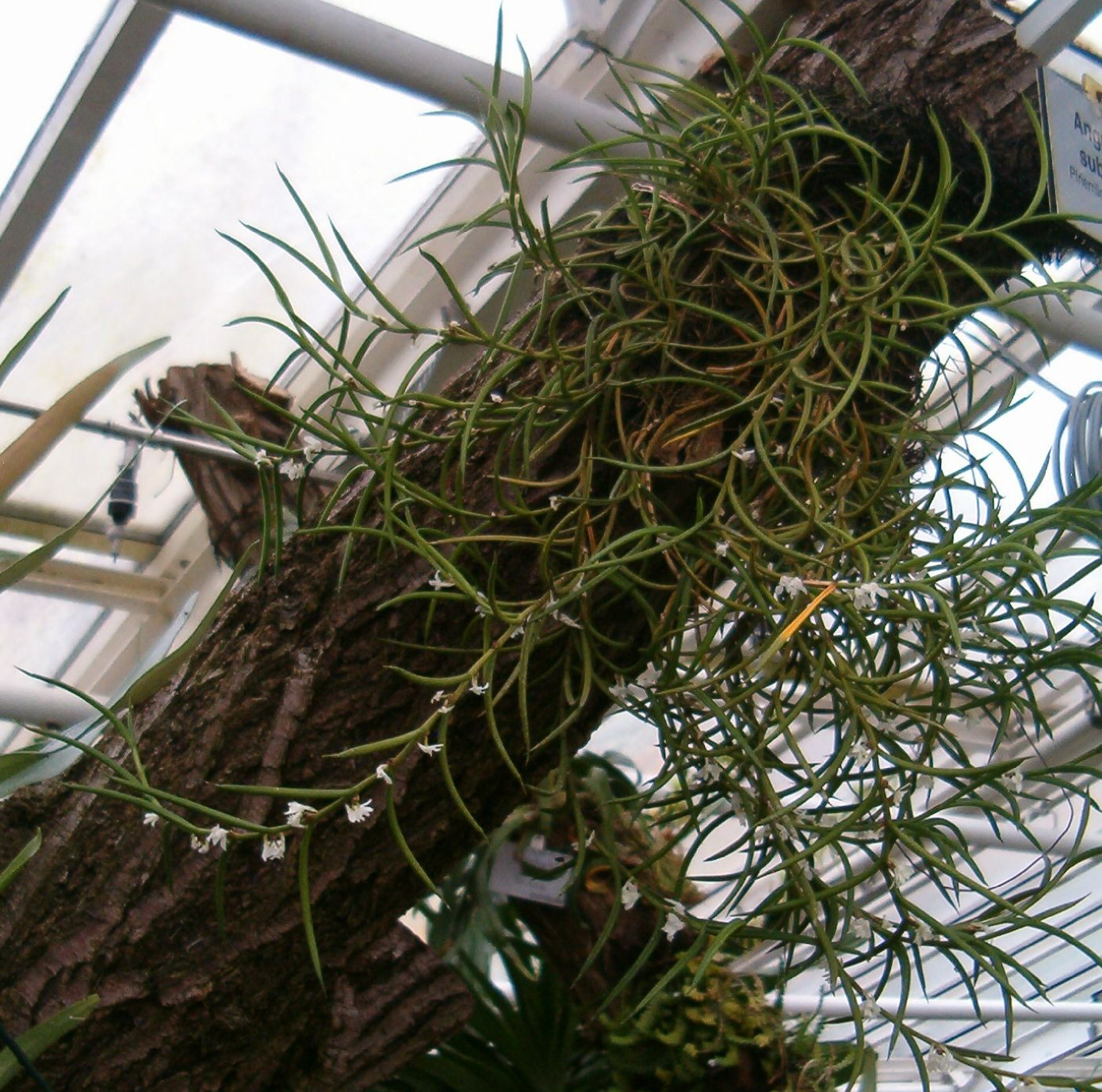

Conservation status
- Least Concern (IUCN 3.1)

Scientific classification
- Kingdom: Plantae
- Clade: Tracheophytes
- Clade: Angiosperms
- Clade: Monocots
- Order: Asparagales
- Family: Orchidaceae
- Subfamily: Epidendroideae
- Genus: Afropectinariella
- Species: A. subulata

Binomial name
- Afropectinariella subulata Lindl.

Synonyms
- Angraecum subulatum

= Afropectinariella subulata =

Species of orchid

Afropectinariella subulata is a species of Afropectinariella that can be found in Cameroon, the Democratic Republic of the Congo, Côte d'Ivoire, Equatorial Guinea, Gabon, Ghana, Guinea, Liberia, Nigeria and Sierra Leone. This species is found in lowland forests, especially those rich in Caesalpinioideae between 50 and 700 m (160 and 2,300 ft) elevation. It occurs in periodically inundated swampy forests with Raphia, Pandanus and Marantaceae, and on calcareous rock in shrubby vegetation. It has been recorded on high shaded branches of Gilbertiodendron dewevrei.
