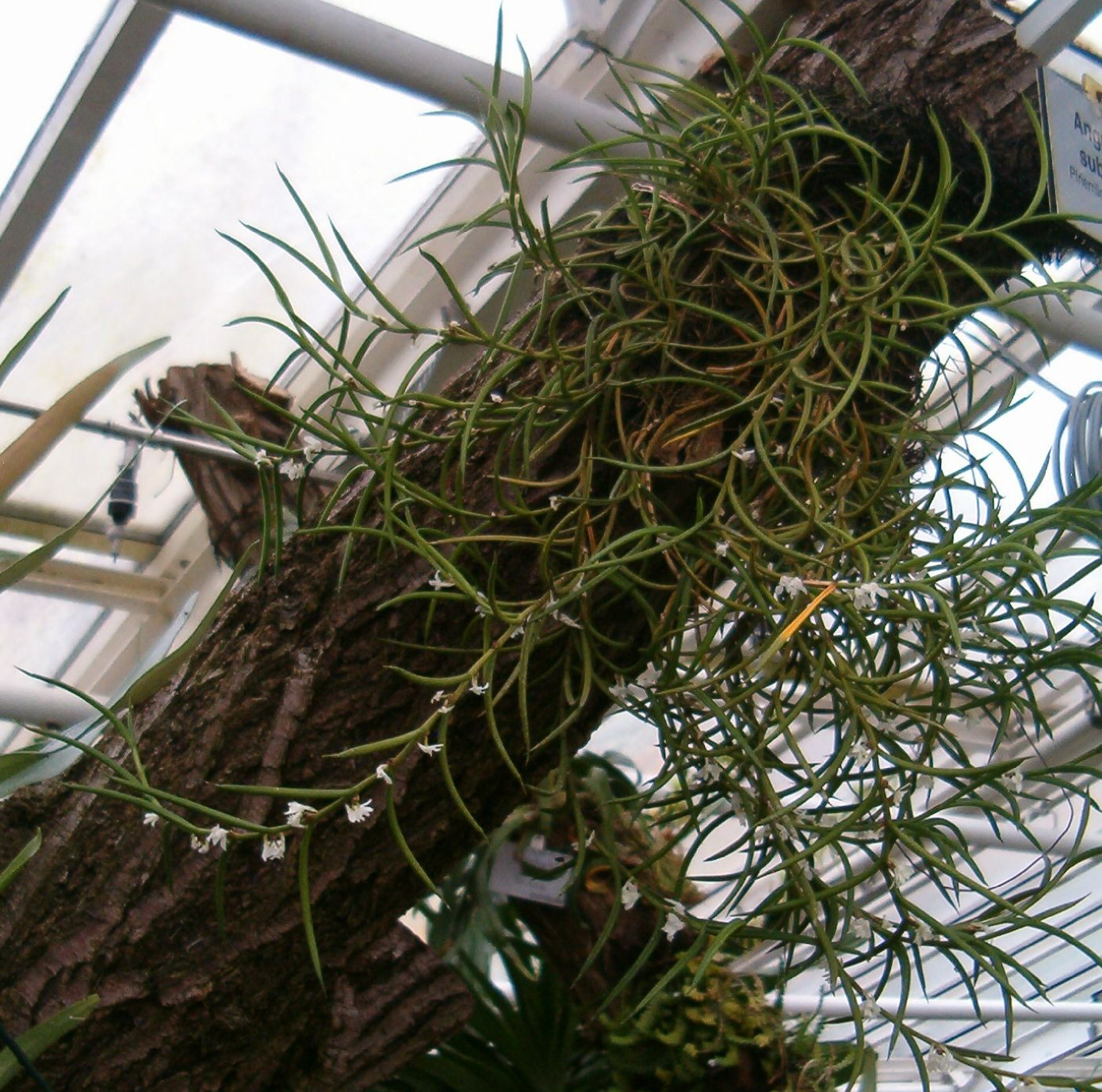
- Afropectinarella subulata

Scientific classification
- Kingdom: Plantae
- Clade: Tracheophytes
- Clade: Angiosperms
- Clade: Monocots
- Order: Asparagales
- Family: Orchidaceae
- Subfamily: Epidendroideae
- Tribe: Vandeae
- Genus: Afropectinariella; M.Simo & Stévart

= Afropectinariella =

Genus of flowering plants

Afropectinariella is a genus of flowering plants belonging to the family Orchidaceae. All four of its current species were moved from the genus Angraecum.

Its native range is Western and Western Central Tropical Africa.

Species:

- Afropectinariella doratophylla (Summerh.) M.Simo & Stévart
- Afropectinariella gabonensis (Summerh.) M.Simo & Stévart
- Afropectinariella pungens (Schltr.) M.Simo & Stévart
- Afropectinariella subulata (Lindl.) M.Simo & Stévart
