= Chikwangue =

African cassava dish

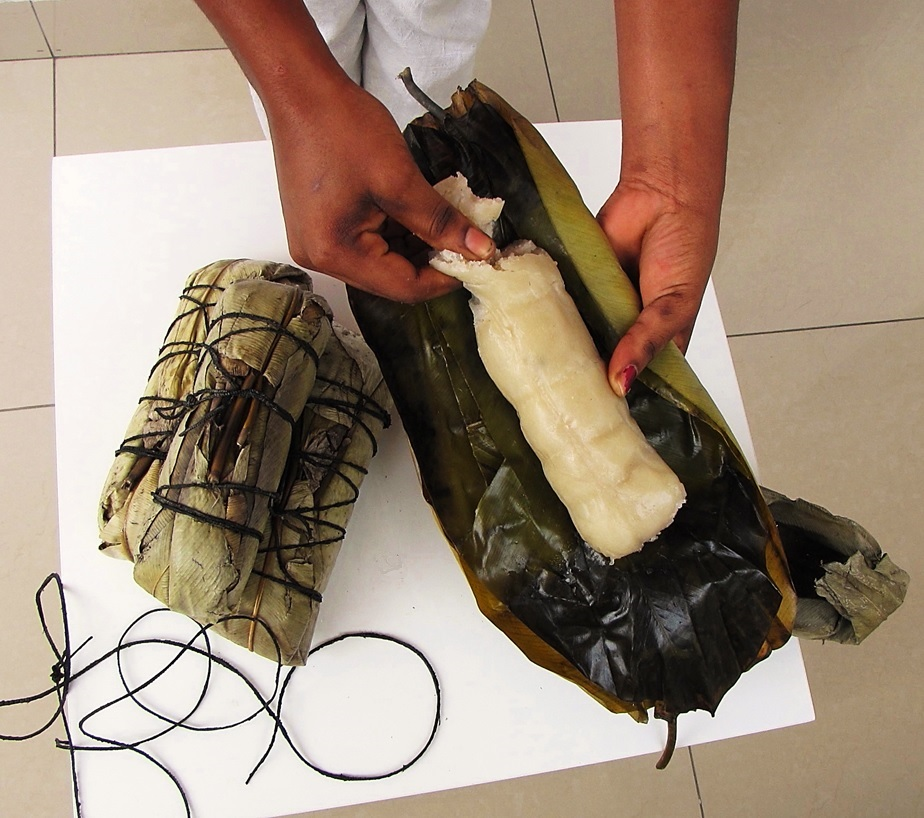
- Alternative names: Kwanga, bobolo
- Type: Dough
- Place of origin: Central Africa
- Main ingredients: cassava
- Similar dishes: fufu

Chikwangue, also known in Cameroon as bobolo and in the Congo River basin language of Lingala as kwanga, is a starchy, fermented-cassava product that is a staple food across Central Africa: the Democratic Republic of Congo (DRC), the Republic of Congo (RotC), Gabon, Cameroon and Equatorial Guinea. Chikwangue is made by fermenting cassava in water for up to fourteen days, then turning it into a paste and wrapping it in marantaceae leaves for steaming.

== Preparation and use ==
The cassava is first peeled, cut into small chunks, and placed in water to ferment (French: roussir). The fermented cassava is then pounded into a paste and par-cooked, before being wrapped in Megaphrynium macrostachyum (a plant of the marantaceae or arrowroot family), or banana leaves and steamed or boiled for up to two hours. The several stages and long processing time are necessary for foods produced from cassava to render them safe to eat. Cassava contains cyanogenic and antinutritional compounds which are dissipated or inactivated by soaking (retting), fermentation and cooking.

Chikwangue may be eaten warm or at room temperature as an accompaniment to other dishes, especially those which are sauce-based. It is served with a variety of traditional dishes of several central African and Congolese cuisines, such as poulet mayonnaise and the vegetable Gnetum africanum (known as okok, fumbua, or m'fumbua).

When not consumed immediately, chikwangue is stored in its leaf wrappings and may be kept for several days without refrigeration for later use. The leaves are not consumed as part of the dish, but discarded.

== Names ==
It is called by a variety of names in local languages:

- agnizock, by the Fang people in Gabon
- bobolo, by the Beti-Pahuin of Cameroon
- in the DRC and RotC, it is called in Lingala: kwanga; or in Kongo: kikwaga
- miondo, by the Duala people in Cameroon (more specifically, a version of bobolo that is wrapped into a thinner tube)
- pita in Gabon

In French it may be called either bâton de manioc 'manioc batons' or pâte de manioc 'manioc paste'—manioc is an alternative name for cassava. An English-language term for the dish is cassava bread.
