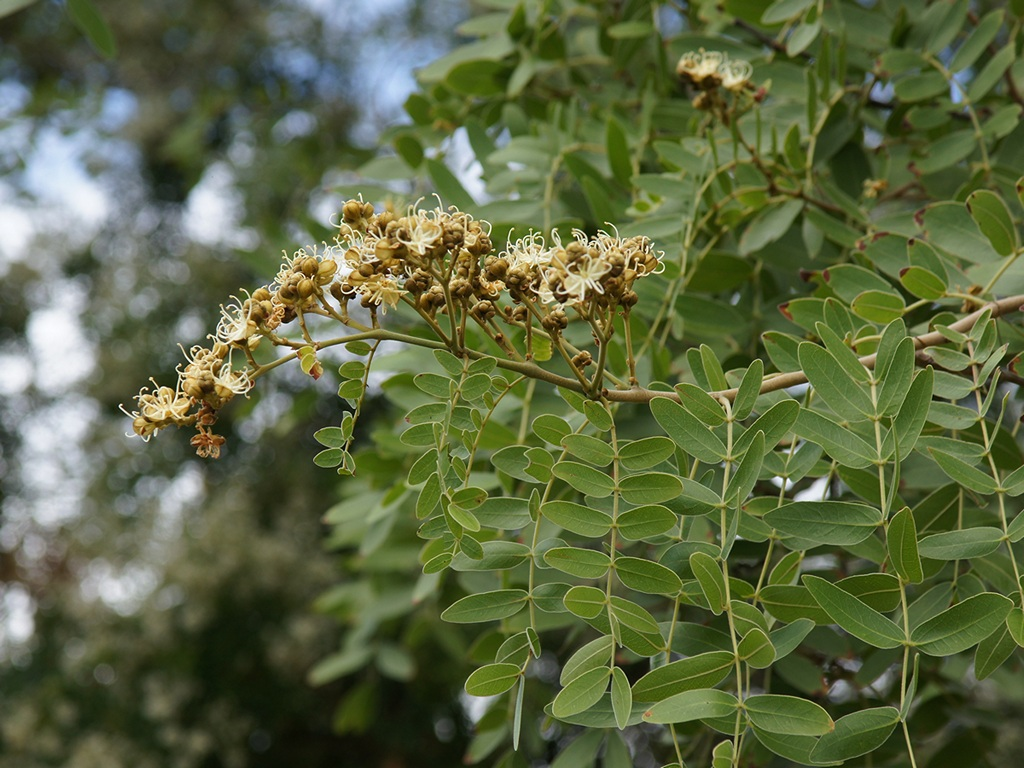
- Julbernardia globiflora, flowers and foliage

Scientific classification
- Kingdom: Plantae
- Clade: Tracheophytes
- Clade: Angiosperms
- Clade: Eudicots
- Clade: Rosids
- Order: Fabales
- Family: Fabaceae
- Subfamily: Detarioideae
- Tribe: Amherstieae
- Genus: Julbernardia; Pellegr. (1943)

Synonyms
- Paraberlinia Pellegr. (1943); Pseudoberlinia P.A.Duvign. (1950); Seretoberlinia P.A.Duvign. (1950); Thylacanthus Tul. (1844)

= Julbernardia =

Genus of legumes

Julbernardia is a genus of plants in the family Fabaceae. It includes ten species native to tropical Africa, ranging from Nigeria to Kenya, Mozambique, Botswana, Zambia and Namibia. They are medium-sized trees.

Species accepted by the Plants of the World Online as of September 2023:

- Julbernardia brieyi (De Wild.) Troupin
- Julbernardia globiflora (Benth.) Troupin
- Julbernardia gossweileri (Baker f.) Torre & Hillc.
- Julbernardia hochreutineri Pellegr.
- Julbernardia letouzeyi Villiers
- Julbernardia magnistipulata (Harms) Troupin
- Julbernardia paniculata (Benth.) Troupin
- Julbernardia pellegriniana Troupin
- Julbernardia seretii (De Wild.) Troupin
- Julbernardia unijugata J.Léonard
