= Guarea thompsonii =

Conservation status
- Vulnerable (IUCN 2.3)

Scientific classification
- Kingdom: Plantae
- Clade: Tracheophytes
- Clade: Angiosperms
- Clade: Eudicots
- Clade: Rosids
- Order: Sapindales
- Family: Meliaceae
- Genus: Guarea
- Species: G. thompsonii

Binomial name
- Guarea thompsonii Sprague & Hutch.

Species of flowering plant

Guarea thompsonii, also called black guarea or dark bossé, is a species of plant in the family Meliaceae. It is found in Cameroon, the Republic of the Congo, the Democratic Republic of the Congo, Ivory Coast, Gabon, Ghana, Liberia, and Nigeria. It is threatened by habitat loss.
