= Monodominance =

Condition where more than 60% of the tree canopy are a single species of tree

Monodominance is an ecological condition in which more than 60% of the tree canopy comprises a single species of tree. Monodominant forests are quite common under conditions of extra-tropical climate types. Although monodominance is studied across different regions, most research focuses on the many prominent species in tropical forests. Connel and Lowman, originally called it single-dominance. Conventional explanations of biodiversity in tropical forests in the decades prior to Connel and Lowman's work either ignored monodominance entirely or predicted that it would not exist.

Connel and Lowman hypothesized two contrasting mechanisms by which dominance can be attained. The first is by fast regrowth in unstable habitats with high disturbance rates. The second is through competitive exclusion in stable habitats that have low disturbance rates. Explanations of persistent monodominace include the monodominant species being more resistant than others to seasonal flooding, or that the monodominance is simply a sere. With persistent monodominance, the monodominant species successfully remains so from generation to generation.

== Examples ==
Examples of monodominant forests under temperate climate conditions include widespread boreal coniferous forests of the northern hemisphere, temperate Fagus grandifolia (American beech) forests in southern New England, Tsuga canadensis (Eastern hemlock) forests in northeastern United States, Populus tremuloides (quaking aspen) forests in mountainous regions of the western United States, Fagus sylvatica (European beech) forests in central Europe, Fagus crenata (Japanese beech) forests in Japan, or high-altitude monodominant Nothofagus menziesii (silver beech) and Nothofagus solandri (mountain beech) forests in New Zealand.

In tropical lowland forest environments, a minimum of 22 species from eight different families are known to create monodominant forests. Examples of persistent monodominance are seen in Africa, Central and South America, and Asia. Dipterocarpaceae is one example of a plant family that is recognized as persistently dominant in Asia. The ectomycorrhizal tree Dicymbe corymbosa, found in central Guyana, creates wide ranges of monodominant forests containing more than 80% of the canopy tree species.

Dominant plants in the Neotropics and Africa are usually in the family Leguminosae. The species Gilbertiodendron dewevrei, Cynometra alexandri, and Julbernardia seretii are pronounced as exclusive dominants in their individual forests in equatorial Africa. G. dewevrei dominated forests are more widespread on the highlands adjacent to the central basin of the Zaire River. This species in the Ituri forest forms monodominant stands that occupy more than 90% of the canopy trees.

Monodominance often occurs also on oceanic islands in the tropics. Examples are Ochrosia oppositifolia forests on the Marshall Islands, Barringtonia asiatica forests on the Samoan Islands, Pisonia grandis forests on Rose Atoll, Palaquium hornei forests on Fiji Islands, Leucaena leucocephala forests on Nuka Hiva and Ua Pou of the Marquesas Islands and on Vanuatu, and Metrosideros polymorpha forests on the Hawaiian Islands.

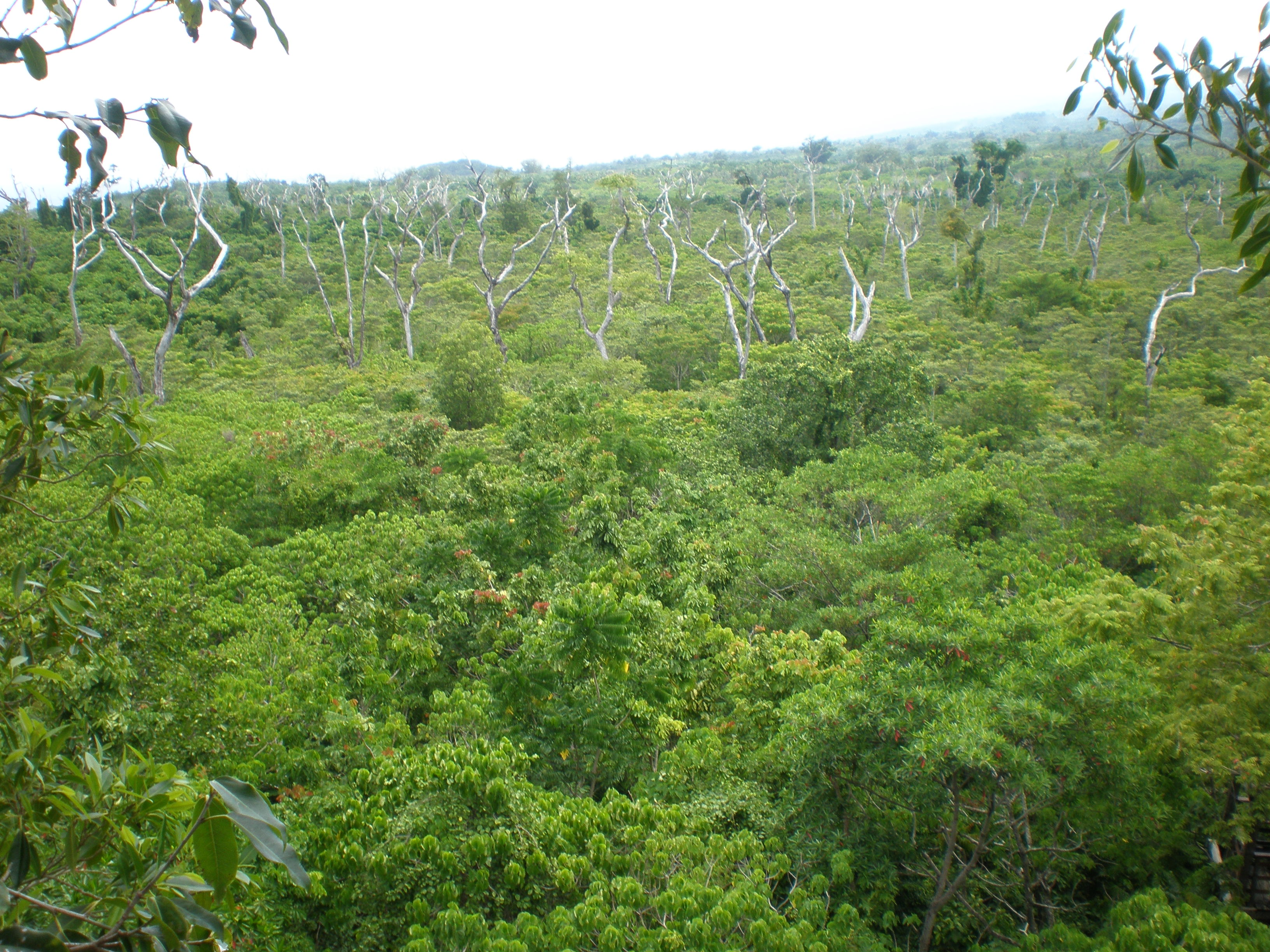
View from the top, Falealupo Rainforest canopy walkway, Savaii, Samoa 2009

== Causes ==
Connel and Lowman originally hypothesized ectomycorrhizal association causing the replacement of other species as one of two mechanisms by which a species becomes persistently monodominant; the other is the simple colonization of large gaps. However, subsequent research over the years has shown that there is not a single, simple mechanism by which monodominance occurs. Monodominant species have been recorded forming at various times after forest clearance, though this has not been shown to be a predictor of monodominant species persistence. Reliance upon ectomycorrhizae and poor soils have not been demonstrated. Instead, multiple traits of adult monodominant species hinder the ability of other species to grow, including a dense canopy, a uniform canopy, deep leaf litter, slow nutrient processing, mast fruiting, and poor dispersal.

Several causal mechanisms have been proposed for the formation of monodominant forest in tropical ecosystems, including features of the environment such as low disturbance rates, and intrinsic characteristics of the dominant species: escape from herbivores, high seedling shade-tolerance, and the formation of mycorrhizal networks between individuals of the same species.

=== Canopy ===
The dense canopy of the adult trees prevents light from getting into the understory. In the Ituri Forest of the Democratic Republic of the Congo a monodominant Gilbertiodendron forest understory only receives 0.57% full sunlight while a mixed-forest understory receives 1.15% full sunlight. This difference may prohibit many plant species from living in that environment due to the low light conditions and their resulting inability to sufficiently and effectively photosynthesize. Even some species that are more shade tolerant cannot survive the severe low light conditions.

=== Leaf-litter ===
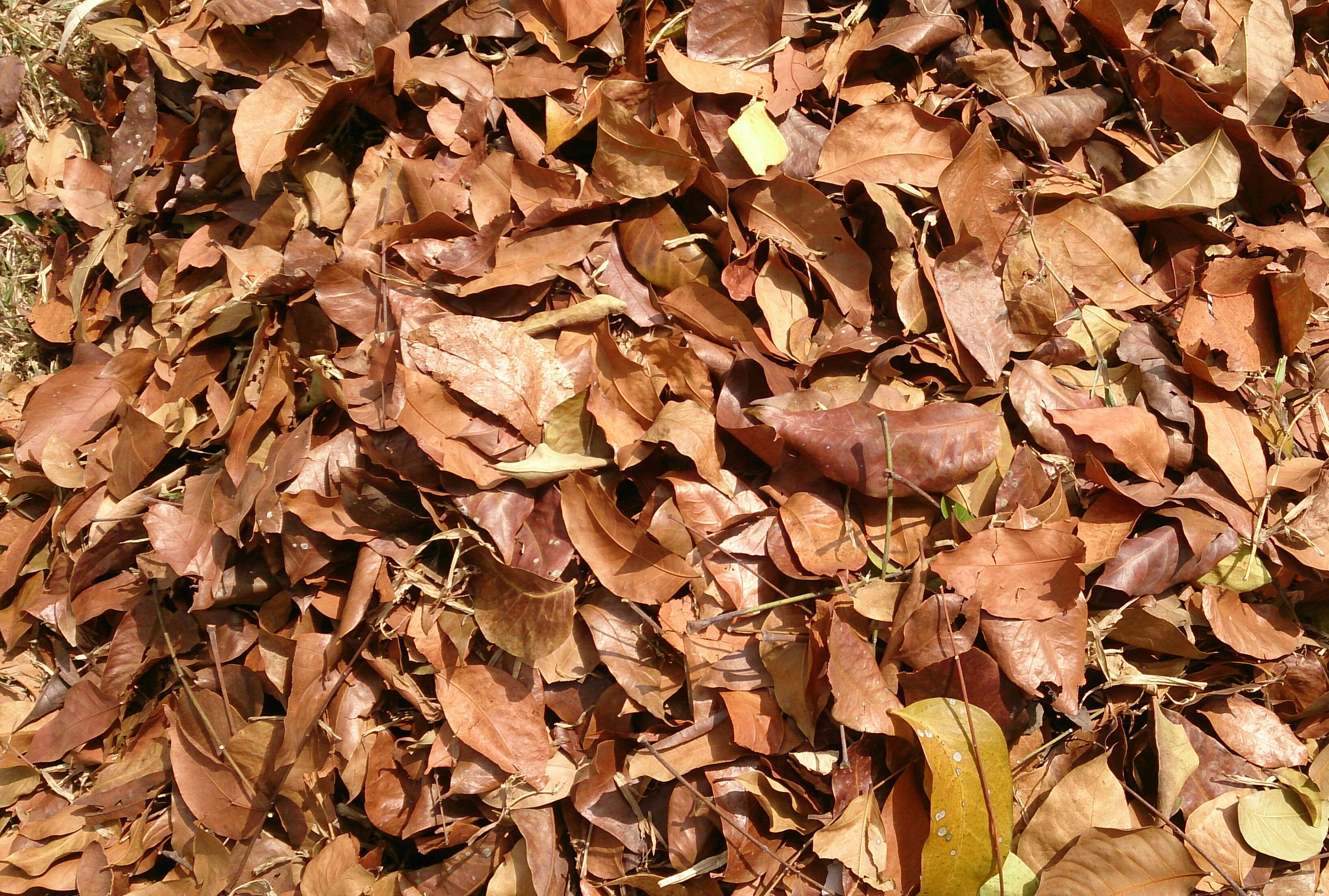
Leaf litter

A monodominant forest has generally very deep leaf litter because the leaves are not decomposing as quickly as in other forests. In some monodominant forests the decomposition rates can be two to three times slower than mixed forests. Low ammonium and nitrate could be the result of this slow decomposition which in turn, means less nutrients in the soil for other plant species to use.

=== Nutrient processing ===
Nutrient processing is somewhat different from one forest to another. In the Gilbertiodendron forests there is low availability of nitrogen due to the low levels in the leaves that fall to the ground and the slow decomposition. This could prevent other plant species from colonizing because the soil lacks necessary nutrients. In Parashorea chinensis forests, trees are known to require more fertile soils than in other areas. There is a large amount of manganese though that prevents other plants from taking root. Manganese can poison other trees if the levels are too high and possibly cause leaf chlorosis and necrosis and prevent the nutrient uptake of calcium and magnesium.

=== Mast fruiting ===
Mast fruiting is a mass fruiting event that overwhelms the animals that consume fruit and helps the seeds' survival rate. Well-defended leaves also assist in the prevention of predation. In the Gilbertiodendron forests this mast fruiting does not assist in lesser predation, but in Asia and the Neotropics this does induce fitness benefits and sometimes is actually important to monodominant maintenance.

=== Poor dispersal ===
A monodominant forest has poor dispersal because of the lack of animal dispersers, so many of the seeds are just dropped from the parent tree and fall to the ground where they germinate. This can create a regular and radial path around the parent tree that results in a "tree-by-tree replacement" in a mixed forest. In a monodominant forest the dominant species do not need all of the described traits to overwhelm the area. Though many have a combination, all monodominant forests have at least one of these traits to create the monodominant habitat.

=== Ectomycorrhizal association ===
Many of the tropical monodominant trees are associated with ectomycorrhizal (ECM) fungi networks. Mycorrhizal fungi are known to effect plant diversity trends in a variety of ecosystems around the world. Ectomycorrhizal relations with trees can increase nutrient supplies through a more effectual use of larger capacities of soils or through the direct decomposition of leaf litter. This has been suggested to provide a competitive advantage to such tree species.

Examples of ectomycorrhizal trees in tropical rainforests can be found in Asia, Africa, and the Neotropics. There is a strong correlation between the ECM association in tropical trees and the occurrence of monodominance.

Fungi like mycorrihizae appear not to harm the leaves and even display a symbiotic relationship. ECM fungi are derived from saprotrophs and retain some ability to decompose organic material. Because tropical soils are often nutrient-poor, ECM trees are predicted to have a competitive advantage over neighboring trees because of their ability to attain more nutrients. With time this could lead to dominance in a tropical rainforest.

==== Ectomycorrhizal mediated mechanisms ====
A study of Dicymbe corymbosa individuals show that (in terms of total basal area) the adult trees dominate resources and space. Additionally, they form coppices, also known as epicormic shoots, which allow their perseverance over time. Hence, if one stem of the tree dies, it is replaced by another living stem in the canopy. This creates same-species regrowth at stem level. All of this requires high levels of carbohydrates and nutrients that are accumulated from the ECM association. There is evidence that masting tree species rely on ECM associations to accumulate these requisite nutrients for reproduction during inter-mast years. Associations between resource levels stowed in plant tissue, timing of masting, and ECM patterns propose that ECM fungi are essential in the procurement of nutrients required for large masting trees.

Seeds of monodominant trees typically have higher rates of germination and seedling survival when planted in monodominant forests rather than mixed forests. Monodominant seedlings planted in mixed forests have significantly lower levels of ECM colonization of roots. The lower percent of ECM colonization can cause the low survival rates of these seedlings in mixed forest. Another mechanism that can be important for seedling and growth survival is a connection to a common ECM network. By connecting their small root systems to ECM networks that emanate from larger adults, more benefits can be received.

Slower decomposition rates in monodominant forests have been hypothesized to be a result of competition between saprotrophic bacteria and fungi. ECM fungi may be suppressing saprotrophs in the monodominant forest to slow decomposition and return organically bound nutrients back to the tree. This is also called the "Gadgil" hypothesis.

== Ecological impacts ==
All of the traits that contribute to creating a monodominant forest over time hinder the growth of other plant species and force them to move to a more mixed forest. Even though this is inconvenient for the plant species that were there, there has not been any evidence that suggests that this is a negative effect of monodominance. Monodominant forests are also found to have significantly less nitrogen in their soil than mixed forests. In these monodominant forests there are a lot of dominant tree species from the legume family that have nitrogen fixation. Nitrogen fixation creates compounds that help a plant to grow in otherwise low nutrient conditions.
