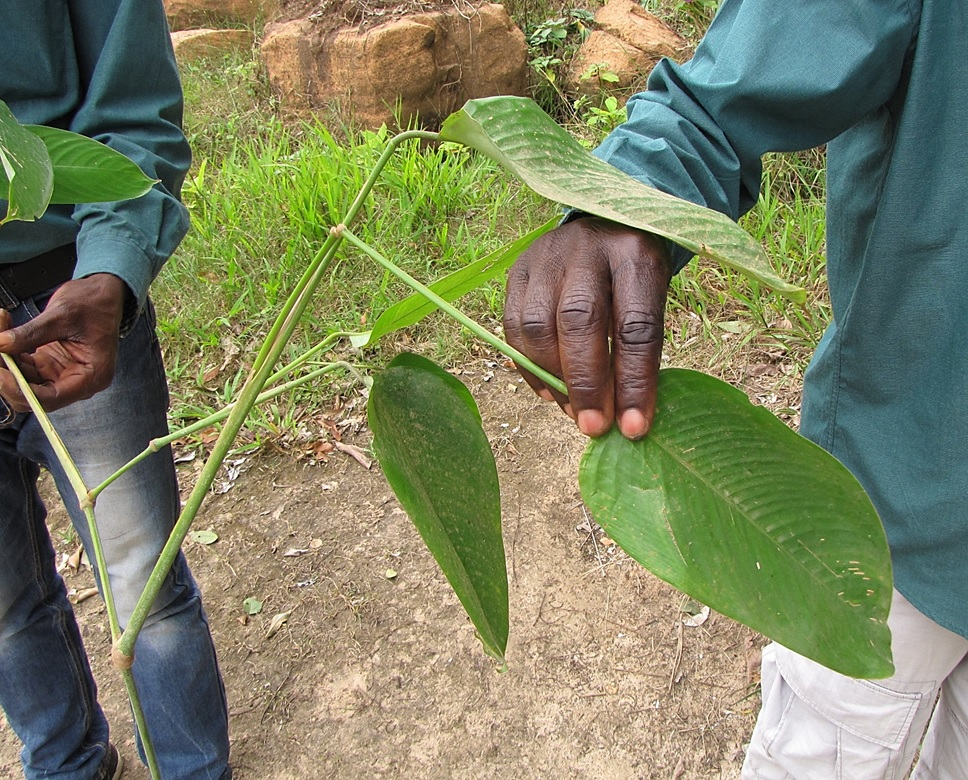

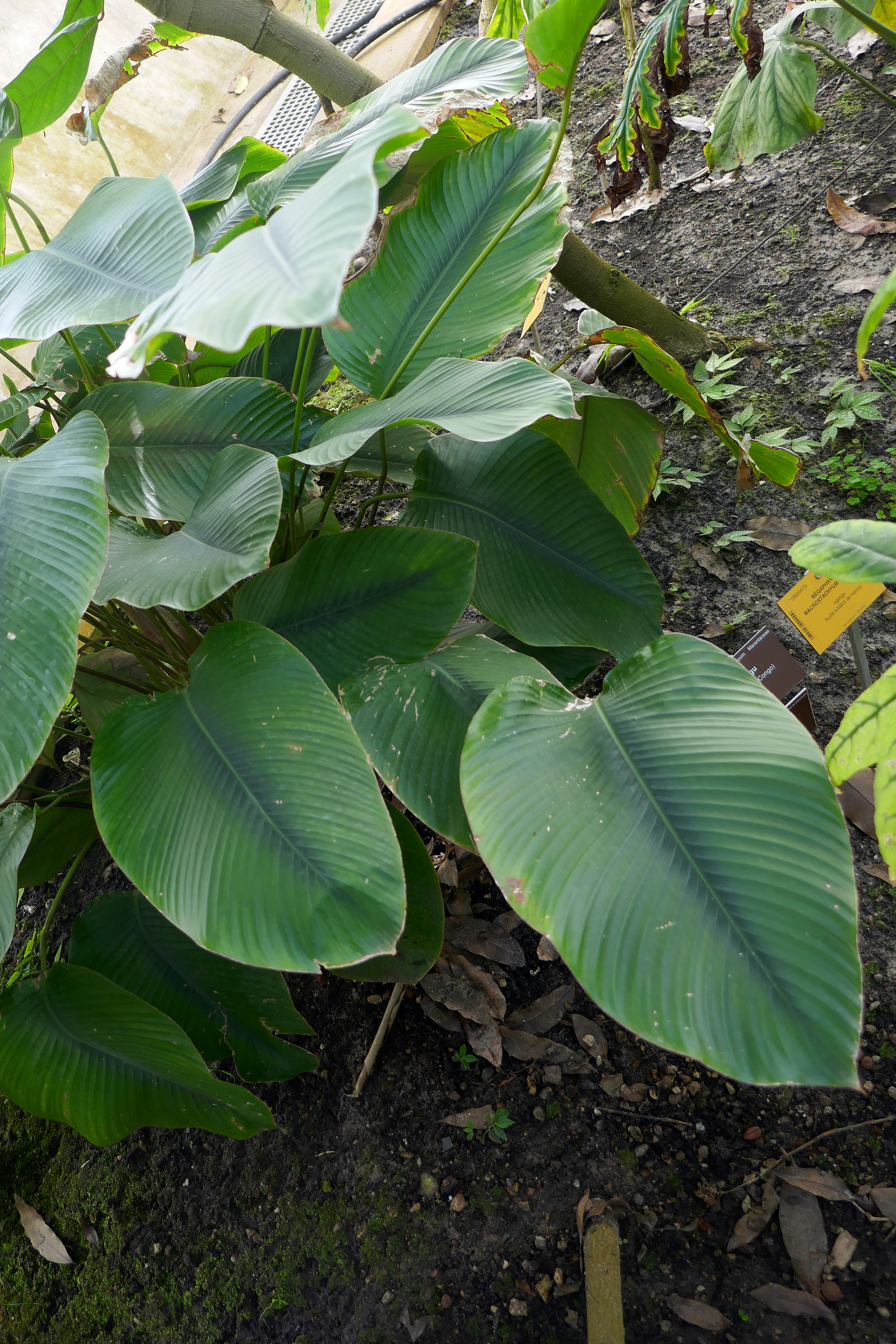

Scientific classification
- Kingdom: Plantae
- Clade: Tracheophytes
- Clade: Angiosperms
- Clade: Monocots
- Clade: Commelinids
- Order: Zingiberales
- Family: Marantaceae
- Genus: Megaphrynium
- Species: M. macrostachyum

Binomial name
- Megaphrynium macrostachyum (K.Schum.) Milne-Redh

Synonyms
- Phyllodes macrostachya K.Schum., Bot. Jahrb. Syst. 15: 445 (1892).; Sarcophrynium macrostachyum (K.Schum.) K.Schum. in H.G.A.Engler (ed.), Das Pflanzenreich, IV, 48: 37 (1902).

= Megaphrynium macrostachyum =

Species of flowering plant

Megaphrynium macrostachyum is a species of large plant in the Marantaceae family native to tropical Africa. It grows in moist places and regenerates rapidly after ground disturbance or fire. The long stems have various uses in making cord, baskets and mats, and the large leaves are used for wrapping food, for making utensils and containers, and in herbal medicine.

== Description ==
Megaphrynium macrostachyum is a rhizomatous perennial plant up to 4 m (13 ft) tall. Each stem bears a single leaf and an inflorescence, the remaining leaves arising directly from the rhizome which can be 6 m (20 ft) long. These leaves are borne on petioles up to 5 m (16 ft) long which sheath the stem at its base and have calloused portions just below the blade. Each leaf blade is ovate/elliptical, up to 60 cm × 30 cm (24 in × 12 in), with a rounded base and acute apex. The inflorescence forms a spike just below the calloused portion of the petiole, with branches formed of zig-zag nodes. The small flowers are bisexual and subtended by bracts and are white to bluish-purple. They are followed by three-lobed, globular fruits which turn bright red and split open when ripe. The three seeds embedded in white pulp are purplish-black.

== Distribution ==
Megaphrynium macrostachyum is native to tropical, sub-Saharan Africa, its range extending from Liberia to South Sudan and Uganda, and southward to Gabon, the Republic of Congo, and the Democratic Republic of Congo, at altitudes of up to 1,500 m (5,000 ft).

== Ecology ==
Megaphrynium macrostachyum is a large, fast-growing plant. It occurs in wet habitats in both primary and secondary forests, in clearings, in logged areas and on fallow land. It regenerates from the rhizome after wildfires and other disturbances and may form dense, monospecific patches which may reduce the regeneration of trees. The flowers are attractive to bees and the rhizomes are eaten by gorillas, chimpanzees and bonobos.

== Uses ==
The leaves of Megaphrynium macrostachyum are used to wrap food while it is cooking, imparting a characteristic aroma to the food. For example, it is the preferred wrapping for a staple dish of central Africa, chikwangue (cassava bread). The young leaves can be cooked and eaten as a vegetable and older leaves are used to make disposable table-wear, containers, funnels, pots, fans and parasols. The petioles, either whole or split, are used to make cord, baskets and mats. The leaves are also used in herbal medicine as a sedative and to treat epilepsy and mental problems, another use being as an antidote to snake venom and arthropod stings.

== Research ==
Megaphrynium macrostachyum has been used in research into the manufacture of silver nanoparticles by plant extracts. The nanoparticles show antimicrobial activity against E. coli and can "find immense application in the field of biomedical appliances and formulation of antimicrobial agents and in combination with antibiotics". Other research showed that a leaf extract given at low dose rates may positively affect blood producing tissues.
