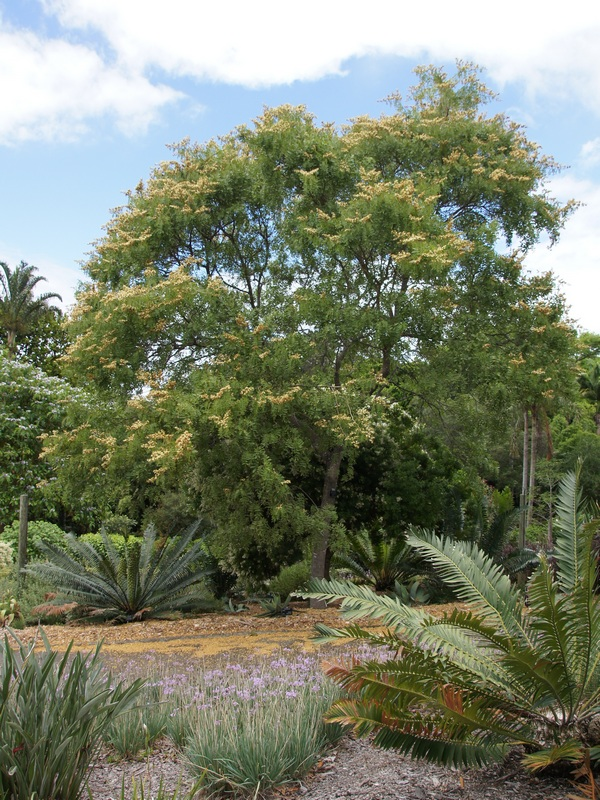
- A flowering Mnondo tree at the Brisbane Botanic Gardens

Scientific classification
- Kingdom: Plantae
- Clade: Tracheophytes
- Clade: Angiosperms
- Clade: Eudicots
- Clade: Rosids
- Order: Fabales
- Family: Fabaceae
- Genus: Julbernardia
- Species: J. globiflora

Binomial name
- Julbernardia globiflora (Benth.) Troupin

Synonyms
- List: Brachystegia globiflora Benth.; Berlinia eminii Taub. ex Engl.; Isoberlinia globiflora (Benth.) Greenway; Isoberlinia globiflora (Benth.) Hutch.; Pseudoberlinia globiflora (Benth.) J. Duvign; Pseudoberlinia globiflora (Benth.) P.A. Duvign; Westia eminii (Taub.) J.F. Macbr.; Berlinia globiflora (Benth.) Harms ex Engl.; Berlinia globiflora (Benth.) Hutch. & BurttDavy

= Julbernardia globiflora =

Mnondo

Species of legume

Julbernardia globiflora is a tropical African tree widespread at moderate altitudes in Miombo woodland to the south and east of the equatorial forest region of the Congo Basin. Its common name is mnondo. It is ecologically important over wide areas and is dominant to co-dominant in many types of woodland, always being most successful in drier types of deciduous woodland where there is less competition.

== Distribution ==
The mnondo occurs away from the coast except at the southern limit of its range. It prefers a hot dry resting season and plenty of rain in the summer growing season. It grows best where there is a definite contrast between day and night temperatures and does best at altitudes of 1,000 metres or more (the inland plateaus of south tropical Africa.) From Tanzania across to Angola it is found in dry types of woodland and is seldom dominant although common in many woodland types. It is the only species of Julbernardia present in Botswana (the northern parts only) and it reaches its southern extent in Mozambique just south of the Save River near the coast at about 22°S, not reaching outside the tropics.

In Zimbabwe it is common in all types of deciduous woodland and is often co-dominant with the msasa and is also locally common in the drier woodland of the south where the msasa does not thrive.

== Ecology ==
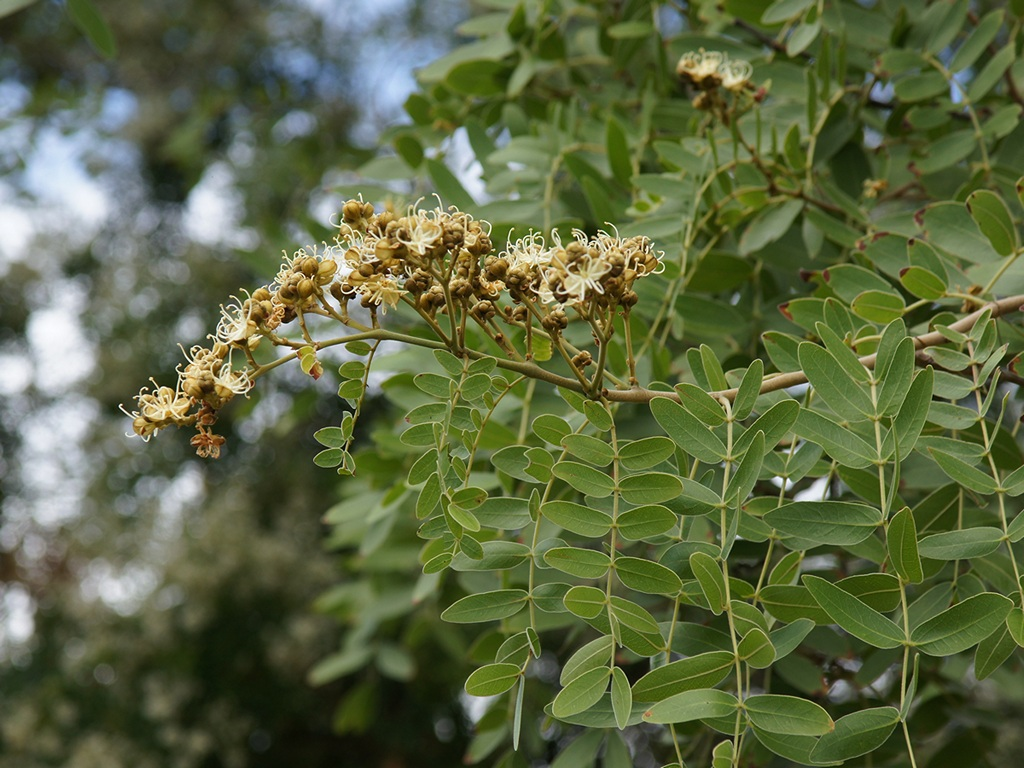
Flowers and foliage

The mnondo is a medium-sized tree, but larger towards the north of its range. In the northern half of its range, it is generally 15–16 meters tall but can grow up to 18 meters. There it is deciduous but may not lose all of its leaves before producing new ones. In the southern half, it is usually smaller (12–13 meters is a large specimen). There it is also deciduous but sometimes stands bare for two months or more. During spring it displays a bright red foliage, and in Zambia, Zimbabwe and Malawi it joins the Msasa's springtime leaf show in late August. It is not as variable in its leaf colours as the msasa and the red colour fades back to green more quickly.

The mnondo closely resembles the msasa in many ways and the two are not easy to tell apart, especially in the southern parts of the mnondo's range where they are much closer in size. The distinguishing feature is that the leaflets on the msasa increase in size towards the end of the leaf, making them hang downwards, while those of the mnondo are biggest in the middle so they do not hang in the same way. Secondly, the mnondo blooms later than the msasa, in mid-summer (around January). Although the flowers are just as insignificant as those of the msasa, the mnondo pods are concentrated at the top and sides of the tree and are readily visible in late summer, unlike the msasa's that are among the leaves. The mnondo also has a less impressive shape and lighter branches so it is less attractive in appearance.
