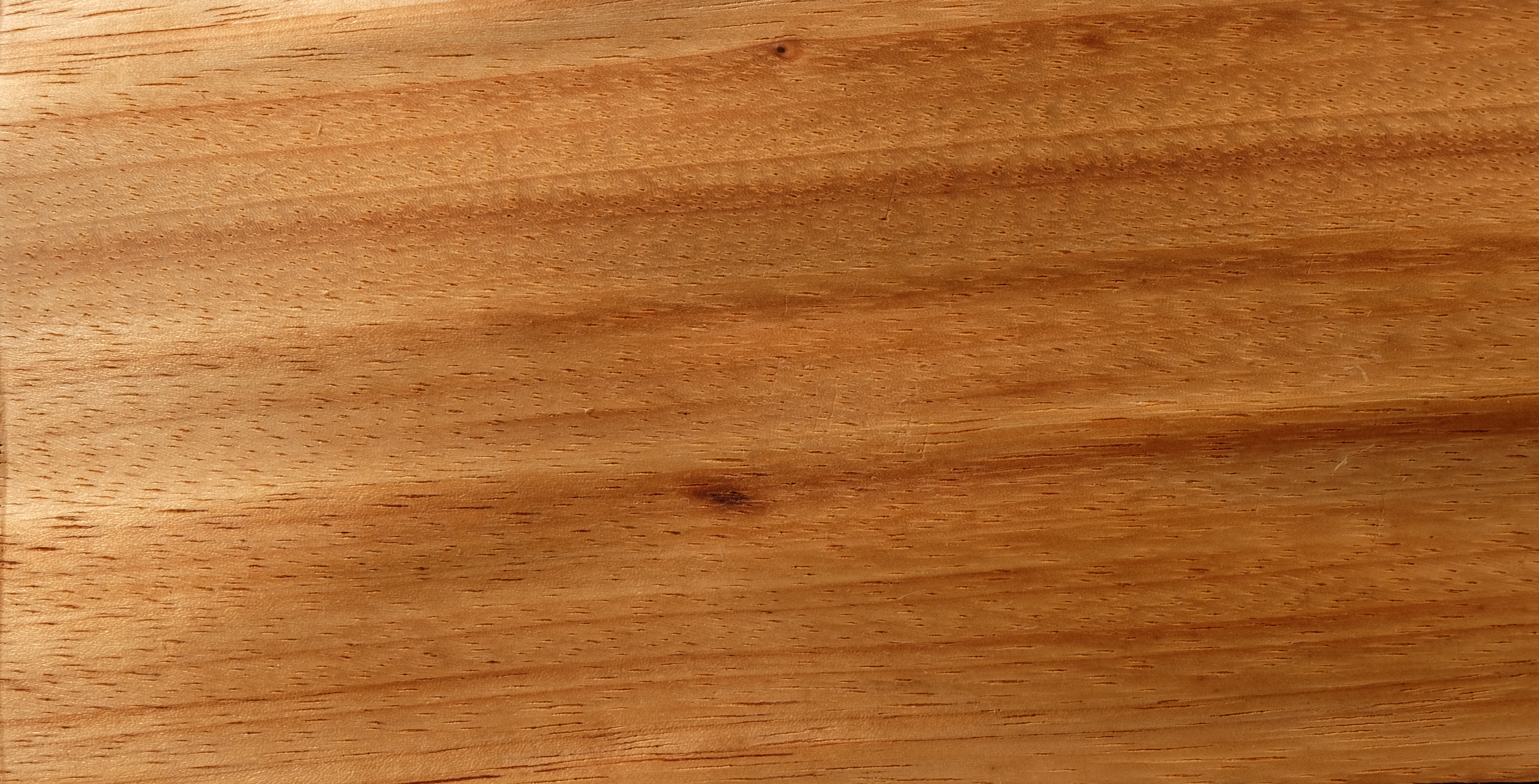
- Sliced veneer of bomanga

Conservation status
- Least Concern (IUCN 3.1)

Scientific classification
- Kingdom: Plantae
- Clade: Tracheophytes
- Clade: Angiosperms
- Clade: Eudicots
- Clade: Rosids
- Order: Fabales
- Family: Fabaceae
- Genus: Brachystegia
- Species: B. laurentii

Binomial name
- Brachystegia laurentii (De Wild.) Louis ex J.Léonard (1952)

Synonyms
- Macrolobium laurentii De Wild. (1905); Brachystegia zenkeri Harms (1910)

= Brachystegia laurentii =

Species of legume

Brachystegia laurentii, a plant in the family Fabaceae, is a species of large tree found in western Cameroon, Gabon, Equatorial Guinea, the Democratic Republic of the Congo and the Republic of the Congo. It has a dense, umbrella-shaped crown. The wood is known as bomanga and has many uses in building and construction.

== Description ==
Brachystegia laurentii is a fairly large evergreen tree, reaching a height of about 45 m (150 ft) and a diameter of 2 m (7 ft). The trunk is cylindrical, without buttresses but sometimes with flutings near the base, and unbranched for the first 25 m (80 ft). The outer bark is rough, yellowish-grey to dark grey, and peels away in large flakes. The inner bark is orange-red, thick and fibrous, darkening on exposure to the air. The crown is dense and umbrella-shaped, with ascending branches. The twigs are drooping, and they and the branches bear numerous lenticels. The leaves are pinnate with a short petiole swollen at its base and three to five pairs of oblong-elliptical leaflets, the basal ones being very small, and no terminal leaflet. The inflorescence is a terminal or axillary rounded panicle, the individual flowers being bisexual, small and fragrant; the flowers have five sepals, two to five thread-like petals, ten long stamens and a long coiled pistil. The fruits are flattened pods 15 to 25 cm (6 to 10 in) by 5 to 10 cm (2 to 4 in) containing two to three dark brown seeds about 3.5 cm (1.4 in) in diameter; when ripe, the two valves of the pod split violently apart and eject the seeds.

== Distribution and habitat ==
Brachystegia laurentii is native to tropical western Central Africa. Its range includes western Cameroon, Equatorial Guinea, Gabon, the Democratic Republic of the Congo and the Republic of the Congo. It grows in evergreen and semi-deciduous forests, often near rivers. It may be locally dominant, growing gregariously in stands of several hectares, with seedlings and saplings developing close to the parent tree.

== Uses ==
The sapwood of this tree is susceptible to attack by insects but the heartwood is resistant to boring insects and moderately resistant to termite and fungal attack. The timber has many uses including joinery, flooring, cabinet making, furniture, blockboard, veneer, and the manufacture of barrels, boxes and crates. The bark can be used for making ropes, nets, sacks, baskets and clothing, and also to make a substitute for soap.
