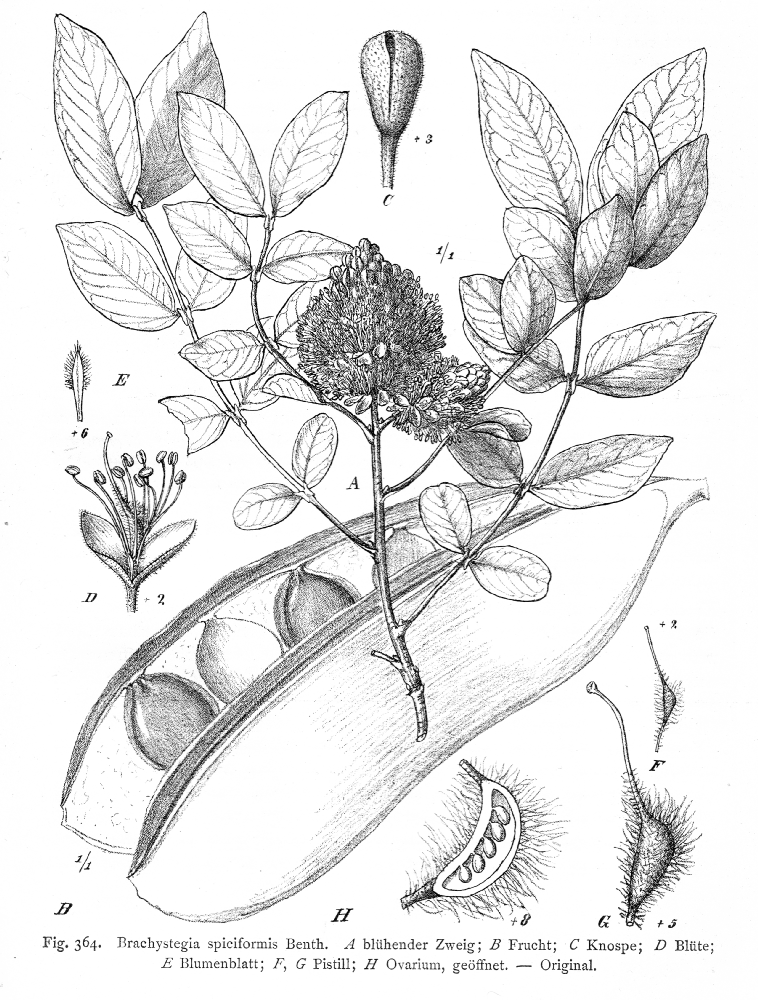

Scientific classification
- Kingdom: Plantae
- Clade: Tracheophytes
- Clade: Angiosperms
- Clade: Eudicots
- Clade: Rosids
- Order: Fabales
- Family: Fabaceae
- Subfamily: Detarioideae
- Tribe: Amherstieae
- Genus: Brachystegia
- Species: B. spiciformis

Binomial name
- Brachystegia spiciformis Benth.

Synonyms
- Brachystegia mpalensis Micheli

= Brachystegia spiciformis =

Species of legume

Brachystegia spiciformis, commonly known as zebrawood (not the genuine zebrawood, Microberlinia brazzavillensis), or msasa (spelled as masasa), is a medium-sized African tree having compound leaves and racemes of small fragrant green flowers. The tree is broad and has a distinctive amber and wine red colour when the young leaves sprout during spring (August–September). It grows in savanna, both open woodland and closed woodland of Southern and Eastern Africa, mostly Tanzania, Zambia, Zimbabwe, Malawi and Mozambique. The word msasa is commonly used as a proper name in African place names. The word also means 'rough plant' in Swahili. Other common names: mundu, myombo, mtondo (Tanzania), muputu (Zambia). The plant is known in the Venda language as mutsiwa, which means 'the one that is left behind'. An outlying population of Brachystegia has recently been discovered in the Soutpansberg mountains of northern South Africa. This tree is a protected species in South Africa.

== Distribution ==
The msasa is a tropical tree and grows best in open woodland where there is a sharp distinction between wet and dry seasons. The northern end of its range is near Tabora in Tanzania (about 5° S) and its southernmost extent is near Quissico on the coast of Mozambique just outside the tropics (about 25° S). Msasas need a minimum of around 500 mm rain, although the amount of rain in the summer growing season is more important than the annual rainfall. It needs a mean annual temperature of around 19 to 20 °C. It does not thrive under a combination of cold and wet conditions, and like many tropical plants it requires a hot dry period before the onset of the growing season.

== Appearance ==
The tree typically reaches a height of about 16 metres, although it is less tall in more drought-prone areas. In central Zambia and eastern Angola, magnificent specimens of about 18–19 metres are common due to the reliability of heavy rain during the growing season. It favours inland situations at an altitude of around 1000–1400 metres (due to the sharp difference between day and nighttime temperatures), although it grows down to sea level at its southern extremity. The tree presents a series of changes according to the seasons. It starts to lose its leaves as the cool season begins in late May (somewhat sluggishly), and by early August it is bare or nearly so. In late August, as temperatures rise again, the new leaves are produced. These are often bright red in colour, but vary from almost purple to brownish in different individuals. The colour shifts to deep green over a period of 10–20 days. The insignificant flowers appear after the new leaves and these are followed by the dehiscent pods (about 12–15 cm in length) in April. As with many legume species the pods split explosively and the flat seeds (about 2 cm across) are flung some distance from the parent tree.

== Ecology ==
The msasa is ecologically dominant over large areas of central Africa where sufficient summer rainfall is received. In many parts of Zimbabwe, Zambia, and Malawi, it is the dominant woodland tree, and its colourful springtime foliage is a striking seasonal marker. It can withstand light frost as long as little rain falls during the cool season, such as on the Mashonaland plateau, where it is often co-dominant with the similar mnondo (Julbernardia globiflora). Further north it is less dominant, but it reaches its greatest size. The msasa develops heavy spreading boughs and a shapely crown and mature specimens are valued in parks and gardens. However, it grows very slowly, so is seldom grown in cultivation.

== Timber characteristics and working properties ==
The timber of this species has the following features:

Sapwood	Off white, not suitable for conversion.
Heartwood	Uniform red brown, clearly defined
Weight at 12% moisture	735
Texture	Coarse
Grain	Tangential: Parebchyma bands curly, wavy, quite well defined. Radial: Striped, interlocked, well defined.
Risk from Borer	Heartwood has high resistance to attack. Sapwood highly vulnerable to attack - not suitable for conversion.
Risk from Fungi	Highly resistant heartwood, sapwood vulnerable - not suitable for conversion.
Seasoning	Only slight distortion if stacked properly and seasoned slowly, some degrade around knots.
Shrinkage	Radial:4.21% Tangenial: 4.05%
Sawing and Planning	Hardness and interlocked grain makes sawing difficult, tungsten-tipped teeth recommended. Planes to a lustrous finish.
Nail Holding	Pre boring recommended to prevent splitting.
Gluing	Glues firmly
Paint and Varnish	Takes a high gloss varnish finish
Uses of Timber	Agricultural implements; boxes and crating, cabinet making, carpentry, cart making, flooring (includes parquetry), joinery, scaffholding and sleepers.

Characteristic strength of Msasa

Modulus of Rupture (Mpa)	107,2
Modulus of Elasticity (Mpa x 10/3)	13,6
Maximum Crushing Strength Parallel to Grain (Mpa)	59,1
Maximum Sheer Strength Parallel to Grain (Mpa)	14,4

== Uses ==
Just as its appearance varies greatly from place to place, so does its use. While in some regions, where msasa trees do not grow very tall, it is often heavily branched and used mainly as fuel such as charcoal and firewood, in other parts, such as central and northern Mozambique, it is used for furniture, sleepers, and construction timber. In parts of southern Tanzania, the hard wood is highly sought after. It is also used for beehives, boats, and general construction. It is considered an all-purpose wood. Furniture production has increased, since the wood can be artificially dried in kilns, which prevents further drying and twisting of the processed wood.

In southern Tanzania, B. spiciformis has several medicinal applications, including using the roots to treat dysentery and stomach problems. It is an important shade tree. The leaves are known to be a good fodder and would likely provide good mulch. The species is not nitrogen-fixing.
