= Julbernardia seretii =

Conservation status
- Least Concern (IUCN 3.1)

Scientific classification
- Kingdom: Plantae
- Clade: Tracheophytes
- Clade: Angiosperms
- Clade: Eudicots
- Clade: Rosids
- Order: Fabales
- Family: Fabaceae
- Genus: Julbernardia
- Species: J. seretii

Binomial name
- Julbernardia seretii (De Wild.) Troupin

Synonyms
- Berlinia seretii De Wild. Seretoberlinia seretii (De Wild.) P.A.Duvign. Berlinia ledermannii Harms; Berlinia ledermannii var. dolichopoda Harms; Julbernardia ogoouensis Pellegr.

Species of legume

Julbernardia seretii, commonly known as the Congo zebrawood, is a species of legume in the family Fabaceae. It is found in tropical West and Central Africa.

== Description ==
Julbernardia seretii is a large tree growing to a height of 40 m (130 ft). The trunk is straight and cylindrical, up to 170 cm (5.6 ft) in diameter, and without branches for more than half its height. The flowers are white and fragrant, and the fruits are large pods, the seeds weighing about 4 g (0.14 oz).

== Distribution ==
This tree is a constituent of tropical rainforest in Nigeria, Cameroon, Equatorial Guinea, Gabon, the Republic of the Congo, the Democratic Republic of the Congo and Angola.

== Ecology ==
In the Ituri Rainforest, in the northeast of the Democratic Republic of the Congo, the dominant trees are J. seretii and Gilbertiodendron dewevrei, while in the Okapi Wildlife Reserve, J. seretii and Cynometra alexandri are the most abundant.

The seeds of this tree fall to the ground and dispersal is limited to a distance of up to 40 m (130 ft) from the edge of the crown. G. dewevrei has larger seeds (30 g (1 oz)) with more limited dispersal ability. In general, in forests where they are both present, J. seretii has the more numerous, faster growing seedlings but G. dewevrei the greatest presence in the canopy. The seedlings of both species can tolerate low light conditions, but among the saplings 50 cm (20 in) or taller, growth ceases in a higher proportion of J. seretii and mortality rates are considerably higher. This species also has a significantly lower lifespan than G. dewevrei.

== Uses ==
The timber of Julbernardia seretii, known as "Congo zebrawood" in the export trade, is dark brown and used in joinery, furniture, cabinet work and as a veneer. It also has uses in construction, boat building, flooring, carving and turnery, as well as being used for making ladders, toys, agricultural implements, tool handles and other items. The bark is used to make sandals, cords, containers and roof tiles.
