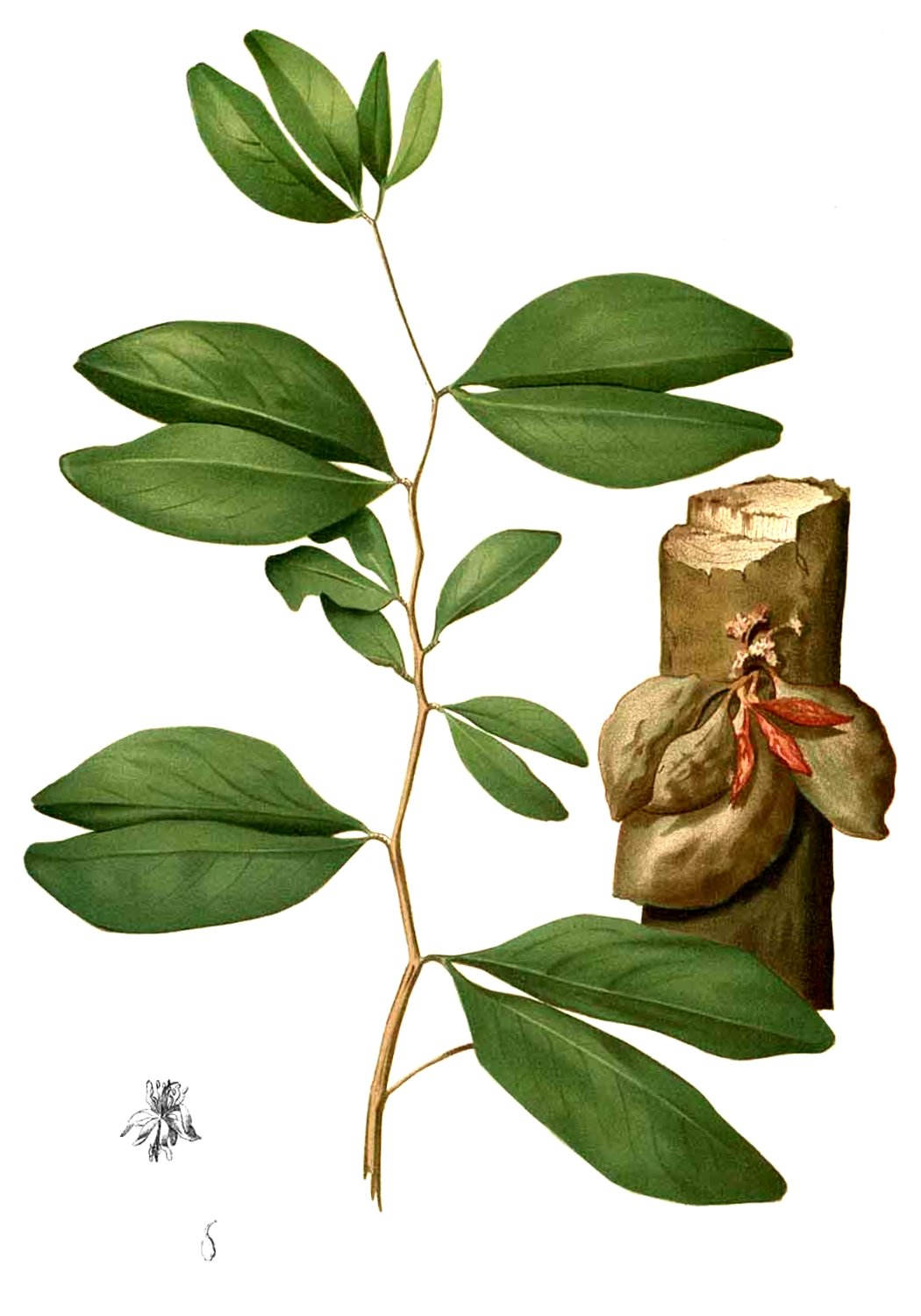
- Illustration of a related species

Conservation status
- Least Concern (IUCN 3.1)

Scientific classification
- Kingdom: Plantae
- Clade: Tracheophytes
- Clade: Angiosperms
- Clade: Eudicots
- Clade: Rosids
- Order: Fabales
- Family: Fabaceae
- Genus: Cynometra
- Species: C. alexandri

Binomial name
- Cynometra alexandri C.H.Wright

= Cynometra alexandri =

Uganda ironwood

Species of legume

Cynometra alexandri, the Uganda ironwood or muhimbi, is a species of legume that occurs in tropical lowland forests of central and east Africa. They grow gregariously in drier forest types and as a constituent of swamp forests. They reach some 120 feet (37 m) to 150 feet (46 m) in height, and larger trees often develop hollow boles and buttress roots.

== Taxonomy ==
According to Aleksandar Radosavljevic (2019), Cynometra alexandri along with other mainland tropical African (but not all) species of the genus Cynometra should be excluded from the genus and will be transferred to a new as yet un-named genus in the future.

== Distribution and habitat ==
In Uganda it is widespread in the lowland forests (below 2,000 metres a.s.l) in the Western Rift Escarpment, where it shows a tendency toward monospecific dominance. After initial colonising, a mixed forest would contain Uganda ironwood, Alstonia congensis, Trichilia prieuriana, Khaya anthotheca and Celtis mildbraedii. When climax forest develops at altitudes between 1,000 and 1,200 m, Uganda ironwood becomes highly dominant. Though a common species, its range has been reduced by wood cutting, large scale farming and subsistence cultivation.

== Uses ==
The durable and dull, reddish brown heartwood is resistant to termite damage or abrasion, while the greyish sapwood is permeable to preservatives. It is employed in industrial or heavy-duty flooring, besides construction, marine work and for railway sleepers.

Due to its physical properties, such as bending strength, inter-node distance, and leaf surface area, the Muhimbi is favoured by chimpanzees for their daily construction of sleeping platforms or "nests".
