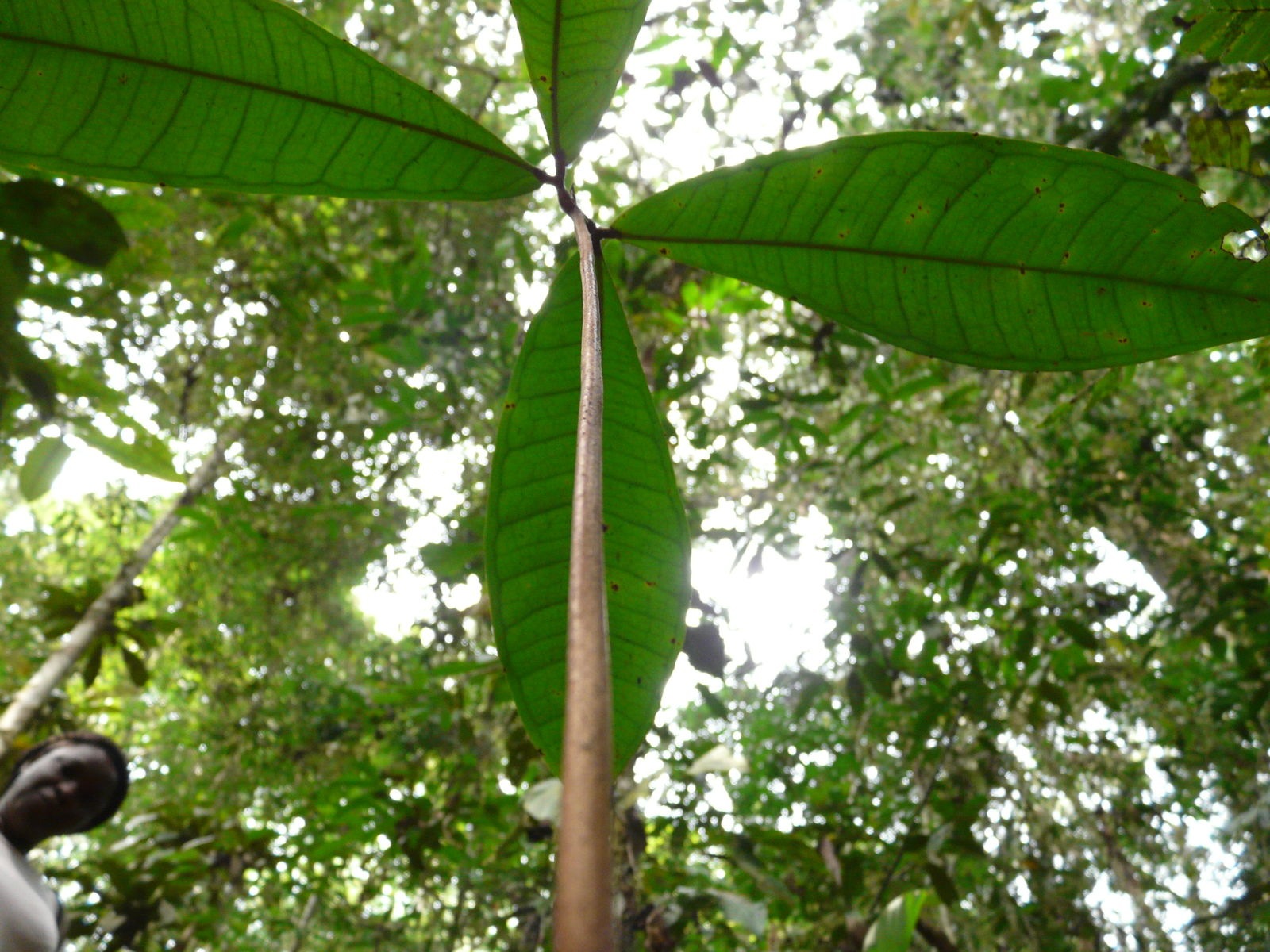

Conservation status
- Least Concern (IUCN 3.1)

Scientific classification
- Kingdom: Plantae
- Clade: Tracheophytes
- Clade: Angiosperms
- Clade: Eudicots
- Clade: Rosids
- Order: Fabales
- Family: Fabaceae
- Genus: Gilbertiodendron
- Species: G. dewevrei

Binomial name
- Gilbertiodendron dewevrei (De Wild.) J.Léonard

Synonyms
- Macrolobium dewevrei De Wild. Gilbertiodendron quadrifolium (Harms) J.Léonard; Macrolobium dewevrei f. bijugis De Wild. Macrolobium dewevrei f. trijugis De Wild. Macrolobium quadrifolium Harms

= Gilbertiodendron dewevrei =

Species of legume

Gilbertiodendron dewevrei is a species of tree in the family Fabaceae, native to tropical rain forests in Central Africa. It is often the dominant tree species of the Guineo-Congolian rainforest. The timber is traded as limbali, and is used for construction, flooring and railway sleepers. It is also used for making boats, furniture, tool handles and joinery and for making charcoal.

== Description ==
Gilbertiodendron dewevrei is a large evergreen tree, reaching a height of up to 45 m (150 ft). The crown is dense and allows little light through. The unbuttressed trunk is cylindrical, with a diameter of up to 200 cm (7 ft) or more, the lower half usually being devoid of branches. The bark is rough, greyish-brown or yellowish brown, peeling off in large flakes. The leaves are pendulous and leathery, the underside being covered with papillae, and they often have a few glands near the margins. They are alternate and pinnate with two to five pairs of leaflets. Each leaflet is ovate or elliptical, the lower leaflets being smaller than the terminal ones; they have rounded or cordate bases and obtuse apices.

The inflorescence is a loose terminal or axillary panicle clad with red hairs, the individual flowers being fragrant and having parts in fives. The sepals are purplish-red and fused at the base. The petals are unequal, one being deeply two-lobed and red, while the remainder are lanceolate. The fruits are flattened, woody pods, 15 to 30 cm (6 to 12 in) long by 6 to 10 cm (2 to 4 in) wide, with longitudinal ridges, and covered with short, dense, brown hairs. The seeds are shiny brown, oblong to triangular, flattened and up to 5 cm (2 in) in diameter.

== Distribution and habitat ==
Gilbertiodendron dewevrei is native to tropical forests in Central Africa, its range including Nigeria, Cameroon, Central African Republic, the Democratic Republic of the Congo, Equatorial Guinea, Gabon, the Republic of the Congo and northern Angola. It occurs in areas with an average annual precipitation of 1,600 to 1,900 mm (63 to 75 in) and a short dry season, at altitudes of up to 1,000 m (3,300 ft). It often grows in nearly pure, single species stands.

== Ecology ==
The seeds of this tree are eaten by various mammals including rodents, pigs, duikers, African buffaloes, elephants, gorillas and humans. The seeds are spread when the pods split explosively. The tree casts dense shade and this suppresses herbs and undergrowth on the forest floor, but is tolerated by the tree's own seedlings and saplings to the exclusion of other species. However, the pure stands of this tree are very sensitive to habitat disturbance; the felling of trees allows more light to reach the forest floor and the seedlings of G. dewevrei are outperformed by those of other, faster growing species of tree.

This tree has an ectomycorrhizal relationship with fungi that grow on its roots, particularly Pulveroboletus bembae. Several species of comet orchid grow on Gilbertiodendron dewevrei, including Angraecum distichum, Angraecum subulatum, Angraecum aporoides, and Angraecum podochiloides, and on fallen trees and branches, Angraecum gabonense.

== Uses ==
The timber has many uses in construction and building, including ship building, railway sleepers, mine props, flooring, joinery, doors and window frames, agricultural implements, garden furniture, turnery and toys. It is not generally used for cabinet work or firewood, but makes good charcoal.

The seeds contain certain toxic substances which can be removed by treatment. They are used for human consumption but mostly when other foods are scarce, boiled, roasted, ground into flour for making porridge or fermented and wrapped in Megaphrynium macrostachyum leaves, and subsequently roasted. The bark, leaves and sap have uses in herbal medicine, and strips of the inner bark are used to make bands for carrying baskets. In the northeastern Democratic Republic of the Congo, whole huts are constructed from this tree, with the addition of clay; the main supports are made from branches and partitions from smaller branches, tied together with string made from the inner bark, and the roof is thatched with the tree's leaves.
