= List of Angraecum species =

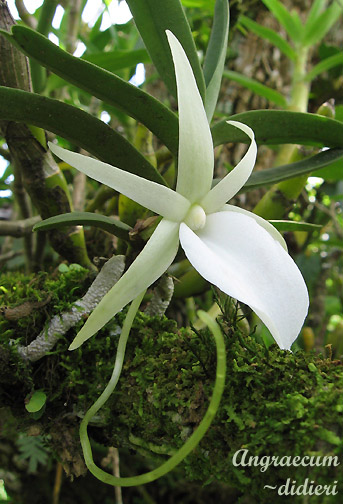
Flowering Angraecum didieri

Angraecum is a genus of orchids (Orchidaceae), containing about 220 species. They are commonly known as comet orchids. Most live in the African region, many on Madagascar, and some elsewhere around the western Indian Ocean.

== A ==
- Angraecum acutipetalum (Madagascar)
- Angraecum affine (WC Tropical Africa to Uganda)
- Angraecum alleizettei (C Madagascar)
- Angraecum aloifolium (NW Madagascar)
- Angraecum ambrense (N Madagascar)
- Angraecum amplexicaule (NE Madagascar)
- Angraecum ampullaceum (Madagascar)
- Angraecum andasibeense (N & C Madagascar)
- Angraecum andringitranum (SE Madagascar)
- Angraecum angustipetalum (W & WC Tropical Africa to Malawi)
- Angraecum ankeranense (C Madagascar)
- Angraecum aporoides (Nigeria to WC Tropical Africa)
- Angraecum appendiculoides (C Madagascar)
- Angraecum arachnites Schltr. (C Madagascar)
- Angraecum astroarche (São Tomé)
- Angraecum atlanticum (Eq. Guinea & Gabon)
- Angraecum aviceps (N Madagascar)

== B ==
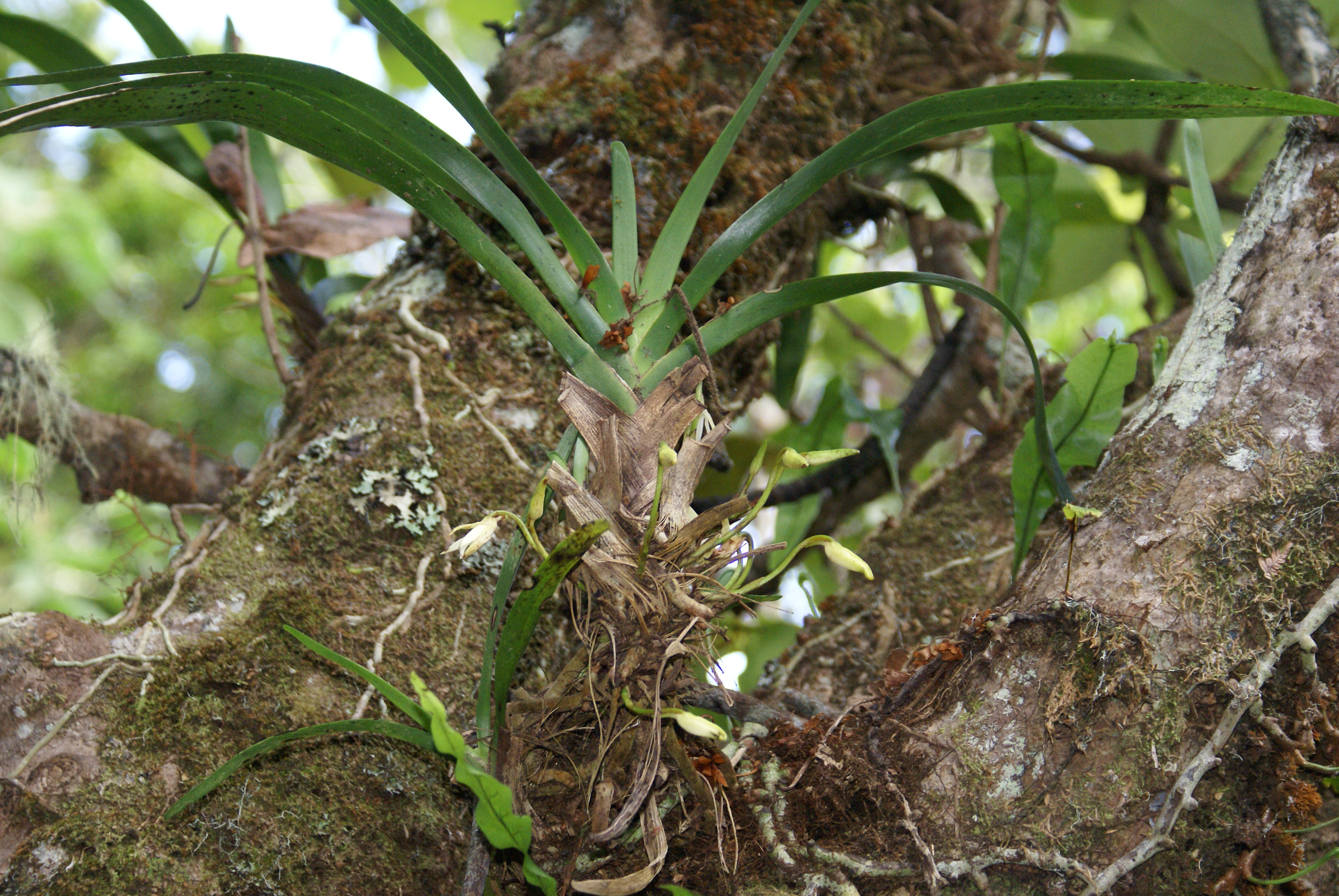
Angraecum borbonicum

- Angraecum bancoense (Ivory Coast, Cameroon)
- Angraecum baronii (N & C Madagascar)
- Angraecum bemarivoense (N Madagascar)
- Angraecum bicallosum (N Madagascar)
- Angraecum birrimense (W & WC Tropical Africa)
- Angraecum borbonicum (Réunion)
- Angraecum brachyrhopalon (N Madagascar)
- Angraecum bracteosum (Réunion)
- Angraecum breve (N Madagascar)
- Angraecum brevicornu (NE Tanzania)

== C ==
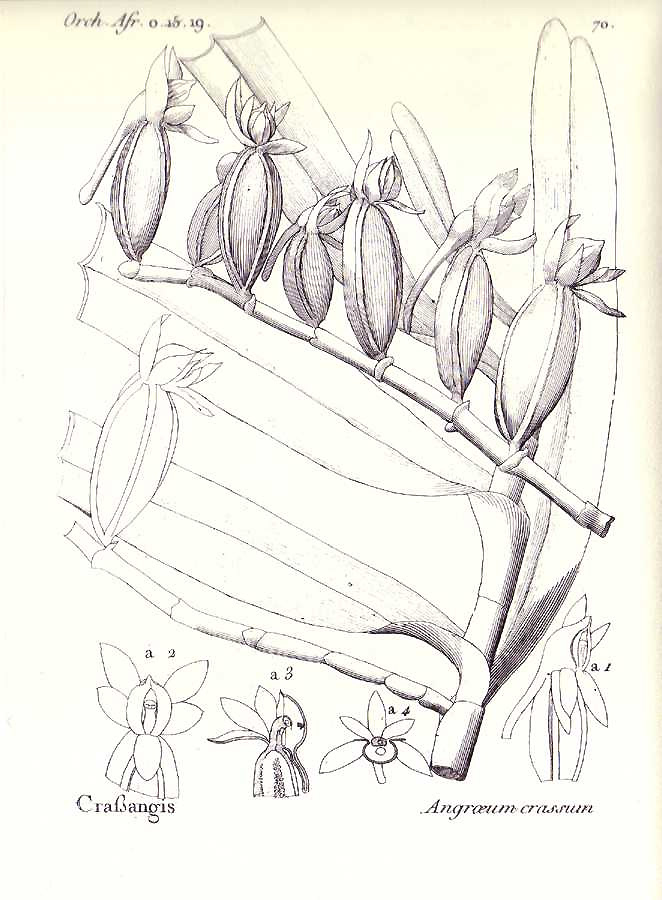
Angraecum crassum parts drawing

- Angraecum cadetii (Mauritius, Réunion)
- Angraecum calceolus (Mozambique to W Indian Ocean)
- Angraecum caricifolium (C Madagascar)
- Angraecum caulescens (Mascarenes, Madagascar)
- Angraecum chaetopodum (N Madagascar)
- Angraecum chamaeanthus (Kenya, Tanzania, Malawi, Mozambique, Zimbabwe)
- Angraecum chermozoni (NE Madagascar)
- Angraecum chimanimaniense (Zimbabwe)
- Angraecum chloranthum (NE Madagascar)
- Angraecum cilaosianum (Réunion)
- Angraecum claessensii (W Tropical Africa to Congo)
- Angraecum clareae (Madagascar)
- Angraecum clavigerum (Madagascar)
- Angraecum compactum Schltr. (Madagascar)
- Angraecum compressicaule (C Madagascar)
- Angraecum conchiferum (Kenya to S Africa)
- Angraecum cordemoyi (Réunion)
- Angraecum coriaceum (Madagascar)
- Angraecum cornigerum (Réunion)
- Angraecum cornucopiae (Madagascar)
- Angraecum corynoceras (N Madagascar)
- Angraecum costatum (Mascarenes)
- Angraecum coutrixii (SE Madagascar)
- Angraecum crassifolium (Réunion)
- Angraecum crassum (NE Madagascar)
- Angraecum cribbianum (Gabon)
- Angraecum cucullatum (Réunion)
- Angraecum cultriforme (Kenya to NE KwaZulu-Natal)
- Angraecum curvicalcar (N Madagascar)
- Angraecum curvicaule (NE Madagascar)
- Angraecum curvipes (Cameroon)

== D ==
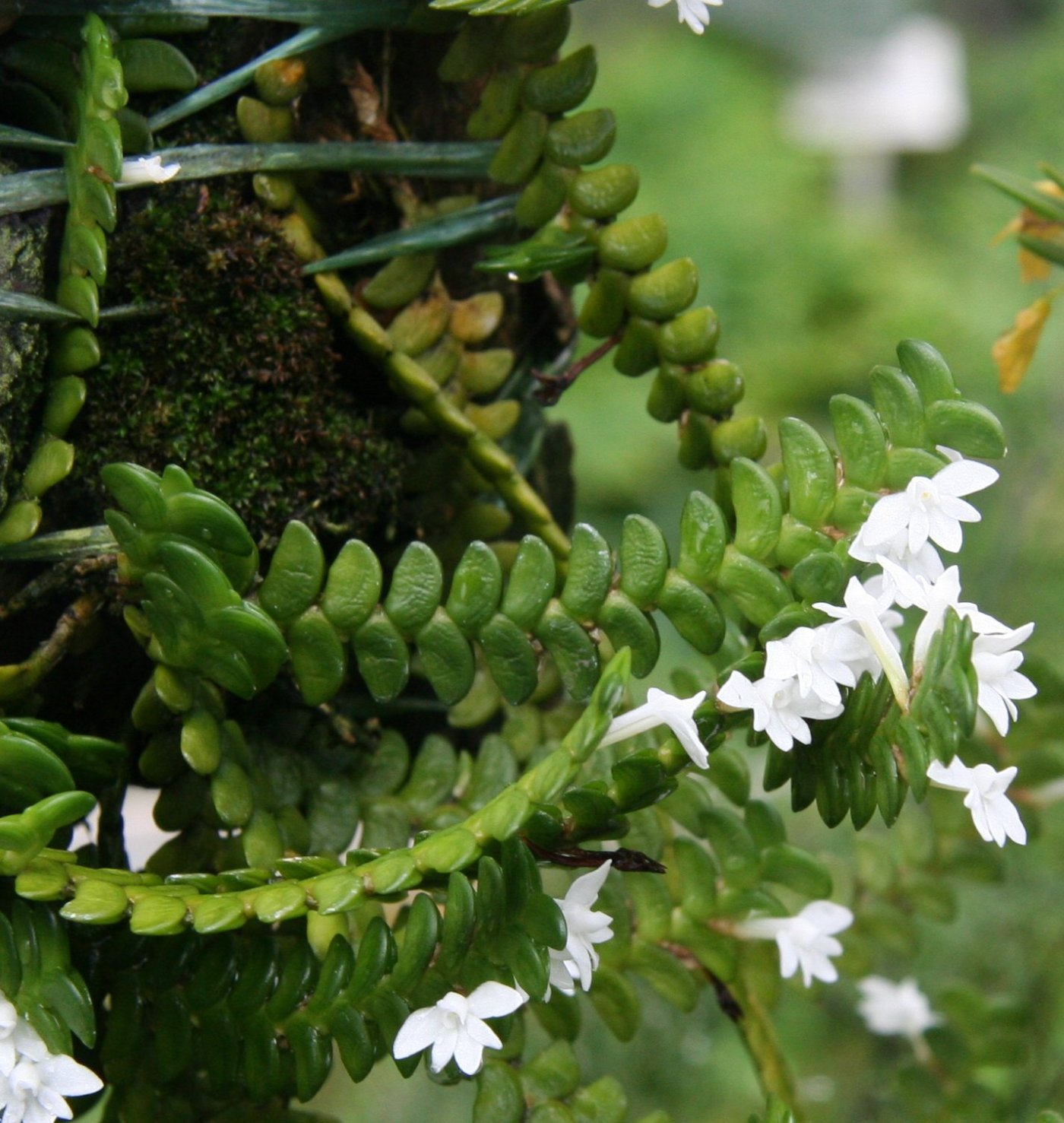
Angraecum distichum

- Angraecum danguyanum (NE Madagascar)
- Angraecum dasycarpum (E Madagascar)
- Angraecum dauphinense (SW Madagascar)
- Angraecum decaryanum (SW Madagascar)
- Angraecum decipiens (Kenya to N Tanzania)
- Angraecum dendrobiopsis (N Madagascar)
- Angraecum didieri (Madagascar)
- Angraecum distichum (W Tropical Africa to Angola and Uganda)
- Angraecum dives (Socotra, SW Somalia to Tanzania)
- Angraecum dollii (C Madagascar)
- Angraecum drouhardii (N. Madagascar)
- Angraecum dryadum (Madagascar)

== E ==
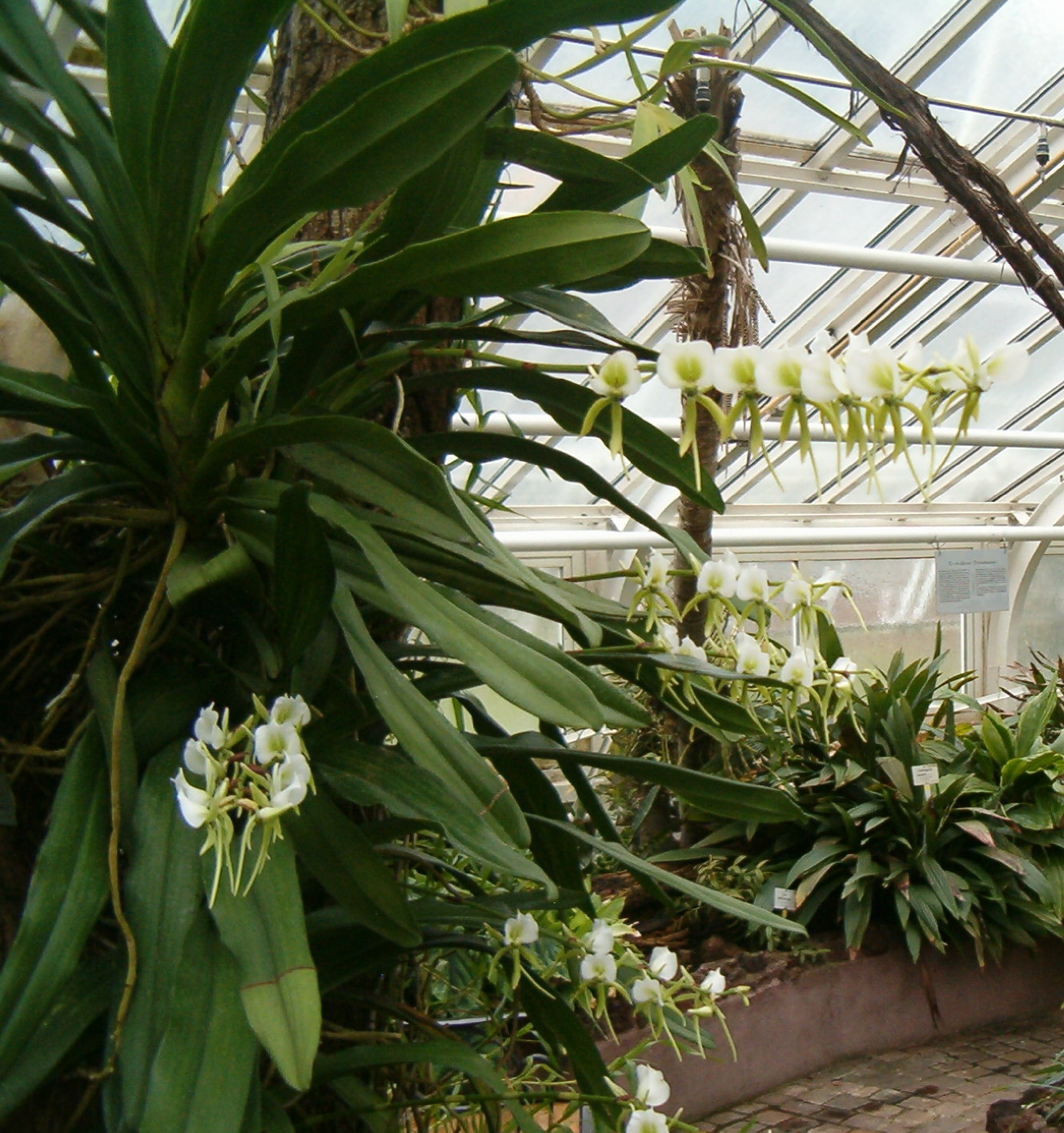
Angraecum eburneum

- Angraecum eburneum (SE Kenya to E Tanzania, Pemba, Zanzibar, W Indian Ocean)
  - Angraecum eburneum ssp. eburneum (W Indian Ocean)
  - Angraecum eburneum ssp. giryamae (SE Kenya to E Tanzania, Pemba, Zanzibar)
  - Angraecum eburneum ssp. superbum (Seychelles, Comoros, Madagascar)
  - Angraecum eburneum ssp. xerophilum (SW Madagascar)
  - Angraecum eburneum var. longicalcar
- Angraecum egertonii (S Nigeria to Gabon)
- Angraecum eichlerianum (Nigeria to Angola)
  - Angraecum eichlerianum var. curvicalcaratum (Cameroon)
  - Angraecum eichlerianum var. eichlerianum (Nigeria to Angola)
- Angraecum elephantinum (C Madagascar)
- Angraecum elliotii (Madagascar)
- Angraecum equitans (N Madagascar)
- Angraecum erectum (E Tropical Africa to Zambia)
- Angraecum expansum (Réunion)
  - Angraecum expansum ssp. expansum (Réunion)
  - Angraecum expansum ssp. inflatum (Réunion)

== F ==
- Angraecum falcifolium (SE Madagascar)
- Angraecum ferkoanum (Madagascar)
- Angraecum filicornu (Mascarenes, Madagascar)
- Angraecum firthii (Cameroon, Uganda, Kenya)
- Angraecum flavidum (N Madagascar)
- Angraecum floribundum (C Madagascar)
- Angraecum florulentum (Comoros)

== G ==
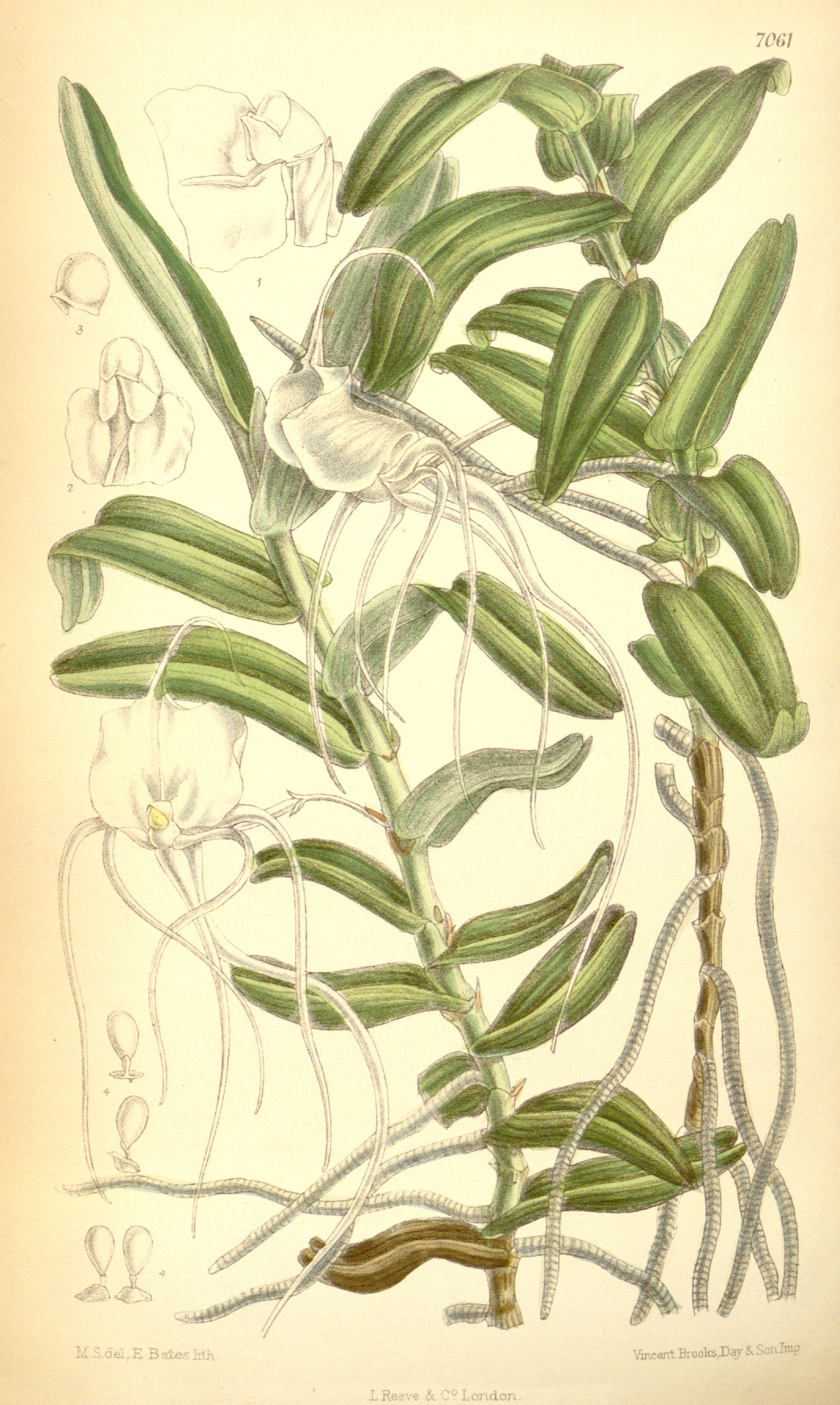
Angraecum germinyanum

- Angraecum geniculatum (W Zambia)
- Angraecum germinyanum (Mascarenes, Comoros, Madagascar)
- Angraecum guillauminii (Madagascar)

== H ==
- Angraecum hermannii (Réunion)
- Angraecum humbertii (SW Madagascar)
- Angraecum humblotianum (NE Madagascar)
- Angraecum humile (Rwanda to Zimbabwe)
- Angraecum huntleyoides (NE Madagascar)

== I ==
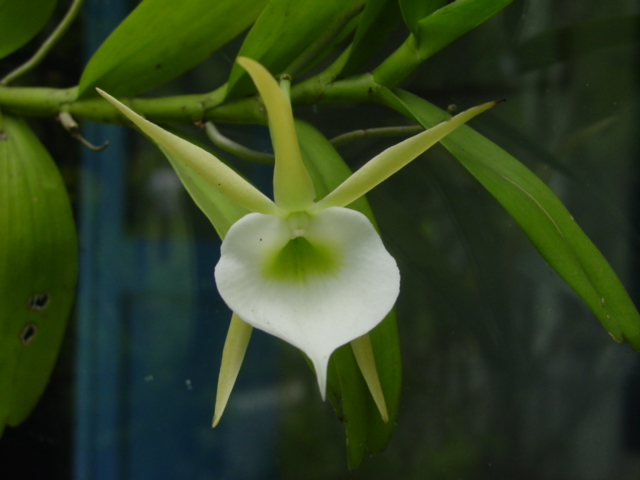
Angraecum infundibulare flower

- Angraecum imerinense (C Madagascar)
- Angraecum implicatum (Réunion, Madagascar)
- Angraecum inapertum (Mascarenes, Madagascar)
- Angraecum infundibulare (Nigeria to E Tropical Africa)

== K ==
- Angraecum keniae (Kenya)
- Angraecum kranzlinianum (N & NE Madagascar)

== L ==
- Angraecum laggiarae (Madagascar)
- Angraecum lecomtei (NE Madagascar)
- Angraecum leonis (Comoros, Madagascar)
- Angraecum letouzeyi (NE Madagascar)
- Angraecum liliodorum (Réunion)
- Angraecum linearifolium (N Madagascar)
- Angraecum lisowskianum (Nigeria to Equatorial Guinea)
- Angraecum litorale (Madagascar)
- Angraecum longicalcar (Madagascar)
- Angraecum longicaule (Madagascar)
- Angraecum longinode (Réunion)

== M ==
- Angraecum macilentum (Réunion)
- Angraecum madagascariense (N Madagascar)
- Angraecum magdalenae (Madagascar)
  - Angraecum magdalenae var. latiilabellum (N Madagascar)
  - Angraecum magdalenae var. magdalenae (C Madagascar)
- Angraecum mahavavense (N Madagascar)
- Angraecum mauritianum (Mascarenes, Madagascar)
- Angraecum meirax (Comoros, Madagascar)
- Angraecum melanostictum (Madagascar)
- Angraecum metallicum (Madagascar)
- Angraecum microcharis (N Madagascar)
- Angraecum minus (Tanzania, Zambia, Zimbabwe)
- Angraecum minutum (Réunion)
- Angraecum mirabile (NE Madagascar)
- Angraecum moandense (W Trop Africa to Uganda)
- Angraecum modicum (Liberia)
- Angraecum mofakoko (Congo)
- Angraecum moratii (NE Madagascar)
- Angraecum multiflorum (W Indian Ocean)
- Angraecum multinominatum (W Tropical Africa to Gabon)
- Angraecum muscicolum (C Madagascar)
- Angraecum musculiferum (N Madagascar)
- Angraecum myrianthum (SW Madagascar)

== N ==
- Angraecum nanum (Mascarenes)
- Angraecum nasutum (N Madagascar)

== O ==
- Angraecum oberonia (Mascarenes)
- Angraecum obesum (C Madagascar)
- Angraecum oblongifolium (SE Madagascar)
- Angraecum obversifolium (Mascarenes)
- Angraecum ochraceum (SE Madagascar)
- Angraecum onivense (C Madagascar)

== P ==
- Angraecum palmicolum (C Madagascar)
- Angraecum palmiforme (Mascarenes)
- Angraecum panicifolium (NE Madagascar)
- Angraecum parvulum (Mascarenes)
- Angraecum pauciramosum (Madagascar)
- Angraecum pectinatum (Mascarenes, Comoros, Madagascar)
- Angraecum penzigianum (SE Madagascar)
- Angraecum pergracile (N Madagascar)
- Angraecum perhumile (C Madagascar)
- Angraecum perparvulum (Madagascar)
- Angraecum petterssonianum (W Rwanda)
- Angraecum peyrotii (Madagascar)
- Angraecum pingue (Mascarenes)
- Angraecum pinifolium (NE Madagascar)
- Angraecum platycornu (Madagascar)
- Angraecum podochiloides (W & WC Tropical Africa)
- Angraecum popowii (Madagascar)
- Angraecum potamophilum (NW Madagascar)
- Angraecum praestans Schltr. (Madagascar)
- Angraecum protensum (SE Madagascar)
- Angraecum pseudodidieri (N Madagascar)
- Angraecum pseudopetiolatum (Réunion)
- Angraecum pseuofilicornu (N Madagascar)
- Angraecum pterophyllum (C Madagascar)
- Angraecum pumilio (N Madagascar)
- Angraecum pusillum (E Zimbabwe to S Africa)
- Angraecum pyriforme

== R ==
- Angraecum ramosum (Mascarenes)
- Angraecum ramulicolum (C Madagascar)
- Angraecum reygaertii (Cameroon to Uganda)
- Angraecum rhizanthium (N Madagascar)
- Angraecum rhizomaniacum (N Madagascar)
- Angraecum rhynchoglossum (C Madagascar)
- Angraecum rigidifolium (C Madagascar)
- Angraecum rostratum (SE Madagascar)
- Angraecum rubellum (NE Madagascar)
- Angraecum rutenbergianum (Madagascar)

== S ==
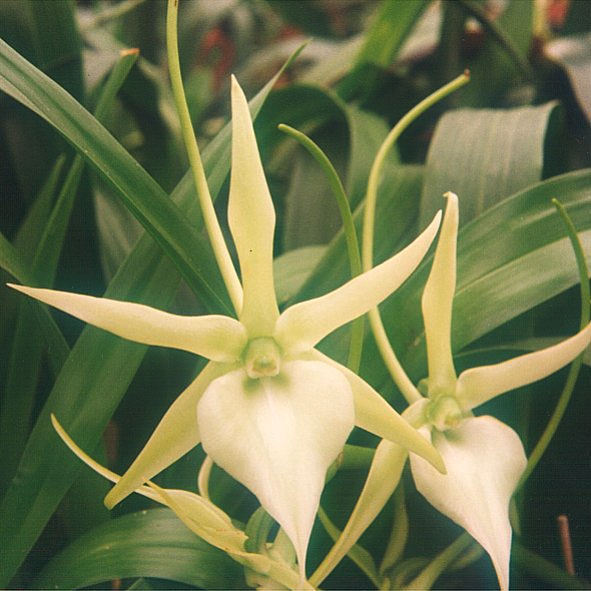
Angraecum sesquipedale flowers

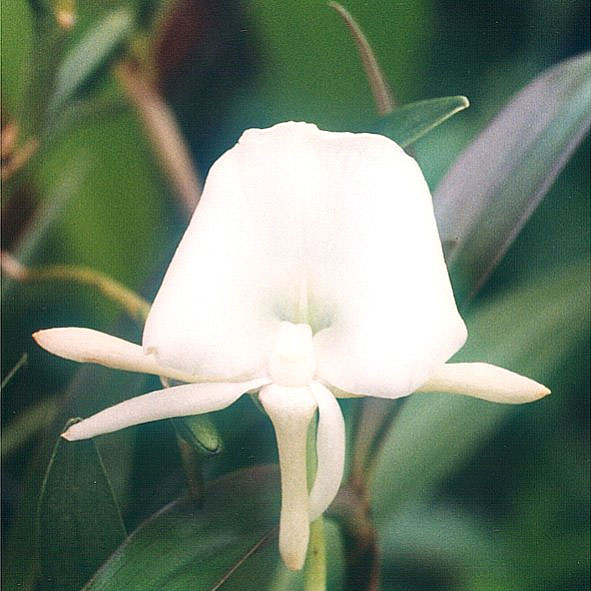
Angraecum scottianum flower

- Angraecum sacciferum (São Tomé to Kenya and S Africa)
- Angraecum sacculatum (Madagascar)
- Angraecum salazianum (Réunion)
- Angraecum sambiranoense (N & C Madagascar)
- Angraecum sanfordii
- Angraecum scalariforme (N Madagascar, Comoros)
- Angraecum scottianum (Comoros)
- Angraecum sedifolium (C Madagascar)
- Angraecum serpens (Madagascar)
- Angraecum sesquipedale (E & S Madagascar)
  - Angraecum sesquipedale var. angustifolium (SW Madagascar)
  - Angraecum sesquipedale var. sesquipedale (E & S Madagascar)
- Angraecum sesquisectangulum (Madagascar)
- Angraecum setipes (C Madagascar)
- Angraecum sinuatiflorum (SE Madagascar)
- Angraecum sororium (Madagascar)
- Angraecum spectabile (NW Tanzania)
- Angraecum spicatum (Réunion)
- Angraecum stella-africae (Malawi to Transvaal)
- Angraecum sterrophyllum (C Madagascar)
- Angraecum stolzii (Tanzania to Zambia)
- Angraecum striatum (Réunion)

== T ==
- Angraecum tamarindicolum
- Angraecum tenellum (Réunion, Madagascar)
- Angraecum tenuifolium (Réunion)
- Angraecum tenuipes (N Madagascar)
- Angraecum tenuispica (Madagascar)
- Angraecum teres (Tanzania)
- Angraecum teretifolium (Madagascar)
- Angraecum triangulifolium (Madagascar)
- Angraecum trichoplectron (Madagascar)
- Angraecum triquetrum (Mascarenes)

== U ==
- Angraecum umbrosum (Malawi)
- Angraecum undulatum (Mascarenes)
- Angraecum urschianum (NE Madagascar)

== V ==
- Angraecum verecundum (C Madagascar)
- Angraecum vesiculatum (N Madagascar)
- Angraecum vesiculiferum (C Madagascar)
- Angraecum viguieri (Madagascar)
- Angraecum viride (Tanzania)
- Angraecum viridiflorum (Réunion)

== X ==
- Angraecum xylopus (Comoros)

== Y ==
- Angraecum yuccifolium (Mauritius)

== Z ==
- Angraecum zaratananae (N Madagascar)
- Angraecum zeylanicum (Mahé, Sri Lanka)
