= A. erectum =

A. erectum may refer to:

- Angraecum erectum, an orchid species in the genus Angraecum found in tropical Africa
- Asplenium erectum, a synonym for Asplenium aequibasis, a fern species endemic to Saint Helena

== See also ==
- Erectum (disambiguation)
