= H. erecta =

H. erecta may refer to:

- Haloragis erecta, the toatoa, a flowering plant species native to New Zealand

== Synonyms ==
- Hypoxis erecta, a synonym for Hypoxis hirsuta, an ornamental plant native to the United States
- Hamelia erecta, a synonym for Hamelia patens, a large perennial shrub or small tree species native to the American subtropics and tropics

== See also ==
- H. erectus (disambiguation)
- H (disambiguation)
- Erecta
