= Upright position =

Upright position may refer to:

- Upright position (electronics), a signal upconverted to the multiplexer band without inverting the frequencies
- an upright position

== See also ==
- Erect (disambiguation)
