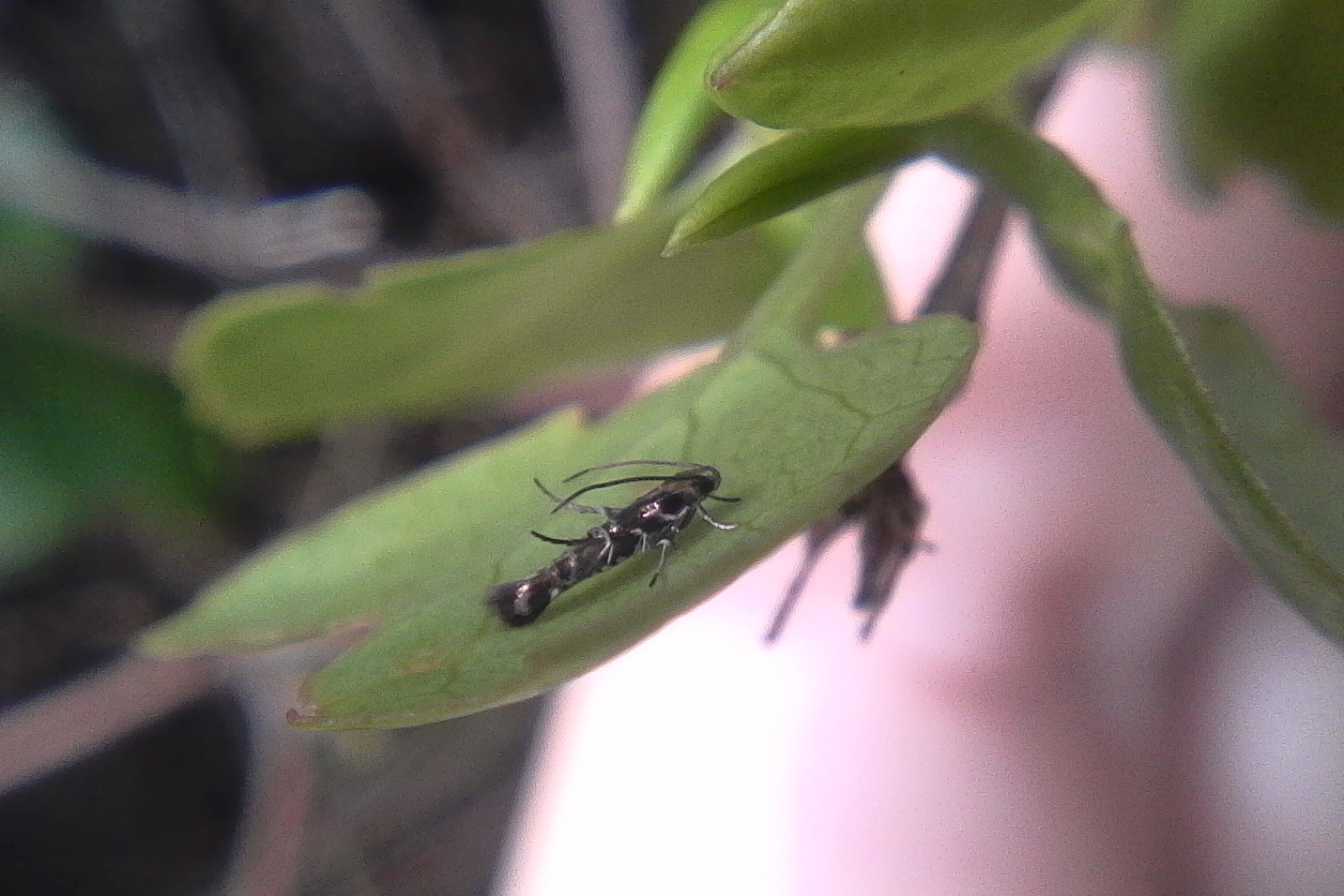

Scientific classification
- Kingdom: Animalia
- Phylum: Arthropoda
- Clade: Pancrustacea
- Class: Insecta
- Order: Lepidoptera
- Family: Momphidae
- Genus: Zapyrastra
- Species: Z. calliphana

Binomial name
- Zapyrastra calliphana Meyrick, 1889

= Zapyrastra calliphana =

Species of moth found in New Zealand and the Norfolk Islands

Zapyrastra calliphana is a species of moth of the family Momphidae. It was first described by Edward Meyrick in 1889. It is found throughout New Zealand including at the Manawatāwhi / Three Kings Islands as well as at the Norfolk Islands. The preferred habitat of this species are native forest clearings, shrubland or coastal habitat such as scrub or dunes. The larvae of this species are leaf miners and are hosted by Muehlenbeckia species. There are likely several generations during the New Zealand summer and one generation overwinters as pupae. This species is a day flying moth and adults can be observed on the wing from October to March.

== Taxonomy ==
This species was first described by Edward Meyrick in 1889 using specimens collected at Christchurch and the Bealey River. George Hudson discussed and illustrated this species in his 1928 book The butterflies and moths of New Zealand. The male lectotype specimen, designated by J. S. Dugdale in 1988, was collected at Riccarton Bush in Christchurch and is held at the Natural History Museum, London.

== Description ==
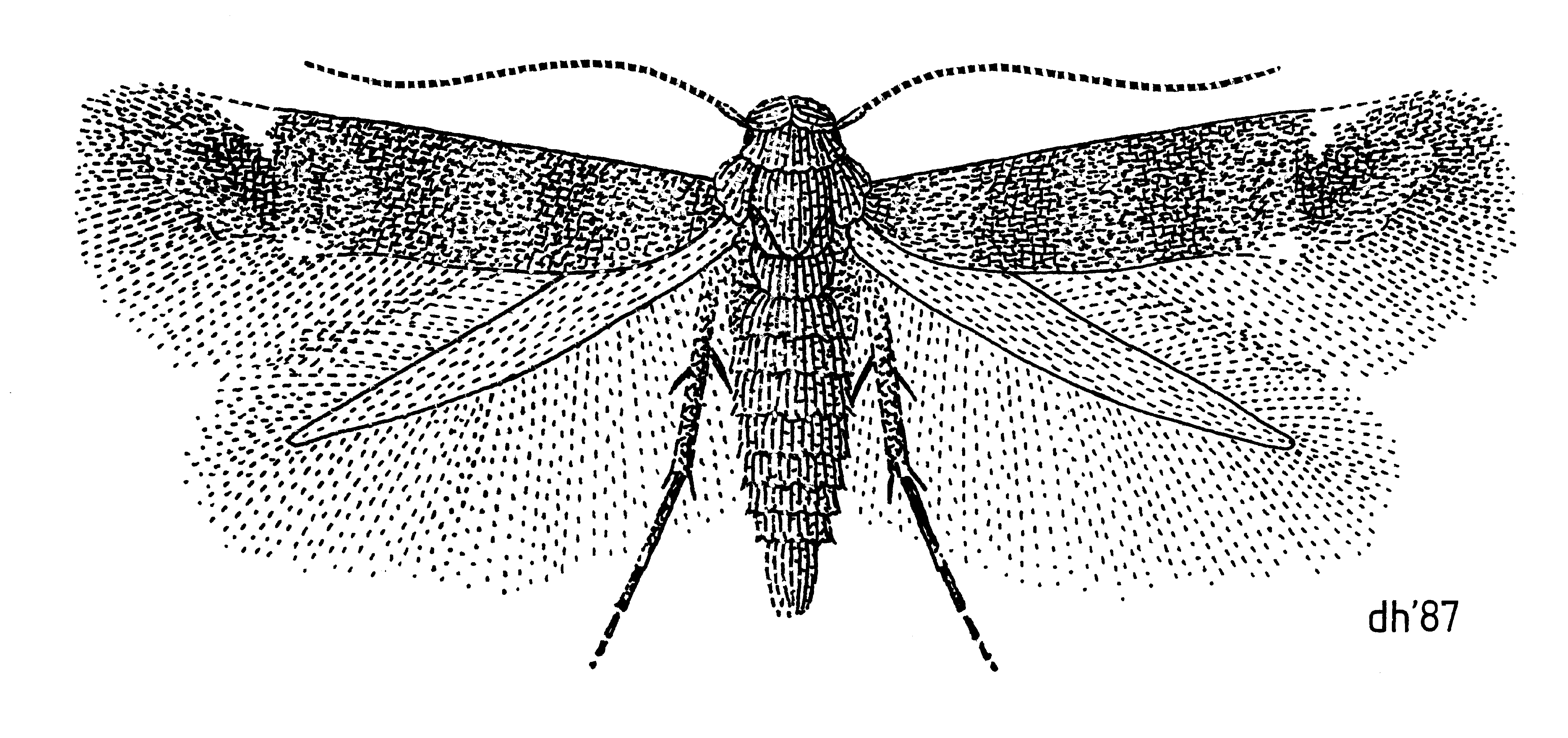
Illustration of Zapyrastra calliphana

Meyrick described this species as follows:

♂♀. 9. 5-8mm. Head, palpi, antennae, thorax, abdomen, and legs dark shining bronze, face whitish-bronze, legs spotted with white. Forewings lanceolate; bright dark golden-bronze; markings pale violet-golden-metallic; a fascia near base, often ill-defined; a nearly perpendicular fascia before middle; a dot in disc beyond middle, beneath which is a black dot or small spot on fold; an inwardly-oblique fascia at 3/4; a small spot on anal angle; a streak along hindmargin from apex; a triangular snow-white spot on costa near apex : cilia fuscous-grey, round apex with two blackish lines, and a minute white dot above apex. Hindwings dark fuscous; cilia fuscous-grey.

There are two species that are very similar in appearance to Z. calliphana. Firstly Z. stellata which only occurs in the eastern parts of the South Island. The other species is undescribed and can be found in the North Island where its larvae mine leaves of species in the genus Haloragis.

== Distribution ==
This species is found throughout New Zealand including at the Manawatāwhi / Three Kings Islands as well as at the Norfolk Islands.

== Habitat and host species ==
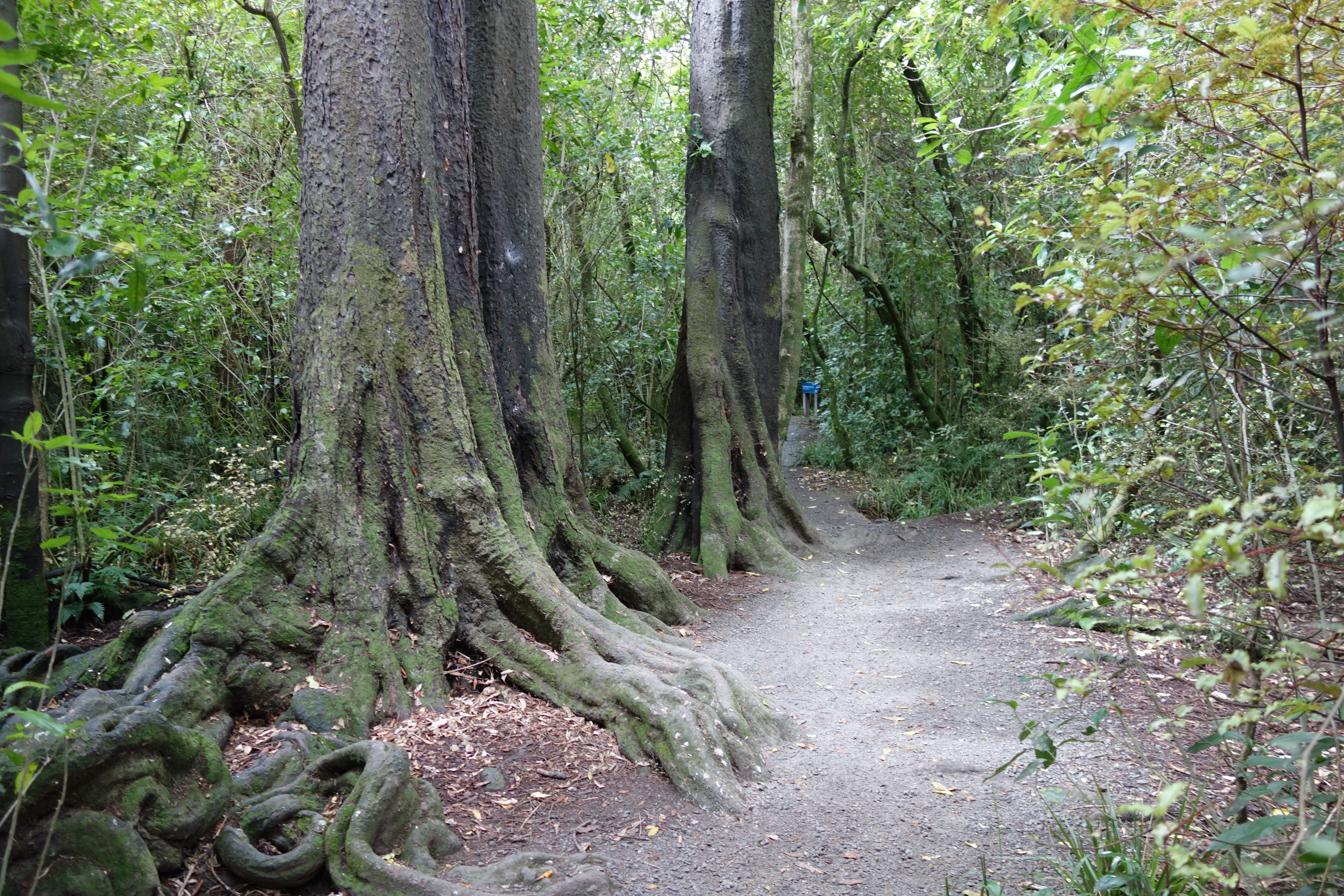
Riccarton Bush, type locality for this species.

This species lives are variety of habitats including native forest clearings, coastal dunes and shrubland. The larvae of Z. calliphana feed on species in the genus Muehlenbeckia including Muehlenbeckia australis and Muehlenbeckia complexa.

== Life cycle and behaviour ==
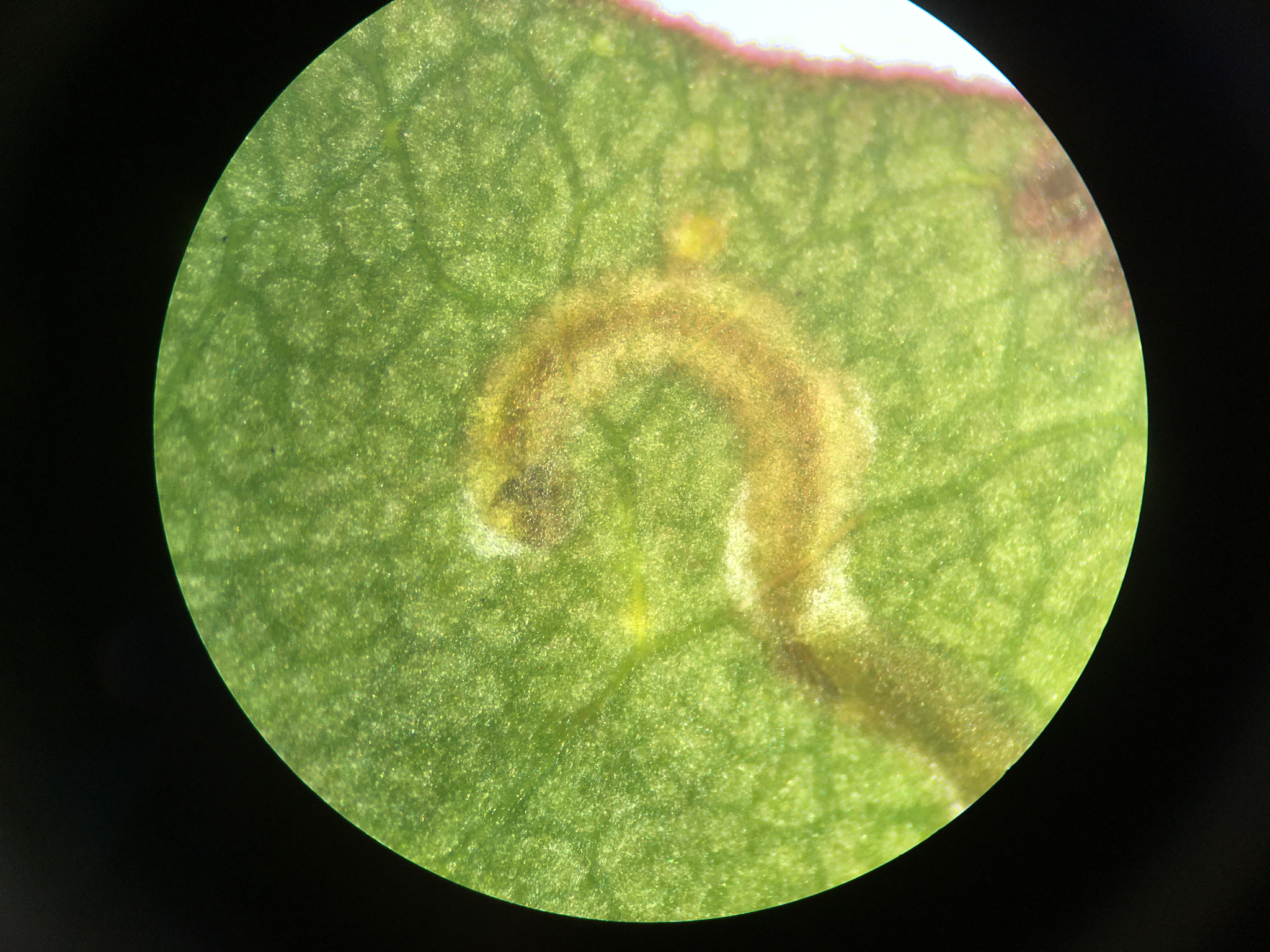
Zapyrastra calliphana larvae

This species forms mines in Muehlenbeckia leaves and pupates within the leaf mine forming a cocoon. It are likely there are several generations of this species during summer with one overwintering as pupae. Adults are on the wing mainly during the spring and summer months, from October to January. However adults have been observed as late as March and in captivity have emerged in July. This species is a day flying moth and can be observed flying around their larval host plants in sunshine, though their small size does make them more difficult to observe. Z. calliphana have been collected via malaise traps.
