= Homo erectus (disambiguation) =

Homo erectus is a species of archaic humans.

Homo erectus may also refer to:

- Homo erectus subspecies, numerous subspecies divisions of H. erectus, especially Asian erectus subspecies

== Arts and entertainment ==
- Homo Erectus (film), 2007 comedy film
- Homo erectus (album), 1998 rock/pop album
- Homo Erectus, a Japanese metal album by Orange Sunshine published by Leaf Hound Records
- Homo Erectus, a single from the album Baby Face: Act One by Pencil Battery

== See also ==
- Homo
- H. erectus (disambiguation)
- Homo (disambiguation)
- Erectus (disambiguation)
