= Erectus =

Erectus, a Latin word meaning erect, may refer to:

taxonomy

- Homo erectus, an extinct species of hominin
- Bryanthus × erectus, a species of ornamental plant of family Ericaceae now placed in the genus × Phyllothamnus
- a rosemary cultivar

popular culture

- Cultösaurus Erectus, a 1980 album by Blue Öyster Cult
- Dennis Erectus, a personality on San Jose, California's radio KOME
- Nippleus Erectus, a drummer of Gwar
- Pithecanthropus Erectus (album), a 1956 album by jazz composer and bassist Charles Mingus
- Rattus Erectus 1976-1982, a Mickey Ratt compilation

== See also ==
- Including use as a species name
- List of Latin and Greek words commonly used in systematic names
- Erecta
- Erectum (disambiguation)
- H. erectus (disambiguation)
- Homo erectus (disambiguation)
