= Erection (disambiguation) =

Erection is the physiological engorgement with blood of the tissue of a penis.

Erection also may refer to:

== Physiology ==
- Clitoral erection
- Nipple erection
- Piloerection, a muscle-effected rising of hair

== Other ==
- Construction, erection of a building
- Erection (film), a 1971 short film by John Lennon with music by Yoko Ono
- Canonical erection, the process of creation of a parish or a religious institute in the Roman Catholic church
- Gyro erection, the process of spinning up a gyroscopic attitude indicator and aligning it to vertical

== See also ==
- New Erections, 2007 album
- New Erection, Virginia, unincorporated community
- Erectile tissue
- Erect (disambiguation)
