= Träume sind stärker =

Studio album by Schürzenjäger
- Released: 1996
- Genre: Pop, rock
- Length: 55:35
- Label: BMG Ariola Media GmbH
- Producer: Rudolf Müssig

Schürzenjäger chronology
Glory-Hallelujah! (1995)	Träume sind stärker (1996)	Homo erectus (1997)

Träume sind stärker (English: Dreams are stronger) is a pop/rock album by the Austrian band Schürzenjäger. It was released in 1996 by BMG Ariola Media GmbH.

== Track listing ==
1. Träume sind stärker ("Dreams are stronger") – Müssig/Kunze – 4:51
2. 's braucht net viel ("It doesn't need much") – Müssig/C. Leis-Bendorff – 3:31
3. Am Sonntag in der Kirch'n ("Sunday at church") – Müssig/Kunze – 3:23
4. Der große kleine Mann ("The great small man") – Müssig/C. Leis-Bendorff – 2:52
5. Wenn i oamal nimmer bin ("If I'm once gone") – Keinrath/Spitzer – 3:$9
6. Junge Spinner ("Young fools") – Moll/Greiner – 4:01
7. Des taugt ma ("That suits me") – Müssig – 4:17
8. G'sundheit (Darauf drink ma oan) ("Cheers! (We drink to that))" – Müssig/C. Leis-Bendorff/Eberharter/Pfister/Steinlechner – 2:27
9. I werd dasein ("I'll be there") – Müssig – 5:55
10. Sie braucht koa Musik, um zu tanz'n ("She doesn't need music to dance") – Müssig/C. Leis-Bendorff – 3:56
11. Bei dir ("With you") – Gorgoglione/Müssig – 4:23
12. Abel & Kain ("Abel and Cain") – Müssig – 4:22
13. Sollt' halt net so bleib'n ("It shouldn't be like that") – Müssig/C. Leis-Bendorff – 3:49
14. Sollt' halt net so bleib'n (Instrumental) – 2:59

== Charts ==
Chart (1996)	Peak position
Austrian Albums (Ö3 Austria)	2
German Albums (Offizielle Top 100)	6
Swiss Albums (Schweizer Hitparade)	34
