= Schürzenjäger =

Austrian band

- Also known as: Zillertaler Schürzenjäger
- Origin: Tyrol, Austria
- Genres: Volksmusik; Rock; Schlager; Pop music Polka
- Years active: 1973–2007, 2011–
- Labels: Tyrolis; BMG Ariola
- Members: Dominik Ofner (2021–present); Alfred Eberharter Jr. (1998–present); Andreas Marberger (2011–present); Christof von Haniel (1999–present); Dennis Tschoeke (2017–present)
- Past members: Peter Steinlechner (1973–2007); Alfred Eberharter (1973–2025; Willi Kröll (1973–2000); Freddy Pfister (1986–1998); Patrick Cox (1989–2007); Günter Haag (1992–1996); Christian Dzida (1995–1998, deceased); Florian Leis-Bendorff (1996–2005, deceased); Ludwig Götz (1996–present); Carsten Gronwald (1996–present); Christian Felke (1996–present) Nils Tuxen (2001–2007) Stefan "Stevy" Wilhelm (2011–2020); Johannes Hintersteiner (2011–2016); Georg Daviotis (2011–2017)
- Website: www.schuerzenjaeger.com

Die Schürzenjäger, originally named Die Zillertaler Schürzenjäger, was a volksmusik band from Tirol, Austria.

Initially playing traditional volksmusik with yodeling and instruments such as the accordion, the band originally consisted of vocalist Peter Steinlechner, bassist Alfred Eberharter and guitarist Willi Kröll. Drummer Patrick Cox joined the band in 1989 alongside electric guitarist Günter Haag in 1992, shifting the band's musical style towards rock, pop, schlager, and blues. In 1996, the band removed "Zillertaler" from its name and began to acquire greater success internationally with chart placements for their albums, such as Träume Sind Stärker and Homo Erectus.

The band started recording with Tyrolis Music, a record label specialized in regional music, receiving commercial success with their 1987 album, Sierra Madre. It left Tyrolis Music after releasing their last album with the label, Zillertaler Hochzeitsblues in 1990, and later signed with Ariola Records, releasing albums such as Schürzenjäger '92, Teure Heimat, and Typisch Schürzenjäger. The band's 1996 album, Träume Sind Stärker, followed. It appeared on the top ten of the German albums chart. It released several albums in the 2000s, including Hinter dem Horizont (2004), Weihnachten Miteinander (2005), and Lust auf Mehr (2006).

== Discography ==
=== Studio albums ===
As "Zillertaler Schürzenjäger"

- Die Zillertaler Schürzenjäger (1977)
- Aber heut geht's auf (But today we're off, 1978)
- Grüne Tannen (Green fir trees, 1979)
- Ich habe Dir zu danken (I have to thank you, 1983)
- Ohne Jodeln geht die Zenzi nicht gern schlafen (Without yodelling Zenzi doesn't like to go to sleep, 1983)
- 10 Jahre Zillertaler Schürzenjäger (10 years of Zillertaler Schürzenjäger, 1984)
- Fata Morgana (released under the band name "WAP die Schürzenjäger", 1984)
- Sierra Madre (1987)
- Zillertaler Hochzeitsblues (Zillertal Wedding Blues, 1990)
- Zillertaler Schürzenjäger '92 (1991)
- Teure Heimat (Dear homeland, 1992)
- Typisch Schürzenjäger (Typical Schürzenjäger, 1993)
- A Weihnacht wie's früher war (Christmas as it used to be, 1993)
- Glory-Hallelujah!! (1994)

As "Schürzenjäger"

- Träume sind stärker (Dreams are stronger, 1996)
- Homo erectus (1997)
- 25 Jahre Schürzenjäger (25 years of Schürzenjäger, 1998)
- Es hört nie auf (It never ends, 1999)
- Treff' ma uns in der Mitt'n (Let's meet in the middle, 2001)
- Tu's jetzt! (Do it now!, 2002)
- Hinter dem Horizont (Beyond the horizon, 2004)
- Weihnachten miteinander (Christmas together, 2005)
- Lust auf mehr (Desire for more, 2006)
- Schürzenjäger 2007 - Das Beste zum Abschied (Schürzenjäger 2007 - The Best Of for the farewell, 2007)
- Das Beste vom Besten (The Best of the Best, 2016)
- Herzblut (Heartblood, 2017)

=== Live albums ===
- Live Folge 1 - Finkenberg Mitschnitt (Live Volume 1 - Finkenberg Recording, 1990)
- Live Folge 2 - Finkenberg Mitschnitt (Live Volume 2 - Finkenberg Recording, 1990)
- 20 Jahre Zillertaler Schürzenjäger - Rebellion in den Alpen (20 years of Zillertaler Schürzenjäger - Rebellion in the Alps, 1994) - (Live concert from Vienna during 1993 tour)
- 30 wilde Jahre (30 wild years, 2003)
- Es ist wieder Schürzenjägerzeit (2013)

=== Other ===
- Karaoke (1996)

=== VHS video ===
- Live - Finkenberg Mitschnitt (1990)
- Schürzenjägerzeit (Schürzenjäger Time, 1992) (accompanies Schürzenjäger '92)
- 20 Jahre Zillertaler Schürzenjäger - Rebellion in den Alpen (20 years of Zillertaler Schürzenjäger - Rebellion in the Alps, 1994)
- Träume sind stärker (Dreams are stronger, 1996)
- 25 Jahre Schürzenjäger - Open Air Walchsee '97 (25 years of Schürzenjäger - Open Air Walchsee '97, 1998)
- Draußen in der Heimat (Outdoors at Home, 2001) (accompanies Treff' ma uns in der Mitt'n)
- Tu's jetzt! (Do it now!, 2002) (accompanies Tu's Jetzt!)

=== DVD video ===
- Tu's jetzt! (Do it now!, 2002) (accompanies album Tu's jetzt!)
- 30 wilde Jahre (30 wild years) - (Live concert from Finkenberg during 2003 Tour)
- Hinter dem Horizont - LIVE (Live concert from Cologne during the 2005 Tour)
- Schürzenjäger 2007 - Das Beste zum Abschied (Schürzenjäger 2007 - The Best Of for the farewell - Finkenberg Open Air 2007)

== Awards ==
- 1978: Goldene Musikanten
- 1992: Edelweiß from Frau im Spiegel (Category: Group)
- 1994: Goldenes Ticket
- 1996: Goldene Europa
- 1998: Schlagerdiamant
- 1998: UNHCR Goodwill Ambassador
- 1999: Goldene Stimmgabel
- 2002: Amadeus Austrian Music Award (nominated)
- 2007: Golden roll of honour of Finkenberg
