= H. erectus (disambiguation) =

H. erectus is Homo erectus, a species of human theorized to be the ancestor of Homo sapiens.

H. erectus may also refer to:

- Hippocampus erectus, a species of seahorse
- Hercostomus erectus, a species of the fly genus Hercostomus

== See also ==
- Homo erectus (disambiguation)
- H. erecta (disambiguation)
- H (disambiguation)
- Erectus (disambiguation)
