= Teure Heimat =

Studio album by Zillertaler Schürzenjäger
- Released: 1992
- Genre: Pop, rock, Volksmusik
- Length: 39:28
- Label: BMG Ariola Media GmbH

Zillertaler Schürzenjäger chronology
Zillertaler Schürzenjäger '92 (1991)	Teure Heimat (1992)	Typisch Schürzenjäger (1993)

Teure Heimat (English: Dear Homeland) is a pop/rock album by the Austrian band Zillertaler Schürzenjäger. It was released in 1992 by BMG Ariola Media GmbH.

== Track listing ==
1. "Teure Heimat" ("Dear Homeland") — 2:59
2. "Flensburg" — 2:40
3. "Einfach du" ("Simply You") — 3:00
4. "Großer Manitou" ("Great Manitou") — 5:03
5. "Donnaiolo" — 2:51
6. "Willkommen Europa" ("Welcome, Europe") — 2:54
7. "Alle Sirenen gingen los" ("All Sirens Came On") — 4:36
8. "Im Bergwind Adler spielen" ("To Play Eagle in the Mountain Wind") — 3:15
9. "Davon könnt i leb'n" ("I Could Live From That") — 3:23
10. "I pfeif auf di" — 2:59
11. "Die Bajuwaren" ("The Bavarii") — 2:59
12. "Highway Crew" — 2:49

== Track notes ==
"Teure Heimat" can stand for either Dear homeland or Expensive homeland in the meaning of high taxes etc. Both meanings are mentioned in this song. "Flensburg" describes the loss of the driver's license. The German national database of traffic violators is located in Flensburg.

== Chart performance ==
Chart (1992)	Peak position
Austrian Albums (Ö3 Austria)	3
