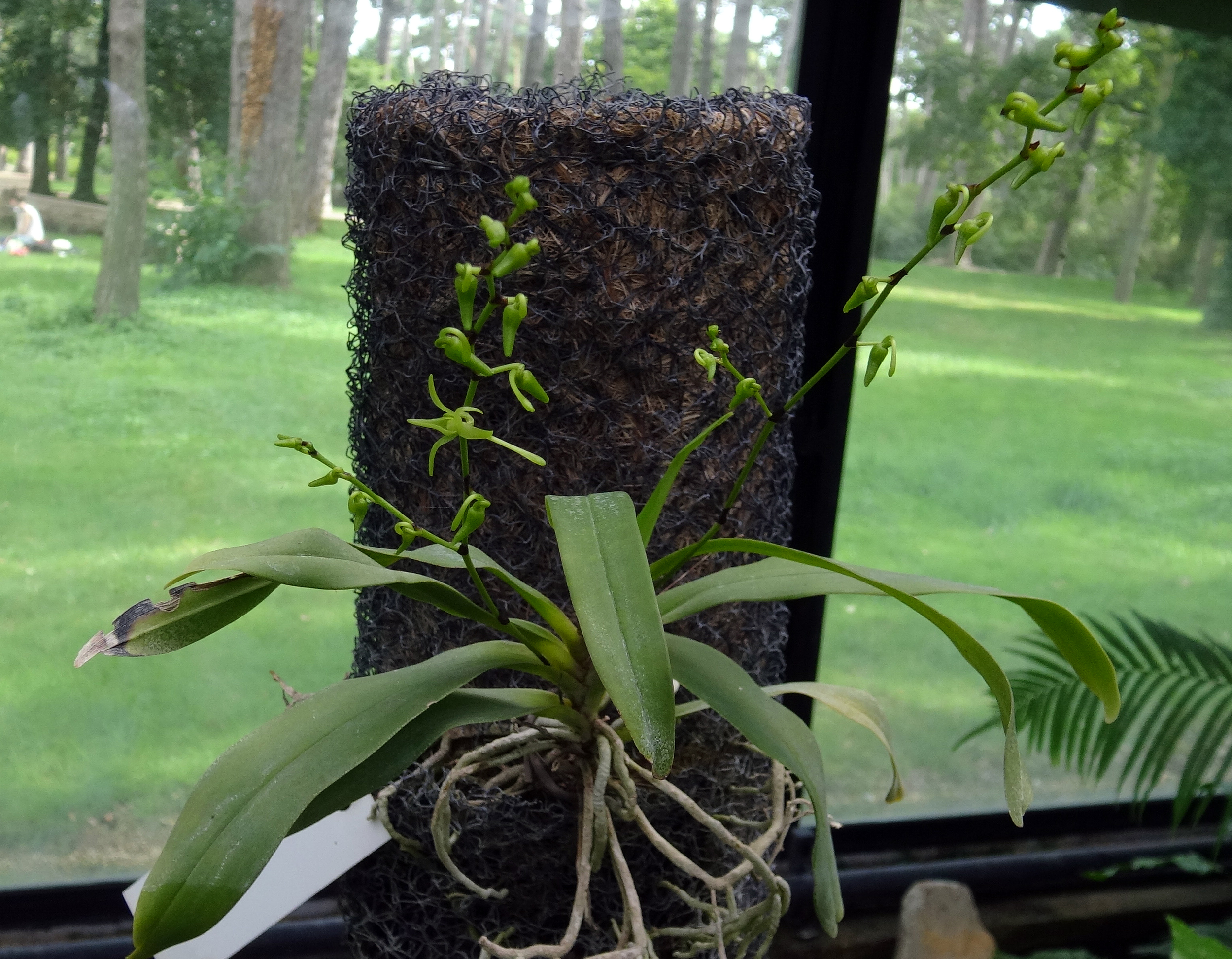

Scientific classification
- Kingdom: Plantae
- Clade: Tracheophytes
- Clade: Angiosperms
- Clade: Monocots
- Order: Asparagales
- Family: Orchidaceae
- Subfamily: Epidendroideae
- Genus: Angraecum
- Species: A. calceolus

Binomial name
- Angraecum calceolus Thouars (1822)

Synonyms
- Angraecum carpophorum Thouars (1822); Angraecum rhopaloceras Schltr. (1925); Aerobion calceolus (Thouars) Spreng. (1826); Aeranthes calceola (Thouars) S. Moore (1877); Epidorchis calceolus (Thouars) Kuntze (1891); Epidorchis carpophora (Thouars) Kuntze (1891); Angraecum paniculatum Frapp. ex Cordem. (1895); Angraecum patens Frapp. ex Cordem. (1895); Mystacidium carpophorum (Thouars) Cordem. (1895); Mystacidium calceolus (Thouars) Cordem. (1895); Angraecum anocentrum Schltr. (1899); Macroplectrum calceolus (Thouars) Finet (1907)

= Angraecum calceolus =

Species of orchid

Angraecum calceolus is a species of orchid.
