= Angraecum lecomtei =

Conservation status
- Vulnerable (IUCN 3.1)
- CITES Appendix II

Scientific classification
- Kingdom: Plantae
- Clade: Embryophytes
- Clade: Tracheophytes
- Clade: Angiosperms
- Clade: Monocots
- Order: Asparagales
- Family: Orchidaceae
- Subfamily: Epidendroideae
- Genus: Angraecum
- Species: A. lecomtei

Binomial name
- Angraecum lecomtei H.Perrier (1938)

Species of orchid

Angraecum lecomtei is a species of orchid native to Madagascar.
