= Angraecum pyriforme =

Conservation status
- Vulnerable (IUCN 3.1)

Scientific classification
- Kingdom: Plantae
- Clade: Tracheophytes
- Clade: Angiosperms
- Clade: Monocots
- Order: Asparagales
- Family: Orchidaceae
- Subfamily: Epidendroideae
- Genus: Angraecum
- Species: A. pyriforme

Binomial name
- Angraecum pyriforme Summerh.

Species of orchid

Angraecum pyriforme is a species of plant in the family Orchidaceae. It is found in western tropical Africa, to be precise in Cameroon, Ivory Coast, and Nigeria. Its natural habitat is subtropical or tropical moist montane forests. It is threatened by habitat loss.
