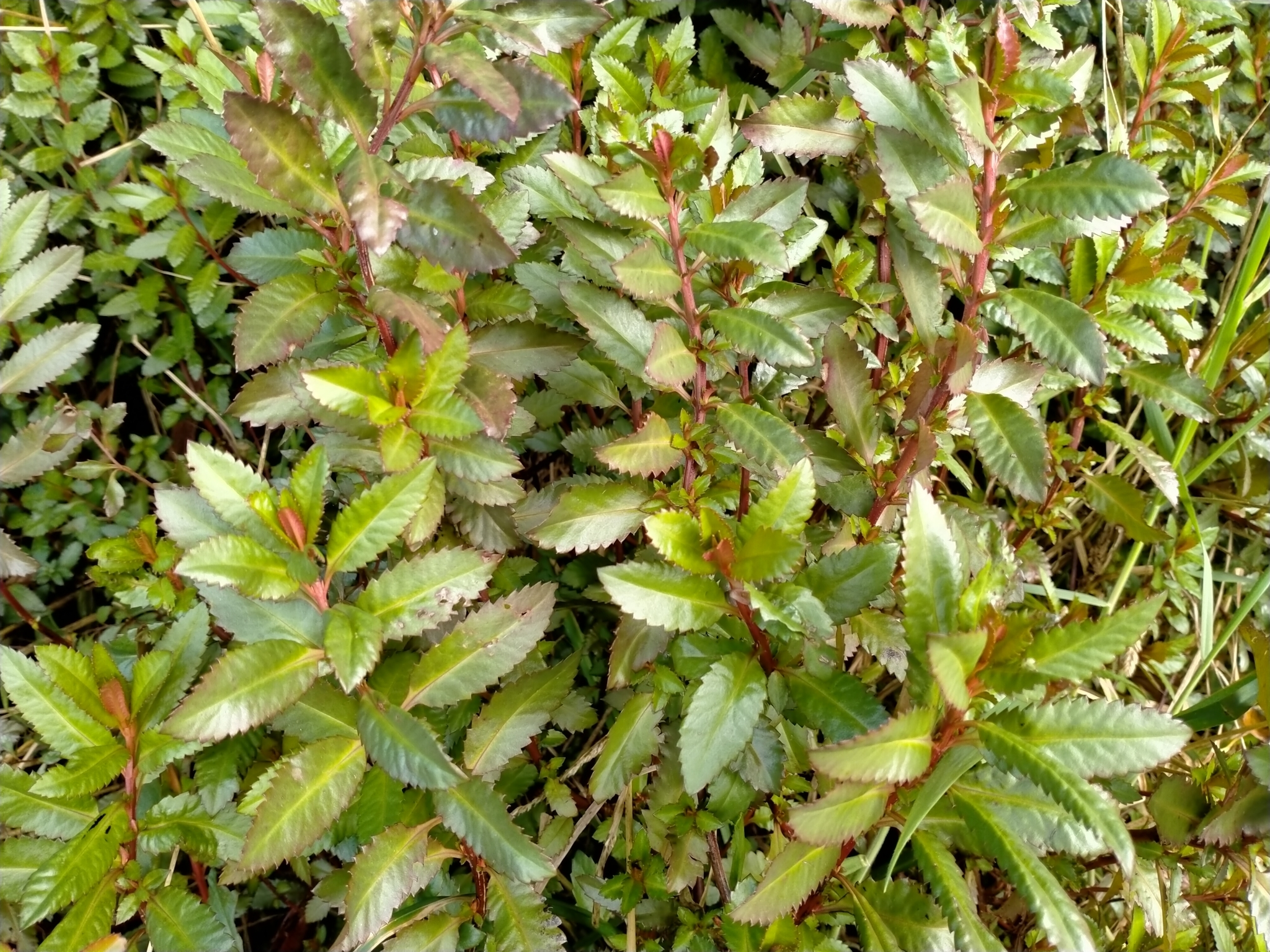

Scientific classification
- Kingdom: Plantae
- Clade: Tracheophytes
- Clade: Angiosperms
- Clade: Eudicots
- Order: Saxifragales
- Family: Haloragaceae
- Genus: Haloragis
- Species: H. erecta

Binomial name
- Haloragis erecta (Banks ex Murray) Oken

= Haloragis erecta =

Species of flowering plant

Haloragis erecta, the shrubby haloragis, toatoa, fireweed or erect seaberry, is a plant species that is endemic to New Zealand. It is a non-threatened perennial herb found throughout New Zealand up to an altitude of around 500m above sea level. The leaves are opposite and coarsely toothed. The stems are square and reddish/maroon in colour and flowers throughout the year producing red, pink and yellow flowers.

== Description ==
The toatoa grows stems up to one metre tall, branching out openly. Its stems are easily recognisable due to their red colouration. It has an opposite leaf arrangement, small petiole and leaves that grow up to 90mm. Along with the red stems, its most notable feature is its leaves with serrations of up to 4mm on the edge of each of its leaves. The leaf shape is elliptic and has lateral veins running throughout the leaf. When flowering from December through until February, the toatoa boasts up to 3 to 7 flowers on each branch. These flowers can range in colour from pinky reds to vibrant yellows with petals up to 10 mm during fruiting and small pinkish fruit that can be up to 4 mm in diameter.

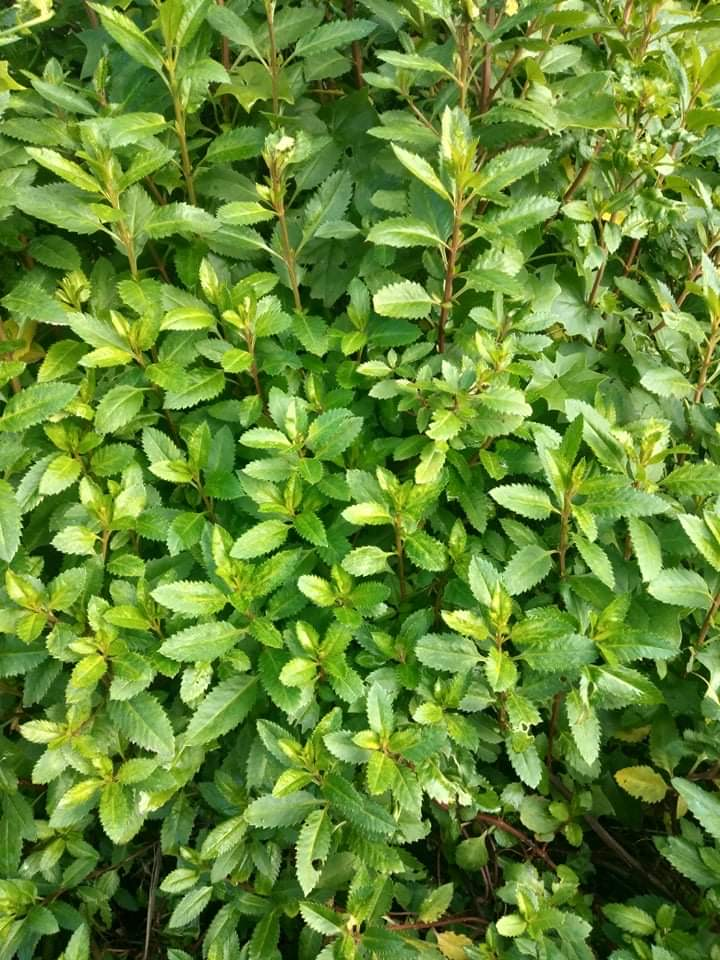
Haloragis erecta, Mangamaunu, Kaikoura, New Zealand (2022)

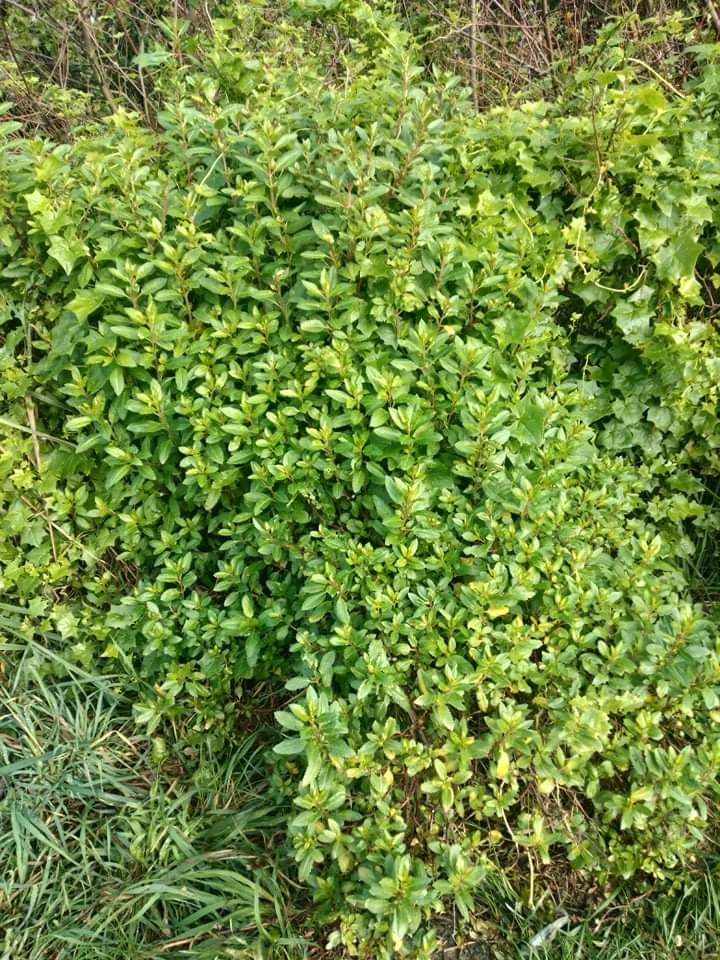
Haloragis erecta, Mangamaunu, Kaikoura, New Zealand (2022)

== Distribution ==
The toatoa is found anywhere from sea level up until an altitude of to 500 m in altitude. It is found all throughout New Zealand, it thrives in fertile soil and colonies areas that have been subject to disturbance events such as forestation/land clearance such as slip scars as well as forest fires. It can also self propagate causing it to occasionally be seen as a weed within urban areas. Worldwide, it is found within The United States of America, French Polynesia and the United Kingdom and were taken over to these areas in the 1800s.

== Life cycle ==
The toatoa has a perennial life cycle, which means that the plant grows each year and has an annual flowering and fruiting schedule. Each year the plant produces flowers which are then pollinated by various moths and butterflies. It then grows a small fruit that eventually falls off and is dispersed by wind. The seeds then lay dormant until the surrounding area is disturbed or there is a lack of cover above then the seed sprouts and grows into the plant, the cycle then continues.

== Interactions ==
Toatoa prefer more fertile and nutrient-rich soils such as areas after wildfire as well as freshly cleared ground such as landslides and other open soils as they are among the first species to colonise an area, however, they can tolerate low nutrient soils and dryer conditions, allowing them to be a very resilient and successful plant. They are host to many species of moths, beetles, mites, thrips and sucking bugs, a full list of which can be found here: https://plant-synz.landcareresearch.co.nz/ReportForm.aspx?RecordId=231&Type=P&SortBy=Alpha&Biostatus=a,c,e,n. These insects all carry out specific roles such as pollination as well as predation and living on the host, providing habitat and sustenance for many of these insects. It also has its own species of weevil, the haloragis weevil which is only known to live on the toatoa that feed on the woody tissue and spend their entire life and reproductive cycle on and within the plant.

== Further information ==
The toatoa is often sold as a garden plant and seeds have been transported overseas as an exotic garden plant as it stands out due to its uncommon characteristics such as its red flowers, fruits and stems as well as its serrated leaves causing its popularity.
