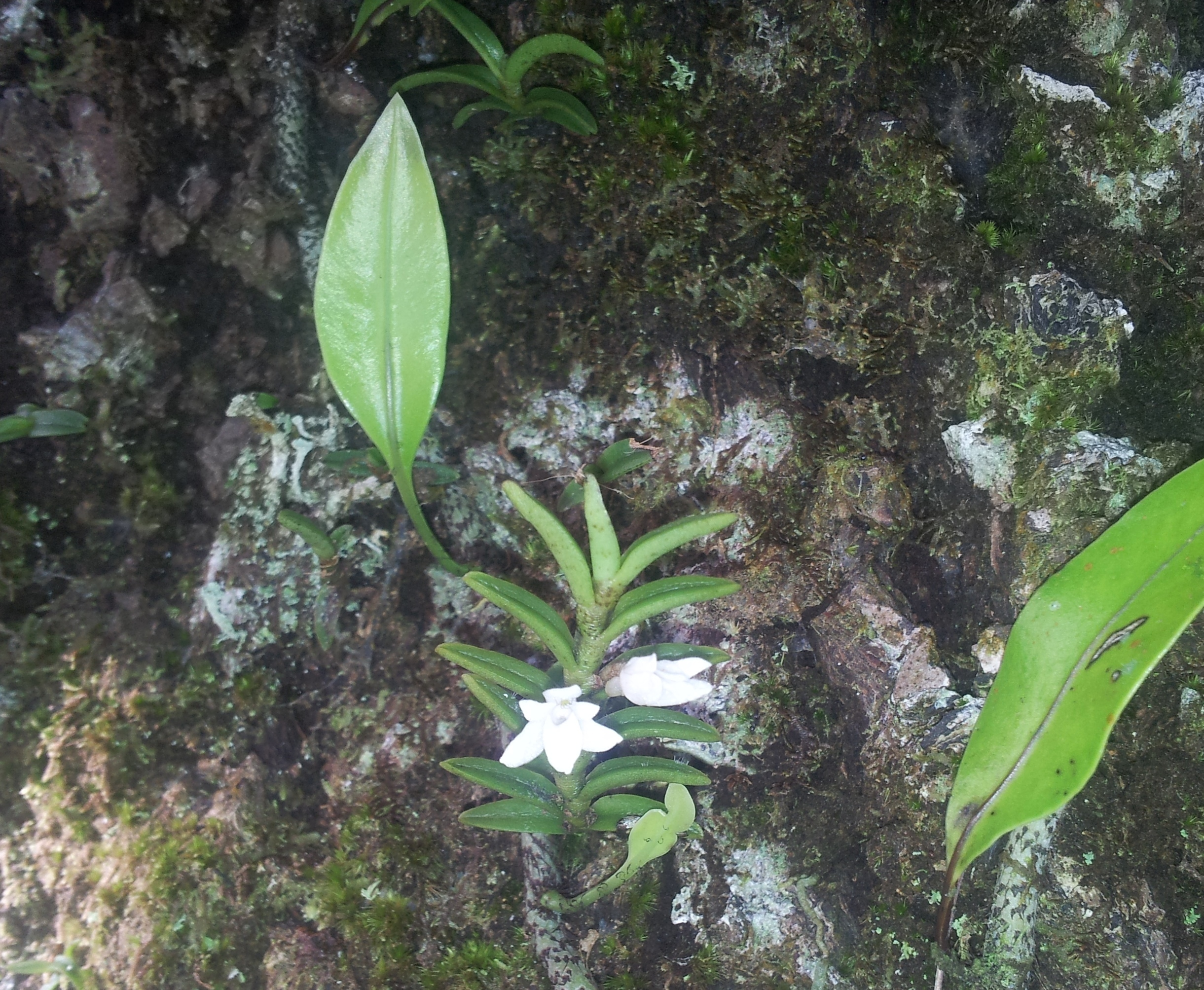

Scientific classification
- Kingdom: Plantae
- Clade: Tracheophytes
- Clade: Angiosperms
- Clade: Monocots
- Order: Asparagales
- Family: Orchidaceae
- Subfamily: Epidendroideae
- Genus: Angraecum
- Species: A. pectinatum

Binomial name
- Angraecum pectinatum Thouars (1822)

= Angraecum pectinatum =

Species of orchid

Angraecum pectinatum is a species of orchid native to Madagascar, Mauritius, Réunion, and Comoros.
