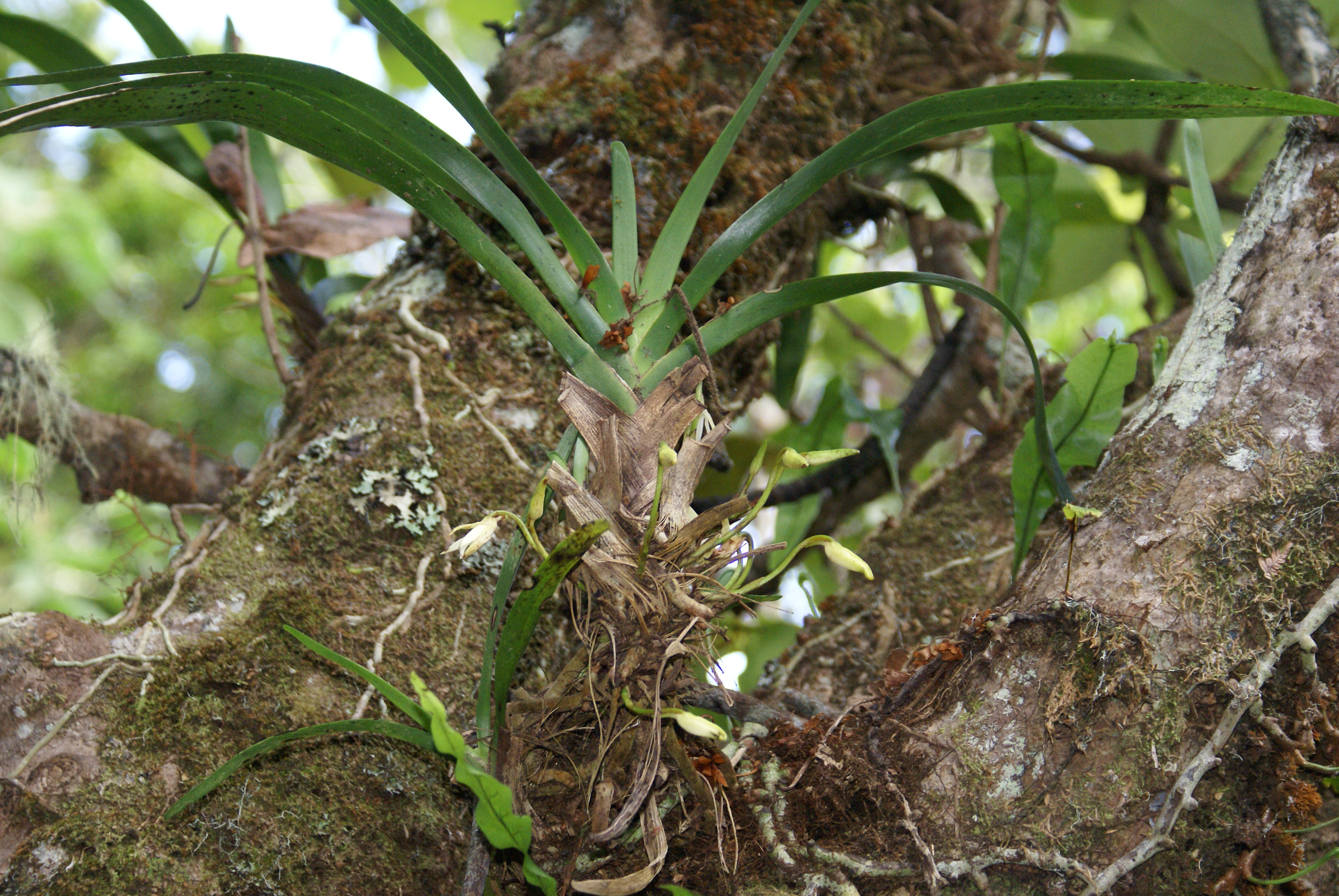

Scientific classification
- Kingdom: Plantae
- Clade: Tracheophytes
- Clade: Angiosperms
- Clade: Monocots
- Order: Asparagales
- Family: Orchidaceae
- Subfamily: Epidendroideae
- Genus: Angraecum
- Species: A. borbonicum

Binomial name
- Angraecum borbonicum Bosser (1988)

= Angraecum borbonicum =

Species of orchid

Angraecum borbonicum is a species of orchid found in Réunion.
