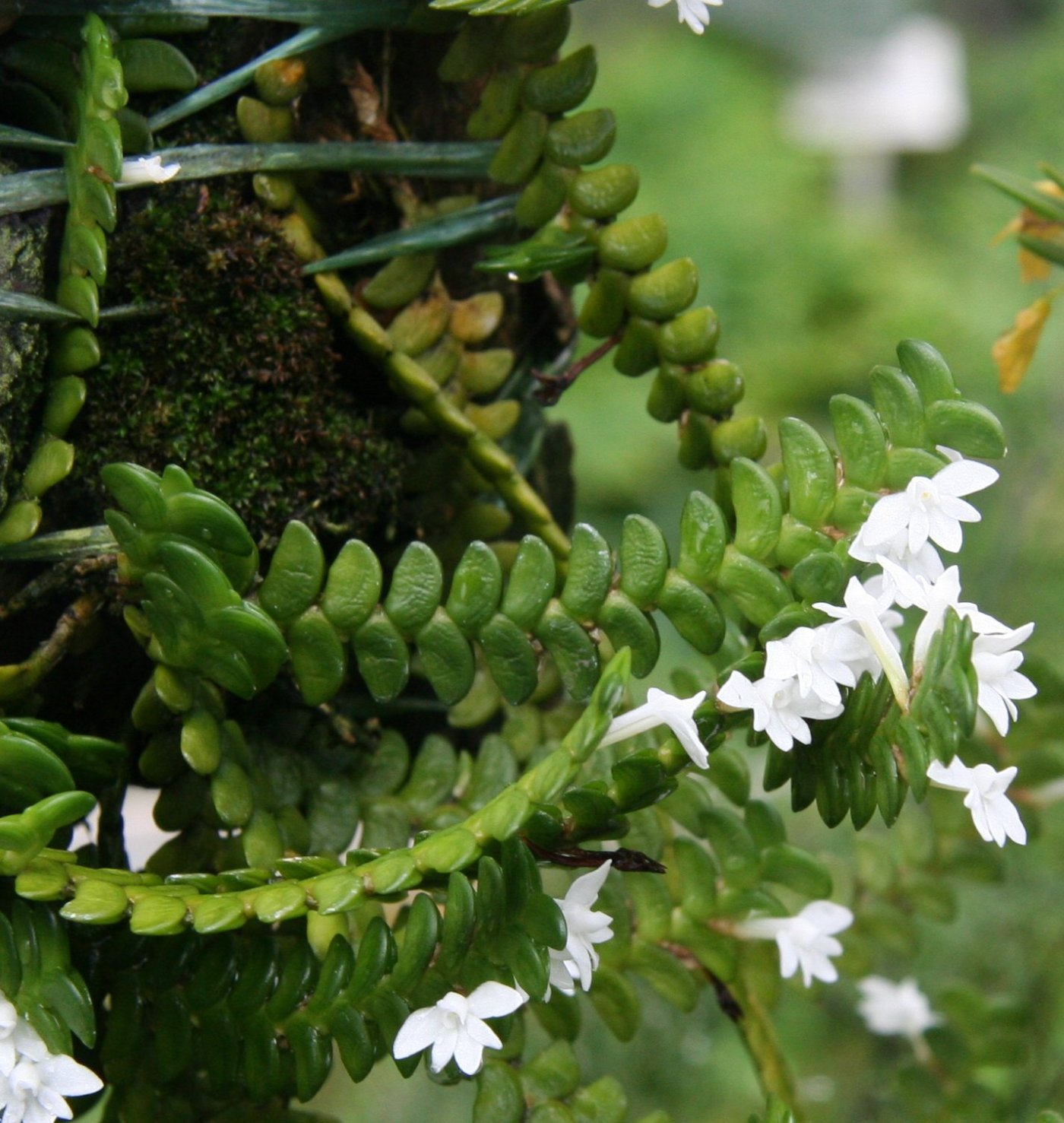

Conservation status
- Least Concern (IUCN 3.1)

Scientific classification
- Kingdom: Plantae
- Clade: Tracheophytes
- Clade: Angiosperms
- Clade: Monocots
- Order: Asparagales
- Family: Orchidaceae
- Subfamily: Epidendroideae
- Genus: Angraecum
- Species: A. distichum

Binomial name
- Angraecum distichum Lindl., 1836

Synonyms
- Limodorum imbricatum Sw., 1805; Aeranthes disticha (Lindl.) Rchb.f., 1864; Mystacidium distichum (Lindl.) Pfitzer, 1889; Epidorchis disticha (Lindl.) Kuntze, 1891; Macroplectrum distichum (Lindl.) Finet, 1907; Angraecum imbricatum (Sw.) Schltr., 1918; Angraecum poppendickianum Szlach. & Olszewski, 2001; Dolabrifolia disticha (Lindl.) Szlach. & Romowicz (2007); Macroplectrum distichum (Lindl.) Finet (1907); Dolabrifolia poppendickiana (Szlach. & Olszewski) Szlach. & Romowicz (2007)

= Angraecum distichum =

Species of orchid

Angraecum distichum is a species of comet orchid that is found across sub-Saharan and tropical Africa.

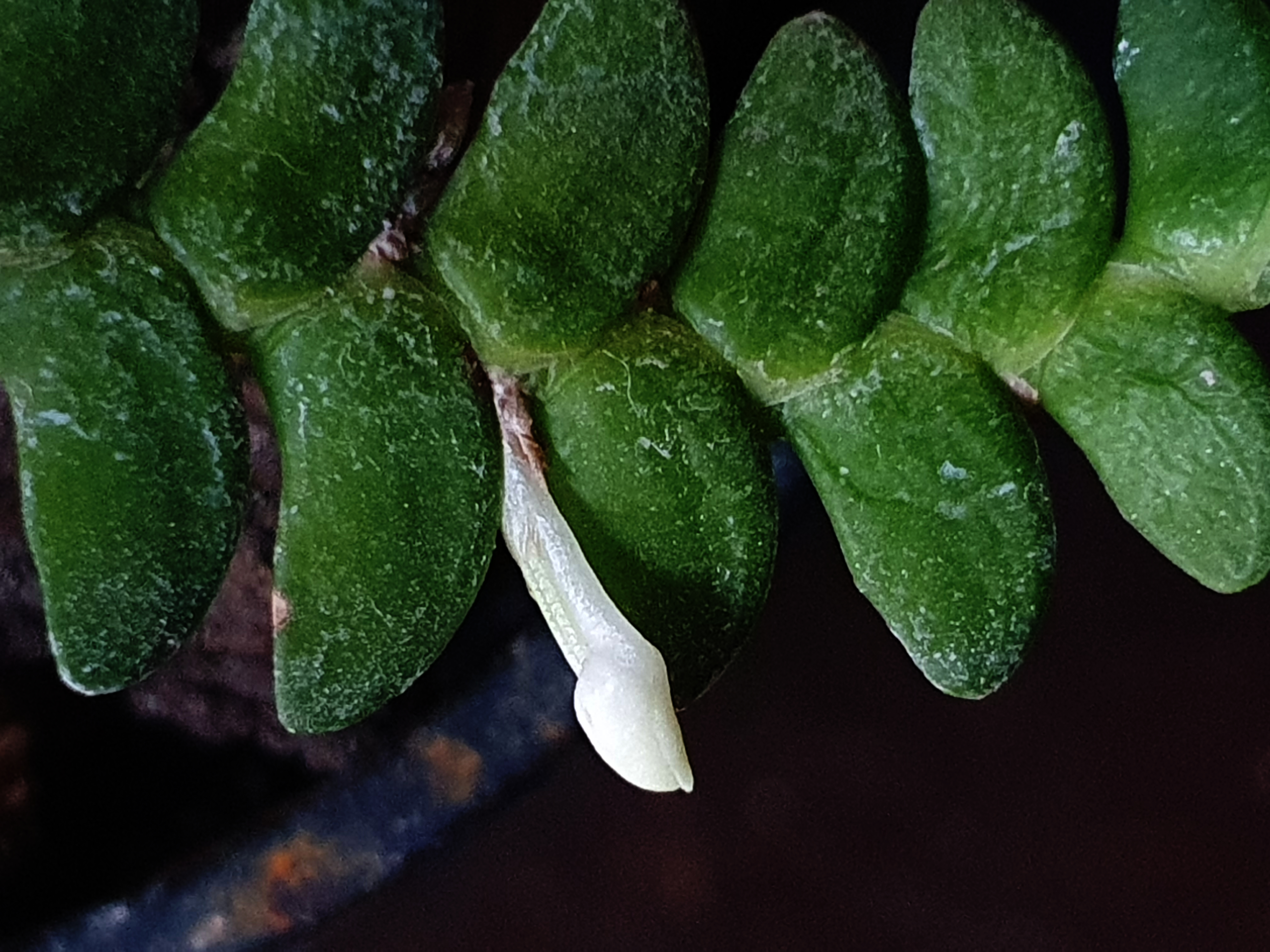
Angraecum distichum Lindl. flower bud

== Ecology ==
It can be found growing on the phorophytes Klainedoxa gabonensis, Gilbertiodendron dewevrei, Mangifera indica and in cocoa plantations. It can also occur with Calamus, Uapaca heudelotii and Irvingia smithii, and in the undergrowth with Marantaceae and Zingiberaceae.
