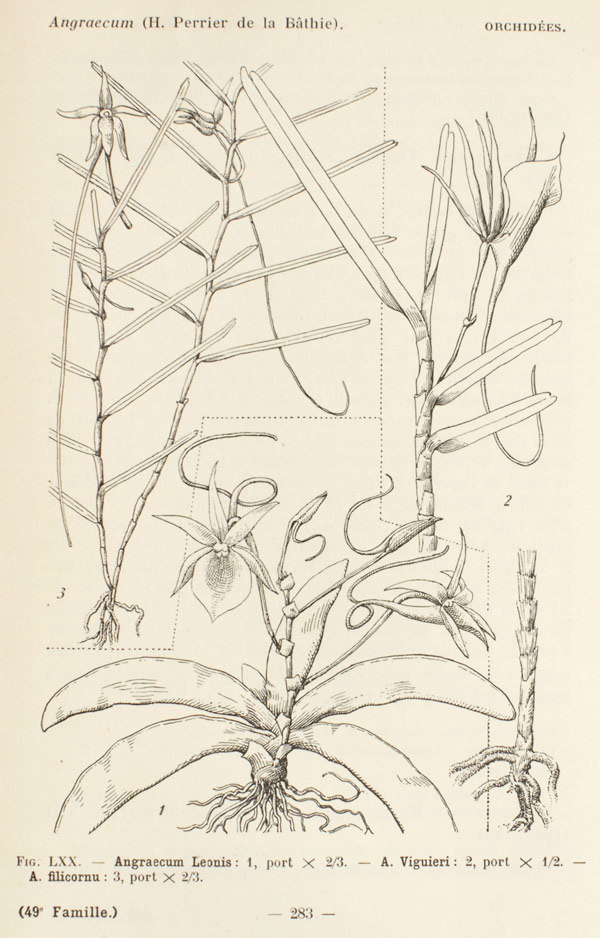

Conservation status
- Vulnerable (IUCN 3.1)

Scientific classification
- Kingdom: Plantae
- Clade: Tracheophytes
- Clade: Angiosperms
- Clade: Monocots
- Order: Asparagales
- Family: Orchidaceae
- Subfamily: Epidendroideae
- Genus: Angraecum
- Species: A. filicornu

Binomial name
- Angraecum filicornu Thouars (1822)

Synonyms
- Aerobion filicornu (Thouars) Spreng. (1826); Aeranthes thouarsii S. Moore (1877)

= Angraecum filicornu =

Species of orchid

Angraecum filicornu is a species of orchid.
