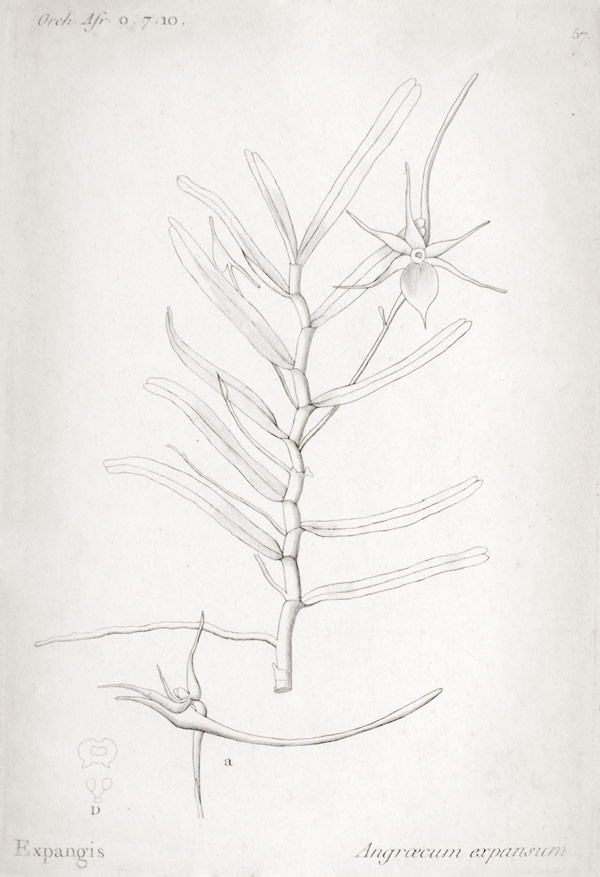

Scientific classification
- Kingdom: Plantae
- Clade: Tracheophytes
- Clade: Angiosperms
- Clade: Monocots
- Order: Asparagales
- Family: Orchidaceae
- Subfamily: Epidendroideae
- Genus: Angraecum
- Species: A. expansum

Binomial name
- Angraecum expansum Thouars (1822)

Synonyms
- Aerobion expansum (Thouars) Spreng. (1826); Aeranthes expansa (Thouars) S. Moore (1877); Epidorchis expansa (Thouars) Kuntze (1891)

= Angraecum expansum =

Species of orchid

Angraecum expansum is a species of orchid found in Réunion.
