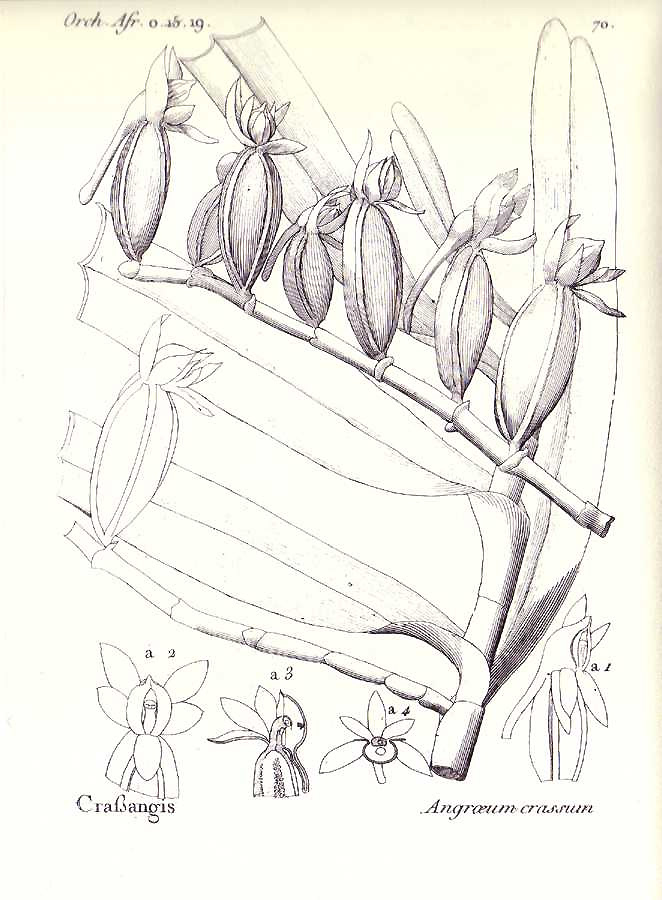

Scientific classification
- Kingdom: Plantae
- Clade: Tracheophytes
- Clade: Angiosperms
- Clade: Monocots
- Order: Asparagales
- Family: Orchidaceae
- Subfamily: Epidendroideae
- Genus: Angraecum
- Species: A. crassum

Binomial name
- Angraecum crassum Thouars (1822)

Synonyms
- Aerobion crassum (Thouars) Spreng. (1826); Angorchis crassa (Thouars) Kuntze (1891); Angraecum sarcodanthum Schltr. (1918); Angraecum crassiflorum H. Perrier (1938)

= Angraecum crassum =

Species of orchid

Angraecum crassum is a species of orchid.
