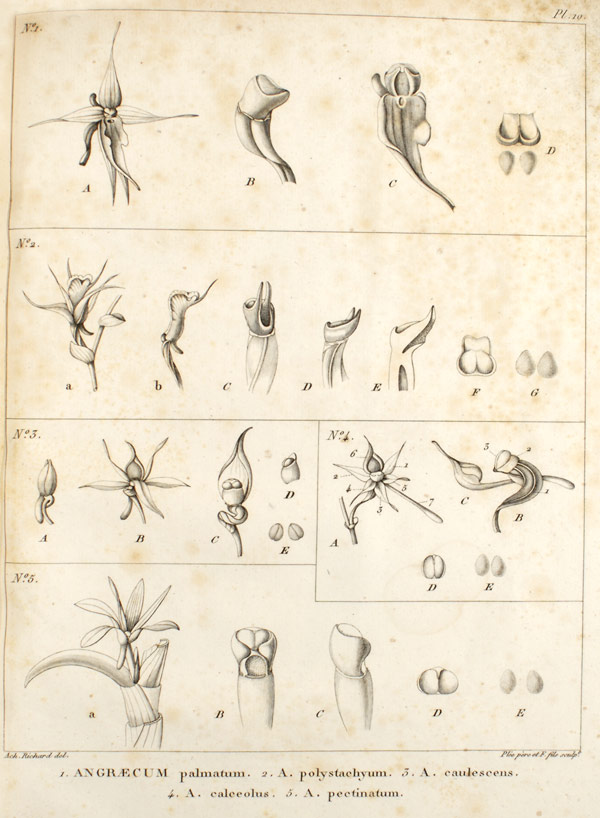
- Angraecum caulescens is depicted on the third row down, in the box on the left. The drawing is by Achille Richard.

Scientific classification
- Kingdom: Plantae
- Clade: Tracheophytes
- Clade: Angiosperms
- Clade: Monocots
- Order: Asparagales
- Family: Orchidaceae
- Subfamily: Epidendroideae
- Genus: Angraecum
- Species: A. caulescens

Binomial name
- Angraecum caulescens Thouars (1822)

Synonyms
- Aerobion caulescens (Thouars) Spreng. (1826); Mystacidium caulescens (Thouars) Ridl. (1885); Epidorchis caulescens (Thouars) Kuntze (1891)

= Angraecum caulescens =

Species of orchid

Angraecum caulescens is a species of orchid.
