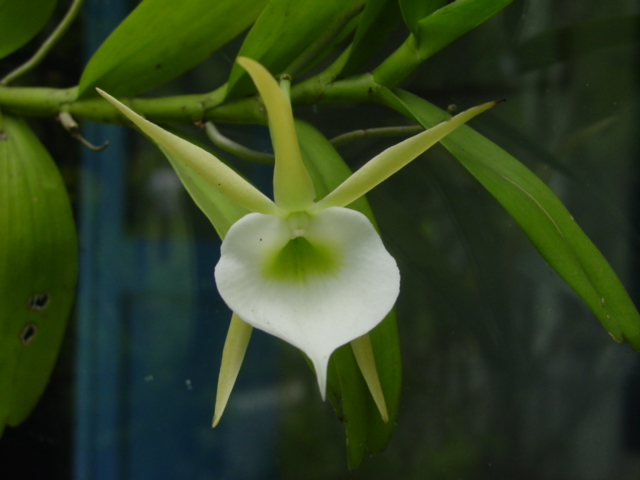

Scientific classification
- Kingdom: Plantae
- Clade: Embryophytes
- Clade: Tracheophytes
- Clade: Angiosperms
- Clade: Monocots
- Order: Asparagales
- Family: Orchidaceae
- Subfamily: Epidendroideae
- Genus: Angraecum
- Species: A. infundibulare

Binomial name
- Angraecum infundibulare Lindl. (1862)

Synonyms
- Angorchis infundubularis (Lindl.) Kuntze (1891); Mystacidium infundibulare (Lindl.) Rolfe (1897)

= Angraecum infundibulare =

Species of orchid

Angraecum infundibulare is a species of orchid.
