= Angraecum rhynchoglossum =

Conservation status
- Endangered (IUCN 3.1)

Scientific classification
- Kingdom: Plantae
- Clade: Tracheophytes
- Clade: Angiosperms
- Clade: Monocots
- Order: Asparagales
- Family: Orchidaceae
- Subfamily: Epidendroideae
- Genus: Angraecum
- Species: A. rhynchoglossum

Binomial name
- Angraecum rhynchoglossum Schltr.(1925)

Species of orchid

Angraecum rhynchoglossum is a species of orchid native to Madagascar.
