= Angraecum penzigianum =

Conservation status
- Near Threatened (IUCN 3.1)

Scientific classification
- Kingdom: Plantae
- Clade: Tracheophytes
- Clade: Angiosperms
- Clade: Monocots
- Order: Asparagales
- Family: Orchidaceae
- Subfamily: Epidendroideae
- Genus: Angraecum
- Species: A. penzigianum

Binomial name
- Angraecum penzigianum Schltr.

Species of orchid

Angraecum penzigianum is a species of comet orchid that is endemic to Madagascar, and is recorded from Antsiranana, Fianarantsoa and Toamasina provinces, from elevations of 1,000–2,000 m. It is an epiphytic perennial which grows in mossy forests. However, it was previously thought to be endemic to the Andringitra Massif. It is threatened by slash-and-burn cultivation, cattle grazing, charcoal production and bush fires.
