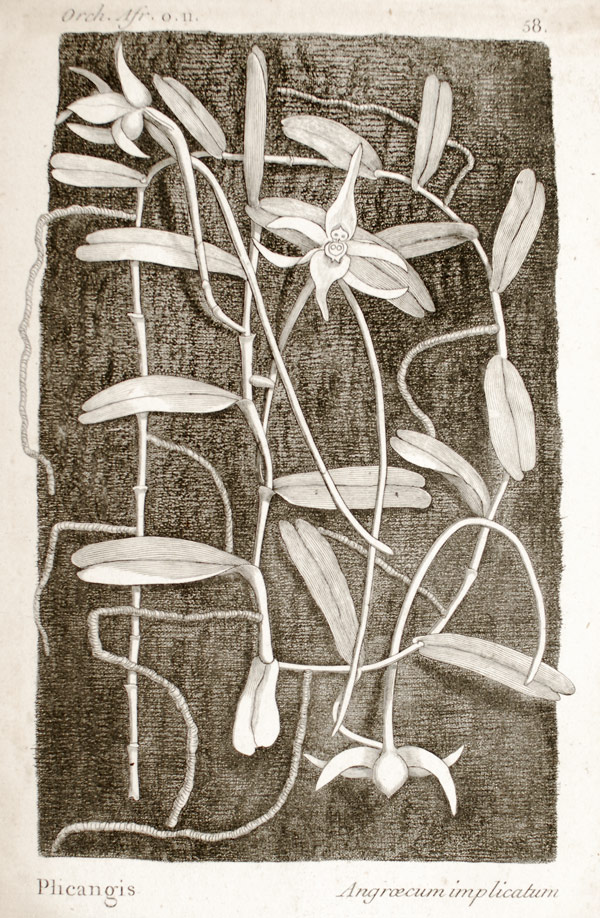

Scientific classification
- Kingdom: Plantae
- Clade: Tracheophytes
- Clade: Angiosperms
- Clade: Monocots
- Order: Asparagales
- Family: Orchidaceae
- Subfamily: Epidendroideae
- Genus: Angraecum
- Species: A. implicatum

Binomial name
- Angraecum implicatum Hook.f. (1889)

Synonyms
- Aerobion implicatum (Thouars) Spreng. (1826); Angorchis implicata (Thouars) Kuntze (1891); Angraecum verruculosum Frapp. ex Cordem. (1895); Macroplectrum implicatum (Thouars) Finet (1907)

= Angraecum implicatum =

Species of orchid

Angraecum implicatum is a species of orchid found in Réunion and Madagascar.
