= Angraecum bancoense =

Conservation status
- Least Concern (IUCN 3.1)

Scientific classification
- Kingdom: Plantae
- Clade: Tracheophytes
- Clade: Angiosperms
- Clade: Monocots
- Order: Asparagales
- Family: Orchidaceae
- Subfamily: Epidendroideae
- Genus: Angraecum
- Species: A. bancoense

Binomial name
- Angraecum bancoense Burg

Species of orchid

Angraecum bancoense is a species of comet orchid that can be found in Cameroon, the Central African Republic, the Republic of the Congo, the Democratic Republic of the Congo, Equatorial Guinea, Gabon, Ghana, Guinea, Liberia, Nigeria, Rwanda, São Tomé and Principe and Sierra Leone. It can be found with Calamus, on Lophira alata, Macrolebium or Blighia welwitschii.
