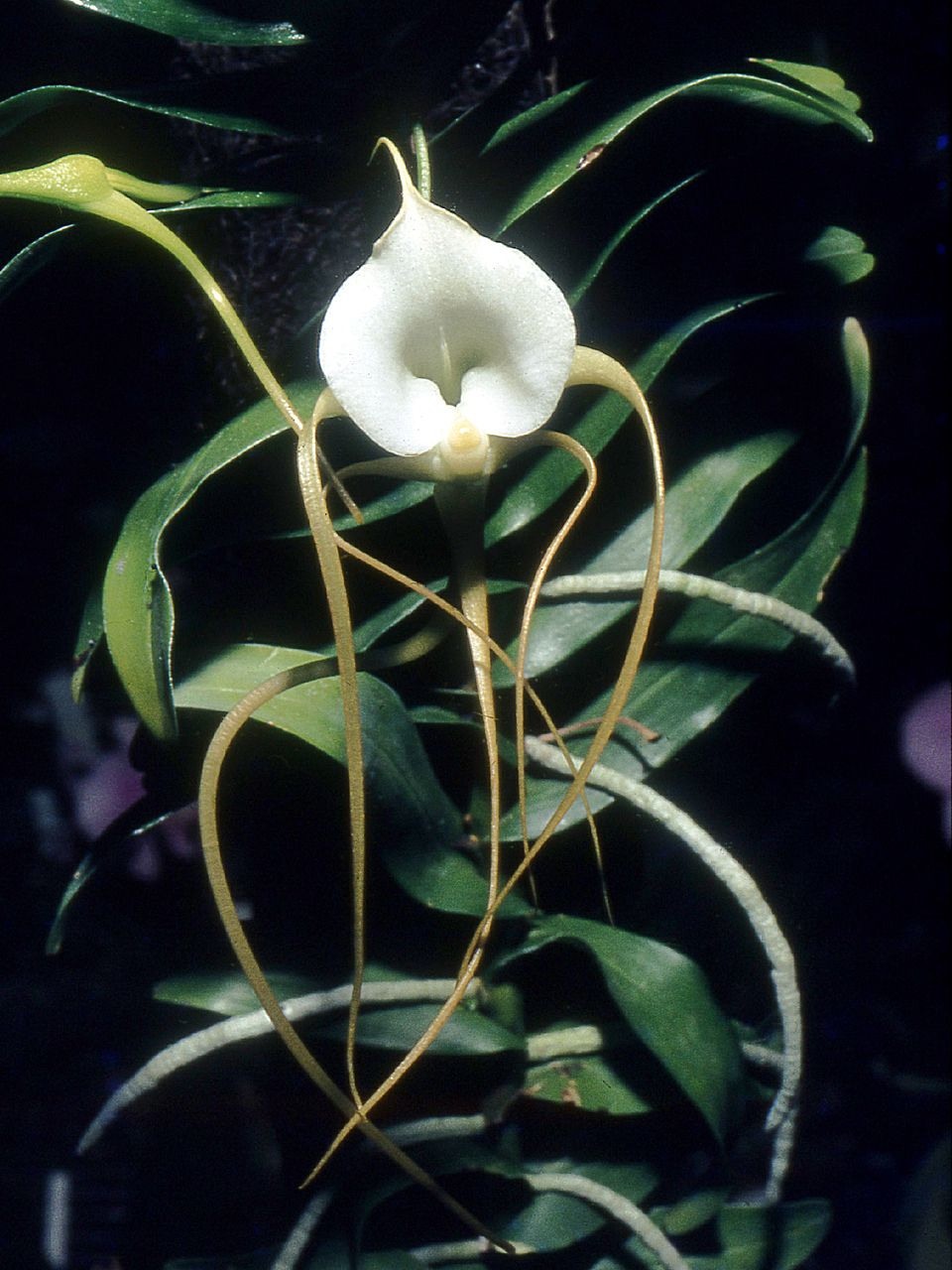

Scientific classification
- Kingdom: Plantae
- Clade: Tracheophytes
- Clade: Angiosperms
- Clade: Monocots
- Order: Asparagales
- Family: Orchidaceae
- Subfamily: Epidendroideae
- Genus: Angraecum
- Species: A. ramosum

Binomial name
- Angraecum ramosum Thouars (1822)

Synonyms
- Angorchis ramosa (Thouars) Kuntze (1891); Macroplectrum ramosum (Thouars) Finet (1907)

= Angraecum ramosum =

Species of orchid

Angraecum ramosum is a small, caulescent species of orchid, native to Mauritius and Réunion.
