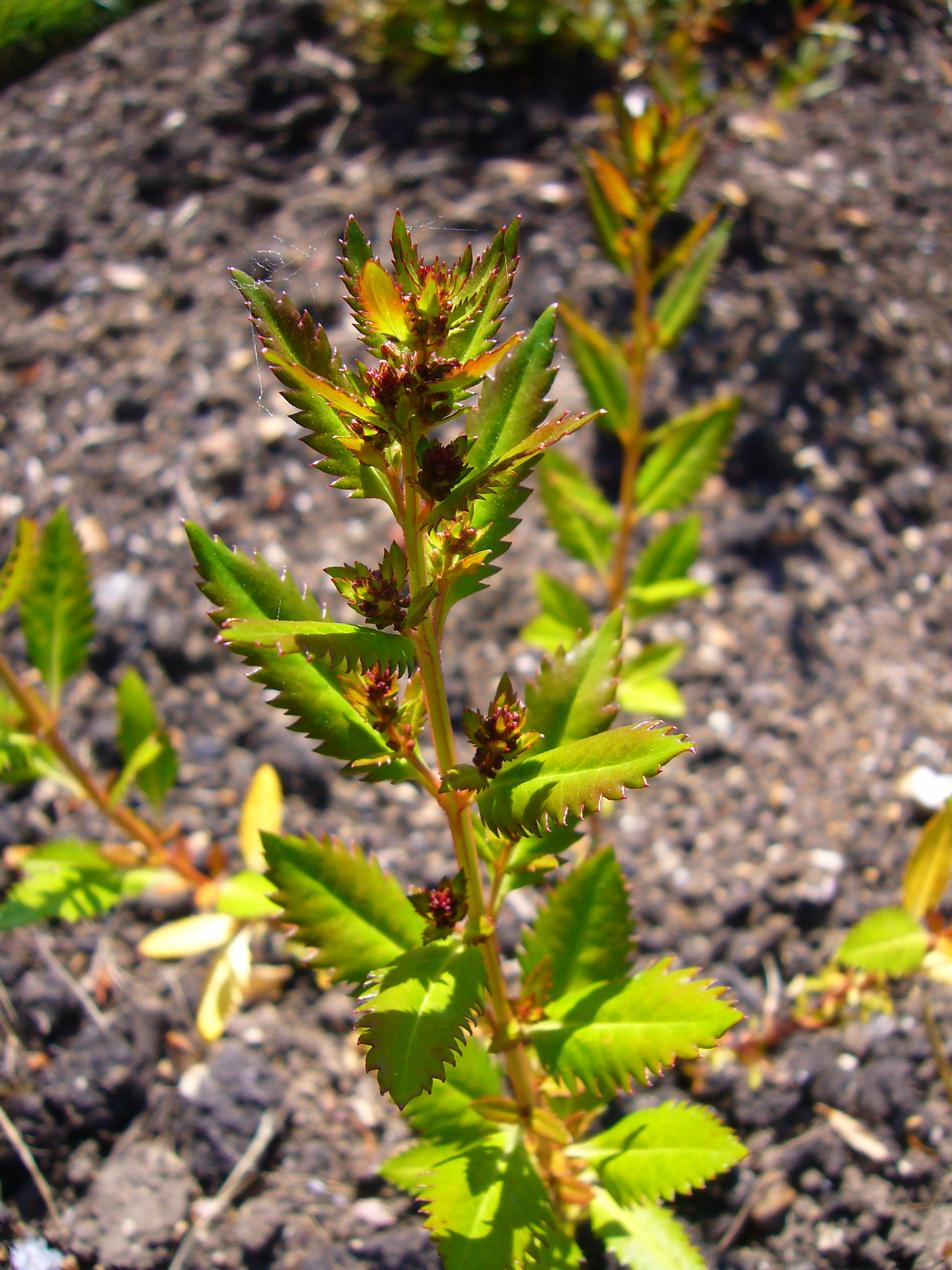
- Haloragis erecta

Scientific classification
- Kingdom: Plantae
- Clade: Tracheophytes
- Clade: Angiosperms
- Clade: Eudicots
- Order: Saxifragales
- Family: Haloragaceae
- Genus: Haloragis; J.R.Forst & G.Forst

Type species
- Haloragis prostrata J.R.Forst & G.Forst

Species
- ~28, see text

Synonyms
- Meionectes (R.Br.) Schindl.

= Haloragis =

Genus of flower

Haloragis is a genus of flowering plants in the family Haloragaceae. Some species are known commonly as seaberry and most are native to the southern hemisphere. They are annual or perennial herbs to small shrubs, and many are terrestrial wetland plants.

== Taxonomy ==
The genus Haloragis includes 29 accepted species:

- Haloragis aculeolata Benth.
- Haloragis acutangula F.Muell.
- Haloragis aspera Lindl.
- Haloragis digyna Labill.
- Haloragis dura Orchard
- Haloragis eichleri Orchard
- Haloragis erecta (Murray) Oken
- Haloragis exalata F.Muell.
- Haloragis eyreana Orchard
- Haloragis foliosa Benth.
- Haloragis glauca Lindl.
- Haloragis gossei F.Muell.
- Haloragis hamata Orchard
- Haloragis heterophylla Brongn.
- Haloragis luminosa Wege & Orchard
- Haloragis maierae Orchard
- Haloragis masafuerana Skottsb.
- Haloragis masatierrana Skottsb.
- Haloragis milesiae Peter G.Wilson & Makinson
- Haloragis myriocarpa Orchard
- Haloragis odontocarpa F.Muell.
- Haloragis platycarpa Benth.
- Haloragis prostrata J.R.Forst. & G.Forst.
- Haloragis scoparia Fenzl
- Haloragis serra Brongn.
- Haloragis stokesii F.Br.
- Haloragis stricta R.Br. ex Benth.
- Haloragis trigonocarpa F.Muell.
- Haloragis uncatipila Orchard

A number of species, previously placed here, have subsequently been placed in other related genera, including:

- Haloragis micrantha (Thunb.) R.Br. ex Sieb. & Zucc. (syn. Gonocarpus micranthus Thunb.)

=== Etymology ===
The name is derived from two Greek words, ἅλς - hals (sea or salt) and ῥάξ - rax (grape-berry). This refers to the first discovered species being found on beaches and having globular fruit.

== Distribution and habitat ==
Of the 28 species, 23 are endemic to Australia and the remainder to the South Pacific (Tuvalu, New Caledonia, New Zealand, the Cook Islands, Rapa Nui and the Juan Fernandez Islands, e.g. H. prostrata (Cook Islands).

== Cultivation ==
Some cultivars are valued as ornamentals, e.g. 'Wanganui Bronze', 'Wellington Bronze'.

== Bibliography ==
- Christenhusz, Maarten J. M.; Fay, Michael F.; Chase, Mark W. (2017). "Saxifragales". Plants of the World: An Illustrated Encyclopedia of Vascular Plants. University of Chicago Press. pp. 231–244. ISBN 978-0-226-52292-0.
- Les, Donald H. (2017). Aquatic Dicotyledons of North America: Ecology, Life History, and Systematics. CRC Press. ISBN 978-1-351-64440-2.
- Moody, Michael L.; Les, Donald H. (2007). "Phylogenetic Systematics and Character Evolution in the Angiosperm Family Haloragaceae" (PDF). American Journal of Botany. 94 (12): 2005–2025. doi:10.3732/ajb.94.12.2005. ISSN 0002-9122. JSTOR 27733378. PMID 21636395.
- Orchard, A. E. (1979). "Myriophyllum (Haloragaceae) in Australasia. I. New Zealand: A Revision of the Genus and a Synopsis of the Family". Brunonia. 2: 247–287. CiteSeerX 10.1.1.492.3964. doi:10.1071/bru9850173.
- WFO (2019). "Haloragis J.R. Forst. & G. Forst". World Flora Online.
- POWO (2019). "Haloragis J.R.Forst. & G.Forst". Plants of the World Online. Royal Botanic Gardens, Kew.
- Orchard, A E (1990). "Haloragis". Flora of Australia Online vol.18. ABRS.
