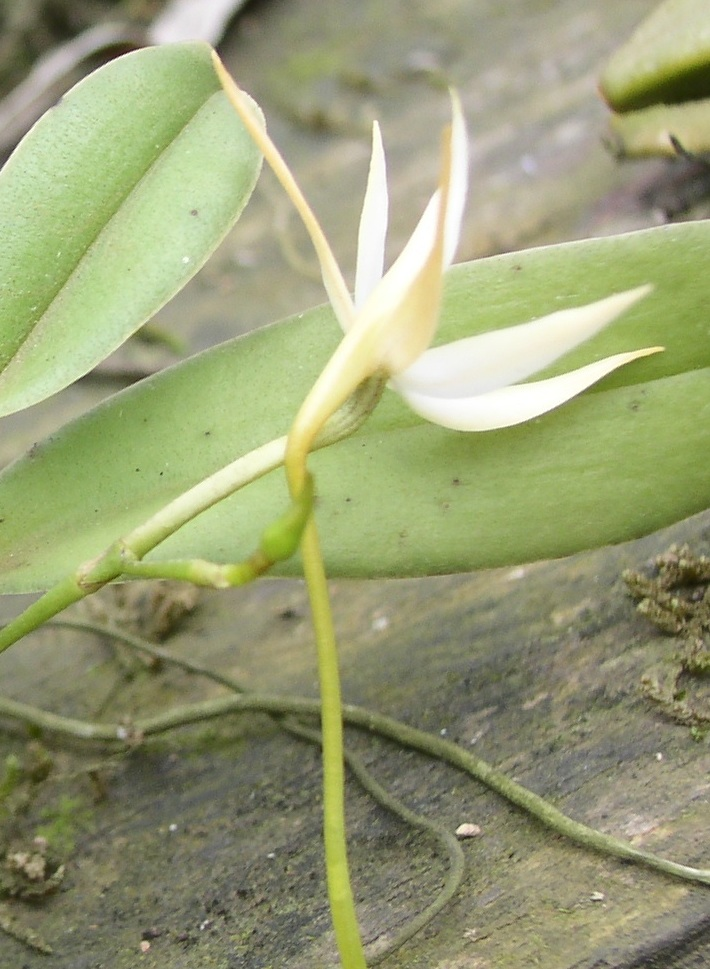

Conservation status
- Endangered (IUCN 3.1)

Scientific classification
- Kingdom: Plantae
- Clade: Tracheophytes
- Clade: Angiosperms
- Clade: Monocots
- Order: Asparagales
- Family: Orchidaceae
- Subfamily: Epidendroideae
- Genus: Angraecum
- Species: A. sanfordii

Binomial name
- Angraecum sanfordii P.J.Cribb & B.J.Pollard

= Angraecum sanfordii =

Species of orchid

Angraecum sanfordii is a species of plant in the family Orchidaceae. It is endemic to Cameroon, where it occurs on Mount Kupe and Mount Cameroon. It grows in submontane and montane habitat types. It is an epiphyte. It is threatened by habitat loss.
