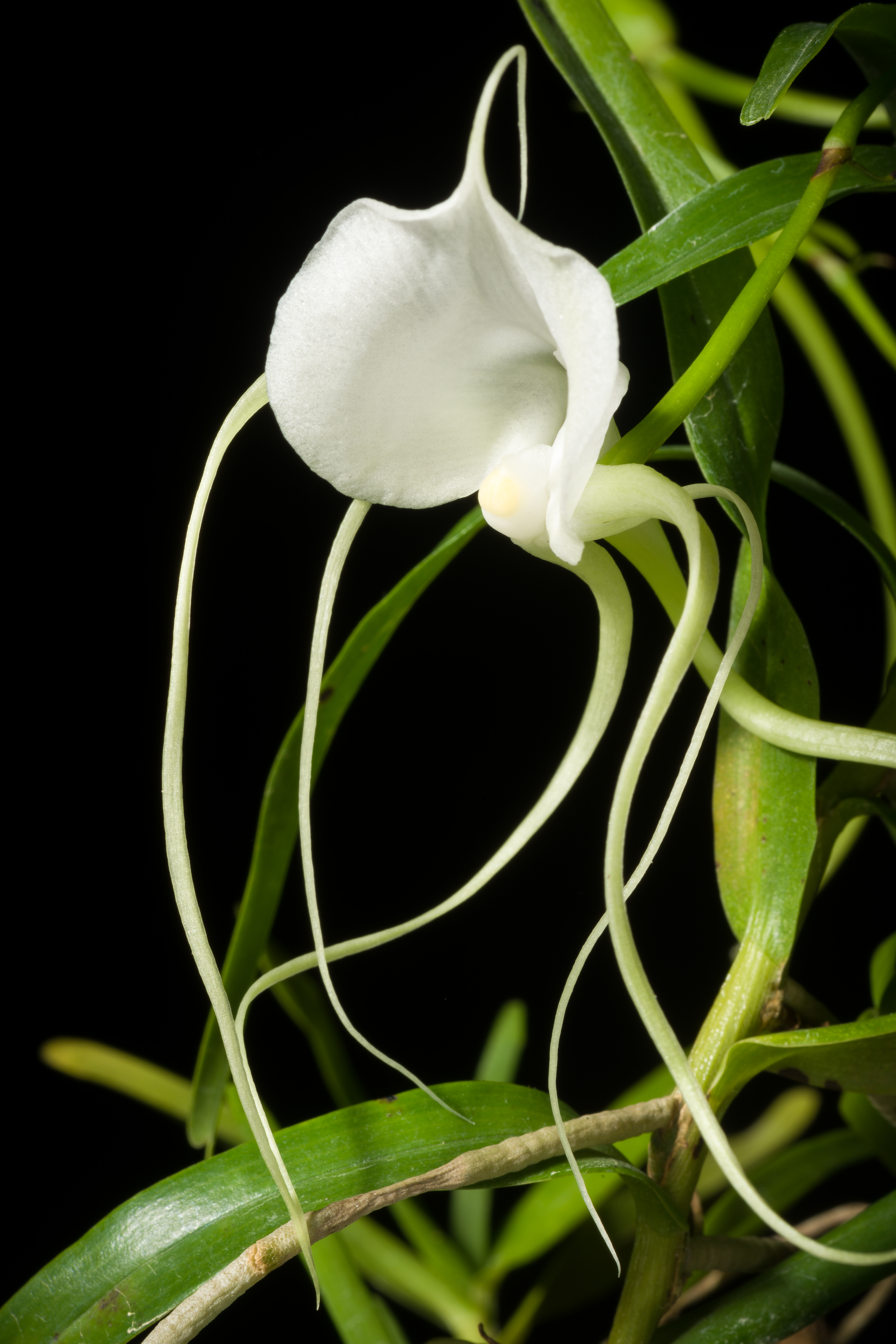

Scientific classification
- Kingdom: Plantae
- Clade: Tracheophytes
- Clade: Angiosperms
- Clade: Monocots
- Order: Asparagales
- Family: Orchidaceae
- Subfamily: Epidendroideae
- Genus: Angraecum
- Species: A. germinyanum

Binomial name
- Angraecum germinyanum Hook.f. (1889)

Synonyms
- Mystacidium germinyanum (Hook.f.) Rolfe (1904)

= Angraecum germinyanum =

Species of orchid

Angraecum germinyanum is a species of orchid. This species is found in Madagascar with a waxy flower occurring in spring and summer.
