= Homo erectus (album) =

Studio album by Schürzenjäger
- Released: 1997
- Genre: Rock, pop
- Length: 58:53
- Label: BMG Ariola Media GmbH
- Producer: Rudolf Müssig

Schürzenjäger chronology
Träume sind stärker (1996)	Homo erectus (1997)	25 Jahre Schürzenjäger (1998)

Homo erectus is a rock/pop album by the Austrian band Schürzenjäger.

== Track listing ==
1. "Der Fan-Song The fan song") – Müssig/C. Leis-Bendorff – 4:26
2. "Homo erectus (Rein in die Höhle)" "Homo erectus (Into the cave) – Müssig/C. Leis-Bendorff – 3:43
3. "Keine Angst" ("No fear") – Moll/Meinunger – 3:44
4. "Für mi bist du's" ("You're the one for me") – Müssig – 4:26
5. "Woaßt, wia des is?" ("Do you know, how it is like that?") – Klüter/Meinunger – 3:37
6. "I woaß net, was i mach" ("I don't know what I'm doing") – Müssig – 2:20
7. "Rio Grande" – Müssig – 4:08
8. "Der Sagibineda-Reggae" – Harwin – 2:50
9. "Koane Mädels nirgendwo" ("No girls anywhere") – Müssig/C. Leis-Bendorff – 2:48
10. "Da draußen is Sommer" ("Summer is out there") – Klüter/Meinunger – 4:13
11. "Die tuan was für die Leut" ("They do something for the people") – 2:56
12. "Das verlorene Paradies" ("The lost paradise") – Müssig/Kunze – 4:33
13. "Bäriger Boarischer ("Bear like Bavarian") – Müssig/C. Leis-Bendorff – 2:14
14. "Samba Republica Banana – Müssig – 3:26
15. "Immer gradaus" ("Ever straightforward") – Beyerl/Schlüter – 3:31
16. "Einmal, eines Tages" ("One of these days") – Müssig – 4:53

== Charts ==
=== Weekly charts ===
Chart (1997)	Peak position
Austrian Albums (Ö3 Austria)	10
German Albums (Offizielle Top 100)	8
Swiss Albums (Schweizer Hitparade)	12

=== Year-end charts ===
Chart (1997)	Position
Austrian Albums (Ö3 Austria)	40
German Albums (Offizielle Top 100)	93
