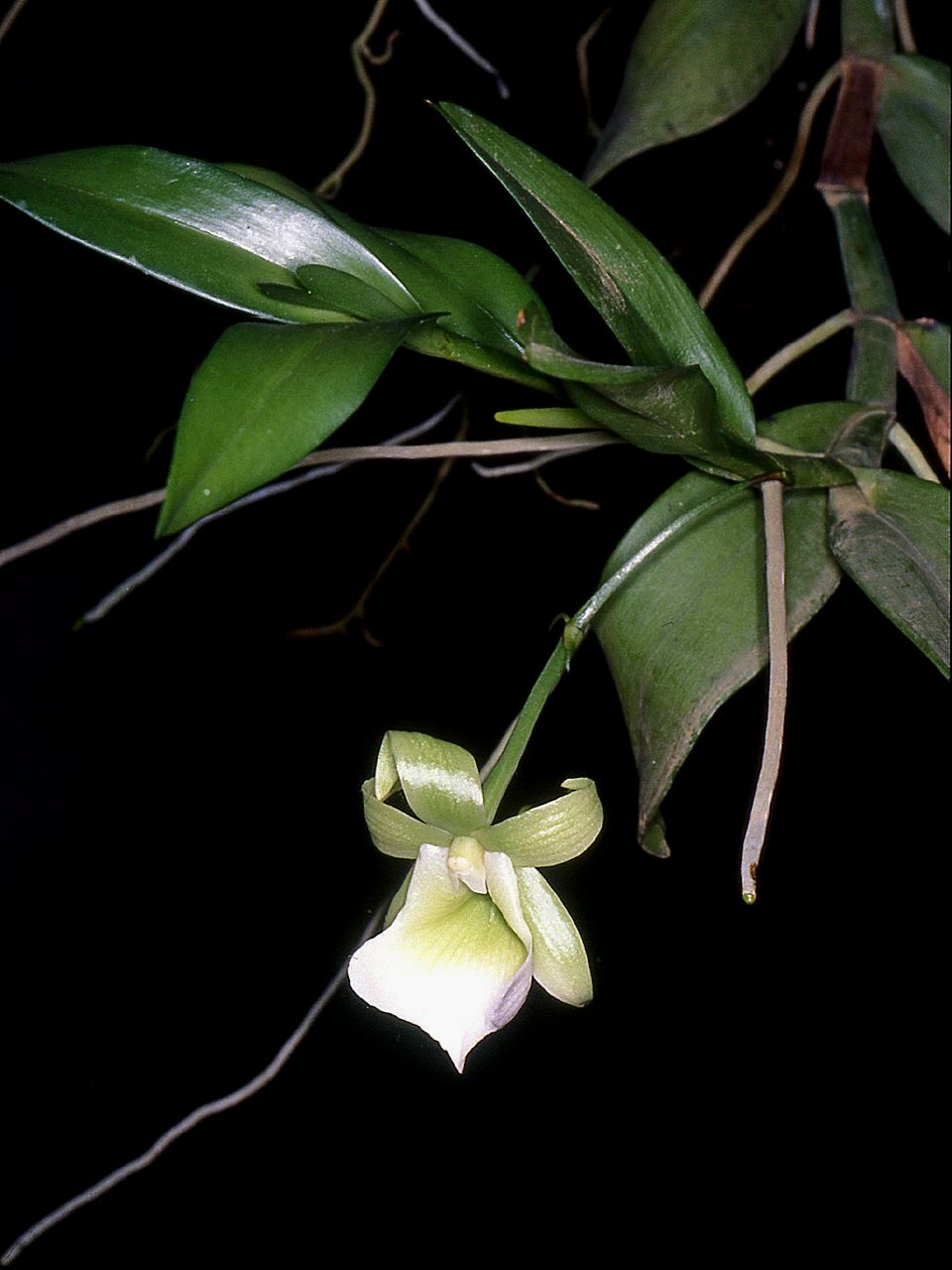

Scientific classification
- Kingdom: Plantae
- Clade: Tracheophytes
- Clade: Angiosperms
- Clade: Monocots
- Order: Asparagales
- Family: Orchidaceae
- Subfamily: Epidendroideae
- Genus: Angraecum
- Species: A. birrimense

Binomial name
- Angraecum birrimense Rolfe (1914)

= Angraecum birrimense =

Species of orchid

Angraecum birrimense is a species of orchid, found in Ghana, Ivory Coast, Liberia, Nigeria, Sierra Leone, Cameroon and Equatorial Guinea.
