= Angraecum atlanticum =

Conservation status
- Near Threatened (IUCN 3.1)

Scientific classification
- Kingdom: Plantae
- Clade: Tracheophytes
- Clade: Angiosperms
- Clade: Monocots
- Order: Asparagales
- Family: Orchidaceae
- Subfamily: Epidendroideae
- Genus: Angraecum
- Species: A. atlanticum

Binomial name
- Angraecum atlanticum Stévart & Droissart

Species of orchid

Angraecum atlanticum is a species of comet orchid that can be found in Equatorial Guinea and Gabon. It is known from three subpopulations; in Monte Alén National Park in Equatorial Guinea and in Moukalaba-Doudou National Park and Ivindo National Park in Gabon. It is found in epiphyte-rich submontane forest, and in the shrubby fringes rich in Burseraceae.
