= Erect =

Erect may refer to:

- Erect (position), something having an essentially upright position or vertical habit
- Erect, North Carolina, an unincorporated community in Randolph County, United States
- Erect image, an image that appears right-side up in optics
- Erect the Youth Problem, the only album released by American punk trio Wives
- Erection, the physiological engorgement with blood of the tissues of the penis and scrotum.

== See also ==
- Erection (disambiguation)
- Erecta, a feminine Latin word meaning erect
- Erectum (disambiguation), a neuter Latin word meaning erect
- Erectus (disambiguation), a masculine Latin word meaning erect
- List of plant morphology terms
- Glossary of botanical terms
