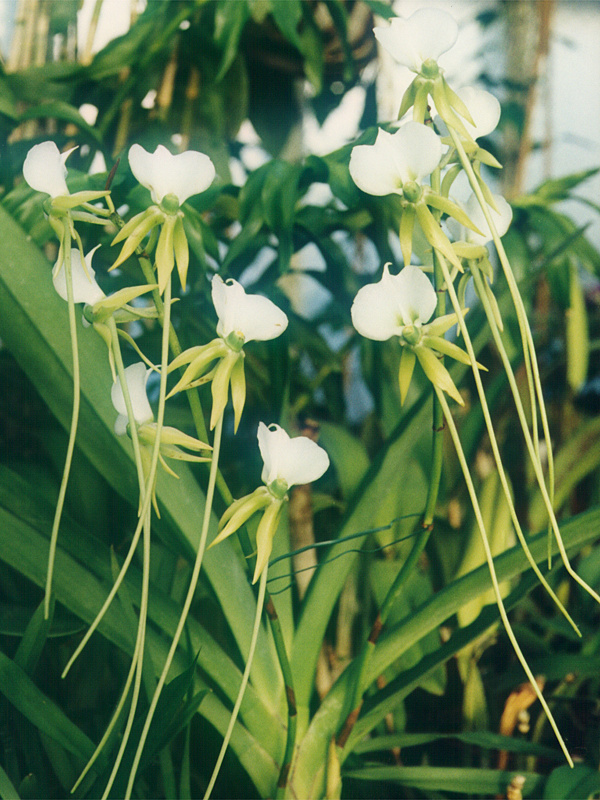

Scientific classification
- Kingdom: Plantae
- Clade: Tracheophytes
- Clade: Angiosperms
- Clade: Monocots
- Order: Asparagales
- Family: Orchidaceae
- Subfamily: Epidendroideae
- Tribe: Vandeae
- Subtribe: Angraecinae
- Genus: Angraecum
- Species: A. longicalcar

Binomial name
- Angraecum longicalcar (Bosser) Senghas, 1986

Synonyms
- Angraecum eburneum var. longicalcar Bosser, 1965

= Angraecum longicalcar =

Species of plant

Angraecum longicalcar, also known as the long spurred Angraecum, is a large critically endangered orchid endemic to the Central Highlands of Madagascar. This lithophytic species is noteworthy for its exceptionally long 40 cm nectar spur, rivalling that of the famous Darwins' orchid (A. sesquipedale), and as such may have the longest spur of any orchid species.

== Description ==
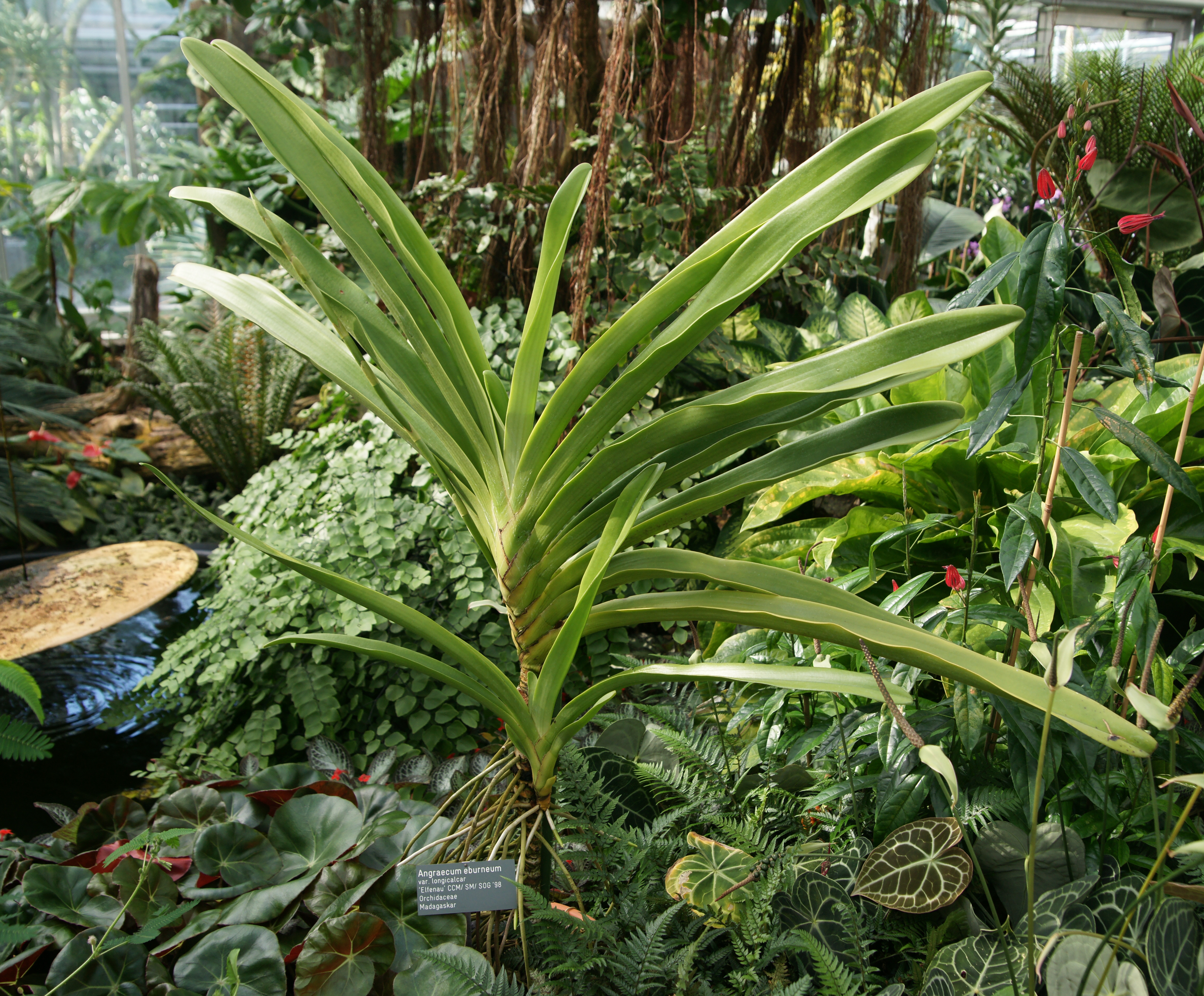
A. longicalcar as grown in cultivation.

Although its growth habit and flower morphology is similar to that of its closest relatives A. eburneum and A. superbum, it can be differentiated by its 40 cm long nectar spur (A. eburneum in contrast only has a 8 cm spur). When flowering, it creates around 11 white and green flowers on a flower stem that can reach up to 85 cm. Flowers have a strong nocturnal fragrance.

Like A. eburneum and A. superbum, A. longicalcar flowers are unusual amongst most orchids in that they are non-resupinate, i.e., oriented right side up instead of upside down (the white labellum or flower "lip" faces up instead of down).

== Ecology ==
The species is found growing exclusively as a lithophyte on rocky marble outcrops, at 1000-1200m above sea level. Flowers typically begin to open in February, and stay open until April. Once pollinated, seeds take around 6 months to mature within the seed pod.

=== Pollination ===
Although the species in the wild no longer gets naturally pollinated due to the hypothesized extinction of its natural pollinator, the strong nocturnal fragrance, long nectar spur, and white colouration of the blooms suggests that the species' pollinator was likely a species of large sphinx moth with an extremely long proboscis for accessing the nectar within the long spur, as is the case with many other species of Angraecum.

==== Potential Sphinx Moth Pollinators ====
Its sphinx moth pollinator would need to have both a long proboscis and the ability to feed while hovering in place.

While most orchids have resupinate flowers, the unusual non-resupinate flower orientation (which is shared with a few other Angraecum species) in this species prevents any potential moth pollinators from landing on the flower lip. This means the pollinator must pollinate it in flight. However, many sphinx moths have swinging flight patterns (swing-hovering) when they need to hover feed, to avoid predation from spiders that may hide within flowers.

This swinging flight means that such sphinx moths do not fully extend their proboscis into the nectar spur; full extension of the proboscis is necessary for pollination, as the attachment sight of the flower's pollinia is at the base of the proboscis. In greenhouse experiments with potential sphinx moth pollinators, Xanthopan morganii praedicta (A. sesquipedale's pollinator) could not pollinate A. longicalcar for this reason, despite a proboscis length of over 20 cm.

Coelonia solani, another Malagasy sphinx moth with an extremely long proboscis (19 cm), was the only species in the study that successfully pollinated the flower, but it could only do so on one unusual occasion, with an abnormally behaving individual that did not swing-hover.

== Conservation ==
Although successfully cultivated in horticulture, the species is critically endangered in the wild (as assessed according to IUCN's Red List criteria, although the IUCN itself has not yet assessed the species). In 2011, expeditions to monitor its status in its natural habitat could find only few more than 12 individuals remaining. KMCC has since launched a conservation project to protect the species.

The project hand-pollinates flowers and collects seeds from the wild to propagate in vitro. By 2004, the project had raised 400 young plants, 150 of which were reintroduced into the wild by 2014, and have since been protected and pollinated by the local community of Ambatofinandrahana.

The main threats to the species are illegal collection for the local and international orchid trade, as well as the annual grassland fires which occur in their habitat. Furthermore, it is also hypothesized that its sphinx moth pollinator is already extinct, as wild plants no longer produce seed pods without being hand-pollinated.
