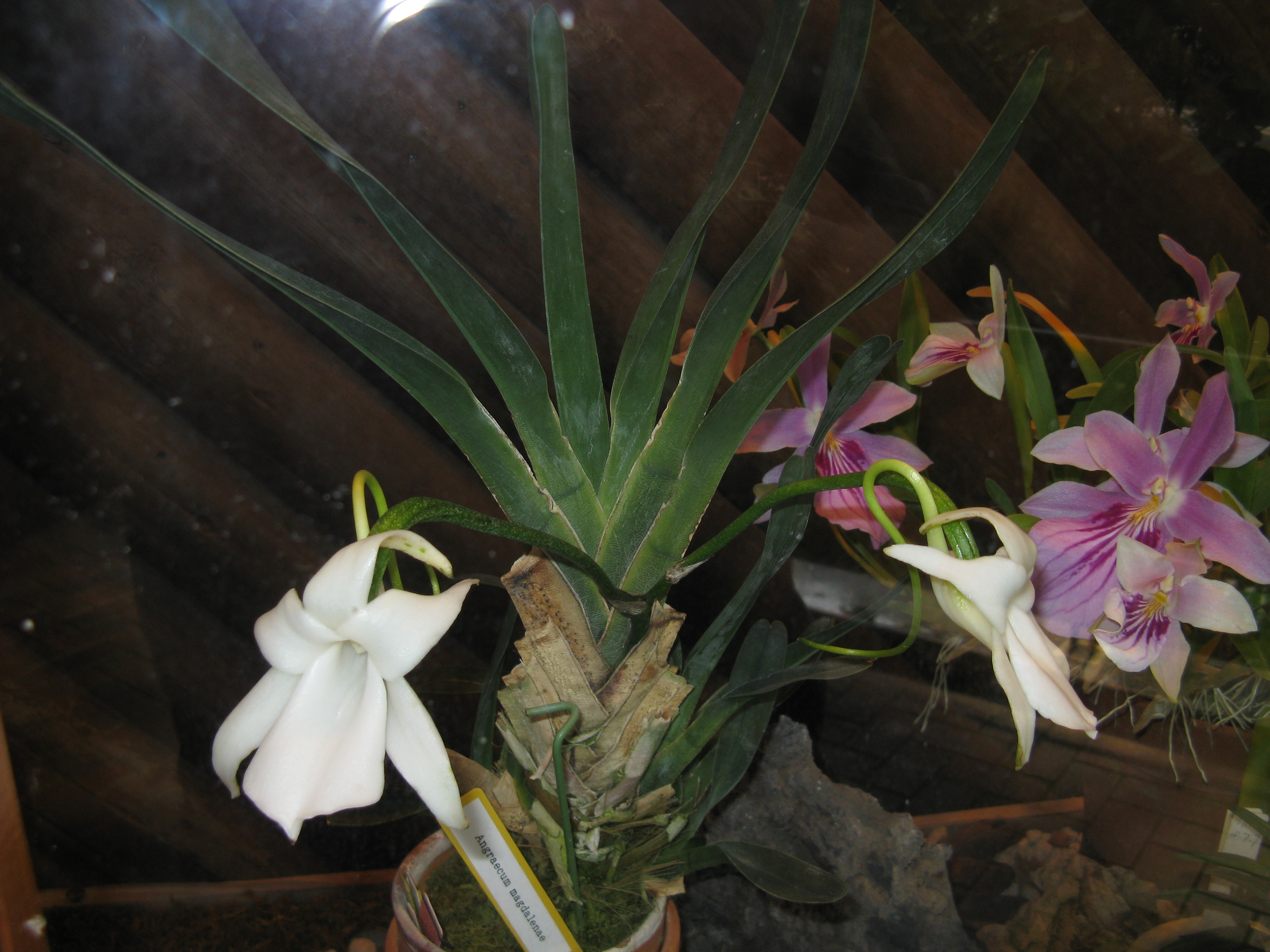

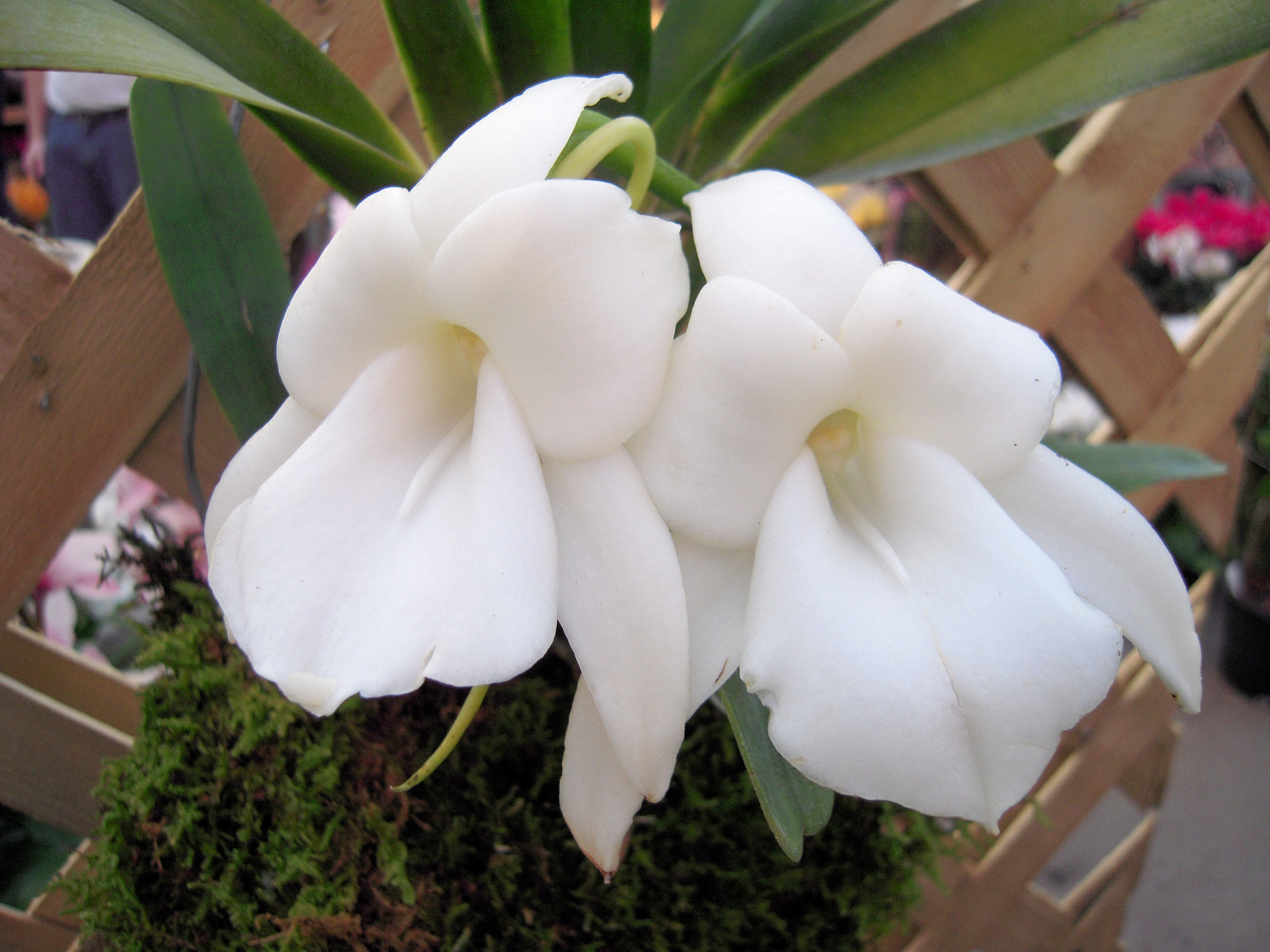
- Close-up of flowers

Scientific classification
- Kingdom: Plantae
- Clade: Tracheophytes
- Clade: Angiosperms
- Clade: Monocots
- Order: Asparagales
- Family: Orchidaceae
- Subfamily: Epidendroideae
- Genus: Angraecum
- Species: A. magdalenae

Binomial name
- Angraecum magdalenae Schltr. & H.Perrier

Synonyms
- Rudolfangraecum magdalenae (Schltr. & H.Perrier) Szlach., Mytnik & Grochocka

= Angraecum magdalenae =

Species of plant

Angraecum magdalenae, also called Magdalena's angraecum, is a species of epiphytic orchid in the genus Angraecum. It is native and endemic to Madagascar.

== Taxonomy ==
The species was first formally described by Rudolf Schlechter and Joseph Marie Henry Alfred Perrier de la Bâthie in 1925.

=== Etymology ===
According to Rudolf Schlechter, the type specimen was found in Ibity, in the Vakinankaratra region, then cultivated in Tananarivo by a woman called Madelaine Durchud, which led to assigning the species the Latin specific epithet magdalenae (meaning "Magdalena's") as a form of dedication, due to Madelaine being the French variant of the given name.

== Description ==
Lithophytic chamaephyte, typically short, at 20 centimeters tall, yet robust. Roots are described as thread-like, hairless and flexuous. Each shoot contains approximately 6 leaves, established plants reaching 8. The leaves are oblong-ligulate and apically bilobed, with a fleshy-coriaceous texture. They grow to 13-16 centimeters in length, 3 centimeters in width in the middle of the leaf. The white flowers, which are similar in appearance to the flowers of Angraecum leonis, but differentiated by larger size, bloom in January and became distinctly fragrant in the evening. The fragrant smell is utilized by the plant to lead to pollination by moths of the Sphingidae family.

== Distribution ==
First collected in Central Madagascar, the species remains restricted to the region and to the rocky, quartzite-rich outcrops of Mount Ibity, where, as of 2005, approximately 100 known specimens are located. The preferred altitude at which the species grows ranges between 800 and 2000 meters.

== Subtaxa ==
The following subspecies are accepted:

- Angraecum magdalenae var. magdalenae
- Angraecum magdalenae var. latiilabellum Bosser
