= Angraecum rutenbergianum =

Scientific classification
- Kingdom: Plantae
- Clade: Embryophytes
- Clade: Tracheophytes
- Clade: Angiosperms
- Clade: Monocots
- Order: Asparagales
- Family: Orchidaceae
- Subfamily: Epidendroideae
- Genus: Angraecum
- Species: A. rutenbergianum

Binomial name
- Angraecum rutenbergianum Kraenzl. (1882)

Species of orchid

Angraecum rutenbergianum is a species of orchid native to Madagascar.
