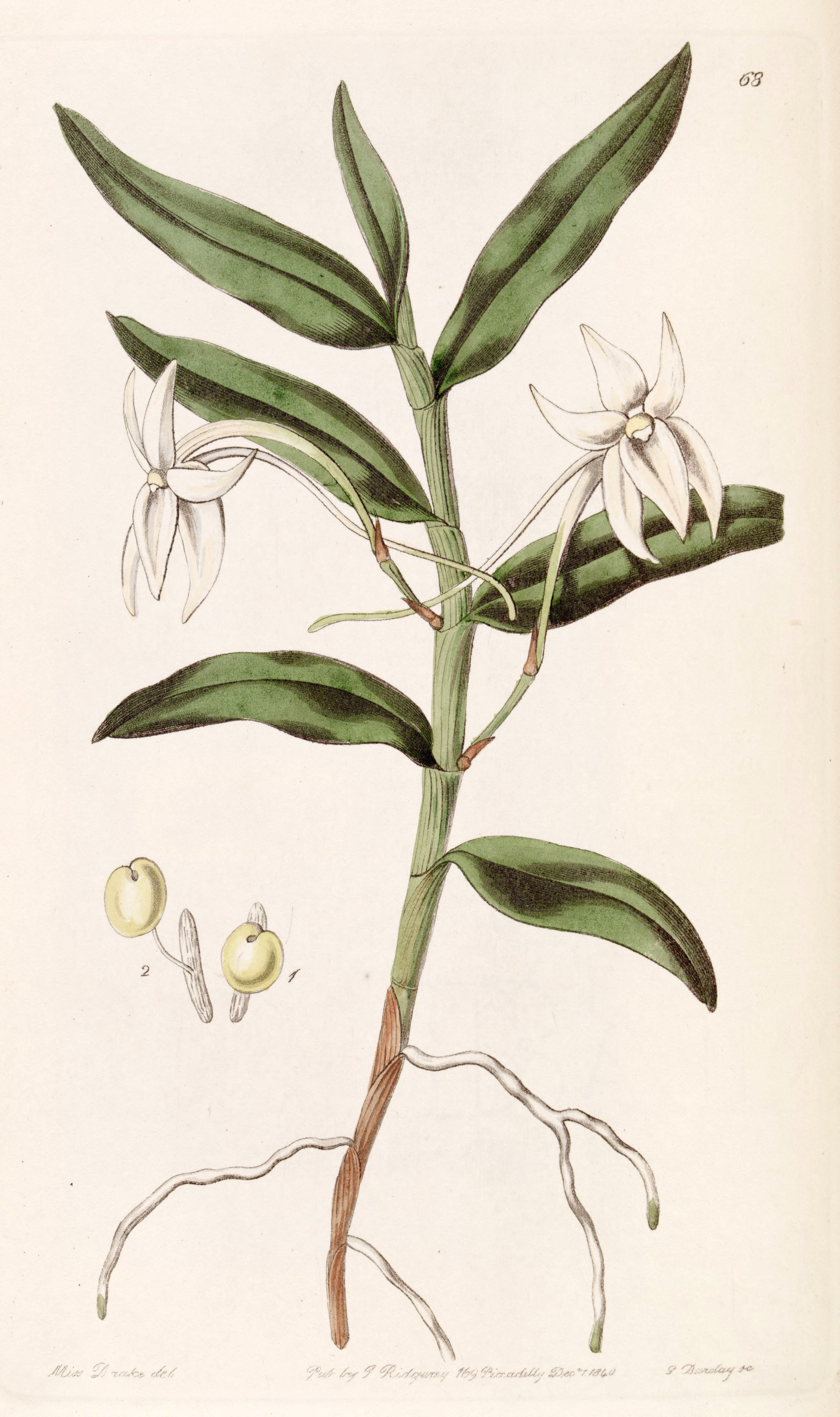

Scientific classification
- Kingdom: Plantae
- Clade: Tracheophytes
- Clade: Angiosperms
- Clade: Monocots
- Order: Asparagales
- Family: Orchidaceae
- Subfamily: Epidendroideae
- Genus: Angraecum
- Species: A. mauritianum

Binomial name
- Angraecum mauritianum (Poir.) Frapp. (1889)

Synonyms
- Orchis mauritiana Poir. (1798) (Basionym); Limodorum mauritianum (Poir.) Sw. (1829); Angraecum gladiifolium Thouars (1822); Aerobion gladiifolium (Thouars) Spreng. (1826); Aeranthes gladiifolia (Thouars) Rchb.f. (1864); Angorchis gladiifolia (Thouars) Kuntze (1891); Mystacidium mauritianum (Poir.) T.Durand & Schinz (1894); Mystacidium gladiifolium (Thouars) Rolfe (1904); Macroplectrum gladiifolium (Thouars) Pfitzer ex Finet (1907)

= Angraecum mauritianum =

Species of orchid

Angraecum mauritianum is a small, epiphytic species of orchid. It is native to Mauritius where it can still be found along roadsides. It favours low tree trunks or logs, and does not grow higher up in trees.

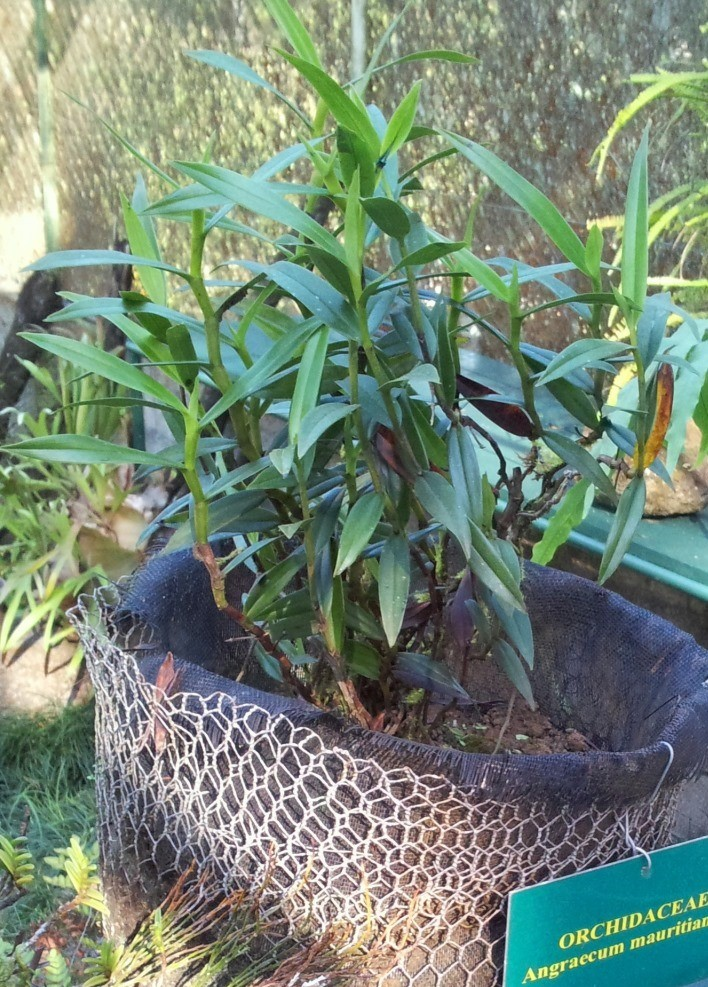
Angraecum mauritianum in Monvert Nature Park.
