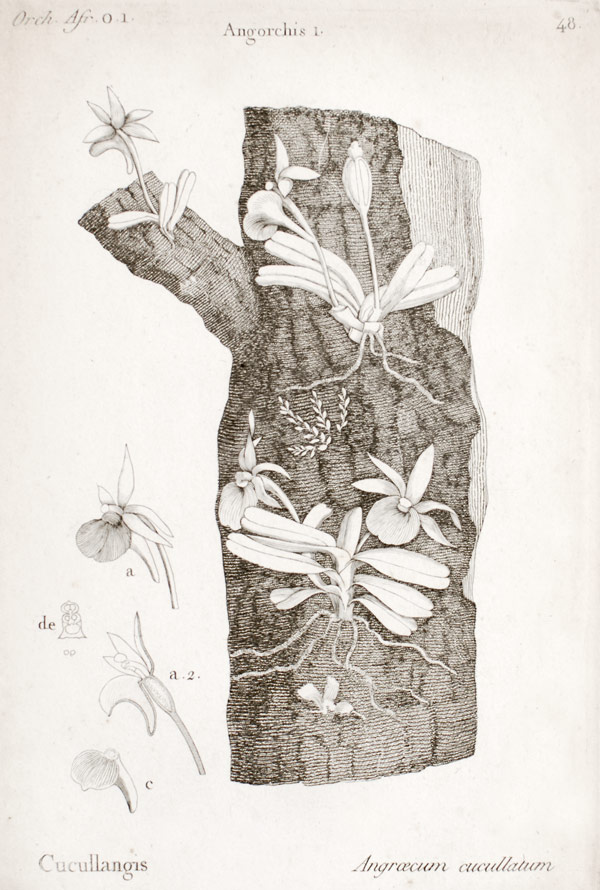

Scientific classification
- Kingdom: Plantae
- Clade: Tracheophytes
- Clade: Angiosperms
- Clade: Monocots
- Order: Asparagales
- Family: Orchidaceae
- Subfamily: Epidendroideae
- Genus: Angraecum
- Species: A. cucullatum

Binomial name
- Angraecum cucullatum Thouars (1822)

Synonyms
- Aerobion cucullatum (Thouars) Spreng. (1826); Angorchis cucullata (Thouars) Kuntze (1891); Angorchis cucullangis Thouars ex Kuntze (1894); Angorchis fragrangis Thouars ex Kuntze (1894); Macroplectrum cucullatum (Thouars) Finet (1907)

= Angraecum cucullatum =

Species of orchid

Angraecum cucullatum is a species of orchid found in Réunion.
