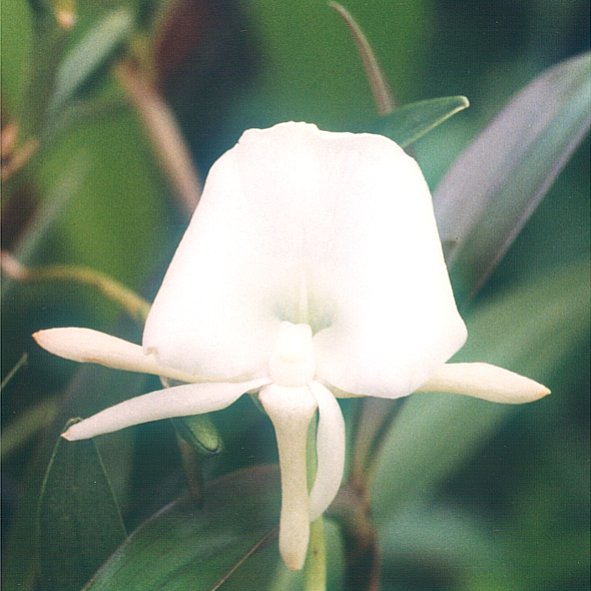

Scientific classification
- Kingdom: Plantae
- Clade: Tracheophytes
- Clade: Angiosperms
- Clade: Monocots
- Order: Asparagales
- Family: Orchidaceae
- Subfamily: Epidendroideae
- Genus: Angraecum
- Species: A. scottianum

Binomial name
- Angraecum scottianum Rchb.f. (1878)

Synonyms
- Angorchis scottiana (Rchb.f.) Kuntze (1891); Angraecum reichenbachianum Kraenzl. (1890); Arachnangraecum scottianum (Rchb.f.) Szlach., Mytnik & Grochocka (2013)

= Angraecum scottianum =

Species of orchid

Angraecum scottianum is a species of orchid. It is an epiphytic subshrub endemic to the Comoro Islands.
