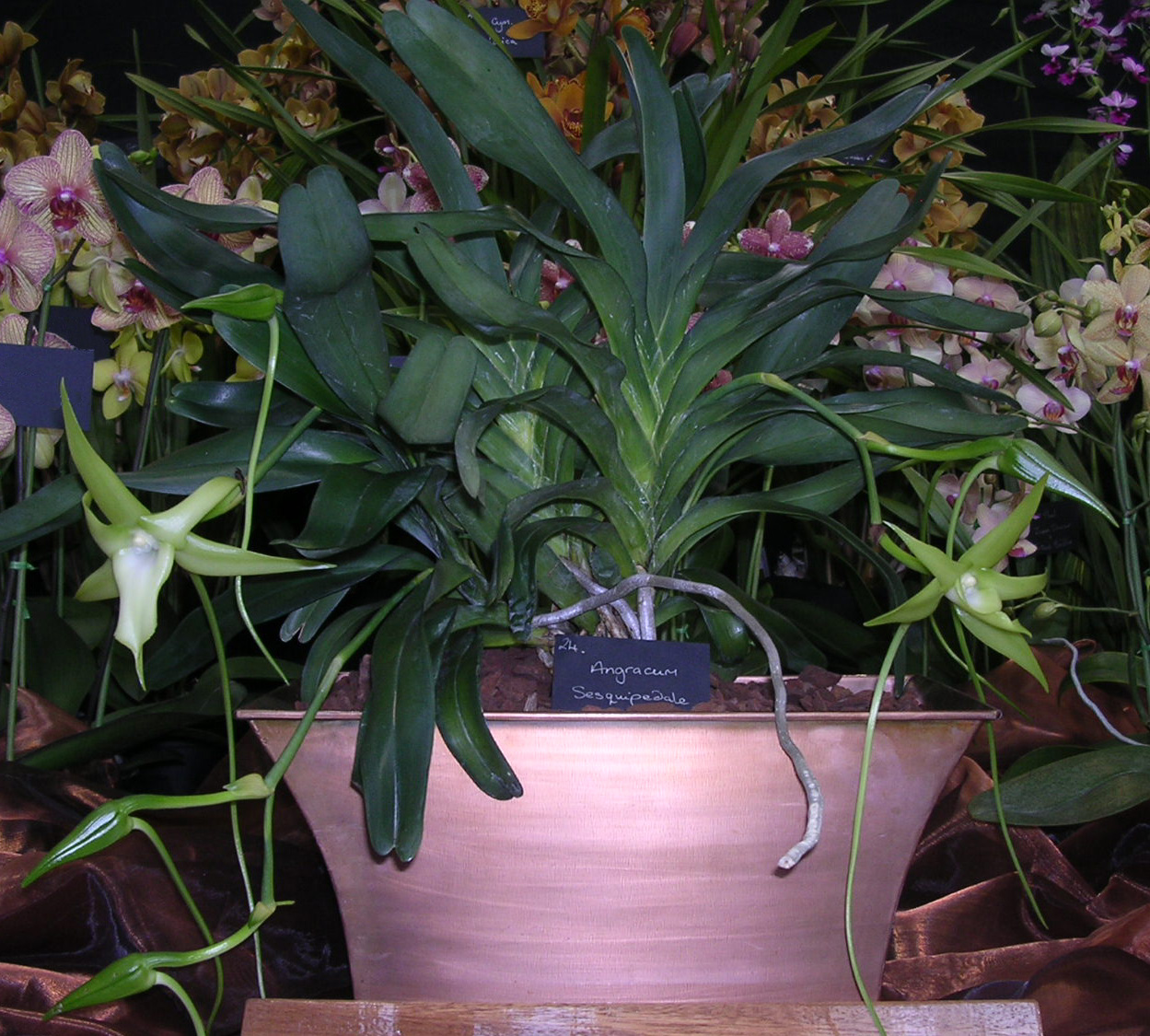
- Angraecum sesquipedale habitus Note extremely long spurs of flowers

Scientific classification
- Kingdom: Plantae
- Clade: Embryophytes
- Clade: Tracheophytes
- Clade: Angiosperms
- Clade: Monocots
- Order: Asparagales
- Family: Orchidaceae
- Subfamily: Epidendroideae
- Tribe: Vandeae
- Subtribe: Angraecinae
- Genus: Angraecum; Bory

Type species
- Angraecum eburneum Bory

Species
- See list of Angraecum species for complete list

Synonyms
- List: Aerobion Kaempf. ex Spreng.; Angorkis Thouars; Angraecoides (Cordem.) Szlach., Mytnik & Grochocka; Arachnangraecum (Schltr.) Szlach., Mytnik & Grochocka; Bonniera Cordem.; Boryangraecum (Schltr.) Szlach., Mytnik & Grochocka; Conchograecum Szlach., Grochocka, Oledrz. & Mytnik; Ctenorchis K.Schum.; Dolabrifolia (Pfitzer) Szlach. & Romowicz; Eichlerangraecum Szlach., Mytnik & Grochocka; Gomphocentrum (Benth.) Szlach., Mytnik & Grochocka; Hadrangis (Schltr.) Szlach., Mytnik & Grochocka; Hermansia Szlach., Mytnik & Grochocka; Humblotiangraecum (Schltr.) Szlach., Mytnik & Grochocka; Lemurangis (Garay) Szlach., Mytnik & Grochocka; Lepervenchea Cordem.; Lesliegraecum Szlach., Mytnik & Grochocka; Macroplectrum Pfitzer; Monixus Finet; Pectinaria (Benth.) Cordem.; Pectinariella Szlach., Mytnik & Grochocka; Perrierangraecum (Schltr.) Szlach., Mytnik & Grochocka; Pseudojumellea (Schltr.) Szlach., Mytnik & Grochocka; Rudolfangraecum Szlach., Mytnik & Grochocka

= Angraecum =

Genus of orchids

Angraecum, also known as comet orchid, is a genus of the family Orchidaceae native to tropical and South Africa, as well as Sri Lanka. It contains 223 species.

== Description ==
Angraecums are quite varied vegetatively and florally, and are adapted to dry tropical woodland habitat and have quite fleshy leaves as a consequence. Most are epiphytes, but a few are lithophytes.

The long-lasting flowers are racemose and grow from the leaf axils. They are mostly white, but a few are yellow, green or ochre. They all have a long spur at the back of the labellum (lip).

In the case of Angraecum sesquipedale, a species from Madagascar, on observing the 30 centimetres (12 in) spur in the lip, Charles Darwin made the hypothesis that, since the nectar was at the bottom of the spur, a pollinator must exist with a tongue at least that long. Otherwise the orchid could never be pollinated. At the time, he was not believed. However, in 1903, the predicted pollinator was discovered, a hawk moth then named Xanthopan morganii praedicta ("praedicta" meaning "the predicted one"). It has an appropriately long proboscis. The specific name sesquipedale means "one foot and a half", referring to the length of the spur. This is an example of mutual dependence of an orchid and a specific pollinator.

== Taxonomy ==
The genus was described by Jean-Baptiste Bory de Saint-Vincent in 1804 with Angraecum eburneum Bory as the type species. Within the tribe Vandeae it is placed in the subtribe Angraecinae.

=== Etymology ===
Despite the genus's distribution being largely confined to Africa and its offshore islands, the genus name is a latinization of the Malay word anggrek ("orchid"), itself ultimately from Javanese ꦲꦔ꧀ꦒꦿꦺꦏ꧀ (anggrék, "orchid").

== Distribution ==
Tropical Africa and Madagascar contain the majority of the genus with one outlier found on Sri Lanka, and three species once thought to belong to the genus in Japan and the Philippines. But these orchids can also be found on the Comoros, the Seychelles, and the Mascarenes. They occur between sea level and 2,000 metres (6,600 ft) in humid regions.

== Ecology ==
=== Pollination ===
The most commonly known example of Angraecum pollination is the relationship of Angraecum sesquipedale, which is pollinated by the moth species Xanthopan morganii praedicta However, different modes of pollination are known to occur in Angraecum. Bird pollination has been reported to occur in Angraecum striatum, which is pollinated by the bird species Zosterops borbonicus Boddaert. Angraecum cadetii is pollinated by the cricket species Glomeremus orchidophilus. There have also been speculations regarding pollination of Angraecum cadetii Bosser and Angraecum bracteosum Balf. & S. Moore through the lizard species Phelsuma borbonica

== Conservation ==
Many species of Angraecum orchid are considered to be at risk of extinction in the wild and are protected from international trade under CITES. The genus Angraecum is listed as one of the top conservation priorities by the International Union for Conservation of Nature and Natural Resources (IUCN) Orchid Specialist Group. Many of the species, such as Angraecum sororium, are endemic to Madagascar and are threatened from over collecting, loss of hawkmoth pollinators, habitat fragmentation, and fire.

== Horticulture ==
In horticulture the generic name is abbreviated as Angcm. Like all other orchids it is best to water in the mornings to avoid fungal rot due to overnight dampness. Feeding as per other orchids and similar light conditions: in humid and hot regions (sub tropical) feed fortnightly during growing season (Summer) with a certified orchid fertiliser following directions on packet, weaker solutions are also okay if you're worried. In summer water weekly or more depending on situation. Angraecums flower best when in a lighter position. Keep out of direct sunlight as this can damage (and eventually kill) the plant. Most Angraecums will have their leaves for a number of years so any sun burn spots are ugly for a significant period and also may expose your plant to disease. In indirect sunlight the Angraecums will reward you with blooms and attractive growth.

Angraecum Veitchii: a very rewarding orchid. When watered regularly in indirect sunlight, this plant will produce blooms annually (late winter to spring). The flowers last a while if kept in a sheltered position, and their strong fragrance, which they release only during the night, is delightful. Flowers are large (4–9 centimetres (1.6–3.5 in) across), with a waxy coating and white to greenish cream in color, and borne on stems of seven to ten depending on the faithfulness of your fertilizing, watering, and indirect light provision. The leaves are large, thick straps that alternately fan out from a central (monopodal) stem. Pups (keikis) form at the base of the stem and can either be divided from the parent plant once they have at least three roots of their own or, alternatively, left on the plant. These will make a good specimen, as when mature, they will produce blooms with the parent plant. As they are epiphytes, the potting mixture should be loose and free-draining. Prolific roots are formed from the base and also amongst the lower half of the foliage. These can be troublesome when moving the plant. Once your angraecum is big enough, it is best to secure it in a heavy terracotta pot or place a brick in the bottom of the pot in order to ensure the plant does not get top-heavy and risk snapping when blown over in the wind, especially since they flower during the windier times of the year. When watering, a good soaking with a hose or watering can is best, as this helps to flush away any salts from fertilizers that may be present in the potting mixture and also thoroughly wets the plant.

=== Hybrids ===
- Angraecum Alabaster - A. eburneum x A. Veitchii - Kirsch, 1960.
- Angraecum Amazing Grace - A. florulentum x A. magdalenae - Takimoto, 1993.
- Angraecum Andromeda - A. North Star x A. compactum - Woodland, 2004.
- Angraecum Appalachian Star - A. sesquipedale x A. praestans - Breckinridge, 1992.
- Angraecum Argonaut - A. Longiscott x A. longicalcar - Hoosier, 2006.
- Angraecum Cesária Évora - A. distichum x A. podochiloides - Knecht (Glicenstein), 2013.
- Angraecum Christmas Star - A. Alabaster x A. eburneum - Kirsch, 1975.
- Angraecum Clare Sainsbury - A. Lady Lisa x A. scottianum - Stewart, 1994.
- Angraecum Crestwood - A. Veitchii x A. sesquipedale - Crestwood, 1973.
- Angraecum Crystal Star - A. rutenbergianum x A. magdalenae - Pulley, 1989.
- Angraecum Cuculena - A. cucullatum x A. magdalenae - Hillerman, 1989.
- Angraecum Dianne's Darling - A. sesquipedale x A. Alabaster - Yarwood, 2000.
- Angraecum Eburlena - A. eburneum x A. magdalenae - Hillerman, 1984.
- Angraecum Eburscott - A. scottianum x A. eburneum - Hillerman, 1982.
- Angraecum Giryvig - A. eburneum subsp. Giryamae x A. viguieri - Hillerman, 1986.
- Angraecum Hillerman's Last - A. leonis x A. eburneum subsp. Superbum - Sweeney, 1999.
- Angraecum Lady Lisa - A. scottianum x A. magdalenae - Williams, 1977.
- Angraecum Lemförde White Beauty - A. magdalenae x A. sesquipedale - Lemförder Orch., 1984.
- Angraecum Longibert - A. eburneum subsp. Superbum x A. humbertii - Hillerman, 1983.
- Angraecum Longilena - A. longicalcar x A. magdalenae - Hillerman, 2004.
- Angraecum Longiscott - A. eburneum subsp. Superbum x A. scottianum - Hillerman, 1982.
- Angraecum Malagasy - A. sesquipedale x A. sororium - Hillerman, 1983.
- Angraecum Memoria George Kennedy - A. eburneum subsp. Giryamae x A. eburneum subsp. Superbum - Nail, 1981.
- Angraecum Memoria Mark Aldridge - A. sesquipedale x A. eburneum subsp. Superbum - Timm, 1993.
- Angraecum North Star - A. sesquipedale x A. leonis - Woodland, 2002.
- Angraecum Ol Tukai - A. eburneum subsp. superbum x A. sesquipedale - Perkins, 1967.
- Angraecum Orchid Jungle - A. eburneum x A. praestans - Fennell, 1979.
- Angraecum Orchidglade - A. sesquipedale x A. eburneum subsp. giryamae, J.& s., 1964.
- Angraecum Rose Ann Carroll - A. eichlerianum x A. sesquipedale - Johnson, 1995.
- Angraecum Ruffels - A. Eburlena x A. magdalenae - Hoosier, 2006.
- Angraecum Scotticom - A. scottianum x A. eburneum subsp. Superbum - Hillerman, 1982.
- Angraecum Sesquibert - A. sesquipedale x A. humbertii - Hillerman, 1982.
- Angraecum Sesquivig - A. viguieri x A. sesquipedale - Castillon, 1988.
- Angraecum Sorodale - A. sororium x A. magdalenae - RHS, 2005.
- Angraecum Star Bright - A. sesquipedale x A. didieri - H.& R., 1989.
- Angraecum Stephanie - A. Veitchii x A. magdalenae - Hillerman, 1982.
- Angraecum Supercom - A. eburneum subsp. superbum x A. compactum - Hillerman, 1986.
- Angraecum Superlena - A. eburneum subsp. Superbum x A. magdalenae - Hillerman, 1983.
- Angraecum Supero - A. eburneum subsp. Superbum x A. sororium - Hillerman, 1988.
- Angraecum Supertans - A. eburneum subsp. Superbum x A. equitans - Hillerman, 1981.
- Angraecum Suzanne Lecoufle - A. mauritianum x A. dryadum - Lecoufle, 2007.
- Angraecum Veitchii - A. eburneum x A. sesquipedale - Veitch, 1899.
- Angraecum Vigulena - A. magdalenae x A. viguieri - Hillerman, 1987.
- Angraecum White Diamond - A. Supertans x A. equitans - Hoosier, 2000.
- Angraecum White Emblem - A. didieri x A. magdalenae - Matsuda, 1991.
- Angraecum Willa Berryman - A. eburneum x A. Christmas Star - Boersma, 2003.
