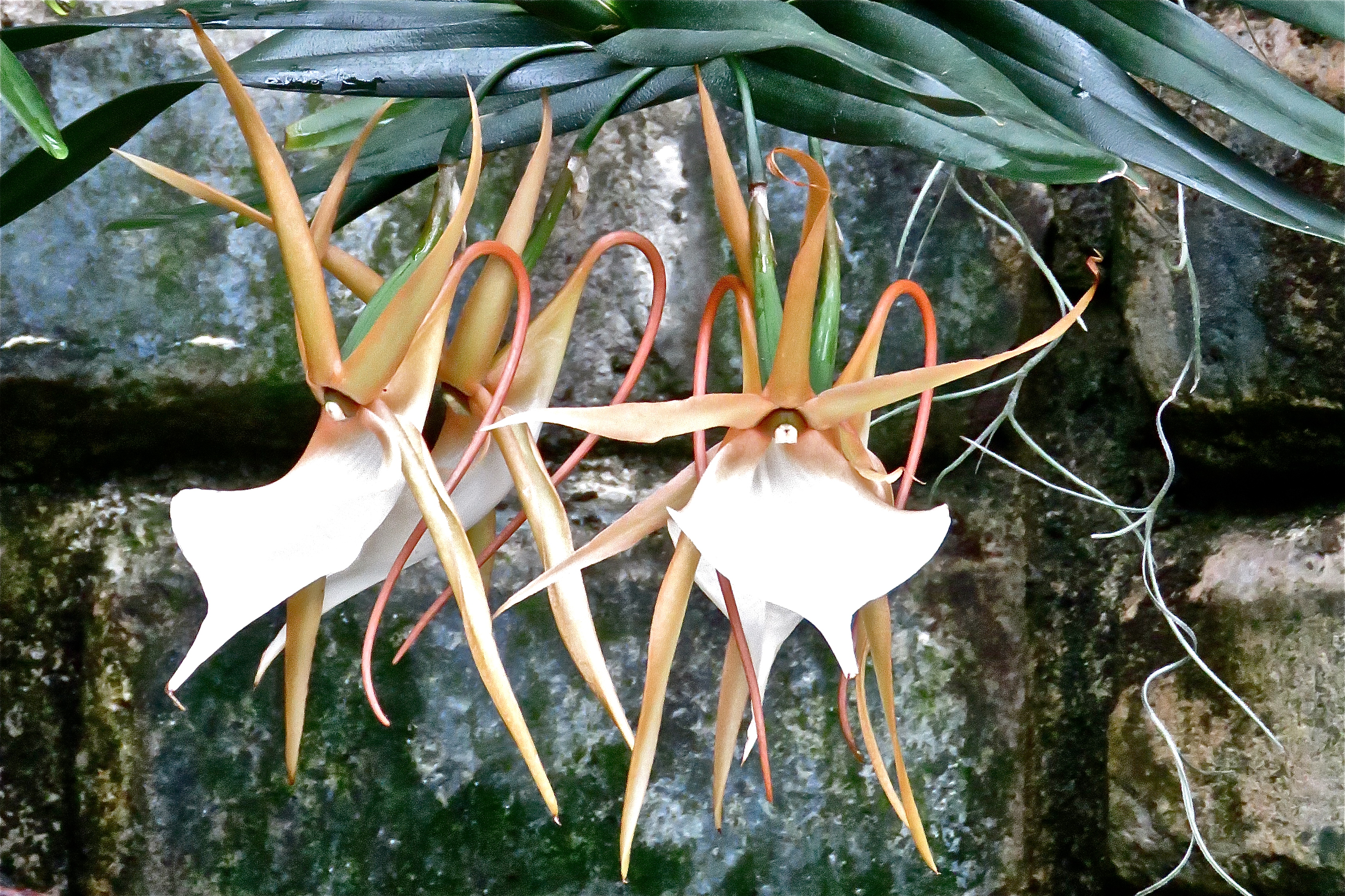

Scientific classification
- Kingdom: Plantae
- Clade: Embryophytes
- Clade: Tracheophytes
- Clade: Angiosperms
- Clade: Monocots
- Order: Asparagales
- Family: Orchidaceae
- Subfamily: Epidendroideae
- Genus: Angraecum
- Species: A. viguieri

Binomial name
- Angraecum viguieri Schltr. (1922)

= Angraecum viguieri =

Species of orchid

Angraecum viguieri is a species of orchid.

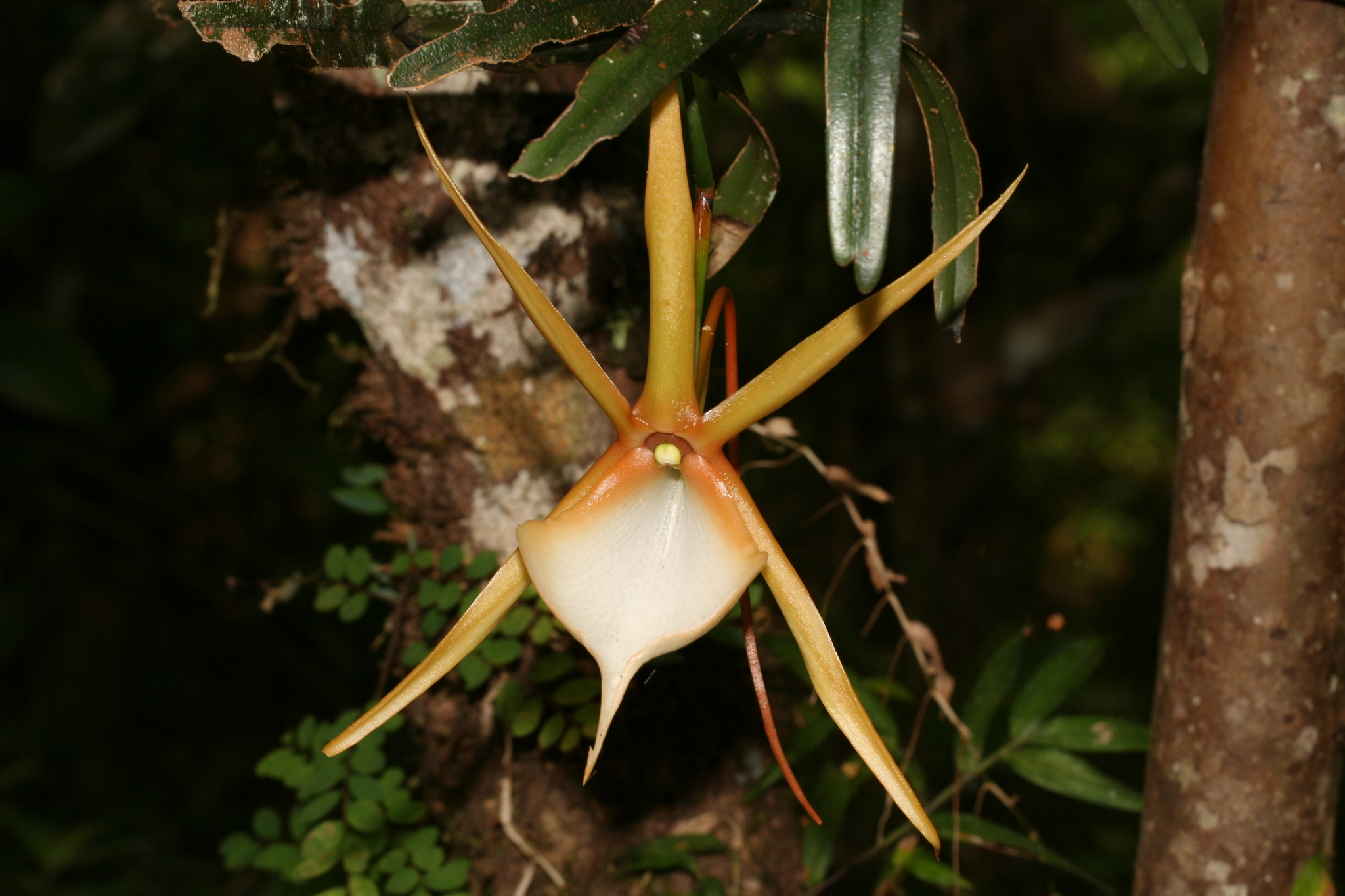
In Madagascar
