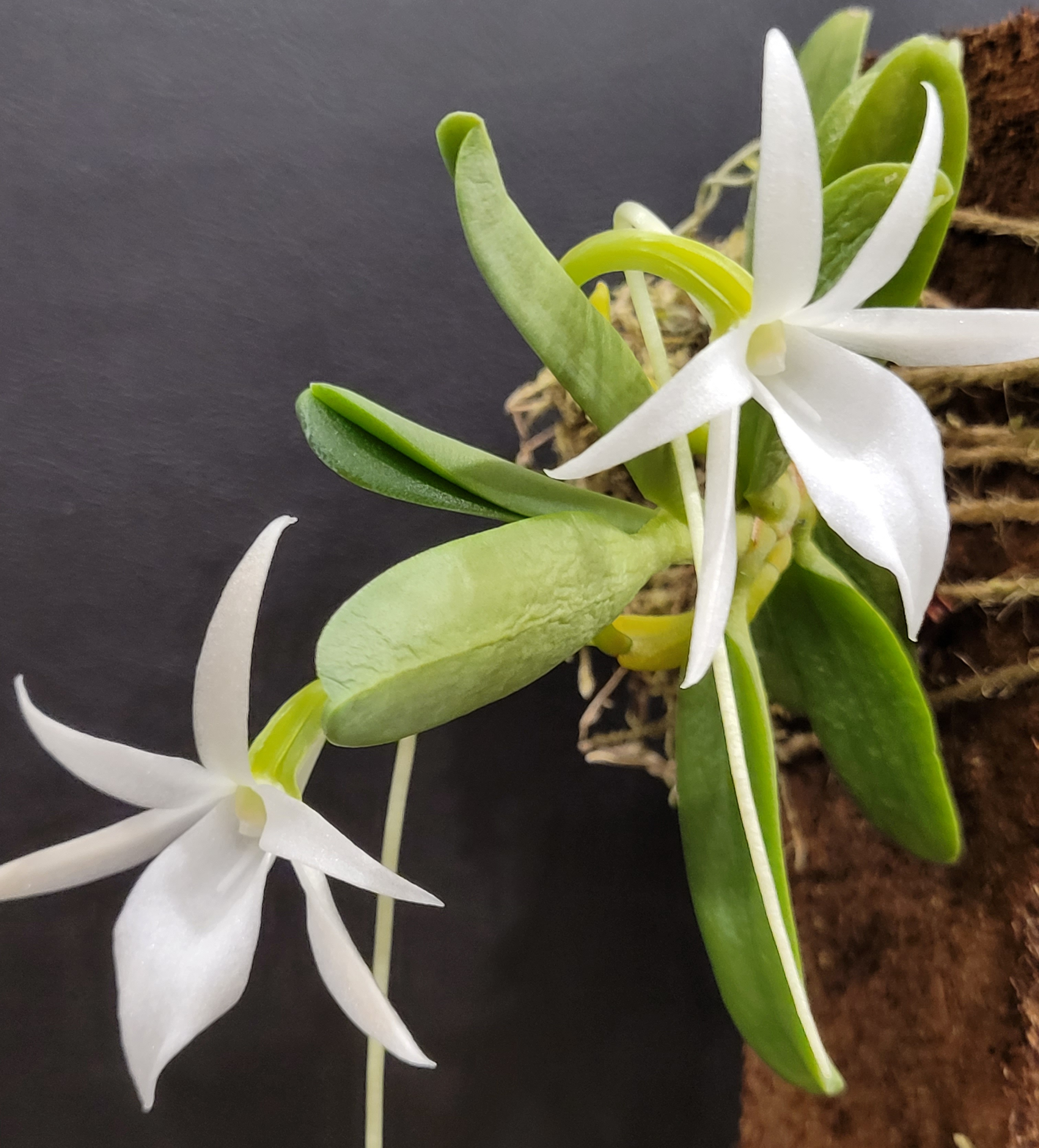

Conservation status
- CITES Appendix II (CITES)

Scientific classification
- Kingdom: Plantae
- Clade: Tracheophytes
- Clade: Angiosperms
- Clade: Monocots
- Order: Asparagales
- Family: Orchidaceae
- Subfamily: Epidendroideae
- Genus: Angraecum
- Species: A. equitans

Binomial name
- Angraecum equitans Schltr. (1916)

Synonyms
- Humblotiangraecum equitans Schltr. (1916)

= Angraecum equitans =

Species of orchid

Angraecum equitans is a species of flowering plant in the family Orchidaceae. The native range of the species is Northern Madagascar. The plant is epiphytic and grows primarily in wet tropical biomes.
