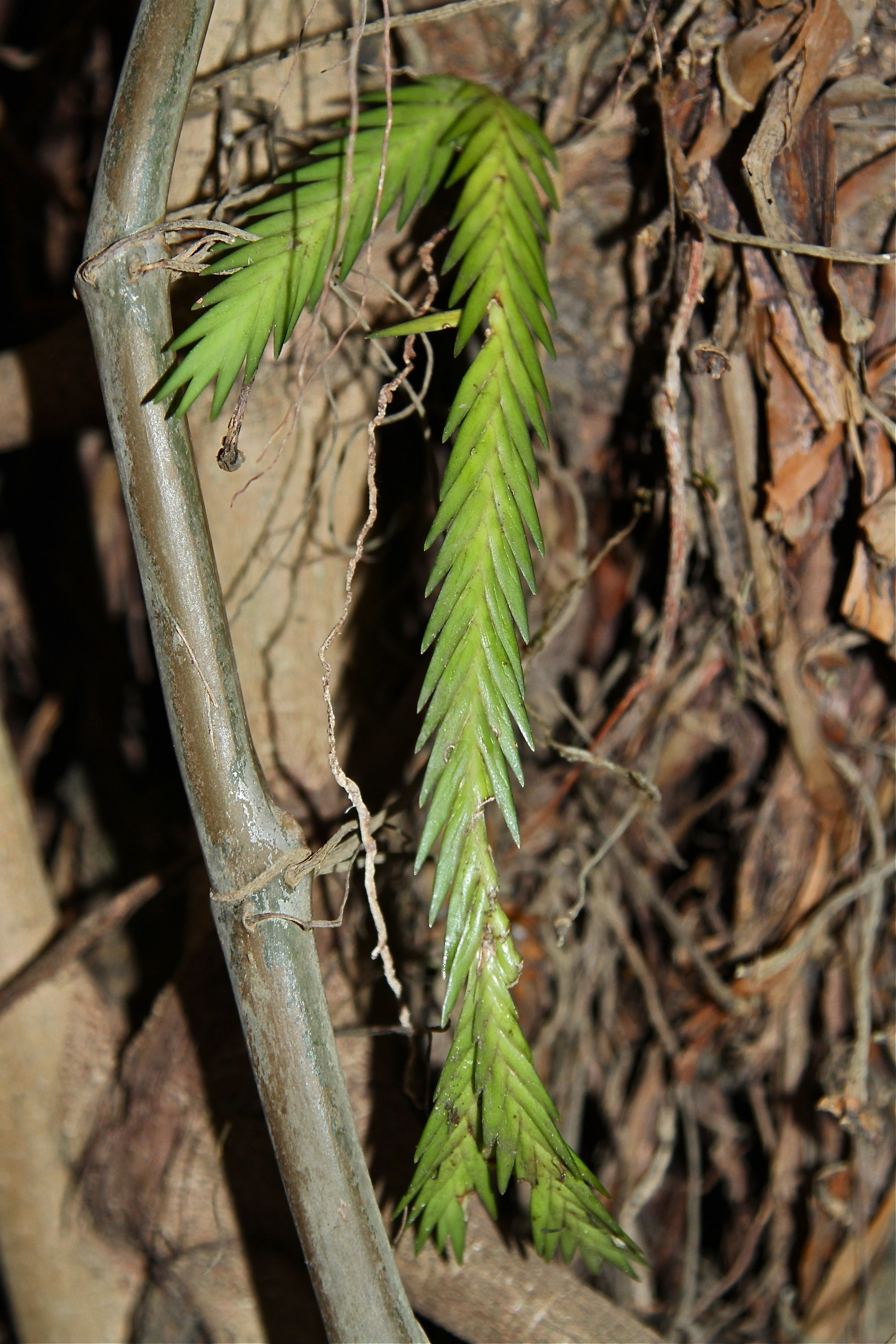

Conservation status
- Least Concern (IUCN 3.1)

Scientific classification
- Kingdom: Plantae
- Clade: Tracheophytes
- Clade: Angiosperms
- Clade: Monocots
- Order: Asparagales
- Family: Orchidaceae
- Subfamily: Epidendroideae
- Genus: Angraecum
- Species: A. podochiloides

Binomial name
- Angraecum podochiloides Schltr.

= Angraecum podochiloides =

Species of orchid

Angraecum podochiloides is a species of comet orchid that can be found in Cameroon, the Democratic Republic of the Congo, Côte d'Ivoire, Equatorial Guinea, Gabon, Ghana, Liberia and Nigeria. It can be found in dense lowland forests on Gilbertiodendron dewevrei, and in humid forests at higher elevations or low montane forests. It is an epiphyte on Dialium corbisieri or in periodically flooded marshes with Guibourtia.
