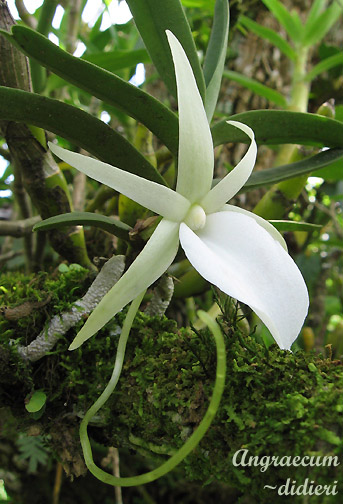

Conservation status
- Endangered (IUCN 3.1)
- CITES Appendix II

Scientific classification
- Kingdom: Plantae
- Clade: Tracheophytes
- Clade: Angiosperms
- Clade: Monocots
- Order: Asparagales
- Family: Orchidaceae
- Subfamily: Epidendroideae
- Genus: Angraecum
- Species: A. didieri

Binomial name
- Angraecum didieri (Baill. ex Finet) Schltr. (1915)

Synonyms
- Macroplectrum didieri Baill. ex Finet (1907) (Basionym); Perrierangraecum didieri (Baill. ex Finet) Szlach., Mytnik & Grochocka

= Angraecum didieri =

Species of orchid

Angraecum didieri is a species of flowering plant in the family Orchidaceae.
