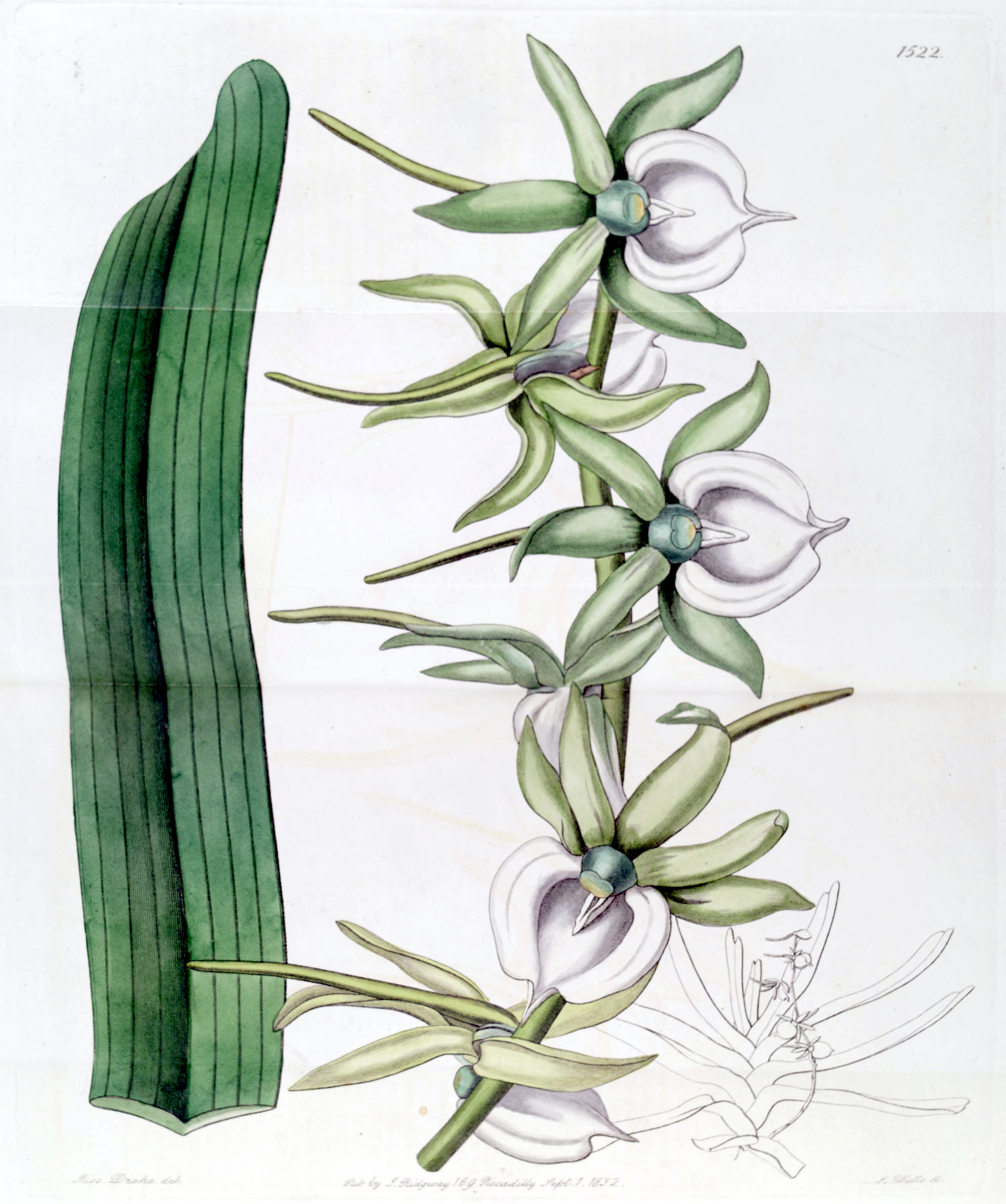

Scientific classification
- Kingdom: Plantae
- Clade: Embryophytes
- Clade: Tracheophytes
- Clade: Angiosperms
- Clade: Monocots
- Order: Asparagales
- Family: Orchidaceae
- Subfamily: Epidendroideae
- Genus: Angraecum
- Species: A. eburneum

Binomial name
- Angraecum eburneum Bory (1804)

Synonyms
- Limodorum eburneum (Bory) Willd. (1805); Angorchis eburnea (Bory) Kuntze (1891)

= Angraecum eburneum =

Species of orchid

Angraecum eburneum is a species of orchid. Their common name the "comet orchid". They generally grow up to 2 metres (6 ft 7 in) in height and grows 10 to 15 flowers per plant. They are native to Madagascar, Comoros, Seychelles, Réunion, Mauritius, Kenya, and Tanzania. It is the national flower of Seychelles.

== Description ==
The white and green flower is 7.5 centimetres (3.0 in) in size and is said to give off a pleasant smell. Flowering begins in early winter and takes several months.

== Symbolism ==
Claire Waight Keller included the plant to represent Seychelles in Meghan Markle's wedding veil, which included the distinctive flora of each Commonwealth country.

== Gallery ==
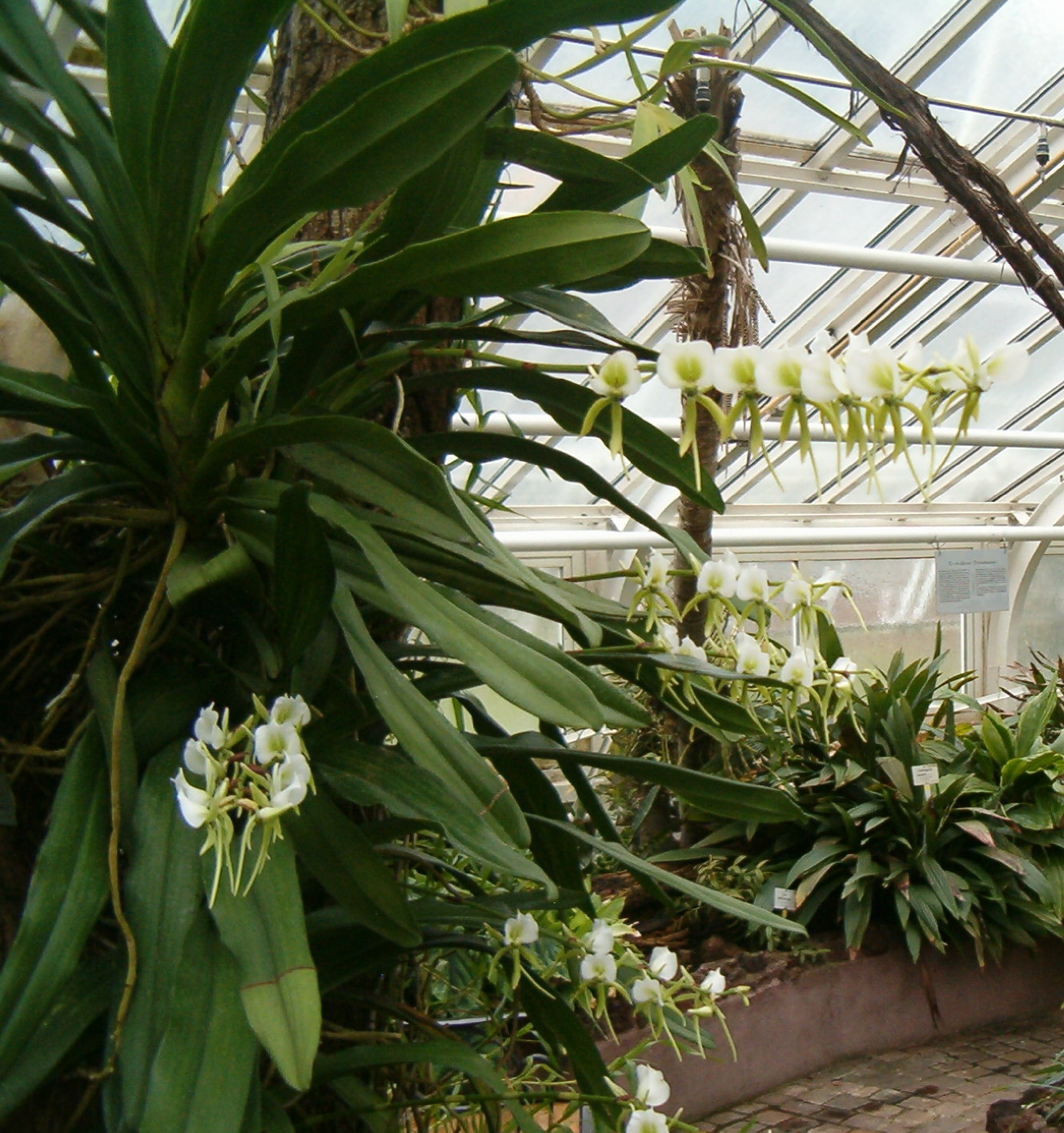
Mature Angraecum eburneum specimen cultivated in the Botanical Garden Berlin

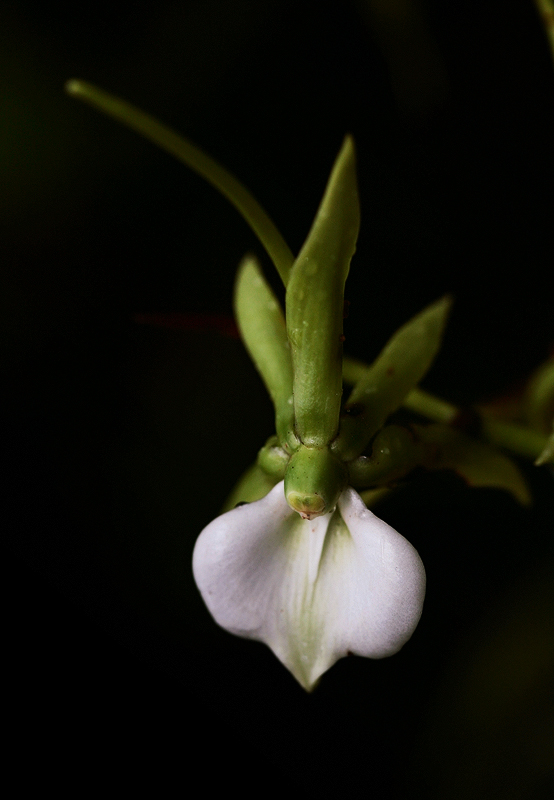
A close-up of a flower.

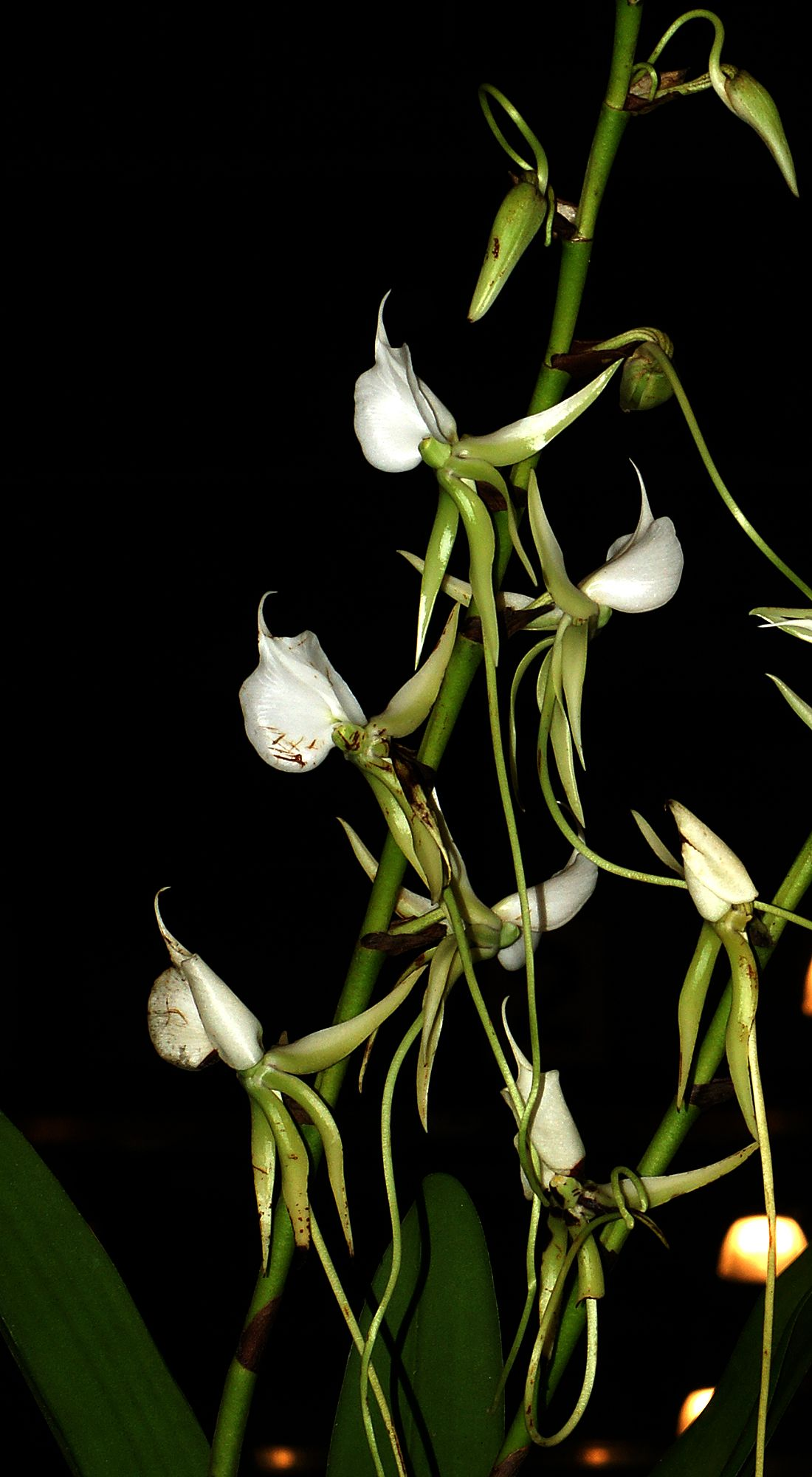
An image of the superbum subspecies.

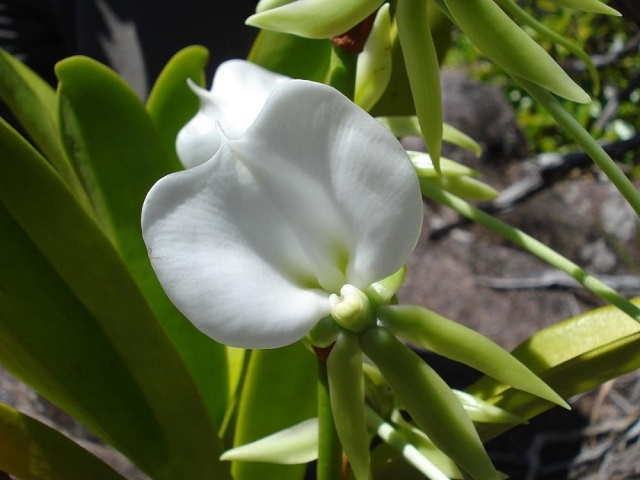
A close-up of a flower.
