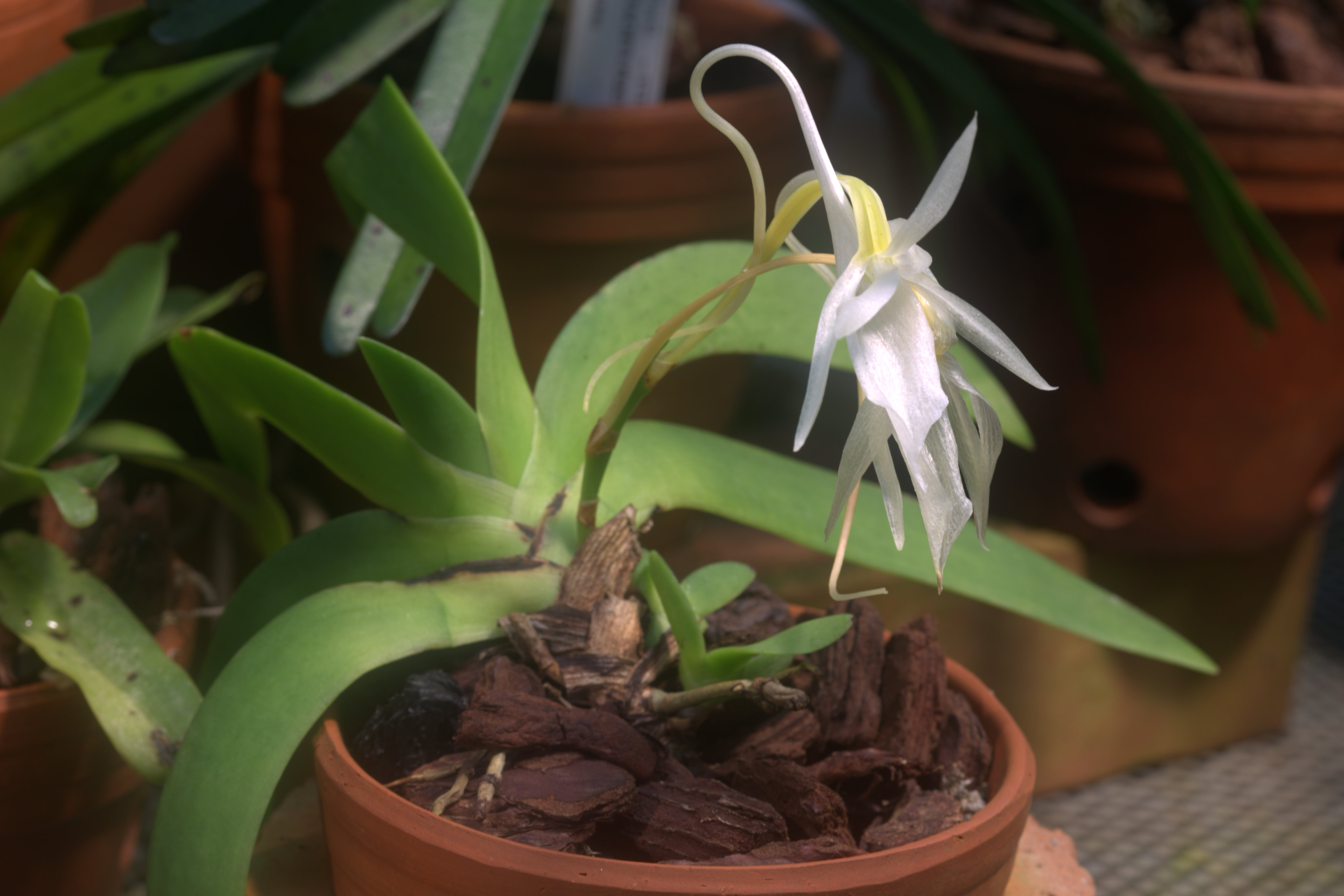
- Flowering Angraecum leonis specimen cultivated at the Gothenburg Botanical Garden
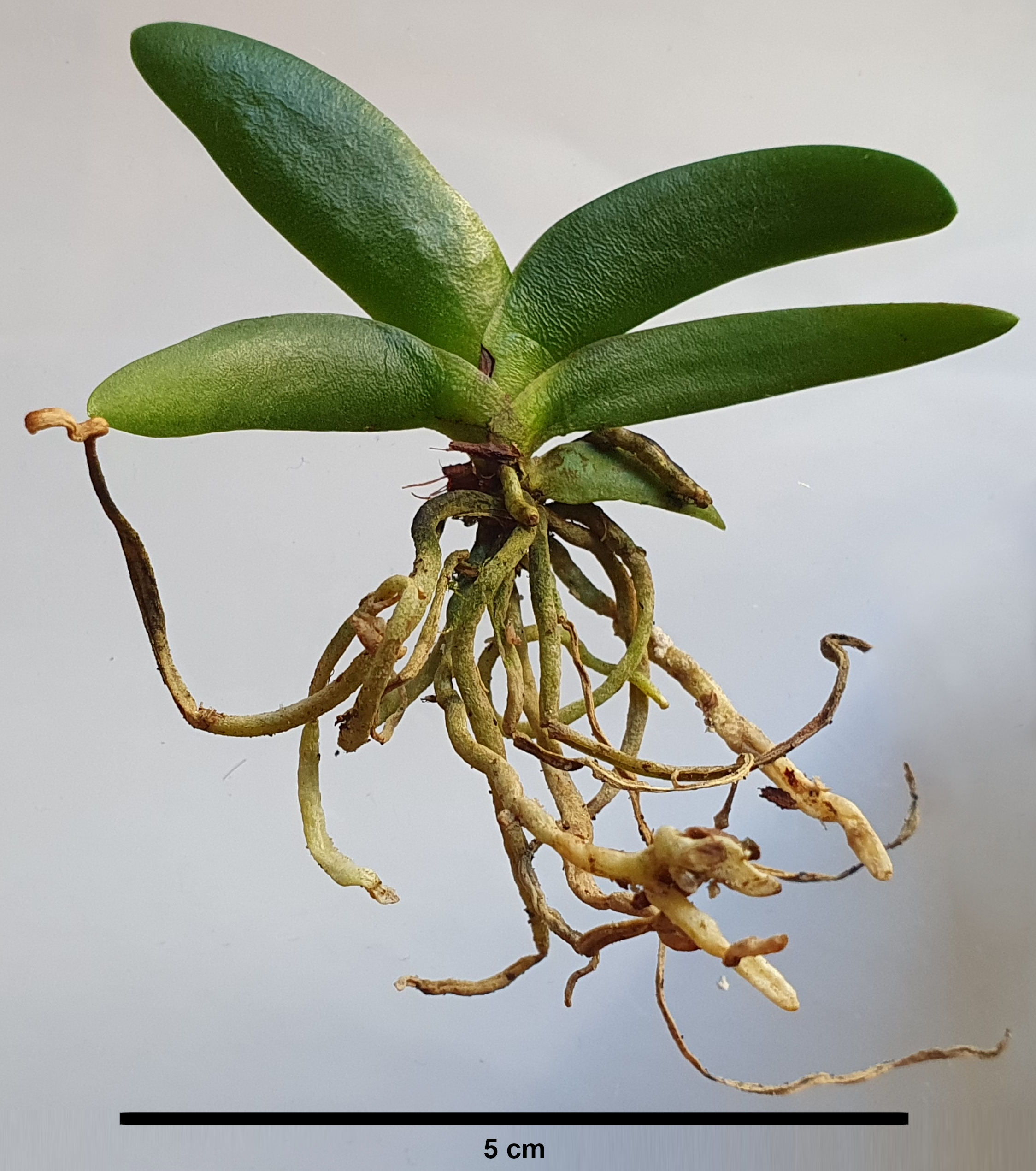
- Immature Angraecum leonis specimen

Scientific classification
- Kingdom: Plantae
- Clade: Embryophytes
- Clade: Tracheophytes
- Clade: Spermatophytes
- Clade: Angiosperms
- Clade: Monocots
- Order: Asparagales
- Family: Orchidaceae
- Subfamily: Epidendroideae
- Genus: Angraecum
- Species: A. leonis

Binomial name
- Angraecum leonis (Rchb.f.) André (1885)

Synonyms
- Aeranthes leonis Rchb.f. (1885) (Basionym); Aeranthes leonii Rchb.f. (1885); Angraecum humboltii Rchb.f. (1885); Angraecum humblotii Rchb.f. ex Rolfe (1894); Mystacidium leonis (Rchb.f.) Rolfe (1904); Macroplectrum leonis (Rchb.f.) Finet (1907); Humblotiangraecum leonis (André) Szlach., Mytnik & Grochocka (2013)

= Angraecum leonis =

Species of plant

Angraecum leonis is a species of flowering plant in the family Orchidaceae.

== Description ==
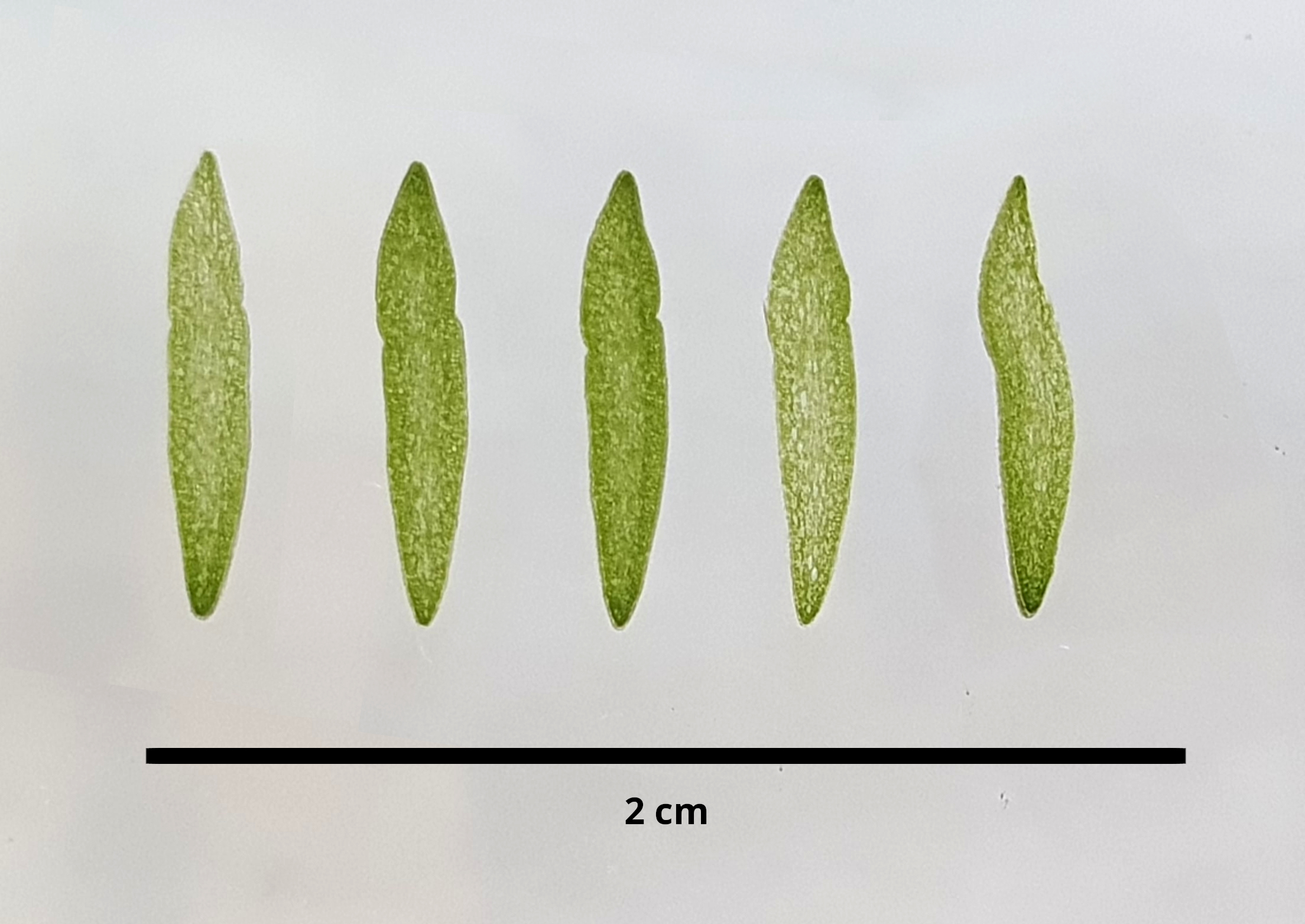
Cross section of immature Angraecum leonis leaf

== Forms ==
Two different forms of this species exist. The form native to the Comoros is considerably larger and nearly twice as big as the one native to Madagascar.

== Cytology ==
The diploid chromosome count of this species is 2n = 40, or 2n = 38.

== Ecology ==
=== Pollination ===
The sphingophilous flowers are fragrant during the night.

== Etymology ==
It is named after Léon Humblot, a French orchid collector.

== Physiology ==
=== Floral fragrance ===
The floral fragrance is primarily composed of chavicol (70%), followed by benzyl salicylate (7.3%), benzyl benzoate (5.5%), methyl nicotinate (5.3%), as well as many more compounds in smaller quantities.

Chavicol , the main component of the floral fragrance of Angraecum leonis

== Horticulture ==
It can be successfully cultivated in intermediate temperatures. It can be mounted on cork and bark, but it can also grow potted in bark pieces. It should be grown in shade to semi-shade.

== Images ==
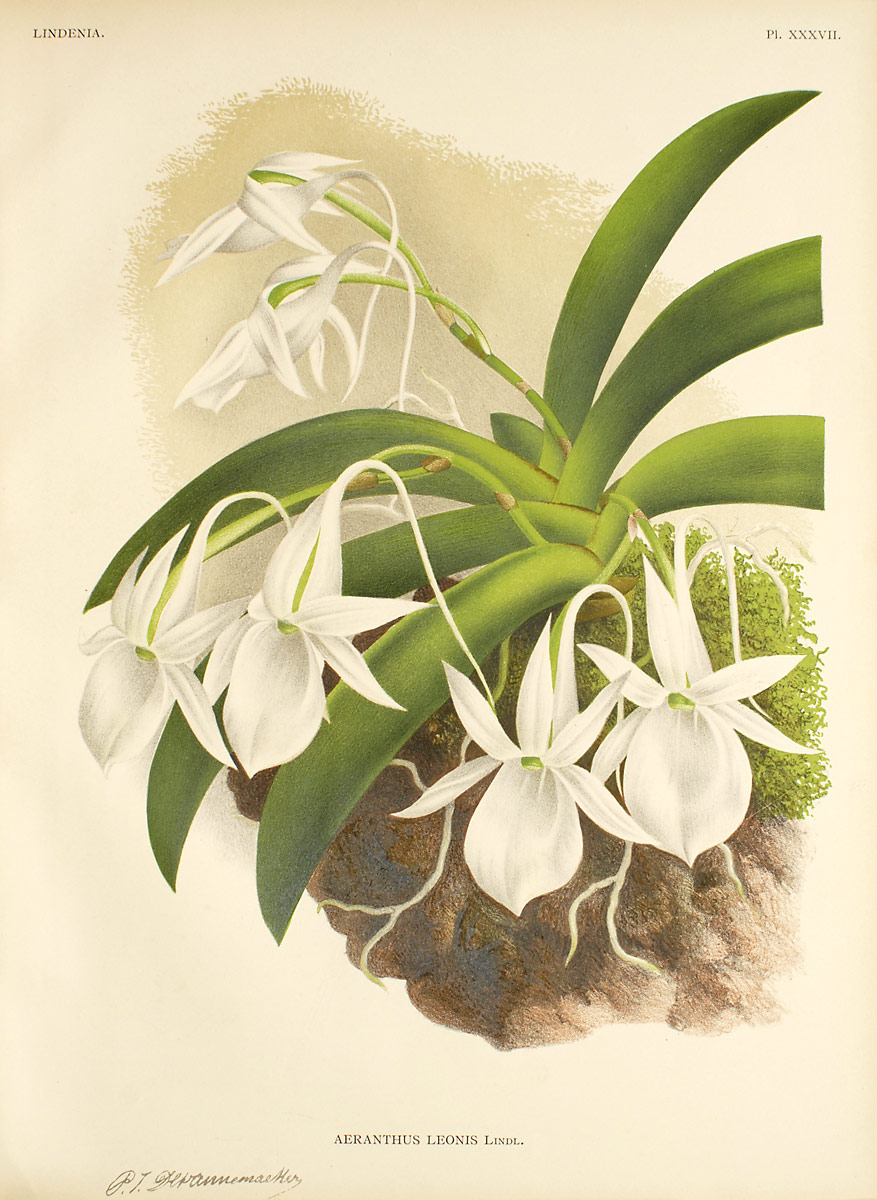
