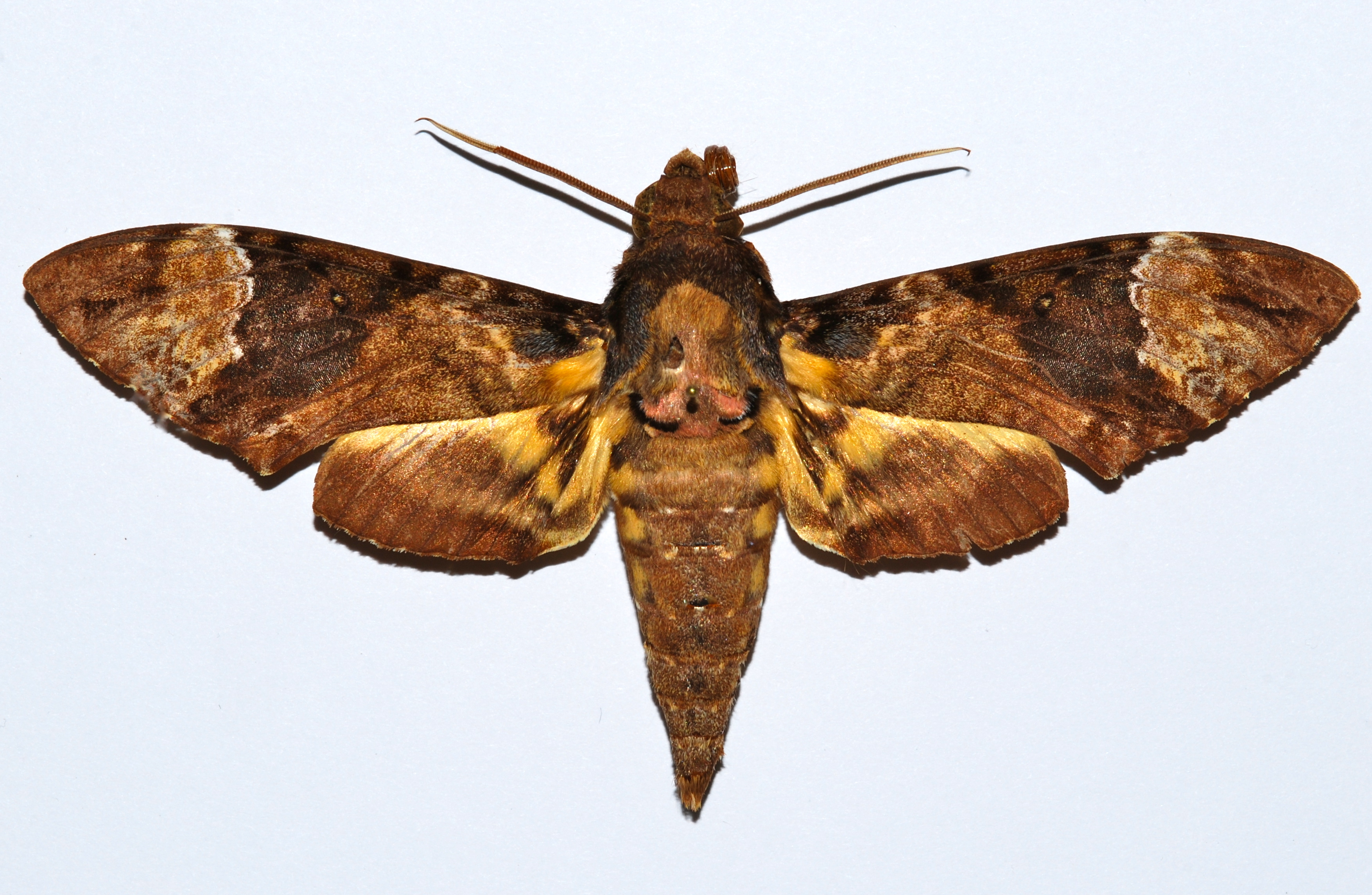
- Coelonia solani

Scientific classification
- Domain: Eukaryota
- Kingdom: Animalia
- Phylum: Arthropoda
- Class: Insecta
- Order: Lepidoptera
- Family: Sphingidae
- Tribe: Acherontiini
- Genus: Coelonia; Rothschild & Jordan, 1903

= Coelonia =

Genus of moths

Coelonia is a genus of moths in the family Sphingidae. The genus was erected by Walter Rothschild and Karl Jordan in 1903.

== Species ==
- Coelonia brevis Rothschild & Jordan 1915
- Coelonia fulvinotata (Butler 1875)
- Coelonia solani (Boisduval 1833)
