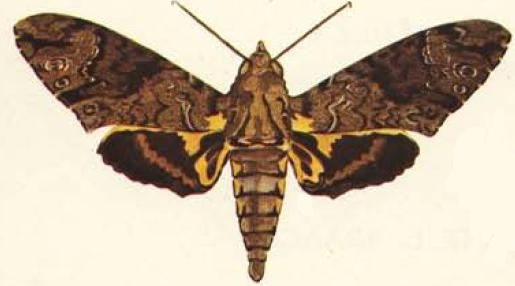

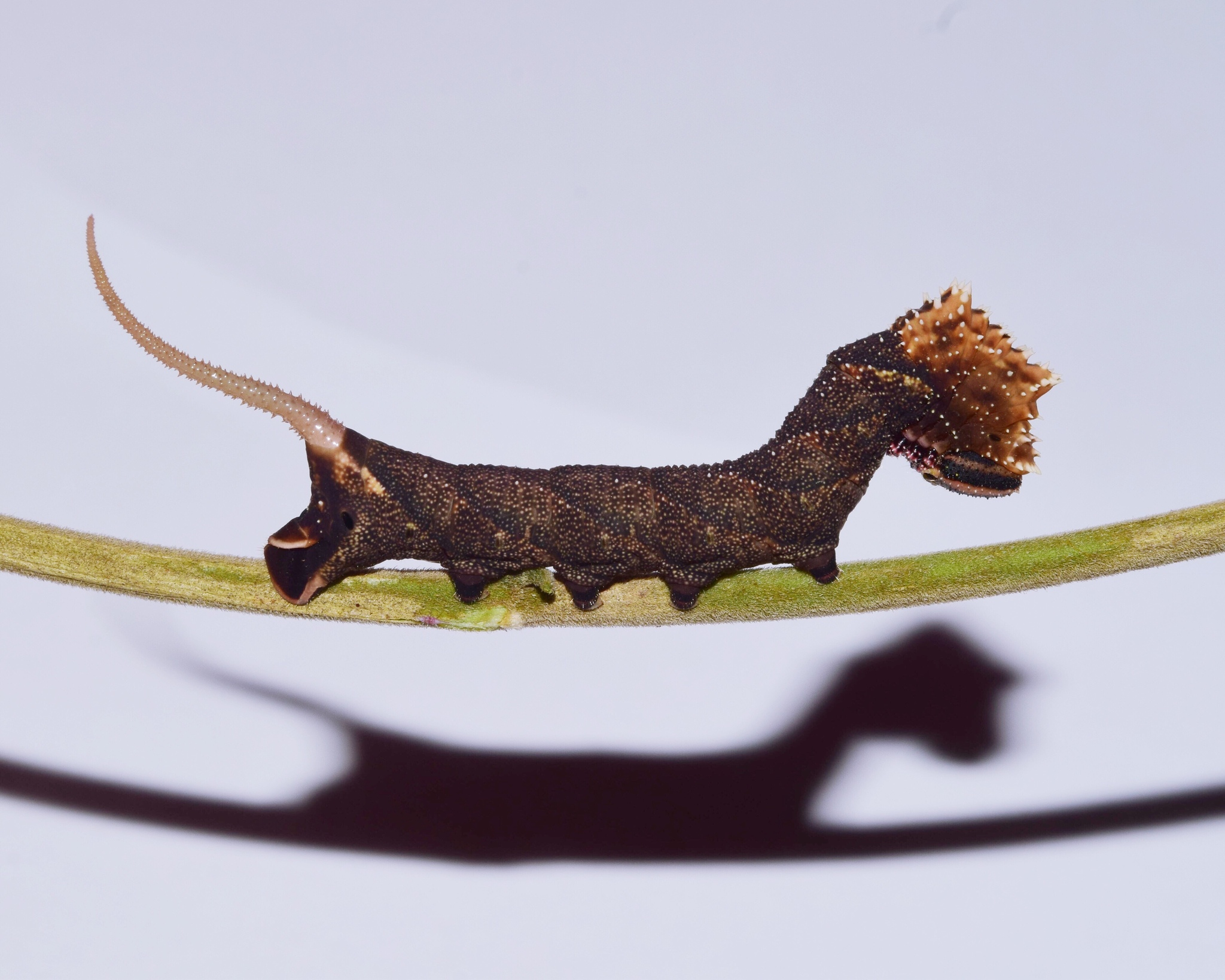

Scientific classification
- Kingdom: Animalia
- Phylum: Arthropoda
- Clade: Pancrustacea
- Class: Insecta
- Order: Lepidoptera
- Family: Sphingidae
- Genus: Coelonia
- Species: C. fulvinotata

Binomial name
- Coelonia fulvinotata (Butler, 1875)

Synonyms
- Protoparce fulvinotata Butler, 1875; Protoparce mauritii Butler, 1876; Coelonia mauritii; Macrosila solani Walker, 1856; Sphinx solani Herrich-Schäffer, 1854

= Coelonia fulvinotata =

Species of moth

Coelonia fulvinotata (also known as the fulvous hawk) is a moth of the family Sphingidae first described by Arthur Gardiner Butler in 1875. It is known from most habitats throughout the Afrotropical realm, from the Gambia east to Ethiopia and south to northern South Africa and Madagascar.

== Description ==
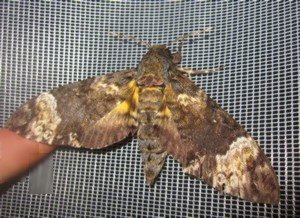

The length of the forewing is 52–55 mm for males and the wingspan is 101–111 mm.

== Ecology ==
The larvae feed on Lantana camara, Fraxinus floribunda, Clerodendrum heterophyllum, Dahlia variabilis and Duranta plumieri. Adults are pollinators of some species of baobab in Madagascar, including Adansonia za.

== Subspecies ==
- Coelonia fulvinotata fulvinotata
- Coelonia fulvinotata nigrescens Basquin, 1992 (São Tomé and Príncipe)
