= Megacorma remota =

Scientific classification
- Domain: Eukaryota
- Kingdom: Animalia
- Phylum: Arthropoda
- Class: Insecta
- Order: Lepidoptera
- Family: Sphingidae
- Genus: Megacorma
- Species: M. remota

Binomial name
- Megacorma remota Jordan, 1924

Species of moth

Megacorma remota is a moth of the family Sphingidae. It is known from Papua New Guinea.
