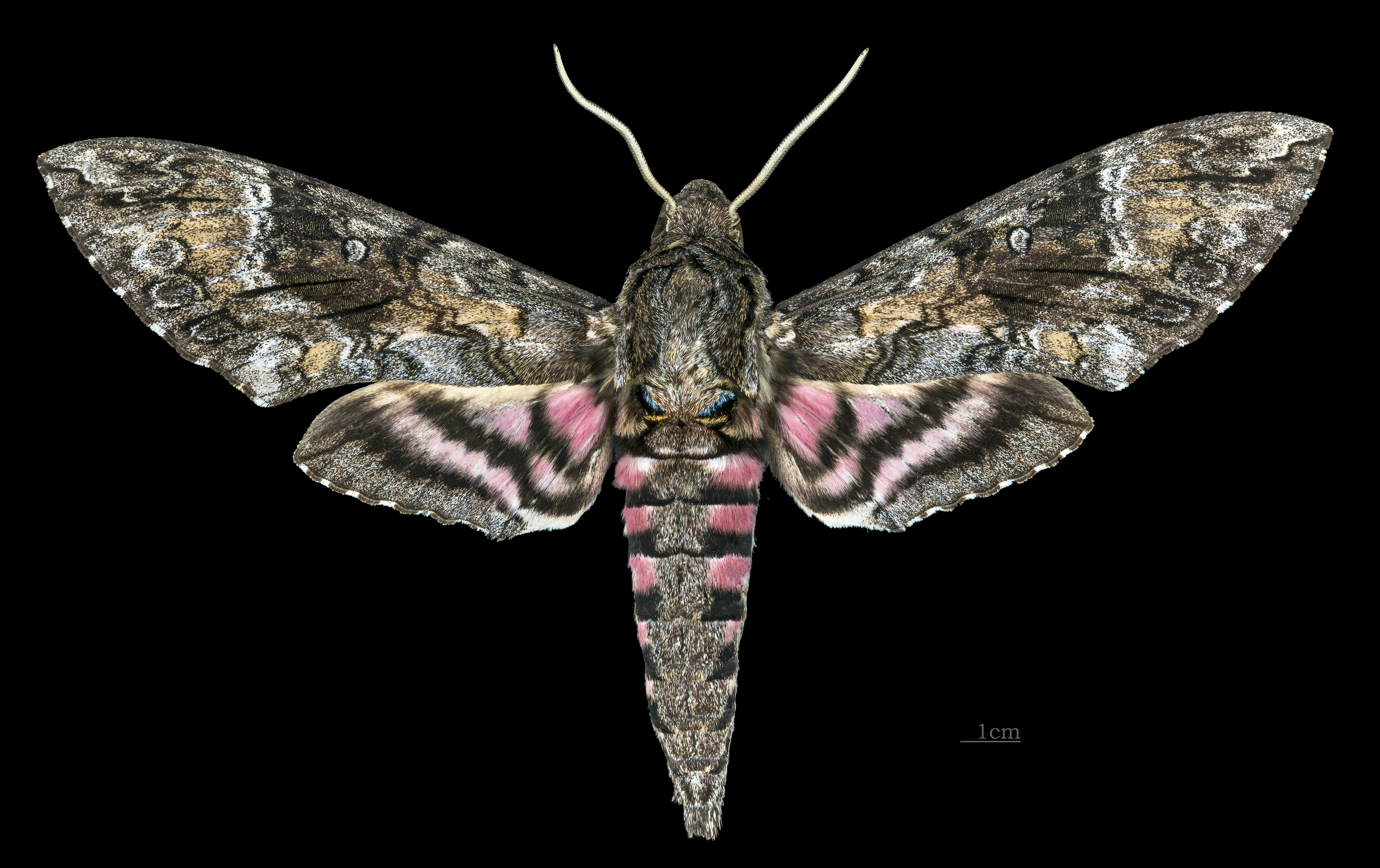
- Agrius cingulata

Scientific classification
- Domain: Eukaryota
- Kingdom: Animalia
- Phylum: Arthropoda
- Class: Insecta
- Order: Lepidoptera
- Family: Sphingidae
- Subfamily: Sphinginae
- Tribe: Acherontiini; Boisduval, 1875

Genera
- See text

= Acherontiini =

Tribe of moths

Acherontiini is a tribe of moths of the family Sphingidae.

== Taxonomy ==
- Genus Acherontia
- Genus Agrius
- Genus Callosphingia
- Genus Coelonia
- Genus Megacorma
