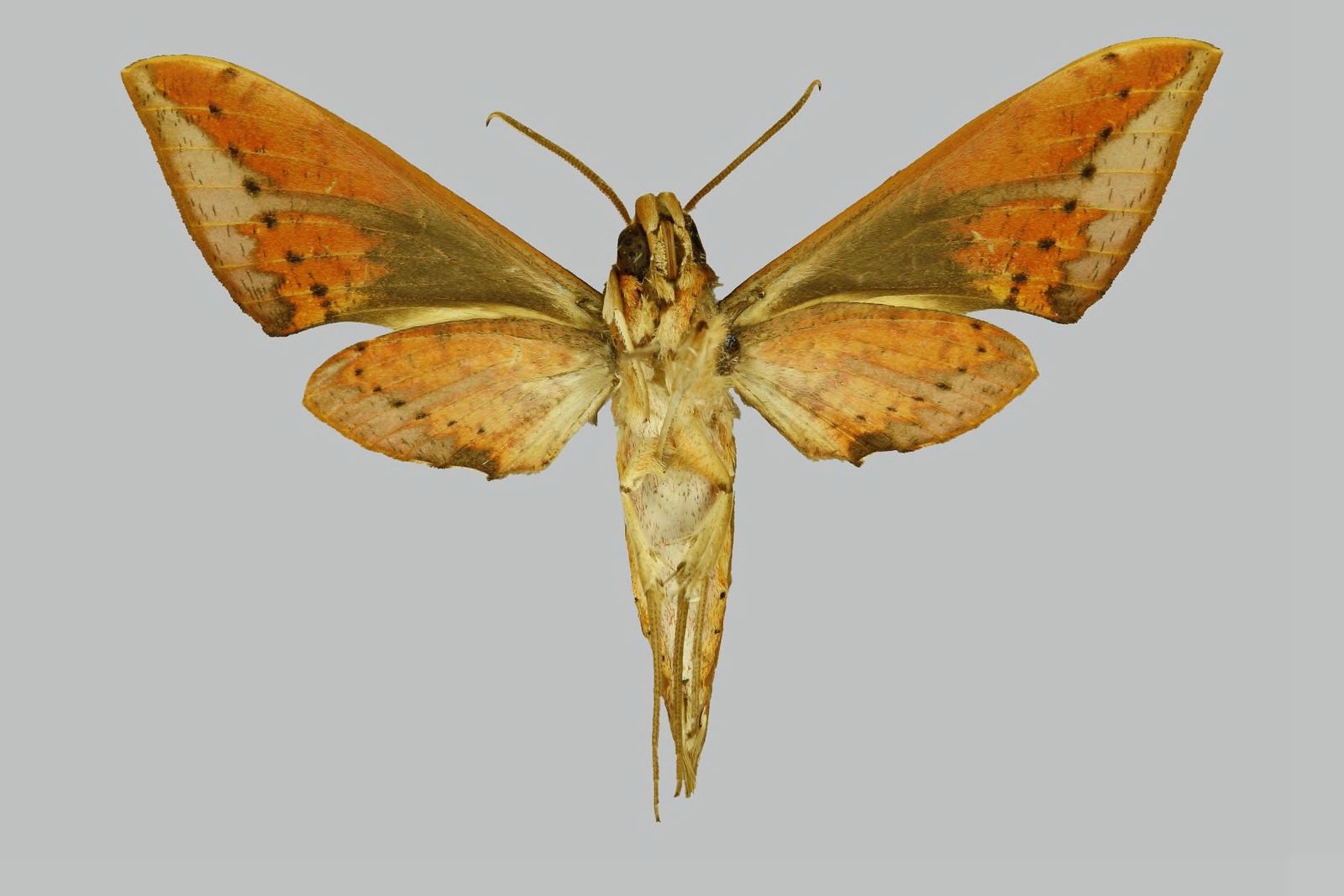
- Megacorma schroederi, Natural History Museum, London

Scientific classification
- Kingdom: Animalia
- Phylum: Arthropoda
- Class: Insecta
- Order: Lepidoptera
- Family: Sphingidae
- Genus: Megacorma
- Species: M. schroederi

Binomial name
- Megacorma schroederi Eitschberger, 1999

= Megacorma schroederi =

Species of moth

Megacorma schroederi is a moth of the family Sphingidae. It is known from Sulawesi in Indonesia.
