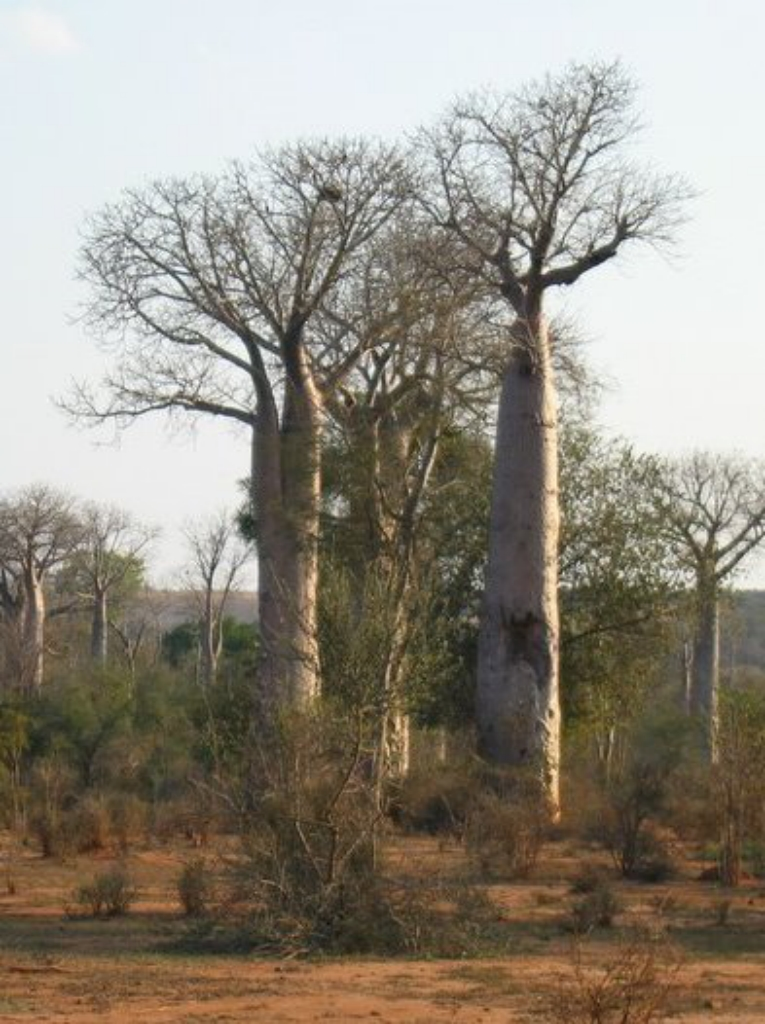

Conservation status
- Least Concern (IUCN 3.1)

Scientific classification
- Kingdom: Plantae
- Clade: Tracheophytes
- Clade: Angiosperms
- Clade: Eudicots
- Clade: Rosids
- Order: Malvales
- Family: Malvaceae
- Genus: Adansonia
- Species: A. za

Binomial name
- Adansonia za Baill.

Synonyms
- Adansonia bozy Jum. & H.Perrier (1910); Adansonia za var. bozy (Jum. & H.Perrier) H.Perrier (1952); Adansonia alba Jum. & H.Perrier (1909); Adansonia za var. boinensis H.Perrier (1952)

= Adansonia za =

Species of flowering plant

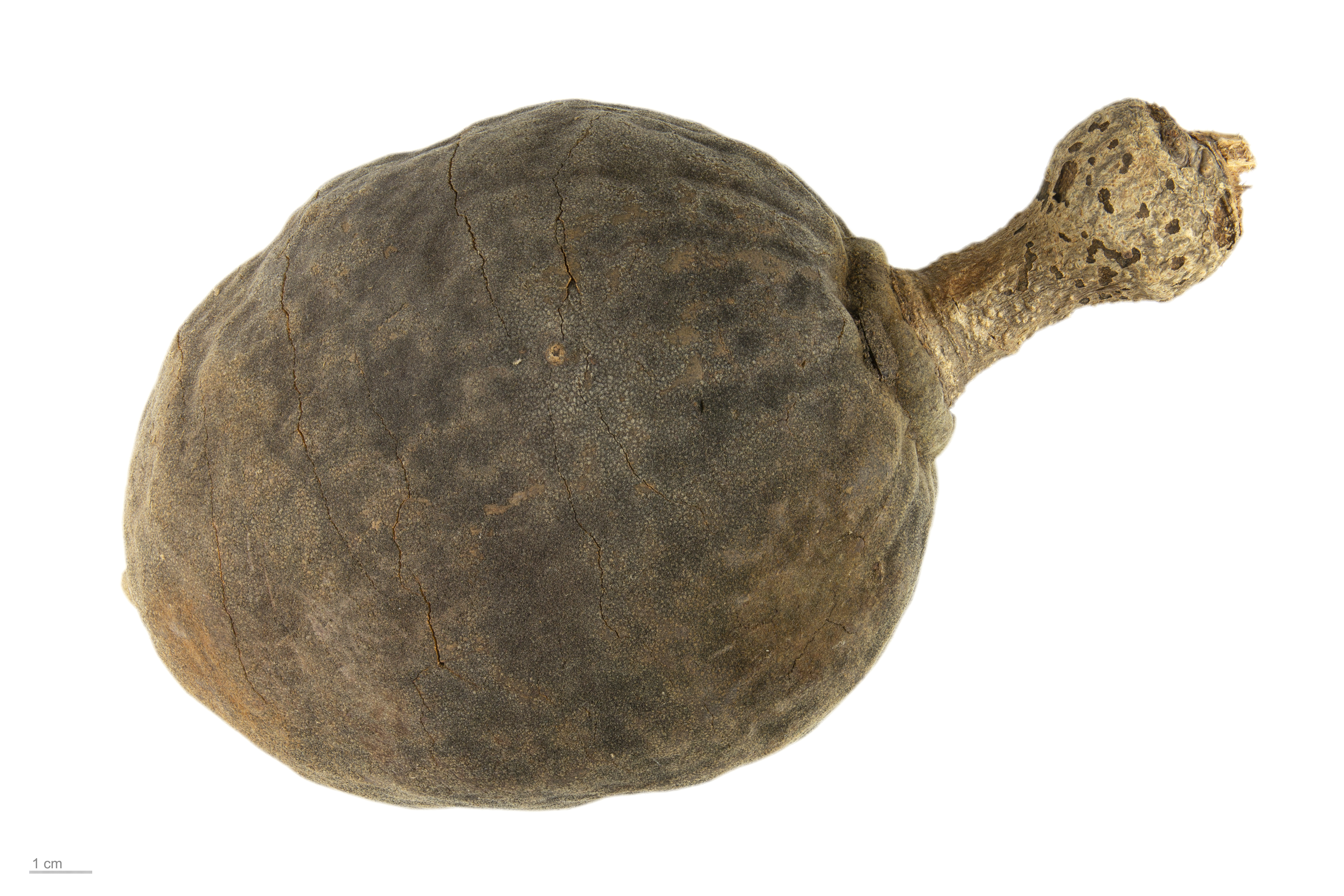
Adansonia za (MHNT)

Adansonia za is a species of baobab in the genus Adansonia of the family Malvaceae (previously included in the Bombacaceae). It was originally named in French as anadzahé. Common names in Malagasy include bojy, boringy, bozy, bozybe, ringy, and za, the last of which gives the plant its specific epithet. Eight Adansonia species are recognized, with six endemic to Madagascar. Adansonia za is the most widespread of the Madagascar endemics.

== Description ==
Adansonia za is a large thick-stemmed (pachycaul) deciduous tree, about 10–40 metres (33–131 ft) tall and about 6 metres (20 ft) in diameter. The trunk and branches have a brownish-rose colored hue. The tree is widest at the base, narrowing noticeably towards the top of the tree.

=== Leaves ===
Leaves are palmately lobed with 5 to 8 lobes per leaf. They are 5–10 centimetres (2.0–3.9 in) long and 1.5–2.5 centimetres (0.59–0.98 in) wide, but often bigger in trees in the northern part of the range, where the leaves can be up to 20 centimetres (7.9 in) long. The leaf margin is entire (without teeth).

=== Flowers ===
The flower buds are long green cylinders which can resemble oversized beans and could be mistaken for a fruit. Flowers open with or soon after the leaves emerge at the beginning of the wet season. The bud opens with the curling back of the outside layer of the flower bud, revealing yellow and red petals with long, yellowish stamens. The corolla is 15–20 centimetres (5.9–7.9 in) long and 1.2–1.5 centimetres (0.47–0.59 in) wide. Petals are 10–20 centimetres (3.9–7.9 in) long and 1.2–1.5 centimetres (0.47–0.59 in) wide. The flowers are musty-sweet scented. Flowering period extends from November to February. Flowers are usually pollinated by moths of the family Sphingidae including Coelonia solani, Coelonia brevis and Coelonia mauritii.

=== Fruits ===
Fruits are usually ovoid and 10–30 centimetres (3.9–11.8 in) long by 6–16 centimetres (2.4–6.3 in) wide. They have a blackish, tough, thick outer shell (pericarp). They contain kidney-shaped, laterally-flattened seeds. The seeds have an oil content of 11 percent. In southern populations, the fruits have a markedly thickened peduncle, but this feature is less prominent in northern populations.

== Distribution ==
Adansonia za is endemic to southern and north-western Madagascar. Populations are severely fragmented and numbers are declining due to habitat loss and logging.

== Habitat ==
This plant grows in arid scrublands, in deciduous forests, savannah and in Madagascar spiny forests. It prefers sunny areas and well drained soils, at an elevation up to 800 metres (2,600 ft) above sea level. It is the dominant tree in some of the southern deciduous forests, becoming less common to the north.

== Largest tree ==
Possibly the largest tree of this species (by circumference) grows near Reakaly village north-west from Ampanihy. The circumference of its trunk is approximately 23 metres (75 ft).

== Uses ==
The fruit pulp and roots of seedlings as well as the seeds are edible. Seeds contain 11% oil. Wood may be fed to cattle during droughts and the trunk can be hollowed out to store water. The bark fibre can be use for cloth or rope and the flowers may be used to sooth sore throats.

== Gallery ==
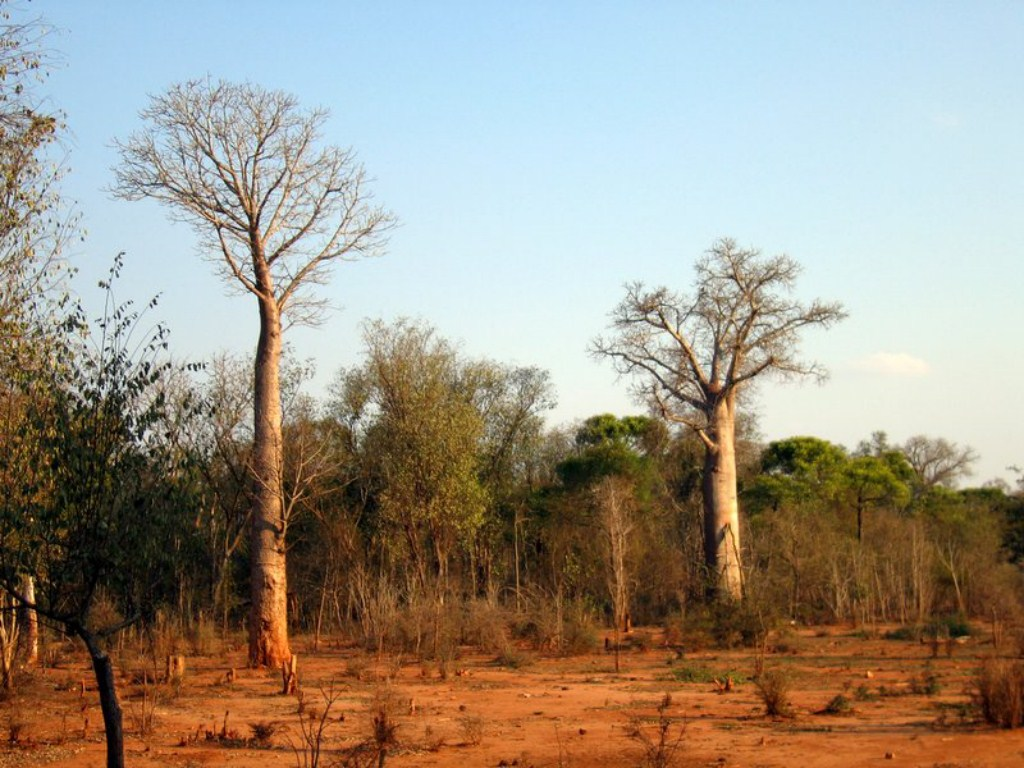
Plants of Adansonia za

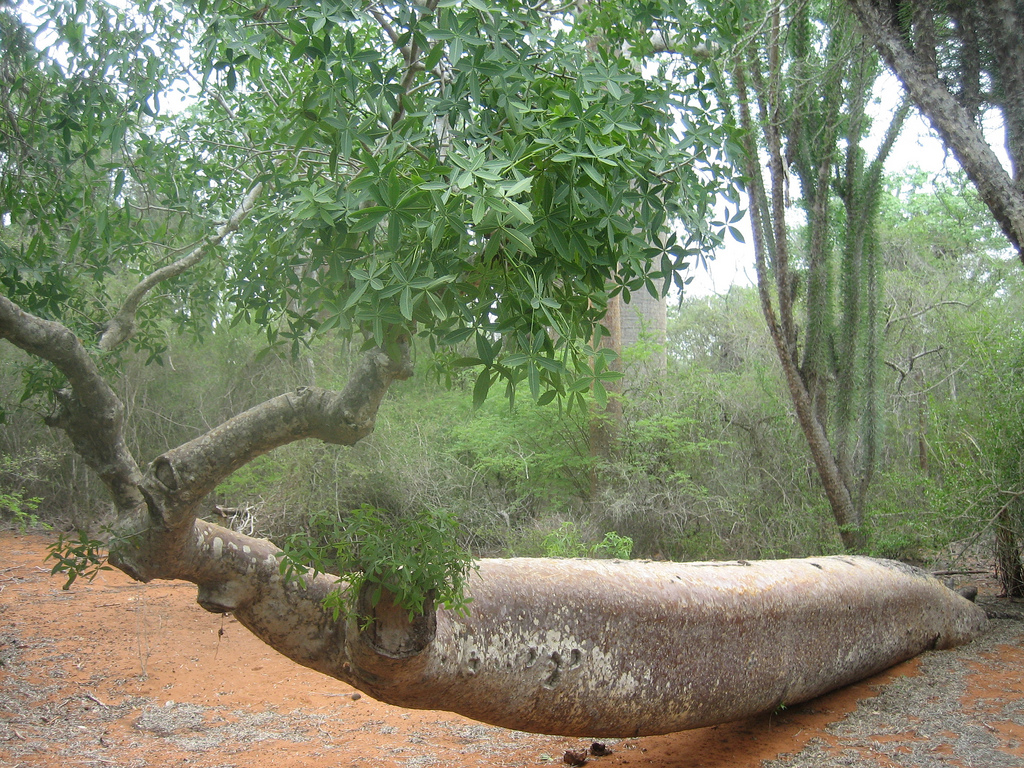
Leaning Adansonia za (with Didierea madagascariensis)

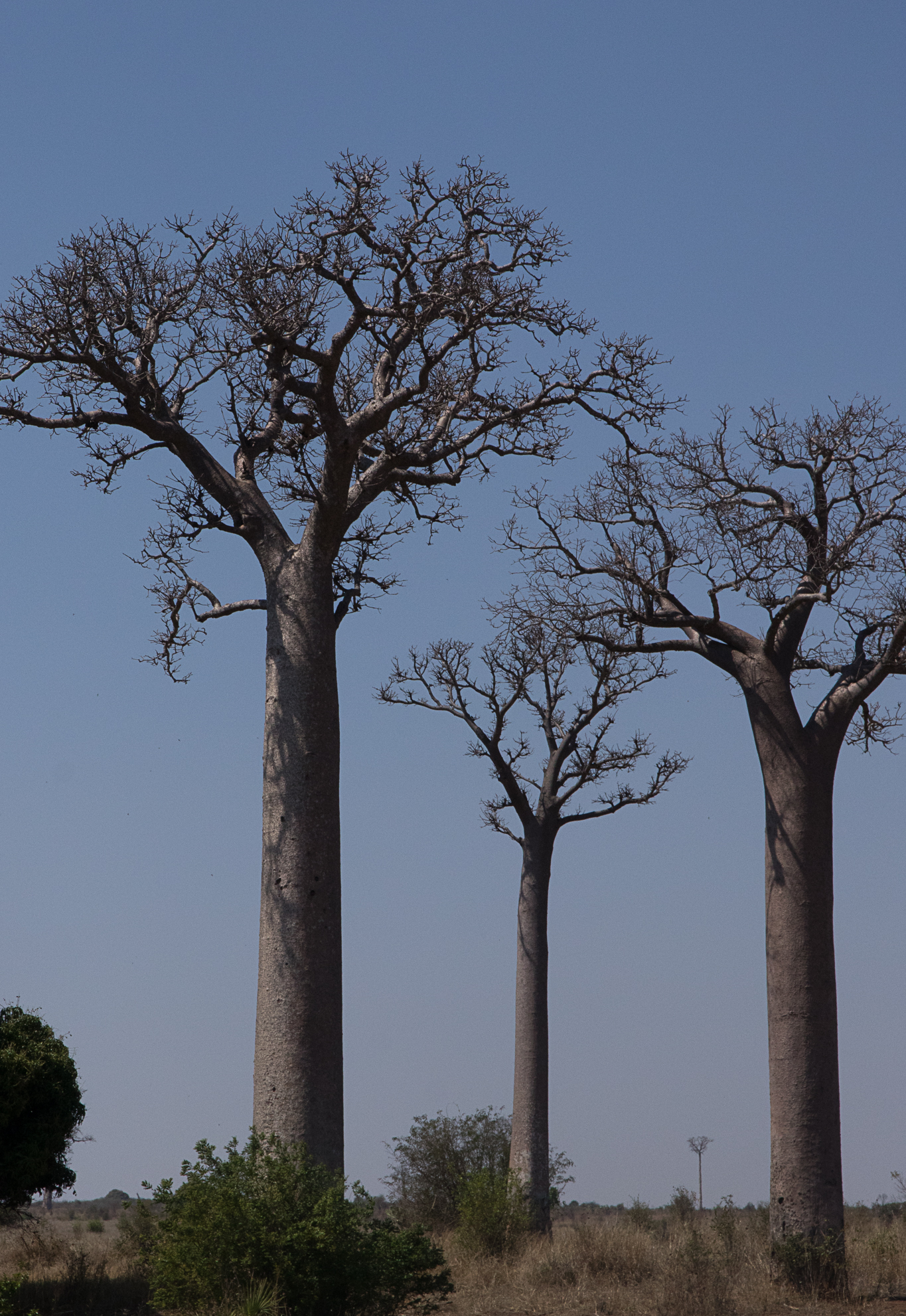
Adansonia za, southern Madagascar

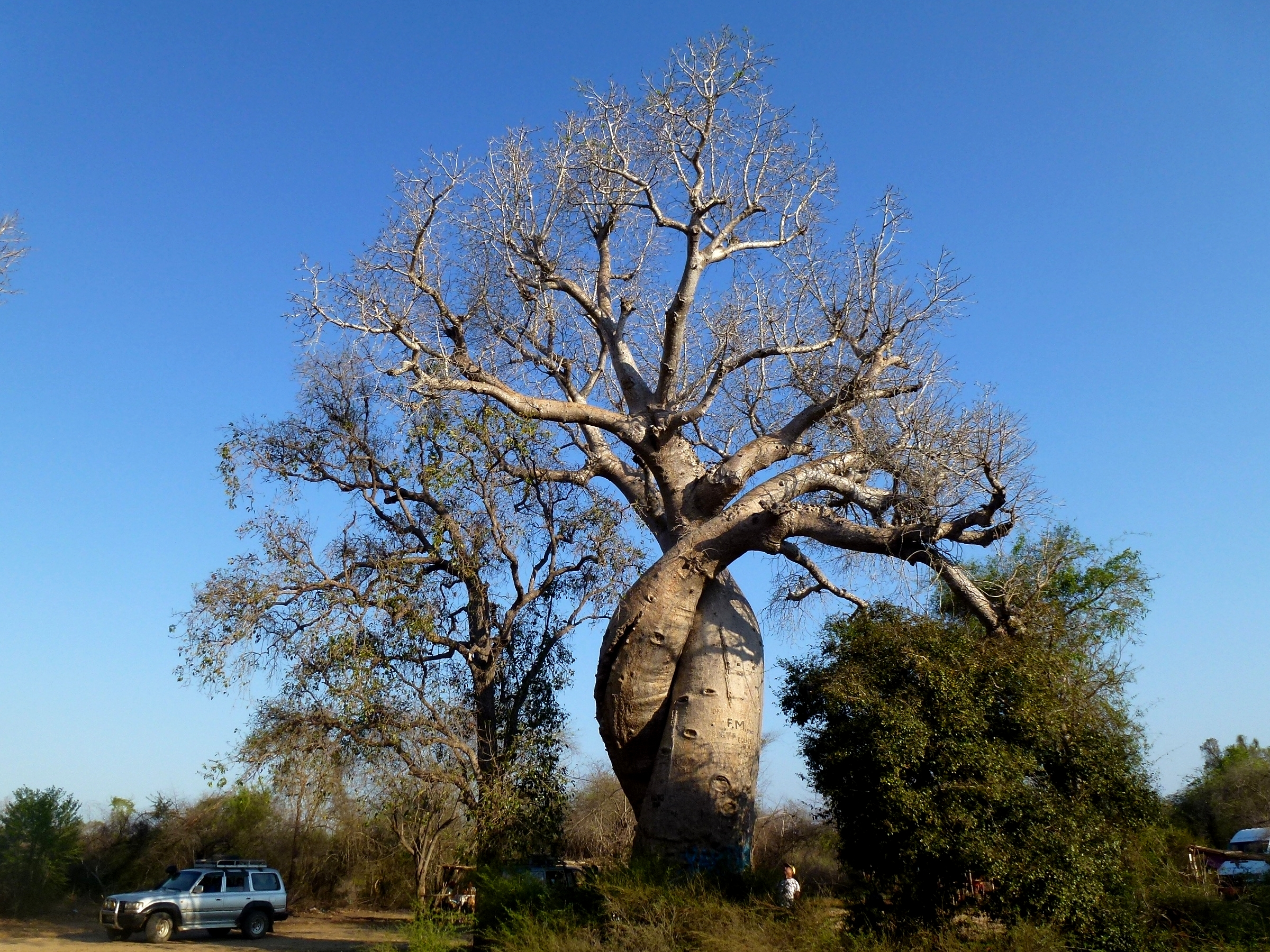
The "Baobab Amoureux", near Avenue of the Baobabs in Menabe, Madagascar
