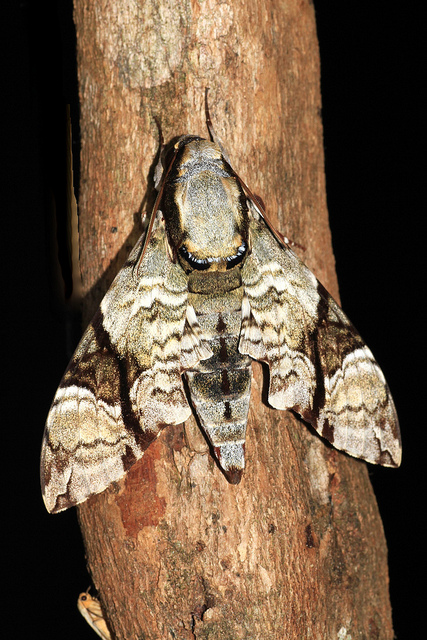
- Borneo, Mount Trusmadi

Scientific classification
- Domain: Eukaryota
- Kingdom: Animalia
- Phylum: Arthropoda
- Class: Insecta
- Order: Lepidoptera
- Family: Sphingidae
- Genus: Megacorma
- Species: M. obliqua

Binomial name
- Megacorma obliqua (Walker, 1856)

Synonyms
- Macrosila obliqua Walker, 1856; Sphinx nestor Boisduval, 1875

= Megacorma obliqua =

Species of moth

Megacorma obliqua, the black-belted hawkmoth, is a moth of the family Sphingidae.

== Distribution ==
It is known from Sri Lanka, north-eastern India, Myanmar, south-western China (Yunnan, Hainan), Thailand, northern Vietnam, Malaysia (Peninsular, Sarawak, Sabah), Indonesia (Sumatra, Kalimantan, Java, Ceram, Papua Barat), the Philippines (including Palawan), Papua New Guinea and the Solomon Islands.

== Description ==
The wingspan is 120–145 mm. It can be distinguished from all other Sphingidae species by the combination of the labial palp structure, long thorax and wing pattern.

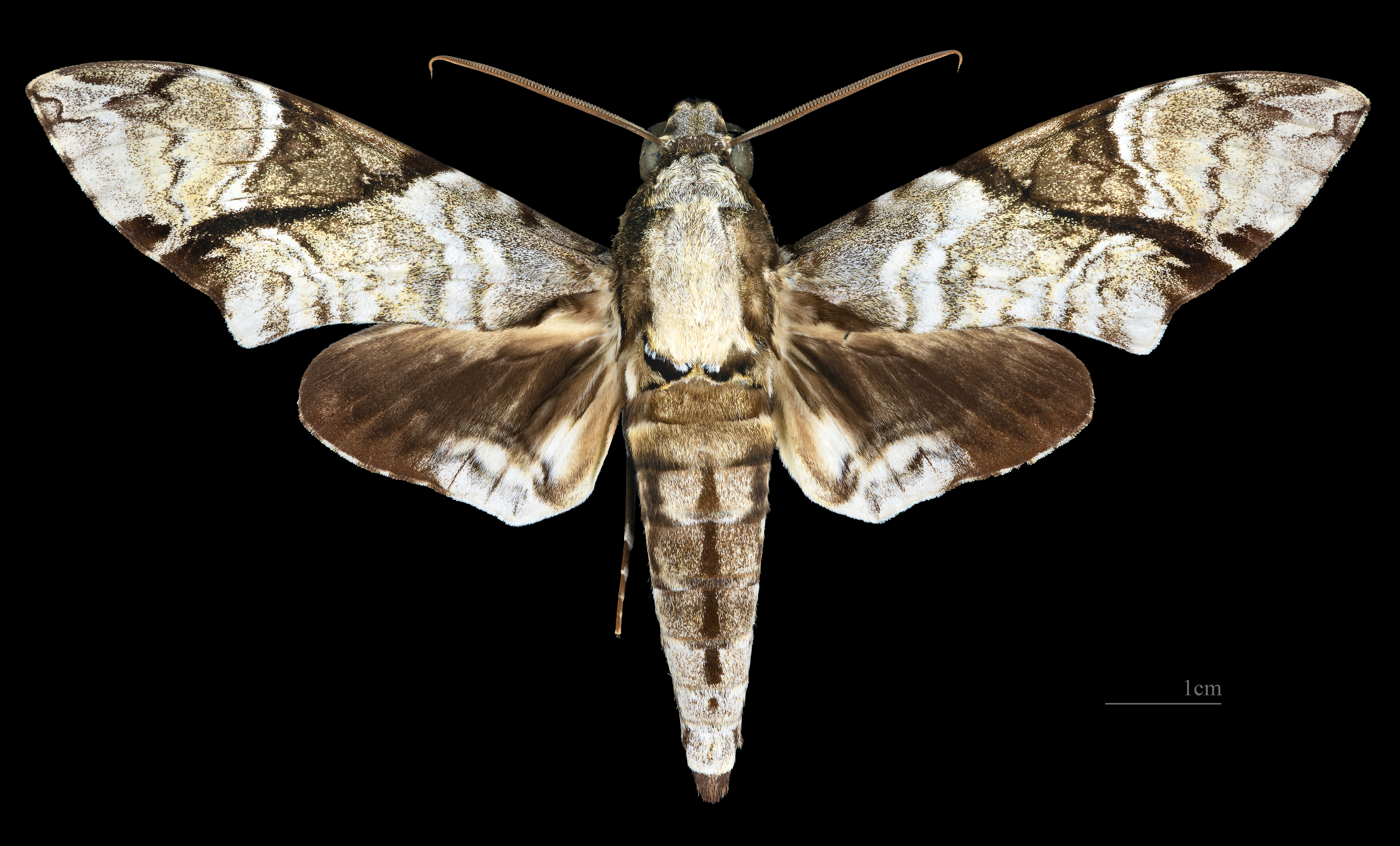
Male dorsal

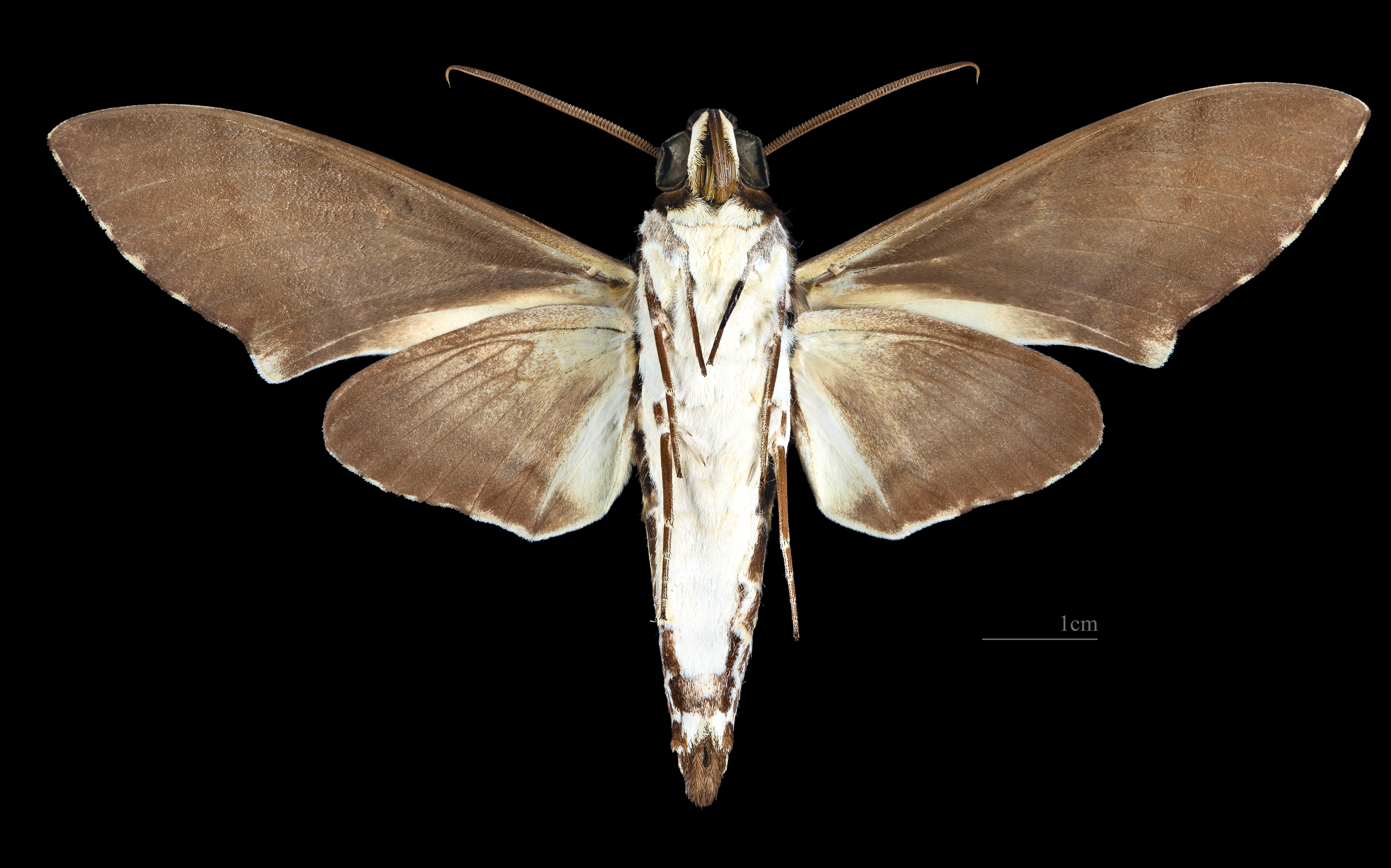
Male ventral

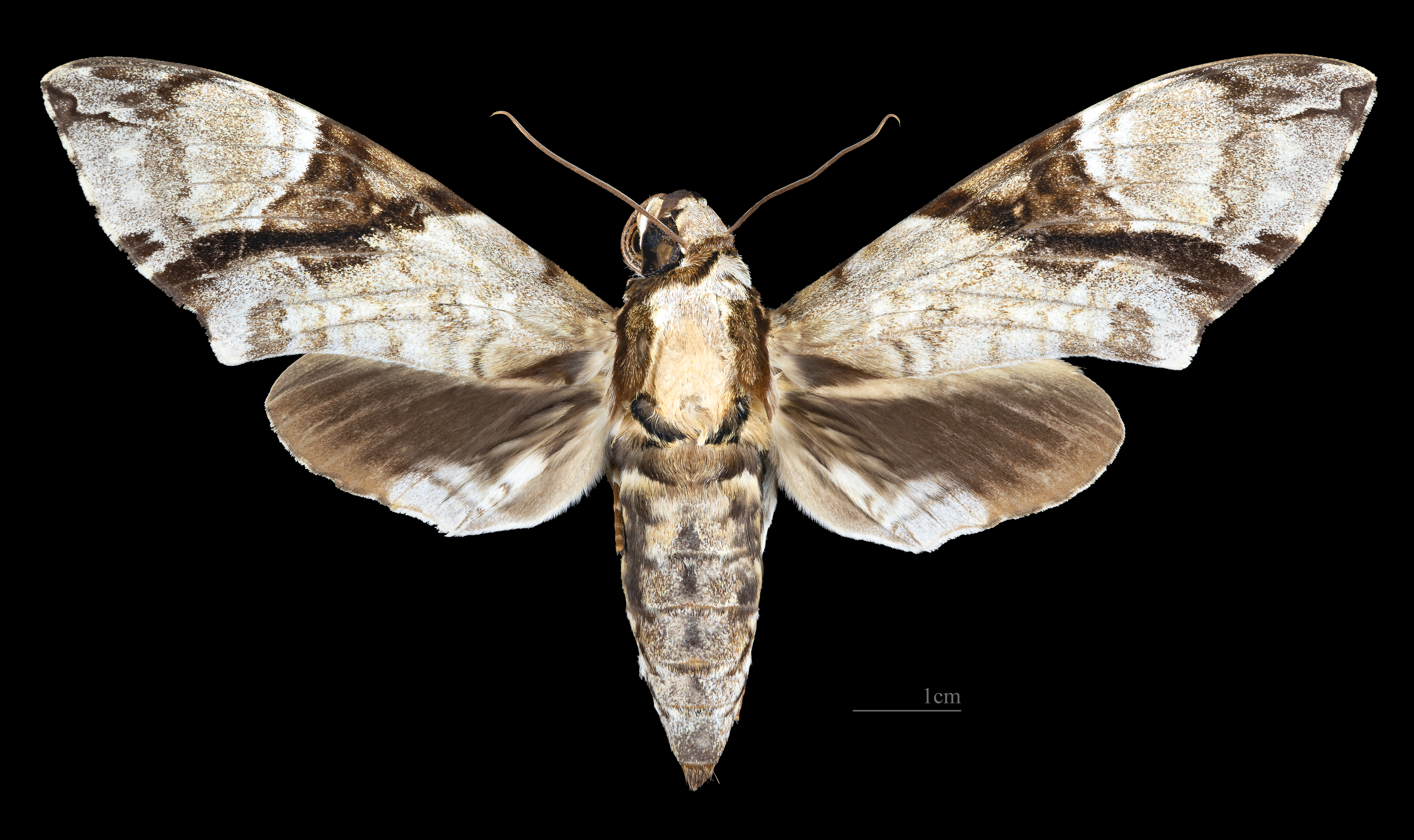
Female dorsal

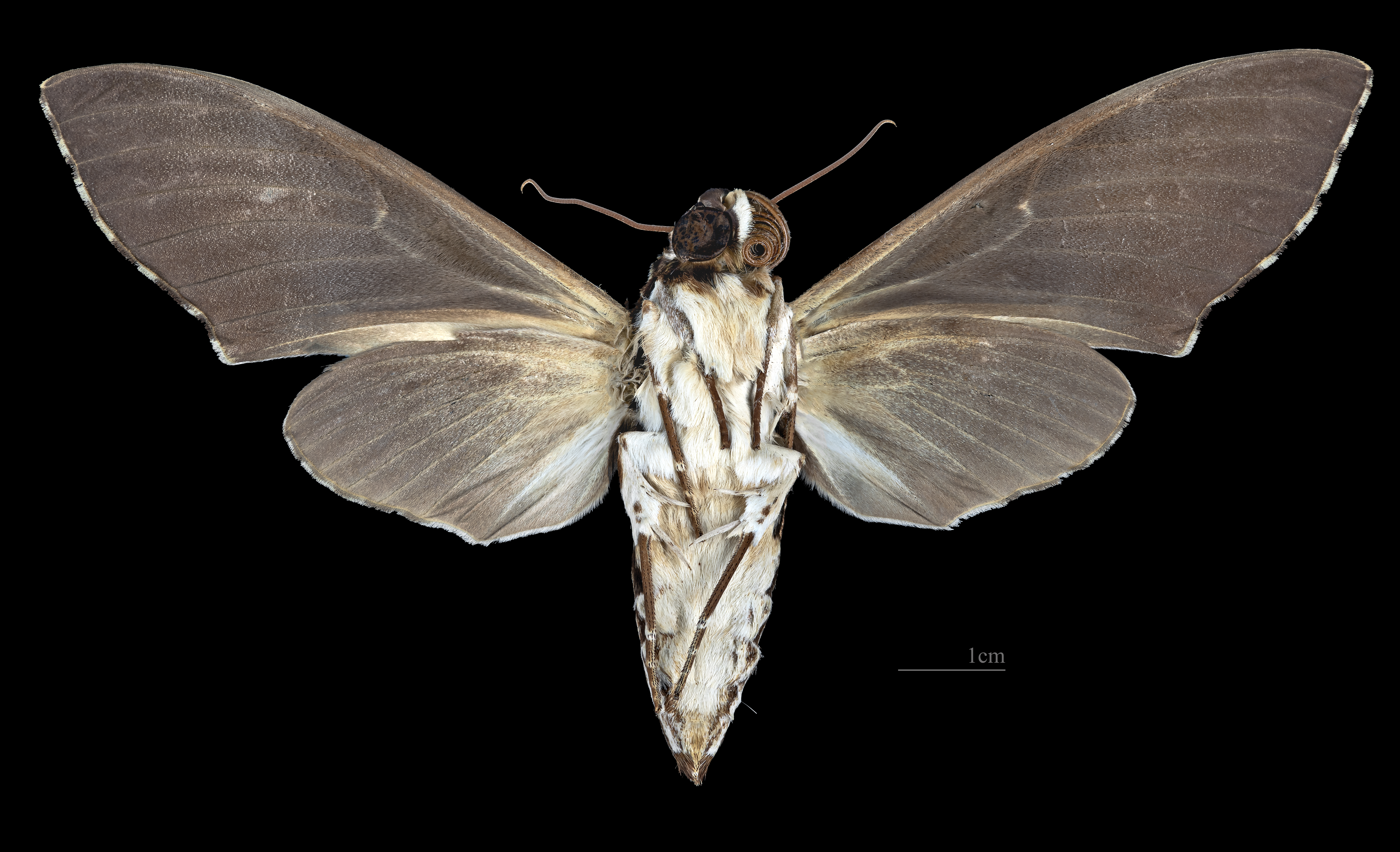
Female ventral
