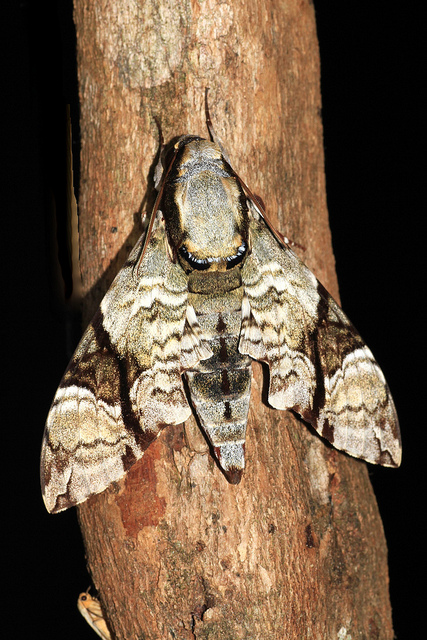
- Megacorma obliqua

Scientific classification
- Domain: Eukaryota
- Kingdom: Animalia
- Phylum: Arthropoda
- Class: Insecta
- Order: Lepidoptera
- Family: Sphingidae
- Tribe: Acherontiini
- Genus: Megacorma; Rothschild & Jordan, 1903

= Megacorma =

Genus of moths

Megacorma is a genus of moths in the family Sphingidae. The genus was erected by Walter Rothschild and Karl Jordan in 1903.

== Species ==
- Megacorma hoffmani Eitschberger, 2007
- Megacorma iorioi Eitschberger, 2003
- Megacorma obliqua (Walker, 1856)
- Megacorma remota Jordan, 1924
- Megacorma schroederi Eitschberger, 1999
