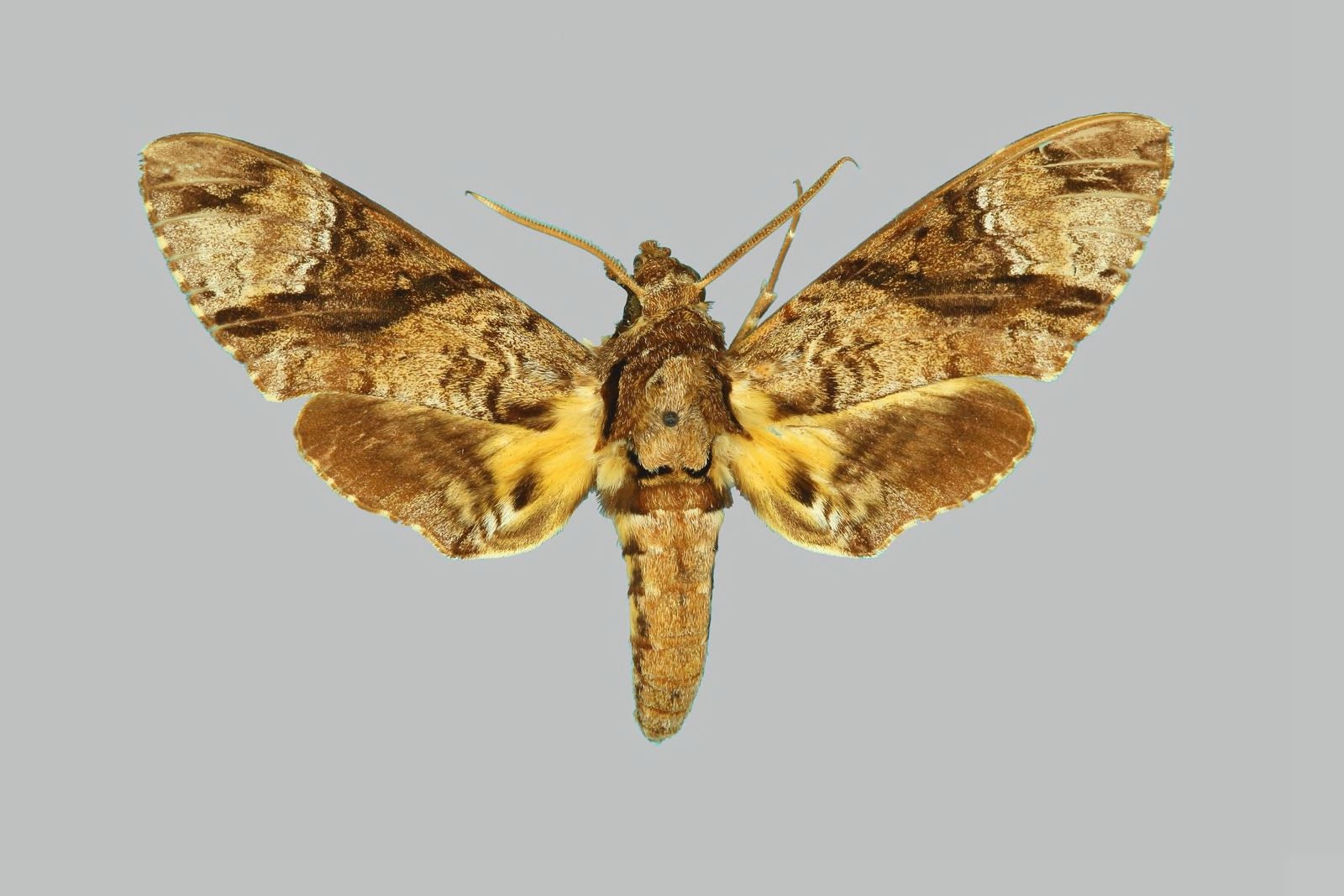
- Male

Scientific classification
- Kingdom: Animalia
- Phylum: Arthropoda
- Clade: Pancrustacea
- Class: Insecta
- Order: Lepidoptera
- Family: Sphingidae
- Genus: Coelonia
- Species: C. brevis

Binomial name
- Coelonia brevis Rothschild & Jordan, 1915

= Coelonia brevis =

Species of moth

Coelonia brevis is a moth of the family Sphingidae. It is known from Madagascar. It is a pollinator of some species of baobab in Madagascar, including Adansonia za.

The length of the forewings is about 39 mm for males.
