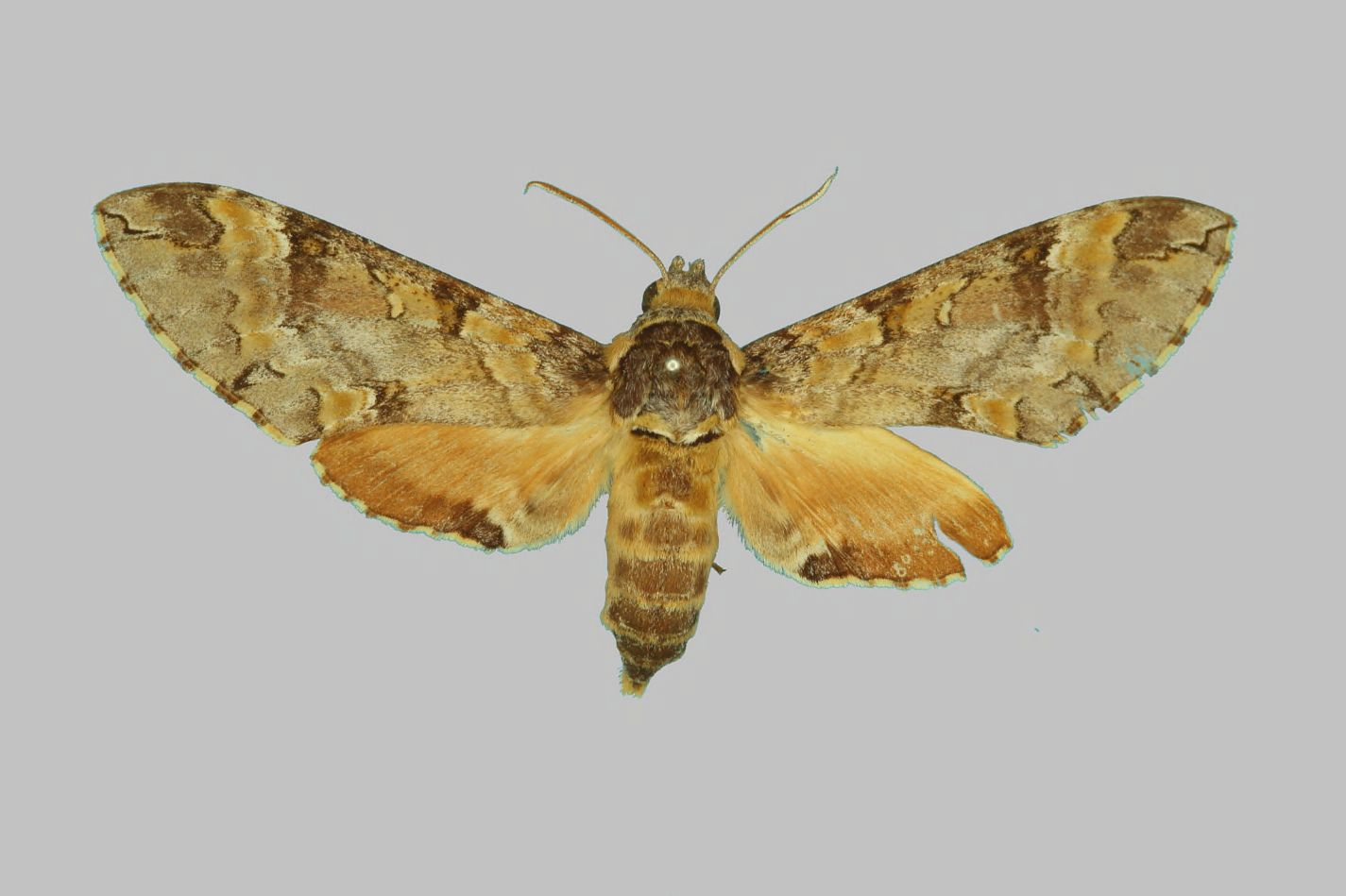
- Female, upperside. From Arusha, Tanzania.

Scientific classification
- Domain: Eukaryota
- Kingdom: Animalia
- Phylum: Arthropoda
- Class: Insecta
- Order: Lepidoptera
- Family: Sphingidae
- Tribe: Acherontiini
- Genus: Callosphingia; Rothschild & Jordan, 1916
- Species: C. circe

Binomial name
- Callosphingia circe (Fawcett, 1915)

Synonyms
- Dovania circe Fawcett, 1915

= Callosphingia =

Callosphingia circe

Genus of moths

Callosphingia is a genus of moths in the family Sphingidae, containing one species, Callosphingia circe, which is known from semi-desert and arid scrub throughout eastern Africa.
