= Megacorma iorioi =

Scientific classification
- Kingdom: Animalia
- Phylum: Arthropoda
- Class: Insecta
- Order: Lepidoptera
- Family: Sphingidae
- Genus: Megacorma
- Species: M. iorioi

Binomial name
- Megacorma iorioi Eitschberger, 2003

Species of moth

Megacorma iorioi is a moth of the family Sphingidae. It is known from Seram in Indonesia.
