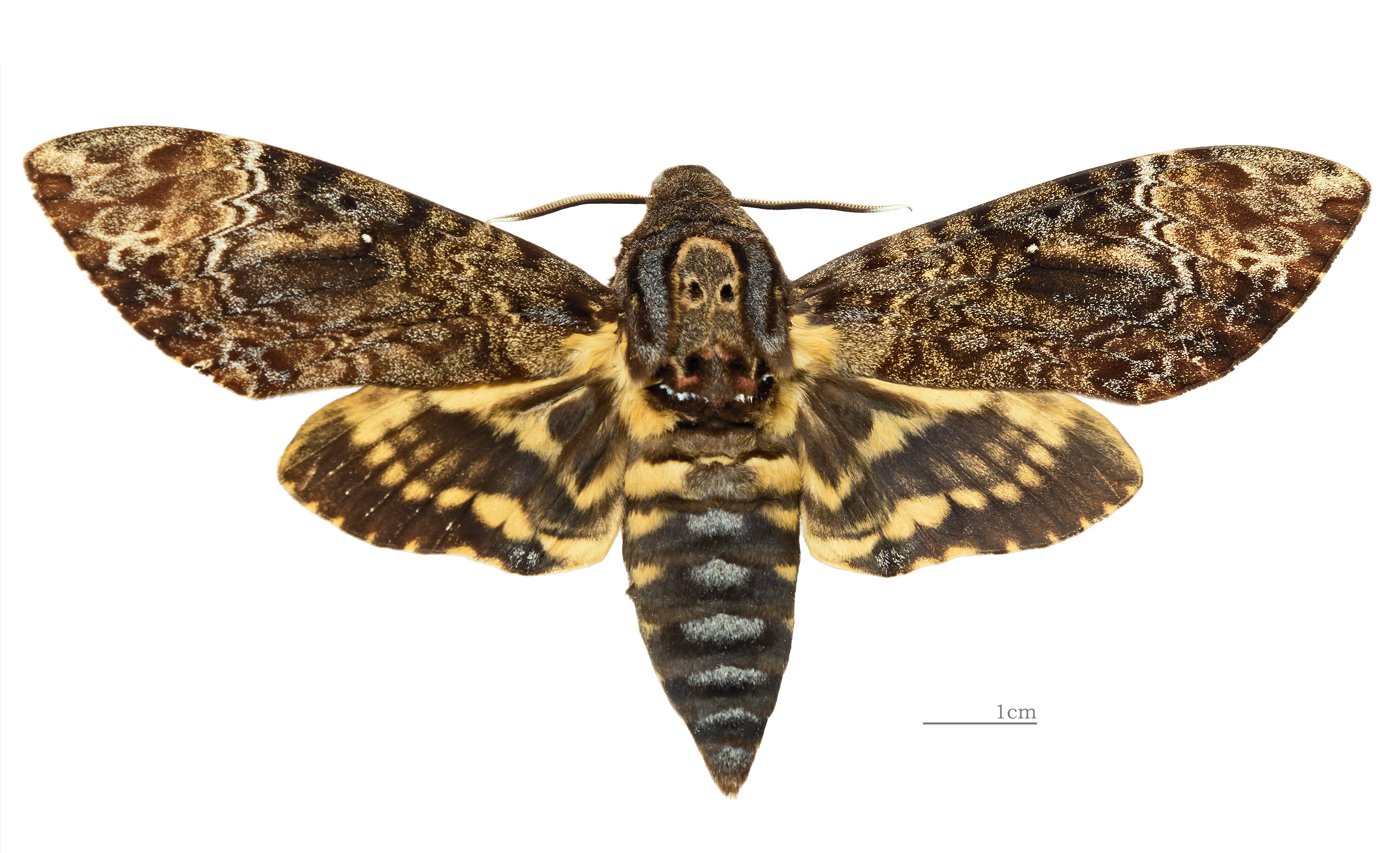
- The greater death's head hawkmoth (Acherontia lachesis)

Scientific classification
- Kingdom: Animalia
- Phylum: Arthropoda
- Class: Insecta
- Order: Lepidoptera
- Family: Sphingidae
- Subfamily: Sphinginae; Latreille, 1802

Type species
- Sphinx ligustri Linnaeus, 1758

Tribes
- Acherontiini; Sphingini; and see text

Diversity
- About 40 genera, over 200 species

Synonyms
- Manducinae Tutt, 1902; Semapnohorae Rothschild & Jordan

= Sphinginae =

Subfamily of moths

The Sphinginae are a subfamily of the hawkmoths (Sphingidae), moths of the order Lepidoptera. The subfamily was first described by Pierre André Latreille in 1802. Notable taxa include the pink-spotted hawkmoth (Agrius cingulata), being a very common and recognizable species, the death's-head hawkmoths (Acherontia species) of Silence of the Lambs fame, and Xanthopan morganii with its enormous proboscis.

== Systematics ==
- Tribe Acherontiini
- Tribe Sphingini
