= Megacorma hoffmani =

Scientific classification
- Kingdom: Animalia
- Phylum: Arthropoda
- Class: Insecta
- Order: Lepidoptera
- Family: Sphingidae
- Genus: Megacorma
- Species: M. hoffmani

Binomial name
- Megacorma hoffmani Eitschberger, 2007

Species of moth

Megacorma hoffmani is a moth of the family Sphingidae. It is known from Papua New Guinea.
