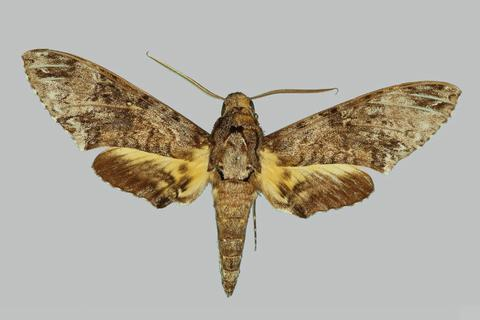
- Coelonia solani male

Scientific classification
- Kingdom: Animalia
- Phylum: Arthropoda
- Clade: Pancrustacea
- Class: Insecta
- Order: Lepidoptera
- Family: Sphingidae
- Genus: Coelonia
- Species: C. solani

Binomial name
- Coelonia solani (Boisduval, 1833)

Synonyms
- Sphinx solani Boisduval, 1833; Sphinx astaroth Boisduval, 1875; Coelonia solani grisescens Saalmüller, 1884

= Coelonia solani =

Species of moth

Coelonia solani is a moth of the family Sphingidae. It is known from Mauritius, Réunion (formerly known as Île Bourbon), Madagascar and the Comoro Islands. It is a pollinator of some species of baobab in Madagascar, including Adansonia za.

It is notable for having an extremely long proboscis (up to 19 cm long), approaching that of another more famous Malagasy sphinx moth, ie, Xanthopan morganii praedicta, which has a proboscis length of over 20 cm

== Subspecies ==
- Coelonia solani solani (Mauritius, Réunion, Madagascar)
- Coelonia solani comoroana Clark, 1927 (Comoros)
