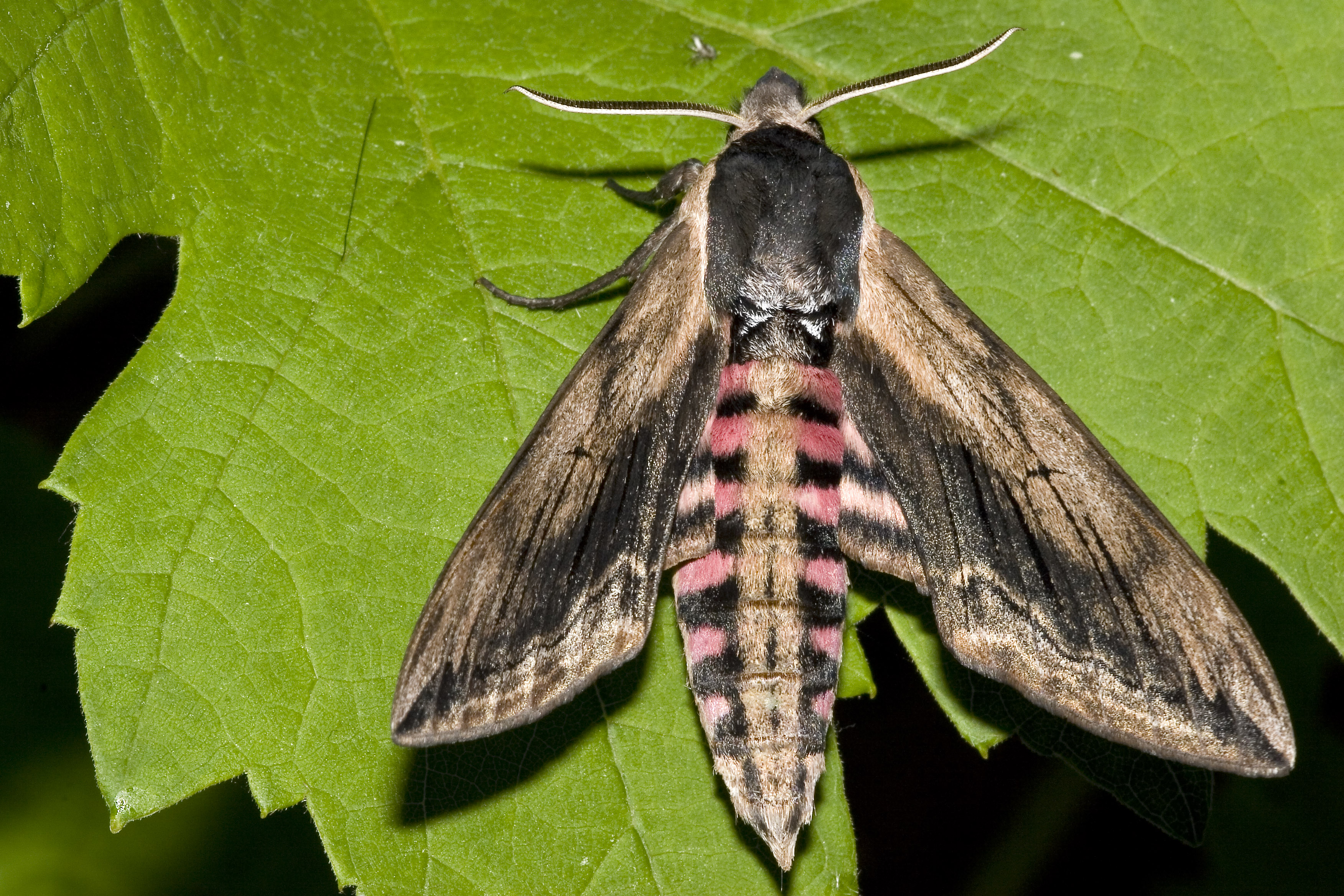

Scientific classification
- Kingdom: Animalia
- Phylum: Arthropoda
- Class: Insecta
- Order: Lepidoptera
- Family: Sphingidae
- Genus: Sphinx
- Species: S. ligustri

Binomial name
- Sphinx ligustri Linnaeus, 1758

Synonyms
- Sphinx chishimensis Matsumura, 1929; Sphinx spiraeae Esper, 1800; Sphinx ligustri albescens Tutt, 1904; Sphinx ligustri amurensis Oberthür, 1886; Sphinx ligustri brunnea Tutt, 1904; Sphinx ligustri brunnescens (Lempke, 1959); Sphinx ligustri cingulata (Lempke, 1964); Sphinx ligustri eichleri Eitschberger, Danner & Surholt, 1992; Sphinx ligustri fraxini Dannehl, 1925; Sphinx ligustri grisea (Closs, 1917); Sphinx ligustri incerta Tutt, 1904; Sphinx ligustri intermedia Tutt, 1904; Sphinx ligustri lutescens Tutt, 1904; Sphinx ligustri nisseni Rothschild & Jordan, 1916; Sphinx ligustri obscura Tutt, 1904; Sphinx ligustri pallida Tutt, 1904; Sphinx ligustri perversa Gehlen, 1928; Sphinx ligustri postrufescens (Lempke, 1959); Sphinx ligustri rosacea Rebel, 1910; Sphinx ligustri seydeli Debauche, 1934; Sphinx ligustri subpallida Tutt, 1904; Sphinx ligustri typica Tutt, 1904; Sphinx ligustri unifasciata Gschwandner, 1912; Sphinx ligustri weryi Rungs, 1977; Sphinx ligustri zolotuhini Eitschberger & Lukhtanov, 1996

= Sphinx ligustri =

Privet hawk moth

Species of moth

Sphinx ligustri, the privet hawk moth, is a moth found in most of the Palearctic realm. The species was first described by Carl Linnaeus in his 1758 10th edition of Systema Naturae.

== Description ==
It has a 12 centimetres (4.7 in) wingspan (generally deflexed at rest), and is found in urban areas, forests and woodlands.

The male privet hawk moth can make a hissing sound, if disturbed, by rubbing together a set of scales and spines at the end of its abdomen.

The larvae are usually found between July and August: and bury themselves in the earth when preparing to become a pupa. They then fly in the following June.

== Diet ==
As both its common name and specific name - ligustri being derived from the Latin ligustrum, 'privet' - describes, the caterpillars feed on privets, as well as ash trees, lilacs, jasmine, and a number of other plants.

== Gallery ==
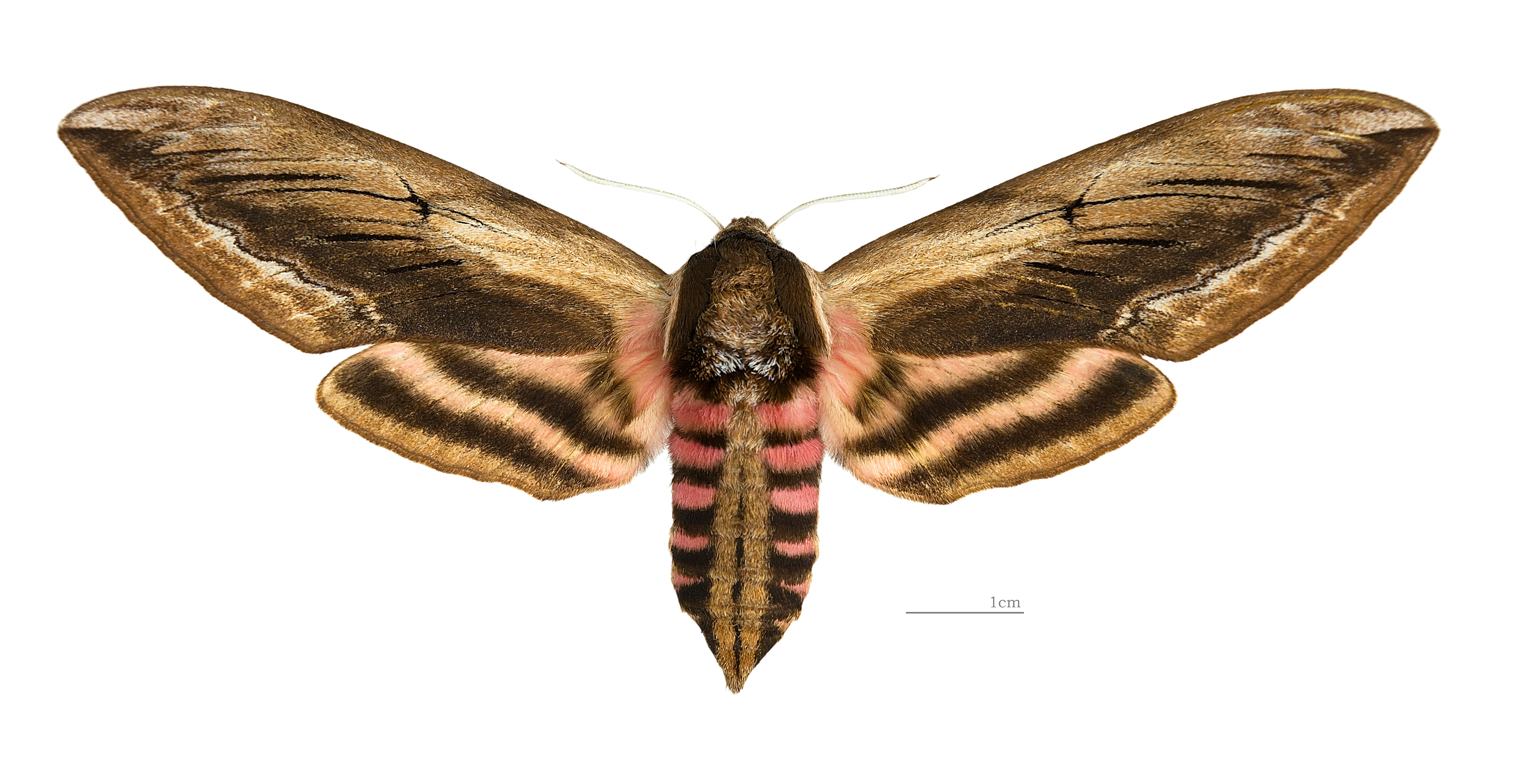
Female, dorsal side

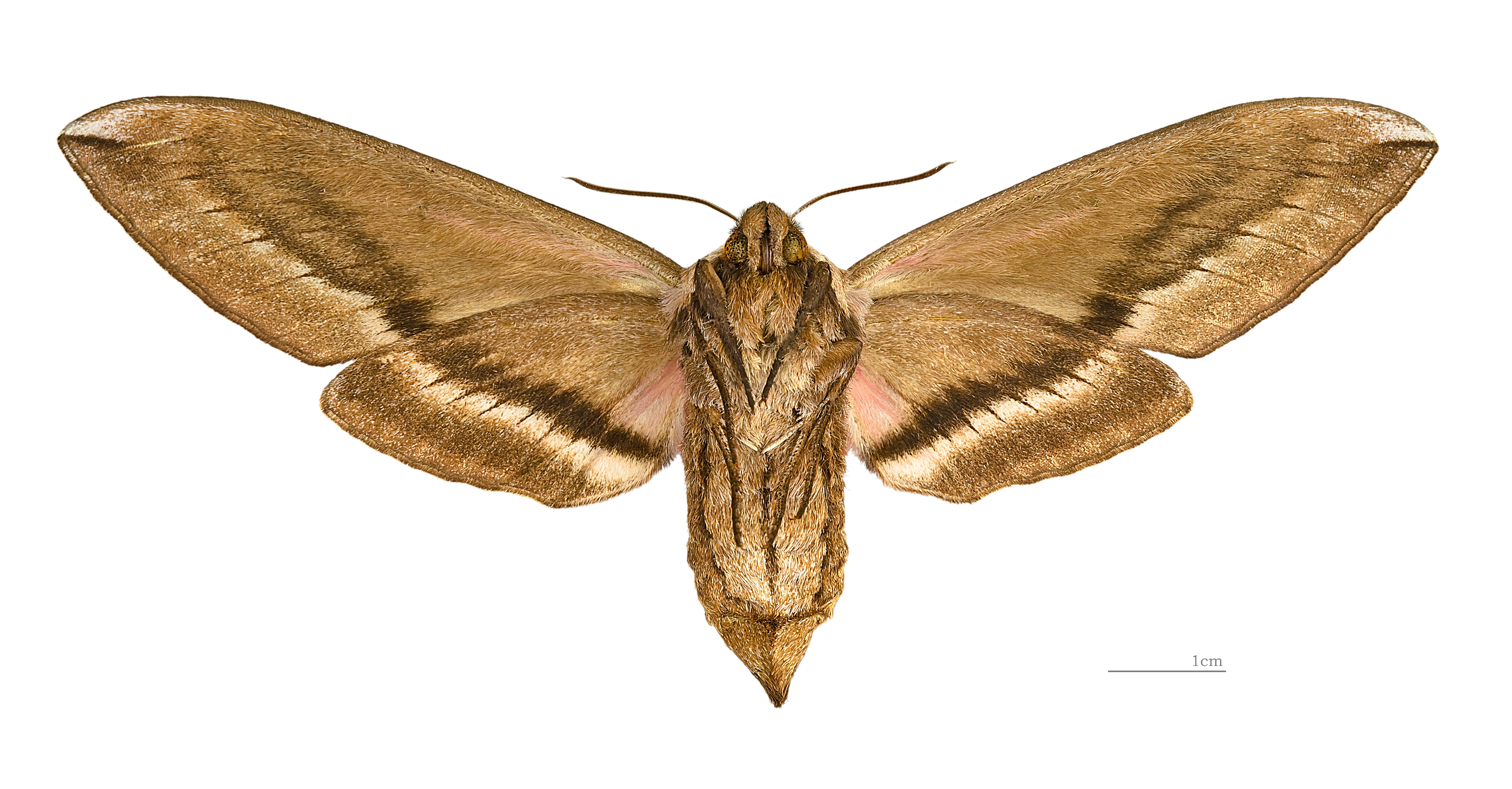
Female, ventral side

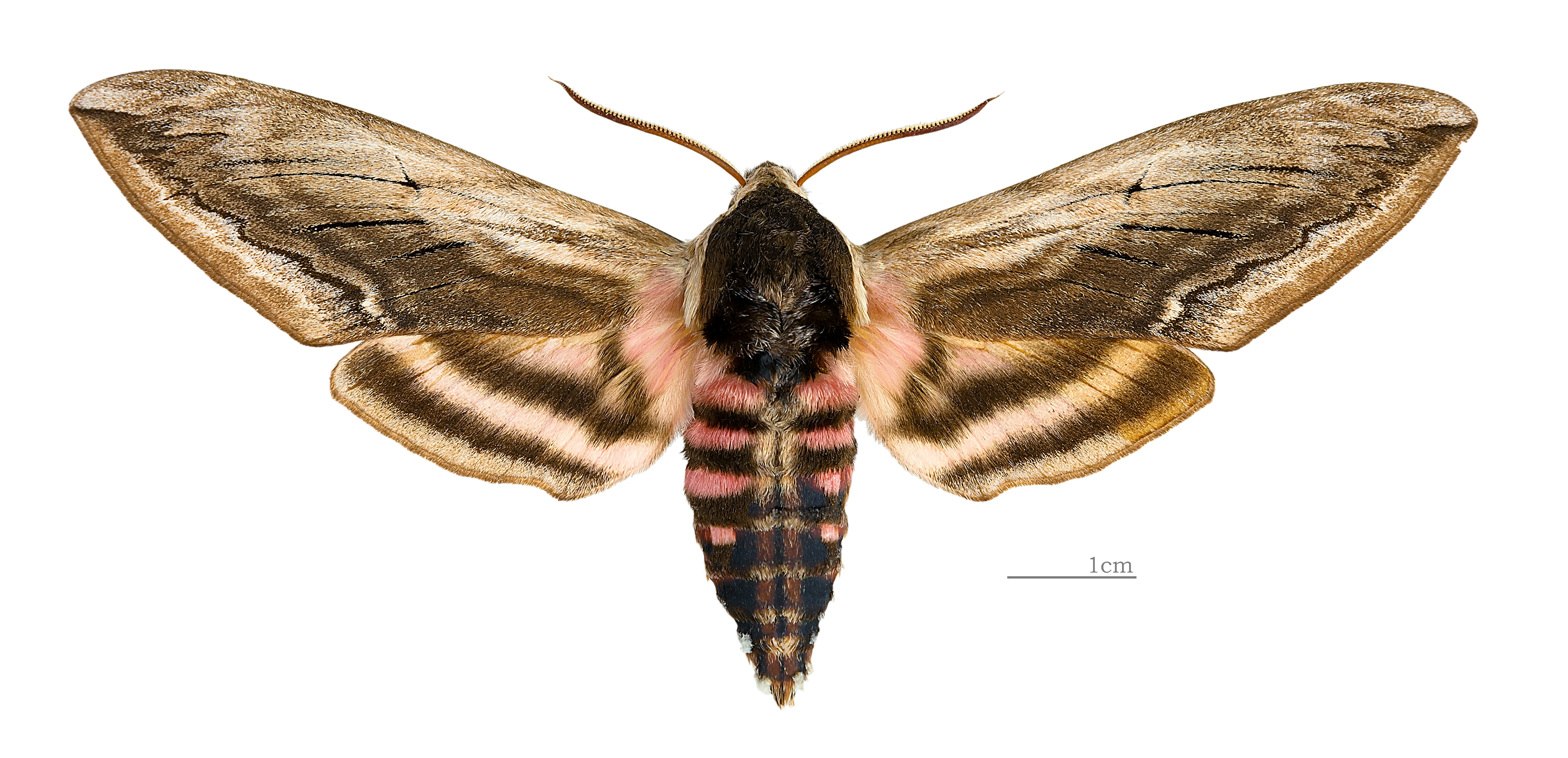
Male, dorsal side

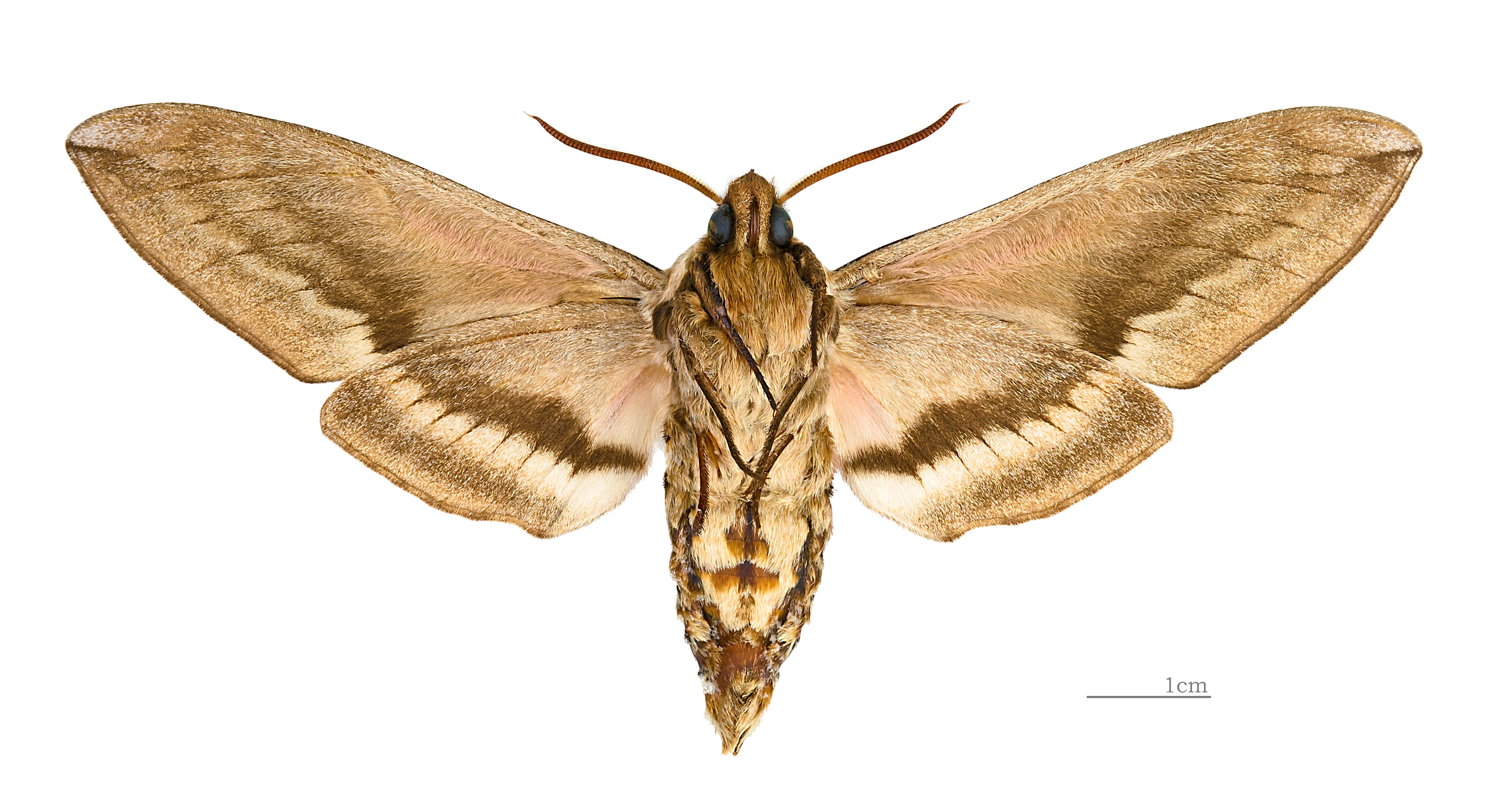
Male, ventral side
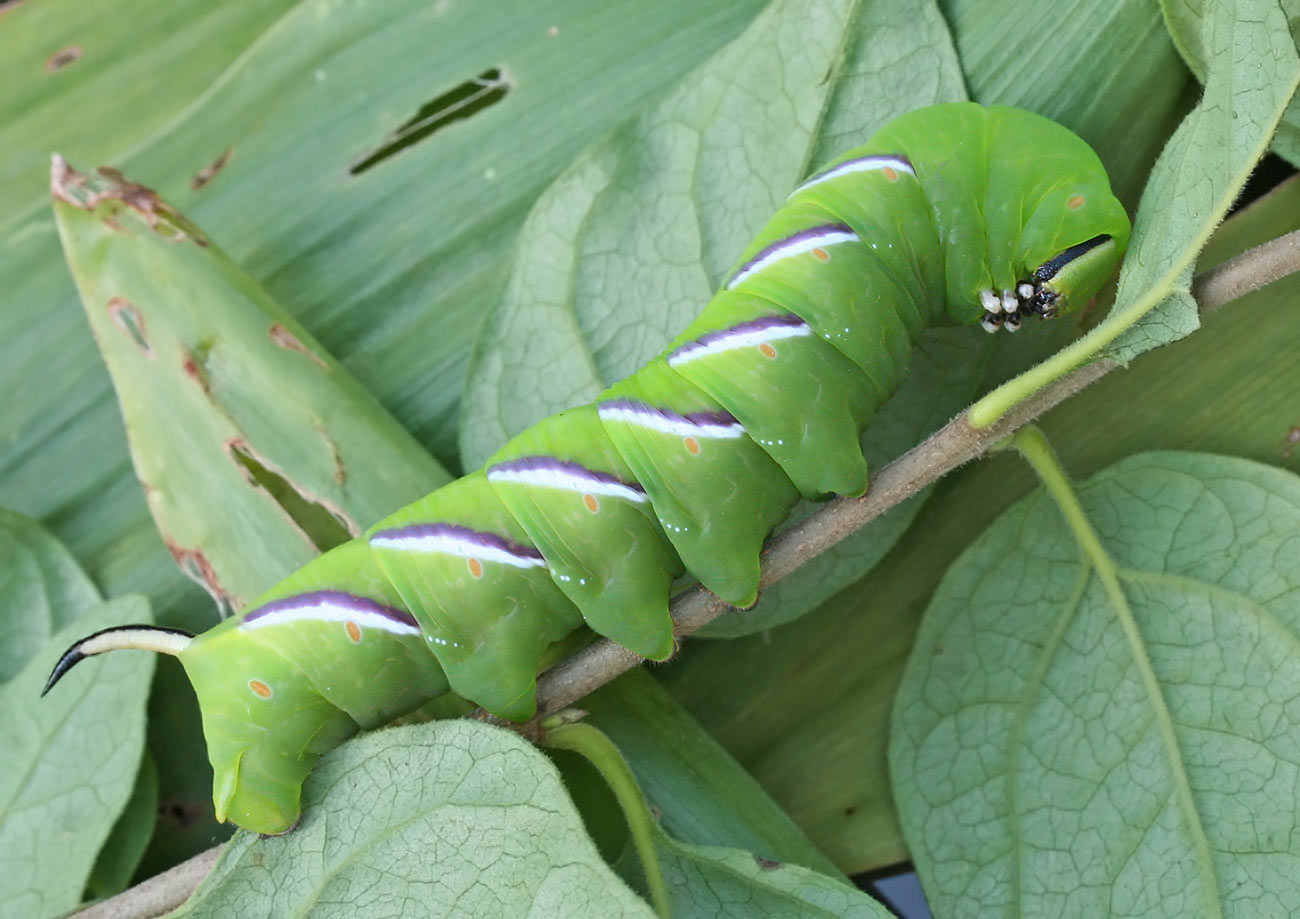
Caterpillar

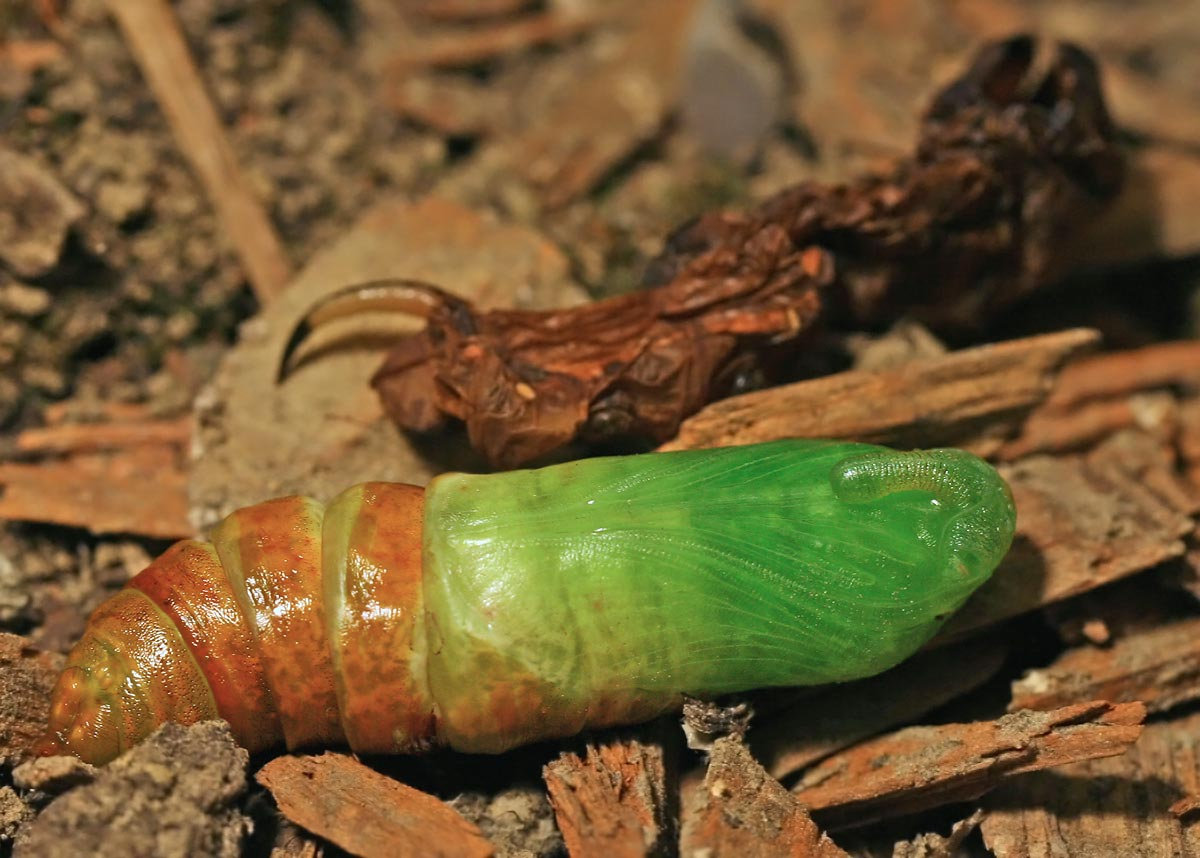
Pupating

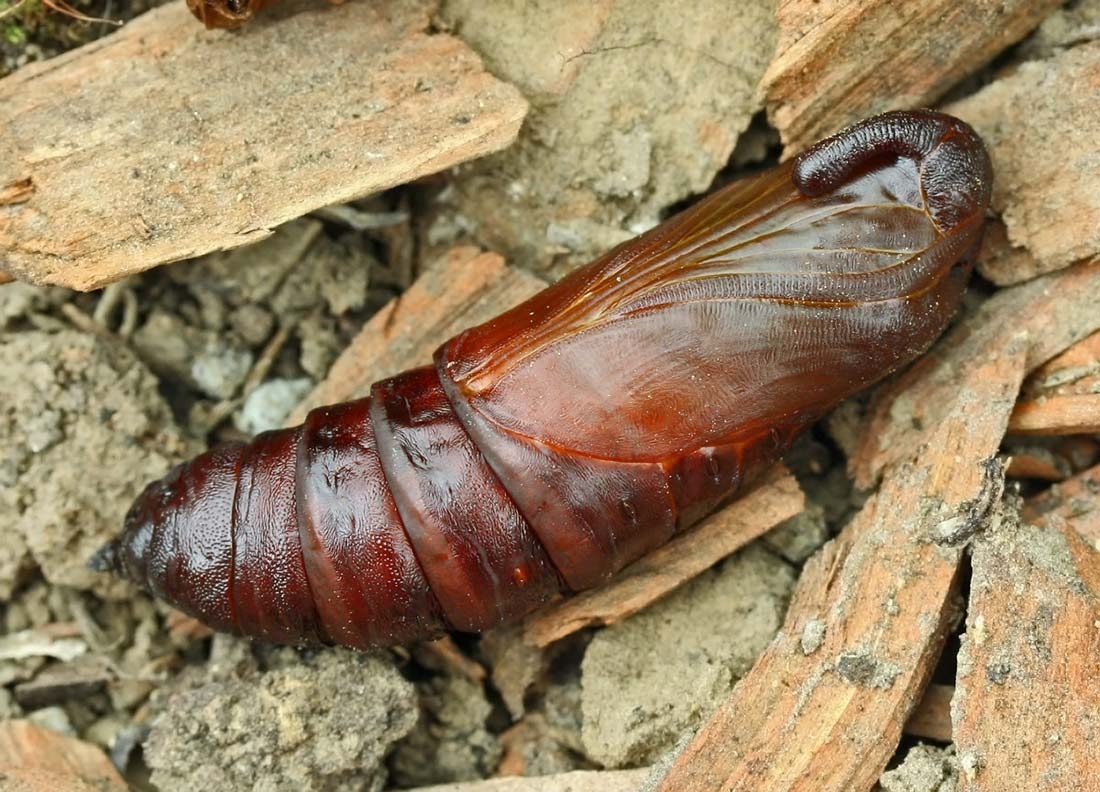
Pupa

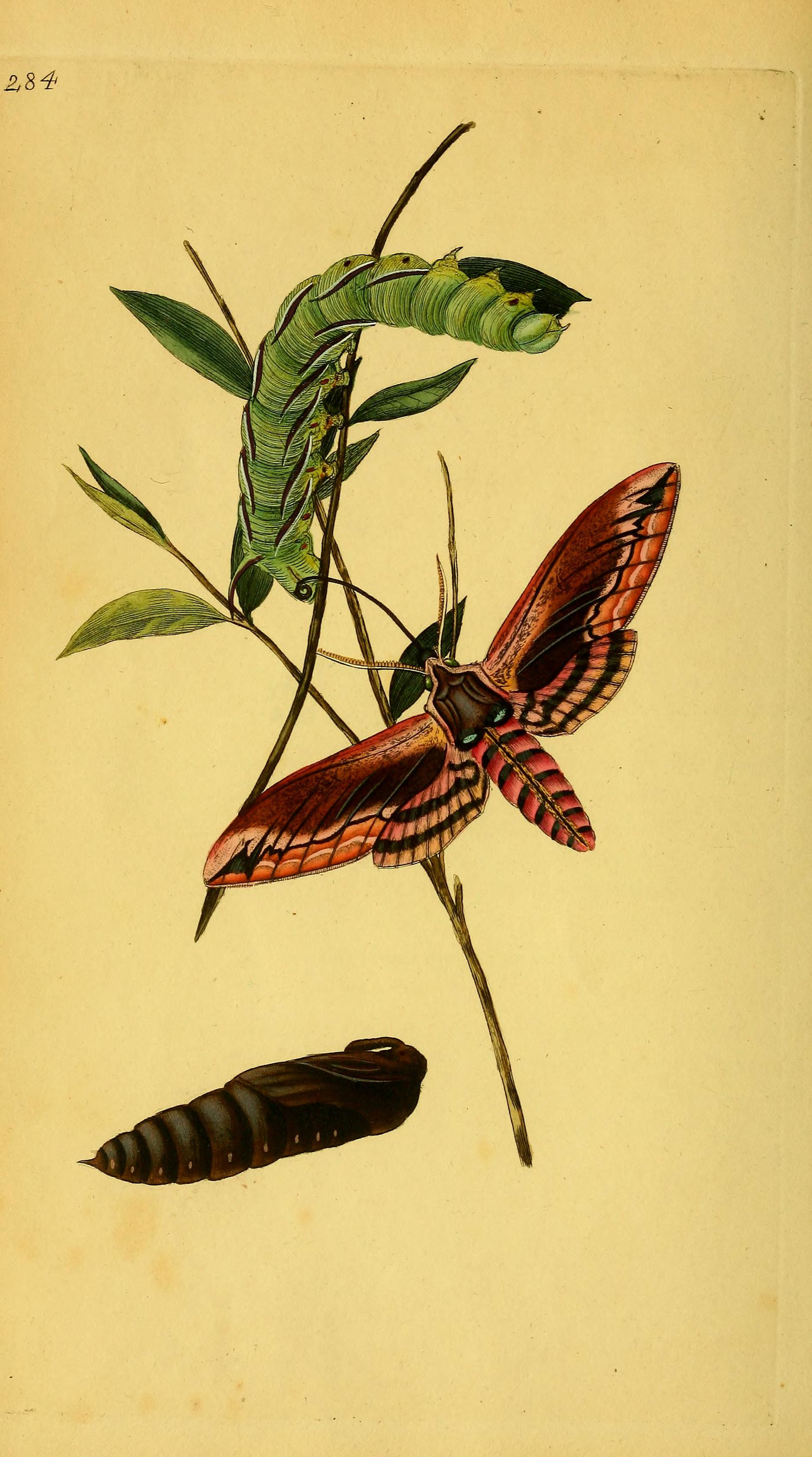
Pupa, caterpillar, and adult
