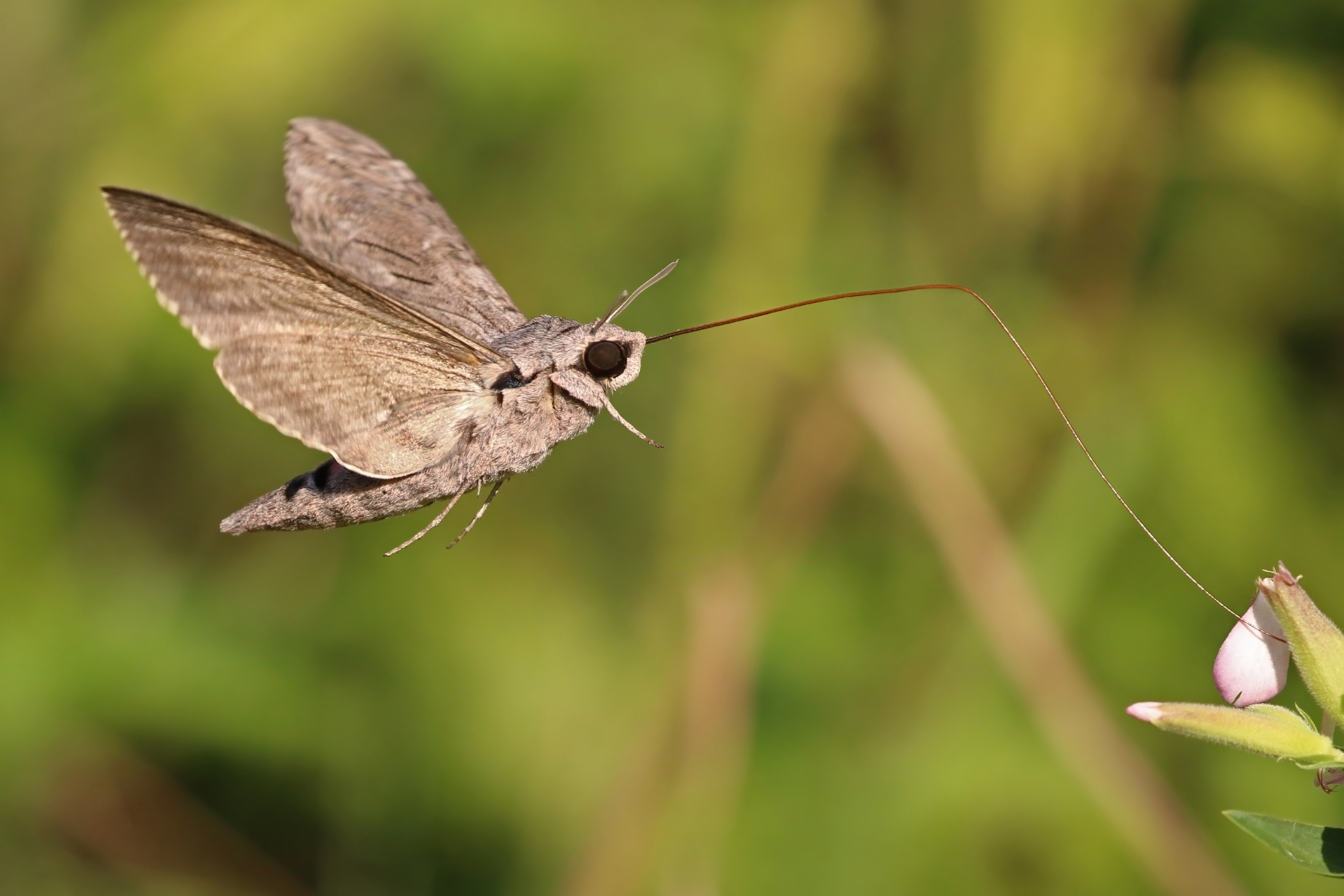
- Convolvulus hawk-moth, Agrius convolvuli

Scientific classification
- Kingdom: Animalia
- Phylum: Arthropoda
- Clade: Pancrustacea
- Class: Insecta
- Order: Lepidoptera
- Superfamily: Bombycoidea
- Family: Sphingidae; Latreille, 1802

Type species
- Sphinx ligustri Linnaeus, 1758

Subfamilies
- Macroglossinae; Smerinthinae; Sphinginae

Diversity
- About 200 genera, roughly 1,450 species

= Sphingidae =

Hawk moths Temporal range: Miocene–Recent

Family of insects

The Sphingidae are a family of moths commonly called sphinx moths, also colloquially known as hawk moths; many of their caterpillars are known as hornworms. The family includes about 1,450 species. It is best represented in the tropics, but species are found in every region. They are moderate to large in size and are distinguished among moths for their agile and sustained flying ability, similar enough to that of hummingbirds as to be reliably mistaken for them. Their narrow wings and streamlined abdomens are adaptations for rapid flight. The family was named by French zoologist Pierre André Latreille in 1802.

Some hawk moths, such as the hummingbird hawk-moth and the white-lined sphinx, hover in midair while they feed on nectar from flowers, so are sometimes mistaken for hummingbirds. This hovering capability is only known to have evolved four times in nectar feeders: in hummingbirds, certain bats, hoverflies, and these sphingids (an example of convergent evolution). Sphingids have been studied for their flying ability, especially their ability to move rapidly from side to side while hovering, called "swing-hovering" or "side-slipping". This is thought to have evolved to deal with ambush predators that lie in wait in flowers.

Sphingids are some of the faster flying insects; some are capable of flying at over 5.3 m/s (19 km/h; 12 mph). They have wingspans from 4 to 10 cm (1 1/2 to 4 in) or more.

== Description ==
Sphingids' antennae are not very feathery, even in males, and some species even have clubbed antennae similar to butterflies. They lack tympanal organs, but members of the group Choerocampini have hearing organs on their heads. They have a frenulum and retinaculum to join hindwings and forewings. The thorax, abdomen, and wings are densely covered in scales. Some sphingids have a rudimentary proboscis, but most have a very long one, which is used to feed on nectar from flowers. The proboscis length of a hawk moth can vary from 1cm up to 28 cm. Hawk moths have some of the longest proboscides of all insects, allowing them to reach nectar from flowers with long corolla tubes that other pollinators do not have access to. Most are crepuscular or nocturnal, but some species fly during the day. Both males and females are relatively long-lived (10 to 30 days). Prior to flight, most species shiver their flight muscles to warm them up, and, during flight, body temperatures may surpass 40 °C (104 °F).

In some species, differences in form between the sexes is quite marked. For example, in the African species Agrius convolvuli (the convolvulus or morning glory hawk-moth), males have thicker antennae and more mottled wing markings than females. Only males have both an undivided frenular hook and a retinaculum. Only males have a partial comb of hairs along with their antennae. Females attract males with pheromones. The male may douse the female with a pheromone before mating.

=== Behavior ===
Some species fly only for short periods either around dusk or dawn, while other species only appear later in the evening and others around midnight, but such species may occasionally be seen feeding on flowers during the day. A few common species in Africa, such as the Oriental beehawk (Cephonodes hylas virescens), Macroglossum hirundo, and Macroglossum trochilus, are diurnal.

A number of species are known to be migratory, all in the Sphingini and Macroglossinae, and specially in the genera Agrius, Cephonodes, Macroglossum, Hippotion and Theretra.

=== Flight ===
In studies with Manduca sexta, moths have dynamic flight sensory capabilities due to their antennae. The antennae are vibrated in a plane so that when the body of the moth rotates during controlled aerial maneuvers, the antennae are subject to the inertial Coriolis forces that are linearly proportional to the angular velocity of the body. The Coriolis forces cause deflections of the antennae, which are detected by the Johnston's organ at the base of each antenna, with strong frequency responses at the beat frequency of the antennae (around 25 Hz) and at twice the beat frequency. The relative magnitude of the two frequency responses enables the moth to distinguish rotation around the different principal axes, allowing for rapid course control during aerial maneuvers.

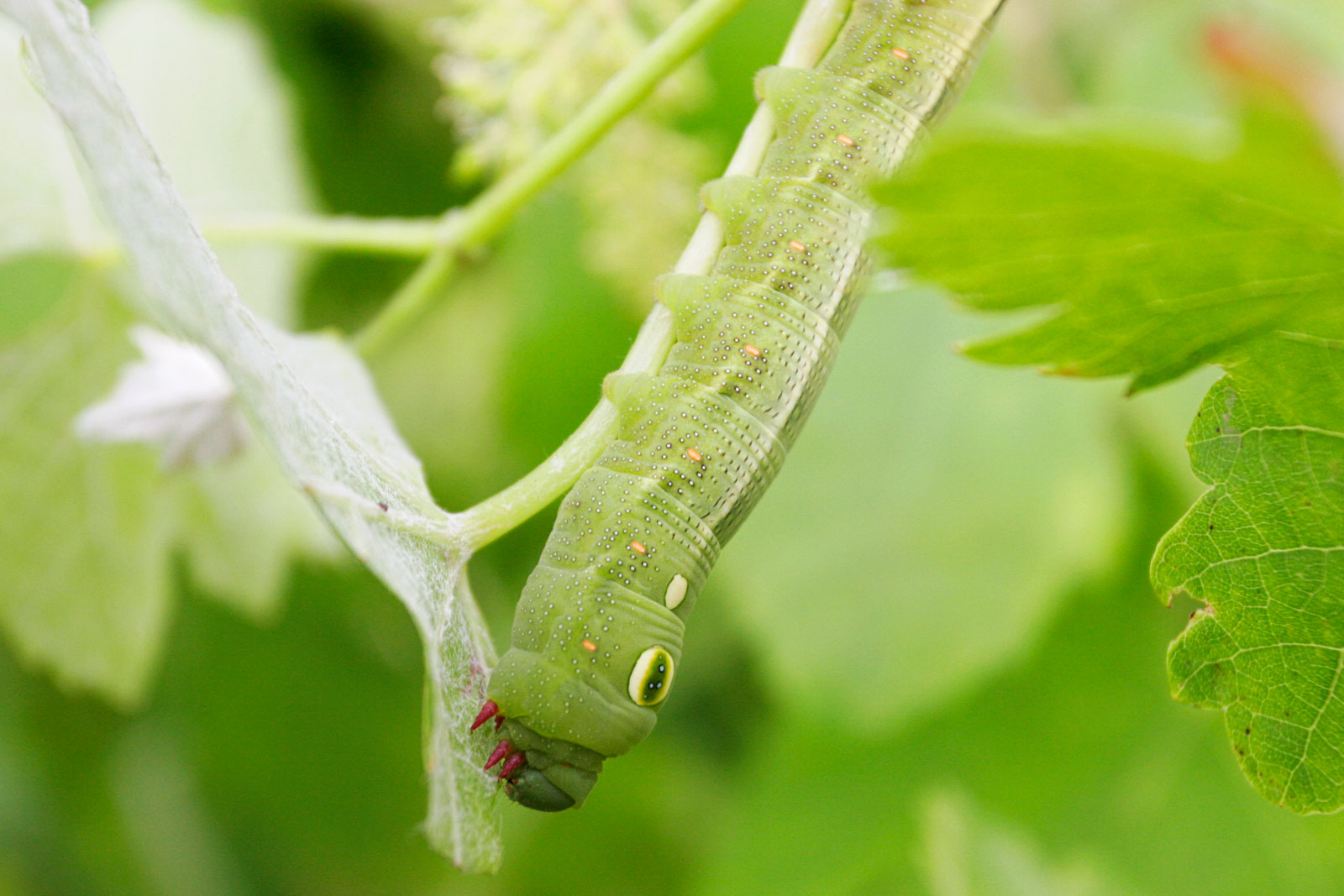
Vine hawk-moth larva (Hippotion celerio)

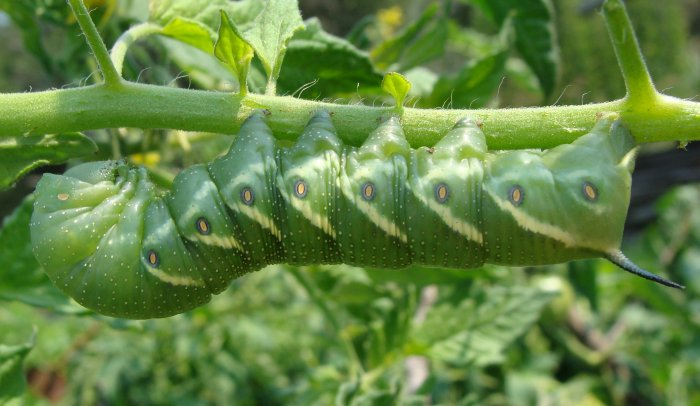
An example of the posterior "horn" seen on the tomato hornworm

== Life cycle ==
Most species are multivoltine, capable of producing several generations a year if weather conditions permit. Females lay translucent, greenish, flattened, smooth eggs, usually singly on the host plants. Egg development time varies highly, from three to 21 days.

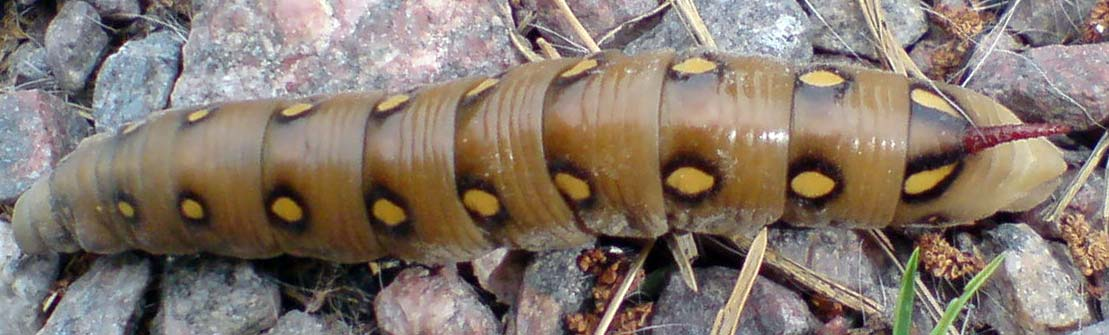
A Hyles gallii caterpillar seeking a place to pupate: the color of the caterpillar darkens before pupation.

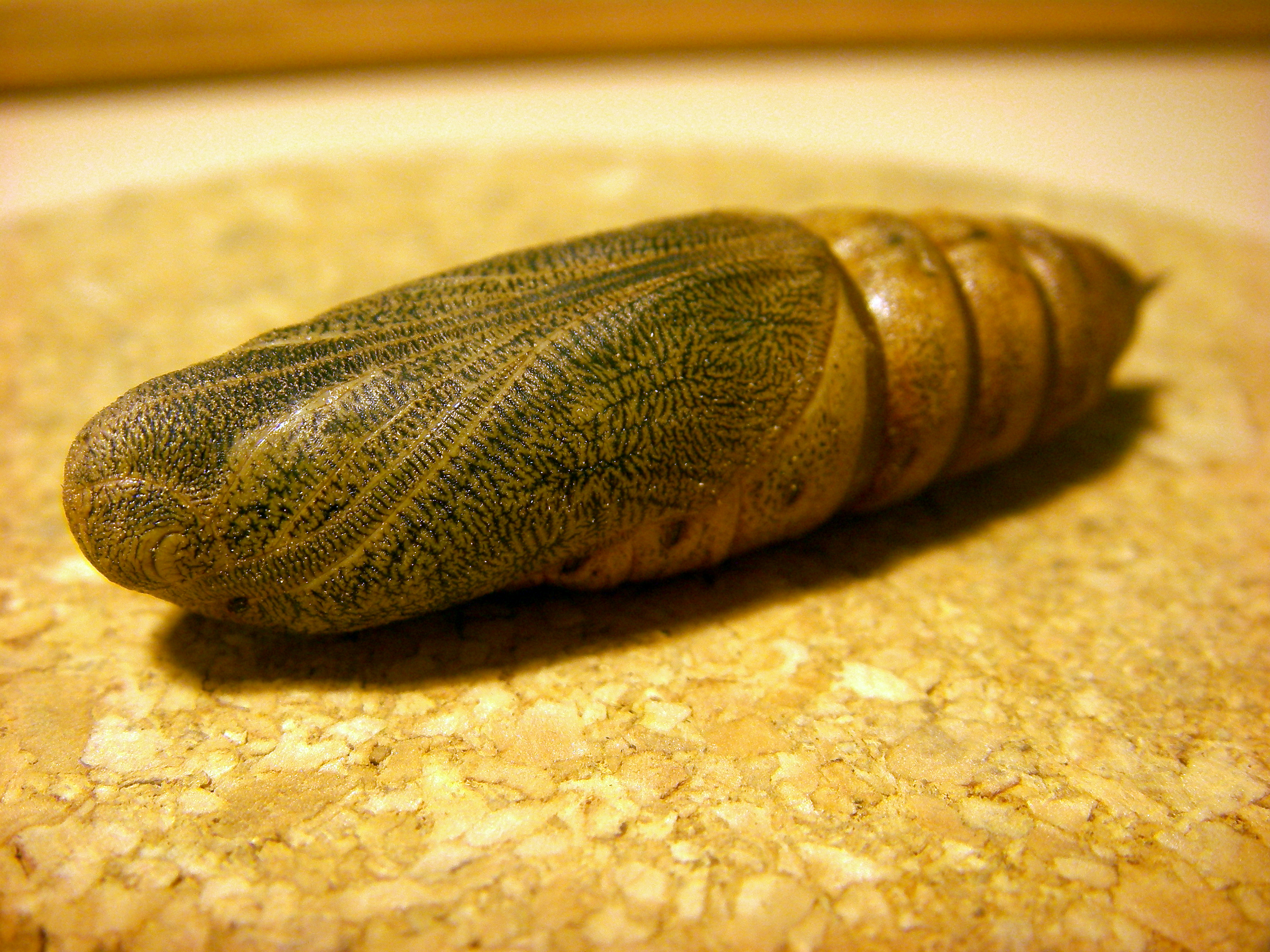
Hyles euphorbiae pupa

Sphingid caterpillars are medium to large in size, with stout bodies. They have five pairs of prolegs. Usually, their bodies lack any hairs or tubercules, but most species have a "horn" at the posterior end, which may be reduced to a button, or absent, in the final instar. Many are cryptic greens and browns, and have countershading patterns to conceal them. Others are more conspicuously colored, typically with white spots on a black or yellow background along the length of the body. A pattern of diagonal slashes along the side is a common feature. When resting, the caterpillar usually holds its legs off the surface and tucks its head underneath (praying position), which, resembling the Great Sphinx of Giza, gives rise to the name "sphinx moth". Some tropical larvae are thought to mimic snakes. Larvae are quick to regurgitate their sticky, often toxic, foregut contents on attackers such as ants and parasitoids. Development rate depends on temperature, and to speed development, some northern and high-altitude species sunbathe. Larvae burrow into the soil to pupate, where they remain for two to three weeks before they emerge as adults.

In some sphingids, the pupa has a free proboscis, rather than being fused to the pupal case as is most common in the macrolepidoptera. They have a cremaster at the tip of the abdomen. Usually, they pupate off the host plant, in an underground chamber, among rocks, or in a loose cocoon. In most species, the pupa is the overwintering stage.

== Food plants ==
=== Larvae ===
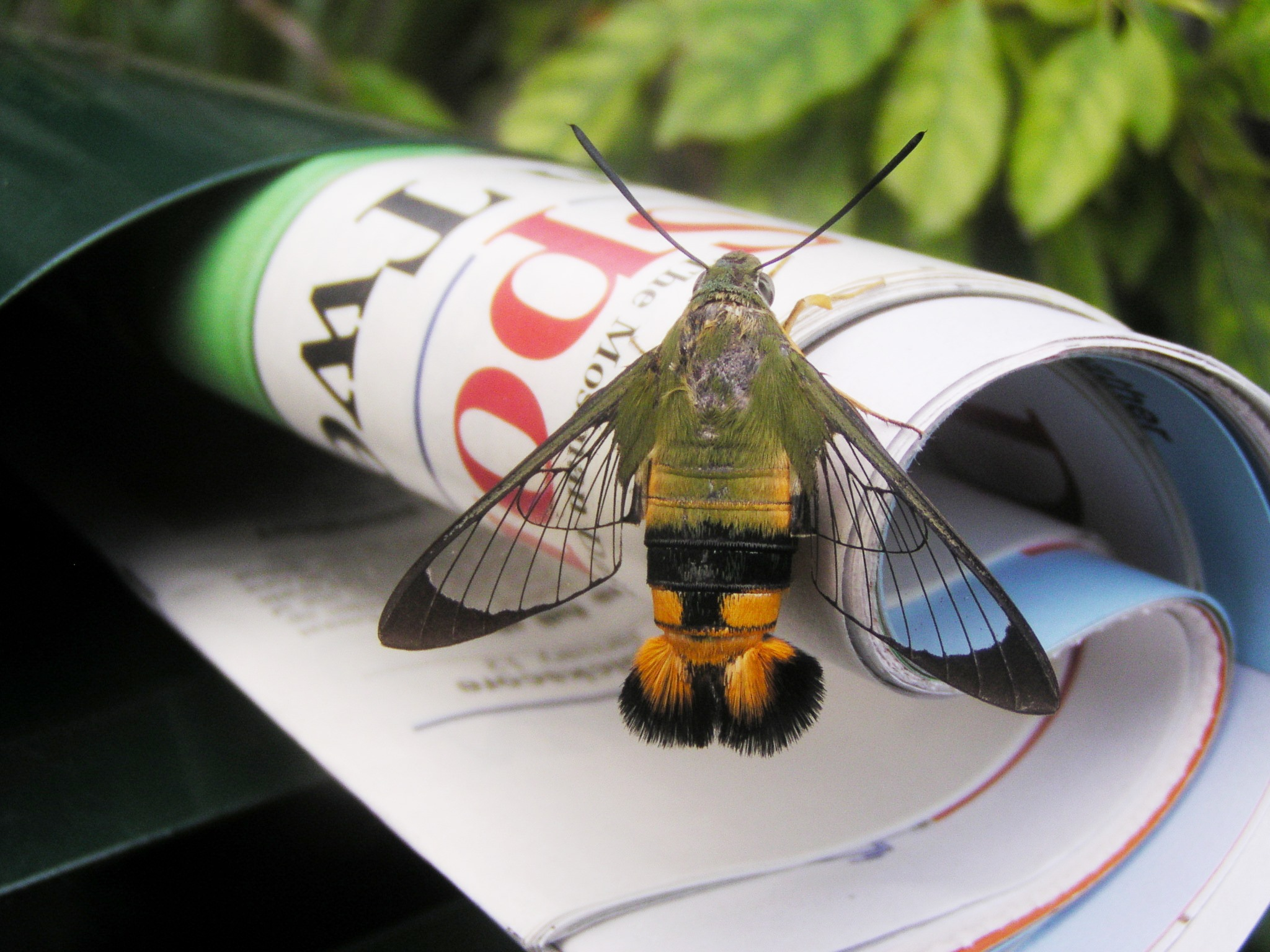
C. kingii, Crows Nest

Sphingid larvae tend to be specific feeders, rather than generalists. Compared to similarly sized saturniids, sphingids eat soft young leaves of host plants with small toxic molecules, and chew and mash the food into very small bits. Some species can tolerate quite high concentrations of specific toxins. Tobacco hornworms (Manduca sexta) detoxify and rapidly excrete nicotine, as do several other related sphinx moths in the subfamilies Sphinginae and Macroglossinae, but members of the Smerinthinae that were tested are susceptible. The species that are able to tolerate the toxin do not sequester it in their tissues; 98% was excreted. However, other species, such as Hyles euphorbiae and Daphnis nerii, do sequester toxins from their hosts, but do not pass them on to the adult stage.

=== Adults ===
Most adults feed on nectar, although a few tropical species feed on eye secretions, and the death's-head hawkmoth steals honey from bees. Night-flying sphingids tend to prefer pale flowers with long corolla tubes and a sweet odor, a pollination syndrome known as "sphingophily". Some species are quite general in visitations, while others are very specific, with the plant only being successfully pollinated by a particular species of moth. Orchids frequently have such specific relations with hawk moths and very long corolla tubes. The comet orchid (Angraecum sesquipedale), a rare Malagasy flower with its nectar stored at the bottom of a 30-centimetre-long (12 in) tube, was described in 1822 by Louis-Marie Aubert du Petit-Thouars, and later, Charles Darwin famously predicted there must be some specialized moth to feed from it:

[A. sesquipetale has] nectaries 11 and a half inches long [29 cm], with only the lower inch and a half [4 cm] filled with very sweet nectar [...] it is, however, surprising, that any insect should be able to reach the nectar: our English sphinxes have probosces as long as their bodies, but in Madagascar, there must be moths with probosces capable of extension to a length of between 10 and 12 inches! [25 and 30 cm]

A recent global study found that specialization is driven primarily by the flower rather than the hawk moth. Researchers observed that the hawk moths visited a variety of flowers with different corolla tube lengths, making them generalists. On the other hand flowers with longer corolla tubes limited the number of hawk moth species that could pollinate and reach their nectar, making them more specialized. Data also showed that flowers with longer corolla tubes produced greater volumes of nectar, likely to compensate for more specialized hawk moths species. The findings of the study demonstrated the importance of the variation in hawk moth proboscis length and how it shapes flower evolution.

Alfred Russel Wallace published a sort of "wanted poster" (properly, a drawing in a book) of what this lepidopteran might look like, and, concurring with his colleague, added:

[The proboscis of a hawk moth] from tropical Africa ([Xanthopan] morganii) is seven inches and a half [19 cm]. A species having a proboscis two or three inches longer [8 cm] could reach the nectar in the largest flowers of Angraecum sesquipedale, whose nectaries vary in length from ten to fourteen inches [36 cm]. That such a moth exists in Madagascar may be safely predicted, and naturalists who visit that island should search for it with as much confidence as astronomers searched for the planet Neptune, – and they will be equally successful.

The predicted sphingid was discovered 21 years later and described as a subspecies of the one African species studied by Wallace: Xanthopan morganii praedicta, for which, the subspecific name praedicta ("the predicted one") was given. The Madagascan individuals had a pink, rather than white, breast and abdomen and a black apical line on the forewing, broader than in mainland specimens. Molecular clock models using either rate- or fossil-based calibrations imply that the Madagascan subspecies X. m. praedicta and the African subspecies X. m. morgani diverged 7.4 ± 2.8 Mya (million years ago), which overlaps the divergence of A. sesquipedale from its sister, A. sororium, namely 7.5 ± 5.2 Mya. Since both these orchids have extremely long spurs, longspurs likely existed before that and were exploited by long-tongued moths similar to Xanthopan morganii praedicta. The long geological separation of subspecies morgani and praedicta matches their morphological differences in the color of the breast and abdomen.

== Relationships and species ==
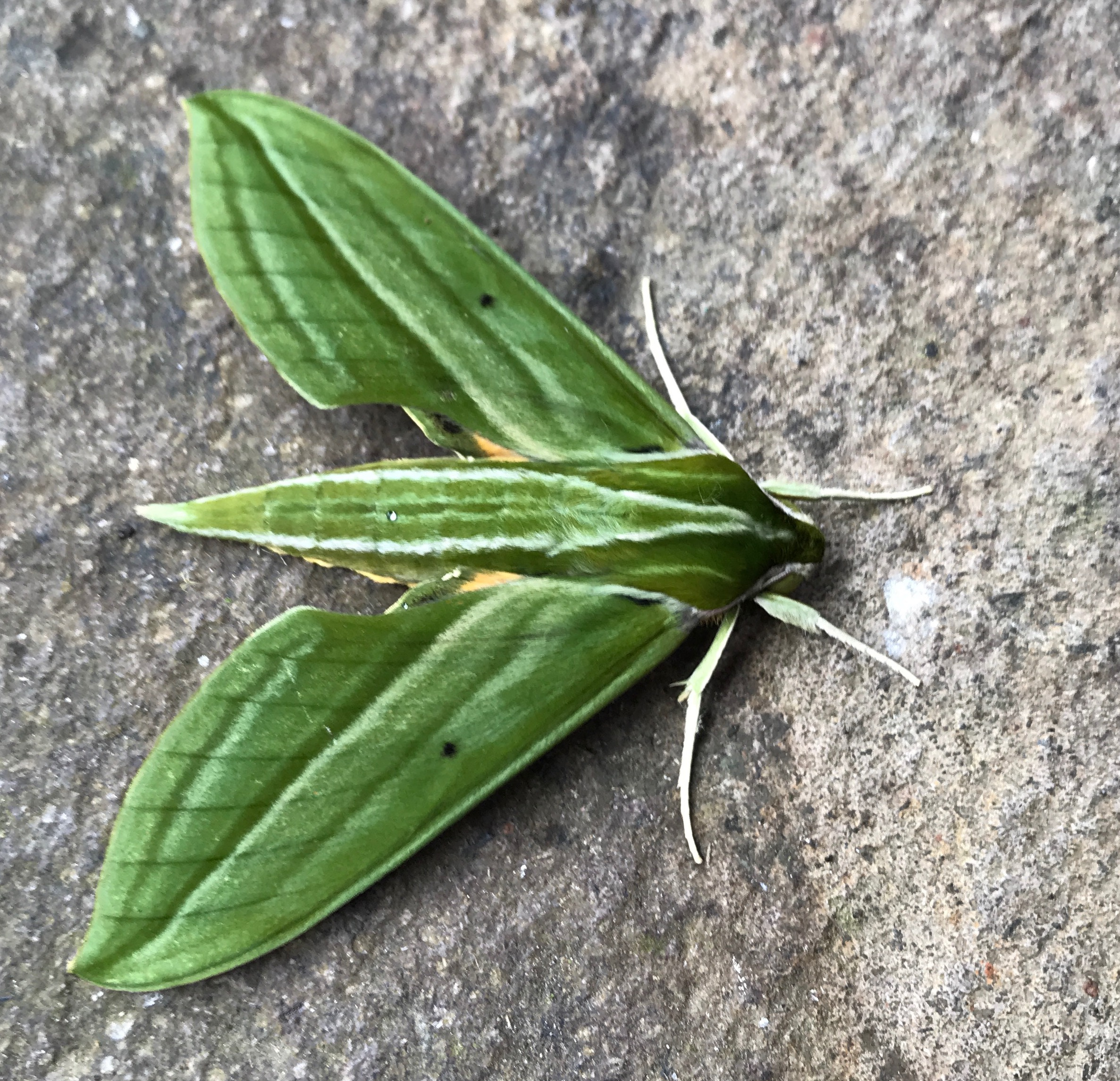
A sphinx moth, subfamily Macroglossinae, in Cibodas Botanical Garden, Java

The Sphingidae was formerly assigned its own exclusive superfamily, Sphingoidea, but it was found to be closely related to the Bombycidae and the Saturniidae, so the family is now included with the superfamily Bombycoidea. Following Hodges (1971) two subfamilies are accepted, namely the Sphinginae and Macroglossinae. Around 1,450 species of hawk moths are classified into around 200 genera. Some of the best-known hawk moth species are:

- Privet hawk moth (Sphinx ligustri)
- White-lined Sphinx (Hyles lineata)
- Death's-head hawk moth (Acherontia atropos)
- Lime hawk moth (Mimas tiliae)
- Poplar hawk moth (Laothoe populi)
- Convolvulus hawk moth (Agrius convolvuli)
- Catalpa sphinx (Ceratomia catalpae)
- Hummingbird hawk-moth (Macroglossum stellatarum)
- Elephant hawk moth (Deilephila elpenor)
- Vine hawk moth (Hippotion celerio)
- Spurge hawk moth (Hyles euphorbiae)
- Oleander hawk moth (Daphnis nerii)
- Pandora sphinx moth (Eumorpha pandorus)
- Tomato worm (Manduca quinquemaculata)
- Tobacco hornworm (Manduca sexta)

== See also ==
- Sphingidae species list
