= Acherontia =

Acherontia may refer to:

- Acherontia (city), a city in ancient Apulia, Italy
- Acherontia (moth), three species in the genus Acherontia
  - Acherontia atropos
  - Acherontia lachesis
  - Acherontia styx
- Acherontia (film), a 1972 Mexican film
