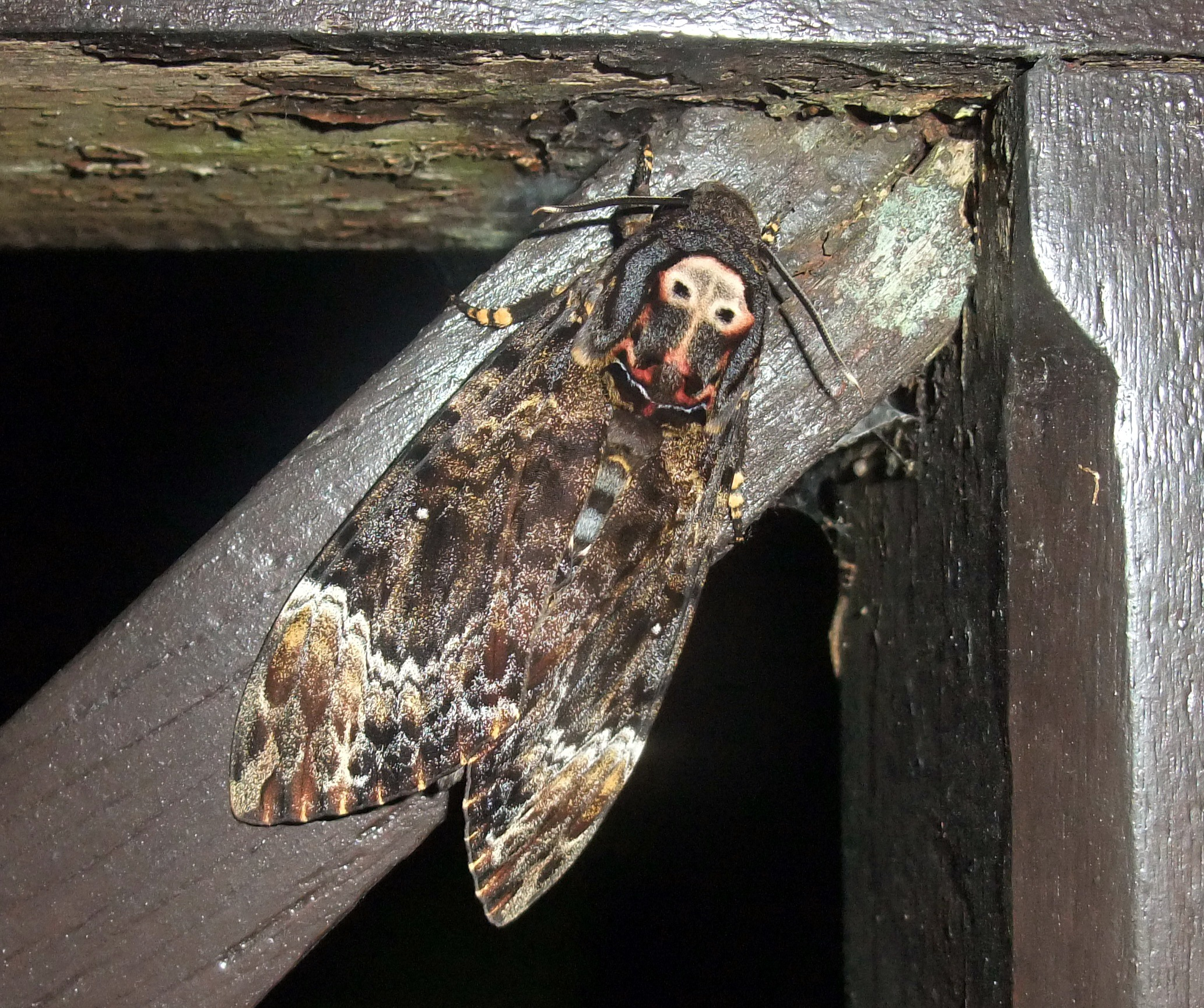

Scientific classification
- Kingdom: Animalia
- Phylum: Arthropoda
- Clade: Pancrustacea
- Class: Insecta
- Order: Lepidoptera
- Family: Sphingidae
- Genus: Acherontia
- Species: A. lachesis

Binomial name
- Acherontia lachesis (Fabricius, 1798)

Synonyms
- Sphinx lachesis Fabricius, 1798; Spectrum charon Billberg, 1820; Acherontia sojejimae Matsumura, 1908; Acherontia satanas Boisduval, 1836; Acherontia morta Hübner, 1819; Acherontia lethe Westwood, 1847; Acherontia circe Moore, 1858; Manduca lachesis atra Huwe, 1895; Acherontia lachesis submarginalis Dupont, 1941; Acherontia lachesis radiata Niepelt, 1931; Acherontia lachesis pallida Dupont, 1941; Acherontia lachesis fuscapex Bryk, 1944

= Acherontia lachesis =

Species of moth

Acherontia lachesis, the greater death's head hawkmoth or bee robber, is a large (up to 13 cm wingspan) sphingid moth found in India, Sri Lanka and much of the East Asian region. It is one of the three species of death's-head hawkmoth genus, Acherontia. The species was first described by Johan Christian Fabricius in 1798. It is nocturnal and very fond of honey; they can mimic the scent of honey bees so that they can enter a hive unharmed to get honey. Their tongue, which is stout and very strong, enables them to pierce the wax cells and suck the honey out. This species occurs throughout almost the entire Oriental region, from India, Pakistan and Nepal to the Philippines, and from southern Japan and the southern Russian Far East to Indonesia, where it attacks colonies of several different honey bee species. It has recently become established on the Hawaiian Islands.

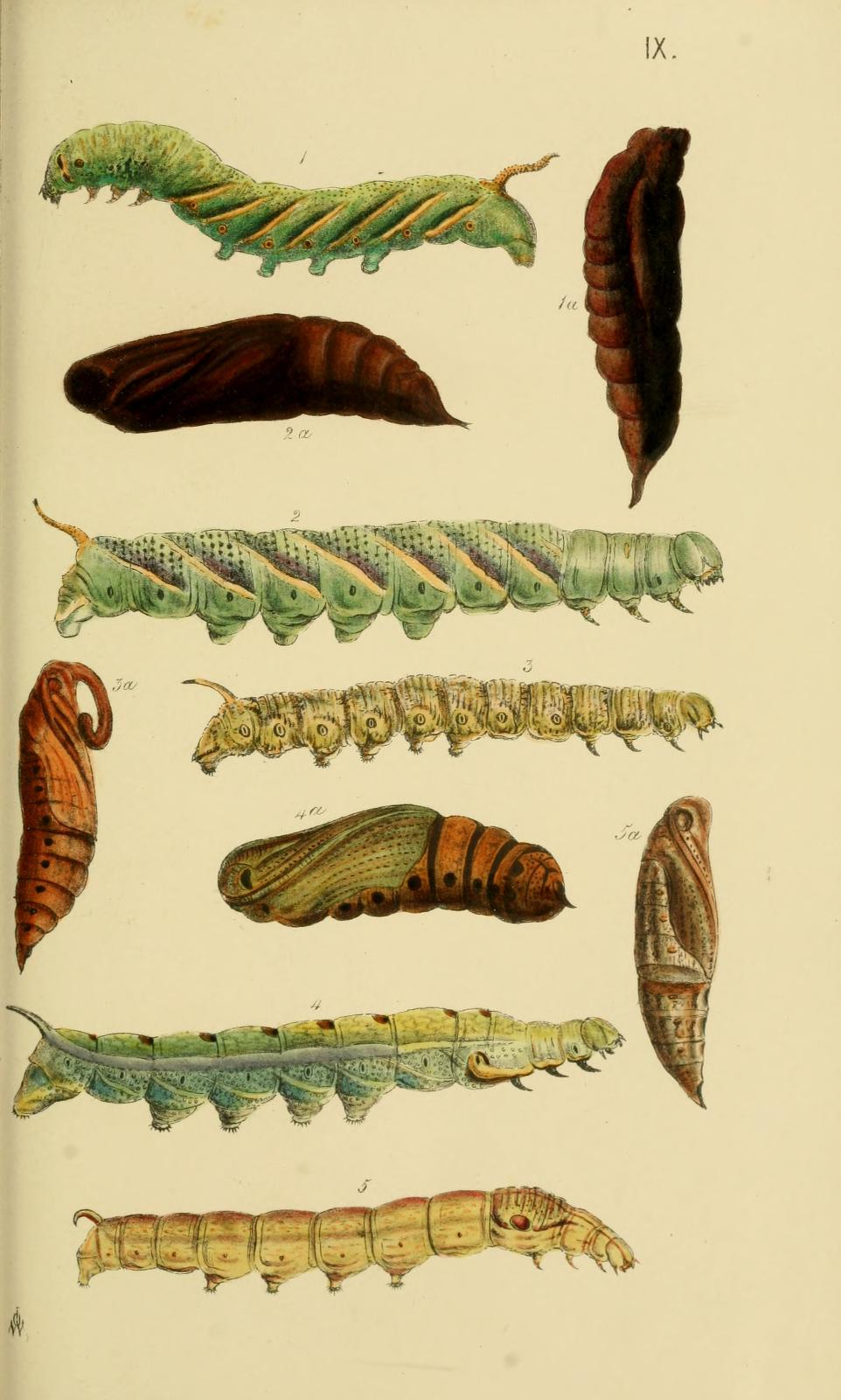
Larva (2) and pupa (2a) of Acherontia lachesis

== Description ==
A. lachesis is much larger than Acherontia styx. The segmental bands and grey stripe occupy so much of the abdomen that only small patches of yellow are left. The hindwing has a large black patch at the base. The medial and post-medial bands are so broad that only narrow bands of yellow remain. The ventral side of the abdomen is banded with black and the wings are banded with black and have a spot in the cell of each. the larva differs from A. styx in having blue streaks above the yellow ones; before pupating it turns brown and the oblique streaks disappear.

== Life history ==
Eggs are laid on a variety of host plants belonging to the families Solanaceae, Verbenaceae, Fabaceae, Oleaceae, Bignoniaceae, and others. Mature larvae can attain a length of 125 mm and occur in green, yellow and brownish-grey colour forms (most commonly grey), with oblique body stripes and a prickly tail horn that is curled at the extreme tip. When molested the caterpillar throws the head and anterior segments of the body from side to side, at the same time making a rapidly repeated clicking noise, which appears to be produced by the mandibles. The larva pupates by pushing its head into the earth, burying itself, and making an ovoid chamber about 15 cm below the surface in which it sheds its skin.

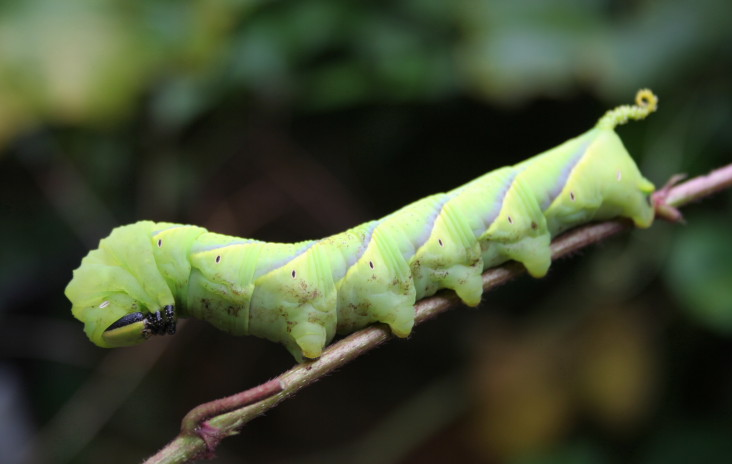
Larva

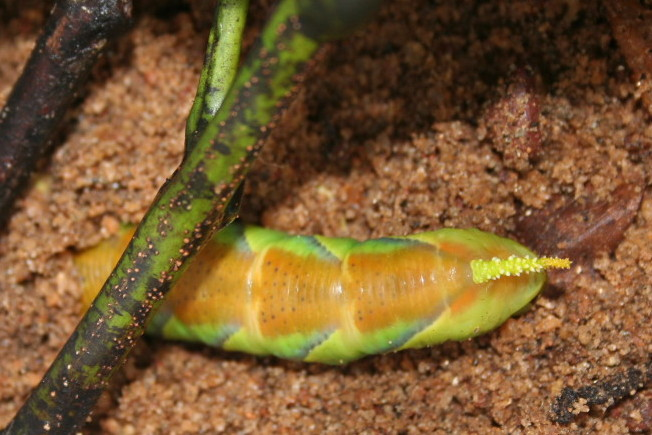
Larva burying itself to pupate under the soil

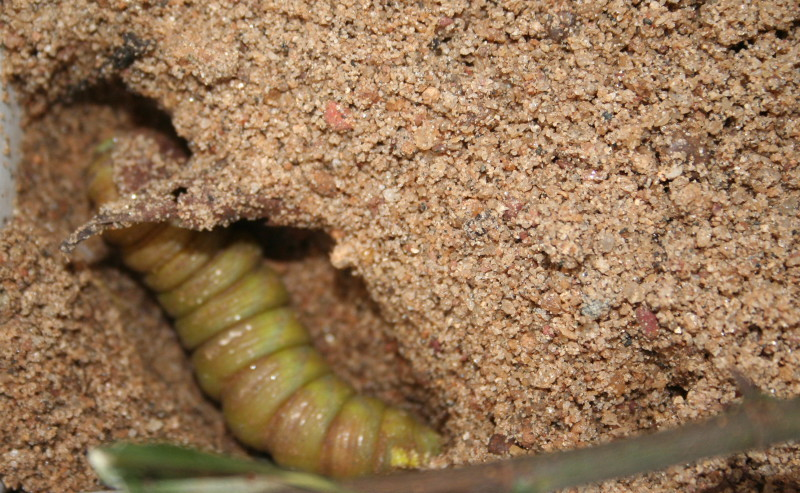
Pupating

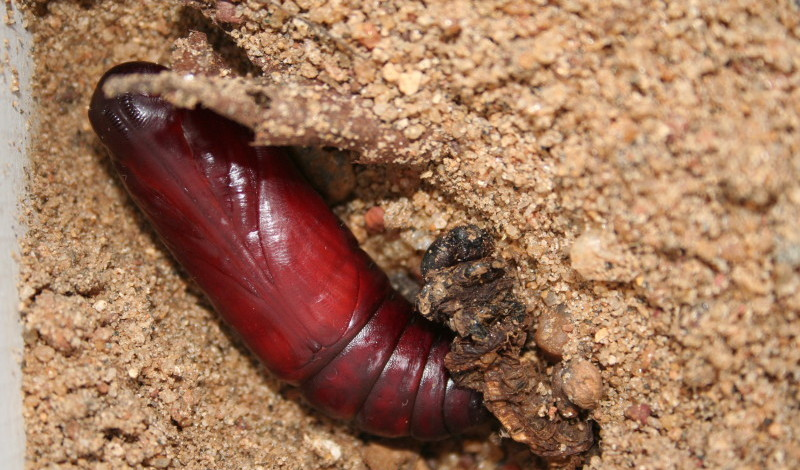
Pupa

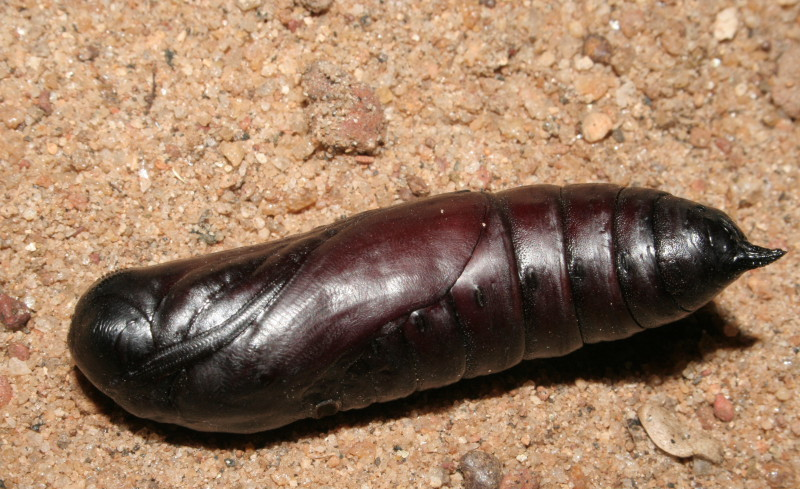
Pupa

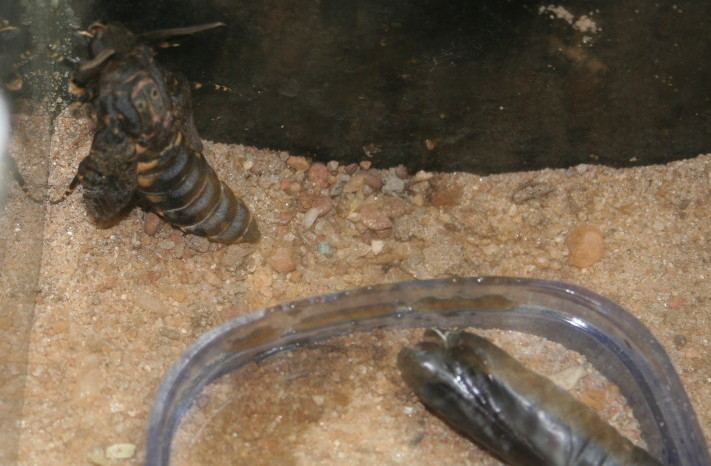
Emerging

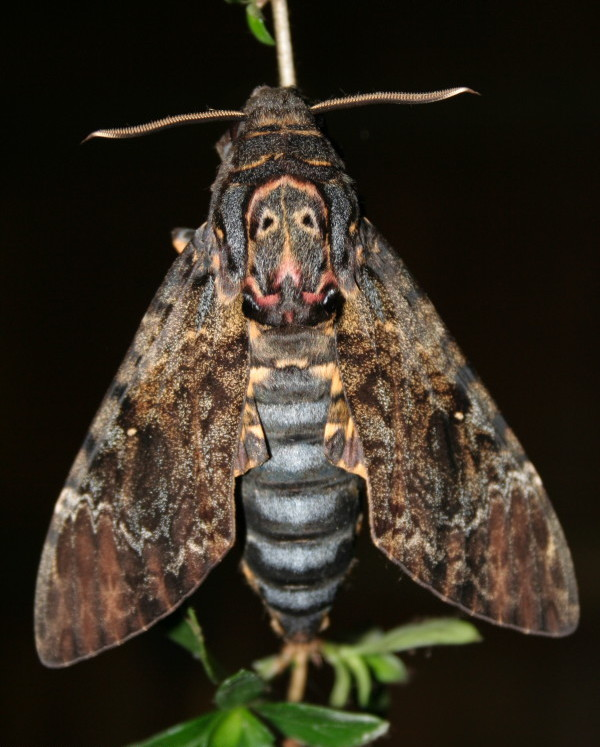
Imago (dorsal view)

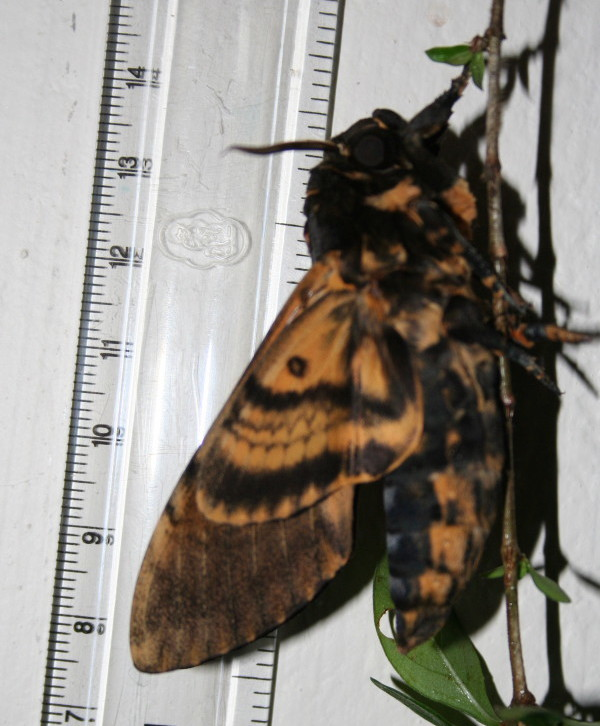
Imago (latera view)

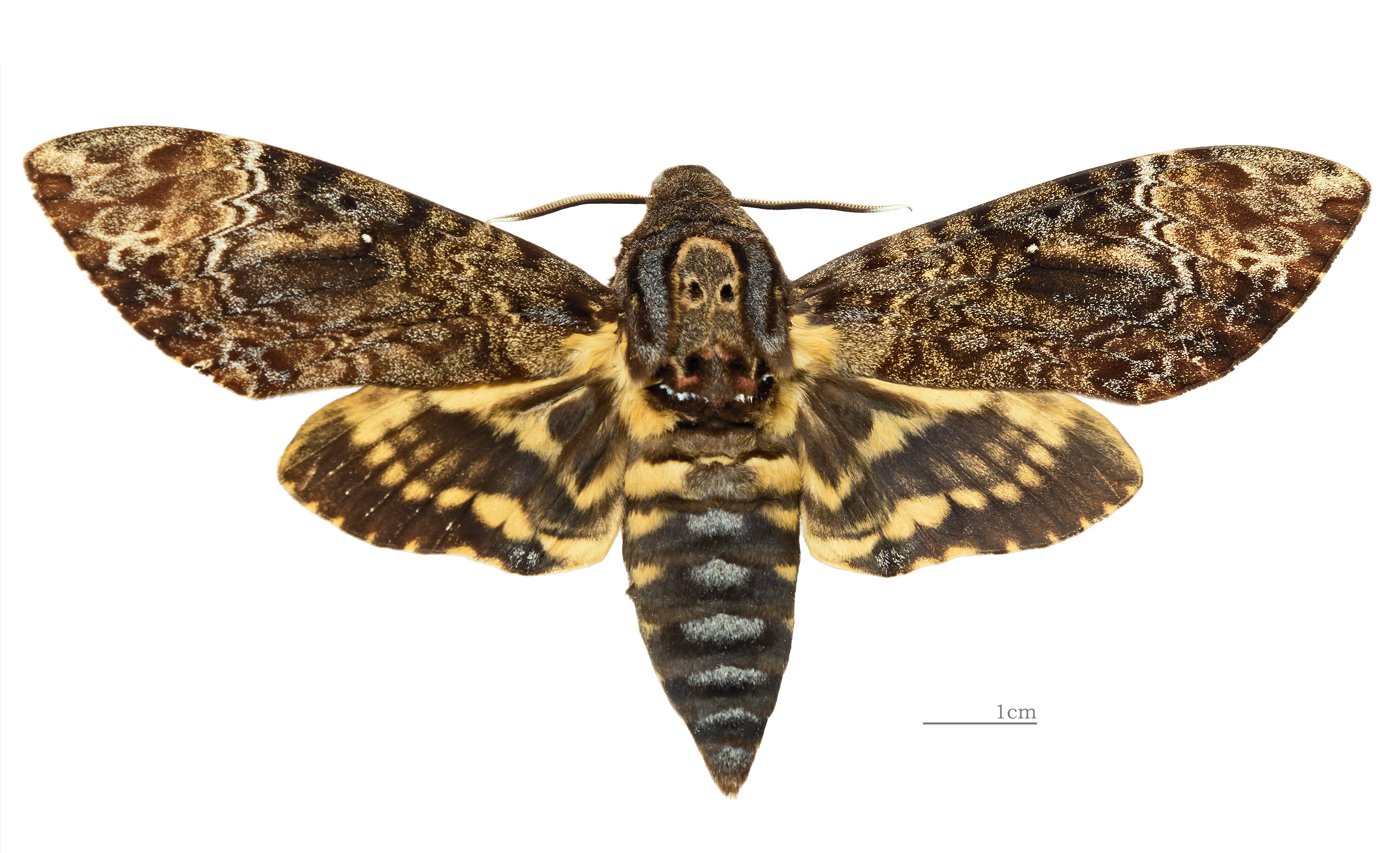
Female dorsal view (collected specimen)

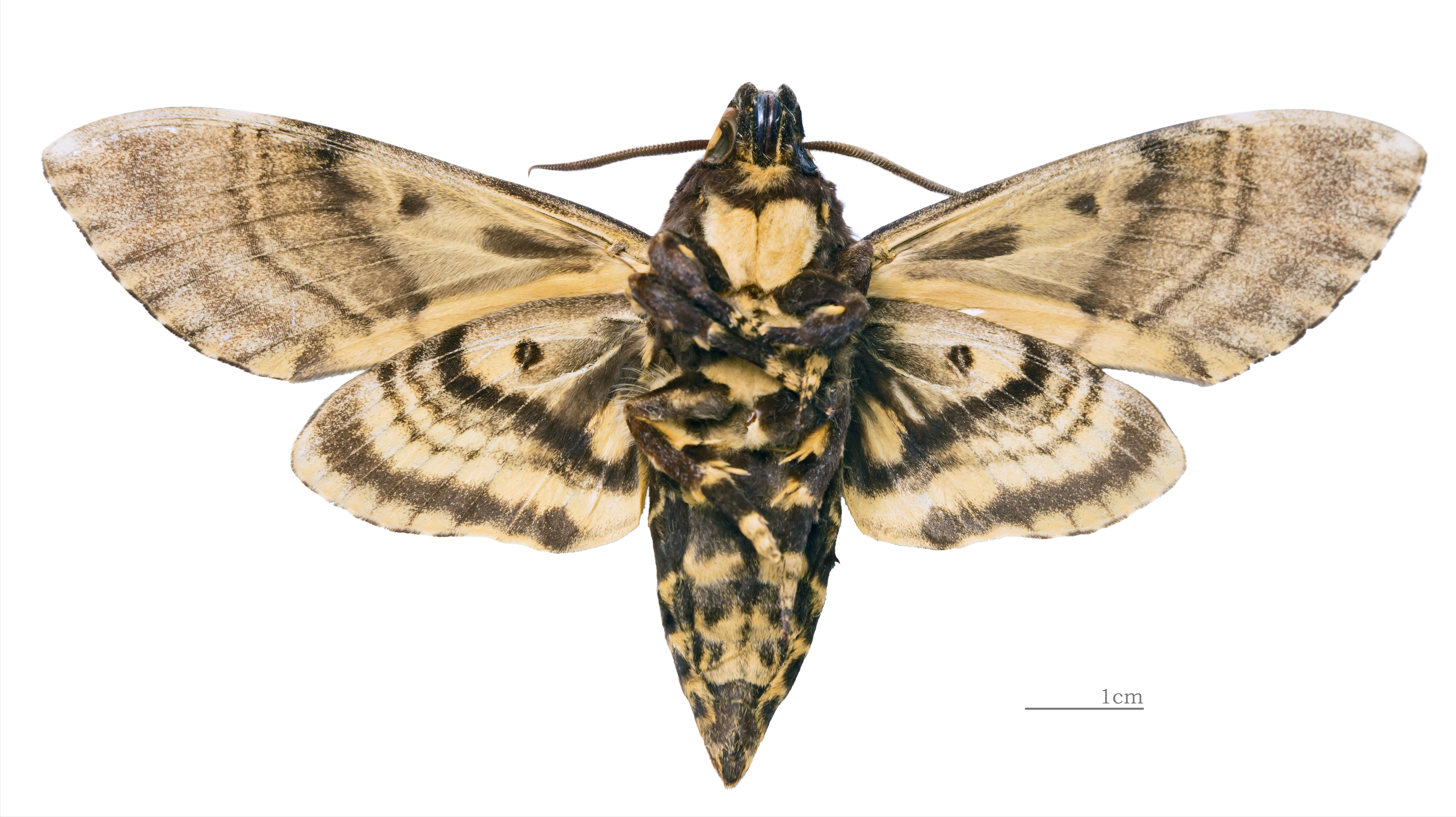
Female ventral view (collected specimen)

The larvae are often parasitised by tachinid flies.

== Subspecies ==
- Acherontia lachesis lachesis
- Acherontia lachesis diehli Eitschberger, 2003

== Ecology ==
The moth rests with the wings folded with the abdomen completely covered. When disturbed it raises its body from the surface on which it is sitting and partially opens and raises its wings and emits a squealing note. Notable predators are mostly parasitoids such as Amblyjoppa cognatoria, Quandrus pepsoides and Drino atropivora.

== Host plants ==
In their distribution countries, caterpillars are found on variety of plants such as Campsis grandiflora, Jasminum; Nicotiana tabacum; Tectona grandis; Datura; Ipomoea batatas; Clerodendrum kaempferi; Erythrina speciosa; Clerodendrum quadriloculare; Lantana camara; Sesamum indicum; Solanum spp., including: Solanum tuberosum, S. torvum, S. melongena; Stachytarpheta indica, Tithonia diversifolia; Spathodea campanulata; Vitex pinnata; Psilogramma menophron; and Clerodendrum inerme.

A. lachesis is not the species of death's head used in the promotional posters for The Silence of the Lambs. That is Acherontia atropos.
