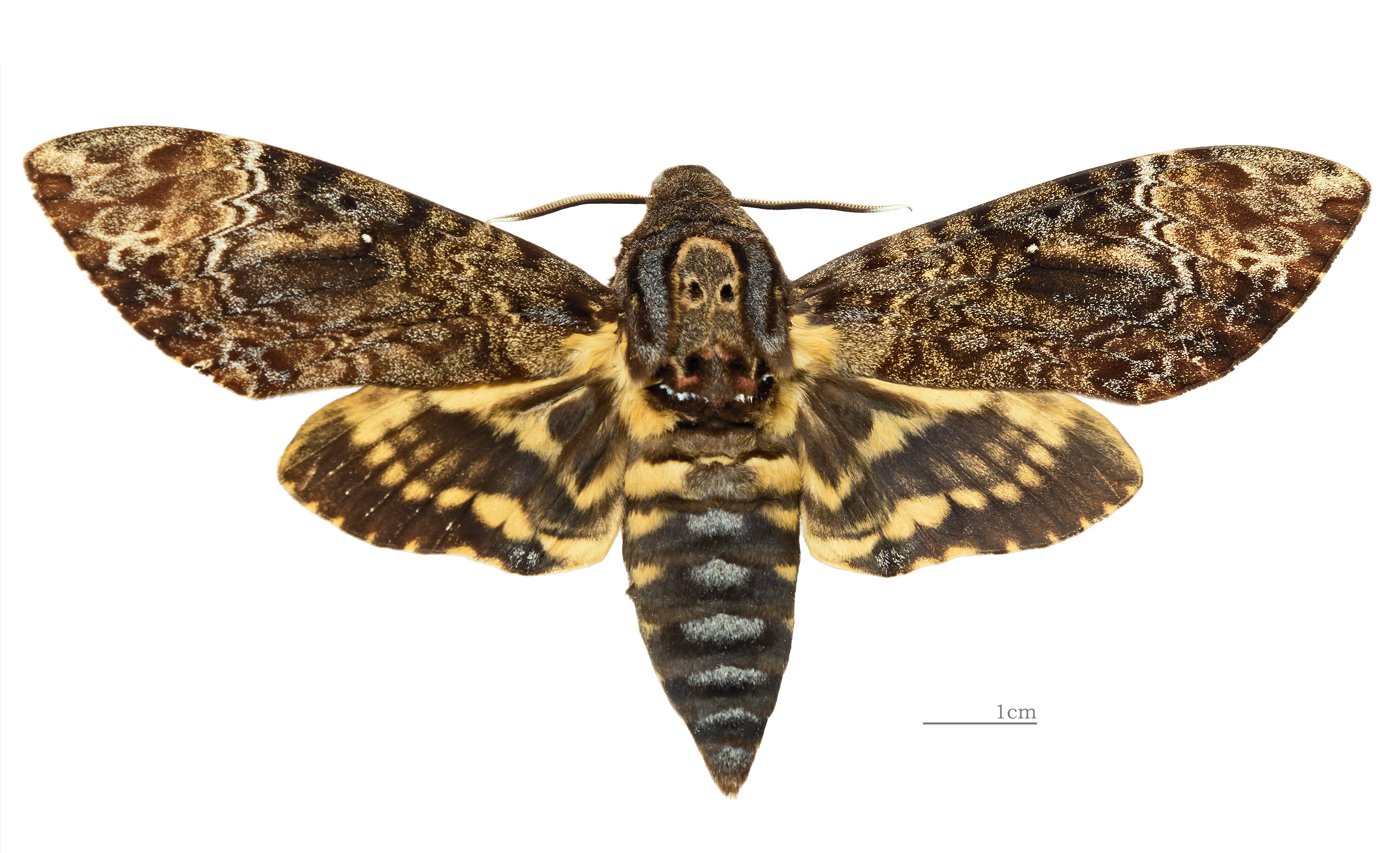
- Acherontia lachesis

Scientific classification
- Kingdom: Animalia
- Phylum: Arthropoda
- Clade: Pancrustacea
- Class: Insecta
- Order: Lepidoptera
- Family: Sphingidae
- Tribe: Acherontiini
- Genus: Acherontia; Laspeyres, 1809

Species
- A. atropos — African death's head hawkmoth A. styx — lesser death's head hawkmoth A. lachesis — greater death's head hawkmoth

= Death's-head hawkmoth =

Species of moth

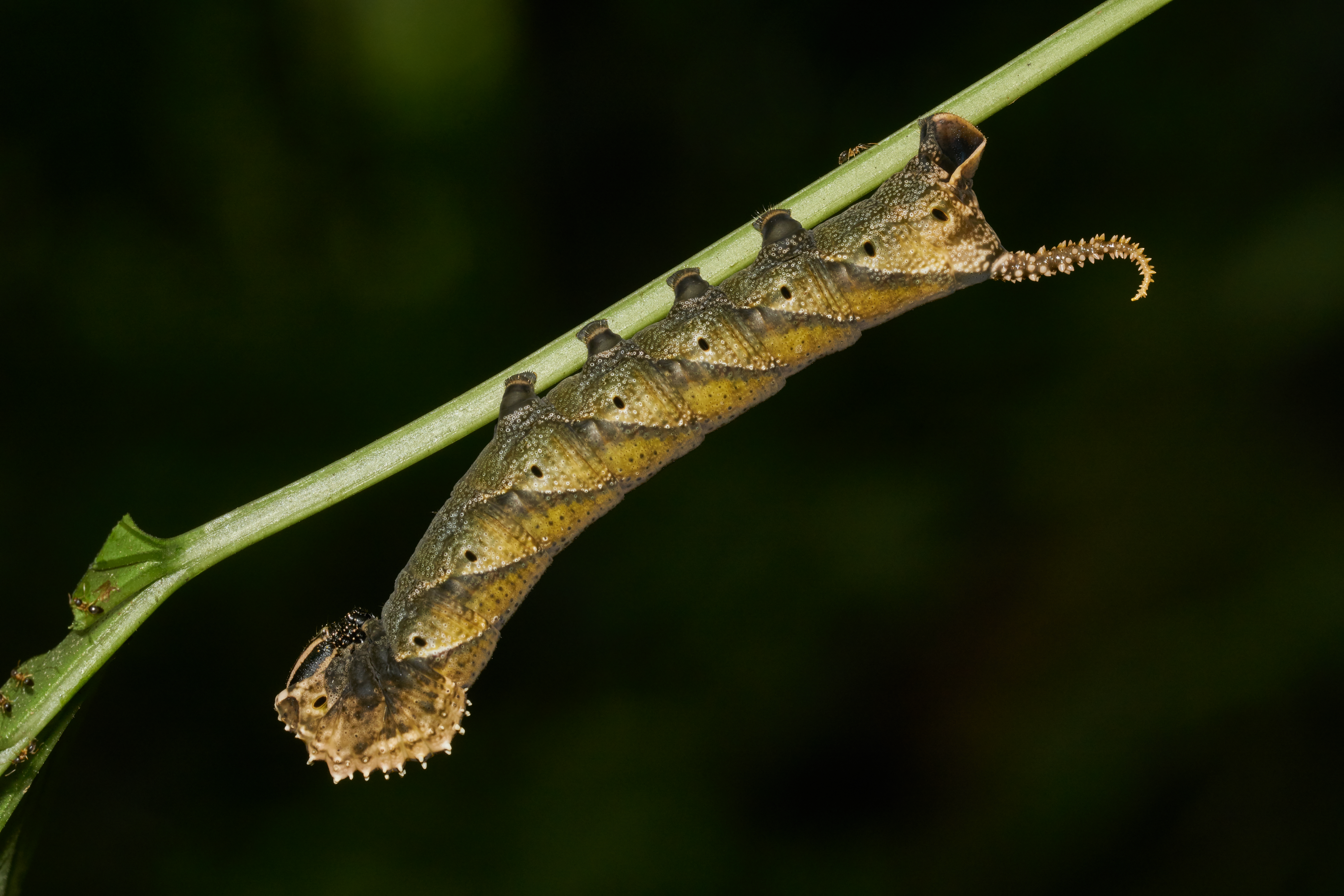
Larva

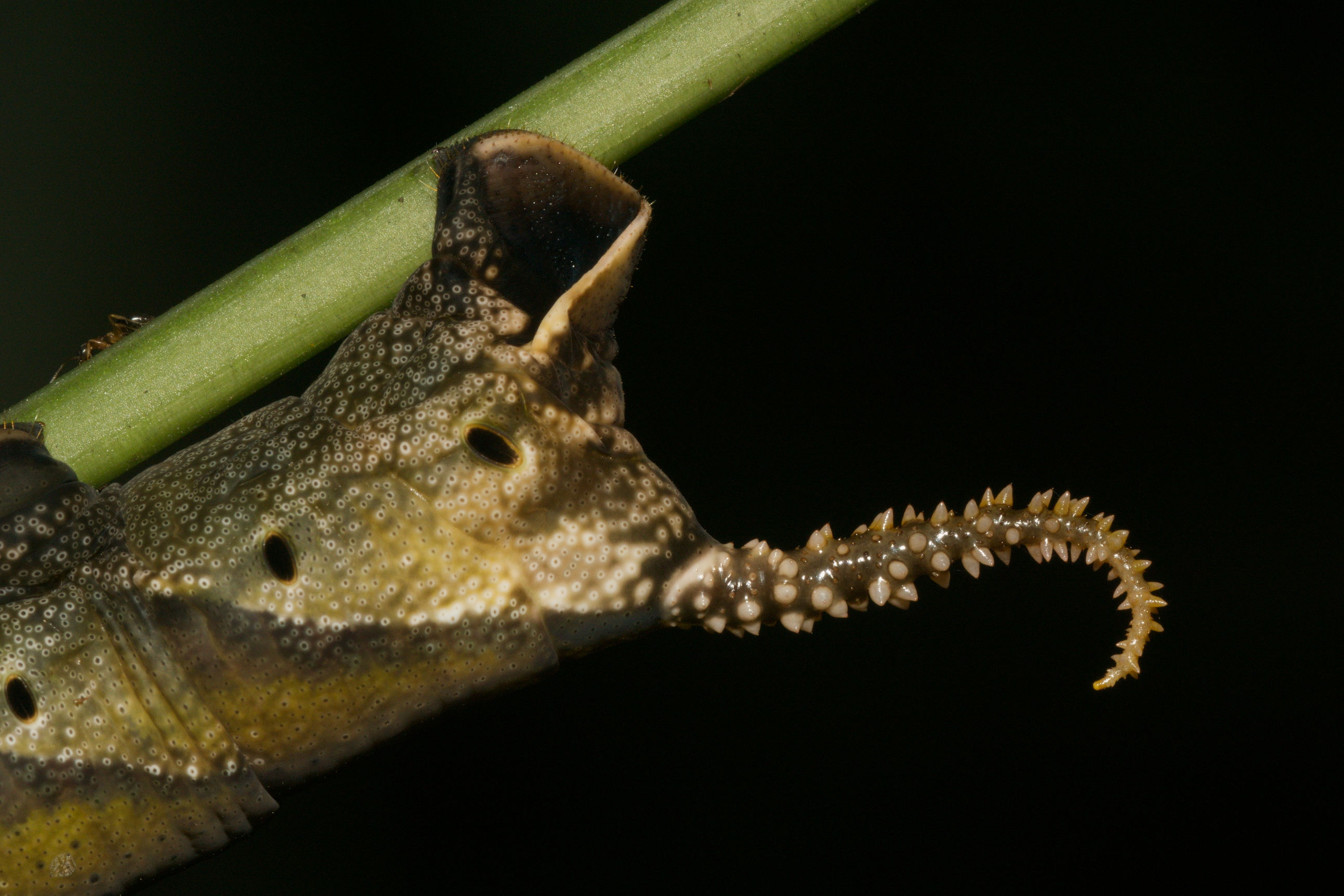
Thornlike horn on the back

The name death's-head hawkmoth refers to any of three moth species of the genus Acherontia (Acherontia atropos, Acherontia styx and Acherontia lachesis). The former species is found throughout Africa and in Europe, the latter two are Asian; most uses of the common name refer to the African species. These moths are easily distinguishable by the vaguely human skull-shaped pattern of markings on the thorax. They are large nocturnal moths with brown and yellow or orange coloring, and all three species are fairly similar in size, coloration and life cycle.

== Description ==
The African death's-head hawkmoth (Acherontia atropos) is the largest moth in the British Isles (though not in Africa), with a wingspan of 12 cm (5 in); it is a powerful flier, having sometimes been found on ships far from land. The forewings are a mottled dark brown and pale brown, and the hind wings are orangey-buff with two narrow dark bands parallel with the hind margin. The abdomen is a similar orangey-brown, with a broad, dark dorsal stripe. The most notable feature is a patch of short yellowish hairs on the thorax that gives the impression of depicting a human skull. It is a striking insect, but is seldom seen because it flies late in the night.

A 2020 study describes how, when viewed upside-down, Acherontia atropos creates an illusion of a head with eyes: the mark on its thorax likened to a human skull is the "nose", with the skull's eye-sockets resembling nostrils. Spots on its forewings can be seen as eyes, and various other markings and features can be interpreted as ears, muzzle and lips. This illusion is also present in Agrius convolvuli (convolvulus hawk-moth) and five other species, with the study author suggesting that the function of the illusion of an eyed head is "almost certainly to deter, distract or otherwise deceive predators".

The caterpillar of the African death's-head hawkmoth is also sturdy and somewhat variable in colour, being some shade of buff, green or brown, with seven diagonal blue lines. At the rear is a curved, thornlike horn. It can attain a length of 5 to 6 in (13 to 15 cm). The other two species of death's-head hawkmoth similarly have three larval color forms: typically, green, brown and yellow. The pupa is stout and reddish-brown, and is formed 8 to 10 in (20 to 25 cm) under the ground in a chamber the size of a large hen's egg.

== Development ==
Eggs are laid singly under old leaves of a host plant and are green or greyish-blue. In the greater death's-head hawkmoth the host plant is usually the potato, but may also be tomato, woody nightshade, jasmine or common buckthorn. None of the three species is restricted to a single family of host plant, but hosts are typically in the families Solanaceae, Verbenaceae, Oleaceae, Bignoniaceae and others. The larvae are stout, reaching 120–130 mm, with a prominent tail horn. Larvae do not move much, and will click their mandibles or even bite if threatened. When mature, they burrow underground and excavate a chamber where they pupate.

== Behaviour ==
These moths have several unusual features. All three species have the ability to emit a loud chirp if irritated. The sound is produced by inhaling and expelling air, which vibrates the epipharynx like an accordion, often accompanied by flashing of the brightly colored abdomen in a further attempt to deter predators. The chirp of the death's head hawkmoth takes approximately one-fifth of a second. A study by National Geographic found that the epipharynx was originally built to suck up honey, but later evolved to produce sound.

Adults of all three species are commonly observed raiding beehives of different species of honey bee; A. atropos only invades colonies of the well-known western honey bee, Apis mellifera, and feeds on both nectar and honey. They can move about in hives without being disturbed because they mimic the scent of the bees and are not recognised as intruders. If their disguise is discovered, the moth's thick waxy cuticle helps to protect it against stings.

Leaves of the potato plant contain calystegines, a group of polyhydroxy alkaloids, which are toxic. The larva of A. atropos feeding on potato foliage accumulates these alkaloids.

== In popular culture ==
The species names atropos, lachesis and styx are all from Greek myth and related to death. The first refers to the member of the three Moirai who cuts the threads of life of all beings; the second to the Moira who allots the correct amount of life to a being; and the last refers to the river of the dead. In addition the genus name Acherontia is derived from Acheron, a river of Greek myth that was said to be a branch of the river Styx.

According to John Jarvis Bisset in his 1875 work Sport and War in South Africa, "The death's-head moth, as found in South Africa, is about the size and length of a man's finger, and it has a most perfect death's-head-and-marrowbones painted by Nature with all her beauty on its back. The legend both amongst the Dutch and the natives of the Cape of Good Hope, is, that this moth has a sting, and that a puncture from it causes instant death. This moth is generally found in beehives, particularly when they are in the ground or in decayed trees."

The skull-like pattern and its fanciful associations with the supernatural and evil have fostered superstitious fears of Acherontia species, particularly Acherontia atropos, perhaps because it is the most widely known. The moths' sharp, mouse-like squeaking intensify the effect. Nor is this a new attitude: during the mid-19th century, entomologist Edward Newman, having earlier mentioned the mark on the thorax wrote: "However, let the cause of the noise be what it may, the effect is to produce the most superstitious feelings among the uneducated, by whom it is always regarded with feelings of awe and terror."

According to legend, the species (atropos) was first seen in Britain at the time of the execution of King Charles I, but it is more likely to have simply become more common by that time, having arrived with the first transportation of potatoes some decades earlier. Though rarer, it is still occasionally sighted in the country.

Edgar Allan Poe's short story The Sphinx describes a close encounter with a death's-head sphinx moth, describing it as "the genus Sphinx, of the family Crepuscularia of the order Lepidoptera."

These moths have often been featured in art, such as by German artist Sulamith Wülfing and English artist William Holman Hunt in his 1851 painting The Hireling Shepherd.

Films such as Un Chien Andalou (1929, by Luis Buñuel and Salvador Dalí) and the 1991 film The Silence of the Lambs (and in Chapter 33 of the source novel, whereas in Chapter 14 a different moth species is used, the black witch moth) feature the moth. The death's-head moth also featured in the 1968 horror film The Blood Beast Terror starring Peter Cushing. The species Acherontia atropos is mentioned, though the costume of the human-moth hybrid creature is not an accurate representation of the moth. The moth plays a central role in the 2015 Taiwanese horror film The Tag-Along.

In 2018 survival horror game, Remothered: Tormented Fathers by Italian artist Chris Darril, they represent both the transformation and the human psyche. They also work as a parasite which interfere with people's memories, old repressed events, and feelings of guilt.

== Gallery ==
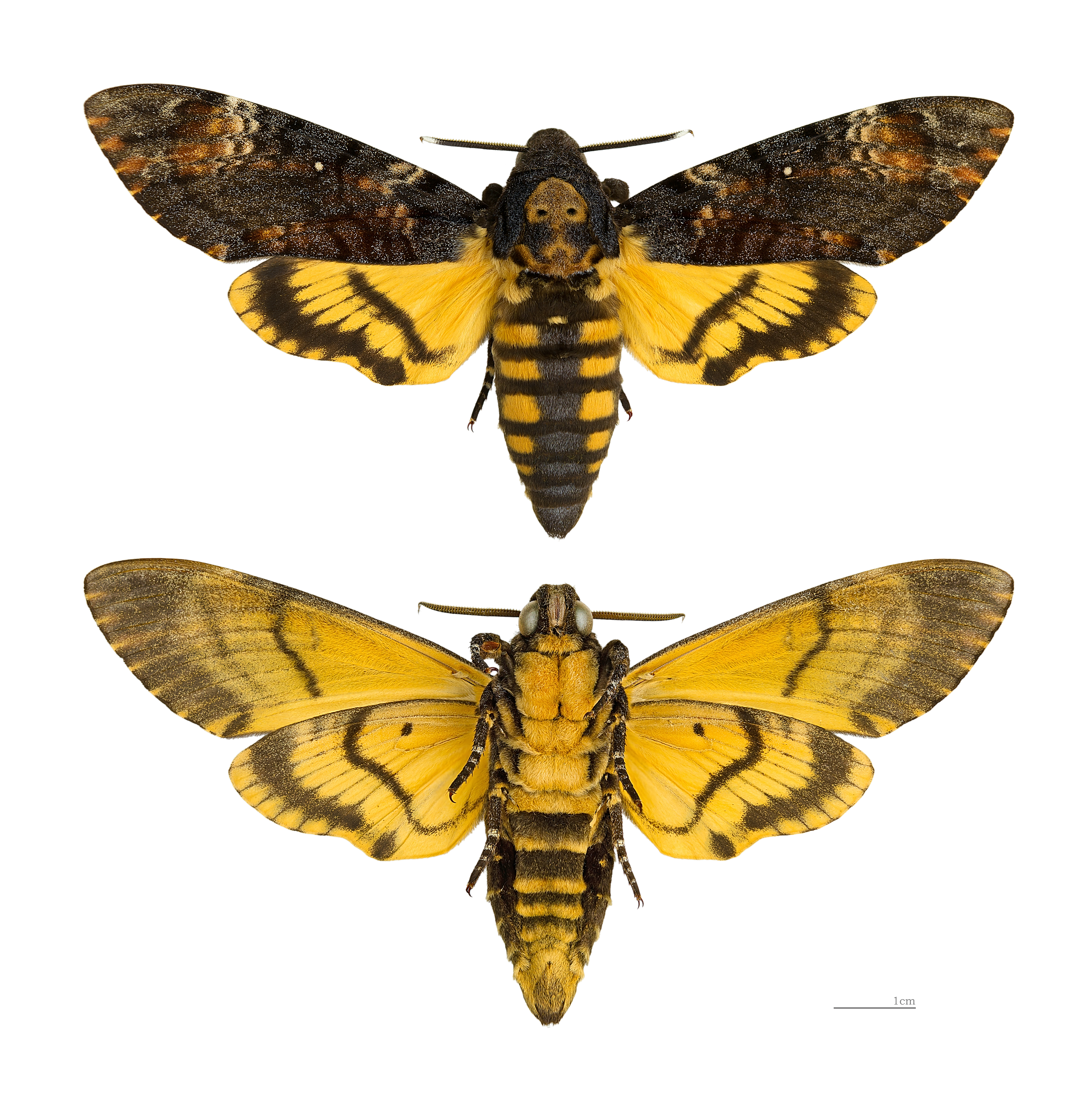
Acherontia atropos

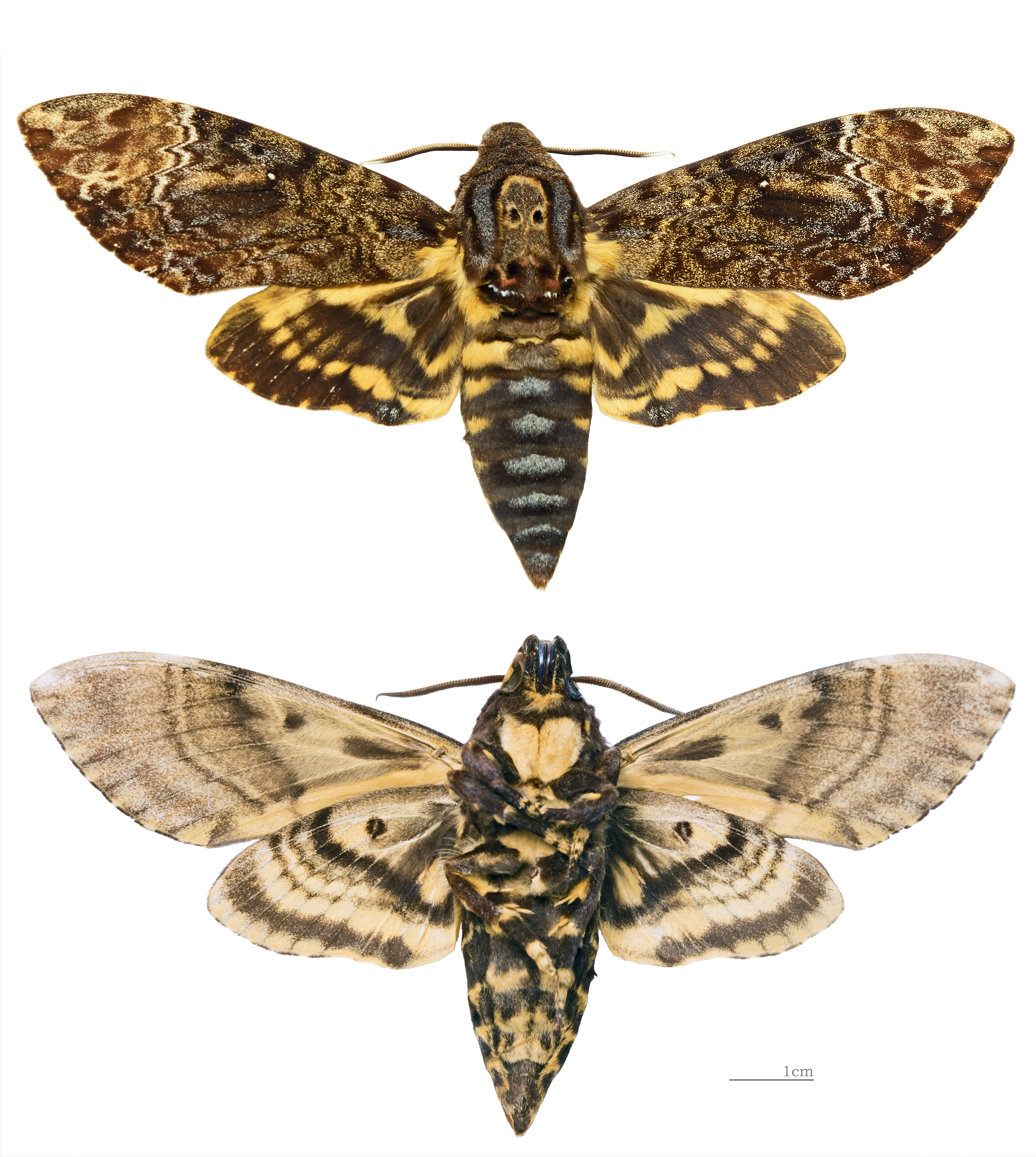
Acherontia lachesis

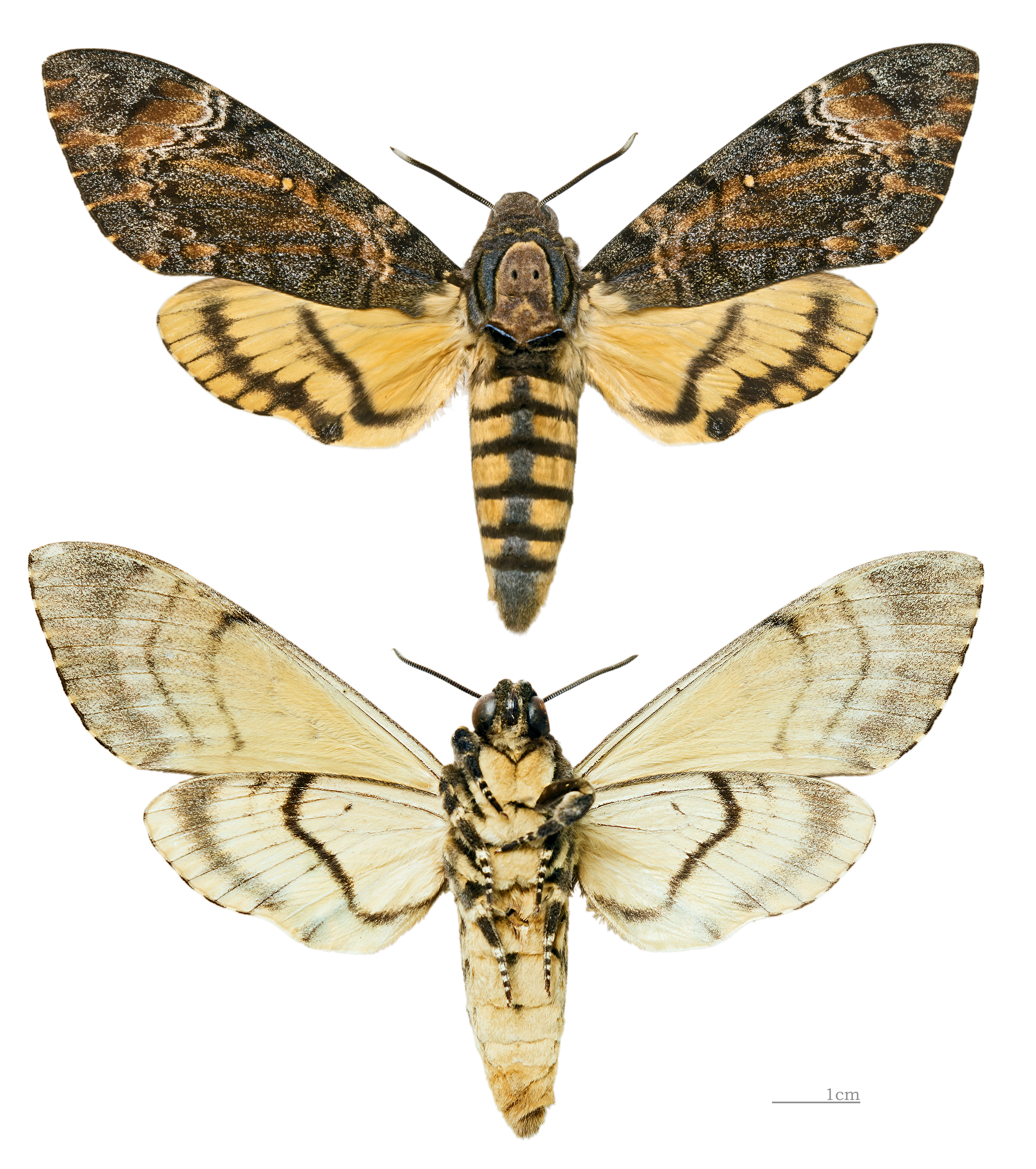
Acherontia styx

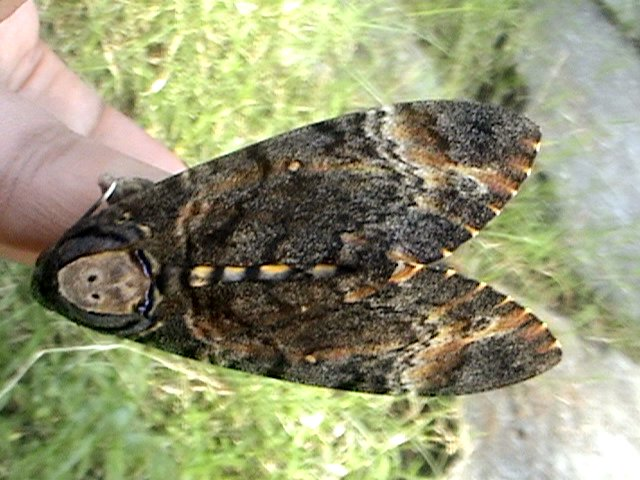
Acherontia styx

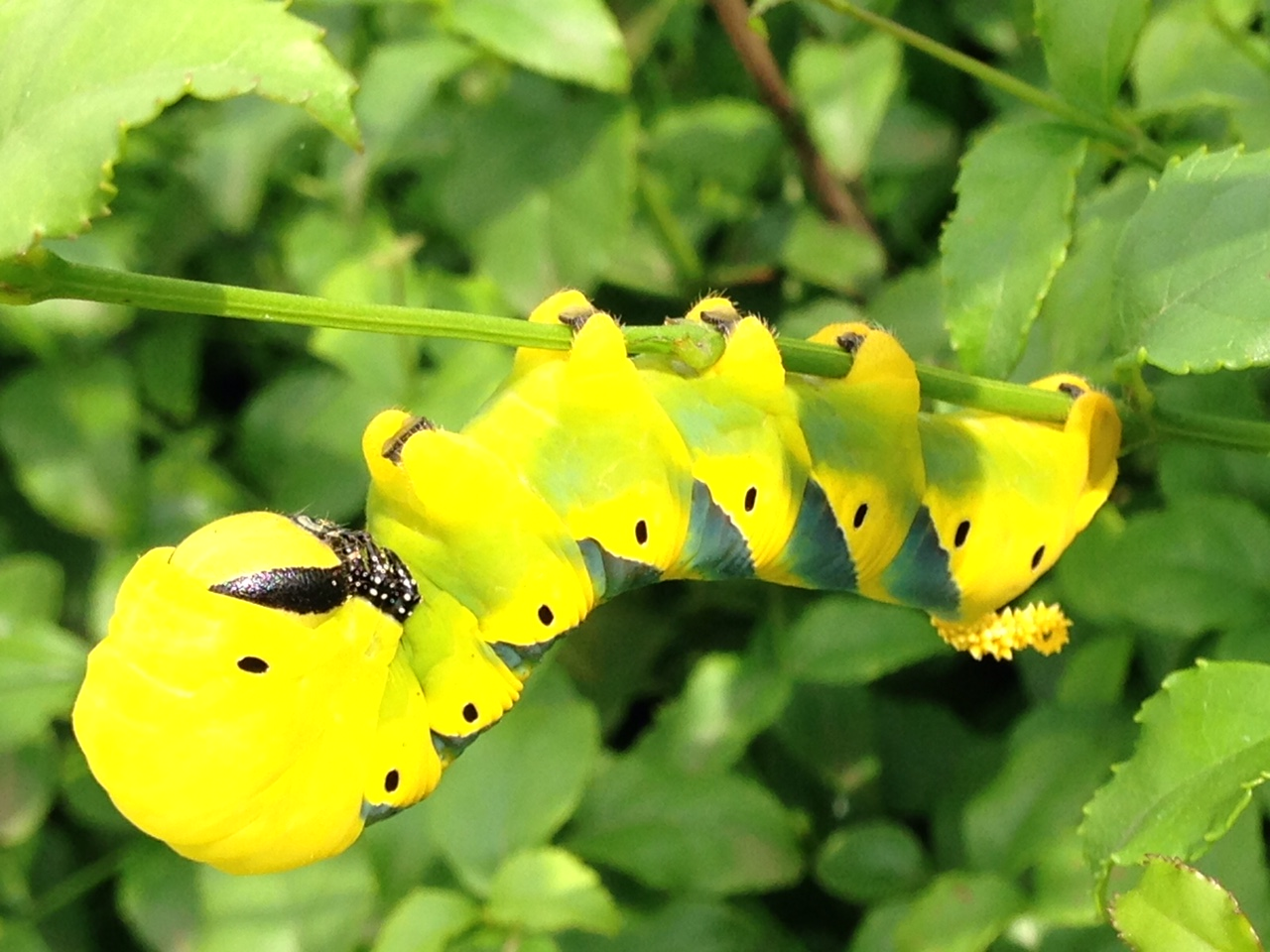
Larva of Acherontia atropos
