= Acherontia (city) =

Acherontia (Ancient Greek: Ἀχεροντίς or Αχεροντία) was a small town of ancient Apulia, near the frontiers of Lucania, situated about 14 miles (23 km) south of Venusia, and 6 miles (9.7 km) southeast of Ferentum. Its position on a lofty hill is alluded to by Horace in a well-known passage. The modern town of Acerenza retains the site as well as name of the ancient one. It is built on a hill of considerable elevation, precipitous on three sides, and affording only a very steep approach on the fourth. It seems to have been always but a small town, and is not mentioned by any ancient geographer; but the strength of its position gave it importance in a military point of view: and during the wars of the Goths against the generals of Justinian, it was occupied by Totila with a garrison, and became one of the chief strongholds of the Gothic leaders throughout the contest. Whether the reading of Acherunto in Livy, refers to the same place is disputed.
