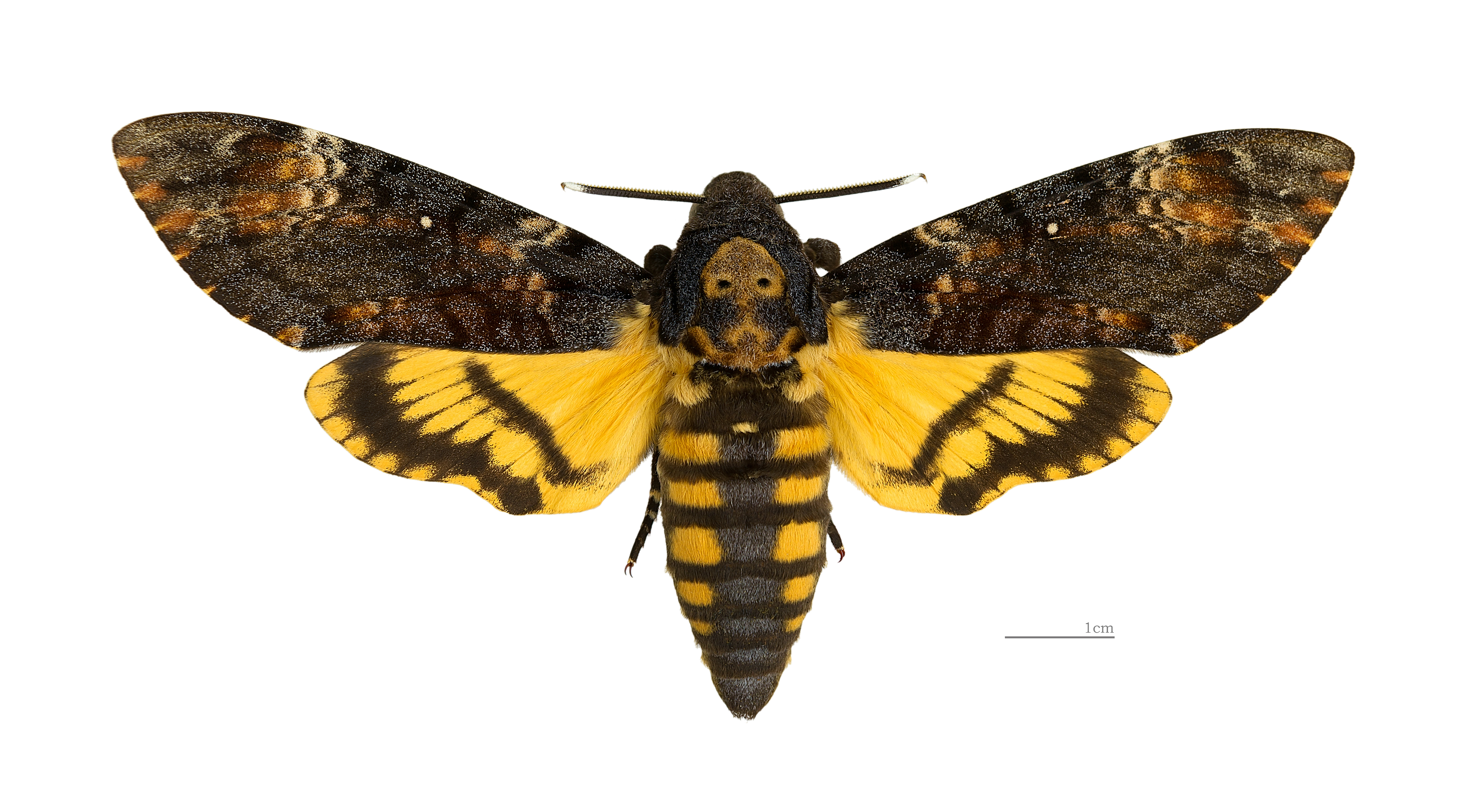
- male
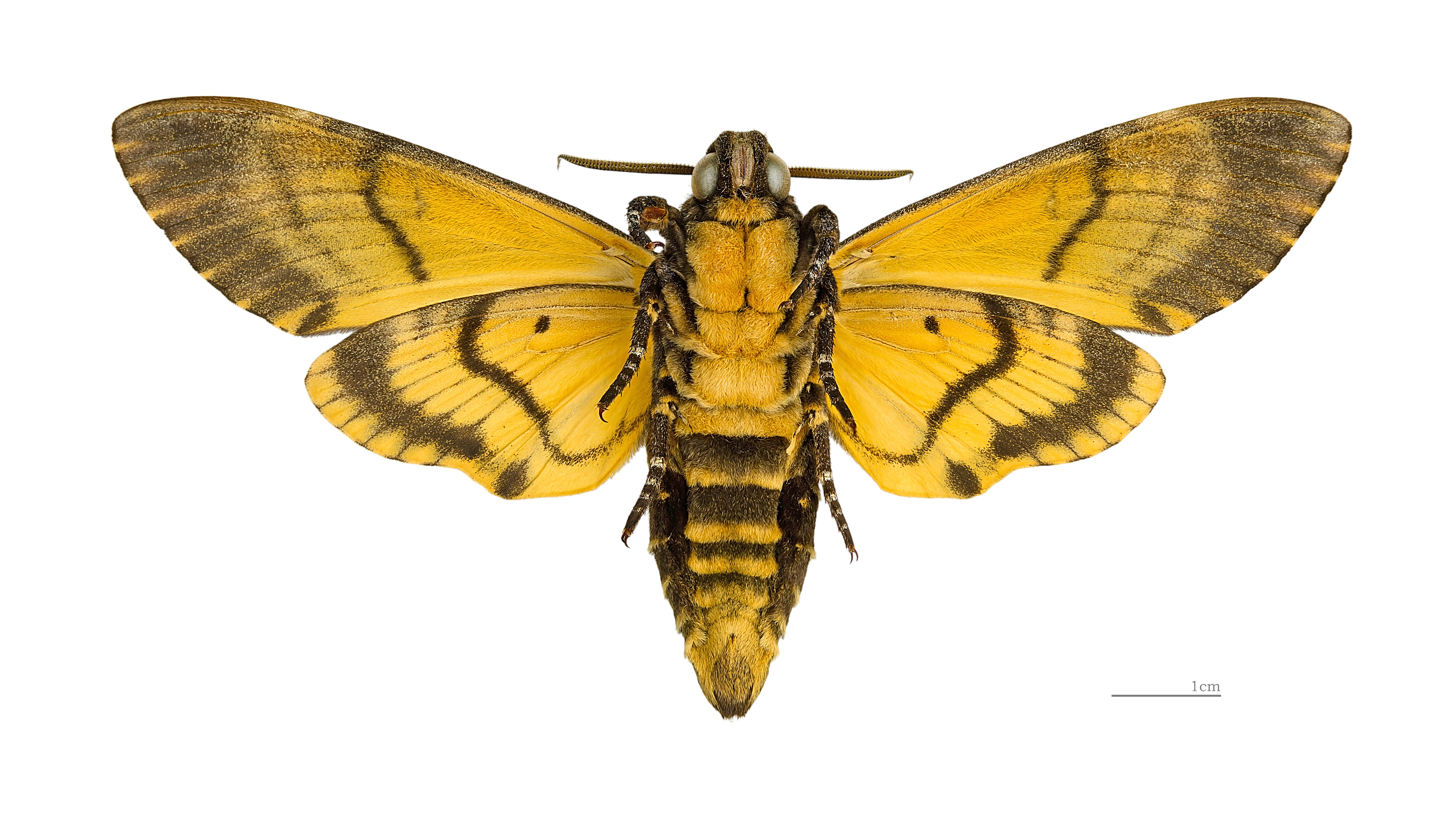
- male underside

Scientific classification
- Kingdom: Animalia
- Phylum: Arthropoda
- Clade: Pancrustacea
- Class: Insecta
- Order: Lepidoptera
- Family: Sphingidae
- Genus: Acherontia
- Species: A. atropos

Binomial name
- Acherontia atropos (Linnaeus, 1758)
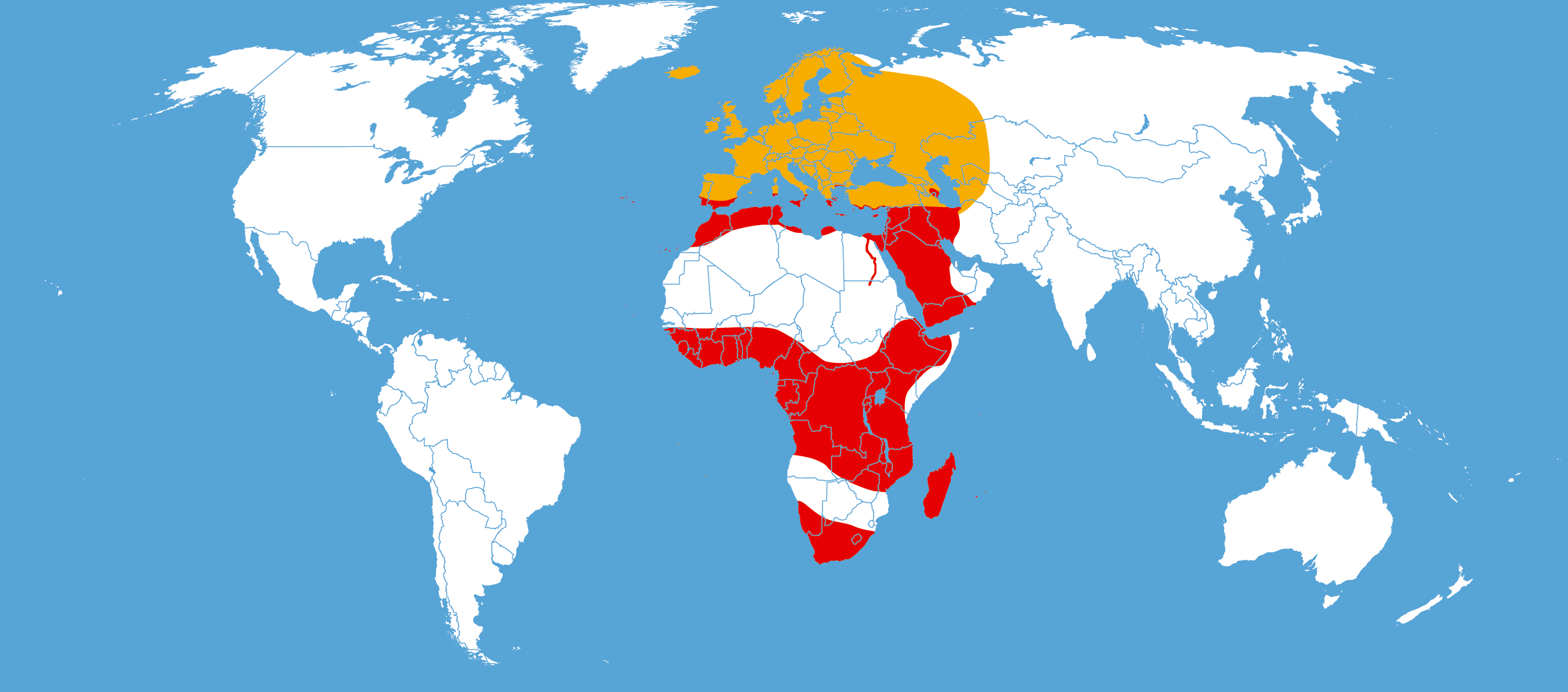
- Distribution map All year distribution Summer distribution possible

Synonyms
- Sphinx atropos Linnaeus, 1758; Acherontia solani Oken, 1815; Acherontia sculda Kirby, 1877; Acherontia atropos conjuncta Tutt, 1904; Acherontia atropos extensa Tutt, 1904; Acherontia atropos flavescens Tutt, 1904; Acherontia atropos imperfecta Tutt, 1904; Acherontia atropos intermedia Tutt, 1904; Acherontia atropos obsoleta Tutt, 1904; Acherontia atropos suffusa Tutt, 1904; Acherontia atropos variegata Tutt, 1904; Acherontia atropos virgata Tutt, 1904; Acherontia atropos violacea Lambillion, 1905; Acherontia atropos charon Closs, 1910; Acherontia atropos diluta Closs, 1911; Acherontia atropos obscurata Closs, 1917; Acherontia atropos myosotis Schawerda, 1919; Acherontia atropos confluens Dannehl, 1925; Acherontia atropos moira Dannehl, 1925; Acherontia atropos pulverata Cockayne, 1953; Acherontia atropos radiata Cockayne, 1953; Acherontia atropos griseofasciata Lempke, 1959

= Acherontia atropos =

African death's head hawkmoth

Species of moth

Acherontia atropos, the African death's-head hawkmoth, is the most widely recognized of three species within the genus Acherontia (the other two being Acherontia lachesis and Acherontia styx). It is most commonly identified by the vaguely skull-shaped pattern adorning the thorax, the characteristic from which its common and scientific names are derived. The species was first given its scientific name by Carl Linnaeus in his 1758 10th edition of Systema Naturae.

Death's-head hawk moths are large, ranging from 3.5 to 5 inches (80–120 mm) as adults. The upper wings are dark, creating a stark contrast between them and the lower wings, which range from a bright yellow to a light cream, yellow being the more common.

A. atropos appears in popular fiction and media, including The Silence of the Lambs (1991), Dracula (1958), and The Blood Beast Terror (1967).

It is commonly found in Southern Europe and throughout much of Africa, from where it is considered to be a native species. Annually, A. atropos migrates to parts of Great Britain, most numerously to the British Isles, where it is less commonly seen than in its native place of residency. However, sometimes it appears as far north as above the Arctic Circle, e.g. in northern Sweden (68°12’21.3”N 21°50’18.1”E).

== Description ==
The African death's-head hawkmoth (Acherontia atropos) is a large hawk moth, the largest moth in the British Isles and several other regions it inhabits, with a wingspan of 5 in (13 cm) (or 80–120 mm); it is a powerful flier, having sometimes been found on ships far from land. The forewings are a mottled dark brown and pale brown, and the hind wings are orangey-buff with two narrow dark bands parallel with the hind margin. The abdomen is a similar orangey-brown, with a broad, dark dorsal stripe. The most notable feature is a patch of short yellowish hairs on the thorax that gives the impression of depicting a human skull. It is a striking insect, but is seldom seen because it flies late in the night.

Its wing and body structure is typical of that seen in the family Sphingidae. The upper set of wings are brown with hints of yellow, amber, charcoal and cream; the lower wings are yellow with two brown stripes fashioned in waves extending diagonally across the surface. At rest, the wings of the moth fold downwards, concealing the hindwings behind the forewings. The abdomen of A. atropos is robust and is covered in brown, feathery down. Yellow striping that highly resembles the colour patterns of a hornet extends part way across each abdominal segment.

A 2020 study describes how, when viewed upside-down, Acherontia atropos creates an illusion of a head with eyes: the mark on its thorax likened to a human skull is the "nose", with the skull's eye-sockets resembling nostrils. Spots on its forewings can be seen as eyes, and various other markings and features can be interpreted as ears, muzzle and lips. This illusion is also present in Agrius convolvuli (convolvulus hawk-moth) and five other species, with the study author suggesting that the function of the illusion of an eyed head is "almost certainly to deter, distract or otherwise deceive predators".

The species shows sexual dimorphism, as in most Lepidoptera. Female moths of this species tend to be larger than males, appearing bulkier and sporting larger, more robust abdomens. The abdomen of a male Acherotia atropos is less broad, with a pointed distal (lower) abdominal segment. In contrast, the females of the species have a distal abdominal segment that is rounded off at the tip. Antennae seen on a male are thinner and shorter than the antennae seen on a female.

The caterpillar of the African death's-head hawkmoth is also sturdy and somewhat variable in colour, being some shade of buff, green or brown, with seven diagonal blue lines. At the rear is a curved, thornlike horn. It can attain a length of 5 to 6 in (13 to 15 cm). The other two species of death's-head hawkmoth similarly have three larval color forms: typically, green, brown and yellow. The pupa is stout and reddish-brown, and is formed 8 to 10 in (20 to 25 cm) under the ground in a chamber the size of a large hen's egg.

== Behaviour ==
Sound produced by an adult

This species displays a number of behaviours not normally seen in Lepidoptera. Unlike most moths, which generate noise by rubbing external body parts together, all three species within the genus Acherontia are capable of producing a "squeak" from the pharynx, a response triggered by external agitation. The moth sucks in air, causing an internal flap between the mouth and throat to vibrate at a rapid speed. The "squeak" described is produced upon the exhalation when the flap is open. Each cycle of inhalation and exhalation takes approximately one fifth of a second.

It is unclear exactly why the moth emits this sound. One thought is that the squeak may be used to deter potential predators. Due to its unusual method of producing sound, the squeak created by Acherontia atropos is especially startling. Another hypothesis suggests that the squeak relates to the moth's honey bee hive raiding habits. The squeak produced from this moth mimics the piping noise produced from a honey bee hive's queen, a noise in which she utilizes to signal the worker bees to stop moving.

== Etymology ==
Acherontia atropos receives both its species and genus names from bodies relating to death or dark subjects.

The species name atropos relates to death, and is named after the Greek goddess Atropos. Atropos was one of the three Moirai, goddesses of fate and destiny. According to Greek mythology, the three Moirai decide the fate of humans.

The genus name Acherontia is in relation to Acheron, a river located in Epirus, Greece. In mythology, Acheron was thought to be a pathway that lead to the Underworld due to the large, dark gorges it flowed through. In Greek mythology, Acheron is a river in the Underworld, and the name itself occasionally refers directly to the underworld itself.

== Distribution ==
Acherontia atropos occurs throughout the Middle East and the Mediterranean region, much of Africa down to the southern tip, and increasingly as far north as southern Great Britain due to recently mild British winters. It occurs as far east as India and western Saudi Arabia, and as far west as the Canary Islands and Azores. It invades western Eurasia frequently, although few individuals successfully overwinter. Sometimes the young generation appears even above the Arctic Circle, e.g. in northern Sweden (68°12’21.3”N 21°50’18.1”E) on 6 September 2019, after an exceptionally warm summer.

== Development ==
There are several generations of Acherontia atropos per year, with continuous broods in Africa. In the northern parts of its range the species overwinters in the pupal stage. Eggs are laid singly under old leaves of Solanaceae: potato especially, but also Physalis and other nightshades. However it also has been recorded on members of the Verbenaceae, e.g. Lantana, and on members of the families Cannabaceae, Oleaceae, Pedaliaceae and others. The larvae are stout with a posterior horn, as is typical of larvae of the Sphingidae. Most sphingid larvae however, have fairly smooth posterior horns, possibly with a simple curve, either upward or downward. In contrast, Acherontia species and certain relatives bear a posterior horn embossed with round projections about the thicker part. The horn itself bends downwards near the base, but curls upwards towards the tip.

The newly hatched larva starts out light green with yellow stripes diagonally on the sides, but darken after feeding. In the second instar, it has thornlike horns on the back. In the third instar, purple or blue edging develops on the yellow stripes and the tail horn turns from black to yellow. In the final instar, the thorns disappear and the larva may adopt one of three colour morphs: green, brown or yellow. Larvae do not move much, and will click their mandibles or even bite if threatened, though the bite is effectively harmless to human skin. The larva grows to about 120–130 mm, and pupates in an underground chamber. The pupa is smooth and glossy with the proboscis entirely fused to the body, as in most Lepidoptera, though unlike many other sphinx moths.

Life cycle

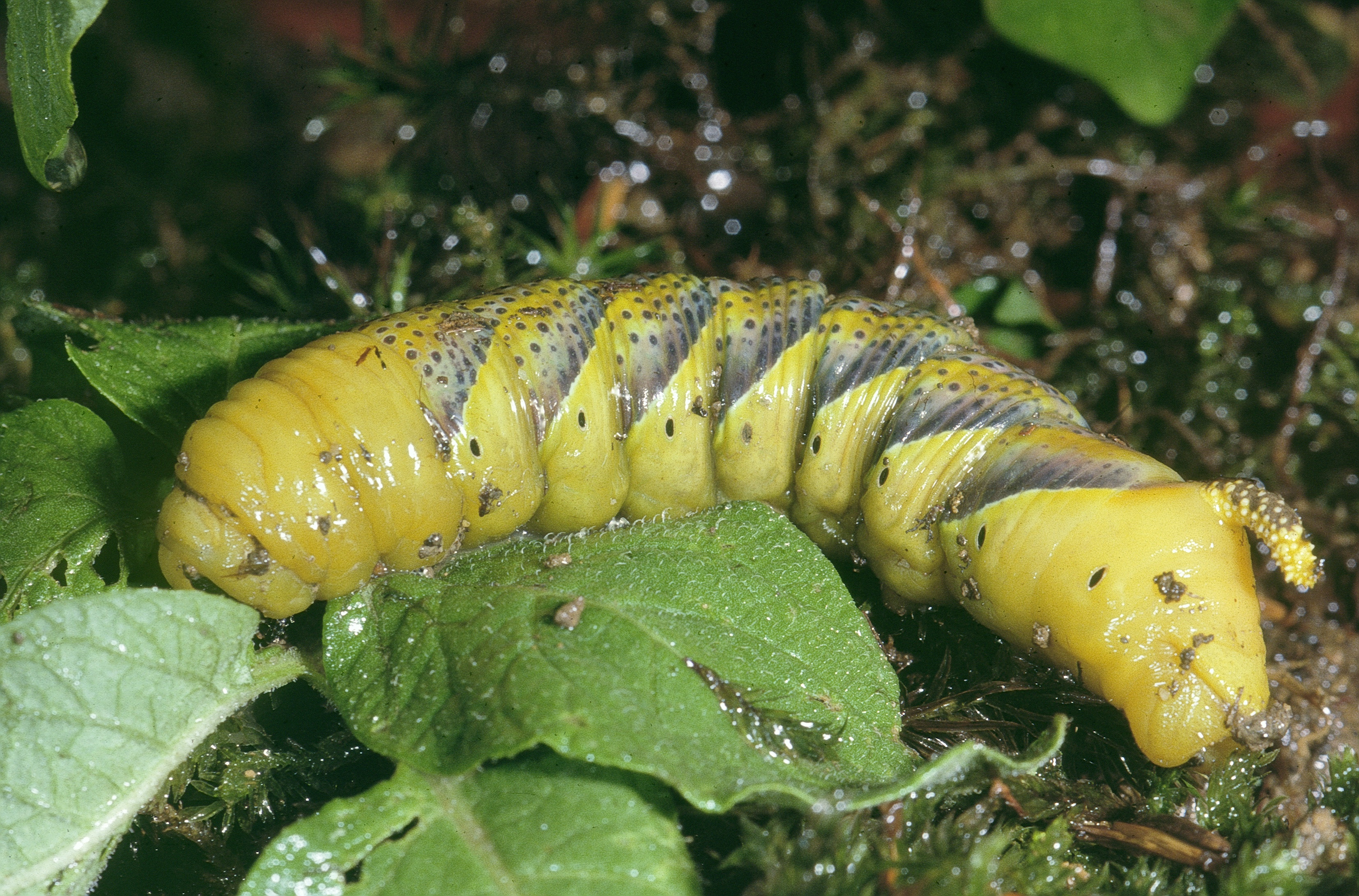
Larva (caterpillar)

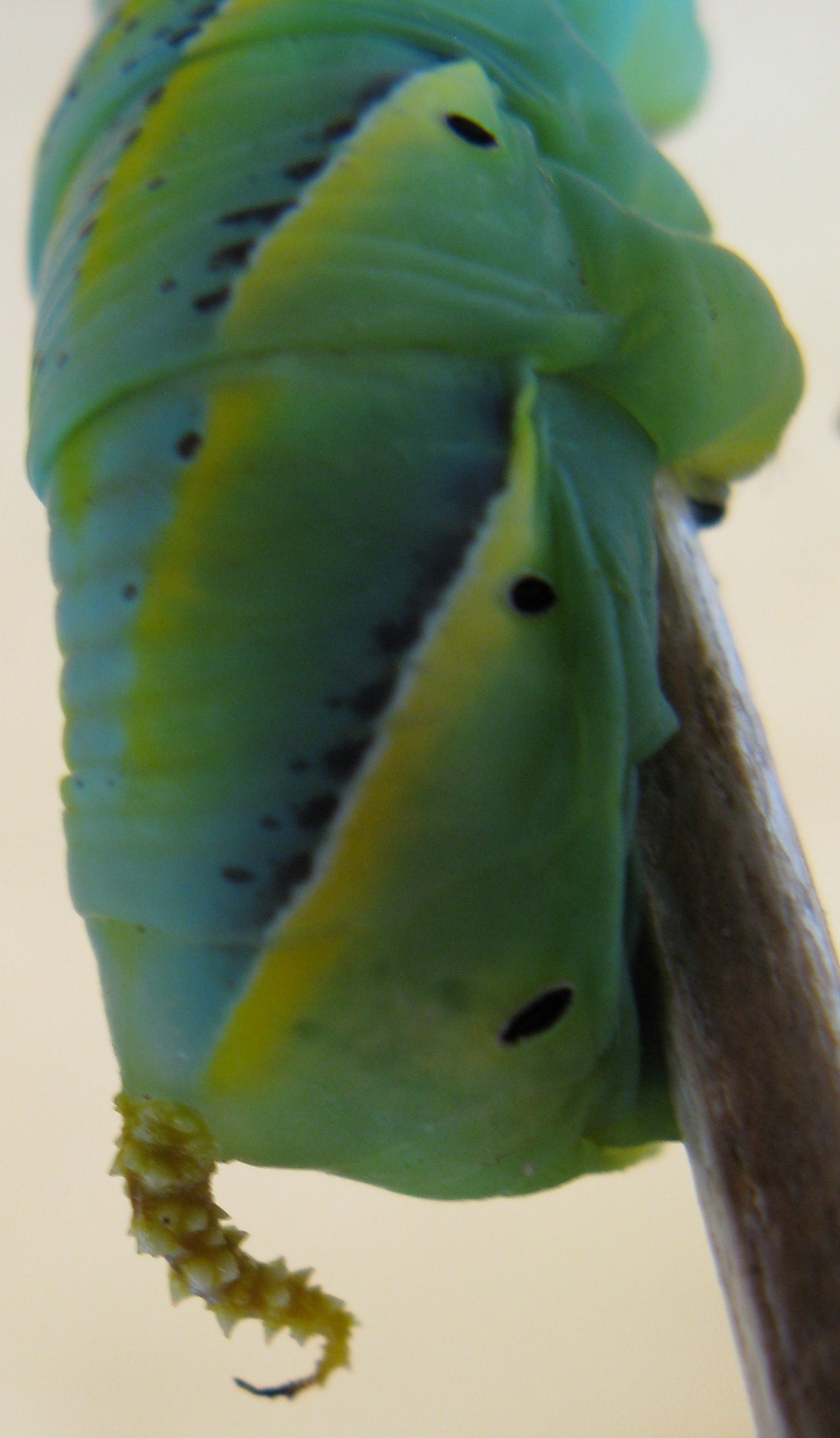
Posterior of mature larva

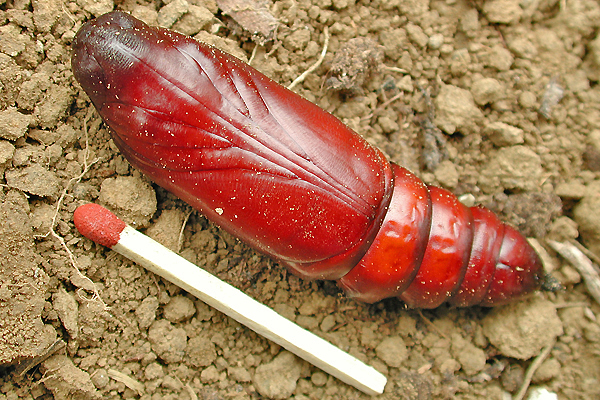
Pupa

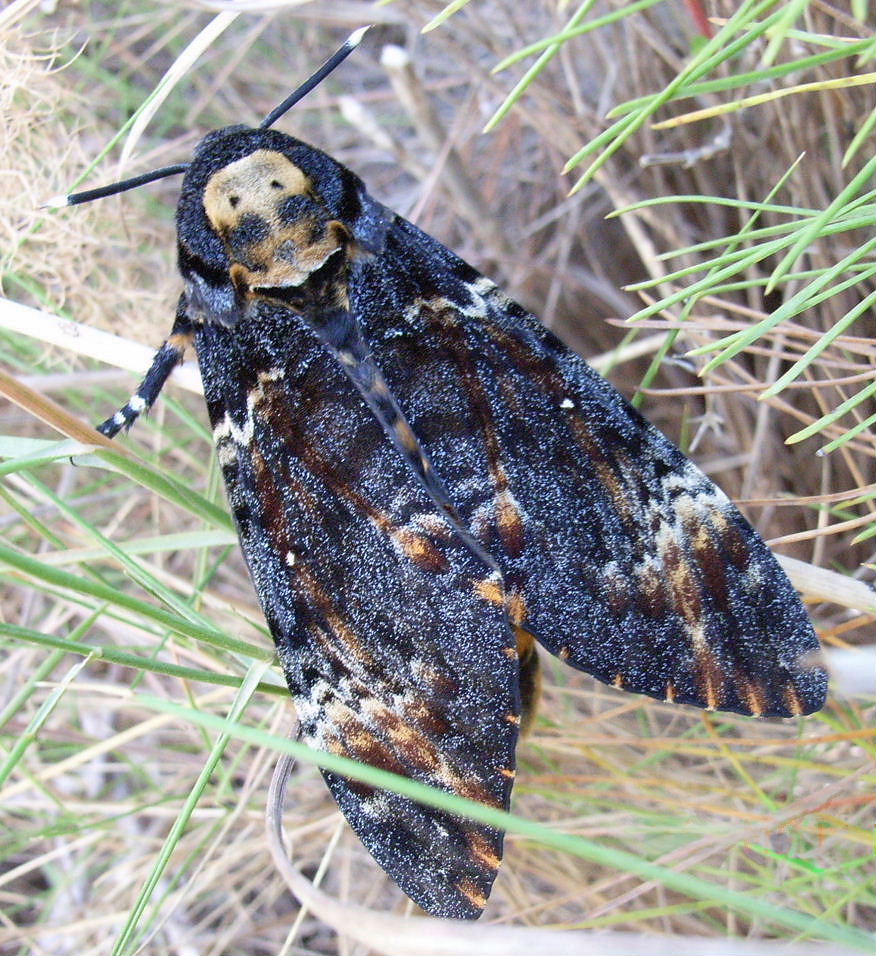
Imago

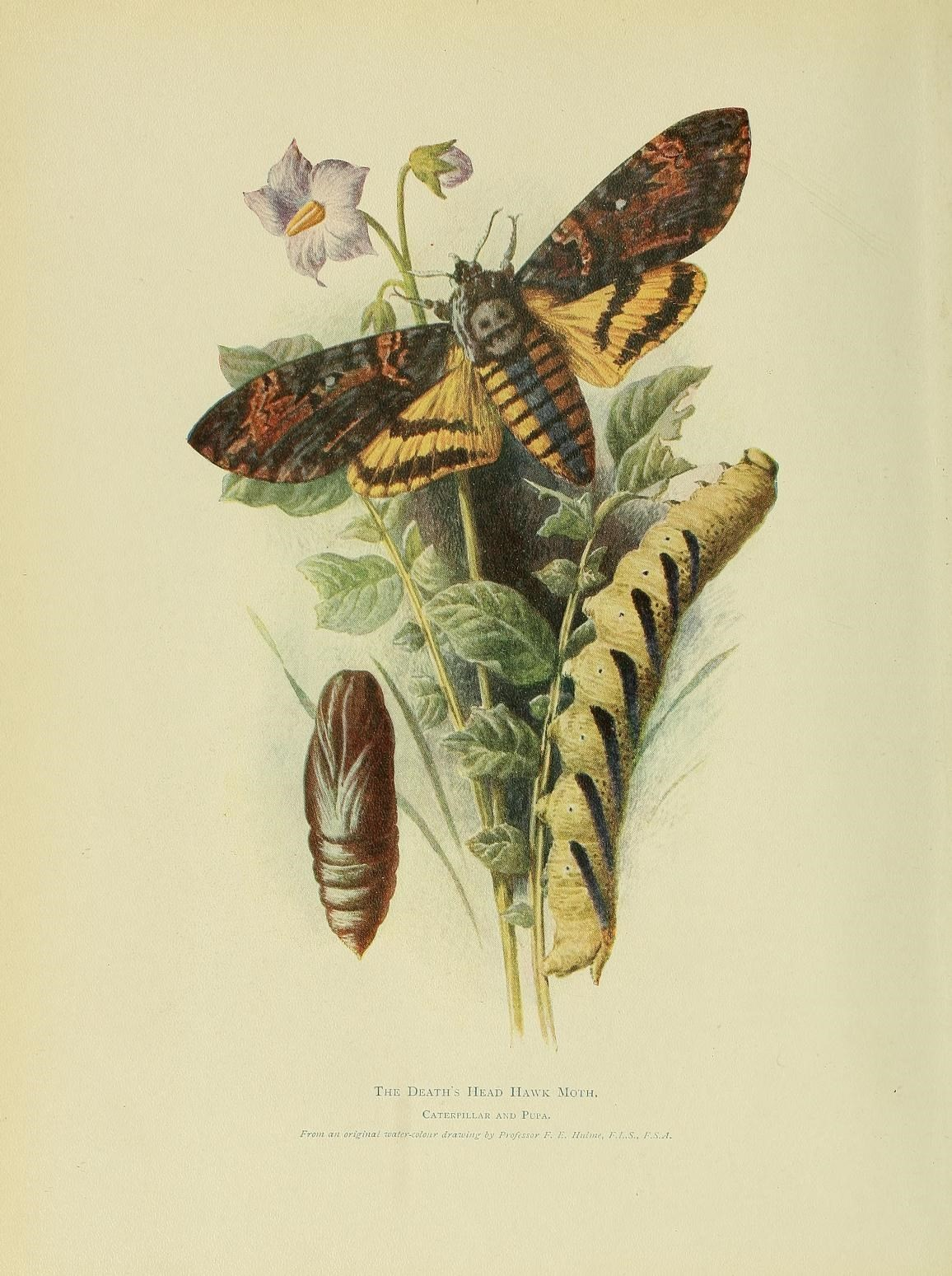
Illustration showing life stages

== Folklore and popular culture ==
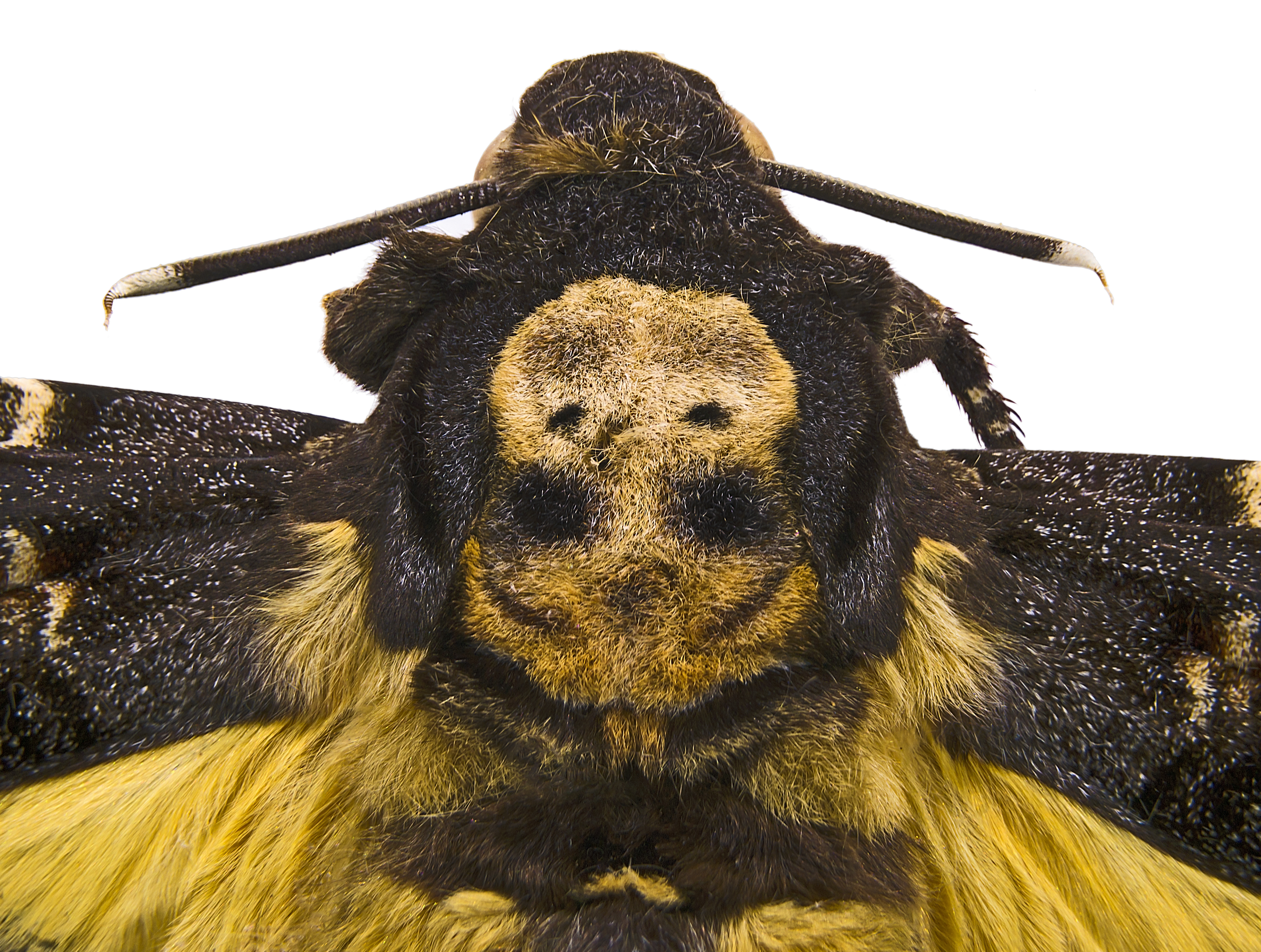
Detail of the Acherontia atropos "skull" marking

In spite of the fact that Acherontia atropos is perfectly harmless except as a minor pest to crops and to beehives, the fancied skull pattern has burdened the moth with a negative reputation, such as associations with the supernatural and evil. There are numerous superstitions to the effect that the moth brings bad luck to the house into which it flies, and that death or misfortune may be expected to follow. More prosaically, in South Africa at least, uninformed people have claimed that the moth has a poisonous, often fatal, sting (possibly referring mainly to the proboscis, but sometimes to the horn on the posterior of the larva).

It appeared in The Hireling Shepherd, in Bram Stoker's Dracula and in films such as Un Chien Andalou and the promotional marquee posters for The Silence of the Lambs. In the latter film, the moth is used as a calling card by the serial killer Buffalo Bill, and though the movie script refers to Acherontia styx, the moths that appear in the film are Acherontia atropos. This moth is referred to in The Mothman Prophecies. It also appears in the music video to Massive Attack's single, "Butterfly Caught".

The death's-head moth is mentioned in Susan Hill's Gothic horror novel I'm the King of the Castle, as it is used to instill fear in one of the young protagonists.

John Keats mentioned the moth as a symbol of death in his "Ode to Melancholy": "Make not your rosary of yew-berries, / Nor let the beetle, nor the death-moth be / Your mournful Psyche".

In José Saramago's novel Death with Interruptions, Acherontia atropos appears on the American edition's cover, and is a topic that two characters mull over.
