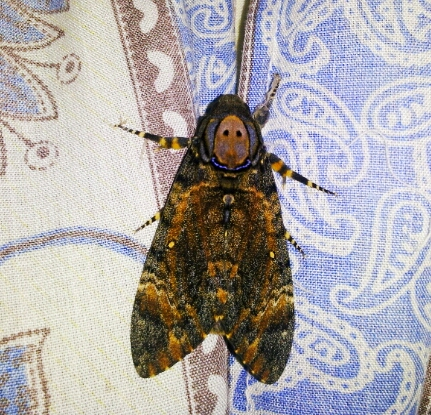

Scientific classification
- Kingdom: Animalia
- Phylum: Arthropoda
- Clade: Pancrustacea
- Class: Insecta
- Order: Lepidoptera
- Family: Sphingidae
- Genus: Acherontia
- Species: A. styx

Binomial name
- Acherontia styx Westwood, 1847

Synonyms
- Acherontia ariel Boisduval, 1875; Acherontia pseudatropos Röber, 1933; Acherontia styx interrupta Closs, 1911; Acherontia styx obsoleta Schmidt, 1914; Acherontia styx crathis Rothschild & Jordan, 1903; Acherontia styx septentrionalis-chinensis Pavlov, 1932

= Acherontia styx =

Species of moth

Acherontia styx, the lesser death's head hawkmoth or bee robber, is a sphingid moth found in Asia, one of the three species of death's-head hawkmoth. It is very fond of honey, and beekeepers have reported finding dead moths in their hives as a result of bee stings. They can mimic the scent of bees so that they can enter a hive unharmed to get honey. Their tongue, which is stout and very strong, enables them to pierce the wax cells of the beehive and suck the honey out. They are also known to be a pest of yuzu (Citrus junos) in South Korea, using their tongue to pierce and damage the fruit.

== Description ==
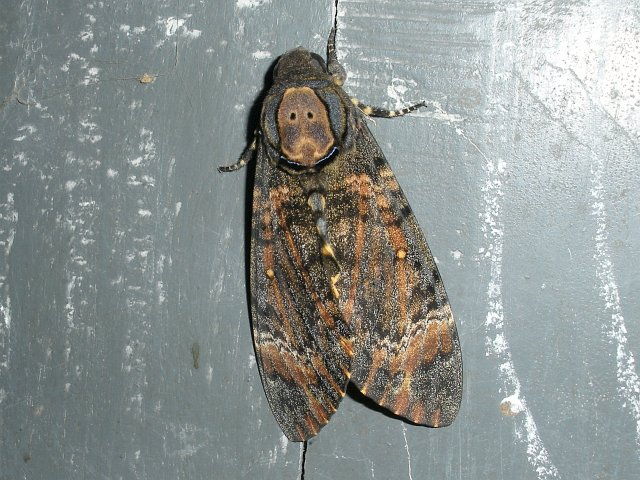

This species is similar to the European A. atropos but differs in having two medial bands on the underside of the forewing, instead of one, and usually no dark bands across the ventral surface of the abdomen. The skull-like marking is darker and there is a faint blue tornal dot enclosed by a black submarginal band on the hindwing upperside. The forewing discal spot (stigma) is orange; in A. atropos it is usually white.

There are two described subspecies, A. s. styx and A. s. medusa Moore, 1858, but they intergrade widely, and authorities presently consider that A. s. medusa is just a wet zone/season form and not taxonomically distinct.

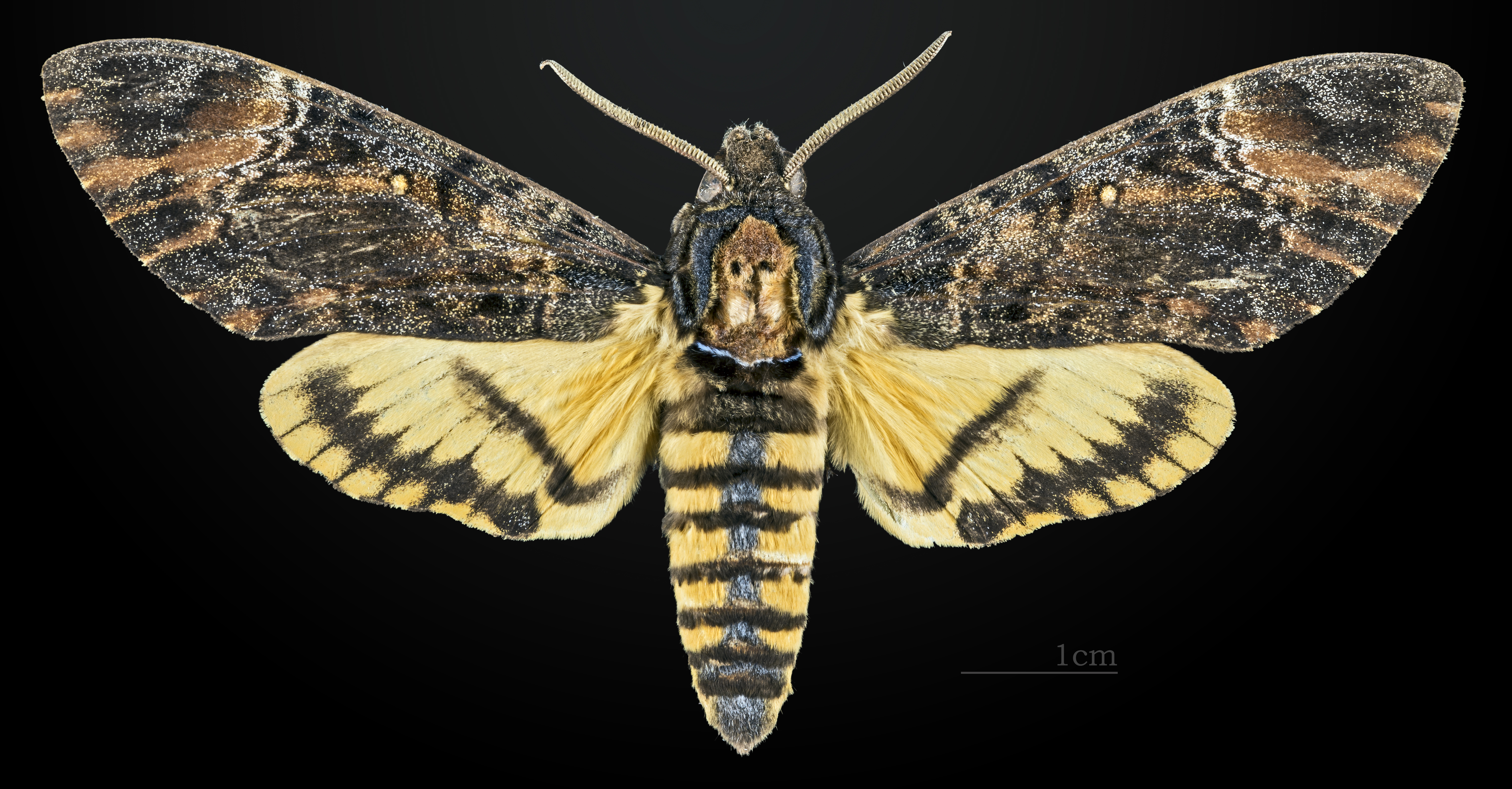
A. s. styx male

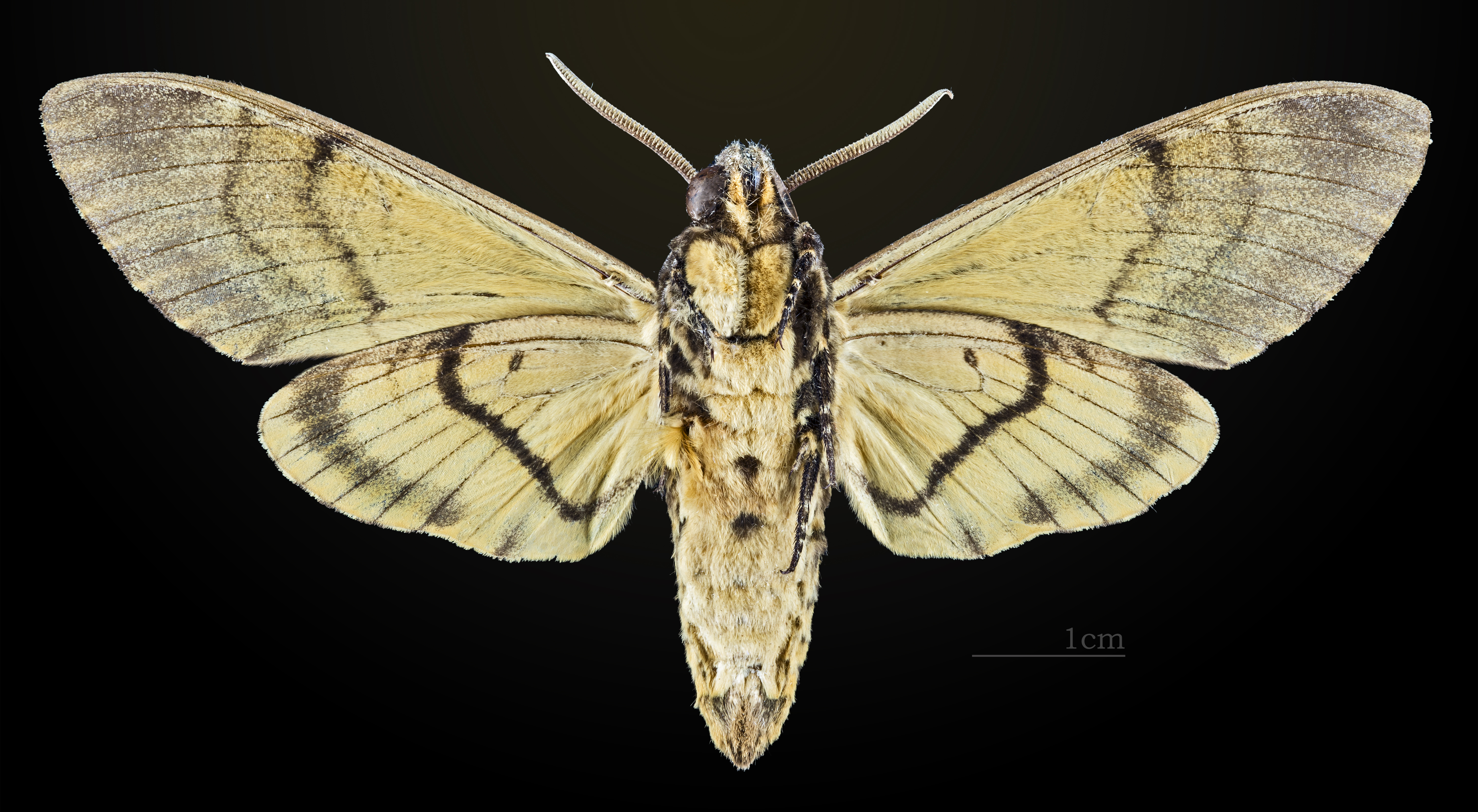
A. s. styx male underside

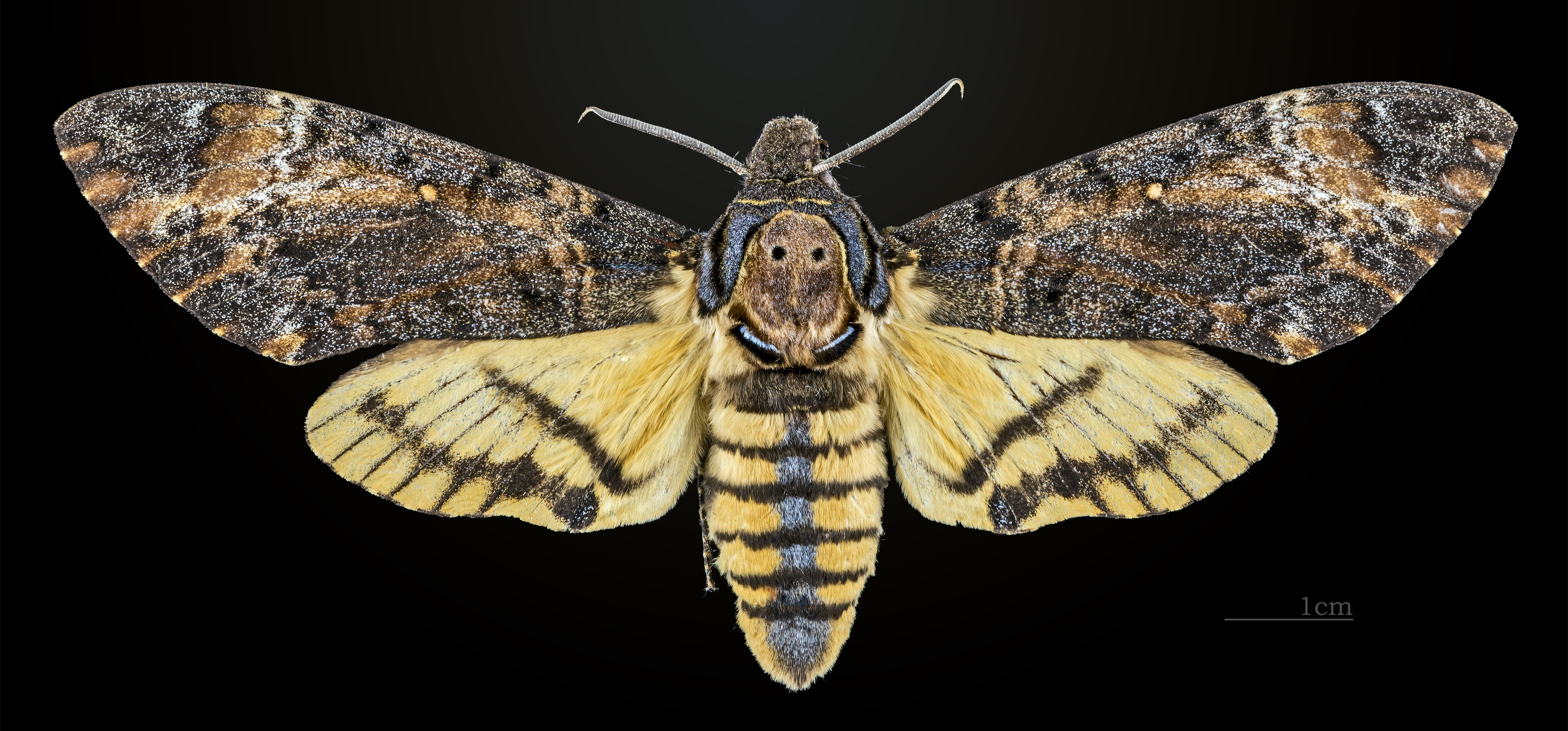
A. s. styx female

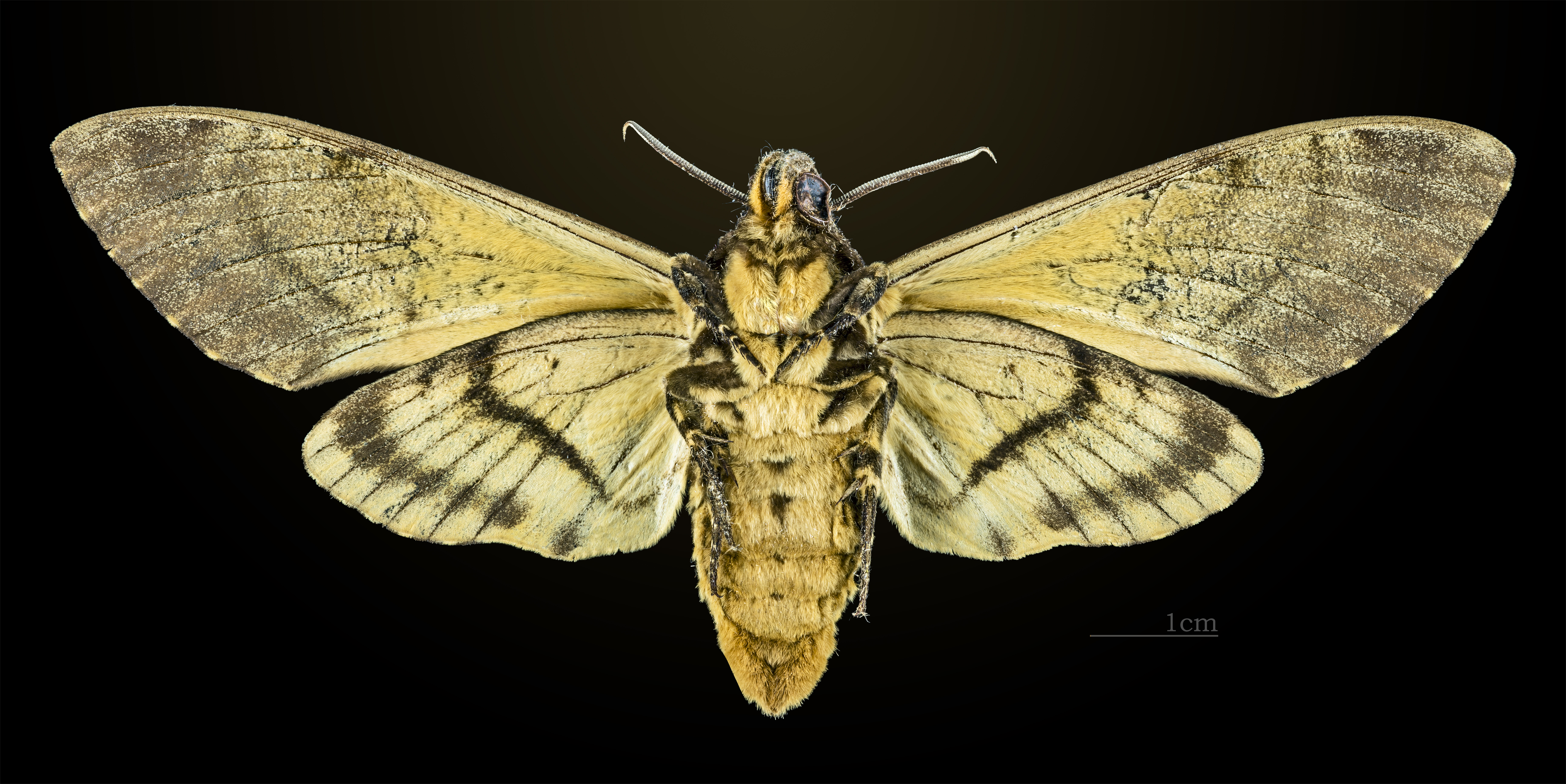
A. s. styx female underside
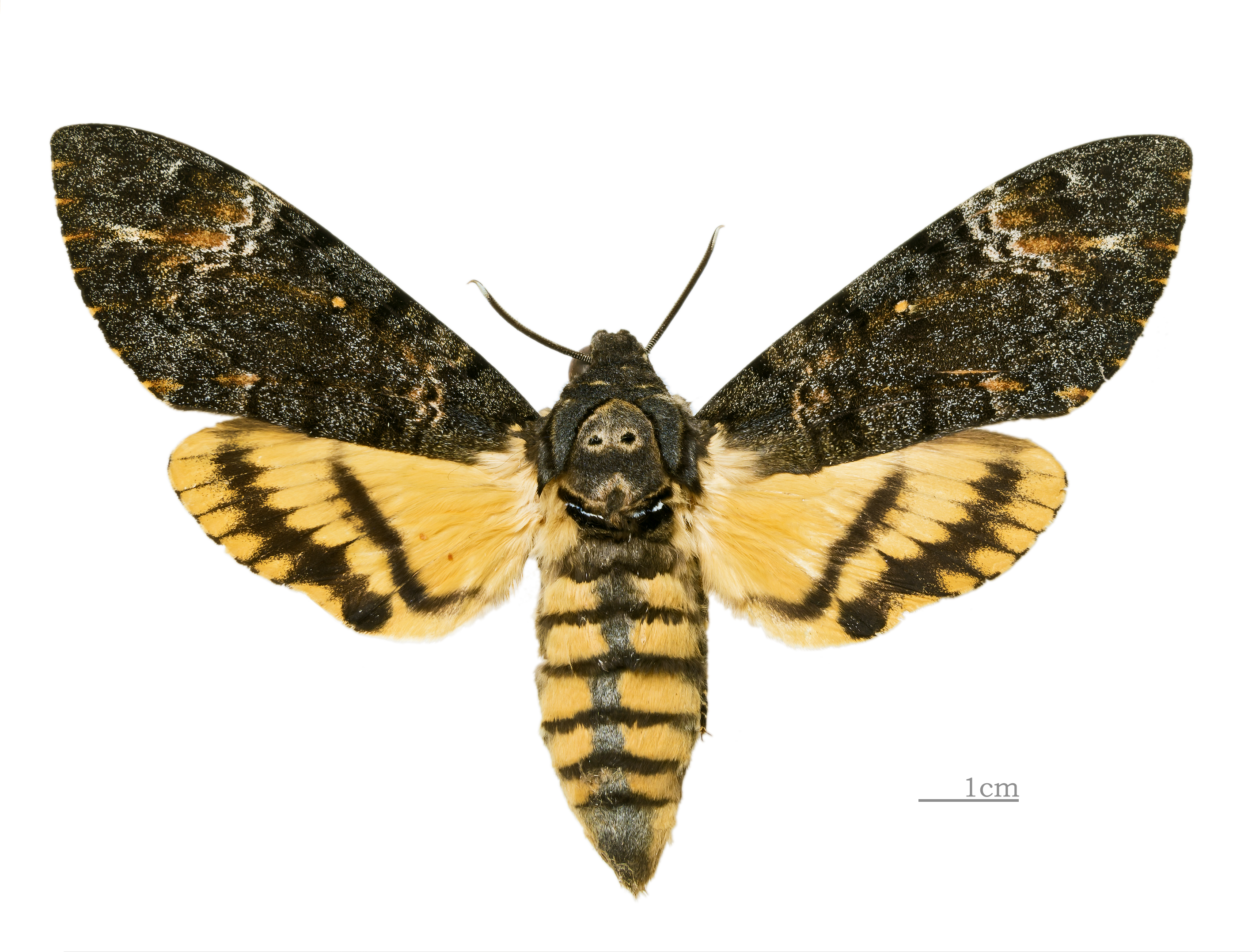
A. s. medusa dorsal side

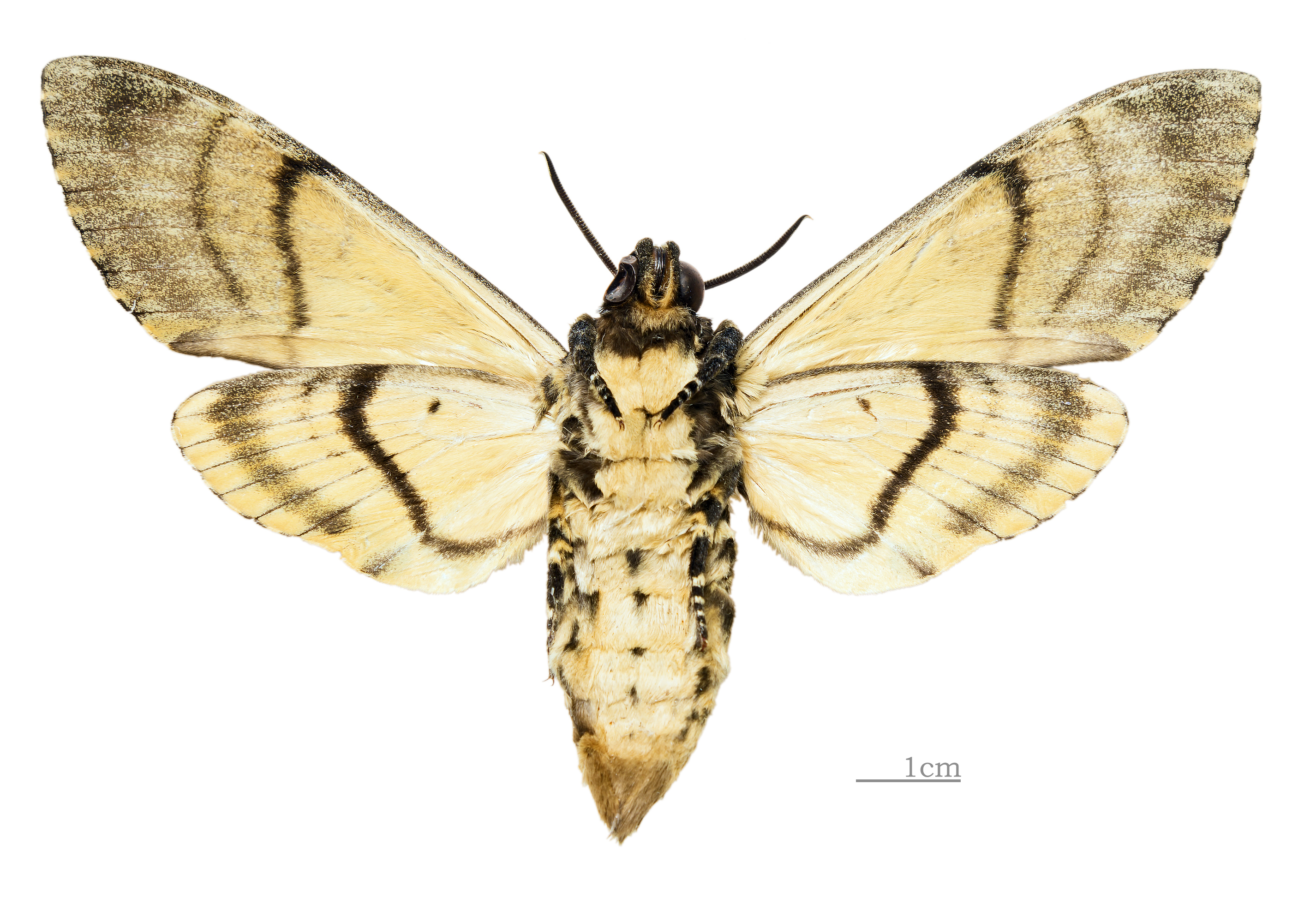
A. s. medusa underside

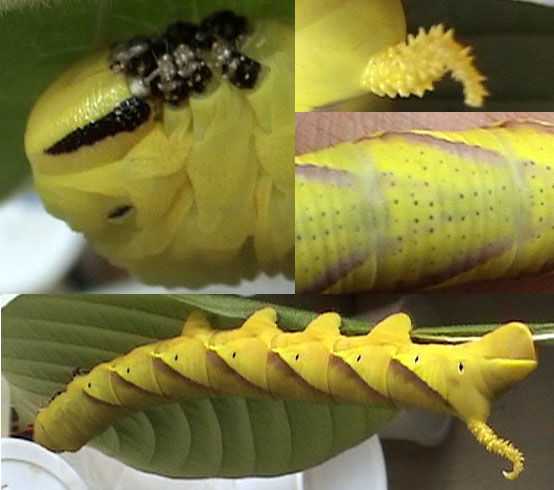
Caterpillar

In, The Fauna of British India, Including Ceylon and Burma: Moths Volume I, the species is described as follows.

Head brown; thorax dark blue-grey, with black lateral lines which meet behind; the center of the thorax occupied by a fulvous skull-mark with two black eyes; abdomen yellow, with blackish segmental bands and a blue-grey stripe down the vertex. Fore wing mottled with various shades of brown, fulvous and grey; three indistinct antemedial lines; a pale spot in the end of cell; two lunulate curved postmedial lines. Hind wing yellow with a postmedial black band not reaching the costa or anal angle; a similar submarginal maculate band. Differes from A. atropos in having two medial bands on the underside of the fore wing instead of one, and no bands on the underside of abdomen. Larva green, with oblique lateral yellow streaks on somites 4-10.

— The Fauna of British India, Including Ceylon and Burma: Moths Volume I.

== Development ==
Eggs are laid primarily on Bignoniaceae, Fabaceae, Oleaceae, Pedaliaceae, Solanaceae and Verbenaceae. In India the larvae sometimes occur in such numbers as to cause serious damage to crops such as Sesamum indicum. Mature larvae can be 120 mm long, and come in green, yellow or brown color forms. Larvae closely resemble those of A. atropos except that the dark blue dorsal speckling is more pronounced on the anterior half of each abdominal segment, and the tail horn is less curved and lacks a reflexed tip. Pupation occurs in an underground chamber, excavated less than 10 cm below the surface of the soil.

== Distribution ==
The variant referred to as A. styx medusa occurs throughout eastern continental Asia, from northeastern China (where it is a migrant) and Japan, south through eastern China and Vietnam to Peninsular Malaysia and peninsular Thailand. It is also found throughout the islands of the Malay Archipelago. A. s. styx occurs from north-central and western China westward across northern Thailand, Myanmar, Bangladesh, India, Sri Lanka, Nepal, Pakistan and Iran to Saudi Arabia, Iraq, Jordan and Israel.
