= Sphinx fasciatus =

Sphinx fasciatus can be:

- Sphinx fasciatus Sulzer, 1776, the protonym and a synonym for Eumorpha fasciatus (Sulzer, 1776)
- Sphinx fasciatus Rothschild, 1894, a synonym for Agrius rothschildi Kitching & Cadiou, 2000
