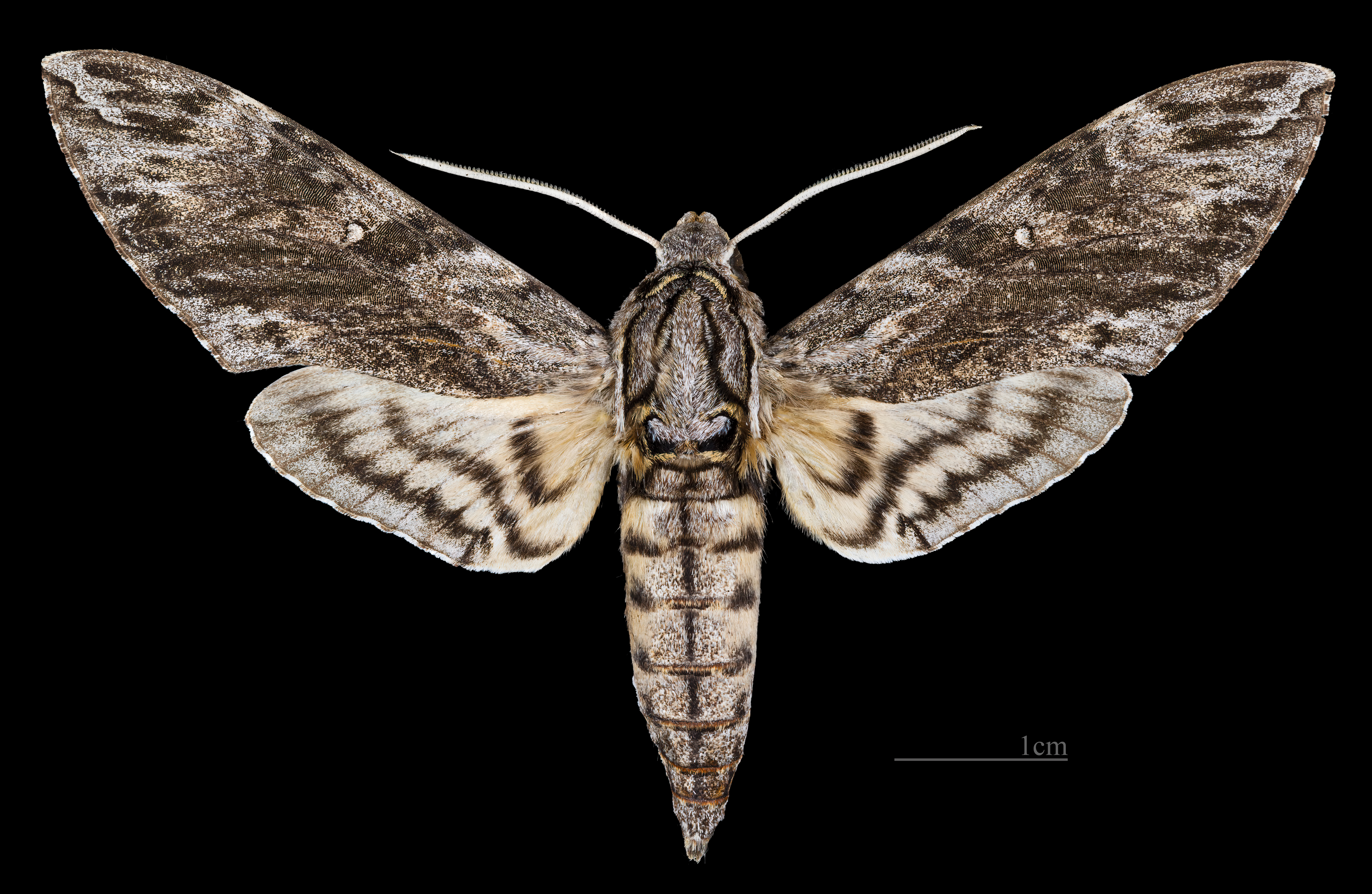
- Agrius godarti ♂
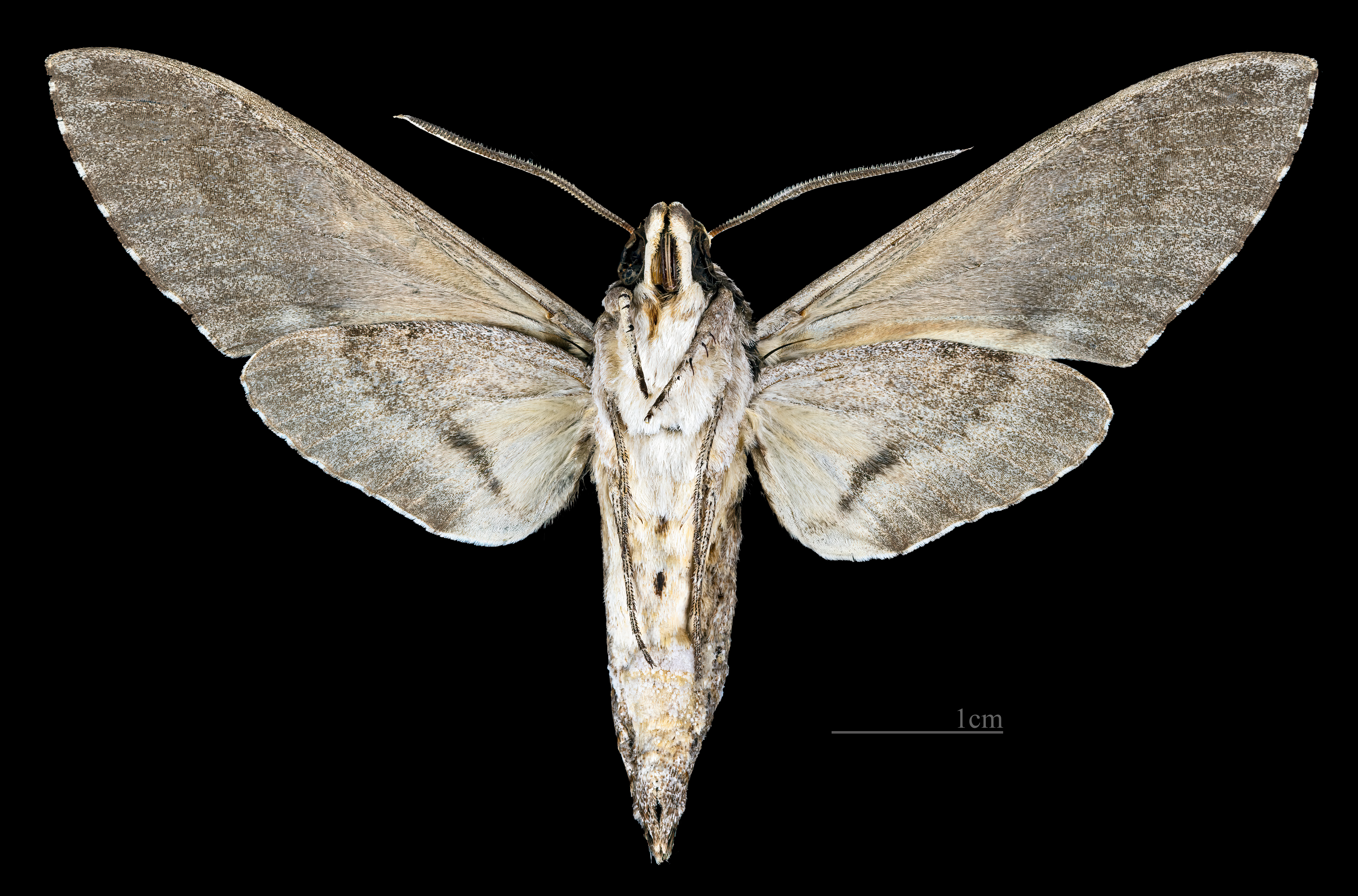
- Agrius godarti ♂ △

Scientific classification
- Kingdom: Animalia
- Phylum: Arthropoda
- Clade: Pancrustacea
- Class: Insecta
- Order: Lepidoptera
- Family: Sphingidae
- Genus: Agrius
- Species: A. godarti

Binomial name
- Agrius godarti (W.S.Macleay, 1826)

Synonyms
- Sphinx godarti W.S. Macleay, 1826; Sphinx distincta Lucas, 1891

= Agrius godarti =

Species of moth

Agrius godarti is a moth in the family Sphingidae which is found inland in the northern half of Australia, including Queensland and New South Wales.

They have a wingspan of about 80 mm. It is similar to Agrius convolvuli, but there is slight sexual dimorphism (the forewing of the female is paler than that of the male), the lateral abdominal spots are buff (not pink) and the hindwing upperside pale bands are buff (not grey). The median band is single and narrow.
