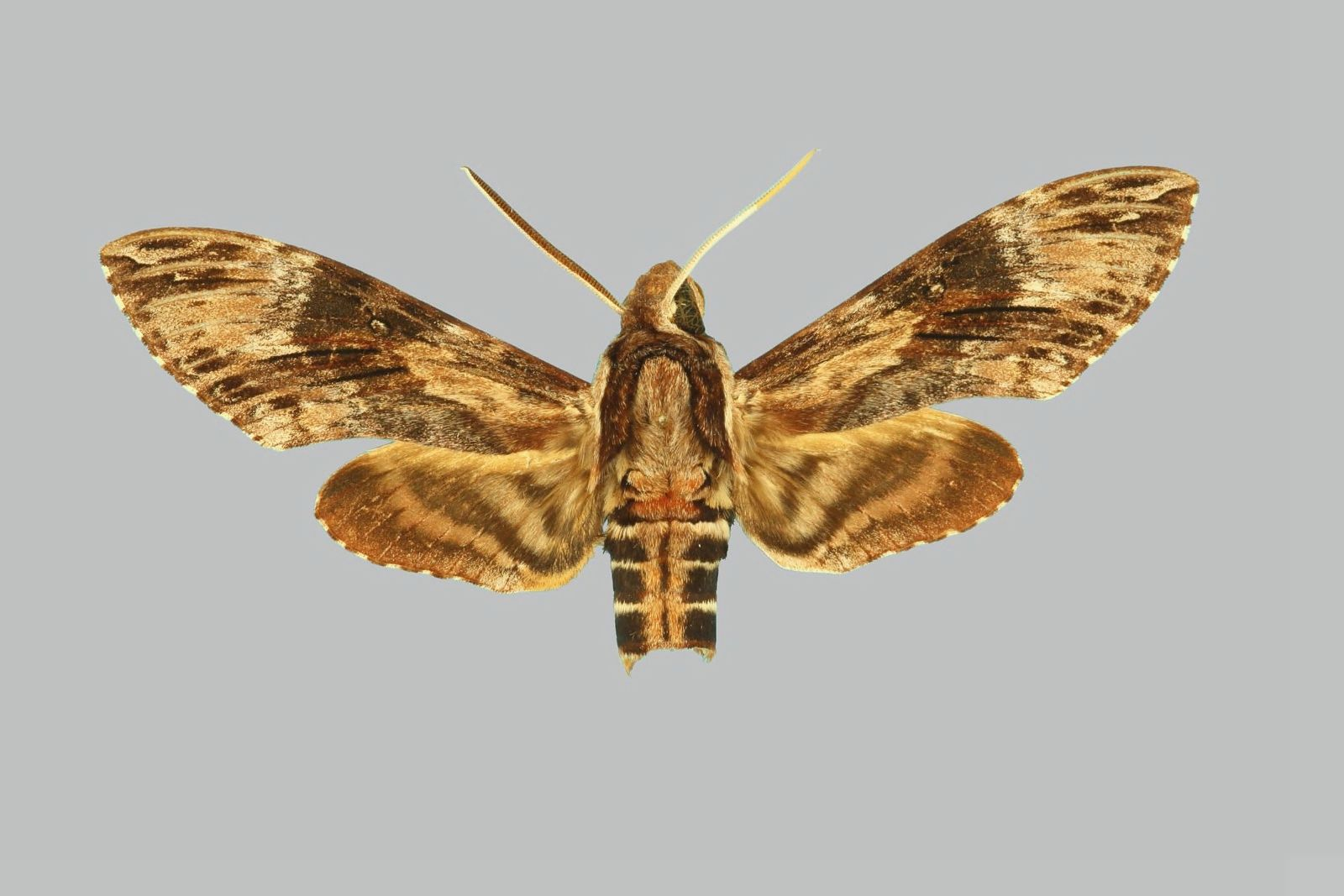

Scientific classification
- Kingdom: Animalia
- Phylum: Arthropoda
- Clade: Pancrustacea
- Class: Insecta
- Order: Lepidoptera
- Family: Sphingidae
- Genus: Agrius
- Species: A. rothschildi

Binomial name
- Agrius rothschildi Kitching & Cadiou, 2000

Synonyms
- Sphinx fasciatus Rothschild, 1894

= Agrius rothschildi =

Species of moth

Agrius rothschildi is a moth of the family Sphingidae. It is known from New Caledonia. Agrius rothschildi is a replacement name for Sphinx fasciatus.

It is similar to Agrius luctifera but the wings and body have a vinaceous tint and the mesonotal yellow spots are absent. The black dorsal line on the abdomen is sharply marked.
