= Agrius cordiae =

Scientific classification
- Domain: Eukaryota
- Kingdom: Animalia
- Phylum: Arthropoda
- Class: Insecta
- Order: Lepidoptera
- Family: Sphingidae
- Genus: Agrius
- Species: A. cordiae

Binomial name
- Agrius cordiae Riotte, 1984

Species of moth

Agrius cordiae is a moth of the family Sphingidae. It is known from the Marshall Islands.
