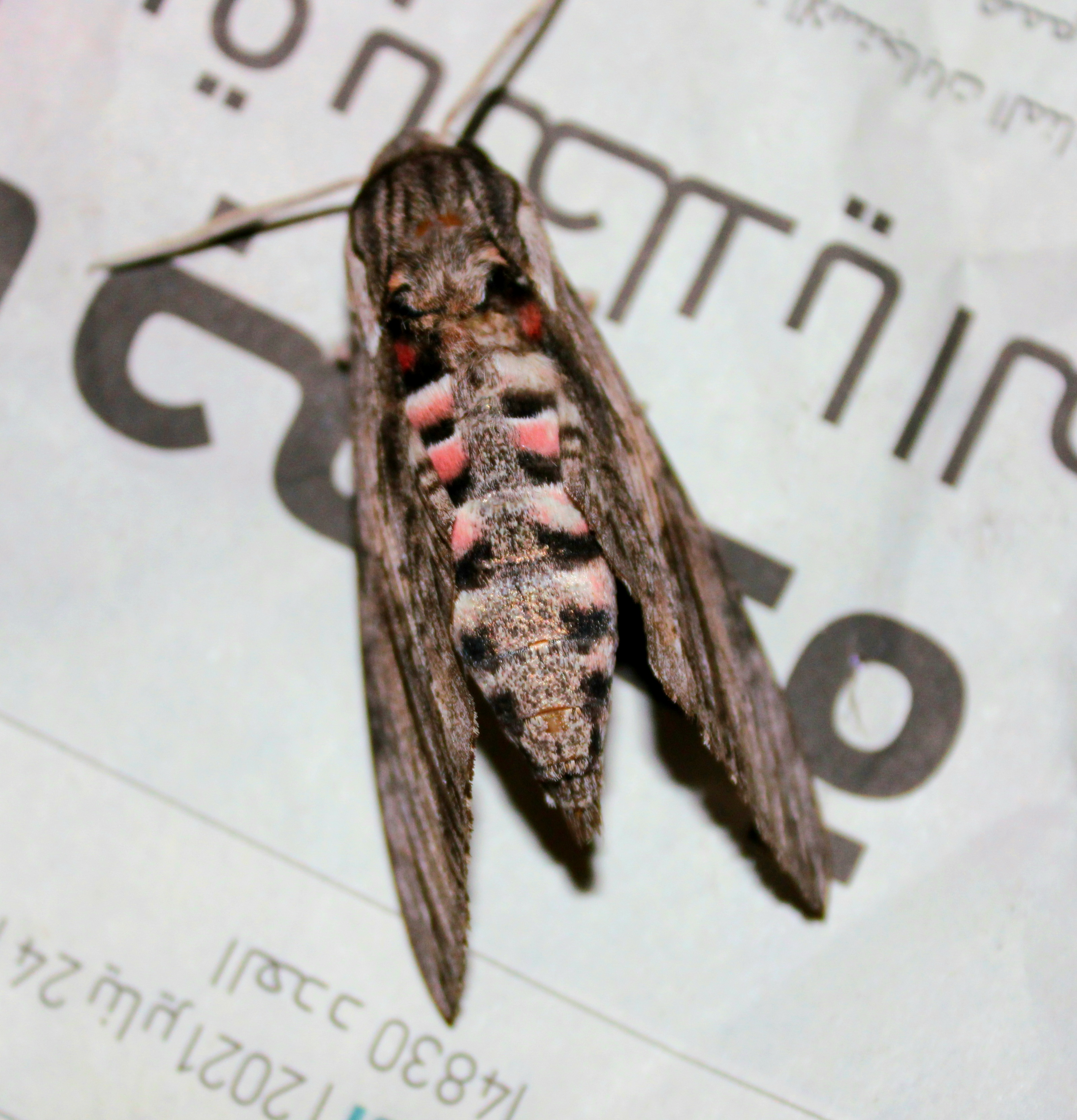

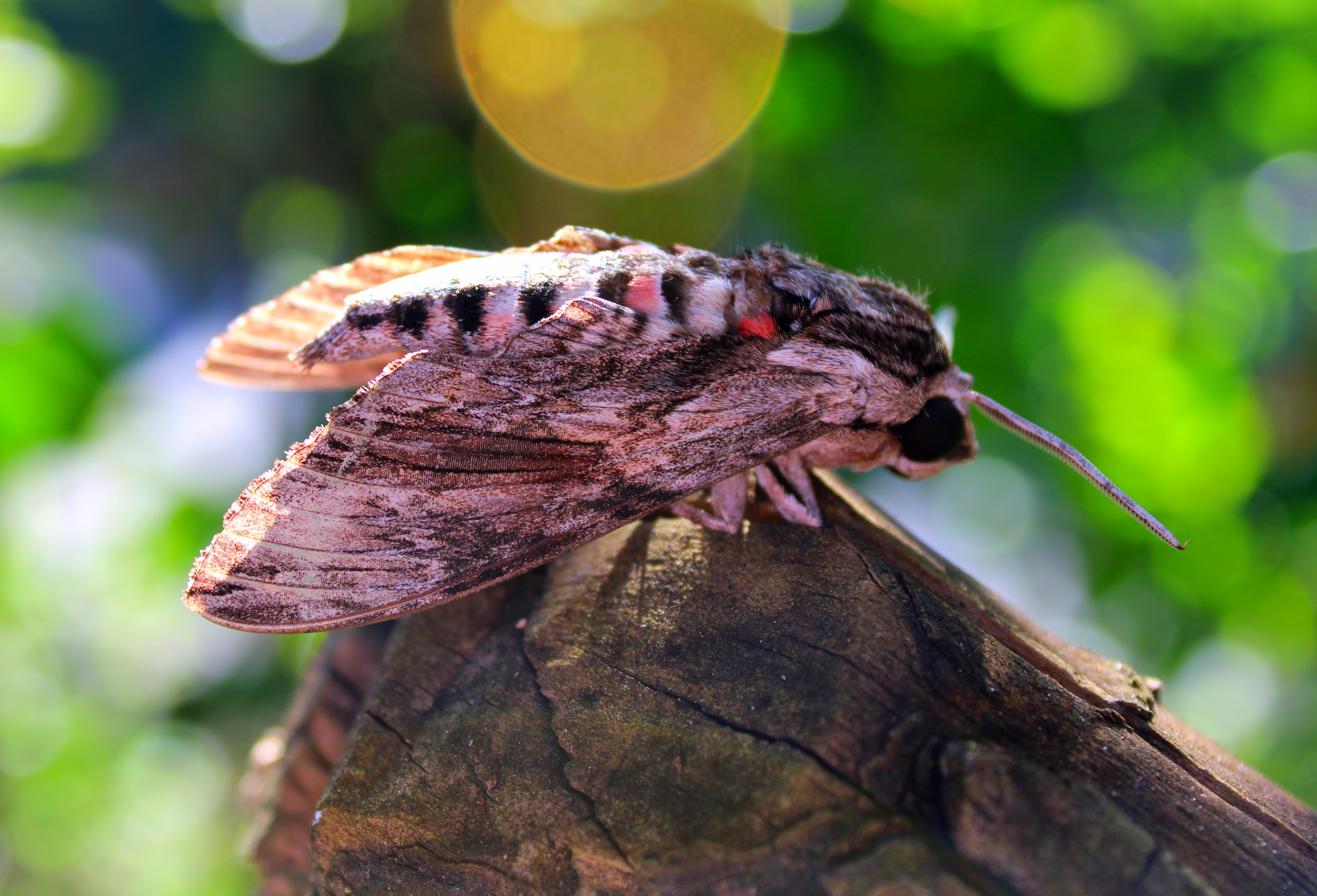

Scientific classification
- Kingdom: Animalia
- Phylum: Arthropoda
- Clade: Pancrustacea
- Class: Insecta
- Order: Lepidoptera
- Family: Sphingidae
- Genus: Agrius
- Species: A. convolvuli

Binomial name
- Agrius convolvuli (Linnaeus, 1758)
- Distribution (red – permanent; orange – migrant)

Synonyms
- Sphinx convolvuli Linnaeus, 1758; Herse convolvuli; Protoparce orientalis Butler, 1876; Sphinx abadonna Fabricius, 1798; Sphinx distans Butler, 1876; Sphinx patatas Ménétriés, 1857; Sphinx pseudoconvolvuli Schaufuss, 1870; Sphinx roseafasciata Koch, 1865; Sphinx convolvuli alicea Neuburger, 1899; Sphinx convolvuli batatae Christ, 1882; Sphinx convolvuli nigricans Cannaviello, 1900; Agrius convolvuli aksuensis O. Bang-Haas, 1927; Agrius convolvuli fuscosignata Tutt, 1904; Agrius convolvuli grisea Tutt, 1904; Agrius convolvuli ichangensis Tutt, 1904; Agrius convolvuli intermedia Tutt, 1904; Agrius convolvuli javanensis Tutt, 1904; Agrius convolvuli major Tutt, 1904; Agrius convolvuli minor Tutt, 1904; Agrius convolvuli obscura Tutt, 1904; Agrius convolvuli suffusa Tutt, 1904; Agrius convolvuli tahitiensis Tutt, 1904; Agrius convolvuli unicolor Tutt, 1904; Agrius convolvuli variegata Tutt, 1904; Agrius convolvuli virgata Tutt, 1904; Herse convolvuli extincta Gehlen, 1928; Herse convolvuli marshallensis Clark, 1922; Herse convolvuli peitaihoensis Clark, 1922; Herse convolvuli posticoconflua Bryk, 1946; Protoparce convolvuli fasciata Pillich, 1909; Protoparce convolvuli indica Skell, 1913

= Agrius convolvuli =

Species of moth

Agrius convolvuli, the convolvulus hawk-moth, is a large hawk-moth. It is common throughout Europe, Asia, Africa, Australia and New Zealand, partly as a migrant. In New Zealand, it is also known as the kumara moth, and in the Māori language as hīhue.

== Description and habits ==
The wingspan is 80–105 millimetres (3.1–4.1 in). This hawkmoth's basic coloration is in grayish tones, but the abdomen has a broad gray dorsal stripe and pink and black bands edged with white on the sides. The hindwings are light gray with darker broad crosslines. Males have more heavier markings than the female and sometimes has a broad central cross band.

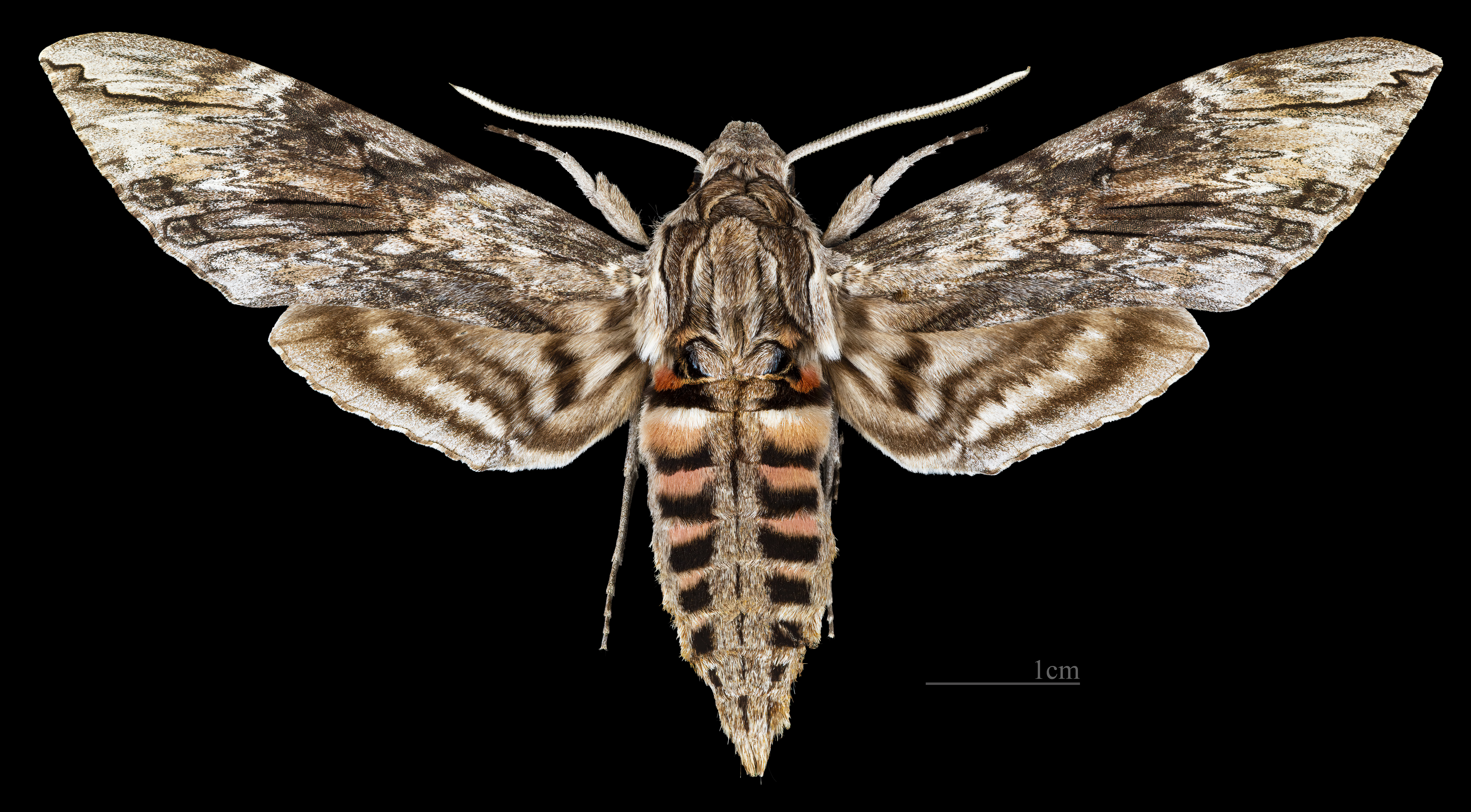
♂

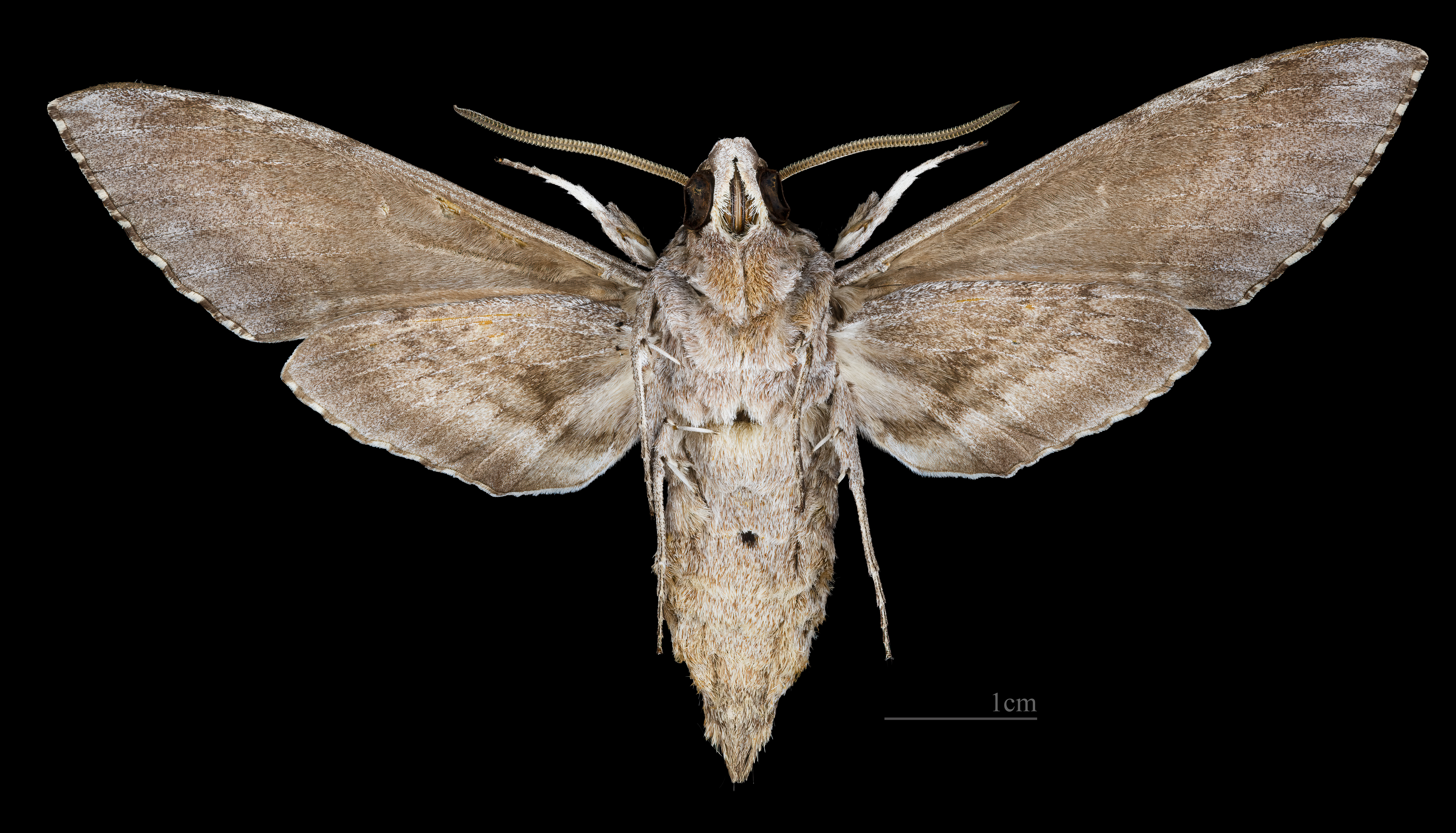
♂ △

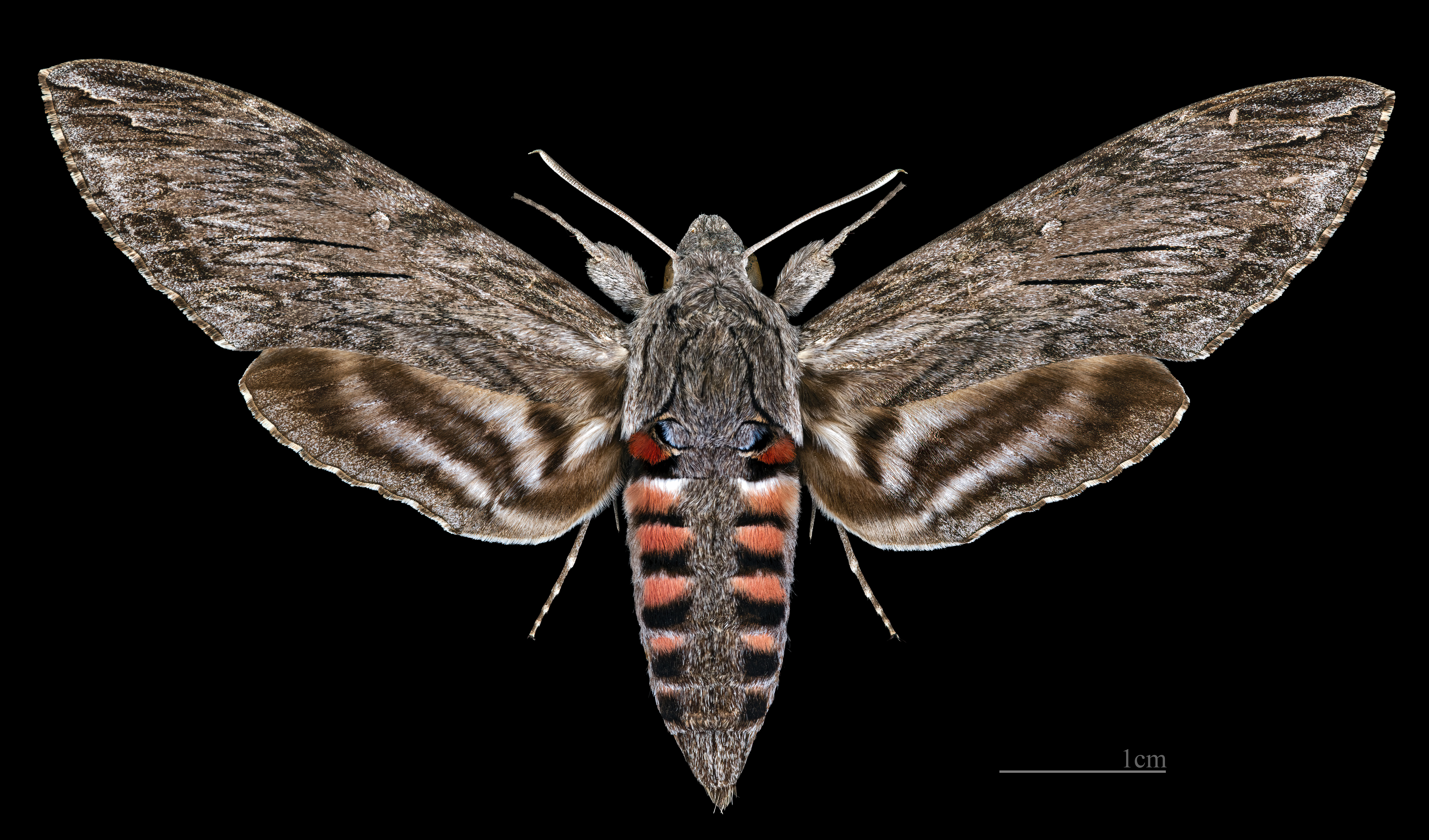
♀

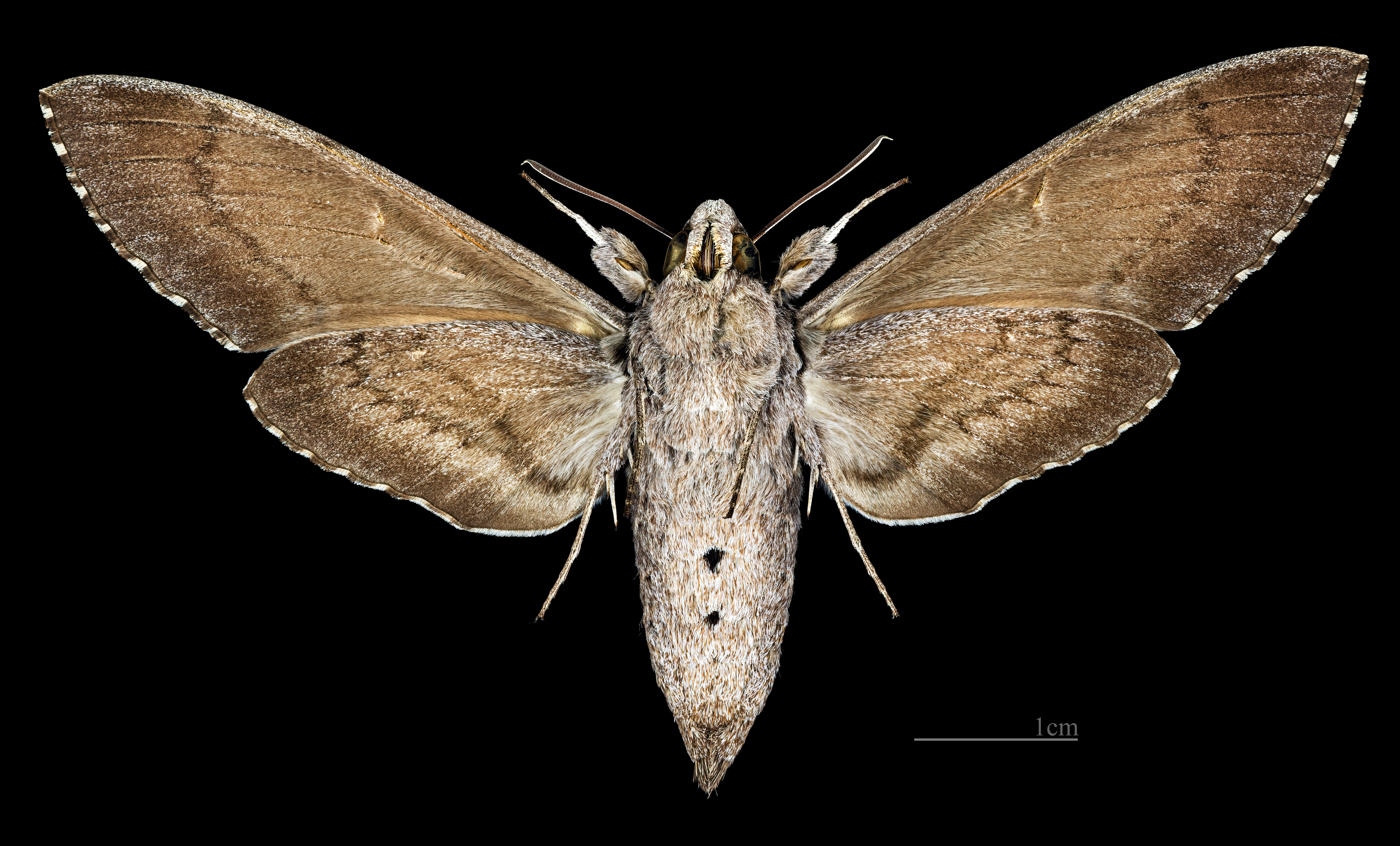
♀ △

Its favourite time is around sunset and during the twilight, when it is seen in gardens hovering over the flowers. This moth is very attracted to light, so it is often killed by cars on highways. Its caterpillars eat the leaves of the Convolvulus, hence its Latin name "convolvuli". Other recorded food plants include a wide range of plants in the families Araceae, Convolvulaceae, Leguminosae and Malvaceae. It can be a pest of cultivated Ipomoea batatas (sweet potato or kūmara) in New Zealand and the Pacific. The adult feeds on the wing and has a very long proboscis (longer than its body) that enables it to feed on long trumpet-like flowers such as Nicotiana sylvestris, Petunioideae, and Liliaceae.

The caterpillars can be in a number of different colours. As well as brown (pictured below) they have been seen in bright green and black.

== Similar species ==
A. convolvuli is unmistakable in the eastern area of distribution, in the western area of distribution it can be mistaken for Agrius cingulata. This species, found mainly in South and Central America, is repeatedly detected on the western shores of Europe. Agrius cingulata can be distinguished on the basis of the clearly stronger pink colouring of the abdominal segments and a similarly coloured rear wing base. In addition, Agrius convolvuli form pseudoconvolvuli Schaufuss, 1870 has some resemblance with North American species in the genus Manduca, for instance Manduca sexta.

== Gallery ==
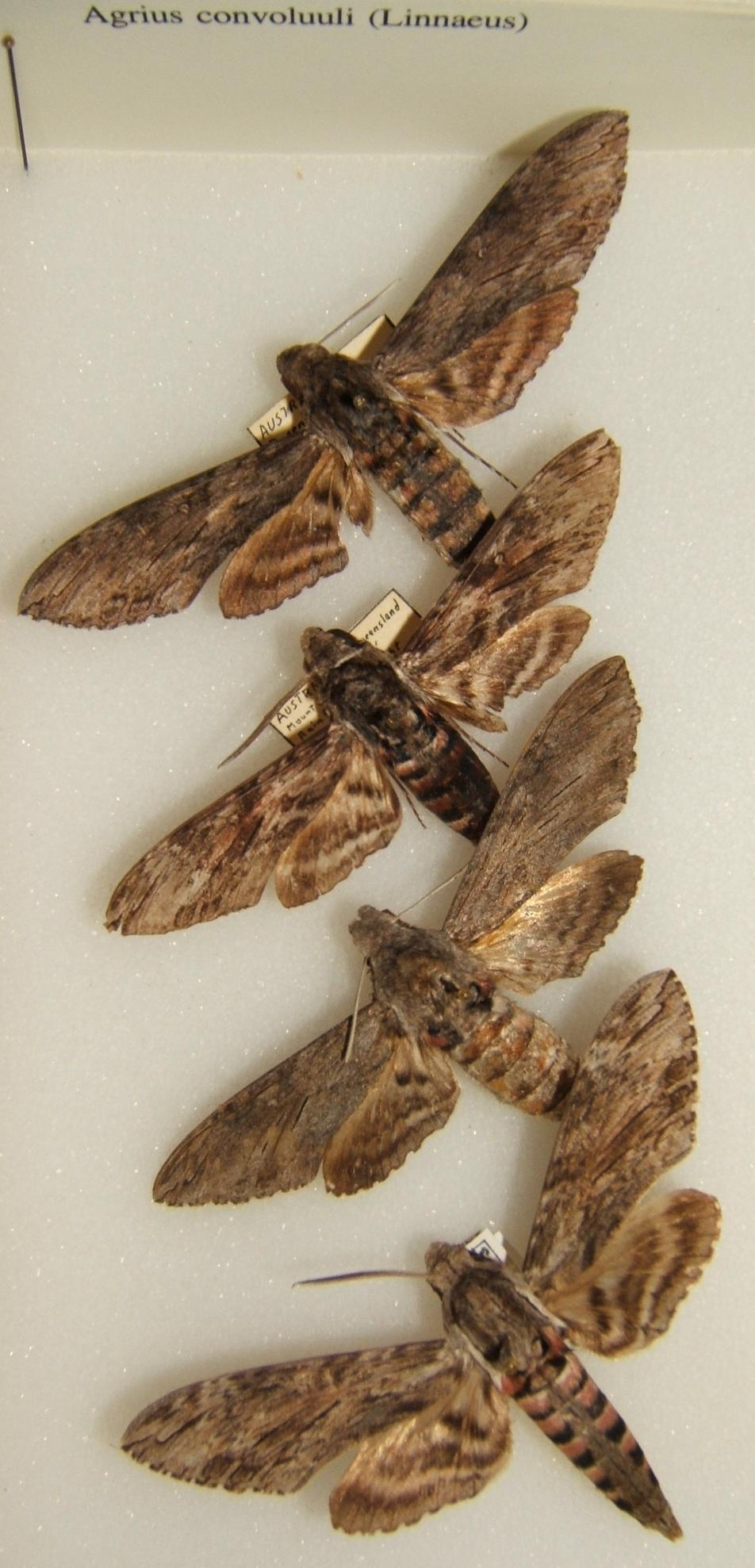
Agrius convoluli variation

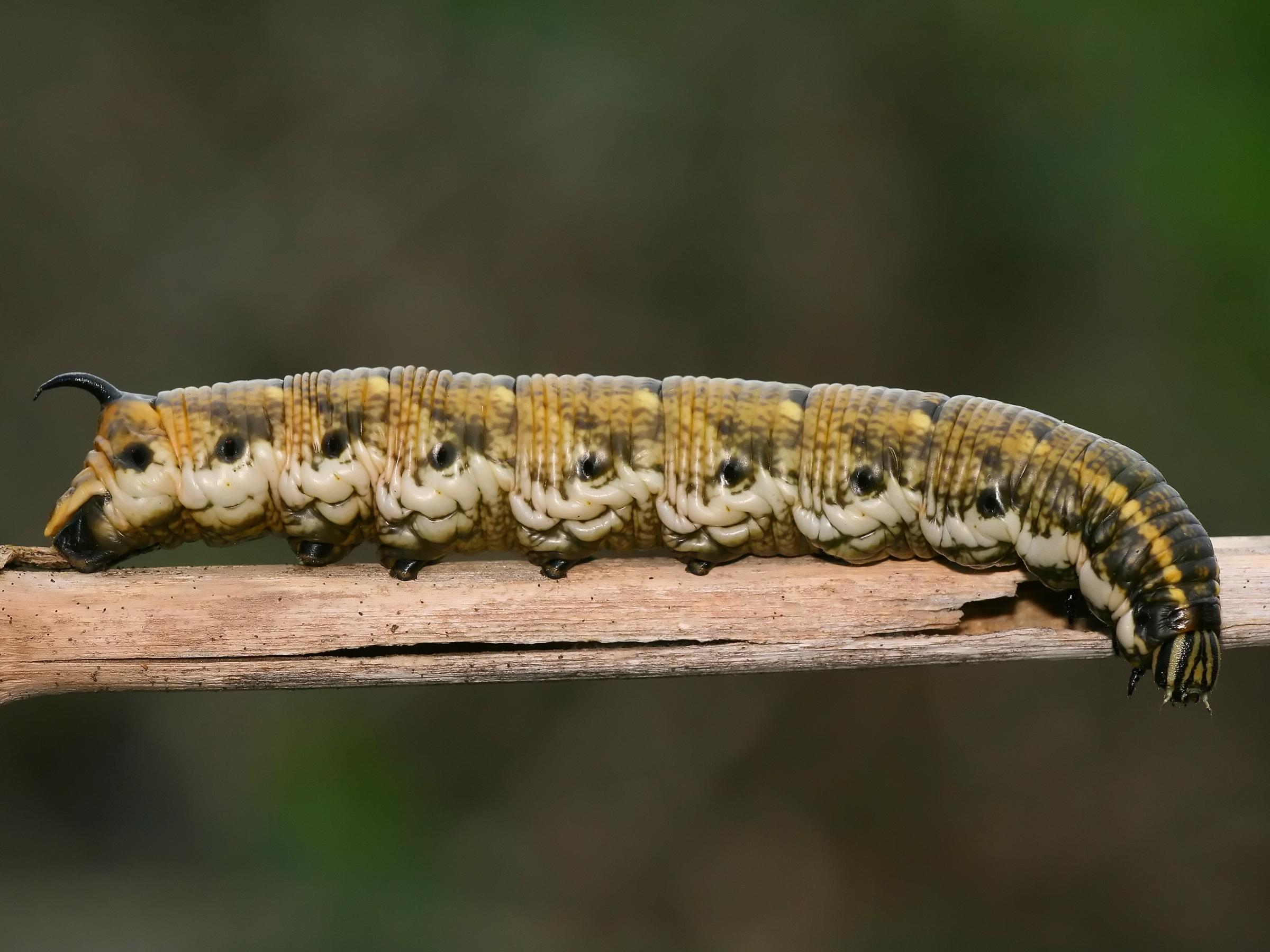
Larva of Agrius convolvuli

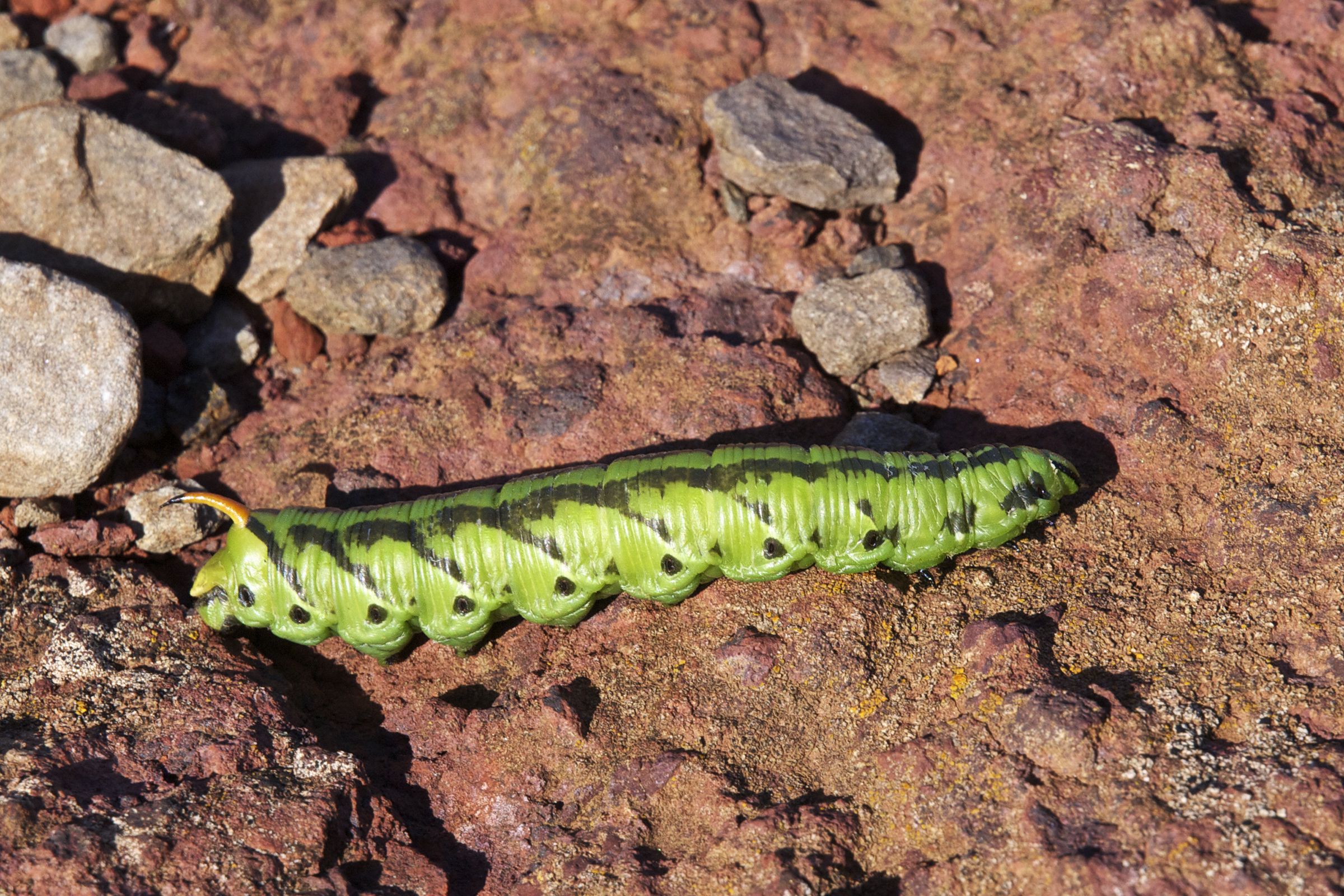
Larva of Agrius convolvuli

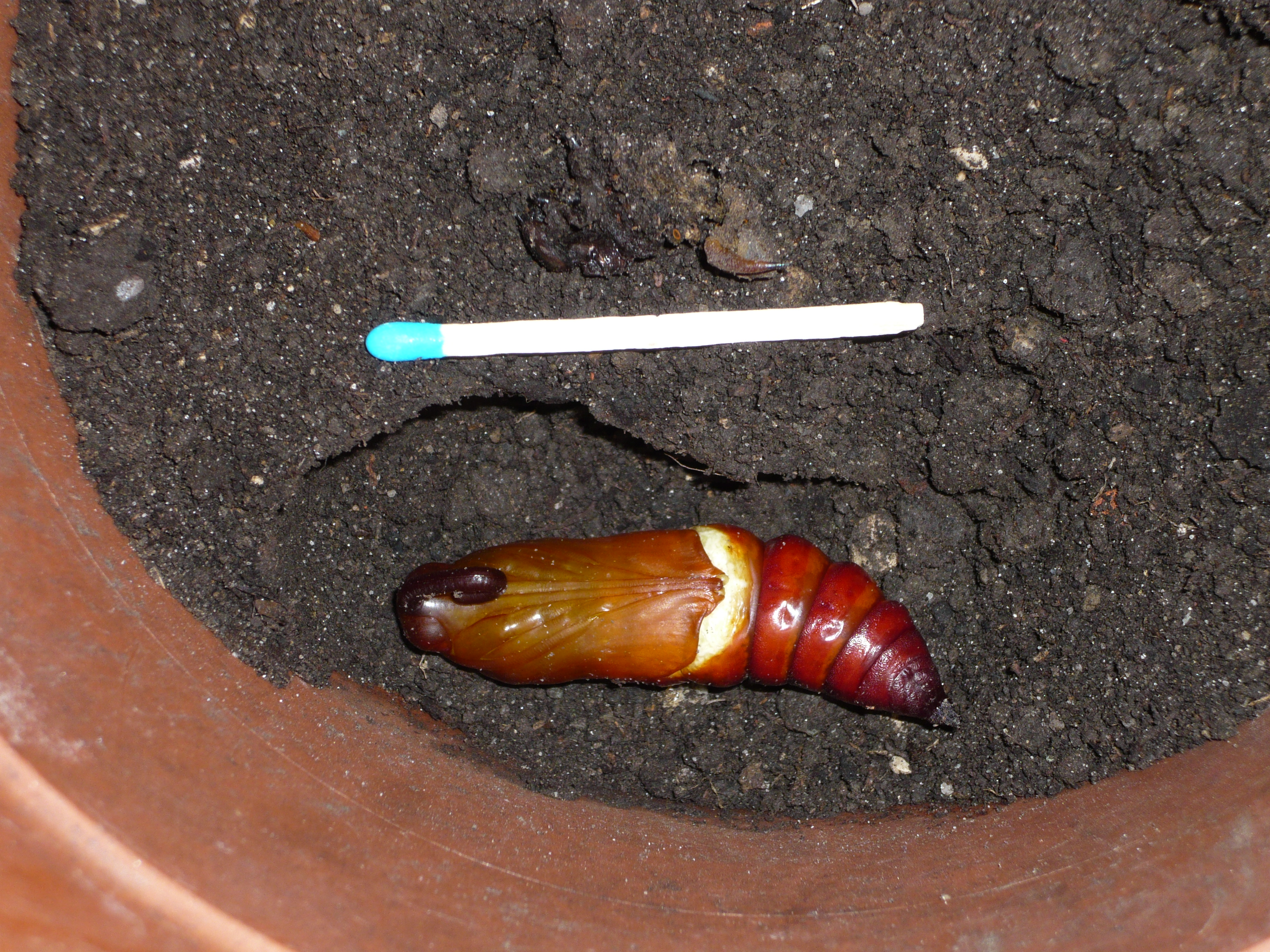
Pupa of Agrius convolvuli

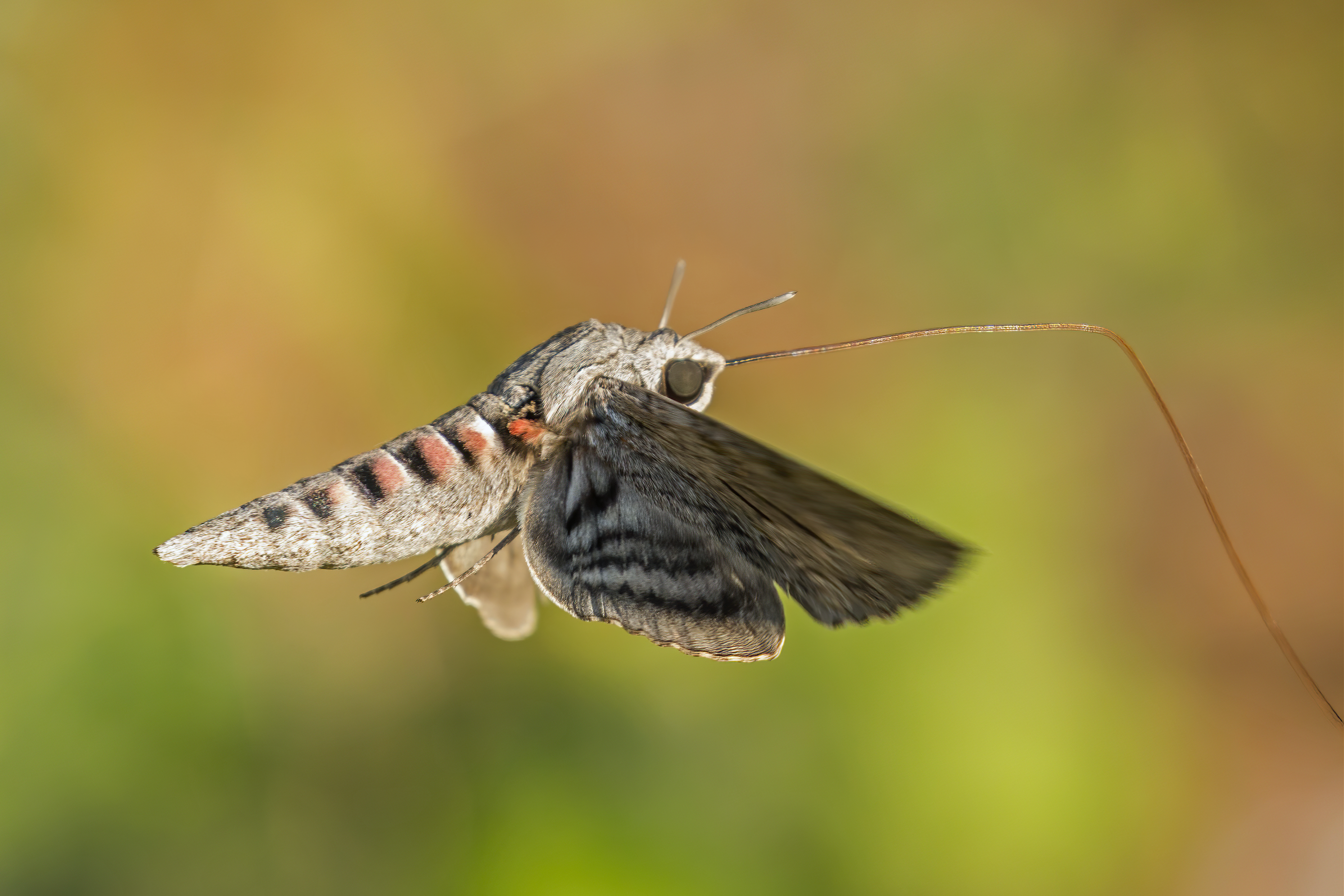
Feeding in flight

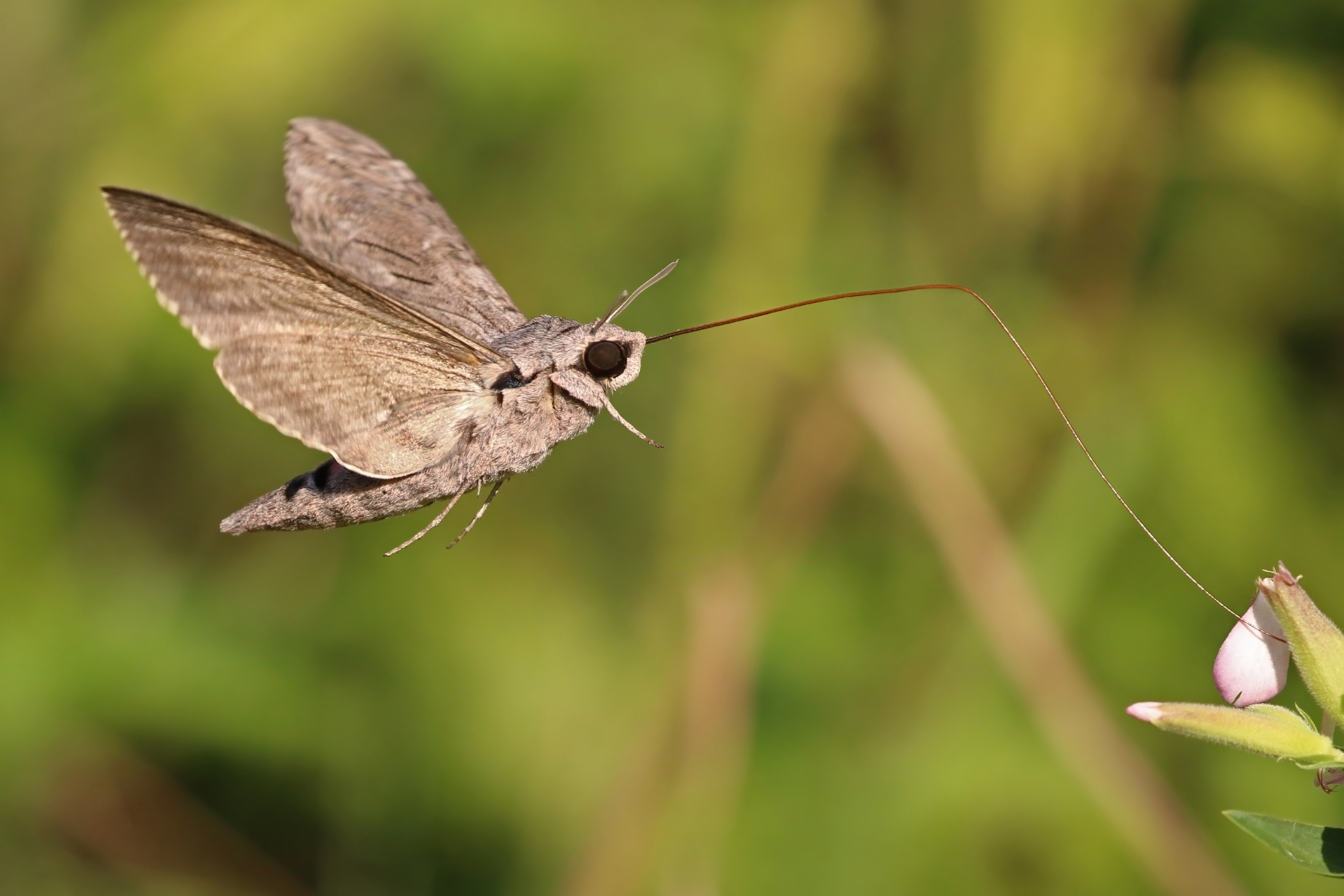
Showing length of proboscis
Both near Rila Monastery, Bulgaria

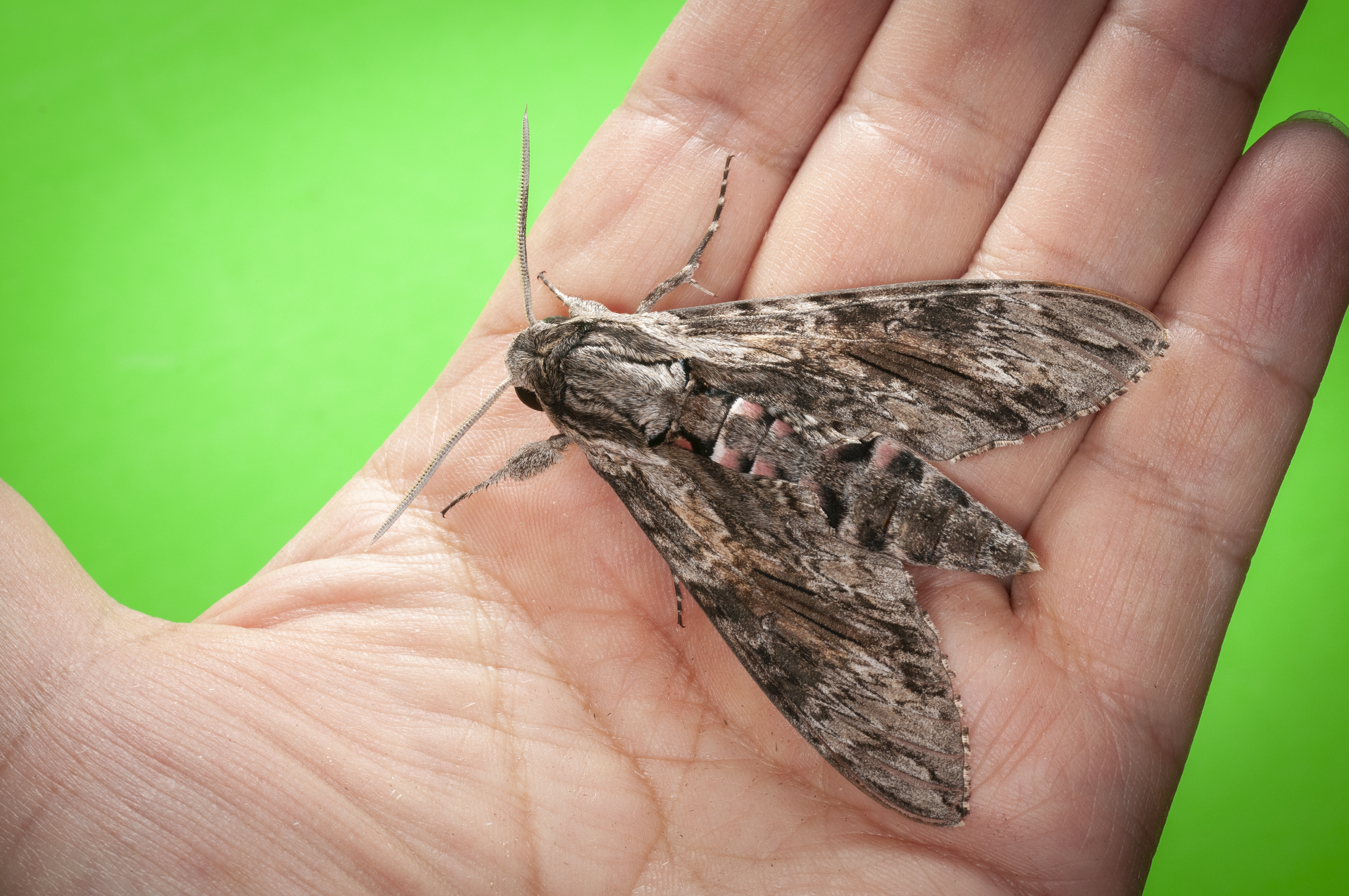
Agrius convolvuli, Adult, South Korea
