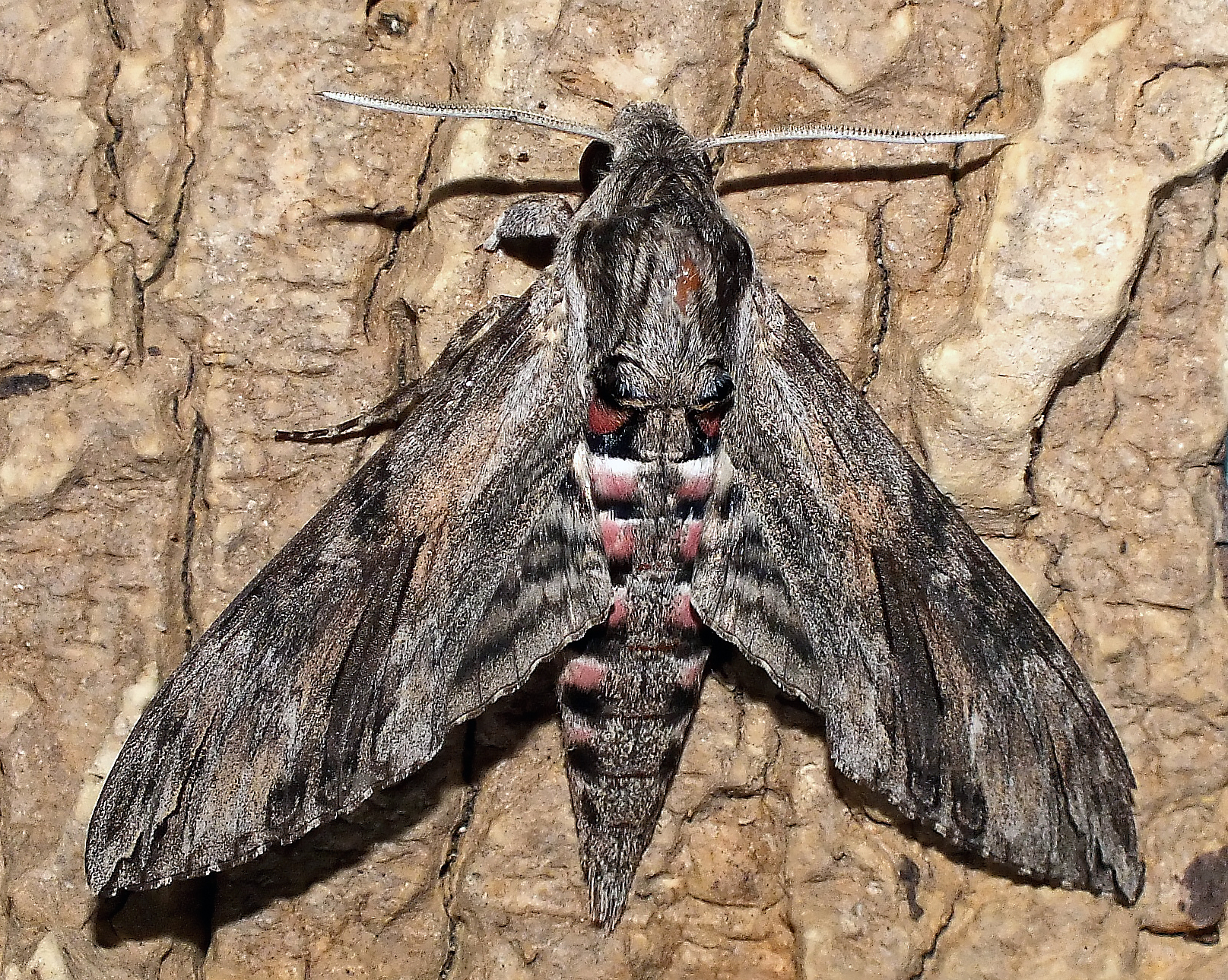
- Agrius convolvuli

Scientific classification
- Kingdom: Animalia
- Phylum: Arthropoda
- Clade: Pancrustacea
- Class: Insecta
- Order: Lepidoptera
- Family: Sphingidae
- Tribe: Acherontiini
- Genus: Agrius; Hübner, 1819

= Agrius (moth) =

Genus of moths

Agrius is a genus of moths in the family Sphingidae. The genus was erected by Jacob Hübner in 1819.

These moths are generally grey with pinkish or yellowish suffusions on the hindwings and stripes on the abdomen.

== Species ==
- Agrius cingulata (Fabricius, 1775), pink-spotted hawk moth (South, Central America), type species for the genus
- Agrius convolvuli (Linnaeus, 1758), convolvulus hawk moth (Eurasia, Africa, Australia)
- Agrius cordiae Riotte, 1984 (Marquesas Islands)
- Agrius godarti (Macleaey, 1826) (Australia)
- Agrius luctifera (Walker, 1865) (Indonesia)
- Agrius rothschildi Kitching & Cadiou, 2000
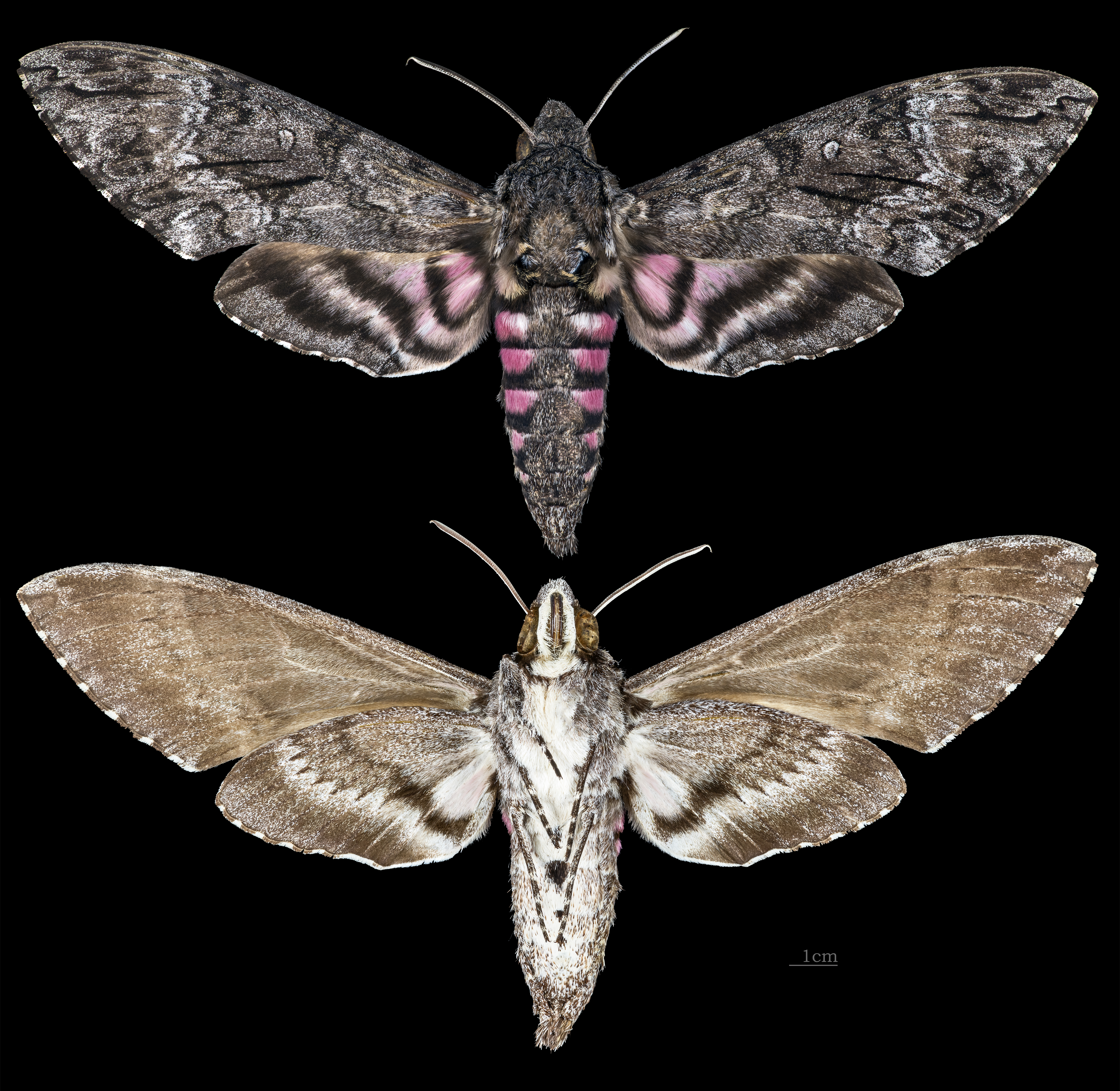
Agrius cingulata

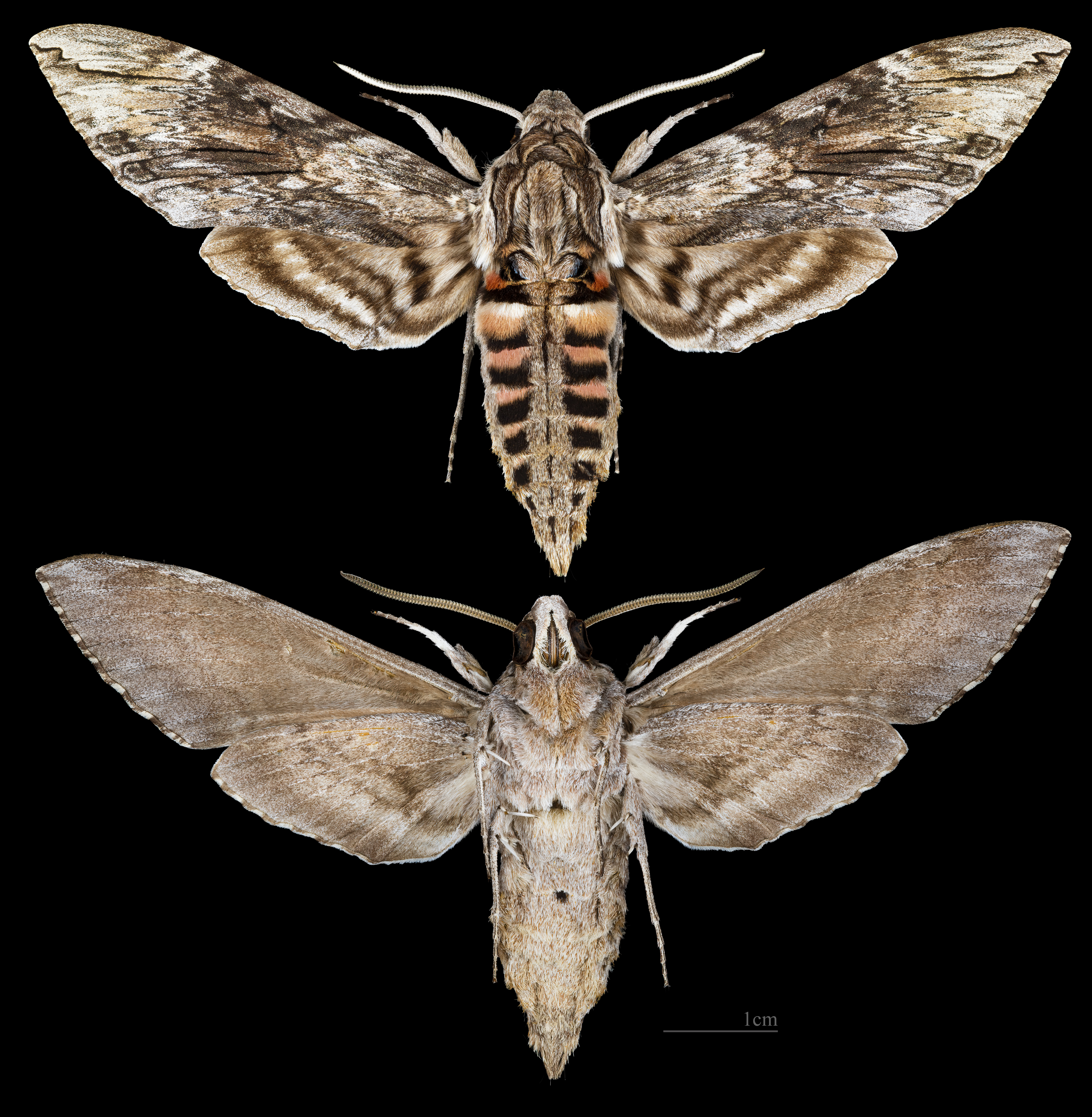
Agrius convolvuli

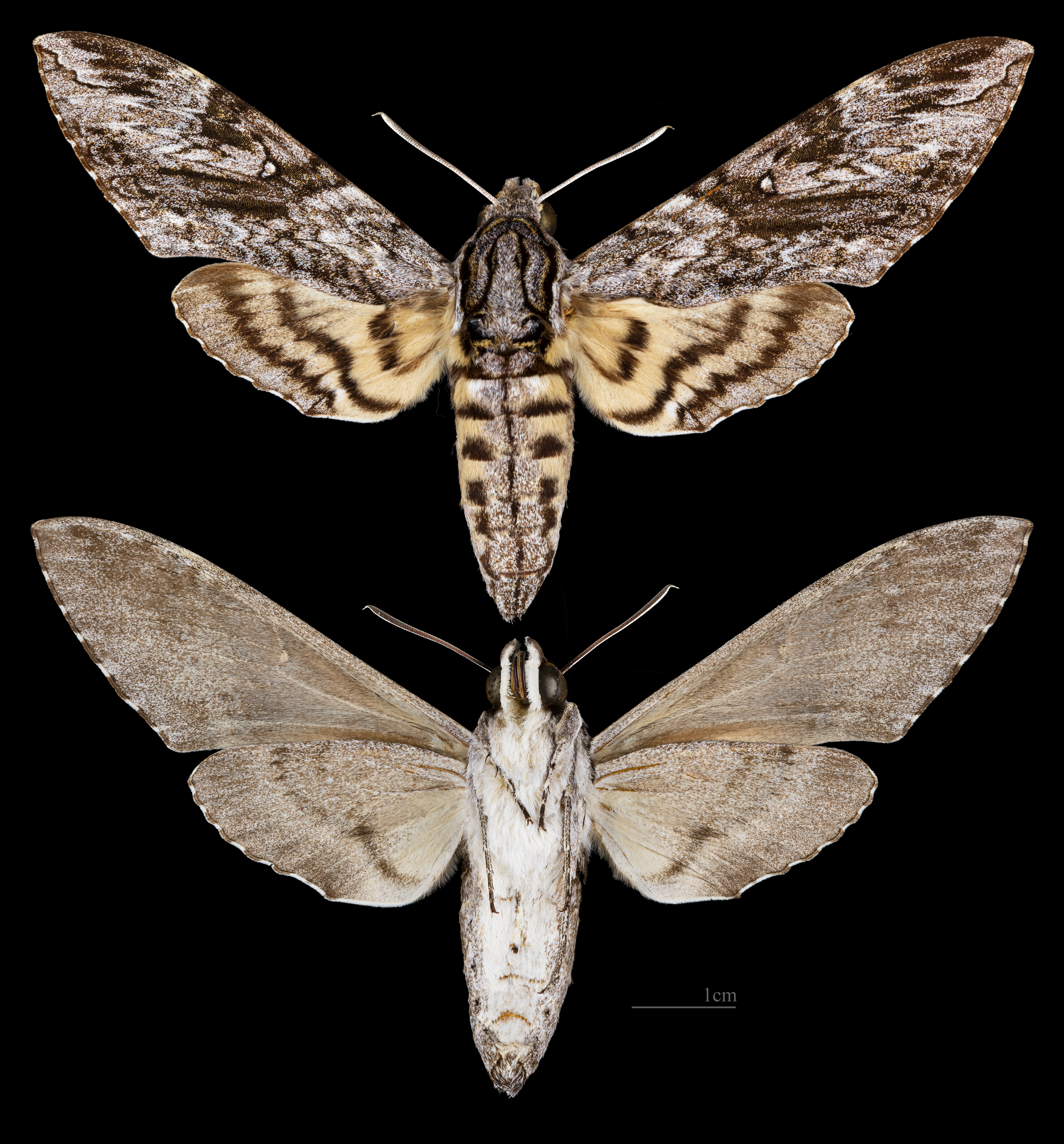
Agrius godarti
