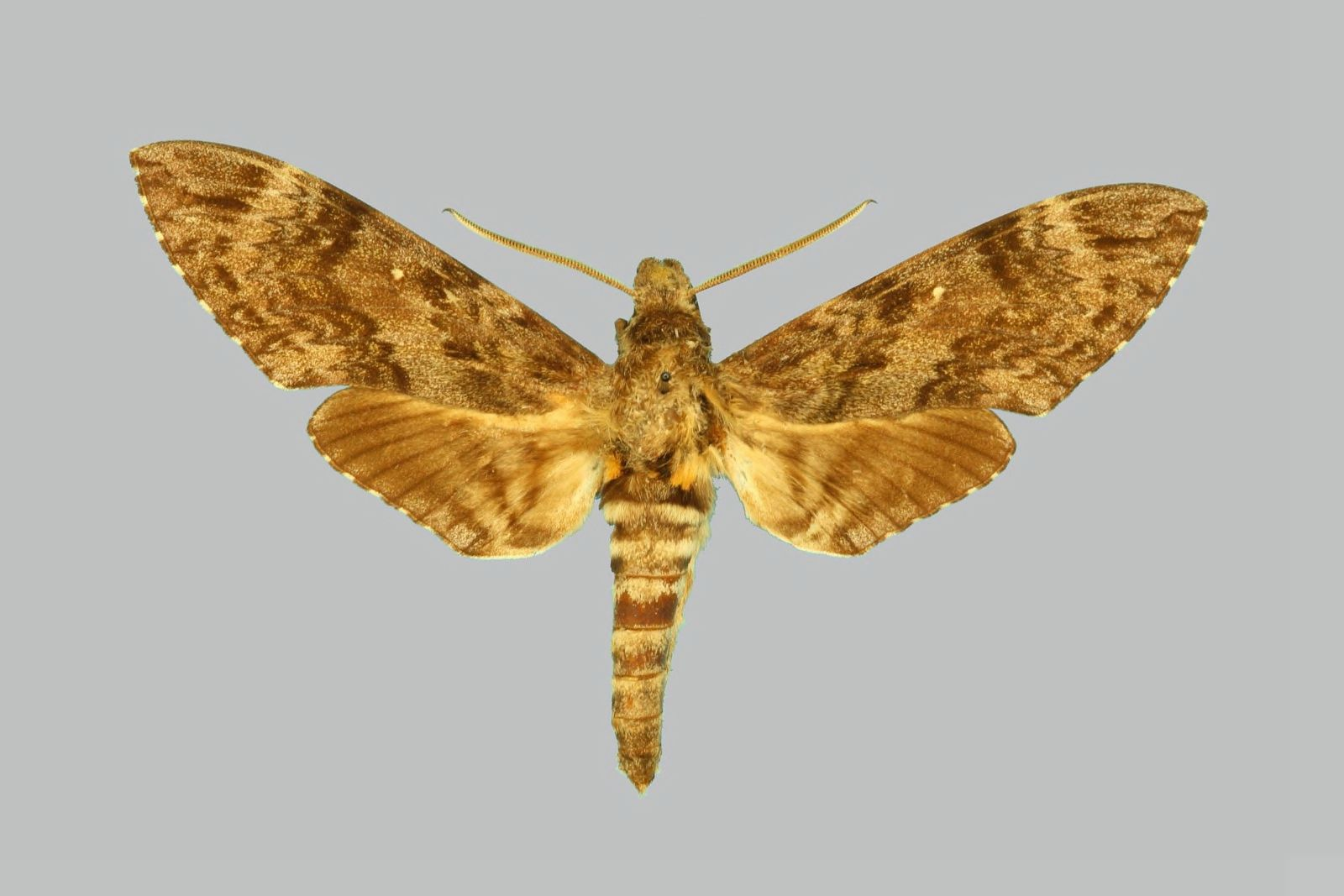

Scientific classification
- Domain: Eukaryota
- Kingdom: Animalia
- Phylum: Arthropoda
- Class: Insecta
- Order: Lepidoptera
- Family: Sphingidae
- Genus: Agrius
- Species: A. luctifera

Binomial name
- Agrius luctifera (Walker, 1865)

Synonyms
- Phlegethontius lixi Rothschild, 1894; Herse luctifera Rothschild, 1915; Agrius triangulifera (Holland, 1900); Timoria concolorata Kaye, 1919; Agrius elegans (Gehlen, 1932); Macrosila luctifera Walker, 1865; Protoparce triangulifera Holland, 1900; Protoparce schmeltzii Butler, 1882

= Agrius luctifera =

Species of moth

Agrius luctifera is a moth in the family Sphingidae. It is found in Indonesia and New Guinea.

It is similar to Lintneria maura in that the metanotum has conspicuous yellow tufts but with an additional smaller yellow spot posteriorly on either side of the mesonotum. There is slight sexual dimorphism, mainly in the forewing lines which are less distinct in females than in males. The dorsal black abdominal line is present but not strongly marked and the bases of the abdominal tergites are white laterally. The discal spot is white and conspicuous. The hindwing upperside is entirely shaded blackish-brown with indistinct black bands.
