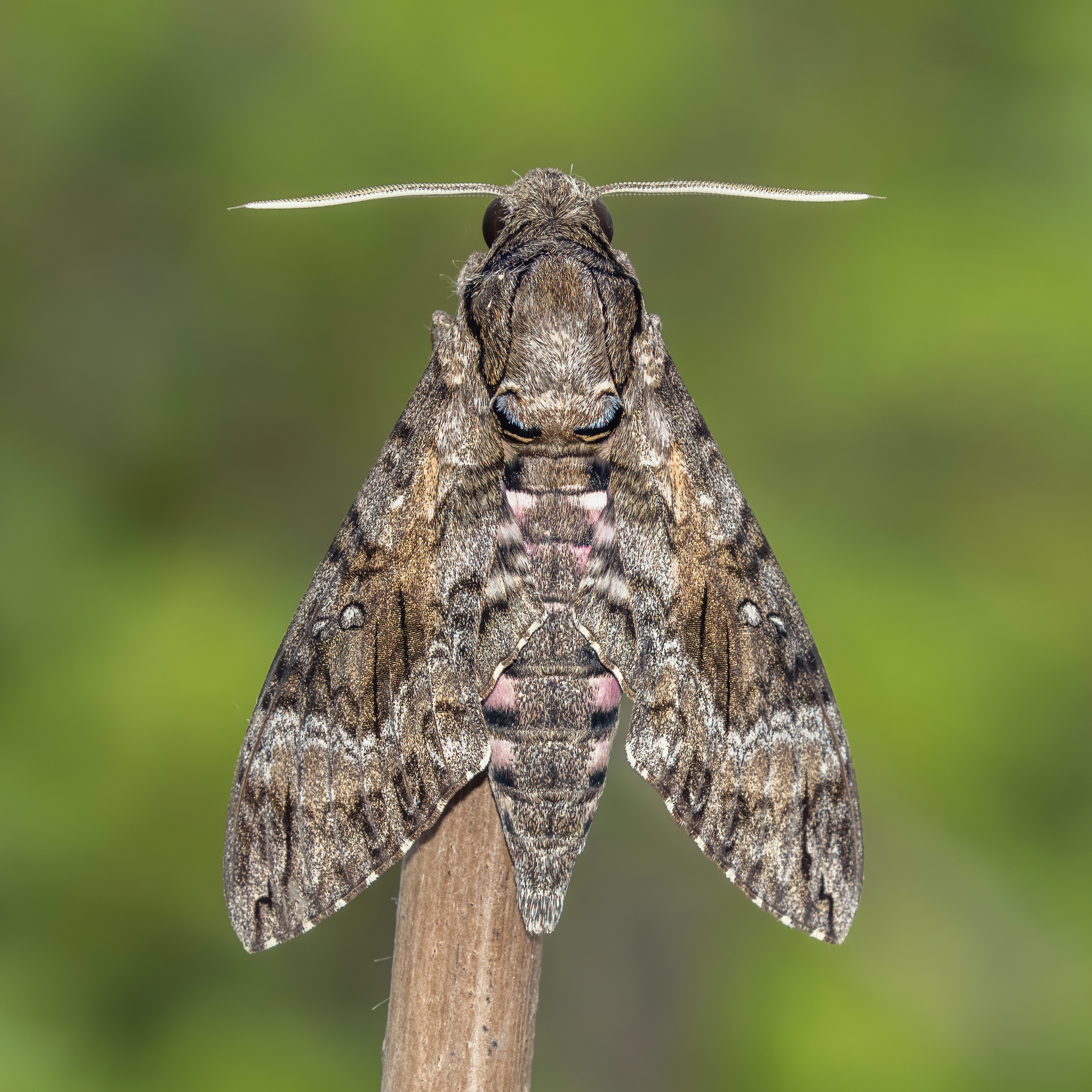
- Male, Mount Totumas cloud forest, Panama

Scientific classification
- Kingdom: Animalia
- Phylum: Arthropoda
- Clade: Pancrustacea
- Class: Insecta
- Order: Lepidoptera
- Family: Sphingidae
- Genus: Agrius
- Species: A. cingulata

Binomial name
- Agrius cingulata (Fabricius, 1775)
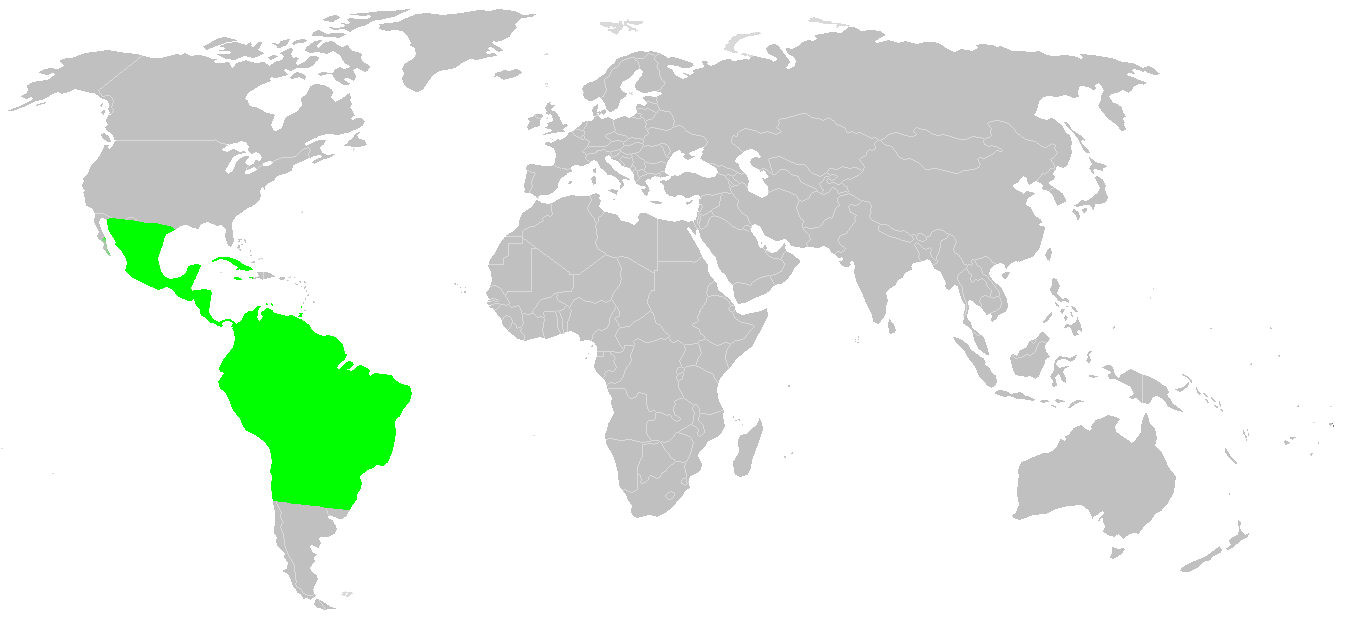
- Native range, see text for details

Synonyms
- Sphinx cingulata Fabricius, 1775; Herse cingulata; Protoparce cingulata; Phlegethontius cingulata; Sphinx affinis Goeze, 1780; Sphinx pungens Eschscholtz, 1821; Sphinx druraei Donovan, 1810; Agrius cingulatus; Agrius cingulata ypsilon-nigrum Bryk, 1953; Herse cingulata pallida Closs, 1917; Herse cingulata tukurine Lichy, 1943; Sphinx cingulata decolora Edwards, 1882

= Agrius cingulata =

Species of moth

Agrius cingulata, the pink-spotted hawkmoth or sweetpotato hornworm, is a moth in the family Sphingidae. The species was first described by Johan Christian Fabricius in 1775.

== Description ==
The imago has a wingspan of 3 3/4 to 4 3/4 inches (9.5–12 cm). Its robust body is gray brown with pink bands. The abdomen tapers to a point. The hindwings are gray with black bands and pink at the bases.

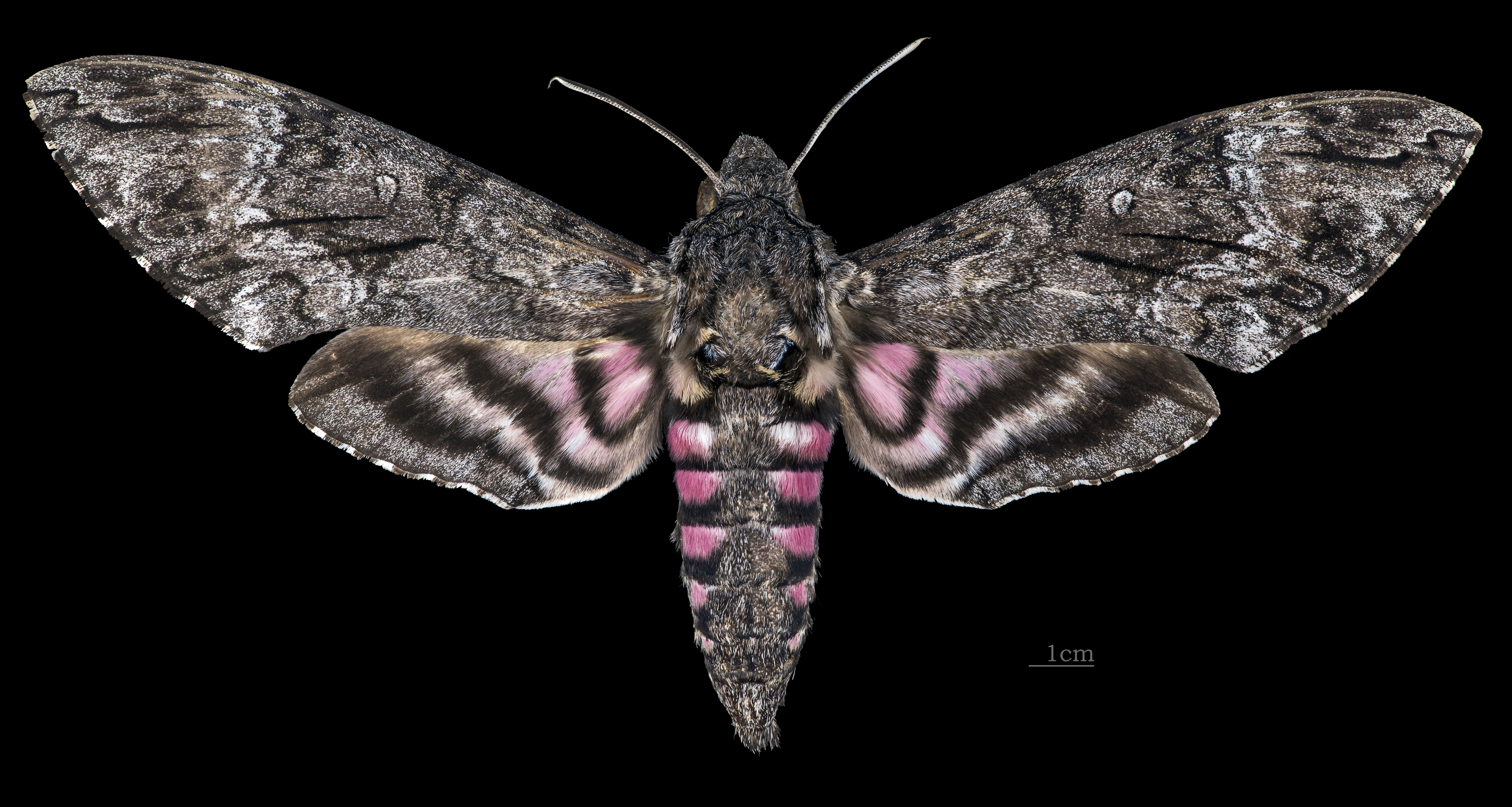
Female

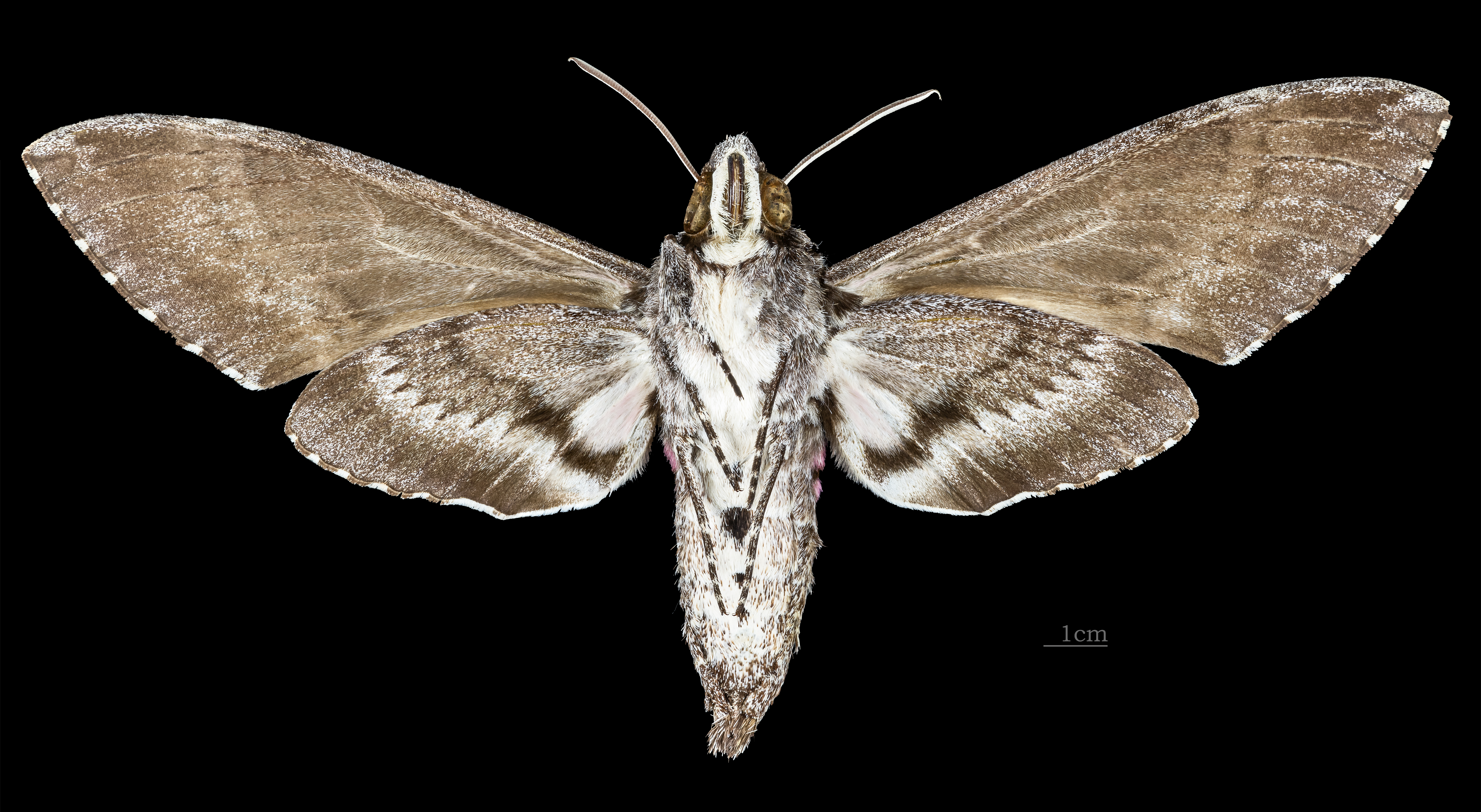
Female underside

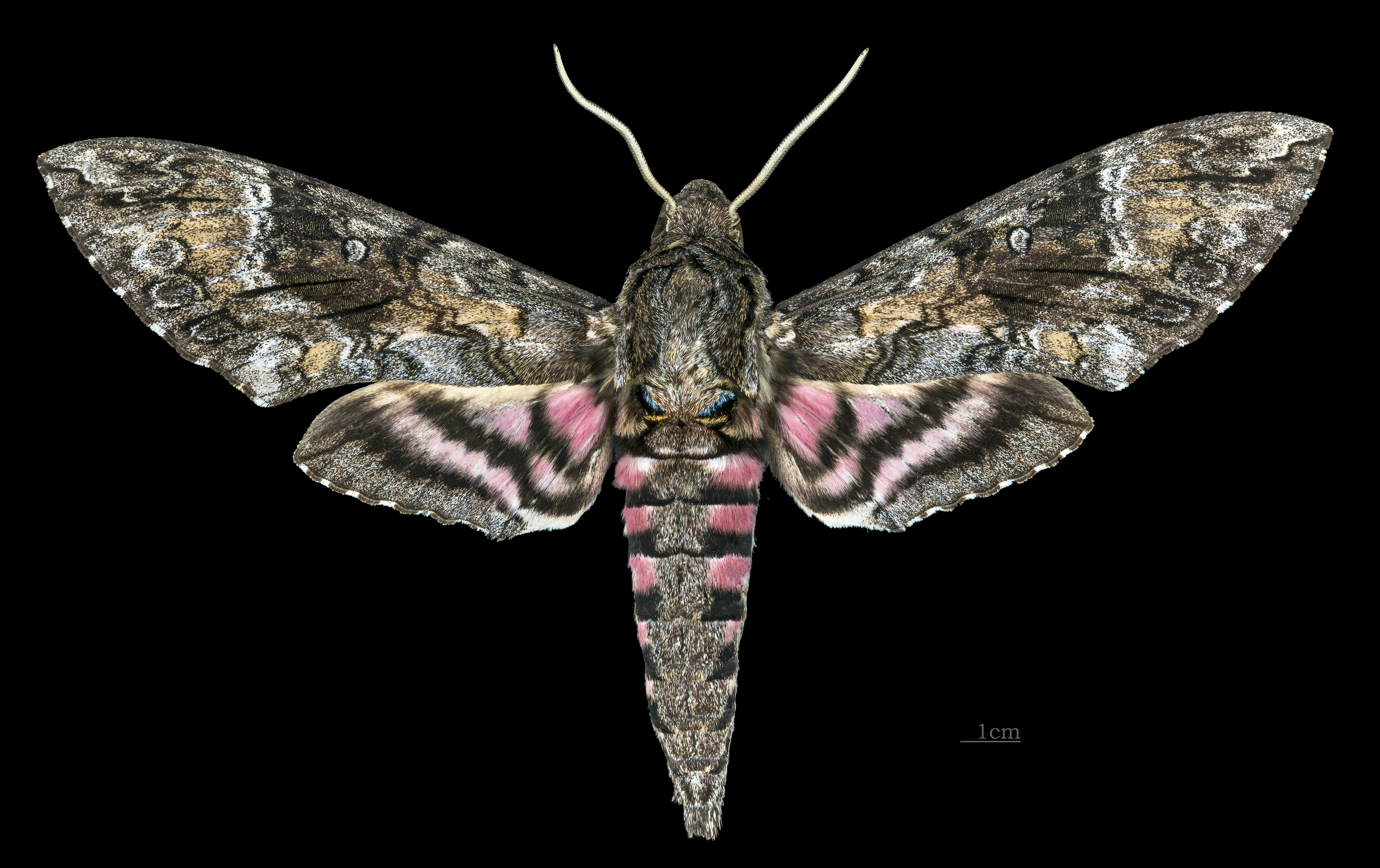
Male

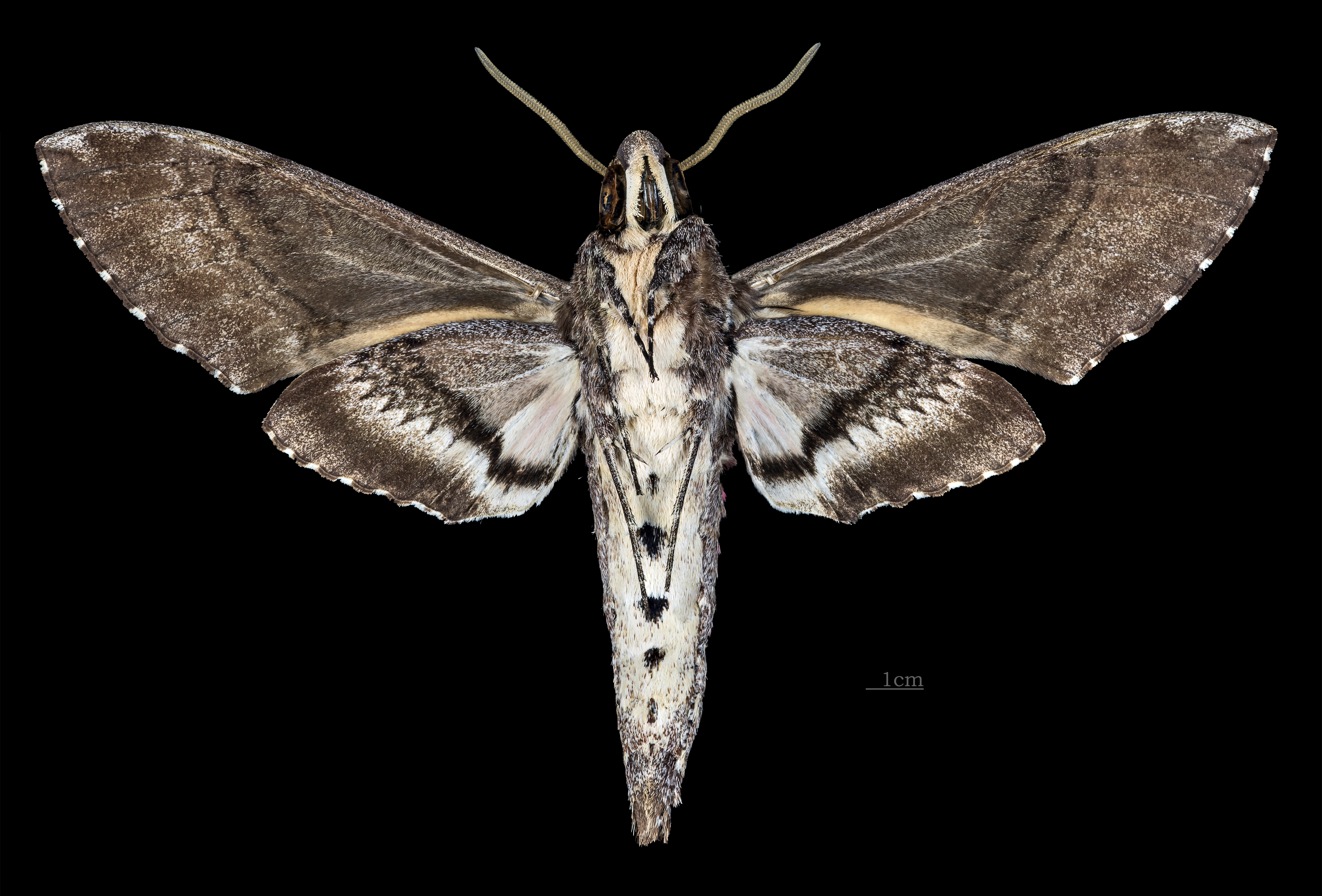
Male underside

== Biology ==
The imago is nocturnal. It feeds on the nectar from deep-throated flowers including moonflower (Calonyction aculeatum), morning glories (Convolvulus species), and petunias (Petunia species).

The larva is a large, stout caterpillar with a horn. It feeds during the day and the night on sweet potato (Ipomoea batatas), Datura species, and other plants. It is known as a pest of sweet potato.

== Distribution ==
This is mainly a neotropical species, and the adults migrate north to Canada and south to Patagonia and the Falkland Islands. It can also be found in the Galápagos Islands and Hawaii. It has been reported from western Europe, including Portugal and the United Kingdom. It has recently become established in West Africa and Cape Verde, possibly having originated in Brazil.

== Gallery ==
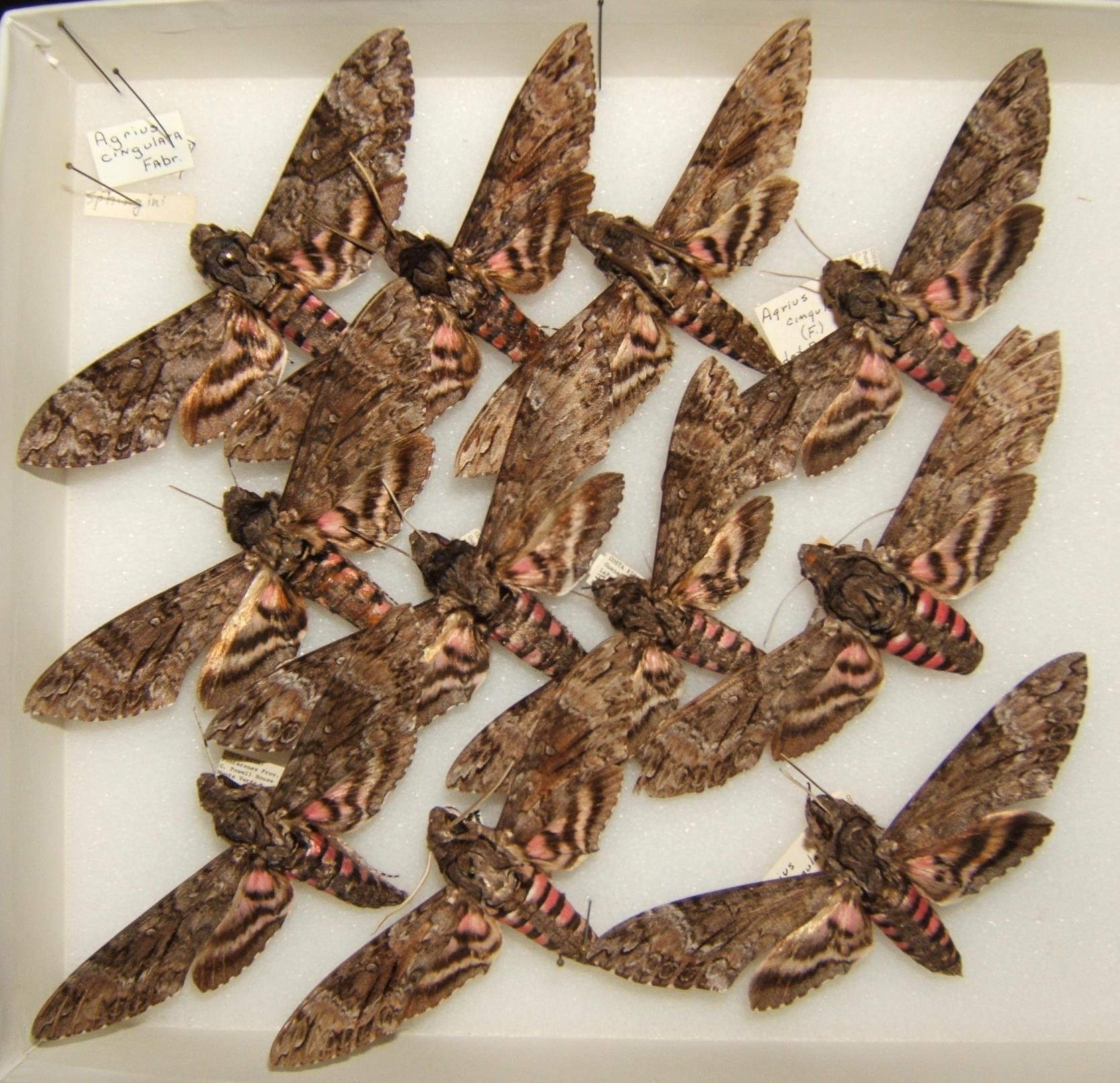
Adult variation

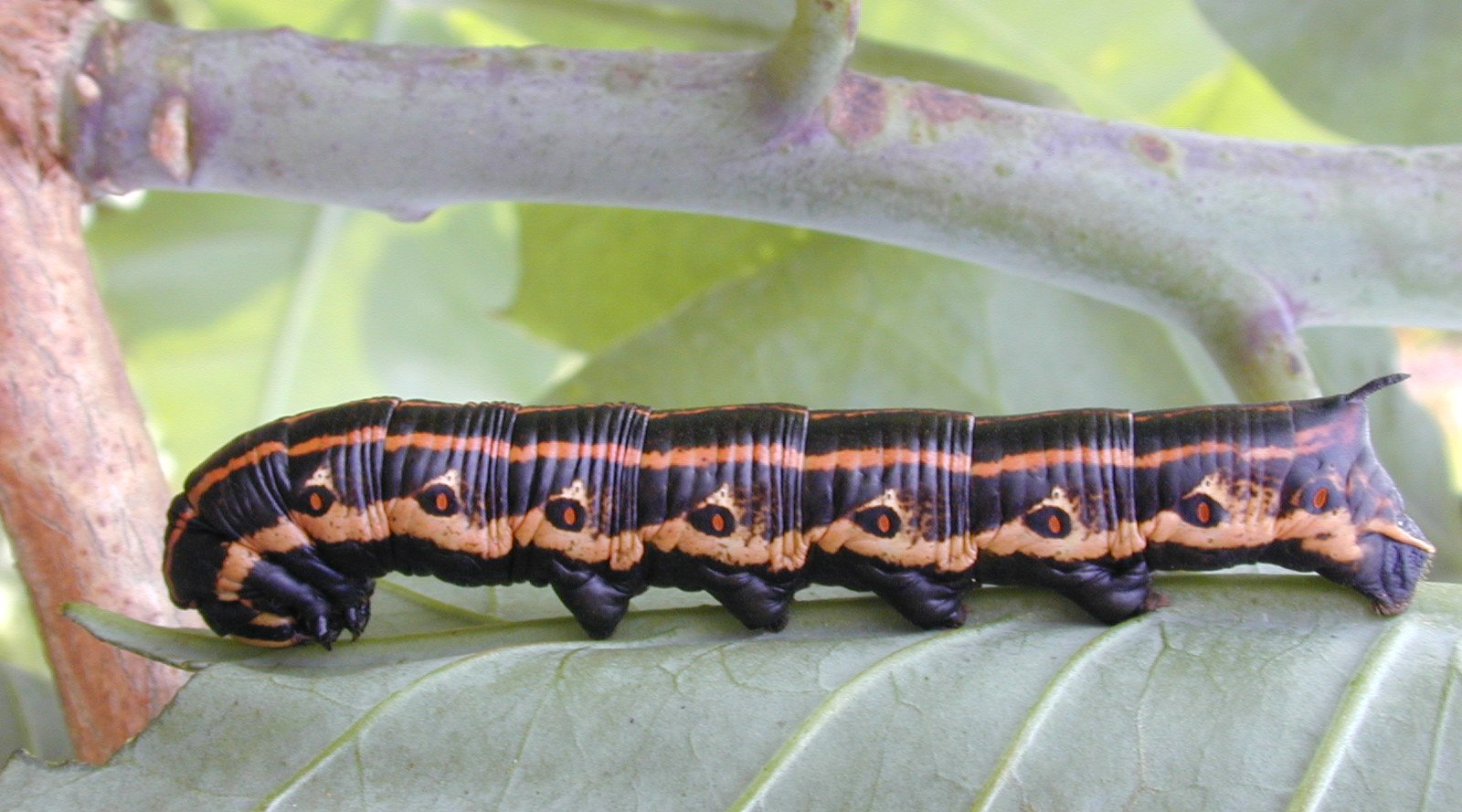
Caterpillar

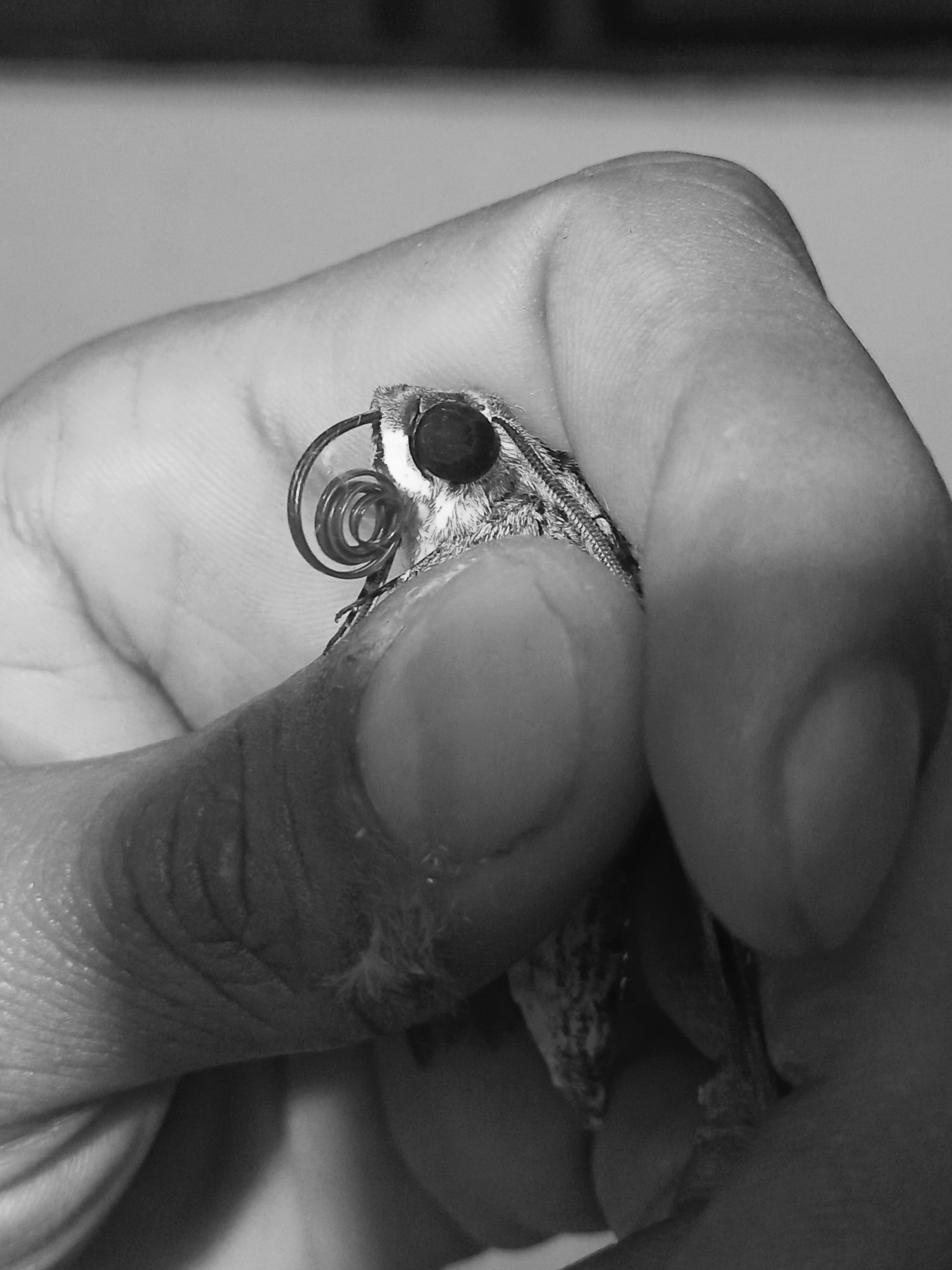
Proboscis
